= U.S. Route 165 =

Highway in the United States

U.S. Route 165
- US 165 highlighted in red

Route information
- Auxiliary route of US 65
- Length: 412 mi (663 km)
- Existed: 1926–present

Major junctions
- South end: US 90 in Iowa, LA
- I-10 in Iowa, LA; US 190 in Kinder, LA; I-49 in Alexandria, LA; US 84 in Tullos, LA; I-20 in Monroe, LA; US 80 in Monroe, LA; US 65 / US 278 in Dermott, AR; US 82 in Montrose, AR; US 65 in Dumas, AR; US 79 in Stuttgart, AR
- North end: US 70 in North Little Rock, AR

Location
- Country: United States
- States: Louisiana, Arkansas

Highway system
- United States Numbered Highway System; List; Special; Divided

U.S. Route 165 is a north–south United States highway spur of U.S. Highway 65. It currently runs for 412 miles (663 km) from U.S. Route 90 in Iowa, Louisiana north to U.S. Highway 70 in North Little Rock, Arkansas. The route passes through the states of Arkansas and Louisiana. It passes through the cities of Monroe and Alexandria in Louisiana. A segment of US 165 serves as a routing of the Great River Road within Arkansas.

== Route description ==
Lengths
	mi	km
LA	229	369
AR	183	295
Total	412	663

=== Louisiana ===
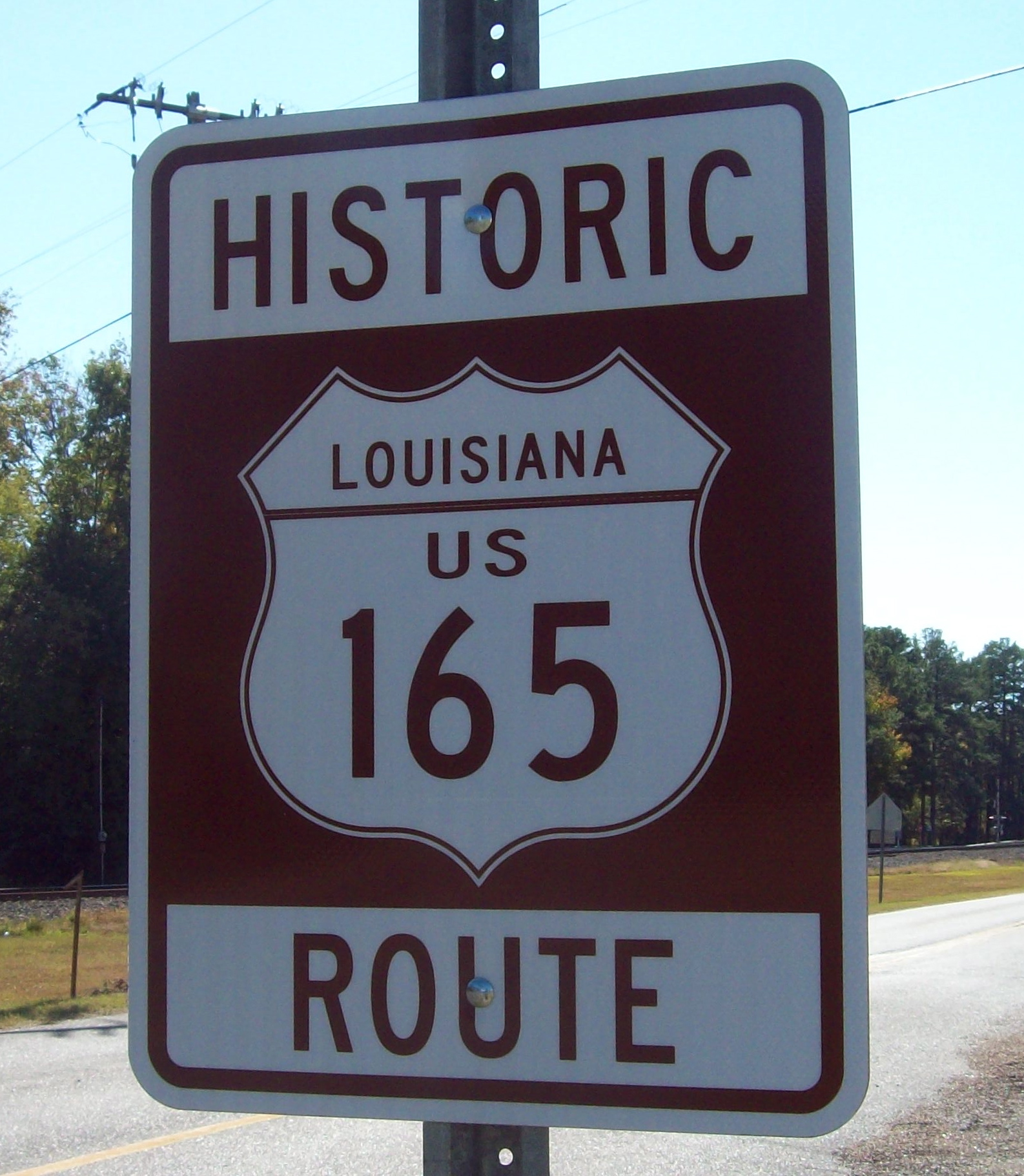
The former route of U.S. 165, designated as a Historic Route

From its southern terminus in Iowa at US 90 (near Lake Charles), US 165 follows a diagonal north south route, passing through the casino town of Kinder, where it intersects US 190. Just south of Alexandria it merges with US 71 and they join through the west side of the city, across the Red River and into Pineville. A new four-lane (two lanes in each direction) bridge was built beside the aging OK Allen Bridge (named the Curtis-Coleman Bridge) and was opened in 2016. At that time, the OK Allen bridge was demolished. Past the bridge, the two highways meet US 167 and 71 parts with 165. Going on through the Kisatchie National Forest the rest of the highway to Monroe is forest land, farmland, and small towns. Crossing I-20 in Monroe, the highway's largest city, it proceeds to Bastrop and crosses the Arkansas line a few miles north of the town. Due to the Louisiana DOT TIMED Project, US 165 is now a four lane divided highway from Iowa to Bastrop. US 165 passes near three federal prisons: USP Oakdale and two near Pollock. Also, near Oakdale is the ruins of Camp Claiborne, an abandoned WWII military post.

=== Arkansas ===
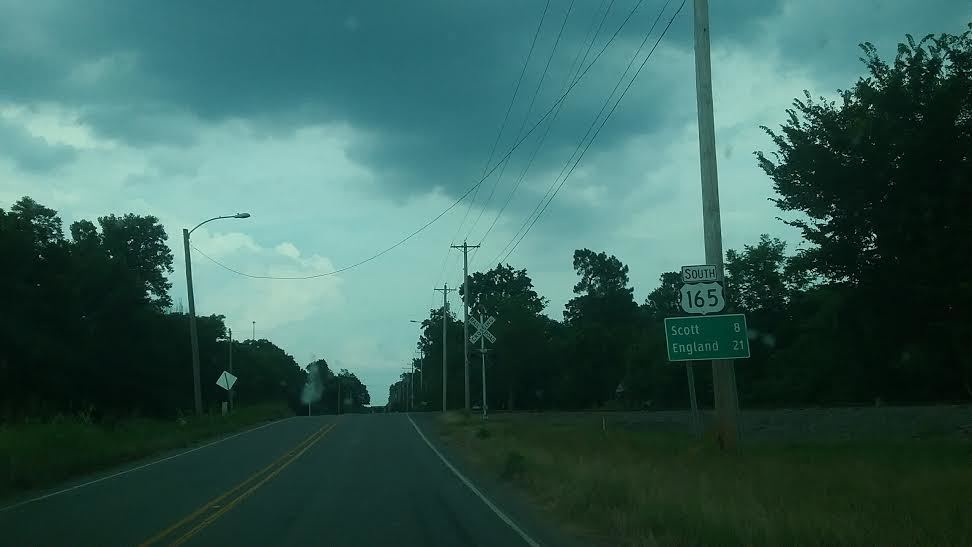
U.S. Route 165 at its northern terminus in North Little Rock, Ark.

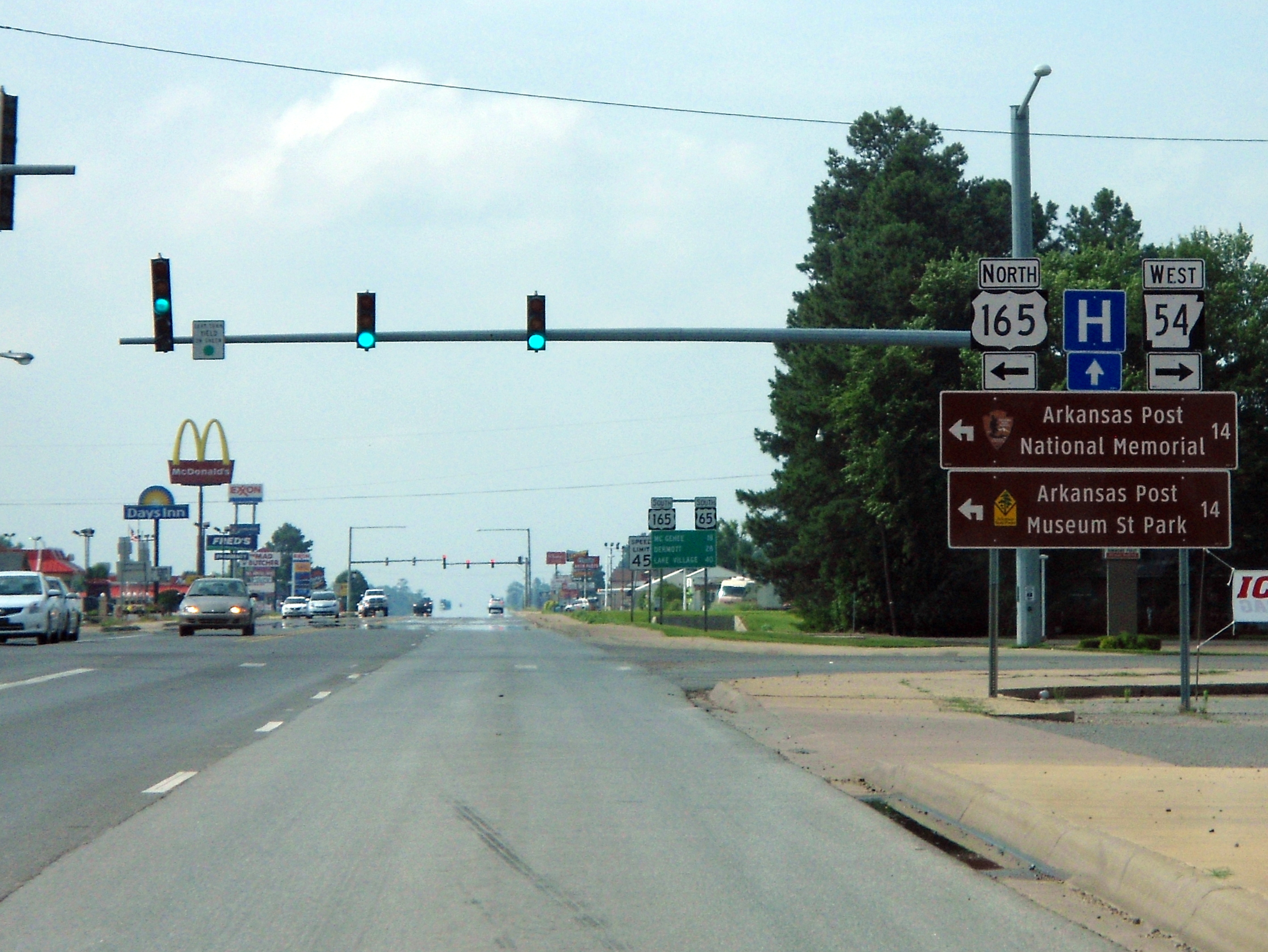
US 165 begins a southbound concurrency with US 65 in Dumas, Arkansas

The route enters Arkansas south of Wilmot in Ashley County. US 165 passes through bayous and marshlands before it intersects Highway 52 and Highway 173 in the town. Further north, in Parkdale, the route intersects Highway 8 and Highway 209. In Portland, US 165 intersects Highway 160 before entering Montrose. In the southern part of Montrose US 165 passes under U.S. Route 82, intersecting US 82 Business (US 82B) downtown. US 165 continues north near Cut-off Creek Wildlife Management Area to enter Drew County. Only serving the extreme southeastern corner of the county, US 165 runs through Jerome near the Jerome Elementary School No. 22. The highway enters Chicot County near Dermott where it intersects Highway 208 and Highway 35. Northeast of town, the route intersects its parent route (US 65), which form a concurrency to Dumas.

The route breaks from US 65 at Pickens Street, with Highway 277 shooting from the route east of Cypress Creek. The route forms a concurrency north with Highway 1 for 24.99 miles (40.22 km) beginning at Back Gate. US 165/AR 1 intersect Highway 212 before crossing the Arkansas River on the Pendleton Bridge.

Upon entering Arkansas County, the route passes the A.M. Bohnert Rice Plantation Pump#2 Engine and through sectioned farmland before meeting US 165B in Gillett. US 165/AR 1 continue north to De Witt, with AR 1 breaking east and US 165 turning due west. The route has a junction with Highway 11 at Eldridge Corner after which US 165 turns due north. This segment of US 165 was formerly AR 11 and is preserved in part by the National Register of Historic Places as Old AR 11 – Kauffman Road. The route enters Stuttgart after an intersection with 22nd Street. US 165 skirts the eastern edge of the city as Park Avenue before it turns west to intersect US 63 and enter Prairie County. The route only has one junction in its 2.9 miles (4.7 km) within the county, Highway 343.

The route next enters Lonoke County. Now within the Little Rock metro area, the route serves the southern part of the county with many rural junctions. Along its path, the route runs west through Humnoke, Allport, Coy (all with populations under 300 as of 2010) while intersecting Highway 13 and Highway 31 prior to England. US 165 turns northeast in England after a junction with Highway 256. US 165 passes through the Keo Commercial Historic District in Keo and later the Toltec Mounds Archeological State Park before entering Pulaski County.

Entering North Little Rock, the route has a junction with I-440 before terminating at Broadway Street (US 70).

==== Great River Road ====

The Great River Road is designated as a National Scenic Byway in the state of Arkansas. Established in 1938, the route is actually a series of roads which connect Canada and the Gulf of Mexico along the Mississippi River. The portion of US 165 from the beginning of its concurrency with US 65 near Dermott north to De Witt is part of the Great River Road in Arkansas. The designation follows AR 1 north from De Witt and US 65 south of Dermott.

== History ==
US 165 was established in 1926 on a route extending from Iowa, Louisiana to McGehee, Arkansas. A proposed extension north to Corning, Arkansas in 1946 was deferred. The route was extended to its current North Little Rock terminus in 1982.

The Louisiana portion was generally aligned with the existing State Route 24 south of Alexandria and State Route 14 north of Alexandria. Both had been designated in 1921 and remained co-signed with US 165 until the 1955 Louisiana Highway renumbering.

US 165 replaced Arkansas Highway 11 in much of Arkansas County, Arkansas. Highway 11 was the main route through the area since its designation in the original 1926 state highway system. Some of this original pavement has been preserved by the National Register of Historic Places as Old AR 11 – Kauffman Road.

== Major intersections ==
State	County/Parish	Location	mi	km	Destinations	Notes
Louisiana	Calcasieu	Iowa			US 90	Southern terminus
Louisiana	Jefferson Davis				LA 3258 (Frontage Road)	
Louisiana	Jefferson Davis				I-10 – Lake Charles, Lafayette	Exit 44 on I-10
Louisiana	Jefferson Davis	Woodlawn			LA 101	
Louisiana	Jefferson Davis	Fenton			LA 102 east	
Louisiana	Allen	Kinder			LA 383 – Indian Village	
Louisiana	Allen	Kinder			US 190 – Ragley, Elton	
Louisiana	Allen	Kinder			Ragley	Access via LA 1150
Louisiana	Allen	Oberlin			LA 26	
Louisiana	Allen				LA 1152 north	
Louisiana	Allen	Oakdale			LA 1152 south	
Louisiana	Allen	Oakdale			LA 10 – Elizabeth, Leesville, Ville Platte	
Louisiana	Allen	Oakdale			LA 1153 north	
Louisiana	Allen	Pawnee			LA 1153 south	
Louisiana	Rapides	Glenmora			LA 113 south / LA 497 north – Pitkin	
Louisiana	Rapides	Forest Hill			LA 112 east / LA 497 south to I-49	Southern end of LA 112/LA 497 concurrency
Louisiana	Rapides	Forest Hill			LA 497 north	Northern end of LA 497 concurrency
Louisiana	Rapides	Bringhurst			LA 112 west – Hineston, Leesville	Northern end of LA 112 concurrency
Louisiana	Rapides	Woodworth			LA 3265 east to I-49 – Indian Creek Recreational Area	
Louisiana	Rapides	Alexandria			US 71 south to US 167 / I-49 south / Masonic Drive (LA 1208-5) – Opelousas	Roundabout; southern end of US 71 concurrency
Louisiana	Rapides	Alexandria			LA 1208-3 (Jackson Street)	Interchange
Louisiana	Rapides	Alexandria			LA 28 west / LA 28 Bus. east (Monroe Street) – Fort Johnson, Leesville, Alexandria International Airport, England Air Park, Rapides Coliseum	Southern end of LA 28 concurrency
Louisiana	Rapides	Alexandria			LA 496 – Kent House Plantation	
Louisiana	Rapides	Alexandria			LA 498 / Frontage Road	
Louisiana	Rapides	Alexandria			US 165 Bus. north / LA 1 – Boyce, Marksville	Exit 70 on US 71
Louisiana	Rapides	Alexandria			I-49 / LA 28 east – Shreveport, Opelousas	Northern end of LA 28 concurrency; exit 71 on US 71; exit 86 on I-49
Louisiana	Rapides	Pineville			US 71 north	Interchange; northern end of US 71 concurrency
Louisiana	Rapides	Pineville			US 167 – Ruston, Winnfield, Alexandria	Interchange
Louisiana	Rapides	Pineville			US 165 Bus. south / LA 1254	
Louisiana	Rapides	Pineville			LA 116 – Louisiana National Guard Training Center Pineville, Esler Airfield	
Louisiana	Rapides	Paradise			LA 623 – Tioga Heritage Park and Museum	
Louisiana	Rapides	Ball			LA 1204	Southern end of LA 1204 concurrency
Louisiana	Rapides	Ball			LA 1204 (Camp Livingston Road)	Northern end of LA 1204 concurrency
Louisiana	Grant				LA 3130	
Louisiana	Grant				LA 8 east – Camp Grant Walker	Southern end of LA 8 concurrency
Louisiana	Grant	Pollock			LA 8 west (Thornberg Street)	Northern end of LA 8 concurrency
Louisiana	Grant	Pollock			LA 366 east (Patterson Street)	
Louisiana	Grant				LA 524 east	
Louisiana	Grant				LA 524 east – Camp Hardtner	Southern end of LA 524 concurrency
Louisiana	Grant				LA 524 west	Northern end of LA 524 concurrency
Louisiana	Grant				LA 123 west – Dry Prong, Colfax	
Louisiana	Grant				LA 502	
Louisiana	Grant	Georgetown			LA 500	
Louisiana	Grant	Georgetown			LA 3098	Southbound exit and entrance
Louisiana	Grant	Georgetown			LA 500	
Louisiana	La Salle	Tullos			LA 125 / Historic US 165 north	
Louisiana	La Salle	Tullos			US 84 – Winnfield, Jena	
Louisiana	La Salle				LA 125 Spur	
Louisiana	La Salle	Urania			LA 3259 (East Hardtner Street) – Urania	
Louisiana	La Salle	Olla			LA 127 – Jena, Downtown Olla, Historical District	
Louisiana	La Salle	Olla			LA 124 – Downtown Olla, Historical District, Olla North La Salle Regional Airport	
Louisiana	Caldwell				LA 125 / Historic US 165 south	
Louisiana	Caldwell				LA 843	
Louisiana	Caldwell				LA 506 – Kelly	
Louisiana	Caldwell				LA 844 – Clarks	
Louisiana	Caldwell				LA 844 – Clarks	
Louisiana	Caldwell	Grayson			LA 850	
Louisiana	Caldwell	Grayson			LA 126 – Sikes, Holum, Rosefield	
Louisiana	Caldwell	Banks Springs			LA 4 west	Southern end of LA 4 concurrency
Louisiana	Caldwell				LA 849 – Copenhagen	
Louisiana	Caldwell				LA 4 east – Winnsboro	Northern end of LA 4 concurrency
Louisiana	Caldwell				LA 847	
Louisiana	Ouachita	Fondale			LA 841	
Louisiana	Ouachita	Richwood			US 165 Bus. north – Downtown Monroe	interchange
Louisiana	Ouachita	Monroe			LA 15 (Winnsboro Road) – Winnsboro	
Louisiana	Ouachita	Monroe			I-20 – Shreveport, Vicksburg, Monroe Airport	Exit 118 on I-20
Louisiana	Ouachita	Monroe			US 80 / US 165 Bus. south (Desiard Street)	Interchange
Louisiana	Ouachita	Monroe			Breard Street (LA 3275)	
Louisiana	Ouachita	Monroe			LA 840-6 (Forsythe Extension)	
Louisiana	Ouachita	Monroe			LA 553 (Horseshoe Lake Road) – Horseshoe Lake	
Louisiana	Ouachita				LA 134 east – Fairbanks	
Louisiana	Ouachita				LA 2 west – Sterlington, Farmerville	Southern end of LA 2 concurrency
Louisiana	Ouachita				LA 136	
Louisiana	Ouachita				LA 554	
Louisiana	Morehouse	Point Pleasant			LA 592	
Louisiana	Morehouse	Bastrop			LA 139 south / LA 593 south (South Washington Street)	
Louisiana	Morehouse	Bastrop			US 425 north / LA 593 north (North Franklin Street) – Chemin A Haut State Park	Southern end of US 425 concurrency
Louisiana	Morehouse	Bastrop			LA 830-5 (Elm Street)	
Louisiana	Morehouse	Bastrop			LA 830-6 (McCreight Street)	
Louisiana	Morehouse	Bastrop			LA 830-4 (Cooperlake Road)	
Louisiana	Morehouse	Bastrop			LA 3051	
Louisiana	Morehouse	Bastrop			LA 830-3 (Peach Orchard Road)	
Louisiana	Morehouse	Mer Rouge			US 425 south / LA 2 east / LA 138 – Oak Grove, Collinston	Northern end of US 425/LA 2 concurrency
Louisiana	Morehouse	Galion			LA 599	Southern end of LA 599 concurrency
Louisiana	Morehouse	Galion			LA 599	Northern end of LA 599 concurrency
Louisiana	Morehouse	Bonita			LA 140 (Old Bonita Road) / LA 599 (Rosenwald Road)	
Louisiana	Morehouse	Jones			LA 833	
Louisiana	Morehouse				LA 834 / LA 835 – Kilbourne	
Arkansas	Ashley	Wilmot			AR 52 east – Miller Chapel	
Arkansas	Ashley				AR 173 south – Overflow NWR GTR Access	
Arkansas	Ashley	Parkdale			AR 8 – Parkdale Business District, Hamburg, Eudora, Overflow NWR Headquarters	
Arkansas	Ashley	Parkdale			AR 209 south	
Arkansas	Ashley	Portland			AR 160 – Chicot Junction	
Arkansas	Ashley				US 82 – Hamburg, Lake Village	Interchange
Arkansas	Ashley	Montrose			US 82B	
Arkansas	Ashley–Drew county line				AR 144 east to US 65 – McMillan Corner, Lake Village	
Arkansas	Chicot	Hudspeth			AR 722-1A – Cut-Off Creek WMA, Lake Wallace	
Arkansas	Chicot				AR 980 – Airport	
Arkansas	Chicot				AR 208	
Arkansas	Chicot				AR 208 west – Dermott, Delta Regional Unit	
Arkansas	Chicot	Dermott			AR 35 – Dermott, Halley	
Arkansas	Chicot	Dermott			US 65 south / US 278 east – Lake Village, Greenville, MS	Southern end of US 65/US 278 concurrency
Arkansas	Desha				AR 159 north – Masonville	
Arkansas	Desha	McGehee			US 278 west / AR 4 east – Monticello, Arkansas City, Business District, WWII Japanese American Internment Museum	Northern end of US 278 concurrency
Arkansas	Desha	McGehee			AR 169 south – Arkansas City	
Arkansas	Desha	McGehee			AR 1 – Watson, U of A at Monticello College of Technology-McGehee, McGehee Business District	Interchange
Arkansas	Desha	McGehee			AR 159 south	
Arkansas	Desha	Tillar			AR 277 south – Tillar	
Arkansas	Drew				AR 138 – Winchester, Kelso	
Arkansas	Desha	Omega			AR 159 south	
Arkansas	Desha	Dumas			US 65 north / AR 54 west – Pine Bluff, Business District, Airport	Northern end of US 65 concurrency
Arkansas	Desha				AR 277 north	
Arkansas	Desha	Back Gate			AR 1 south to AR 277 – Watson	
Arkansas	Desha				AR 212 west	Southern end of AR 212 concurrency
Arkansas	Desha	Pendleton			AR 212 east	Northern end of AR 212 concurrency
Arkansas	Arkansas				AR 169 south – Arkansas Post National Memorial	
Arkansas	Arkansas				AR 144 west – Big Bayou Meto River Access	
Arkansas	Arkansas	Gillett			US 165B north (East Leslie Avenue)	
Arkansas	Arkansas	Gillett			US 165B south	
Arkansas	Arkansas				AR 44 east – Tichnor	
Arkansas	Arkansas				AR 152 east / AR 276 west – Bayou Meto, Deluce	
Arkansas	Arkansas	DeWitt			AR 1 north / AR 1B north – St. Charles, Marvell	
Arkansas	Arkansas	DeWitt			AR 152 east – DeWitt Business District	
Arkansas	Arkansas				AR 11 south – Reydell	
Arkansas	Arkansas	Lodge Corner			AR 276 east – Bayou Meto	
Arkansas	Arkansas				AR 152 west – Humphrey, Bayou Meto WMA	
Arkansas	Arkansas	Stuttgart			AR 130	
Arkansas	Arkansas	Stuttgart			AR 146S east	
Arkansas	Arkansas				US 79 – Pine Bluff, Clarendon	Interchange
Arkansas	Arkansas				US 63 – Hazen	
Arkansas	Prairie				AR 343 north – Slovak	
Arkansas	Lonoke	Humnoke			AR 13 – Humphrey, Carlisle	
Arkansas	Lonoke	Coy			AR 31 south – Coy, Tomberlin	Southern end of AR 31 concurrency
Arkansas	Lonoke				AR 31 north – Lonoke	Northern end of AR 31 concurrency
Arkansas	Lonoke	England			AR 15 south – Ferda	
Arkansas	Lonoke	England			AR 256 west (West Fordyce Street) – Wright	
Arkansas	Lonoke	England			AR 161 north (Purdon Street)	
Arkansas	Lonoke	Keo			AR 232 west	
Arkansas	Lonoke	Keo			AR 15 north to US 70	
Arkansas	Lonoke	Toltec			AR 386 west – Toltec Mounds Archaeological State Park	
Arkansas	Lonoke–Pulaski county line	Scott			AR 161 south – Plantation Agriculture State Museum	
Arkansas	Pulaski	North Little Rock			AR 391 north	
Arkansas	Pulaski	North Little Rock			I-440 to I-40 – Little Rock	Exit 7 on I-440
Arkansas	Pulaski	North Little Rock			US 70 to I-30 (US 65 / US 67 / US 167) / I-440	Northern terminus
1.000 mi = 1.609 km; 1.000 km = 0.621 mi: Concurrency terminus

== Special routes ==
=== Alexandria business route ===
U.S. Highway 165 Business
- Location: Alexandria and Pineville
- Length: 6.20 mi (9.98 km)
- Existed: 1926 (as US 165)–present

U.S. Highway 165 Business (officially U.S. Highway 165-Z) is a business route of U.S. Highway 165 in and near Alexandria, Louisiana, United States. It once ran along Masonic Drive in Alexandria, but has since been truncated by other routes. It currently begins at an intersection with US 71/US 165, running concurrently with LA 1. LA 1/US 165 BUS meet, and run concurrently with, LA 28 BUS before LA 1/LA 28 split from US 165 BUS.

US 165 Business then travels along Jackson Street, which is the same as its former alignment. It then crosses the Red River along the Gillis Long Bridge before meeting LA 3100. US 165 Business travels north while meeting LA 180, a former segment of the Jefferson Highway auto trail, and crossing the Pineville Expressway before ending at an intersection with its parent route.

=== Alexandria bypass route ===
U.S. Highway 165 Bypass
- Location: Bypass around Alexandria and Pineville
- Existed: 1935–1960

US 165 Bypass was the original designation for the current route of US 165 through Alexandria and Pineville. Until 1961, when it was moved to the bypass, US 165 was routed along the current business route.

=== Monroe business route ===
U.S. Highway 165 Business
- Location: Monroe, La.

Business US 165 starts a few miles south of Monroe and also becomes Jackson and Ouachita streets, going through downtown Monroe and passing by Saint Francis Medical Center and the Monroe Civic Center. It follows US 80 at Louisville Avenue, and is signed along Louisville Avenue to its terminus at US 165 (Sterlington Hwy).

Major intersections

The entire route is in Monroe, Ouachita Parish.

mi	km	Destinations	Notes
0.00	0.00	US 165	southern terminus
5.92	9.53	LA 15 (S. Second St.) to LA 594	southern end of LA 15 overlap
7.22	11.62	US 80 (Louisville Ave.) / LA 15	northern end of LA 15 overlap
8.03	12.92	To I-20 / LA 840-6 (N. 18th St.)	
9.25	14.89	LA 3275 (Breard St.)	
9.71	15.63	US 165	northern terminus
1.000 mi = 1.609 km; 1.000 km = 0.621 mi

=== Gillett business route ===
Front Street
- Location: Gillett, Arkansas
- Length: 1.28 mi (2.06 km)

U.S. Route 165 Business is a business route in Gillett. It is 1.28 miles (2.06 km) in length. The route serves mostly as Front Street and passes near the Old Gillett Jail on the National Register of Historic Places.

Major intersections

The entire route is in Gillett, Arkansas County.

mi	km	Destinations	Notes
0.00	0.00	US 165 / AR 1	southern terminus
1.28	2.06	US 165 / AR 1	northern terminus
1.000 mi = 1.609 km; 1.000 km = 0.621 mi: Concurrency terminus

== See also ==
- List of U.S. Routes
- List of U.S. Routes in Arkansas
- U.S. Route 65

Browse numbered routes
← LA 164	LA	→ US 167
← AR 164	AR	→ AR 166
