= Arkansas Highway 11 =

Highway 11

Route information
- Maintained by ArDOT
- Existed: 1926–present

Section 1
- Length: 9.57 mi (15.40 km)
- South end: US 63 / AR 35 at Pansy
- North end: US 425 near Star City

Section 2
- Length: 22.42 mi (36.08 km)
- South end: US 425 / AR 114 in Star City
- Major intersections: US 65 in Grady
- North end: Huff's Island Public Use Area

Section 3
- Length: 12.83 mi (20.65 km)
- South end: AR 88 at Reydell
- North end: US 165 near DeWitt

Section 4
- Length: 37.52 mi (60.38 km)
- South end: I-40 / US 63 in Hazen
- North end: AR 367 in Searcy

Location
- Country: United States
- State: Arkansas
- Counties: Cleveland, Lincoln, Jefferson, Arkansas, Prairie, White

Highway system
- Arkansas Highway System; Interstate; US; State; Business; Spurs; Suffixed; Scenic; Heritage
← AR 10	→ AR 12

Arkansas Highway 11 (AR 11) is a designation for four state highways in Arkansas. One segment of 9.57 miles (15.40 km) runs from U.S. Route 63 (US 63) at Pansy north to US 425 south of Star City. A second segment of 22.42 miles (36.08 km) runs from US 425 in Star City north to Huff's Island Public Use Area. A third segment of 12.83 miles (20.65 km) runs Highway 88 at Reydell north to US 165 west of Eldridge Corner. A fourth segment of 37.52 miles (60.38 km) runs from I-40 in Hazen north to Highway 367 in Searcy.

One segment of the original Arkansas Highway 11 from the state highway system's creation in 1926 has been listed on the National Register of Historic Places (NRHP) in Arkansas County.

== Route description ==
=== Pansy to Star City ===
Highway 11 begins in Cleveland County at US 63 at Pansy and runs east. The route continues northeast upon entering Lincoln County, where it terminates at US 425 south of Star City.

=== Star City to Arkansas River ===
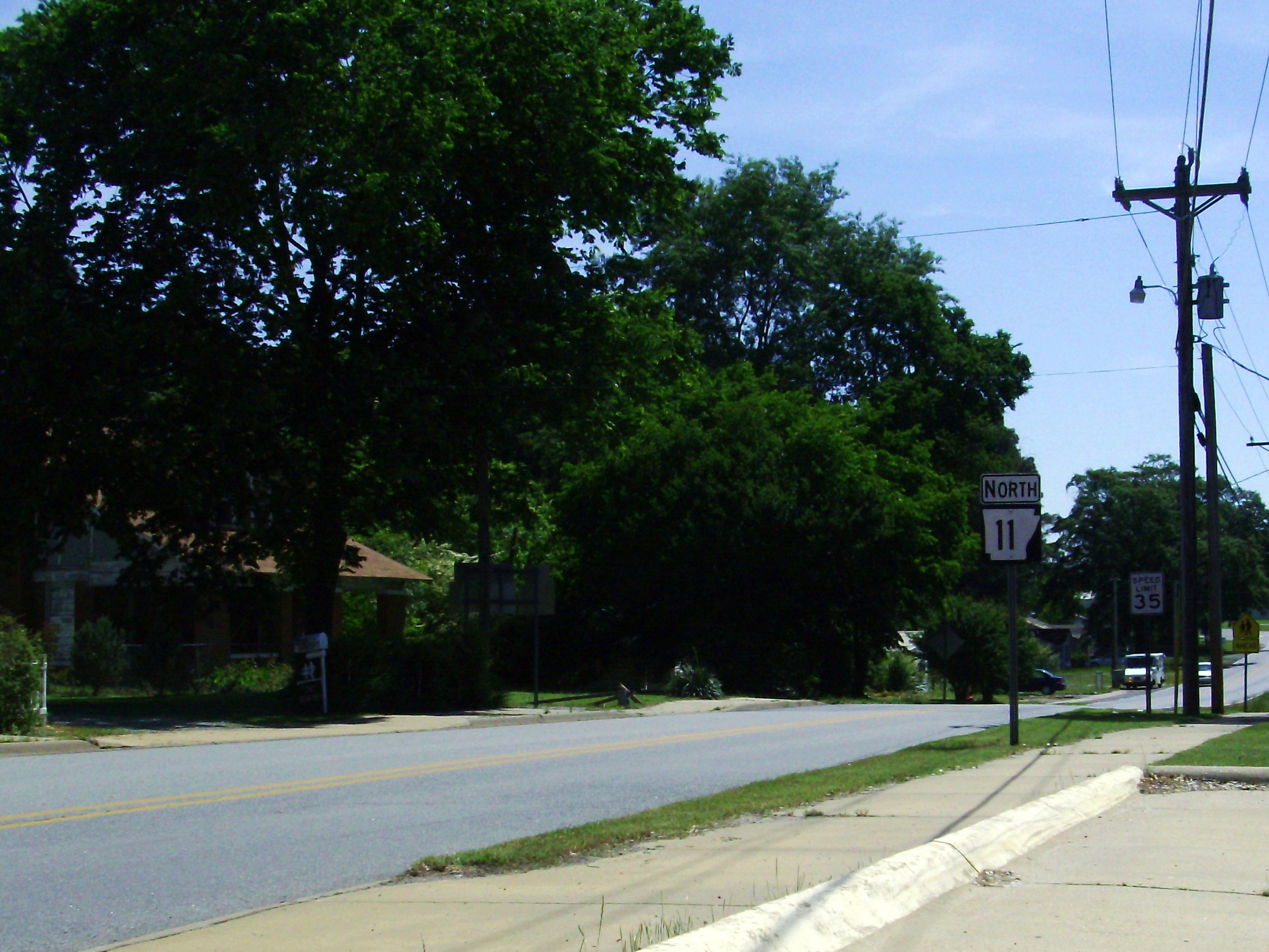
Highway 11 near the US 425 intersection in Star City, May 2014

The route begins at US 425 and Highway 114 in Star City. Highway 11 runs east until Fresno, when it turns north and meets US 65 in Grady. After Grady, the route runs north to Huff's Island Public Use Area, where it terminates.

=== Reydell to Eldridge Corner ===
The route begins at Highway 88 in Jefferson County and runs east. Upon entering Arkansas County, Highway 11 is crossed by Highway 276. The route runs north to terminate at US 165 west of Eldridge Corner.

=== Hazen to Searcy ===
The route begins at I-40/US 63 in Hazen. Highway 11 runs north until forming a 3.0 miles (4.8 km) concurrency with Highway 38 east to Des Arc. Continuing north into White County, the route runs through Griffithville and Higginson before terminating at Highway 367 at the southern limits of Searcy.

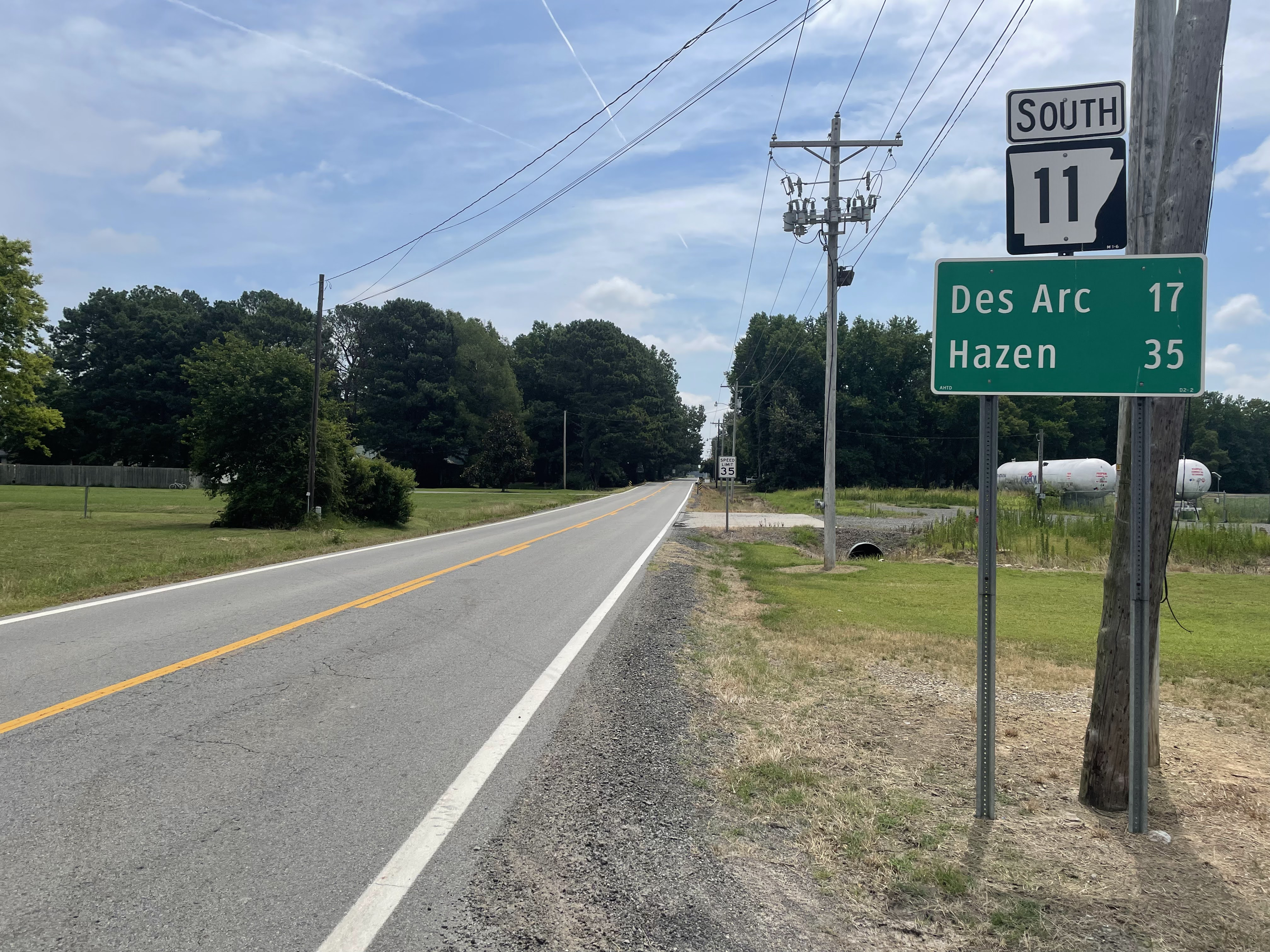
Highway 11 at Griffithville, Arkansas looking south.

- Old Arkansas 11, Kauffman Road Segment
- U.S. National Register of Historic Places
- Location within Arkansas Location within the United States
- Location: Kauffman Rd., Stuttgart, Arkansas vicinity
- Area: Arkansas County
- Built: 1916
- MPS: Arkansas Highway History and Architecture
- NRHP reference No.: 06000834
- Added to NRHP: September 2006

== History ==
Highway 11 formerly continued past its current southern terminus. The route went south to Hazen, and continued south into Arkansas County as early as 1935 and as late as 1992. Most of the route was paved by 1963.

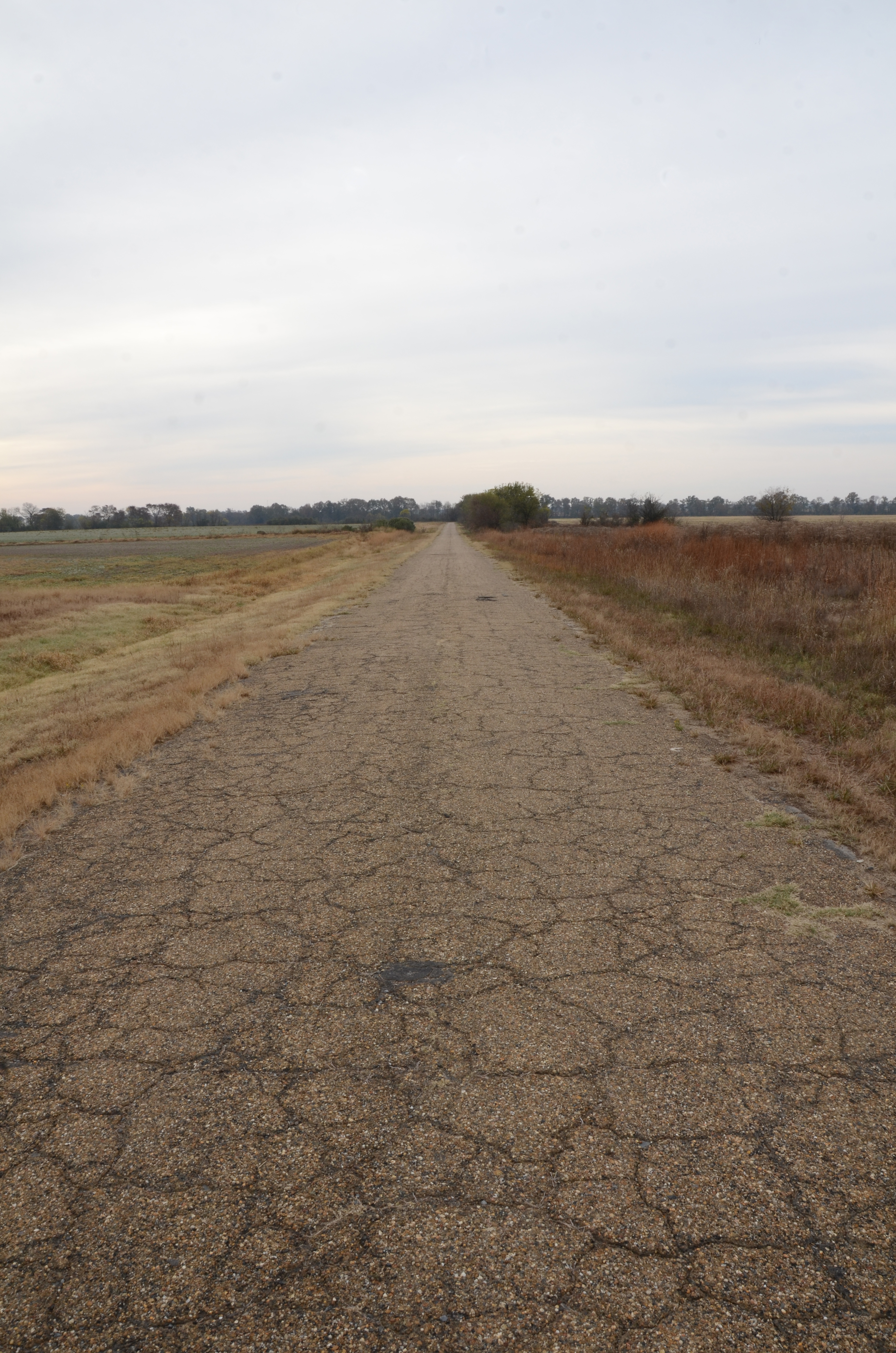
Old Highway 11, Kauffman Road Segment, November 2016

=== Kauffman Road segment ===
Kauffman Road is a former segment of 1.1 miles (1.8 km) south of Stuttgart in Arkansas County. It is listed on the National Register of Historic Places. The segment was the main automobile route in its part of Arkansas County from the time of its construction around 1916 until it was bypassed in 1955 by a new alignment (now US 165).

== Major intersections ==
Mile markers reset at concurrencies.

County	Location	mi	km	Destinations	Notes
Cleveland	Pansy	0.00	0.00	US 63 / AR 35 – Rison, Warren, Pine Bluff	Southern terminus
Lincoln		6.64	10.69	AR 11S north	Southern terminus of AR 11S
Lincoln				AR 530 north – Little Rock	Current southern terminus of AR 530; future I-530
Lincoln		9.57	15.40	US 425 – Monticello, Pine Bluff	Northern terminus
Lincoln	Gap in route				
Lincoln	Star City	0.00	0.00	US 425 / AR 114 west to AR 11B south	Southern terminus; eastern terminus of AR 114
Lincoln	Meroney	6.78	10.91	AR 293 south to AR 54	Northern terminus of AR 293
Lincoln	Fresno	8.41	13.53	AR 114 east – Gould	Western terminus of AR 114
Lincoln	Grady	17.15	27.60	US 65 – Pine Bluff, Dumas	
Lincoln		22.42	36.08	Huff's Island Public Use Area	Northern terminus
Gap in route
Jefferson	Reydell	0.00	0.00	AR 88 west – Cornerstone, Altheimer	Southern terminus; eastern terminus of AR 88
Arkansas		5.06	8.14	AR 276S north – Bayou Meto	Southern terminus of AR 276S
Arkansas		6.58	10.59	AR 343 south	Northern terminus of AR 343
Arkansas	One Horse Store	7.61	12.25	AR 276 to US 165 – Bayou Meto, DeWitt	
Arkansas		12.83	20.65	US 165 – Stuttgart, DeWitt	Northern terminus
Gap in route
Prairie	Hazen	0.00	0.00	I-40 / US 63 – Hazen, Stuttgart, Memphis, Little Rock	Southern terminus; exit 193 on I-40
Prairie		2.97	4.78	AR 249 south	Northern terminus of AR 249
Prairie	Fourmile Corner	10.97	17.65	AR 38 west – Cabot	Southern end of AR 38 concurrency
Prairie	Des Arc			AR 323 south – Des Arc Business District, Lower White River Museum State Park	Northern terminus of AR 323
Prairie	Des Arc	0.00	0.00	AR 38 east to AR 323 – Cotton Plant, Des Arc Business District	Northern end of AR 38 concurrency; access to AR 323 via AR 323Y
Prairie		3.1	5.0	Lake Des Arc	Access via AR 959-1
White	Showalters Corner	13.82	22.24	AR 323 north – West Point	Southern terminus of AR 323
White	Griffithville	16.83	27.09	AR 385 north (Main Street)	Southern terminus of AR 385
White	Higginson	25.68	41.33	AR 87 north (Main Street) – Kensett	Southern terminus of AR 87
White	Morning Sun	26.55	42.73	AR 367 – Beebe, Searcy	Northern terminus; former US 67
1.000 mi = 1.609 km; 1.000 km = 0.621 mi: Concurrency terminus

== Special routes ==
=== Star City business route ===
Highway 11B
- Location: Star City
- Length: 0.74 mi (1,190 m)

Arkansas Highway 11 Business is a business route of 0.74 miles (1.19 km) in Star City. It is known as Jefferson Street.

=== Former Hazen spur ===
Highway 11S
- Location: Hazen
- Length: 0.9 mi (1,400 m)
- Existed: c. 1992

Arkansas Highway 11 Spur was a spur route of 0.9 miles (1.4 km) in Prairie County. It was replaced by US 63S when Highway 11 was truncated at I-40 north of Hazen. The US 63S designation was subsequently removed in 2008, converting the road to a city street.

== See also ==
- List of state highways in Arkansas
- National Register of Historic Places listings in Arkansas County, Arkansas
