= One Horse Store, Arkansas =

- Unincorporated community
- One Horse Store's position in Arkansas. One Horse Store, Arkansas (the United States)
- Coordinates: 34°13′15″N 91°29′40″W
- Country: United States
- State: Arkansas
- County: Arkansas
- Elevation: 180 ft (55 m)
- Time zone: UTC-6 (Central (CST))
  - Summer (DST): UTC-5 (CDT)
- GNIS feature ID: 53049

One Horse Store is an unincorporated community in Arkansas County, Arkansas, United States. The community is located where Arkansas Highway 276 intersects Arkansas Highway 11.

== Education ==
Residents are in the DeWitt School District. It operates DeWitt High School.
