= Arkansas Highway 152 =

Designation for three segments of state highway in Arkansas County, Arkansas

Highway 152

Route information
- Maintained by ArDOT
- Existed: c. 1936-1937–present

Section 1
- Length: 13.344 mi (21.475 km)
- West end: US 79 near Humphrey
- East end: US 165 near Lodge Corner

Section 2
- Length: 0.714 mi (1,149 m)
- West end: US 165 in DeWitt
- East end: AR 1B in DeWitt

Section 3
- Length: 7.488 mi (12.051 km)
- West end: US 165 / AR 276 / Great River Road near DeWitt
- East end: AR 17 at DeLuce

Location
- Country: United States
- State: Arkansas
- Counties: Arkansas

Highway system
- Arkansas Highway System; Interstate; US; State; Business; Spurs; Suffixed; Scenic; Heritage
← AR 151	→ AR 153

Highway 152 (AR 152, Ark. 152, and Hwy. 152) is a designation for three segments of state highway in Arkansas County, Arkansas. One route of 13.3 miles (21.4 km) begins at US Highway 79 (US 79) near Humphrey and runs east to US 165. A second route of 0.7 miles (1.1 km) in DeWitt runs from US 165 east to AR 1 Business (AR 1B). A third route of 7.5 miles (12.1 km) begins at US 165 and AR 267, and the Great River Road (GRR) and runs east to Highway 17. All routes are maintained by the Arkansas State Highway and Transportation Department (AHTD).

== Route description ==
=== Humphrey to US 165 ===
AR 152 begins at US 79 east of Humphrey in western Arkansas County on the Grand Prairie. The route winds south and east, crossing Crooked Bayou and Bayou Meto just northeast of the Bayou Meto Wildlife Management Area. The highway serves as the southern terminus of AR 343 before terminating at US 165.

=== DeWitt ===
AR 152 begins in DeWitt at US 165 and runs due east as 2nd Street along the southern edge of the DeWitt Commercial Historic District. The route passes a residential neighborhood before intersecting AR 130 (Monroe Street). Continuing east, AR 152 passes through the southern part of downtown DeWitt before terminating at AR 1B.

=== US 165 to DeLuce ===
The route begins at US 165 in southern Arkansas County. AR 152 runs east through rural territory, passing through the unincorporated community of Prairie Union before an intersection with a discontinuous section of AR 17, where the route terminates.

== History ==
Highway 152 was numbered as Arkansas Highway 82 from 1926 until 1933, when it was renumbered Arkansas Highway 152 to avoid conflict with the newly extended US 82.

== Major intersections ==
The entire route is in Arkansas County.

Location	mi	km	Destinations	Notes
	0.000	0.000	US 79 – Stuttgart, Pine Bluff	Western terminus
	10.774	17.339	AR 343 north – Stuttgart	AR 343 southern terminus
	13.344	21.475	US 165 – DeWitt, Stuttgart	Eastern terminus
Gap in route
DeWitt	0.000	0.000	US 165 – Dumas, Stuttgart	Western terminus
DeWitt	0.572	0.921	AR 130 (Monroe Street) – Almyra	
DeWitt	0.714	1.149	AR 1B (2nd Street/Jefferson Street)	Eastern terminus
Gap in route
	0.000	0.000	US 165 / AR 276 / Great River Road – DeWitt, Dumas, Bayou Meto	Western terminus
DeLuce	7.488	12.051	AR 17	Eastern terminus
1.000 mi = 1.609 km; 1.000 km = 0.621 mi
