= Arkansas Highway 276 =

State highway in Arkansas, United States

Highway 276
- Sections of Highway 276 in red, Highway 276S in blue

Route information
- Maintained by ArDOT
- Existed: April 24, 1963–present

Section 1
- Length: 1.62 mi (2.61 km)
- South end: Gregory Fisher Road / Lennox Road in Stuttgart
- North end: US 79B in Stuttgart

Section 2
- Length: 16.17 mi (26.02 km)
- South end: US 165 at Lodge Corner
- North end: US 165 / AR 1 / Great River Road / AR 152 at Indiana

Location
- Country: United States
- State: Arkansas
- Counties: Arkansas

Highway system
- Arkansas Highway System; Interstate; US; State; Business; Spurs; Suffixed; Scenic; Heritage
← AR 275	→ AR 277

Highway 276 (AR 276, Ark. 276, and Hwy. 276) is a designation for two state highways in Arkansas County, Arkansas. One route is a short industrial access road in south Stuttgart. A second route begins at US Highway 165 (US 165) at Lodge Corner and runs 16.17 miles (26.02 km) to US 165/AR 1/AR 152 south of De Witt. A spur route, designated Highway 267S, runs south at Bayou Meto to connect to Highway 11. All three routes are maintained by the Arkansas Department of Transportation (ArDOT).

== Route description ==
=== Stuttgart ===
Highway 276 begins at a county road intersection with Gregory Fisher Road and Lennox Road at the southern edge of Stuttgart. The highway runs north as Buerkle Street, named for George Adam Buerkle, the founder of Stuttgart. Highway 276 runs north as a section line road, passing an industrial facility, Stuttgart Junion High School, Stuttgart High School, and the school's athletic fields before an intersection with US 79B, where the route terminates. As of 2016, the route had an annual average daily traffic (AADT) of 2,700 vehicles per day (VPD).

=== Lodge Corner to Indiana ===
Highway 276 begins at US 165 at Lodge Corner on the Arkansas Grand Prairie. The route runs due south through Hagler to Bayou Meto, where Highway 276S begins southbound. Highway 276 runs due east as a section line road through agricultural areas. As the route approaches Mill Bayou, the highway passes hunting lodges for hunters seeking the waterfowl of the Mississippi Flyway. It passes a large rice mill before intersecting US 165/AR 1, a principal north–south highway in the region also designated as the Great River Road, a National Scenic Byway, and Highway 152.

== History ==
Highway 276 was created by the Arkansas State Highway Commission (ASHC) on April 24, 1963 between Lodge Corner and Indiana. The spur route was created on June 23, 1965. The Stuttgart route was created October 23, 1974.

== Major intersections ==
Mile markers reset at some concurrencies. The entire route is in Arkansas County.

Location	mi	km	Destinations	Notes
Stuttgart	0.00	0.00	Gregory Fisher Road / Lennox Road	Southern terminus
Stuttgart	1.00	1.61	US 79B (22nd Street)	Northern terminus
Gap in route
Lodge Corner	0.00	0.00	US 165 – Stuttgart, De Witt	Southern terminus
Bayou Meto	5.35	8.61	AR 276S south	AR 276S northern terminus
One Horse Store	6.88	11.07	AR 11 – Reydell	
Indiana	16.17	26.02	US 165 / AR 1 / Great River Road / AR 152 east – De Witt, Gillett, DeLuce	Southern terminus, AR 152 western terminus
1.000 mi = 1.609 km; 1.000 km = 0.621 mi

== Bayou Meto spur ==
Highway 276S
- Location: Bayou Meto
- Length: 1.06 mi (1.71 km)
- Existed: June 23, 1965–present

Highway 276Y Spur (AR 276S, Ark. 276S, Hwy. 276S) is a 1.06-mile (1.71 km) spur route at Bayou Meto in southern Arkansas County. The route provides access to Highway 11. It was created by the ASHC on June 23, 1965.

Major intersections

The entire route is in Bayou Meto, Arkansas County.

mi	km	Destinations	Notes
0.00	0.00	AR 276 – Lodge Corner	Northern terminus
1.06	1.71	AR 11 – Reydell	Southern terminus
1.000 mi = 1.609 km; 1.000 km = 0.621 mi
