= Arkansas Highway 82 =

Arkansas Highway 82 may refer to:

- Arkansas Highway 82 (1926), now numbered 152
- U.S. Route 82 in Arkansas, entered Arkansas ca. 1933
