= Arkansas County, Arkansas =

County in Arkansas, United States

County of Arkansas
- County
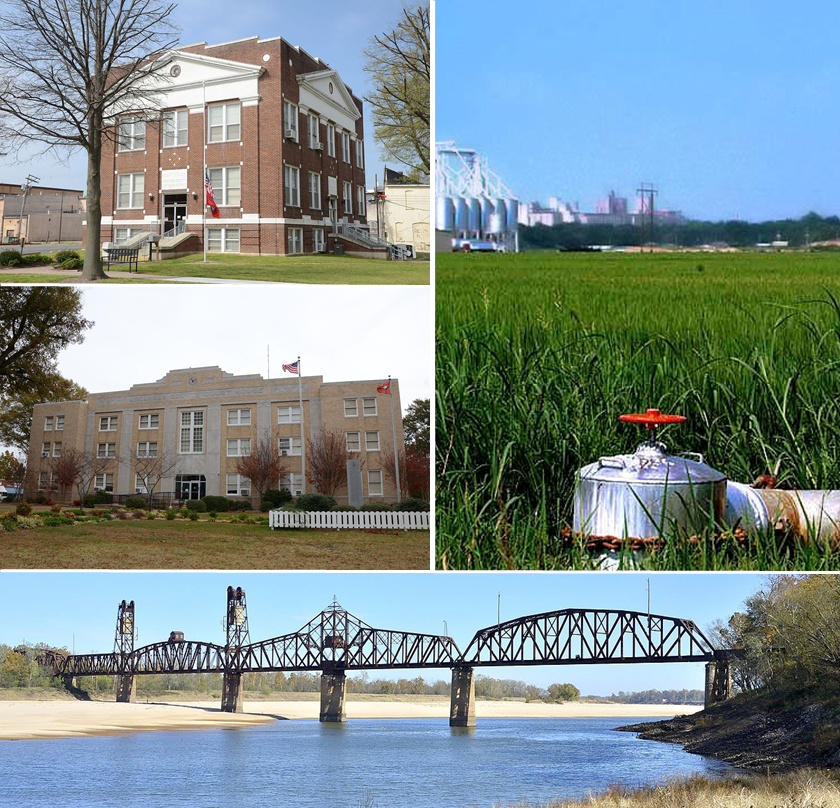
- Clockwise from top: a rice field on the Grand Prairie, the Yancopin Bridge over the Arkansas River, the Southern District Courthouse in DeWitt, the Northern District Courthouse in Stuttgart

- Location within the U.S. state of Arkansas
- Country: United States
- State: Arkansas
- Established: December 13, 1813 (212 years ago)
- Named for: Arkansas River
- Seat: Stuttgart (north district); De Witt (south district)
- Largest city: Stuttgart

Area
  - Total: 1,033.79 sq mi (2,677.5 km^{2})
  - Land: 988.49 sq mi (2,560.2 km^{2})
  - Water: 45.30 sq mi (117.3 km^{2}) 4.4%

Population (2020)
  - Total: 17,149
  - Estimate (2025): 15,836 ▼
  - Density: 17.349/sq mi (6.6984/km^{2})
- Time zone: UTC−6 (Central)
  - Summer (DST): UTC−5 (CDT)
- Congressional district: 1st
- Website: arcounties.org/counties/arkansas/

Arkansas County, officially the County of Arkansas, is a county located in the U.S. state of Arkansas. As of the 2020 census, the population was 17,149. Located in the Arkansas Delta, the county has two county seats, DeWitt and Stuttgart.

The first of the state's 75 present-day counties to be created, Arkansas County was formed from New Madrid County on December 13, 1813, when this area was part of the Missouri Territory. The county was named after the Arkansas River (itself named for the Arkansas tribe), as was the subsequent Arkansas Territory which was later split off from Missouri Territory and eventually admitted to the union as a state. The riverfront areas in the Arkansas Delta were developed for cotton plantations that used enslaved African Americans. Cotton was the major commodity crop before and after the Civil War. Since then, the county lies within the largest rice-growing region in the United States.

Arkansas County is one of seven present-day counties in the United States that have the same name as the state in which they are located.

== History ==
The Roland Site is an archaeological site located in an extinct channel of the White River in Arkansas County. It was inhabited intermittently from the beginning of the common era to late prehistoric times, but its most intensive inhabitation was by peoples of the Plum Bayou culture (650 to 1050 CE), in a time known as the Late Woodland period.

=== European settlement and conflict (1686–1804) ===
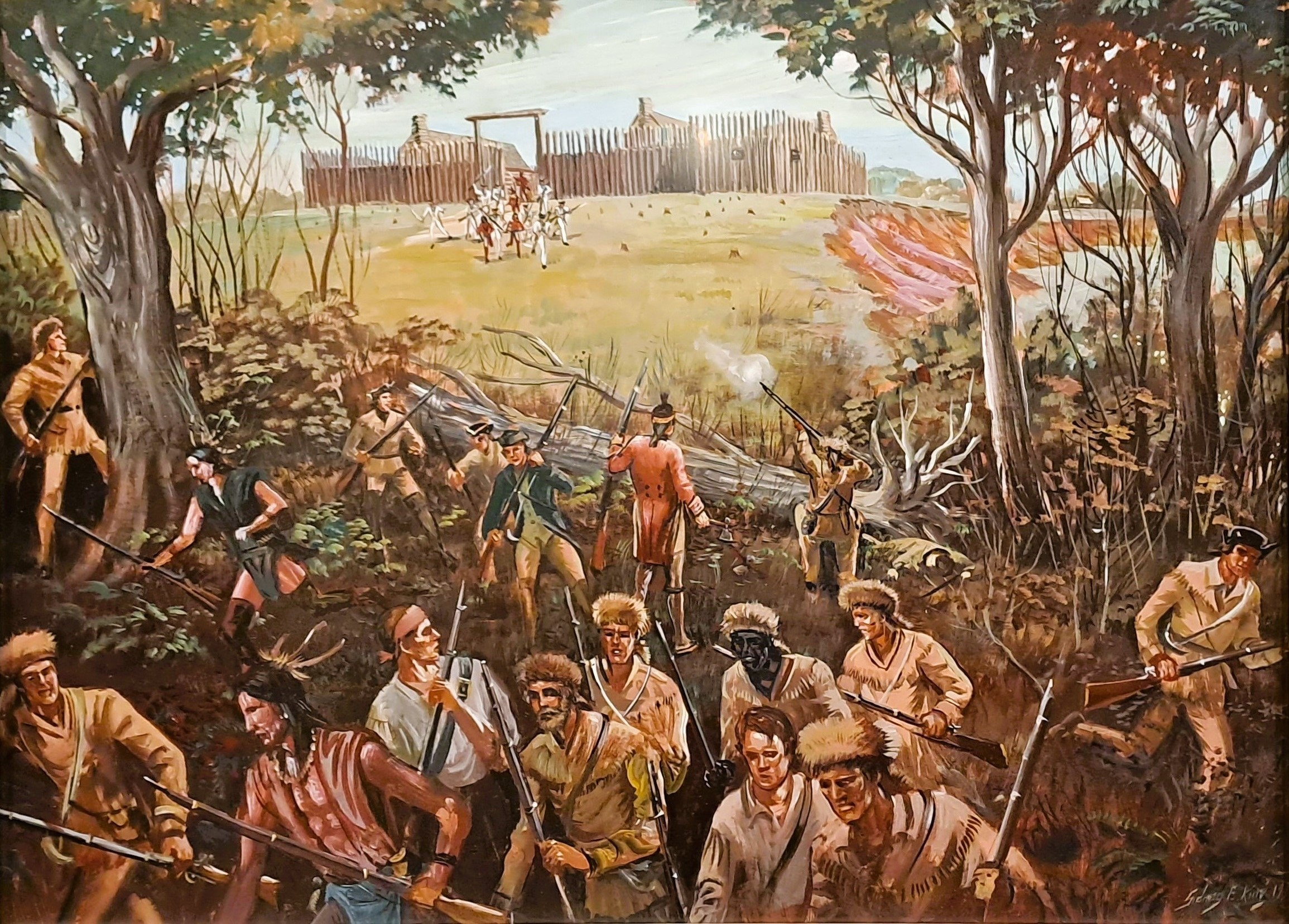
Depiction of Colbert's raid, the only American Revolutionary War battle fought within present-day Arkansas

Arkansas Post was the site of a colonial trading post, used for negotiating and trading with tribes to the west, all of whom were allies of the French. However, to the east, the Chickasaw and Choctaw were enemies of the French (the Chickasaw and Choctaw were allied to the British.) The tribe in the area who the French traded with the most were the Quapaw. On May 10, 1749, Arkansas Post was attacked by Chickasaw warriors. The Chickasaw burned the settlement, killed many men, and took women and children as captives. In response to the attack, the French moved the post to Ecores Rouges.

After the French were defeated in the French and Indian War, Louisiana was surrendered to the Spanish. However, they made no effort assert actual control over the province, and all Europeans present during the Spanish era were French fur traders who had simply stayed behind.

=== Westward expansion and the Civil War (1804–1865) ===
Napoleon Bonaparte's French army conquered Spain, and Napoleon made his brother the new king of Spain. Napoleon's brother, acting as king of Spain, then "gave" the Louisiana territory back to France. Arkansas County was created by the Missouri Territorial Legislature on December 31, 1813. It was called Arkansas after the Arkansas River, and the Arkansas tribe of Native Americans. It is one of seven current counties that have the same name as the state in which it is located. (Note: Hawaii County, Idaho County, Iowa County, New York County, Oklahoma County, and Utah County.)

Its original boundaries were New Madrid County to the north, Louisiana to the south, the Mississippi River to the east, and the Indian Boundary Line south of Fort Clark to the west. Arkansas County was within the Missouri Territory until creation of the Arkansas Territory on March 2, 1819. The county seat was moved from Arkansas Post to DeWitt, a newly established town created at the request of the Arkansas County Quorum Court on February 19, 1853. County government officially held court for the first time in DeWitt in October 1855.

This area was developed for cotton plantations through the antebellum period, based on the labor of enslaved African-American workers. Major planters earned considerable wealth with the commodity crop, for which there was high demand. Citizens of the county supported the Secession Convention to discuss secession from the Union in 1861 by an 80% to 20% margin. The anti-immediate secession delegates negotiated a compromise to put the question on the statewide ballot in August, but to remain in the Union.

Following President Lincoln's 1861 militia call after the Confederate seizure of Fort Sumter, citizens of several counties (including Arkansas County) formed volunteer companies to capture the U.S. Arsenal at Little Rock. Arkansas County initially sent two companies to serve in what would become Company H ("Crockett Rifles") and Company K ("DeWitt Guards") of the First Arkansas Infantry Regiment. A third volunteer company ("Dixie Grays") joined the Sixth Arkansas Infantry Regiment.

=== Reconstruction and the 20th century (1865–1999) ===
In the post-Reconstruction era, whites directed considerable violence against African Americans, in an effort to restore and maintain white supremacy after Democrats regained power. At the turn of the century, the state legislature passed measures that effectively disenfranchised most blacks for decades. The Equal Justice Initiative reported in 2015 that the county had 18 lynchings of African Americans from 1877 to 1950, most in the decades near the turn of the 20th century. This was the most of any county other than Phillips, where the Elaine massacre is believed to have resulted in more than 200 deaths of African Americans.

To escape the violence and social oppression, thousands of African Americans left the state in the Great Migration to northern industrial cities. They migrated beginning around World War I, increasing the number leaving during and after World War II, when rural jobs had been reduced.

== Geography ==
Arkansas County is located in the Arkansas Delta (in Arkansas, usually referred to as "the Delta") a subregion of the Mississippi Alluvial Plain, which is a flat area consisting of rich, fertile sediment deposits from the Mississippi River between Louisiana and Illinois.

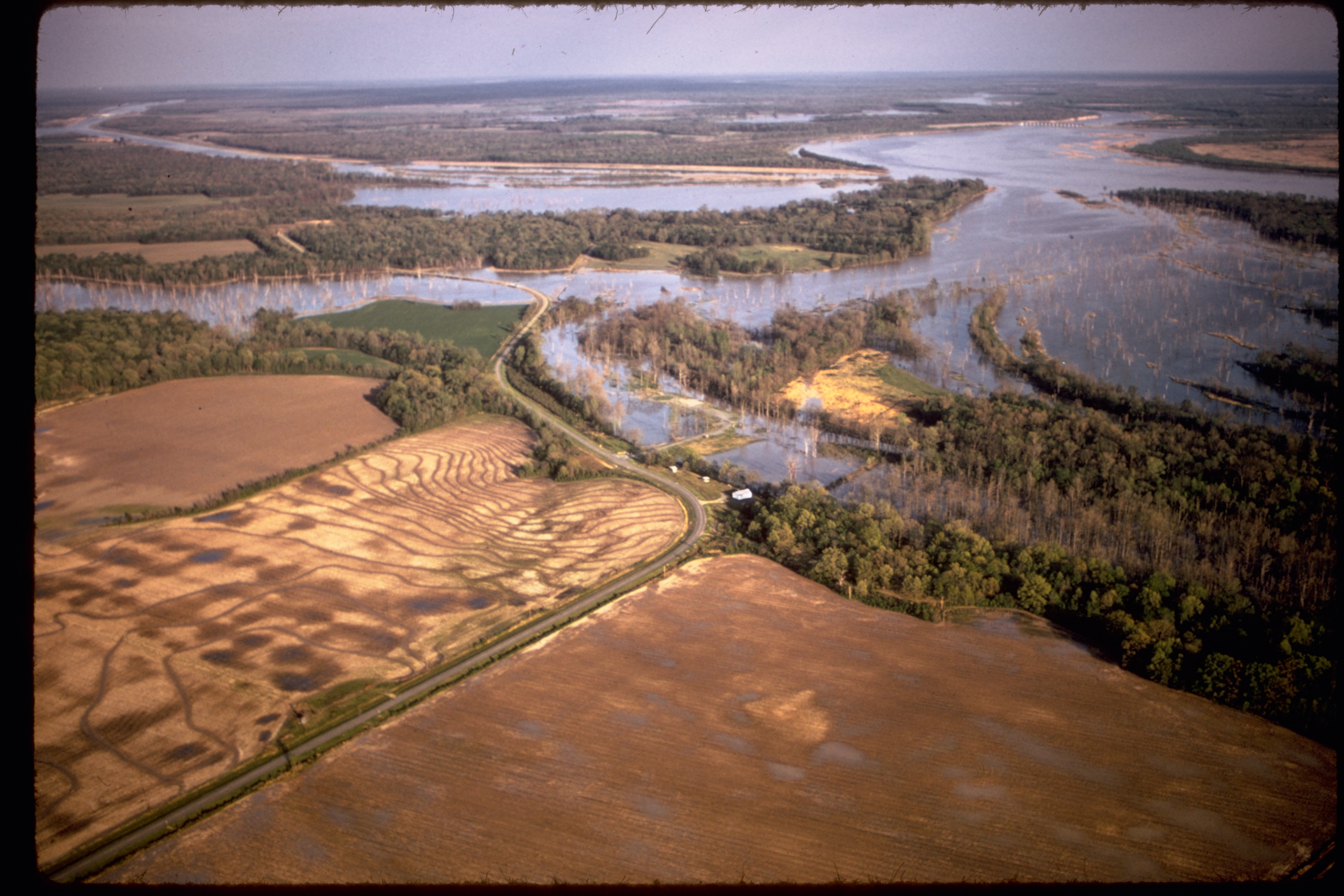
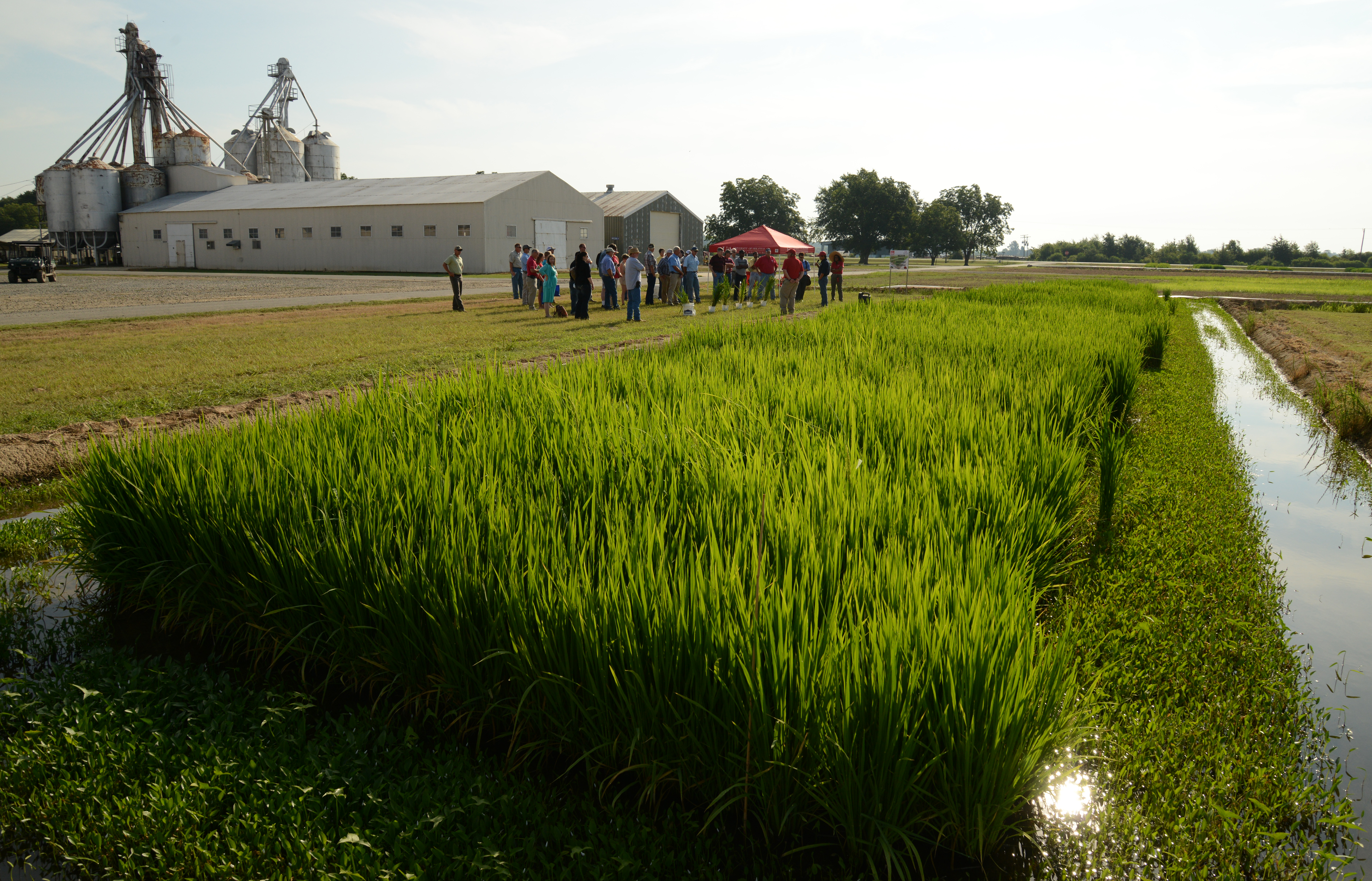
Top: Aerial view of the confluence of the Arkansas and White Rivers, with typical forested riparian boundary, trees, and oxbow lakes.
Bottom: Rice field near Stuttgart.

Within the Delta, Arkansas County is almost entirely within the Grand Prairie subregion, historically a flat grassland plain underlain by an impermeable clay layer (the Stuttgart soil series). Prior to the 19th century, flatter areas with slowly to very slowly permeable soils (often containing fragipans) supported Arkansas's largest prairie, covered in prairie grasses and forbs, with oaks covering the low hills and ridges, and pockets of floodplains with bottomland hardwood forests. This region was a sharp contrast to the bottomland forests that once dominated other parts of the Mississippi Alluvial Plain. Cropland has now largely replaced the native vegetation. Distinctively, rice is the main crop; soybeans, cotton, corn, and wheat are also grown. The rice fields provide habitat and forage for large numbers and many species of waterfowl; duck and goose hunting occurs at this important spot along the Mississippi Flyway.

Two different eco-regions border the Grand Prairie along the major rivers forming the county's east and southern boundaries: the Arkansas River Holocene Meander Belt and the Western Lowlands Holocene Meanders. These areas of flat floodplain contain the meander belts of the present and past watercourses, point bars, natural levees, swales, and abandoned river channels. Some of the most extensive remaining tracts of native bottomland hardwood forest in the Mississippi Alluvial Plain remain along these rivers. Along the banks of the White River in Arkansas County, these forests are preserved in the White River National Wildlife Refuge.

According to the U.S. Census Bureau, the county has a total area of 1,033.79 square miles (2,677.5 km^{2}), of which 988.49 square miles (2,560.2 km^{2}) is land and 45.30 square miles (117.3 km^{2}) (4.4%) is water.

The county is located approximately 55 miles (89 km) east of Little Rock, 112 miles (180 km) southwest of Memphis, Tennessee, and 367 miles (591 km) northeast of the Dallas-Fort Worth Metroplex (DFW) in Texas. (Note: Mileages from Arkansas County to Little Rock, Memphis, and DFW are based on highway miles using northern district county seat Stuttgart for Arkansas County.) Arkansas County is surrounded by Prairie County to the north, Monroe County to the northeast, Phillips County to the east, Desha County to the south, Lincoln County to the southwest, Jefferson County to the west, and Lonoke County to the northwest.

=== Hydrology ===
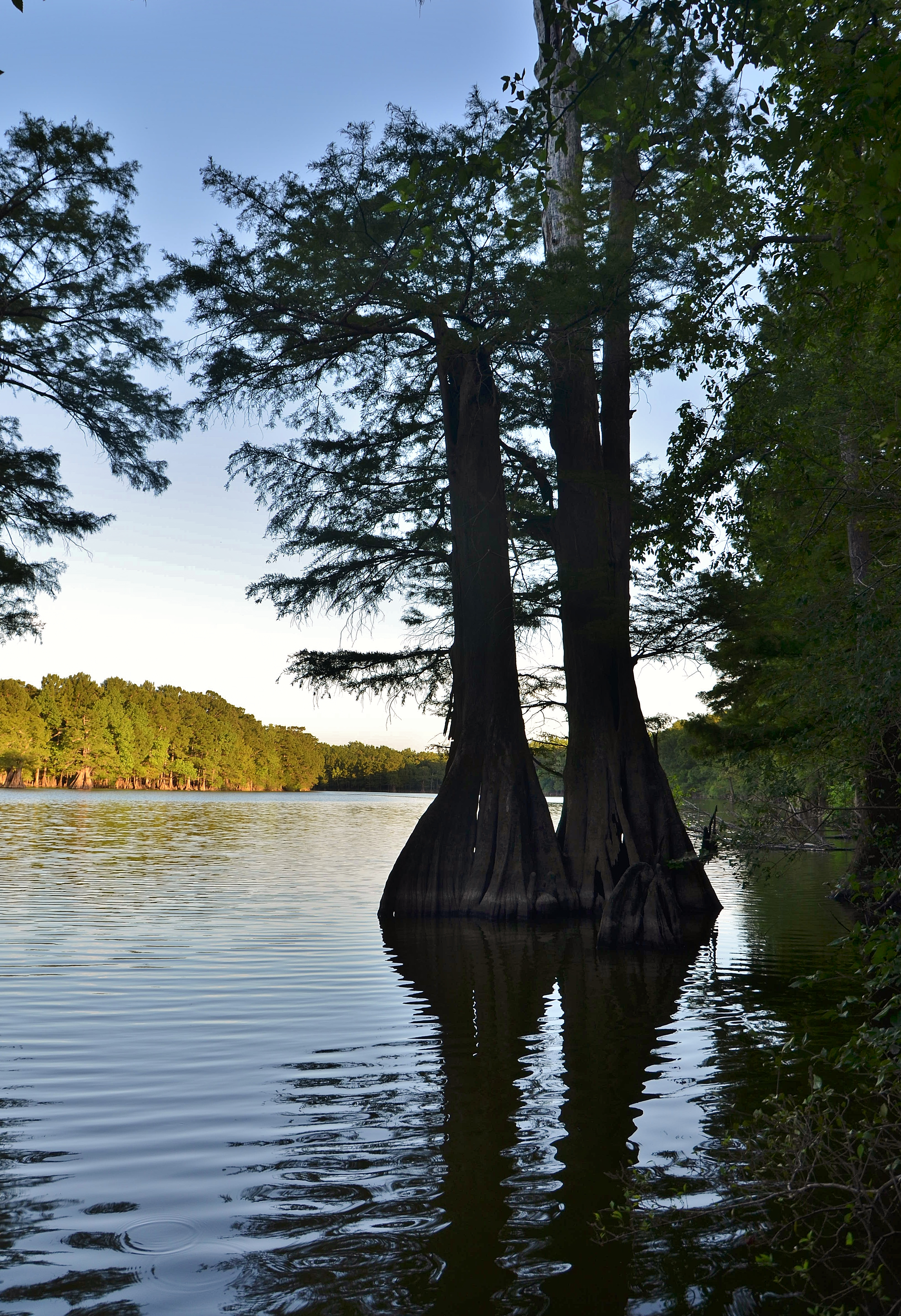
Bald cypress trees along the shores of Lower White Lake

Water is an extremely important part of Arkansas County's geography, history, economy, and culture. The many rivers, streams, and ditches crossing the county have featured prominently since prehistoric times, and many of the hundreds of archaeological sites, including the Menard–Hodges site, are along waterways. The navigability of the Arkansas River has been important for every civilization in Arkansas County since prehistory. Tribes of Quapaw, Casqui, and Mississippian cultures were settled in the area along the rivers. Three major rivers form much of the county's boundaries: Arkansas River, Bayou Meto, and the White River. Within the county, La Grue Bayou is an important watercourse.

Rivers brought early prosperity to the county during white settlement for navigation. The county saw battles for control of the rivers during the American Revolution in 1783 at Arkansas Post, and the Civil War in 1862 and 1863 at Saint Charles and Fort Hindman, respectively.

=== Protected areas ===
Several agencies own and maintain areas of natural and cultural value for enjoyment and use by residents and visitors of Arkansas County. Along the county's eastern boundary, 99.3 square miles (257 km^{2}) of the Dale Bumpers White River National Wildlife Refuge protect Mississippi lowland forests along the White River. In the western part of the county, 39.3 square miles (102 km^{2}) of the George H. Dunklin Jr. Bayou Meto Wildlife Management Area is managed by the Arkansas Game and Fish Commission to preserve natural woodlands and wetlands for wintering waterfowl within the Mississippi Flyway. At the southern tip of the county, the bottomland hardwood forest area between the Arkansas and White is preserved in the Trusten Holder WMA. The area is well known for hunting and fishing, and bald eagle watching in winter. The AGFC also maintains the Ethel WMA, a 176-acre (71 ha) area known for small game hunting, formerly open only to residents of Ethel.

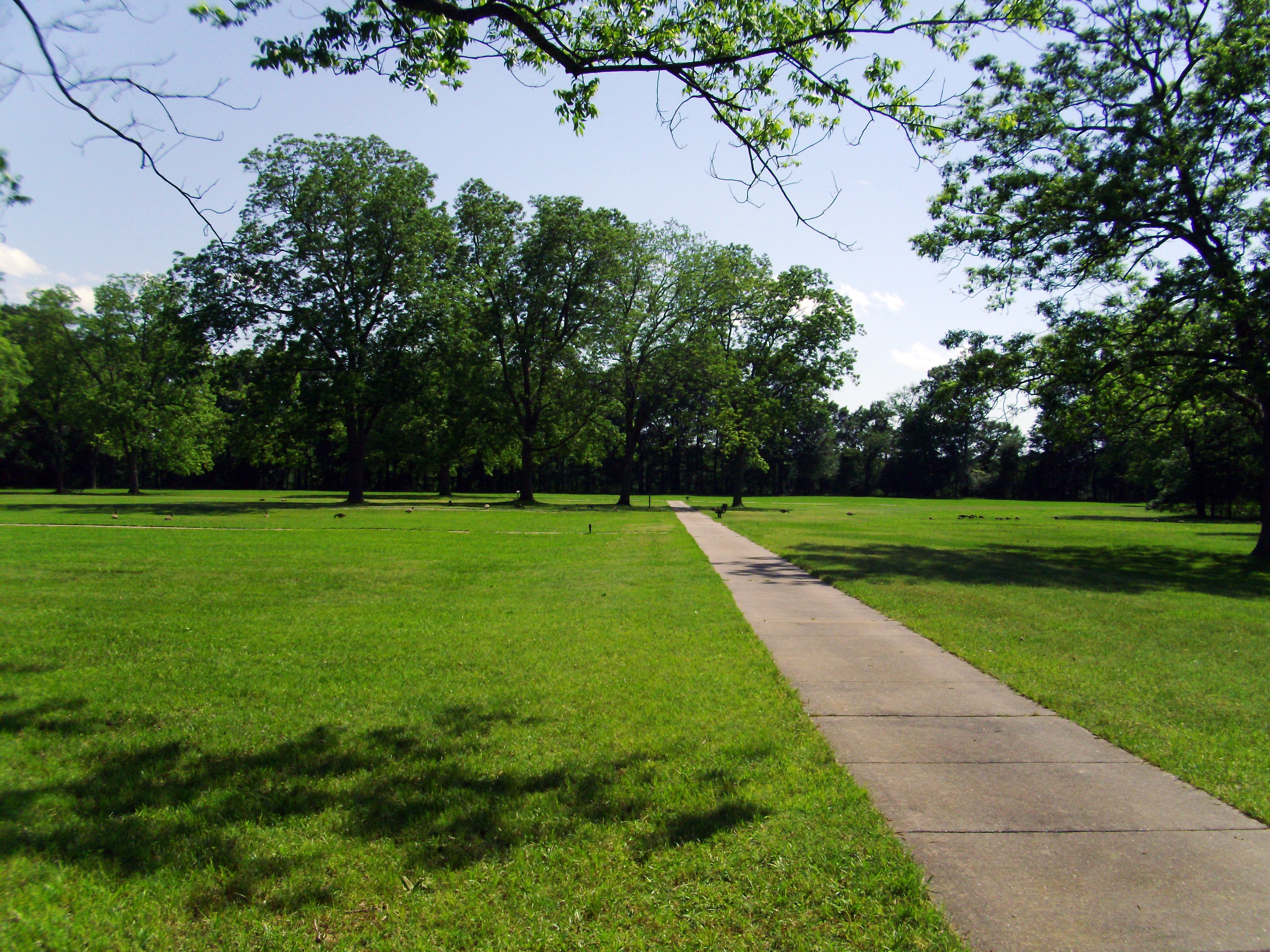
A "ghost" townsite is laid out at Arkansas Post National Memorial, marking original locations of homes, blacksmith shops, and Arkansas's first territorial capitol.

The Arkansas Natural Heritage Commission maintains two small sites in Arkansas County: the Roth Prairie Natural Area and the Striplin Woods Natural Area. Roth Prairie is a flat 41 acres (17 ha) plot south of Stuttgart, one of the few remaining tallgrass prairies typical of the Grand Prairie prior to leveling and clearing for human settlement. Striplin Woods preserves a very biodiverse section of old growth bottomland hardwood forest along the White River located within the White River NWR, and is comanaged with the U.S. Fish and Wildlife Service.

Along the Arkansas, the U.S. Army Corps of Engineers maintains a total of 160 campgrounds at Merrisach, Notrebes Bend, Pendleton Bend, and Wilbur D. Mills Use Areas, each with electric hookups, boat ramps, and restroom facilities. The Corps also maintains the Moore Bayou Day Use Area on the Arkansas, providing access to the Arkansas Post Water Trail, and Wild Goose Bayou Day Use Area on the Arkansas Canal.

The primary cultural site in Arkansas County is Arkansas Post, the historic entrepot near the confluence of the Arkansas and Mississippi Rivers, and early epicenter of European settlement in the region. Founded in 1686, Arkansas Post was established at various sites near the confluence, often moving after flood events. Though remains of the post have been lost by movements of the Arkansas River, a small townsite is preserved as the Arkansas Post National Memorial. The nearby Arkansas Post State Park preserves the history of early settlement on the Grand Prairie through a five-building museum. The central structure is the 1877 Refeld-Hinman dogtrot house.

== Demographics ==
The peak of population in the rural county was 1940. Mechanization and industrial-scale agriculture reduced the number of farm workers, and people have moved away because of the lack of opportunities.

Historical population
Census	Pop.	Note	%±
1830	1,426		—
1840	1,346		−5.6%
1850	3,245		141.1%
1860	8,844		172.5%
1870	8,268		−6.5%
1880	8,038		−2.8%
1890	11,432		42.2%
1900	12,973		13.5%
1910	16,103		24.1%
1920	21,483		33.4%
1930	22,300		3.8%
1940	24,437		9.6%
1950	23,665		−3.2%
1960	23,355		−1.3%
1970	23,347		0.0%
1980	24,175		3.5%
1990	21,653		−10.4%
2000	20,749		−4.2%
2010	19,019		−8.3%
2020	17,149		−9.8%
2025 (est.)	15,836	▼	−7.7%
U.S. Decennial Census; 1790–1960 1900–1990; 1990–2000 2020

=== 2020 Census ===
Arkansas County racial composition
Race	Number	Percentage
White (non-Hispanic)	11,575	67.5%
Black or African American (non-Hispanic)	4,138	24.13%
Native American	34	0.2%
Asian	94	0.55%
Pacific Islander	9	0.05%
Other/mixed	663	3.87%
Hispanic or Latino	636	3.71%

As of the 2020 census, the county had a population of 17,149. The median age was 43.2 years. 22.5% of residents were under the age of 18 and 20.7% of residents were 65 years of age or older. For every 100 females there were 94.4 males, and for every 100 females age 18 and over there were 92.3 males age 18 and over.

47.4% of residents lived in urban areas, while 52.6% lived in rural areas.

There were 7,293 households in the county, of which 29.1% had children under the age of 18 living in them. Of all households, 42.2% were married-couple households, 20.9% were households with a male householder and no spouse or partner present, and 30.8% were households with a female householder and no spouse or partner present. About 32.5% of all households were made up of individuals and 15.3% had someone living alone who was 65 years of age or older.

There were 8,671 housing units, of which 15.9% were vacant. Among occupied housing units, 65.7% were owner-occupied and 34.3% were renter-occupied. The homeowner vacancy rate was 2.3% and the rental vacancy rate was 10.0%.

=== 2010 Census ===
Racial/ethnic makeup of Arkansas County treating Hispanics as a separate category (2018)
1. White non-Hispanic (70.0%)
2. Black non-Hispanic (25.8%)
3. Native American non-Hispanic (0.10%)
4. Asian non-Hispanic (0.00%)
5. Pacific Islander non-Hispanic (0.00%)
6. Other non-Hispanic (0.00%)
7. Two or more races non-Hispanic (1.00%)
8. Hispanic any race (3.10%)

As of the 2010 census, there were 19,019 people, 8,005 households, and 5,306 families residing in the county. The population density was 18 people per square mile (6.9 people/km^{2}). There were 9,436 housing units at an average density of 9 units per square mile (3.5 units/km^{2}). The racial makeup of the county was 71.8% White, 24.5% Black or African American, 0.5% Asian, 0.2% Native American, 0% Pacific Islander, 1.7% from other races, and 1.3% from two or more races. 2.7% of the population were Hispanic or Latino of any race.

There were 8,005 households, out of which 30.9% had children under the age of 18 living with them, 46.4% were married couples living together, 15.3% had a female householder with no husband present, and 33.7% were non-families. 29.4% of all households were made up of individuals, and 12.6% had someone living alone who was 65 years of age or older. The average household size was 2.35 and the average family size was 2.87.

In the county, the population was spread out, with 23.3% under the age of 18, 7.6% from 18 to 24, 24.2% from 25 to 44, 28.6% from 45 to 64, and 16.5% who were 65 years of age or older. The median age was 40.7 years. For every 100 females there were 94.1 males. For every 100 females age 18 and over, there were 90.9 males.

The median income for a household in the county was $37,230, and the median income for a family was $48,698. Males had a median income of $37,489 versus $25,607 for females. The per capita income for the county was $22,142. About 13.1% of families and 18.9% of the population were below the poverty line, including 21.5% of those under age 18 and 16.7% of those age 65 or over.

In 2010, the largest denominational group was the Evangelical Protestants (with 7,709 adherents) and Mainline Protestants (with 2,500 adherents). Almost 29% of people in the county did not claim a religious tradition. The largest religious bodies were The Southern Baptist Convention (with 6,332 members) and The United Methodist Church (with 1,976 members).

=== 2000 Census ===
As of the 2000 census, there were 20,749 people, 8,457 households, and 5,970 families residing in the county. The population density was 21 people per square mile (8.1 people/km^{2}). There were 9,672 housing units at an average density of 10 units per square mile (3.9 units/km^{2}). The racial makeup of the county was 75.19% White, 23.36% Black or African American, 0.21% Native American, 0.36% Asian, 0.21% from other races, and 0.66% from two or more races. 0.76% of the population were Hispanic or Latino of any race.

There were 8,457 households, out of which 31.40% had children under the age of 18 living with them, 53.00% were married couples living together, 13.90% had a female householder with no husband present, and 29.40% were non-families. 26.10% of all households were made up of individuals, and 12.40% had someone living alone who was 65 years of age or older. The average household size was 2.41 and the average family size was 2.89.

In the county, the population was spread out, with 24.80% under the age of 18, 8.30% from 18 to 24, 26.30% from 25 to 44, 24.40% from 45 to 64, and 16.20% who were 65 years of age or older. The median age was 39 years. For every 100 females there were 90.90 males. For every 100 females age 18 and over, there were 86.00 males.

The median income for a household in the county was $30,316, and the median income for a family was $36,472. Males had a median income of $28,914 versus $21,127 for females. The per capita income for the county was $16,401. About 14.10% of families and 17.80% of the population were below the poverty line, including 24.80% of those under age 18 and 15.50% of those age 65 or over.

In 2000, the largest denominational group was the Evangelical Protestants (with 10,229 adherents) and Mainline Protestants (with 3,593 adherents). The largest religious bodies were the Southern Baptist Convention (with 5,103 members) and the United Methodist Church (with 2,750 members).

== Human resources ==
=== Education ===
Educational attainment in Arkansas County is typical for a rural Arkansas county, with a 2016 study finding 82.5% of Arkansas County residents over age 25 held a high school degree or higher, below Arkansas and national averages of 85.2% and 87.0%, respectively. Arkansas County's proportion of population holding a bachelor's degree or higher is 14.4%, significantly below the state average of 21.5% and national average of 30.3%.

==== Primary and secondary education ====
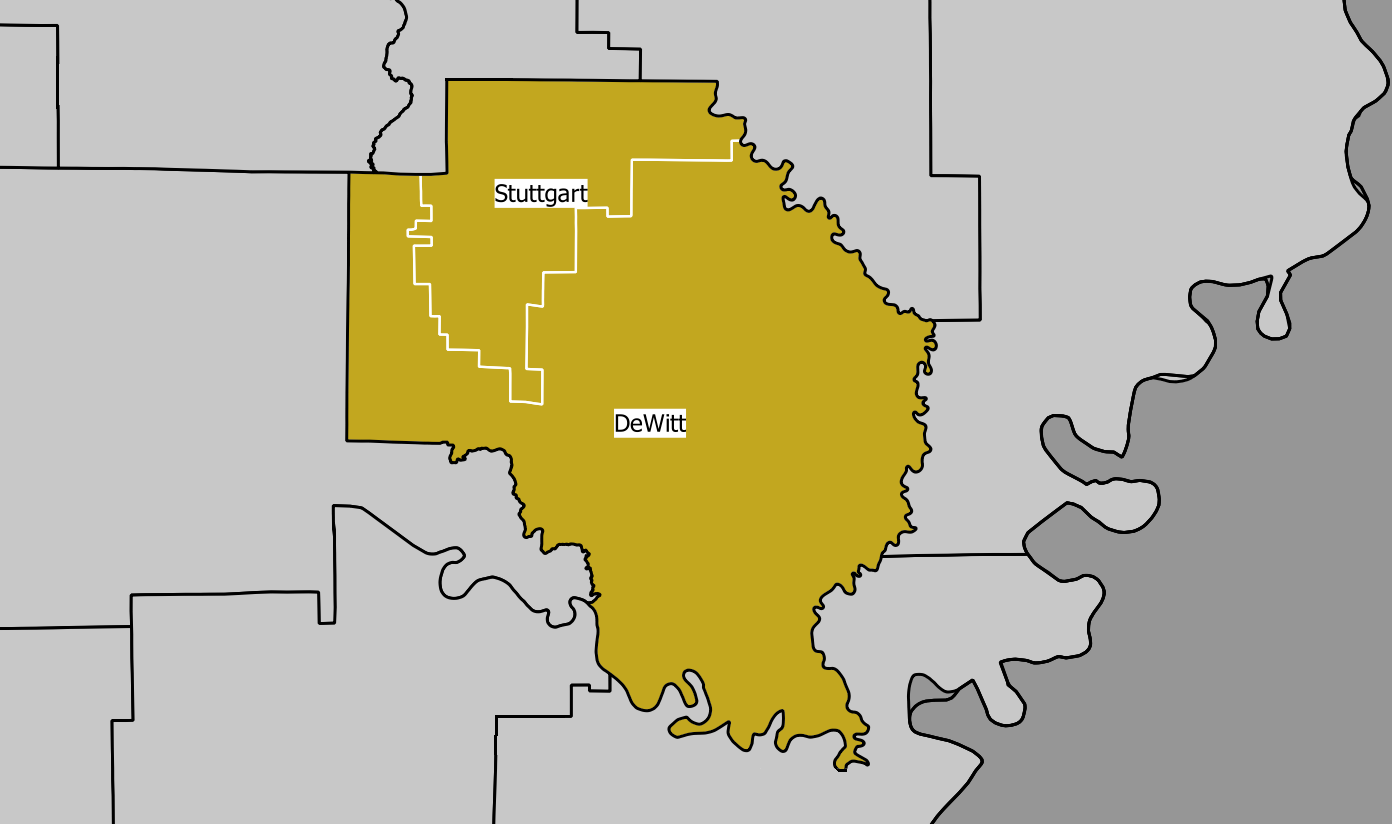
Public school district boundaries in Arkansas County as of July 2016

Two public school districts are based in Arkansas County: Stuttgart Public Schools is the larger of the two school districts in the county, with the DeWitt School District serving most of the rural area of the county. Successful completion of the curriculum of these schools leads to graduation from Stuttgart High School or DeWitt High School, respectively. Both high schools offer Advanced Placement (AP) courses and are accredited by the Arkansas Department of Education (ADE).

==== Higher education ====
Within Arkansas County, two branch campuses of Phillips Community College (based in Helena-West Helena) are operated in De Witt and Stuttgart. Public four-year colleges in the area include the University of Arkansas at Monticello in Monticello, University of Arkansas at Pine Bluff (UAPB) in Pine Bluff, and several institutions in Little Rock.

==== Library system ====
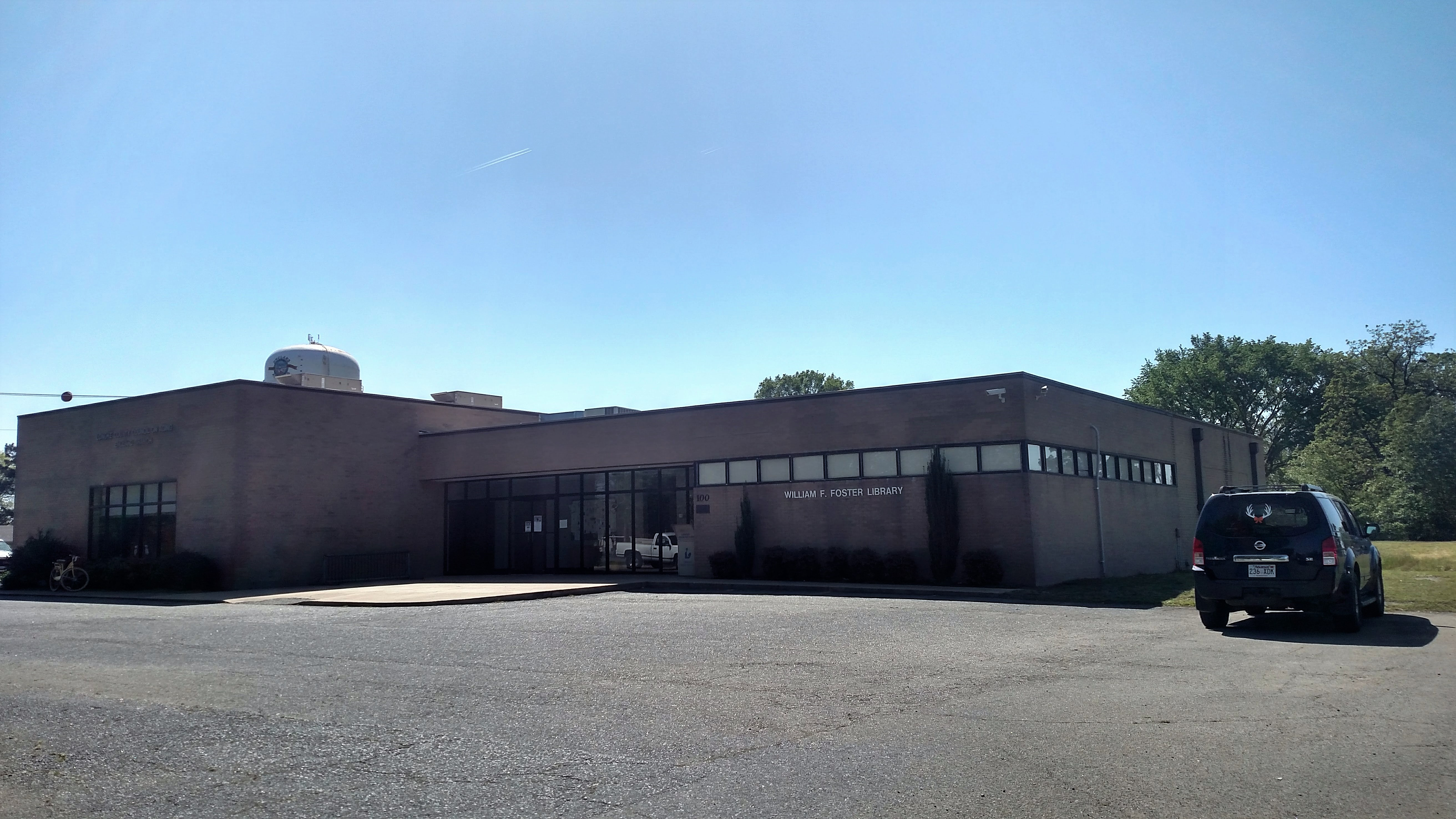
William F. Foster Library in Stuttgart

The Arkansas County Library system is based in Stuttgart and contains three branches: Cleon Collier Memorial Library, DeWitt Public Library, and the William F. Foster Stuttgart Public Library. All three offer books, e-books, media, reference, youth, business and genealogy services.

=== Public health ===
Arkansas County's above-average poverty rate indicates a high Medicaid eligibility rate. As of 2012, 31.8% of Arkansas County was eligible for Medicaid, with 72.5% of children under 19 eligible for ARKids First, a program by the Arkansas Department of Human Services that combines children's Medicaid (ARKids A) and other programs for families with higher incomes (ARKids B). The county's population is significantly above healthy weight, with 71.2% of adults and 39.8% of children/adolescents ranking as overweight or obese, compared to the state averages of 67.1% and 39.3%, respectively. These rates are significantly above national averages of 62.9% and 30.3%, respectively.

The Baptist Health hospital system operates the Baptist Health Medical Center-Stuttgart in the city, the only community hospital in Arkansas County. It is rated as a Level 4 Trauma Center by the Arkansas Department of Health. The DeWitt Hospital & Nursing Home is a critical access hospital, which maintains 25 beds, a 60-bed nursing home, and the Ferguson Rural Health Clinic. Both are members of the Arkansas Rural Health Partnership. Jefferson Regional Medical Center in Pine Bluff is a referral hospital in the region.

The nearest Level 1 Trauma Centers are University of Arkansas for Medical Sciences (UAMS) and Arkansas Children's Hospital (ACH) in Little Rock.

=== Public safety ===
The Arkansas County Sheriff's Office is the primary law enforcement agency in the county. The agency is led by the Arkansas County Sheriff, an official elected by countywide vote every four years. Police departments in Stuttgart, DeWitt, Humphrey, Gillett, and Almyra provide law enforcement in their respective jurisdictions, with St. Charles contracting with the Arkansas County Sheriff's Office for law enforcement services.

The county is under the jurisdiction of two separate district courts, both local district courts of original jurisdiction for criminal, civil, small claims, and traffic matters. Local district courts are presided over by an elected part-time judge who may privately practice law. Arkansas County Northern District Court is held in Stuttgart. Arkansas County Southern District Court has departments in DeWitt, Gillett, and St. Charles.

Superseding district court jurisdiction is the 11th East Judicial Circuit Court, which covers all of Arkansas County. The 11th East Circuit contains one judge elected to a six-year term.

Fire protection, prevention and suppression is provided by eleven agencies in Arkansas County, together covering the entire county. The six incorporated municipalities each provide fire protection, in some cases extending beyond corporate limits. Rural areas are served by the Alcorn, Casscoe, Crockett's Bluff, One Horse, and Tichnor volunteer fire departments. All fire departments in Arkansas County are volunteer-based, except the Stuttgart Fire Department.

== Culture and contemporary life ==
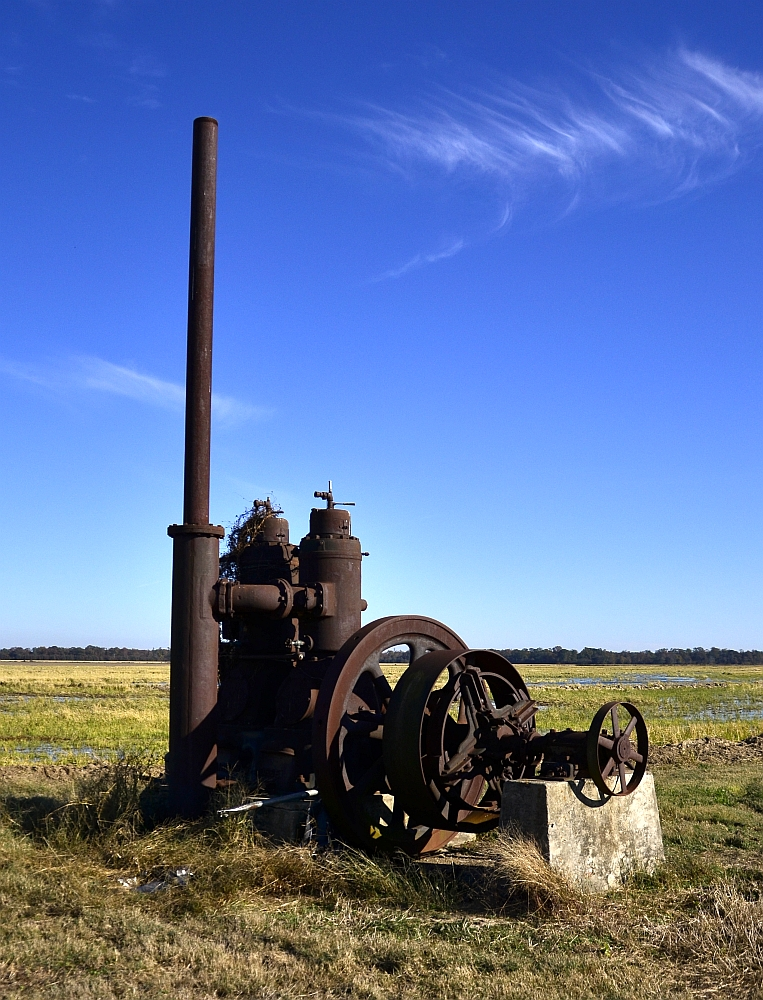
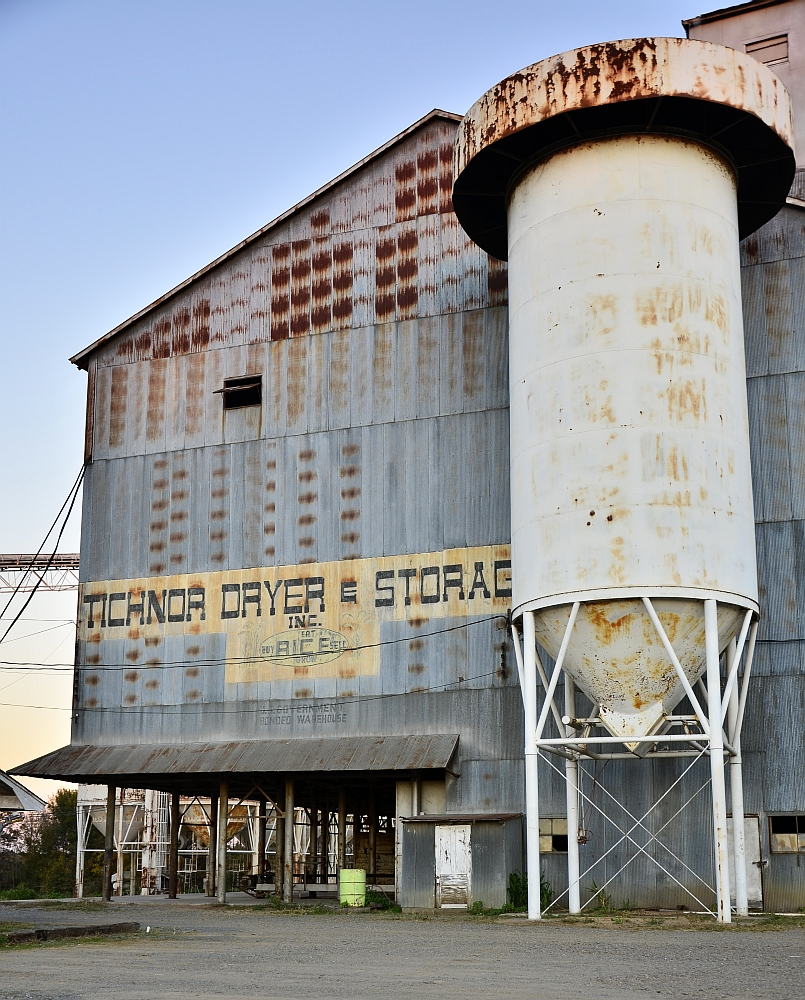
Several properties related to Arkansas County's rice heritage are listed on the NRHP, including the A.M. Bohnert Rice Plantation Pump (left) and the Tichnor Rice Dryer and Storage Building (right).

Arkansas County has several facilities, monuments, and museums dedicated to preserving the history and culture of the area. Several historic log structures remain in the county from the pioneer era. Four facilities interpret the county's natural heritage and unique position on the Grand Prairie, including Arkansas Post State Park, the Museum of the Grand Prairie in Stuttgart, the Potlatch Conservation Education Center in Casscoe, and the Visitor Center at White River NWR in St. Charles. Local history museums include the St. Charles Museum and the Museum of the Grand Prairie in Stuttgart.

Several National Register of Historic Places (NRHP, complete county list) properties in the county relate to Arkansas County's rice heritage, including the A.M. Bohnert Rice Plantation Pump, L.A. Black Rice Milling Association Inc. Office, Tichnor Rice Dryer and Storage Building, and several contributing structures from the DeWitt Commercial Historic District and Stuttgart Commercial Historic District. Several buildings in these districts also were parts of the county's economic and cultural history, including the Riceland Hotel and Standard Ice Company Building in downtown Stuttgart. History of government and public services in the county is preserved in both the Northern District and Southern District courthouses, DeWitt Post Office and Stuttgart Post Office, and the Old Gillett Jail.

Arkansas County hosts two farmer's markets, offering fresh produce, baked goods and crafts: North Market at Main and Sixth streets in Stuttgart and South Market on Highway 165 in DeWitt. Both are open from May through October.

=== Annual cultural events ===
The most widely known annual cultural event in Arkansas County is the Gillett Coon Supper, described by The Wall Street Journal as "a political rite of passage" for those seeking public office in Arkansas. The meeting of local residents and politicians started in 1943 as a fundraiser serving boiled, and smoked raccoon for the Gillet High School football team, but has remained a tradition long after the school's consolidation.

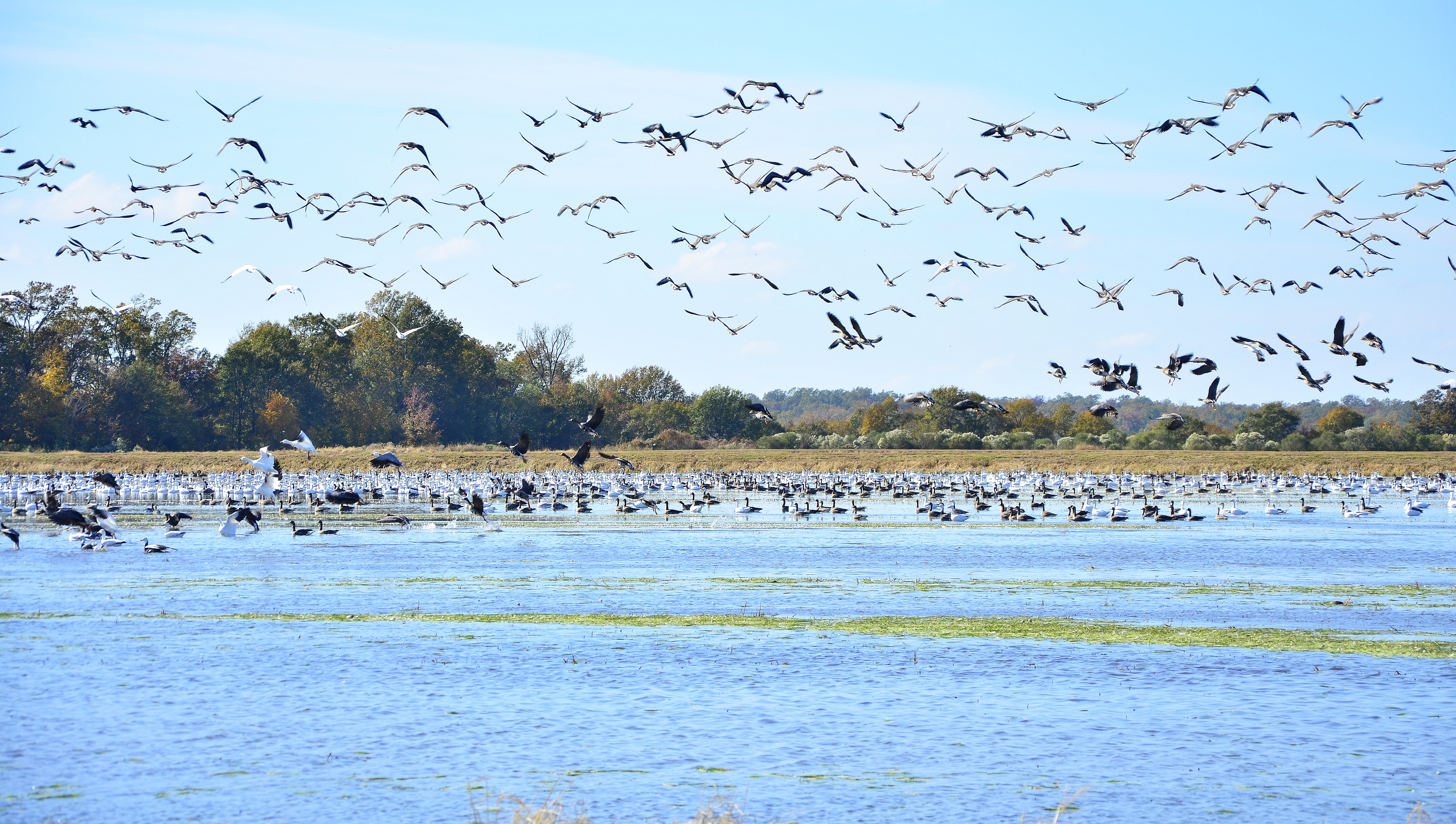
Waterfowl near Bayou Meto

Perhaps the most popular annual event is duck hunting season between November and January, a tradition dating back to the Illinois Indians who traveled south to Arkansas to hunt. Popular with Arkansans and tourist hunters from across the country, annual hunting trips in Arkansas were first documented by French explorers Jacques Marquette and Louis Jolliet in 1673. Many hunts are organized through hunting clubs (like the historic Crocketts Bluff Hunting Lodge) and usually involve local guides for tourist groups. Public lands are very desirable and fill up quickly; many Arkansans seek to use private lands in Arkansas County to avoid crowds. In the 2016–17 season, the AGFC sold over 100,000 waterfowl stamps, roughly equally split between in-state and out-of-state hunters. The numbers include over 8,000 to out-of-state hunters to hunt on WMAs. Festivities begin during Thanksgiving Week with the World's Championship Duck Calling Contest and Wings Over the Prairie Festival in Stuttgart.

The Arkansas County Fair has been held annually since 1938 at the Arkansas County Fairgrounds in DeWitt during mid-September.

=== Media ===
The county newspaper is the Stuttgart Daily Leader, a daily newspaper established in Stuttgart in 1885. Former newspapers include The Free Press and The Stuttgart Republican.

== Government ==
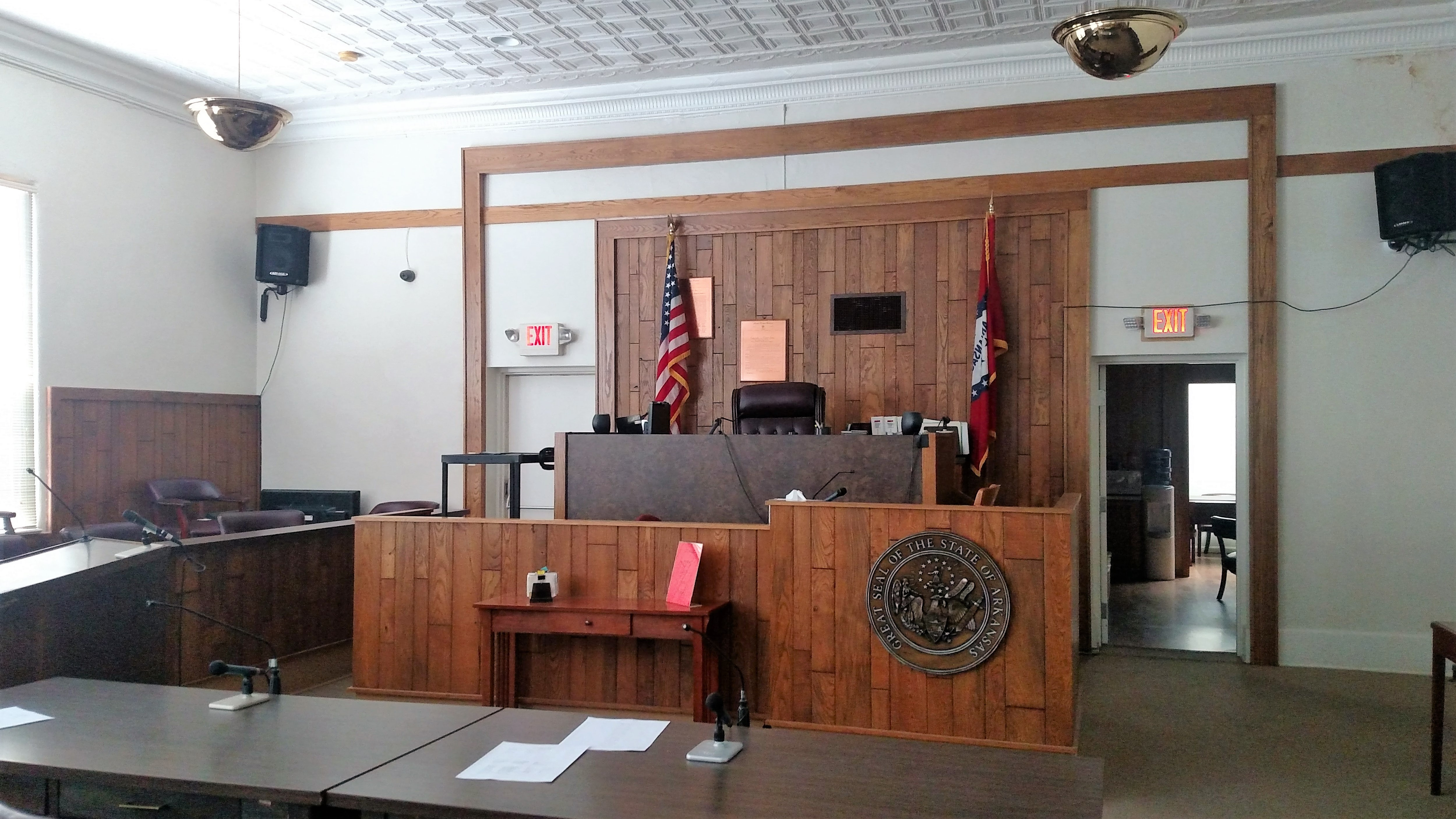
Courtroom in the Northern District Courthouse in Stuttgart

The county government is a constitutional body granted specific powers by the Constitution of Arkansas and the Arkansas Code. The quorum court is the legislative branch of the county government and controls all spending and revenue collection. Representatives are called justices of the peace and are elected from county districts every even-numbered year. The number of districts in a county vary from nine to fifteen, and district boundaries are drawn by the county election commission. The Arkansas County Quorum Court has nine members. Presiding over quorum court meetings is the county judge, who serves as the chief operating officer of the county. The county judge is elected at-large and does not vote in quorum court business, although capable of vetoing quorum court decisions.

Arkansas County, Arkansas elected countywide officials
Position	Officeholder	Party
County judge	Thomas Best	Republican
County Clerk	Melissa Wood	Republican
Circuit clerk	Sarah Merchant	Republican
Sheriff/collector	Johnny Cheek	Republican
Treasurer	Ruby Dillion	Republican
Assessor	Marcia I. Theis	Republican
Coroner	Laura Essex	Independent

The Quorum Court following the 2024 elections consists of seven Republicans, one Democrat, and one Independent. Justices of the peace (members) of the Quorum Court following the elections are:

- District 1: Eddie Roberson (R)
- District 2: Clay Carter (R)
- District 3: Derek Swain Menard (R)
- District 4: Charles Wright (R)
- District 5: Robert Lee Henderson (R)
- District 6: Inez L. McLemore (D)
- District 7: Michelle Blasengame (I)
- District 8: Lloyd Brosius (R)
- District 9: Curtis Ahrens (R)

Additionally, the townships of Arkansas County are entitled to elect their own respective constables, as set forth by the Constitution of Arkansas. Constables are largely of historical significance, as they were used to keep the peace in rural areas when travel was more difficult. The township constables as of the 2024 elections are:

- Lagrue: Jack L. Lock (R)
- McFall: Joe Maier (R)

=== Taxation ===
Property tax is assessed by the Arkansas County Assessor annually, based on the fair market value of the property and determining which tax rate, commonly called a millage in Arkansas, will apply. The rate depends upon the property's location with respect to city limits, school district, and special tax increment financing (TIF) districts. This tax is collected by the Arkansas County Collector between the first business day of March of each year through October 15 without penalty. The Arkansas County Treasurer disburses tax revenues to various government agencies, such as cities, county road departments, fire departments, libraries, and police departments in accordance with the budget set by the quorum court.

Sales and use taxes in Arkansas are voter approved and collected by the Arkansas Department of Finance and Administration. Arkansas's statewide sales and use tax has been 6.5% since July 1, 2013. Arkansas County has an additional sales and use tax of 1.0%, which has been in effect since January 1, 1998. Within Arkansas County, Almyra and Humphrey have an additional tax of 1.0%, St. Charles has an additional 2.0%, Gillett and Stuttgart an additional 3.0%, and DeWitt an additional 3.5% on top of county rates. The Arkansas State Treasurer disburses tax revenue to counties/cities in accordance with tax rules.

== Politics ==
Until the 1952 presidential election, Arkansas County was reliably Democratic, having only voted for a Republican once when Warren G. Harding narrowly won it in 1920. In 1952, the county voted for Republican Dwight D. Eisenhower and continued to swing between Republicans and Democrats through the rest of the 20th century, with the exception of southerner George Wallace's third party bid in 1968. Over the past few election cycles, Arkansas County has trended heavily towards the Republican Party. The last Democrat to carry the county was Arkansas native Bill Clinton in 1996.

United States presidential election results for Arkansas County, Arkansas
Year	Republican		Democratic		Third party(ies)	
Year	No.	%	No.	%	No.	%
1896	550	31.57%	1,175	67.45%	17	0.98%
1900	598	37.31%	990	61.76%	15	0.94%
1904	470	36.24%	753	58.06%	74	5.71%
1908	672	40.19%	937	56.04%	63	3.77%
1912	249	16.95%	869	59.16%	351	23.89%
1916	613	35.39%	1,119	64.61%	0	0.00%
1920	1,199	50.23%	1,156	48.43%	32	1.34%
1924	488	36.15%	772	57.19%	90	6.67%
1928	1,046	41.10%	1,491	58.59%	8	0.31%
1932	494	14.55%	2,867	84.45%	34	1.00%
1936	341	14.47%	2,008	85.19%	8	0.34%
1940	742	23.69%	2,345	74.87%	45	1.44%
1944	1,031	37.48%	1,711	62.20%	9	0.33%
1948	737	21.96%	1,781	53.07%	838	24.97%
1952	2,697	50.34%	2,648	49.42%	13	0.24%
1956	2,826	50.15%	2,736	48.55%	73	1.30%
1960	2,043	38.42%	2,789	52.44%	486	9.14%
1964	3,769	53.92%	3,200	45.78%	21	0.30%
1968	1,806	23.76%	2,019	26.57%	3,775	49.67%
1972	5,225	73.46%	1,849	25.99%	39	0.55%
1976	2,480	30.54%	5,640	69.46%	0	0.00%
1980	3,409	42.69%	4,303	53.89%	273	3.42%
1984	4,804	59.99%	3,153	39.37%	51	0.64%
1988	4,007	55.61%	3,075	42.68%	123	1.71%
1992	2,594	32.51%	4,709	59.01%	677	8.48%
1996	1,910	28.52%	4,220	63.00%	568	8.48%
2000	3,353	52.62%	2,877	45.15%	142	2.23%
2004	3,789	54.55%	3,110	44.77%	47	0.68%
2008	4,185	59.97%	2,619	37.53%	174	2.49%
2012	3,897	60.01%	2,455	37.80%	142	2.19%
2016	3,826	61.59%	1,939	31.21%	447	7.20%
2020	4,304	68.40%	1,818	28.89%	170	2.70%
2024	3,951	71.23%	1,503	27.10%	93	1.68%

== Communities ==
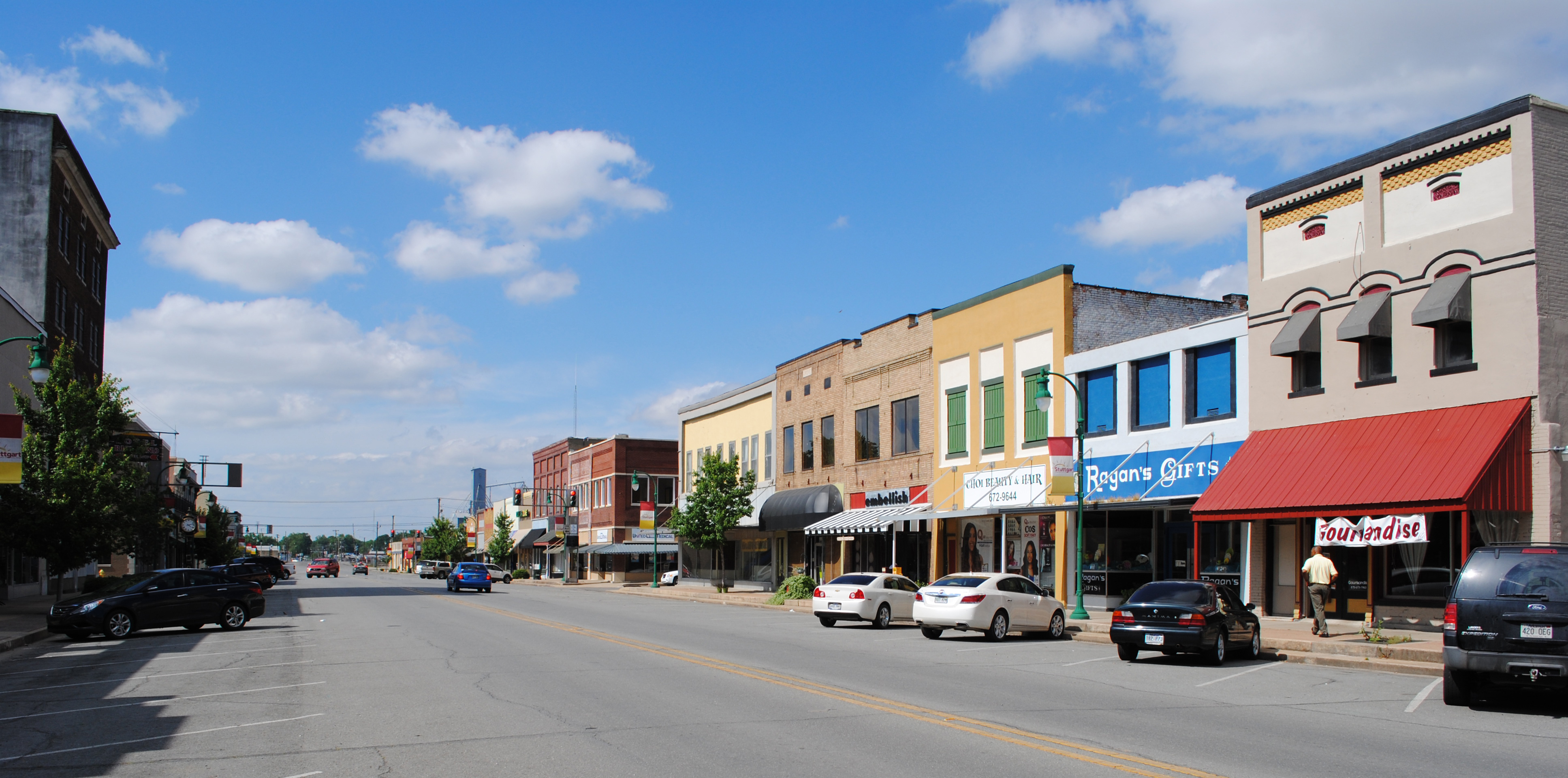
Streetside in Stuttgart

Four incorporated cities and two incorporated towns are located within the county. Each has seen steady population decline over recent decades. The largest city and northern district county seat, Stuttgart, is located in the north part of the county near the Prairie County line. Stuttgart's population in 2010 was 9,326, and has been declining steadily since a peak of 10,941 at the 1980 Census. DeWitt, centrally located in Arkansas County, is the southern district county seat and second-largest city in the county with a population of 3,292 in 2010. The remaining communities each have populations under 750 as of 2010; Humphrey is partially located in Jefferson County on Arkansas County's western edge, St. Charles is on the White River in the eastern portion of the county, and Gillett in southern Arkansas County. Almyra is located along Highway 130 between DeWitt and Stuttgart.

=== Cities ===
- DeWitt (county seat)
- Gillett
- Humphrey (partly in Jefferson County)
- Stuttgart (county seat)

=== Towns ===
- Almyra
- St. Charles

=== Unincorporated communities ===
Arkansas County has dozens of unincorporated communities and ghost towns within its borders. This is due to early settlers in Arkansas tending to settle in small clusters rather than incorporated towns. For example, communities like Ethel have a post office or central density of buildings at some point in their history. Other communities are simply a few dwellings at a crossroads that have adopted a common place name over time. Some are officially listed as populated places by the United States Geological Survey, and others are listed as historic settlements.

- Arkansas Post
- Bayou Meto
- Benzal
- Burks
- Casscoe
- Crocketts Bluff
- Deluce
- Ethel
- Goldman
- Hagler
- Holdridge
- Hortons Landing
- Hyden
- Immanuel
- Jacks Bay Landing
- Kittlers
- La Grue Springs
- LaGrue
- Lodge Corner
- Lookout
- Mayview
- Medina
- Mount Adams
- Nady
- North Stuttgart
- Olena
- Plainview
- Prairie Landing
- Prairie Union
- Preston Ferry
- Ricusky
- Sheppard Point
- South Stuttgart
- Tichnor
- Vallier
- Van
- Weber
- Yoder

==== Historical communities ====
- Abeles
- Arkansas
- Buffo
- Fish Dock
- Monica
- Ona
- Osotouy
- Parham
- Roberts
- Sassafras
- Super
- Thomwall
- West Bayou

=== Townships ===
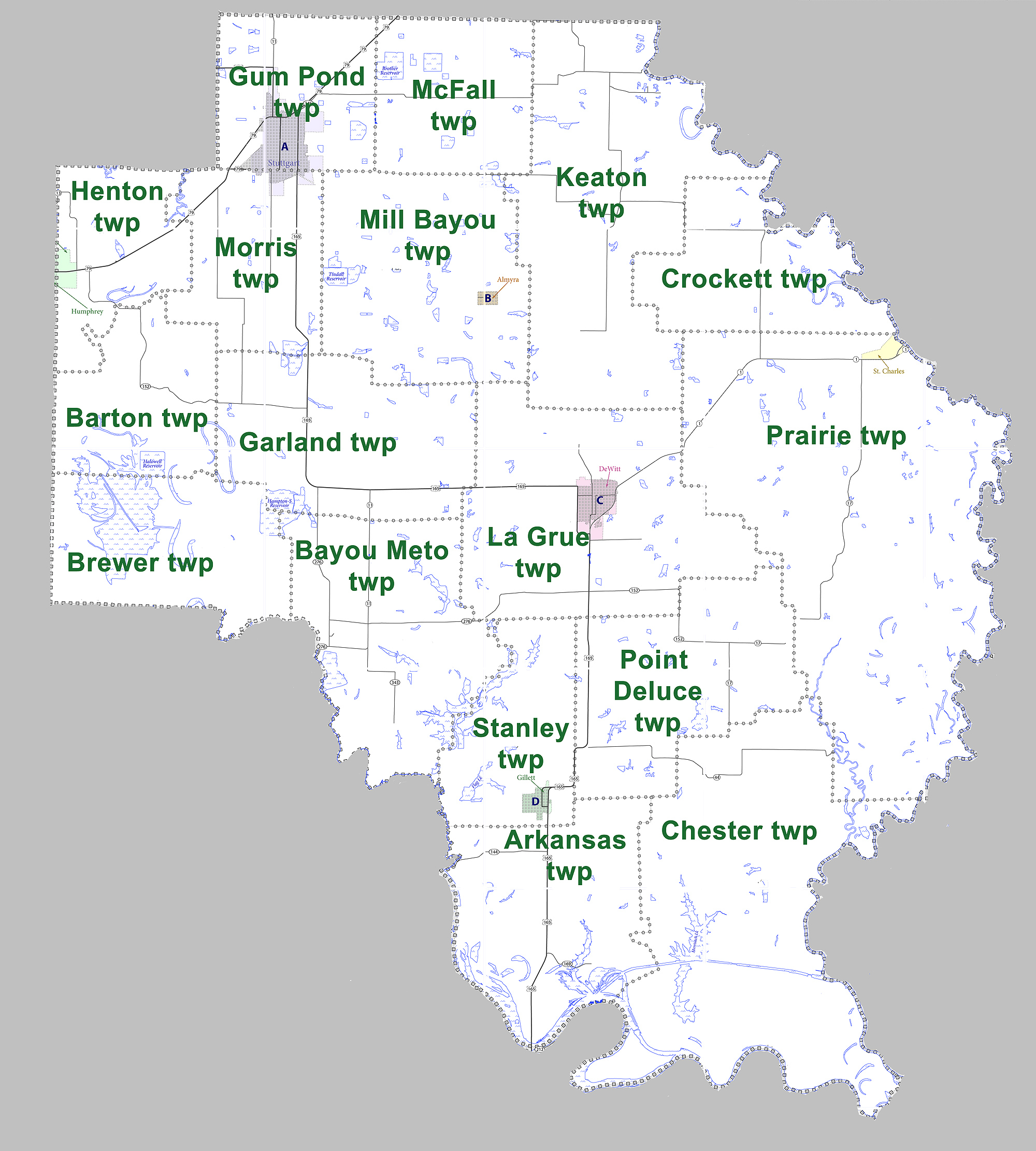
Townships in Arkansas County, Arkansas as of 2010

Townships in Arkansas are the divisions of a county. Each township includes unincorporated areas; some may have incorporated cities or towns within part of their boundaries. Arkansas townships have limited purposes in modern times. However, the United States census does list Arkansas population based on townships (sometimes referred to as "county subdivisions" or "minor civil divisions"). Townships are also of value for historical purposes in terms of genealogical research. Each town or city is within one or more townships in an Arkansas county based on census maps and publications. The townships of Arkansas County are listed below; listed in parentheses are the cities, towns, and/or census-designated places that are fully or partially inside the township.

- Arkansas (Gillett)
- Barton
- Bayou Meto
- Brewer
- Chester
- Crockett
- Garland
- Gum Pond (most of Stuttgart)
- Henton (Humphrey)
- Keaton
- La Grue (De Witt)
- McFall
- Mill Bayou (Almyra)
- Morris (part of Stuttgart)
- Point Deluce
- Prairie (St. Charles)
- Stanley

== Infrastructure ==
=== Aviation ===
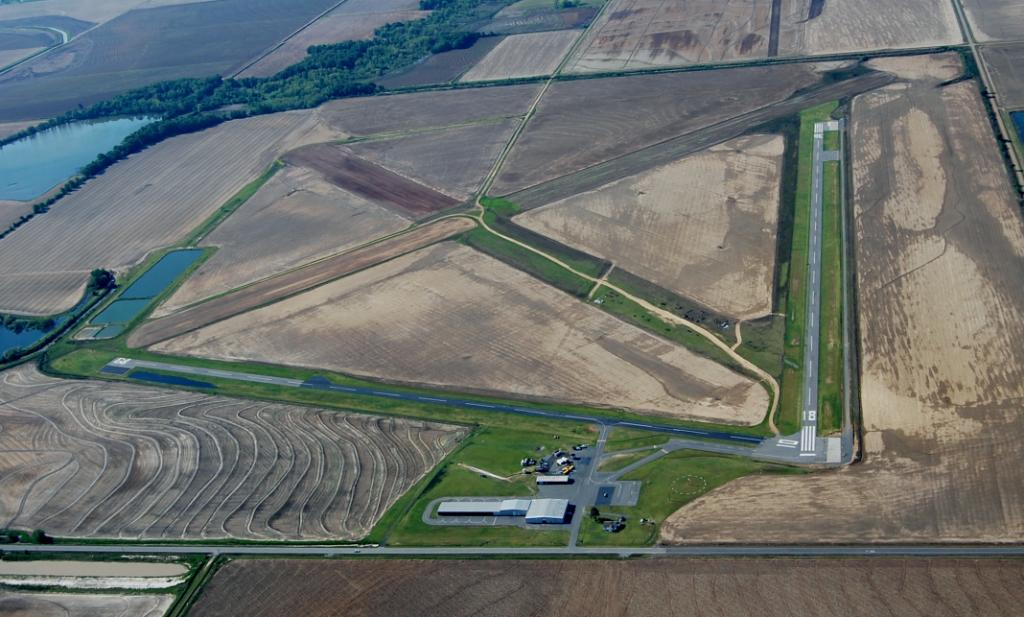
Almyra Municipal Airport

The county contains two public owned/public use airports: Almyra Municipal Airport and DeWitt Municipal Airport. Both are small, rural airports with over 50,000 annual operations, almost entirely agricultural spraying operations. Stuttgart Municipal Airport is located north of the city, in Prairie County. Arkansas County also contains 16 private airfields.

=== Major highways ===
- US Route 63
- US Route 79
- US Route 165
- Highway 1
- Highway 11
- Highway 13
- Highway 17
- Highway 33
- Highway 44
- Highway 130
- Highway 144
- Highway 146
- Highway 152
- Highway 153
- Highway 169
- Highway 276
- Highway 343
- Highway 980

== Notable people ==
- Antoine Barraqué (1773–1858), founder of New Gascony, Arkansas
