= DeWitt High School (Arkansas) =

Location
- 1614 South Grandview Drive; DeWitt, Arkansas 72042-1826; United States; 34°16′42″N 91°21′1″W

Information
- School type: Public comprehensive
- Status: Open
- School district: DeWitt School District
- CEEB code: 040635
- NCES School ID: 050000100216
- Teaching staff: 33.08 (on FTE basis)
- Grades: 9–12
- Enrollment: 350 (2023-2024)
- Student to teacher ratio: 10.58
- Education system: ADE Smart Core
- Classes offered: Regular, Advanced Placement (AP)
- Colors: Blue and gold
- Athletics conference: 3A East
- Mascot: Dragon
- Team name: DeWitt Dragons
- Accreditation: ADE
- Communities served: DeWitt, Almyra, Gillett, Humphrey, Saint Charles, and Nady
- Website: www.dewittdragons.net/o/dhs

DeWitt High School is a comprehensive public high school located in DeWitt, Arkansas, United States. The school provides secondary education for students in grades 9 through 12. DeWitt is one of two public high schools in Arkansas County, Arkansas and the sole high school administered by the DeWitt School District.

== History ==
In 2009 Gillett High School closed, and students were consolidated into DeWitt High.

== Service area ==
Its territory includes areas in Arkansas, Jefferson, and Desha counties.

The municipalities it serves include DeWitt, Almyra, Gillett, Saint Charles, and Humphrey.

Additionally the district includes unincorporated areas: Arkansas Post, Bayou Meto, Crocketts Bluff, Eldridge Corner, Ethel, Nady, One Horse Store, Point Deluce, Reydell, Stinking Bay, and Tichnor.

== Academics ==
DeWitt High School is accredited by the Arkansas Department of Education (ADE) and the assumed course of study follows the Smart Core curriculum developed by the ADE, which requires students complete at least 22 units prior to graduation. Students complete regular coursework and exams and may take Advanced Placement (AP) courses and exam with the opportunity to receive college credit.

== Athletics ==
The DeWitt High School mascot and athletic emblem is the dragon with blue and gold serving as the school colors.

The DeWitt compete in interscholastic activities within the 4A Classification via the 4A Region 8 Conference, as administered by the Arkansas Activities Association. The Dragons field teams in football, golf (boys/girls), basketball (boys/girls), cheer, bowling (boys/girls), cross country (boys/girls), track and field (boys/girls), baseball, and fastpitch softball.

== Famous alumni ==
Harold Horton (Nov 14, 1939 – May 3, 2025) played football for DeWitt High School and received all-state honors for the Dewitt Dragons in 1956. He went on to play for the University of Arkansas from 1959 to 1961. He eventually became the head football coach at the University of Central Arkansas (UCA) from 1982 to 1989.
