= Nady, Arkansas =

Unincorporated community in Arkansas, US

Nady is an unincorporated community in Arkansas County, Arkansas, United States. It is the location of a National Historic Landmark, the Menard–Hodges site. The environs of Nady, at the southern tip of the Little Prairie, are in the portion of Arkansas that saw the earliest European settlement in what is now the state of Arkansas, including Tonty’s 1686 post. The Menard-Hodges archeological site, about one-half mile southwest of Wallace-Menard-Coose Cemetery, along with the adjacent Wallace Bottom archeological site, appear to be the locations of the late 1600s Quapaw village of Osotouy, Tonty’s 1686 Post, and the early to mid-1700s French Arkansas Post.

The Geographic Names Information System (GNIS) provides the location of the Nady Church at: 33°59′50″N 91°15′00″W. GNIS also lists the Nady Post Office (historical) and Sweeney's store at an unknown location.

Residents are zoned to the DeWitt School District, including DeWitt High School.

== See also ==
- List of National Historic Landmarks in Arkansas
