= Pansy, Arkansas =

Unincorporated community in Arkansas, US

Coordinates: 33°49′19″N 92°00′10″W

Pansy is an unincorporated community in Cleveland County, Arkansas, United States.
