= Lodge Corner, Arkansas =

- Unincorporated community
- Lodge Corner's position in Arkansas. Lodge Corner, Arkansas (the United States)
- Coordinates: 34°18′00″N 91°31′30″W
- Country: United States
- State: Arkansas
- County: Arkansas
- Elevation: 190 ft (58 m)
- Time zone: UTC-6 (Central (CST))
  - Summer (DST): UTC-5 (CDT)
- GNIS feature ID: 51382

Lodge Corner (also Lodge or Lodges Corner prior to 1950) is an unincorporated community in Arkansas County, Arkansas, United States. The community is located where Arkansas Highway 276 begins at U.S. Route 165.

== Education ==
Residents are in the Stuttgart School District. It operates Stuttgart High School.
