= Reydell, Arkansas =

- Unincorporated community
- Location within Arkansas Location within the United States
- Coordinates: 34°09′26″N 91°34′03″W
- Country: United States
- State: Arkansas
- County: Jefferson
- Elevation: 180 ft (55 m)
- Time zone: UTC-6 (Central (CST))
  - Summer (DST): UTC-5 (CDT)
- ZIP code: 72133
- Area code: 870
- GNIS feature ID: 53994

Reydell or Reydel is an unincorporated community in Jefferson County, Arkansas, United States. Reydell is located at the junction of Arkansas Highway 11 and Arkansas Highway 88, 16 miles (26 km) southwest of De Witt. Reydell has a post office with ZIP code 72133.

Reydell is in the DeWitt School District. The community was already in the DeWitt district by the early 1950s. This district operates DeWitt High School.
