= Old Gillett Jail =

- U.S. National Register of Historic Places
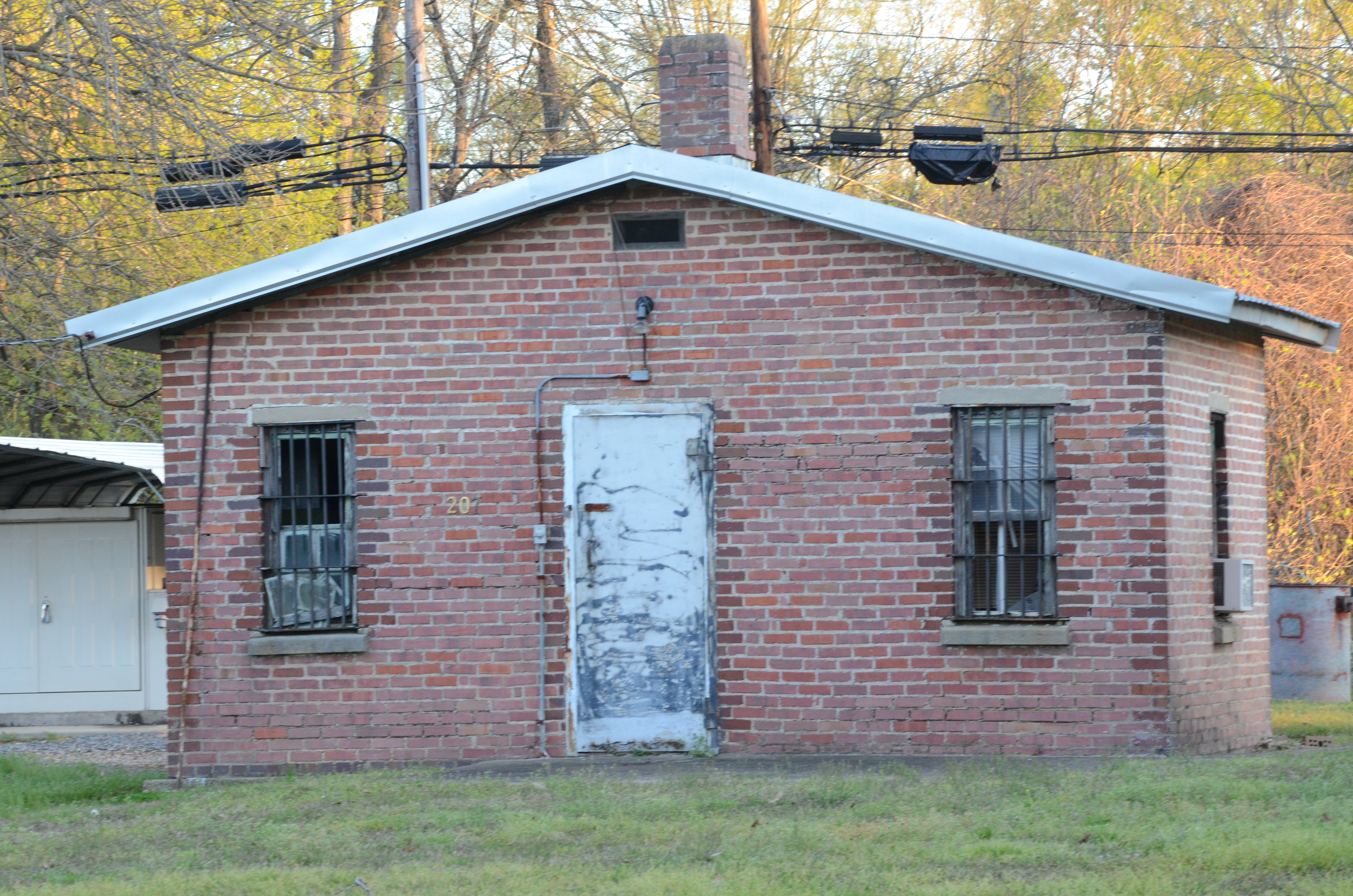

- Location within Arkansas Location within the United States
- Location: 207 Main St., Gillett, Arkansas
- Coordinates: 34°7′9″N 91°22′45″W
- Area: less than one acre
- Built: 1922
- NRHP reference No.: 07000440
- Added to NRHP: May 22, 2007

The Old Gillett Jail is a historic former city jail at 207 Main Street in Gillett, Arkansas. It is a single-story brick structure, housing two cells and a small entry vestibule. Its windows have vertical iron bars over them, and the door is made of solid metal. The roof is made of metal. It was built in 1922, and served as the city jail until about 1972.

The building was listed on the National Register of Historic Places in 2007.

== See also ==
- National Register of Historic Places listings in Arkansas County, Arkansas
