= Bayou Meto, Arkansas County, Arkansas =

Bayou Meto, Arkansas
- Unincorporated community
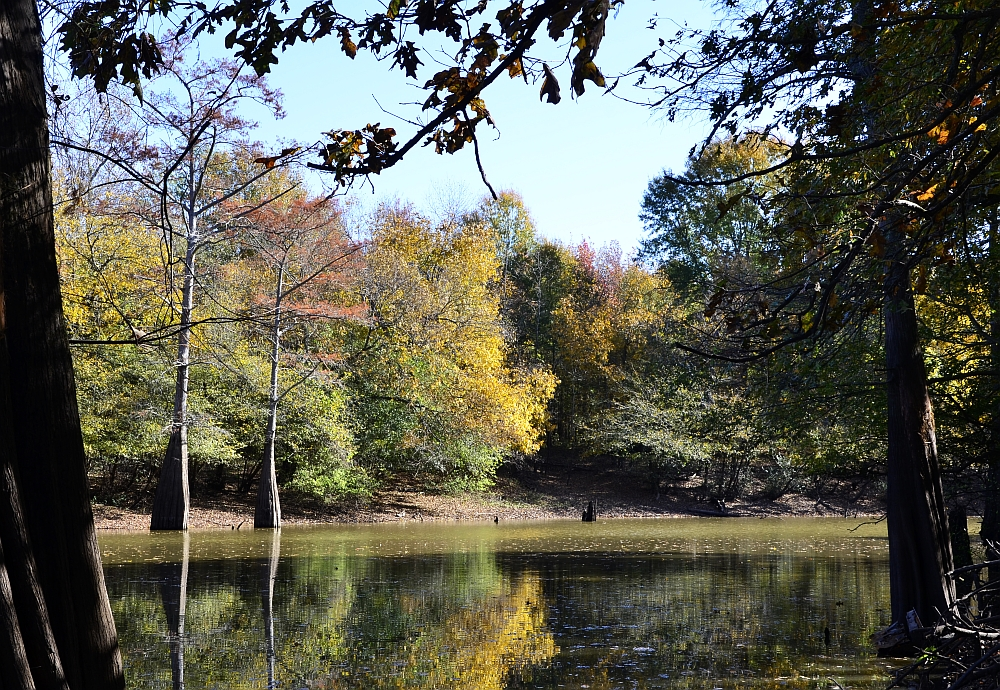
- Bayou Meto

- Bayou Meto's position in Arkansas. Bayou Meto, Arkansas (the United States)
- Coordinates: 34°13′25″N 91°31′16″W
- Country: United States
- State: Arkansas
- County: Arkansas
- Elevation: 187 ft (57 m)
- Time zone: UTC-6 (Central (CST))
  - Summer (DST): UTC-5 (CDT)
- GNIS feature ID: 76257

Bayou Meto (also Bayou Metoe) is an unincorporated community in Arkansas County, Arkansas, United States. The community is located where Arkansas Highway 276S diverges from Arkansas Highway 276.

Residents are in the DeWitt School District. It operates DeWitt High School.
