= Arkansas Highway 17 =

Highway in Arkansas

Highway 17

Route information
- Maintained by ArDOT
- Existed: 1926–present

Section 1
- Length: 4.9 mi (7.9 km)
- South end: Billy Cotten Lane near Ward Reservoir
- North end: La Grue Bayou

Section 2
- Length: 11.4 mi (18.3 km)
- South end: Morgan Loop Road near Ethel
- North end: AR 1 in St. Charles

Section 3
- Length: 21.8 mi (35.1 km)
- South end: AR 1 at Cross Roads
- North end: US 79 at Park Grove

Section 4
- Length: 10.6 mi (17.1 km)
- South end: US 79 near Clarendon
- North end: US 70 near Brinkley

Section 5
- Length: 55.7 mi (89.6 km)
- South end: US 49 in Brinkley
- Major intersections: US 64 from Patterson to McCrory; I-57 / US 67 in Newport
- North end: AR 14 in Newport

Section 6
- Length: 9.4 mi (15.1 km)
- South end: AR 18 in Diaz
- North end: AR 37 near Tuckerman

Location
- Country: United States
- State: Arkansas
- Counties: Arkansas, Monroe, Woodruff, Jackson

Highway system
- Arkansas Highway System; Interstate; US; State; Business; Spurs; Suffixed; Scenic; Heritage
| ← AR 16 | → AR 18 |

Arkansas Highway 17 (AR 17) is a designation for six state highways in east Arkansas. One segment of 4.9 miles (7.9 km) begins east of the Ward Reservoir and runs north to the La Grue Bayou. A second segment of 11.4 miles (18.3 km) runs from Morgan Loop Road south of Ethel north to Highway 1 at St. Charles. A third segment of 21.8 miles (35.1 km) runs from Highway 1 at Cross Roads north to U.S. Route 79 (US 79) at Park Grove. A fourth segment of 10.6 miles (17.1 km) runs from US 79 east of Clarendon north to US 70 southwest of Brinkley. A fifth segment of 55.7 miles (89.6 km) runs from US 49 in Brinkley north to Highway 14 in Newport. A sixth segment of 9.4 miles (15.1 km) runs from Highway 18 in Diaz northwest to Highway 37 west of Tuckerman.

== Route description ==
=== Ward Reservoir to La Grue Bayou ===
Highway 17 begins east of the Ward Reservoir as a continuation of Billy Cotten Lane and runs north, until reaching a three-way intersection with Highway 152 at DeLuce. From there, the route starts to head east and ends at the La Grue Bayou, about 1.8 miles (2.9 km) east of the intersection.

=== Ethel to St. Charles ===
The route begins at Morgan Loop Road south of Ethel and runs north for about 11.4 miles (18.3 km) until it reaches the intersection of Highway 1 in St. Charles, where it terminates.

=== Cross Roads to Park Grove ===
The route begins at Highway 1 at Cross Roads and runs north, before sharing a concurrency with Highway 86 in Holly Grove. About 6 miles (9.7 km) north of Holly Grove, Highway 17 comes to another three-way intersection with US 79 at Park Grove, where it terminates.

=== Clarendon to Brinkley ===
The route begins at US 79 east of Clarendon and runs north, intersecting Highway 241 at Keevil and Highway 302 right before the route's northern terminus at US 70 southwest of Brinkley.

=== Brinkley to Newport ===
The route begins at US 49 in Brinkley, just north of Interstate 40 (I-40). Highway 17 heads north for about 8.4 miles (13.5 km) before intersecting Highway 38 in Cotton Plant. Between Brinkley and Cotton Plant, the route is designated as the "Sister Rosetta Tharpe Memorial Highway". Both routes share a concurrency heading east for about 1.7 miles (2.7 km) before heading north again. From there, Highway 17 continues to head north, intersecting Highway 306 north of Cotton Plant, and Highway 260 south of Patterson. The route will come to another three-way intersection with US 64 in Patterson, and will share a concurrency with US 64 for about 2 miles (3.2 km) until turning north in McCrory at the intersection of US 64 and Highway 145. The route continues towards Newport, intersecting Highway 37 north of McCrory, and Highway 33 sharing a concurrency near Tupelo, as well as the towns of Weldon and Auvergne. Highway 17 intersects Highway 14 at Erwin before an interchange with I-57/US 67/US 167 in Newport, and terminates at Highway 14 shortly after.

=== Diaz to Tuckerman ===
The route begins at Highway 18 in Diaz and runs north for about a mile before intersecting Highway 157. Highway 17 then runs west for about 1.3 miles (2.1 km) before intersecting Highway 18 east of Jacksonport. The route then runs north for about 7.1 miles (11.4 km) before intersecting Highway 37 west of Tuckerman, where it terminates. The route intersects Highway 226 just south of the northern terminus.

== Major intersections ==
| County | Location | mi | km | Destinations | Notes |
|---|---|---|---|---|---|
| Arkansas | | 0.0 | 0.0 | Billy Cotten Lane | Continuation south |
| Arkansas | DeLuce | 3.2 | 5.1 | AR 152 west – DeWitt | Eastern terminus of AR 152 |
| Arkansas | | 4.9 | 7.9 | La Grue Bayou | Northern terminus |
| Arkansas | Gap in route | | | | |
| Arkansas | | 0.0 | 0.0 | Morgan Loop Road | Southern terminus |
| Arkansas | | 8.4 | 13.5 | AR 153 north – Van, DeWitt | Southern terminus of AR 153 |
| Arkansas | St. Charles | 11.4 | 18.3 | AR 1 – St. Charles, DeWitt, Marvell | Northern terminus |
Gap in route
| Monroe | Cross Roads | 0.0 | 0.0 | AR 1 – St. Charles, Marvell, Marianna | Southern terminus |
| Monroe | | 8.0 | 12.9 | AR 146 west – Lawrenceville | Eastern terminus of AR 146 |
| Monroe | Holly Grove | 13.3 | 21.4 | AR 146 east – Turner | Western terminus of AR 146 |
| Monroe | Holly Grove | 14.9 | 24.0 | AR 86 west – Clarendon | Southern end of AR 86 concurrency |
| Monroe | Holly Grove | 15.7 | 25.3 | AR 86 east – Marvell | Northern end of AR 86 concurrency |
| Monroe | | 21.8 | 35.1 | US 79 – Clarendon, Stuttgart, Marianna | Northern terminus |
| Monroe | Gap in route | | | | |
| Monroe | | 0.0 | 0.0 | US 79 – Clarendon, Stuttgart, Marianna | Southern terminus |
| Monroe | | 5.4 | 8.7 | AR 241 east | Western terminus of AR 241 |
| Monroe | Keevil | 6.4 | 10.3 | AR 241 west | Eastern terminus of AR 241 |
| Monroe | | 10.2 | 16.4 | AR 302 west – Clarendon | Eastern terminus of AR 302 |
| Monroe | | 10.6 | 17.1 | US 70 – Brinkley, Biscoe, DeValls Bluff | Northern terminus |
| Monroe | Gap in route | | | | |
| Monroe | Brinkley | 0.0 | 0.0 | US 49 – Brinkley, Helena–West Helena, Jonesboro | Southern terminus |
| Woodruff | Cotton Plant | 8.5 | 13.7 | AR 38 west / AR 306 east – Des Arc | Southern end of AR 38 concurrency; western terminus of AR 306 |
| Woodruff | | 10.1 | 16.3 | AR 38 east | Northern end of AR 38 concurrency |
| Woodruff | Four Forks | 14.4 | 23.2 | AR 306 – Cotton Plant, Hunter | |
| Woodruff | Wiville | 20.1 | 32.3 | AR 260 east | Western terminus of AR 260 |
| Woodruff | | 26.3 | 42.3 | AR 260 west | Eastern terminus of AR 260 |
| Woodruff | Patterson | 28.6 | 46.0 | US 64B east | Southern end of US 64B concurrency |
| Woodruff | Patterson | 29.5 | 47.5 | US 64 west – McCrory, Augusta, Bald Knob US 64B ends | Southern end of US 64 concurrency; northern terminus of US 64B |
| Woodruff | McCrory | 31.4 | 50.5 | US 64 east / AR 145 south – McCrory, Wynne, West Memphis | Northern end of US 64 concurrency |
| Woodruff | | 33.4 | 53.8 | AR 37 north – Beedeville, Amagon | Southern terminus of AR 37 |
| Jackson | | 39.3 | 63.2 | AR 33 north | Southern end of AR 33 concurrency |
| Jackson | Tupelo | 40.9 | 65.8 | AR 33 south – Augusta | Northern end of AR 33 concurrency |
| Jackson | Erwin | 52.6 | 84.7 | AR 14 to US 67 – Waldenburg | |
| Jackson | Erwin | 52.8 | 85.0 | To AR 14 east – Waldenburg | Access via AR 14Y |
| Jackson | Newport | 55.0 | 88.5 | I-57 / US 67 – Searcy, Walnut Ridge, Jonesboro | Exit 82 on I-57 |
| Jackson | Newport | 55.7 | 89.6 | AR 14 – Newport, Oil Trough, Batesville | Northern terminus |
| Jackson | Gap in route | | | | |
| Jackson | Diaz | 0.0 | 0.0 | AR 18 east – Newport, Grubbs | Southern terminus; western terminus of AR 18 |
| Jackson | Diaz | 1.0 | 1.6 | AR 157 south | Northern terminus of AR 157 |
| Jackson | Diaz | 2.3 | 3.7 | AR 18 west – Newark | Eastern terminus of AR 18 |
| Jackson | | 7.9 | 12.7 | AR 226 – Tuckerman | |
| Jackson | | 9.4 | 15.1 | AR 37 – Cord, Tuckerman | Northern terminus |
1.000 mi = 1.609 km; 1.000 km = 0.621 mi: Concurrency terminus
