= Arkansas Highway 146 =

State highway in Arkansas, United States

Highway 146
- Highway 146 sections in red, Highway 146S in blue

Route information
- Maintained by ArDOT
- Existed: c. January 1, 1932–present

Section 1
- Length: 12.96 mi (20.86 km)
- West end: US 79 near Stuttgart
- East end: White River at Preston Ferry

Section 2
- Length: 17.43 mi (28.05 km)
- West end: Resort Rd at Lawrenceville
- East end: AR 39 at Noy

Location
- Country: United States
- State: Arkansas
- Counties: Arkansas, Monroe, Phillips

Highway system
- Arkansas Highway System; Interstate; US; State; Business; Spurs; Suffixed; Scenic; Heritage
← AR 145	→ AR 147

Highway 146 (AR 146, Ark. 146, and Hwy. 146) is a designation for two east–west state highways in the Lower Arkansas Delta. One route of 12.96 miles (20.86 km) begins at US Highway 79 (US 79) near Stuttgart and runs east to the White River at Preston Ferry. A second route of 17.43 miles (28.05 km) begins at Lawrenceville and runs east to Highway 39 at Noy. Both routes are maintained by the Arkansas State Highway and Transportation Department (AHTD).

== Route description ==
=== Stuttgart to Preston Ferry ===
Highway 146 begins at US 79 north of Stuttgart on the Grand Prairie. The route runs due east as a section line road, immediately crossing railroad tracks and intersecting with Highway 146 Spur. Highway 146 runs east to briefly overlap Highway 33 at Casscoe. The route continues east to the a boat ramp on the White River at Preston Ferry, where it terminates.

=== Lawrenceville to Noy ===
Highway 146 begins at Resort Rd at Lawrenceville, on the banks of Maddox Bay and along the eastern limits of the White River National Wildlife Refuge. The route runs east, beginning an overlap with Highway 17 toward Holly Grove. The concurrency ends south of Holly Grove, with Highway 146 turning east, passing the Holly Grove Municipal Airport, and passing through agricultural areas. The route briefly runs along the Monroe/Phillips County line before entering Phillips County. The route passes a swamp before terminating at a junction with Highway 39 at Noy.

== History ==
Highway 146 was created by the Arkansas State Highway Commission between January 1, 1932 and June 1933 as a route between State Road 3 (now US 79) near Stuttgart through Crocket's Bluff to State Road 1 near St. Charles. The route was truncated at Casscoe during an extension of Highway 33 on May 9, 1956, and the segment serving Crocket's Bluff was redesignated as Highway 153.

A second segment of Highway 146 was created on June 23, 1965, designating a roadway located south of Holly Grove running east as a state highway. This route was extended to the Phillips County line on November 23, 1966. At the request of the Monroe County Judge, the highway was extended west to Lawrenceville on April 27, 1971, in exchange for a truncation of Highway 86 near Clarendon. The route was extended from the Phillips County line to Highway 39 at the request of the Phillips County Judge, in exchange for a truncation of Highway 44 on May 14, 1980.

== Major intersections ==
Mile markers reset at concurrencies.

County	Location	mi	km	Destinations	Notes
Arkansas		0.00	0.00	US 79 – Clarendon, Stuttgart	Western terminus
Arkansas		0.04	0.064	AR 146S – Stuttgart	Northern terminus of AR 146S
Arkansas		2.42– 0.00	3.89– 0.00	AR 33 – Roe	
Arkansas	Preston Ferry	10.24	16.48	White River	Eastern terminus
Gap in route
Monroe	Lawrenceville	0.00	0.00	Resort Road	Western terminus
Monroe		1.98– 0.00	3.19– 0.00	AR 17 west – Holly Grove	
Phillips	Noy	15.45	24.86	AR 39 – Turner	Eastern terminus
1.000 mi = 1.609 km; 1.000 km = 0.621 mi: Concurrency terminus

== Spur route ==
Highway 146S
- Location: Arkansas County
- Length: 1.35 mi (2.17 km)
- Existed: May 26, 1978–present

Highway 146 Spur (AR 146S, Ark. 146S, and Hwy. 146S) is a spur route of 1.35 miles (2.17 km) in Arkansas County. The route begins at Highway 146 and runs southwest, parallel to US 79 into Stuttgart to a junction with US 165, where it terminates. The spur route was created on November 23, 1966 on a former alignment of US 79. Due to an expansion by the St. Louis Southwestern Railway, the roadway was obliterated and shifted onto new right-of-way on November 27, 1974. The railroad donated all right-of-way and constructed the highway in exchange for the Arkansas State Highway Commission allowing the shifted alignment.

Major intersections
The entire route is in Arkansas County.

Location	mi	km	Destinations	Notes
	0.00	0.00	AR 146	Northern terminus
Stuttgart	1.35	2.17	US 165 (Park Avenue) – DeWitt, England	Southern terminus
1.000 mi = 1.609 km; 1.000 km = 0.621 mi
