= Arkansas Highway 86 =

State highway in Arkansas, United States

Highway 86

Route information
- Maintained by ArDOT
- Existed: April 12, 1940 (Note: Map note: Added by Resolution 4/12/40 86-S-3 7.0)–present

Section 1
- Length: 13.27 mi (21.36 km)
- East end: AR 38 at Hayley
- West end: CR 521 / CR 522

Section 2
- Length: 25.33 mi (40.76 km)
- West end: US 70 at Screeton
- East end: AR 33

Section 3
- Length: 20.17 mi (32.46 km)
- West end: Pine Tree Road/Lumber Lane near Clarendon
- East end: US 49

Location
- Country: United States
- State: Arkansas
- Counties: Prairie, Monroe, Phillips

Highway system
- Arkansas Highway System; Interstate; US; State; Business; Spurs; Suffixed; Scenic; Heritage
← AR 85	→ AR 87

Highway 86 (AR 86, Ark. 86, and Hwy. 86) is a mostly north–south highway in central Arkansas. Its southern terminus is at an intersection with U.S. Route 63 2 miles (3.2 km) east of Slovak. 1-mile (1.6 km) west of Slovak, it turns north at Highway 343 and continues north and west until it intersects U.S. Highway 70 4 miles (6.4 km) east of Carlisle. North of U.S. 70, it continues for 4 miles (6.4 km) as Anderson Road before again becoming a state highway continuing east and north for 13 miles (21 km) before ending at Highway 38 5 miles (8.0 km) east of Hickory Plains. (Note: Although Arkansas highways normally run from south to north and from west to east, the Prairie County Route and Section Map indicates that Highway 86 begins at Highway 38 and ends at a county road intersection.)

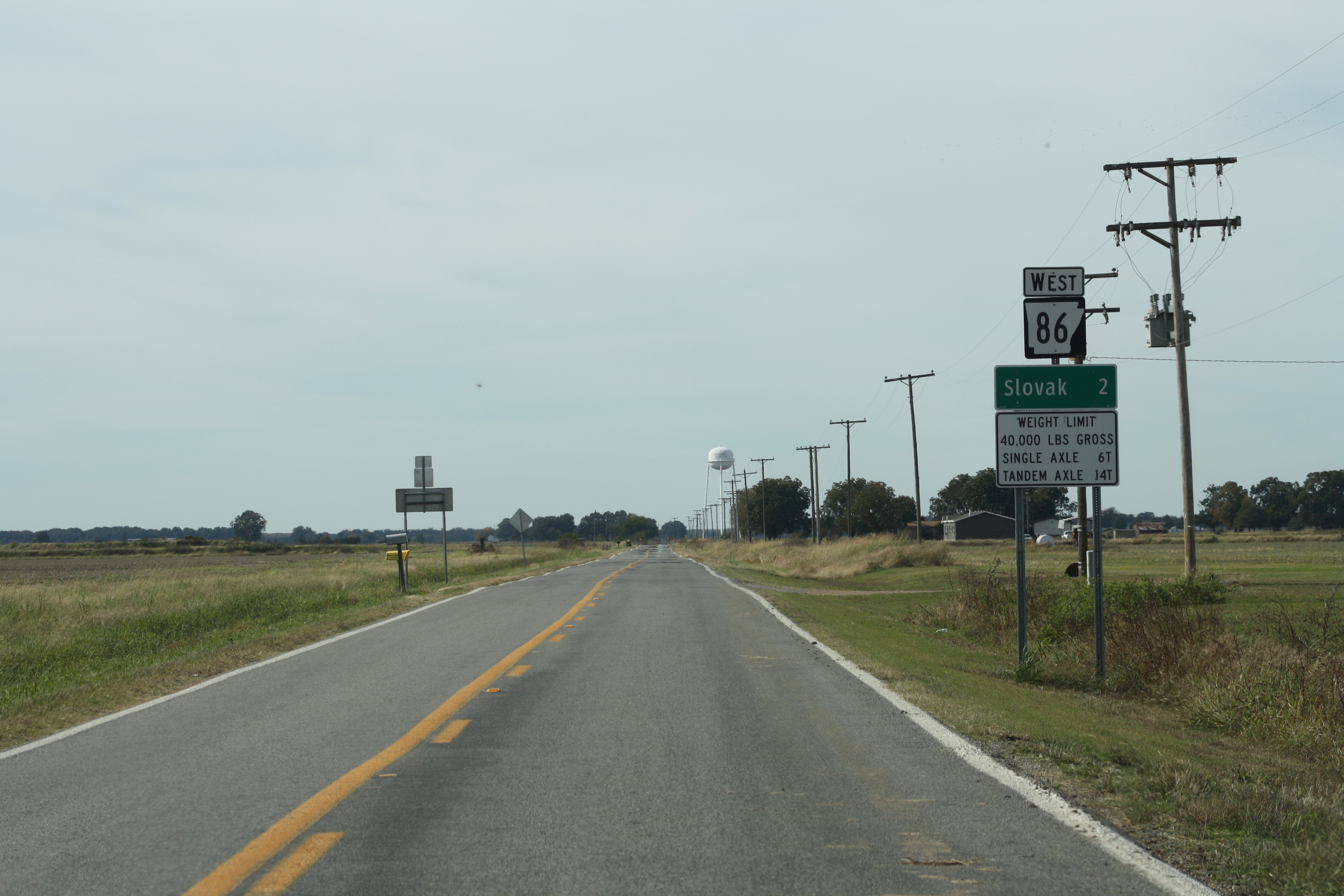
Highway 86 near Slovak

== History ==
Highway 86 was created between Holly Grove and the current eastern terminus at Highway 20 (Note: Highway 20 was supplanted by US 49 in 1963.) on April 12, 1940. A second segment was created in 1953 between Slovak and Highway 11 (Note: Highway 11 was supplanted by US 63.) in Prairie County. The route was extended over Highway 11 through Tollville on July 10, 1957 and east to Highway 33 on June 29, 1960. On April 24, 1963, both segments were extended westward, with the Prairie County section adding 7 miles (11 km) west of Slovak, and the Monroe County section extended northwest from Holly Grove to Highway 241 (Note: Highway 241 was supplanted by Highway 302 in 1977.) north of Clarendon. On June 23, 1965, the Prairie County section was extended north to the current western terminus at Screeton, and the third section of Highway 86 was designated between Hayley and a county road near Wattensaw Bayou.

The northern 0.7 miles (1.1 km) of the Monroe County route was deleted in a swap to add length to Highway 146 on April 27, 1971, leaving the route to terminate at the current county road intersection.

When the Arkansas General Assembly passed Act 9 of 1973, county judges and legislators were directed to designate up to 12 miles (19 km) of county roads as state highways in each county.

An earlier Highway 86 was created in the 1926 renumbering from US 71 just south of Gillham southwest to the Oklahoma state line. This route was removed in 1929, and is now known as Bellah Mine Road.

== Major intersections ==
Mile markers reset at some concurrencies.

County	Location	mi	km	Destinations	Notes
Prairie	Hayley	0.00	0.00	AR 38 – Des Arc, Cabot	Eastern terminus
Prairie		9.27	14.92	AR 302 east	AR 302 western terminus
Prairie		13.27	21.36	CR 521 / CR 522	Western terminus
Prairie	Gap in route				
Prairie	Screeton	0.00	0.00	US 70 – Hazen, Lonoke	Western terminus
Prairie	Slovak	14.14	22.76	AR 343 south	AR 343 northern terminus
Prairie		16.69– 0.00	26.86– 0.00	US 63 – Stuttgart, Hazen	
Prairie		8.64	13.90	AR 33 – Clarendon, DeValls Bluff	Eastern terminus
Gap in route
Monroe		0.00	0.00	Pine Tree Road/Lumber Lane	Western terminus
Monroe		1.56– 1.61	2.51– 2.59	US 79 – Clarendon, Marianna	officially designated exception (Note: Map Note: 1.56-1.61 OVER U.S.79 0.05 MI EXCEP.)
Monroe	Holly Grove	10.93– 11.80	17.59– 18.99	AR 17 (Smith Street) – St. Charles, DeWitt, Brinkley	officially designated exception (Note: Map Note: 10.93-11.80 OVER S.H.17 0.87 MI EXCEP.)
Monroe				AR 366 east – Blackton	AR 366 western terminus
Phillips		20.17	32.46	US 49 – Brinkley, Helena-West Helena	Eastern terminus
1.000 mi = 1.609 km; 1.000 km = 0.621 mi: Concurrency terminus

== Former route ==
State Road 86
- Location: Sevier County
- Length: 7 mi (11 km)
- Existed: April 1, 1926–c. September 1, 1928

State Road 86 (AR 86, Ark. 86, and Hwy. 86) is a former Arkansas state highway of 7 miles (11 km) in Sevier County.

=== Route description ===
The highway began at U.S. Highway 71 approximately 9 miles (14 km) north of DeQueen and ran west approximately 7 miles (11 km) to the Arkansas–Oklahoma State Line.

=== History ===
Highway 86 was designated as one of the original state highways on April 1, 1926. This segment was deleted after September 1, 1928 and before September 1, 1929. (Note: Highway 86 appears on the 1928 highway map, but is removed by 1929.)

=== Major intersections ===
The entire route was in Sevier County.

Location	mi	km	Destinations	Notes
	0	0.0	Oklahoma state line	Western terminus
Gillham	7	11	US 71 – DeQueen, Mena	Eastern terminus
1.000 mi = 1.609 km; 1.000 km = 0.621 mi

== See also ==
- List of state highways in Arkansas
