= Arkansas Highway 153 =

State highway in Arkansas, United States

Highway 153

Route information
- Maintained by ArDOT

Section 1
- Length: 29.8 mi (48.0 km)
- South end: AR 17 near Ethel
- Major intersections: AR 1 near Van; AR 33
- North end: AR 130 east of Stuttgart

Location
- Country: United States
- State: Arkansas
- Counties: Arkansas

Highway system
- Arkansas Highway System; Interstate; US; State; Business; Spurs; Suffixed; Scenic; Heritage
← AR 152	→ AR 154

Arkansas Highway 153 (AR 153, Ark. 153, and Hwy. 153) is the designation for a state highway which is entirely located in Arkansas County. The route begins at AR 17 just north of Ethel and ends at AR 130 a few miles east of Stuttgart. The route is very rural.

== Route description ==
The southern terminus of AR 153 is at AR 17 just north of Ethel, or about three miles (4.8 km) south of St. Charles. The route heads west, towards the unincorporated community of Van, before intersecting AR 1 about four miles (6.4 km) northeast of DeWitt. The route runs concurrently with AR 1 for about four miles (6.4 km) before heading splitting apart and heading towards the town of Crocketts Bluff. The route eventually intersects AR 33 at LaGrue, which also shares a short concurrency before continuing to head west. AR 153 ends shortly after, at the intersection of AR 130 about seven miles (11 km) east of Stuttgart at the University of Arkansas Rice Research and Extension Center (unsigned AR 815). The route is about 29.8 miles (48.0 km) long and is entirely located in Arkansas County.

== Major intersections ==
The entire route is in Arkansas County.

Location	mi	km	Destinations	Notes
Ethel	0.0	0.0	AR 17 – Ethel, St. Charles	Southern terminus
Van	6.7	10.8	AR 1 south – DeWitt	Southern end of AR 1 concurrency
	10.8	17.4	AR 1 north – St. Charles, Marvell	Northern end of AR 1 concurrency
	22.5	36.2	AR 33 north – Casscoe, Roe, Clarendon	Northern end of AR 33 concurrency
LaGrue	23.0	37.0	AR 33 south – DeWitt	Southern end of AR 33 concurrency
	29.8	48.0	AR 130 – Stuttgart, Almyra, DeWitt	Northern terminus
1.000 mi = 1.609 km; 1.000 km = 0.621 mi
