= Orenthal =

Orenthal is a masculine given name. Notable people with the name include:

- Orenthal James Simpson or O. J. Simpson (1947–2024), American football running back and actor
- Orenthal O'Neal or Oren O'Neal (born 1983), American football fullback

== See also ==
- Orinthal Anderson (1920–1977), American baseball player
