= Arkansas Highway 343 =

State highway in Arkansas, United States

Highway 343

Route information
- Maintained by ArDOT
- Existed: October 27, 1965–present

Section 1
- Length: 4.04 mi (6.50 km)
- South end: Wheeler Lake Road near Bayou Meto
- North end: AR 11 near Bayou Meto

Section 2
- Length: 9.56 mi (15.39 km)
- South end: AR 152 near Lodge Corner
- North end: US 79 near Stuttgart

Section 3
- Length: 8.59 mi (13.82 km)
- South end: US 165 near Stuttgart
- North end: AR 86 near Slovak

Location
- Country: United States
- State: Arkansas
- Counties: Arkansas, Prairie

Highway system
- Arkansas Highway System; Interstate; US; State; Business; Spurs; Suffixed; Scenic; Heritage
← AR 342	→ AR 344

Highway 343 (AR 343, Ark. 343, and Hwy. 343) is a designation for three state highways in the Arkansas Grand Prairie. One route runs 4.04 miles (6.50 km) north from a county road to Highway 11. A second route begins at Highway 152 and runs 9.56 miles (15.39 km) to US Highway 63 (US 63) and US 79 west of Stuttgart. A third route begins at US 165 and runs 8.59 miles (13.82 km) north to Highway 86 near Slovak. All three routes are maintained by the Arkansas Department of Transportation (ArDOT).

== Route description ==
All three routes are short, two-lane, low-traffic rural highways located in the Grand Prairie, a flat agricultural area crossed by lakes and bayou known for rice cultivation and aquaculture.

=== South Arkansas County ===
Highway 343 begins 2 miles (3.2 km) north of Bayou Meto in the southern part of Arkansas County. The southern terminus is at Wheeler Lake Road, with the roadway continuing south as Pat Lane. The highway runs north as a section line road until an intersection with Highway 11, where it terminates. As of 2016, the route had an annual average daily traffic (AADT) of 90 vehicles per day (VPD).

=== West Arkansas County ===
Highway 343 begins at an intersection with Highway 152 a few miles east of the Bayou Meto Wildlife Management Area (WMA). It runs north as a section line road across King Bayou, with two small jogs turning the highway east–west. It terminates at US 63/US 79 west of Stuttgart. As of 2016, the route had an AADT of 200 VPD.

=== Prairie County ===
Highway 343 begins at U.S 165 in the southern tip of Prairie County. It runs north as a section line road west of the Stuttgart Municipal Airport. The highway continues past county road intersections, aquaculture ponds, drainage ditches, and fields. The route terminates at Highway 86 near Slovak. As of 2016, the route had an AADT of 150 VPD.

== History ==
Two routes of Highway 343 were created by the Arkansas State Highway Commission (ASHC) on October 27, 1965. The highway in southern Arkansas County was created November 23, 1966.

== Major intersections ==
County	Location	mi	km	Destinations	Notes
Arkansas		0.00	0.00	Wheeler Lake Road	Southern terminus
Arkansas		4.04	6.50	AR 11 – Reydell	Northern terminus
Arkansas	Gap in route				
Arkansas		0.00	0.00	AR 152	Southern terminus
Arkansas		9.56	15.39	US 63 / US 79 – Stuttgart, Clarendon, Humphrey, Pine Bluff	Northern terminus
Gap in route
Prairie		0.00	0.00	US 165 – Humnoke, England, Stuttgart	Southern terminus
Prairie		8.59	13.82	AR 86	Northern terminus
1.000 mi = 1.609 km; 1.000 km = 0.621 mi
