= Arkansas Highway 33 =

Highway in Arkansas

Highway 33

Route information
- Maintained by ArDOT
- Existed: 1926–present

Section 1
- Length: 21.76 mi (35.02 km)
- South end: AR 130 near Almyra
- North end: US 79 in Roe

Section 2
- Length: 13.03 mi (20.97 km)
- South end: US 79 near Roe
- North end: US 70 in DeValls Bluff

Section 3
- Length: 33.79 mi (54.38 km)
- South end: US 70 in Biscoe
- Major intersections: I-40 near Biscoe
- North end: US 64 near Augusta

Section 4
- Length: 17.34 mi (27.91 km)
- South end: US 64 in Augusta
- North end: AR 37 near Tupelo

Location
- Country: United States
- State: Arkansas
- Counties: Arkansas, Prairie, Monroe, Woodruff, Jackson

Highway system
- Arkansas Highway System; Interstate; US; State; Business; Spurs; Suffixed; Scenic; Heritage
← AR 32	→ AR 34

Arkansas Highway 33 (AR 33) is a designation for four state highways in east Arkansas. One segment of 21.76 miles (35.02 km) runs from Highway 130 east of Almyra north to U.S. Route 79 (US 79) in Roe. A second segment of 13.03 miles (20.97 km) runs from US 79 north of Roe north to US 70 in DeValls Bluff. A third segment of 33.79 miles (54.38 km) runs from US 70 in Biscoe north to US 64 east of Augusta. A fourth segment of 17.34 miles (27.91 km) runs from US 64 in Augusta north to Highway 37 east of Tupelo.

== Route description ==
=== Almyra to Roe ===
Highway 33 begins at Highway 130 east of Almyra in Arkansas County on the Grand Prairie in the Arkansas Delta. The route runs north to a brief overlap with Highway 153 at Lagrue, followed by the western terminus of Highway 33S at Casscoe. Continuing north, Highway 33 reaches a T-intersection with Highway 146. The route forms a 1.0 mile (1.6 km) concurrency with Highway 146 before turning north toward Monroe County. After riding the Arkansas-Monroe county line for approximately 1.5 miles (2.4 km), the route enters Prairie County for 2.49 miles (4.01 km) before entering the western portion of Monroe County. The route serves as the western terminus for Highway 366 before entering the town of Roe, where it terminates at US 79.

=== Roe to DeValls Bluff ===
The route begins at US 79 north of Roe and runs northwest, passing the Clarendon Municipal Airport before exiting Prairie County northbound.

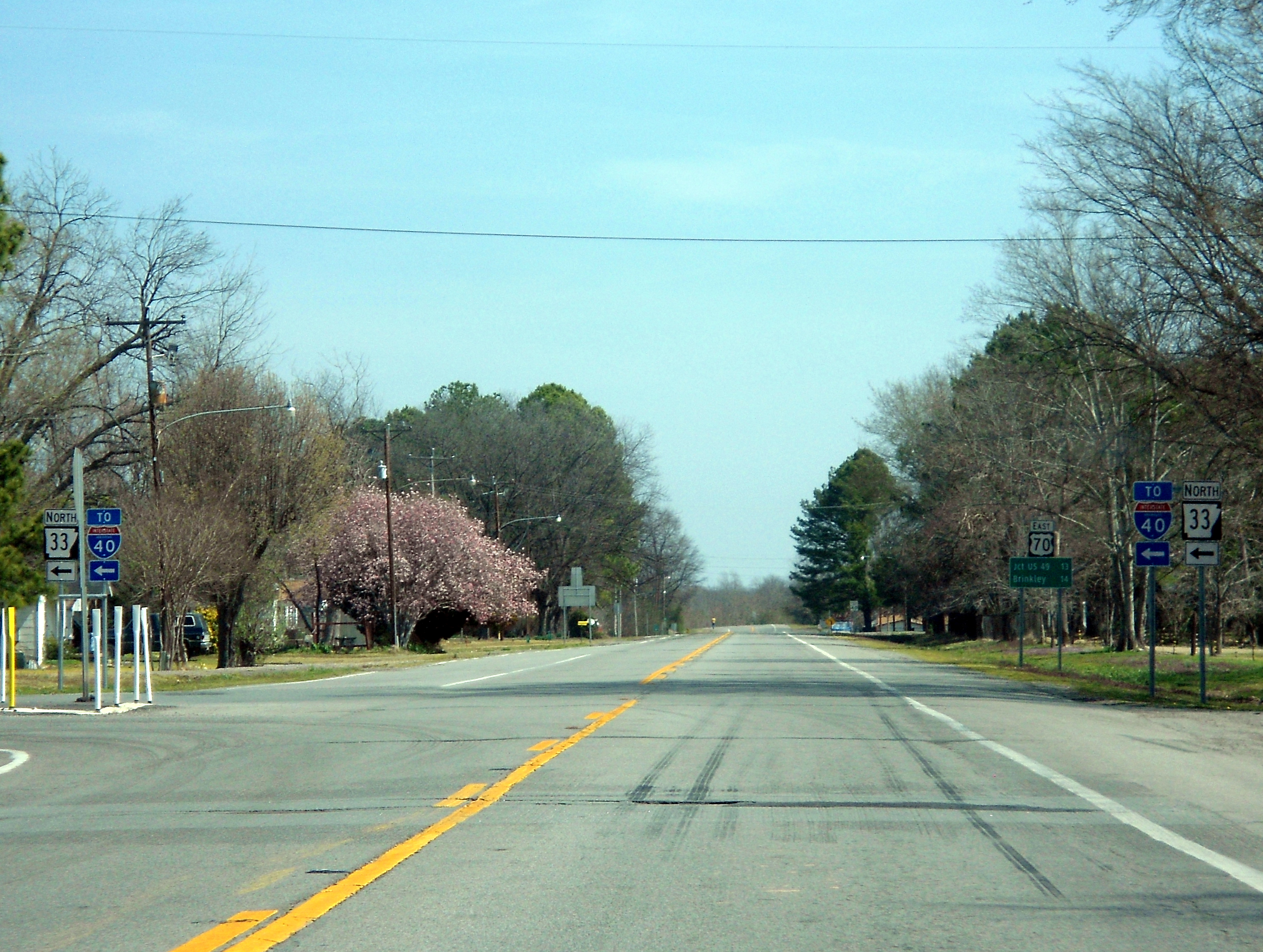
Highway 33 at US 70 in Biscoe

Returning to Prairie County, Highway 33 serves has intersections with Highway 86 and Highway 302 and passes farm fields and channel catfish aquaculture ponds before entering DeValls Bluff, one of two county seats of Prairie County, where it terminates at US 70.

=== Biscoe to Augusta ===
The route begins at US 70 in Fredonia (Biscoe) and runs north, interchanging with Interstate 40 (I-40) and passing agricultural land on the west side of the road and the Cache River National Wildlife Refuge to the east. Highway 33 has an 6.7-mile (10.8 km) overlap with Highway 38 east of Des Arc until meeting the Woodruff County line at Little Dixie.

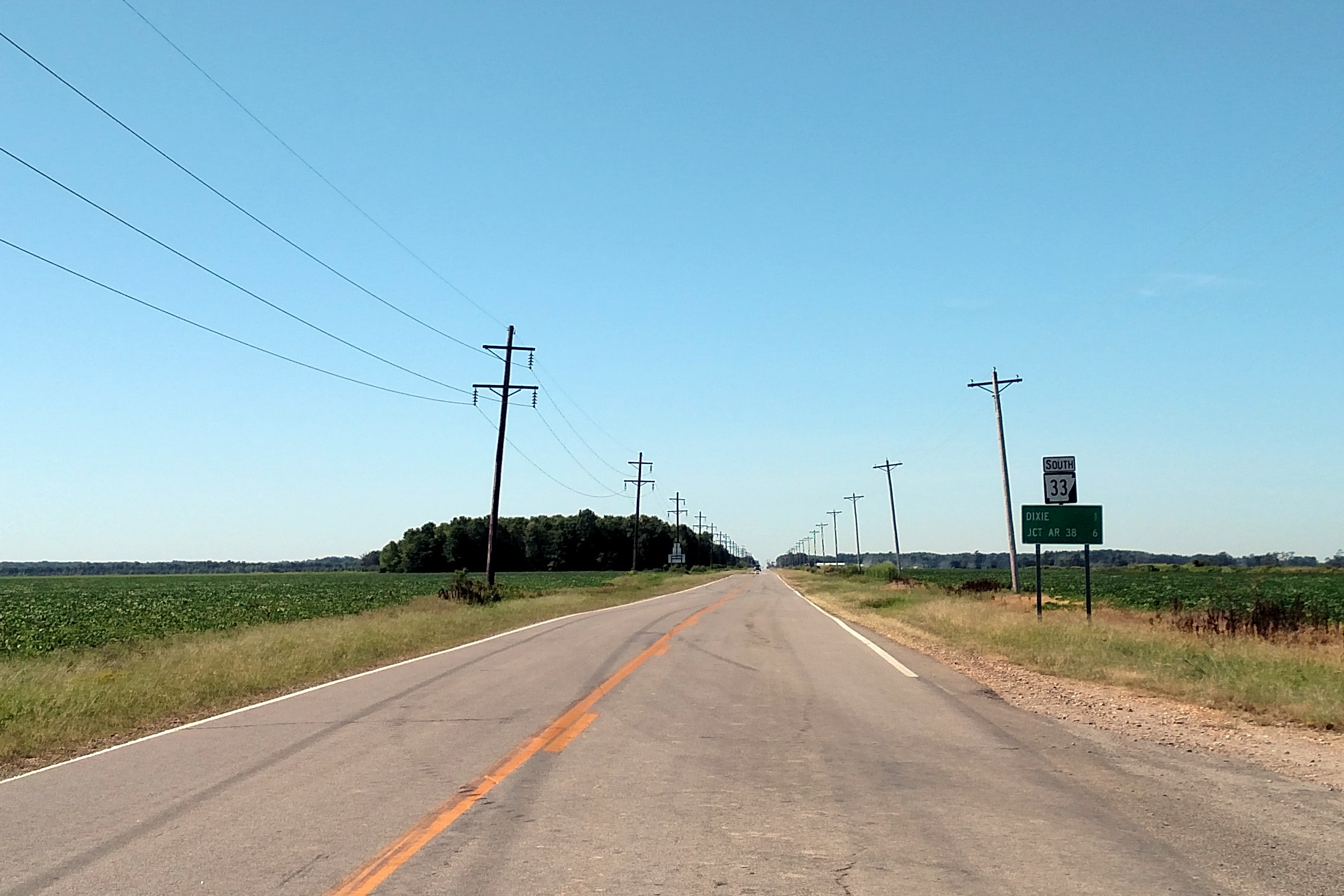
Highway 33 south of Gregory

Upon entering Woodruff County, the route continues north along the western edge of the Cache River NWR, encountering Highway 262 twice and passing through Gregory. Highway 33 intersects Highway 260 before nearing Augusta and intersecting Highway 33C, before terminating at US 64 east of Augusta.

=== Augusta to Tupelo ===
The route begins at US 64 in Augusta and runs north a rural route passing through agricultural areas.

Upon entering the southern portion of Jackson County, Highway 33 runs east to Tupelo, where a concurrency with Highway 17 forms for approximately 1.5 miles (2.4 km) to Overcup, when it turns east, crosses the Cache River, and terminates at Highway 37.

== History ==
Highway 33 was an original Arkansas state highway, running from Roe to Tupelo in Jackson County. The highway was extended south from US 79 in Roe to its current southern terminus by the Arkansas State Highway Commission (ASHC) on May 9, 1956. Highway 33's original alignment through Augusta was restored to the state highway system in 1956 as Highway 33C. The alignment was shifted slightly in 1970 to pass by the Clarendon Municipal Airport.

== Major intersections ==
Mile markers reset at some concurrencies.

County	Location	mi	km	Destinations	Notes
Arkansas		0.00	0.00	AR 130	Southern terminus
Arkansas	Lagrue	5.60	9.01	AR 153 west	Southern end of AR 153 concurrency
Arkansas		6.30	10.14	AR 153 east – Crocketts Bluff	Northern end of AR 153 concurrency
Arkansas	Casscoe	11.23	18.07	AR 33S north	Southern terminus of AR 33S
Arkansas		11.76	18.93	AR 146 east – Preston Ferry	Southern end of AR 146 concurrency
Arkansas		12.77	20.55	AR 146 west – Stuttgart	Northern end of AR 146 concurrency
Prairie	No major junctions				
Monroe		19.98	32.15	AR 366 east – White River NWR	Western terminus of AR 366
Monroe	Roe	21.76	35.02	US 79 – Stuttgart, Clarendon	Northern terminus
Monroe	Gap in route				
Monroe		0.00	0.00	US 79 – Stuttgart, Clarendon	Southern terminus
Prairie		6.03	9.70	AR 86 west	Eastern terminus of AR 86
Prairie		9.97	16.05	AR 302 east	Western terminus of AR 302
Prairie	DeValls Bluff	13.03	20.97	US 70 – Hazen, Brinkley	Northern terminus
Prairie	Gap in route				
Prairie	Fredonia (Biscoe)	0.00	0.00	US 70 – Hazen, Brinkley	Southern terminus
Prairie		2.07	3.33	I-40 – Memphis, Little Rock	Exit 202 on I-40
Prairie		13.59	21.87	AR 38 west – Des Arc	Southern end of AR 38 concurrency
Prairie–Woodruff county line	Little Dixie	0.00	0.00	AR 38 east – Cotton Plant	Northern end of AR 38 concurrency
Woodruff		6.13	9.87	AR 262 east – McClelland	Western terminus of AR 262
Woodruff		12.57	20.23	AR 262 west – McClelland	Eastern terminus of AR 226
Woodruff		17.17	27.63	AR 260 east – Grays	Western terminus of AR 260
Woodruff		19.19	30.88	AR 33C north – Augusta	Southern terminus of AR 33C
Woodruff		20.20	32.51	US 64 – Bald Knob, McCrory	Northern terminus
Woodruff	Gap in route				
Woodruff	Augusta	0.00	0.00	US 64 – Bald Knob, McCrory	Southern terminus
Jackson	Tupelo	12.33	19.84	AR 17 north	Southern end of AR 17 concurrency
Jackson		0.00	0.00	AR 17 south	Northern end of AR 17 concurrency
Jackson		5.01	8.06	AR 37	Northern terminus
1.000 mi = 1.609 km; 1.000 km = 0.621 mi: Concurrency terminus

== Auxiliary routes ==
Arkansas Highway 33 has two auxiliary routes. Highway 33 Spur is a short spur route near Casscoe serving as a connector to a residential area near the White River. Highway 33 City is a business route in Augusta serving the downtown business district while the parent route bypasses the city to the east and north.

=== Casscoe spur ===
Highway 33S
- Location: Arkansas County
- Length: 1.75 mi (2.82 km)

Arkansas Highway 33 Spur is a spur route of 1.75 miles (2.82 km) near Casscoe. The route runs from Highway 33 east to Daisy Lane near the White River.

Major intersections
The entire route is in Arkansas County.

Location	mi	km	Destinations	Notes
Casscoe	0.00	0.00	AR 33	Southern terminus
	1.75	2.82	Daisy Lane	Northern terminus
1.000 mi = 1.609 km; 1.000 km = 0.621 mi

=== Augusta city route ===
Highway 33C
- Location: Augusta
- Length: 3.10 mi (4.99 km)
- Existed: May 9, 1956–present

Arkansas Highway 33 City is a business route of 3.10 miles (4.99 km) in Augusta.

Route description

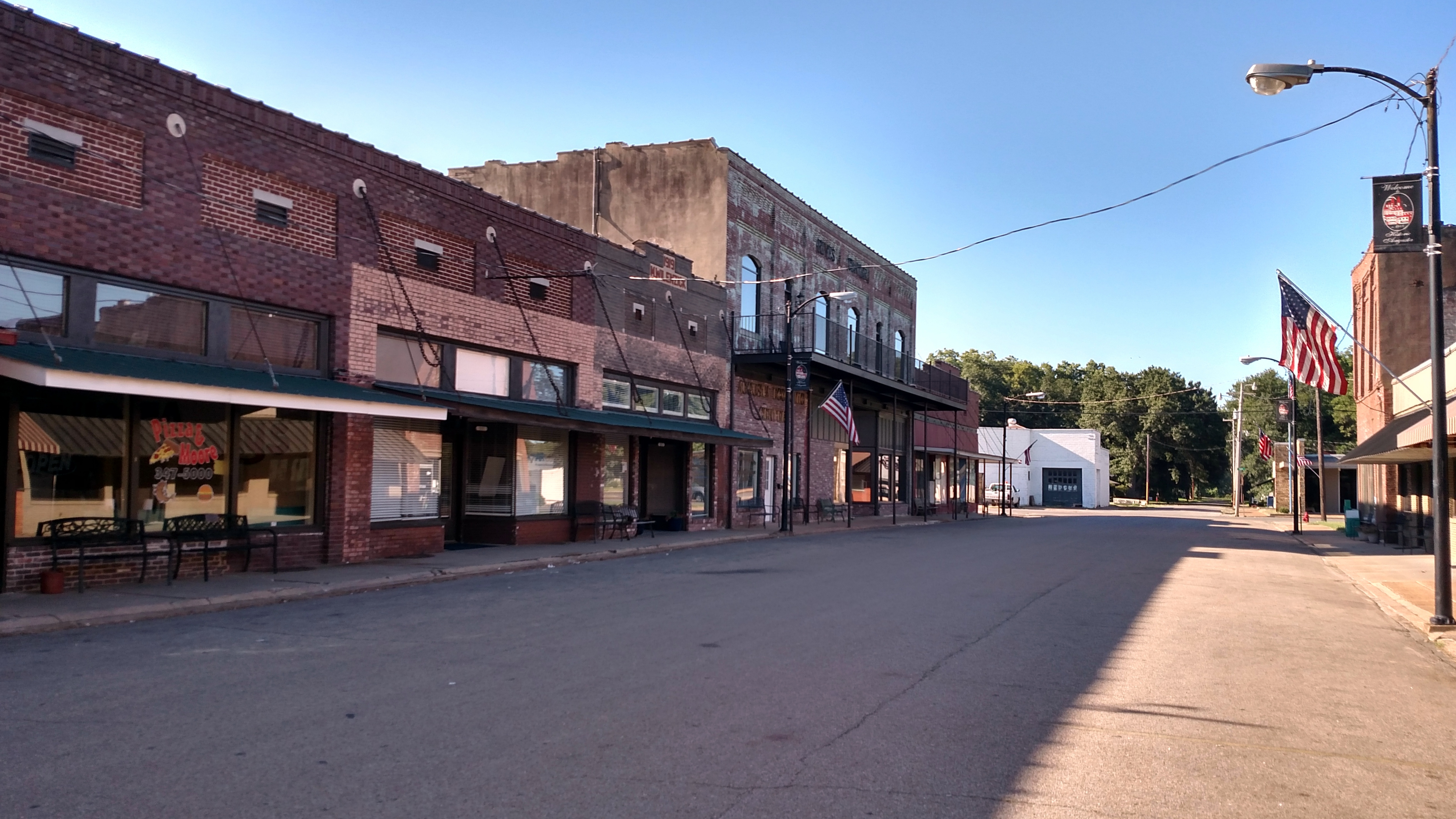
US 64B/Highway 33C in downtown Augusta

Highway 33C begins at Highway 33 southeast of Augusta. The highway runs due west into the city's southern portion, or New Augusta., as Gregory Street. In the city limits, Highway 33C curves north and becomes 6th Street, turns west becoming Sycamore Street and turns again north on 3rd Street. Highway 33C begins an overlap with US 64B at Main Street, and the two highways pass through the Augusta Commercial Historic District. Now in the oldest part of Augusta, the highways are also paralleled by the Augusta History Walk. Highway 33C passes the Ferguson House, Augusta Presbyterian Church and Woodruff County Courthouse, all listed on the National Register of Historic Places before turning onto Magnolia Street, passing the Augusta Memorial Park, turning onto 5th Street, and terminating at US 64.

History

Highway 33's original alignment through Augusta was restored to the state highway system in 1956 as Highway 33 City.

Major intersections
The entire route is in Augusta, Woodruff County.

mi	km	Destinations	Notes
0.00	0.00	AR 33	Southern terminus
1.32	2.12	AR 339 south (6th Street)	Northern terminus of AR 339
2.22	3.57	US 64B east (Main Street)	Southern end of US 64B concurrency
3.10	4.99	US 64 (Shell Street) – McCrory, Bald Knob US 64B ends	Northern terminus; western terminus of US 64B
1.000 mi = 1.609 km; 1.000 km = 0.621 mi

== See also ==
- List of state highways in Arkansas
