= David Walker (linebacker) =

American football player (born 2000)

No. 51 – Tampa Bay Buccaneers
- Position: Outside linebacker
- Roster status: Active

Personal information
- Born: June 3, 2000 (age 26)
- Listed height: 6 ft 2 in (1.88 m)
- Listed weight: 260 lb (118 kg)

Career information
- High school: Stuttgart (Stuttgart, Arkansas)
- College: Southern Arkansas (2020–2021); Central Arkansas (2022–2024)
- NFL draft: 2025: 4th round, 121st overall pick

Career history
- Tampa Bay Buccaneers (2025–present)

Awards and highlights
- Buck Buchanan Award (2024); First-team FCS All-American (2024)
- Stats at Pro Football Reference

David Walker (born June 3, 2000) is an American professional football outside linebacker for the Tampa Bay Buccaneers of the National Football League (NFL). He played college football for the Southern Arkansas Muleriders and Central Arkansas Bears and was selected by the Buccaneers in the fourth round of the 2025 NFL draft.

== Early life ==
Walker attended Stuttgart High School in Stuttgart, Arkansas.

== College career ==
Walker attended Southern Arkansas University in 2020 and 2021 before transferring to Central Arkansas University. He played at Central Arkansas from 2022 to 2024. As a senior in 2024, he won the Buck Buchanan Award after recording 68 tackles and 10.5 sacks. In his three years at Central Arkansas, he had 191 tackles and 31 sacks.

== Professional career ==
Pre-draft measurables
| Height | Weight | Arm length | Hand span | Wingspan | 40-yard dash | 10-yard split | 20-yard split | 20-yard shuttle | Three-cone drill | Vertical jump | Broad jump | Bench press |
|---|---|---|---|---|---|---|---|---|---|---|---|---|
| 6 ft 0 7/8 in (1.85 m) | 263 lb (119 kg) | 31 7/8 in (0.81 m) | 9 1/4 in (0.23 m) | 6 ft 5 1/2 in (1.97 m) | 4.69 s | 1.65 s | 2.74 s | 4.39 s | 7.15 s | 35.0 in (0.89 m) | 9 ft 10 in (3.00 m) | 26 reps |
All values from NFL Combine

Walker was selected by the Tampa Bay Buccaneers in the fourth round (121st pick) of the 2025 NFL draft. After tearing his ACL in training camp, the Buccaneers placed Walker on injured reserve on July 28, 2025.
