= Arkansas Highway 241 =

State highway in Arkansas, United States

Highway 241

Route information
- Maintained by ArDOT
- Length: 7.08 mi (11.39 km)
- Existed: July 10, 1957–present

Major junctions
- South end: US 49 / AR 39 near Monroe
- North end: AR 302 near Brinkley

Location
- Country: United States
- State: Arkansas
- Counties: Monroe

Highway system
- Arkansas Highway System; Interstate; US; State; Business; Spurs; Suffixed; Scenic; Heritage
← AR 240	→ AR 242

Highway 241 (AR 241, Ark. 241, and Hwy. 241) is a north–south state highway in Monroe County. The route of 7.08 miles (11.39 km) begins at US Highway 49 (US 49) and runs west and north to Highway 302. The route is maintained by the Arkansas State Highway and Transportation Department (AHTD).

== Route description ==
The route begins at US 49 and Highway 39 in eastern Monroe County in an aquaculture/agricultural area within the Arkansas Grand Prairie. Highway 241 runs due west as a section line road to an intersection with Highway 17 toward Keevil and Brinkley. After overlapping for 1.0 mile (1.6 km), Highway 241 turns due west, running to an intersection with Highway 302, where it terminates.

== History ==
Highway 241 was created by the Arkansas State Highway Commission on July 10, 1957 as a highway of 5.6 miles (9.0 km) between Clarendon and Keevil. The Commission later modified the previous order, extending the highway by 3.4 miles (5.5 km) on February 26, 1958. The route was extended east to Highway 17 at Keevil on July 2, 1960, and to US 49 and Highway 39 on June 23, 1965. On January 26, 1977, the north-south portion of the highway to Clarendon was redesignated as Highway 302 to improve route designation continuity, leaving the remaining segments of east–west section line road with an odd-numbered designation normally indicative of north–south routes.

== Major intersections ==
Mile markers reset at concurrencies. The entire route is in Monroe County.

Location	mi	km	Destinations	Notes
	0.00	0.00	US 49 / AR 39 south – Marvell, Brinkley, Blackton	Southern terminus, AR 39 northern terminus
Keevil	4.87– 0.00	7.84– 0.00	AR 17	
	2.21	3.56	AR 302 – Clarendon	Northern terminus
1.000 mi = 1.609 km; 1.000 km = 0.621 mi: Concurrency terminus
