= Arkansas Highway 39 =

State highway in Arkansas, United States

Highway 39

Route information
- Maintained by ArDOT
- Existed: 1926–present

Section 1
- Length: 8.89 mi (14.31 km)
- South end: AR 1 / AR 316 near Turner
- North end: US 49 near Hicksville

Section 2
- Length: 9.98 mi (16.06 km)
- South end: US 49 at Blackton
- Major intersections: US 79 at Monroe
- North end: US 49 / AR 241 near Rich

Location
- Country: United States
- State: Arkansas
- Counties: Monroe, Phillips

Highway system
- Arkansas Highway System; Interstate; US; State; Business; Spurs; Suffixed; Scenic; Heritage
← AR 38	→ I-40

Arkansas Highway 39 (AR 39) is a designation for two state highways in southeast Arkansas. One segment of 8.89 miles (14.31 km) runs from Highway 1 west of Turner north to U.S. Route 49 (US 49) west of Hicksville. A second segment of 9.98 miles (16.06 km) runs from US 49 at Blackton north to US 49 west of Rich.

== Route description ==
=== Turner to Hicksville ===
Highway 39 begins at Highway 1 and Highway 316 west of Turner and runs north to serve as the eastern terminus for Highway 146. The route continues north to Highway 39S, a short spur route to Postelle, before terminating at US 49 west of Hicksville. The AHTD revealed that the northern part of the route averages the highest AADT, registering 420 vehicles per day in 2010.

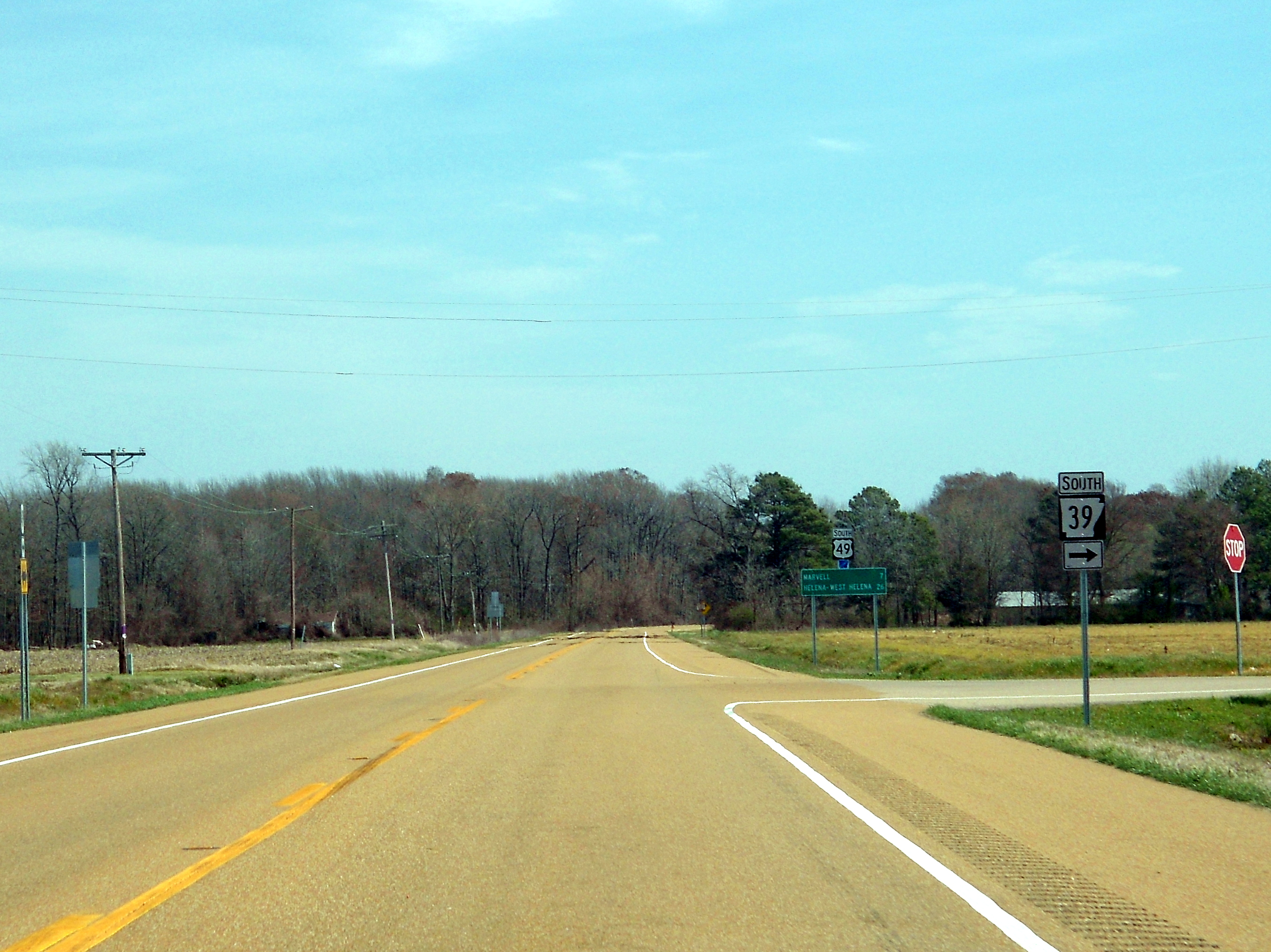
Northern terminus of Highway 39 at US 49

=== Blackton to Rich ===
The route begins at US 49 at Blackton and runs north to a junction with US 79 in Monroe. Highway 39 turns due west after this intersection until meeting Highway 39S, which connects to US 49. The route continues north before terminating at US 49 and Highway 241 west of Rich. A 2010 study of annual average daily traffic (AADT) by the Arkansas State Highway and Transportation Department (AHTD) reveals that no more than 380 vehicles use any portion of the route on a daily basis.

== History ==
Arkansas Highway 39 was one of the original 1926 state highways. The route ran north from State Road 1/State Road 25 in Paragould north across State Road 90 and State Road 34 to St. Francis.

== Major intersections ==
County	Location	mi	km	Destinations	Notes
Monroe		0.00	0.00	AR 1 / AR 316 east	Southern terminus; western terminus of AR 316
Phillips		1.84	2.96	AR 146 west	Eastern terminus of AR 146
Phillips		7.34	11.81	AR 39S west – Postelle	Eastern terminus of AR 39S
Phillips		8.89	14.31	US 49	Northern terminus
Gap in route
Monroe	Blackton	0.00	0.00	US 49 – Marvell, Brinkley	Southern terminus
Monroe	Monroe	5.09	8.19	US 79	
Monroe		6.73	10.83	AR 39S west	Eastern terminus of AR 39S
Monroe		9.98	16.06	US 49 / AR 241 north	Northern terminus; southern terminus of AR 241
1.000 mi = 1.609 km; 1.000 km = 0.621 mi

== Special routes ==
=== Monroe County spur ===
Highway 39S
- Location: Monroe County
- Length: 0.55 mi (890 m)

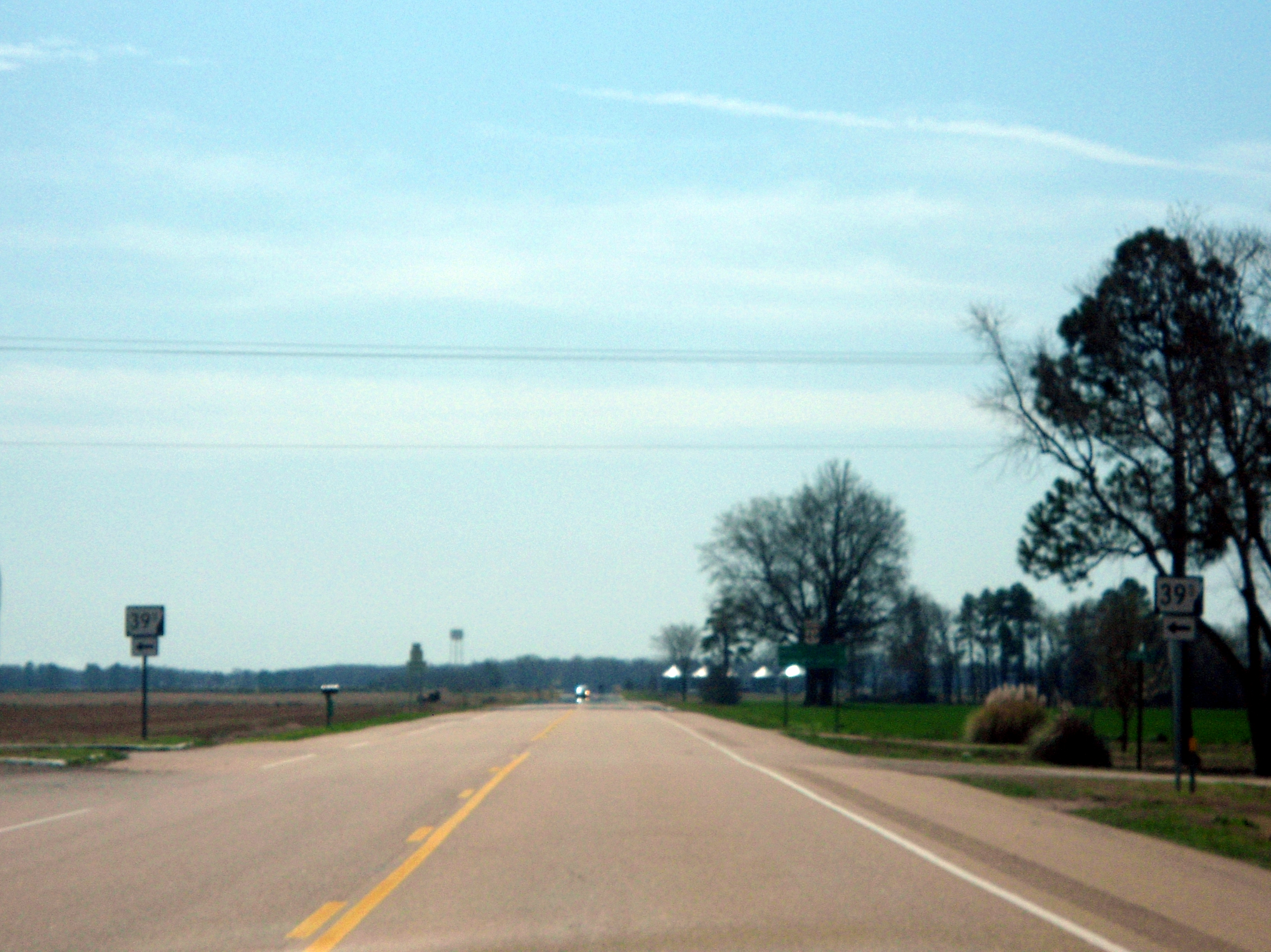
Highway 39S terminus at US 49

Arkansas Highway 39 Spur is an east–west state highway spur route in Monroe County. The route of 0.55 miles (0.89 km) serves as a short connector between Highway 39 and US 49.

Major intersections

The entire route is in Monroe County.

Location	mi	km	Destinations	Notes
	0.55	0.89	US 49	Western terminus
	0.00	0.00	AR 39	Eastern terminus
1.000 mi = 1.609 km; 1.000 km = 0.621 mi

=== Postelle spur ===
Highway 39S
- Location: Phillips County
- Length: 0.38 mi (610 m)

Arkansas Highway 39 Spur is an east–west state highway spur route that runs from Phillips CR 643 at Postelle east to Highway 39. The route of 0.38 miles (0.61 km) serves to connect Postelle to the state highway system via Highway 39.

Major intersections

The entire route is in Phillips County.

Location	mi	km	Destinations	Notes
Postelle	0.55	0.89	CR 643	Western terminus
	0.00	0.00	AR 39	Eastern terminus
1.000 mi = 1.609 km; 1.000 km = 0.621 mi

== See also ==
- List of state highways in Arkansas
