= Arkansas Highway 262 =

State highway in Arkansas, United States

Highway 262

Route information
- Maintained by ArDOT
- Length: 11.53 mi (18.56 km)
- Existed: December 9, 1959–present

Major junctions
- West end: AR 33 near Dixie
- East end: AR 33 near Gregory

Location
- Country: United States
- State: Arkansas
- Counties: Woodruff

Highway system
- Arkansas Highway System; Interstate; US; State; Business; Spurs; Suffixed; Scenic; Heritage
← AR 261	→ AR 263

Highway 262 (AR 262, Ark. 262, and Hwy. 262) is an east–west state highways in Woodruff County, Arkansas. The route is maintained by the Arkansas Department of Transportation (ARDOT).

== Route description ==
Highway 262 is located in the Western Lowlands Holocene Meander Belts ecoregion within the Mississippi Alluvial Plain, broad, nearly level, agriculturally-dominated alluvial plain with flat, clayey, poorly-drained soils commonly called the Arkansas Delta in the state.

No segment of Highway 262 has been listed as part of the National Highway System, a network of roads important to the nation's economy, defense, and mobility.

Highway 261 begins at Highway 33 near Dixie, an unincorporated community in western Woodruff County near the Cache River National Wildlife Refuge. The highway runs due west (though signed east) as a section line road across flat fields used for row crops, turning north at McClelland and passing a camp or lodge. The highway begins running north, roughly 1 mile (1.6 km) east of the White River, which also serves as the White County line. Highway 262 turns east and terminates at an intersection with Highway 33 north of Gregory.

The ARDOT maintains Highway 262 like all other parts of the state highway system. As a part of these responsibilities, the department tracks the volume of traffic using its roads in surveys using a metric called average annual daily traffic (AADT). ARDOT estimates the traffic level for a segment of roadway for any average day of the year in these surveys. As of 2017, AADT was estimated as 80 vehicles per day (VPD) near Dixie and 150 VPD near the eastern terminus. For reference, the American Association of State Highway and Transportation Officials (AASHTO), classifies roads with fewer than 400 vehicles per day as a very low volume local road.

== History ==
The Arkansas General Assembly passed the Act 148 of 1957, the Milum Road Act, creating 10–12 miles (16–19 km) of new state highways in each county. Under the Act, the highway was created along a county road between Dixie and McClelland by the Arkansas State Highway Commission on December 9, 1959. The route was extended north to Highway 33 on April 24, 1963, during a period of state highway system expansion.

== Major intersections ==
The entire route is in Woodruff County.

Location	mi	km	Destinations	Notes
	0.00	0.00	AR 33 – Gregory, Augusta	Western terminus
	11.53	18.56	AR 33 – Augusta	Eastern terminus
1.000 mi = 1.609 km; 1.000 km = 0.621 mi
