= Riceland Foods =

US-based rice and soybean marketing cooperative

Riceland Foods, Inc.
- Type: Agricultural & Manufacturing Cooperative
- Industry: Agriculture/Manufacturing/Grain Sales
- Founded: 1921
- Headquarters: Stuttgart, Arkansas, United States
- Area served: global
- Key people: Kevin McGilton (CEO) Roger Pohlner (Chairman)
- Products: Rice, soy, and grain byproducts
- Revenue: $1.3 billion (2022)
- Members: 6,000 farmer members
- Website: riceland.com

Riceland Foods, Inc. is a farmer-owned rice and soybean marketing cooperative with headquarters in Stuttgart, Arkansas, United States. The cooperative was founded in 1921 and has become a major rice and grain miller and a global marketer of the same. Approximately 5000 farmers own or deliver to the cooperative which operates six rice mills including the world's largest in Jonesboro, Arkansas. The cooperatives principal purpose is to utilize efficiencies of scale to generate increased farmer returns through receiving, storing, milling, packaging, and marketing rice, vegetable oil, meal and byproducts to markets around the globe.

== Cooperative Board of Directors ==
Riceland Foods is led by a Board of Directors elected by the Farmer member owners that deliver grain to the cooperative. In Dec. 9th 2021, they announced an intended $13.2 million expansion to the plan. As of 2021, they employed approximately 1,500 workers companywide.

== Leadership ==
Kevin McGilton was announced as the CEO of Riceland Foods, Inc. on December 8th, 2023.

== Sales as of fiscal year end July 31 ==
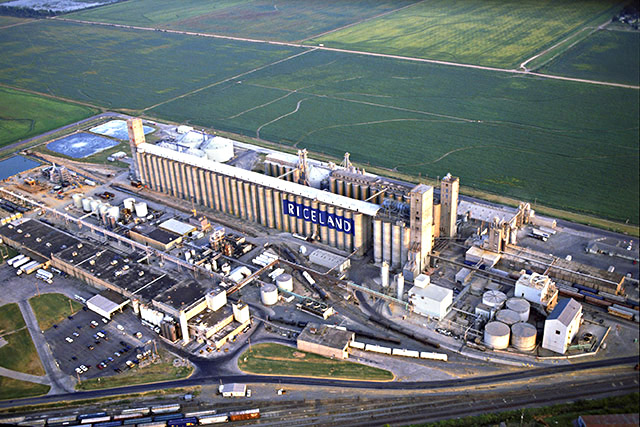
Riceland Foods, Inc., rice and soybean storage and processing facility

| Year | Revenue | Reference |
|---|---|---|
| 2007 | $947 M | |
| 2008 | $1.23 B | |
| 2009 | $1.30 B | |
| 2010 | $1.10 B | |
| 2011 | $1.10 B | |
| 2012 | $1.15 B | |
| 2013 | $1.32 B | |
| 2014 | $1.16 B | |
| 2015 | $1.12 B | |
| 2016 | $1.01 B | |
| 2017 | $941 M | |
| 2018 | $955 M | |
| 2019 | $980 M | |
| 2020 | $868 M | |
| 2021 | $995 M | |
| 2022 | $1.21 B | |
| 2023 | $980 M | |
| 2024 | | |

== Products and services ==
Riceland has been responsible for up to one-third (or more) of the total U.S. rice crop. Riceland also sells rice, oil & other grain products to food service distributors, wholesalers, export markets, and in many grocery stores.

Rice milling Riceland operates five rice mills and two parboiling plants with two major rice milling centers in Stuttgart and Jonesboro, Arkansas.

Grain storage Riceland has been listed as a Top 10 grain storage company in the United States.

Food service products Riceland supplies rice and oil products to the food service industry.

Edible oils Riceland's edible oil refinery at Stuttgart refines crude oils extracted from soybeans and rice bran into oil and shortening products. Corn, canola, peanut and cottonseed oils are also refined and blended.
