= Oren O'Neal =

American football player (born 1983)

No. 46
- Position: Fullback

Personal information
- Born: September 8, 1983 (age 43); Stuttgart, Arkansas, U.S.
- Listed height: 5 ft 11 in (1.80 m)
- Listed weight: 245 lb (111 kg)

Career information
- High school: Stuttgart
- College: Arkansas State
- NFL draft: 2007: 6th round, 175th overall pick

Career history
- Oakland Raiders (2007–2009)
- Stats at Pro Football Reference

Orenthal O'Neal (born September 8, 1983) is an American former professional football player who was a fullback for the Oakland Raiders of the National Football League (NFL). He played college football for the Arkansas State Red Wolves and was selected by the Oakland Raiders in the sixth round of the 2007 NFL draft.

== Early life ==
O'Neal attended Stuttgart High School in Stuttgart, Arkansas and was considered a hard-working student. He was a letterman in track and field athletics and football, including a two-time All-Conference selection for football where his primary position was offensive lineman.

== College career ==
O'Neal played collegiately at Arkansas State University for six years. After joining Arkansas State in 2001 as a walk-on, O'Neal was diagnosed with chylothorax and subsequently had part of his lung removed. He returned to the football team in 2002 and worked on getting stronger. Before the 2003 season, O'Neal earned a scholarship and was later granted a sixth year of eligibility by the NCAA. His story was told in 2006 by CBS SportsLine when he was chosen as "National Walk-On of the Year". In the article, he told of sleeping on friends' floors and doing anything else necessary to get by as a walk-on with very little money or resources.

O'Neal graduated from Arkansas State University with Bachelor of Science degrees in Manufacturing Industrial Engineering Technology and Technical Studies.

== Professional career ==
O'Neal was selected by the Raiders in the sixth round of the 2007 NFL draft with the 175th overall pick. He was named the rookie of the year by then-Raiders coach Lane Kiffin. He worked his way up the roster both on offense and special teams and played 14 games in 2007, recording one rushing attempt for one yard. O'Neal suffered a knee injury, which was initially thought to be possibly career-threatening, and was placed on injured reserve for the 2008 season on August 25. He was cut by the Raiders in April 2010.
