= Auvergne, Arkansas =

Community in Arkansas

Auvergne
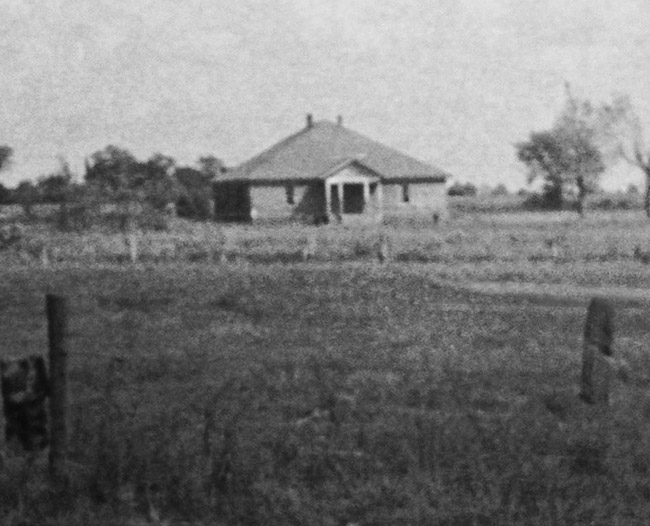
- Picture of the school house in Auvergne, Arkansas, taken in 1948.

- Map showing Auvergne in Arkansas
- Coordinates: 35.5143257°N 91.2301732°W
- Country: United States
- State: Arkansas
- County: Jackson County

Auvergne is a community in Jackson County, Arkansas, United States. The unincorporated town is located a couple miles southeast of Newport, Arkansas, on Arkansas Highway 17. The area is sparsely populated with a few houses on the main stretch of the highway surrounded by large swathes of farmland. The area was a hub of agriculture and timber industries. A graveyard is to the southeast.

== History ==
The town was settled in the 1830s, but it was not until the 1870s that the first formal settlement was created. Positioned between the White River and the Cache River, the town had a thriving timber industry during its heyday in the late 19th century. James T. Henderson, the “father of Auvergne,” moved and settled in the area with twenty-five slaves in 1860. By 1885, the Batesville and Brinkley Railroad had laid a railroad through the town.

During the years that followed, the town saw general prosperity and an increase in population. Up to thirteen sawmills were constructed in and around the town. The settlement had grown to include all the basic necessities of a small town. However, by 1905, the number of sawmills had dropped to five, and the population had also began to decline. In 1895, a tornado devastated the town, destroying the Methodist church, the railroad depot, and the schoolhouse. In addition to the destruction of the tornado, the establishment of Newport as the county seat caused greater population decline.

The post office was closed in 1966 due to the declining population of the town. Pickens Black Jr. owned a farm in the area and was the second African American pilot to be licensed to fly in the United States.

== Name ==
Local history records indicate that it was James T. Henderson's wife who picked the settlement’s name. Two stories have evolved for the origin of the name, one states that she had read a novel with the name, while another says that she saw the name on a barrel of flour.
