= Arkansas Highway 339 =

State highway in Woodruff County, Arkansas, United States

Highway 339

Route information
- Maintained by ArDOT
- Length: 0.745 mi (1,199 m)
- Existed: June 23, 1965–present

Major junctions
- North end: AR 33C in Augusta
- South end: CR 816

Location
- Country: United States
- State: Arkansas
- Counties: Woodruff

Highway system
- Arkansas Highway System; Interstate; US; State; Business; Spurs; Suffixed; Scenic; Heritage
← AR 338	→ AR 340

Highway 339 (AR 339 and Hwy. 339) is a short state highway in Woodruff County, Arkansas. The highway is maintained by the Arkansas Department of Transportation (ArDOT).

== Route description ==
AR 339 begins in Augusta, the small-town county seat of Woodruff County in the Arkansas Delta. (Note: Although Arkansas highways normally run from south to north and from west to east, the Woodruff County Route and Sections Map indicates that AR 339 begins at AR 33C and runs south.) The highway begins at a junction with AR 33 City (AR 33C, 6th Street / Gregory Street) in the south part of the city and runs due south to the Carl E. Bailey Generating Station near the White River, owned by the Woodruff Electric Cooperative. State maintenance ends just south of the driveway to the facility; the roadway continues south as County Road 618 (CR 618), a gravel road.

ArDOT maintains AR 339 like all other parts of the state highway system, including tracking the volume of traffic using its roads in surveys. As of 2020, traffic was estimated at 310 vehicles per day (VPD) on average. For reference, the American Association of State Highway and Transportation Officials (AASHTO), classifies roads with fewer than 400 VPD as a very low volume local road. No segment of AR 369 has been listed as part of the National Highway System, a network of roads important to the nation's economy, defense, and mobility.

== History ==
The Arkansas State Highway Commission created AR 369 on June 23, 1965, during a period of state highway system expansion; the alignment has not changed since creation.

== Major intersections ==
The entire route is in Woodruff County.

Location	mi	km	Destinations	Notes
	0.000	0.000	CR 816	Southern terminus; end of state maintenance
Augusta	0.745	1.199	AR 33C (6th Street / Gregory Street)	Northern terminus
1.000 mi = 1.609 km; 1.000 km = 0.621 mi
