= Palmer House (Blackton, Arkansas) =

Historic house in Arkansas, United States

- Formerly listed on the U.S. National Register of Historic Places
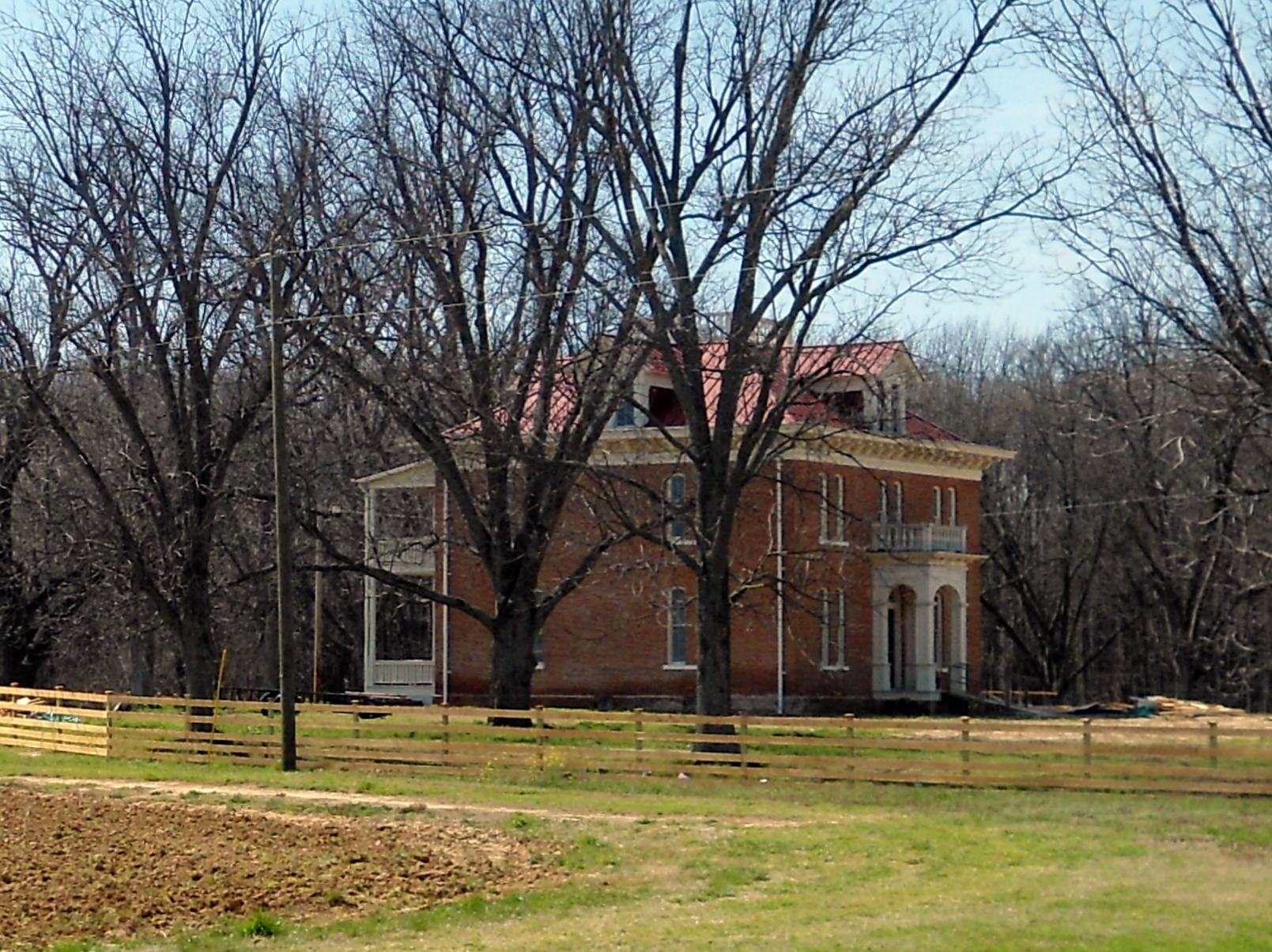
- Palmer House, March 2013

- Location within Arkansas Location within the United States
- Nearest city: Blackton, Arkansas
- Coordinates: 34°38′12″N 91°4′22″W
- Area: less than one acre
- Built: 1873
- NRHP reference No.: 76000436

Significant dates
- Added to NRHP: May 4, 1976
- Removed from NRHP: January 22, 2014

The Palmer House was a historic house in Blackton, Arkansas. The house was built from 1870 to 1873 by lawyer John C. Palmer, one of the most significant lawyers in Arkansas in the 19th century. The home featured arched windows and doors, dormers on all four sides of the roof, and a bracketed cornice; it was considered to be one of the best examples of period architecture. Palmer originally decorated the grounds of the house with a wide variety of flora; his dedication to the house led locals to refer to it as "Palmer's Folly". Palmer's grandson, also named John C. Palmer, last owned the home. On May 4, 1976, the Palmer House was added to the National Register of Historic Places.

On May 26, 2013, the Palmer House, after standing for over 140 years was destroyed by fire. The house was removed from the National Register on January 22, 2014.

== See also ==
- National Register of Historic Places listings in Monroe County, Arkansas
