= Stuttgart Public Schools =

School district in Arkansas, United States

Stuttgart School District

Location
- 2501 South Main Street, Stuttgart, Arkansas 72160; United States

District information
- Superintendent: Jeff McKinney
- NCES District ID: 0512960

Students and staff
- Students: 1,835
- Teachers: 134.35 (on FTE basis)
- Student–teacher ratio: 13.66

Other information
- Website: www.stuttgartschools.org

Stuttgart Public Schools (officially: Stuttgart School District) is the public school district for students of primary and secondary education in the Stuttgart, Arkansas and surrounding areas.

It includes the unincorporated areas of Casscoe and Lodge Corner.

The district's school board of education consists of seven members who establish policies for the four schools to operate. Since 1999, attendance in the district has ranged between 1,800 and 2,050 students each year. The district employs nearly 165 certified teachers and 92 support staff.

== History ==
In 1966 the Arkansas County School District dissolved, with portions going to the Stuttgart school district.

== Schools ==
Stuttgart Public Schools administers:

- Stuttgart High School — Grades 9-12
- Stuttgart Junior High — Grades 7-8
- Meekins Middle School — Grades 5-6
- Park Avenue Elementary School — Grades K-4
