= Arkansas Highway 302 =

State highway in Arkansas, United States

Highway 302

Route information
- Maintained by ArDOT
- Existed: April 24, 1963–present

Section 1
- Length: 2.994 mi (4.818 km)
- West end: AR 86 near Hazen
- East end: AR 249 near Hazen

Section 2
- Length: 3.189 mi (5.132 km)
- West end: AR 33 near DeValls Bluff
- East end: CR 218 / CR 222 near the Cache River National Wildlife Refuge

Section 3
- Length: 10.932 mi (17.593 km)
- West end: US 79B in Clarendon
- East end: AR 17 near Brinkley

Location
- Country: United States
- State: Arkansas
- Counties: Monroe, Prairie

Highway system
- Arkansas Highway System; Interstate; US; State; Business; Spurs; Suffixed; Scenic; Heritage
← AR 301	→ AR 303

Highway 302 (AR 302, Ark. 302, and Hwy. 302) is a designation for three east–west state highways in the Arkansas Grand Prairie. All three are low traffic rural highways. The first segment was created in 1963, with the other two added ten years later. One segment was part of the Trail of Tears and is preserved as an Arkansas Heritage Trail. All are maintained by the Arkansas Department of Transportation (ArDOT).

== Route description ==
=== Rural Prairie County ===
Highway 302 begins at Highway 86 in western Prairie County, a flat agricultural county in the Arkansas Delta. It runs due east as a section line road through agricultural fields, bridging Mitchell Branch and Mellon Branch and passing rural residences and outbuildings. Continuing east, the highway crosses an overflow branch of Barnes Creek before intersecting Highway 249. Highway 302 terminates at this junction, with Highway 249 continuing east and south.

=== Cache River ===
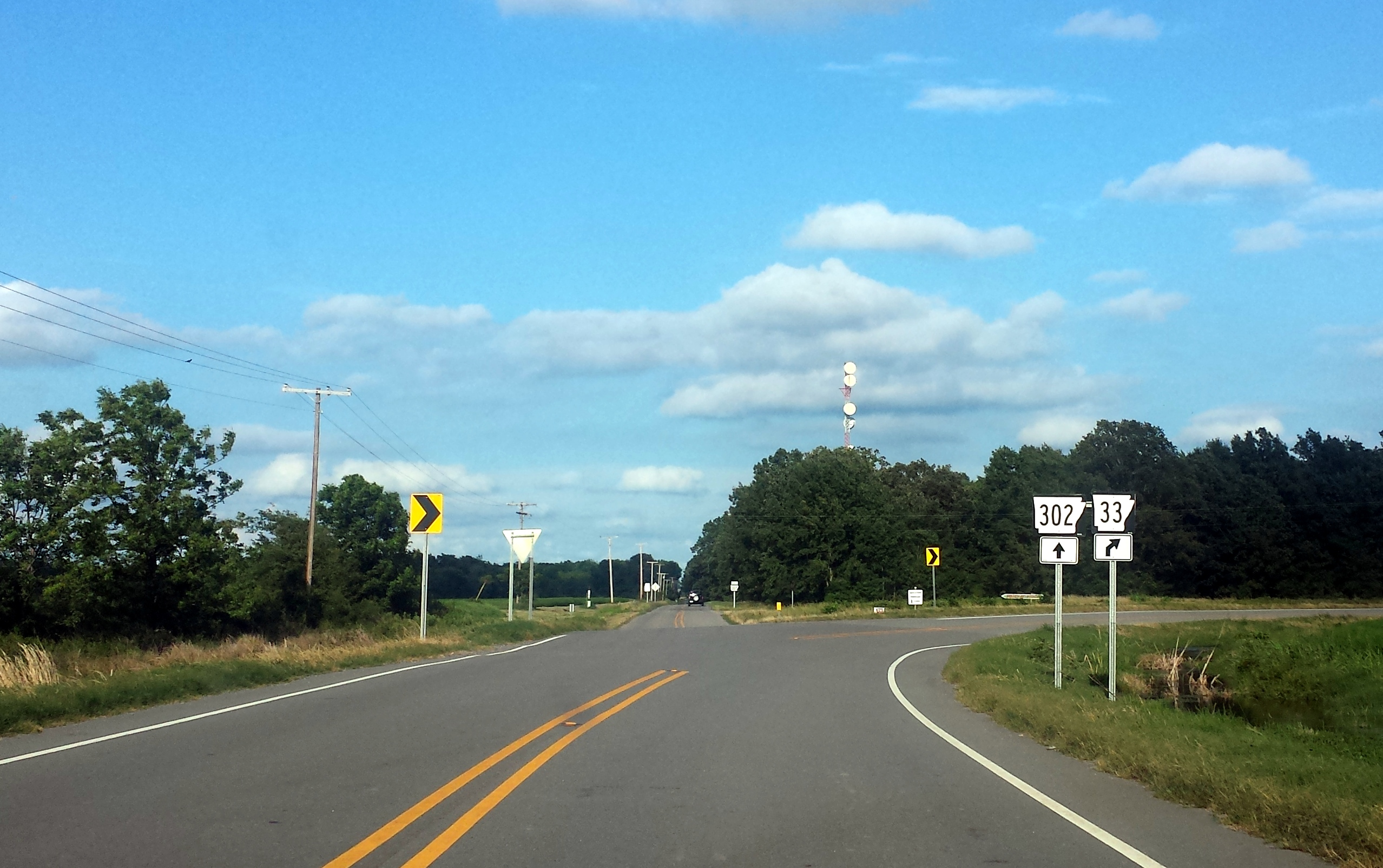
Eastern terminus of Highway 302

Highway 302 begins at Highway 33 in eastern Prairie County south of DeValls Bluff, one of the dual county seats. Though beginning in an agricultural area, the highway quickly enters the dense forests associated with the riparian buffer of the Cache River. State maintenance ends at an intersection with County Road 222 and Old Petty Lane near the Cache River National Wildlife Refuge, with the roadway continuing east as County Road 218.

=== Monroe County ===
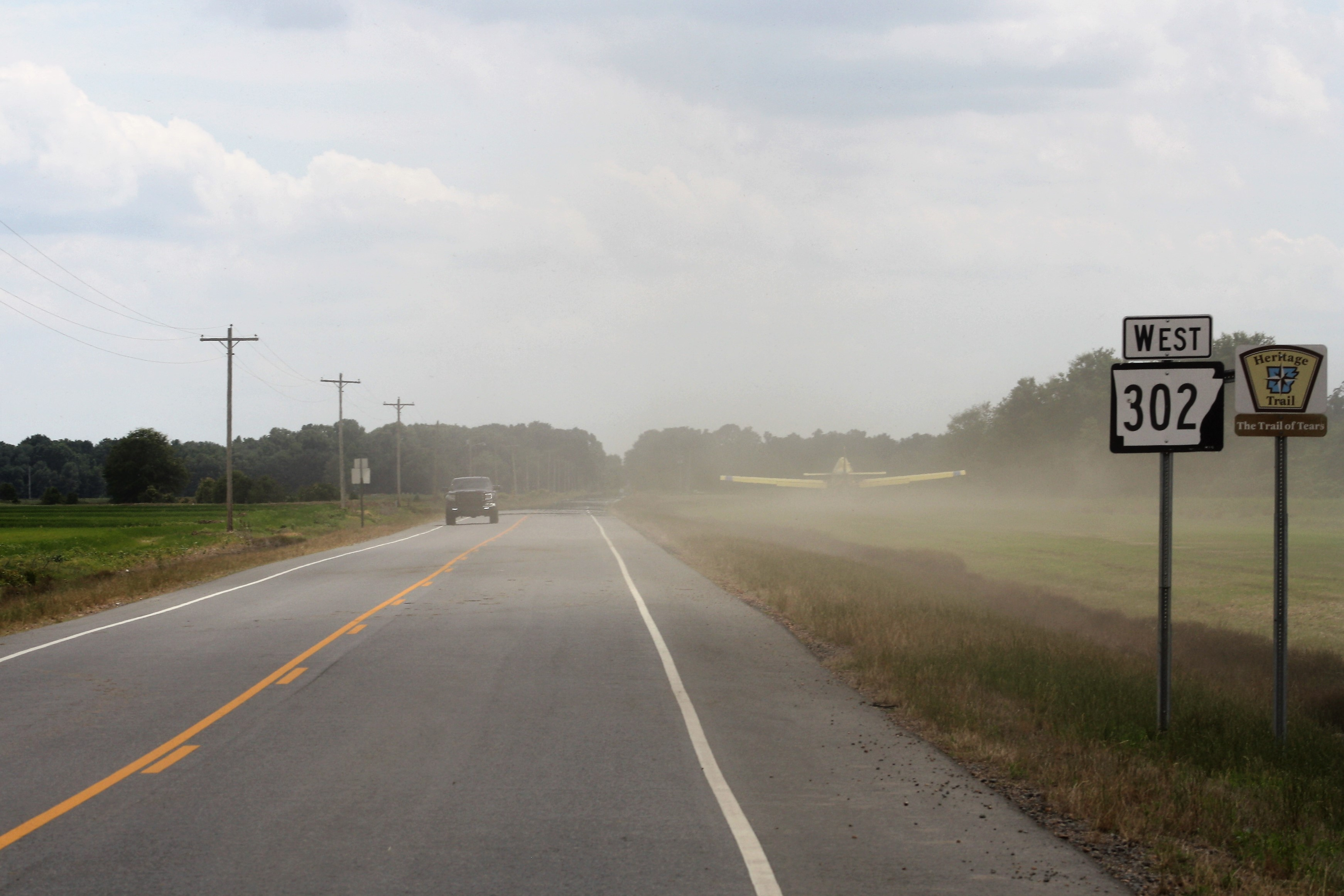
First Highway 302 reassurance marker south of the Highway 241 intersection

A third section of Highway 302 begins in Clarendon, the small-town county seat of Monroe County where the Cache River meets the White River. The route begins at US Highway 79 Business (US 79B, Madison Street) east of downtown near the St. Louis & San Francisco Railway tracks. Highway 302 runs north as 9th Street, passing the Clarendon High School and Harding Field, the Clarendon Lions high school football field. The highway turns north, exiting Clarendon and heading northward toward Brinkley, roughly paralleling the Cache River through sparsely populated agricultural lands. Shortly after passing through the unincorporated community of Dobbs Landing, Highway 302 intersects Highway 241. Highway 302 continues northward through Allendale to an intersection with Highway 17 just south of US 70, where it terminates.

== History ==
Highway 302 was created by the Arkansas State Highway Commission (ASHC) on April 24, 1963, east from Highway 33.

In 1973, the Arkansas General Assembly passed Act 9 of 1973. The act directed county judges and legislators to designate up to 12 miles (19 km) of county roads as state highways in each county. As a result of this legislation, the other two segments were created: in Prairie County and between Highway 241 and Highway 17 in Monroe County. The Monroe County segment later replaced Highway 241 south to Clarendon on January 26, 1977, to improve route continuity.

The segment between Clarendon and Highway 17 was part of the Trail of Tears, and is designated as an Arkansas Heritage Trail.

== Major intersections ==
County	Location	mi	km	Destinations	Notes
Prairie		0.00	0.00	AR 86	Western terminus
Prairie		2.994	4.818	AR 249	Eastern terminus
Prairie	Gap in route				
Prairie		0.000	0.000	AR 33 – Clarendon, DeValls Bluff	Western terminus
Prairie		3.189	5.132	CR 218 / CR 222	Eastern terminus
Gap in route
Monroe	Clarendon	0.00	0.00	US 79B (Madison Street)	Western terminus
Monroe		6.445	10.372	AR 241 north	AR 241 southern terminus
Monroe		10.932	17.593	AR 17	Eastern terminus
1.000 mi = 1.609 km; 1.000 km = 0.621 mi

== Sources ==
- "Minutes of the Meeting of the Arkansas State Highway Commission" (PDF). Little Rock: Arkansas State Highway Commission. 1953–1969. OCLC 21798861. Archived from the original (PDF) on October 1, 2018.
- "Minutes of the Meeting of the Arkansas State Highway Commission" (PDF). Little Rock: Arkansas State Highway Commission. 1970–1979. OCLC 21798861. Archived from the original (PDF) on November 5, 2011.
- "Minutes of the Meeting of the Arkansas State Highway Commission" (PDF). Little Rock: Arkansas State Highway Commission. 1980–1989. OCLC 21798861.
- "Minutes of the Meeting of the Arkansas State Highway Commission" (PDF). Little Rock: Arkansas State Highway Commission. 1990–1999. OCLC 21798861. Archived from the original (PDF) on July 21, 2019.
- "Minutes of the Meeting of the Arkansas State Highway Commission" (PDF). Little Rock: Arkansas State Highway Commission. 2000–2009. OCLC 21798861.
- "Minutes of the Meeting of the Arkansas State Highway Commission" (PDF). Little Rock: Arkansas State Highway Commission. 2010–2019. OCLC 21798861. Archived from the original (PDF) on March 4, 2016.
