= Arkansas Highway 249 =

State highway in Arkansas, United States

Highway 249

Route information
- Maintained by ArDOT
- Length: 8.725 mi (14.042 km)
- Existed: July 10, 1957–present

Major junctions
- West end: US 70 in Hazen
- East end: AR 11 near Hazen

Location
- Country: United States
- State: Arkansas
- Counties: Prairie

Highway system
- Arkansas Highway System; Interstate; US; State; Business; Spurs; Suffixed; Scenic; Heritage
← AR 248	→ AR 250

Highway 249 (AR 249, Ark. 249, and Hwy. 249) is a north–south state highway in Prairie County, Arkansas. The highway begins in Hazen and runs north through the central part of the county. The route is maintained by the Arkansas Department of Transportation (ArDOT).

== Route description ==
Highway 249 begins at U.S. Route 70 (US 70, South Front Street) in Hazen, a small city in the Grand Prairie ecoregion. The southern terminus is near the Railroad Prairie Natural Area, a former railroad right-of-way traveling through downtown Hazen that has been preserved by the Arkansas Natural Heritage Commission. It travels due north as a section line road, briefly traveling along the Hazen city limits. North of Hazen, the highway travels through a rural, agricultural, and aquaculture area, with a bridge over Hurricane Creek and an overpass over Interstate 40 (I-40), though no access is provided. North of I-40, AR 249 travels through Center Point and Tarnceville, two unincorporated communities, before an intersection with AR 302. Highway 249 turns east, with Highway 302 running west from the intersection. Continuing east, Highway 249 passes the Prairie County Fairgrounds before terminating at a junction with Highway 11 near the Wattensaw Wildlife Management Area.

== Major intersections ==
The entire route is in Prairie County.

Location	mi	km	Destinations	Notes
Hazen	0.00	0.00	US 70 (South Front Street) – DeValls Bluff, Carlisle	Southern terminus
	6.575	10.581	AR 302 west	AR 302 eastern terminus
	8.725	14.042	AR 11	Northern terminus
1.000 mi = 1.609 km; 1.000 km = 0.621 mi

== History ==
The highway was designated on July 10, 1957, by the Arkansas State Highway Commission. It was extended east to Highway 11 on June 29, 1960.
