= Postelle, Arkansas =

- Unincorporated community
- Postelle's position in Arkansas. Postelle, Arkansas (the United States)
- Coordinates: 34°34′12″N 91°1′24″W
- Country: United States
- State: Arkansas
- County: Phillips
- Township: Hicksville
- Elevation: 55 ft (17 m)
- Time zone: UTC-6 (Central (CST))
  - Summer (DST): UTC-5 (CDT)
- ZIP Code: 72383
- Area code: 870
- GNIS feature ID: 58415

Postelle is an unincorporated community in Hicksville Township, Phillips County, Arkansas, United States. The community has access to the Arkansas Highway System via Arkansas Highway 39S.
