= Keevil, Arkansas =

- Unincorporated community
- Location within Arkansas Location within the United States
- Coordinates: 34°47′17″N 91°14′38″W
- Country: United States
- State: Arkansas
- County: Monroe
- Elevation: 184 ft (56 m)
- Time zone: UTC-6 (Central (CST))
  - Summer (DST): UTC-5 (CDT)
- Area code: 870
- GNIS feature ID: 61170

Keevil is an unincorporated community in Monroe County, Arkansas, United States. Keevil is located on Arkansas Highway 17, 7.4 miles (11.9 km) south-southwest of Brinkley.

The Keevil depot on the St. Louis Southwestern Railway was at milepost 207.10 of the Jonesboro Sub-Division. Keevil boasted a 96-car capacity passing siding and had capacity for 13 other cars on additional trackage. The depot was abolished in 1951. The location of this depot was very close to the Arkansas Highway 241 crossing of the current Union Pacific rail line.
