= Orinthal Anderson =

American baseball player

- Outfielder
- Born: November 11, 1920; Hillsboro, Texas, U.S.
- Died: January 24, 1977 (aged 56); Miami, Florida, U.S.
- Batted: Left Threw: Right

Negro league baseball debut
- 1947, for the Birmingham Black Barons

Last appearance
- 1947, for the Birmingham Black Barons
- Stats at Baseball Reference

Teams
- Birmingham Black Barons (1947)

Orinthal Daniel "Andy" Anderson (November 11, 1920 – January 24, 1977) was an American professional baseball outfielder in the Negro leagues, Mexican League, and Minor League Baseball.

In 1946, he played for the Los Angeles White Sox and the Alijadores de Tampico, playing for Tampico again in 1948.

Anderson played with the Birmingham Black Barons in 1947.

From 1951 to 1957, he played for several minor league clubs, including in the Pittsburgh Pirates and Milwaukee Braves systems.
