= Roe, Arkansas =

- Town
- Location in Monroe County, Arkansas
- Coordinates: 34°37′52″N 91°23′09″W
- Country: United States
- State: Arkansas
- County: Monroe
- Established: 1968

Area
  - Total: 0.18 sq mi (0.46 km^{2})
  - Land: 0.18 sq mi (0.46 km^{2})
  - Water: 0 sq mi (0.00 km^{2})
- Elevation: 213 ft (65 m)

Population (2020)
  - Total: 68
  - Estimate (2025): 74 ▲
  - Density: 380.5/sq mi (146.91/km^{2})
- Time zone: UTC-6 (Central (CST))
  - Summer (DST): UTC-5 (CDT)
- ZIP code: 72134
- Area code: 870
- FIPS code: 05-60380
- GNIS feature ID: 2407234

Roe is a town in Monroe County, Arkansas, United States. Located at the junction of U.S. Route 79 and Arkansas Highway 33, the population was 68 at the 2020 census, down from 114 in 2010.

== History ==
Roe began as a railroad depot around 1880 on the Cotton Belt (officially the St. Louis Southwestern Railway). Originally located in Prairie County, a boundary adjustment in 1883 placed it in Monroe County. The small community saw new growth when U.S. Route 79 was constructed through the town in 1935. Roe was incorporated as a town in 1968.

== Geography ==
Roe is located in western Monroe County. Via U.S. Route 79, it is 14 miles (23 km) northeast of Stuttgart and 7 miles (11 km) southwest of Clarendon, the Monroe county seat.

According to the United States Census Bureau, the town has a total area of 0.18 square miles (0.47 km^{2}), all land. Roe is in the small portion of Monroe County that is west of the White River, and it is situated along the northern edge of the Grand Prairie in the Arkansas Delta.

=== Climate ===
The climate in this area is characterized by hot, humid summers and generally mild to cool winters. According to the Köppen Climate Classification system, Roe has a humid subtropical climate, abbreviated "Cfa" on climate maps.

== Demographics ==
Historical population
Census	Pop.	Note	%±
1970	127		—
1980	136		7.1%
1990	135		−0.7%
2000	124		−8.1%
2010	114		−8.1%
2020	68		−40.4%
2024 (est.)	74	▲	8.8%
U.S. Decennial Census

As of the census of 2000, there were 124 people, 50 households, and 36 families residing in the town. The population density was 252.0/km^{2} (636.5/mi^{2}). There were 56 housing units at an average density of 113.8/km^{2} (287.5/mi^{2}). The racial makeup of the town was 91.94% White, 7.26% Black or African American, and 0.81% from two or more races.

There were 50 households, out of which 34.0% had children under the age of 18 living with them, 60.0% were married couples living together, 6.0% had a female householder with no husband present, and 28.0% were non-families. 24.0% of all households were made up of individuals, and 10.0% had someone living alone who was 65 years of age or older. The average household size was 2.48 and the average family size was 2.92.

In the town, the population was spread out, with 25.8% under the age of 18, 3.2% from 18 to 24, 30.6% from 25 to 44, 26.6% from 45 to 64, and 13.7% who were 65 years of age or older. The median age was 39 years. For every 100 females, there were 106.7 males. For every 100 females age 18 and over, there were 114.0 males.

The median income for a household in the town was $38,750, and the median income for a family was $50,000. Males had a median income of $31,500 versus $33,125 for females. The per capita income for the town was $23,028. There were 6.7% of families and 9.0% of the population living below the poverty line, including 12.1% of under eighteens and 20.0% of those over 64.
