= Slovak, Arkansas =

- Unincorporated community
- Location within Arkansas Location within the United States
- Coordinates: 34°38′55″N 91°34′55″W
- Country: United States
- State: Arkansas
- County: Prairie
- Elevation: 220 ft (67 m)
- Time zone: UTC-6 (Central (CST))
  - Summer (DST): UTC-5 (CDT)
- Area code: 870
- GNIS feature ID: 54915

Slovak (originally known as Slovactown or Slovaktown) is an unincorporated community in Prairie County, Arkansas, United States. Slovak is located on Arkansas Highway 86 9.1 miles (14.6 km) south of Hazen. It is the only municipality in the United States named after the European country of Slovakia. The area was originally settled by Slovak immigrants and continues to celebrate its Slovak-American heritage.

== History ==
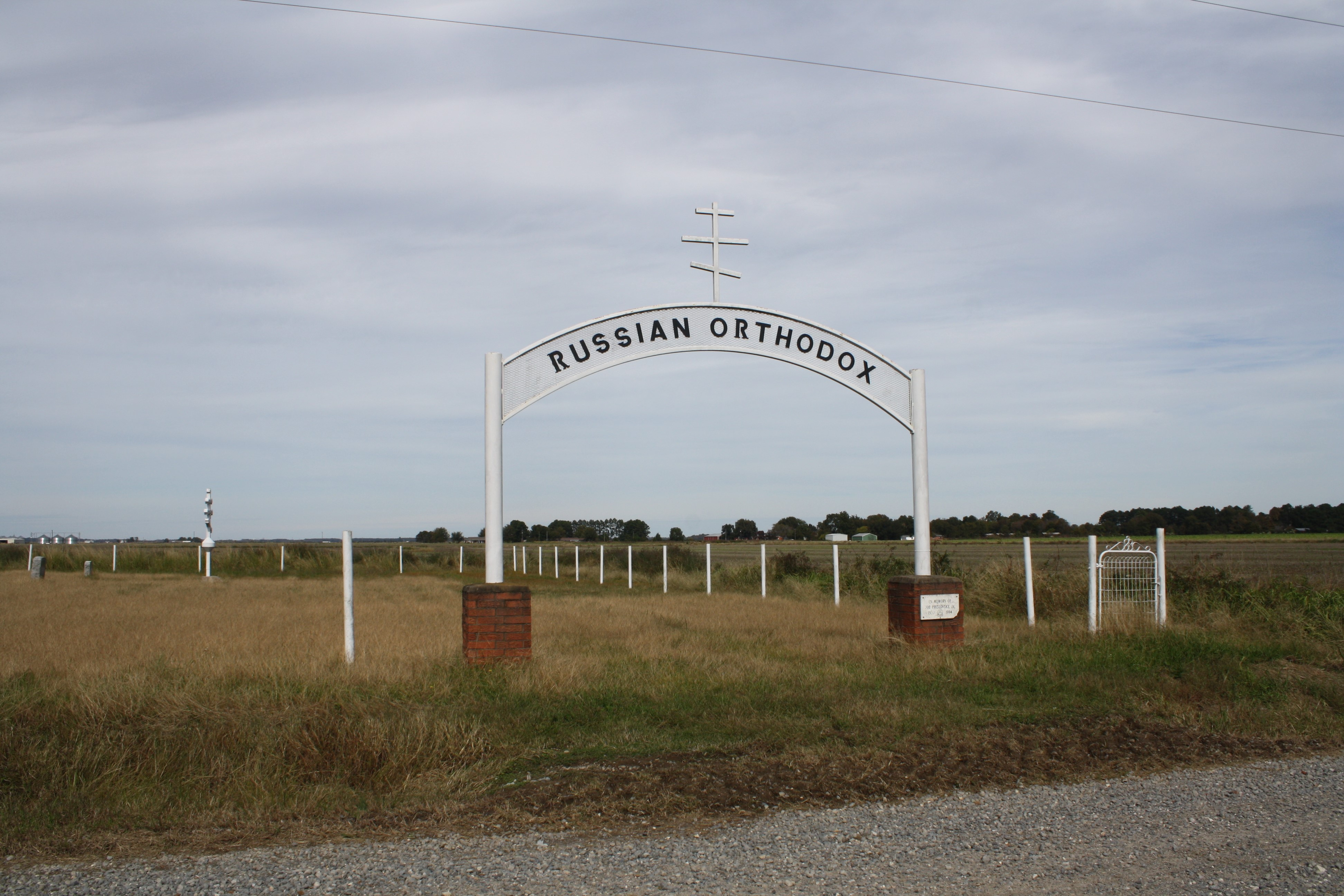
Russian Orthodox Cemetery near Slovak

The community was founded in 1894 and settled by Slovak immigrants who were drawn to the area when the Slovak Colonization Company in Pennsylvania bought 3,000 acres of land in Arkansas to colonize the area with Slovaks. There are still many Slovak cultural, fraternal and religious organizations in the community, and there is an annual Slovak Oyster Supper and other Slovak cultural events. The Church of Saints Cyril and Methodius (who are also known as the Apostles of the Slavs) was built in 1914 by the early Slovak immigrants.
