= Ethel, Arkansas =

- Unincorporated community
- Location within Arkansas Location within the United States
- Coordinates: 34°17′11″N 91°09′49″W
- Country: United States
- State: Arkansas
- County: Arkansas
- Elevation: 177 ft (54 m)
- Time zone: UTC-6 (Central (CST))
  - Summer (DST): UTC-5 (CDT)
- ZIP code: 72048
- Area code: 870
- GNIS feature ID: 48920

Ethel is an unincorporated community in Arkansas County, Arkansas, United States. Ethel is located on Arkansas Highway 17, 10 miles (16 km) east of DeWitt. Ethel has a post office with ZIP code 72048.

== Education ==
Residents are in the DeWitt School District. It operates DeWitt High School.
