= Stuttgart High School =

Location
- 1401 West 22nd Street; Stuttgart, Arkansas 72160; United States; 34°28′43″N 91°33′26″W

Information
- School type: Public comprehensive
- Status: Open
- School district: Stuttgart School District
- CEEB code: 042365
- NCES School ID: 051296001055
- Principal: Pam Dean
- Teaching staff: 39.10 (on an FTE basis)
- Grades: 7–12
- Enrollment: 501 (2023–2024)
- Student to teacher ratio: 12.81
- Education system: ADE Smart Core curriculum
- Classes offered: Regular, Advanced Placement (AP)
- Colors: Maroon and white
- Athletics conference: 4A Region 2
- Mascot: Ricebird
- Team name: Stuttgart Ricebirds
- Accreditation: ADE
- Feeder to: Stuttgart Junior High School
- Affiliation: Arkansas Activities Association
- Website: www.stuttgartschools.org/o/stuttgart-high-school

Stuttgart High School is a public secondary school for students in grades 7 through 12 located in Stuttgart, Arkansas. The high school is administered by the Stuttgart Public Schools. It is located at the intersection of 22nd Street and Buerkle Road.

Its attendance area includes the unincorporated area of Casscoe.

== Academics ==
Students follow the Smart Core curriculum developed by the Arkansas Department of Education (ADE). Students complete regular (core and career focus) courses and exams and may select Advanced Placement (AP) coursework and exams that provide an opportunity to receive college credit.

Since 1998, Stuttgart has participated in the EAST Initiative.

== Extracurricular activities ==
The Stuttgart High School mascot and athletic emblem is the Ricebird with maroon and white serving as the school colors.

=== Athletics ===
The Stuttgart Ricebirds compete in the 4A District 2 Conference in the 4A classification as administered by the Arkansas Activities Association in interscholastic activities and sports such as: football, basketball, baseball, golf, cheerleading, soccer, softball, track & field, bowling and tennis.

- Football: The Ricebirds football team are 8-time state football champions (1949, 1952, 1960 AP, 1970, 1975, 1982, 2002, 2012).
- Basketball: The boys basketball squad are 4-time state basketball champions (1914, 1915, 1992, 2009).

== Notable alumni ==
- David Walker, professional football defensive end
