= Monroe, Arkansas =

- Census-designated place
- Location within Arkansas Location within the United States
- Coordinates: 34°44′03″N 91°06′24″W
- Country: United States
- State: Arkansas
- Counties: Lee and Monroe

Area
  - Total: 0.73 sq mi (1.9 km^{2})
  - Land: 0.73 sq mi (1.9 km^{2})
  - Water: 0.0 sq mi (0 km^{2})
- Elevation: 190 ft (58 m)

Population (2020)
  - Total: 51
- Time zone: UTC-6 (Central (CST))
  - Summer (DST): UTC-5 (CDT)
- ZIP code: 72108
- Area code: 870
- GNIS feature ID: 2805661
- FIPS code: 05-46460

Monroe is an unincorporated community and census-designated place (CDP) in Monroe County, Arkansas, United States. The unincorporated community extends beyond the CDP slightly into Lee County. It was first listed as a CDP in the 2020 census with a population of 51.

Monroe is located at the junction of U.S. Route 79 and Arkansas Highway 39, 12 miles (19 km) east-northeast of Clarendon. Monroe has a post office with ZIP code 72108.

== Demographics ==
Historical population
Census	Pop.	Note	%±
2020	51		—
U.S. Decennial Census; 2020

=== 2020 census ===
Monroe CDP, Arkansas – Racial and ethnic composition Note: the US Census treats Hispanic/Latino as an ethnic category. This table excludes Latinos from the racial categories and assigns them to a separate category. Hispanics/Latinos may be of any race.
Race / Ethnicity (NH = Non-Hispanic)	Pop 2020	% 2020
White alone (NH)	36	70.59%
Black or African American alone (NH)	9	17.65%
Native American or Alaska Native alone (NH)	0	0.00%
Asian alone (NH)	0	0.00%
Pacific Islander alone (NH)	0	0.00%
Some Other Race alone (NH)	1	1.96%
Mixed Race or Multi-Racial (NH)	2	3.92%
Hispanic or Latino (any race)	3	5.88%
Total	51	100.00%
