= La Grue Bayou =

Stream in Arkansas County, Arkansas, U.S.

Coordinates: 34.2700°N 91.2300°W

La Grue Bayou is a stream in Arkansas County, Arkansas, in the United States.

La Grue is derived from the French meaning "the crane".

== See also ==
- List of rivers of Arkansas
