= Van, Arkansas =

- Unincorporated community
- Van's position in Arkansas. Van, Arkansas (the United States)
- Coordinates: 34°19′36″N 91°14′03″W
- Country: United States
- State: Arkansas
- County: Arkansas
- Township: Prairie
- Elevation: 180 ft (55 m)
- Time zone: UTC-6 (Central (CST))
  - Summer (DST): UTC-5 (CDT)
- GNIS feature ID: 57219

Van, Arkansas is an unincorporated community in Arkansas County, Arkansas, United States. The community is located on Arkansas Highway 153.
