= Turner, Phillips County, Arkansas =

Turner, Arkansas
- Unincorporated community
- Turner's position in Arkansas. Turner, Arkansas (the United States)
- Coordinates: 34°28′34.4″N 91°1′7.4″W
- Country: United States
- State: Arkansas
- County: Phillips
- Township: Cypress
- Elevation: 53 ft (16 m)
- Time zone: UTC-6 (Central (CST))
  - Summer (DST): UTC-5 (CDT)
- ZIP Code: 72383
- Area code: 870
- GNIS feature ID: 58771

Turner is an unincorporated community in Cypress Township, Phillips County, Arkansas, United States. The community is located at the intersection of Arkansas Highway 316 and the end of a concurrency between Arkansas Highway 1/Arkansas Highway 39. Home to the famous store and the Turner Boy Association

== See also ==
- Turner Historic District, on the National Register of Historic Places listings in Phillips County, Arkansas
