= Blackton, Arkansas =

- Unincorporated community
- Location within Arkansas Location within the United States
- Coordinates: 34°40′03″N 91°06′15″W
- Country: United States
- State: Arkansas
- County: Monroe
- Elevation: 180 ft (55 m)
- Time zone: UTC-6 (Central (CST))
  - Summer (DST): UTC-5 (CDT)
- Area code: 870
- GNIS feature ID: 76371

Blackton is an unincorporated community in Monroe County, Arkansas, United States. According to The Encyclopedia of Arkansas History and Culture, "little remains of the town." Two nationally registered historic sites are located in or near Blackton. The Palmer House is a brick home built in 1873 located near Blackton that has been listed on the National Register of Historic Places. The location where the survey of lands acquired in the Louisiana Purchase is located two miles outside of Blackton, now known as Louisiana Purchase State Park, and has been listed as a National Historic Landmark.

Blackton was incorporated on December 10, 1892.

The unoccupied Palmer House was destroyed by fire in 2014 while being restored.
