= Casscoe, Arkansas =

- Unincorporated community
- Casscoe's position in Arkansas. Casscoe, Arkansas (the United States)
- Coordinates: 34°31′32″N 91°19′33″W
- Country: United States
- State: Arkansas
- County: Arkansas
- Elevation: 203 ft (62 m)
- Time zone: UTC-6 (Central (CST))
  - Summer (DST): UTC-5 (CDT)
- ZIP code: 72026
- Area code: 870
- GNIS feature ID: 76546

Casscoe (also Cassco or Cass Coe) is an unincorporated community in Arkansas County, Arkansas, United States. The community is located where Arkansas Highway 33 Spur diverges from Arkansas Highway 33.

== Climate ==
The climate in this area is characterized by hot, humid summers and generally mild to cool winters. According to the Köppen Climate Classification system, Casscoe has a humid subtropical climate, abbreviated "Cfa" on climate maps.

== Education ==
Residents are in the Stuttgart School District. It operates Stuttgart High School.
