= Stuttgart, Arkansas =

City in Arkansas, United States

- City
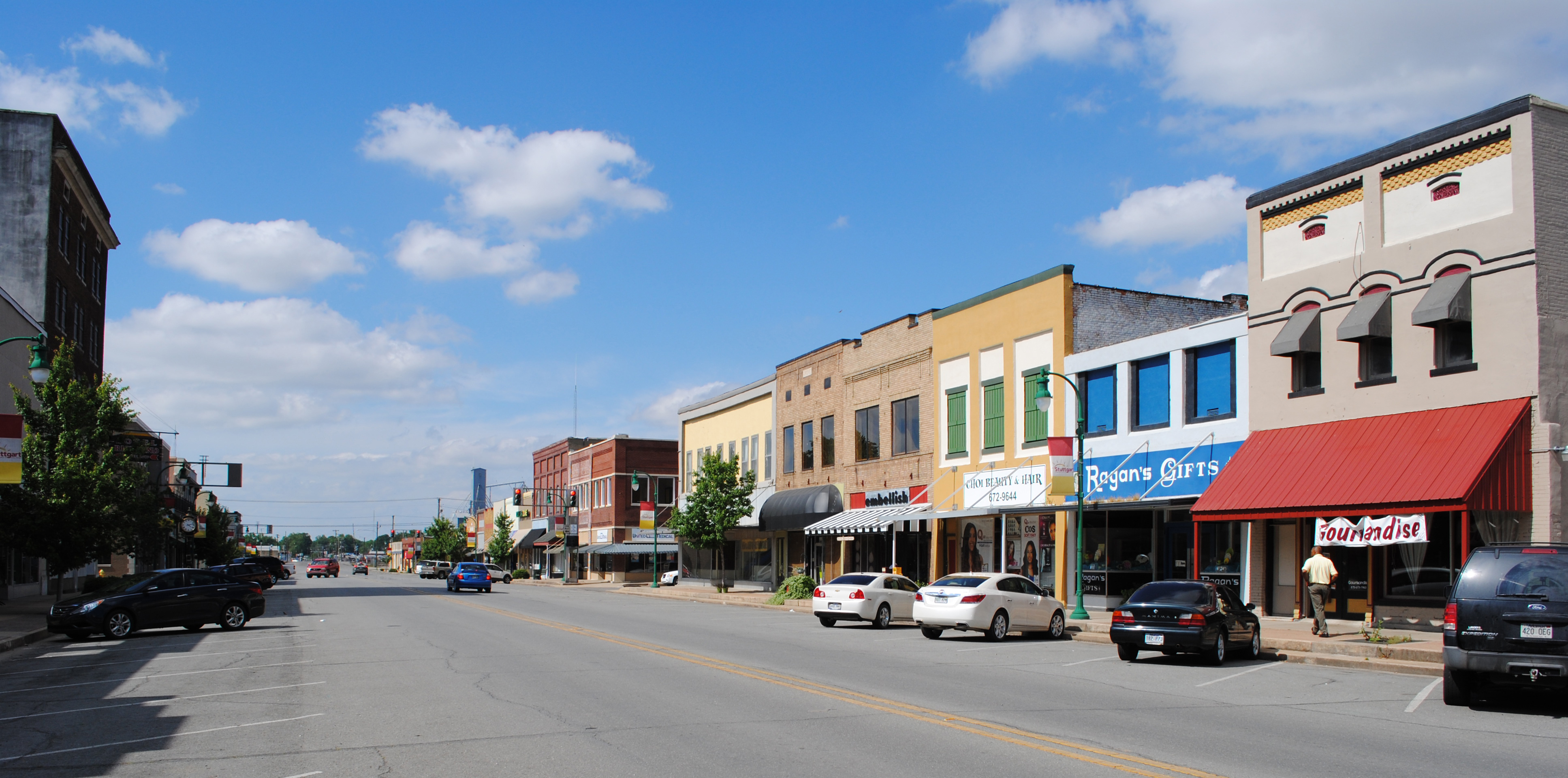
- Downtown Stuttgart

- Logo
- Nickname: "Rice and Duck Capital of the World"
- Motto: "A Natural Place To Call Home"
- Location of Stuttgart in Arkansas County, Arkansas.

- Location in the United States
- Coordinates: 34°30′15″N 91°32′46″W
- Country: United States
- State: Arkansas
- County: Arkansas
- Townships: Gum Pond, Morris
- Founded: April 30, 1880
- Incorporated: April 19, 1889
- Founder: Adam Bürkle
- Named for: Stuttgart, Germany

Government
  - Type: Mayor–Council
  - Mayor: Norma Strabala (I)
  - Council: City Council

Area
  - Total: 7.41 sq mi (19.20 km^{2})
  - Land: 7.41 sq mi (19.20 km^{2})
  - Water: 0 sq mi (0.00 km^{2})
- Elevation: 217 ft (66 m)

Population (2020)
  - Total: 8,264
  - Estimate (2025): 7,525 ▼
  - Density: 1,114.8/sq mi (430.43/km^{2})
- Time zone: UTC-6 (Central (CST))
  - Summer (DST): UTC-5 (CDT)
- ZIP code: 72160
- Area code: 870
- FIPS code: 05-67490
- GNIS feature ID: 2405537
- Website: stuttgartar.com

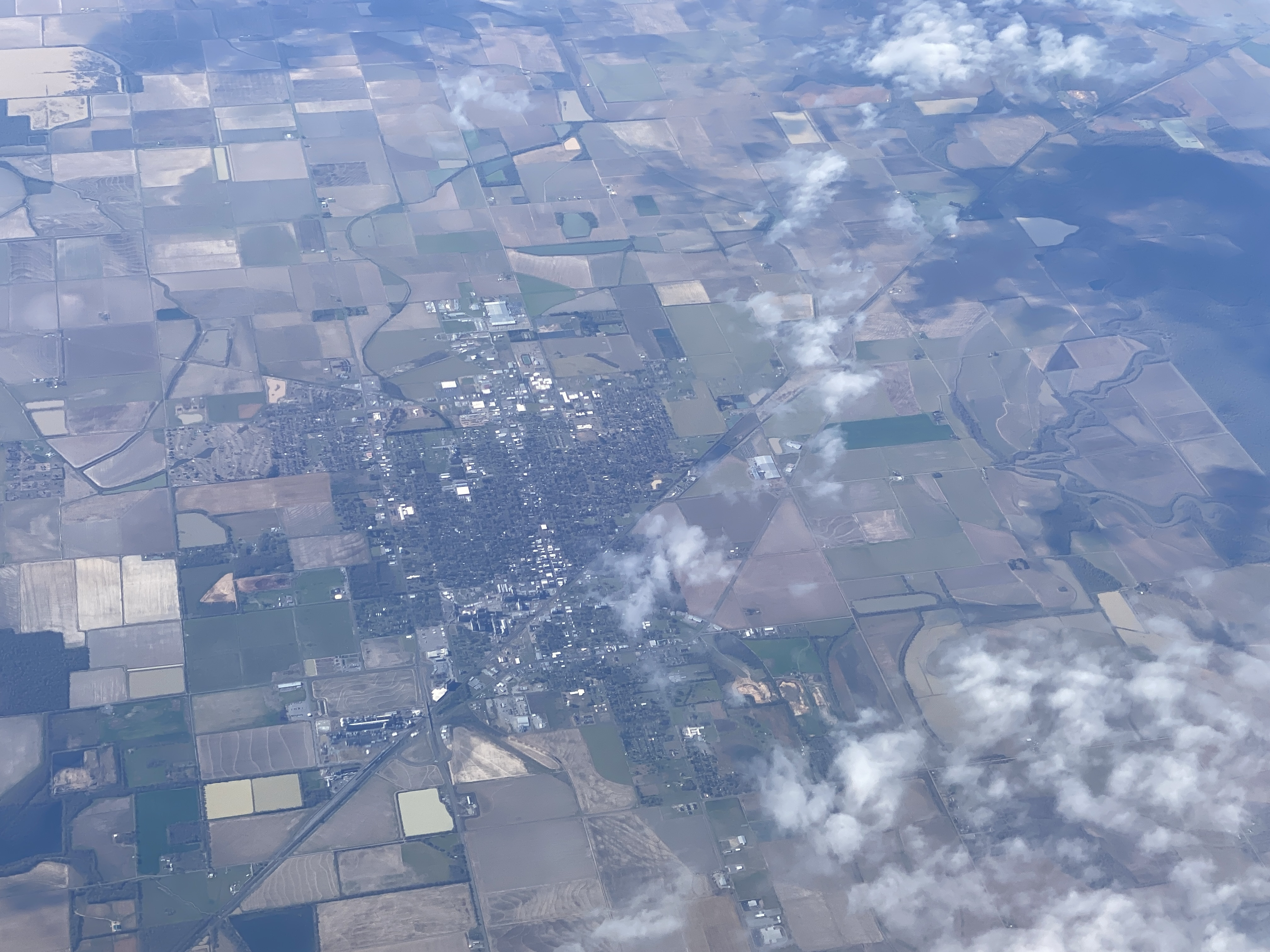
Aerial view of Stuttgart (2022)

Stuttgart is a city in and the county seat of the northern district of Arkansas County, Arkansas, United States. As of the 2020 census, Stuttgart had a population of 8,264.

Known as the "Rice and Duck Capital of the World", Stuttgart is an international destination for waterfowl hunting along the Mississippi Flyway. Founded in 1880, it was named for Stuttgart, Germany. Stuttgart is situated on the Arkansas Grand Prairie, a region known for rice cultivation. The economy is largely based on agricultural production, waterfowl tourism, and supporting industries.

It is located on U.S. Route 165, approximately 45 miles (72 km) southeast of Little Rock; and on U.S. Route 79 approximately 110 miles southwest of Memphis, Tennessee. Stuttgart is also on the Union Pacific Railroad between Memphis, Tennessee, and Pine Bluff, Arkansas.

== History ==
Stuttgart was founded by The Reverend Adam Bürkle of Plattenhardt, Württemberg (present-day Germany). He moved to the United States in 1852 and founded a settlement at Gum Pond after living for a time in Ohio. On April 30, 1880, Bürkle opened a post office and thus had to name the village. In honor of his homeland, he named it Stuttgart. In 1882, the Texas and St. Louis railroad was opened. Stuttgart was incorporated on April 19, 1889, and in 1904, rice farming was first introduced in the Stuttgart region. It became a dual county seat in Arkansas County with DeWitt in the 1920s.

== Geography ==
Stuttgart and Arkansas County are located in the Arkansas Delta (in Arkansas, usually referred to as "the Delta") a subregion of the Mississippi Alluvial Plain, which is a flat area consisting of rich, fertile sediment deposits from the Mississippi River between Louisiana and Illinois.

Within the Delta, Arkansas County is almost entirely within the Grand Prairie subregion, historically a flat grassland plain underlain by an impermeable clay layer (the Stuttgart soil series). Prior to the 19th century, flatter areas with slowly to very slowly permeable soils (often containing fragipans) supported Arkansas's largest prairie, covered in prairie grasses and forbs, with oaks covering the low hills and ridges, and pockets of floodplains with bottomland hardwood forests. This region was a sharp contrast to the bottomland forests that once dominated other parts of the Mississippi Alluvial Plain. Cropland has now largely replaced the native vegetation. Distinctively, rice is the main crop; soybeans, cotton, corn, and wheat are also grown. The rice fields provide habitat and forage for large numbers and many species of waterfowl; duck and goose hunting occurs at this important spot along the Mississippi Flyway. Stuttgart is the most important city within the Grand Prairie region.

According to the United States Census Bureau, the city has a total area of 7.2 square miles (18.7 km^{2}), all land.

=== Climate ===
The climate in this area is characterized by hot, humid summers and generally mild to cool winters. According to the Köppen Climate Classification system, Stuttgart has a humid subtropical climate, abbreviated "Cfa" on climate maps.

Climate data for Stuttgart, AR
Month	Jan	Feb	Mar	Apr	May	Jun	Jul	Aug	Sep	Oct	Nov	Dec	Year
Mean daily maximum °F (°C)	51 (11)	56 (13)	64 (18)	74 (23)	82 (28)	89 (32)	91 (33)	91 (33)	85 (29)	75 (24)	62 (17)	53 (12)	73 (23)
Mean daily minimum °F (°C)	35 (2)	38 (3)	45 (7)	54 (12)	63 (17)	71 (22)	73 (23)	71 (22)	64 (18)	54 (12)	44 (7)	38 (3)	54 (12)
Average precipitation inches (mm)	3.5 (89)	3.9 (99)	5.3 (130)	5.1 (130)	4.8 (120)	3.4 (86)	3.1 (79)	2.7 (69)	2.1 (53)	3.9 (99)	4.5 (110)	5.1 (130)	47.4 (1,194)
Average snowfall inches (cm)	1.8 (4.6)	1.7 (4.3)	0.5 (1.3)	0 (0)	0 (0)	0 (0)	0 (0)	0 (0)	0 (0)	0 (0)	0.2 (0.51)	0.3 (0.76)	4.5 (11.47)
Average precipitation days	6	6	7	6	7	6	5	4	5	5	6	6	6
Average snowy days	0	0	0	0	0	0	0	0	0	0	0	0	0
Source: NOAA

== Demographics ==
Historical population
Census	Pop.	Note	%±
1910	2,740		—
1920	4,522		65.0%
1930	4,927		9.0%
1940	5,628		14.2%
1950	7,276		29.3%
1960	9,661		32.8%
1970	10,477		8.4%
1980	10,941		4.4%
1990	10,420		−4.8%
2000	9,745		−6.5%
2010	9,326		−4.3%
2020	8,264		−11.4%
2025 (est.)	7,525	▼	−8.9%
U.S. Decennial Census

=== 2020 census ===
Stuttgart racial composition
Race	Number	Percentage
White (non-Hispanic)	4,280	51.79%
Black or African American (non-Hispanic)	3,145	38.06%
Native American	17	0.21%
Asian	70	0.85%
Pacific Islander	7	0.08%
Other/Mixed	338	4.09%
Hispanic or Latino	407	4.92%

As of the 2020 census, Stuttgart had a population of 8,264. The median age was 40.5 years. 24.1% of residents were under the age of 18 and 18.9% of residents were 65 years of age or older. For every 100 females there were 90.8 males, and for every 100 females age 18 and over there were 87.8 males age 18 and over.

97.6% of residents lived in urban areas, while 2.4% lived in rural areas.

There were 3,553 households and 2,197 families in Stuttgart, of which 30.1% had children under the age of 18 living in them. Of all households, 35.9% were married-couple households, 21.4% were households with a male householder and no spouse or partner present, and 36.1% were households with a female householder and no spouse or partner present. About 34.9% of all households were made up of individuals and 15.5% had someone living alone who was 65 years of age or older.

There were 4,104 housing units, of which 13.4% were vacant. The homeowner vacancy rate was 3.4% and the rental vacancy rate was 11.2%.

=== 2010 census ===
As of the 2010 United States census, there were 9,326 people living in the city. 58.7% were White, 36.5% African American, 0.2% Native American, 0.7% Asian, 2.4% from other races and 1.4% from two or more races. 3.5% were Hispanic or Latino of any race.

=== 2000 census ===
As of the census of 2000, there were 9,745 people, 3,994 households, and 2,731 families living in the city. The population density was 1,583.0 inhabitants per square mile (611.2/km^{2}). There were 4,384 housing units at an average density of 712.2 per square mile (275.0/km^{2}). The racial makeup of the city was 64.0% white or Caucasian, 34.5% black or African American, 0.6% Asian, 0.01% Pacific Islander, 0.2% Native American, 0.2% from other races, and 0.5% from two or more races. 0.8% of the population were Hispanic or Latino of any race.

There were 3,994 households, out of which 31.6% had children under the age of 18 living with them, 48.0% were married couples living together, 16.7% had a female householder with no husband present, and 31.6% were non-families. 28.4% of all households were made up of individuals, and 12.6% had someone living alone who was 65 years of age or older. The average household size was 2.40 and the average family size was 2.94.

In the city, the population was spread out, with 26.0% under the age of 18, 8.8% from 18 to 24, 26.0% from 25 to 44, 23.0% from 45 to 64, and 16.2% who were 65 years of age or older. The median age was 38 years. For every 100 females, there were 86.8 males. For every 100 females age 18 and over, there were 81.2 males.

The median income for a household in the city was $31,664, and the median income for a family was $39,126. Males had a median income of $30,860 versus $21,817 for females. The per capita income for the city was $16,490. About 13.8% of families and 18.2% of the population were below the poverty line, including 25.7% of those under age 18 and 17.3% of those age 65 or over.

== Economy ==
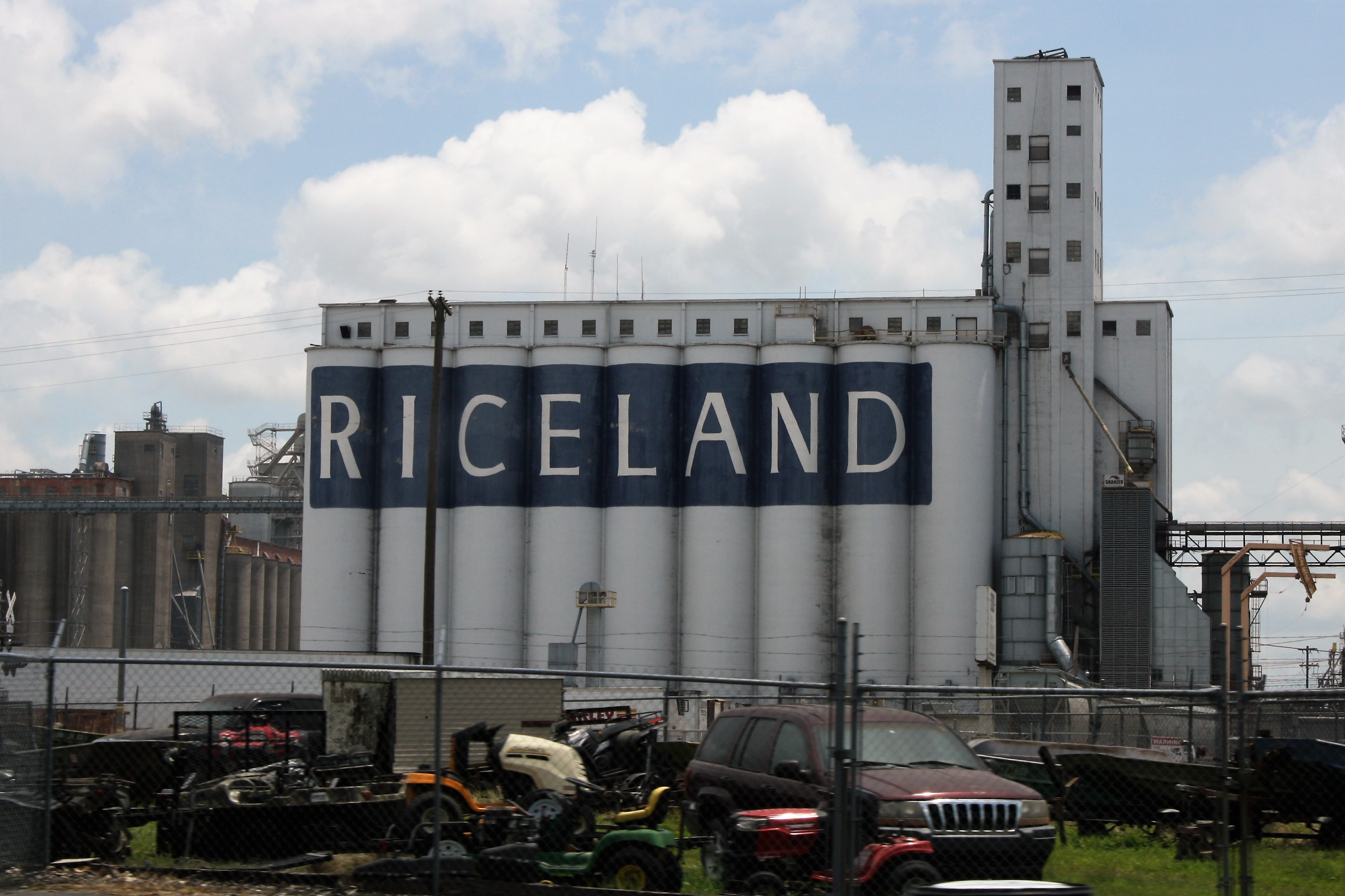
Riceland grain storage in Stuttgart

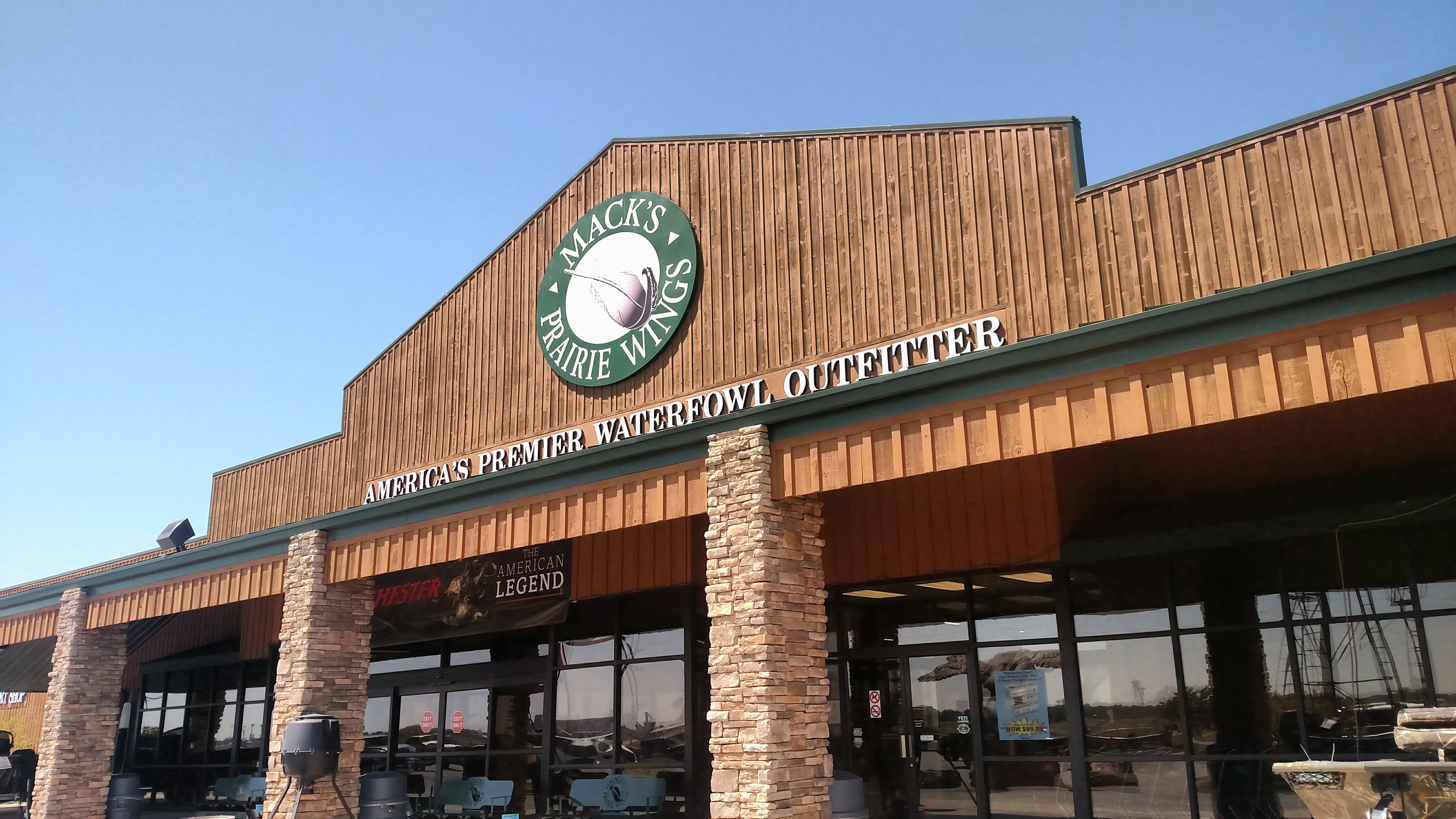
Mack's Prairie Wings

Stuttgart is home to Mack's Prairie Wings, known around the world as the premier waterfowl sports outfitter, through their store and online presence. During the third week in November (Thanksgiving Week), Stuttgart holds the World Championship Duck Calling Contest that brings in people of all ages from around the world to show off their talent using a duck call.

Riceland Foods, a farmer-owned agricultural marketing cooperative and world's largest miller and marketer of rice, is headquartered in Stuttgart.

Producers Rice Mill, another farmer-owned agricultural marketing cooperative that is also among the largest millers and marketers of rice is also headquartered in Stuttgart.

Lennox Industries - Stuttgart has a Lennox Air Conditioner factory.

Stratton Seed - Stuttgart is home to Stratton Seed, a large marketer of soybeans and soybean seed.

Layne Arkansas - Stuttgart is home to Layne Arkansas, a business that installs water pumping wells to irrigate farms, and also installs city water systems.

Baptist Hospital - Stuttgart also has a branch of the Baptist Hospital Group which serves a large part of Arkansas. The Stuttgart Baptist Hospital is a central hospital for much of the surrounding region - - Arkansas County, Prairie County, Monroe County, Western Phillips, Northern Jefferson County, and Eastern Lonoke County. It is one of the largest employers in Stuttgart.

The University of Arkansas' Dale Bumpers Rice Research Center, about seven miles east of Stuttgart, employs a team of scientific researchers who breed new varieties of rice, and is one of the biggest employers in the area.

Delta Plastics of the South is a manufacturer of plastic irrigation tubes used for watering crops. These tubes are a replacement for more rigid plastic or aluminum pipe systems that used to be used to irrigate. One of Delta Plastics' manufacturing plants is located in Stuttgart, and is a big employer in the area.

== Education ==
Public education for elementary and secondary school students is provided by Stuttgart Public Schools, which leads to graduation from Stuttgart High School.

Stuttgart also has Saint John's Lutheran Elementary School, and Holy Rosary Catholic Elementary School (of the Roman Catholic Diocese of Little Rock), and Grand Prairie Christian School.

Stuttgart also has a branch of Phillips County Community College, a two-year junior college (that also has campuses in Helena and DeWitt), which is part of the University of Arkansas System.

Stuttgart College (also known as Stuttgart Training School and Stuttgart Normal School) operated in the city from 1889 to 1915. The institution had various affiliations, from local control to the Methodist Episcopal Church, South alongside Henderson State University and Hendrix College, and later the United Presbyterian Church, when it was affiliated with Monmouth College and Tarkio College. The school brought many well-educated professors to the small frontier town and served as an early regional center of education in the Grand Prairie, including many of the Grand Prairie's leading citizens during early settlement. The institution failed due to a lack of financial support and the opening of Stuttgart High School in 1912.

== Arts and culture ==
Stuttgart is home to the Museum of the Arkansas Grand Prairie which has displays celebrating the history of Stuttgart, and the surrounding Grand Prairie area.

The Grand Prairie Center on the campus of Phillips County Community College in Stuttgart brings in performances by live bands, and stage plays a handful of times each year.

=== Annual cultural events ===
There is an annual Wings Over The Prairie Festival every November, from Wednesday through Saturday, during Thanksgiving week. The festival features the World's Championship Duck Calling Contest, carnival rides, craft tents, and a Queen Mallard Pageant, all celebrating duck hunting which is Stuttgart's biggest tourist attraction.

There is an annual German Heritage Festival.

There is also an annual Arts Festival held in the Grand Prairie Center on the campus of Phillips County Community College in Stuttgart.

== Infrastructure ==
=== Healthcare ===
Stuttgart and the surrounding area are served by Baptist Health Medical Center-Stuttgart, a 49-bed acute care facility. The facility originally opened in 1957 under the name Stuttgart Memorial Hospital, then became Stuttgart Regional Medical Center. It took its current name in 2007 when it became part of the Baptist Health System based in Little Rock, Arkansas.

=== Transportation ===
Stuttgart is located at the intersection of three north-south United States highways: US Highway 63 (US 63), US 79, and US 165. The city is also served by US 79 Business (US 79B), Highway 130 (AR 130), AR 146 Spur (AR 146S), and AR 276.

The Stuttgart Municipal Airport is a general aviation airport located 8 miles (13 km) north of the city in Prairie County.

== In popular culture ==
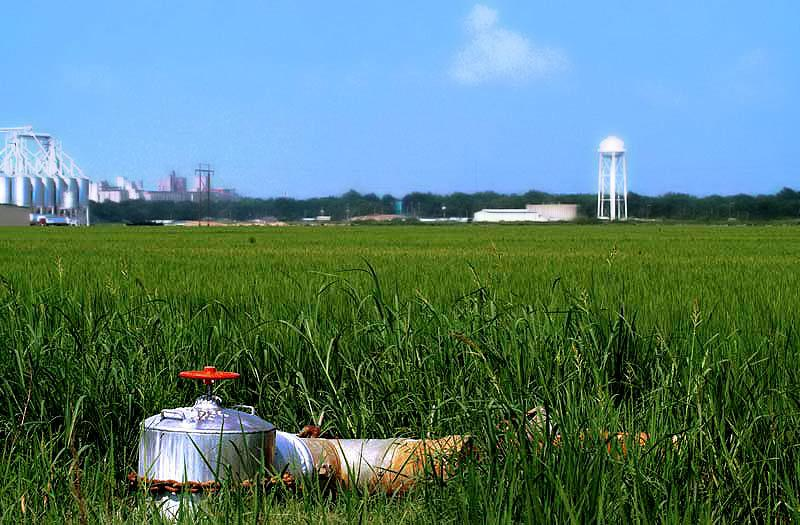
Rural Stuttgart, looking toward town

The 1989 movie Rosalie Goes Shopping, directed by Percy Adlon and starring Marianne Sägebrecht, was set in Stuttgart.

Some scenery in Stuttgart appears in the 2007 movie Shotgun Stories, starring Michael Shannon, directed by Jeff Nichols, which was also filmed in England, Arkansas and North Little Rock.

Some scenery in Stuttgart also appears in the 2012 movie Mud starring Matthew McConaughey and Reese Witherspoon, and directed by Jeff Nichols. Mud was also filmed around DeWitt, Dumas, and Casscoe.

== Notable people ==
- Marion Berry, U.S. representative from Arkansas
- Douglas A. Blackmon, Pulitzer Prize-winning author of Slavery by Another Name, born in Stuttgart
- LeAnne Burch, Arkansas politician
- Fonda Hawthorne, Democratic member of the Arkansas House of Representatives from Little River County; born in Stuttgart in 1956
- Oren O'Neal, Former NFL Fullback; Oakland Raiders Team Rookie of the Year 2007.
- Luke Owens, Former NFL Defensive Tackle; Baltimore Colts, Chicago/St. Louis Cardinals

== See also ==
- List of municipalities in Arkansas
- National Register of Historic Places listings in Arkansas County, Arkansas
