= National Register of Historic Places listings in West and Southwest Baltimore =

National Register of Historic Places listings in the city of Baltimore, Maryland

The locations of the National Register properties and districts listed below (at least for all showing latitude and longitude coordinates below) may be seen in a map by clicking on "Map of all coordinates".

This list covers some of the properties in the independent city of Baltimore, but not those in the county of Baltimore surrounding the city. The county actually does not include the city; the city is an independent county-equivalent.

This National Park Service list is complete through NPS recent listings posted May 1, 2026.

== Current listings ==
| | Name on the Register | Image | Date listed | Location | District | Description |
|---|---|---|---|---|---|---|
| 1 | American Ice Company | American Ice Company | July 3, 2013 (#13000459) | 2100 W. Franklin Street; 39°17′37″N 76°39′08″W | West | |
| 2 | Baltimore National Cemetery | Baltimore National Cemetery | March 8, 2016 (#16000059) | 5501 Frederick Ave. 39°16′27″N 76°42′24″W | Beechfield | |
| 3 | Cummins Memorial Church | Cummins Memorial Church | October 31, 1979 (#79003215) | 1210 W. Lanvale St. 39°17′53″N 76°38′17″W | West | |
| 4 | Frederick Douglass High School | Frederick Douglass High School | May 18, 1989 (#89000412) | 1601 N. Calhoun St. 39°18′27″N 76°38′33″W | West | |
| 5 | Edmondson Avenue Historic District | Edmondson Avenue Historic District | December 27, 2010 (#10001084) | Winchester St., Braddish Ave. north of Edmondson Ave., Edmondson Ave. west of Braddish Ave., Franklintown Rd. north of W. Franklin St. 39°17′53″N 76°39′47″W | West | |
| 6 | Engine House No. 8 | Engine House No. 8 | January 26, 1995 (#94001577) | 1027 W. Mulberry St. 39°17′36″N 76°38′09″W | West | |
| 7 | Franklin Square Historic District | Franklin Square Historic District | December 10, 1982 (#82001585) | Bounded by Mulberry, N. Carey, W. Baltimore, and Monroe Sts. 39°17′29″N 76°38′36″W | West | |
| 8 | Franklintown Historic District | Franklintown Historic District | November 11, 2001 (#01001214) | 5100-5201 N. Franklintown Rd., 1707-1809 N. Forest Park Ave., 5100 Hamilton Ave., and 5100 Fredwall Ave. 39°18′16″N 76°42′35″W | Southwest | |
| 9 | Hebrew Orphan Asylum | Hebrew Orphan Asylum | October 28, 2010 (#10000868) | 2700 Rayner Ave. 39°17′48″N 76°39′44″W | West | |
| 10 | Hollins-Roundhouse Historic District | Hollins-Roundhouse Historic District | July 22, 2009 (#09000548) | W. Baltimore and Schroeder Sts., south on Schroeder to Lombard; west on Lombard to Carey, south to Pratt, and east on Pratt to Hayes; 39°17′20″N 76°38′02″W | West | |
| 11 | James Lawrence Kernan Hospital | James Lawrence Kernan Hospital | September 24, 1979 (#79003275) | Windsor Mill Rd. and Forest Park Ave. 39°18′48″N 76°42′34″W | Southwest | |
| 12 | Lion Brothers Company Building | Lion Brothers Company Building | December 7, 2006 (#06000781) | 875 Hollins St. 39°17′22″N 76°37′54″W | West | |
| 13 | Loudon Park National Cemetery | Loudon Park National Cemetery | June 20, 1996 (#96000655) | 3445 Frederick Ave. 39°16′49″N 76°40′31″W | Southwest | |
| 14 | Old West Baltimore Historic District | Old West Baltimore Historic District | December 23, 2004 (#04001374) | Roughly bounded by North Ave., Dolphin St., Franklin St. and Fulton Ave. 39°18′14″N 76°38′17″W | West | |
| 15 | Edgar Allan Poe House | Edgar Allan Poe House | November 11, 1971 (#71001043) | 203 Amity St. 39°17′28″N 76°38′00″W | West | |
| 16 | Public School No. 111 | Public School No. 111 | September 25, 1979 (#79003219) | N. Carrollton Ave. and Riggs Rd. 39°18′03″N 76°38′15″W | West | |
| 17 | St. Luke's Church | St. Luke's Church | March 30, 1973 (#73002196) | 217 N. Carey St. 39°17′28″N 76°38′18″W | West | |
| 18 | Schwartze Mansion | Schwartze Mansion | September 12, 1985 (#85002174) | 4206 Euclid Ave. 39°16′58″N 76°41′10″W | Southwest | |
| 19 | Sellers Mansion | Sellers Mansion | December 28, 2001 (#01001369) | 801 N. Arlington St. 39°17′53″N 76°38′10″W | West | |
| 20 | Shaarei Tfiloh Synagogue | Shaarei Tfiloh Synagogue | October 10, 1996 (#96001085) | 2001 Liberty Heights Ave. 39°19′11″N 76°39′04″W | West | |
| 21 | Weiskittel-Roehle Burial Vault | Weiskittel-Roehle Burial Vault | May 19, 1976 (#76002185) | Section P of Loudon Park Cemetery; 39°16′45″N 76°40′47″W | Southwest | |
| 22 | Windsor Hills Historic District | Windsor Hills Historic District | December 27, 2002 (#02001610) | Roughly bounded by Chelsea Terrace, Windsor Mill Rd., Talbot Rd., Westchester Rd., and Woodhaven Ave. 39°18′59″N 76°41′11″W | West | |

== See also ==
- National Register of Historic Places listings in Maryland
