= National Register of Historic Places listings in Baltimore =

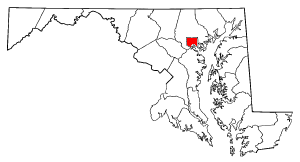
Location of the city of Baltimore in Maryland

The National Register of Historic Places listings in the city of Baltimore, Maryland covers the more than 300 properties and historic districts listed on the National Register of Historic Places in the independent city of Baltimore, Maryland. NRHP listings in Baltimore County, which surrounds but does not include the city, are in the National Register of Historic Places listings in Baltimore County, Maryland.

The central portion of the city and significant portions of the waterfront and city park system are included in the federally designated Baltimore National Heritage Area.

Historic properties and districts in Baltimore, Maryland on the National Register of Historic Places:

- NRHPs in Central Baltimore (108 listings)
- NRHPs in North and Northwest Baltimore (64 listings)
- NRHPs in West and Southwest Baltimore (22 listings)
- NRHPs in East and Northeast Baltimore (45 listings)
- NRHPs in South and Southeast Baltimore (77 listings)

== See also ==
- National Register of Historic Places listings in Maryland
