= Embroidered patch =

Emblem or badge on clothing or hats

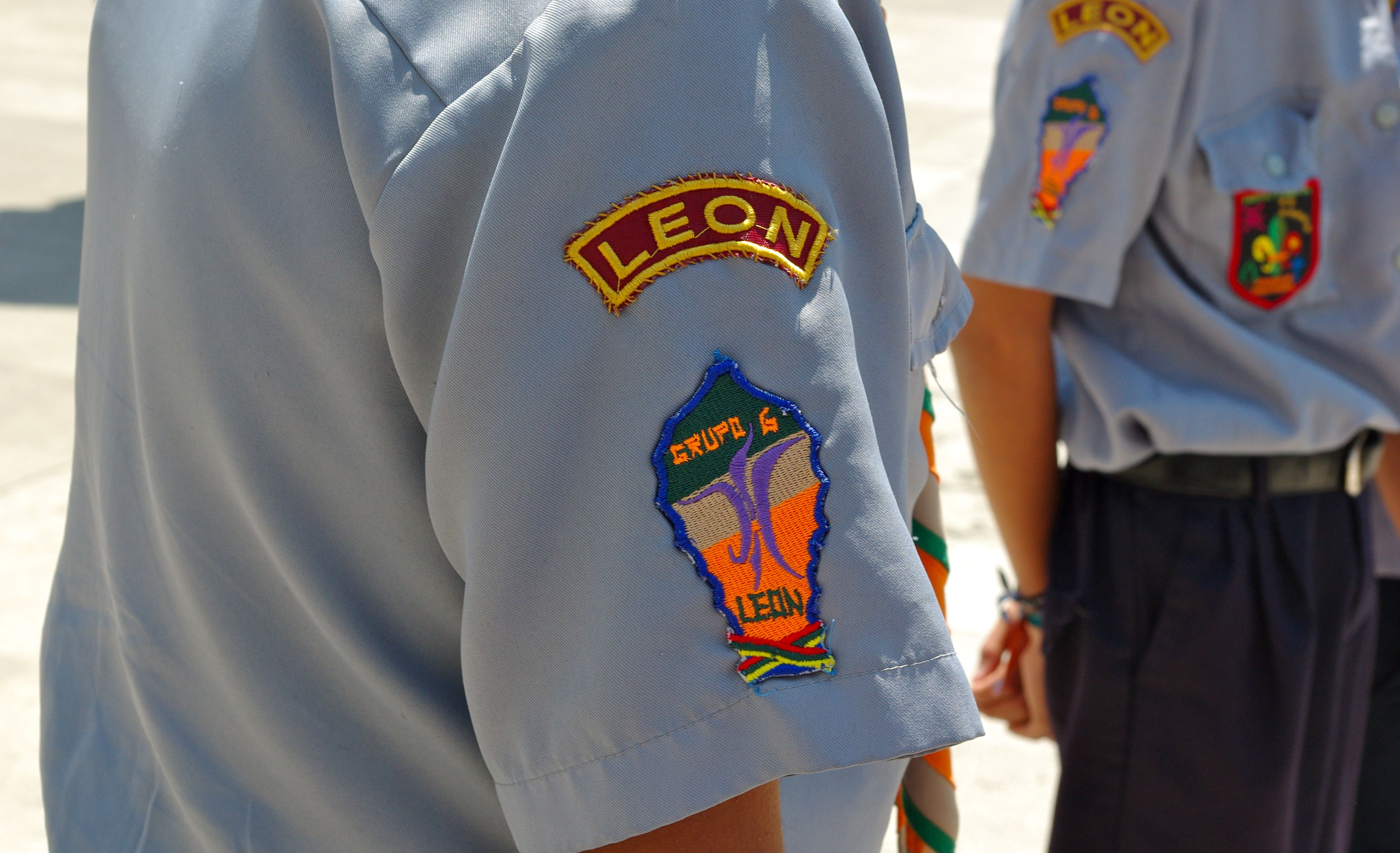
Scouting patches worn by adult leaders, Mexico City, March 2010.

An embroidered patch, also known as a cloth badge, is a piece of embroidery which is created by using a fabric backing and thread. The art of making embroidered patches is an old tradition and was done by hand. During the first half of the twentieth century they were commonly embroidered using a Schiffli embroidery machine. High-speed, computerized machines have led to mass production.

There are various methods of affixing them to the fabric surface. Embroidered patches can be attached with a pin, sewn on, or affixed with more modern methods such as iron-on, dryer heat-activated adhesive, and Velcro backing.

== History ==
Embroidered patches—an important identification tool for military and other uniformed personnel—trace their roots thousands of years ago to ancient cultures of the Mediterranean, Mideast, China, India and South America, where the art of decorating fabric with thread stitching originated. Elaborate hand-stitched designs and patterns were used to embellish the robes of royalty and for religious artifacts.

Today, embroidered patches are used by government organisations (including uniforms of military forces, emergency services and other specialised workers), sports teams and companies in the private sector to denote rank, job, specific position or specialised unit. Youth groups, including sports teams, scouting organizations and specialized clubs, often wear clothing emblazoned with embroidered patches. They are also used by space agencies on the uniforms of astronauts to denote the mission (mission patch). Patches are collected by enthusiasts as well.

=== Military use ===
As with other forms of heraldry, the colours and images in military patches are chosen to symbolically convey different positive traits and values.

==== United States ====
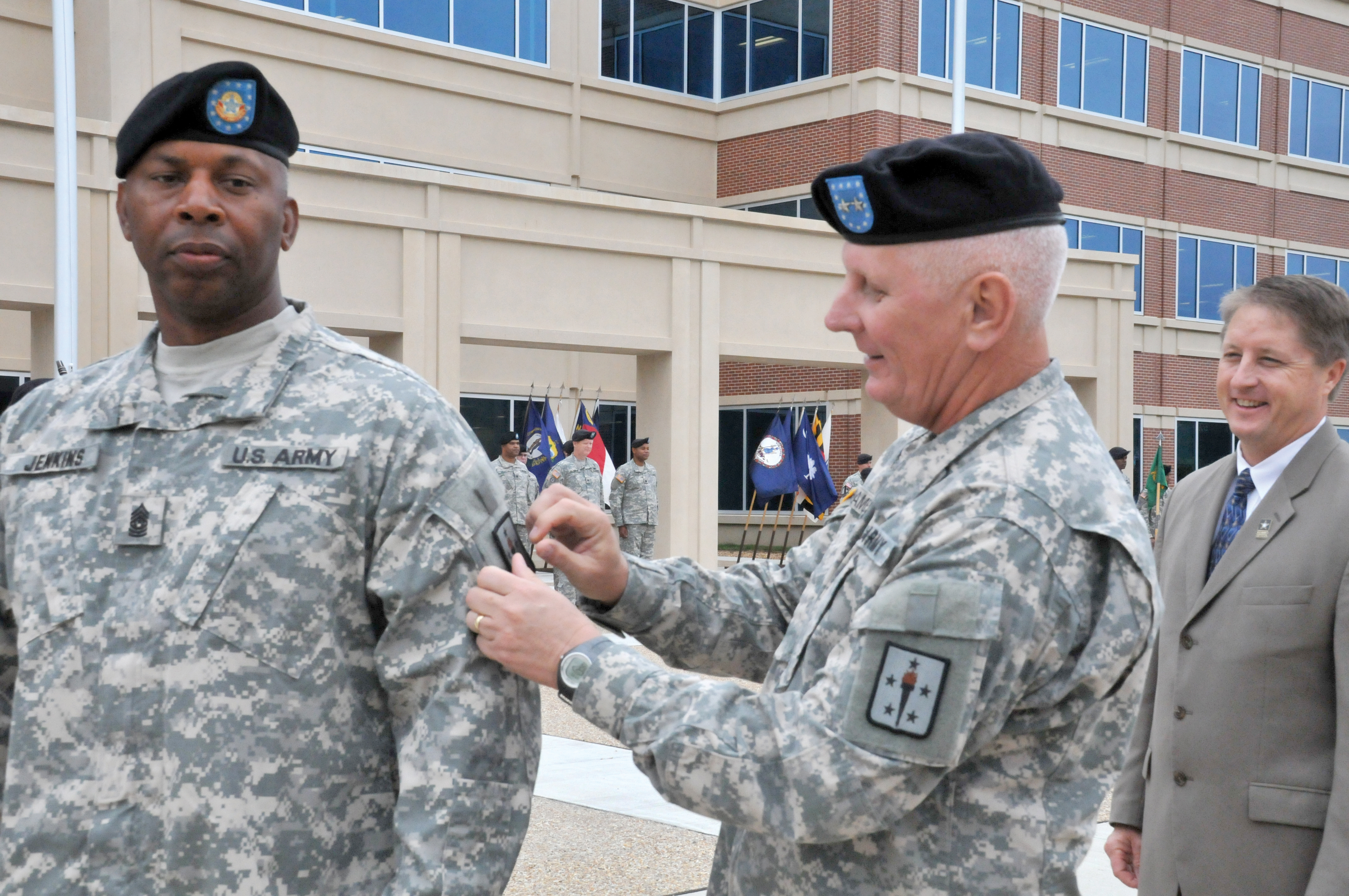
US Army Sustainment Center of Excellence patch ceremony, 2009

Embroidered patches were first adopted by United States military units, with some crude, unofficial examples found on soldiers’ uniforms from the War of 1812, 1845 Mexican War, and the Civil War (1861–65) Unit identifications, also known as shoulder sleeve insignia (or SSI) is a relatively new component of the modern military uniform after originating during World War I, when Gen. John J. Pershing authorized limited use.

The oldest of all official U.S. military patches is the "Big Red One" of the 1st Infantry Division, first issued on October 31, 1918. SSI became common during World War II and distinctive patches for individual units of the US Army, Navy, Marines, Air Force, and Coast Guard have become a proud tradition. There is an active collectors' market, especially for rare, limited-edition patches.

Various regulations exist on how badges are displayed, how many may be worn at one time and whether or not such badges may be worn on the uniform of more than one branch of service. In the U.S. Army, the SSI is worn on the upper left arm, just below the uniform’s shoulder seam. It is sometimes worn on other places, most notably when soldiers’ body armor covers their shoulders.

For the U.S. military, patch designs are certified and protected by the Institute of Heraldry. The institute decides how military patches are displayed, how it is worn, and the reasons for display. A hallmark is assigned to each certified manufacturer of military insignia to indicate which manufacturer produced the product. It is illegal for other manufacturers to create designs on their patches that incorporate the likeness of an official Army heraldic item.

The embroidered patch industry is dominated by several long established companies such as the Chicago Embroidery Company (founded in 1890), Lion Brothers (founded in 1899), St. Louis Embroidery (founded in 1887), A-B Emblem, and Penn Emblem (founded in 1947). As with much of the textile manufacturing industry in the United States, manufacturing of emblems has largely moved out of the country, though some manufacturers still maintain domestic factories.

== Manufacture ==
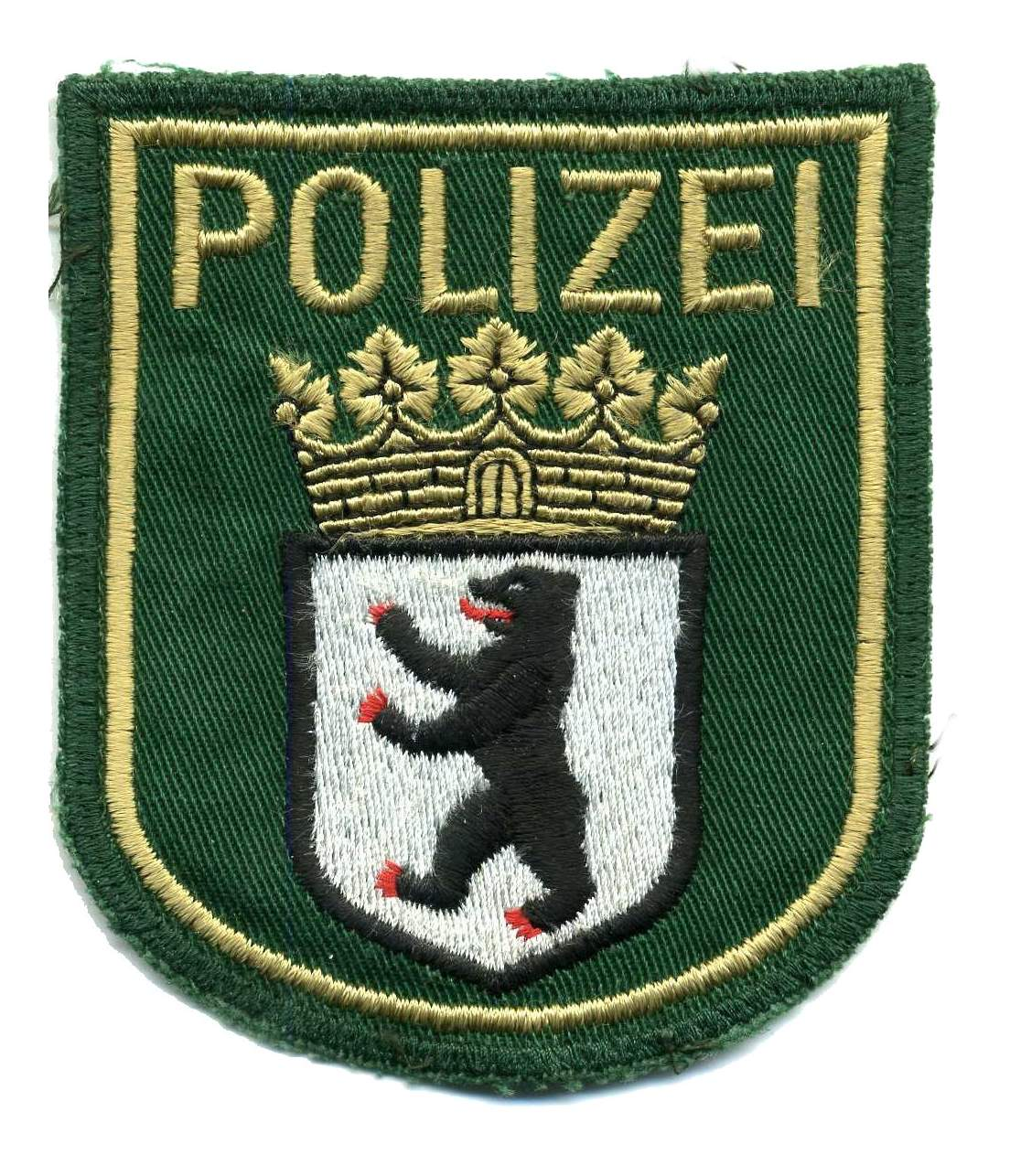
German police patch

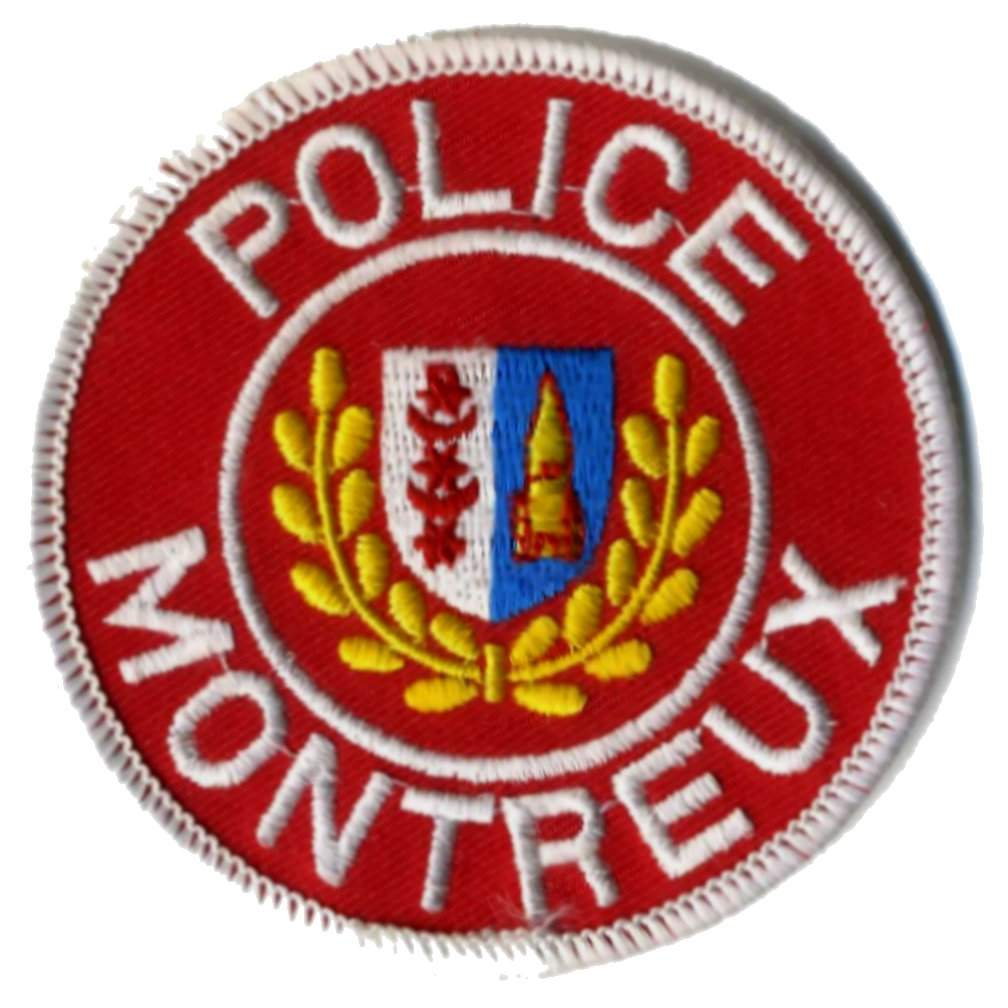
Montreux police patch

Before the advent of computer technology, patches were made by hand. The general process, however, remains the same today. First, a fabric backing is cut to shape. To prevent fraying, the edges of the backing are heat-sealed. Then, the thread is stitched into place. Some designs incorporate the backing as the background of the patch, while others completely cover the backing with stitches. To finish the patch, iron-on adhesive may be applied to the reverse—a step that was not originally done.

Machinery created during the 18th- and 19th-century Industrial Revolution changed garment production with technology such as power looms and sewing machines, making fabrics of more uniform quality and greatly increased production efficiency. Embroidery—once a time-consuming hand-made stitch-by-stitch process—was revolutionized by the introduction of the Schiffli embroidery machine, invented by Isaak Groebli of Switzerland in 1863. Like a sewing machine, it operated with a two-thread system. Early production from the multi-needle machine, powered by a hand-turned crank, wasn’t much quicker than handwork, but significantly, multiple copies of identical designs could be created. Groebli's machine utilized the combination of a continuously threaded needle and shuttle containing a bobbin of thread. The shuttle itself looked similar to the hull of a sailboat. "Schiffli" means "little boat" in the Swiss dialect of the German language, so his machine came to be known as a schiffli machine. An automatic machine, refined by Isaak’s eldest son in 1898, simplified the mechanical system so it could be run by a single operator.

Types of stitches—including chain stitch, buttonhole or blanket stitch, running stitch, satin stitch, and cross stitch— are the basis of embroidery. Patches are often crafted from chain, satin, and hemming stitches and machine work relies on the use of multiple threads.

Advanced technology allows virtually any design to be recreated in thread on an embroidered patch. Images previously created by hand in a time-consuming process can now be quickly, digitally scanned, and computer-controlled, with multi-head sewing machines use several colors of thread simultaneously.

Other modern advancements include applying a plastic backing to the patch, improving stiffness, and preventing bunching or wrinkling of the design. Patches are often die-cut into specific shapes with a border protected from unraveling by serge stitching. Polyester blend threads are colorfast and have superior durability as compared to cotton thread.

== Alternatives ==
Modern alternatives to embroidered patches are PVC (polyvinyl chloride) patches, which allow more intricate designs.

== See also ==
- Embroidery
- Iron-on
- Patch collecting
- Scout badge
