= List of ice companies =

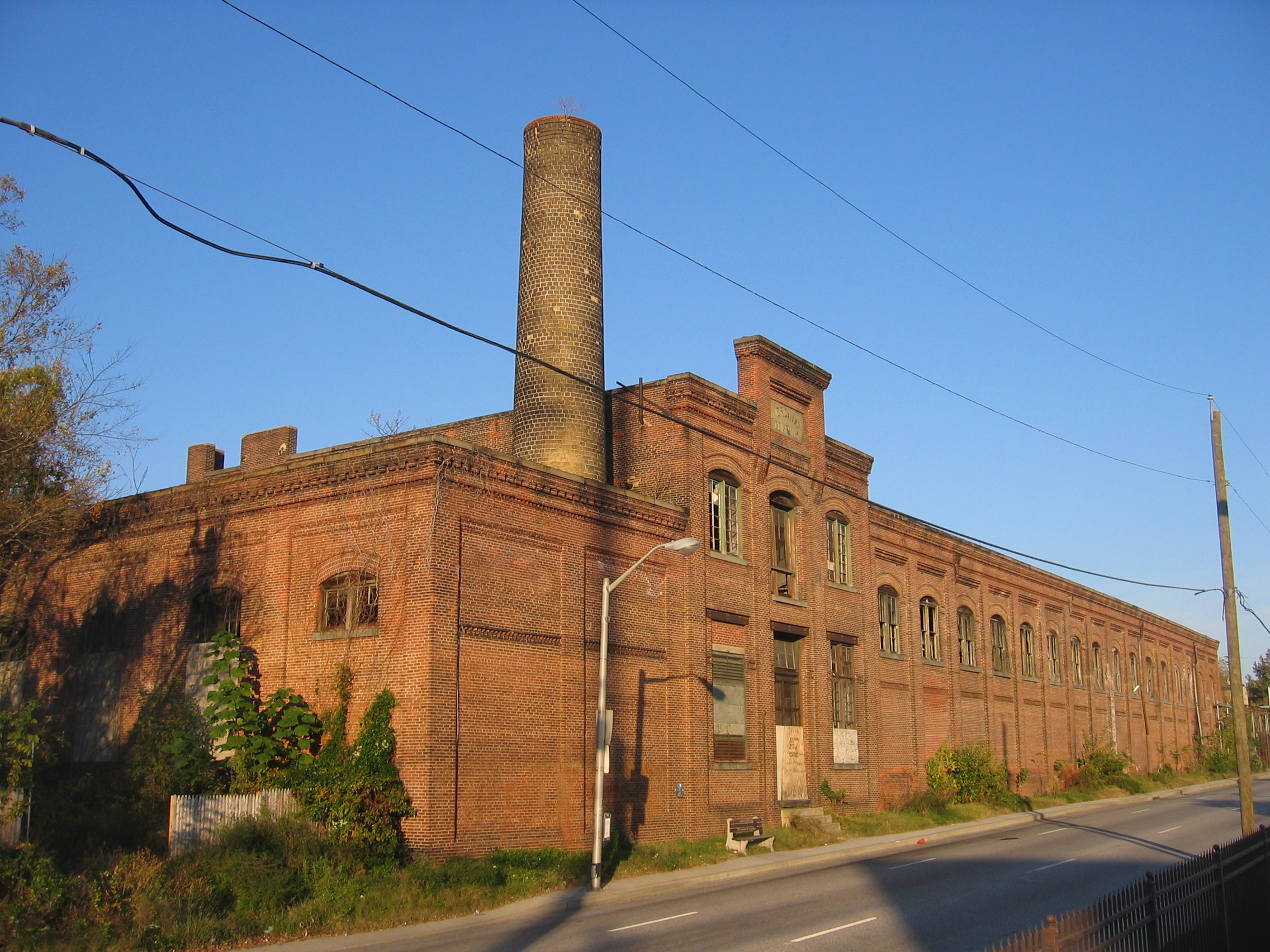
The American Ice Company building in Baltimore, Maryland, is listed on the U.S. National Register of Historic Places (NRHP).

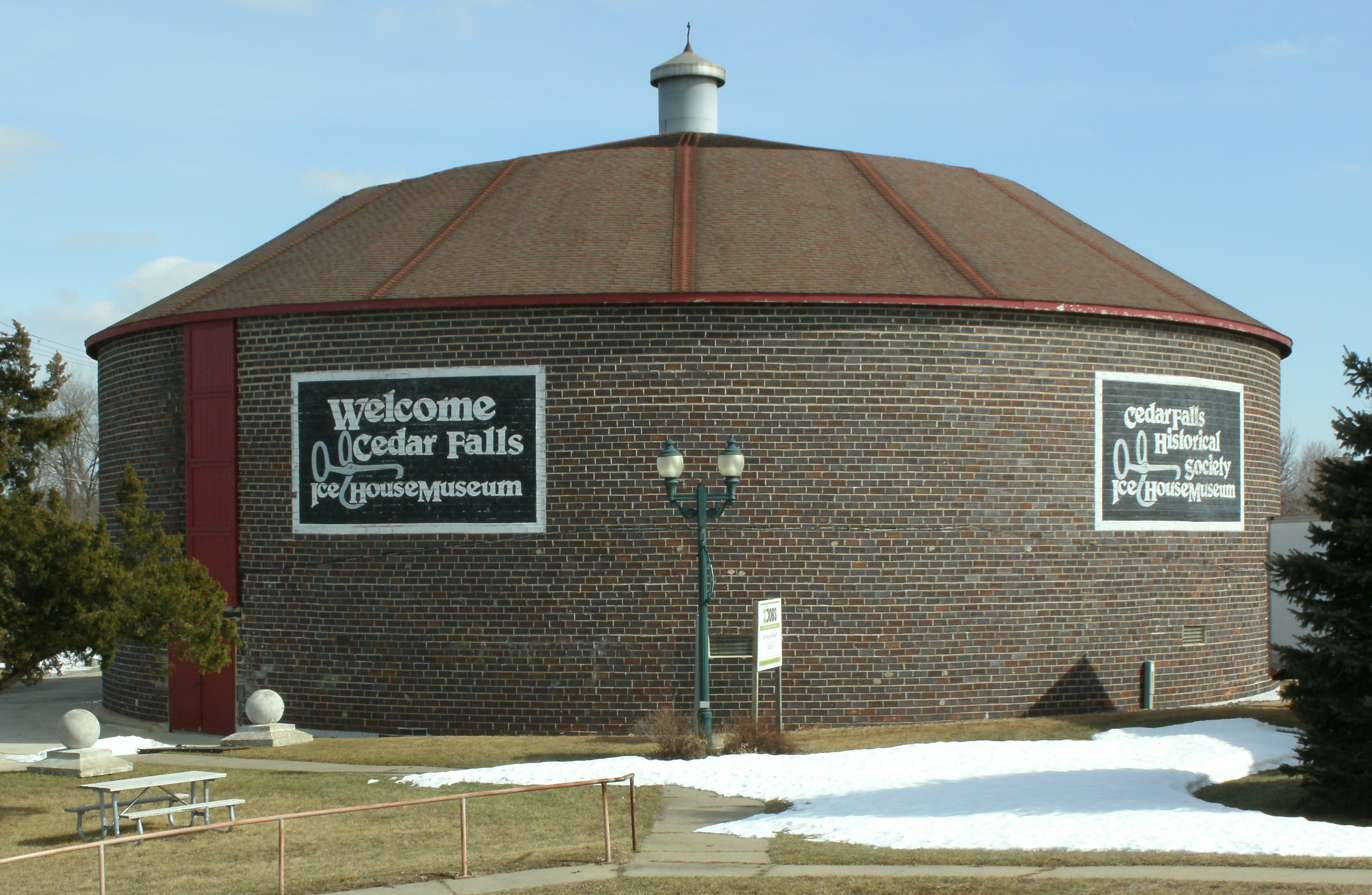
The Cedar Falls Ice House in Cedar Falls, Iowa

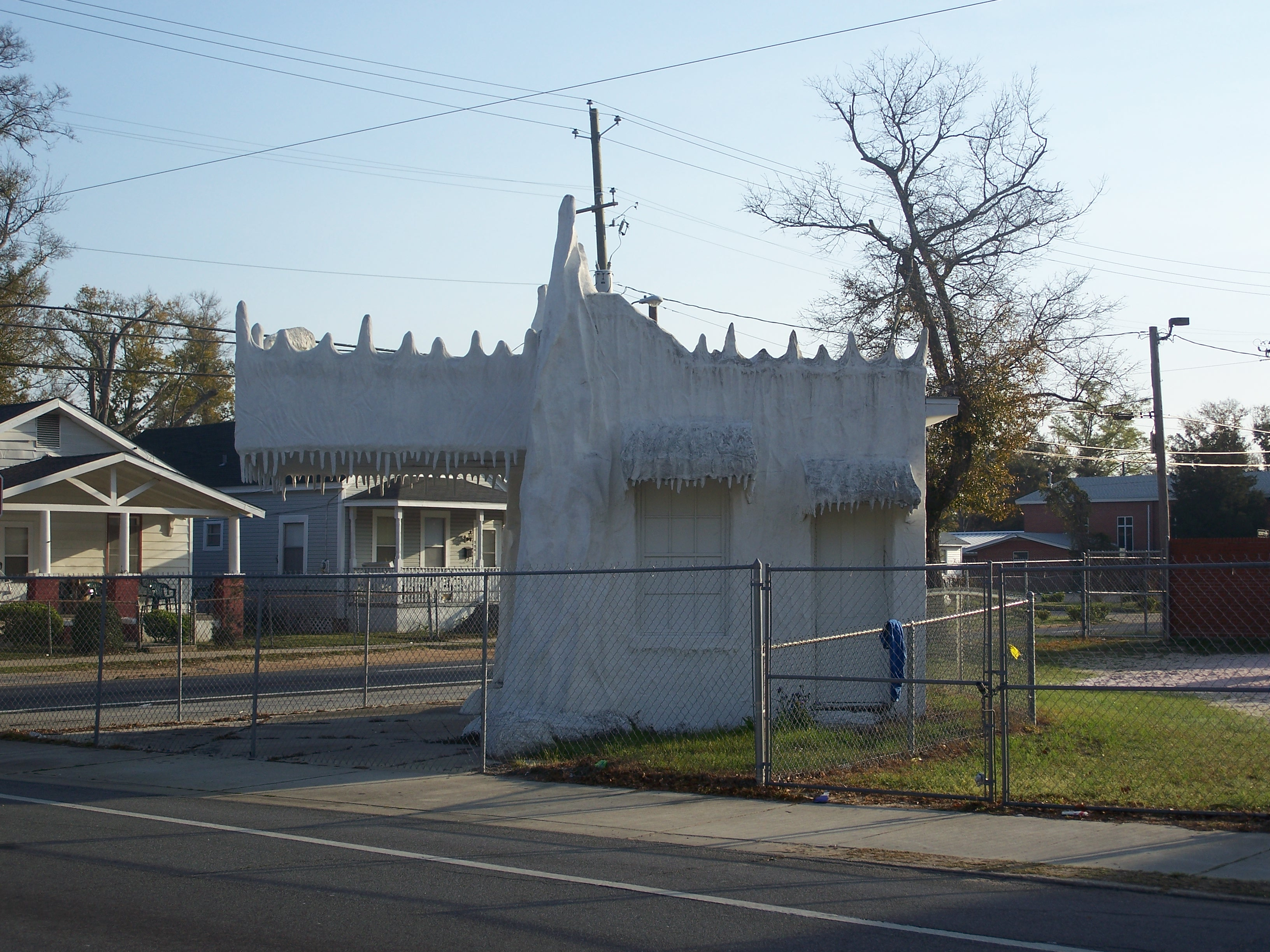
The Crystal Ice Company Building in Pensacola, Florida, is listed on the U.S. NRHP.

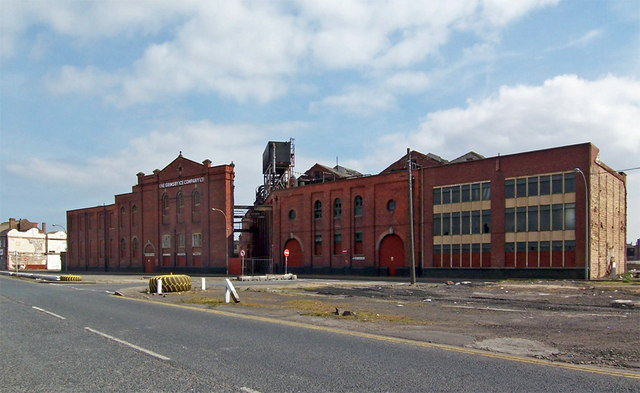
The Grimsby Ice Factory in Grimsby, England, was built in 1900 and is a Grade II listed building.

This is a list of ice companies. Ice companies manufacture and market ice and are involved in the ice trade. Some ice companies manufacture and market dry ice.

== Notable companies ==
- American Ice Company – a business that manufactured and delivered ice throughout the mid-Atlantic U.S. states. Its site is a historic ice manufacturing plant located in Baltimore, Maryland, United States that is listed on the U.S. National Register of Historic Places (NRHP). It is a large industrial brick building constructed in 1911 for the American Ice Company.
  - American Ice Company Baltimore Plant No. 2 – a historic American Ice Company ice manufacturing plant located in Baltimore, Maryland
- Barbados Ice Cream Company Limited
- Cedar Falls Ice and Fuel Company
- Ceylon Cold Stores
- Crystal Ice Company – a former company that sold ice to travelers. The Crystal Ice Company Building is listed on the U.S. NRHP.
- Florida Ice and Farm Company
- Follett Ice – a privately held company that manufactures beverage and ice for the healthcare, foodservice, hospitality, and supermarket industries. Headquartered in Easton, Pennsylvania, the company operates two manufacturing facilities in Easton and Gdansk, Poland.
- Grand Forks Ice Company
- Grimsby Ice Factory – a former ice factory located in Grimsby, England that was built in 1900 to provide crushed ice for ships to keep stored fish cold. It engaged in operations up to 1990. The site is managed by the Great Grimsby Ice Factory Trust. The buildings still contain some of the original historic machinery from times of the operations' origins. It is a Grade II listed building that is owned by Associated British Ports.
- Kalgoorlie Brewing and Ice Company
- Knickerbocker Ice Company – was an ice company based in New York State during the 19th century
- Milford Ice and Refrigeration Company
- Morewood Lake Ice company
- Mutual Ice Company – its building in Westport, Kansas City, Missouri is listed on the U.S. NRHP
- New State Ice Company
- Princeton Ice Company
- R. and W. Scott Ice Company Powerhouse and Ice House Site
- Standard Ice Company – its building in downtown Stuttgart, Arkansas is listed on the U.S. NRHP
- Wenham Lake Ice Company – operating out of Wenham Lake in Massachusetts, US; harvested ice and exported it all around the world before the advent of factory-made ice
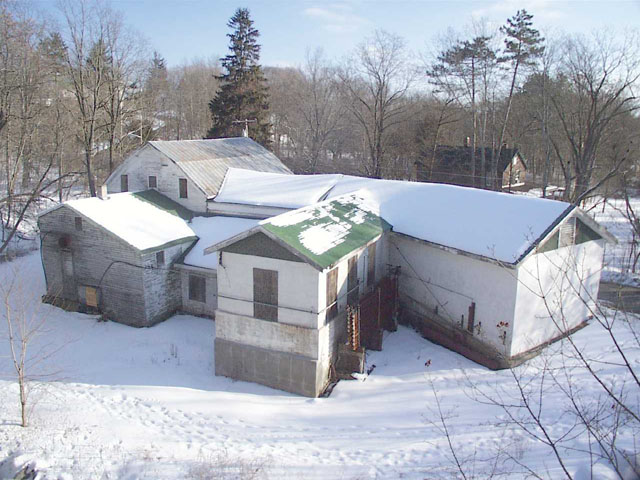
The Metz Ice Plant is a historic ice manufacturing plant located in the Delaware Water Gap National Recreation Area at Milford, Pennsylvania. The Milford Ice and Refrigeration Company was based here.

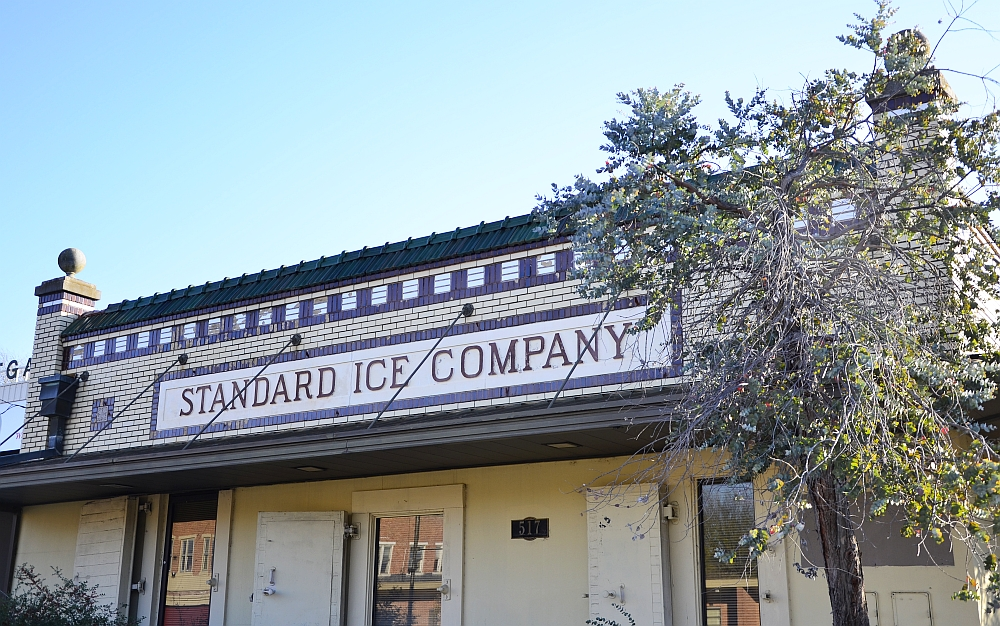
The Standard Ice Company Building is listed on the U.S. NRHP.

== See also ==
- Ice house (building)
- Icemaker
- Iceman (occupation)
- Lists of companies – company-related list articles on Wikipedia
