= Flag patch =

Piece of fabric displaying the national flag of a country

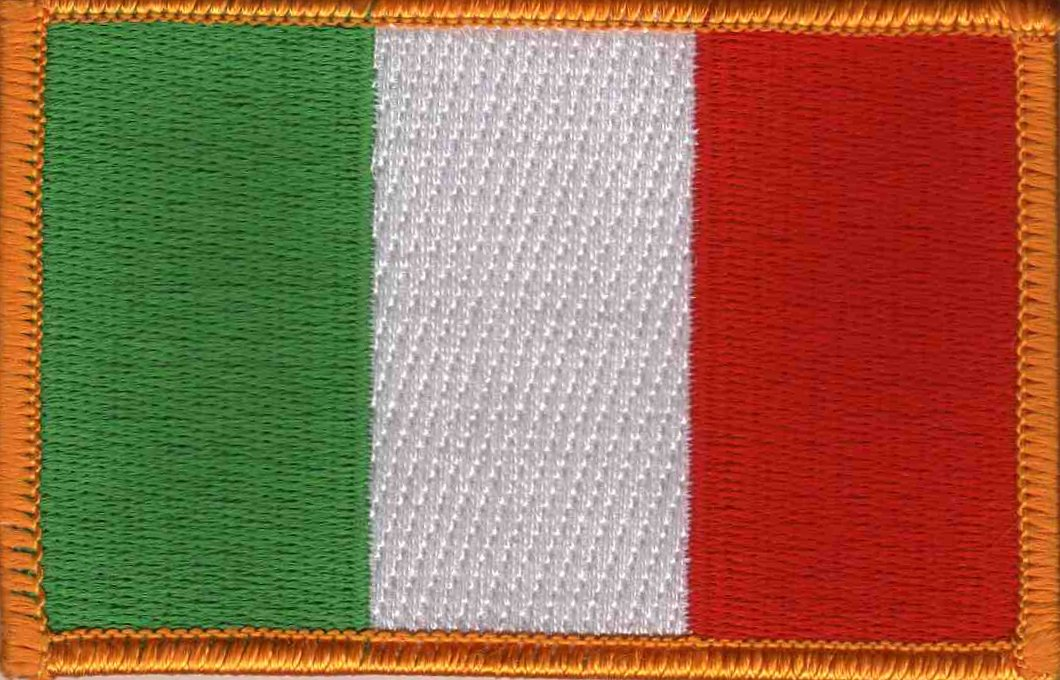
An Italian flag patch.

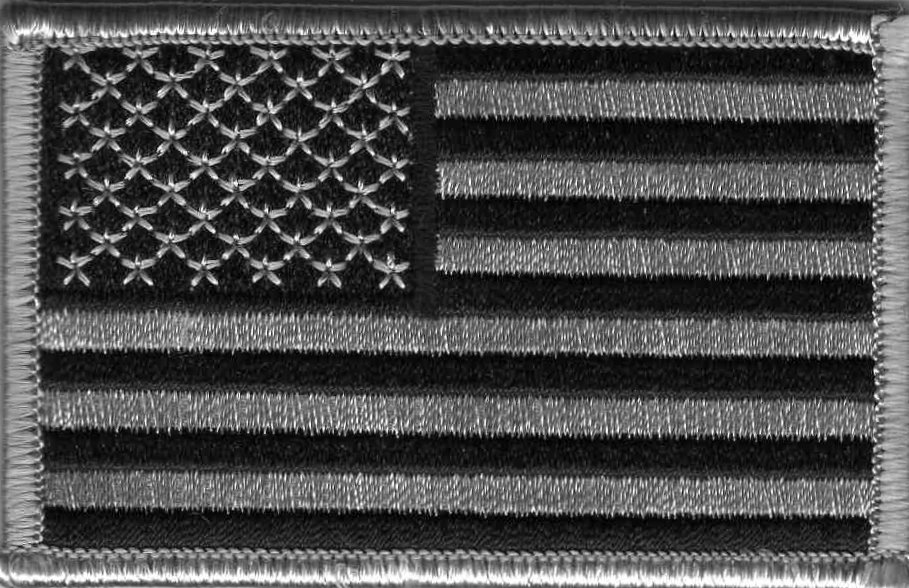
An urban camouflaged American flag Patch.

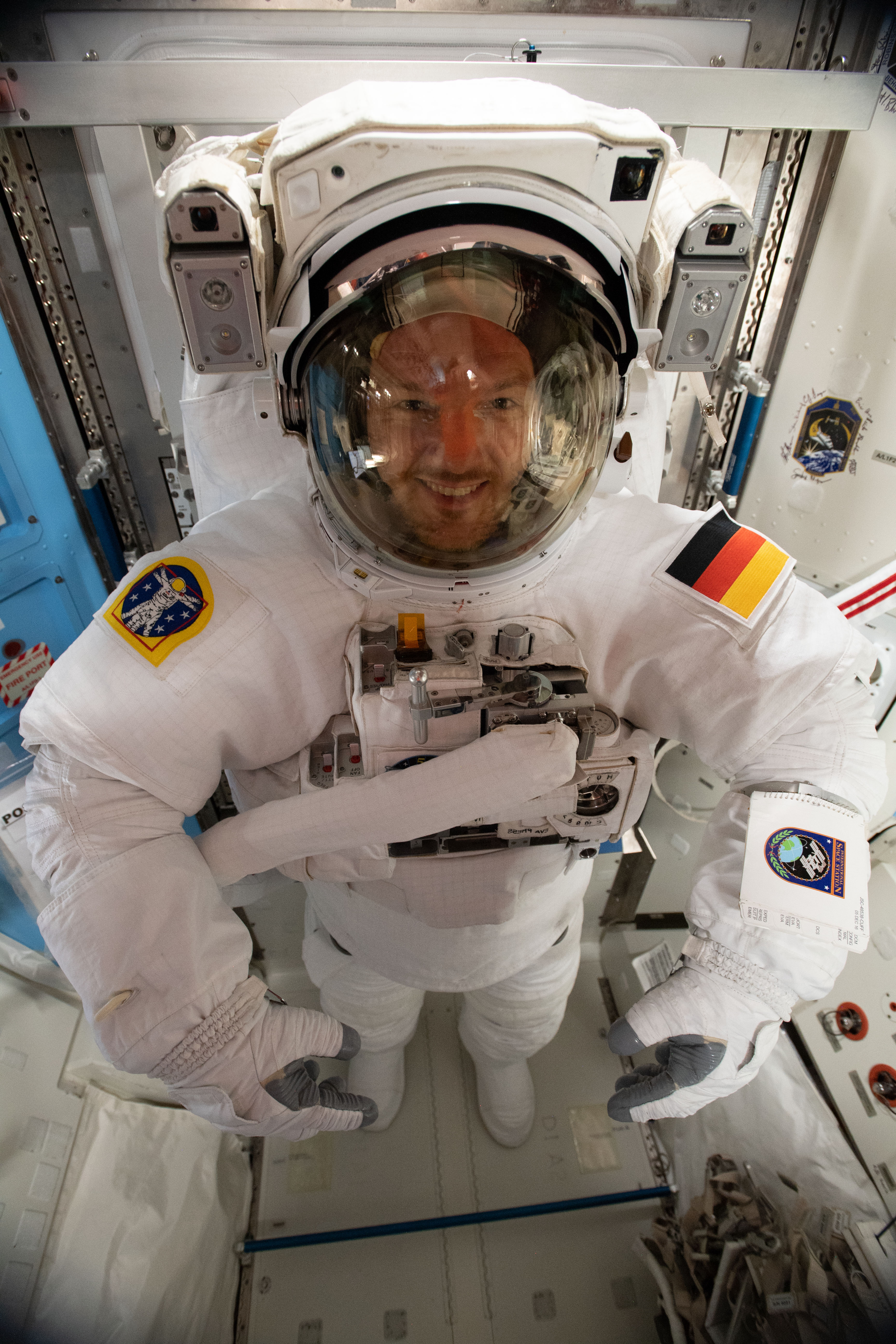
Alexander Gerst wearing a German flag patch on his spacesuit.

A flag patch is a piece of fabric displaying the national flag of a country. The image of the flag is usually produced by embroidery, using different colored threads. It can also be produced by printing directly on the fabric, although this is less common. Many countries have patches made to resemble their flag for use in their militaries, although it is not uncommon for them to also be used for personnel in civil jobs (police officers, civilian pilots, bus drivers, astronauts, etc.), as well as sports teams who include the flag patch of the country they represent in their uniform. Some countries, for instance the United States, have versions of their flag patch made in different color schemes in order to better blend in with their military camouflage. The three most common alternate color schemes are urban (black/silver, pictured), desert (tan/brown), and woodland (black/olive drab).

Flag patches are usually sewn onto bags or clothes. There is a fashion among backpackers to buy flag patches in the places where they go and keep them as souvenirs, or to show their origin. Backpackers from Canada, and the United States, have also sewn Canadian flag patches on their luggage when travelling, in order to avoid hostility while abroad.

== See also ==
- Patch collecting
