= R. and W. Scott Ice Company Powerhouse and Ice House Site =

- U.S. National Register of Historic Places
- U.S. Historic district
- Location within New York Location within the United States
- Nearest city: Stuyvesant, New York
- Coordinates: 42°21′28″N 73°47′22″W
- Area: 4 acres (1.6 ha)
- Built: 1885
- NRHP reference No.: 85000337
- Added to NRHP: February 21, 1985

R. and W. Scott Ice Company Powerhouse and Ice House Site is a national historic district located at Stuyvesant in Columbia County, New York. The district includes one contributing building, one contributing structure, and one contributing site. They are the remains of an ice house, the exterior walls and chimney of a powerhouse (ca. 1885) and the surviving features of a dock and bulkhead. The ice house measured 300 feet long and 200 feet wide and the foundation walls are two feet thick.

It was listed on the National Register of Historic Places in 1985.

== See also ==
- List of ice companies
