= Mutual Musicians' Foundation Building =

- Mutual Musicians Foundation Building
- U.S. National Register of Historic Places
- U.S. National Historic Landmark
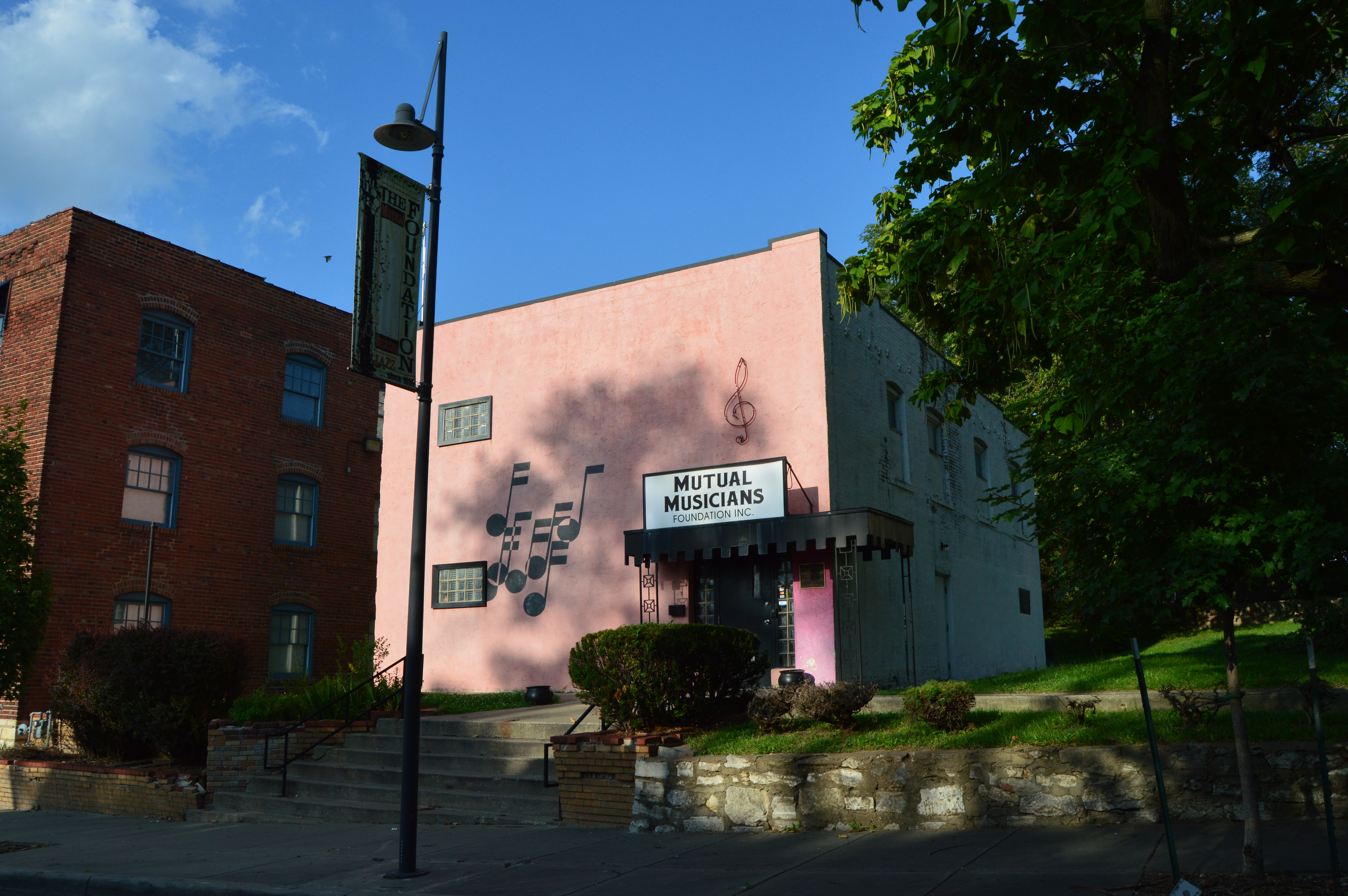

- Location within Missouri Location within the United States
- Location: 1823 Highland Ave., Kansas City, Missouri
- Coordinates: 39°5′25″N 94°33′43″W
- Area: less than one acre
- Built: 1904
- Architect: Rudolf Markgraf
- NRHP reference No.: 79001372

Significant dates
- Added to NRHP: February 7, 1979
- Designated NHL: December 21, 1981

The Mutual Musicians' Foundation Building is a historic building at 1823 Highland Avenue in Kansas City, Missouri. It is also known as the Mutual Musicians Association Building or the Musician's Union Local or the Local No. 627 of the American Federation of Musicians. It was a center of the development of the "Kansas City Style" of jazz, and was immortalized in the song "627 Stomp". Famous members of the Mutual Musicians Foundation included Count Basie, Bennie Moten, Jay McShann, George F. Lee, singer Julia Lee, trumpeter Hot Lips Page, tenor saxophonists Dick Wilson, Herschel Evans and Lester Young, alto saxophonist Charlie Parker, drummer Baby Lovett, and pianist Pete Johnson. The building was declared a National Historic Landmark in 1981. It continues to be used as an active performing venue, and also houses a museum.

== Description and history ==
The Mutual Musicians' Foundation Building is located in downtown Kansas City, on the east side of Highland Avenue between 18th and 19th Streets. It is a two-story masonry structure, built out of pressed brick that has been covered in painted stucco. Originally built as a multiunit residential property, many of its windows have been removed, their openings filled either by bricks or glass blocks. The interior has been extensively altered from its original residential appearance.

In the 1920s, Kansas City became a major center for a new style of jazz that resulted from a significant influx of musicians to the city. American Federation of Musicians Local #627 was founded in 1917, and would over a three-decade period have as members many leading jazz musicians of the period. The local sponsored tournaments in which musicians competed, whose proceeds were eventually used to acquire and adapt this building as its headquarters. The "Kansas City jazz" era ended in 1939, when political reformers gained control of the city and closed many of its clubs and musical establishments. The Mutual Musicians' Foundation, established in 1929 as the Negro Musicians Association, sponsored jam sessions and events here through the 1950s and 1960s, a practice that continues today.

== See also ==
- List of National Historic Landmarks in Missouri
- National Register of Historic Places listings in Kansas City, Missouri
