= American Ice Company =

Historic building in Maryland, USA

- American Ice Company Baltimore
- U.S. National Register of Historic Places
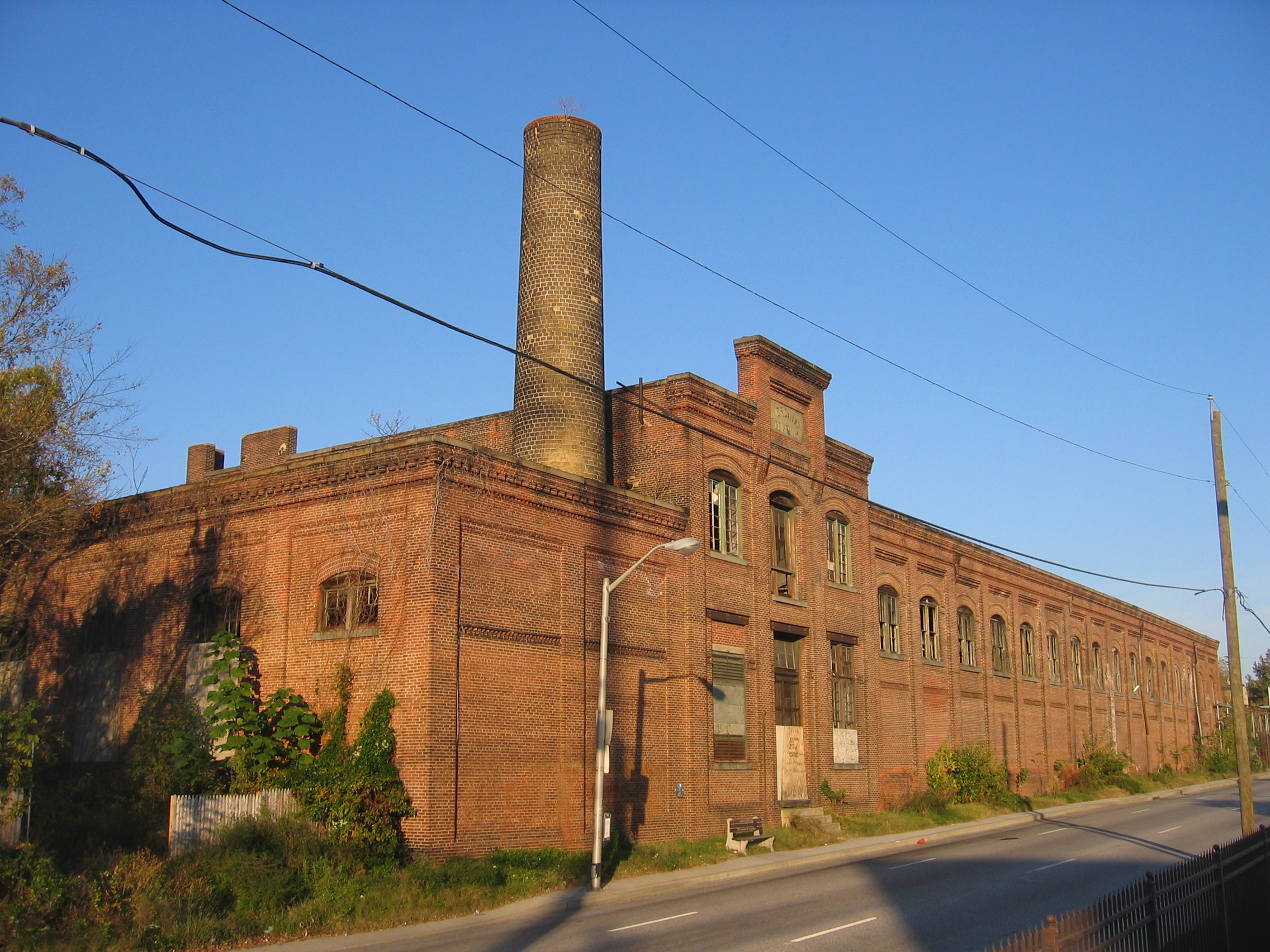

- Location within Baltimore Location within Maryland Location within the United States
- Location: 2100 W. Franklin St., Baltimore, Maryland
- Coordinates: 39°17′37.8″N 76°39′7.8″W
- Built: 1911
- NRHP reference No.: 13000459
- Added to NRHP: July 3, 2013

The American Ice Company is a historic ice manufacturing plant located at 2100 West Franklin Street in Baltimore, Maryland, United States. It is a large industrial brick building designed by Mortimer & Company and constructed by Fidelity Construction in 1910-11 for the American Ice Company, a business that manufactured and delivered ice throughout the Mid-Atlantic and South. The building is two stories, with the brick laid in American bond, and is 21 bays long. Three of those bays at one end of the building are slightly projected and topped by a stepped parapet, forming the entrance area of the building.

By the 1980s, Baltimore American Ice, which had acquired American Ice in the 1960s, had switched mainly to the production of bagged ice for businesses, and dry ice for industrial clients.

A two-alarm fire at Baltimore American Ice heavily damaged the rear of the facility in May 2001. On March 2, 2004, a more extensive fire destroyed recent additions to the dry ice plant, and caused severe damage to a corner of the original circa 1911 factory.

The building was listed on the National Register of Historic Places in 2013. A project to renovate the property into a mixed use event space, restaurant, concert venue, artist incubator, and community facility was set to begin in July 2019. The project never came to fruition, and as recently as 2022 the property was up for lease, auction, or sale by several real estate companies in Baltimore. Currently the site remains empty and untouched.

== See also ==
- American Ice Company Baltimore Plant No. 2
- List of ice companies
- National Register of Historic Places listings in West and Southwest Baltimore
