= Crystal Ice Company Building =

- U.S. National Register of Historic Places
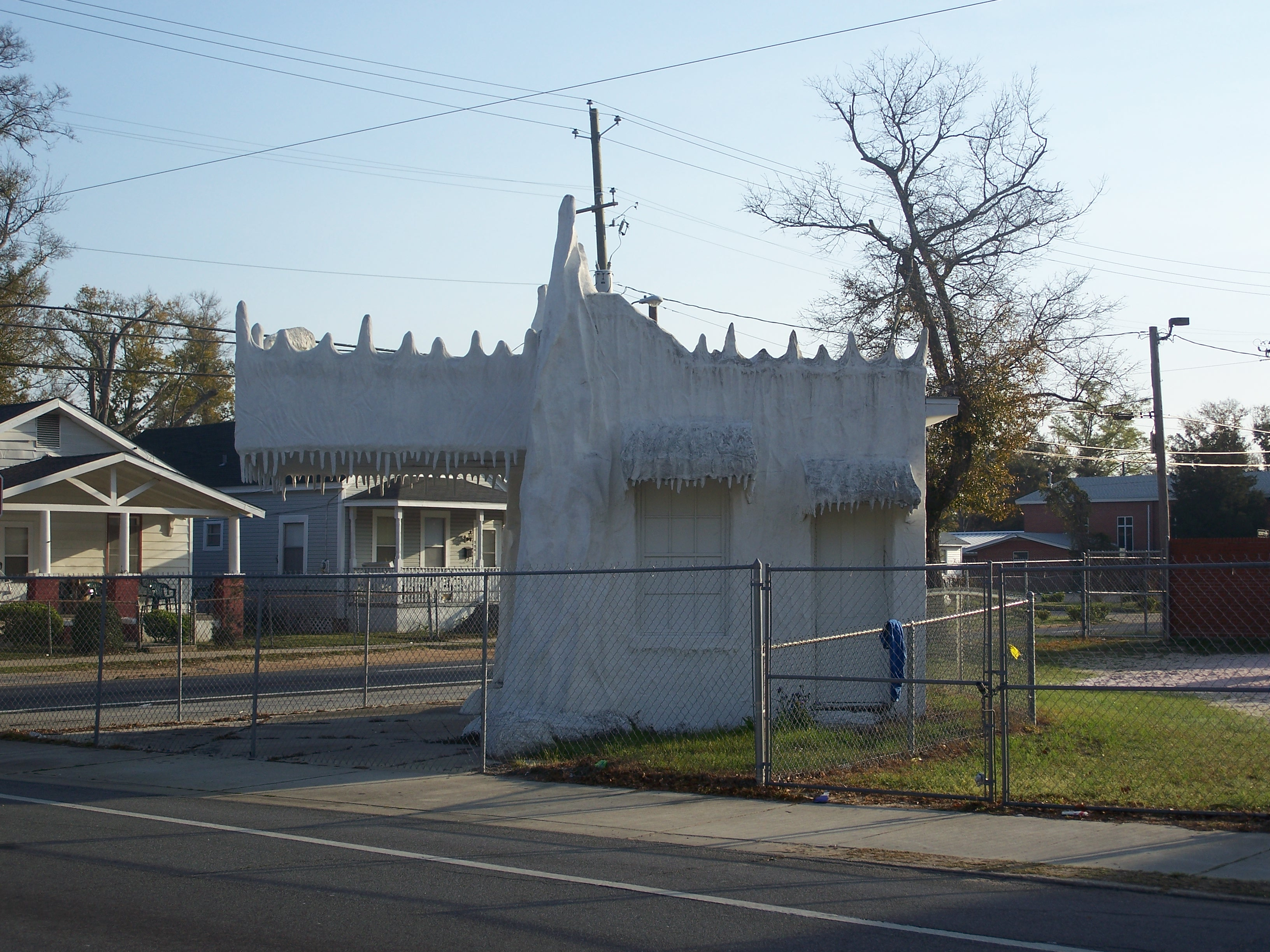

- Location within Florida Location within the United States
- Location: Pensacola, Florida
- Coordinates: 30°26′5″N 87°12′46″W
- Architect: Steve Fulghum
- Architectural style: Masonry Vernacular
- NRHP reference No.: 83001445
- Added to NRHP: September 29, 1983

The Crystal Ice Company Building is a historic building located at 2024 North Davis Street in Pensacola, Florida. Built in 1932, the building was used by the Crystal Ice Company to sell ice to travelers. The building, which resembles a block of ice, is one of the few surviving vernacular roadside buildings in Pensacola. On September 29, 1983, it was added to the U.S. National Register of Historic Places.

== History ==
Around 1930, Guy Spearman established the Crystal Ice Company in Pensacola. The ice industry had developed in the late 1860s with the growth of the area's fishing industry; yet by the 1920s, refrigerators began to reduce the need for manufactured ice. In 1970, upon Spearman's death, the company was bought by Connohio Corporation.

== See also ==
- List of ice companies
