= Dr. Generous Henderson House =

Historic house in Missouri, United States

- U.S. National Register of Historic Places
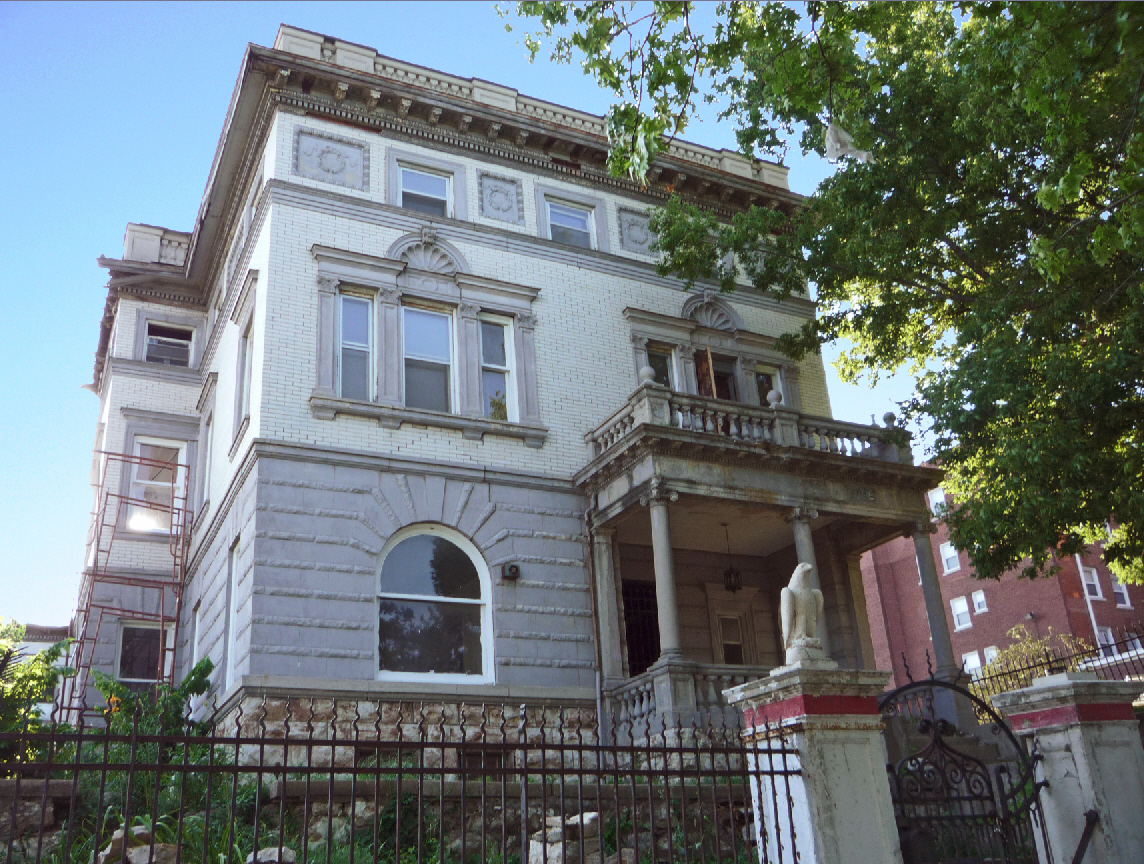

- Location within Missouri Location within the United States
- Location: 1016 The Paseo; Kansas City, Missouri
- Coordinates: 39°6′4″N 94°33′51″W
- Area: less than one acre
- Built: 1899
- Architect: Rudolf Markgraf
- Architectural style: Late 19th And 20th Century Revivals, Second Renaissance Revival
- NRHP reference No.: 79001368
- Added to NRHP: February 26, 1979

The Dr. Generous Henderson House is a historic home located at 1016 The Paseo, once one of the most prestigious areas of Kansas City, Missouri.

== History ==
It was designed by local architect, Rudolf Markgraf and built in 1899. It is a three-story, Second Renaissance Revival style brick and stone dwelling with terra cotta ornamentation. It has two-story rear section and measures approximately 55 feet long and 42 feet wide. It features a cast iron cornice, oriel window, and columns. Also on the property is a contributing carriage house. The house was built for a Dr. Generous Henderson (1844–1924). His medical practice in Kansas City went on for forty-five years. The house is one of the few surviving examples of the Second Renaissance Revival style of architecture in Kansas City.

It was listed on the National Register of Historic Places in 1979.
