= Mutual Musicians Foundation =

Coordinates: 39°05′25″N 94°33′43″W

Mutual Musicians Foundation is a National Historic Landmark in Kansas City, Missouri.

== History ==
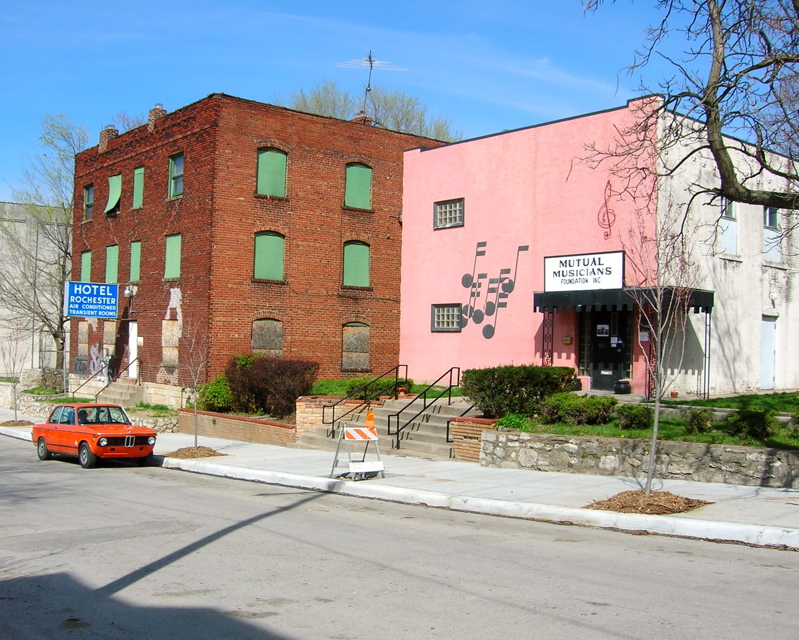
Mutual Musicians Foundation c. 2006

The building at 1823 Highland Avenue is the former home of the Colored Musicians Local 627. The Mutual Musicians Foundation was incorporated to manage the building and assets of Local 627. It continued operating the building as a social club for musicians and fans after the merger with Local 34 in 1970. In 1979, the foundation was prominently featured in Bruce Ricker's film, The Last of the Blue Devils. Since 1930, musicians have gathered at the foundation Friday and Saturday nights after midnight to jam into the early morning hours. The foundation also serves as a rehearsal space for members, a classroom for visiting students, and a venue for private parties.

In 1979, the Mutual Musicians' Foundation Building was added to the National Register of Historic Places. In 1981, it became a National Historic Landmark. In 2006, the city cracked down on the foundation, which had been serving liquor without a license for decades.

The Missouri House of Representatives passed "a provision to let the Mutual Musicians Foundation in Kansas City serve alcohol until 6 a.m." in May 2007. The Missouri Senate then passed SB 299, and Mutual Musicians Foundation is the only place in Missouri where it is legal to sell alcohol all night.
