= Standard Ice Company Building =

Twentieth century historic commercial building in Stuttgart, Arkansas

- U.S. National Register of Historic Places
- U.S. Historic district – Contributing property
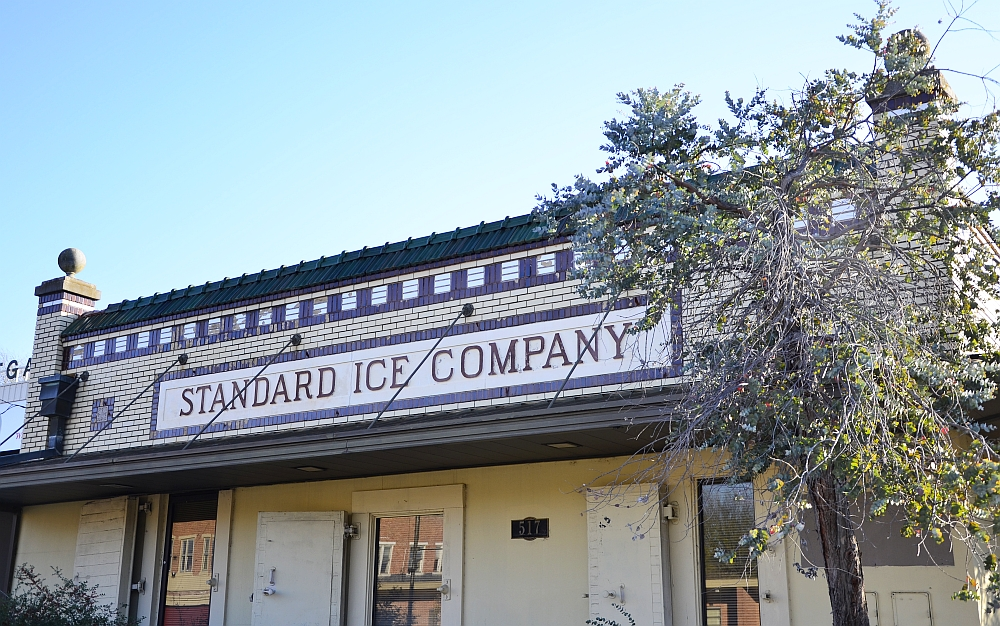
- Standard Ice Company Building in 2012

- Location within Arkansas Location within the United States
- Location: 517 S. Main Street; Stuttgart, Arkansas
- Coordinates: 34°29′52″N 91°33′8″W
- Area: less than one acre
- Built: 1926
- Architectural style: Mission/Spanish Revival
- Part of: Stuttgart Commercial Historic District (ID07000502)
- NRHP reference No.: 79003433

Significant dates
- Added to NRHP: July 2, 1979
- Designated CP: June 4, 2007

The Standard Ice Company Building is a historic commercial building at 517 South Main Street in downtown Stuttgart, Arkansas. Constructed in 1926, the building is in the Spanish Revival style, with a tile roof and glazed brick façade. The company manufactured blocks of ice for commercial and residential use, and remained in business until 1978. As household refrigerators became widespread, the facility was used to freeze and pack strawberries, as well as process and freeze ducks killed by local hunters.

The building was listed on the National Register of Historic Places in 1979.

== See also ==
- List of ice companies
- National Register of Historic Places listings in Arkansas County, Arkansas
