= Mission patch =

Spaceflight mission emblem worn by astronauts

A mission patch is a cloth reproduction of a spaceflight mission emblem worn by astronauts and other personnel affiliated with that mission. It is usually executed as an embroidered patch. The term space patch is mostly applied to an emblem designed for a crewed space mission. Traditionally, the patch is worn on the space suit that astronauts and cosmonauts wear when launched into space. Mission patches have been adopted by the crew and personnel of many other space ventures, public and private.

== Origins ==
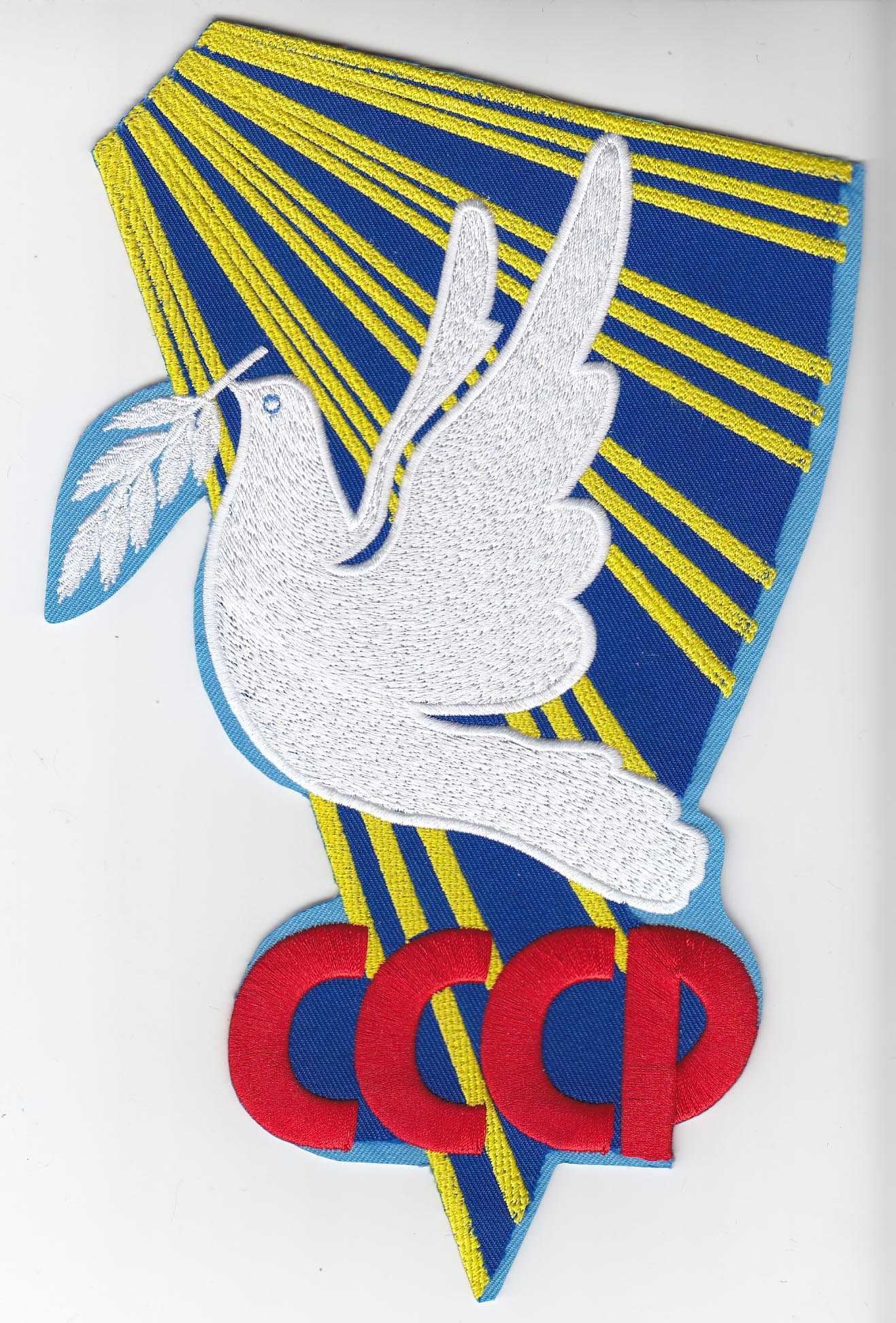
Vostok 6 mission insignia

The idea of creating distinctive patches for military missions or units began during the US Civil War, when the Army of the Potomac introduced special insignias to distinguish its corps and divisions. This practice faded after General Robert E. Lee surrendered at Appomattox and the army disbanded. However, the tradition was brought back with the onset of World War I and has since become widespread across all branches of the military, used in both wartime and peacetime.

The first space patch was flown by Soviet cosmonaut Valentina Tereshkova on the Vostok 6 mission in 1963; however, that was hidden from public view by the bright orange coverall that was part of the space suit at the time. At the start of the human spaceflight space age, as a rule, astronauts were pilots from a military background. These pilots took the tradition of military shoulder patches with them; most US space missions have had dedicated designs, and since the mid-1980s most Soviet/Russian flights also featured space patches. Mission patches were first sported by NASA astronauts in 1965. The idea was first introduced to NASA by Air Force pilot (and astronaut) Gordon Cooper.

== Evolution ==
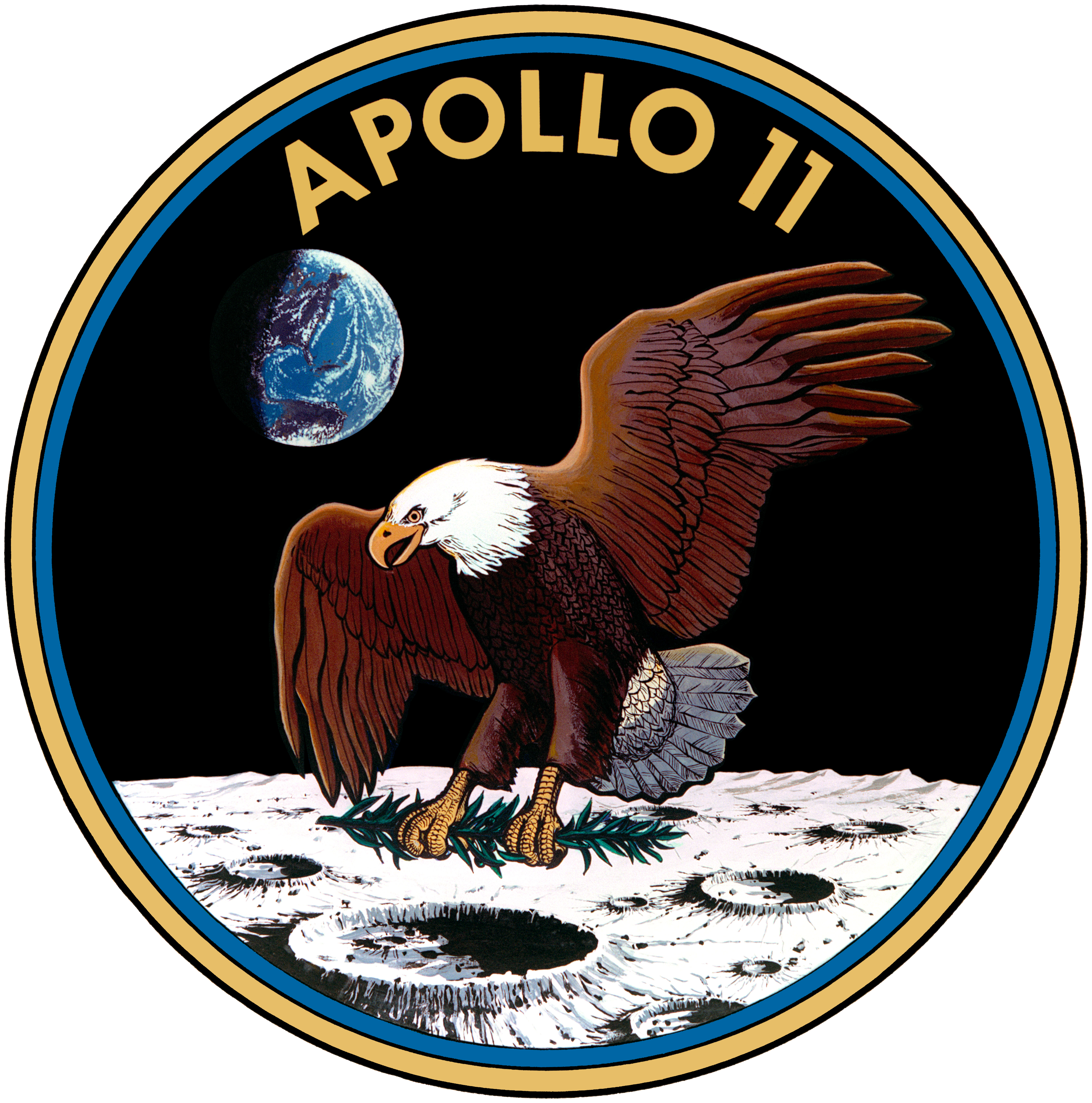
Apollo 11 mission insignia

Following the loss of the Apollo 1 crew in a devastating fire, embroidered patches were restricted from crew clothing. Instead, astronauts in flight wore mission patches of fire-resistant Beta cloth onto which designs were silkscreened. (Embroidered patches were still produced for ground side wear, non-flight personnel, sale to collectors and to be flown in space as souvenirs.)

=== In the Soviet Union/Russia ===
The Vostok-6 patch was the only one of that program. The first spacewalker, Alexei Leonov wore a general patch on his EVA representing a rocket taking off Earth, which was also used on subsequent flights. As part of the Interkosmos program, the crewed flights to the Salyut and Mir space stations between 1978 and 1988 featured mission logos. After that, some international flights had a patch, but only from 1994 onward did every Russian crewed launch feature a space patch. At that time, the design and production of the patches was done on the initiative of the crew; the designs were not sanctioned by the Russian space agency (Glavkosmos/RKA/Roscosmos). On a few confusing occasions, that lead to two 'crew-approved' patches existing for a single mission. The first agency-approved Russian space patch was the one for Soyuz TMA-13. However, Roscosmos was very late in announcing the design, by which time the crew had already produced their own version; the official design was not worn on the crew's suits. Since Soyuz TMA-14 in 2009, all launches feature 'official' patches.

=== In the United States ===
Early crewed NASA missions lacked patches; instead, the astronauts gave their spacecraft names. (Alan Shepard's capsule for Mercury 3 was named Freedom 7, for instance.) When Gus Grissom proposed to name his Gemini 3 capsule Molly Brown—a reference to The Unsinkable Molly Brown, referring in turn to Grissom's Mercury 4 capsule which sank in the ocean shortly after splashdown – NASA officials were nonplussed and they abolished the practice of naming capsules.

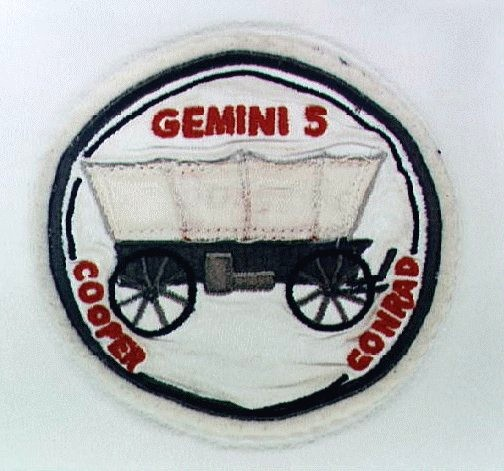
Gordon Cooper's Gemini 5 mission patch; NASA's first crewed patch

This prompted astronaut Gordon Cooper to propose and develop a mission patch for his and Pete Conrad's 1965 Gemini 5 flight: an embroidered cloth patch sporting the names of the two crew members, a covered wagon, and the slogan "8 Days or Bust" which referred to the expected mission duration. NASA administrator James E. Webb approved the design, but insisted on the removal of the slogan from the official version of the patch. The so-called Cooper patch was worn on the right breast of the astronauts' uniforms below their nameplates and opposite the NASA emblems worn on the left.

Since Gemini 5, patches have been created for all NASA crewed missions and many uncrewed expeditions. Patches are now created by professional graphic designers, but the design is still directed by each astronaut crew. They are designed and manufactured by A-B Emblem in North Carolina.

Since Gemini 5, every NASA crewed space mission had its own patch; 8 designs for Gemini, 12 for Apollo, 3 for Skylab, 1 for the Apollo-Soyuz Test Project (ASTP), 135 for the Space Shuttle program, and 12 for SpaceX (NASA Commercial Crew Program).

=== In Europe ===
Although European human spaceflight, performed by ESA, is dependent on US or Russian launches, most European astronauts have worn a patch designed for their particular mission (apart from some of the earlier Shuttle flights, when ESA astronauts wore the same crew patches as their NASA colleagues). ESA patches are designed either by the agency's graphics teams or occasionally by members of the public through competitions organized by ESA. ESA maintains a patch gallery of every patch worn by its astronauts.

=== China ===
In 2003, China launched its first taikonaut, Yang Liwei aboard Shenzhou 5. Following the US and Soviet/Russian tradition, he had a mission patch on his pressure suit. The crewed Shenzhou-6, -7 and -9 missions continued the tradition. In a departure from US and Russian designs, the Chinese mission patches do not feature crew names.

== Categories ==
- Mission patch or crew patch; designed for a single crewed space mission.
- Payload patch; designed for a particular payload carried on board a Space Shuttle mission.
- ISS expedition patch; designed for the expedition of a crew on board the International Space Station; these crews wear a separate patch for the Shuttle or Soyuz mission that takes them to the station.
- Project patch; designed for a program of experiments on board a space station, like ESA designs for missions on Mir and ISS; also for a program of spaceflights, like the Space Shuttle program logo.
- Agency patch; depicting the logo of a space agency, like the NASA 'meatball' and the ESA 'thumbprint' (or the ESA 'flags' patch).
- Personal patch; designed for an individual astronaut or cosmonaut, for use on one or more space missions. Usually, the patch is not publicized.
- Astronaut/cosmonaut group patch; features the logo of a selection of one particular 'class' of astronauts/cosmonauts, usually including the year of selection.
- Uncrewed and commemorative patches; many patches feature rockets, satellites, spaceships, the Moon, planets or stars, but some collectors do not consider these 'true' space patches.

== Artists ==
Early American patch designs were dominated by artists employed by spacecraft contractors McDonnell Aircraft (later McDonnell Douglas) and North American Aviation (later North American Rockwell) — these included Anthony Tharenos, Allen Stevens and Jean Pinataro. Later, NASA and NASA contractor artists contributed designs and final artwork — these included Jean Beaulieu, William Bradley, James Cooper, Victor Craft, Jerry Elmore, Barbara Matelski, and Norman Tiller.

Professional artists were commissioned in a few cases — Lumen Martin Winter, Emilio Pucci, Frank Kelly Freas and Robert McCall.

During the Shuttle and ISS era, a great many artists contributed designs, but two NASA contract artists dominated the field — Sean Collins and David Russell.

Most early Soviet/Russian patches were designed by artists that remain anonymous. In the 90s, Dmitri Shcherbinin and Alex Panchenko provided designs for Soyuz missions and personal patches. Russian designs for Soyuz TMA-14 through TMA-03M included art done by children, submitted to Roscosmos as part of a competition. More recently Tim Gagnon of the US and Jorge Cartes of Spain designed Shuttle and ISS expedition patches, while Luc van den Abeelen and Erik van der Hoorn, both of the Netherlands, provided art for Russian Soyuz missions to ISS. Additionally, Johnson Space Center graphic designer Blake Dumesnil has also worked closely with ISS crews on expedition mission patches, Soyuz patches, and personal crew patches, in addition to official NASA commemorative designs for the end of the Space Shuttle Program and the 50th Anniversary of Extravehicular Activities (EVAs).

== Collecting ==
Space patch collecting is done by a modest group of people worldwide, trying to keep up with new releases while searching for vintage examples of early mission patches, some now nearly 60 years old. Since 1971, all official NASA mission patches have been produced by a single supplier: A-B Emblem of Weaverville, North Carolina. As a result, most mission patches since Apollo have been widely available to the public. But a number of years ago, the company switched embroidery machines, and recent versions of older Shuttle patches differ from the originals, making the latter more interesting to serious collectors. Original Soviet-era patches and early Russian ones were either never available to the public or in very limited numbers. Since 2009, the supplier of Soyuz patches has modest numbers of patches available for collectors. The Chinese crew patches are very scarce and mostly only obtained through contacts within the Chinese aerospace industry. ESA patches were only made in limited numbers for PR events, but since 2012 the agency has moved to make its mission patches more widely available to the public from their original providers (Quadrotem in Germany, Emblemen in the Netherlands and Stewart Aviation in UK).

== See also ==
- Astronaut badge
