= Patch collecting =

Hobby of collecting patches or badges

A patch board

Patch collecting or badge collecting (aka scutelliphily, from Latin scutellus meaning little shield, and Greek phileein meaning to love) is the hobby of collecting patches or badges.

Types of patches collected may include commercial products, military insignia, and law enforcement insignia.

Patch collecting has a history dating back to at least World War II.

== See also ==
- Flag patch
- Militaria
