= Metz Ice Plant =

- U.S. National Register of Historic Places
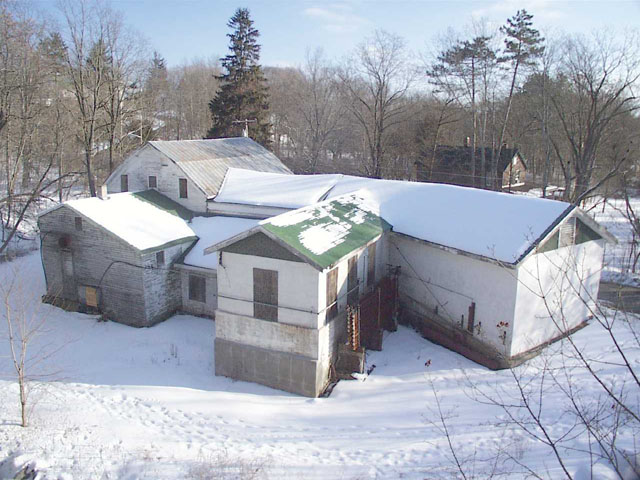
- Metz Ice Plant, February 2008

- Location within Pennsylvania Location within the United States
- Location: Harford St., Milford, Pennsylvania
- Coordinates: 41°19′2″N 74°47′59″W
- Area: 9.1 acres (3.7 ha)
- Built: 1869, 1924
- Architectural style: Italianate
- NRHP reference No.: 07001206
- Added to NRHP: November 19, 2007

The Metz Ice Plant, also known as the Jacob Klaer Gristmill and the Milford Ice and Refrigeration Company, is an historic ice manufacturing plant in the Delaware Water Gap National Recreation Area in Milford, Pike County, Pennsylvania, United States.

It was added to the National Register of Historic Places in 2007.

== History and architectural features ==
This historic structure is a late-nineteenth century grist mill that was converted to an ice manufacturing plant. The oldest section, which was built in 1869, is a 1 1/2-story, wood-frame building with a gambrel roof. Attached to it are two wood frame additions, the first of which was built between 1903 and 1927. Five smaller additions of concrete block construction were built between 1927 and 1950. Also extant is a penstock that carried water to the plant. The former grist mill was converted into an ice plant between 1924 and 1930. It remained in operation into the 1950s.

== See also ==
- List of ice companies
