= Rudolf Markgraf =

German architect

Rudolf Markgraf (November 5, 1860 – April 27, 1925) was an architect in the United States. Two buildings he designed are listed in the National Register of Historic Places and a third is a National Landmark.

He was born and educated in Germany. He married and had three daughters. He died on April 27, 1925.

== Work ==
- Dr. Generous Henderson House at 1016 The Paseo in Kansas City, Missouri, listed on the National Register of Historic Places
- Mutual Ice Company Building at 4142-4144 Pennsylvania Avenue in Kansas City (MO), listed on the National Register of Historic Places
- Mutual Musicians' Foundation Building at 1823 Highland Avenue in Kansas City, a National Landmark
