= American Ice Company Baltimore Plant No. 2 =

- U.S. National Register of Historic Places
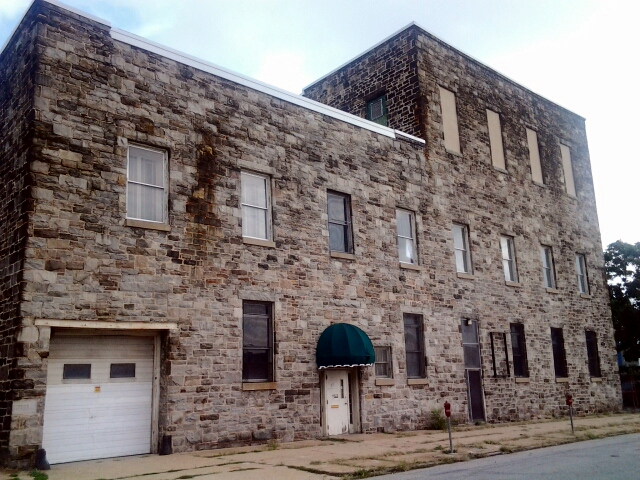
- American Ice Company Baltimore Plant No. 2, September 2012

- Location within Baltimore Location within Maryland Location within the United States
- Location: 330 W. 23rd St., Baltimore, Maryland
- Coordinates: 39°18′55.3″N 76°37′18.1″W
- Area: 1.2 acres (0.49 ha)
- Built: 1905
- NRHP reference No.: 02001589
- Added to NRHP: December 27, 2002

American Ice Company Baltimore Plant No. 2 is a historic ice manufacturing plant located at Baltimore, Maryland, United States. It consists of two industrial buildings: an original two story stone ice manufacturing building built in 1905 and a brick ice storage addition, built in 1919, is an immense, nearly windowless structure with the height of a six-story building.

American Ice Company Baltimore Plant No. 2 was listed on the National Register of Historic Places in 2002.

== See also ==
- American Ice Company
- List of ice companies
