= Grimsby Ice Factory =

Former factory in Lincolnshire, England

Coordinates: 53.5773°N 0.0713°W

External videos
- Great Grimsby Ice Factory Trust. TV4Change.

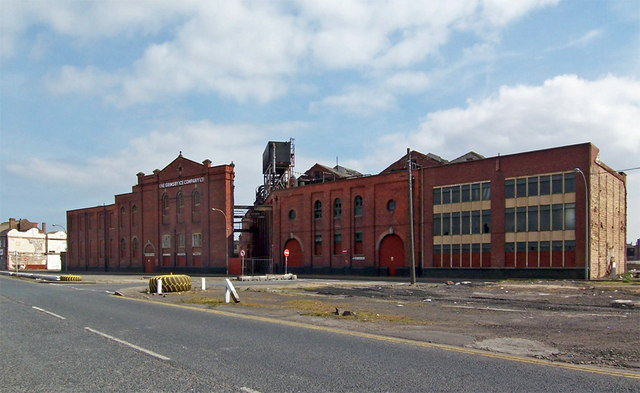
The Grimsby Ice Factory in Grimsby, England was built in 1900

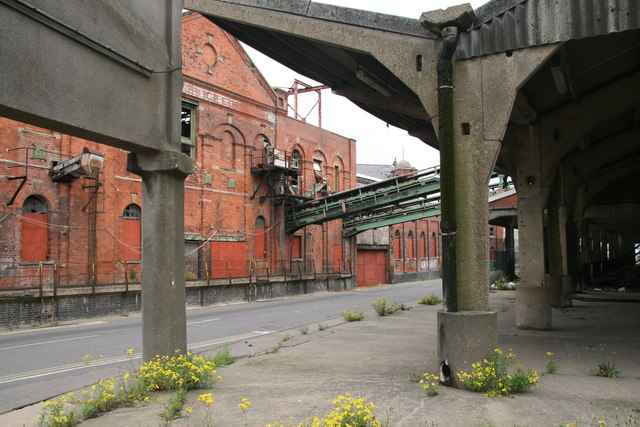
The rear of the former Ice Factory and the now derelict concrete fish market (right), 2008

The Grimsby Ice Factory is a former factory located in Grimsby, England, that was constructed from 1898–1901 to provide crushed ice to preserve fish stored in ships at Grimsby's seaport. The Grimsby Ice Factory engaged in operations up to 1990. The buildings still contain some of the original historic machinery from times of the operations' origins. During its time of prime operations, it produced 1,200 tonnes of ice daily. The building is 4,350 square metres in size, and at one time it was the largest ice factory in the world. The building is deteriorating, and it has been stated that it will eventually crumble if restoration efforts are not undertaken. Furthermore, historic machinery at the site is at risk from exposure to the elements, because the roof is not watertight.

== Operations ==
The factory used four Pontifex ammonia compressors that were powered by steam produced from Lancashire boilers. Ice production increased in 1933, when electrical generators replaced the steam power source. Upon the introduction of electricity, two Linde ammonia compressors that were being used were replaced with "four four-cylinder vertical valve ammonia compressors" manufactured by J & E Hall. These latter J & E Hall compressors remain inside the building today, and have been described as "the sole surviving example of this type of equipment".

The factory used a system of metal cans filled with water that were lowered into a tank filled with a calcium chloride brine solution. The brine solution was cooled by coils within the tanks, which were filled with a liquid ammonia refrigerant. After ice formed in the cans, they were placed in a thawing tank, after which the ice would separate from the cans and float to the top. The ice was then crushed and delivered to trawlers at Grimsby's seaport.

Grimsby Ice Factory operations

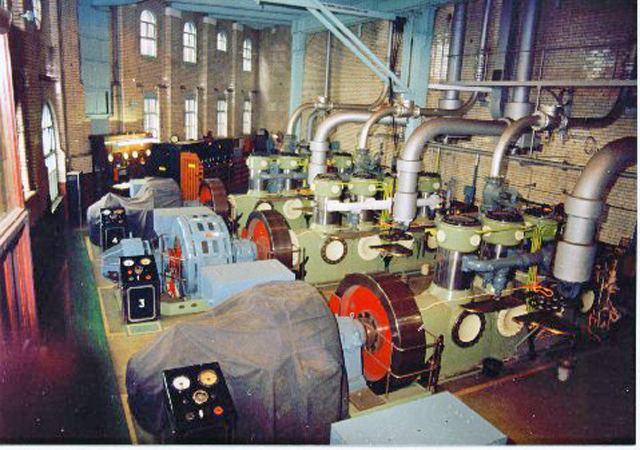
Compressors at the factory in 1990

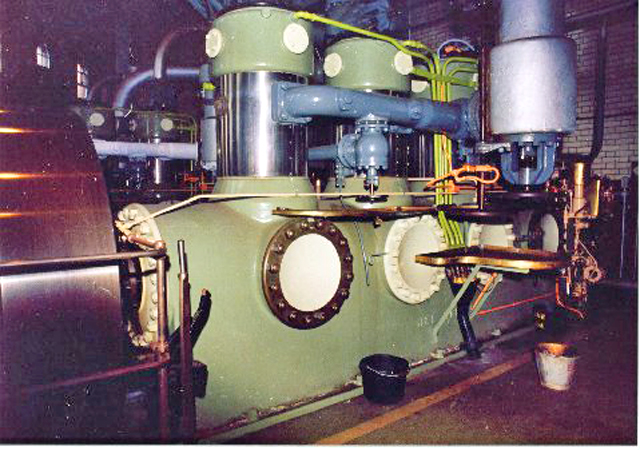
A close-up view of a compressor at the factory in 1990

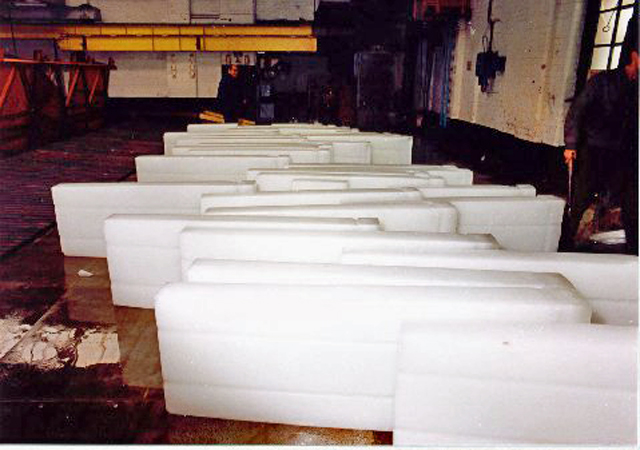
Slabs of manufactured ice at the factory prior to being crushed, 1990

== Historical significance ==
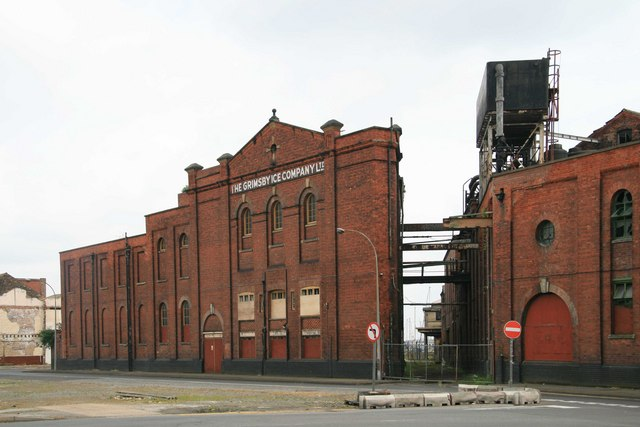
Another view of the Grimsby Ice Factory in 2008

The structure and equipment at the Grimsby Ice Factory site is an important part of Grimsby's fishing heritage. It is a Grade II* listed building that is owned by Associated British Ports. It has been stated that some of the most important and largest refrigeration machinery in the world exists there, and that at one time, Grimsby "was the busiest fishing port in the world". It has been added to the World Monument Fund's biannual World Monuments Watch list, a global list of "buildings of historical importance that are risk of being lost to the elements". The structure has been considered as "the oldest and largest surviving of its type in the world". Furthermore, the building has been listed on the 'Heritage At Risk Register', managed by the English Heritage, an executive non-departmental public body of the British Government, since 2008. In 2018, it was included in Europa Nostra's shortlist of at-risk European cultural landmarks.

== In contemporary times ==
In March 2015, Grimsby residents suggested that the factory be covered to hide it from view during the upcoming World Seafood Congress event in September, with the rationale that the deteriorating building could denigrate the town's image. Graeme Bassett, secretary of the Great Grimsby Ice Factory Trust, suggested that the building could be covered temporarily or that scaffolding could be erected as a solution regarding concerns about the site being an eyesore.

=== Great Grimsby Ice Factory Trust ===
As of May 2014, Great Grimsby Ice Factory Trust had plans to restore and renovate the site into a leisure complex that would include a pub, cinema and climbing wall. Part of the trust's plan included retaining the machinery on the site for historical purposes. In 2014, the trust attempted to obtain £11 million from the Heritage Lottery Fund, but the request was denied. The site has been owned since 2021 by developer Tom Shutes' company GY 1900 Ltd.

== See also ==
- List of ice companies
- Iceman (occupation)
