= The Last of the Blue Devils =

1979 American documentary film

The Last of the Blue Devils, subtitled The Kansas City Jazz Story, is a 1979 film documentary with notable figures from the history of Kansas City jazz starring Count Basie and Big Joe Turner. The film was produced and directed by Bruce Ricker.

The film was made at two musical gatherings of old Kansas City hands in 1974 at the Mutual Musicians Foundation, the Kansas City African-American Musician's Union, and consists largely of impromptu musical performances by Turner, Basie, Jay McShann, Jimmy Forrest, and Ernie Williams in various combinations, as well as film from a concert by the full Count Basie Orchestra at the University of Kansas in Lawrence.

The Blue Devils of the title were the Oklahoma City Blue Devils a travelling band of the 1930s founded by bassist Walter Page that included Basie, Lester Young, Buster Smith and Oran "Hot Lips" Page. Many of the same musicians ended up in the Bennie Moten Orchestra which ultimately became the Count Basie band.

Songs in the film include "One O'Clock Jump", "Honey Hush", "Rose Garden", "Chains of Love", "Shake, Rattle and Roll", and a performance by the Basie Orchestra of "Night Train" featuring a lengthy improvisation on tenor saxophone by the song's writer, Jimmy Forrest.
