= Mutual Ice Company Building =

- U.S. National Register of Historic Places
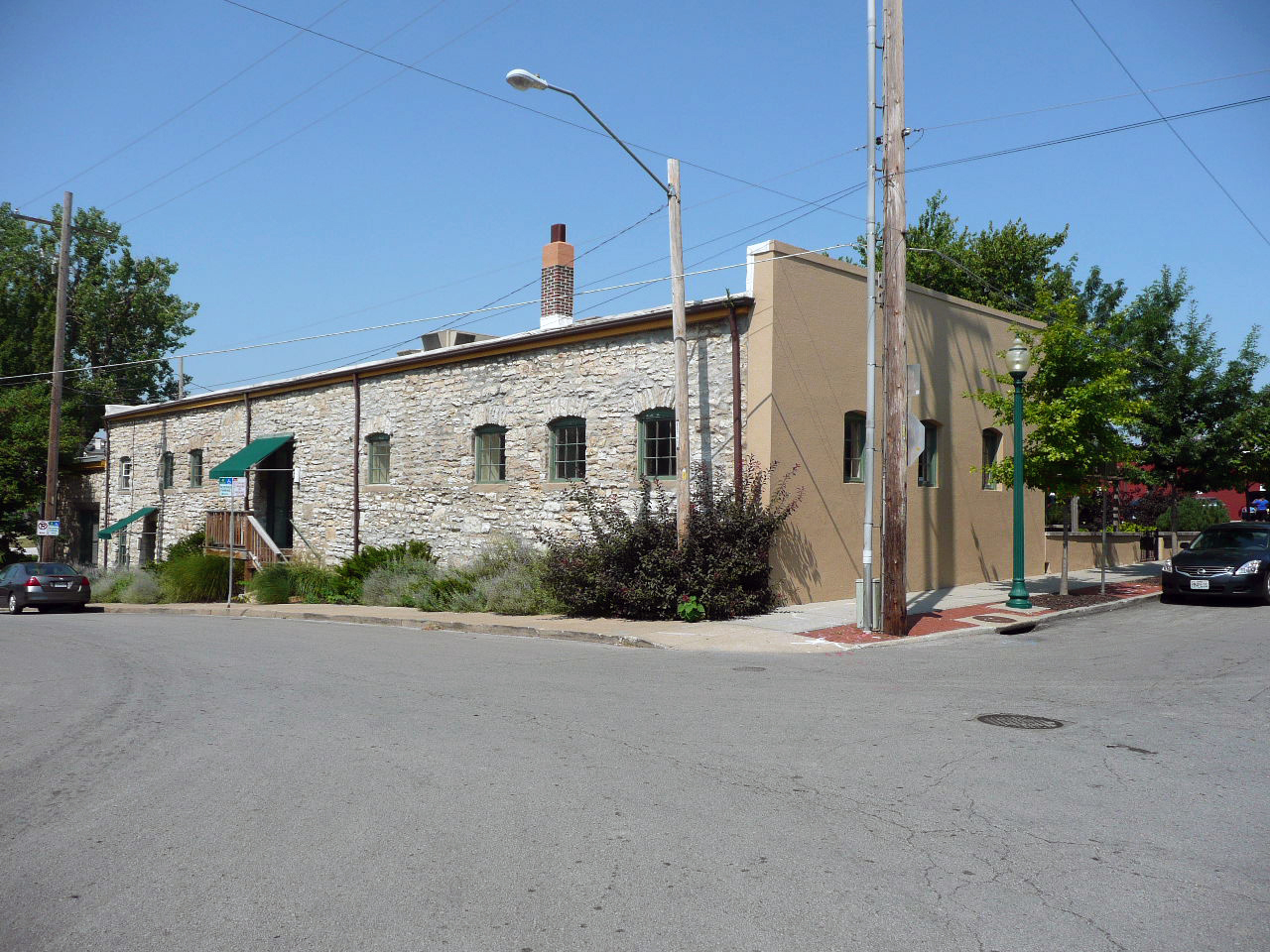

- Location within Missouri Location within the United States
- Location: 4142-4144 Pennsylvania Ave., Kansas City, Missouri
- Coordinates: 39°3′11″N 94°35′26″W
- Area: less than one acre
- Built: 1907
- Architect: Rudolf Markgraf
- NRHP reference No.: 04000783
- Added to NRHP: August 4, 2004

The Mutual Ice Company Building in Westport, Kansas City, Missouri is a building from 1907. It was listed on the National Register of Historic Places in 2004.

== See also ==
- List of ice companies
