= A-B Emblem =

- Founded: 1944
- Headquarters: Weaverville, North Carolina, United States
- Key people: Benhard Conrad, President
- Parent: Conrad Industries
- Website: www.abemblem.com

A-B Emblem is a manufacturer of emblems and patches for military, government, corporate and organizations. The company began as a manufacturer of military emblems in World War II.

The company began producing mission patches for NASA in 1969 for Apollo 11 and has been the sole contractor for NASA mission patches since 1971. Mission commanders have visited the western North Carolina facility to participate in design on the mission logo. The company also manufactures emblems and pins for Scouting America and Girl Scouts of the USA

The company also produces patches and emblems for police, fire and other emergency services organizations as well as corporate applications and souvenirs sold in gift shops.
