= Franklintown Historic District =

Historic district in Maryland, United States

- U.S. National Register of Historic Places
- U.S. Historic district
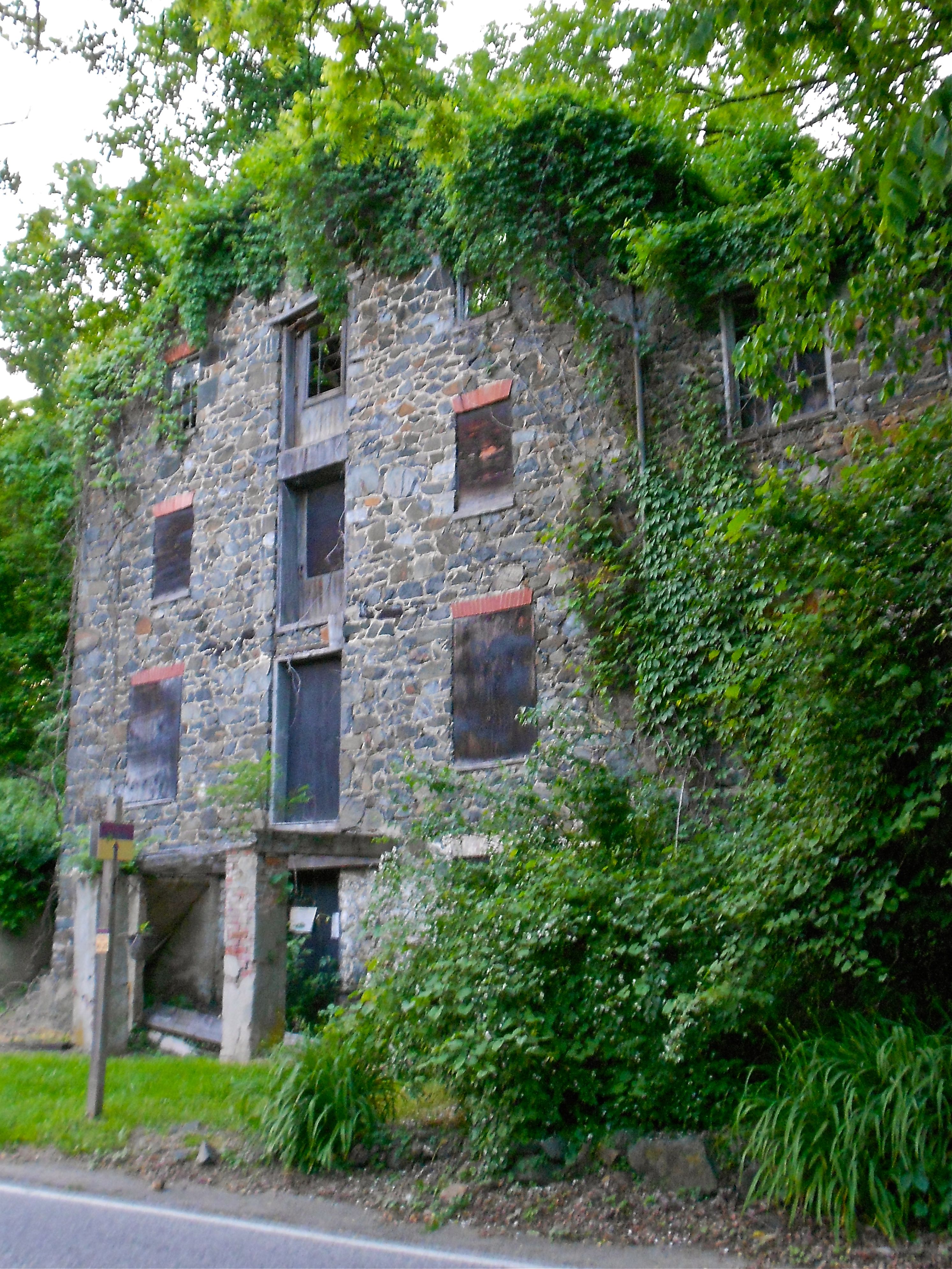
- Old grist mill on Franklintown Road

- Location within Baltimore Location within Maryland Location within the United States
- Location: 5100-5201 N. Franklintown Rd.;1707-1809 N. Forest Park Ave., 5100 Hamilton Ave., 5100 Fredwall Ave., Baltimore, Maryland
- Coordinates: 39°18′16″N 76°42′35″W
- Area: 15.5 acres (6.3 ha)
- Built: 1826
- Architect: Freeman, William H.
- Architectural style: Mid 19th Century Revival
- NRHP reference No.: 01001214
- Added to NRHP: November 11, 2001

Franklintown Historic District is a national historic district in Baltimore, Maryland, United States. It is the result of a plan developed in 1832 by William H. Freeman (1790–1863), a local politician and entrepreneur, who intended to develop the area after noting the value of the recently-built Franklintown road. His plan involved the construction of the Franklintown inn and nearby Central Race Course to attract prominent visitors. The central feature is an oval plan with radiating lots around a central wooded park. The district includes an old fieldstone grist mill set on the banks of Dead Run stream known as Franklin Mill, the innovative radiating oval plan, and the associated hotel and commercial area. Franklin Mill was converted into a residential house in the 1950s. The key residential buildings are excellent examples of the "I"-house form and display steeply pitched cross gables found in vernacular rural buildings throughout much of Maryland.

Franklintown was added to the National Register of Historic Places in 2001.
