= Princeton Ice Company =

- U.S. National Register of Historic Places
- New Jersey Register of Historic Places
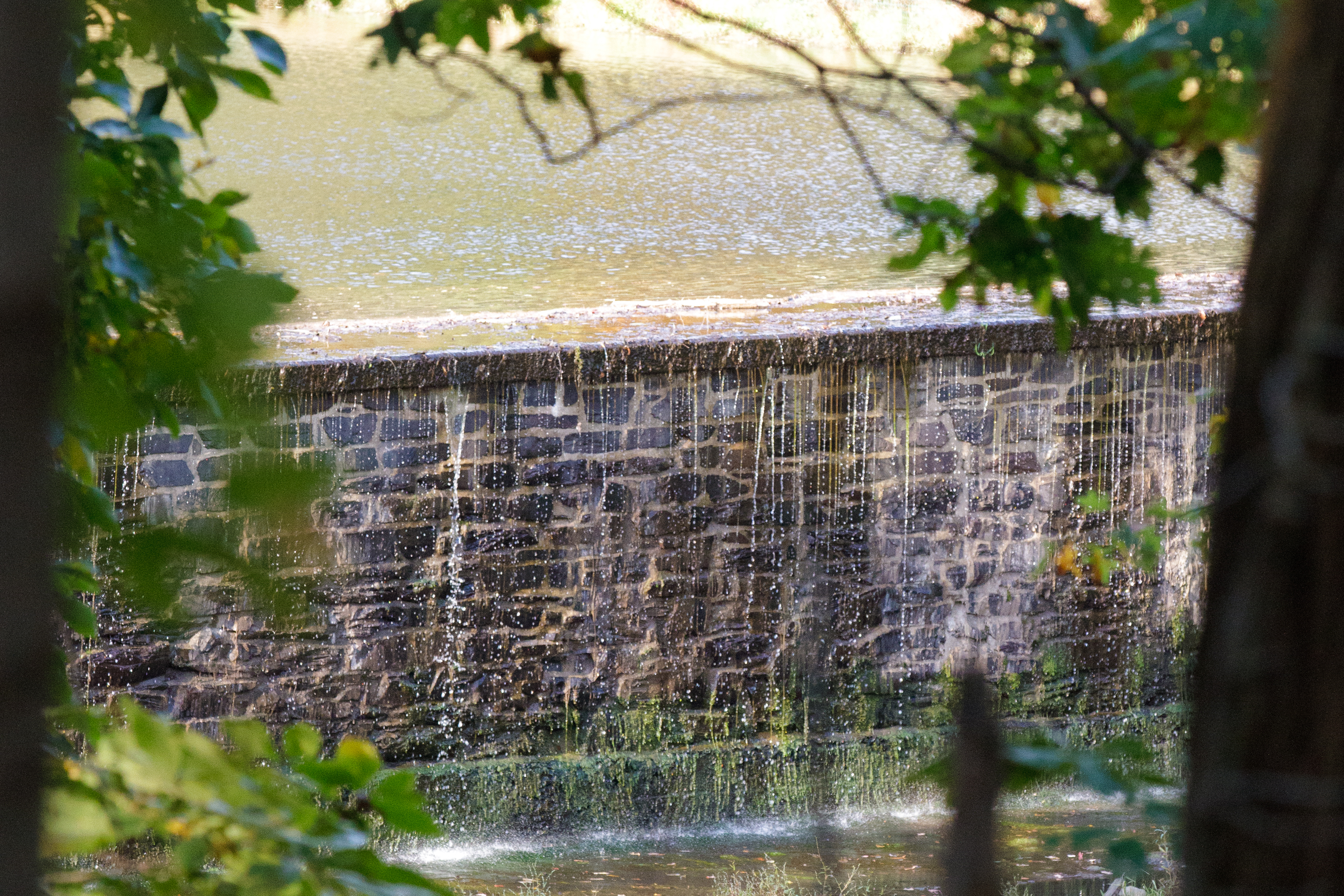
- The upper dam of the Princeton Ice Company, built 1902
- Location: 57 Mountain Avenue, Princeton, New Jersey 08540
- Coordinates: 40°21′46.1″N 74°40′37.5″W
- Area: 77 acres (31 ha)
- Built: 1884
- NRHP reference No.: 07000874
- NJRHP No.: 4716

Significant dates
- Added to NRHP: August 28, 2007
- Designated NJRHP: June 25, 2007

The Princeton Ice Company built a dam in 1884 on former farmland so as to allow for the production of ice for sale to residents and businesses in Princeton, New Jersey. This company was the primary supplier of ice to the town during the era of the frozen water trade before the advent of artificial refrigeration. In 1902 a second dam was added so as to increase ice production capacity. The company dissolved itself in 1929, after technological change rendered the ice trade obsolete. The nearly 77 acres (31 ha) site has gone undisturbed in the decades since, apart from the 1958 addition of a colonial revival home designed by noted local architect, Rolf Bauhan.

== Mountain Lakes Preserve ==
In 1987 the property was purchased for open space by Princeton Township and has since been known as the Mountain Lakes Preserve. None of the original buildings of the ice company are extant apart from foundations and a chimney. The former farm fields have reverted to forest. The house on the property is now home to the nonprofit, Friends of Princeton Open Space, and is used for wedding receptions and other events, the proceeds from which support the organization. The preserve is at the heart of the broader 400-acre Mountain Lakes Open Space Area, an interconnected network of trails and parks that includes views of Tusculum, the country estate of John Witherspoon, and historic Coventry Farm. In 2013 the town of Princeton received a Historic Preservation Award from the State of New Jersey Historic Preservation Office for the rehabilitation of the two dams on the site. An anonymous gift of $3 million was received to fund the rehabilitation.

== Gallery ==
Princeton Ice Company

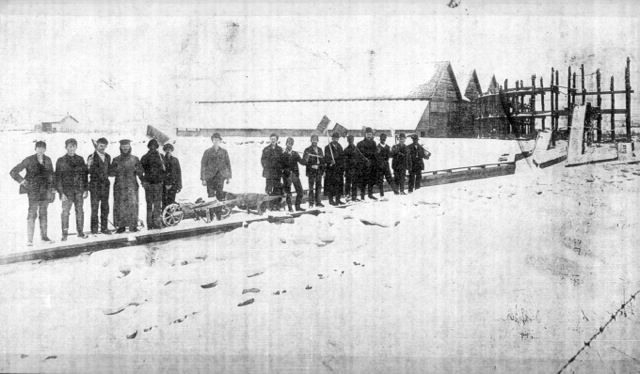
Ice cutters and ice houses at Mountains Lakes in 1910

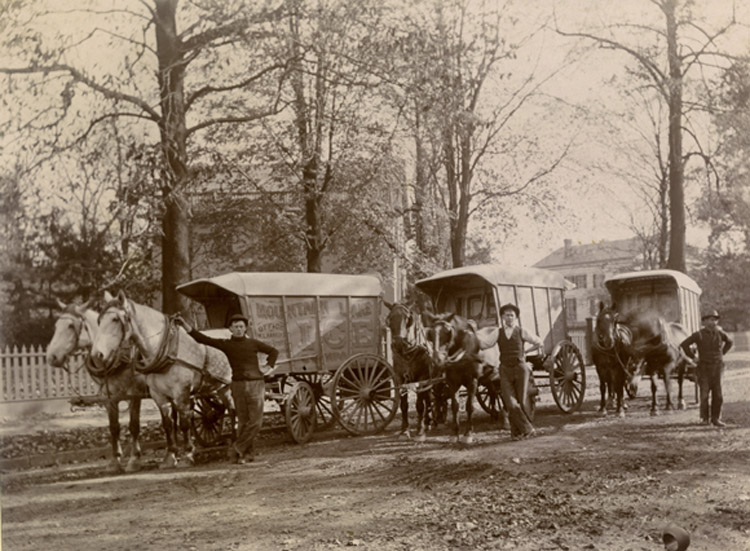
Three delivery wagons of the Princeton Ice Company
Mountain Lakes Preserve

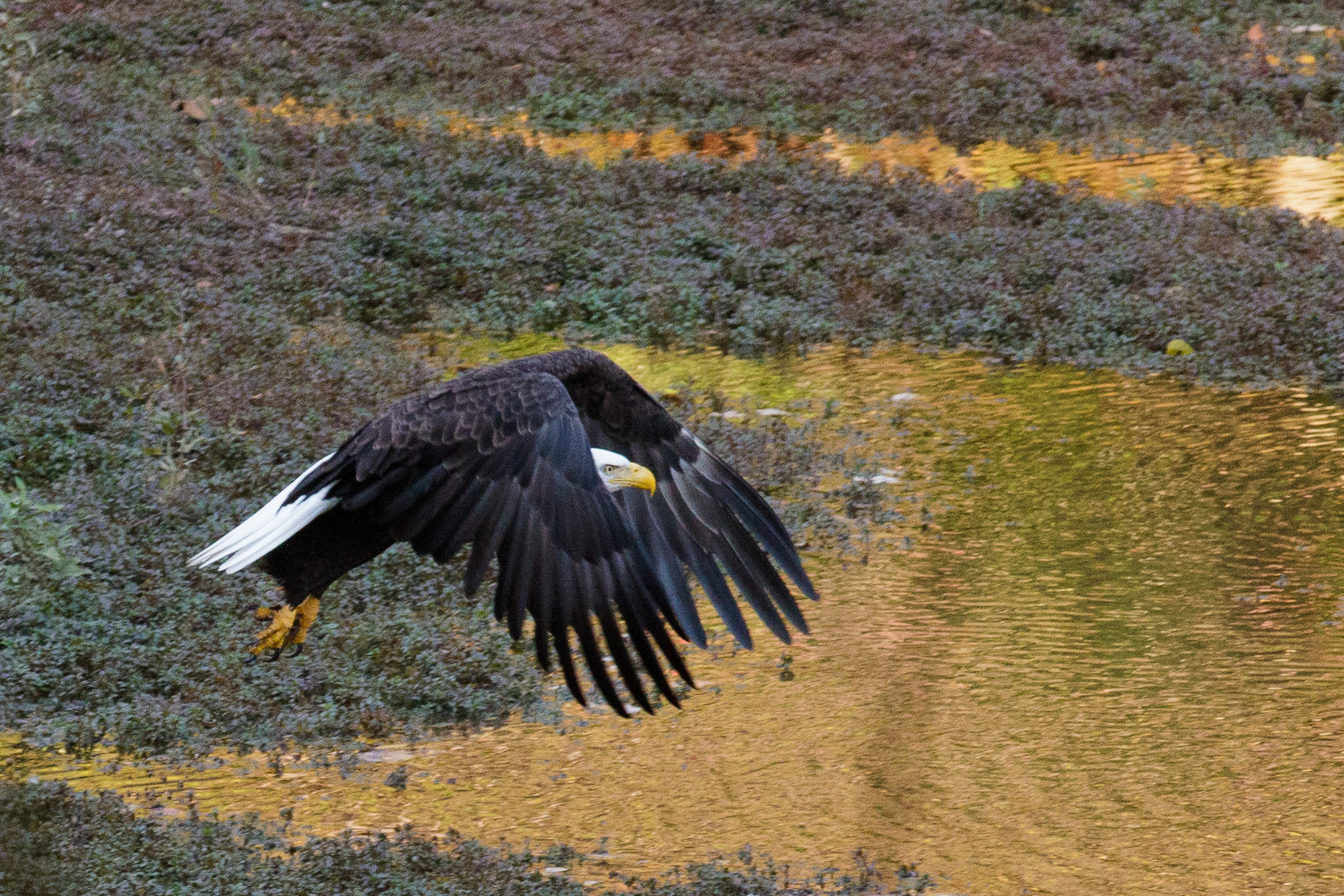
A bald eagle in flight at the Mountain Lakes Preserve

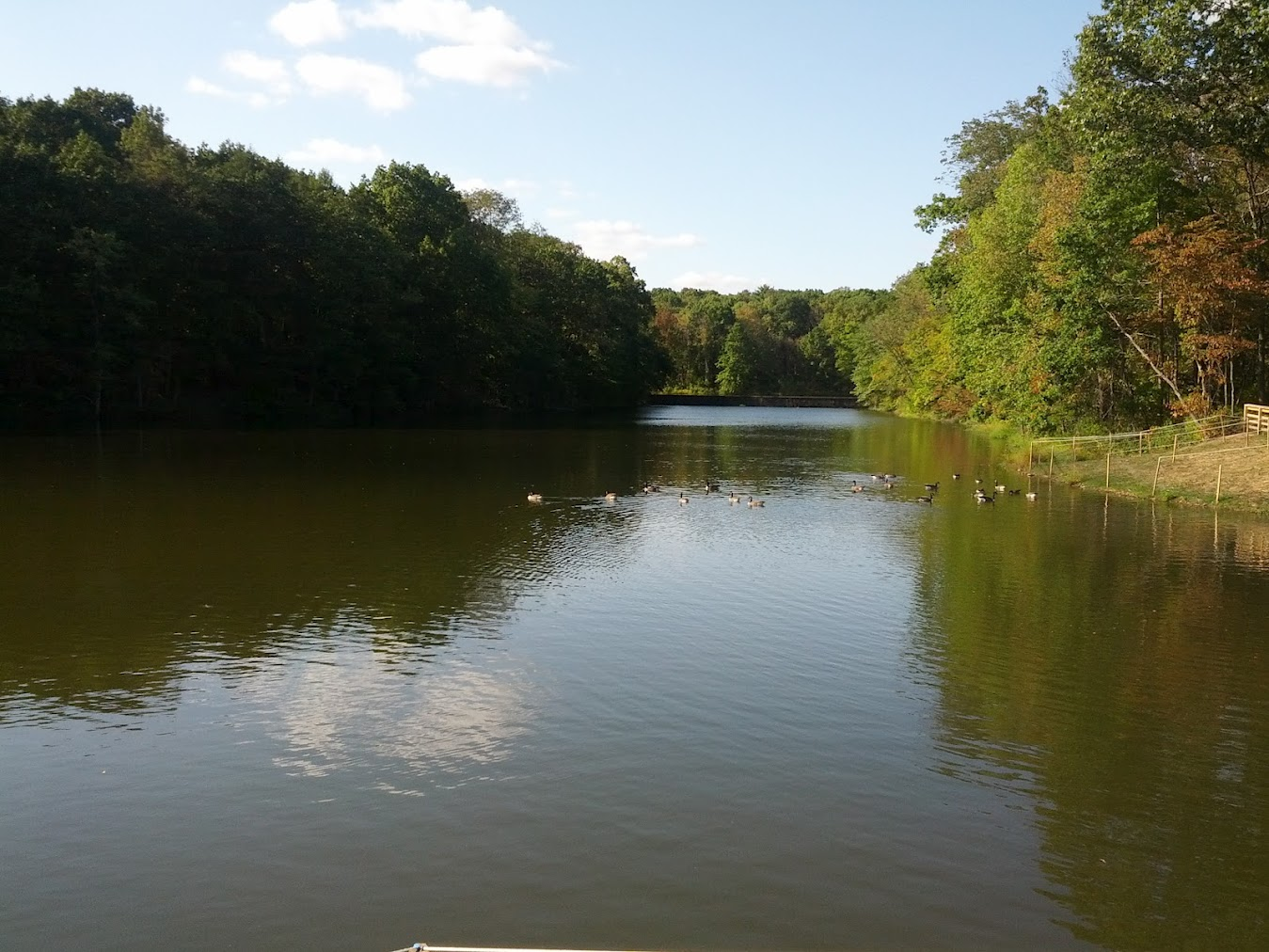
One of the lakes, created for the harvesting of ice

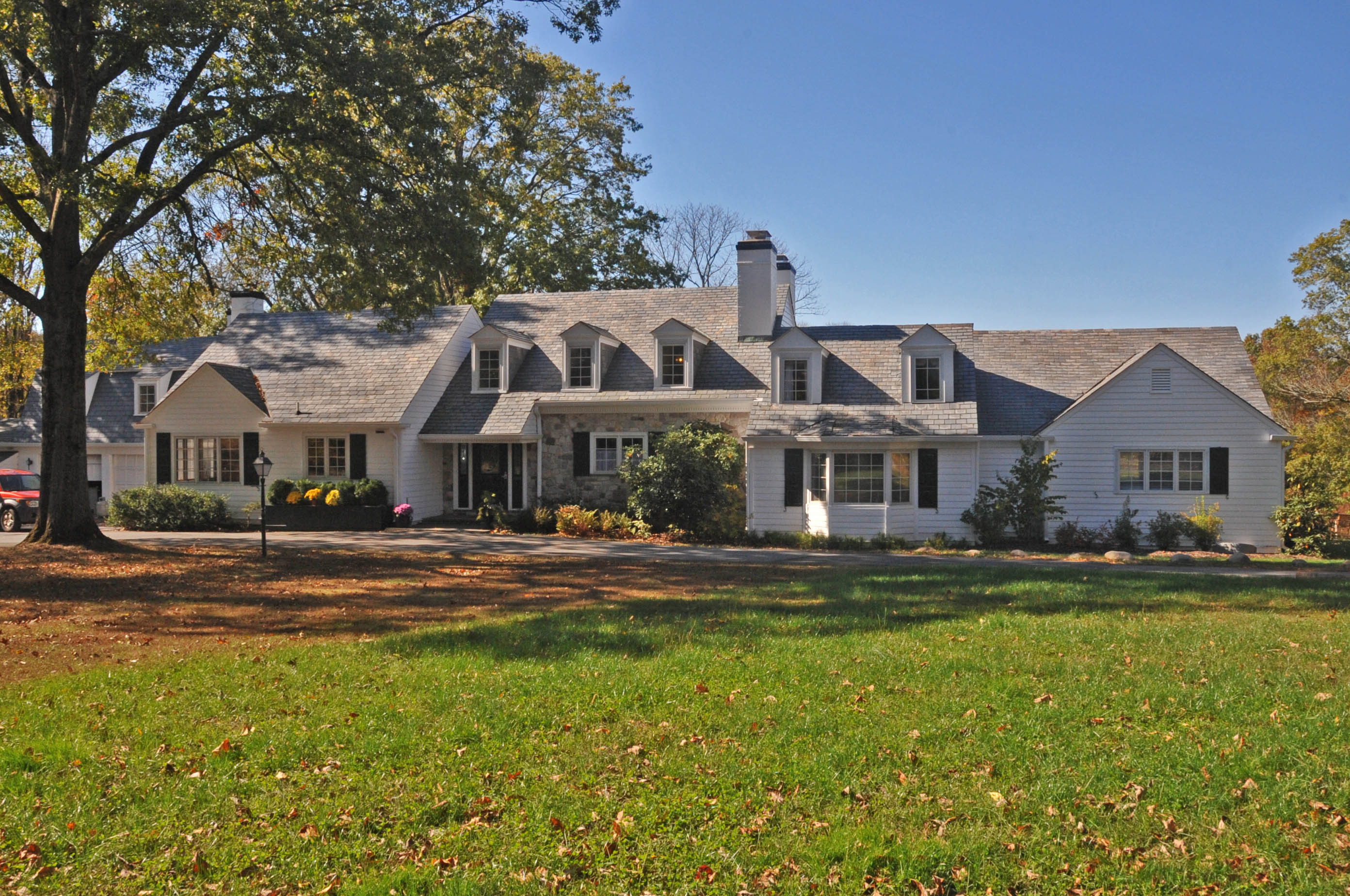
Mountain Lakes House, built 1958, used for wedding receptions

== See also ==
- National Register of Historic Places listings in Mercer County, New Jersey
