= Lion Brothers Company Building =

- U.S. National Register of Historic Places
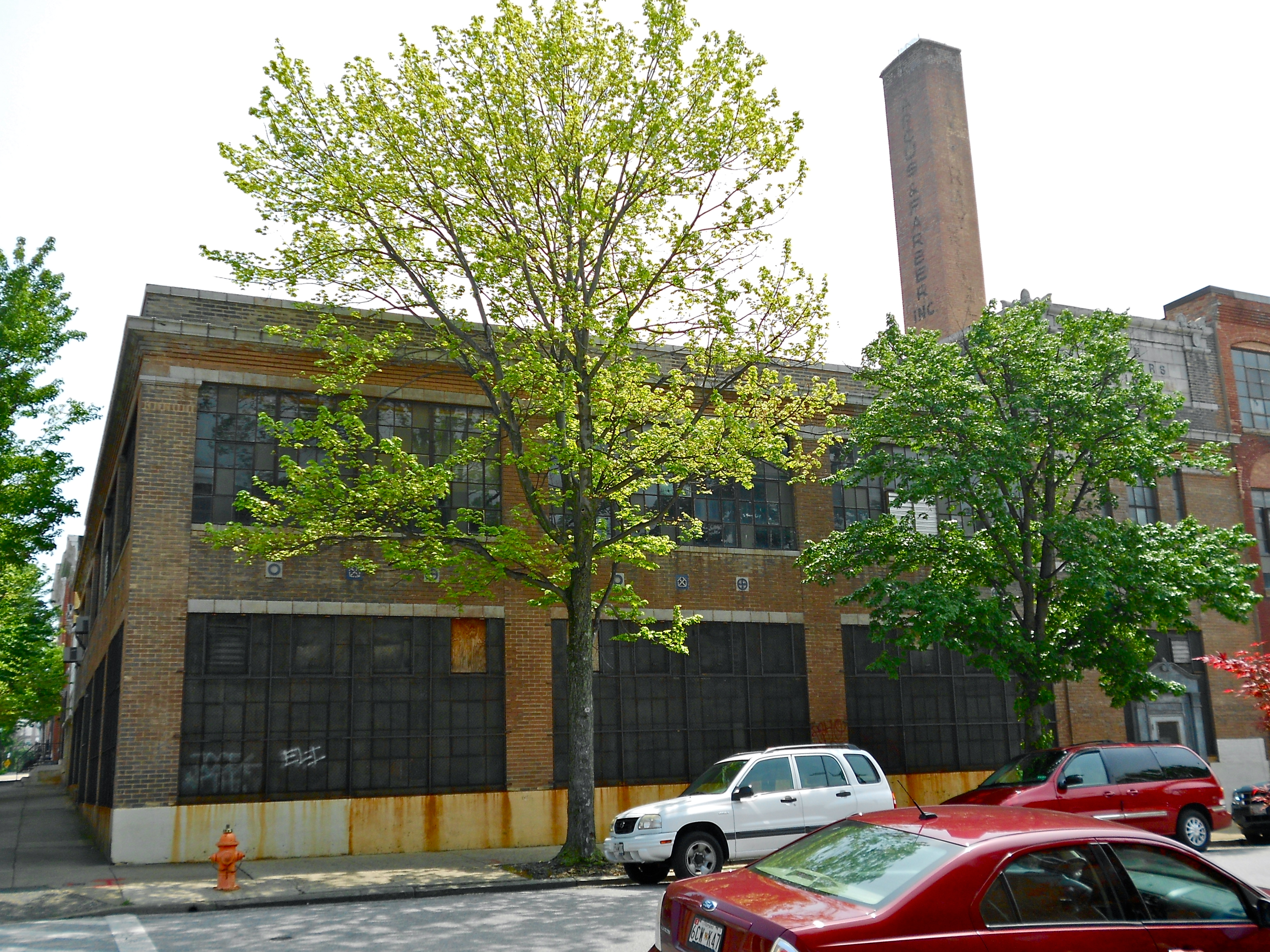
- Lion Brothers Company Building, May 2012

- Location within Baltimore Location within Maryland Location within the United States
- Location: 875 Hollins St., Baltimore, Maryland
- Coordinates: 39°17′22″N 76°37′54″W
- Area: 0.4 acres (0.16 ha)
- Built: 1885
- Architect: Smith & May; Price Constr.
- NRHP reference No.: 06000781
- Added to NRHP: December 7, 2006

Lion Brothers Company Building (also referred to as the Globe building) is a historic factory located at 875 Hollins St, Baltimore, Maryland 21201. It is a multi-level building that once housed the operations of the Lion Brothers embroidery company. The original building was constructed in 1885 and expanded several times over the subsequent 75 years. In 1958 the Lion Brothers moved their production facility to another location allowing Marcus & Farber and Globe Screen Printing to move in. The building has been vacant since 2002 and Cross Street Partners has plans to restore the building as a local innovation center.

== History ==
The Lion Brothers Company was established in 1899, and originally located in a loft building at 109 South Charles Street. At first, the company produced a wide range of products including blouses, skirts, and sailor caps. It was one clothing factory among many in an extensive garment industry in the western portion of downtown. Their factory was destroyed in the 1904 Baltimore Fire, causing them to relocate to 875 Hollins St. At the time, the building was occupied by the John Cowan livery stable and hall. Cowan was an undertaker with a funeral home across the street at 1901 Hollins Street.

Lion Brothers purchased the livery building in 1911, roughly the same time that all operations were concentrated on Hollins Street and the company was no longer producing finished clothing, but instead specializing in embroidered emblems. The location of the company in the Poppleton area of West Baltimore was a departure from other garment related industries centered in the downtown area. This location had several advantages: (1) it was removed from the heavily built up downtown area that had suffered the devastating 1904 fire; (2) an ample working-class labor pool surrounded the factory; (3) it was close to the factory's owners’ residences located in the vicinity of Eutaw Place; and (4) the production of embroidered emblems and insignias was a distinct specialty that did not require immediate proximity to other garment-related businesses.

The need for uniforms in the World War I era helped spur the growth and expansion of this company. By 1920, the company had outgrown the original three story building. Instead of relocating, they expanded to the north, eventually occupying nearly the entire block. An article in the Baltimore Evening Sun of January 14, 1920 announced the construction of the 1920 building, which doubled the plant capacity. The expansion made it the largest embroidery factory south of New York. Lion Brothers also purchased four sixteen-ton Sauer power looms for the enlarged facility for $72,000, nearly three times the cost of the new building.

The prominent Baltimore architectural firm Smith & May designed the new building, which was built by the Price Construction Company at an estimated cost of $25,000 and was ready for occupancy in June 1920. The ground floor was used primarily for manufacturing equipment, while the upper floor was used for drafting and design, and hand embroidery, taking full advantage of the natural lighting provided by the large exterior windows and roof monitors.

Within the next thirty years, the factory expanded three times. In 1935, an addition along Hollins Street virtually duplicated the 1920 addition. The 1983 addition on Boyd Street was similar to the earlier additions, but lacked the ceramic block insignia ornamentation and expansive column spacing of the earlier building. In 1948, an office and warehouse addition departed form the earlier design. This addition was announced in the July 1948 edition of Baltimore Magazine.

In 1958, the company moved to a six-acre site in Owings Mills in Baltimore County. By that time, the company was the largest manufacturer of embroidered emblems in the world and employed 250 people, and remained under the ownership of the Lion family. After Lion Brothers moved to Owings Mills, the building sold in 1961 to Marcus & Farber, a clothing manufacturer. The painted signs on the chimney identify this firm. In 1978, the building was sold to Leon Zimmerman, owner of Globe Screen Printing. In 2002, Globe vacated the building and move to Woodlawn in Baltimore County.

Lion Brothers Company Building was listed on the National Register of Historic Places in 2006.

In 2015, Cross Street Partners in affiliation with the University of Maryland BioPark and Innovation District planned to redevelop the structure for office and institutional space. In 2017, the University of Maryland, Baltimore County Intermedia and Digital Arts Graduate Program became one of the tenants of the complex.
