= List of United States post offices in Arkansas =

United States post offices operate under the authority of the United States Post Office Department (1792–1971) or the United States Postal Service (since 1971). Historically, post offices were usually placed in a prominent location. Many were architecturally distinctive, including notable buildings featuring Beaux-Arts, Art Deco, and Vernacular architecture. However, modern U.S. post offices were generally designed for functionality rather than architectural style.

Following is a list of United States post offices in Arkansas. Notable post offices include individual buildings, whether still in service or not, which have architectural, historical, or community-related significance. Many of these are listed on the National Register of Historic Places (NRHP) or state and local historic registers.

Post office	City	Date built	Image	Architect	Notes	Ref.
Berryville Post Office	Berryville	1938		Louis A. Simon	(Note: Listed on the National Register of Historic Places.)	
Old Camden Post Office	Camden	1895		Asa Morgan	(Note: No longer used as a post office.)	
Crossett Post Office	Crossett	1939		Louis A. Simon		
Dardanelle Agriculture and Post Office	Dardanelle	1938		Louis A. Simon, Neal A. Melick		
DeWitt Post Office	DeWitt	1939		Louis A. Simon		
Old Post Office	Fayetteville	1911		James Knox Taylor		
Judge Isaac C. Parker Federal Building	Fort Smith	1937		Louis A. Simon, Neal A. Melick		
Old Post Office	Hot Springs	1901		James Knox Taylor		
Lake Village Post Office	Lake Village	1938		Louis A. Simon		
Richard Sheppard Arnold United States Post Office and Courthouse	Little Rock	1932		James A. Wetmore, Louis A. Simon		
Old Post Office Building and Customhouse	Little Rock	1876–1881		James B. Hill		
Old Post Office	Mena	1917		James A. Wetmore		
Monticello Post Office	Monticello	1937		Louis A. Simon		
Morrilton Post Office	Morrilton	1936		Louis A. Simon		
North Little Rock Post Office	North Little Rock	1931		Charles L. Thompson		
Nashville Post Office	Nashville	1936–1937		Louis A. Simon, Algernon Blair		
Huddleston Store and McKinzie Store	Oden	1912		unknown		
Paris Post Office	Paris	1937		Louis A. Simon		
Piggott Post Office	Piggott	1937–1941		Dan Rhodes, Louis A. Simon		
Pine Ridge Post Office	Pine Ridge					
Pocahontas Post Office	Pocahontas	1936		F. L. Rice, T. Jarvis Co.		
Doe Branch Post Office	Pulaski County	1890		Noah Richards		
Searcy Post Office	Searcy	1914		Oscar Wenderoth		
Campbell Post Office–Kuykendall General Store	Searcy County	1900		unknown		
United States Post Office (Stuttgart, Arkansas)	Stuttgart	1931		James A. Wetmore		
United States Post Office and Courthouse (Texarkana, Arkansas–Texas)	Texarkana	1933		Perkins, Chatten & Hammond; James A. Wetmore; Witt, Seibert & Halsey		
Van Buren Post Office	Van Buren	1936		Louis A. Simon, Neal A. Melick		
Old Walnut Ridge Post Office	Walnut Ridge	1935		Louis A. Simon, Neal A. Melick		
Warren Post Office	Warren	1935		Louis A. Simon		
Wynne Post Office	Wynne	1936		Louis A. Simon, Neal A. Melick		
