= Gillett Coon Supper =

Dining event in the United States

- Status: Active
- Genre: Dinner
- Frequency: Annually
- Venue: Gillett High School
- Location: Gillett, Arkansas
- Coordinates: 34.1148°N 91.3827°W
- Country: United States
- Inaugurated: 1944
- Sponsor: Gillett Farmer's and Businessmen's Club

The Gillett Coon Supper is an annual event held in the Arkansas Delta community of Gillett, Arkansas. Wild game, namely raccoon, is served to a group of over a thousand attendees. The event, held in the former Gillett High School gymnasium every second weekend in January, devotes the proceeds toward scholarships for Gillett-area high school seniors.

The event has become a popular stop for those seeking statewide office in Arkansas. Notably, former Governor of Arkansas Bill Clinton attended multiple years. Marion Berry, former U.S. representative for Arkansas's 1st congressional district, also made numerous appearances.

== History ==
=== Origins ===
The first informal supper was served in 1933, and served mainly as a social event for hunters following their annual hunt. The event was stopped at the advent of World War II.

=== Organizing the supper ===
The first organized supper, based on the original meetups, was served in 1944 as a fundraiser for Gillett High School's football team. In the inaugural event, held in the high school's auditorium, the funds were raised to purchase the team jackets. Since its foundation in 1947, the town's Gillett Farmer's and Businessmen's Club, a non-profit organization, has put together the supper.

=== Rise in popularity ===
A 1985 Associated Press article estimated that between 1,000 and 1,200 people from across the state attended the event, with the population of Gillett at the time being 927 people. Tickets at the time cost $10 and around $10,000 was raised annually for the football team. In 1988, a ton of barbecued raccoon, 100 pounds of rice, 10 bushels of sweet potatoes, and 14 hams were prepared. Organizer Gene Holloway said that 100 members of the Farmer's and Businessmen's Club, along with "every woman in the community," were involved with the event that year.

In the wake of declining population, the Gillett School District consolidated into DeWitt School District in 2003. By 2009, Gillett High School closed and students were moved to DeWitt High School. The DeWitt School District, amid ambiguity on the future of the supper, decided to permit the continuation of the event, with funds raised going to scholarships for students residing within the original Gillett School District borders.

== Role in politics ==
Despite candidates not being able to make campaign speeches at the event, the supper has been referred to as a "must appearance" for politicians in Arkansas, being described as the "kickoff to Arkansas political campaign season" by the Arkansas Times and as a "veritable rite of passage for people seeking election to political office" by the Encyclopedia of Arkansas.

While travelling to the 1988 event in the middle of a heavy sleet storm, the airplane carrying Governor Bill Clinton and Arkansas' Senators Dale Bumpers and David Pryor skidded off of the runway and tipped on its side.

It's really reflective of rural Arkansas, out-of-Little Rock Arkansas. They introduce visiting politicians, it's real good fellowship, and whether you like the coon or not, you like the sociability."

— Bob Fisher, press secretary for Steve Clark

=== Notable attendees ===
- Bill Alexander, former U.S. representative for Arkansas's 1st congressional district (1969–1993)
- Marion Berry, former U.S. representative from Arkansas's 1st congressional district (1997–2011)
- Winston Bryant, former Secretary of State of Arkansas (1977–1979), Lieutenant Governor of Arkansas (1981–1991), and Arkansas Attorney General (1991–1999)
- Dale Bumpers, former Governor of Arkansas (1971–1975) and U.S. Senator (1975–1999)
- Steve Clark, former Arkansas Attorney General (1979–1990)
- Bill Clinton, former Governor of Arkansas (1983–1992) and 42nd President of the United States (1993–2001)
- Tom Cotton, former U.S. representative for Arkansas's 4th congressional district (2013–2015), current U.S. Senator (since 2015)
- Joe Donnelly, former U.S. representative for Indiana's 2nd congressional district (2007–2013), U.S. Senator from Indiana (2013–2019)
- Dick Durbin, former U.S. representative for Illinois's 20th congressional district (1983–1997), current U.S. Senator from Illinois (since 1997)
- Angus King, former Governor of Maine (1995–2003), current U.S. Senator from Maine (since 2013)
- Sheffield Nelson, former chair of the Republican Party of Arkansas (1991–1992)
- David Pryor, former U.S. representative for Arkansas's 4th congressional district (1966–1973), Governor of Arkansas (1975–1979), and U.S. Senator (1979–1997)
- Mark Pryor, former Arkansas Attorney General (1999–2003), U.S. Senator (2003–2015)
- Tommy F. Robinson, former U.S. representative for Arkansas's 2nd congressional district (1985–1991)
- Leslie Rutledge, former Arkansas Attorney General (2015–2023), current Lieutenant Governor of Arkansas (since 2023)
