= Roland Site =

Archaeological site in Arkansas, United States

- Location within Arkansas
- 34°6′40.18″N 91°10′9.62″W
- Cultures: Marksville culture, Baytown culture, Plum Bayou culture, Mississippian culture
- Location: Gillett, Arkansas, Arkansas County, Arkansas, USA
- Region: Arkansas County, Arkansas

History
- Built: 1 CE

Site notes
- Architectural styles: platform mounds, plaza
- Excavation dates: 1965,

The Roland Site (3 AR 30) is an archaeological site located on Dry Lake, an extinct channel of the White River in Arkansas County, Arkansas. It was inhabited intermittently from the beginning of the common era to late prehistoric times, but its most intensive inhabitation was by peoples of the Plum Bayou culture (650 to 1050 CE), in a time known as the Late Woodland period.

== Description ==
The mound is a buildup of midden located on a terrace ridge to the northeast of the nearby Jacks Bay Site. Pottery sherds collected at the site have enabled archaeologists to determine the different succeeding cultures which have inhabited the site. The site was first occupied briefly about 1 CE by peoples of the Marksville culture. It was again occupied by the later peoples of the Baytown culture. This was the first intensive occupation of the site. Its largest and longest occupation was by peoples of the Plum Bayou/Coles Creek culture. It had one last light occupation during the prehistoric period by peoples of the Mississippian culture. The site was brought to the attention of archaeologists in 1965 when it was slated for use by the US Army Corps of Engineers as fill dirt for a nearby construction project. It was excavated in 1965 and 1966, and was listed on the National Register of Historic Places in 1975.

== See also ==
- Baytown Site
- Toltec Mounds
- National Register of Historic Places listings in Arkansas County, Arkansas
