= Hayes site =

Archaeological site in Arkansas

Hayes Site
- Location within Arkansas
- 34°26′32.96″N 91°36′33.12″W
- Cultures: Plum Bayou culture
- Location: Stuttgart, Arkansas, Arkansas County, Arkansas, USA
- Region: Arkansas County, Arkansas

Site notes
- Architectural styles: platform mounds, plaza

The Hayes site (3 AR 37) is an archaeological site located next to Bayou Meto in Arkansas County, Arkansas. It was inhabited by peoples of the Plum Bayou culture (650–1050 CE), in a time known as the Late Woodland period.

== Description ==
The site consisted of four platform mounds with a plaza. The site has not been excavated but ceramics typical of the Plum Bayou culture have been found at the site.

== See also ==
- Baytown Site
- Coy Site
- Toltec Mounds
