= National Register of Historic Places listings in Arkansas County, Arkansas =

Location of Arkansas County in Arkansas

This is a list of the National Register of Historic Places listings in Arkansas County, Arkansas.

This is intended to be a complete list of the properties and districts on the National Register of Historic Places in Arkansas County, Arkansas, United States. The locations of National Register properties and districts for which the latitude and longitude coordinates are included below, may be seen in a map.

There are 26 properties and districts listed on the National Register in the county, including 2 National Historic Landmarks.

Contents: Counties in Arkansas
- Arkansas
- Ashley
- Baxter
- Benton
- Boone
- Bradley
- Calhoun
- Carroll
- Chicot
- Clark
- Clay
- Cleburne
- Cleveland
- Columbia
- Conway
- Craighead
- Crawford
- Crittenden
- Cross
- Dallas
- Desha
- Drew
- Faulkner
- Franklin
- Fulton
- Garland
- Grant
- Greene
- Hempstead
- Hot Spring
- Howard
- Independence
- Izard
- Jackson
- Jefferson
- Johnson
- Lafayette
- Lawrence
- Lee
- Lincoln
- Little River
- Logan
- Lonoke
- Madison
- Marion
- Miller
- Mississippi
- Monroe
- Montgomery
- Nevada
- Newton
- Ouachita
- Perry
- Phillips
- Pike
- Poinsett
- Polk
- Pope
- Prairie
- Pulaski (Little Rock)
- Randolph
- St. Francis
- Saline
- Scott
- Searcy
- Sebastian
- Sevier
- Sharp
- Stone
- Union
- Van Buren
- Washington
- White
- Woodruff
- Yell

This National Park Service list is complete through NPS recent listings posted December 19, 2025.

== Current listings ==
	Name on the Register	Image	Date listed	Location	City or town	Description
1	A.M. Bohnert Rice Plantation Pump #2 Engine	A.M. Bohnert Rice Plantation Pump #2 Engine	September 23, 2010 (#10000783)	Southeast corner of U.S. Route 165 and Post Bayou Lane; 34°02′35″N 91°22′24″W	Gillett vicinity	
2	Arkansas County Courthouse-Northern District	Arkansas County Courthouse-Northern District	November 20, 1992 (#92001621)	Southwestern corner of the junction of E. 3rd and S. College Sts. 34°29′59″N 91°33′06″W	Stuttgart	
3	Arkansas County Courthouse-Southern District	Arkansas County Courthouse-Southern District	November 20, 1992 (#92001620)	Courthouse Sq. 34°17′42″N 91°20′06″W	De Witt	
4	Arkansas Post National Memorial	Arkansas Post National Memorial	October 15, 1966 (#66000198)	8 miles (13 km) southeast of Gillett on Highways 1 and 169; 34°01′15″N 91°20′54″W	Gillett	
5	L.A. Black Rice Milling Association Inc. Office	L.A. Black Rice Milling Association Inc. Office	January 29, 2013 (#12001229)	508 S. Monroe St. 34°17′26″N 91°20′27″W	DeWitt	
6	Paul and Ella Buerkle House		January 4, 2022 (#100007320)	109 East 11th St. 34°29′35″N 91°33′07″W	Stuttgart	
7	Crocketts Bluff Hunting Lodge	Crocketts Bluff Hunting Lodge	August 1, 2008 (#08000723)	End of a dirt road north of the point at which Highway 153 turns south 34°26′51″N 91°13′15″W	Crocketts Bluff	
8	DeWitt Commercial Historic District	DeWitt Commercial Historic District	April 27, 2010 (#10000213)	Roughly bounded by N. Washington, 2nd St., S. Adams and Gibson Ave. 34°17′41″N 91°20′06″W	De Witt	
9	DeWitt Post Office	DeWitt Post Office	August 14, 1998 (#98000915)	221 W. Cross St. 34°17′42″N 91°20′14″W	De Witt	
10	First United Methodist Church	First United Methodist Church	September 4, 1992 (#92001158)	Junction of Jefferson and Cross Sts. 34°17′42″N 91°20′16″W	De Witt	
11	Halliburton House	Halliburton House	November 5, 1974 (#74000464)	300 W. Halliburton St. 34°17′55″N 91°20′15″W	De Witt	
12	Immanuel High School-AR0280	Immanuel High School-AR0280	January 24, 2007 (#06001282)	68 Immanuel Rd. 34°24′06″N 91°19′19″W	Almyra	
13	Maxwell Street Bridge	Maxwell Street Bridge	April 8, 2011 (#10001148)	Maxwell St., east of Jefferson St. 34°17′51″N 91°20′15″W	De Witt	
14	Menard-Hodges Mounds (3AR4)	Menard-Hodges Mounds (3AR4)	October 31, 1985 (#85003542)	Southern corner of the irregular Section 2303, Township 8 South, Range 2 West; 33°58′57″N 91°15′45″W	Nady	Now owned by the National Park Service and administered as part of the Arkansas Post National Memorial.
15	North Jackson Street Bridge	North Jackson Street Bridge	April 8, 2011 (#10001151)	North Jackson St., over Holt Branch; 34°17′51″N 91°20′29″W	De Witt	
16	North Washington Street Bridge	North Washington Street Bridge	January 22, 2014 (#13001102)	N. Washington St. over Holt Branch; 34°18′02″N 91°20′00″W	De Witt	
17	Old Arkansas 11, Kauffman Road Segment	Old Arkansas 11, Kauffman Road Segment	September 20, 2006 (#06000834)	Kauffman Rd. 34°22′59″N 91°32′26″W	Stuttgart	
18	Old Gillett Jail	Old Gillett Jail	May 22, 2007 (#07000440)	207 Main St. 34°07′09″N 91°22′45″W	Gillett	
19	Riceland Hotel	Riceland Hotel	May 21, 1986 (#86001105)	3rd and Main Sts. 34°30′00″N 91°33′10″W	Stuttgart	
20	Roland Site		May 2, 1975 (#75000372)	Address Restricted	Tichnor	
21	St. Charles Battle Monument	St. Charles Battle Monument	May 3, 1996 (#96000505)	Junction of Arkansas St. and Broadway; 34°22′26″N 91°08′08″W	St. Charles	
22	St. Charles Battle Site	St. Charles Battle Site	December 2, 1974 (#74000465)	Junction of Highway 1 and the White River; 34°22′41″N 91°07′34″W	St. Charles	Site of the Civil War Battle of Saint Charles.
23	Standard Ice Company Building	Standard Ice Company Building	July 2, 1979 (#79003433)	517 S. Main St. 34°29′52″N 91°33′08″W	Stuttgart	
24	Stuttgart Commercial Historic District	Stuttgart Commercial Historic District	June 4, 2007 (#07000502)	Roughly bounded by 1st St., College St., 6th St., and Maple St. 34°29′52″N 91°33′08″W	Stuttgart	
25	Tichnor Rice Dryer and Storage Building	Tichnor Rice Dryer and Storage Building	September 22, 2006 (#06000911)	1030 Highway 44; 34°08′10″N 91°15′56″W	Tichnor	
26	US Post Office-Stuttgart	US Post Office-Stuttgart	January 14, 2004 (#03001380)	302 S. Maple; 34°29′59″N 91°33′14″W	Stuttgart	

== See also ==
- List of National Historic Landmarks in Arkansas
- National Register of Historic Places listings in Arkansas
