= Coy Site =

Archaeological site in Arkansas, United States

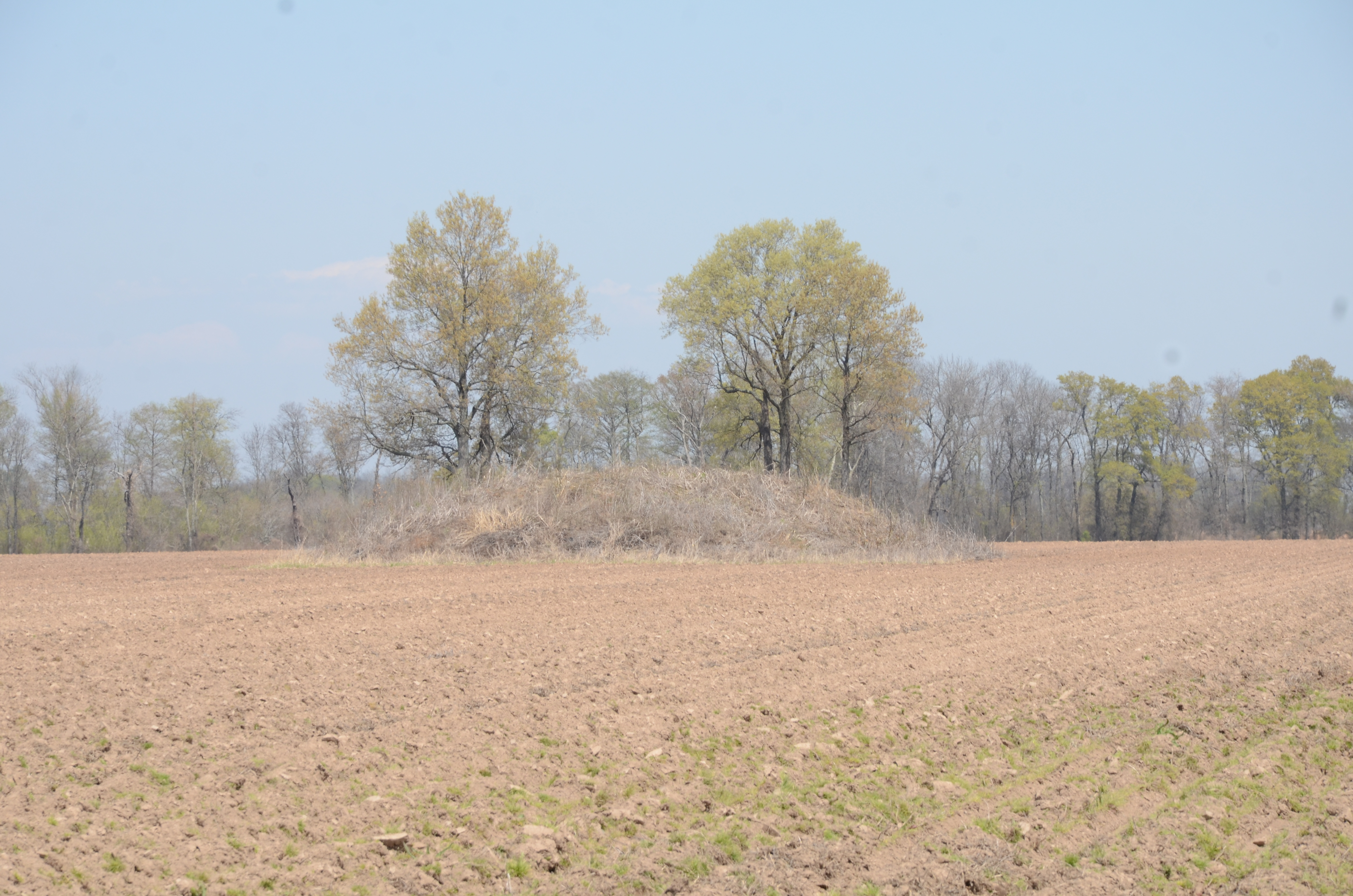

- Location within Arkansas
- 34°32′56.22″N 91°53′23.64″W
- Cultures: Plum Bayou culture
- Location: England, Arkansas, Lonoke County, Arkansas, USA
- Region: Lonoke County, Arkansas

History
- Built: 730 CE
- Abandoned: 1010 CE

Site notes
- Architectural styles: platform mounds, burial mound
- Excavation dates: 1883, 1988, 1994
- Archaeologists: Edward Palmer

The Coy Site (3 LN 20) is an archaeological site located next to Indian-Bakers Bayou in Lonoke County, Arkansas. It was inhabited by peoples of the Plum Bayou culture (650—1050 CE), in a time known as the Late Woodland period. The site was occupied between 700 and 1000 CE. It was listed on the National Register of Historic Places in 1995.

== Description ==
The site once consisted of four mounds, several flat-topped platform mounds and at least one burial mounds and extensive midden areas. The site was excavated by Edward Palmer in 1883. He described the largest two platform mounds as being 4 metres (13 ft) in height and 3 metres (9.8 ft). He also noted a 2.4 metres (7.9 ft) burial mound and a low mound of undetermined function. Only the largest platform mound survives to the present day. This mound was tested in 1988 and 1994, and returned dates between 730 and 1010 CE.

== See also ==
- Baytown Site
- Hayes site
- Toltec Mounds
- National Register of Historic Places listings in Lonoke County, Arkansas
