= Humphrey, Arkansas =

- City
- Location of Humphrey in Arkansas County and Jefferson County, Arkansas.
- Coordinates: 34°25′21″N 91°42′09″W
- Country: United States
- State: Arkansas
- County: Arkansas, Jefferson

Area
  - Total: 1.31 sq mi (3.38 km^{2})
  - Land: 1.31 sq mi (3.38 km^{2})
  - Water: 0 sq mi (0.00 km^{2})
- Elevation: 190 ft (58 m)

Population (2020)
  - Total: 463
  - Estimate (2025): 430 ▼
  - Density: 354.5/sq mi (136.88/km^{2})
- Time zone: UTC-6 (Central (CST))
  - Summer (DST): UTC-5 (CDT)
- ZIP code: 72073
- Area code: 870
- FIPS code: 05-33850
- GNIS feature ID: 2404743
- Airport: LIT

Humphrey is a city in Arkansas and Jefferson counties in the U.S. state of Arkansas. As of the 2020 census, Humphrey had a population of 463. It is included in the Pine Bluff micropolitan Statistical Area.

== Geography ==
According to the United States Census Bureau, the city has a total area of 1.4 square miles (3.6 km^{2}), all land.

== Demographics ==
Historical population
Census	Pop.	Note	%±
1910	380		—
1920	554		45.8%
1930	595		7.4%
1940	595		0.0%
1950	629		5.7%
1960	649		3.2%
1970	818		26.0%
1980	872		6.6%
1990	743		−14.8%
2000	806		8.5%
2010	557		−30.9%
2020	463		−16.9%
2025 (est.)	430	▼	−7.1%
U.S. Decennial Census

=== Racial and ethnic composition ===
Humphrey city, Arkansas – Racial and ethnic composition Note: the US Census treats Hispanic/Latino as an ethnic category. This table excludes Latinos from the racial categories and assigns them to a separate category. Hispanics/Latinos may be of any race.
Race / Ethnicity (NH = Non-Hispanic)	Pop 2000	Pop 2010	Pop 2020	% 2000	% 2010	% 2020
White alone (NH)	463	344	242	57.44%	61.76%	52.27%
Black or African American alone (NH)	323	200	188	40.07%	35.91%	40.60%
Native American or Alaska Native alone (NH)	1	3	2	0.12%	0.54%	0.43%
Asian alone (NH)	0	0	0	0.00%	0.00%	0.00%
Native Hawaiian or Pacific Islander alone (NH)	0	0	0	0.00%	0.00%	0.00%
Other race alone (NH)	0	1	0	0.00%	0.18%	0.00%
Mixed race or Multiracial (NH)	12	2	10	1.49%	0.36%	2.16%
Hispanic or Latino (any race)	7	7	21	0.87%	1.26%	4.54%
Total	806	557	463	100.00%	100.00%	100.00%

=== 2000 census ===
As of the census of 2000, there were 806 people, 319 households, and 209 families residing in the city. The population density was 592.3 inhabitants per square mile (228.7/km^{2}). There were 365 housing units at an average density of 268.2 per square mile (103.6/km^{2}). The racial makeup of the city was 57.82% White, 40.45% Black or African American, 1.20% Native American, 1.00% from other races, and 1.49% from two or more races. 0.87% of the population were Hispanic or Latino of any race.

There were 319 households, out of which 34.8% had children under the age of 18 living with them, 46.1% were married couples living together, 16.0% had a female householder with no husband present, and 34.2% were non-families. 31.7% of all households were made up of individuals, and 13.5% had someone living alone who was 65 years of age or older. The average household size was 2.53 and the average family size was 3.20.

In the city, the population was spread out, with 30.5% under the age of 18, 7.7% from 18 to 24, 26.1% from 25 to 44, 22.2% from 45 to 64, and 13.5% who were 65 years of age or older. The median age was 36 years. For every 100 females, there were 84.9 males. For every 100 females age 18 and over, there were 81.2 males.

The median income for a household in the city was $25,880, and the median income for a family was $33,824. Males had a median income of $25,163 versus $23,472 for females. The per capita income for the city was $12,517. About 23.7% of families and 22.9% of the population were below the poverty line, including 27.9% of those under age 18 and 21.4% of those age 65 or over.

== Education ==
Humphrey is in the DeWitt School District, which operates DeWitt High School. On July 1, 2004, the Humphrey School District, along with the Gillett School District, consolidated into the DeWitt district. The DeWitt district voted to close Humphrey Elementary School in 2009.
