= A.M. Bohnert Rice Plantation Pump =

- A.M. Bohnert Rice Plantation Pump #2 Engine
- U.S. National Register of Historic Places
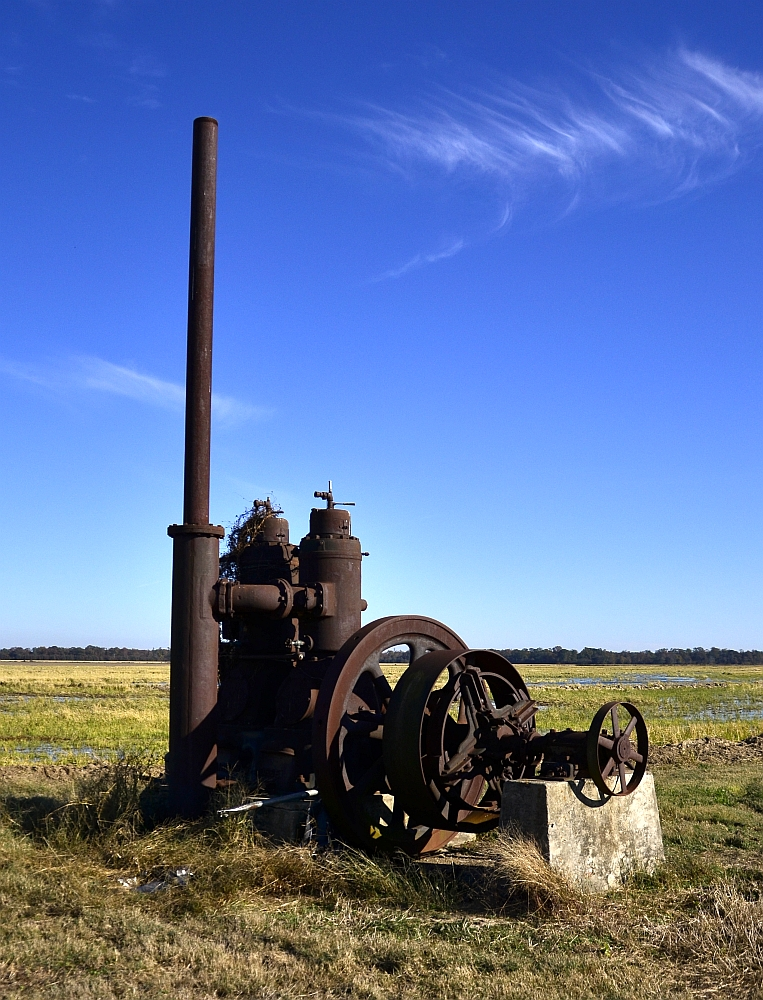

- Location within Arkansas Location within the United States
- Location: Route 165 and Post Bayou Lane, in Arkansas County, Arkansas
- Coordinates: 34°2′35″N 91°22′24″W
- Built: 1945
- Architect: Fairbanks, Morse & Company
- NRHP reference No.: 10000783
- Added to NRHP: September 23, 2010

The A.M. Bohnert Rice Plantation Pump, located on Route 165 and Post Bayou Lane, near Gillett, Arkansas, in Arkansas County, is a rare surviving example of an early 20th-century pump engine built by the engine manufacturer Fairbanks, Morse & Company. The pumping engine played an important role in productive rice farming in the area, supplying water to flood the fields.

The National Register of Historic Places included the pump in 2010.

== See also ==
- L.A. Black Rice Milling Association Inc. Office, also in Arkansas County, Arkansas
- Tichnor Rice Dryer and Storage Building, also in Arkansas County, Arkansas
- National Register of Historic Places listings in Arkansas County, Arkansas
