= Baytown =

Baytown may refer to:

- Baytown, Texas, a city in the United States near Houston, Texas
- Baytown culture, an archaeological culture in the United States
- Operation Baytown, British invasion of Italy in 1943 during World War II
