= Gillett School District =

Gillett School District may refer to:

- Gillett School District (Wisconsin)
- Gillett School District (Arkansas) (defunct)
