= Tichnor, Arkansas =

Unincorporated community in Arkansas, US

Coordinates: 34°08′25″N 91°16′14″W

Tichnor is an unincorporated community in Arkansas County, Arkansas, United States. It is the location of the Tichnor Rice Dryer and Storage Building, and is the nearest community to the Roland Site (address restricted), both listed on the National Register of Historic Places. The ZIP Code for Tichnor is 72166.

The U.S. Army Corps of Engineers operates the nearby Lock #2 on the Arkansas Post Canal connecting the White River and Arkansas River. The dam controls the water level in Merrisach Lake.

Lloyd L. Burke, awarded a Medal of Honor for this actions in the Korean War, was born in Tichnor.

== Education ==
Residents are in the DeWitt School District. It operates DeWitt High School.
