= Gillett High School =

Gillett High School may refer to:

- Gillett High School (Arkansas), Gillet, Arkansas
- Gillett High School (Wisconsin), in Gillett, Wisconsin
