= Riceland Hotel =

- U.S. National Register of Historic Places
- U.S. Historic district – Contributing property
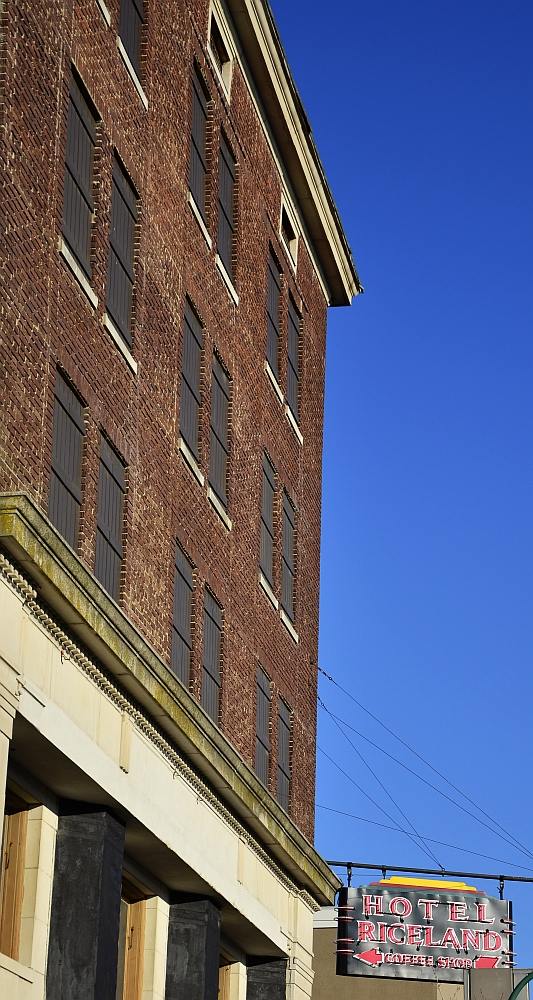
- Hotel Riceland in 2012

- Location within Arkansas Location within the United States
- Location: Third and Main Sts., Stuttgart, Arkansas
- Coordinates: 34°30′1″N 91°33′8″W
- Area: less than one acre
- Built: 1919
- Architect: Mann & Stern; Et al.
- Architectural style: Classical Revival
- Part of: Stuttgart Commercial Historic District (ID07000502)
- NRHP reference No.: 86001105

Significant dates
- Added to NRHP: May 21, 1986
- Designated CP: June 4, 2007

The Hotel Riceland is a former hotel in downtown Stuttgart, Arkansas. It is listed on the National Register of Historic Places, and is located on the southwest corner of 3rd Street and South Main Street.

Construction began in 1919, with the grand opening in 1923. The hotel closed in 1970. The luxurious five-story hotel was designed by George R. Mann complete with rooftop garden. It is the largest commercial building in Stuttgart.

Duckhunters would flock to the hotel in winter for the annual shoot. Notable guests of the hotel included Ernest Hemingway and Clark Gable.
