= William Traher =

American painter

William Henry Traher
- Born: 1908; Rock Springs, Wyoming, U.S.
- Died: 1984 (aged 75–76); Denver, Colorado, U.S.
- Occupation: Painter

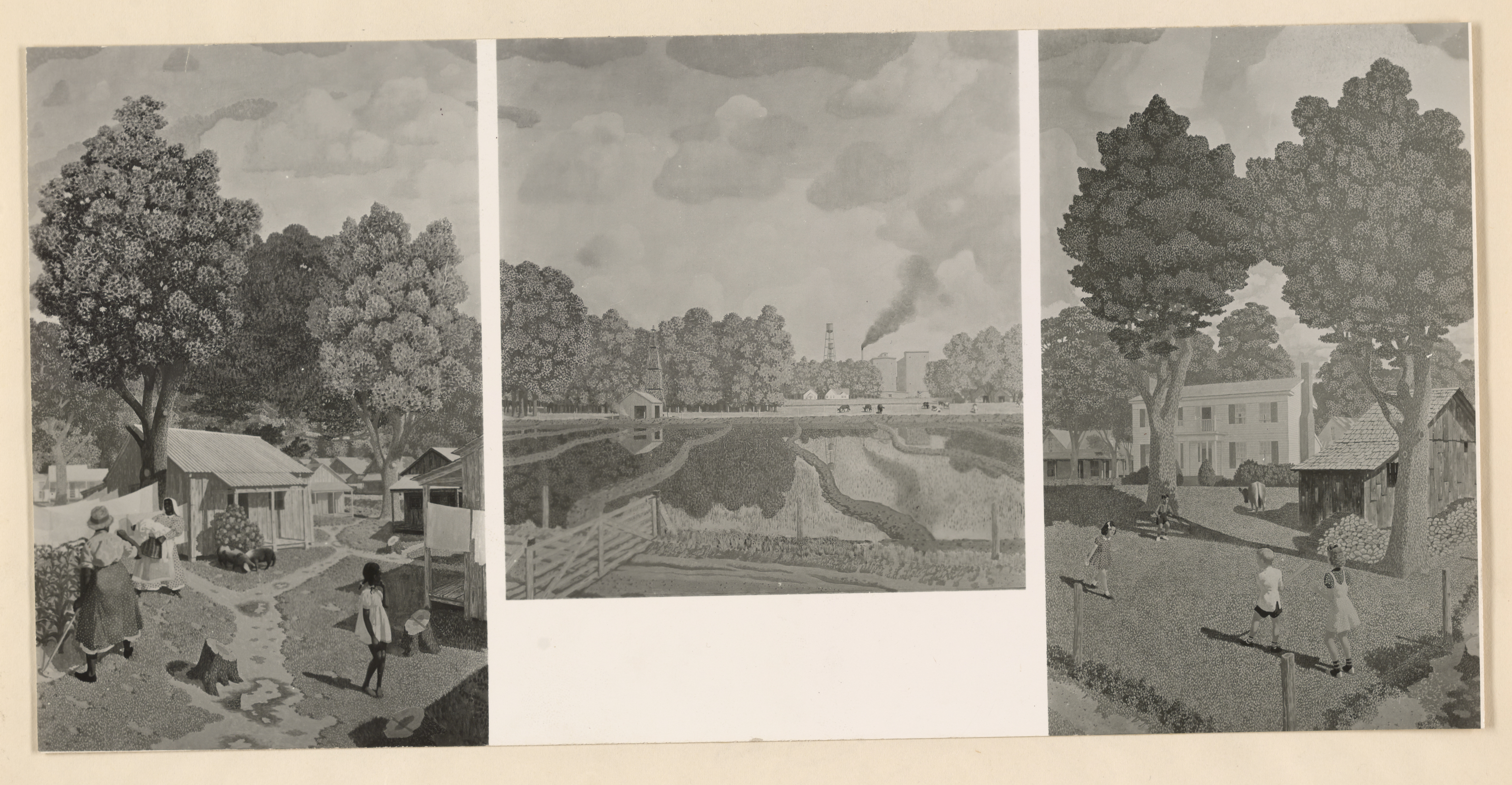
Portrait of Contemporary DeWitt (1941), U.S. post office mural for DeWitt, Arkansas, commissioned by the Section of Painting and Sculpture

William Traher (1908-1984) was an American painter and muralist. He painted a mural in the DeWitt Post Office in DeWitt, Arkansas. His work was exhibited at the Museum of Modern Art in 1936.
