= Immanuel High School (Almyra, Arkansas) =

- Immanuel High School-AR0280
- U.S. National Register of Historic Places
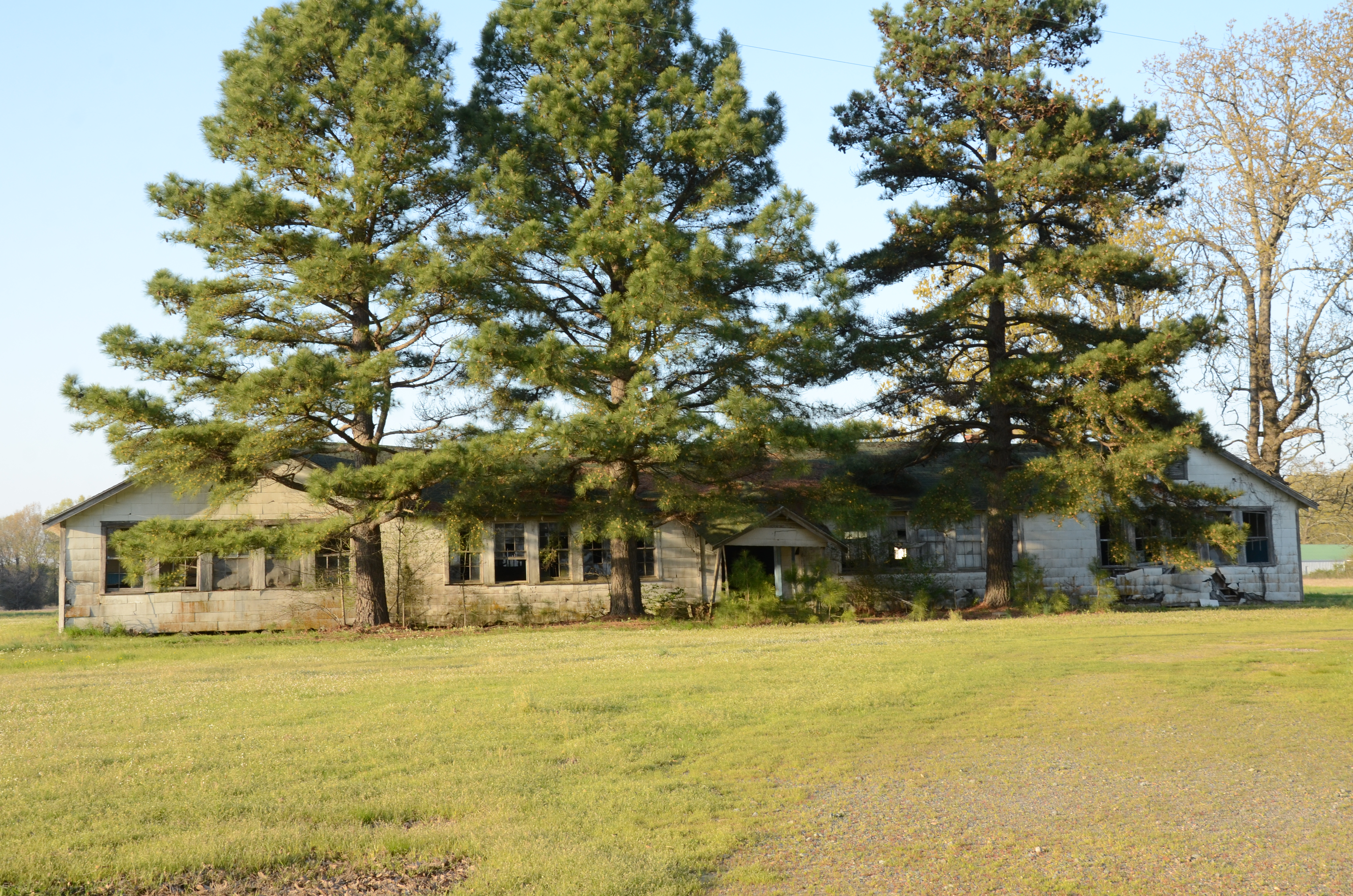

- Location within Arkansas Location within the United States
- Location: 68 Immanuel Rd., Almyra, Arkansas
- Coordinates: 34°24′6″N 91°19′19″W
- Area: less than one acre
- Built: 1940
- Architect: S.E. Ryan
- Architectural style: Bungalow/craftsman
- NRHP reference No.: 06001282
- Added to NRHP: January 24, 2007

The Immanuel High School is a historic school building in rural Arkansas County, Arkansas, USA. It is located at 68 Immanuel Road, about 0.5 miles (0.80 km) east of Arkansas Highway 33, east of Almyra. It is a single-story wood-frame structure in a U shape, covered in siding, with a cross-gable roof. Built c. 1940, it is the only surviving element of the Immanuel Industrial Institute, a larger complex of buildings built to educate the local African-American population. The complex was merged into a regional school district in 1950, and was closed in 1966. It was used for a variety of other private and non-profit educational purposes afterward, but has been vacant since the mid-1990s.

The building was listed on the National Register of Historic Places in 2007.

== See also ==
- National Register of Historic Places listings in Arkansas County, Arkansas
