= Plum Bayou culture =

Archaeological culture in North America

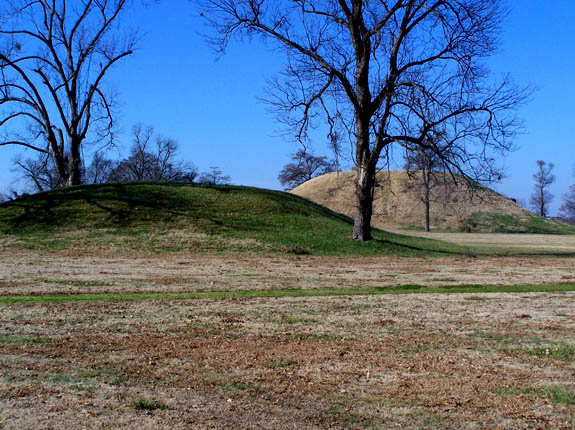
Toltec Mounds, the largest known Plum Bayou site

Plum Bayou culture is a Pre-Columbian Native American culture that lived in what is now east-central Arkansas from 650–1050 CE, a time known as the Late Woodland Period. Archaeologists defined the culture based on the Plum Bayou Mounds site, previously known as Toltec Mounds, and named it for a local waterway.

== Relationship to other cultures ==
The Baytown culture (300 to 650 CE) preceded the Plum Bayou culture, and was then followed by early Mississippian cultures, which flourished from 900—1600 CE, until diseases brought by Europeans decimated their populations.

The Plum Bayou culture had contact with the Coles Creek culture, located along the Mississippi River, and early Caddoan cultures, located in river valleys of the Red, Ouachita, and Arkansas Rivers in Arkansas and into Oklahoma.

Exotic materials found at Plum Bayou sites reveal trade with the Ozark Plateau, West Gulf Coastal Plain, and the Ouachita Mountains.

Major Plum Bayou sites with single or multiple mounds include:

- Baytown Site
- Chandler Landing Site, Prairie County
- Coy Site
- Dogtown Site
- Hayes Site
- Maberry Site, Woodruff County
- Roland Site
- Toltec Mounds

== Settlements ==
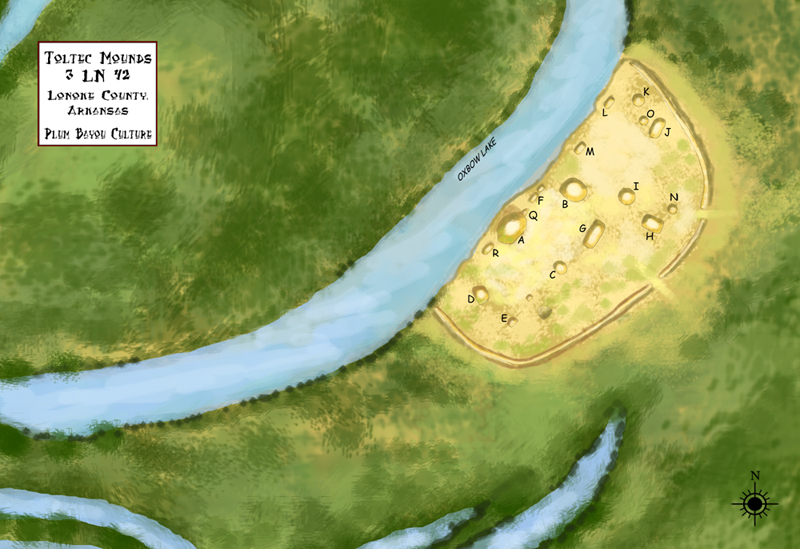
Toltec Mounds Site

Plum Bayou culture was one of the earliest groups to build ceremonial community centers with platform mounds and rectangular plazas. They primarily lived in small villages in the uplands and floodplains of the White and Arkansas Rivers. Archaeologists divide Plum Bayou settlements into "single household, multiple household, multiple household with mound, and multiple mound sites."

== Subsistence ==
Farmers grew crops such as amaranth, chenopodium, bottle gourd, knotweed, little barley, maygrass, squash, sunflower, and sumpweed. In some later Plum Bayou sites, maize was cultivated in small amounts. Supplementing their farming, Plum Bayou peoples also hunted game and gathered wild plants, such as cherries, grapes, plums, persimmons, and nuts.

== Material culture ==
This culture is defined in part by its ceramics. Much of Plum Bayou ceramics was plainware, tempered with shells. Named types of ceramics found at Plum Bayou sites include Coles Creek incised var. Keyo, Larto Red, Officer Punctated, and French Fork incised. Red slip, or clay paint, was also used to decorate some ceramic vessels.

== Decline ==
While neighboring cultures adopted maize cultivation and increasingly complex religions and political organization, the Plum Bayou people did not. People continued to occupy the region, but they abandoned their ceremonial sites. The exact descendants of the Plum Bayou culture are not known; however, Quapaw people today are responsible for Plum Bayou human remains and artifacts through the Native American Graves Protection and Repatriation Act.

== See also ==
- Culture, phase, and chronological table for the Mississippi Valley
