= First United Methodist Church (DeWitt, Arkansas) =

Historic church in Arkansas, United States

- U.S. National Register of Historic Places
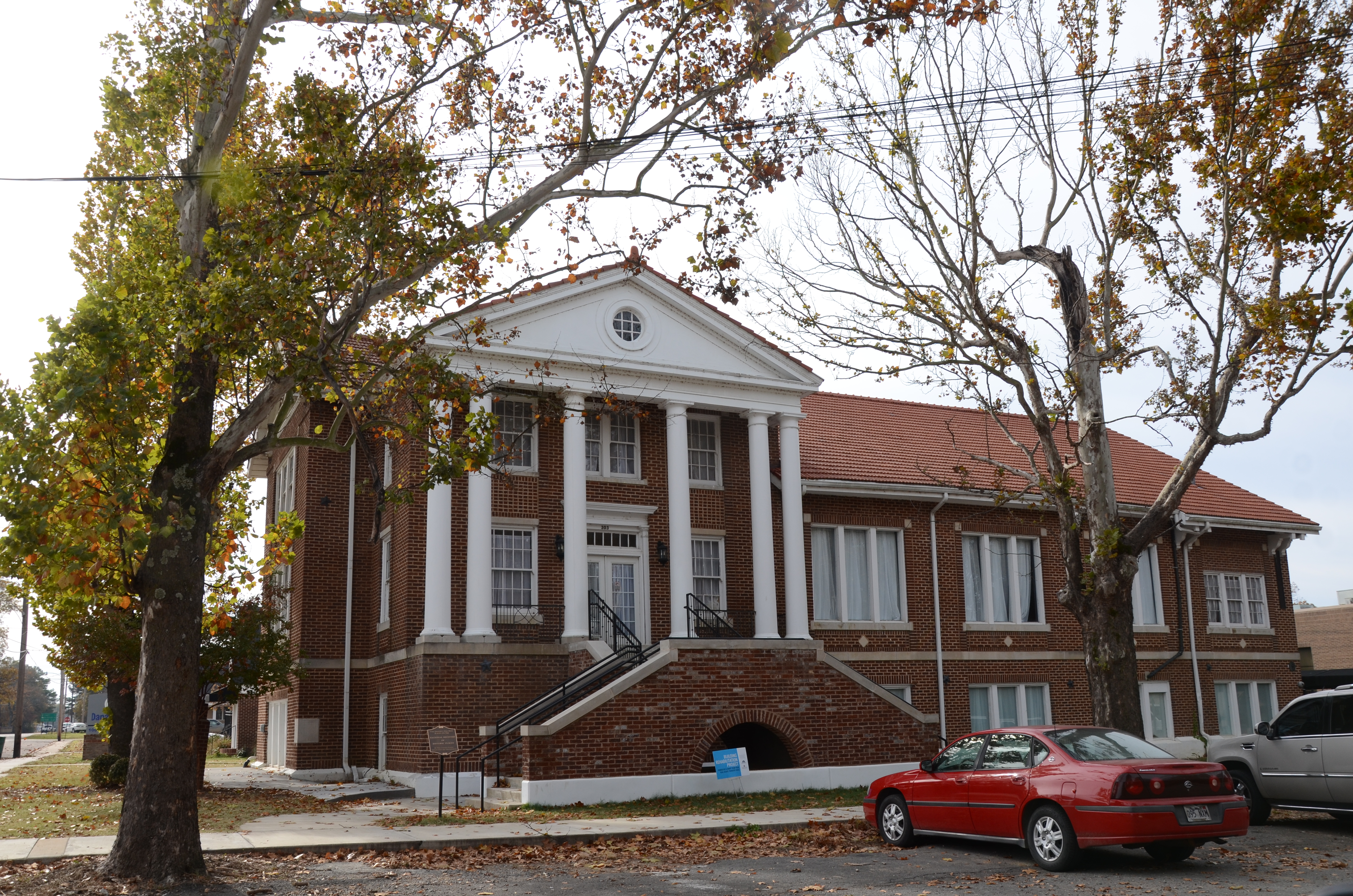

- Location within Arkansas Location within the United States
- Location: Jct. of Jefferson and Cross Sts., DeWitt, Arkansas
- Coordinates: 34°17′42″N 91°20′16″W
- Area: less than one acre
- Built: 1923
- Architect: Thompson & Harding
- Architectural style: Classical Revival
- MPS: Thompson, Charles L., Design Collection TR
- NRHP reference No.: 92001158
- Added to NRHP: September 4, 1992

The First United Methodist Church is a historic church building at Jefferson and Cross Streets in DeWitt, Arkansas. It is a two-story red brick structure, designed Thompson & Harding and built in 1923. It has a Classical Revival style portico supported by six unevenly spaced Tuscan columns. The triangular pediment is fully enclosed, with a central oculus window. The building is the third built for a congregation established in 1854–55, and the first built of brick.

The building was listed on the National Register of Historic Places in 1992.

== See also ==
- National Register of Historic Places listings in Arkansas County, Arkansas
