= L.A. Black Rice Milling Association Inc. Office =

- U.S. National Register of Historic Places
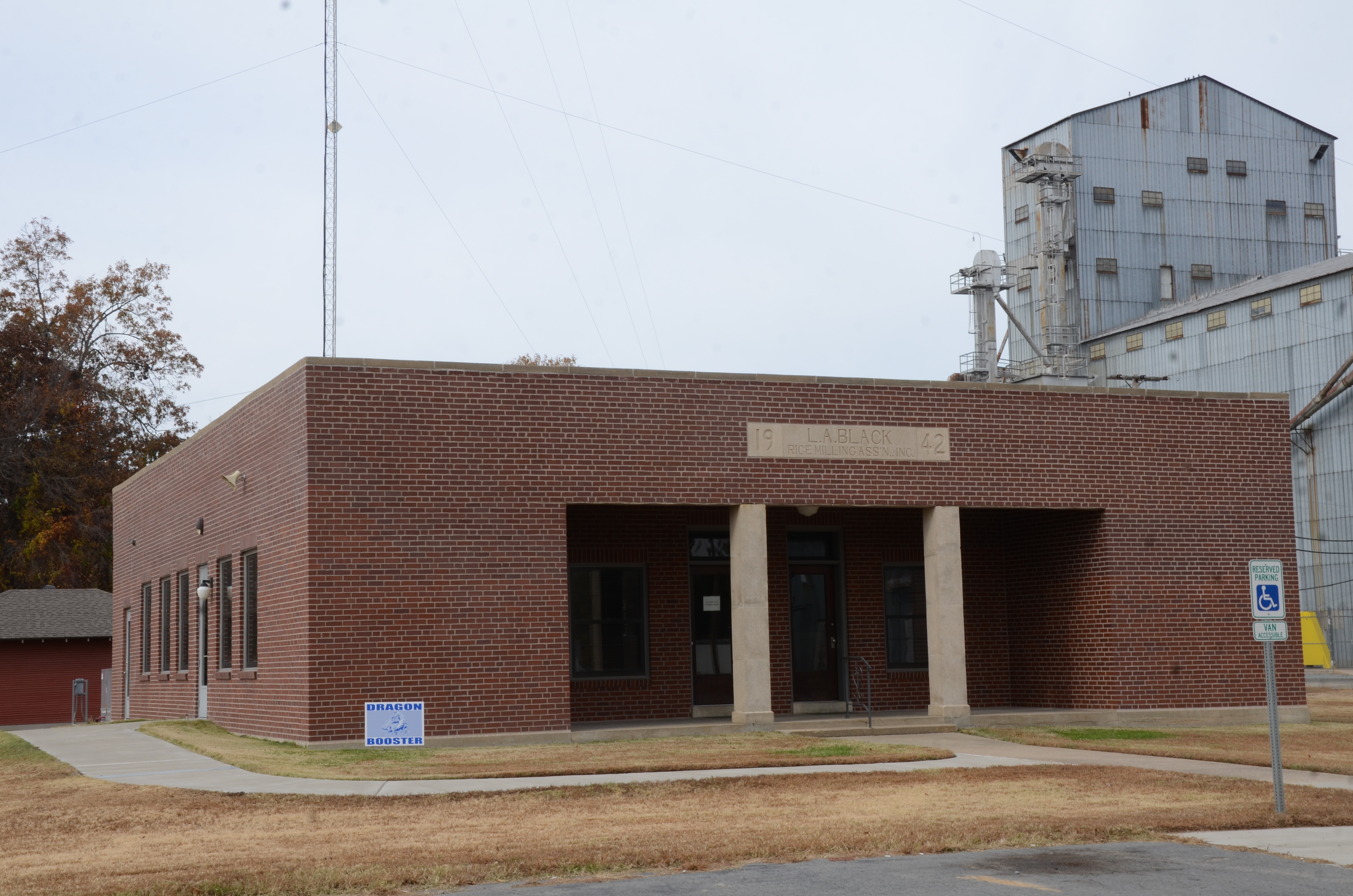

- Location within Arkansas Location within the United States
- Location: 508 S. Monroe St., DeWitt, Arkansas
- Coordinates: 34°17′26″N 91°20′27″W
- Area: less than one acre
- Built: 1942
- NRHP reference No.: 12001229
- Added to NRHP: January 29, 2013

The L.A. Black Rice Milling Association Inc. Office is a historic office building at 508 South Monroe Street in DeWitt, Arkansas. It is a single-story brick structure with a low-pitch shed roof. Built in 1942, the building has minimal styling, with a recessed porch on its eastern facade sheltering the entries to two storefronts. It is notable as the only surviving element associated with the business activities of Lester Asher Black (1880-1945), a leading businessman in DeWitt. Black was the president of the First National Bank of DeWitt from its founding in 1912 until his death, and operated a rice mill (no longer standing) as well as a hardware and agricultural supply store catering to rice farmers. He also owned thousands of acres of land planted in rice, at a time when Arkansas was the largest national supplier of the crop.

The building was listed on the National Register of Historic Places in 2013.

== See also ==
- A.M. Bohnert Rice Plantation Pump also in Arkansas County, Arkansas
- Tichnor Rice Dryer and Storage Building, also in Arkansas County, Arkansas
- National Register of Historic Places listings in Arkansas County, Arkansas
