= Lloyd L. Burke =

US Army Medal of Honor recipient (1924–1999)

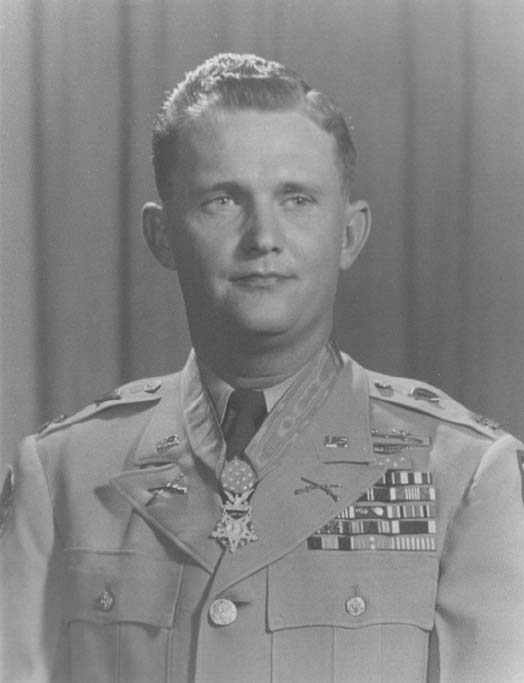
- Born: September 29, 1924; Tichnor, Arkansas, U.S.
- Died: June 1, 1999 (aged 74); Hot Springs, Arkansas, U.S.
- Burial place: Arlington National Cemetery
- Military career
- Allegiance: United States
- Branch: United States Army
- Service years: 1943–1946; 1950–1978
- Rank: Colonel
- Nickname: Scooter
- Units: 2nd Battalion, 5th Cavalry Regiment, 1st Cavalry Division
- Conflicts: World War II; Korean War; Vietnam War
- Awards: Medal of Honor; Distinguished Service Cross; Army Distinguished Service Medal; Bronze Star Medal (2); Purple Heart (4)

Lloyd Leslie Burke (September 29, 1924 – June 1, 1999) was a soldier in the United States Army who received the Medal of Honor for his actions on October 28, 1951 during the Korean War.

== Military career ==
In 1943, Burke was eighteen years old when he dropped out of Henderson State College (now Henderson State University) in Arkansas. He joined the United States Army and served two years during World War II with combat engineers in Italy. After being discharged, he joined the Reserve Officers' Training Corps (ROTC) when he returned to Henderson State College, where the ROTC program today is nicknamed "Burke's Raiders." There he became a member of Phi Sigma Epsilon fraternity. In 1950, he graduated as a Distinguished Military Graduate.

After accepting his commission, Burke was dispatched to South Korea five months later. At the time, he was the leader of Company G, 2nd Battalion, 5th Cavalry Regiment. When Chinese People's Volunteer Army (PVA) forces crossed the Yalu River, Burke managed to lead his platoon to safety. As a result of his actions he was awarded the Silver Star, which was later upgraded to the Distinguished Service Cross, and two Purple Hearts.

=== Hill 200 ===
Burke's tour of duty was almost over in October 1951. At the time, Burke was found at the rear of his regiment. He had a plane ticket in his pocket and was eager to see his wife and infant son. 2 miles (3.2 km) away, Burke's company was attempting to cross the Yokkok-chon River in Cheorwon County. The company was hindered by a large and well-entrenched PVA force on Hill 200. The battle raged for days, with the 2nd Battalion's attacks being constantly repulsed. At first, Lieutenant Burke kept up with the reports. Eventually, he could no longer remain on the sidelines. As he himself stated, "I couldn't see leaving my guys up there without trying to do something."

When Burke was at the base of Hill 200, he was shocked to witness his company's strength reduced to 35 traumatized survivors. Burke described the condition of his company:

These men were completely beat. They lay huddled in foxholes, unable to move. They all had the thousand-yard stare of men who'd seen too much fighting, too much death.

Burke dragged up a 57 mm recoilless rifle and shot three rounds at the closest enemy bunker. The bunker itself was a wooden-fronted structure covering a cave, which was dug into the overall hillside. The PVA attacked American troops by hurling grenades from their trenches. Burke aimed his M1 rifle at the trench line and shot at every PVA soldier who rose to throw a grenade. Unfortunately, the grenades were still being thrown. After firing an eight-round clip, Burke decided to take more drastic measures. As he recalled, "I considered myself a pretty fair shot, but this was getting ridiculous. I had to do something."

After laying down his rifle, Burke took a grenade and ran approximately 30 yards (27 m) to the PVA trench line. He avoided enemy fire by hurling himself at the base of a dirt berm that was 2 feet (0.61 m) high. When the Chinese momentarily stopped firing, Burke jumped into one of the trenches with a pistol in one hand and a grenade in the other. He shot five or six PVA soldiers in the forehead. Burke also fired at two PVA soldiers from further down the trench. Afterwards, he threw his grenade in their direction, jumped out of the trench, and placed himself against the dirt berm. The PVA were aware of Burke's location and began throwing grenades at his position. Most of the grenades thrown rolled down the hill and harmlessly exploded. Some of the grenades, however, did explode near Burke. He managed to catch three of them and toss them back at the Chinese. At the same time, troops from Burke's company threw grenades. However, some of those grenades exploded near Burke.

Burke abandoned the dirt berm by crawling off to the side, where he found cover in a gully. The gully itself ended further up Hill 200 at a Korean burial mound. After edging his way up the hill, Burke peeked over the top of the burial mound. He saw the main PVA trench, which was approximately 100 yards (100 m) away. The trench was covered in enfilade, was curved around the hill and contained many PVA troops. Surprisingly, the Chinese were relaxing, with some of them talking, sitting, and laughing, while others were throwing grenades and firing mortars. Burke went down the gully to Company G's position and told Sergeant Arthur Foster, the senior NCO, "Get'em ready to attack when I give you the signal!" Burke then dragged the last functioning M1919 Browning machine gun and three cans of ammunition back up the hill. On top of the burial mound, he mounted the machine gun, set the screw to free traverse, and prepared his 250-round ammunition box. He began firing at the nearest part of the PVA trench where the mortars were located. After Burke shot at all of the Chinese mortar squads, he then fired upon a machine gun emplacement. Afterwards, Burke fired up and down the trench at PVA soldiers too shocked to react. Eventually, the Chinese fled down the trench in a panic. Burke continued to fire until his Browning jammed. While he attempted to clear his weapon, an enemy soldier started throwing grenades at him. Burke ignored this, as well as grenade fragments that tore open the back of his hand. Eventually, Burke was able to clear his weapon and kill the Chinese grenadier.

Meanwhile, Sergeant Foster led a small group to Burke's location and was told by Burke to provide extra firepower. Burke and the others were convinced that they were under siege from a full-sized force instead of a few determined skirmishers. As the PVA retreated, Burke wrapped his field jacket around the Browning's hot barrel sleeve and tore the 31-pound weapon off its tripod. He then wrapped the ammunition belt around his body, walked towards the trench, and fired upon retreating units. Foster and his men followed. When Burke ran out of Browning ammunition, he used his .45 automatic and grenades in order to clear out bunkers. At Hill 200, Burke killed over 100 men and destroyed two mortar emplacements and three machine gun nests. For his actions, he was awarded the Medal of Honor at a White House ceremony on April 11, 1952.

=== Vietnam and later ===
Burke was the commanding officer of the 2nd Battalion, 16th Infantry Regiment, 1st Infantry Division, at Bien Hoa in 1965. On 22 July, while commanding combat operations from a helicopter, Burke was shot down by small arms fire. He had to return to the United States and was hospitalized for an extended period of time. Once out of the hospital, he was assigned to West Germany. Overall, he spent 35 years in the US Armed Forces, served as the army's liaison officer to the United States Congress, and retired with the rank of full colonel in 1978.

Burke is buried in Arlington National Cemetery in Arlington, Virginia.

== Awards and decorations ==
Colonel Burke's awards include:

American awards and decorations Personal awards Medal of Honor Distinguished Service Cross Army Distinguished Service Medal Silver Star (Upgraded to Distinguished Service Cross) Bronze Star with "V" device & oak leaf cluster Purple Heart with 3 oak leaf clusters Joint Service Commendation Medal Army Commendation Medal with 3 oak leaf clusters	American awards and decorations Unit awards Presidential Unit Citation Service awards Good Conduct Medal Campaign and service awards American Campaign Medal European–African–Middle Eastern Campaign Medal with 3 service stars World War II Victory Medal Army of Occupation Medal National Defense Service Medal with 1 service star Korean Service Medal with 5 service stars Vietnam Service Medal with 1 service star

American awards and decorations Badges and tabs Combat Infantryman Badge (2nd Award)

International awards and decorations Individual and unit awards Republic of Korea Presidential Unit Citation Vietnam Gallantry Cross United Nations Korea Medal Vietnam Campaign Medal Korean War Service Medal Badges

== Medal of Honor citation ==
Rank and organization: First Lieutenant, U.S. Army

Company G, 5th Cavalry Regiment, 1st Cavalry Division

Place and date: Near Chong-dong, Korea, October 28, 1951

Entered service at: Stuttgart, Arkansas Born: September 29, 1924, Tichnor, Arkansas

G.O. No.: 43.

Citation:

1st Lt. Burke, distinguished himself by conspicuous gallantry and outstanding courage above and beyond the call of duty in action against the enemy. Intense enemy fire had pinned down leading elements of his company committed to secure commanding ground when 1st Lt. Burke left the command post to rally and urge the men to follow him toward 3 bunkers impeding the advance. Dashing to an exposed vantage point he threw several grenades at the bunkers, then, returning for an Ml rifle and adapter, he made a lone assault, wiping out the position and killing the crew. Closing on the center bunker he lobbed grenades through the opening and, with his pistol, killed 3 of its occupants attempting to surround him. Ordering his men forward he charged the third emplacement, catching several grenades in midair and hurling them back at the enemy. Inspired by his display of valor his men stormed forward, overran the hostile position, but were again pinned down by increased fire. Securing a light machine gun and 3 boxes of ammunition, 1st Lt. Burke dashed through the impact area to an open knoll, set up his gun and poured a crippling fire into the ranks of the enemy, killing approximately 75. Although wounded, he ordered more ammunition, reloading and destroying 2 mortar emplacements and a machine gun position with his accurate fire. Cradling the weapon in his arms he then led his men forward, killing some 25 more of the retreating enemy and securing the objective. 1st Lt. Burke's heroic action and daring exploits inspired his small force of 35 troops. His unflinching courage and outstanding leadership reflect the highest credit upon himself, the infantry, and the U.S. Army.

== See also ==
- List of Medal of Honor recipients
- List of Korean War Medal of Honor recipients
