= Tichnor Rice Dryer and Storage Building =

Historic site in Arkansas, United States

Coordinates: 34.136339°N 91.265794°W

- U.S. National Register of Historic Places
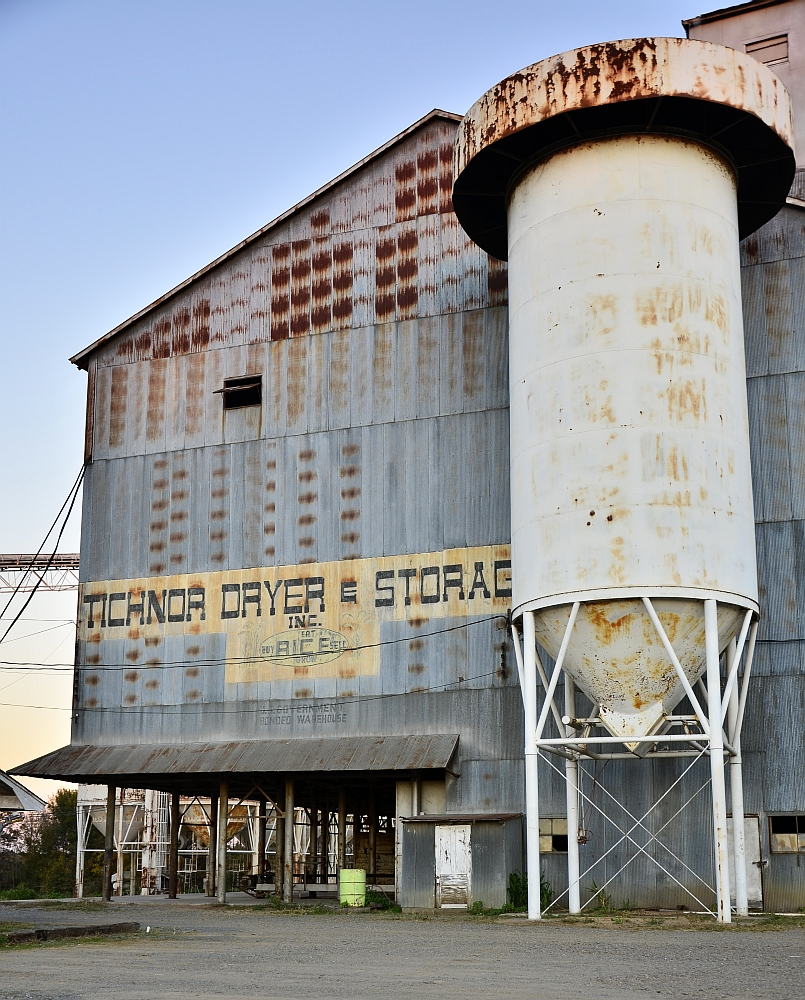
- Tichnor Rice Dryer and Storage Building

- Location within Arkansas Location within the United States
- Location: 1030 AR 44, Tichnor, Arkansas
- Area: 5.9 acres (2.4 ha)
- Built: 1956
- MPS: Cotton and Rice Farm History and Architecture in the Arkansas Delta MPS
- NRHP reference No.: 06000911
- Added to NRHP: September 22, 2006

The Tichnor Rice Dryer and Storage Building is a historic rice processing facility at 1030 Arkansas Highway 44 in Tichnor, Arkansas. It is an L-shaped structure, four stories in height, and rests on a concrete pad that is open to truck access on its north, east, southeast, and northwest elevations. It is sided in corrugated metal and has a metal gable roof. Built in 1955-56 for Woodrow Turner, it is the largest building in the small community, and remains an important facility for local rice growers to dry their crop.

The facility was listed on the National Register of Historic Places in 2006.

== See also ==
- L.A. Black Rice Milling Association Inc. Office, also in Arkansas County, Arkansas
- A.M. Bohnert Rice Plantation Pump also in Arkansas County, Arkansas
- National Register of Historic Places listings in Arkansas County, Arkansas
