= Stuttgart Commercial Historic District =

Historic district in Arkansas, United States

- U.S. National Register of Historic Places
- U.S. Historic district
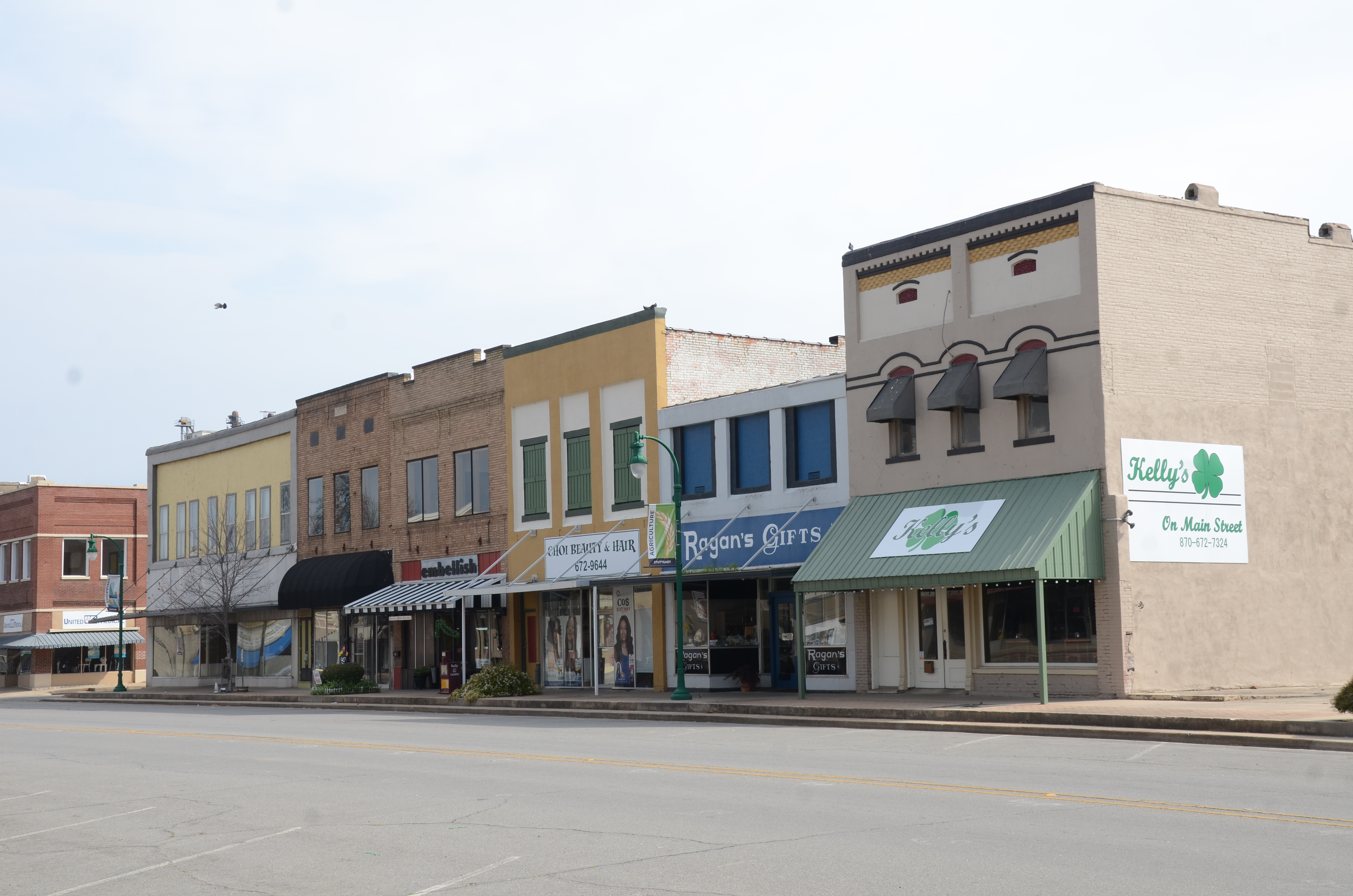
- Stuttgart Commercial Historic District

- Location within Arkansas Location within the United States
- Location: Roughly bounded by 1st St., College St., 6th St., and Maple St., Stuttgart, Arkansas
- Area: 25 acres (10 ha)
- Built: 1878
- Architect: Barrett, J.B.; et.al.
- Architectural style: Early Commercial, Classical Revival
- NRHP reference No.: 07000502
- Added to NRHP: June 4, 2007

The Stuttgart Commercial Historic District encompasses a portion of the commercial center of Stuttgart, Arkansas. The district extends along Main Street between 1st and 6th Streets, and includes a few buildings on the adjacent numbered streets as well as Maple and College Streets, which parallel Main to the west and east, respectively. The majority of the district's 76 buildings were built between about 1900 and 1920, and are brick commercial structures one or two stories in height. Notable among these buildings are the Riceland Hotel, the Standard Ice Company Building, and the county courthouse.

The district was listed on the National Register of Historic Places in 2007.

== See also ==
- National Register of Historic Places listings in Arkansas County, Arkansas
