= Crocketts Bluff Hunting Lodge =

Historic house in Arkansas, United States

- U.S. National Register of Historic Places
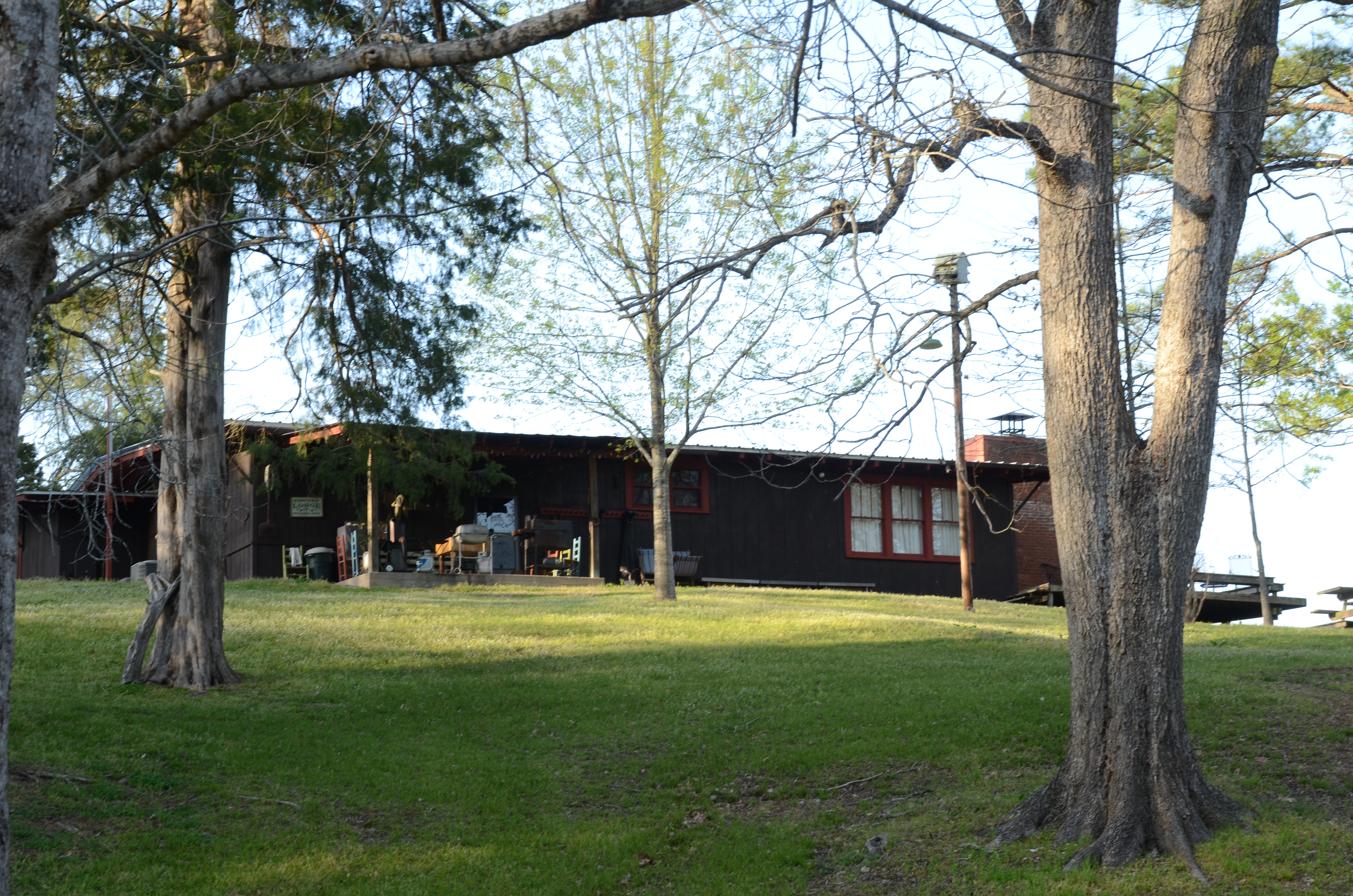

- Location within Arkansas Location within the United States
- Location: End of dirt rd. N. of pt. at which Hwy 153 turns S., Crocketts Bluff, Arkansas
- Coordinates: 34°26′53″N 91°13′14″W
- Area: 4.5 acres (1.8 ha)
- Built: 1956
- Architect: Bradley Lumber Co.; Sam Fullerton
- Architectural style: Modern Movement, Minimal Traditional/Ranch
- NRHP reference No.: 08000723
- Added to NRHP: August 1, 2008

The Crocketts Bluff Hunting Lodge is a historic hunting lodge in Crocketts Bluff, Arkansas. The lodge is symbolic of the hunting industry in the Grand Prairie of Arkansas, which is known for its plentiful duck and fish. The first lodge at this site was built in 1938 by Sam Fullerton, who owned the Bradley Lumber Company. Used primarily during duck hunting season, the lodge served to entertain Fullerton's customers in the lumber industry. In 1955, the original lodge burned down, and Fullerton's grandson S. Baker Fullerton built the present lodge in 1956 using native wood. The lodge became the property of the Potlatch Lumber Company in 1958 when it bought the Bradley Lumber Company; it was later purchased by the Frank Lyon Company in 1970, which used the lodge for duck hunting and fishing. On August 1, 2008, the lodge was added to the National Register of Historic Places.

== See also ==
- National Register of Historic Places listings in Arkansas County, Arkansas
