= Arkansas County Courthouse-Northern District =

- U.S. National Register of Historic Places
- U.S. Historic district – Contributing property
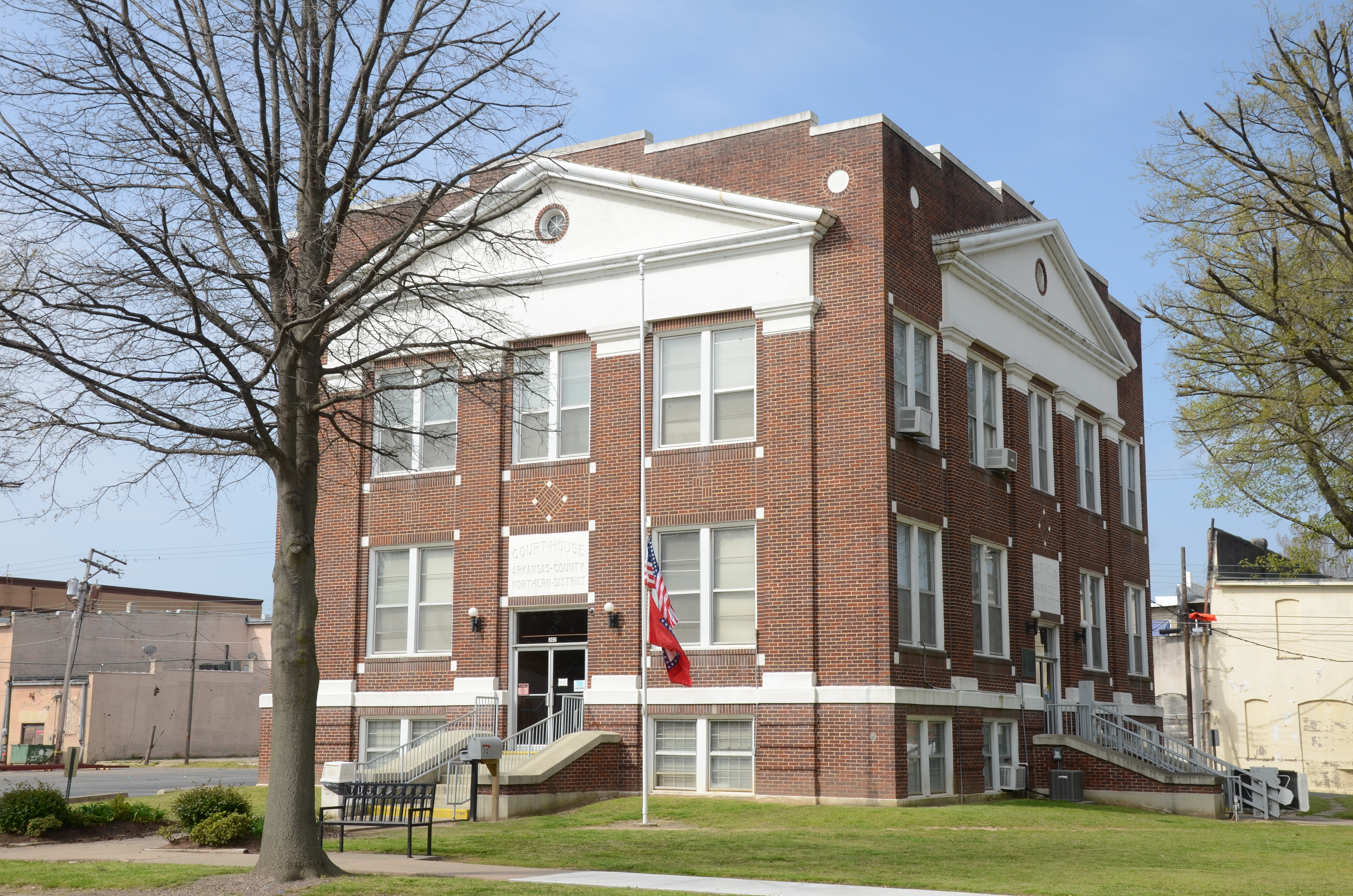

- Location within Arkansas Location within the United States
- Location: Jct. of E. 3rd and S. College Sts., SW corner, Stuttgart, Arkansas
- Coordinates: 34°29′59″N 91°33′6″W
- Area: less than one acre
- Built: 1928
- Architect: Barrett & Ogletree
- Architectural style: Classical Revival
- Part of: Stuttgart Commercial Historic District (ID07000502)
- NRHP reference No.: 92001621

Significant dates
- Added to NRHP: November 20, 1992
- Designated CP: June 4, 2007

The Arkansas County Courthouse for the Northern District is located at East 3rd and College Streets in Stuttgart, Arkansas, the seat of the northern district of Arkansas County. It is a two-story Classical Revival brick structure resting on a raised basement. It was designed by J. B. Barrett of the Stuttgart firm Barrett & Ogletree, and built in 1928, in response to the designation of rapidly growing Stuttgart as the seat of the northern district of the county. The building is an excellent local example of Classical Revival styling, with main entrances on its northern and eastern facades topped by broad pediments and entablatures, with a stepped brick parapet above.

The building was listed on the National Register of Historic Places in 1992.

== See also ==
- National Register of Historic Places listings in Arkansas County, Arkansas
