= Mary Eliza Knapp =

American landowner and scientific collector

Mary Eliza Feild Officer Knapp
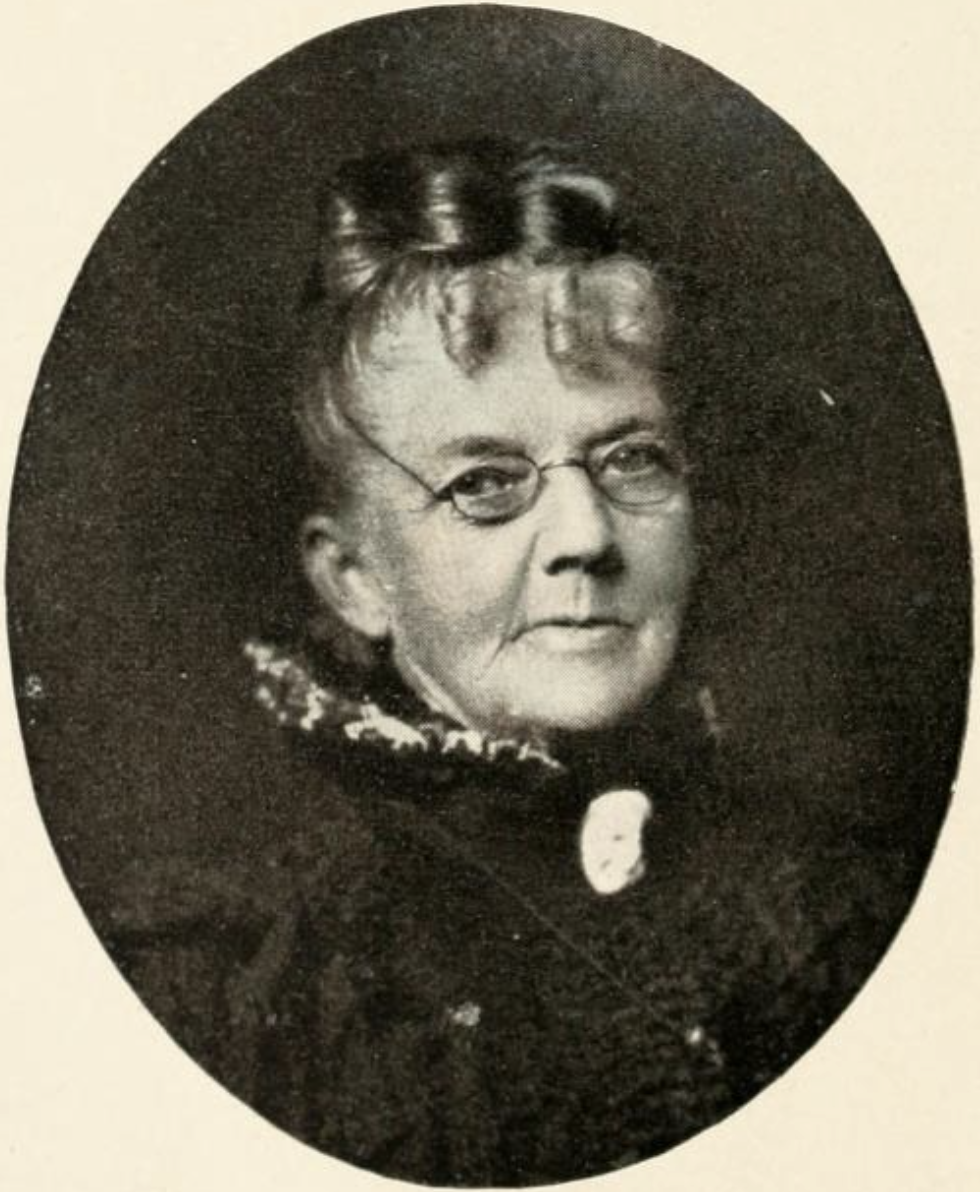
- Born: Mary Eliza Feild; July 1, 1825; Pulaski, Tennessee
- Died: March 22, 1905 (aged 79)
- Other names: Mary Eliza Officer
- Known for: Raising awareness of and collecting at what is now known as the Plum Bayou Mounds Archeological State Park, being a co-founder of The Aesthetic Club

Mary Eliza Knapp (1 July 1825 – 22 March 1905) was an American landowner, amateur archaeologist and scientific collector. She was also one of the founders of The Aesthetic Club, a women’s club formed in Arkansas in 1883.

== Biography ==
Knapp was born Mary Eliza Feild on 1 July 1825 in Pulaski, Tennessee to Mary Amanda Flournoy and her husband William Hume Feild. She married William Peay Officer in 1846. In 1849 Knapp and William purchased the land upon which the Plum Bayou Mounds Archeological State Park can now be found. William died in 1851 and Knapp subsequently purchased more land around the site not long after his death. In 1857 Knapp married Gilbert Knapp and the couple also purchased land around the site. Although Gilbert managed all the land owned by the couple, the land upon which the archeological site was located was owned by Knapp.

Knapp was interested in both history and archeology. She collected artifacts found on the site and was keen to bring the mounds and their archeological value to the attention of scientists. Knapp knew the physician William H. Barry who was also interested in the archeology of the region. She wrote him a letter describing the mounds found on the site. Barry passed her correspondence on to the Secretary of the Smithsonian, Joseph Henry. Barry encouraged Knapp to correspond with Henry and Knapp also donated artefacts she had collected from the site to the Smithsonian. Knapp's description of the site was published in the 1877 Annual report of the Board of Regents of the Smithsonian Institution. As a result of her advocacy archaeologists investigated the mounds in 1879 and 1882.

Knapp was a co-founder of The Aesthetic Club, a women's literary club formed on 16 January 1883 in Little Rock. She was also an associate writer for the Arkansas Ladies Journal.

== Death and legacy ==
Knapp died on 22 March 1905. After her death, Knapp's estate created the Knapp memorial fountain in memory of her husband Gilbert and her son Eustace Officer and herself. The memorial fountain is now part of the Little Rock Museum, Art and Heritage Trail. Knapp's contribution to the Arkansas women's suffrage movement was acknowledged when her name was added to the base of Jane DeDecker’s Every Word We Utter women’s suffrage sculpture installed at Riverfront Park in Little Rock.
