= Crocketts Bluff, Arkansas =

Unincorporated community in Arkansas, US

Coordinates: 34°26′38″N 91°13′12″W

Crocketts Bluff is an unincorporated community in Arkansas County, Arkansas, United States. It is the location of (or is the nearest community to) Crocketts Bluff Hunting Lodge, which is located at the end of the dirt road north of the point at which AR 153 turns south, and is listed on the National Register of Historic Places. Crocketts Bluff sits at an elevation of 171 feet the highest point in Arkansas County. The ZIP Code for Crocketts Bluff is 72038.

== Education ==
Residents are in the DeWitt School District. It operates DeWitt High School.
