= Old Post Office (Hot Springs, Arkansas) =

- U.S. National Register of Historic Places
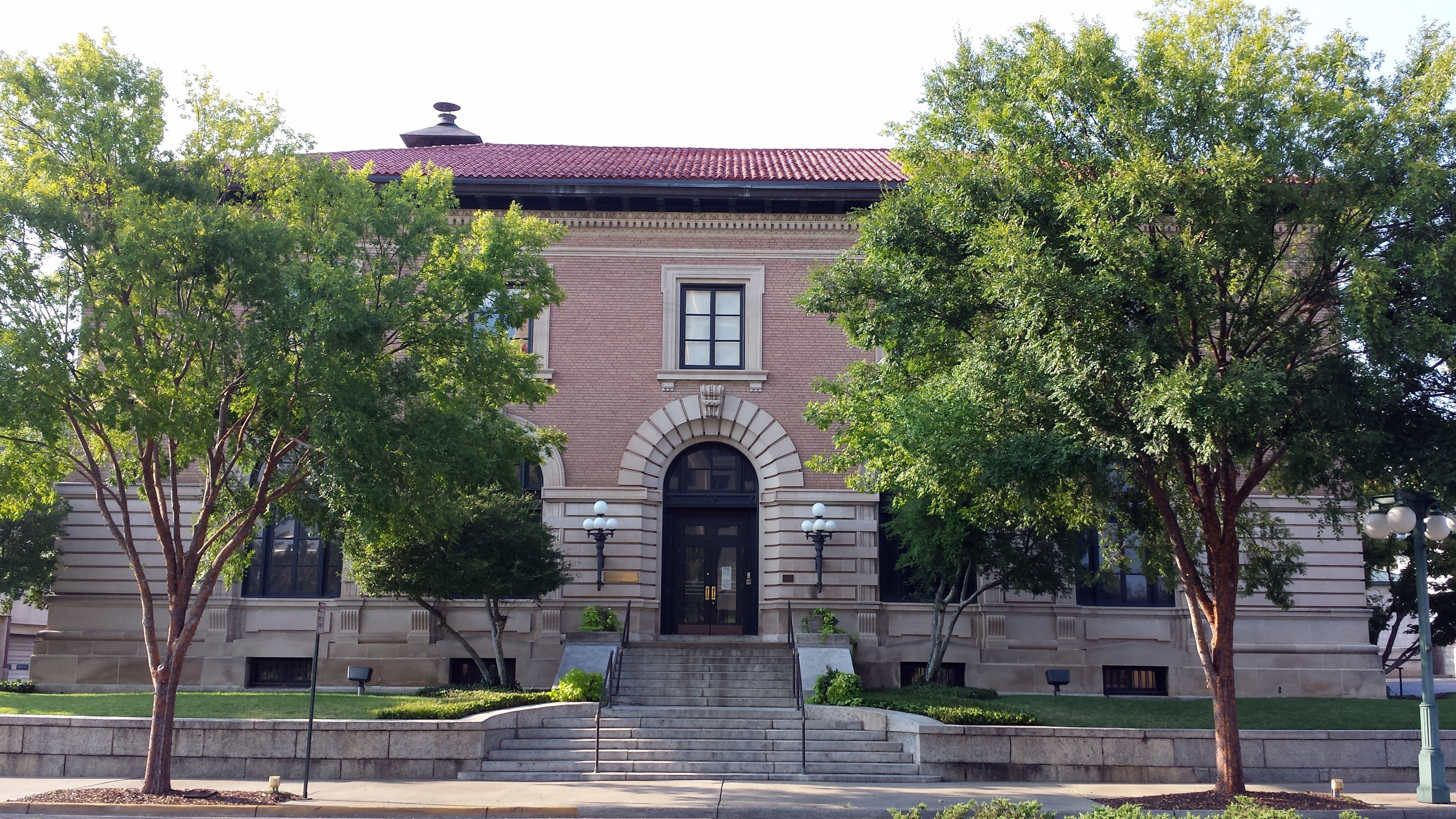

- Location within Arkansas Location within the United States
- Location: Convention Blvd., Hot Springs, Arkansas
- Coordinates: 34°30′27″N 93°2′57″W
- Area: less than one acre
- Built: 1901
- Architect: Office of the Supervising Architect under James Knox Taylor
- Architectural style: Renaissance Revival
- NRHP reference No.: 90000547
- Added to NRHP: April 12, 1990

The Old Post Office is a historic former post office building on Convention Boulevard in Hot Springs, Arkansas. It is a steel and masonry structure, two stories in height, finished in brick and stone, with Renaissance Revival styling. Its main facade is five bays wide, with a center entrance set in a round-arch entrance with an elaborate keystone. The interior lobby area has its original red marble finish, with quartersawn oak trim. The former post office was built in 1901, and is one of the city's best examples of Renaissance Revival architecture.

The building was listed on the National Register of Historic Places in 1990.

== See also ==
- National Register of Historic Places listings in Garland County, Arkansas
- List of United States post offices
