= United States Post Office (Stuttgart, Arkansas) =

- U.S. Post Office--Stuttgart
- U.S. National Register of Historic Places
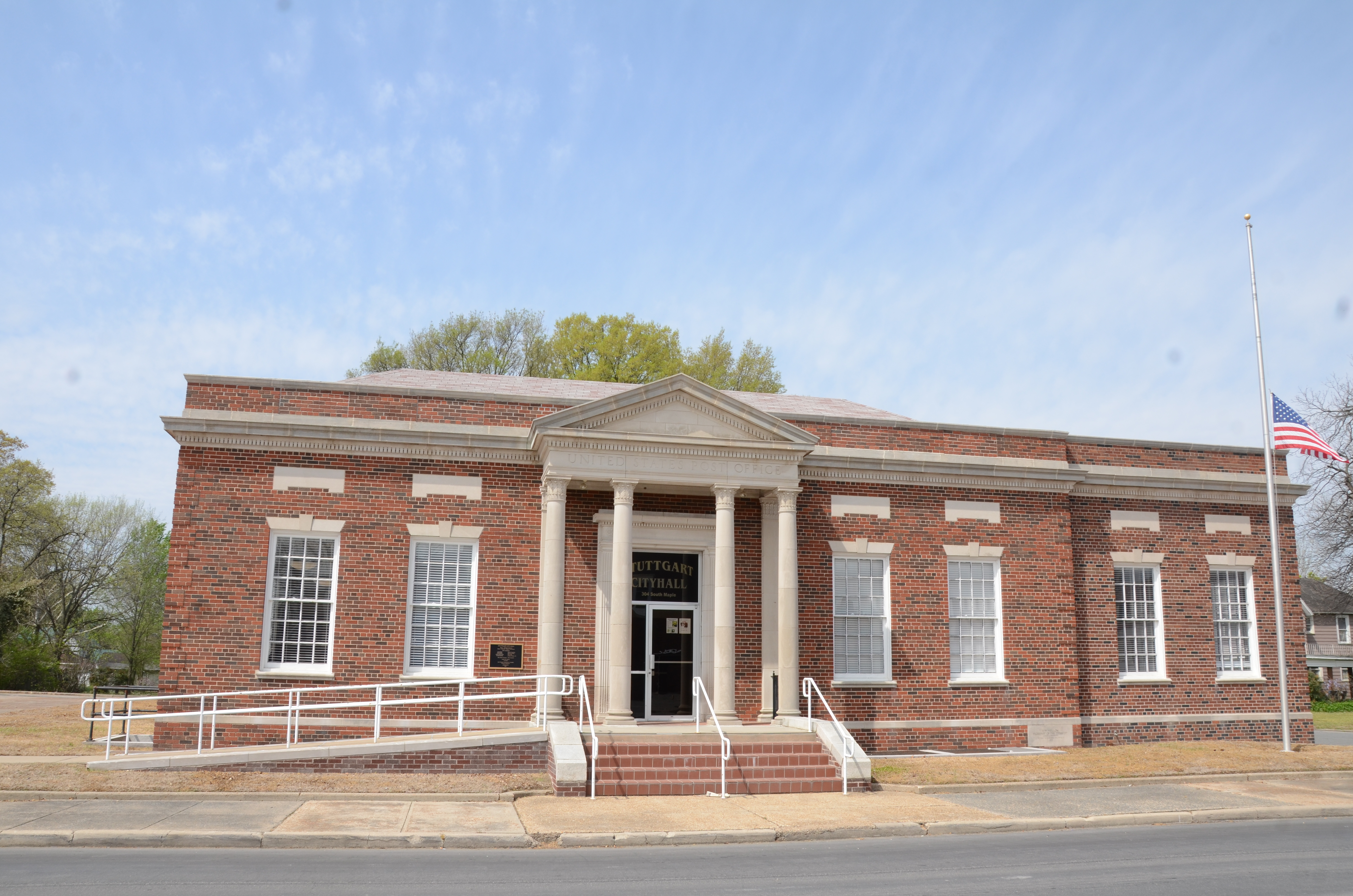

- Location within Arkansas Location within the United States
- Location: 302 S. Maple Street, Stuttgart, Arkansas
- Coordinates: 34°29′59″N 91°33′14″W
- Area: less than one acre
- Built: 1931
- Architect: Office of the Supervising Architect under James A. Wetmore, J. A. Auges
- Architectural style: Colonial Revival
- NRHP reference No.: 03001380
- Added to NRHP: January 14, 2004

The U.S. Post Office-Stuttgart is a historic post office building at 302 South Maple Street in Stuttgart, Arkansas. Built in 1931, this single-story Colonial Revival brick and limestone structure was the first purpose-built post office building in the city. A 1966 addition sensitively matched the existing building materials. The building was used by the U.S. Postal Service until 2002, and was purchased by the city, which converted it for use as city offices.

The building was listed on the National Register of Historic Places in 2004.

== See also ==
- National Register of Historic Places listings in Arkansas County, Arkansas
