= Searcy Municipal Courthouse =

- Searcy Post Office
- U.S. National Register of Historic Places
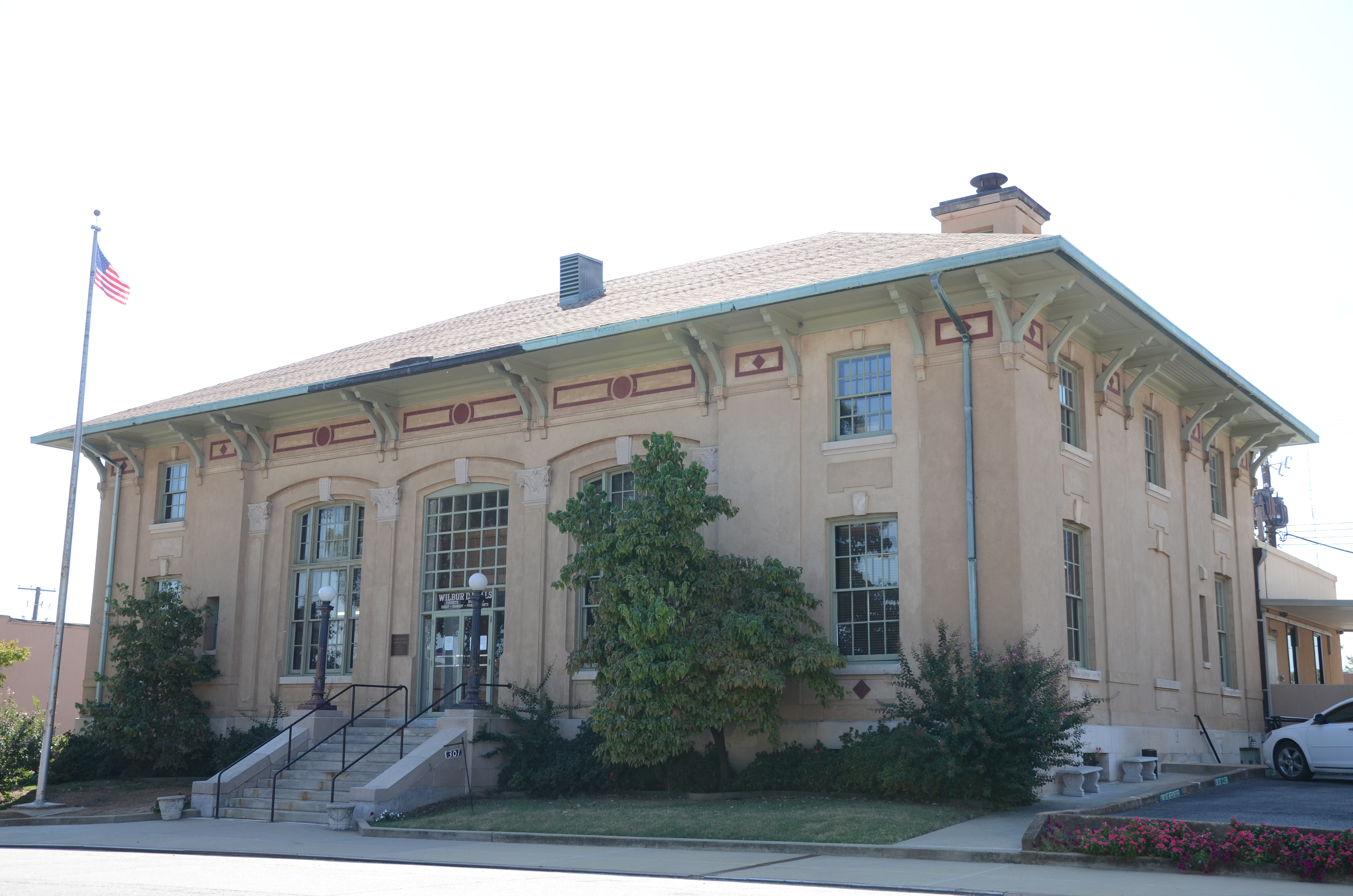

- Location within Arkansas Location within the United States
- Location: Jct. of Gum and Arch Sts., SW corner, Searcy, Arkansas
- Coordinates: 35°14′59″N 91°44′24″W
- Area: less than one acre
- Built: 1914
- Architect: Office of the Supervising Architect under Oscar Wenderoth
- Architectural style: Italian Renaissance Revival
- MPS: White County MPS
- NRHP reference No.: 91001200
- Added to NRHP: July 20, 1992

The Searcy Municipal Courthouse, formerly the Searcy Post Office is a historic government building at Gum and Arch Streets in downtown Searcy, Arkansas. It is a two-story brick building with Renaissance Revival styling. The central bays of its main facade are articulated by paneled pilasters of the Corinthian order, with large two-story windows flanking a two-story entrance, all set in recessed segmented-arch openings. The shallow hipped roof has elongated eaves with large brackets. The building was designed by Oscar Wenderoth and built in 1914, and is the only high-style Renaissance Revival building in White County.

The building was listed on the National Register of Historic Places in 1992.

== See also ==
- National Register of Historic Places listings in White County, Arkansas
