= Gillett High School (Arkansas) =

Location
- 507 Champion; Gillett, Arkansas 72055; United States
- Coordinates: 34°6′52″N 91°22′58″W

Information
- Status: Closed
- School district: Gillett School District (-2004); DeWitt School District (2004-2009)
- Yearbook: The Wolf
- Website: web.archive.org/*/http://dewittschooldistrict.net:80/schools/ghs.html

Gillett High School was a public secondary school in Gillett, Arkansas, located in Arkansas County. It was originally a part of the Gillett School District and became a part of the DeWitt School District on July 1, 2004. Gillett High closed in 2009, and high school students in Gillett now attend DeWitt High School.

== History ==
Gillett High School named its sports team Wolves and the school colors were orange and black. The Wolves football team made the state playoffs 23 times before the football team was ended in 2007, because of the failure to find a new head coach. In 2003, Gillett School District came under former Governor Mike Huckabee's rural school consolidation act. The bill required all school districts with fewer than 350 students to join with a neighboring school district. As a result, Gillett School District consolidated with the De Witt School District along with the Humphrey School District beginning with the 2004-2005 school year. After that year, the school board closed Humphrey High School leaving Gillett High School the smallest public school in the state of Arkansas.

The middle and high school in Gillett stopped operations in 2009. On April 28, 2009 the De Witt school board voted to close Gillett High and bus the students to neighboring DeWitt High School beginning with the 2009-2010 school year. The doors were closed for good on June 30, 2009.

== Athletics ==
The Gillett Coon Supper, held every year, was used to finance the Gillett High American football team; it became a scholarship fundraiser when the high school closed.
