= DeWitt School District =

School district in Arkansas

Location
- 1841 S. Grandview Drive, DeWitt, AR 72042 Arkansas United States

District information
- Type: Public (government funded)
- Schools: 4
- NCES District ID: 0500001

Students and staff
- Students: 1,362
- Teachers: 127.77
- Staff: 222.77
- Student–teacher ratio: 10.66

Other information
- Website: www.dewittdragons.net

DeWitt School District No. 1 is a school district based in the town of DeWitt, Arkansas, United States. The DeWitt School District is geographically the state's largest school district with 872.29 square miles (2,259.2 km^{2}) of land and 46.18 square miles (119.6 km^{2}) of water, encompassing portions of Arkansas and Jefferson, and Desha counties.

It operates three schools, including DeWitt High School, DeWitt Middle School, and DeWitt Elementary School.

== Service area ==
The municipalities it serves include DeWitt, Almyra, Gillett, Saint Charles, and Humphrey.

Additionally the district includes unincorporated areas: Arkansas Post, Bayou Meto, Crocketts Bluff, Eldridge Corner, Ethel, Nady, One Horse Store, Point Deluce, Reydell, Stinking Bay, and Tichnor. Some areas with "Altheimer, Arkansas" postal addresses may be in the district boundaries.

The 2010 U.S. census indicated the district included a portion of Lincoln County, but in the 2020 U.S. census that area was shown as being in Jefferson County.

The 2010 census also indicated the district included a portion of Desha County, but in 2020 that portion was indicated as now being in Arkansas County (while still being in the DeWitt school district).

== History ==
By the 1950s a school district in Jefferson County had been annexed into the DeWitt district.

In 1966 the Arkansas County School District dissolved, with portions going to the DeWitt school district and others going to the St. Charles School District and other districts.

On July 1, 1985, the St. Charles district consolidated into the DeWitt district. On July 1, 2004, the Gillett School District and the Humphrey School District consolidated into the DeWitt district.

DeWitt	St. Charles	Gillett	Humphrey
DeWitt	Gillett	Humphrey
DeWitt

== Schools ==
Schools:

- DeWitt High School is a comprehensive public high school for students in grades 9 through 12. In 2007-2008 it had approximately 350 students and 35 teachers. Ethnically, the school is 81% Caucasian, 18% African-American, and less than 1% Hispanic with very few students of other backgrounds. DeWitt High School is a closed campus. Students are not allowed to leave campus without permission to sign out. During school year, the school day runs from 8 AM to 3:15 PM, Monday through Friday. DeWitt High School's mascot is the Dragon. Its colors are blue and gold. Lunch and breakfast are served daily.
- DeWitt Middle School, located in DeWitt and serving more than 300 students in grades 6 through 8.
- DeWitt Elementary School, located in DeWitt and serving students in kindergarten through grade 5.
  - Previously known as Southside Elementary School, it had 480 students in 2012.

Former schools:

- Gillett High School (closed in 2009)
- Gillett Elementary School, located in Gillett, serving prekindergarten through grade 5.
  - The final facility was built in the 1950s. In 2010 the school had 81 students, and in 2012 the school had 74 students. In 2012 the DeWitt School District board voted in favor of closing Gillett Elementary, but it had to ask the Arkansas Board of Education for approval of the closure. The state board denied the closure request 5-2. Several area donors promised to raise $68,000 per year to keep the school open.
- Humphrey Elementary School - Closed in 2009

== Student body and staff ==
As of 2014 the district had about 1,264 students, with most of them originating from Arkansas County. The highest enrollment occurred around 2008-2009, when the student population exceeded 1,600.

In 2014 the district had 77 classified employees and 110 licensed employees.

== Notable alumni ==
- Winston Bryant—Politician; former Arkansas Secretary of State, Lt. Governor, and Attorney General
