= Humphrey School District =

Defunct school district in Arkansas, United States

Humphrey School District No. 7 was a school district operating public schools serving Humphrey, Arkansas. It was administratively divided into two schools: Humphrey Elementary School and Humphrey High School.

In the 2001–2002 school year the district had about 270 students on an average school day, with about 124 of them taking school bus transportation to their school.

On July 1, 2004, it, along with the Gillett School District, consolidated into the DeWitt School District.

DeWitt	St. Charles	Gillett	Humphrey
DeWitt	Gillett	Humphrey
DeWitt
