= DeWitt Post Office =

United States historic post office

- U.S. National Register of Historic Places
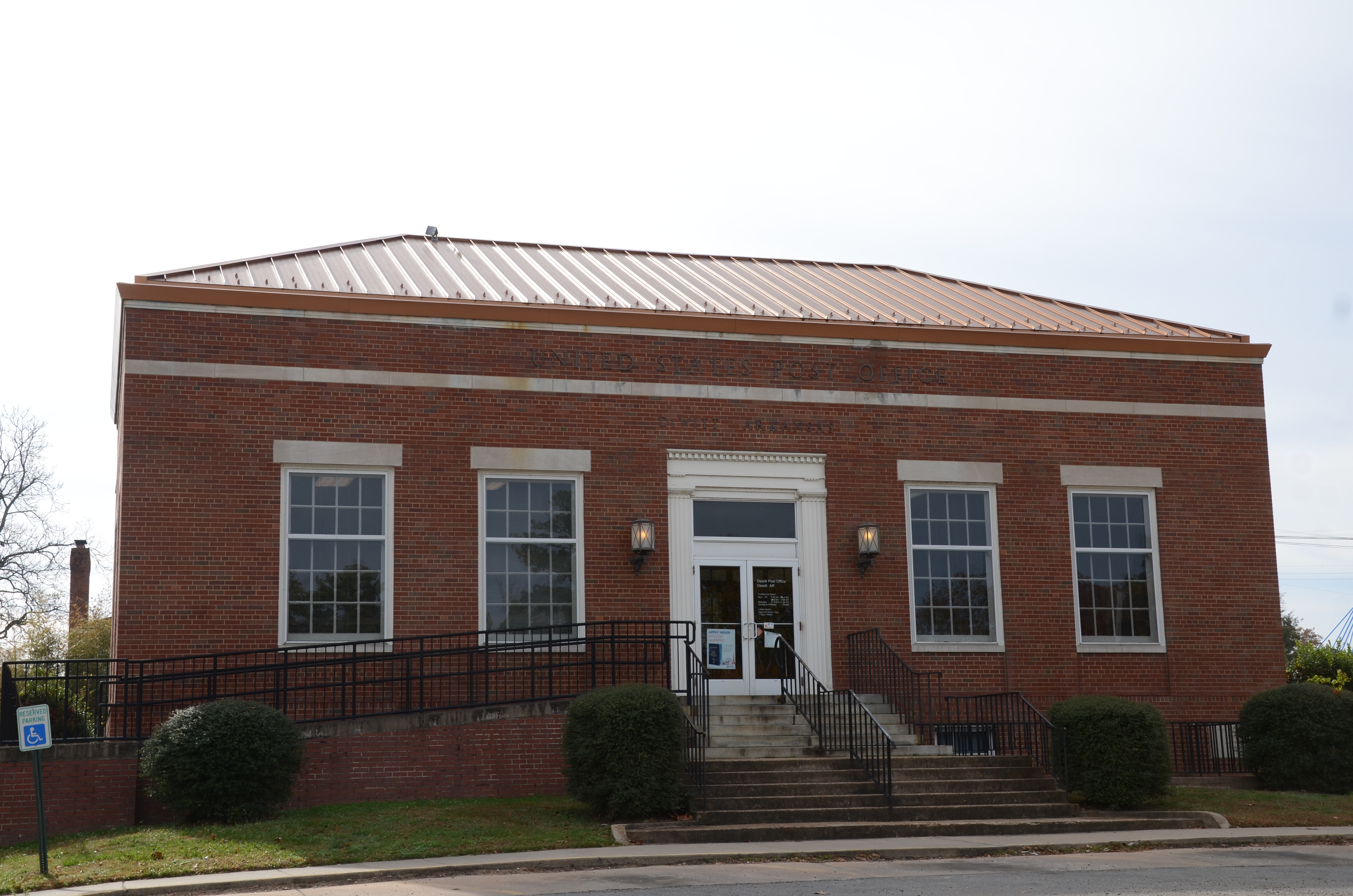

- Location within Arkansas Location within the United States
- Location: 221 W. Cross St., DeWitt, Arkansas
- Coordinates: 34°17′42″N 91°20′14″W
- Area: less than one acre
- Built: 1939
- Architect: Office of the Supervising Architect under Louis A. Simon
- Artist: William Traher
- Architectural style: Colonial Revival
- MPS: Post Offices with Section Art in Arkansas MPS
- NRHP reference No.: 98000915
- Added to NRHP: August 14, 1998

The DeWitt Post Office is a historic post office at 221 West Cross Street, DeWitt, Arkansas. It is a modest single-story brick and masonry structure with a hip roof, built in 1939 in a restrained Colonial Revival style. It is a basically rectangular structure, with a loading dock area projecting from the center of the rear. The building is notable for the murals in its lobby area, painted by William Traher of Denver, Colorado, and paid for with funds from the United States Treasury Department's Section of Fine Arts, a Depression-era project to support artists.

The building was listed on the National Register of Historic Places in 1998.

== See also ==
- National Register of Historic Places listings in Arkansas County, Arkansas
- List of United States post offices
- List of United States post office murals
