= Plum Bayou Mounds Archeological State Park =

Archaeological site from the Late Woodland period in Arkansas

Plum Bayou Mounds
- Toltec Mounds
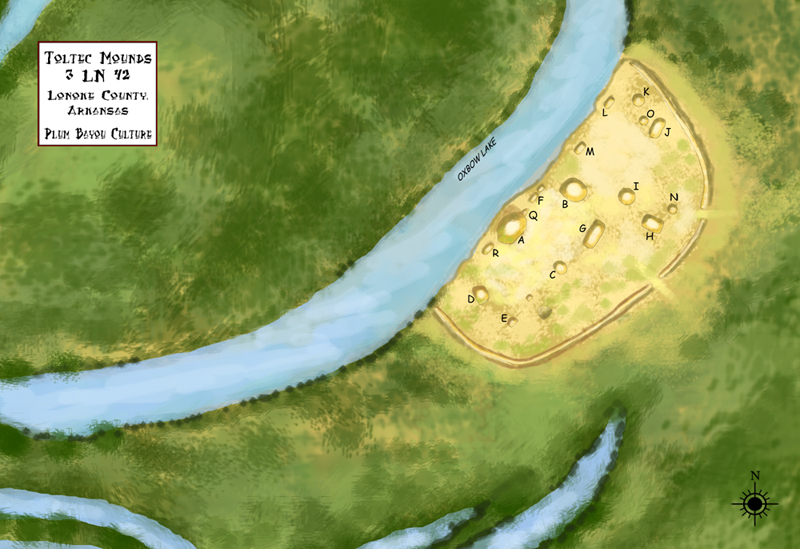
- Artist's conception of the archaeological site

- Location in North America
- 34°38′49″N 92°3′55″W
- Type: Settlement
- Cultures: Plum Bayou culture
- Location: Lonoke County, Arkansas, US
- Region: Central Arkansas

History
- Built: 7th century
- Abandoned: 11th century

Site notes
- Architectural styles: platform mounds, burial mounds, plazas
- Owner: Government of Arkansas
- Management: Arkansas State Parks
- Public access: Yes
- Website: Official website
- Plum Bayou Mounds Site
- U.S. National Register of Historic Places
- U.S. National Historic Landmark
- NRHP reference No.: 73000382

Significant dates
- Added to NRHP: January 12, 1973
- Designated NHL: June 2, 1978
- Responsible body: State

Plum Bayou Mounds Archeological State Park (3 LN 42), formerly known as "Toltec Mounds Archeological State Park", also known as Knapp Mounds, Toltec Mounds or Toltec Mounds site, is an archaeological site from the Late Woodland period in Arkansas that protects an 18-mound complex with the tallest surviving prehistoric mounds in Arkansas. The site is on the banks of Mound Lake, an oxbow lake of the Arkansas River. It was occupied by its original inhabitants from the 7th to the 11th century. The site is designated as a National Historic Landmark.

== Name ==
The identification of the site with the Toltec of Mexico was a 19th-century misinterpretation. It was thought that the Toltec people lived in North America and built the mounds.

Originally, the name Plum Bayou was borrowed from a nearby waterway and applied to the distinctive culture of the site, discussed below. The site was officially renamed in November 2022 following consultation with the Quapaw Nation and the Arkansas Archaeological Survey.

== Preservation history ==
Mary Knapp was the co-owner of the land from 1849 to 1905. She and her first husband purchased the land in 1849, and the land passed to her after his death. She and her second husband made subsequent land purchases near the site. Mary was interested in archeology and had become acquainted with Dr. William Barry who was also interested in Native American artifacts and customs. Mary entered into correspondence with Barry discussing the "Toltec Mounds" site and Barry passed her letter on to Joseph Henry, the secretary of the Smithsonian Institution. Mary would go on to correspond directly with Henry as well as forward artefacts she had collected from the site to the Smithsonian.

This would lead to investigations at the site by archaeologist Edward Palmer from the Smithsonian Institutions Bureau of American Ethnology in 1883 as well as by others which proved that the indigenous ancestors of regional Native Americans built these mounds and all other mounds within the present-day United States. They were part of mound building cultures that flourished from the Late Archaic period into the Protohistoric period. They built earthwork mounds for religious, political and ceremonial purposes, connecting them to their cosmology.

Longtime Arkansas Archaeological Survey research archeologist Martha Rolingson worked to develop research and exhibits to convince the state to purchase the property and preserve it as a state park. It listed on the National Register of Historic Places in 1973, purchased by the state in 1975, and the state park opened in 1980. The site was declared a National Historic Landmark in 1978, and an Arkansas State Archeological Landmark in 2025.

== Plum Bayou culture ==
The people who built the mounds at Plum Bayou Mounds had a culture distinct from other contemporary Native American groups in the Mississippi Valley. Plum Bayou sites are found throughout the White River and Arkansas River floodplains of central and eastern Arkansas, but are also found as far west as the eastern Ozark Mountains. Plum Bayou Mounds is the largest site of the eponymous culture. Their relationships with neighboring cultures such as the Coles Creek culture to the south and Fourche Maline culture to the southwest are still under investigation. The people lived in permanent villages and hamlets throughout the countryside. They built sturdy houses, farmed, gathered wild plants, fished, and hunted.

=== Plum Bayou Mounds Site ===
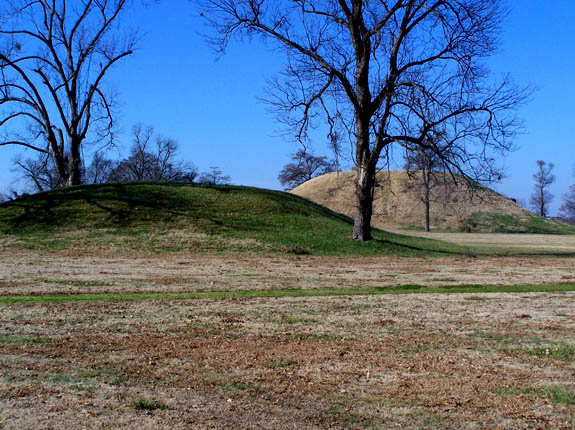
Two mounds at the site

Mound groups, such as this one, were religious and social centers for people living in the surrounding countryside. Plum Bayou Mounds itself had a small population, made up primarily of political and religious leaders of the community and their families. This center was occupied from the 7th to the 11th century.

Located on the banks of an oxbow lake, the archaeological site once had an 8–10-foot-high (2.4–3.0 m) and 5,298-foot-long (1,615 m) earthen embankment and ditch on three sides. The other side was the lake, now called Mound Pond. Eighteen mounds were built inside the high curving 1 mile embankment, and two were originally 38 and 49 feet (12 and 15 m) high. Mounds were placed along the edges of two open areas (plazas) which were used for political, religious, and social activities attended by people from the vicinity. At least two mounds were used for feasting, as indicated by discarded food remains. Deer were a favorite food. Mound locations seem to have been planned using principles based on the alignment with important solar positions and standardized units of measurement. Most of the mounds were flat-topped platform mounds with buildings on them. Other Native Americans lived on the site in the 15th century, but they did not build the mounds.

== Culture, phase and chronological table for the Plum Bayou Mound site ==
| Period | Lower Yazoo Phase | Dates | Tensas/Natchez Phase | Toltec Phase | Dates |
|---|---|---|---|---|---|
| Historic | Russell | 1650–1750 CE | Tensas/Natchez | Quapaw ? | 1673 |
| Plaquemine/Mississippian culture Late Plaquemine/Mississippian; Middle Plaquemine/Mississippian; Early Plaquemine/Mississippian | Wasp Lake | 1400–1650 CE | Transylvania/Emerald | Quapaw ? | 1650 |
| Plaquemine/Mississippian culture Late Plaquemine/Mississippian; Middle Plaquemine/Mississippian; Early Plaquemine/Mississippian | Lake George | 1300–1400 CE | Fitzhugh/Foster | – | – |
| Plaquemine/Mississippian culture Late Plaquemine/Mississippian; Middle Plaquemine/Mississippian; Early Plaquemine/Mississippian | Winterville | 1200–1300 CE | Routh/Anna | – | – |
| Transitional Coles Creek | Crippen Point | 1050–1200 CE | Preston/Gordon | – | – |
| Coles Creek culture Late Coles Creek; Middle Coles Creek; Early Coles Creek | Kings Crossing | 950–1050 CE | Balmoral | – | – |
| Coles Creek culture Late Coles Creek; Middle Coles Creek; Early Coles Creek | Aden | 800–950 CE | Ballina | Steele Bend | 750–900 CE |
| Coles Creek culture Late Coles Creek; Middle Coles Creek; Early Coles Creek | Bayland | 600–800 CE | Sundown | Dortch Bend | 600–750 CE |
| Baytown culture Baytown 2 Baytown 1 | Deasonville | 500–600 CE | Marsden | Dooley Bend | 400–600 CE |
| Baytown culture Baytown 2 Baytown 1 | Little Sunflower | 400–500 CE | Indian Bayou | – | – |
| Marksville culture Late Marksville; Early Marksville | Issaquena | 200–400 CE | Issaquena | – | – |
| Marksville culture Late Marksville; Early Marksville | Anderson Landing | 0–200 CE | Point Lake/Grand Gulf | – | – |
| Tchefuncte culture | Tuscola | 400 BCE–0 CE | Panther Lake | – | – |

Table taken from "Emerging Patterns of Plum Bayou Culture:Preliminary Investigations of the Toltec Mounds Research Project", by Martha Ann Rolingson, 1982.

== See also ==
- Poverty Point
- Watson Brake
