= Gillett, Arkansas =

- City
- Location of Gillett in Arkansas County, Arkansas.
- Coordinates: 34°07′19″N 91°22′33″W
- Country: United States
- State: Arkansas
- County: Arkansas

Area
  - Total: 1.00 sq mi (2.58 km^{2})
  - Land: 1.00 sq mi (2.58 km^{2})
  - Water: 0 sq mi (0.00 km^{2})
- Elevation: 187 ft (57 m)

Population (2020)
  - Total: 564
  - Estimate (2025): 619 ▲
  - Density: 566.0/sq mi (218.54/km^{2})
- Time zone: UTC-6 (Central (CST))
  - Summer (DST): UTC-5 (CDT)
- ZIP code: 72055
- Area code: 870
- FIPS code: 05-26980
- GNIS feature ID: 2403696
- Website: encyclopediaofarkansas.net/..

Gillett (/dʒɪlˌlɛt/ jill-LET) is a city in Arkansas County, Arkansas, United States. As of the 2020 census, Gillett had a population of 564. Gillett is the home of the annual Gillett Coon Supper. The Arkansas Post National Memorial is located southeast of the town.

The largest alligator ever killed in Arkansas was harpooned near Gillett on September 19, 2010. The 13-ft, 1-in reptile weighed 680 lb.

== Geography ==
According to the United States Census Bureau, the city has a total area of 1.0 square mile (2.6 km^{2}), of which almost all 1.0 square mile (2.6 km^{2}) is land.

== Education ==
The community is served by the DeWitt School District, including Gillett Elementary School, DeWitt Middle School, and DeWitt High School. Gillett High School served the community until its 2009 closure.

On July 1, 2004, the Gillett School District, along with the Humphrey School District, consolidated into the DeWitt district.

Gillett Elementary School serves prekindergarten through grade 5. The current facility was built in the 1950s. In 2010 the school had 81 students, and in 2012 the school had 74 students. In 2012, the DeWitt School District board voted in favor of closing Gillett Elementary, but it had to ask the Arkansas Board of Education for approval. The state board denied the closure request 5-2. Several area donors promised to raise $68,000 per year to keep the school open.

== Parks and recreation ==
The Gillett Coon Supper, held every year, was used to finance the Gillett High American football team; it became a scholarship fundraiser when the high school closed.

== Demographics ==
Historical population
Census	Pop.	Note	%±
1910	256		—
1920	1,155		351.2%
1930	870		−24.7%
1940	781		−10.2%
1950	774		−0.9%
1960	874		12.9%
1970	860		−1.6%
1980	927		7.8%
1990	883		−4.7%
2000	819		−7.2%
2010	691		−15.6%
2020	564		−18.4%
2025 (est.)	619	▲	9.8%
U.S. Decennial Census

As of the census of 2000, 819 people, 356 households, and 242 families were in the city. The population density was 783.5 people/sq mi (301.2/km^{2}). The racial makeup of the city was 87.18% White, 12.58% African American, 1.20% Native American, and 1.02% from other races. About 0.37% of the population were Latino of any race.

Of the 356 households, 31.5% had children under the age of 18 living with them, 52.8% were married couples living together, 11.0% had a female householder with no husband present, and 32.0% were not families. About 28.4% of all households were made up of individuals, and 15.2% had someone living alone who was 65 or older. The average household size was 2.30, and the average family size was 2.82.

In the city, the age distribution was 24.8% under 18, 7.0% from 18 to 24, 26.0% from 25 to 44, 24.2% from 45 to 64, and 18.1% who were 65 or older. The median age was 41 years. For every 100 females, there were 91.8 males. For every 100 females age 18 and over, there were 87.8 males.

The median income for a household in the city was $31,538, and for a family was $36,719. Males had a median income of $27,308 versus $19,219 for females. The per capita income for the city was $17,247. About 12.1% of families and 12.5% of the population were below the poverty line, including 20.3% of those under age 18 and 9.7% of those age 65 or over.

== Coon Supper ==
Since the 1940s, the town has held an annual "Coon Supper", a fundraiser in which attendees are served raccoon meat. The Wall Street Journal described it as a "rite of passage" for Arkansas politicians. Bill Clinton was involved in a plane crash on the way to the supper in 1987.

== Notable people ==
- Marion Berry, U.S. representative from Arkansas
