= Baytown culture =

Pre-Columbian Native American culture

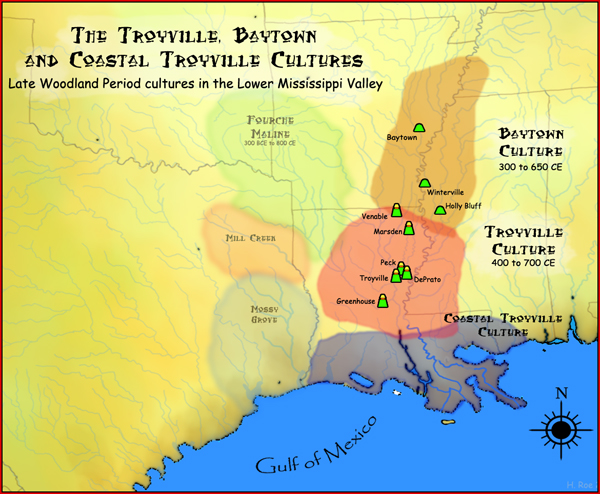
Map showing the geographic extent of the Baytown, Coastal Troyville and Troyville cultures

The Baytown culture was a Pre-Columbian Native American culture that existed from 300 to 700 CE in the lower Mississippi River Valley, consisting of sites in eastern Arkansas, western Tennessee, Louisiana, and western Mississippi. The Baytown Site on the White River in Monroe County, Arkansas is the type site for culture. It was a Baytown Period culture during the Late Woodland period. It was contemporaneous with the Coastal Troyville and Troyville cultures of Louisiana and Mississippi (all three had evolved from the Marksville Hopewellian peoples) and the Fourche Maline culture and was succeeded by the Plum Bayou culture. Where the Baytown peoples built dispersed settlements, the Troyville people instead continued building major earthwork centers.

== Decline of the Hopewell ==
Archeologists have traditionally viewed the Late Woodland (about 1,500 to 1,000 years ago) as a time of cultural decline after the florescence of the Hopewell peoples. Late Woodland sites, with the exception of sites along the Florida Gulf Coast, tend to be small when compared with Middle Woodland sites. There are several possible explanations.

- Populations increased beyond the carrying capacity of the land, and, as the elaborate trade system broke down, with groups resorted to raiding rather than trading with other territories to acquire important resources.
- The rapid replacement of the spear and atlatl with the bow-and-arrow quickly decimated the large game animals, interrupting the hunting component of food procurement and resulting in settlements breaking down into smaller units to better exploit local resources.
- Colder climate conditions about 1,600 years ago may have affected yields of gathered foods, such as nuts or starchy seeds.
- Intensified horticulture became so successful that increased agricultural production may have reduced variation in food resource availability between differing areas. Although, this reliance on agriculture with only a few types of plants, would have carried with it a risk where variations in rainfall or climate could have caused shortages, leading to famines.

In all probability these 4 theories are quite inter-related and may have all played a role in the development of the Baytown culture. Although few outstanding works of prehistoric art or architecture can be attributed to this time period, analysis shows that throughout the Southeast, the Late Woodland was a very dynamic period. Bow-and-arrow technology, allowing for increased hunting efficiency, and new varieties of maize, beans, and squash gained importance, which greatly supplemented existing native seed and root plants. Although settlement size was small, there was an increase in the number of Late Woodland sites over Middle Woodland sites, indicating a population increase. These factors tend to mark the Late Woodland period as an expansive period, not one of a cultural collapse.

== Material culture ==
=== Diet ===
Baytown people grew domesticated plants native to eastern North America, such as maygrass, little barley, amaranth, and chenopodium, with lesser amounts of sunflower, sumpweed, knotweed, squash, and bottle gourd. Acorns and hickory nuts were important in the diet, as well as wild fruits such as persimmons, plums, cherries, and various berries and grapes. People hunted white-tailed deer, squirrels, raccoons, turkeys, passenger pigeons, and migratory wildfowl using bows and arrows. They caught various species of fish and aquatic turtles, depending on what lived in the nearby bodies of water.

=== Pottery ===
Distinctive styles of flat-based pottery jars, hemispherical bowls, and stone points used on atlatl darts are associated with the Baytown culture. Plum Bayou culture developed out of Baytown culture; and there is not a sharp dividing line between the two. They overlap in time, and pottery designs and decorative motifs of the Plum Bayou culture were found at the Baytown Site, indicating that use of that site continued after 650 CE. Mulberry Creek Cord Marked, Larto Red, Coles Creek Incised, and Officer Punctated ceramics were found at the Baytown Site.

== See also ==
- Culture, phase, and chronological table for the Mississippi Valley
