= Baytown Site =

Place in Arkansas listed on National Register of Historic Places

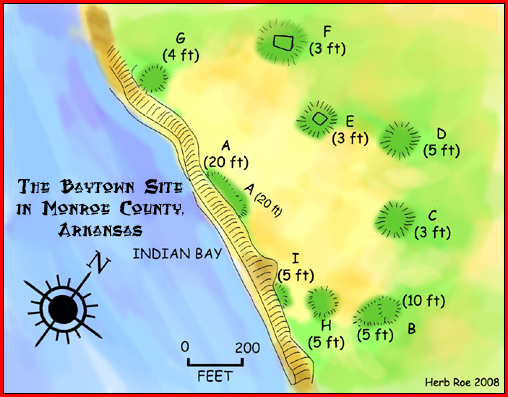
- Cultures: Baytown culture, Plum Bayou culture
- Location: Indian Bay, Arkansas, Monroe County, Arkansas, USA
- Region: Monroe County, Arkansas

Site notes
- Architectural styles: platform mounds, plaza
- Baytown Site
- U.S. National Register of Historic Places
- NRHP reference No.: 76000440.
- Added to NRHP: May 13, 1976

The Baytown Site (3 MO 1) is a Pre-Columbian Native American archaeological site located on the White River at Indian Bay, in Monroe County, Arkansas. It was first inhabited by peoples of the Baytown culture (300 to 700 CE) and later briefly by peoples of the Plum Bayou culture (650 to 1050 CE), in a time known as the Late Woodland period. It is considered the type site of the Baytown culture.

The site was added to the National Register of Historic Places on May 13, 1976, as NRIS number 76000440.

== Description ==
The site consisted of nine platform mounds arranged around an open plaza. The two tallest mounds were 20 feet (6.1 m) and 10 feet (3.0 m) in height, with others standing at 5 feet (1.5 m) in height or less.

== See also ==
- National Register of Historic Places listings in Monroe County, Arkansas
- Culture, phase, and chronological table for the Mississippi Valley
