= Gillett School District (Arkansas) =

Defunct school district in Arkansas, United States

The Gillett School District, also known as Gillett Public Schools, was a school district headquartered in Gillett, Arkansas.

As of circa 2000 it had about 280 students. It was administratively divided into two schools: Gillett Elementary School and Gillett High School.

On July 1, 2004, it, along with the Humphrey School District, consolidated into the DeWitt School District.

DeWitt	St. Charles	Gillett	Humphrey
DeWitt	Gillett	Humphrey
DeWitt
