= List of lakes of Arkansas County, Arkansas =

There are at least 109 named lakes and reservoirs in Arkansas County, Arkansas.

== Lakes ==
- Bark Shanty Lake, 34°26′02″N 91°10′34″W, el. 154 feet (47 m)
- Bay Bayou, 34°04′03″N 91°24′29″W, el. 164 feet (50 m)
- Bear Lake, 34°13′35″N 91°05′26″W, el. 141 feet (43 m)
- Bear Pond, 33°58′24″N 91°09′07″W, el. 138 feet (42 m)
- Benson Lake, 34°18′49″N 91°35′14″W, el. 184 feet (56 m)
- Big Horseshoe Lake, 34°18′22″N 91°04′41″W, el. 144 feet (44 m)
- Big White Lake, 34°16′47″N 91°05′21″W, el. 144 feet (44 m)
- Black Lake, 34°06′11″N 91°09′11″W, el. 141 feet (43 m)
- Brooks Lake, 34°06′51″N 91°09′16″W, el. 135 feet (41 m)
- Brushy Lake, 34°18′28″N 91°05′12″W, el. 151 feet (46 m)
- Brushy Lake, 34°25′41″N 91°10′15″W, el. 154 feet (47 m)
- Burnt Lake, 34°13′46″N 91°06′45″W, el. 144 feet (44 m)
- Cocklebur Lakes, 34°18′53″N 91°03′51″W, el. 144 feet (44 m)
- Columbus Lake, 34°11′41″N 91°06′53″W, el. 138 feet (42 m)
- Cooks Lake, 34°29′45″N 91°16′10″W, el. 151 feet (46 m)
- Covington Lake, 34°16′05″N 91°05′39″W, el. 144 feet (44 m)
- Cox Cypress Lake, 34°17′30″N 91°37′22″W, el. 180 feet (55 m)
- Crane Lake, 34°11′52″N 91°05′42″W, el. 141 feet (43 m)
- Crockett Lake, 34°25′16″N 91°11′38″W, el. 151 feet (46 m)
- Ditch Lake, 34°25′13″N 91°10′03″W, el. 154 feet (47 m)
- Drainie Lake, 34°08′35″N 91°10′02″W, el. 141 feet (43 m)
- Dry Lake, 34°07′17″N 91°10′03″W, el. 131 feet (40 m)
- Eagle Nest Lake, 34°12′59″N 91°08′02″W, el. 141 feet (43 m)
- Escronges Lake, 34°13′08″N 91°04′57″W, el. 138 feet (42 m)
- Fish Lake, 34°09′54″N 91°07′25″W, el. 144 feet (44 m)
- Flag Lake, 34°07′43″N 91°25′09″W, el. 167 feet (51 m)
- Flat Lake, 34°13′03″N 91°03′56″W, el. 138 feet (42 m)
- Flat Lake, 34°02′21″N 91°13′00″W, el. 135 feet (41 m)
- Fraizer Lake, 34°19′50″N 91°07′01″W, el. 144 feet (44 m)
- Glenwood Lake, 34°24′34″N 91°40′12″W, el. 190 feet (58 m)
- Goose Lake, 34°06′01″N 91°09′52″W, el. 135 feet (41 m)
- Goosefoot Lake, 34°24′32″N 91°10′52″W, el. 154 feet (47 m)
- Gordon Lake, 34°25′15″N 91°09′43″W, el. 148 feet (45 m)
- Grand Cypress Lake, 34°15′18″N 91°37′18″W, el. 180 feet (55 m)
- Grassy Lake, 34°12′01″N 91°37′18″W, el. 135 feet (41 m)
- Gum Pond, 34°14′30″N 91°05′39″W, el. 144 feet (44 m)
- Gut Lake, 34°16′53″N 91°04′54″W, el. 141 feet (43 m)
- H Lake, 34°10′12″N 91°06′11″W, el. 138 feet (42 m)
- Hole in the Wall, 34°08′12″N 91°08′24″W, el. 138 feet (42 m)
- Holly Lake, 34°26′34″N 91°10′32″W, el. 151 feet (46 m)
- John Smith Lake, 33°57′58″N 91°09′26″W, el. 141 feet (43 m)
- La Grue Lake, 34°05′54″N 91°09′39″W, el. 138 feet (42 m)
- Laboring Bay, 34°02′25″N 91°12′07″W, el. 135 feet (41 m)
- Lake Dumond, 33°58′54″N 91°16′17″W, el. 148 feet (45 m)
- Leak Lake, 34°26′02″N 91°12′01″W, el. 154 feet (47 m)
- Lemmons Lake, 34°10′57″N 91°30′36″W, el. 171 feet (52 m)
- Little Goose Lake, 34°08′26″N 91°06′57″W, el. 138 feet (42 m)
- Little H Lake, 34°09′41″N 91°06′31″W, el. 138 feet (42 m)
- Little Horseshoe Lake, 34°18′01″N 91°04′49″W, el. 148 feet (45 m)
- Little Jones Lake, 34°17′08″N 91°06′07″W, el. 144 feet (44 m)
- Little Lake, 34°25′08″N 91°11′32″W, el. 151 feet (46 m)
- Little Pecan Lake, 34°10′43″N 91°25′01″W, el. 167 feet (51 m)
- Little Round Pond, 34°28′49″N 91°14′11″W, el. 151 feet (46 m)
- Little White Lake, 34°20′24″N 91°06′04″W, el. 144 feet (44 m)
- Long Lake, 34°09′41″N 91°05′37″W, el. 141 feet (43 m)
- Long Lake, 34°17′46″N 91°06′23″W, el. 151 feet (46 m)
- Long Lake, 34°25′07″N 91°10′23″W, el. 151 feet (46 m)
- Long Lake, 34°13′16″N 91°08′22″W, el. 138 feet (42 m)
- Lost Lake, 34°07′20″N 91°07′42″W, el. 141 feet (43 m)
- Lower Eagle Nest Lake, 34°07′52″N 91°09′03″W, el. 138 feet (42 m)
- Lower White Lake, 34°14′28″N 91°06′11″W, el. 141 feet (43 m)
- Luckett Lake, 34°33′04″N 91°18′01″W, el. 151 feet (46 m)
- Merrisach Lake, 34°02′31″N 91°16′23″W, el. 161 feet (49 m)
- Mobley Lake, 34°09′04″N 91°16′23″W, el. 138 feet (42 m)
- Moody Old River, 34°01′04″N 91°23′29″W, el. 157 feet (48 m)
- Moon Lakes, 34°11′21″N 91°09′00″W, el. 138 feet (42 m)
- Mopkins Lake, 34°15′30″N 91°13′1″W, el. 141 feet (43 m)
- Mud Lake, 34°15′47″N 91°05′46″W, el. 144 feet (44 m)
- Mud Lake, 34°19′59″N 91°04′41″W, el. 144 feet (44 m)
- Mud Lake, 34°08′58″N 91°09′26″W, el. 138 feet (42 m)
- Mud Lakes, 34°09′57″N 91°05′27″W, el. 141 feet (43 m)
- Old Old River, 34°00′59″N 91°22′13″W, el. 164 feet (50 m)
- Old River Lake, 33°57′05″N 91°09′25″W, el. 144 feet (44 m)
- Otter Lake, 34°15′49″N 91°05′20″W, el. 144 feet (44 m)
- Owens Lake, 33°58′41″N 91°10′01″W, el. 138 feet (42 m)
- Oxbow Lake, 34°06′52″N 91°08′01″W, el. 141 feet (43 m)
- Park Lake, 34°00′57″N 91°20′45″W, el. 171 feet (52 m)
- Polecat Lakes, 34°26′27″N 91°12′00″W, el. 154 feet (47 m)
- Poplar Creek Lake, 34°27′58″N 91°14′07″W, el. 151 feet (46 m)
- Prairie Lake, 34°10′16″N 91°06′43″W, el. 131 feet (40 m)
- Price's Lake, 34°19′06″N 91°06′23″W, el. 148 feet (45 m)
- Prosperous Bayou, 34°03′24″N 91°12′17″W, el. 135 feet (41 m)
- Round Lake, 34°09′02″N 91°07′20″W, el. 135 feet (41 m)
- Round Lake, 34°25′44″N 91°11′06″W, el. 154 feet (47 m)
- Star Lake, 34°14′00″N 91°04′38″W, el. 144 feet (44 m)
- T Lake, 34°09′10″N 91°06′51″W, el. 141 feet (43 m)
- Tupelo Lake, 34°25′28″N 91°10′39″W, el. 154 feet (47 m)
- Turner Lake, 34°16′03″N 91°04′59″W, el. 144 feet (44 m)
- Twin Lakes, 34°19′34″N 91°04′01″W, el. 151 feet (46 m)
- Twin Lakes, 34°10′26″N 91°07′50″W, el. 141 feet (43 m)
- Wheeler Lake, 34°08′16″N 91°26′55″W, el. 167 feet (51 m)
- White Lake, 34°05′35″N 91°09′32″W, el. 135 feet (41 m)
- Willow Lake, 34°19′26″N 91°05′53″W, el. 144 feet (44 m)
- Wolf Lake, 34°08′45″N 91°07′32″W, el. 135 feet (41 m)

== Reservoirs ==
- Abernathy Reservoir, 34°29′05″N 91°18′15″W, el. 190 feet (58 m)
- Alter Lake, 34°15′30″N 91°17′46″W, el. 190 feet (58 m)
- Alter Lake Number Two, 34°15′48″N 91°18′00″W, el. 177 feet (54 m)
- Arkansas Post Canal Reservoir, 34°01′06″N 91°11′18″W, el. 125 feet (38 m)
- Baker Brothers Reservoir, 34°31′02″N 91°28′37″W, el. 200 feet (61 m)
- Bennett Reservoir, 34°26′14″N 91°23′36″W, el. 190 feet (58 m)
- Botts Lake, 34°11′21″N 91°21′09″W, el. 184 feet (56 m)
- Bradberry Pond, 34°10′20″N 91°13′24″W, el. 144 feet (44 m)
- Brother Reservoir, 34°32′15″N 91°28′34″W, el. 200 feet (61 m)
- Butler Lake, 34°16′56″N 91°12′26″W, el. 177 feet (54 m)
- Butler Lake Number Two, 34°18′12″N 91°07′34″W, el. 164 feet (50 m)
- Chaney Lake, 34°10′33″N 91°24′20″W, el. 171 feet (52 m)
- Childers Lake Dam, 34°11′42″N 91°17′24″W, el. 167 feet (51 m)
- Cox Reservoir, 34°22′07″N 91°32′37″W, el. 190 feet (58 m)
- Daugherty Reservoir, 34°30′27″N 91°22′11″W, el. 200 feet (61 m)

== See also ==
- List of lakes in Arkansas
