= 1988 United States presidential election in Arkansas =

- November 8, 1988

Nominee	George H. W. Bush	Michael Dukakis
Party	Republican	Democratic
Home state	Texas	Massachusetts
Running mate	Dan Quayle	Lloyd Bentsen
Electoral vote	6	0
Popular vote	466,578	349,237
Percentage	56.37%	42.19%
County results
Bush
40–50%
50–60%
60–70%
70–80%
Dukakis
50–60%
60–70%
President before election
Ronald Reagan
Republican
Elected President
George H. W. Bush
Republican

The 1988 United States presidential election in Arkansas took place on November 8, 1988. All fifty states and the District of Columbia, were part of the 1988 United States presidential election. State voters chose six electors to the Electoral College, which selected the president and vice president.

Incumbent Vice President George H. W. Bush, running with U.S. Senator Dan Quayle, defeated Governor Michael Dukakis, running with U.S. Senator Lloyd Bentsen.

A historically Democratic state, Arkansas was the last in the Solid South to defect from the party (when it supported Richard Nixon in the 1972 presidential election). The state was also Democratic nominee Jimmy Carter's third-highest percentage performance in the 1976 presidential election. However, Ronald Reagan won the state in both 1980 and 1984

== Primary ==
Arkansas switched to a caucus system for the 1984 primary, which resulted in voter turnout in the Democratic primary from 450,000 in 1980, to 22,202 in 1984. The primary system was restored for the 1988 election.

U.S. Senator Dale Bumpers was speculated as a possible presidential candidate and U.S. Senator Paul Simon, who supported a proposed Bumpers candidacy, stated that Bumpers would "have more support in the United States Senate than any other candidate". However, Bumpers announced on March 20, 1987, that he would not seek the nomination. Governor Bill Clinton was also speculated as a candidate, but he announced that he would not run on July 15.

Arkansas was rarely visited during the primary by the major candidates with twenty visits from the Democratic candidates and nine from the Republican candidates. Republican primary turnout rose from 8,177 in 1980, to 19,040 in 1984, and to 68,305 in 1988. Half of the votes in the Republican primary came from within the 3rd congressional district.

Turnout in the Democratic primary was 497,506. Dick Gephardt won four counties along the border of his home state of Missouri while Jesse Jackson won ten counties with high black populations. Al Gore won 46% of the white vote. The racial composition of the primary was 87% white and 13% black, and 13% of white voters participated in the Republican primary.

Lottie Shackelford, the first black woman to serve as mayor of Little Rock, was one of the four chairs of the Democratic National Convention. Clinton gave the nomination speech for Dukakis at the convention.

U.S. Representative Tommy F. Robinson, a conservative boll weevil, was denied a position as a superdelegate to the DNC. He was elected as a delegate pledged to Gore. While other delegates pledged to Gore switched to Dukakis, Robinson switched his support to Jackson stating that his speech "had touched my soul". He was critical of Dukakis during the campaign stating that he should spend time in "states like Arkansas speaking words we can understand" in response to Dukakis speaking Spanish at events in Texas and California and refused to endorse Dukakis. Robinson later joined the Republican Party on July 28, 1989.

1988 Arkansas Democratic presidential primary
Candidate	Votes	%	Delegates
Al Gore	185,758	37.33%	
Michael Dukakis	94,103	18.91%	
Jesse Jackson	85,003	17.08%	
Dick Gephardt	59,711	12.00%	
Uncommitted	35,553	7.15%	
Gary Hart	18,630	3.74%	
Paul Simon	9,020	1.81%	
David Duke	4,805	0.97%	
Bruce Babbitt	2,614	0.53%	
Lyndon LaRouche	2,347	0.47%	
Total	497,544	100%	

1988 Arkansas Republican presidential primary
Candidate	Votes	%	Delegates
George H. W. Bush	32,114	47.02%	
Bob Dole	17,667	25.86%	
Pat Robertson	12,918	18.19%	
Jack Kemp	3,499	5.12%	
Uncommitted	1,402	2.05%	
Pete du Pont	359	0.53%	
Alexander Haig	346	0.51%	
Total	68,305	100%	

== Campaign ==
During the campaign Lloyd Bentsen visited six times, Dukakis visited three times, Dan Quayle visited twice, and Bush visited once. Ed Bethune, chair of the Republican Party of Arkansas, stated in October that recent polling showed the state as a tossup and later quoted Lee Atwater as saying "the state he has historically worried about was Arkansas".

Bush's victory in Arkansas was with a percentage lower than his average in the rest of the south. Turnout among the voting age population in Arkansas declined from 52.5% in 1984, to 44.2% in 1988. Among white voters, 63% supported Bush while 36% supported Dukakis. The Democrats maintained their control over the Arkansas General Assembly.

The vast majority of the counties voted primarily Republican, including the highly populated center of Pulaski County. As of the 2024 presidential election this stands as the last election in which Pulaski County and Crittenden County voted for a Republican presidential candidate.

=== Polling ===
Poll source	Date(s) administered	Sample size	Margin of error	George Bush Republican	Michael Dukakis Democratic	Other / Undecided
Mason-Dixon Research	October 10–11, 1988	826		47%	41%	12%
Center for Research & Public Policy	October 14–19, 1988	394		54%	32%	14%
Opinion Research Associates	October 24–26, 1988	452		48%	32%	20%
Mason-Dixon Research	October 26–28, 1988	809		49%	40%	10%

== General election ==
=== Predictions ===
Source	Rating	As of
The Cook Political Report	Toss Up	September 24, 1988

=== Results ===
1988 United States presidential election in Arkansas
Party	Candidate	Votes	%	±%
Republican	George H. W. Bush	466,578	56.37%	
Democratic	Michael Dukakis	349,237	42.19%	
Populist	David Duke	5,146	0.62%	
Libertarian	Ron Paul	3,297	0.40%	
New Alliance	Lenora Fulani	2,161	0.26%	
Prohibition	Earl Dodge	1,319	0.16%	
Total votes		827,738	100.00%	

=== Results by county ===
County	George H.W. Bush Republican		Michael Dukakis Democratic		Various candidates Other parties		Margin		Total votes cast
County	#	%	#	%	#	%	#	%	Total votes cast
Arkansas	4,007	55.61%	3,075	42.68%	123	1.71%	932	12.93%	7,205
Ashley	4,111	47.48%	4,466	51.58%	82	0.95%	-355	-4.10%	8,659
Baxter	8,614	63.35%	4,808	35.36%	175	1.29%	3,806	27.99%	13,597
Benton	24,295	71.23%	9,399	27.55%	416	1.22%	14,896	43.68%	34,110
Boone	7,567	64.04%	3,998	33.84%	251	2.12%	3,569	30.20%	11,816
Bradley	2,089	48.93%	2,167	50.76%	13	0.30%	-78	-1.83%	4,269
Calhoun	1,316	56.14%	1,024	43.69%	4	0.17%	292	12.45%	2,344
Carroll	4,553	62.77%	2,632	36.29%	68	0.94%	1,921	26.48%	7,253
Chicot	1,901	43.74%	2,426	55.82%	19	0.44%	-525	-12.08%	4,346
Clark	3,389	41.69%	4,675	57.50%	66	0.81%	-1,286	-15.81%	8,130
Clay	2,766	44.33%	3,442	55.16%	32	0.51%	-676	-10.83%	6,240
Cleburne	4,932	58.85%	3,404	40.62%	45	0.54%	1,528	18.23%	8,381
Cleveland	1,462	50.75%	1,404	48.73%	15	0.52%	58	2.02%	2,881
Columbia	5,810	59.27%	3,706	37.81%	286	2.92%	2,104	21.46%	9,802
Conway	4,066	49.35%	4,134	50.18%	39	0.47%	-68	-0.83%	8,239
Craighead	11,887	54.99%	9,083	42.02%	645	2.98%	2,804	12.97%	21,615
Crawford	9,092	70.85%	3,582	27.91%	158	1.23%	5,510	42.94%	12,832
Crittenden	7,441	51.73%	6,702	46.59%	241	1.68%	739	5.14%	14,384
Cross	3,186	51.29%	2,989	48.12%	37	0.60%	197	3.17%	6,212
Dallas	1,947	49.19%	1,990	50.28%	21	0.53%	-43	-1.09%	3,958
Desha	2,334	42.94%	2,859	52.60%	242	4.45%	-525	-9.66%	5,435
Drew	2,995	53.29%	2,578	45.87%	47	0.84%	417	7.42%	5,620
Faulkner	10,678	58.42%	7,302	39.95%	299	1.64%	3,376	18.47%	18,279
Franklin	3,588	58.93%	2,458	40.37%	43	0.71%	1,130	18.56%	6,089
Fulton	1,918	48.47%	2,018	51.00%	21	0.53%	-100	-2.53%	3,957
Garland	19,281	60.93%	11,406	36.05%	955	3.02%	7,875	24.88%	31,642
Grant	2,717	55.40%	2,142	43.68%	45	0.92%	575	11.72%	4,904
Greene	5,161	50.06%	5,065	49.13%	84	0.81%	96	0.93%	10,310
Hempstead	3,938	50.49%	3,841	49.25%	20	0.26%	97	1.24%	7,799
Hot Spring	4,181	44.46%	5,090	54.12%	134	1.42%	-909	-9.66%	9,405
Howard	2,510	57.87%	1,818	41.92%	9	0.21%	692	15.95%	4,337
Independence	6,637	59.22%	4,523	40.36%	48	0.43%	2,114	18.86%	11,208
Izard	2,824	51.19%	2,652	48.07%	41	0.74%	172	3.12%	5,517
Jackson	3,049	41.90%	4,199	57.71%	28	0.38%	-1,150	-15.81%	7,276
Jefferson	12,520	42.08%	16,664	56.01%	568	1.91%	-4,144	-13.93%	29,752
Johnson	4,046	58.29%	2,818	40.60%	77	1.11%	1,228	17.69%	6,941
Lafayette	1,860	48.95%	1,915	50.39%	25	0.66%	-55	-1.44%	3,800
Lawrence	3,205	49.91%	3,179	49.51%	37	0.58%	26	0.40%	6,421
Lee	1,863	38.72%	2,878	59.81%	71	1.48%	-1,015	-21.09%	4,812
Lincoln	1,557	41.04%	2,204	58.09%	33	0.87%	-647	-17.05%	3,794
Little River	2,347	45.85%	2,740	53.53%	32	0.63%	-393	-7.68%	5,119
Logan	2,203	62.87%	1,254	35.79%	47	1.34%	949	27.08%	3,504
Lonoke	7,215	59.68%	4,786	39.59%	89	0.74%	2,429	20.09%	12,090
Madison	3,067	58.72%	2,106	40.32%	50	0.96%	961	18.40%	5,223
Marion	2,993	57.80%	2,033	39.26%	152	2.94%	960	18.54%	5,178
Miller	7,110	56.30%	5,437	43.05%	82	0.65%	1,673	13.25%	12,629
Mississippi	7,841	52.67%	6,759	45.40%	288	1.93%	1,082	7.27%	14,888
Monroe	1,862	46.88%	2,052	51.66%	58	1.46%	-190	-4.78%	3,972
Montgomery	1,752	55.99%	1,362	43.53%	15	0.48%	390	12.46%	3,129
Nevada	1,714	49.55%	1,732	50.07%	13	0.38%	-18	-0.52%	3,459
Newton	2,504	62.00%	1,489	36.87%	46	1.14%	1,015	25.13%	4,039
Ouachita	6,297	52.29%	5,229	43.42%	517	4.29%	1,068	8.87%	12,043
Perry	1,627	52.01%	1,470	46.99%	31	0.99%	157	5.02%	3,128
Phillips	3,892	39.47%	5,580	56.59%	389	3.94%	-1,688	-17.12%	9,861
Pike	2,105	55.44%	1,681	44.27%	11	0.29%	424	11.17%	3,797
Poinsett	3,644	48.16%	3,873	51.19%	49	0.65%	-229	-3.03%	7,566
Polk	4,099	62.15%	2,390	36.24%	106	1.61%	1,709	25.91%	6,595
Pope	10,084	66.68%	4,941	32.67%	98	0.65%	5,143	34.01%	15,123
Prairie	1,947	53.25%	1,688	46.17%	21	0.57%	259	7.08%	3,656
Pulaski	70,562	54.98%	55,857	43.53%	1,914	1.49%	14,705	11.45%	128,333
Randolph	2,560	47.25%	2,781	51.33%	77	1.42%	-221	-4.08%	5,418
St. Francis	4,298	47.86%	4,656	51.85%	26	0.29%	-358	-3.99%	8,980
Saline	12,353	58.89%	8,436	40.22%	188	0.90%	3,917	18.67%	20,977
Scott	2,507	58.82%	1,707	40.05%	48	1.13%	800	18.77%	4,262
Searcy	2,743	66.21%	1,340	32.34%	60	1.45%	1,403	33.87%	4,143
Sebastian	24,426	70.94%	9,684	28.13%	322	0.94%	14,742	42.81%	34,432
Sevier	2,254	52.09%	2,037	47.08%	36	0.83%	217	5.01%	4,327
Sharp	3,623	54.79%	2,955	44.69%	34	0.51%	668	10.10%	6,612
Stone	2,186	55.17%	1,728	43.61%	48	1.21%	458	11.56%	3,962
Union	10,581	61.32%	5,931	34.37%	744	4.31%	4,650	26.95%	17,256
Van Buren	3,562	57.37%	2,607	41.99%	40	0.64%	955	15.38%	6,209
Washington	23,601	64.38%	12,557	34.25%	500	1.36%	11,044	30.13%	36,658
White	11,094	60.84%	6,957	38.15%	183	1.00%	4,137	22.69%	18,234
Woodruff	1,097	36.16%	1,924	63.41%	13	0.43%	-827	-27.25%	3,034
Yell	3,535	55.84%	2,763	43.64%	33	0.52%	772	12.20%	6,331
Totals	466,578	56.37%	349,237	42.19%	11,923	1.44%	117,341	14.18%	827,738

=== Results by congressional district ===
Bush carried all 4 congressional districts, including three held by Democrats.

District	Bush	Dukakis
1st	50.9%	47.9%
2nd	56.2%	42.6%
3rd	65.6%	33.3%
4th	51.7%	46.6%

== See also ==
- United States presidential elections in Arkansas

== Works cited ==
- Black, Earl; Black, Merle (1992). The Vital South: How Presidents Are Elected. Harvard University Press. ISBN 0674941306.
- Moreland, Laurence; Steed, Robert; Baker, Tod, eds. (1991). The 1988 Presidential Election in the South: Continuity Amidst Change in Southern Party Politics. Praeger Publishers. ISBN 0275931455.
- Arkansas Election Results 1988 (PDF). Secretary of State of Arkansas. 1988.
