= Bear Pond =

Bear Pond may refer to:

== Bodies of water ==
- Bear Pond (Arkansas), a lake in Arkansas County, Arkansas
- Bear Pond (Hancock County, Maine)
- Bear Pond (Beaver River, New York), in Herkimer County
- Bear Pond (Stillwater, New York), in Herkimer County
- A lake in Bayfield County, Wisconsin)
- Bear Pond (Kenora District), a lake in Ontario
- Bear Pond (Lennox and Addington County), a lake in Ontario

== Other uses ==
- Bear Pond (book), a 1990 book by Bruce Weber
- Bear Pond Mountains, a subrange of the Appalachian Mountains
