= 2012 United States presidential election in Arkansas =

- November 6, 2012
- Turnout: 66.65% ▲

Nominee	Mitt Romney	Barack Obama
Party	Republican	Democratic
Home state	Massachusetts	Illinois
Running mate	Paul Ryan	Joe Biden
Electoral vote	6	0
Popular vote	647,744	394,409
Percentage	60.57%	36.88%

Romney
40–50%
50–60%
60–70%
70–80%
Obama
40–50%
50–60%
60–70%
President before election
Barack Obama
Democratic
Elected President
Barack Obama
Democratic

The 2012 United States presidential election in Arkansas took place on November 6, 2012, as part of the 2012 General Election in which all 50 states plus the District of Columbia participated. Arkansas voters chose six electors to represent them in the Electoral College via a popular vote pitting incumbent Democratic President Barack Obama and his running mate, Vice President Joe Biden, against Republican challenger and former Massachusetts Governor Mitt Romney and his running mate, Congressman Paul Ryan.

Romney and Ryan carried Arkansas with 60.57% of the popular vote to Obama's and Biden's 36.88%, winning the state's six electoral votes. While Arkansas had been won by the Democrats as recently as 1996 by native son Bill Clinton, Obama proved to be a poor fit for the state, and his 23.69% margin of loss was the worst defeat for a Democratic presidential candidate in Arkansas since 1972's margin of 38.1%. Obama also was defeated by a larger margin in Arkansas than Walter Mondale in 1984.

As of the 2024 presidential election, this is the last election in which Woodruff County voted for the Democratic candidate. This is also the first election since 1984 where either nominee received 60% of the vote. Obama is the only Democrat to ever win two terms without carrying the state at least once.

== Primary elections ==
=== Democratic primary ===
2012 Arkansas Democratic presidential primary
- May 22, 2012

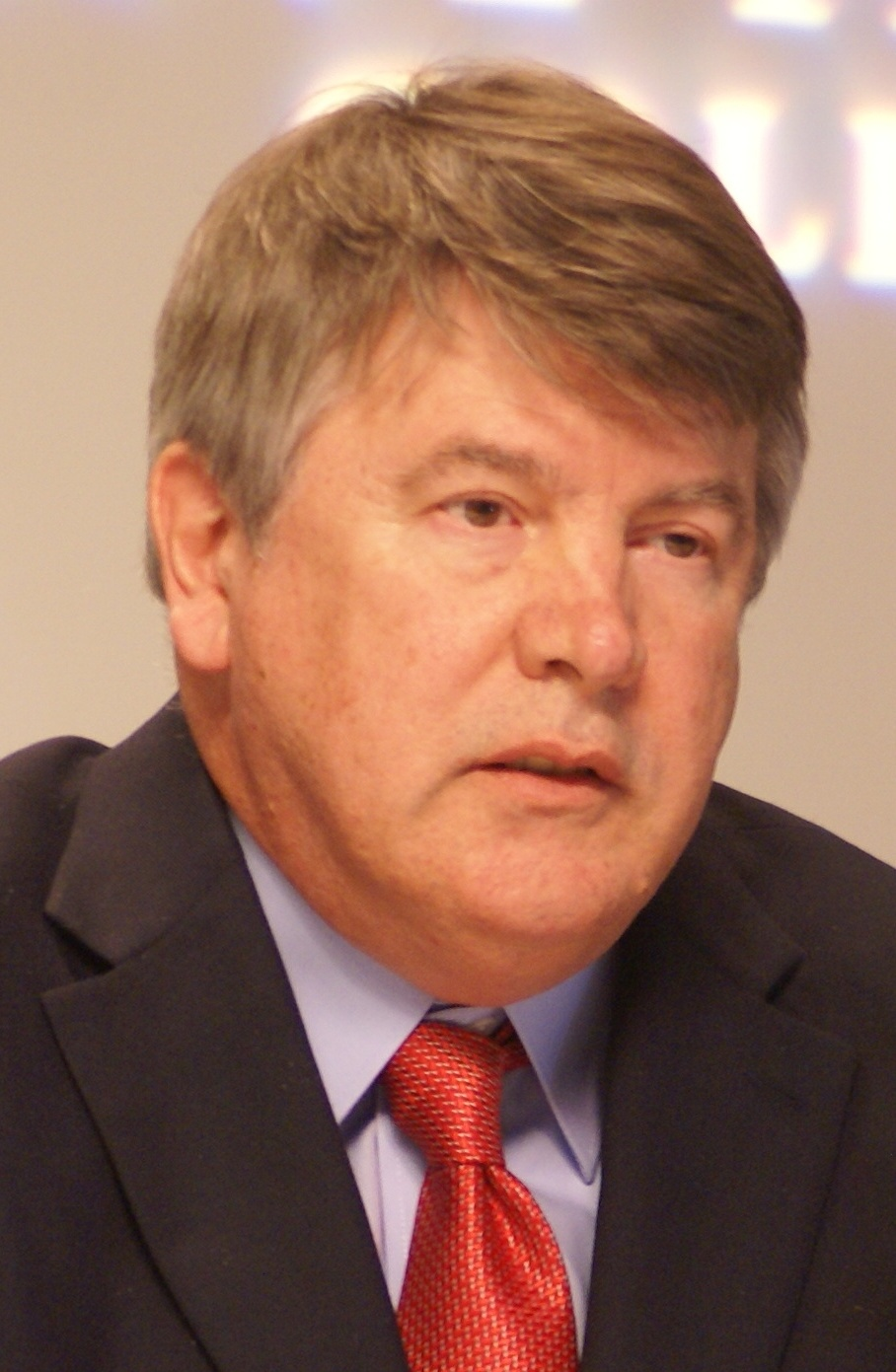
Candidate	Barack Obama	John Wolfe Jr.
Home state	Illinois	Tennessee
Delegate count	47	0
Popular vote	94,936	67,711
Percentage	58.37%	41.63%
- County results Obama: 50–60% 60–70% 70–80% 80–90% Wolfe: 50–60% 60–70% 70–80%

The Democratic primary had 47 delegates at stake. All 47 delegates were allocated to, and pledged to vote for Barack Obama at the 2012 Democratic National Convention. While John Wolfe Jr. qualified for 19 delegates to the convention by virtue of his performances in Arkansas, State party officials said Wolfe missed two paperwork filing deadlines related to the delegate process, therefore he was not eligible for any delegates. Wolfe commenced legal proceedings to have delegates in his name seated, but his case was dismissed before the convention. Eight other unpledged delegates, known as superdelegates, also attended the convention and cast their votes as well.

=== Republican primary ===
2012 Arkansas Republican presidential primary
- May 22, 2012

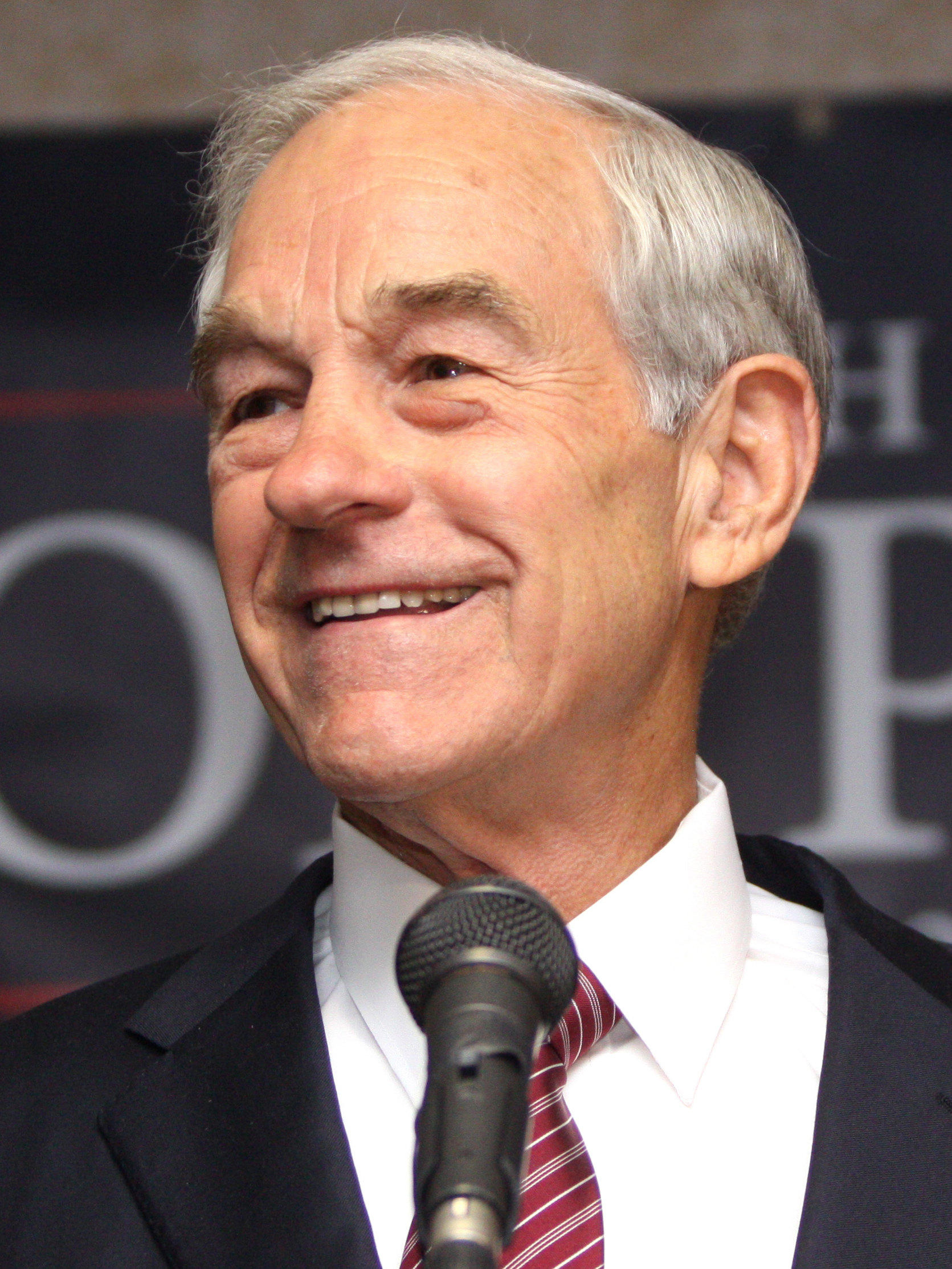

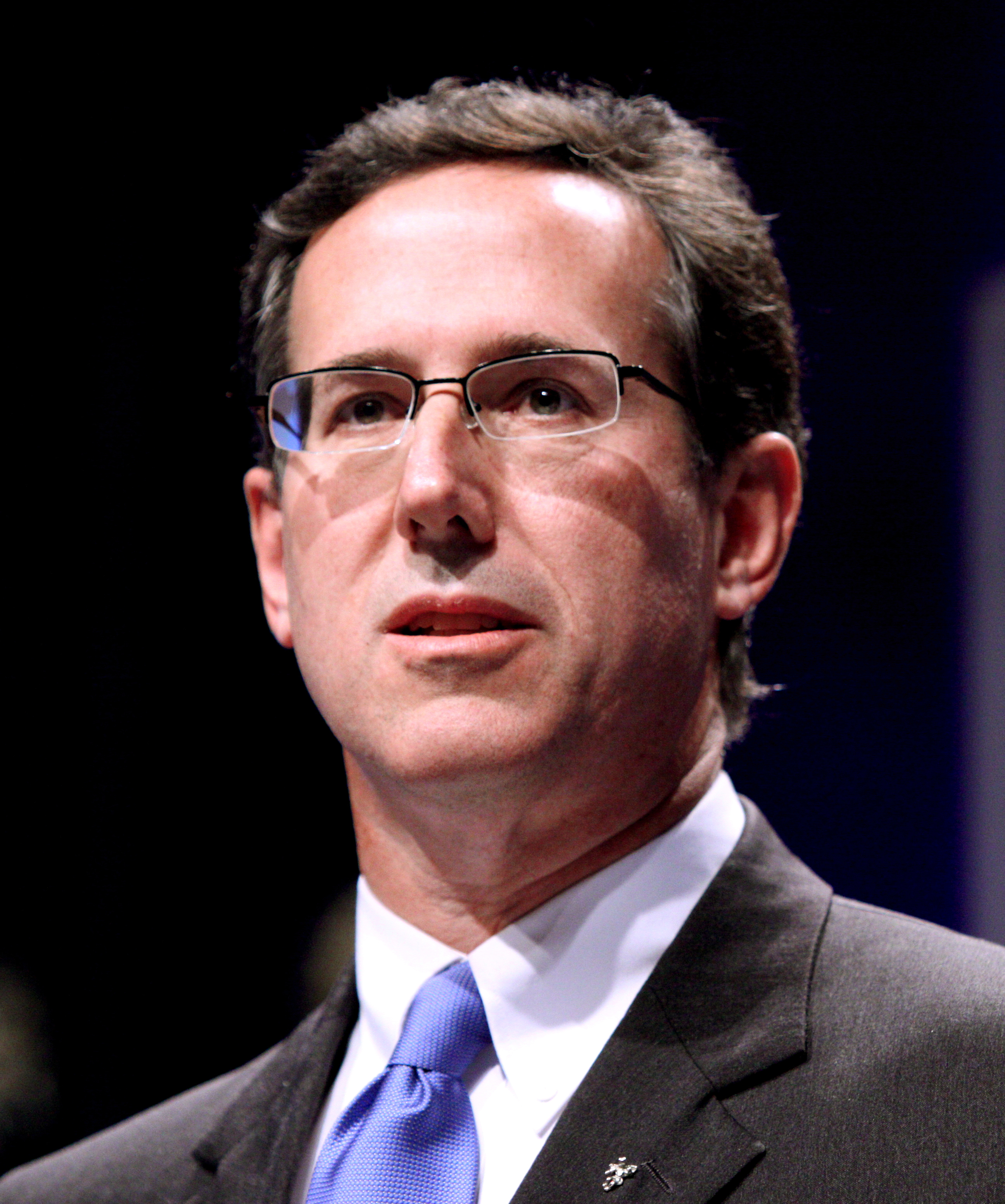

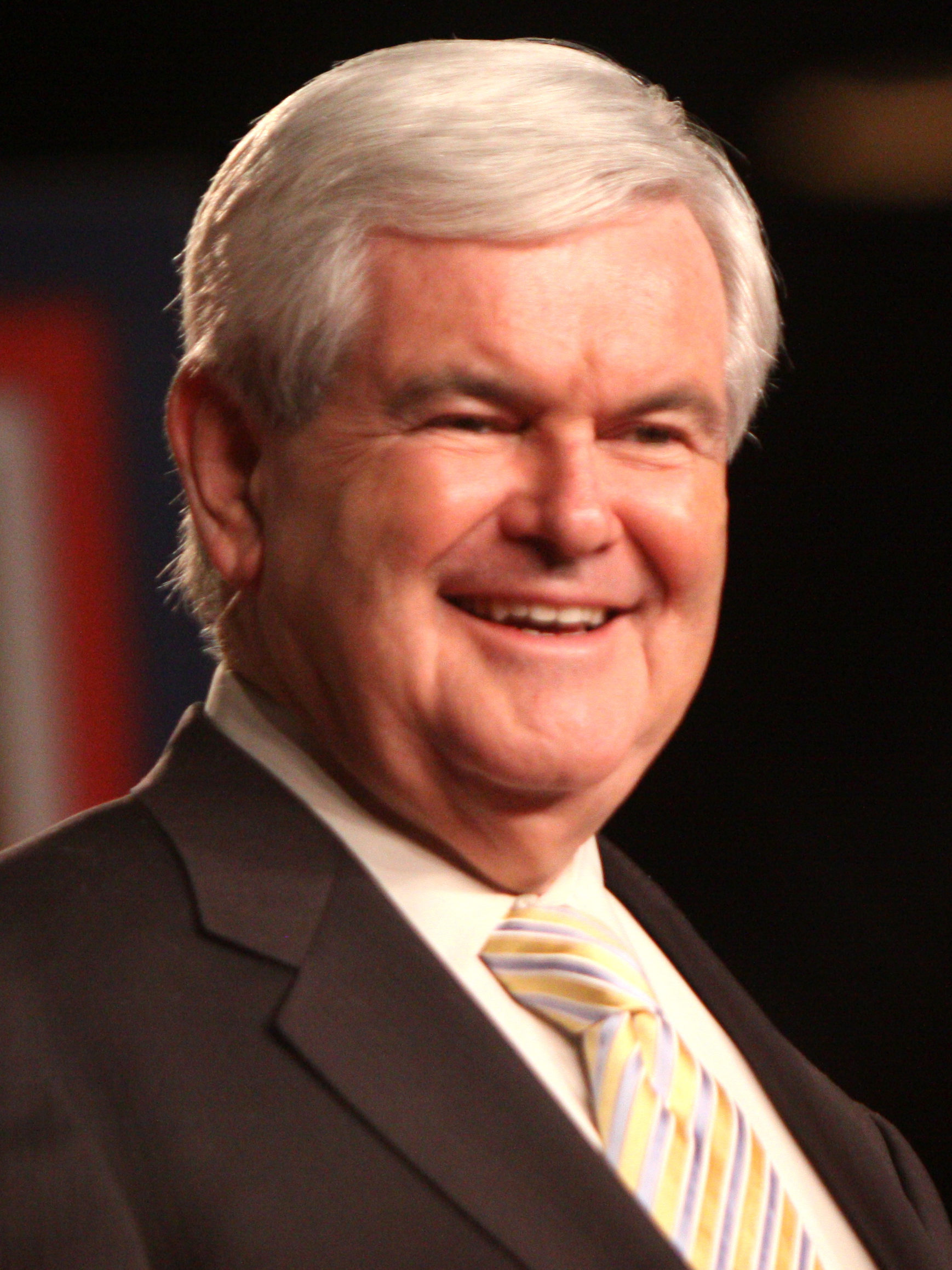
Candidate	Mitt Romney	Ron Paul
Home state	Massachusetts	Texas
Delegate count	33	0
Popular vote	104,200	20,399
Percentage	68.39%	13.39%
Candidate	Rick Santorum	Newt Gingrich
Home state	Pennsylvania	Georgia
Delegate count	0	0
Popular vote	20,308	7,453
Percentage	13.33%	4.89%
- County results Mitt Romney (Note: Italicization indicates a withdrawn candidacy)

The Republican primary had 33 delegates at stake. Mitt Romney won all 75 counties in Arkansas. As a result, all 33 delegates were allocated to, and pledged to vote for Mitt Romney at the 2012 Republican National Convention.

Rick Santorum and Newt Gingrich withdrew from the [presidential race on April 10 and May 2, 2012, respectively. Both endorsed Mitt Romney as the nominee.

Arkansas Republican primary, 2012
Candidate	Votes	Percentage	Delegates
Mitt Romney	104,200	68.39%	33
Ron Paul	20,399	13.39%	0
Rick Santorum	20,308	13.33%	0
Newt Gingrich	7,453	4.89%	0
Unpledged delegates:			3
Total:	152,360	100%	36

Key:	Withdrew prior to contest

Results by county (actual votes in parentheses):
County	Mitt Romney	Ron Paul	Rick Santorum (withdrawn)	Newt Gingrich (withdrawn)	County	Mitt Romney	Ron Paul	Rick Santorum (withdrawn)	Newt Gingrich (withdrawn)
Arkansas	68.86% (418)	12.69% (77)	11.53% (70)	6.92% (42)	Lee	48.00% (12)	4.00% (1)	36.00% (9)	12.00% (3)
Ashley	70.09% (232)	7.25% (24)	17.52% (58)	5.14% (17)	Lincoln	72.55% (37)	11.76% (6)	9.80% (5)	5.88% (3)
Baxter	73.04% (2338)	13.71% (439)	8.78% (281)	4.47% (143)	Little River	76.42% (162)	5.19% (11)	12.74% (27)	5.66% (12)
Benton	65.10% (14527)	14.69% (3278)	15.65% (3493)	4.56% (1018)	Logan	70.36% (869)	12.31% (152)	12.31% (152)	5.02% (62)
Boone	65.60% (1903)	15.41% (447)	13.89% (403)	5.10% (148)	Lonoke	65.51% (2758)	13.52% (569)	15.11% (636)	5.87% (247)
Bradley	73.66% (193)	8.02% (21)	12.60% (33)	5.73% (15)	Madison	66.34% (889)	15.82% (212)	14.18% (190)	3.66% (49)
Calhoun	63.11% (65)	13.59% (14)	19.42% (20)	3.88% (4)	Marion	69.93% (528)	13.38% (101)	12.05% (91)	4.64% (35)
Carroll	64.44% (1263)	15.87% (311)	13.67% (268)	6.02% (118)	Miller	73.82% (1824)	9.19% (227)	12.18% (301)	4.82% (119)
Chicot	79.07% (102)	6.20% (8)	6.20% (8)	8.53% (11)	Mississippi	76.47% (364)	9.45% (45)	9.45% (45)	4.62% (22)
Clark	65.55% (725)	13.74% (152)	13.47% (149)	7.23% (80)	Monroe	65.82% (52)	10.13% (8)	16.46% (13)	7.59% (6)
Clay	53.64% (59)	29.09% (32)	13.64% (15)	3.64% (4)	Montgomery	72.04% (456)	13.74% (87)	9.16% (58)	5.06% (32)
Cleburne	68.10% (2011)	11.65% (344)	13.48% (398)	6.77% (200)	Nevada	72.84% (59)	8.64% (7)	16.05% (13)	2.47% (2)
Cleveland	68.82% (287)	8.63% (36)	16.31% (68)	6.24% (26)	Newton	61.74% (276)	15.44% (69)	17.45% (78)	5.37% (24)
Columbia	71.67% (1472)	10.81% (222)	12.27% (252)	5.26% (108)	Ouachita	75.25% (830)	7.98% (88)	13.24% (146)	3.54% (39)
Conway	61.90% (442)	13.87% (99)	19.47% (139)	4.76% (34)	Perry	65.91% (292)	15.80% (70)	14.67% (65)	3.61% (16)
Craighead	70.92% (1678)	10.40% (246)	13.86% (328)	4.82% (114)	Phillips	68.63% (35)	15.69% (8)	1.96% (1)	13.73% (7)
Crawford	72.21% (3259)	10.26% (463)	13.27% (599)	4.25% (192)	Pike	65.05% (134)	15.53% (32)	14.56% (30)	4.85% (10)
Crittenden	72.18% (288)	9.27% (37)	10.03% (40)	8.52% (34)	Poinsett	64.44% (241)	11.76% (44)	16.04% (60)	7.75% (29)
Cross	75.10% (196)	6.51% (17)	12.26% (32)	6.13% (16)	Polk	68.32% (1085)	12.03% (191)	13.29% (211)	6.36% (101)
Dallas	70.87% (253)	11.20% (40)	13.45% (48)	4.48% (16)	Pope	69.59% (2751)	12.32% (487)	12.98% (513)	5.11% (202)
Desha	67.16% (45)	8.96% (6)	16.42% (11)	7.46% (5)	Prairie	60.94% (78)	22.66% (29)	13.28% (17)	3.13% (4)
Drew	72.56% (423)	7.55% (44)	14.24% (83)	5.66% (33)	Pulaski	71.27% (9758)	13.27% (1817)	11.52% (1578)	3.94% (539)
Faulkner	64.50% (5233)	15.83% (1284)	14.93% (1211)	4.75% (385)	Randolph	67.01% (197)	12.59% (37)	15.31% (45)	5.10% (15)
Franklin	71.32% (980)	9.24% (127)	13.46% (185)	5.97% (82)	Saline	66.50% (6782)	15.02% (1532)	13.93% (1421)	4.55% (464)
Fulton	66.55% (185)	14.75% (41)	9.71% (27)	8.99% (25)	Scott	70.31% (450)	11.25% (72)	13.59% (87)	4.84% (31)
Garland	72.83% (5829)	13.58% (1087)	8.47% (678)	5.12% (410)	Searcy	57.48% (857)	20.59% (307)	14.55% (217)	7.38% (110)
Grant	69.24% (493)	12.92% (92)	12.78% (91)	5.06% (36)	Sebastian	70.82% (6331)	12.09% (1081)	12.40% (1108)	4.69% (419)
Greene	65.83% (422)	10.45% (67)	17.32% (111)	6.40% (41)	Sevier	71.30% (164)	14.35% (33)	9.57% (22)	4.78% (11)
Hempstead	71.34% (478)	10.45% (70)	11.79% (79)	6.42% (43)	Sharp	62.50% (375)	16.17% (97)	15.83% (95)	5.50% (33)
Hot Spring	67.68% (693)	13.87% (142)	13.38% (137)	5.08% (52)	St. Francis	76.42% (94)	8.13% (10)	7.32% (9)	8.13% (10)
Howard	69.68% (193)	12.64% (35)	12.27% (34)	5.42% (15)	Stone	69.94% (342)	12.47% (61)	12.47% (61)	5.11% (25)
Independence	68.37% (536)	13.14% (103)	14.16% (111)	4.34% (34)	Union	73.34% (1642)	11.39% (255)	10.50% (235)	4.78% (107)
Izard	70.97% (357)	16.90% (85)	8.15% (41)	3.98% (20)	Van Buren	71.37% (653)	11.58% (106)	11.37% (104)	5.68% (52)
Jackson	64.55% (122)	8.99% (17)	20.63% (39)	5.82% (11)	Washington	68.11% (8504)	14.93% (1864)	12.92% (1613)	4.04% (505)
Jefferson	70.52% (1220)	9.71% (168)	13.99% (242)	5.78% (100)	White	65.47% (3638)	12.13% (674)	16.63% (924)	5.78% (321)
Johnson	65.81% (512)	13.88% (108)	13.24% (103)	7.07% (55)	Woodruff	57.89% (11)	10.53% (2)	21.05% (4)	10.53% (2)
Lafayette	71.82% (288)	9.98% (40)	14.71% (59)	3.49% (14)	Yell	68.72% (681)	13.22% (131)	12.21% (121)	5.85% (58)
Lawrence	66.09% (269)	13.02% (53)	14.50% (59)	6.39% (26)					

== General election ==
=== Predictions ===
Source	Ranking	As of
Huffington Post	Safe R	November 6, 2012
CNN	Safe R	November 6, 2012
The New York Times	Safe R	November 6, 2012
The Washington Post	Safe R	November 6, 2012
RealClearPolitics	Solid R	November 6, 2012
Sabato's Crystal Ball	Solid R	November 5, 2012
FiveThirtyEight	Solid R	November 6, 2012

=== Candidate ballot access ===
- Mitt Romney/Paul Ryan, Republican
- Barack Obama/Joseph Biden, Democratic
- Gary Johnson/James P. Gray, Libertarian
- Jill Stein/Cheri Honkala, Green
- Peta Lindsay/Yari Osorio, Socialism and Liberation

=== Results ===
2012 United States presidential election in Arkansas
Party	Candidate	Running mate	Votes	Percentage	Electoral votes
Republican	Mitt Romney	Paul Ryan	647,744	60.57%	6
Democratic	Barack Obama (incumbent)	Joe Biden (incumbent)	394,409	36.88%	0
Libertarian	Gary Johnson	Jim Gray	16,276	1.52%	0
Green	Jill Stein	Cheri Honkala	9,305	0.87%	0
Socialism and Liberation	Peta Lindsay	Yari Osorio	1,734	0.16%	0
Totals			1,069,468	100.00%	6

==== By county ====
County	Mitt Romney Republican		Barack Obama Democratic		Various candidates Other parties		Margin		Total
County	#	%	#	%	#	%	#	%	Total
Arkansas	3,897	60.01%	2,455	37.80%	142	2.19%	1,442	22.21%	6,494
Ashley	4,867	61.44%	2,859	36.09%	195	2.46%	2,008	25.35%	7,921
Baxter	13,688	70.78%	5,172	26.74%	479	2.48%	8,516	44.04%	19,339
Benton	54,646	68.95%	22,636	28.56%	1,975	2.49%	32,010	40.39%	79,257
Boone	11,159	72.50%	3,772	24.51%	460	2.99%	7,387	48.00%	15,391
Bradley	2,134	58.43%	1,449	39.68%	69	1.89%	685	18.76%	3,652
Calhoun	1,458	67.07%	660	30.36%	56	2.58%	798	36.71%	2,174
Carroll	6,125	60.15%	3,696	36.30%	362	3.55%	2,429	23.85%	10,183
Chicot	1,670	38.29%	2,649	60.74%	42	0.96%	-979	-22.45%	4,361
Clark	4,343	51.65%	3,811	45.32%	255	3.03%	532	6.33%	8,409
Clay	3,225	63.11%	1,738	34.01%	147	2.88%	1,487	29.10%	5,110
Cleburne	8,693	74.64%	2,620	22.50%	334	2.87%	6,073	52.14%	11,647
Cleveland	2,313	70.82%	845	25.87%	108	3.31%	1,468	44.95%	3,266
Columbia	5,790	61.24%	3,557	37.62%	108	1.14%	2,233	23.62%	9,455
Conway	4,514	58.40%	3,005	38.87%	211	2.73%	1,509	19.52%	7,730
Craighead	20,350	64.20%	10,527	33.21%	823	2.60%	9,823	30.99%	31,700
Crawford	15,145	73.55%	4,881	23.70%	565	2.74%	10,264	49.85%	20,591
Crittenden	6,998	41.86%	9,487	56.75%	231	1.38%	-2,489	-14.89%	16,716
Cross	4,269	63.90%	2,279	34.11%	133	1.99%	1,990	29.79%	6,681
Dallas	1,665	53.99%	1,337	43.35%	82	2.66%	328	10.64%	3,084
Desha	1,896	42.90%	2,443	55.27%	81	1.83%	-547	-12.38%	4,420
Drew	3,887	58.60%	2,630	39.65%	116	1.75%	1,257	18.95%	6,633
Faulkner	26,722	64.45%	13,621	32.85%	1,117	2.69%	13,101	31.60%	41,460
Franklin	4,631	70.81%	1,726	26.39%	183	2.80%	2,905	44.42%	6,540
Fulton	2,949	65.21%	1,452	32.11%	121	2.68%	1,497	33.10%	4,522
Garland	26,014	63.87%	13,804	33.89%	910	2.23%	12,210	29.98%	40,728
Grant	4,829	74.53%	1,468	22.66%	182	2.81%	3,361	51.88%	6,479
Greene	9,071	65.92%	4,000	29.07%	690	5.01%	5,071	36.85%	13,761
Hempstead	4,284	61.90%	2,468	35.66%	169	2.44%	1,816	26.24%	6,921
Hot Spring	7,097	63.03%	3,830	34.01%	333	2.96%	3,267	29.01%	11,260
Howard	2,892	64.81%	1,471	32.97%	99	2.22%	1,421	31.85%	4,462
Independence	8,728	70.40%	3,281	26.47%	388	3.13%	5,447	43.94%	12,397
Izard	3,575	67.73%	1,524	28.87%	179	3.39%	2,051	38.86%	5,278
Jackson	3,072	57.45%	2,095	39.18%	180	3.37%	977	18.27%	5,347
Jefferson	9,520	34.77%	17,470	63.80%	393	1.44%	-7,950	-29.03%	27,383
Johnson	5,064	62.53%	2,799	34.56%	235	2.90%	2,265	27.97%	8,098
Lafayette	1,713	58.48%	1,173	40.05%	43	1.47%	540	18.44%	2,929
Lawrence	3,536	63.83%	1,788	32.27%	216	3.90%	1,748	31.55%	5,540
Lee	1,280	37.38%	2,107	61.54%	37	1.08%	-827	-24.15%	3,424
Lincoln	2,199	59.02%	1,425	38.24%	102	2.74%	774	20.77%	3,726
Little River	3,385	67.02%	1,552	30.73%	114	2.26%	1,833	36.29%	5,051
Logan	5,079	69.28%	2,009	27.40%	243	3.31%	3,070	41.88%	7,331
Lonoke	17,880	74.15%	5,625	23.33%	609	2.53%	12,255	50.82%	24,114
Madison	4,263	64.91%	2,099	31.96%	206	3.14%	2,164	32.95%	6,568
Marion	4,774	67.71%	2,037	28.89%	240	3.40%	2,737	38.82%	7,051
Miller	10,622	69.29%	4,518	29.47%	189	1.23%	6,104	39.82%	15,329
Mississippi	6,603	49.37%	6,467	48.35%	305	2.28%	136	1.02%	13,375
Monroe	1,585	49.07%	1,583	49.01%	62	1.92%	2	0.06%	3,230
Montgomery	2,369	69.59%	920	27.03%	115	3.38%	1,449	42.57%	3,404
Nevada	1,996	58.98%	1,314	38.83%	74	2.19%	682	20.15%	3,384
Newton	2,508	68.51%	993	27.12%	160	4.37%	1,515	41.38%	3,661
Ouachita	5,521	53.52%	4,633	44.92%	161	1.56%	888	8.61%	10,315
Perry	2,581	65.54%	1,187	30.14%	170	4.32%	1,394	35.40%	3,938
Phillips	2,598	32.76%	5,202	65.60%	130	1.64%	-2,604	-32.84%	7,930
Pike	2,847	75.16%	851	22.47%	90	2.38%	1,996	52.69%	3,788
Poinsett	4,974	65.79%	2,390	31.61%	196	2.59%	2,584	34.18%	7,560
Polk	5,955	77.08%	1,556	20.14%	215	2.78%	4,399	56.94%	7,726
Pope	14,763	72.23%	5,126	25.08%	550	2.69%	9,637	47.15%	20,439
Prairie	2,153	68.55%	880	28.02%	108	3.44%	1,273	40.53%	3,141
Pulaski	68,984	43.28%	87,248	54.74%	3,149	1.98%	-18,264	-11.46%	159,381
Randolph	3,701	62.14%	2,046	34.35%	209	3.51%	1,655	27.79%	5,956
Saline	32,963	70.04%	12,869	27.34%	1,230	2.61%	20,094	42.70%	47,062
Scott	2,631	72.28%	897	24.64%	112	3.08%	1,734	47.64%	3,640
Searcy	2,699	73.06%	814	22.04%	181	4.90%	1,885	51.03%	3,694
Sebastian	29,169	67.27%	13,092	30.19%	1,101	2.54%	16,077	37.08%	43,362
Sevier	3,136	72.42%	1,042	24.06%	152	3.51%	2,094	48.36%	4,330
Sharp	4,921	67.57%	2,092	28.72%	270	3.71%	2,829	38.84%	7,283
St. Francis	3,368	40.28%	4,910	58.72%	84	1.00%	-1,542	-18.44%	8,362
Stone	3,776	70.53%	1,356	25.33%	222	4.15%	2,420	45.20%	5,354
Union	10,699	62.29%	6,196	36.07%	282	1.64%	4,503	26.22%	17,177
Van Buren	4,365	67.88%	1,832	28.49%	233	3.62%	2,533	39.39%	6,430
Washington	39,688	56.33%	28,236	40.07%	2,536	3.60%	11,452	16.25%	70,460
White	20,011	75.47%	5,765	21.74%	738	2.78%	14,246	53.73%	26,514
Woodruff	1,227	45.70%	1,340	49.91%	118	4.39%	-113	-4.21%	2,685
Yell	4,042	67.66%	1,722	28.82%	210	3.52%	2,320	38.83%	5,974
Totals	647,744	60.57%	394,409	36.88%	27,315	2.55%	253,335	23.69%	1,069,468

==== By congressional district ====
Romney won all four of the state's congressional districts.

District	Romney	Obama	Representative
1st	60.98%	36.33%	Rick Crawford
2nd	54.75%	42.9%	Tim Griffin
3rd	65.47%	31.6%	Steve Womack
4th	61.83%	35.88%	Tom Cotton

== See also ==
- United States presidential elections in Arkansas
- 2012 Democratic Party presidential primaries
- 2012 Republican Party presidential debates and forums
- 2012 Republican Party presidential primaries
- Results of the 2012 Republican Party presidential primaries
