= 1984 United States presidential election in Arkansas =

- November 6, 1984

Nominee	Ronald Reagan	Walter Mondale
Party	Republican	Democratic
Home state	California	Minnesota
Running mate	George H. W. Bush	Geraldine Ferraro
Electoral vote	6	0
Popular vote	534,774	338,646
Percentage	60.47%	38.29%
County results
Reagan
40–50%
50–60%
60–70%
70–80%
Mondale
40–50%
50–60%
President before election
Ronald Reagan
Republican
Elected President
Ronald Reagan
Republican

The 1984 United States presidential election in Arkansas took place on November 6, 1984. All fifty states and the District of Columbia, were part of the 1984 United States presidential election. State voters chose six electors to the Electoral College, which selected the president and vice president of the United States.

Arkansas was won by incumbent United States President Ronald Reagan of California, who was running against former Vice President Walter Mondale of Minnesota. Reagan ran for a second time with former C.I.A. Director George H. W. Bush of Texas, and Mondale ran with Representative Geraldine Ferraro of New York, the first major female candidate for the vice presidency.

Arkansas weighed in for this election as 2 percentage points more Republican than the national average. As of the 2024 presidential election, this is the last election in which St. Francis County voted for a Republican presidential candidate.

== Background ==
Arkansas was the last state to leave the Solid South when it supported Richard Nixon in the 1972 presidential election. Arkansas was Democratic nominee Jimmy Carter's third-highest percentage performance in the 1976 presidential election.

== Campaign ==
Arkansas switched to a caucus system for the 1984 primary, which resulted in voter turnout in the Democratic primary from 450,000 in 1980, to 22,202 in 1984. The primary system was restored for the 1988 election.

Reagan won the state and placed first in 65 of Arkansas' 75 counties and all four congressional districts. Among white voters, 68% supported Reagan while 31% supported Mondale.

== Results ==
1984 United States presidential election in Arkansas
Party	Candidate	Votes	Percentage	Electoral votes
Republican	Ronald Reagan (incumbent)	534,774	60.47%	6
Democratic	Walter Mondale	338,646	38.29%	0
Libertarian	David Bergland	2,221	0.25%	0
Independent Democrat	Lyndon LaRouche	1,890	0.21%	0
Communist Party	Gus Hall	1,499	0.17%	0
America First	Bob Richards	1,461	0.17%	0
New Alliance Party	Dennis Serrette	1,291	0.15%	0
Citizen's Party	Sonia Johnson	960	0.11%	0
Prohibition	Earl Dodge	842	0.10%	0
Independent	Arthur Lowery	822	0.09%	0
Totals		884,406	100.0%	6

=== Results by county ===
County	Ronald Reagan Republican		Walter Mondale Democratic		Various candidates Other parties		Margin		Total votes cast
County	#	%	#	%	#	%	#	%	Total votes cast
Arkansas	4,804	59.99%	3,153	39.37%	51	0.64%	1,651	20.62%	8,008
Ashley	5,675	62.44%	3,373	37.11%	41	0.45%	2,302	25.33%	9,089
Baxter	10,870	69.84%	4,528	29.09%	166	1.07%	6,342	40.75%	15,564
Benton	24,296	75.90%	7,306	22.82%	408	1.27%	16,990	53.08%	32,010
Boone	7,961	68.83%	3,356	29.01%	250	2.16%	4,605	39.82%	11,567
Bradley	2,690	53.62%	2,313	46.10%	14	0.28%	377	7.52%	5,017
Calhoun	1,474	58.15%	1,058	41.74%	3	0.12%	416	16.41%	2,535
Carroll	5,041	68.21%	2,263	30.62%	86	1.16%	2,778	37.59%	7,390
Chicot	2,502	42.21%	3,407	57.48%	18	0.30%	-905	-15.27%	5,927
Clark	4,185	47.27%	4,638	52.39%	30	0.34%	-453	-5.12%	8,853
Clay	3,767	53.02%	3,279	46.15%	59	0.83%	488	6.87%	7,105
Cleburne	5,769	64.04%	3,172	35.21%	67	0.74%	2,597	28.83%	9,008
Cleveland	1,773	56.02%	1,378	43.54%	14	0.44%	395	12.48%	3,165
Columbia	6,526	63.45%	3,680	35.78%	79	0.77%	2,846	27.67%	10,285
Conway	5,049	57.14%	3,742	42.35%	45	0.51%	1,307	14.79%	8,836
Craighead	14,047	62.87%	8,035	35.96%	261	1.17%	6,012	26.91%	22,343
Crawford	9,551	75.20%	3,071	24.18%	79	0.62%	6,480	51.02%	12,701
Crittenden	6,663	47.82%	6,520	46.79%	751	5.39%	143	1.03%	13,934
Cross	3,917	59.04%	2,701	40.71%	17	0.26%	1,216	18.33%	6,635
Dallas	2,361	52.80%	2,035	45.51%	76	1.70%	326	7.29%	4,472
Desha	2,696	45.87%	2,918	49.64%	264	4.49%	-222	-3.77%	5,878
Drew	3,407	56.10%	2,638	43.44%	28	0.46%	769	12.66%	6,073
Faulkner	11,595	60.89%	7,169	37.65%	279	1.47%	4,426	23.24%	19,043
Franklin	4,382	64.04%	2,399	35.06%	62	0.91%	1,983	28.98%	6,843
Fulton	2,329	55.15%	1,864	44.14%	30	0.71%	465	11.01%	4,223
Garland	21,213	62.47%	11,484	33.82%	1,261	3.71%	9,729	28.65%	33,958
Grant	3,167	59.16%	2,148	40.13%	38	0.71%	1,019	19.03%	5,353
Greene	6,179	56.17%	4,730	43.00%	91	0.83%	1,449	13.17%	11,000
Hempstead	4,904	59.31%	3,327	40.24%	37	0.45%	1,577	19.07%	8,268
Hot Spring	5,629	48.75%	5,836	50.55%	81	0.70%	-207	-1.80%	11,546
Howard	3,079	63.72%	1,746	36.13%	7	0.14%	1,333	27.59%	4,832
Independence	7,428	62.36%	4,415	37.07%	68	0.57%	3,013	25.29%	11,911
Izard	2,726	53.08%	2,346	45.68%	64	1.25%	380	7.40%	5,136
Jackson	3,901	48.88%	4,038	50.60%	42	0.53%	-137	-1.72%	7,981
Jefferson	14,514	44.10%	18,082	54.95%	313	0.95%	-3,568	-10.85%	32,909
Johnson	4,720	60.30%	3,056	39.04%	51	0.65%	1,664	21.26%	7,827
Lafayette	2,290	57.15%	1,695	42.30%	22	0.55%	595	14.85%	4,007
Lawrence	4,039	60.50%	2,594	38.86%	43	0.64%	1,445	21.64%	6,676
Lee	2,101	44.54%	2,541	53.87%	75	1.59%	-440	-9.33%	4,717
Lincoln	1,860	43.54%	2,406	56.32%	6	0.14%	-546	-12.78%	4,272
Little River	3,155	59.58%	2,090	39.47%	50	0.94%	1,065	20.11%	5,295
Logan	5,663	63.14%	3,206	35.75%	100	1.11%	2,457	27.39%	8,969
Lonoke	8,425	64.11%	4,636	35.28%	81	0.62%	3,789	28.83%	13,142
Madison	3,516	61.65%	2,133	37.40%	54	0.95%	1,383	24.25%	5,703
Marion	3,545	64.17%	1,945	35.21%	34	0.62%	1,600	28.96%	5,524
Miller	8,302	63.43%	4,686	35.80%	100	0.76%	3,616	27.63%	13,088
Mississippi	10,180	57.30%	7,548	42.49%	38	0.21%	2,632	14.81%	17,766
Monroe	2,508	50.45%	2,413	48.54%	50	1.01%	95	1.91%	4,971
Montgomery	2,221	59.12%	1,497	39.85%	39	1.04%	724	19.27%	3,757
Nevada	2,352	56.65%	1,783	42.94%	17	0.41%	569	13.71%	4,152
Newton	2,749	65.88%	1,414	33.88%	10	0.24%	1,335	32.00%	4,173
Ouachita	6,700	51.19%	5,858	44.76%	531	4.06%	842	6.43%	13,089
Perry	2,047	58.82%	1,404	40.34%	29	0.83%	643	18.48%	3,480
Phillips	4,686	43.70%	5,946	55.45%	91	0.85%	-1,260	-11.75%	10,723
Pike	2,665	64.72%	1,443	35.04%	10	0.24%	1,222	29.68%	4,118
Poinsett	5,622	58.64%	3,906	40.74%	59	0.62%	1,716	17.90%	9,587
Polk	5,181	70.15%	2,101	28.45%	104	1.41%	3,080	41.70%	7,386
Pope	10,667	67.28%	5,082	32.05%	106	0.67%	5,585	35.23%	15,855
Prairie	2,407	62.10%	1,437	37.07%	32	0.83%	970	25.03%	3,876
Pulaski	77,651	58.20%	54,237	40.65%	1,530	1.15%	23,414	17.55%	133,418
Randolph	3,188	55.61%	2,507	43.73%	38	0.66%	681	11.88%	5,733
St. Francis	5,378	52.10%	4,866	47.14%	78	0.76%	512	4.96%	10,322
Saline	11,709	60.68%	6,977	36.16%	611	3.17%	4,732	24.52%	19,297
Scott	3,066	65.11%	1,609	34.17%	34	0.72%	1,457	30.94%	4,709
Searcy	2,819	67.10%	1,313	31.25%	69	1.64%	1,506	35.85%	4,201
Sebastian	27,595	74.95%	8,688	23.60%	534	1.45%	18,907	51.35%	36,817
Sevier	3,302	62.64%	1,942	36.84%	27	0.51%	1,360	25.80%	5,271
Sharp	4,392	63.38%	2,492	35.96%	46	0.66%	1,900	27.42%	6,930
Stone	2,325	57.48%	1,654	40.89%	66	1.63%	671	16.59%	4,045
Union	12,333	65.74%	6,208	33.09%	218	1.16%	6,125	32.65%	18,759
Van Buren	4,060	60.97%	2,529	37.98%	70	1.05%	1,531	22.99%	6,659
Washington	24,993	68.10%	11,319	30.84%	386	1.05%	13,674	37.26%	36,698
White	12,566	64.66%	6,603	33.97%	266	1.37%	5,963	30.69%	19,435
Woodruff	1,675	44.56%	2,055	54.67%	29	0.77%	-380	-10.11%	3,759
Yell	4,051	59.56%	2,679	39.39%	72	1.06%	1,372	20.17%	6,802
Totals	534,774	60.47%	338,646	38.29%	10,986	1.24%	196,128	22.18%	884,406

==== Counties that flipped from Democratic to Republican ====
- Arkansas
- Ashley
- Bradley
- Calhoun
- Clay
- Cleveland
- Conway
- Cross
- Crittenden
- Dallas
- Faulkner
- Drew
- Grant
- Greene
- Hempstead
- Howard
- Independence
- Izard
- Johnson
- Lafayette
- Lawrence
- Little River
- Mississippi
- Monroe
- Montgomery
- Nevada
- Ouachita
- Perry
- Pike
- Poinsett
- Prairie
- Pulaski
- Randolph
- St. Francis
- Saline
- Scott
- Sevier
- Stone
- White
- Yell

== See also ==
- United States presidential elections in Arkansas
- Presidency of Ronald Reagan

== Works cited ==
- Black, Earl; Black, Merle (1992). The Vital South: How Presidents Are Elected. Harvard University Press. ISBN 0674941306.
- Moreland, Laurence; Steed, Robert; Baker, Tod, eds. (1991). The 1988 Presidential Election in the South: Continuity Amidst Change in Southern Party Politics. Praeger Publishers. ISBN 0275931455.
