= Pea Ridge =

Pea Ridge is the name of several places in the United States of America that include:

- Pea Ridge, Escambia County, Alabama
- Pea Ridge, Fayette County, Alabama
- Pea Ridge, Marion County, Alabama
- Pea Ridge, Shelby County, Alabama
- Pea Ridge, Arkansas, in Benton County
  - Battle of Pea Ridge, an American Civil War battle
  - Pea Ridge National Military Park
- Pea Ridge, Desha County, Arkansas
- Pea Ridge, Florida
- Pea Ridge, Maine
- Pea Ridge, Missouri
- Pea Ridge, North Carolina, in Washington County
- Pea Ridge, Polk County, North Carolina
- Pea Ridge, West Virginia
