= 1968 United States presidential election in Arkansas =

- November 5, 1968

Nominee	George Wallace	Richard Nixon	Hubert Humphrey
Party	American Independent	Republican	Democratic
Home state	Alabama	New York (Note: Although he was born in California and he served as a U.S. senator from California, in 1968 Richard Nixon’s official state of residence was New York, because he moved there to practice law after his defeat in the 1962 California gubernatorial election. During his first term as president, Nixon re-established his residency in California. Consequently, most reliable reference books list Nixon's home state as New York in the 1968 election and his home state as California in the 1972 (and 1960) election.)	Minnesota
Running mate	Curtis LeMay	Spiro Agnew	Edmund Muskie
Electoral vote	6	0	0
Popular vote	240,982	190,759	188,228
Percentage	38.87%	30.77%	30.36%
County results
Wallace
30–40%
40–50%
50–60%
70–80%
Nixon
30–40%
40–50%
50–60%
Humphrey
30–40%
40–50%
President before election
Lyndon B. Johnson
Democratic
Elected President
Richard Nixon
Republican

The 1968 United States presidential election in Arkansas was held on November 5, 1968 as part of the 1968 United States presidential election. American Independent candidate George Wallace won the state of Arkansas with 235,627 votes, with Republican Richard Nixon winning 189,062 and Democrat Hubert Humphrey winning 184,901.

With 38.87% of the popular vote, Arkansas would prove to be Wallace's weakest state that he carried in the 1968 election after Alabama, Mississippi, Louisiana and Georgia. This was the first time since 1872 that Arkansas did not vote for the Democratic candidate, and would be the last time until 2008 that Arkansas did not back the winner of the presidential election. As of 2024, this remains the last time that a Republican has won the presidency without carrying Arkansas.

Among white voters, 46% supported Wallace, 36% supported Nixon, and 19% supported Humphrey.

== Results ==
1968 United States presidential election in Arkansas
Party	Candidate	Votes	Percentage	Electoral votes
American Independent	George Wallace	240,982	38.87%	6
Republican	Richard Nixon	190,759	30.77%	0
Democratic	Hubert Humphrey	188,228	30.36%	0
Totals		619,969	100.00%	6
Voter turnout (Voting age/Registered voters)				54%/73%

=== Results by county ===
County	George Wallace American Independent		Richard Nixon Republican		Hubert Humphrey Democratic		Margin		Total votes cast
County	#	%	#	%	#	%	#	%	Total votes cast
Arkansas	3,775	49.67%	1,806	23.76%	2,019	26.57%	1,756	23.10%	7,600
Ashley	4,401	55.67%	1,470	18.59%	2,035	25.74%	2,366	29.93%	7,906
Baxter	1,513	22.04%	3,401	49.53%	1,952	28.43%	-1,449	-21.10%	6,866
Benton	4,036	24.87%	8,104	49.94%	4,088	25.19%	-4,016	-24.75%	16,228
Boone	2,169	29.21%	3,349	45.10%	1,907	25.68%	-1,180	-15.89%	7,425
Bradley	2,546	52.99%	802	16.69%	1,457	30.32%	1,089	22.67%	4,805
Calhoun	1,215	55.48%	287	13.11%	688	31.42%	527	24.06%	2,190
Carroll	1,174	23.16%	2,596	51.22%	1,298	25.61%	-1,298	-25.61%	5,068
Chicot	2,187	38.73%	865	15.32%	2,595	45.95%	-408	-7.22%	5,647
Clark	2,776	38.82%	1,642	22.96%	2,733	38.22%	43	0.60%	7,151
Clay	2,285	35.94%	2,410	37.91%	1,663	26.16%	-125	-1.97%	6,358
Cleburne	1,657	39.83%	1,301	31.27%	1,202	28.89%	356	8.56%	4,160
Cleveland	1,751	70.89%	312	12.63%	407	16.48%	1,344	54.41%	2,470
Columbia	3,843	46.60%	1,916	23.24%	2,487	30.16%	1,356	16.44%	8,246
Conway	1,958	30.16%	1,973	30.40%	2,560	39.44%	-587	-9.04%	6,491
Craighead	6,742	43.42%	5,047	32.50%	3,738	24.07%	1,695	10.92%	15,527
Crawford	2,917	40.41%	2,723	37.73%	1,578	21.86%	194	2.68%	7,218
Crittenden	4,657	43.99%	2,454	23.18%	3,475	32.83%	1,182	11.16%	10,586
Cross	3,056	53.58%	1,093	19.16%	1,555	27.26%	1,501	26.32%	5,704
Dallas	1,722	47.22%	672	18.43%	1,253	34.36%	469	12.86%	3,647
Desha	2,474	43.28%	972	17.00%	2,270	39.71%	204	3.57%	5,716
Drew	2,307	49.39%	1,040	22.27%	1,324	28.35%	983	21.04%	4,671
Faulkner	4,375	40.06%	2,791	25.55%	3,756	34.39%	619	5.67%	10,922
Franklin	2,111	45.96%	1,333	29.02%	1,149	25.02%	778	16.94%	4,593
Fulton	1,080	32.76%	1,198	36.34%	1,019	30.91%	-118	-3.58%	3,297
Garland	6,955	34.29%	7,674	37.83%	5,655	27.88%	-719	-3.54%	20,284
Grant	2,194	59.73%	627	17.07%	852	23.20%	1,342	36.53%	3,673
Greene	3,021	37.40%	2,859	35.40%	2,197	27.20%	162	2.00%	8,077
Hempstead	3,136	43.31%	1,783	24.62%	2,322	32.07%	814	11.24%	7,241
Hot Spring	4,139	51.38%	1,780	22.10%	2,137	26.53%	2,002	24.85%	8,056
Howard	1,660	41.43%	1,286	32.09%	1,061	26.48%	374	9.34%	4,007
Independence	2,770	35.33%	2,782	35.48%	2,289	29.19%	-12	-0.15%	7,841
Izard	1,109	37.12%	931	31.16%	948	31.73%	161	5.39%	2,988
Jackson	3,525	50.85%	1,356	19.56%	2,051	29.59%	1,474	21.26%	6,932
Jefferson	10,053	41.82%	4,860	20.22%	9,125	37.96%	928	3.86%	24,038
Johnson	1,693	33.15%	1,667	32.64%	1,747	34.21%	-54	-1.06%	5,107
Lafayette	1,704	47.54%	672	18.75%	1,208	33.71%	496	13.83%	3,584
Lawrence	2,813	45.27%	1,788	28.77%	1,613	25.96%	1,025	16.50%	6,214
Lee	1,907	39.11%	834	17.10%	2,135	43.79%	-228	-4.68%	4,876
Lincoln	2,084	55.12%	488	12.91%	1,209	31.98%	875	23.14%	3,781
Little River	1,473	44.50%	745	22.51%	1,092	32.99%	381	11.51%	3,310
Logan	2,160	33.24%	2,341	36.02%	1,998	30.74%	-181	-2.78%	6,499
Lonoke	4,002	52.02%	1,677	21.80%	2,014	26.18%	1,988	25.84%	7,693
Madison	1,028	20.89%	2,320	47.14%	1,574	31.98%	-746	-15.16%	4,922
Marion	877	26.97%	1,385	42.59%	990	30.44%	-395	-12.15%	3,252
Miller	5,062	47.52%	2,662	24.99%	2,929	27.49%	2,133	20.03%	10,653
Mississippi	6,147	39.64%	4,369	28.17%	4,993	32.19%	1,154	7.45%	15,509
Monroe	2,406	48.19%	804	16.10%	1,783	35.71%	623	12.48%	4,993
Montgomery	992	39.27%	885	35.04%	649	25.69%	107	4.23%	2,526
Nevada	1,773	45.22%	840	21.42%	1,308	33.36%	465	11.86%	3,921
Newton	567	19.65%	1,467	50.83%	852	29.52%	-615	-21.31%	2,886
Ouachita	5,031	42.48%	2,209	18.65%	4,603	38.87%	428	3.61%	11,843
Perry	916	40.00%	740	32.31%	634	27.69%	176	7.69%	2,290
Phillips	4,279	37.30%	2,154	18.78%	5,039	43.92%	-760	-6.62%	11,472
Pike	1,535	46.59%	1,104	33.51%	656	19.91%	431	13.08%	3,295
Poinsett	4,074	51.66%	2,140	27.14%	1,672	21.20%	1,934	24.52%	7,886
Polk	1,812	34.87%	2,094	40.30%	1,290	24.83%	-282	-5.43%	5,196
Pope	2,769	31.95%	3,319	38.30%	2,578	29.75%	-550	-6.35%	8,666
Prairie	2,014	56.23%	693	19.35%	875	24.43%	1,139	31.80%	3,582
Pulaski	25,844	32.24%	26,709	33.32%	27,597	34.43%	-888	-1.11%	80,150
Randolph	1,610	38.21%	1,237	29.35%	1,367	32.44%	243	5.77%	4,214
St. Francis	4,254	46.51%	1,608	17.58%	3,284	35.91%	970	10.60%	9,146
Saline	5,569	49.31%	2,614	23.15%	3,111	27.55%	2,458	21.76%	11,294
Scott	1,238	36.41%	1,162	34.18%	1,000	29.41%	76	2.23%	3,400
Searcy	726	21.61%	1,909	56.83%	724	21.55%	-1,183	-35.22%	3,359
Sebastian	8,649	31.98%	12,073	44.65%	6,320	23.37%	-3,424	-12.67%	27,042
Sevier	1,501	39.02%	1,217	31.64%	1,129	29.35%	284	7.38%	3,847
Sharp	1,299	37.54%	1,136	32.83%	1,025	29.62%	163	4.71%	3,460
Stone	979	36.75%	987	37.05%	698	26.20%	-8	-0.30%	2,664
Union	7,853	45.66%	4,919	28.60%	4,426	25.74%	2,934	17.06%	17,198
Van Buren	1,224	33.10%	1,325	35.83%	1,149	31.07%	-101	-2.73%	3,698
Washington	5,092	23.29%	10,640	48.67%	6,131	28.04%	-4,509	-20.63%	21,863
White	5,054	41.63%	3,887	32.02%	3,198	26.34%	1,167	9.61%	12,139
Woodruff	1,734	47.78%	625	17.22%	1,270	35.00%	464	12.78%	3,629
Yell	1,949	36.91%	1,819	34.44%	1,513	28.65%	130	2.47%	5,281
Totals	235,627	38.65%	189,062	31.01%	184,901	30.33%	46,565	7.64%	609,590

==== Counties that flipped from Democratic to Republican ====
- Baxter
- Boone
- Clay
- Fulton
- Garland
- Independence
- Logan
- Madison
- Marion
- Newton
- Polk
- Pope
- Stone
- Van Buren
- Washington

==== Counties that flipped from Democratic to American Independent ====
- Bradley
- Calhoun
- Clark
- Cleburne
- Cleveland
- Craighead
- Crawford
- Cross
- Crittenden
- Dallas
- Desha
- Faulkner
- Franklin
- Grant
- Greene
- Hempstead
- Hot Spring
- Izard
- Jackson
- Jefferson
- Lafayette
- Lawrence
- Lincoln
- Little River
- Lonoke
- Mississippi
- Monroe
- Miller
- Montgomery
- Nevada
- Ouachita
- Perry
- Pike
- Poinsett
- Prairie
- Randolph
- St. Francis
- Saline
- Scott
- Sevier
- Sharp
- White
- Yell
- Woodruff

==== Counties that flipped from Republican to American Independent ====
- Arkansas
- Ashley
- Columbia
- Drew
- Howard
- Union

== See also ==
- United States presidential elections in Arkansas

== Works cited ==
- Black, Earl; Black, Merle (1992). The Vital South: How Presidents Are Elected. Harvard University Press. ISBN 0674941306.
