= Mud Lake (Arkansas) =

There are several lakes named Mud Lake within the U.S. state of Arkansas.

- Mud Lake, Arkansas County, Arkansas. 34°08′57″N 91°09′23″W
- Mud Lake, Arkansas County, Arkansas. 34°15′47″N 91°05′46″W
- Mud Lake, Arkansas County, Arkansas. 34°19′58″N 91°04′43″W
- Mud Lake, Ashley County, Arkansas. 33°15′25″N 92°02′31″W
- Mud Lake, Calhoun County, Arkansas. 33°20′41″N 92°31′21″W
- Mud Lake, Chicot County, Arkansas. 33°25′53″N 91°09′33″W
- Mud Lake, Desha County, Arkansas. 33°58′40″N 91°24′46″W
- Mud Lake, Hempstead County, Arkansas. 33°36′21″N 93°47′51″W
- Mud Lake, Jefferson County, Arkansas. 34°07′44″N 91°34′45″W
- Mud Lake, Lincoln County, Arkansas. 34°01′35″N 91°27′03″W
- Mud Lake, Monroe County, Arkansas. 34°33′37″N 91°14′57″W
- Mud Lake, Monroe County, Arkansas. 34°36′51″N 91°18′41″W
- Mud Lake, St. Francis County, Arkansas. 34°55′46″N 90°31′43″W
- Mud Lake, Union County, Arkansas. 33°14′02″N 92°13′39″W
- Mud Lake, Woodruff County, Arkansas. 35°10′03″N 91°25′38″W
