= Benjamin Desha =

American politician

Benjamin Desha was an American soldier and politician. He was a veteran of the War of 1812, and was wounded in the Battle of Mackinac Island. In 1822, Desha was appointed a receiver of public moneys by President James Monroe for the Arkansas Territory and moved there from Kentucky. He died on November 21, 1835.

Benjamin Desha is the namesake of Desha County, Arkansas.
