= Reed, Arkansas =

- Town
- Location of Reed in Desha County, Arkansas
- Coordinates: 33°42′06″N 91°26′45″W
- Country: United States
- State: Arkansas
- County: Desha

Area
  - Total: 0.20 sq mi (0.53 km^{2})
  - Land: 0.20 sq mi (0.53 km^{2})
  - Water: 0 sq mi (0.00 km^{2})
- Elevation: 151 ft (46 m)

Population (2020)
  - Total: 130
  - Estimate (2025): 113 ▼
  - Density: 641/sq mi (247.5/km^{2})
- Time zone: UTC-6 (Central (CST))
  - Summer (DST): UTC-5 (CDT)
- FIPS code: 05-58880
- GNIS feature ID: 2407192

Reed is a town in Desha County, Arkansas, United States. As of the 2020 census, Reed had a population of 130.

== Geography ==
According to the United States Census Bureau, the town has a total area of 0.1 square miles (0.26 km^{2}), all land.

== Demographics ==
Historical population
Census	Pop.	Note	%±
1970	403		—
1980	395		−2.0%
1990	355		−10.1%
2000	275		−22.5%
2010	141		−48.7%
2020	130		−7.8%
2025 (est.)	113	▼	−13.1%
U.S. Decennial Census

=== 2020 Census ===
Reed city, Arkansas – racial and ethnic composition Note: the US Census treats Hispanic/Latino as an ethnic category. This table excludes Latinos from the racial categories and assigns them to a separate category. Hispanics/Latinos may be of any race.
Race / ethnicity (NH = Non-Hispanic)	Pop 2000	Pop 2010	Pop 2020	% 2000	% 2010	% 2020
White alone (NH)	2	7	9	0.73%	4.96%	6.92%
Black or African American alone (NH)	264	125	118	96.00%	88.65%	90.77%
Native American or Alaska Native alone (NH)	1	0	0	0.36%	0.00%	0.00%
Asian alone (NH)	0	0	0	0.00%	0.00%	0.00%
Native Hawaiian or Pacific Islander alone (NH)	0	0	0	0.00%	0.00%	0.00%
Other race alone (NH)	0	0	0	0.00%	0.00%	0.00%
Mixed race or Multiracial (NH)	5	2	1	1.82%	1.42%	0.77%
Hispanic or Latino (any race)	3	7	2	1.09%	4.96%	1.54%
Total	275	141	130	100.00%	100.00%	100.00%

=== 2000 census ===
As of the census of 2000, there were 275 people, 95 households, and 72 families residing in the town. The population density was 2,668.5 inhabitants per square mile (1,030.3/km^{2}). There were 103 housing units at an average density of 999.5 per square mile (385.9/km^{2}). The racial makeup of the town was 0.73% White, 96.36% Black or African American, 0.36% Native American, 0.73% from other races, and 1.82% from two or more races. 1.09% of the population were Hispanic or Latino of any race.

There were 95 households, out of which 41.1% had children under the age of 18 living with them, 31.6% were married couples living together, 40.0% had a female householder with no husband present, and 23.2% were non-families. 21.1% of all households were made up of individuals, and 10.5% had someone living alone who was 65 years of age or older. The average household size was 2.89 and the average family size was 3.27.

In the town, the population was spread out, with 38.9% under the age of 18, 6.5% from 18 to 24, 22.9% from 25 to 44, 21.8% from 45 to 64, and 9.8% who were 65 years of age or older. The median age was 29 years. For every 100 females, there were 91.0 males. For every 100 females age 18 and over, there were 71.4 males.

The median income for a household in the town was $16,806, and the median income for a family was $18,333. Males had a median income of $27,813 versus $17,188 for females. The per capita income for the town was $8,727. About 29.5% of families and 40.5% of the population were below the poverty line, including 53.3% of those under the age of eighteen and 37.9% of those 65 or over.
