= Bear Pond (Stillwater, New York) =

Lake in Herkimer County, New York, United States

- Location of Bear Pond within New York
- Location: Herkimer County, New York
- Coordinates: 43°55′13″N 75°07′03″W
- Surface area: 8 acres (0.013 mi^{2}; 3.2 ha)
- Surface elevation: 1,716 feet (523 m)
- Settlements: Moshier Falls

Bear Pond is a small lake north-northeast of the hamlet of Moshier Falls in Herkimer County, New York. It drains south via an unnamed creek that flows into Beaver Lake.

== See also ==
- List of lakes in New York
