= Bear Pond (Arkansas) =

Lake in Arkansas

- Interactive map of Bear Pond
- Location: Arkansas County
- Coordinates: 33°58′24″N 91°09′07″W
- Type: pond
- Surface elevation: 138 feet (42 m)

Bear Pond is a small lake in Arkansas County, Arkansas. It is located in marsh lands, near the Desha County-Arkansas County line. It has one creek, which flows into the White River.
