= Big Horseshoe Lake (Arkansas) =

Lake

- Interactive map of Big Horseshoe Lake
- Location: 34°18′22″N 91°04′41″W
- Coordinates: 34°18′22″N 91°04′41″W
- Surface elevation: 144 feet (44 m)

Big Horseshoe Lake is a lake in Arkansas County, Arkansas.

The climate is temperate and subtropical. The average temperature is 16 °C (61 °F). The warmest month is August, at 25 °C (77 °F), and the coldest January, at 4 °C (39 °F). The average rainfall 1,423 millimetres (56.0 in) per year. The wettest month is March, with 155 millimetres (6.1 in) of rainfall, and the driest July, with 80 millimetres (3.1 in).
