= Big White Lake =

Lake

- Interactive map of Big White Lake
- Coordinates: 34°16′54″N 91°5′26″W

Big White Lake is a lake in Arkansas County, Arkansas.
