= Bark Shanty Lake =

Lake in Arkansas County, Arkansas

- Interactive map of Bark Shanty Lake
- Location: Arkansas County, Arkansas
- Coordinates: 34°26′02″N 91°10′34″W
- Type: Lake

Bark Shanty Lake is a small lake in Arkansas County, Arkansas. It sits 154 ft above sea level. It was named in 1981.
