= Beaver Lake (New York) =

Lake in New York, United States

- Location within New York Location within the United States
- Location: Lewis County, New York, United States
- Coordinates: 43°52′22.2449″N 75°9′29.1114″W
- Primary inflows: Beaver River, Sunday Creek, Beaver Meadow Brook
- Primary outflows: Beaver River
- Basin countries: United States
- Surface area: 238 acres (0.96 km^{2})
- Average depth: 8 feet (2.4 m)
- Max. depth: 30 feet (9.1 m)
- Shore length^{1}: 6.5 miles (10.5 km)
- Surface elevation: 1,427 feet (435 m)
- Islands: 2
- Settlements: Moshier Falls, New York
- ^{1} Shore length is not a well-defined measure.

Beaver Lake is located west of Moshier Falls, New York. Fish species present in the lake are pickerel, yellow perch, white sucker, and black bullhead. There is carry down trail access from the Reliant Energy/NYSDEC parking lot.
