= Prosperous Bayou =

- Interactive map of Prosperous Bayou
- Location: Arkansas County, Arkansas
- Coordinates: 34°03′24″N 91°12′17″W
- Type: lake

Prosperous Bayou is a small lake in Arkansas County, Arkansas.
