= Cooks Lake =

Lake in the state of Minnesota, United States

- Location within Minnesota
- Location: St. Louis County, Minnesota
- Coordinates: 47°0′32″N 92°16′7″W
- Type: lake
- Surface elevation: 1,371 feet (418 m)

Cooks Lake is a lake in St. Louis County, in the U.S. state of Minnesota located at an elevation of 1,371 feet (418 m).

Cooks Lake bears the name of an early settler.

== See also ==
- List of lakes in Minnesota
