= 1976 United States presidential election in Arkansas =

- November 2, 1976

Nominee	Jimmy Carter	Gerald Ford
Party	Democratic	Republican
Home state	Georgia	Michigan
Running mate	Walter Mondale	Bob Dole
Electoral vote	6	0
Popular vote	499,614	268,753
Percentage	64.94%	34.93%
County results
Carter
50–60%
60–70%
70–80%
80–90%
Ford
50–60%
President before election
Gerald Ford
Republican
Elected President
Jimmy Carter
Democratic

The 1976 United States presidential election in Arkansas took place on November 2, 1976, as part of the wider 1976 United States presidential election. State voters chose six electors to represent them in the Electoral College.

Arkansas overwhelmingly voted for the Democratic Party, former governor of Georgia Jimmy Carter and his running mate Minnesota U.S. Senator Walter Mondale with 64.94% of the vote. The Carter/Mondale ticket defeated Republican incumbent president Gerald Ford of Michigan and his running mate Kansas U.S. Senator Bob Dole in the state by a margin of 30.01%. Arkansas weighed in as nearly thirty percent more Democratic than the national average.

Among white voters, 58% supported Carter while 42% supported Ford.

As of the 2024 presidential election, this is the last election in which Searcy County and Crawford County voted for a Democratic presidential candidate.

== Results ==
1976 United States presidential election in Arkansas
Party	Candidate	Votes	Percentage	Electoral votes
Democratic	Jimmy Carter	499,614	64.94%	6
Republican	Gerald Ford (incumbent)	268,753	34.93%	0
Write-ins	Eugene McCarthy	647	0.08%	0
Write-ins	Thomas J. Anderson	382	0.05%	0
Totals		769,396	100.00%	6
Voter turnout (Voting age/Registered voters)				51%/75%

=== Results by county ===
County	Jimmy Carter Democratic		Gerald Ford Republican		Various candidates Write-ins		Margin		Total votes cast
County	#	%	#	%	#	%	#	%	Total votes cast
Arkansas	5,640	69.46%	2,480	30.54%			3,160	38.92%	8,120
Ashley	5,253	62.88%	3,092	37.01%	9	0.11%	2,161	25.87%	8,354
Baxter	5,766	49.49%	5,885	50.51%			-119	-1.02%	11,651
Benton	11,289	47.00%	12,670	52.75%	61	0.25%	-1,381	-5.75%	24,020
Boone	5,388	57.64%	3,959	42.36%			1,429	15.28%	9,347
Bradley	3,567	75.88%	1,134	24.12%			2,433	51.76%	4,701
Calhoun	2,014	80.11%	495	19.69%	5	0.20%	1,519	60.42%	2,514
Carroll	3,791	57.01%	2,804	42.17%	55	0.83%	987	14.84%	6,650
Chicot	3,868	70.39%	1,621	29.50%	6	0.11%	2,247	40.89%	5,495
Clark	6,641	78.32%	1,816	21.42%	22	0.26%	4,825	56.90%	8,479
Clay	5,664	74.95%	1,893	25.05%			3,771	49.90%	7,557
Cleburne	5,726	74.07%	1,992	25.77%	13	0.17%	3,734	48.30%	7,731
Cleveland	2,320	78.22%	646	21.78%			1,674	56.44%	2,966
Columbia	4,708	52.31%	4,287	47.63%	6	0.07%	421	4.68%	9,001
Conway	6,443	74.67%	2,177	25.23%	9	0.10%	4,266	49.44%	8,629
Craighead	13,840	69.02%	6,213	30.98%			7,627	38.04%	20,053
Crawford	5,946	55.52%	4,764	44.48%			1,182	11.04%	10,710
Crittenden	8,249	61.26%	5,202	38.63%	14	0.10%	3,047	22.63%	13,465
Cross	4,198	68.40%	1,909	31.11%	30	0.49%	2,289	37.29%	6,137
Dallas	3,266	76.20%	1,012	23.61%	8	0.19%	2,254	52.59%	4,286
Desha	4,228	75.50%	1,372	24.50%			2,856	51.00%	5,600
Drew	3,750	68.43%	1,730	31.57%			2,020	36.86%	5,480
Faulkner	11,423	74.45%	3,904	25.44%	16	0.10%	7,519	49.01%	15,343
Franklin	3,703	65.24%	1,973	34.76%			1,730	30.48%	5,676
Fulton	2,670	71.87%	1,038	27.94%	7	0.19%	1,632	43.93%	3,715
Garland	15,707	60.02%	10,394	39.72%	69	0.26%	5,313	20.30%	26,170
Grant	3,797	78.39%	1,047	21.61%			2,750	56.78%	4,844
Greene	7,495	73.54%	2,690	26.39%	7	0.07%	4,805	47.15%	10,192
Hempstead	5,397	65.37%	2,859	34.63%			2,538	30.74%	8,256
Hot Spring	7,809	78.12%	2,187	21.88%			5,622	56.24%	9,996
Howard	3,207	67.06%	1,575	32.94%			1,632	34.12%	4,782
Independence	7,116	71.17%	2,878	28.79%	4	0.04%	4,238	42.38%	9,998
Izard	3,328	70.48%	1,394	29.52%			1,934	40.96%	4,722
Jackson	6,456	78.36%	1,783	21.64%			4,673	56.72%	8,239
Jefferson	21,001	72.33%	8,034	27.67%			12,967	44.66%	29,035
Johnson	5,044	69.89%	2,173	30.11%			2,871	39.78%	7,217
Lafayette	2,342	61.49%	1,467	38.51%			875	22.98%	3,809
Lawrence	5,167	75.08%	1,708	24.82%	7	0.10%	3,459	50.26%	6,882
Lee	3,463	68.74%	1,574	31.24%	1	0.02%	1,889	37.50%	5,038
Lincoln	3,045	81.33%	699	18.67%			2,346	62.66%	3,744
Little River	3,142	68.71%	1,431	31.29%			1,711	37.42%	4,573
Logan	5,313	64.06%	2,909	35.07%	72	0.87%	2,404	28.99%	8,294
Lonoke	7,761	75.36%	2,522	24.49%	16	0.16%	5,239	50.87%	10,299
Madison	2,926	53.91%	2,502	46.09%			424	7.82%	5,428
Marion	2,979	59.30%	2,045	40.70%			934	18.60%	5,024
Miller	6,648	58.58%	4,679	41.23%	22	0.19%	1,969	17.35%	11,349
Mississippi	10,292	63.03%	6,009	36.80%	27	0.17%	4,283	26.23%	16,328
Monroe	3,556	73.35%	1,285	26.51%	7	0.14%	2,271	46.84%	4,848
Montgomery	2,420	72.37%	924	27.63%			1,496	44.74%	3,344
Nevada	3,101	72.64%	1,163	27.24%	5	0.12%	1,938	45.40%	4,269
Newton	1,840	53.32%	1,611	46.68%			229	6.64%	3,451
Ouachita	8,946	76.47%	2,753	23.53%			6,193	52.94%	11,699
Perry	2,310	73.52%	832	26.48%			1,478	47.04%	3,142
Phillips	7,774	69.93%	3,342	30.06%	1	0.01%	4,432	39.87%	11,117
Pike	2,822	69.40%	1,234	30.35%	10	0.25%	1,588	39.05%	4,066
Poinsett	6,835	71.45%	2,726	28.50%	5	0.05%	4,109	42.95%	9,566
Polk	3,505	58.75%	2,432	40.76%	29	0.49%	1,073	17.99%	5,966
Pope	8,355	65.62%	4,348	34.15%	29	0.23%	4,007	31.47%	12,732
Prairie	2,836	77.72%	813	22.28%			2,023	55.44%	3,649
Pulaski	63,541	62.62%	37,690	37.14%	244	0.24%	25,851	25.48%	101,475
Randolph	4,551	74.34%	1,571	25.66%			2,980	48.68%	6,122
St. Francis	6,851	65.12%	3,639	34.59%	30	0.29%	3,212	30.53%	10,520
Saline	12,008	74.41%	4,123	25.55%	7	0.04%	7,885	48.86%	16,138
Scott	2,880	66.79%	1,427	33.09%	5	0.12%	1,453	33.70%	4,312
Searcy	3,180	54.09%	2,699	45.91%			481	8.18%	5,879
Sebastian	15,768	47.11%	17,671	52.79%	34	0.10%	-1,903	-5.68%	33,473
Sevier	3,391	69.53%	1,468	30.10%	18	0.37%	1,923	39.43%	4,877
Sharp	3,532	62.15%	2,151	37.85%			1,381	24.30%	5,683
Stone	2,718	72.54%	1,014	27.06%	15	0.40%	1,704	45.48%	3,747
Union	8,257	51.03%	7,918	48.93%	7	0.04%	339	2.10%	16,182
Van Buren	4,004	71.14%	1,624	28.86%			2,380	42.28%	5,628
Washington	15,610	52.32%	14,132	47.37%	92	0.31%	1,478	4.95%	29,834
White	11,412	70.58%	4,756	29.42%			6,656	41.16%	16,168
Woodruff	3,040	78.09%	848	21.78%	5	0.13%	2,192	56.31%	3,893
Yell	5,785	74.96%	1,932	25.04%			3,853	49.92%	7,717
Totals	499,614	64.94%	268,753	34.93%	1,029	0.13%	230,861	30.01%	769,396

==== Counties that flipped from Republican to Democratic ====
- Boone
- Carroll
- Chicot
- Clark
- Cleburne
- Columbia
- Craighead
- Crawford
- Desha
- Hot Spring
- Franklin
- Garland
- Fulton
- Jackson
- Jefferson
- Logan
- Lonoke
- Lee
- Lincoln
- Phillips
- Madison
- Marion
- Miller
- Newton
- Polk
- Pope
- Searcy
- Sharp
- Union
- Van Buren
- Washington
- Woodruff
- Arkansas
- Ashley
- Bradley
- Calhoun
- Clay
- Cleveland
- Conway
- Cross
- Crittenden
- Dallas
- Faulkner
- Drew
- Grant
- Greene
- Hempstead
- Howard
- Independence
- Izard
- Johnson
- Lafayette
- Lawrence
- Little River
- Mississippi
- Monroe
- Montgomery
- Nevada
- Ouachita
- Perry
- Pike
- Poinsett
- Prairie
- Pulaski
- Randolph
- St. Francis
- Saline
- Scott
- Sevier
- Stone
- White
- Yell

=== By congressional district ===
Carter won all four congressional districts, including one that elected a Republican.

District	Carter	Ford	Representative
1st	69.7%	30.3%	William Vollie Alexander Jr.
2nd	67.7%	32.3%	Jim Guy Tucker
3rd	56.4%	43.6%	John Paul Hammerschmidt
4th	68.7%	31.3%	Ray Thornton

== See also ==
- United States presidential elections in Arkansas

== Works cited ==
- Black, Earl; Black, Merle (1992). The Vital South: How Presidents Are Elected. Harvard University Press. ISBN 0674941306.
