= Pea Ridge, Desha County, Arkansas =

Pea Ridge, Arkansas
- Unincorporated community
- Location in Arkansas Pea Ridge (the United States)
- Coordinates: 33°55′14″N 91°20′12″W
- Country: United States
- State: Arkansas
- County: Desha
- Township: Red Fork
- Elevation: 157 ft (48 m)
- Time zone: UTC-6 (Central (CST))
  - Summer (DST): UTC-5 (CDT)
- GNIS feature ID: 53239

Pea Ridge is an unincorporated community in Desha County, Arkansas, United States. The community is located at the corner of Arkansas Highway 1 and Arkansas Highway 277.
