= Bay Bayou =

- Interactive map of Bay Bayou
- Location: Arkansas County, Arkansas
- Coordinates: 34°04′03″N 91°24′29″W
- Type: lake
- Surface elevation: 164 feet (50 m)

Bay Bayou is a small lake in Arkansas County, Arkansas.
