= Desha County, Arkansas =

County in Arkansas, United States

- County
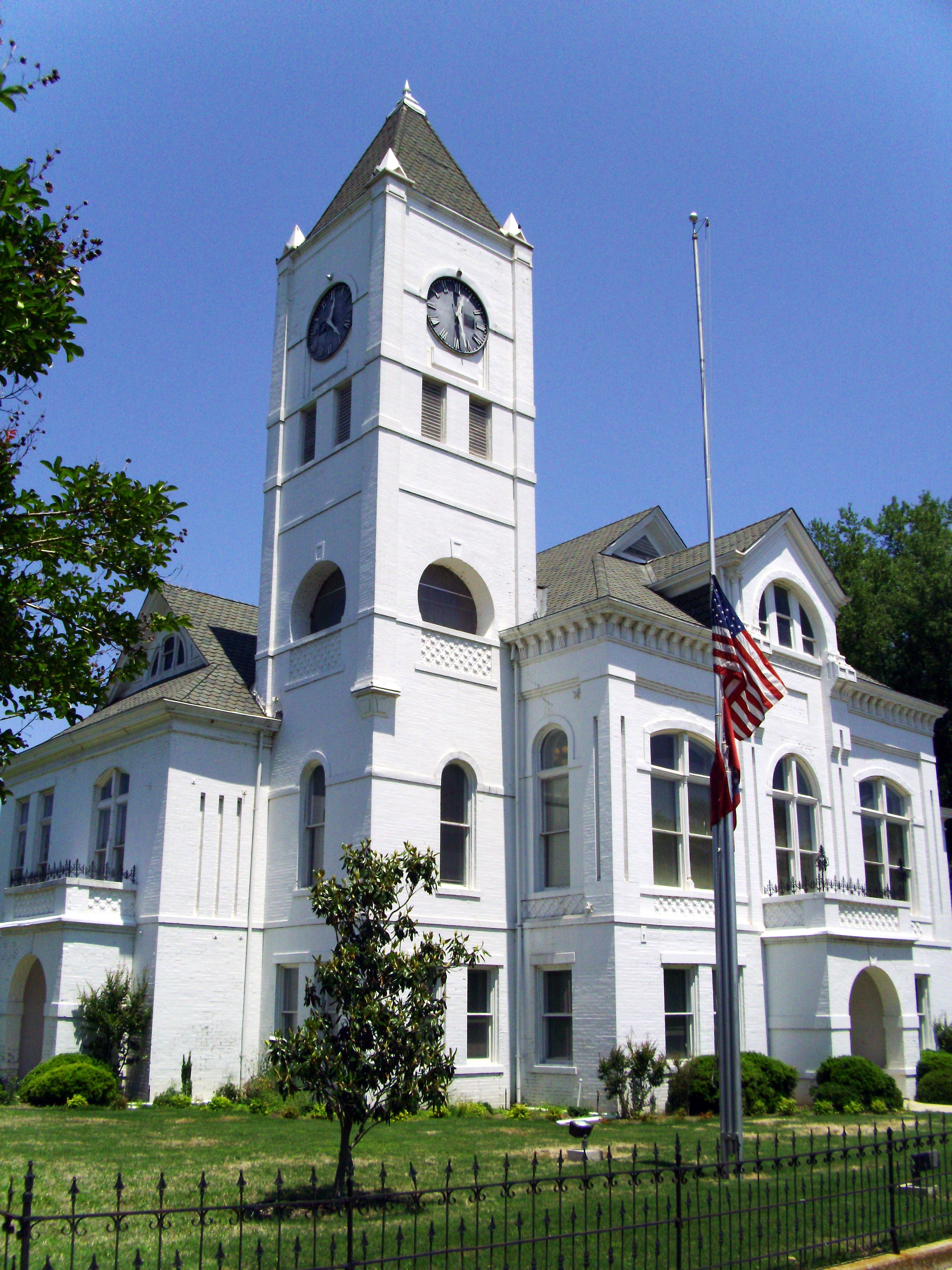
- Desha County Courthouse in Arkansas City

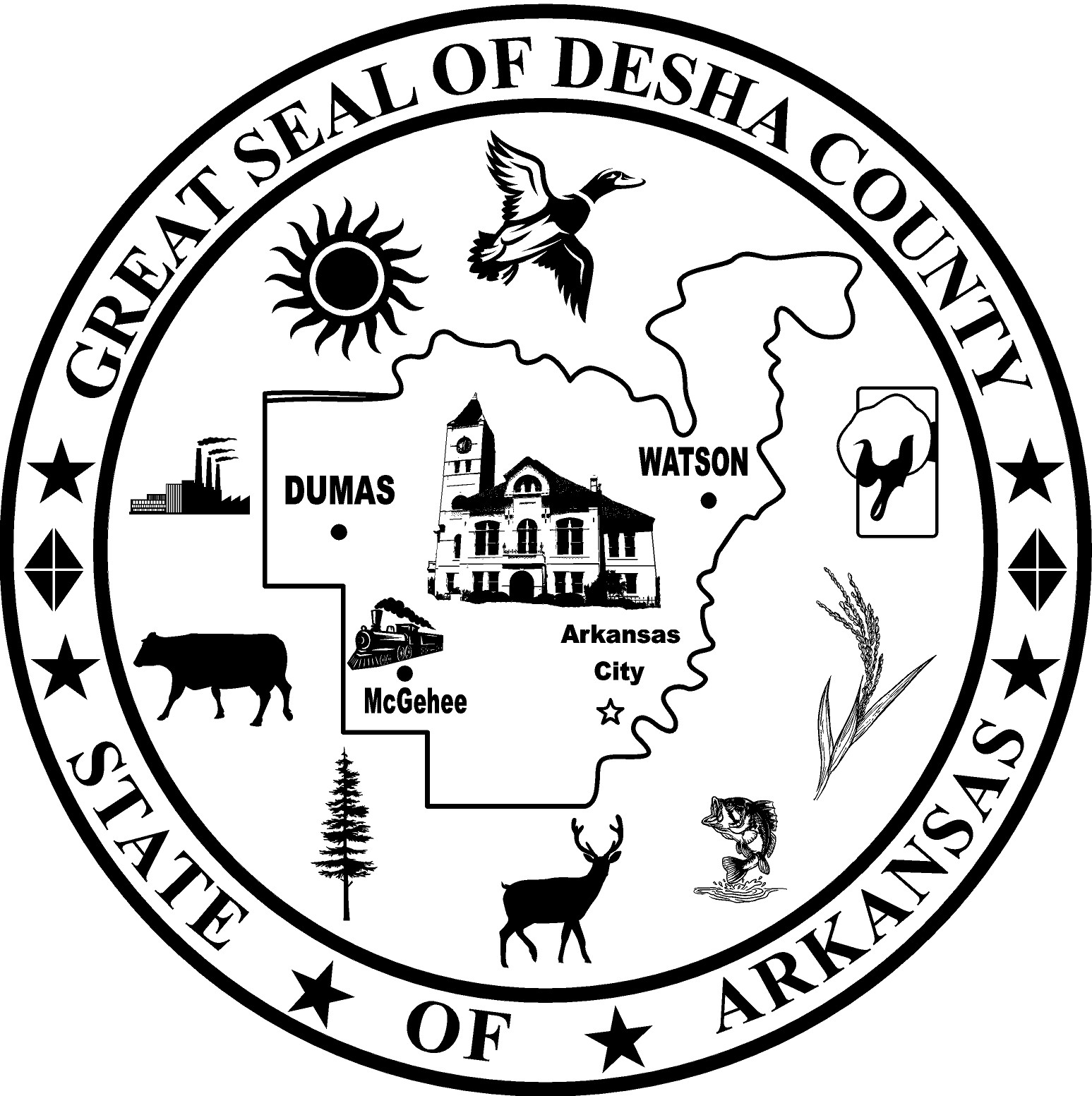
- Seal

- Location within the U.S. state of Arkansas
- Coordinates: 33°45′28″N 91°17′14″W
- Country: United States
- State: Arkansas
- Founded: December 12, 1838
- Named for: Benjamin Desha
- Seat: Arkansas City
- Largest city: Dumas

Government
  - County Judge: Richard Tindall

Area
  - Total: 820 sq mi (2,100 km^{2})
  - Land: 768 sq mi (1,990 km^{2})
  - Water: 51 sq mi (130 km^{2}) 6.3%

Population (2020)
  - Total: 11,395
  - Estimate (2025): 9,984 ▼
  - Density: 14.8/sq mi (5.73/km^{2})
- Time zone: UTC−6 (Central)
  - Summer (DST): UTC−5 (CDT)
- Congressional district: 1st
- Website: deshacounty.arkansas.gov

Desha County (/dəˈʃeɪ/ də-SHAY) is a county located in the southeast part of the U.S. state of Arkansas, with its eastern border the Mississippi River. At the 2020 census, the population was 11,395. The county is plurality-African American. The county seat is Arkansas City.

== History ==
Desha County was created by the Arkansas Legislature on December 12, 1838, consisting of the lands of Arkansas County separated from the county seat by the Arkansas River and the White River, and land from Chicot County. The county was named for Captain Benjamin Desha, who fought in the War of 1812.

Located in the Arkansas Delta, Desha County's rivers and fertile soils proved to be prosperous for planters under the cotton-based slave society of plantation agriculture in the antebellum years. After the Civil War, cotton continued as the primary commodity crop into the early 20th century, and planters did well. Labor was provided by sharecroppers and tenant farmers.

Following widespread farm mechanization, laborers were thrown off the land, and Desha County had a demographic and economic transformation. Thousands of African-American farm workers left the area and went north or west in the Great Migration, and there was a decline in population. Farm holdings have been consolidated into industrial-scale farms, with few governmental benefits for small farmers, and the economy cannot support much activity. In the 21st century, the county is seeking to reverse population and economic losses through better education for its workforce, and developing tourism based on its cultural, historical and outdoor recreation amenities.

During World War II, the federal government established the Rohwer War Relocation Center, an internment camp for Japanese nationals and Japanese Americans it forced out of the coastal area of California, the U.S. Pacific Northwest, and Alaska. The camp operated from late 1942 into 1945 and the end of the war, holding up to nearly 8500 ethnic Japanese, many American-born citizens. The Rohwer War Relocation Center Cemetery has been designated as a National Historic Landmark.

== Geography ==
According to the U.S. Census Bureau, the county has a total area of 820 square miles (2,100 km^{2}), of which 768 square miles (1,990 km^{2}) is land and 51 square miles (130 km^{2}) (6.3%) is water. Desha County is within the Arkansas Delta and is considered a member of the Southeast Arkansas region.

=== Major highways ===
- Future Interstate 69
- U.S. Highway 65
- U.S. Highway 165
- U.S. Highway 278
- Highway 1
- Highway 4
- Highway 54
- Highway 138
- Highway 159
- Highway 169
- Highway 208
- Highway 212
- Highway 277
- Highway 980

=== Adjacent counties ===
- Arkansas County (north)
- Phillips County (northeast)
- Bolivar County, Mississippi (east)
- Chicot County (south)
- Drew County (southwest)
- Lincoln County (northwest)

=== National protected area ===
- White River National Wildlife Refuge (part)

== Demographics ==
Historical population
Census	Pop.	Note	%±
1840	1,598		—
1850	2,911		82.2%
1860	6,459		121.9%
1870	6,125		−5.2%
1880	8,973		46.5%
1890	10,324		15.1%
1900	11,511		11.5%
1910	15,274		32.7%
1920	20,297		32.9%
1930	21,814		7.5%
1940	27,160		24.5%
1950	25,155		−7.4%
1960	20,770		−17.4%
1970	18,761		−9.7%
1980	19,760		5.3%
1990	16,798		−15.0%
2000	15,341		−8.7%
2010	13,008		−15.2%
2020	11,395		−12.4%
2025 (est.)	9,984	▼	−12.4%
U.S. Decennial Census; 1790–1960 1900–1990; 1990–2000 2010

The county has been depopulating since 1940, almost always losing population decade after decade, like some other rural Black Belt counties.

=== 2020 census ===
As of the 2020 census, the county had a population of 11,395. The median age was 40.7 years. 24.5% of residents were under the age of 18 and 19.1% of residents were 65 years of age or older. For every 100 females there were 90.1 males, and for every 100 females age 18 and over there were 86.3 males age 18 and over.

The racial makeup of the county was 42.5% White, 47.4% Black or African American, 0.4% American Indian and Alaska Native, 0.5% Asian, <0.1% Native Hawaiian and Pacific Islander, 4.6% from some other race, and 4.5% from two or more races. Hispanic or Latino residents of any race comprised 6.8% of the population.

37.8% of residents lived in urban areas, while 62.2% lived in rural areas.

There were 4,891 households in the county, of which 30.3% had children under the age of 18 living in them. Of all households, 35.7% were married-couple households, 21.4% were households with a male householder and no spouse or partner present, and 38.0% were households with a female householder and no spouse or partner present. About 34.5% of all households were made up of individuals and 14.3% had someone living alone who was 65 years of age or older.

There were 5,795 housing units, of which 15.6% were vacant. Among occupied housing units, 57.1% were owner-occupied and 42.9% were renter-occupied. The homeowner vacancy rate was 1.8% and the rental vacancy rate was 8.0%.

=== 2000 census ===
As of the 2000 census, there were 15,341 people, 5,922 households, and 4,192 families residing in the county. The population density was 20 people per square mile (7.7 people/km^{2}). There were 6,663 housing units at an average density of 9 units per square mile (3.5 units/km^{2}). The racial makeup of the county was 50.50% White, 46.33% Black or African American, 0.35% Native American, 0.30% Asian, 0.03% Pacific Islander, 1.73% from other races, and 0.76% from two or more races. 3.16% of the population were Hispanic or Latino of any race.

There were 5,922 households, out of which 34.60% had children under the age of 18 living with them, 46.50% were married couples living together, 19.90% had a female householder with no husband present, and 29.20% were non-families. 26.90% of all households were made up of individuals, and 12.70% had someone living alone who was 65 years of age or older. The average household size was 2.57 and the average family size was 3.10.

In the county, the population was spread out, with 28.90% under the age of 18, 9.00% from 18 to 24, 25.20% from 25 to 44, 22.70% from 45 to 64, and 14.20% who were 65 years of age or older. The median age was 36 years. For every 100 females, there were 87.60 males. For every 100 females age 18 and over, there were 82.90 males.

The median income for a household in the county was $24,121, and the median income for a family was $30,028. Males had a median income of $29,623 versus $18,913 for females. The per capita income for the county was $13,446. About 23.60% of families and 28.90% of the population were below the poverty line, including 39.60% of those under age 18 and 24.00% of those age 65 or over.

== Government ==
=== Government ===
The county government is a constitutional body granted specific powers by the Constitution of Arkansas and the Arkansas Code. The quorum court is the legislative branch of the county government and controls all spending and revenue collection. Representatives are called justices of the peace and are elected from county districts every even-numbered year. The number of districts in a county vary from nine to fifteen, and district boundaries are drawn by the county election commission. The Desha County Quorum Court has nine members. Presiding over quorum court meetings is the county judge, who serves as the chief operating officer of the county. The county judge is elected at-large and does not vote in quorum court business, although capable of vetoing quorum court decisions.

Desha County elected countywide officials
Position	Officeholder	Party
County Jjdge	Richard Tindall	Democratic
County clerk	Valerie Donaldson	Democratic
Circuit clerk	Kristen N. Christmas	Democratic
Sheriff	Mitch Grant	Democratic
Treasurer	Shirley Snow Kozubski	Democratic
Collector	Lisa Hutchison	Republican
Assessor	Jessica Ferguson	Democratic
Coroner	Jamie Evans	Republican

The composition of the Quorum Court following the 2024 elections is five Democrats and four Republicans. Justices of the Peace (members) of the Quorum Court following the elections are:

- District 1: Troy Jackson Jr. (D)
- District 2: G. Lynn Weatherford (D)
- District 3: Patricia Watkins (D)
- District 4: Rick Helton (D)
- District 5: Hollis Mankin (R)
- District 6: Ken Holt (R)
- District 7: Rita K. Kolb (R)
- District 8: Dollie Ann Wilson (D)
- District 9: Norris Sims (R)

Additionally, the townships of Desha County are entitled to elect their own respective constables, as set forth by the Constitution of Arkansas. Constables are largely of historical significance as they were used to keep the peace in rural areas when travel was more difficult. The township constables as of the 2024 elections are:

- Randolph: Dennis Blankenship (R)

=== Politics ===
Desha County had consistently voted Democratic, even as Arkansas as a whole has strongly shifted to the Republican Party and the margins in the county shrinking due to depopulation, voting for the Democratic nominee in every presidential election from 1972 to 2020. In 2020, Joe Biden became the first Democrat since Walter Mondale to fall under 50% in the county, winning a plurality. In 2024, Donald Trump became the first Republican since Richard Nixon in 1972 to win the county.

United States presidential election results for Desha County, Arkansas
Year	Republican		Democratic		Third party(ies)	
Year	No.	%	No.	%	No.	%
1896	290	40.50%	396	55.31%	30	4.19%
1900	168	33.27%	328	64.95%	9	1.78%
1904	82	28.57%	204	71.08%	1	0.35%
1908	263	33.21%	518	65.40%	11	1.39%
1912	52	9.63%	314	58.15%	174	32.22%
1916	369	27.77%	960	72.23%	0	0.00%
1920	360	27.40%	931	70.85%	23	1.75%
1924	209	21.55%	540	55.67%	221	22.78%
1928	331	23.39%	1,082	76.47%	2	0.14%
1932	81	4.94%	1,549	94.51%	9	0.55%
1936	55	3.75%	1,411	96.12%	2	0.14%
1940	146	9.57%	1,370	89.78%	10	0.66%
1944	186	13.66%	1,175	86.27%	1	0.07%
1948	233	7.68%	2,122	69.96%	678	22.35%
1952	1,037	24.74%	3,150	75.14%	5	0.12%
1956	1,204	28.73%	2,935	70.03%	52	1.24%
1960	1,063	27.01%	2,502	63.57%	371	9.43%
1964	1,930	36.86%	3,294	62.91%	12	0.23%
1968	972	17.00%	2,270	39.71%	2,474	43.28%
1972	3,385	66.92%	1,665	32.92%	8	0.16%
1976	1,372	24.50%	4,228	75.50%	0	0.00%
1980	2,057	34.07%	3,748	62.08%	232	3.84%
1984	2,696	45.87%	2,918	49.64%	264	4.49%
1988	2,334	42.94%	2,859	52.60%	242	4.45%
1992	1,279	22.75%	3,815	67.87%	527	9.38%
1996	978	21.48%	3,230	70.94%	345	7.58%
2000	1,603	35.66%	2,776	61.76%	116	2.58%
2004	1,729	37.21%	2,851	61.35%	67	1.44%
2008	1,999	42.73%	2,569	54.92%	110	2.35%
2012	1,896	42.90%	2,443	55.27%	81	1.83%
2016	1,919	45.08%	2,228	52.34%	110	2.58%
2020	1,921	46.13%	2,016	48.41%	227	5.45%
2024	1,805	51.50%	1,638	46.73%	62	1.77%

== Communities ==
=== Cities ===
- Arkansas City (county seat)
- Dumas
- McGehee
- Mitchellville
- Tillar (partly in Drew County)
- Watson

=== Towns ===
- Reed

=== Census-designated place ===
- Halley

=== Unincorporated areas ===
- Back Gate
- Kelso
- Masonville
- McArthur
- Pea Ridge
- Pendleton
- Pickens
- Rohwer
- Snow Lake
- Yancopin

=== Historic community ===
- Napoleon

=== Townships ===
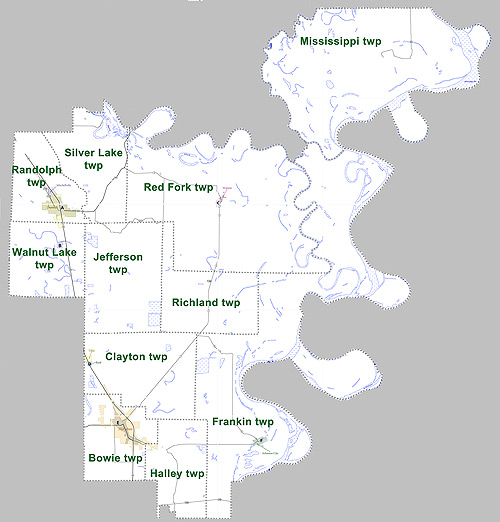
Townships in Desha County, Arkansas as of 2010

Townships in Arkansas are the divisions of a county. Each township includes unincorporated areas; some may have incorporated cities or towns within part of their boundaries. Arkansas townships have limited purposes in modern times. However, the United States census does list Arkansas population based on townships (sometimes referred to as "county subdivisions" or "minor civil divisions"). Townships are also of value for historical purposes in terms of genealogical research. Each town or city is within one or more townships in an Arkansas county based on census maps and publications. The townships of Desha County are listed below; listed in parentheses are the cities, towns, and/or census-designated places that are fully or partially inside the township.

- Bowie (most of McGehee)
- Clayton (Reed, Tillar, small part of McGehee)
- Franklin (Arkansas City)
- Halley (small part of McGehee)
- Jefferson
- Mississippi
- Randolph (Mitchellville, most of Dumas)
- Red Fork (Watson)
- Richland
- Silver Lake
- Walnut Lake

== Notable people ==
- John "Kayo" Dottley
- Jim Hines
- John H. Johnson
- Major Jones
- Doug Terry
- Barry Williamson

== See also ==
- List of lakes in Desha County, Arkansas
- National Register of Historic Places listings in Desha County, Arkansas
