= 2024 United States presidential election in Arkansas =

- November 5, 2024
- Turnout: 65.10% (▼1.80 pp)

Nominee	Donald Trump	Kamala Harris
Party	Republican	Democratic
Home state	Florida	California
Running mate	JD Vance	Tim Walz
Electoral vote	6	0
Popular vote	759,241	396,905
Percentage	64.20%	33.56%

Trump
40–50%
50–60%
60–70%
70–80%
80–90%
90–100%
Harris
40–50%
50–60%
60–70%
70–80%
80–90%
90–100%
Tie/no data
President before election
Joe Biden
Democratic
Elected President
Donald Trump
Republican

The 2024 United States presidential election in Arkansas took place on Tuesday, November 5, 2024, as part of the 2024 United States elections in which all 50 states plus the District of Columbia participated. Arkansas voters chose electors to represent them in the Electoral College via a popular vote. The state of Arkansas has six electoral votes in the Electoral College, following reapportionment due to the 2020 United States census in which the state neither gained nor lost a seat.

Trump easily carried the state for the third time in a row in 2024, this time by a 30.64-point margin, which marks the eighth consecutive presidential election cycle in which Republicans have increased their presidential margins in Arkansas. Trump's margin of victory in the state was the highest since 1972. Democrats have not won a presidential election in Arkansas since 1996.

== Primary elections ==
=== Democratic primary ===
The Arkansas Democratic primary was held on Super Tuesday, March 5, 2024.

2024 Arkansas Democratic pres. primary
Candidate	Votes	%	Delegates
Joe Biden (incumbent)	71,978	88.52	31
Marianne Williamson	3,883	4.78	0
Dean Phillips	2,346	2.89	0
Stephen Lyons	1,442	1.77	0
Armando Perez-Serrato	879	1.08	0
Frankie Lozada	786	0.97	0
Total	81,314	100%	31

=== Republican primary ===
The Arkansas Republican primary was held on Super Tuesday, March 5, 2024.

Arkansas Republican primary, March 5, 2024
Candidate	Votes	Percentage	Actual delegate count		
Candidate	Votes	Percentage	Bound	Unbound	Total
Donald Trump	204,898	76.89%	39		39
Nikki Haley	49,085	18.42%	1		1
Asa Hutchinson (withdrawn)	7,377	2.77%			
Ron DeSantis (withdrawn)	3,162	1.19%			
Vivek Ramaswamy (withdrawn)	860	0.32%			
Chris Christie (withdrawn)	600	0.23%			
Ryan Binkley (withdrawn)	183	0.07%			
Doug Burgum (withdrawn)	157	0.06%			
David Stuckenberg	151	0.06%			
Total:	266,473	100.00%	40		40

== General election ==
=== Predictions ===
Source	Ranking	As of
Cook Political Report	Solid R	December 19, 2023
Inside Elections	Solid R	April 26, 2023
Sabato's Crystal Ball	Safe R	June 29, 2023
Decision Desk HQ/The Hill	Safe R	December 14, 2023
CNalysis	Solid R	December 30, 2023
CNN	Solid R	January 14, 2024
The Economist	Safe R	June 12, 2024
538	Solid R	June 11, 2024
RCP	Solid R	June 26, 2024
NBC News	Safe R	October 6, 2024

=== Polling ===
Donald J. Trump vs. Kamala Harris vs. Robert F. Kennedy Jr. vs. Cornel West vs. Jill Stein vs. Chase Oliver

Poll source	Date(s) administered	Sample size (Note: Key: A – all adults RV – registered voters LV – likely voters V – unclear)	Margin of error	Donald J. Trump Republican	Kamala Harris Democratic	Robert F. Kennedy Jr. Independent	Cornel West Independent	Jill Stein Green	Chase Oliver Libertarian	Other / Undecided
Hendrix College (Note: Poll sponsored by Talk Business & Politics)	September 5–6, 2024	696 (RV)	± 4.6 points	55%	40%	1%	–	0%	1%	1%

Hypothetical polling with Donald J. Trump and Joe Biden

Donald J. Trump vs. Joe Biden

Poll source	Date(s) administered	Sample size	Margin of error	Donald J. Trump Republican	Joe Biden Democratic	Other / Undecided
	July 21, 2024	Joe Biden withdraws from the race.				
John Zogby Strategies (Note: Poll conducted for Kennedy's campaign)	April 13–21, 2024	385 (LV)	–	48%	42%	10%
Emerson College	October 1–4, 2023	435 (RV)	± 4.7%	57%	24%	19%
Echelon Insights (Note: Poll sponsored by NetChoice)	August 31 – September 7, 2022	600 (LV)	± 7.7%	58%	33%	9%

Hypothetical polling with other candidates

Donald J. Trump vs. Robert F. Kennedy Jr.

Poll source	Date(s) administered	Sample size	Margin of error	Donald J. Trump Republican	Robert Kennedy Jr. Independent	Other / Undecided
John Zogby Strategies	April 13–21, 2024	385 (LV)	–	44%	42%	14%

Robert F. Kennedy Jr. vs. Joe Biden

Poll source	Date(s) administered	Sample size	Margin of error	Robert Kennedy Jr. Independent	Joe Biden Democratic	Other / Undecided
John Zogby Strategies	April 13–21, 2024	385 (LV)	–	53%	35%	12%

Ron DeSantis vs. Joe Biden

Poll source	Date(s) administered	Sample size	Margin of error	Ron DeSantis Republican	Joe Biden Democratic	Other / Undecided
Echelon Insights	August 31 – September 7, 2022	600 (LV)	± 7.7%	49%	31%	20%

=== Results ===
State House district results: Trump 40–50% 50–60% 60–70% 70–80% 80–90% / Harris 40–50% 50–60% 60–70% 70–80% 80–90%

2024 United States presidential election in Arkansas
Party	Candidate	Votes	%	±%
Republican	Donald Trump; JD Vance	759,241	64.20%	+1.80%
Democratic	Kamala Harris; Tim Walz	396,905	33.56%	–1.22%
Independent	Robert F. Kennedy Jr. (withdrawn); Nicole Shanahan (withdrawn)	13,255	1.12%	N/A
Libertarian	Chase Oliver; Mike ter Maat	5,715	0.48%	–0.60%
Green	Jill Stein; Butch Ware	4,275	0.36%	+0.12%
American Solidarity	Peter Sonski; Lauren Onak	2,141	0.18%	+0.04%
Prohibition	Michael Wood; John Pietrowski	1,144	0.10%	N/A
Total votes		1,182,676	100.00%	N/A

==== By county ====
County	Donald Trump Republican		Kamala Harris Democratic		Various candidates Other parties		Margin		Total
County	#	%	#	%	#	%	#	%	Total
Arkansas	3,951	71.23%	1,503	27.10%	93	1.68%	2,448	44.13%	5,547
Ashley	5,145	73.19%	1,774	25.23%	111	1.58%	3,371	47.96%	7,030
Baxter	16,253	77.57%	4,341	20.72%	360	1.72%	11,912	56.85%	20,954
Benton	79,907	62.14%	45,231	35.17%	3,457	2.69%	34,676	26.97%	128,595
Boone	13,968	81.63%	2,854	16.68%	290	1.69%	11,114	64.95%	17,112
Bradley	2,213	68.96%	961	29.95%	35	1.09%	1,252	39.01%	3,209
Calhoun	1,674	80.02%	379	18.12%	39	1.86%	1,295	61.90%	2,092
Carroll	7,470	64.74%	3,812	33.04%	256	2.22%	3,658	31.70%	11,538
Chicot	1,658	47.51%	1,796	51.46%	36	1.03%	-138	-3.95%	3,490
Clark	4,526	59.11%	2,959	38.64%	172	2.25%	1,567	20.47%	7,657
Clay	3,968	79.89%	907	18.26%	92	1.85%	3,061	61.63%	4,967
Cleburne	10,595	83.17%	1,941	15.24%	203	1.59%	8,654	67.93%	12,739
Cleveland	2,804	83.11%	524	15.53%	46	1.36%	2,280	67.58%	3,374
Columbia	5,367	67.59%	2,466	31.06%	107	1.35%	2,901	36.53%	7,940
Conway	5,893	69.00%	2,449	28.67%	199	2.33%	3,444	40.33%	8,541
Craighead	25,152	67.54%	11,210	30.10%	880	2.36%	13,942	37.44%	37,242
Crawford	18,615	78.10%	4,753	19.94%	466	1.96%	13,862	58.16%	23,834
Crittenden	7,028	47.87%	7,362	50.15%	291	1.98%	-334	-2.28%	14,681
Cross	4,753	72.74%	1,642	25.13%	139	2.13%	3,111	47.61%	6,534
Dallas	1,482	63.77%	798	34.34%	44	1.89%	684	29.43%	2,324
Desha	1,805	51.50%	1,638	46.73%	62	1.77%	167	4.77%	3,505
Drew	4,203	66.03%	2,050	32.21%	112	1.76%	2,153	33.82%	6,365
Faulkner	35,357	64.92%	17,752	32.59%	1,356	2.49%	17,605	32.33%	54,465
Franklin	5,582	80.07%	1,232	17.67%	157	2.25%	4,350	62.40%	6,971
Fulton	4,040	80.11%	906	17.97%	97	1.92%	3,134	62.14%	5,043
Garland	28,359	67.00%	13,015	30.75%	953	2.25%	15,344	36.25%	42,327
Grant	6,755	83.62%	1,192	14.76%	131	1.62%	5,563	68.86%	8,078
Greene	12,617	79.75%	2,935	18.55%	268	1.69%	9,682	61.20%	15,820
Hempstead	4,193	68.86%	1,776	29.17%	120	1.97%	2,417	39.69%	6,089
Hot Spring	9,226	75.11%	2,818	22.94%	239	1.95%	6,408	52.17%	12,283
Howard	3,246	72.57%	1,158	25.89%	69	1.54%	2,088	46.68%	4,473
Independence	11,023	78.67%	2,689	19.19%	299	2.13%	8,334	59.48%	14,011
Izard	4,854	81.92%	949	16.02%	122	2.06%	3,905	65.90%	5,925
Jackson	3,509	73.49%	1,183	24.77%	83	1.74%	2,326	48.72%	4,775
Jefferson	8,468	39.19%	12,802	59.25%	338	1.56%	-4,334	-20.06%	21,608
Johnson	6,766	74.69%	2,107	23.26%	186	2.05%	4,659	51.43%	9,059
Lafayette	1,589	68.34%	698	30.02%	38	1.63%	891	38.32%	2,325
Lawrence	4,608	80.96%	965	16.95%	119	2.09%	3,643	64.01%	5,692
Lee	1,181	46.87%	1,270	50.40%	69	2.74%	-89	-3.53%	2,520
Lincoln	2,502	74.20%	813	24.11%	57	1.69%	1,689	50.09%	3,372
Little River	3,744	76.42%	1,084	22.13%	71	1.45%	2,660	54.29%	4,899
Logan	6,567	80.04%	1,464	17.84%	174	2.12%	5,103	62.20%	8,205
Lonoke	23,225	75.85%	6,790	22.18%	605	1.98%	16,435	53.67%	30,620
Madison	5,885	78.46%	1,491	19.88%	125	1.67%	4,394	58.58%	7,501
Marion	6,230	79.35%	1,501	19.12%	120	1.53%	4,729	60.23%	7,851
Miller	11,842	74.94%	3,769	23.85%	192	1.21%	8,073	51.09%	15,803
Mississippi	6,963	64.97%	3,574	33.35%	180	1.68%	3,389	31.62%	10,717
Monroe	1,385	56.93%	1,002	41.18%	46	1.89%	383	15.75%	2,433
Montgomery	2,987	80.58%	645	17.40%	75	2.02%	2,342	63.18%	3,707
Nevada	2,002	68.87%	849	29.21%	56	1.93%	1,153	39.66%	2,907
Newton	3,063	81.25%	644	17.08%	63	1.67%	2,419	64.17%	3,770
Ouachita	5,056	58.61%	3,412	39.55%	158	1.83%	1,644	19.06%	8,626
Perry	3,559	77.64%	923	20.14%	102	2.23%	2,636	57.50%	4,584
Phillips	2,098	42.49%	2,754	55.77%	86	1.74%	-656	-13.28%	4,938
Pike	3,746	85.96%	560	12.85%	52	1.19%	3,186	73.11%	4,358
Poinsett	5,731	80.96%	1,235	17.45%	113	1.60%	4,496	63.51%	7,079
Polk	6,987	84.30%	1,145	13.82%	156	1.88%	5,842	70.48%	8,288
Pope	18,118	74.90%	5,487	22.68%	586	2.42%	12,631	52.22%	24,191
Prairie	2,628	82.13%	524	16.38%	48	1.50%	2,104	65.75%	3,200
Pulaski	57,977	37.67%	92,038	59.79%	3,909	2.54%	-34,061	-22.12%	153,924
Randolph	5,367	80.88%	1,138	17.15%	131	1.97%	4,229	63.73%	6,636
Saline	39,736	68.98%	16,609	28.83%	1,264	2.19%	23,127	40.15%	57,609
Scott	2,913	86.08%	425	12.56%	46	1.36%	2,488	73.52%	3,384
Searcy	3,305	85.42%	511	13.21%	53	1.37%	2,794	72.21%	3,869
Sebastian	30,719	67.59%	13,652	30.04%	1,081	2.38%	17,067	37.55%	45,452
Sevier	3,772	80.02%	862	18.29%	80	1.70%	2,910	61.73%	4,714
Sharp	5,978	80.38%	1,316	17.70%	143	1.92%	4,662	62.68%	7,437
St. Francis	2,909	48.65%	2,953	49.39%	117	1.96%	-44	-0.74%	5,979
Stone	4,808	79.73%	1,089	18.06%	133	2.21%	3,719	61.67%	6,030
Union	10,196	66.00%	5,019	32.49%	233	1.51%	5,177	33.51%	15,448
Van Buren	6,023	79.03%	1,437	18.86%	161	2.11%	4,586	60.17%	7,621
Washington	50,243	51.71%	43,779	45.06%	3,136	3.23%	6,464	6.65%	97,158
White	24,514	79.50%	5,641	18.29%	682	2.21%	18,873	61.21%	30,837
Woodruff	1,513	65.27%	760	32.79%	45	1.94%	753	32.48%	2,318
Yell	5,147	79.47%	1,213	18.73%	117	1.81%	3,934	60.74%	6,477
Totals	759,241	64.20%	396,905	33.56%	26,530	2.24%	362,336	30.64%	1,182,676

Counties that flipped from Democratic to Republican

- Desha (largest municipality: Dumas)

==== By congressional district ====
Trump won all four congressional districts.

District	Trump	Harris	Representative
1st	71.69%	26.40%	Rick Crawford
2nd	56.56%	41.03%	French Hill
3rd	61.08%	36.19%	Steve Womack
4th	69.03%	29.12%	Bruce Westerman

== Analysis ==
Although former Democratic President Bill Clinton hails from the state and comfortably won it in both of his victories (1992 and 1996), Arkansas is a Southern state in the Bible Belt that has trended strongly towards the Republican Party in the 21st century, with Al Gore (from neighboring Tennessee) losing the state in 2000 by 5.45%. The last Democratic presidential candidate to come within single digits of carrying Arkansas, or even win more than 40% of the state vote, was John Kerry in 2004. The state's rightward shift continued under Barack Obama, leading to Arkansas becoming a Republican stronghold at the presidential level. In 2008, Obama became the first Democrat to win without carrying Arkansas despite decisively winning nationwide.

The GOP's popularity in Arkansas has become so pronounced that the state turned sharply against former First Lady of Arkansas Hillary Clinton in 2016, favoring Republican Donald Trump by 26.9%. Trump easily won the state again by 27.6% in 2020. In addition, Republicans have held all statewide elected positions in Arkansas since 2015.

Trump became the first Republican to carry the plurality-Black Delta county of Desha in a presidential election since landslide victor Richard Nixon in 1972, when he carried every county in the state. Trump's success in Desha, as well as his narrowed margin in other Delta region counties, was partially attributed to a decreased turnout rate in the traditionally Democratic region (of the 10 counties in the state with the lowest turnout, 4 were in the Delta despite the Delta containing only 20% of the state's counties).

== See also ==
- United States presidential elections in Arkansas
- 2024 United States presidential election
- 2024 Democratic Party presidential primaries
- 2024 Republican Party presidential primaries
- 2024 United States elections

== Notes ==
Partisan clients
