= 1972 United States presidential election in Arkansas =

- November 7, 1972

Nominee	Richard Nixon	George McGovern
Party	Republican	Democratic
Home state	California	South Dakota
Running mate	Spiro Agnew	Sargent Shriver
Electoral vote	6	0
Popular vote	445,751	198,899
Percentage	68.82%	30.71%
County results
Nixon
50–60%
60–70%
70–80%
80–90%
President before election
Richard Nixon
Republican
Elected President
Richard Nixon
Republican

The 1972 United States presidential election in Arkansas took place on November 7, 1972, as part of the 1972 United States presidential election. State voters chose six representatives, or electors, to the Electoral College, who voted for president and vice president.

Arkansas was won by incumbent President Richard Nixon (R–California), with 68.82% of the popular vote, against George McGovern (D–South Dakota), with 30.71% of the popular vote. John G. Schmitz was the only other candidate on the ballot, and, as the candidate for the American Independent Party, he received just over three thousand votes.

In a state that would reflect McGovern's national results, the Democratic nominee did not win a single county in Arkansas. This marked the first time that Arkansas had voted Republican in a presidential election since Ulysses S. Grant carried the state 100 years prior in 1872, and made Nixon only the second Republican (after Grant) to ever carry the state. As of 2024, this remains the strongest-ever Republican presidential performance in Arkansas, the only time that a Republican has swept every county in the state, and, along with 1932, the second of two times any candidate has done so.

As of 2024, this is the last presidential election in which the Republican carried Phillips County, Jefferson County, Lee County, and Chicot County in a presidential election. Hot Spring County would not vote Republican again until 2004, Jackson, Lincoln, and Clark counties until 2008, Woodruff County until 2016, and Desha County until 2024. Among white voters, 80% supported Nixon while 19% supported McGovern.

== Results ==
1972 United States presidential election in Arkansas
Party	Candidate	Votes	%
Republican	Richard Nixon (inc.)	445,751	68.82%
Democratic	George McGovern	198,899	30.71%
American Independent	John G. Schmitz	3,016	0.47%
Total votes		647,666	100%

=== Results by county ===
County	Richard Nixon Republican		George McGovern Democratic		John G. Schmitz American Independent		Margin		Totals votes cast
County	#	%	#	%	#	%	#	%	Totals votes cast
Arkansas	5,225	73.46%	1,849	25.99%	39	0.55%	3,376	47.47%	7,113
Ashley	5,506	76.44%	1,680	23.32%	17	0.24%	3,826	53.12%	7,203
Baxter	6,754	70.65%	2,677	28.00%	129	1.35%	4,077	42.65%	9,560
Benton	14,621	77.86%	4,083	21.74%	74	0.39%	10,538	56.12%	18,778
Boone	5,484	74.49%	1,862	25.29%	16	0.22%	3,622	49.20%	7,362
Bradley	3,218	69.74%	1,368	29.65%	28	0.61%	1,850	40.09%	4,614
Calhoun	1,298	64.26%	707	35.00%	15	0.74%	591	29.26%	2,020
Carroll	3,565	70.09%	1,401	27.55%	120	2.36%	2,164	42.54%	5,086
Chicot	2,858	65.96%	1,469	33.90%	6	0.14%	1,389	32.06%	4,333
Clark	4,173	59.96%	2,741	39.38%	46	0.66%	1,432	20.58%	6,960
Clay	4,381	69.39%	1,933	30.61%	0	0.00%	2,448	38.78%	6,314
Cleburne	2,870	67.15%	1,400	32.76%	4	0.09%	1,470	34.39%	4,274
Cleveland	1,837	71.45%	734	28.55%	0	0.00%	1,103	42.90%	2,571
Columbia	5,801	72.30%	2,193	27.33%	29	0.36%	3,608	44.97%	8,023
Conway	4,187	58.11%	3,009	41.76%	9	0.12%	1,178	16.35%	7,205
Craighead	11,312	65.94%	5,843	34.06%	0	0.00%	5,469	31.88%	17,155
Crawford	6,974	81.41%	1,520	17.74%	72	0.84%	5,454	63.67%	8,566
Crittenden	7,971	71.06%	3,246	28.94%	0	0.00%	4,725	42.12%	11,217
Cross	3,743	72.78%	1,221	23.74%	179	3.48%	2,522	49.04%	5,143
Dallas	2,152	60.55%	1,402	39.45%	0	0.00%	750	21.10%	3,554
Desha	3,385	66.92%	1,665	32.92%	8	0.16%	1,720	34.00%	5,058
Drew	3,334	74.06%	1,168	25.94%	0	0.00%	2,166	48.12%	4,502
Faulkner	6,746	59.44%	4,604	40.56%	0	0.00%	2,142	18.88%	11,350
Franklin	3,678	74.60%	1,252	25.40%	0	0.00%	2,426	49.20%	4,930
Fulton	2,030	67.89%	960	32.11%	0	0.00%	1,070	35.78%	2,990
Garland	15,602	73.90%	5,207	24.66%	303	1.44%	10,395	49.24%	21,112
Grant	2,414	67.41%	1,147	32.03%	20	0.56%	1,267	35.38%	3,581
Greene	6,128	73.03%	2,263	26.97%	0	0.00%	3,865	46.06%	8,391
Hempstead	4,963	70.80%	2,047	29.20%	0	0.00%	2,916	41.60%	7,010
Hot Spring	5,378	64.54%	2,872	34.47%	83	1.00%	2,506	30.07%	8,333
Howard	2,682	71.50%	1,069	28.50%	0	0.00%	1,613	43.00%	3,751
Independence	5,076	65.74%	2,630	34.06%	15	0.19%	2,446	31.68%	7,721
Izard	2,001	64.26%	1,108	35.58%	5	0.16%	893	28.68%	3,114
Jackson	4,196	66.73%	2,092	33.27%	0	0.00%	2,104	33.46%	6,288
Jefferson	16,888	61.95%	10,346	37.95%	26	0.10%	6,542	24.00%	27,260
Johnson	4,107	66.76%	2,045	33.24%	0	0.00%	2,062	33.52%	6,152
Lafayette	2,460	71.91%	952	27.83%	9	0.26%	1,508	44.08%	3,421
Lawrence	3,981	69.45%	1,751	30.55%	0	0.00%	2,230	38.90%	5,732
Lee	3,540	64.59%	1,907	34.79%	34	0.62%	1,633	29.80%	5,481
Lincoln	2,318	67.52%	1,115	32.48%	0	0.00%	1,203	35.04%	3,433
Little River	2,550	70.04%	1,091	29.96%	0	0.00%	1,459	40.08%	3,641
Logan	4,964	71.42%	1,956	28.14%	30	0.43%	3,008	43.28%	6,950
Lonoke	5,298	67.62%	2,504	31.96%	33	0.42%	2,794	35.66%	7,835
Madison	3,372	64.09%	1,889	35.91%	0	0.00%	1,483	28.18%	5,261
Marion	2,331	66.66%	1,108	31.68%	58	1.66%	1,223	34.98%	3,497
Miller	8,355	74.53%	2,855	25.47%	0	0.00%	5,500	49.06%	11,210
Mississippi	10,931	74.73%	3,544	24.23%	152	1.04%	7,387	50.50%	14,627
Monroe	2,897	63.45%	1,578	34.56%	91	1.99%	1,319	28.89%	4,566
Montgomery	1,555	68.17%	688	30.16%	38	1.67%	867	38.01%	2,281
Nevada	2,513	68.07%	1,179	31.93%	0	0.00%	1,334	36.14%	3,692
Newton	1,924	69.84%	831	30.16%	0	0.00%	1,093	39.68%	2,755
Ouachita	6,620	62.68%	3,931	37.22%	11	0.10%	2,689	25.46%	10,562
Perry	1,445	63.88%	810	35.81%	7	0.31%	635	28.07%	2,262
Phillips	6,235	58.90%	4,283	40.46%	68	0.64%	1,952	18.44%	10,586
Pike	2,316	73.69%	798	25.39%	29	0.92%	1,518	48.30%	3,143
Poinsett	7,010	77.91%	1,908	21.20%	80	0.89%	5,102	56.71%	8,998
Polk	3,609	74.83%	1,120	23.22%	94	1.95%	2,489	51.61%	4,823
Pope	6,917	67.52%	3,302	32.23%	25	0.24%	3,615	35.29%	10,244
Prairie	2,186	71.46%	873	28.54%	0	0.00%	1,313	42.92%	3,059
Pulaski	57,576	62.95%	33,611	36.75%	281	0.31%	23,965	26.20%	91,468
Randolph	2,578	62.83%	1,525	37.17%	0	0.00%	1,053	25.66%	4,103
St. Francis	5,692	65.95%	2,674	30.98%	265	3.07%	3,018	34.97%	8,631
Saline	7,972	63.64%	4,503	35.95%	52	0.42%	3,469	27.69%	12,527
Scott	2,424	75.87%	771	24.13%	0	0.00%	1,653	51.74%	3,195
Searcy	3,163	78.76%	853	21.24%	0	0.00%	2,310	57.52%	4,016
Sebastian	25,219	81.23%	5,770	18.58%	58	0.19%	19,449	62.65%	31,047
Sevier	2,526	69.91%	1,048	29.01%	39	1.08%	1,478	40.90%	3,613
Sharp	2,677	69.71%	1,154	30.05%	9	0.23%	1,523	39.66%	3,840
Stone	1,989	67.38%	958	32.45%	5	0.17%	1,031	34.93%	2,952
Union	11,925	76.72%	3,531	22.72%	87	0.56%	8,394	54.00%	15,543
Van Buren	2,622	61.91%	1,594	37.64%	19	0.45%	1,028	24.27%	4,235
Washington	17,523	70.94%	7,108	28.78%	70	0.28%	10,415	42.16%	24,701
White	8,701	67.24%	4,161	32.15%	79	0.61%	4,540	35.09%	12,941
Woodruff	1,989	61.73%	1,183	36.72%	50	1.55%	806	25.01%	3,222
Yell	3,310	66.48%	1,669	33.52%	0	0.00%	1,641	32.96%	4,979
Totals	445,751	68.82%	198,899	30.71%	3,016	0.47%	246,852	38.11%	647,666

== See also ==
- United States presidential elections in Arkansas

== Works cited ==
- Black, Earl; Black, Merle (1992). The Vital South: How Presidents Are Elected. Harvard University Press. ISBN 0674941306.
