= National Register of Historic Places listings in Desha County, Arkansas =

Location of Desha County in Arkansas

Desha County, Arkansas, United States, has 27 properties and districts listed on the National Register of Historic Places, including one National Historic Landmark.

The locations of National Register properties and districts for which the latitude and longitude coordinates are included below may be seen on a map.

Contents: Counties in Arkansas
- Arkansas
- Ashley
- Baxter
- Benton
- Boone
- Bradley
- Calhoun
- Carroll
- Chicot
- Clark
- Clay
- Cleburne
- Cleveland
- Columbia
- Conway
- Craighead
- Crawford
- Crittenden
- Cross
- Dallas
- Desha
- Drew
- Faulkner
- Franklin
- Fulton
- Garland
- Grant
- Greene
- Hempstead
- Hot Spring
- Howard
- Independence
- Izard
- Jackson
- Jefferson
- Johnson
- Lafayette
- Lawrence
- Lee
- Lincoln
- Little River
- Logan
- Lonoke
- Madison
- Marion
- Miller
- Mississippi
- Monroe
- Montgomery
- Nevada
- Newton
- Ouachita
- Perry
- Phillips
- Pike
- Poinsett
- Polk
- Pope
- Prairie
- Pulaski (Little Rock)
- Randolph
- St. Francis
- Saline
- Scott
- Searcy
- Sebastian
- Sevier
- Sharp
- Stone
- Union
- Van Buren
- Washington
- White
- Woodruff
- Yell

This National Park Service list is complete through NPS recent listings posted June 19, 2026.

== Current listings ==
	Name on the Register	Image	Date listed	Location	City or town	Description
1	Arkansas City Commercial District	Arkansas City Commercial District	February 18, 1999 (#99000227)	Roughly along the junction of Desoto Ave. and Sprague St. 33°36′19″N 91°12′13″W	Arkansas City	
2	Arkansas City High School	Arkansas City High School	October 4, 1984 (#84000005)	Robert S. Moore and President Sts. 33°36′36″N 91°12′05″W	Arkansas City	
3	Dante House		January 23, 2020 (#100004905)	501 Court St. 33°52′56″N 91°29′18″W	Dumas	
4	Desha County Courthouse	Desha County Courthouse	July 12, 1976 (#76000403)	Robert S. Moore Ave. 33°36′33″N 91°12′08″W	Arkansas City	
5	Dickinson-Moore House	Dickinson-Moore House	February 1, 2011 (#10001192)	707 Robert S. Moore Ave. 33°36′31″N 91°12′10″W	Arkansas City	
6	Dumas Commercial Historic District	Dumas Commercial Historic District	May 22, 2007 (#07000446)	S. Main St. between Choctaw and Waterman Sts. 33°53′22″N 91°29′32″W	Dumas	
7	Hubert & Ionia Furr House	Hubert & Ionia Furr House	February 4, 2011 (#10001197)	702 Desoto Ave. 33°36′24″N 91°12′04″W	Arkansas City	
8	Kemp Cotton Gin Historic District	Kemp Cotton Gin Historic District	June 1, 2005 (#05000491)	County Road 227 west of Highway 1; 33°45′48″N 91°16′36″W	Rohwer	
9	Jay Lewis House	Jay Lewis House	January 20, 2005 (#04001501)	12 Fairview Dr. 33°38′13″N 91°24′33″W	McGehee	
10	McGehee City Jail	McGehee City Jail	January 21, 2011 (#10001149)	Southwest corner of S. First St. and Pine St. 33°37′37″N 91°23′45″W	McGehee	
11	McGehee National Guard Armory	McGehee National Guard Armory	May 31, 2006 (#06000441)	1610 S. 1st St. 33°36′48″N 91°23′04″W	McGehee	
12	McGehee Post Office	McGehee Post Office	January 19, 2010 (#09001245)	201 N. Second St. 33°37′44″N 91°23′50″W	McGehee	
13	McKennon-Shea House	McKennon-Shea House	June 8, 1993 (#93000485)	206 Waterman St. 33°53′13″N 91°29′39″W	Dumas	
14	Merchants & Farmers Bank	Merchants & Farmers Bank	December 22, 1982 (#82000809)	Waterman and Main Sts. 33°53′15″N 91°29′29″W	Dumas	
15	Missouri Pacific Railroad Depot-McGehee	Missouri Pacific Railroad Depot-McGehee	June 11, 1992 (#92000616)	Railroad St. 33°37′42″N 91°23′42″W	McGehee	
16	Missouri Pacific Railway Van Noy Eating House	Missouri Pacific Railway Van Noy Eating House	January 24, 2011 (#10001154)	Southeast of the Seamans Dr. and Railroad St. intersection 33°37′41″N 91°23′42″W	McGehee	
17	Mound Cemetery	Mound Cemetery	January 24, 2008 (#07001426)	0.5 miles north of Arkansas City on County Road 351; 33°37′13″N 91°12′03″W	Arkansas City	
18	Old Piney Cemetery		October 11, 2022 (#100008278)	US 278, approx. 2.7 miles (4.3 km) west of jct. with Cty. Rd. 74, 1/8 mi. north of US 287; 33°38′43″N 91°38′48″W	Monticello	
19	Parnell-Sharpe House	Parnell-Sharpe House	September 28, 1989 (#89001594)	302 N. 2nd St. 33°37′51″N 91°23′52″W	McGehee	
20	R.A. Pickens II House		May 29, 2019 (#100003992)	1 Pickens Pl. 33°50′38″N 91°28′53″W	Pickens	
21	Xenophon Overton Pindall Law Office	Xenophon Overton Pindall Law Office	May 10, 1999 (#98000832)	Junction of Capitol and Kate Adams Sts. 33°36′22″N 91°12′11″W	Arkansas City	
22	Rohwer Relocation Center Memorial Cemetery	Rohwer Relocation Center Memorial Cemetery	July 6, 1992 (#92001882)	Highway 1; 33°45′59″N 91°16′49″W	Rohwer	
23	Rohwer Relocation Center Site	Rohwer Relocation Center Site	July 30, 1974 (#74000474)	Highway 1; 33°45′58″N 91°16′34″W	Rohwer	
24	Temple Meir Chayim	Temple Meir Chayim	April 22, 1999 (#99000470)	Junction of 4th and Holly Sts. 33°37′43″N 91°23′59″W	McGehee	
25	Thane House	Thane House	December 22, 1982 (#82000810)	Levy and 1st Sts. 33°36′26″N 91°11′59″W	Arkansas City	
26	Trippe Holly Grove Cemetery	Trippe Holly Grove Cemetery	June 25, 1999 (#99000729)	Highway 4 or Crooked Bayou Rd., approximately 2 miles south of McGehee; 33°36′07″N 91°20′53″W	McGehee	
27	Dr. J.D. Watts House	Dr. J.D. Watts House	December 9, 1994 (#94001460)	205 W. Choctaw; 33°53′17″N 91°29′39″W	Dumas	

== See also ==
- List of National Historic Landmarks in Arkansas
- National Register of Historic Places listings in Arkansas
