= Dumas Commercial Historic District =

Historic district in Arkansas, United States

- U.S. National Register of Historic Places
- U.S. Historic district
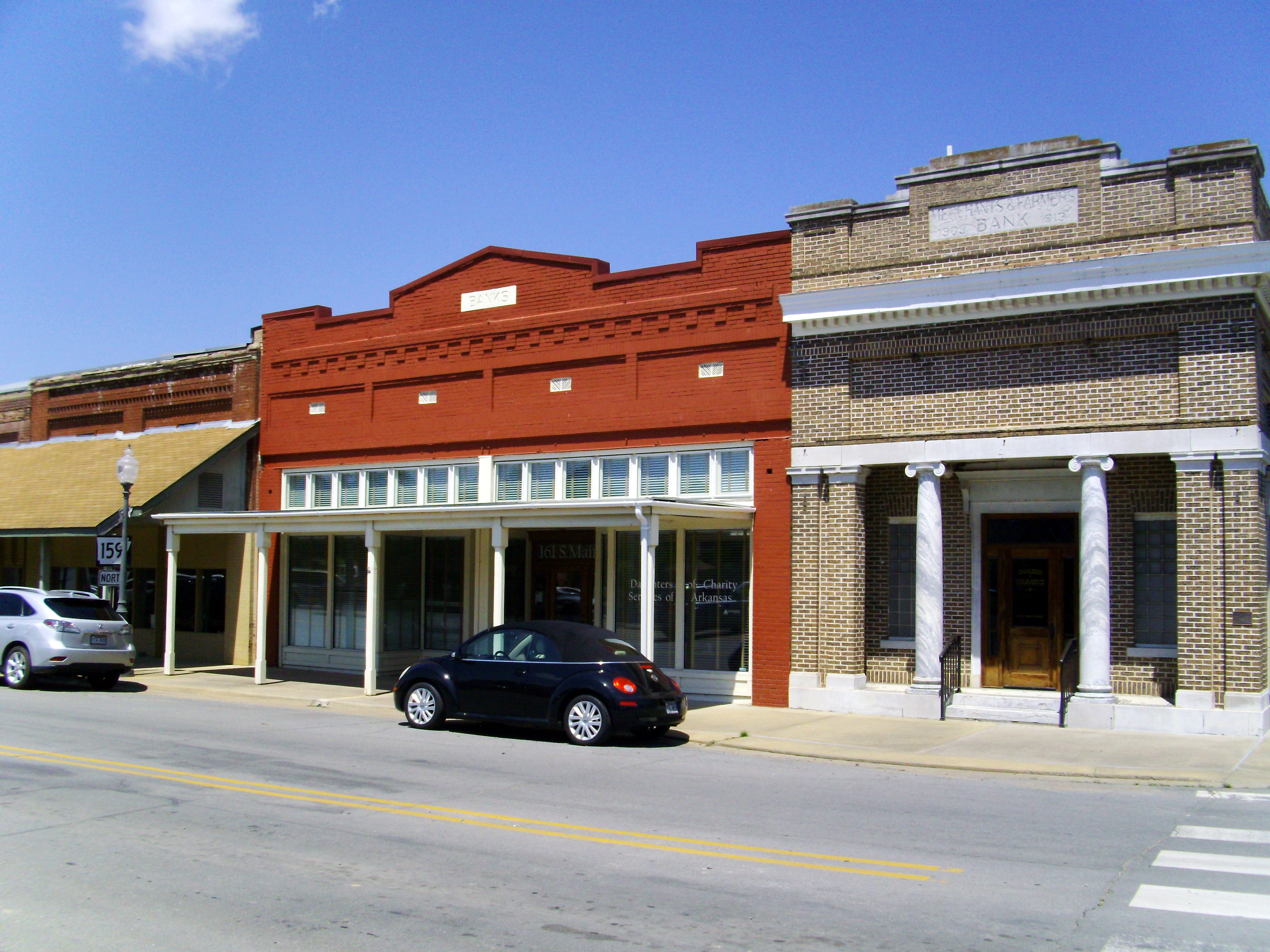
- Downtown Dumas

- Location within Arkansas Location within the United States
- Location: South Main St. bet. Choctaw and Waterman Sts., Dumas, Arkansas
- Coordinates: 33°53′22″N 91°29′32″W
- Area: 6 acres (2.4 ha)
- Built: 1905
- Architectural style: Colonial Revival, Early Commercial
- NRHP reference No.: 07000446
- Added to NRHP: May 22, 2007

The Dumas Commercial Historic District encompasses the historic commercial heart of the rural community of Dumas, Arkansas, United States, in the Mississippi River delta region of southeastern Arkansas. The town of Dumas was established in 1904, after the St. Louis, Iron Mountain and Southern Railway was built through the farm of William Dumas. The town's oldest surviving commercial building, the Porter Grocery, was one of several built by David Porter between 1905 and 1938. The historic district includes eight noteworthy buildings, including the Merchants & Farmers Bank building, a Colonial Revival National Register-listed building designed by Charles L. Thompson. All of the buildings occupy a single city block of South Main Street, between Choctaw and Waterman Streets. Most of the buildings of interest were built in the 1920s, and are vernacular brick commercial buildings.

The district was listed on the National Register of Historic Places in 2007.

== See also ==
- National Register of Historic Places listings in Desha County, Arkansas
