= Arkansas Highway 169 =

State highway in Arkansas, United States

Highway 169

Route information
- Maintained by ArDOT
- Existed: c. 1936-1937–present

Section 1
- Length: 7.82 mi (12.59 km)
- South end: Sulphur Springs
- Major intersections: US 82 in Crossett
- North end: Hancock Road in Crossett

Section 2
- Length: 1.27 mi (2.04 km)
- South end: AR 4 in McGehee
- North end: US 65 / US 165 in McGehee

Section 3
- Length: 2.21 mi (3.56 km)
- South end: US 165 near Gillett
- North end: Arkansas Post

Location
- Country: United States
- State: Arkansas
- Counties: Arkansas, Ashley, Desha

Highway system
- Arkansas Highway System; Interstate; US; State; Business; Spurs; Suffixed; Scenic; Heritage
← AR 168	→ AR 170

Highway 169 (AR 169, Ark. 169, and Hwy. 169) is a designation for three state highways in Southeast Arkansas. One route of 7.82 miles (12.59 km) begins at Sulphur Springs and runs northeast to Hancock Road in Crossett. A second route of 1.27 miles (2.04 km) in McGehee begins at Highway 4 and runs east to US Highway 65/US Highway 165 (US 65/US 165). A third route of 2.21 miles (3.56 km) begins at US 165 and runs east to Arkansas Post. All routes are maintained by the Arkansas Department of Transportation (ArDOT).

== Route description ==
=== Sulphur Springs to Crossett ===
Highway 169 begins at Sulphur Springs in southwestern Ashley County just over 4 miles (6.4 km) from the Louisiana state line. The route runs northeast to Crossett, passing through an industrial section of town. Continuing north, the route intersects and overlaps US 82 at a brief officially designated exception heading west. At Hancock Road, Highway 169 turns north and runs along the west side of a large Georgia-Pacific paper mill. State maintenance ends, with the roadway continuing north at Hancock Road.

=== McGehee ===
Highway 169 begins at Highway 4 in the southeastern part of McGehee near the McGehee Cemetery. The route curves northwest to US 65/US 165, where it terminates.

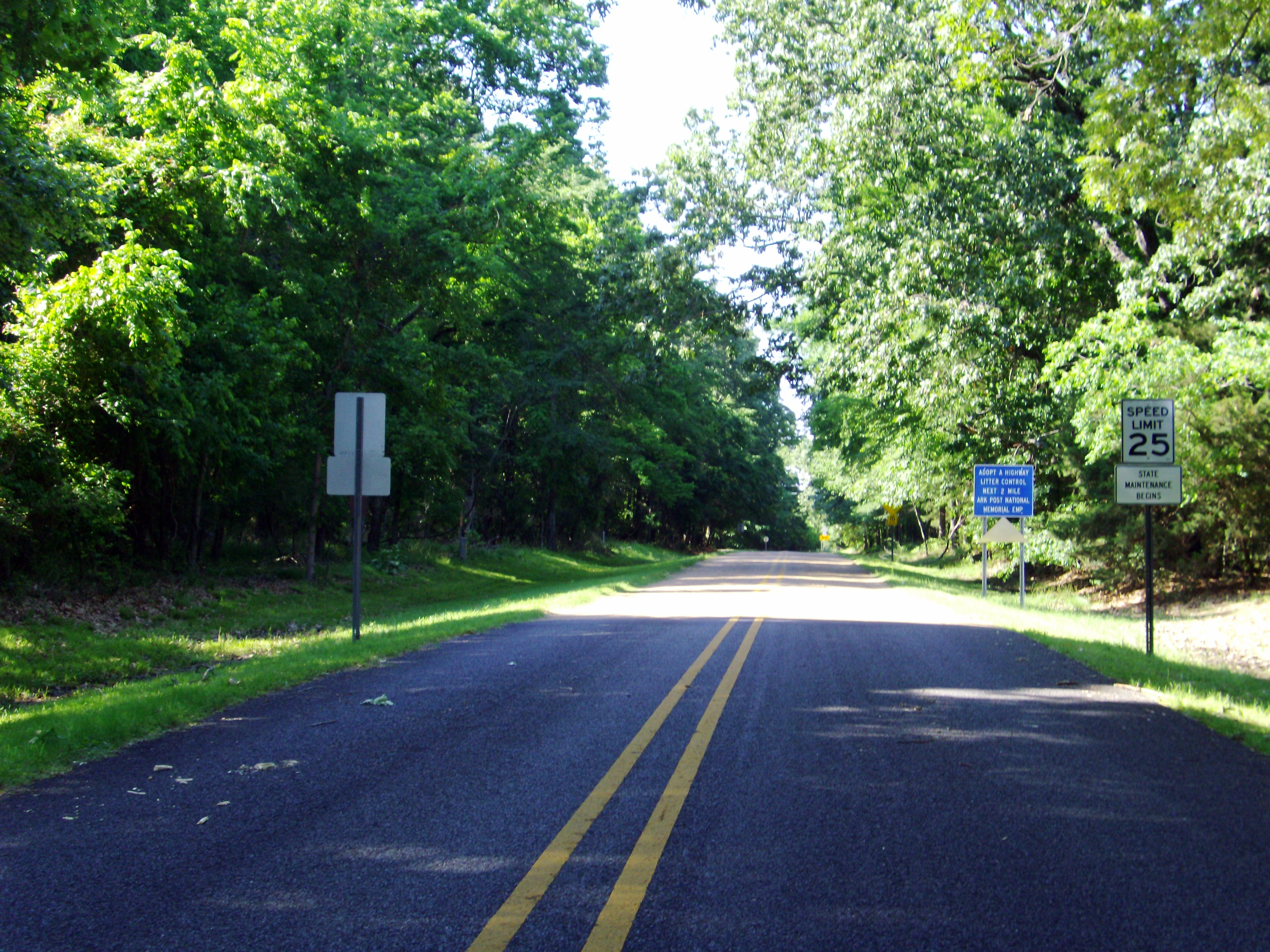
Highway 169 begins near Arkansas Post

=== US 165 to Arkansas Post ===
The route begins at US 165 in southern Arkansas County near the Arkansas River. Highway 169 runs east toward Moore Bayou, serving the Moore Bayou Use Area owned by the Arkansas Game and Fish Commission. Continuing east, the route bridges Little Post Bayou and enters Arkansas Post National Memorial. State maintenance terminates near the location of the first established European settlement in Arkansas, settled in 1868 when the area was under French dominion as French Louisiana. Arkansas Post served as the capitol of Arkansas Territory and was an important trading post in early Arkansas history.

== History ==
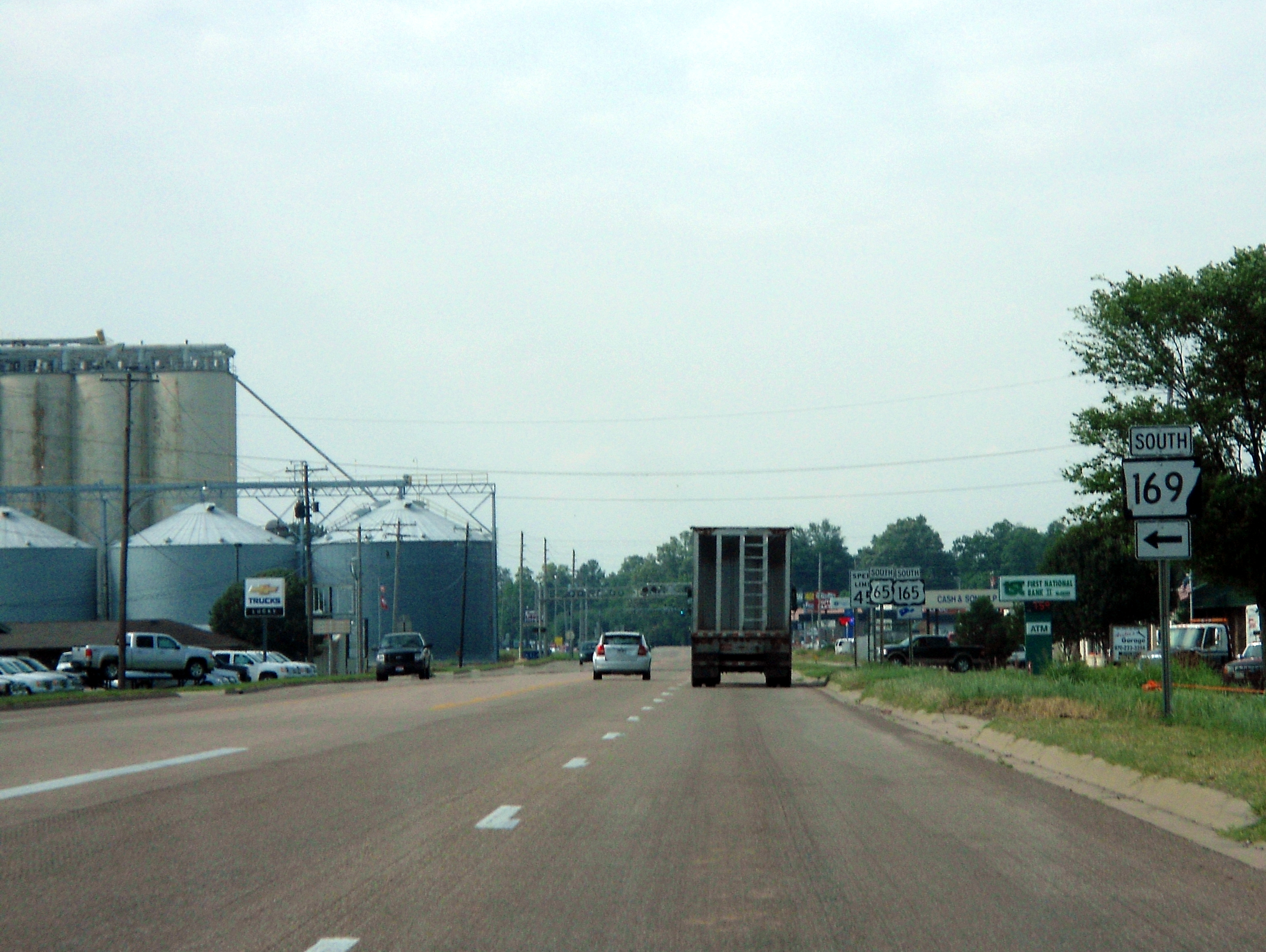
Highway 169 northern terminus at US 65/US 165 in McGehee

The highway was created between 1936 and 1937 as a connection between State Road 1 and Arkansas Post. The second section of Highway 169 was created in Crossett on July 18, 1985. The route was designated to provide access to the state highway system for an industrial facility. The Crossett route was extended south on February 18, 1998, supplanting one of the three sections of Highway 278 (because US 278 was extended into Arkansas). The third section of Highway 169 was created on September 27, 2000, by supplanting a short section of Highway 4 in order to reduce confusion.

== Major intersections ==
County	Location	mi	km	Destinations	Notes
Ashley	Sulphur Springs	0.00	0.00	Begin state maintenance	Southern terminus
Ashley	Crossett	6.79– 6.98	10.93– 11.23	US 82 – Crossett, Strong	officially designated exception
Ashley	Crossett	7.82	12.59	Hancock Road	Northern terminus
Gap in route
Desha	McGehee	0.00	0.00	AR 4 (Crooked Bayou Drive) – Arkansas City	Southern terminus
Desha	McGehee	1.27	2.04	US 65 / US 165 – Dumas, Lake Village	Northern terminus
Gap in route
Arkansas		0.00	0.00	Arkansas Post	Southern terminus
Arkansas		2.21	3.56	US 165 – DeWitt, Dumas	Eastern terminus
1.000 mi = 1.609 km; 1.000 km = 0.621 mi: Concurrency terminus

== Former route ==
Highway 169
- Location: US 79 in Humphrey to Highway 13
- Length: 4.9 mi (7.9 km)
- Existed: March 28, 1973–June 22, 1977

Highway 169 (AR 169, Ark. 169, and Hwy. 169) is a former state highway of 4.9 miles (7.9 km) in Southeast Arkansas.

=== Route description ===
The route began at US 79 in Humphrey and ran to Highway 13.

=== History ===
A second segment of Highway 169 was created between Humphrey and the Arkansas/Jefferson county line on March 28, 1973 pursuant to Act 9 of 1973 by the Arkansas General Assembly at the request of the Arkansas County Judge. The act directed county judges and legislators to designate up to 12 miles (19 km) of county roads as state highways in each county. This request came during a time when Arkansas State Highway Commission was seeking to close gaps in the state highway system. Since the Arkansas County section left a 0.8 miles (1.3 km) gap between the end of Highway 169 and Highway 13 in Jefferson County, the ASHC extended the request to Highway 13. The entire route was supplanted by a rerouted Highway 13 on June 22, 1977.

=== Major intersections ===
County	Location	mi	km	Destinations	Notes
Arkansas	Humphrey	0.0	0.0	US 79 – Stuttgart, Pine Bluff	Southern terminus
Jefferson		4.9	7.9	AR 13 – Humnoke	Northern terminus
1.000 mi = 1.609 km; 1.000 km = 0.621 mi
