= Dr. J.D. Watts House =

Historic house in Arkansas, United States

- Dr. J. D. Watts House
- U.S. National Register of Historic Places
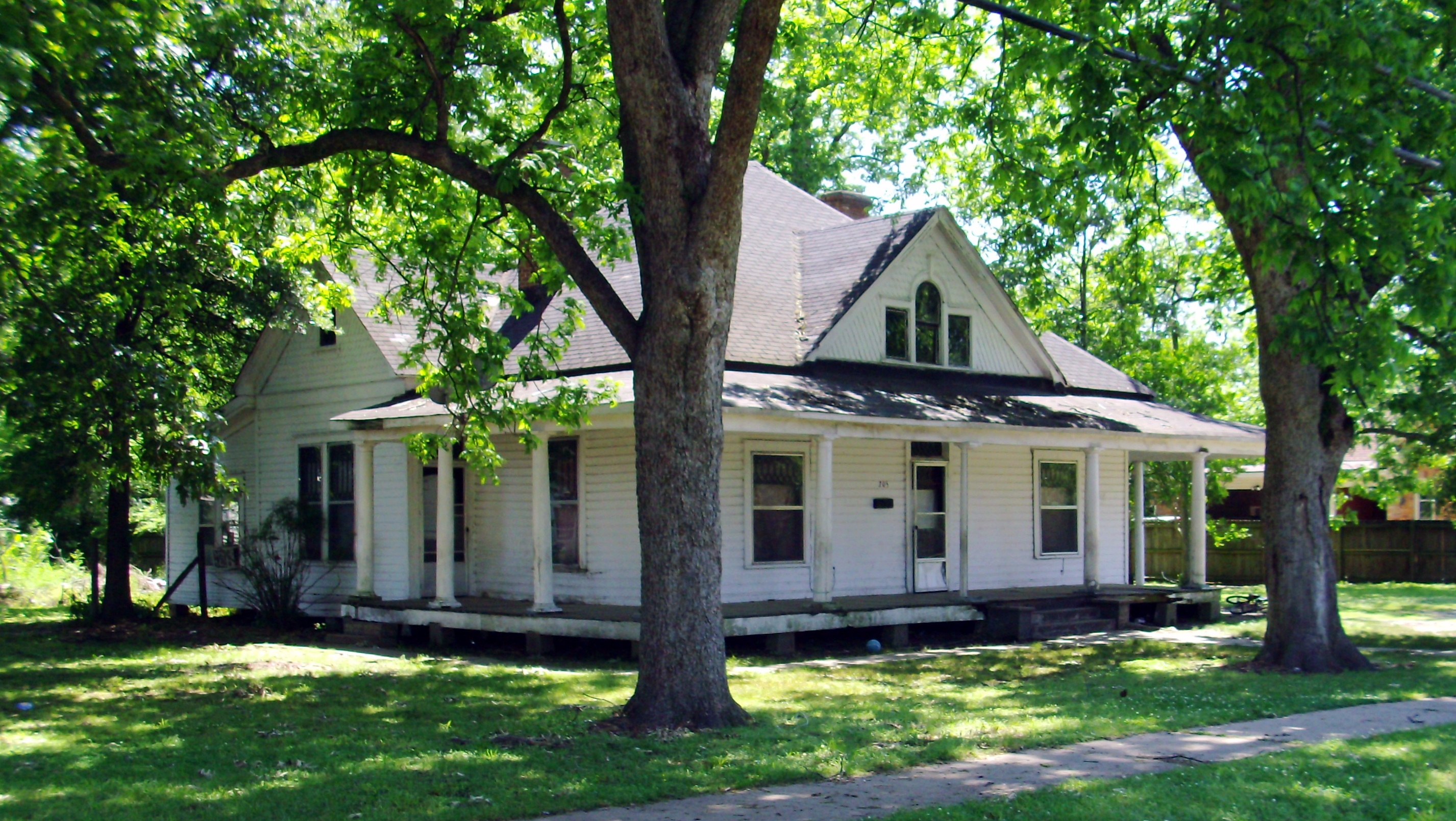

- Location within Arkansas Location within the United States
- Location: 205 W. Choctaw, Dumas, Arkansas
- Coordinates: 33°53′17″N 91°29′39″W
- Area: 1 acre (0.40 ha)
- Architectural style: Queen Anne, Colonial Revival
- NRHP reference No.: 94001460
- Added to NRHP: December 9, 1994

The Dr. J.D. Watts House is a historic house located at 205 West Choctaw Street in Dumas, Arkansas. It is a well preserved local example of a transitional Queen Anne/Colonial Revival residence.

== Description and history ==
The 1 1/2-story timber-framed house was built around 1909 by a Mr. Williams, and was purchased by Dr. James David Watts in 1918, when he moved to the area. It has a hip roof, with cross-gable dormers on the sides and rear, and a large projecting gable-end dormer centered on the front facade. This dormer features a Palladian window, with the surrounding walls covered in diamond-cut and fish-scale shingles. The gable itself is decorated with jigsaw-cut boards. There is a single story porch, supported by Tuscan columns, that wraps around both sides of the house. The front entry is flanked by sidelight windows and pilasters supporting an entablature.

The house was listed on the National Register of Historic Places on December 9, 1994.

== See also ==
- National Register of Historic Places listings in Desha County, Arkansas
