= Temple Meir Chayim =

Historic former Reform synagogue in McGehee, Arkansas, US

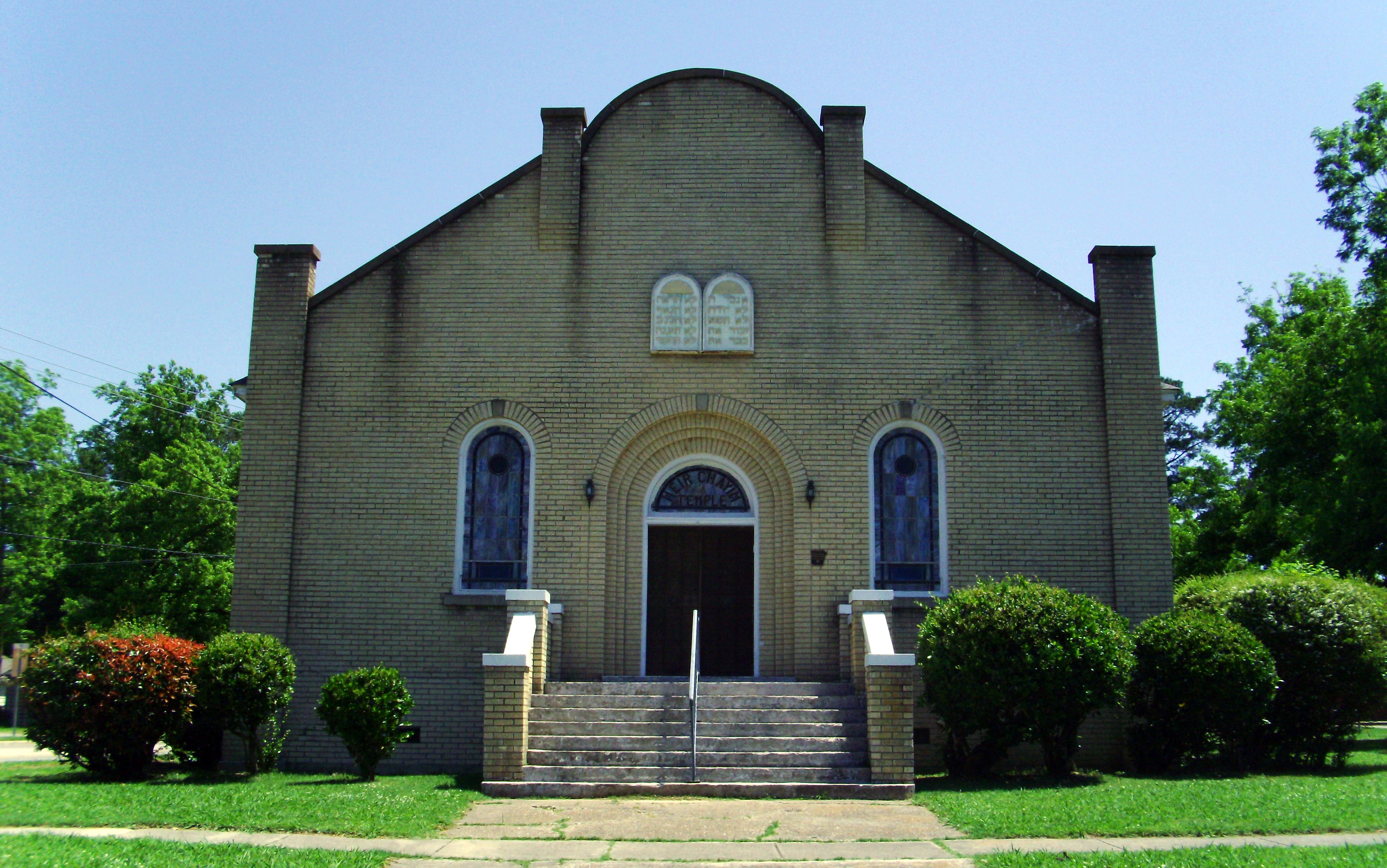
- Temple Meir Chayim, in 2014, whilst still in use

- Location of the former synagogue in Arkansas

Religion
- Affiliation: Reform Judaism (former)
- Ecclesiastical or organizational status: Synagogue (1947–2016)
- Status: Closed

Location
- Location: Junction of 4th and Holly Streets, McGehee, Desha County, Arkansas
- Country: United States
- Interactive map of Temple Meir Chayim
- Coordinates: 33°37′43″N 91°23′59″W

Architecture
- Type: Synagogue
- Style: Romanesque Revival
- Established: 1946 (as a congregation)
- Completed: 1947

Specifications
- Capacity: 150 worshipers
- Materials: Brick
- Temple Meir Chayim
- U.S. National Register of Historic Places
- Area: less than one acre
- MPS: Ethnic and Racial Minority Settlement of the Arkansas Delta MPS
- NRHP reference No.: 99000470
- Added to NRHP: April 22, 1999

Temple Meir Chayim is a historic former Reform Jewish congregation and synagogue, located at 4th and Holly Streets in McGehee, Arkansas, in the United States. The building operated as a synagogue between 1947 and 2016; and was listed on the National Register of Historic Places in 1999.

== History ==
The Reform congregation was founded in 1946 as Beth Chayim (transliterated from Hebrew as "House of Life") that was started by a local chapter of B'nai B'rith, founded in 1927 in Desha County. The congregation was renamed as Meir Chayim shortly thereafter to honor a local resident, Sergeant Herbert M. Abowitz.

By the latter part of the 20th-century, the Jewish population tended to migrate away from small towns in Arkansas towards larger cities, impacting Meir Chayim. By 1984, Meir Chayim served a community of less than one hundred Jews over a 1,200-square-mile (3,100 km^{2}) area. Membership had fallen to approximately twenty families by that time, with only four Jewish children attending religious school in Greenville, Mississippi; and by 2007 it was less than fifteen families. In 2016, the remaining members of the congregation decided to sell the building and the synagogue was deconsecrated the same year.

The proceeds of the sale of the synagogue building were used to establish a scholarship program for Jewish students, administered by B'nai Israel in Little Rock.

== Architecture ==
Whilst the two-story brick building was built in 1947 to serve the Jewish community of McGehee, Dermott, and Eudora, the official dedication did not take place until 1949. Designed by the congregation's committee, the building style is a restrained Romanesque Revival with Mission details. It was the first synagogue in southeastern Arkansas, even though there had been a Jewish presence in the area since the early 19th century.

The buff brick building has a round-arched entrance set into the plain buff brick façade. On each side of the double-door entrance is a stained glass window, and above it is a tablet with the Ten Commandments. The facade is finished with a rounded gable, and simple pilasters mark the corners and rise above the line of the gable roof.

Whilst an active synagogue, the building was listed on the National Register of Historic Places on April 22, 1999.

== See also ==
- List of synagogues in the United States
- National Register of Historic Places listings in Desha County, Arkansas
