= McGehee National Guard Armory =

- U.S. National Register of Historic Places
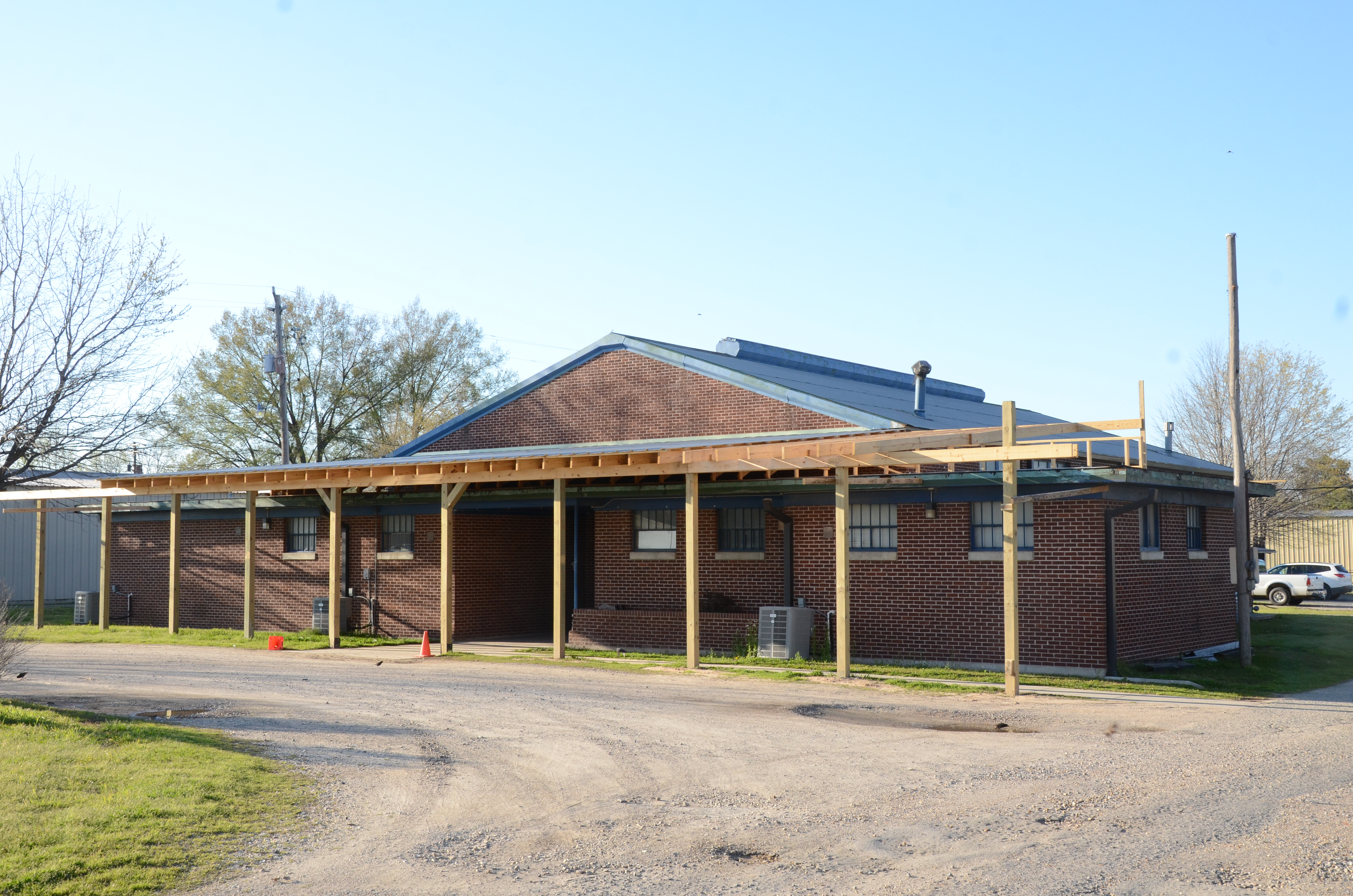

- Location within Arkansas Location within the United States
- Location: 1610 S. First St., McGehee, Arkansas
- Coordinates: 33°36′48″N 91°23′4″W
- Area: 1 acre (0.40 ha)
- Built: 1954
- Built by: Townsend Construction Co.
- Architectural style: Plain/Traditional
- NRHP reference No.: 06000441
- Added to NRHP: May 31, 2006

The McGehee National Guard Armory is a historic armory building at 1610 South First Street in McGehee, Arkansas. The armory, built in 1954, is a single story cinder block building faced in brick veneer. The metal gable roof is supported by a steel frame, with clerestory awning windows on either side. The large central area is surrounded on three sides by single story flat-roofed sections housing offices, kitchen space, and other support areas. The design of the building is typical of those produced by the Arkansas National Guard at that time. The building was used by the National Guard until 2005, and was given to the city the following year.

The building was listed on the National Register of Historic Places in 2006.

== See also ==
- National Register of Historic Places listings in Desha County, Arkansas
