= Trippe Holly Grove Cemetery =

Historic cemetery in Arkansas, United States

- U.S. National Register of Historic Places
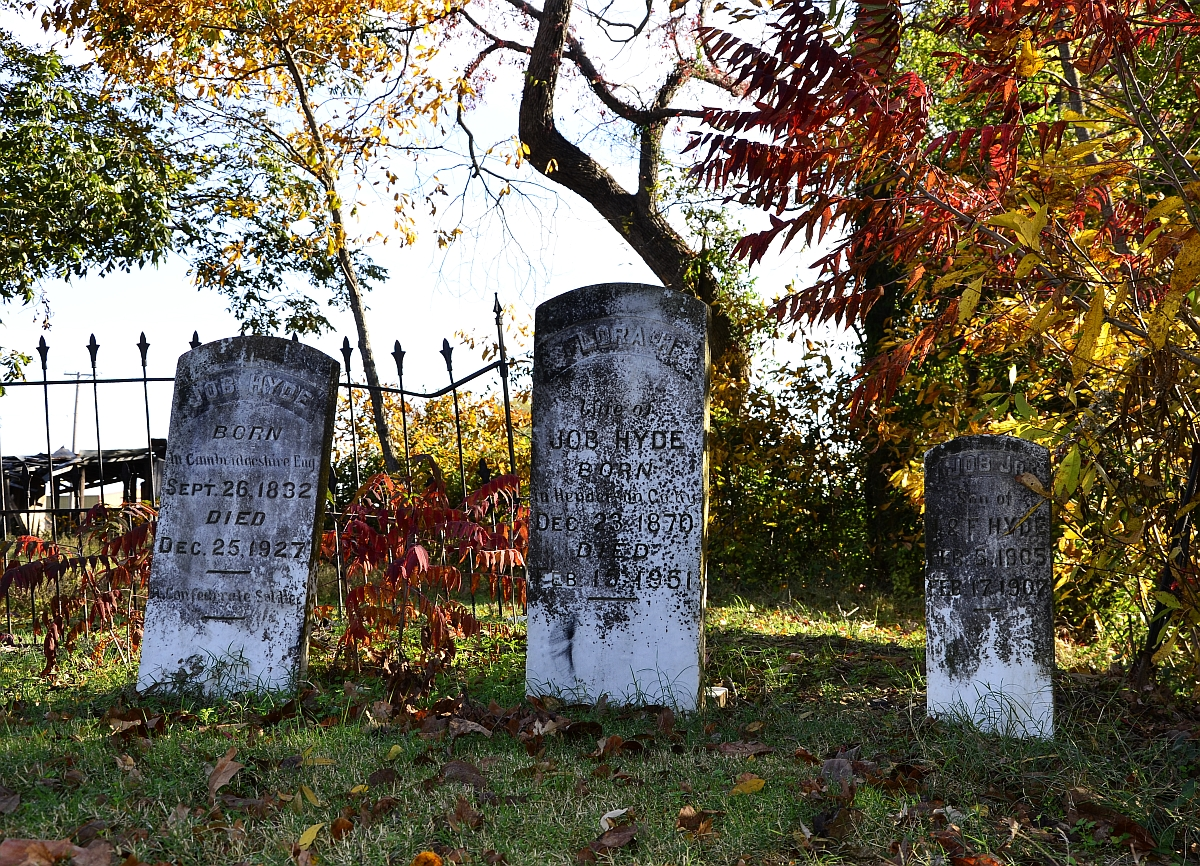
- Holly Grove Cemetery in 2012

- Location within Arkansas Location within the United States
- Nearest city: McGehee, Arkansas
- Coordinates: 33°36′7″N 91°20′53″W
- Area: 2 acres (0.81 ha)
- NRHP reference No.: 99000729
- Added to NRHP: June 25, 1999

Holly Grove Cemetery is a historic cemetery, located on the south side of Crooked Bayou Drive, 3 miles (4.8 km) southeast of McGehee, Arkansas. The cemetery is the only surviving remnant of the community of Trippe Junction, established in 1857 by the families of William Fletcher Trippe and his brother-in-law Benjamin McGehee. A railroad spur line was constructed to the area in 1877, and a small town grew up around it. By the 1920s all of its businesses had failed, and by 1930 all but one building had succumbed to fire. The Holly Grove Methodist Church adjoined the cemetery, and was the site of many funeral services. The church was serving as a school when it burned in 1913. In 1958, a group of citizens raised money to assist with maintenance and upkeep of the cemetery. A bicentennial marker was erected by the Desha Historical Society in 1974. The southern section of the cemetery was listed on the National Register of Historic Places in 1999.

The cemetery is composed of two sections, as it is divided by Arkansas Highway 4. The northern section continues to be used for burials, while the southern section is the location of 90 historic graves. It is bounded by a golf course on the west, a pasture to the east, and Crooked Bayou to the south. Its entrance is marked by the bicentennial marker, and there is a narrow dirt road forming a U shape providing vehicular access through the grounds. The oldest grave is that of Benjamin Scott McGehee, an infant who lived one month in 1862. Many graves are of immigrants born in Europe. Claude W. James, who owned several businesses in Trippe Junction and rode with Theodore Roosevelt and his Rough Riders, is interred here.

== See also ==
- National Register of Historic Places listings in Desha County, Arkansas
