= McGehee City Jail =

- U.S. National Register of Historic Places
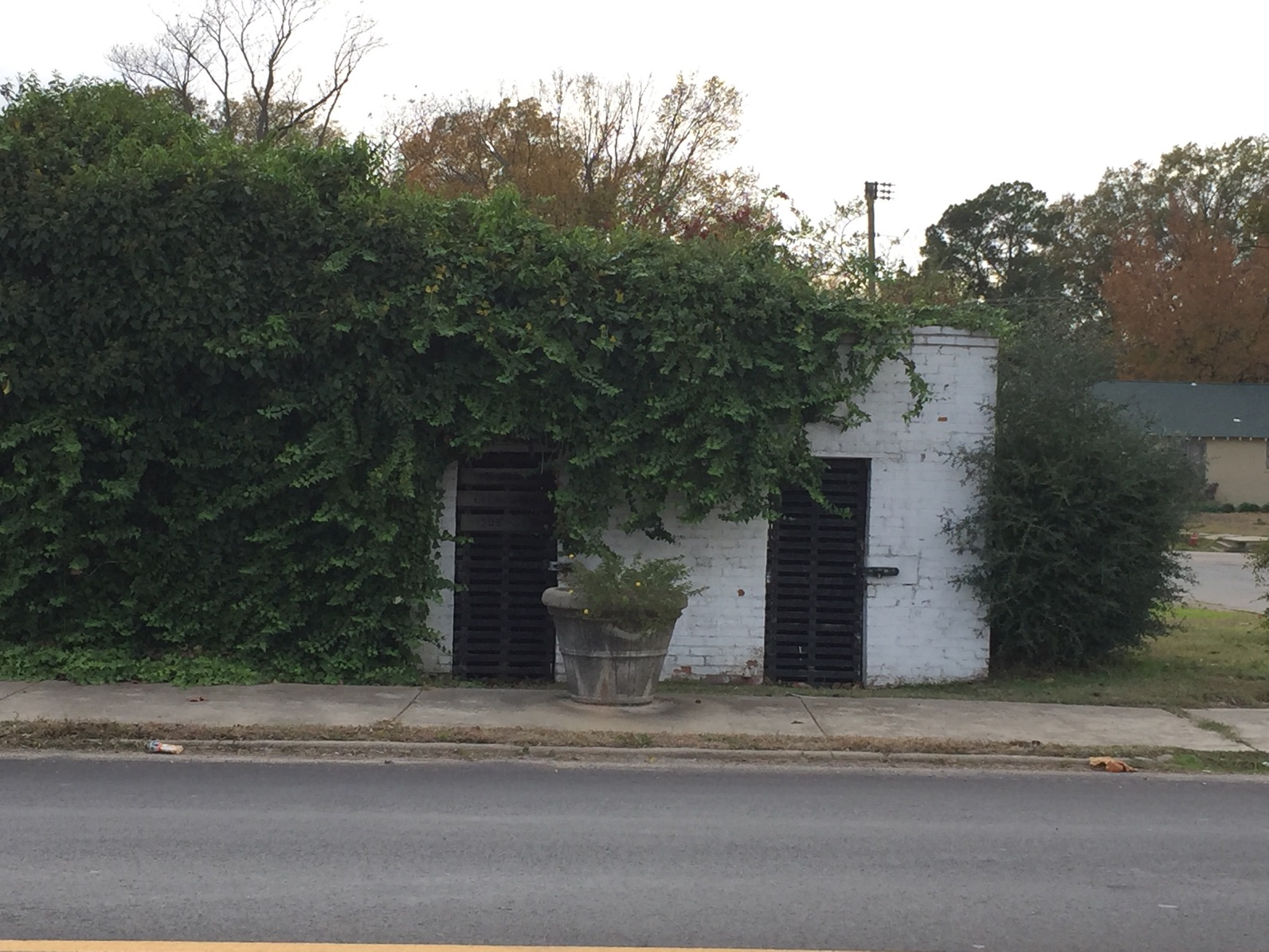

- Location within Arkansas Location within the United States
- Location: Southwest corner of S. First St. and Pine St., McGehee, Arkansas
- Coordinates: 33°37′37″N 91°23′45″W
- Area: 1 acre (0.40 ha)
- Built: 1908
- Architectural style: Plain/Traditional
- NRHP reference No.: 10001149
- Added to NRHP: January 21, 2011

The former McGehee City Jail is a historic building at South First and Pine Streets in McGehee, Arkansas. The small, single-story brick building was built in 1908, and served as the city jail until 1935. The building's roof is made of concrete, and it has three cells, each with a separate outside door. All openings in the building are covered with heavy metal bars, and the doors are solid metal. Even though this building has sat vacant since 1935, it has survived the jail that was built to replace it.

The building was listed on the National Register of Historic Places in 2011.

== See also ==
- National Register of Historic Places listings in Desha County, Arkansas
