= Missouri Pacific Railway Van Noy Eating House =

- U.S. National Register of Historic Places
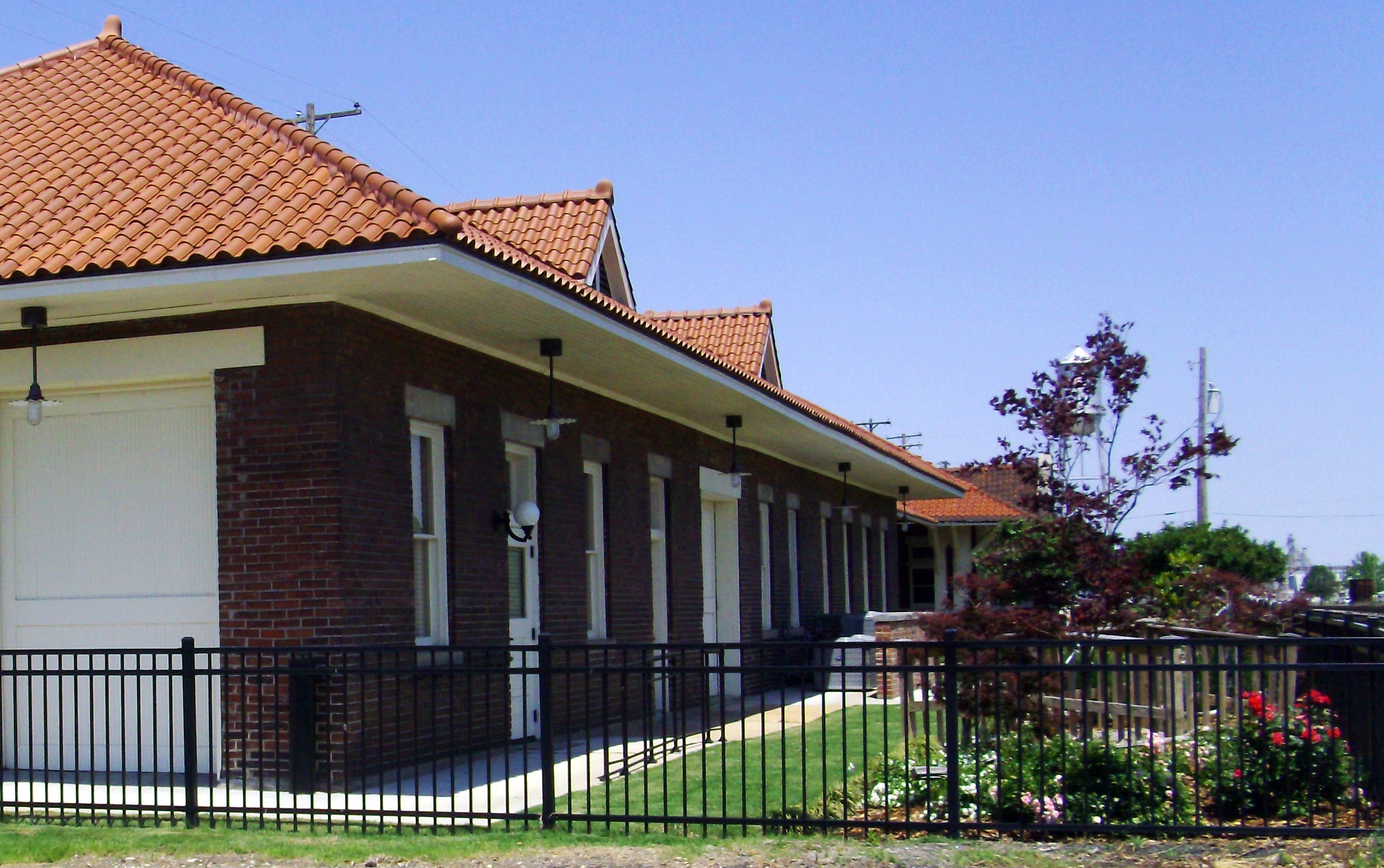

- Location within Arkansas Location within the United States
- Location: Southeast of Seamans Drive and Railroad Street, McGehee, Arkansas
- Coordinates: 33°37′41″N 91°23′42″W
- Area: less than one acre
- Built: c. 1910
- Built by: Missouri Pacific Railway
- Architectural style: Plain-Traditional
- NRHP reference No.: 10001154
- Added to NRHP: January 24, 2011

The Missouri Pacific Railway Van Noy Eating House is a historic restaurant building at the corner of Seamans Drive and Railroad Street in McGehee, Arkansas, US. The single-story brick building was constructed c. 1910 by the Missouri Pacific Railroad, and housed a dining establishment operated by the Van Noy Railway News and Hotel Company. It is one of a small number of such buildings to survive in the state. The building was divided into three parts: a central kitchen served a lunch counter area on one side and a dining room on the other. The establishment closed in 1948.

The house was listed on the National Register of Historic Places in 2011.

== See also ==
- National Register of Historic Places listings in Desha County, Arkansas
