= McGehee Post Office =

- U.S. National Register of Historic Places
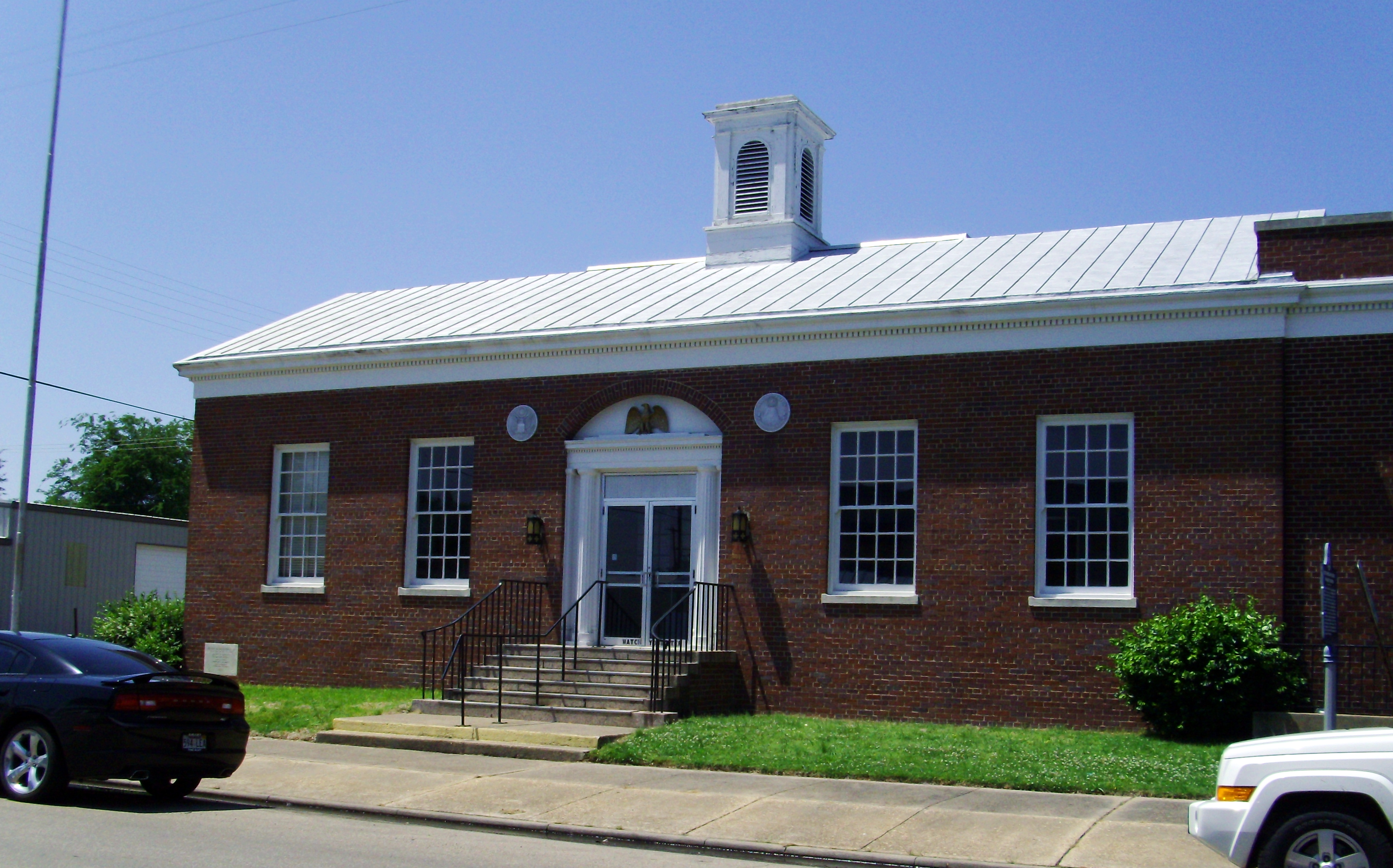

- Location within Arkansas Location within the United States
- Location: 201 N. Second St., McGehee, Arkansas
- Coordinates: 33°37′50″N 91°23′51″W
- Area: less than one acre
- Built: 1937
- Built by: Neal Meleck
- Architect: Office of the Supervising Architect under Louis A. Simon
- Architectural style: Colonial Revival
- NRHP reference No.: 09001245
- Added to NRHP: January 19, 2010

The former McGehee Post Office building is a historic post office facility at 201 North Second Street in McGehee, Arkansas. The

single story masonry building was designed by the Office of the Supervising Architect under Louis A. Simon, and built in 1937. A Colonial Revival building, it features a cupola with round-arch louvered vents, and a front entry that is flanked by Doric columns supporting a cornice with a golden eagle. The building served as a post office until 1999, after which it was purchased by the McGehee Industrial Foundation.

The building was listed on the National Register of Historic Places in 2010.

== See also ==
- National Register of Historic Places listings in Desha County, Arkansas
