= Charles McPherson =

Charles McPherson may refer to:

- Charles McPherson (musician) (born 1939), jazz saxophonist

- Charles McPherson (album), recorded in 1971

- Charles Duncan McPherson (1877–1970), cabinet minister in Manitoba
- Charles Robert McPherson (born 1926), senior pastor of the Riverside Church in Denver

== See also ==
- Charles Macpherson Dobell (1869–1954), Canadian general
