= R.A. Pickens II House =

Historic house in Arkansas, United States

- U.S. National Register of Historic Places
- Location within Arkansas Location within the United States
- Location: 1 Pickens Pl., Pickens, Arkansas
- Coordinates: 33°50′38″N 91°28′53″W
- Area: 3 acres (1.2 ha)
- Built: c. 1940
- Architect: R.A. Pickens II
- Architectural style: Colonial Revival
- NRHP reference No.: 100003992
- Added to NRHP: May 29, 2019

The R.A. Pickens II House is a historic house at 1 Pickens Place in Pickens, Desha County, Arkansas. It is a 2 1/2-story brick structure, with a side gable roof that projects over the front facade to form a porch supported by square wooden columns with Doric elements. The main entrance is centrally located, with a keystoned semicircular transom and matching sidelight windows. The house was built about 1940 using elements of the former Pickens plantation house, which had been built on the site in the 1880s. The Pickens family, which still owned the house in 2019, operated one of the largest plantations in Desha County. The house is one of the area's finest examples of Colonial Revival architecture.

The house was listed on the National Register of Historic Places in 2019.

== See also ==
- National Register of Historic Places listings in Desha County, Arkansas
