= Jay Lewis House =

Historic house in Arkansas, United States

- U.S. National Register of Historic Places
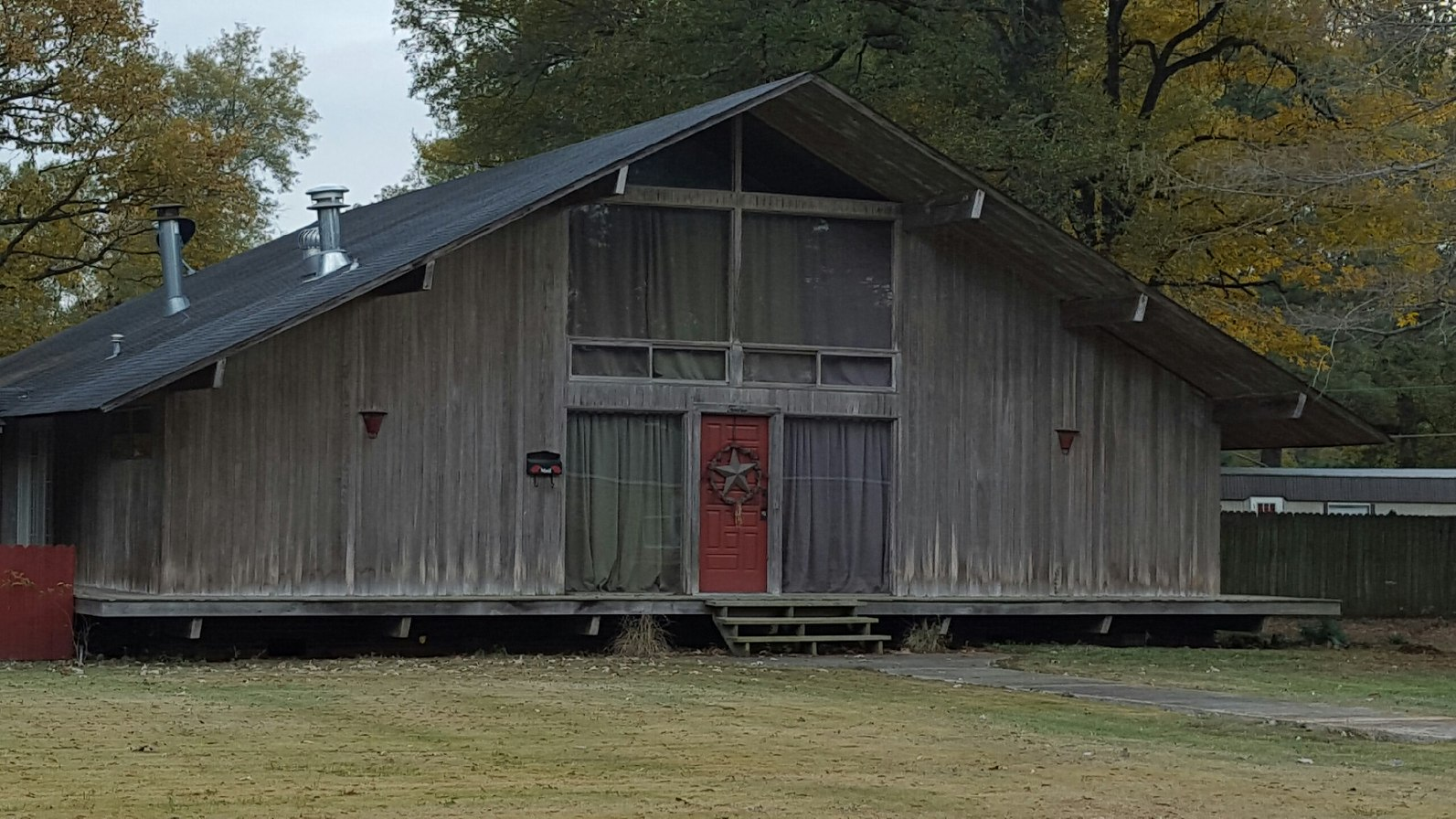

- Location within Arkansas Location within the United States
- Location: 12 Fairview Dr., McGehee, Arkansas
- Coordinates: 33°38′13″N 91°24′33″W
- Area: less than one acre
- Built: 1955
- Architect: Edward Durell Stone
- Architectural style: Modern Movement, regional
- NRHP reference No.: 04001501
- Added to NRHP: January 20, 2005

The Jay Lewis House is a historic house at 12 Fairview Drive in McGehee, Arkansas. The two story wood-frame house was built in 1955 to a design by Edward Durell Stone, an Arkansas native and a leading proponent of new formalism. It is the only Stone-designed house in Desha County, and one of only five in the state. The exterior of the house is clad in vertical cypress boards, with a porch that wraps completely around the house, and a breezeway connecting to a carport, built at the same time. The porch roof is supported by six Douglas fir beams. The interior of the house is based on Stone's modern reinterpretation of the traditional Arkansas dog trot form, with the central living/dining/kitchen area acting as the central element of that form. Other rooms of the house connect to this section, and are separated from it by Shōji screens. The house's basic design is similar to that of another house Stone designed in Englewood, New Jersey. The house is largely unchanged since its construction; one chimney has been replaced due to storm damage.

The house was listed on the National Register of Historic Places in 2005.

== See also ==
- National Register of Historic Places listings in Desha County, Arkansas
