= Nathaniel Pryor =

Nathaniel Pryor may refer to:

- Nathaniel Hale Pryor (1772–1831), served as sergeant in the Lewis and Clark Expedition
- Nathaniel Pryor (Los Angeles pioneer) (died 1850)
