= McKennon-Shea House =

Historic house in Arkansas, United States

- U.S. National Register of Historic Places
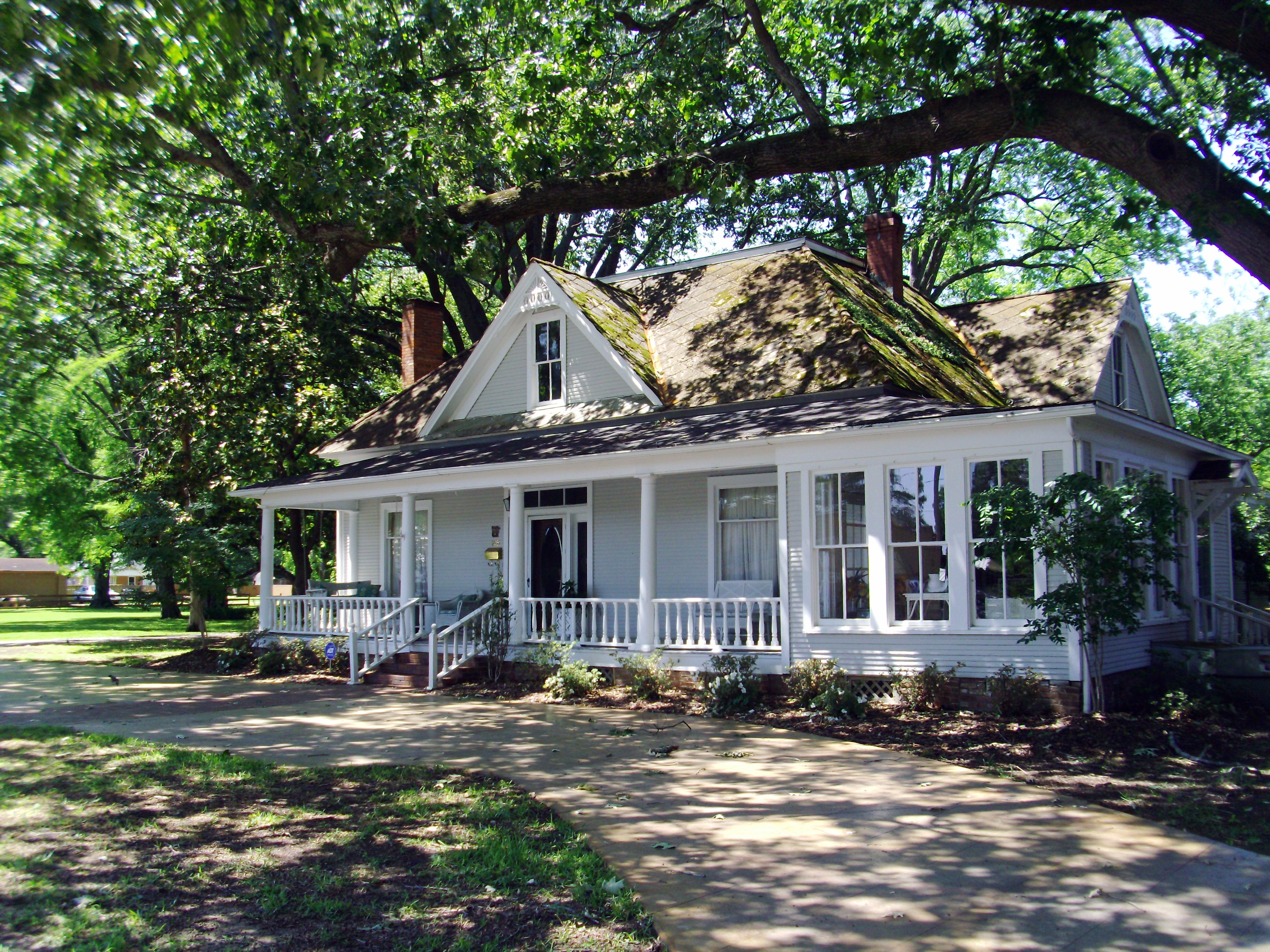

- Location within Arkansas Location within the United States
- Location: 206 Waterman St., Dumas, Arkansas
- Coordinates: 33°53′13″N 91°29′39″W
- Area: 1 acre (0.40 ha)
- Built by: Robert A. Culpepper
- Architectural style: Classical Revival, Vernacular, Folk Victorian
- NRHP reference No.: 93000485
- Added to NRHP: June 8, 1993

The McKennon-Shea House is a historic house at 206 Waterman Street in Dumas, Arkansas. The 1 1/2-story wood-frame house was built c. 1910, and bought in 1913 by Claude McKennon, a local entrepreneur who established a farm supply business in Dumas at about the same time, and built a real estate empire of farmland operated by tenant farmers. Mckennon's daughter Sarah married Thomas Shea, and their son inherited the property. The house is a vernacular rendering of Folk Victorian and Colonial Revival styling, with gingerbread decoration and four Tuscan columns supporting a central projecting gable.

The house was listed on the National Register of Historic Places in 1993.

== See also ==
- National Register of Historic Places listings in Desha County, Arkansas
