= Arkansas Post, Arkansas =

- Unincorporated community
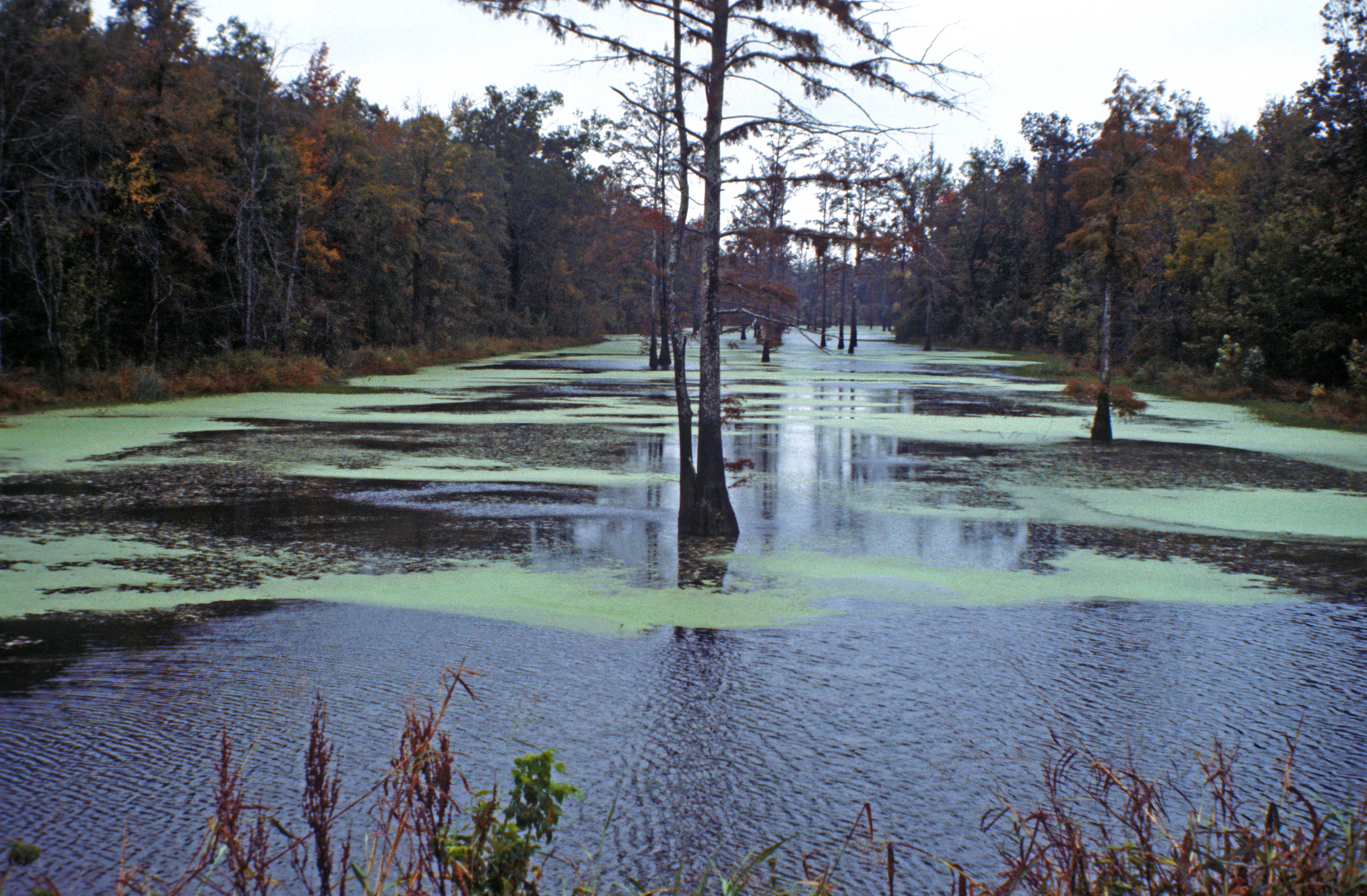
- Bayous around Arkansas Post

- Location in Arkansas
- Coordinates: 34°01′25″N 91°20′37″W
- Country: United States
- State: Arkansas
- County: Arkansas
- Township: Arkansas
- Founded: December 27, 1831 (194 years ago)
- Named after: Arkansas Post
- Elevation: 177 ft (54 m)
- Time zone: UTC−06:00 (CST)
  - Summer (DST): UTC−05:00 (CDT)
- GNIS feature ID: 66948
- Highways: Highway 169
- Major airport: Clinton National Airport (LIT)

Arkansas Post is an unincorporated community located along the north side of the Arkansas River in Arkansas County, Arkansas. It is home to the Arkansas Post National Memorial.

== History ==
In 1805 the U.S. government established a store at the location, but was closed in 1810, due to competition from private merchants. Nathaniel Pryor, who participated in the Lewis and Clark expedition, and Samuel B. Richards of Natchez established a store at the location after the War of 1812. The present-day unincorporated community of Arkansas Post was founded on December 27, 1831, with the establishment of the first U.S. post office in the Arkansas Territory.

== Infrastructure ==
Highway 169 terminates at Arkansas Post.

== Notable residents ==
- Antoine Barraqué, French Indian trader
- Saracen, Quapaw chief
