= Parnell-Sharpe House =

Historic house in Arkansas, United States

- U.S. National Register of Historic Places
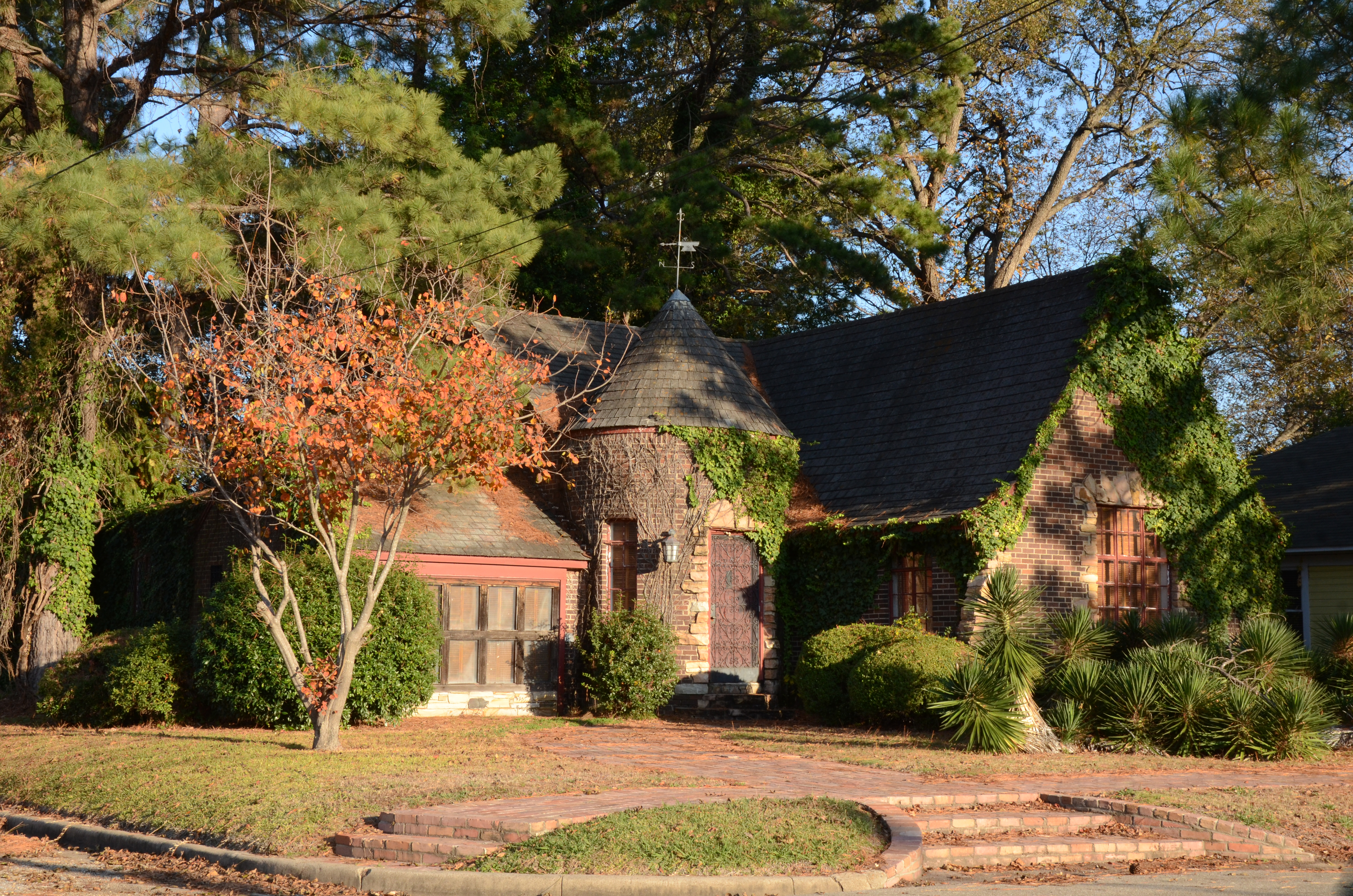

- Location within Arkansas Location within the United States
- Location: 302 N. Second St., McGehee, Arkansas
- Coordinates: 33°37′51″N 91°23′52″W
- Area: less than one acre
- Built: 1936
- Built by: Duren Sharpe
- Architectural style: Late 19th And 20th Century Revivals, French Eclectic
- NRHP reference No.: 89001594
- Added to NRHP: September 28, 1989

The Parnell-Sharpe House is a historic house at 302 North 2nd Street in McGehee, Arkansas. The 1 1/2-story brick house was built in 1936, and is probably unique in Desha County as an example of French Eclectic architecture constructed using local materials. The house is built out of red tapestry brick, and has a roughly T-shaped plan, with a projecting element in the front (west) facade that includes a tower topped by a conical roof. To the north is a single-story section that was originally a garage, but has been converted to interior space.

The house was built and occupied by Duren Sharpe and his wife, Mildred Parnell Sharpe. Sharpe was self-taught in a number of building trades, including bricklaying and carpentry, and built a number of residential and commercial buildings in McGehee.

The house was listed on the National Register of Historic Places in 1989.

== See also ==
- National Register of Historic Places listings in Desha County, Arkansas
