= Mound Cemetery (Arkansas City, Arkansas) =

Historic cemetery in Arkansas, United States

- U.S. National Register of Historic Places
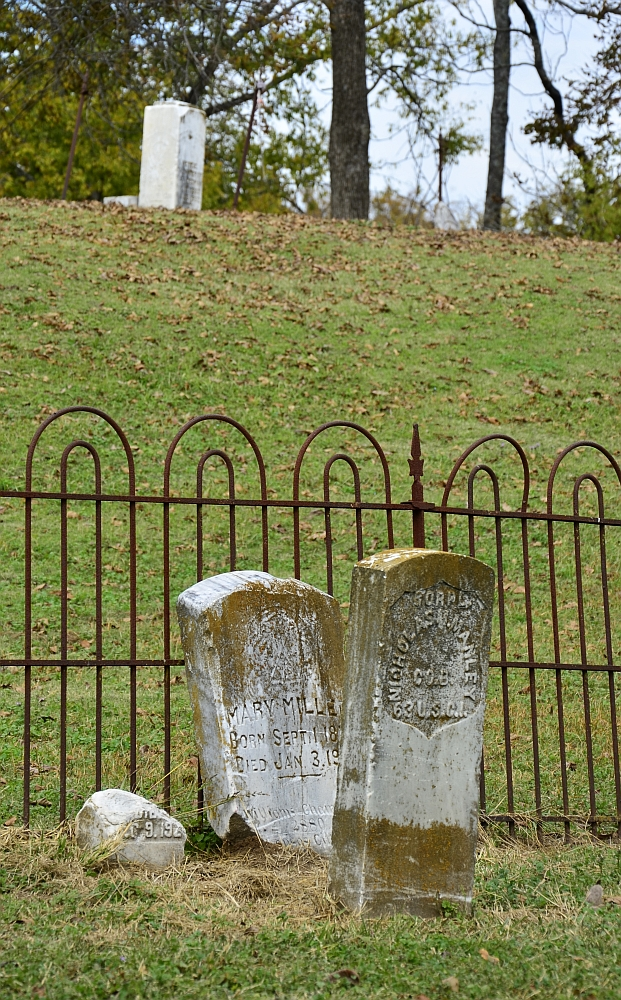

- Location within Mississippi Location within the United States
- Nearest city: Arkansas City, Arkansas
- Coordinates: 33°37′13″N 91°12′3″W
- Area: less than one acre
- Built: 1866
- NRHP reference No.: 07001426
- Added to NRHP: January 24, 2008

The Mound Cemetery is a historic cemetery, located just outside Arkansas City, Arkansas in Desha County. The oldest portion of the cemetery, dating to the 1860s, is located on top of a Mississippian culture mound, one of the few places the early American settlers of the area found to be safe from periodic flooding by the Mississippi River. It is located off County Road 351, about one-half mile outside Arkansas City, and about 3 miles (4.8 km) from the river.

The mound was probably created sometime between 1200 and 1600 AD. It was reported in the 19th century that people digging new graves would find artifacts and older human remains. The oldest dated grave is that of Rachel Horton, who died March 15, 1866. The cemetery contains 78 historic graves, and continues to be used for burials.

The cemetery was listed on the National Register of Historic Places in 2008.

== See also ==
- National Register of Historic Places listings in Desha County, Arkansas
