= Kemp Cotton Gin Historic District =

Historic district in Arkansas, United States

- U.S. National Register of Historic Places
- U.S. Historic district
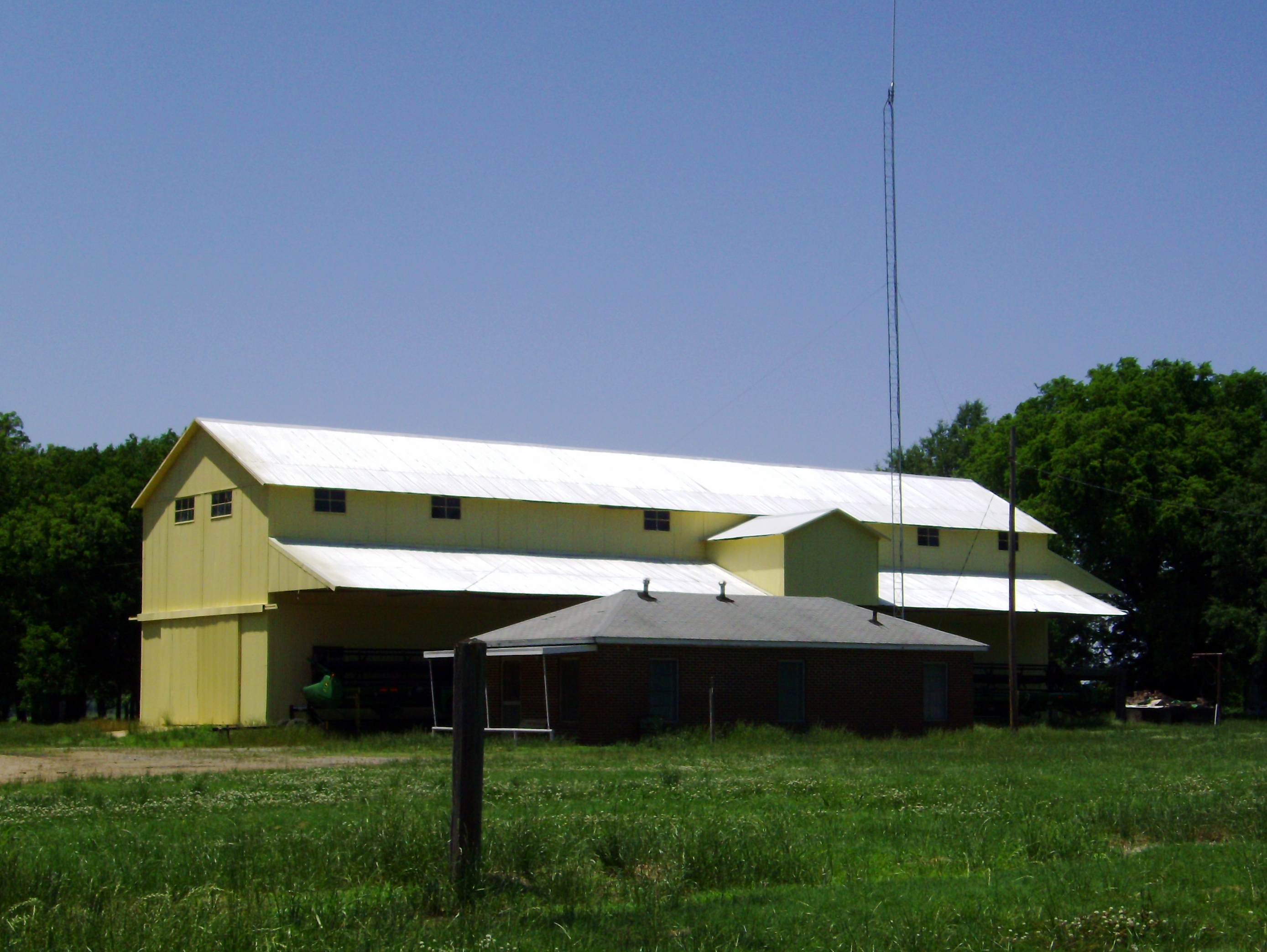

- Location within Arkansas Location within the United States
- Location: Cty.Rd. 227 W. of AR 1, Rohwer, Arkansas
- Coordinates: 33°45′48″N 91°16′36″W
- Area: 2.3 acres (0.93 ha)
- Built: 1950
- Architectural style: Plain Traditional
- MPS: Cotton and Rice Farm History and Architecture in the Arkansas Delta MPS
- NRHP reference No.: 05000491
- Added to NRHP: June 1, 2005

The Kemp Cotton Gin Historic District encompasses the only cotton gin extant in the Rohwer area of Desha County, Arkansas. The gin was built in 1950 by O. O. Kemp, a few years after the closure of the Rohwer War Relocation Center, where as many as 10,000 Japanese-Americans were interned during the Second World War. After the center's closure much of its land was returned to agricultural use, and Kemp built this gin near the Missouri Pacific Railroad line that ran through Rohwer. In addition to the gin, the complex Kemp built includes a pump house, scale house, and office. This entire complex was listed on the National Register of Historic Places in 2005.

== See also ==
- National Register of Historic Places listings in Desha County, Arkansas
