= Hubert & Ionia Furr House =

Historic house in Arkansas, United States

- U.S. National Register of Historic Places
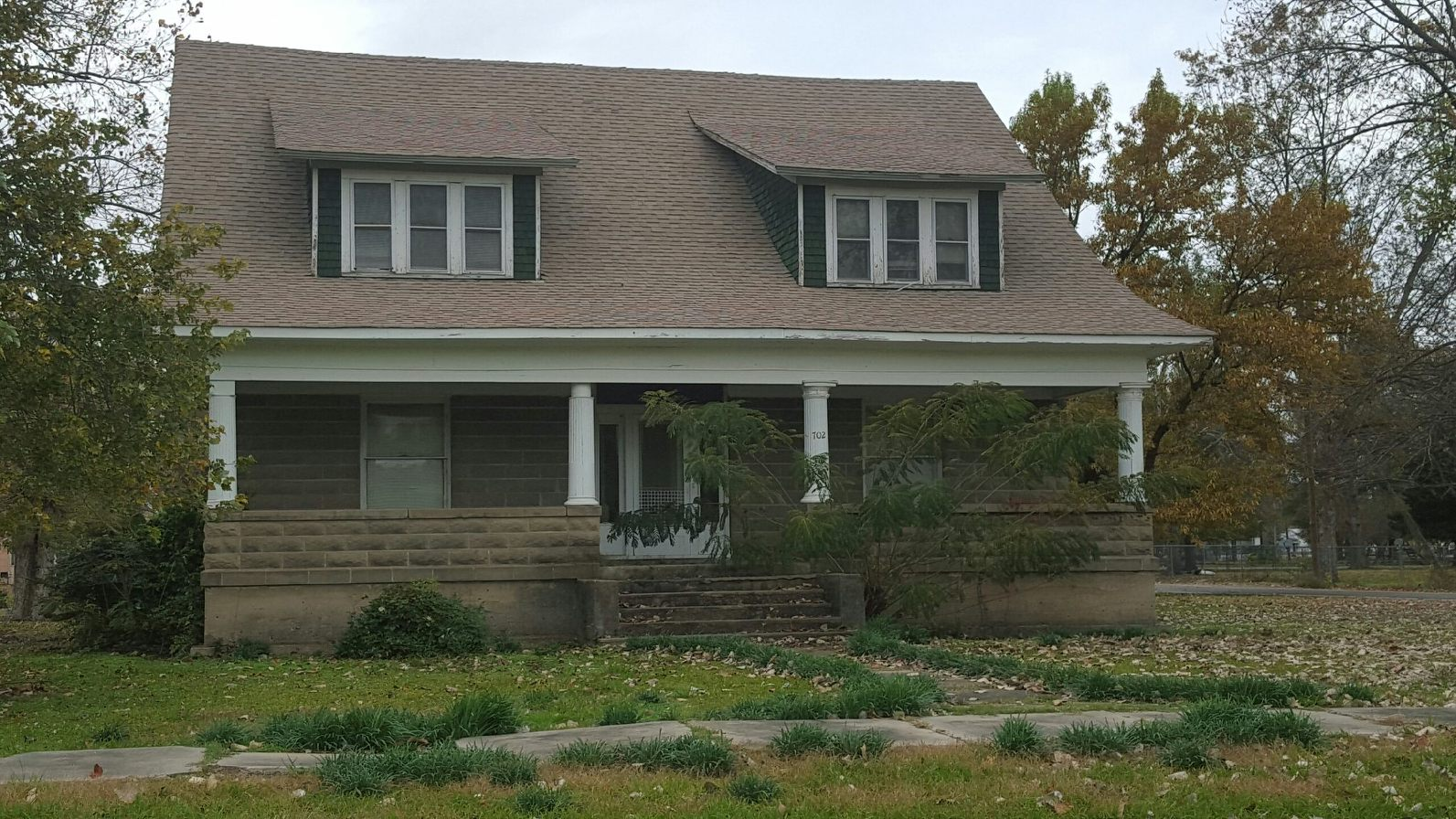

- Location within Arkansas Location within the United States
- Location: 702 Desoto Ave., Arkansas City, Arkansas
- Coordinates: 33°36′24″N 91°12′04″W
- Area: less than one acre
- Built: 1910
- Built by: Hubert Furr
- Architectural style: Dutch Colonial Revival
- NRHP reference No.: 10001197
- Added to NRHP: February 4, 2011

The Hubert & Ionia Furr House is a historic house at 702 Desoto Avenue in Arkansas City, Arkansas. The 1 1/2-story Dutch Colonial Revival house was built in 1910 by Hubert Furr, a local timber dealer. It has a basically rectangular plan, with a side-gable roof with flared eaves. The first floor is built out of decorative concrete blocks, while the gable ends and roof dormers are clad in wood shingles. There is a porch spanning the front facade supported by fluted Doric columns resting on a low wall of decorative concrete blocks.

The house was listed on the National Register of Historic Places in 2011.

== See also ==
- National Register of Historic Places listings in Desha County, Arkansas
