= Sulphur Springs, Ashley County, Arkansas =

Sulphur Springs, Arkansas
- Unincorporated community
- Sulphur Springs's position in Arkansas. Sulphur Springs, Arkansas (the United States)
- Coordinates: 33°04′18″N 92°01′52″W
- Country: United States
- State: Arkansas
- County: Ashley
- Elevation: 75 ft (23 m)
- Time zone: UTC-6 (Central (CST))
  - Summer (DST): UTC-5 (CDT)
- GNIS feature ID: 78493

Sulphur Springs is an unincorporated community in Ashley County, Arkansas, United States. The community is located at the southern terminus of Arkansas Highway 169.
