= Dickinson-Moore House =

Historic house in Arkansas, United States

- U.S. National Register of Historic Places
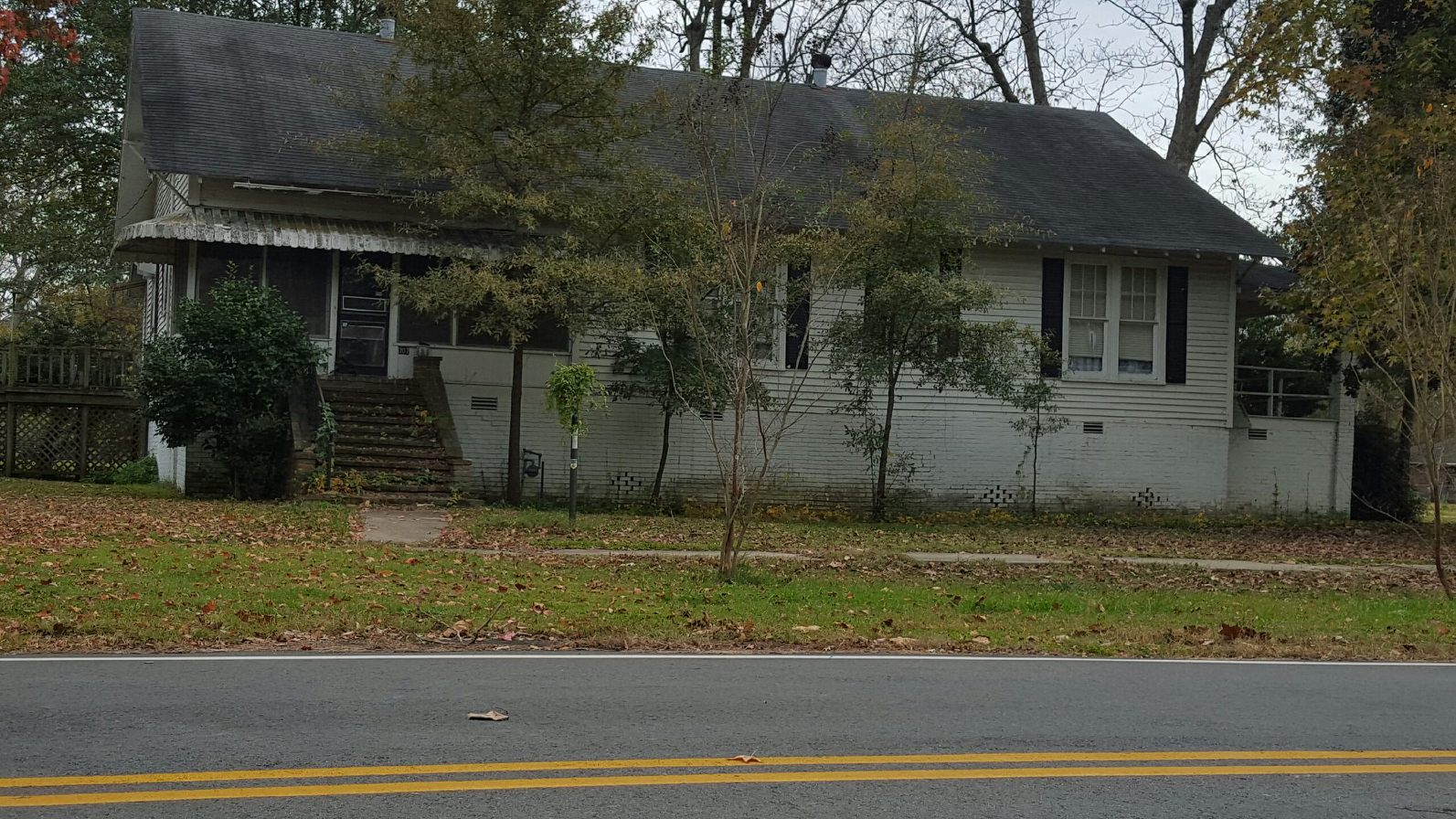

- Location within Arkansas Location within the United States
- Location: 707 Robert S. Moore Avenue, Arkansas City, Arkansas
- Coordinates: 33°36′31″N 91°12′10″W
- Area: 1 acre (0.40 ha)
- Architectural style: American Craftsman/Bungalow
- NRHP reference No.: 10001192
- Added to NRHP: February 1, 2011

The Dickinson-Moore House is a historic house at 707 Robert S. Moore Avenue in Arkansas City, Arkansas. This 1 1/2-story Craftsman style house was built c. 1915, probably for a member of the locally prominent Dickinson family, one of its early occupants. The house is distinctive for being built on a brick foundation 5 feet (1.5 m) high, for protection against floods that regularly visited the area. (Despite this precaution, the house was under eight feet of water in a major 1927 flood.) The house has retained its original siding and windows, and exhibits typical Craftsman details such as exposed rafter ends and large knee brackets in the eaves.

The house was listed on the National Register of Historic Places in 2011.

== See also ==
- National Register of Historic Places listings in Desha County, Arkansas
