= Arkansas Highway 4 =

State highway in Arkansas, United States

Highway 4

Route information
- Maintained by ArDOT
- Existed: 1926–present

Section 1
- Length: 2.99 mi (4.81 km)
- West end: SH-4 at the Oklahoma state line near Cove
- East end: US 59 / US 71 at Cove

Section 2
- Length: 22.1 mi (35.6 km)
- West end: US 65 / US 165 / US 278 in McGehee
- East end: AR 1 at Rohwer

Location
- Country: United States
- State: Arkansas
- Counties: Polk, Desha

Highway system
- Arkansas Highway System; Interstate; US; State; Business; Spurs; Suffixed; Scenic; Heritage
← AR 3	→ AR 5

Arkansas Highway 4 (AR 4) is a designation for two state highways in Arkansas. One segment of 2.99 miles (4.81 km) runs from the Oklahoma state line east to US 59/US 71 at Cove. A second segment of 22.1 miles (35.6 km) runs from US 278 in McGehee east to Highway 1 at Rohwer. The two routes were formerly connected until a portion of approximately 230 miles (370 km) was redesignated US 278 in 1998. The eastern segment is part of the Great River Road.

== Route description ==
=== Oklahoma to Cove ===
Highway 4 begins at the Oklahoma state line as a continuation of OK-4 and runs east to Cove. The route then meets US 59/US 71 and ends. Highway 4 formerly continued along US 59/US 71 south to Wickes, then across the state along present US 278.

=== McGehee to Rowher ===
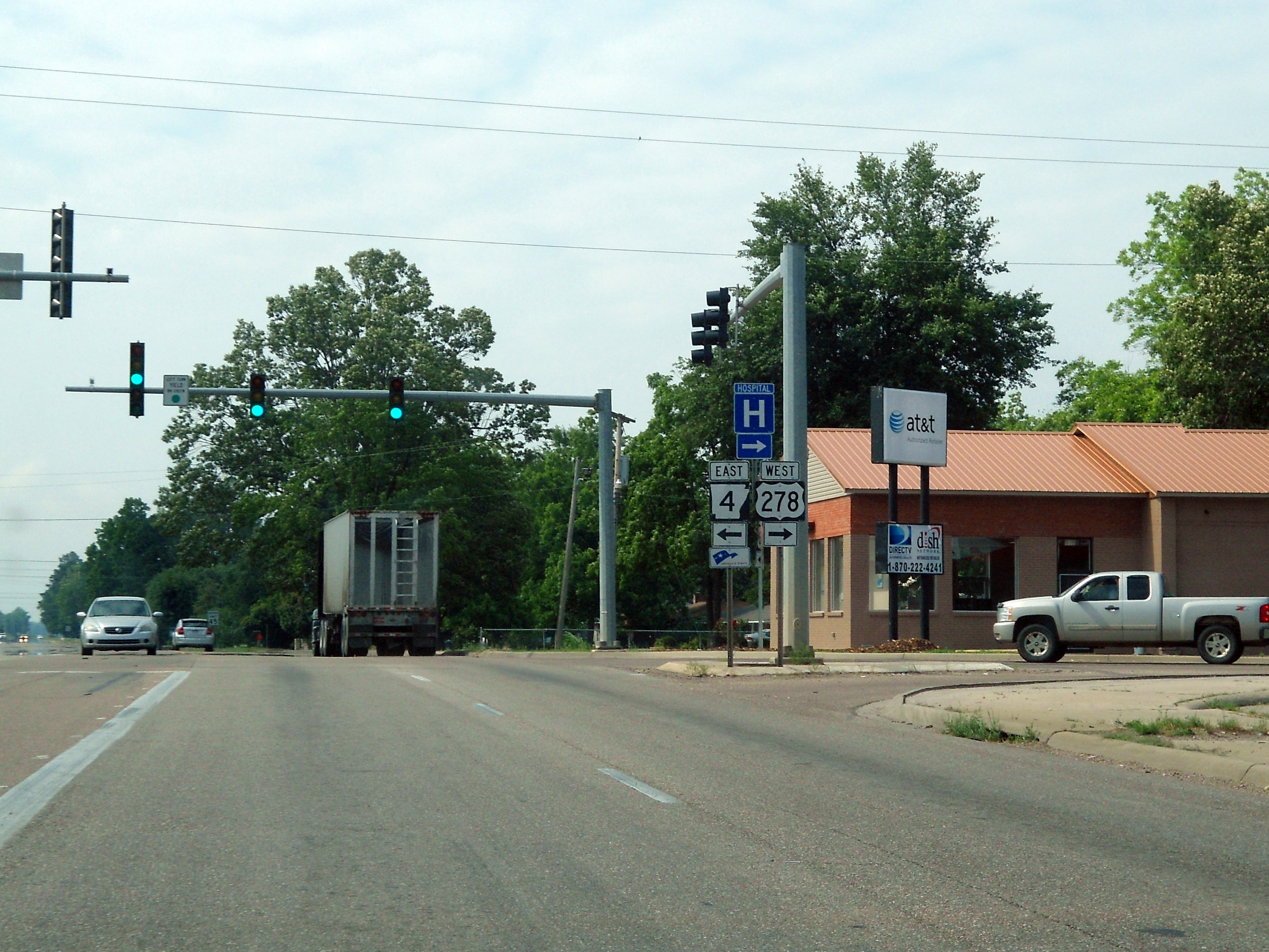
Western terminus of Highway 4's eastern segment at US 65/US 165/US 278 in McGehee

The route begins east of McGehee at US 65/US 165/US 278. Highway 4 winds east past the Delta Country Club and Trippe Holly Grove Cemetery before curving due east toward Arkansas City. The route runs east to Arkansas City. At Arkansas City, the route has its only spur route, which serves the historic part of town, while Highway 4 turns north. The highway runs along the Mississippi River briefly before terminating at Highway 1.

== Major intersections ==
=== Eastern Arkansas section ===
County	Location	mi	km	Destinations	Notes
Desha	McGehee	0.00	0.00	US 65 / US 165 (Great River Road) / US 278	Western terminus
Desha	McGehee	1.1	1.8	AR 169 north – McGehee	Southern terminus of AR 169
Desha	McGehee	1.2	1.9	AR 980 north – Airport	
Desha	Trippe Junction	3.0	4.8	AR 159 south to AR 35	Northern terminus of AR 159
Desha	Arkansas City	10.2	16.4	AR 4S south (Sprague Street) – Arkansas City Business District	Northern terminus of AR 4S
Desha		22.1	35.6	AR 1 – McGehee, Watson	Eastern terminus
1.000 mi = 1.609 km; 1.000 km = 0.621 mi

=== Arkansas–Oklahoma section ===
State	County	Location	mi	km	Destinations	Notes
Oklahoma	McCurtain	Smithville	0.00	0.00	US 259	Western terminus
Oklahoma–Arkansas line			12.01 0.00	19.33 0.00	SH-4 ends AR 4 begins	
Arkansas	Polk	Cove	2.99	4.81	US 71 / US 59 – Mena, DeQueen	Eastern terminus
1.000 mi = 1.609 km; 1.000 km = 0.621 mi

== Arkansas City spur ==
Highway 4S
- Location: Arkansas City
- Length: 1.04 mi (1.67 km)

Arkansas Highway 4 Spur is a spur of 1.04 miles (1.67 km) in Arkansas City.

== Former special routes ==
=== Camden business loop ===
Highway 4B
- Location: Camden
- Length: 6.1 mi (9.8 km)
- Existed: May 28, 1976–1998

Arkansas Highway 4 Business was a business route of 2.97 miles (4.78 km) in Camden; it was renamed US 278B in the 1998 redesignation. The route began on Washington Street near the Camden Country Club and terminated at US 79B.

=== Camden spur ===
Highway 4S
- Location: Camden
- Existed: May 28, 1976

Arkansas Highway 4 Spur was a spur route in Camden, following the under-construction bypass. The route was redesignated as Highway 4 in 1976.

=== Warren business loop ===
Highway 4B
- Location: Warren
- Length: 3.8 mi (6.1 km)
- Existed: 1998

Arkansas Highway 4 Business was a business route of 3.78 miles (6.08 km) in Warren; it was renamed US 278B in the 1998 redesignation.

== See also ==
- List of state highways in Arkansas
