= Merchants & Farmers Bank =

- U.S. National Register of Historic Places
- Location within Arkansas Location within the United States
- Location: Waterman and Main Sts., Dumas, Arkansas
- Coordinates: 33°53′15″N 91°29′29″W
- Area: less than one acre
- Built: 1913
- Architect: Charles L. Thompson
- Architectural style: Classical Revival
- MPS: Thompson, Charles L., Design Collection TR
- NRHP reference No.: 82000809
- Added to NRHP: December 22, 1982

The Merchants & Farmers Bank is a historic bank building at Waterman and Main Streets in Dumas, Arkansas. The Classical Revival brick building was built in 1913 to a design by Charles L. Thompson. It is a single story, with the brick laid in Flemish bond. The main entrance is flanked by marble Ionic columns.

The building was listed on the National Register of Historic Places in 1982.

== See also ==
- National Register of Historic Places listings in Desha County, Arkansas
