= Japanese American Internment Museum =

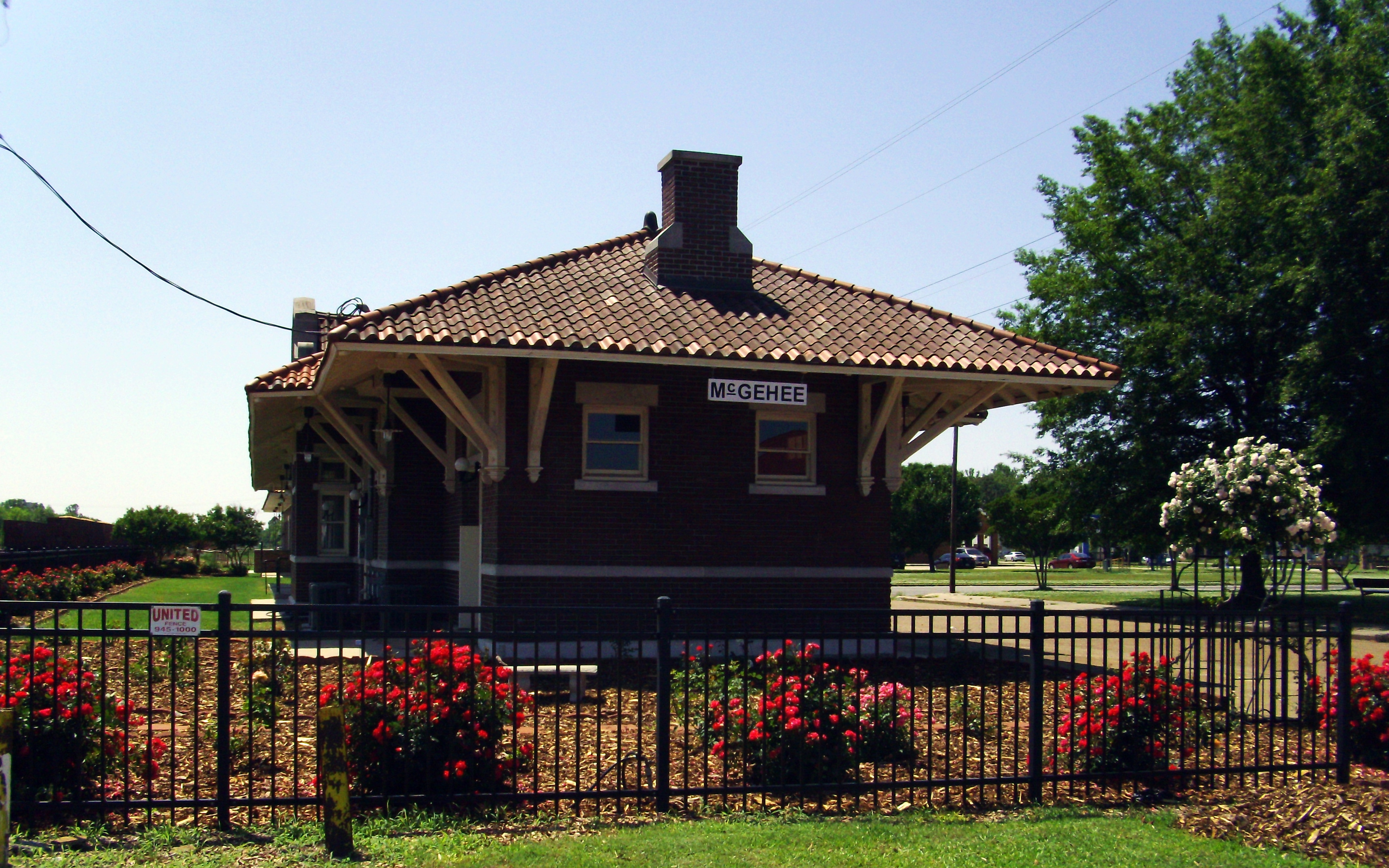
- Established: 2013
- Location: 100 South Railroad Street; McGehee, Arkansas
- Coordinates: 33°37′42″N 91°23′42″W
- Type: History museum
- Website: Jerome-Rohwer Interpretive Museum & Visitor Center
- Missouri--Pacific Railroad Depot--McGehee
- U.S. National Register of Historic Places
- Area: less than one acre
- Built: 1910
- Built by: Missouri-Pacific Railroad
- Architectural style: Late 19th And 20th Century Revivals, Bungalow/American craftsman, Mediterranean, Italianate
- MPS: Historic Railroad Depots of Arkansas MPS
- NRHP reference No.: 92000616
- Added to NRHP: June 11, 1992

The Japanese American Internment Museum (Japanese: 日系アメリカ人抑留博物館 Nikkei Amerikajin Yokuryū Hakubutsukan), also known as the WWII Japanese American Internment Museum and the Jerome-Rohwer Interpretive Museum & Visitor Center, is a history museum in McGehee, Arkansas. The museum features exhibits regarding the area history of Japanese American internment in the 1940s when more than 17,000 Japanese Americans were housed at nearby Rohwer War Relocation Center and Jerome War Relocation Center during World War II. Exhibits include a film, oral histories, photographs, personal artifacts and some art made by internees, as well as changing art exhibitions. The museum also has started a library that lends books to people about the Japanese American experience.

Visitors are encouraged to tour the remains of the Rohwer War Relocation Center, which is located about 17 miles (27 km) away from the museum. The site includes a memorial, cemetery, interpretive panels and audio kiosks.

The museum opened its doors on April 16, 2013, and is located in the south building of the historic McGehee Railroad Depot. It is one of several Arkansas State University Heritage Sites.

The dedication ceremony for the museum featured the actor, activist, and former camp incarceree George Takei giving a speech; his narration is also featured on a number of the audio displays.

== History ==
=== Building ===
The Missouri Pacific Railroad Depot-McGehee is a historic railroad station on Railroad Street in McGehee, Arkansas. The single-story brick building was built c. 1910 by the Missouri Pacific Railroad in its distinctive Mediterranean/Italianate style. The building is of particular importance in McGehee because the town is located where it is due to the company's decision to locate the station here. The station has a basic cruciform plan, an elongated rectangle with a projecting telegrapher's station on one side, and a matching projection on the other. It has a red tile roof, with a spreading cornice supported by Italianate brackets.

The building was listed on the National Register of Historic Places in 1992.

=== Museum creation ===
In addition to its structures and art, this museum also has unique work spaces and a historic section.

The work spaces are used for collections and more specifically for the Frank. H Watase Media Arts Center. Wedding receptions and other events are hosted in the community area of the museum.

The historic section of the museum is interesting since they did wait a while to make that section and it is one of the most important parts to mention. One important exhibition that is included in the museum is the "Fighting for Democracy: Who is the 'We' in 'We, the People'?"

== Awards ==
Over the years of being open the museum has received multiple awards.

- 2013
  - Cultural Heritage award from Arkansas Delta ByWays
  - Natural State Category Finalist from Arkansas Governor's Conference on Tourism
  - Southern Travel Treasure from AAA Southern Traveler Magazine
- 2014
  - Natural and Cultural Heritage award from Arkansas Delta ByWays
- 2015
  - Bootstrap Award Winner From the Henry Awards given by Arkansas Parks and Tourism at the Governor's Conference on Tourism
    - presented because they achieved a successful museum with limited resources and finances.

== Exhibits ==
The museum occasionally has an exhibit about Nancy Chikaraishi. Her artwork is displayed, showing the struggle of the Japanese American's inside of the camps. She is mainly featured because her and her parents were past internees at Rohwer. Her artwork consists of charcoal drawings, sculptures and paintings of their experience.

== See also ==
- Bibliography of the Japanese American Internment during World War II
- Outline of Japanese American Internment during World War II
- Japanese Garden of Peace
- List of museums in Arkansas
- National Japanese American Veterans Memorial Court
- National Register of Historic Places listings in Desha County, Arkansas
