= Charles Robert McPherson =

American Baptist pastor (1926–2020)

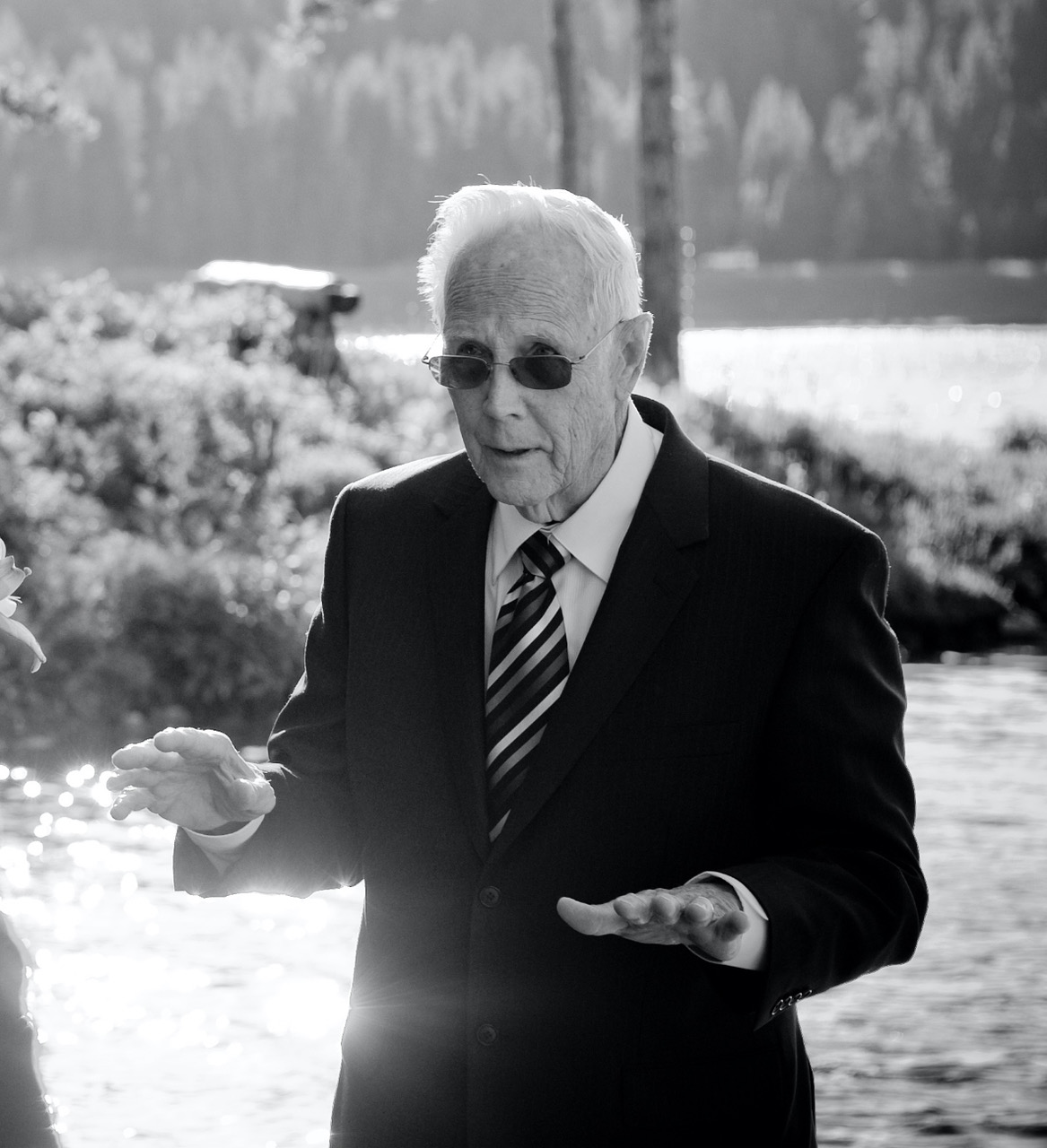
Charles Robert (Bob) McPherson, pictured in 2009

Charles Robert McPherson (January 7, 1926 – September 22, 2020) was the senior pastor of the great Riverside Church in Denver.

== Early life ==
Born in McGehee, Arkansas, McPherson is the oldest son of Dr. Charles Robert (George) McPherson and Alice McPherson. During his childhood, there was a fire that took their house and the family lost everything. The family could no longer provide for Bob, so he moved to live with his mother's sister, Tiny, in Lake Village, Arkansas. Aunty Tiny enrolled Bob in a Catholic school. When Bob was 10, his parents moved to Lake Village allowing Bob to move back in with his immediate family. They all attended First Baptist Church, where he first draws his attention for preaching. Bob, encouraged to attend college by an English teacher, applied and gained entry to Ouachita Baptist University. Bob was very involved at University, spending his time as a Cheerleader, head of his dorm, Band Director and Class President.

== Early Ministry Work ==
Small churches around Arkansas often requests the Baptist University to send young men to preach at their church, which allow the church a speaker, and provide students with experience. This was Bob's first experience with preaching. On his way to a new job in Alaska, Bob stopped in Fort Worth, Texas at Southwestern Seminary, now Southwestern Baptist Theological Seminary. Undecided about his plans, he stayed there through summer and worked at the Seminary.

During his studies, Bob met a preacher that went by the name McBernie, in South Fort Worth, who was well-known and requested by churches all over Texas that he preach for them. McBernie soon became a mentor figure and Bob learned not only preaching, but McBernie's hobby of fencing. It wasn't long before McBernie sent Bob to preach at other churches in his place. Through this experience, Bob preached in many churches, eventually coming on staff at Rosen Heights in 1948. Bob remained at Rosen Heights until he completed his time at Southwestern Seminary, taking on various roles including Associate Pastor, education director and Youth Director.

== Riverside Church, sbc ==
In 1962, Bob and his wife Jean joined South Denver Baptist, a community of 50 people. The church quickly grew and was relocated to Alameda and I-25 and renamed Riverside Church. He stayed at Riverside for 28 years and helped it grow into the largest church in Denver at the time. It eventually relocated to Speer and I-25, next to Mile High Stadium, where it still stands today. When he retired, the church had 5,000 members and an average Sunday attendance of 2,500.

== Television ==
While at Riverside Church, Bob preached for almost 20 years on ABC, CBS, and NBC TV stations.

== Publications ==
- Descendants of Cornelius Moore and Elizabeth Grandon, Moore Family History Publication Committee, 1985
- The Jesse Weatherford family of Darlington County, South Carolina: eight generations of descendants, J.W. Talwar, 2004
- Proceedings [of] the Constitutional Convention, 1981
- Proceedings, Volume 16, Part 1981
- Anadarko: Days of Glory, N. Dale Talkington, 1999
