= Pickens, Desha County, Arkansas =

Pickens, Arkansas
- Unincorporated community
- Location in Arkansas Pickens (the United States)
- Coordinates: 33°50′44″N 91°28′54″W
- Country: United States
- State: Arkansas
- County: Desha
- Elevation: 157 ft (48 m)
- Time zone: UTC-6 (Central (CST))
  - Summer (DST): UTC-5 (CDT)
- ZIP code: 71662
- Area code: 870
- GNIS feature ID: 77991

Pickens is an unincorporated community in Desha County, Arkansas, United States. Pickens is 3 miles (4.8 km) south of Dumas. Pickens has a post office with ZIP code 71662.
