= Nathaniel Pryor (pioneer) =

American pioneer (c.1806–1849/50)

Nathaniel Pryor (c. 1806–died 1849/1850), was an American citizen captured in Alta California (a former province of New Spain and Mexico), who later became an esteemed citizen of Los Angeles, California. He was also known as Nathaniel Miguel Pryor and Miguel Pryor.

== Family and early life ==
Nathaniel Pryor was born about 1806 in Kentucky. He married in 1838 in California, then part of Mexico, at Mission San Gabriel. The record stated his father's name as Nathaniel Pryor (speculated by researchers to be Nathaniel Hale Pryor) of Louisville and Mary Davis was his mother. His bride was Maria Teresa Sepulveda, a descendant of Francisco Xavier Sepulveda, a Mexican colonialist whose descendants owned vast tracts of land in Alta California.

== Captured by Mexico ==
Nathaniel Pryor was noted for his entry into California in March 1828. He was on a fur trapping expedition with several other Americans when captured by the Spanish and taken to the prison at San Diego. His companions were Sylvester Pattie and his son James O. Pattie, Richard Lochlyn all from Kentucky, Isaac Stover from Santa Fe, William Pope from Indiana, Jesse Ferguson from Missouri, and Edmund Russell from Pennsylvania. James O. Pattie wrote to John Coffin Jones, the American consul to the Sandwich Islands to ask assistance for their release.

== Citizen of Los Angeles ==
Upon his release Pryor settled in Los Angeles. A son named Juan Pryor was baptized in 1837. It's unlikely that Pryor was married to the boy's mother Juana Montalvo, as the baptism indicates the child was a "es" or a born out of marriage. He had two more sons by Sepulveda: Pablo Pryor and Manuel Pryor who died soon after birth in 1840.

Miguel Pryor (aka Nathaniel Pryor) is mentioned in an account of the defense of Los Angeles in 1846, during the Mexican War. National newspapers recounted that the citizens of Los Angeles had met in September 1846 to expel the American military who had positioned themselves in California during the war. An escalation in violence had left 150 Americans dead. To stop the bloodshed both sides met to agree on conditions of a cease-fire. The Americans were represented by surgeon Edward Gilchrist and the Los Angelenos were represented by Miguel Prior (sic).

Pryor married again in 1848 to Maria Felipe Paula Romero at the Plaza Church in Los Angeles. They had two additional children, Joaquina and Nathaniel Juan.

Stephen C. Foster, a mayor of Los Angeles, published in 1884 A Sketch of Some of the earliest Pioneers of Los Angeles in which he recorded meeting Nathaniel Pryor in about 1849.
