= Dumas, Arkansas =

- City
- City of Dumas
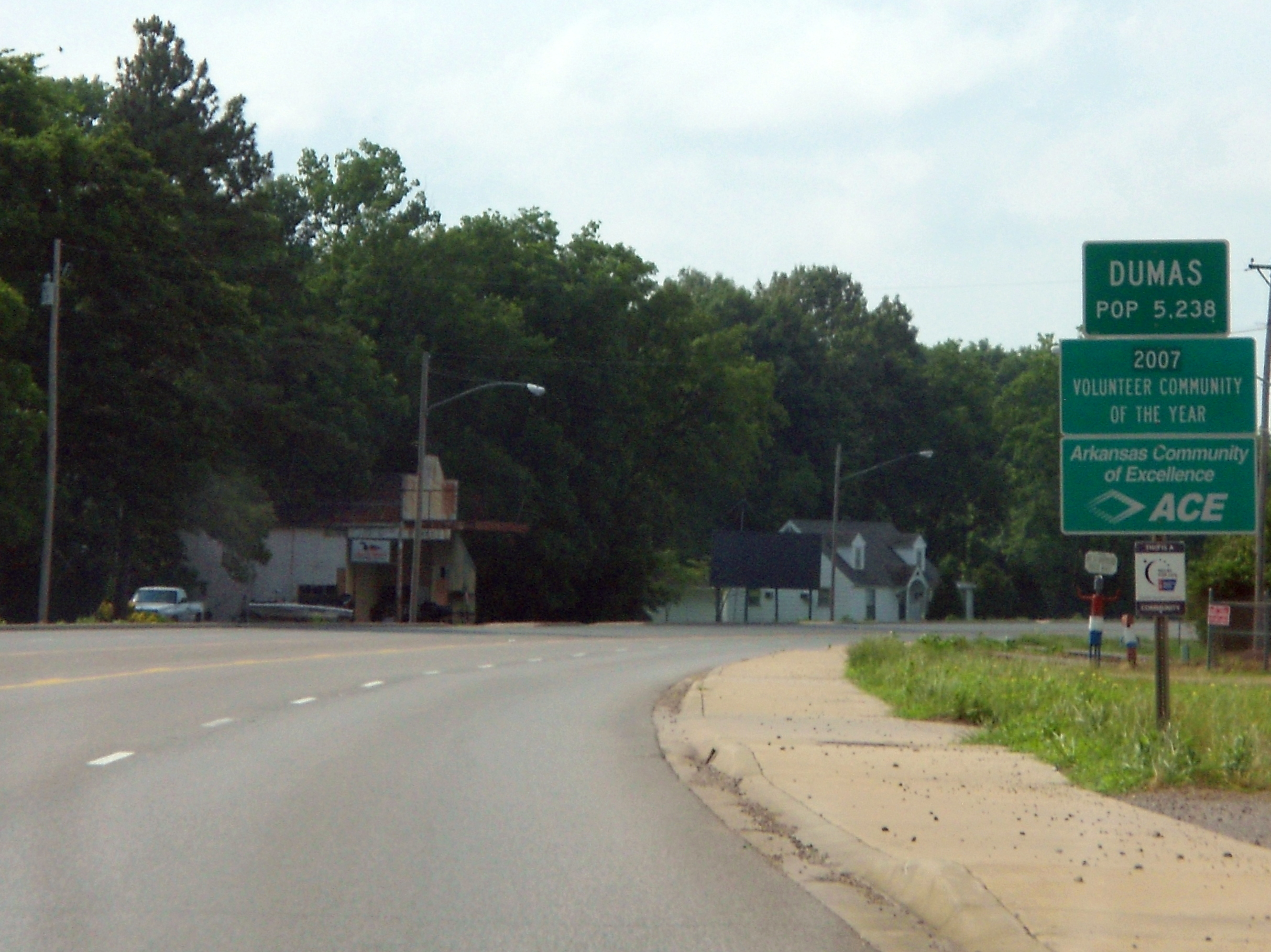
- Entering Dumas from the north on U.S. 65

- Location of Dumas in Desha County, Arkansas
- Coordinates: 33°53′02″N 91°29′19″W
- Country: United States
- State: Arkansas
- County: Desha
- Townships: Randolph, Walnut Lake

Area
  - Total: 2.91 sq mi (7.53 km^{2})
  - Land: 2.91 sq mi (7.53 km^{2})
  - Water: 0 sq mi (0.00 km^{2})
- Elevation: 161 ft (49 m)

Population (2020)
  - Total: 4,001
  - Estimate (2025): 3,476 ▼
  - Density: 1,377.0/sq mi (531.65/km^{2})
- Time zone: UTC-6 (Central (CST))
  - Summer (DST): UTC-5 (CDT)
- ZIP code(s): 71639, 71662
- Area code: 870
- FIPS code: 05-19990
- GNIS feature ID: 2403515
- Website: dumasar.net

Dumas (/ˈduːmɪs/ DO-miss) is a city in Desha County, Arkansas, United States. The population was 4,001 at the 2020 census.

== History ==
In 1870, a planter, merchant and surveyor of French descent, William B. Dumas, bought acres of farmland from the Abercrombie Holmes family. The area was named Watson District and the town continued to develop. The district was renamed Dumas and was incorporated in 1904.

Dumas proudly proclaims itself as "Home of the Ding Dong Daddy", a reference to the vaudeville song "I'm a Ding Dong Daddy from Dumas" by Phil Baxter. However, this is up for debate, as the city of Dumas, Texas, also lays claim, with some documentation, to the song being about them.

On February 24, 2007, Dumas was struck by a long-tracked EF3 tornado. Twenty-eight people were injured, and many homes and business were damaged or destroyed. Police said on CNN that "the feed mill was the local employer and now it is gone". Following the storm, U.S. Senator Mark Pryor criticized the Federal Emergency Management Agency's response to the recovery and cleanup efforts.

On March 19, 2022, two gunmen killed one person and injured at least 26 others, including six children, at the Hood-Nic Festival, an annual car show held in the city. One suspect was later arrested and admitted to firing a gun at another man present at the festival. In 2023, the shooter, Brandon Knight, was sentenced to 60 years for 10 counts of aggravated assault.

== Geography ==
According to the United States Census Bureau, the city has a total area of 3.2 square miles (8.4 km^{2}), all land. The city is located in the Delta Lowlands sub-region of the Arkansas Delta, producing a topography which is largely flat.

== Climate ==
The climate in the area is characterized by hot, humid summers and generally mild to cool winters. According to the Köppen Climate Classification system, Dumas has a humid subtropical climate, abbreviated "Cfa" on climate maps.

Climate data for Dumas, Arkansas
Month	Jan	Feb	Mar	Apr	May	Jun	Jul	Aug	Sep	Oct	Nov	Dec	Year
Record high °F (°C)	90 (32)	87 (31)	93 (34)	95 (35)	101 (38)	110 (43)	111 (44)	112 (44)	109 (43)	100 (38)	96 (36)	85 (29)	112 (44)
Mean maximum °F (°C)	63.5 (17.5)	67.7 (19.8)	76.5 (24.7)	82.3 (27.9)	88.7 (31.5)	98.8 (37.1)	101.6 (38.7)	101.8 (38.8)	97.3 (36.3)	87.6 (30.9)	77.5 (25.3)	65.7 (18.7)	101.8 (38.8)
Mean daily maximum °F (°C)	53.2 (11.8)	57.7 (14.3)	66.5 (19.2)	75.5 (24.2)	82.8 (28.2)	89.5 (31.9)	91.7 (33.2)	91.3 (32.9)	86.3 (30.2)	76.7 (24.8)	64.4 (18.0)	55.5 (13.1)	74.3 (23.5)
Mean daily minimum °F (°C)	35.4 (1.9)	38.0 (3.3)	45.1 (7.3)	53.8 (12.1)	62.4 (16.9)	69.7 (20.9)	72.0 (22.2)	70.6 (21.4)	64.0 (17.8)	53.2 (11.8)	43.5 (6.4)	37.4 (3.0)	53.8 (12.1)
Mean minimum °F (°C)	21.1 (−6.1)	27.3 (−2.6)	32.9 (0.5)	46.1 (7.8)	54.9 (12.7)	61.0 (16.1)	64.5 (18.1)	65.3 (18.5)	56.7 (13.7)	39.3 (4.1)	35.0 (1.7)	25.0 (−3.9)	21.1 (−6.1)
Record low °F (°C)	−5 (−21)	1 (−17)	12 (−11)	27 (−3)	36 (2)	45 (7)	50 (10)	50 (10)	34 (1)	25 (−4)	12 (−11)	−2 (−19)	−5 (−21)
Average precipitation inches (mm)	4.45 (113)	4.65 (118)	5.21 (132)	5.54 (141)	4.92 (125)	3.31 (84)	3.37 (86)	2.90 (74)	2.82 (72)	4.43 (113)	4.15 (105)	5.43 (138)	51.18 (1,301)
Average snowfall inches (cm)	0.2 (0.51)	0.3 (0.76)	0.1 (0.25)	0 (0)	0 (0)	0 (0)	0 (0)	0 (0)	0 (0)	0 (0)	0.1 (0.25)	0 (0)	0.7 (1.8)

== Demographics ==
Historical population
Census	Pop.	Note	%±
1910	519		—
1920	1,124		116.6%
1930	1,669		48.5%
1940	2,323		39.2%
1950	2,512		8.1%
1960	3,540		40.9%
1970	4,600		29.9%
1980	6,091		32.4%
1990	5,520		−9.4%
2000	5,238		−5.1%
2010	4,706		−10.2%
2020	4,001		−15.0%
2025 (est.)	3,476	▼	−13.1%
U.S. Decennial Census; 2014 Estimate

=== 2020 census ===
As of the 2020 census, Dumas had a population of 4,001. The median age was 39.9 years. 25.5% of residents were under the age of 18 and 19.4% of residents were 65 years of age or older. For every 100 females there were 83.7 males, and for every 100 females age 18 and over there were 78.1 males age 18 and over.

99.9% of residents lived in urban areas, while 0.1% lived in rural areas.

There were 1,741 households in Dumas, including 1,207 families. Of all households, 30.7% had children under the age of 18 living in them. 32.7% were married-couple households, 20.4% were households with a male householder and no spouse or partner present, and 43.0% were households with a female householder and no spouse or partner present. About 36.2% of all households were made up of individuals, and 15.2% had someone living alone who was 65 years of age or older.

There were 1,981 housing units, of which 12.1% were vacant. The homeowner vacancy rate was 2.3% and the rental vacancy rate was 8.8%.

Dumas racial composition
Race	Num.	Perc.
White	1,013	25.32%
Black or African American	2,511	62.76%
Native American	6	0.15%
Asian	22	0.55%
Other/mixed-race	116	2.9%
Hispanic or Latino	333	8.32%

=== 2000 census ===
As of the census of 2000, there were 5,238 people, 1,977 households, and 1,399 families residing in the city. The population density was 1,768.0 inhabitants per square mile (682.6/km^{2}). There were 2,177 housing units at an average density of 734.8 units per square mile (283.7 units/km^{2}). The racial makeup of the city was 26.62% White, 70.02% Black or African American, 0.08% Native American, 0.50% Asian, 2.00% from other races, and 0.78% from two or more races. 3.19% of the population were Hispanic or Latino of any race.

There were 1,977 households, out of which 36.4% had children under the age of 18 living with them, 43.9% were married couples living together, 23.4% had a female householder with no husband present, and 29.2% were non-families. 27.4% of all households were made up of individuals, and 12.9% had someone living alone who was 65 years of age or older. The average household size was 2.63 and the average family size was 3.19.

In the city, the population was spread out, with 30.1% under the age of 18, 10.7% from 18 to 24, 24.9% from 25 to 44, 21.2% from 45 to 64, and 13.1% who were 65 years of age or older. The median age was 33 years. For every 100 females, there were 83.9 males. For every 100 females age 18 and over, there were 78.3 males.

The median income for a household in the city was $25,754, and the median income for a family was $32,255. Males had a median income of $28,396 versus $19,363 for females. The per capita income for the city was $12,727. About 22.6% of families and 28.8% of the population were below the poverty line, including 39.9% of those under age 18 and 23.4% of those age 65 or over.

== Education ==
Dumas is served by the Dumas School District.

The Southeast Arkansas Public Library operates the Dumas Branch Library.

== Highways ==
U.S. Route 65 passes through the city, leading northwest 41 miles (66 km) to Pine Bluff and south (with U.S. Route 165) 19 miles (31 km) to McGehee. US 165 leads northeast from Dumas 34 miles (55 km) to DeWitt.

== Notable people ==
- Jim Hines (1946–2023), Olympic gold medalist
- Slink Johnson, actor, producer, comedian
- Charlotte Tillar Schexnayder (1923–2020), Newspaper editor and publisher, state legislator

== In popular culture ==
In September 2011, the feature film Mud, written and directed by Jeff Nichols and starring Reese Witherspoon and Matthew McConaughey, was filmed in and around Dumas. Several townspeople served as extras in the film, and a few had small speaking roles.

The Comedy Central docu-reality series Nathan For You filmed portions of its Season 4 finale, "Finding Frances," in Dumas.

== See also ==
- Arkansas Post National Memorial
- List of cities and towns in Arkansas
- National Register of Historic Places listings in Desha County, Arkansas
