= McGehee, Arkansas =

McGehee
- City
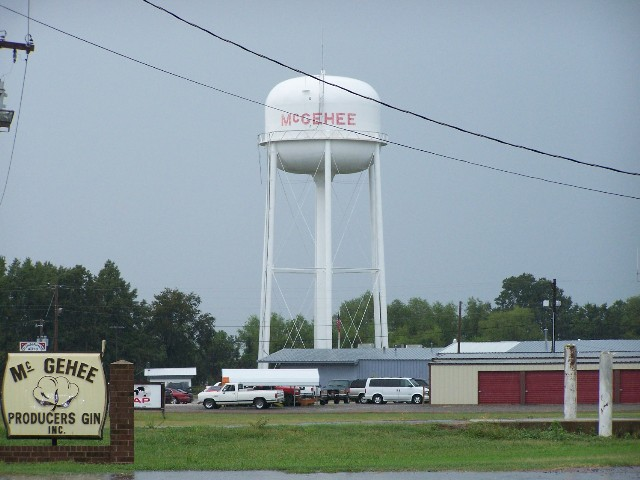

- Location of McGehee in Desha County, Arkansas
- Coordinates: 33°37′12″N 91°22′40″W
- Country: United States
- State: Arkansas
- County: Desha

Area
  - Total: 6.71 sq mi (17.37 km^{2})
  - Land: 6.71 sq mi (17.37 km^{2})
  - Water: 0 sq mi (0.00 km^{2})
- Elevation: 148 ft (45 m)

Population (2020)
  - Total: 3,849
  - Estimate (2025): 3,389 ▼
  - Density: 573.8/sq mi (221.54/km^{2})
- Time zone: UTC-6 (Central (CST))
  - Summer (DST): UTC-5 (CDT)
- ZIP codes: 71654, 71666
- Area code: 870
- FIPS code: 05-42770
- GNIS feature ID: 2405049
- Website: www.thecityofmcgehee.com

McGehee /məˈɡiː/ mə-GHEE is a city in Desha County, Arkansas, United States. As of the 2020 census, McGehee had a population of 3,849.

== History ==
The history of the city of McGehee and the history of the railroad through McGehee are intricately interwoven. The history of the railroad dates back to 1870 when a railroad was constructed from Pine Bluff southeast through Varner, to Chicot County.

Important in the history of the town of McGehee is the McGehee family which came to the area from Alabama in 1857. Benjamin McGehee, his wife, Sarah, a son, Abner, and daughters Laura and Mary settled on land that is now a part of McGehee. Abner McGehee, son of Benjamin and Sarah McGehee, purchased 240 acres (0.97 km^{2}) of land on July 1, 1876, on which the town of McGehee was later to be located.

When the railroad came into McGehee in 1878 and continued south and southwest, people began to move into the area. Abner McGehee constructed a large commissary building and entered the mercantile business to accommodate the new arrivals.

One of the first buildings in the area was a sawmill. The lumber cut in this mill was used to build shotgun-type rent houses.

A post office was established in the McGehee commissary, and in 1879 Abner McGehee became the first postmaster. The post office was named McGehee and served between 400 and 500 people.

An order of incorporation was signed on March 5, 1906. The first meeting of the town council was held on July 21, 1906.

During World War II, the outskirts of McGehee was the site of an American detention camp used to house Japanese and Japanese-American civilians who had previously lived on the U.S. West Coast.

Today the economy of the area is largely dependent upon agriculture. The railroad has been largely replaced by the trucking industry which hauls farm products from the gins and grain bins of the area to their destination. From a population of 400 in 1879, McGehee has grown into a community of about 5,000 citizens. Port facilities on the Mississippi River are being developed, and the present highway system is rebuilt to accommodate increased traffic.

The city maintains its connections with the railroads, with both the North Louisiana and Arkansas Railroad and the Arkansas Midland Railroad directly serving McGehee, and the Union Pacific indirectly serving it through interchange with the Arkansas Midland.

== Geography ==
US 278 passes through the center of town, leading west 26 miles (42 km) to Monticello and intersecting U.S. Routes 65 and 165 on the southeast side of town. US 65/165 leads north 19 miles (31 km) to Dumas. The three highways lead south together for 4 miles (6 km) before splitting; US 65 and 278 continue south 17 miles (27 km) to Lake Village, while US 165 turns southwest and leads 19 miles (31 km) to Montrose.

According to the United States Census Bureau, McGehee has a total area of 6.8 square miles (17.5 km^{2}), all land.

== Demographics ==
Historical population
Census	Pop.	Note	%±
1910	1,157		—
1920	2,368		104.7%
1930	3,488		47.3%
1940	3,663		5.0%
1950	3,854		5.2%
1960	4,448		15.4%
1970	4,683		5.3%
1980	5,671		21.1%
1990	4,997		−11.9%
2000	4,570		−8.5%
2010	4,219		−7.7%
2020	3,849		−8.8%
2025 (est.)	3,389	▼	−12.0%
U.S. Decennial Census

=== 2020 census ===
As of the 2020 census, McGehee had a population of 3,849. The median age was 36.8 years. 27.6% of residents were under the age of 18 and 16.2% of residents were 65 years of age or older. For every 100 females there were 85.5 males, and for every 100 females age 18 and over there were 80.6 males age 18 and over.

0.0% of residents lived in urban areas, while 100.0% lived in rural areas.

There were 1,577 households in McGehee, of which 35.3% had children under the age of 18 living in them. Of all households, 33.9% were married-couple households, 18.8% were households with a male householder and no spouse or partner present, and 41.2% were households with a female householder and no spouse or partner present. About 32.8% of all households were made up of individuals and 12.8% had someone living alone who was 65 years of age or older. There were 1,147 families residing in the city.

There were 1,887 housing units, of which 16.4% were vacant. The homeowner vacancy rate was 2.1% and the rental vacancy rate was 6.5%.

McGehee racial composition
Race	Num.	Perc.
White	1,666	43.28%
Black or African American	1,823	47.36%
Native American	21	0.55%
Asian	25	0.65%
Other/mixed	141	3.66%
Hispanic or Latino	173	4.49%

=== 2000 census ===
As of the census of 2000, there were 4,570 people, 1,836 households, and 1,259 families residing in the city. The population density was 711.7 inhabitants per square mile (274.8/km^{2}). There were 2,044 housing units at an average density of 318.3 per square mile (122.9/km^{2}). The racial makeup of the city was 56.72% White, 41.51% Black or African American, 0.57% Native American, 0.24% Asian, 0.04% Pacific Islander, 0.22% from other races, and 0.70% from two or more races. 1.49% of the population were Hispanic or Latino of any race.

There were 1,836 households, out of which 34.0% had children under the age of 18 living with them, 41.7% were married couples living together, 22.9% had a female householder with no husband present, and 31.4% were non-families. 29.4% of all households were made up of individuals, and 13.9% had someone living alone who was 65 years of age or older. The average household size was 2.44 and the average family size was 2.99.

In the city, the population was spread out, with 28.5% under the age of 18, 8.8% from 18 to 24, 25.0% from 25 to 44, 21.3% from 45 to 64, and 16.4% who were 65 years of age or older. The median age was 36 years. For every 100 females, there were 82.2 males. For every 100 females age 18 and over, there were 76.1 males.

The median income for a household in the city was $21,909, and the median income for a family was $25,270. Males had a median income of $31,429 versus $19,464 for females. The per capita income for the city was $14,191. About 26.7% of families and 30.0% of the population were below the poverty line, including 42.2% of those under age 18 and 23.6% of those age 65 or over.

== Government and infrastructure ==
The United States Postal Service operates the McGehee Post Office.

As of April 2020, the mayor of McGehee is Jeff Owyoung.

== Culture ==
The Japanese American Internment Museum is in McGehee.

== Education ==
The McGehee School District operates two public schools, including McGehee Elementary School (PK through grade 6) and McGehee High School (grades 7 through 12). The mascot and athletic emblem is the Owl, with red and white serving as the school colors.

The Southeast Arkansas Public Library operates the McGehee Branch Library.

== Notable people ==
- Oliver Keith Baker, experimental particle physicist and astrophysicist, born in McGehee
- Marquesha Davis, professional basketball player, born and raised in McGehee
- Ben F. Gross, first African-American mayor of Milpitas
- Caldwell Jones, professional basketball player, native of McGehee
- Charles Jones, professional basketball player
- Major Jones, professional basketball player
- Wil Jones, professional basketball player, born in McGehee
- Seth J. McKee, U.S. Air Force general, born in McGehee
- Charles Robert McPherson, senior pastor of the great Riverside Baptist Church
- Robert B. Stobaugh, chemical engineer and economist
