= Holt House =

Holt House or Holt Farm or variations may refer to:

== United Kingdom ==
- Holt House Stadium is the playing ground of Colne F.C.

== United States ==
- Elbert W. Holt House, Nashville, Arkansas, listed on the NRHP in Howard County, Arkansas
- Flavius Holt House, Nashville, Arkansas, listed on the NRHP in Howard County, Arkansas
- Benjamin Holt House, Stockton, California, listed on the NRHP in San Joaquin County, California
- Ryves Holt House, Lewes, Delaware (1665), oldest residential house in Delaware
- Holt–Peeler–Snow House, Macon, Georgia, NRHP-listed
- Walter R. Holt House, Macon, Georgia, listed on the NRHP in Bibb County, Georgia
- Lemon Wond Holt House, Honolulu, Hawaii, listed on the NRHP on Oahu, Hawaii
- Holt House (Monmouth, Illinois), a museum in Illinois where Pi Beta Phi Fraternity was founded
- Joseph Holt House and Chapel, Addison, Kentucky, listed on the NRHP in Breckinridge County, Kentucky
- Giltner-Holt House, Frankfort, Kentucky, listed on the NRHP in Franklin County, Kentucky
- Holt Farm (Andover, Massachusetts), NRHP-listed
- Holt-Cummings-Davis House, Andover, Massachusetts, NRHP-listed
- Dinehart-Holt House, Slayton, Minnesota, listed on the NRHP in Murray County, Minnesota
- L. Banks Holt House, Alamance, North Carolina, listed on the NRHP in Alamance County, North Carolina
- Holt-Frost House, Burlington, North Carolina, listed on the NRHP in Alamance County, North Carolina
- Moore-Holt-White House, Burlington, North Carolina, listed on the NRHP in Alamance County, North Carolina
- Holt-Harrison House, Fayetteville, North Carolina, listed on the NRHP in Cumberland County, North Carolina
- Charles T. Holt House, Haw River, North Carolina, listed on the NRHP in Alamance County, North Carolina
- Dr. William Rainey Holt House, Lexington, North Carolina, listed on the NRHP in Davidson County, North Carolina
- Holt–Saylor–Liberto House, Portland, Oregon, NRHP-listed
- Thomas Holt House, Brentwood, Tennessee, NRHP-listed
- Samuel and Geneva Holt Farmstead, South Jordan, Utah, NRHP-listed
- Charles B. Holt House, Charlottesville, Virginia, NRHP-listed
- Holt House (Washington, D.C.), a Smithsonian Institution building on the National Zoo grounds
- Ferrell-Holt House, Moundsville, West Virginia, NRHP-listed
- Holt and Balcom Logging Camp No. 1, Lakewood, Wisconsin, NRHP-listed
- Holt-Balcom Lumber Company Office, Oconto, Wisconsin, listed on the NRHP in Oconto County, Wisconsin
