= John M. Winstead Houses =

Historic houses in Tennessee, United States

- U.S. National Register of Historic Places
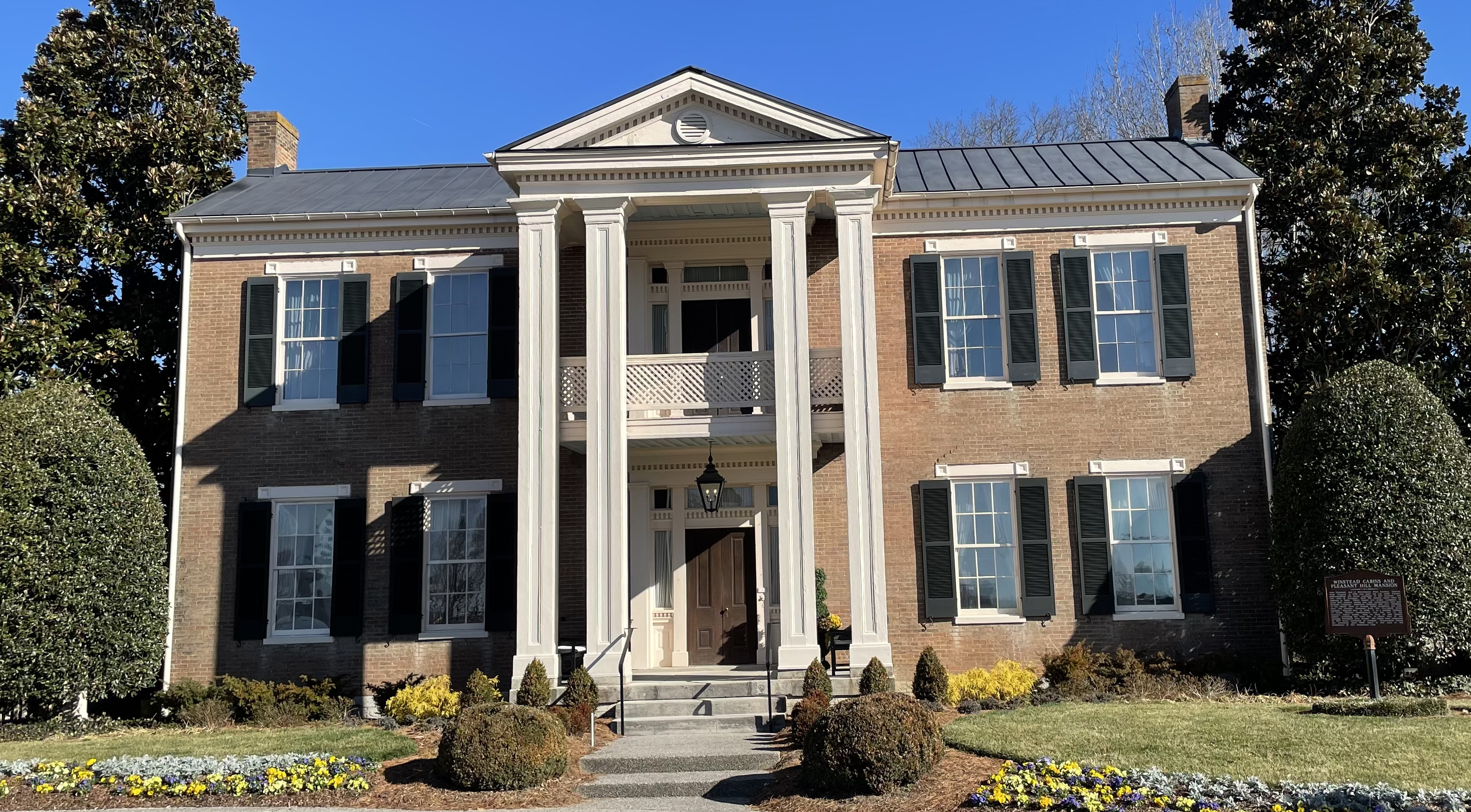

- Location within Tennessee Location within the United States
- Location: Concord Rd. 1 mi. E of Edmondson Pike, Brentwood, Tennessee
- Coordinates: 35°58′44″N 86°44′9″W
- Area: 10.5 acres (4.2 ha)
- Built: c. 1800, c. 1820 and c. 1858
- Architectural style: Greek Revival, Single pen I-house
- MPS: Williamson County MRA
- NRHP reference No.: 88000373
- Added to NRHP: April 13, 1988

The John M. Winstead Houses, also known as Pleasant Hill, are three antebellum houses in Brentwood, Tennessee that were listed on the National Register of Historic Places in 1988.

A 1988 study of Williamson County historic resources lists two buildings, WM-107 and WM-108, both named John Winstead House, as county historic resources. The house designated WM-108 comprises two log structures. The first was built as a single log pen home around 1800 by John Winstead, Sr. who was one of the first white settlers in the Williamson County area, having arrived in 1799. Around 1820, by which time Winstead had extensive land holdings and owned 10 slaves, he built a second single pen log cabin, oriented diagonally to the first cabin. Winstead, Sr. died in 1822, and his family continued to live on the property. Around 1870 the two cabins were connected by a framed-in structure. Similar construction is found in the Lamb-Stephens House and the Abram Glenn House.

The house designated WM-107, now known as Pleasant Hill Mansion, was built near the cabins by John M. Winstead, Jr., who by then owned about 450 acres (180 ha) of farmland. It is a two-story brick central passage I-frame home that was started in 1855 and took three years to complete. It has a central-bay entrance with Greek Revival detailing, including a two-story portico with square columns topped by capitals with Doric motifs. John Winstead, Jr., lived in this home until his death in 1896, after which ownership of the home passed to a related family named Edmondson. The house is now used as the clubhouse of the Governors Club golf course. It is similar in design to the James J. Sayers House (deemed National Register-eligible but not listed due to owner objection), and the National Register-listed John Seward House, Newton Jordan House, and Thomas Holt House.

When listed on the National Register, the property included three contributing buildings and three other contributing structures on an area of 10.5 acres (4.2 ha).
