= National Register of Historic Places listings in Murray County, Minnesota =

Location of Murray County in Minnesota

This is a list of the National Register of Historic Places listings in Murray County, Minnesota.

This is intended to be a complete list of the properties and districts on the National Register of Historic Places in Murray County, Minnesota, United States. The locations of National Register properties and districts for which the latitude and longitude coordinates are included below, may be seen in an online map.

There are eight properties and districts listed on the National Register in the county. Another property was once listed but has been removed.

This National Park Service list is complete through NPS recent listings posted April 24, 2026.

== Current listings ==
	Name on the Register	Image	Date listed	Location	City or town	Description
1	4-H Club Building, Murray County Fairgrounds	4-H Club Building, Murray County Fairgrounds	December 22, 2005 (#05001436)	Off Broadway Ave. 43°58′57″N 95°45′22″W	Slayton	Unique 1936 barn funded by local donations and the Works Progress Administration, reflecting the importance of 4-H activities in Murray County.
2	Avoca Public School	Avoca Public School	October 16, 1979 (#79003715)	Cole Ave. and 2nd St. 43°56′50″N 95°38′51″W	Avoca	One of the most substantial early schools remaining in southwest Minnesota, in use 1894–1970.
3	Chicago, Milwaukee, St. Paul and Pacific Depot	Chicago, Milwaukee, St. Paul and Pacific Depot	October 16, 1979 (#79003716)	St. Paul and Front Sts. 43°52′10″N 95°36′02″W	Fulda	Two-story train station built in 1880, a superlative example of the rail connections at the heart of most towns established on the Minnesota prairie. Now the Fulda Depot Museum.
4	Chicago, St. Paul, Minneapolis, and Omaha Turntable	Chicago, St. Paul, Minneapolis, and Omaha Turntable	December 12, 1977 (#77000758)	440 N. Mill St. 44°04′31″N 95°39′56″W	Currie	1901 manually-operated railway turntable built by the American Bridge Company for the end of a Chicago, St. Paul, Minneapolis and Omaha Railway branch line.
5	Dinehart-Holt House	Dinehart-Holt House	December 7, 1982 (#82000562)	2812 Linden Ave. 43°59′06″N 95°45′19″W	Slayton	1891 Queen Anne/Stick style house of Christopher (1845–1927) and Flora Dinehart (d. 1938), early settlers and leading citizens of Slayton. Now a historic house museum.
6	First National Bank	First National Bank	December 7, 1982 (#82000563)	115 N. St. Paul Ave. 43°52′12″N 95°36′02″W	Fulda	Unusually distinctive and well-preserved example of a small-town bank, built 1918–19 with gunmetal bricks and cream terracotta ornamentation.
7	Lake Shetek State Park WPA/Rustic Style Group Camp	Lake Shetek State Park WPA/Rustic Style Group Camp	July 2, 1992 (#92000777)	Zuya Group Center, 163 State Park Rd. 44°06′31″N 95°41′44″W	Currie vicinity	Two park buildings constructed 1940–1941, significant as examples of New Deal federal work relief, Minnesota state park development, and National Park Service rustic architecture.
8	Lake Shetek State Park WPA/Rustic Style Historic District	Lake Shetek State Park WPA/Rustic Style Historic District	July 2, 1992 (#89001656)	163 State Park Rd. 44°06′21″N 95°42′04″W	Currie vicinity	Eight park facilities built 1938–1941, significant as examples of New Deal federal work relief, Minnesota state park development, and National Park Service rustic split-stone architecture.

== Former listing ==
	Name on the Register	Image	Date listed	Date removed	Location	City or town	Description
1	Murray County Courthouse		April 13, 1977 (#77000759)	March 19, 1984	Main and 7th Sts.	Slayton	1892 Romanesque Revival courthouse. Demolished in 1981.

== See also ==
- List of National Historic Landmarks in Minnesota
- National Register of Historic Places listings in Minnesota
