= Lamb–Stephens House =

Historic house in Tennessee, United States

- Formerly listed on the U.S. National Register of Historic Places
- Location within Tennessee Location within the United States
- Location: Burke Hollow Rd. 1 1/2 mi. E of Wilson Pike, Franklin, Tennessee
- Coordinates: 35°53′59″N 86°42′32″W
- Area: less than 1 acre (0.40 ha)
- Built: c. 1820, c. 1825 and c. 1900
- Architectural style: Single pen log residence
- MPS: Williamson County MRA
- NRHP reference No.: 88000299

Significant dates
- Added to NRHP: April 13, 1988
- Removed from NRHP: November 18, 2011

The Lamb–Stephens House is a property in Franklin, Tennessee that dates from c. 1820. It was listed on the National Register of Historic Places from 1988 until 2011.

The property has also been known as the Claude Stephens House. It was one of several early log homes that were built in the area of Nolensville. Others were the John Winstead House and the Abram Glenn House. These were "single pen" log residences that were later enlarged and had frame siding added; they were the centers "of farms composed of several hundred acres along the creek bottoms and valleys."

The house was delisted from the National Register in 2011. Delistings usually follow demolition of a building or other serious loss of historic integrity.
