= Ebenezer Campground =

- U.S. National Register of Historic Places
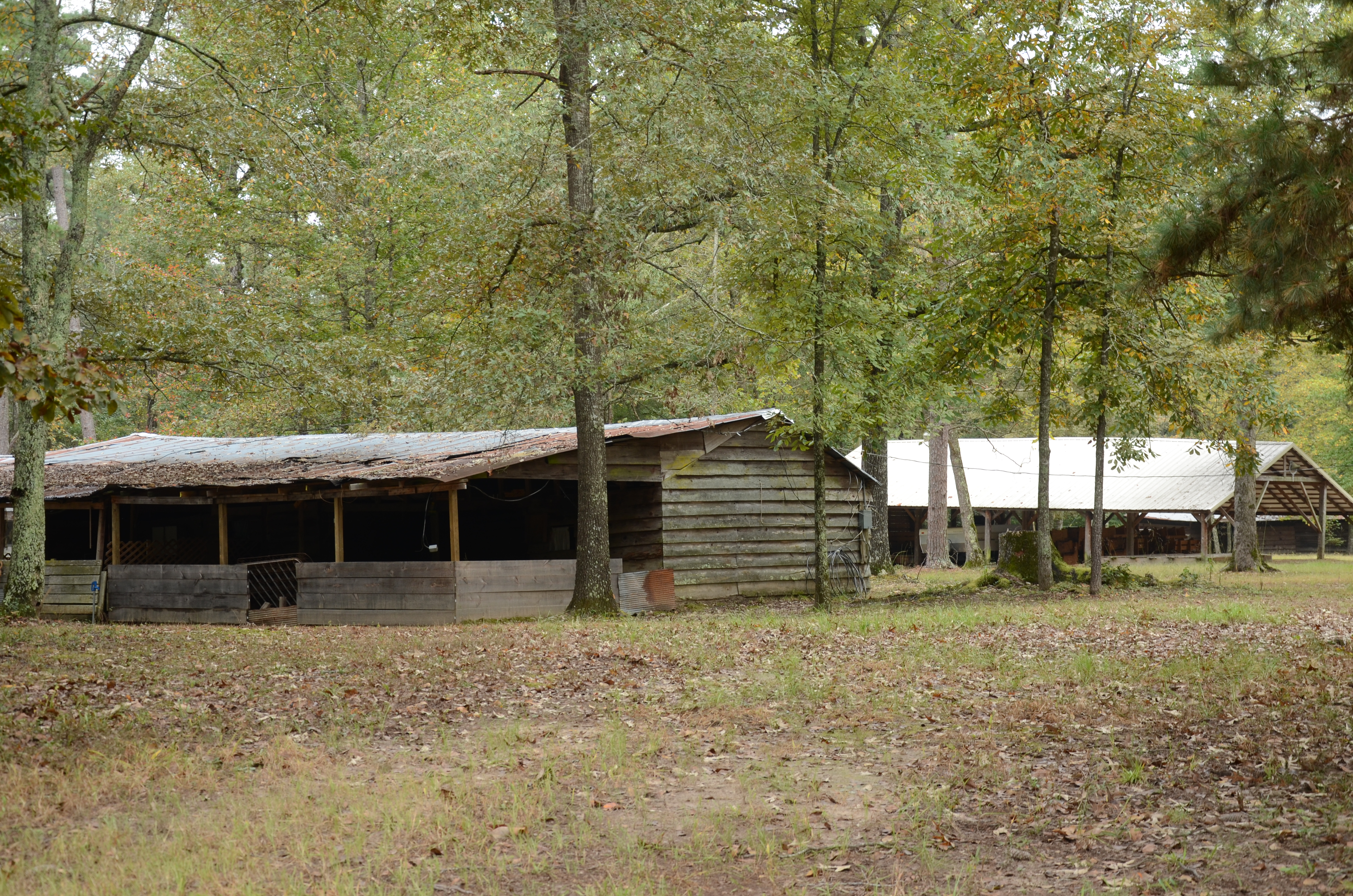

- Location within Arkansas Location within the United States
- Nearest city: Center Point, Arkansas
- Coordinates: 34°3′23″N 93°57′57″W
- Area: 4 acres (1.6 ha)
- Built: 1854
- NRHP reference No.: 76000416
- Added to NRHP: March 26, 1976

The Ebenezer Campground is a historic Methodist summer camp meeting site in rural Howard County, Arkansas. Established in 1854, it is one of the oldest camp meeting sites in Arkansas. It is located in a forest clearing off Arkansas Highway 4 north of Center Point. It has six major structures: a tabernacle, three dormitories, and two minister's cabins. Although all of these structures were built in the 1940s or later, they were built using construction methods reminiscent of previous structures at the camp, and are roughly in the same locations. The tabernacle is a large open structure with a tin roof supported by square posts. The minister's cabins are modest one-room cabins finished with vertical pine boards. The dormitories are long rectangular structures subdivided into areas called "tents". Each "tent" consists of four rooms separated by a breezeway. Three of these rooms serve as bedrooms, while the fourth, which is open on two sides, serves as a dining area. Attached to each "tent" is a shed-roofed kitchen and cooking area. The dormitories have no windows, only openings cut into the horizontal clapboard siding to provide light and ventilation.

The first camp meeting was established in the Center Point area in 1837, but was soon destroyed in windstorm. A second site, established in 1853, was destroyed by fire, and the camp was established at the present site thereafter. It was destroyed by Union Army forces in the American Civil War, the tabernacle was destroyed by wind in 1942, and four of the buildings burned in 1966. After each of these events the buildings affected were rebuilt using traditional frontier techniques.

The camp was listed on the National Register of Historic Places in 1976.

== See also ==
- National Register of Historic Places listings in Howard County, Arkansas
