= Womack–Parker House =

Historic house in Arkansas, United States

- U.S. National Register of Historic Places
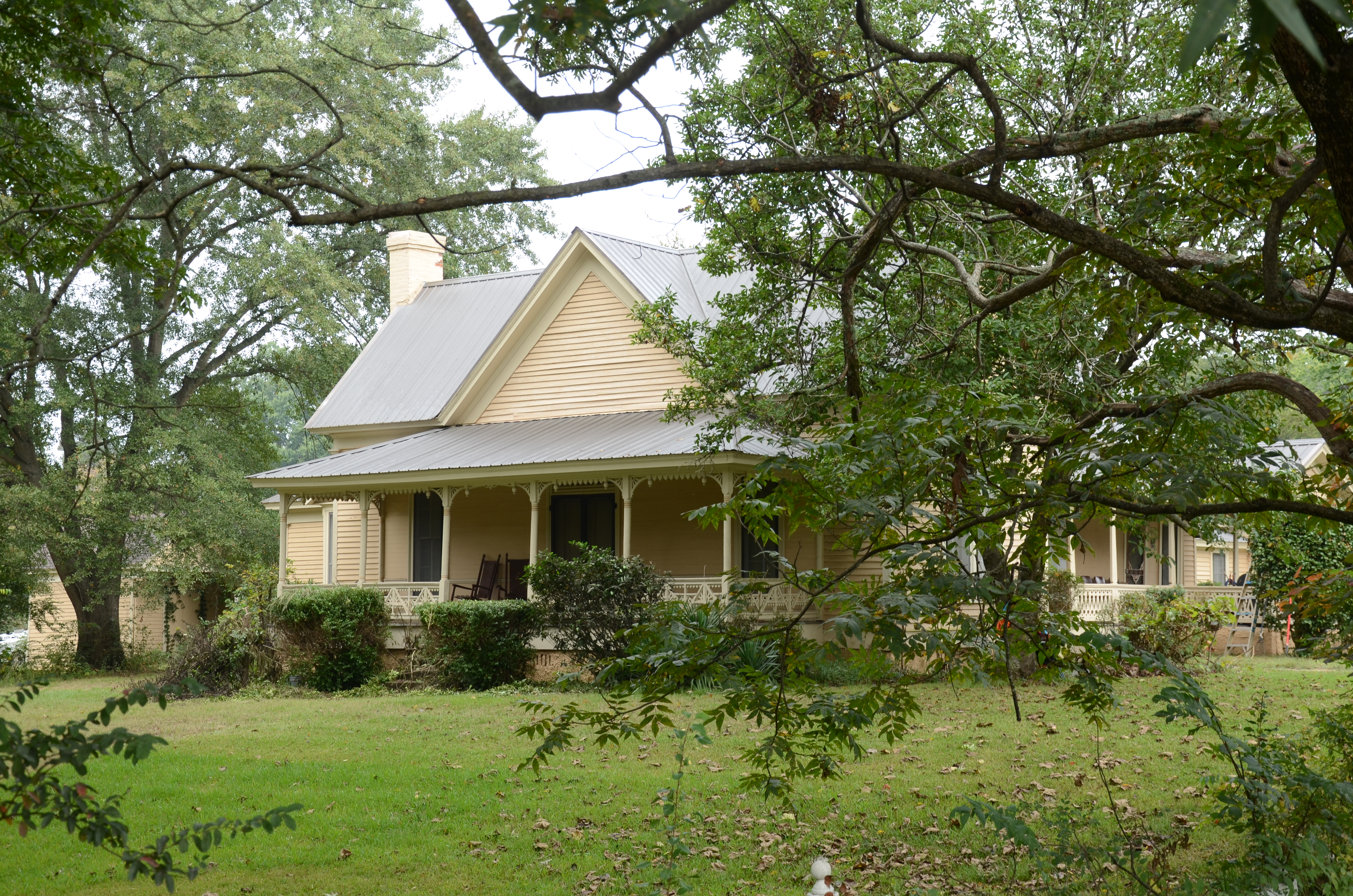

- Location within Arkansas Location within the United States
- Location: Off AR 4, Nashville, Arkansas
- Coordinates: 33°57′14″N 93°50′47″W
- Area: 5.4 acres (2.2 ha)
- Built: 1878
- Architect: David D. Womack
- Architectural style: Stick/eastlake, Greek Revival, Victorian
- NRHP reference No.: 78000594
- Added to NRHP: December 1, 1978

The Womack–Parker House is a historic house off Arkansas Highway 4 in Nashville, Arkansas. The house is notable for its age, its association with one of Nashville's leading businessmen, and for its distinctive architecture. The house is a single block of wood-frame construction with a central hall plan. It has porches with decorative jigsaw woodwork on three sides. Its construction date is uncertain, but it was purchased in 1878 by David Womack and extensively altered. Womack arrived in Howard County in 1849, and operated a highly successful array of businesses, including a lumber mill (which probably provided the woodwork adorning the porches), and a cotton gin. The property on which the house stands also includes a variety of 19th-century log structures.

The house was listed on the National Register of Historic Places in 1978.

== See also ==
- National Register of Historic Places listings in Howard County, Arkansas
