= Nashville Post Office =

- U.S. National Register of Historic Places
- U.S. Historic district – Contributing property
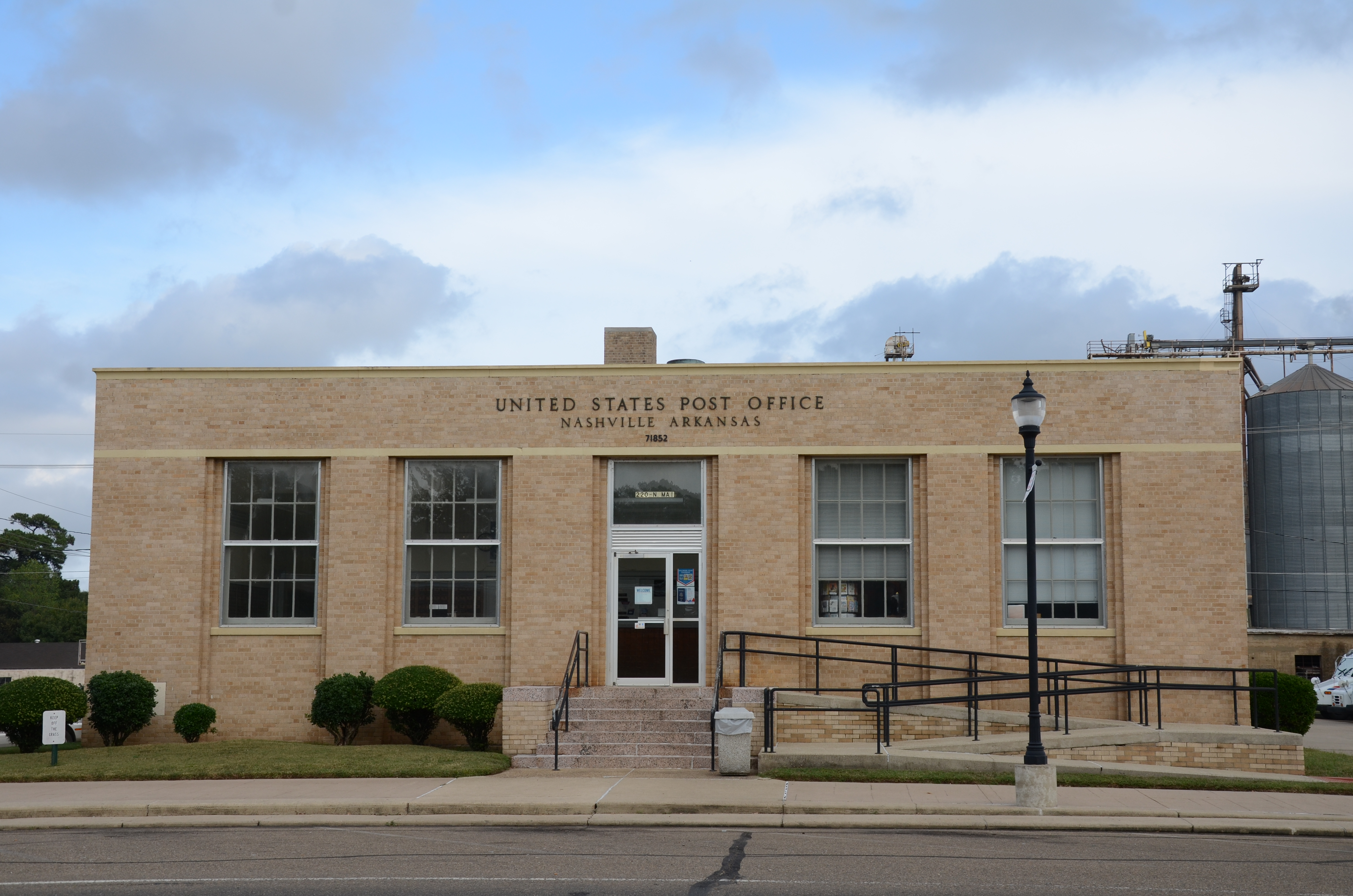

- Location within Arkansas Location within the United States
- Location: 220 N. Main St., Nashville, Arkansas
- Coordinates: 33°56′43″N 93°50′46″W
- Area: less than one acre
- Built: 1937
- Architect: Office of the Supervising Architect under Louis A. Simon, Algeron Blair
- Architectural style: Art Deco, PWA Moderne
- Part of: Nashville Commercial Historic District (ID10000784)
- MPS: Post Offices with Section Art in Arkansas MPS
- NRHP reference No.: 98000913

Significant dates
- Added to NRHP: August 14, 1998
- Designated CP: September 23, 2010

The Nashville Post Office is a historic post office building located at 220 North Main Street in Nashville, Howard County, Arkansas.

The post office was built during 1936–1937.

== Description ==
It is a single-story brick building, roughly square in shape, with very restrained Art Deco and PWA Moderne styling. The main entrance (facing west) is flanked by pilasters, and topped by two courses of windows also flanked by pilasters, each stepped back from the lower level.

The public lobby area inside is decorated with a mural, painted in 1939 by John Tazewell Robertson, entitled Peach Growing. The mural was funded by the Treasury Section of Fine Arts.

The building was listed on the National Register of Historic Places in 1998.

== See also ==
- National Register of Historic Places listings in Howard County, Arkansas
- List of United States post offices
- List of United States post office murals
