= Logging camp =

Logging industry work site

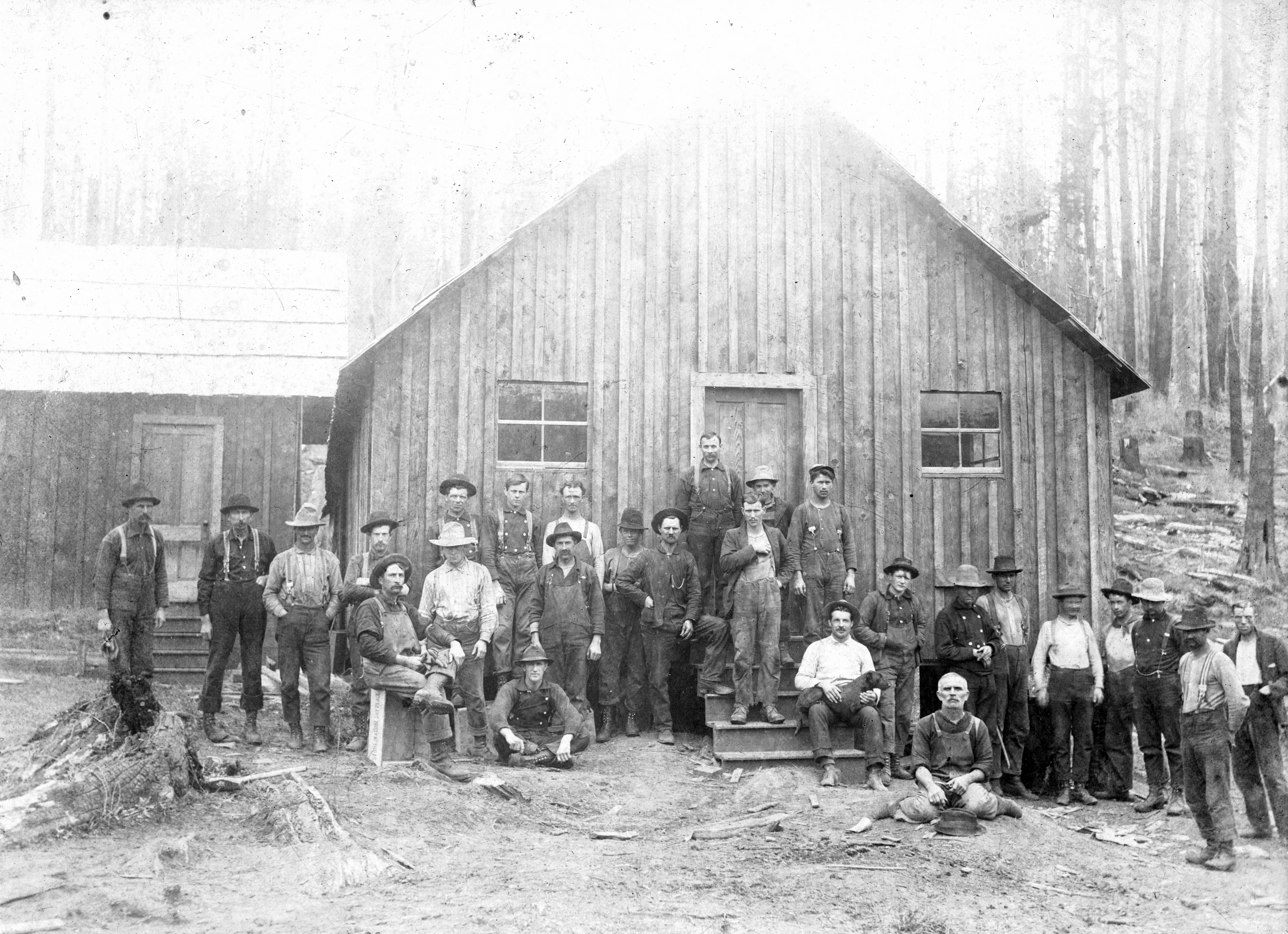
Lumberjacks in front of logging camp building

A logging camp (or lumber camp) is a transitory work site used in the logging industry. Before the second half of the 20th century, these camps were the primary place where lumberjacks and their families would live and work to fell trees in a particular area. Many places' names (i.e., Bockman Lumber Camp, Whitestone Logging Camp, Camp Douglas) are legacies of old logging camps.

Logging camps were often placed next to river tributaries so that the winter's log harvest could be floated to the lumber mills in the spring. One of the example on this innovation was in the Comox Valley Logging Camps, which located by the Courtenay and Campbell River.

== Design and modelling ==
The requirements of the logging industry involved the creation of a working site and housing from the pristine wilderness. The construction of the logging camp consisted of a transformation of the natural environment to the built environment. Logging was seasonal in nature, with farmers often working as lumberjacks during the winter. Camps were placed next to a river so that the logs harvested could be floated to the lumber mills in the spring. By their nature logging camps were temporary work sites used to harvest lumber in remote areas. Once the lumber in a particular area was harvested, the lumberjacks would move on.

The location of the sites and the number of the camps were a serious business that demanded proper logistical planning. Many factors were taken into consideration like transportation routes, costs and sizes would be allocated into the planning of each logging camp in order to maximize the profit for the firm. Moreover, some firms decided to harvest during both seasons. Thus, created the need for a more efficient methods to transport machines, workers and merchandises.

Primitive sites had two buildings, a cookhouse and a bunkhouse. Larger camps also had an outhouse, barn, blacksmith shop, filer shack (to sharpen the saws), office and camp store. Lumber cut by the lumberjacks was the source of the materials for the buildings, and camps were built in the fall prior to the winter logging season. Most of the lumberjacks would return to their jobs after the logging season, with a few staying on to drive logs in the spring.

In the United States, logging camps were phased out after World War II, as work crews could more easily be transported to remote logging sites. In Canada, logging camps like the ones on Comox, Vancouver, BC were also being phased out after World War II. This was mainly due to labour strikes and disputes which led to the closure of many sites that were belonged to the Canadian Western Lumber Company.

== Camp food ==
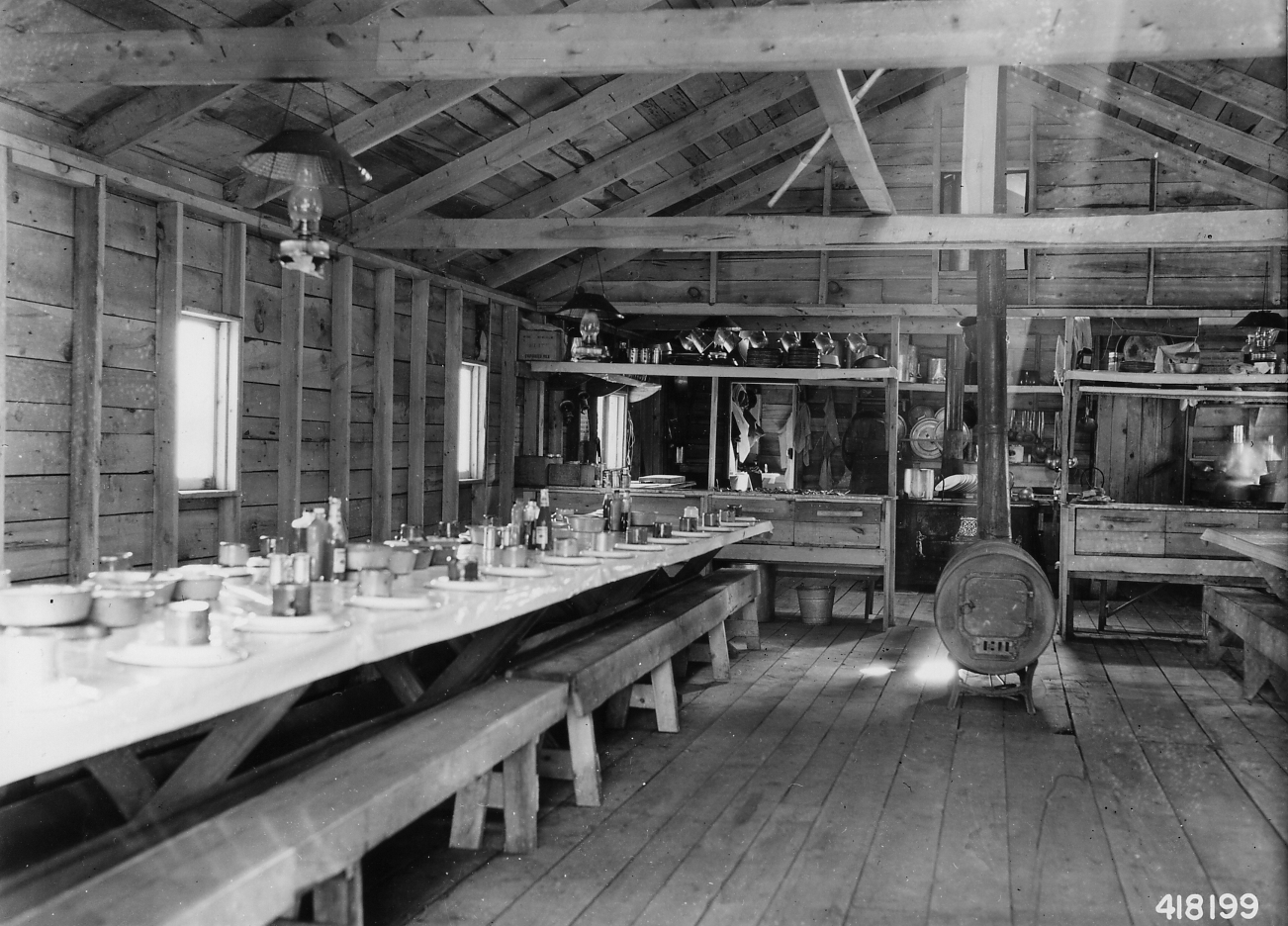
Mess hall at a logging camp

Lumberjacks could work upwards of twelve hours a day, and lumbering was such physically demanding work that each man could eat between 6,000 and 9,000 calories a day. In one estimation, the average logger consumed 5 pounds (2.3 kg) of food each day. Quality and quantity were important parts of maintaining the health and productivity of the workers. Meat, other foods high in protein, and fats were served in abundance. Sack lunches were provided to the loggers. During peak season, as many as five meals a day could be served. Camp cooks were important to the morale of the workers. In some cases, workers would follow a cook to the camp they were working at each season.

In Canada, the long distances to the camps and the closure of most access during the winter led to the development of depot farms that would be built near logging camps to supply cereals and vegetables to the loggers as well as food for horses in the form of hay and oats. These farms were often built on poor quality land and had little output other than the camps and self-consumption, and most often closed as soon as the camp did.

== Camp life ==
Although many camp sites were used as temporary shelters, it did not prevent the men from bringing their families with them. Many brought their wives and children along to these expeditions and they formed their own communities. As the communities became larger in size, so were the social aspects.

The historical gaps existed in these camps belonging to race and gender were pressing issues. Many believed that they were not being treated equally. During the work day, the hierarchy in labour was showing through the workload passed down to the coloured workers and even the indigenous people who participated in these labour camps. Labours in these camps existed for one purpose only: to produce and be productive for the camps. Because without this aspect, these logging camps would cease to exist. Not only the living labour produced tangible things like felling trees, they were also producing social capital.

The social capital that existed in the logging camps at the time was the product of a continuous process whether the workers like it or not. It also means that some chose to stay in the camps as their permanent home because they got used to the "new" lifestyle. An example is the Moses family, who belonged to the Anishinaabeg tribe. The Moses family demonstrated the hardships and determination they faced on a daily basis, and it is worth noting that Pete Moses and Anne Moses were the first Anishinaabeg to operate their own logging camp.

Women were also rare in these logging camps, as very few women voluntarily gave up their city life to retreat to the wilderness life of many logging camps.Those who chose to go usually ended up as cooks and babysitter, but it was quite often that was because they had no choice. Anne Moses was an example of this. She had to follow her husband to work and live in the logging camp. Her life would be described as a life under the place of social-refugee whenever she entered her logging camp home. To many, their camps were meant to be more than just a place shelter from the weather.

== Strikes and labour disruptions ==
As many workers found themselves to be at home within the logging camps. The social life within these sites was being shaped by its daily activities, including historical gaps in gender and race.

This led to a change in the political economy of these sites. In particular, the Comox camps located in British Colombia were amongst those that were impacted by the lumber industry strikes and labour disruptions. These disruptions started from small strikes related to labour issues like race and unfair workloads, which eventually led to the decline of the industry as a whole in Western Canada.

Another example of how historical gaps in the logging industry affected many logging camps is the Pacific Northwest logging camps. Factors like labour, class, and environmental concerns were being examined to link together the relationship between historical accounts in these camps at the time. The workers were in constant clashes with environmental protectionists, whose activities were aiming to obstruct the work of the camps.

Organized labour unions faced considerable pushback from the industry. The International Woodworker of America (a Communist lead union organization), fought hard for collective bargaining rights in British Columbia's north during World War 2. Post- World War 1, companies in Comox hired local family men farmers in an attempt to keep socialism and unionism out of the workplace.

Identity, politics, and cultural background played a role in the acceptance of unions. A mixed-race Indigenous man who logged in British Columbia's early 20th century, Hank Pennier, criticized unionization. His mixed-race identity allowed him to succeed through understanding he needed to work harder to "stay ahead and be better than another guy", which stood in contrast to a perceived softer union life.

== Indigenous Contributions ==
Lumberjacking and participation in logging camps provided a unique opportunity for Indigenous men to participate in social mobility in the 19th and 20th century. During the Coast Salish logging boom, most men in the surrounding communities spent some time working in the bush, participating as a significant part of logging crews in the province of British Columbia. Logging firms regularly were required to hire men from the communities of the local Indigenous bands.

Tla'amin and Stó:lō men came from a pre-contact tradition where woodworking provided an opportunity for status elevation. They had intergenerational experience with subsistence hunting which contributed to life in bush camps. As an early 20th century Stó:lō logger, Hank Pennier praised the logging camp environment that allowed life skills to be developed and reinforced through rugged masculinity and an intimate connection with nature. He reflects that through logging an Indigenous man could "feel as good as the next guy" if they were able to "put in the extra effort".

See also

- Holt and Balcom Logging Camp No. 1
- Camp 6 Logging Museum
- Man camp
