= Dogtrot house =

Style of house in the US

Floorplan of a typical dogtrot/breezeway house in the Southeastern United States

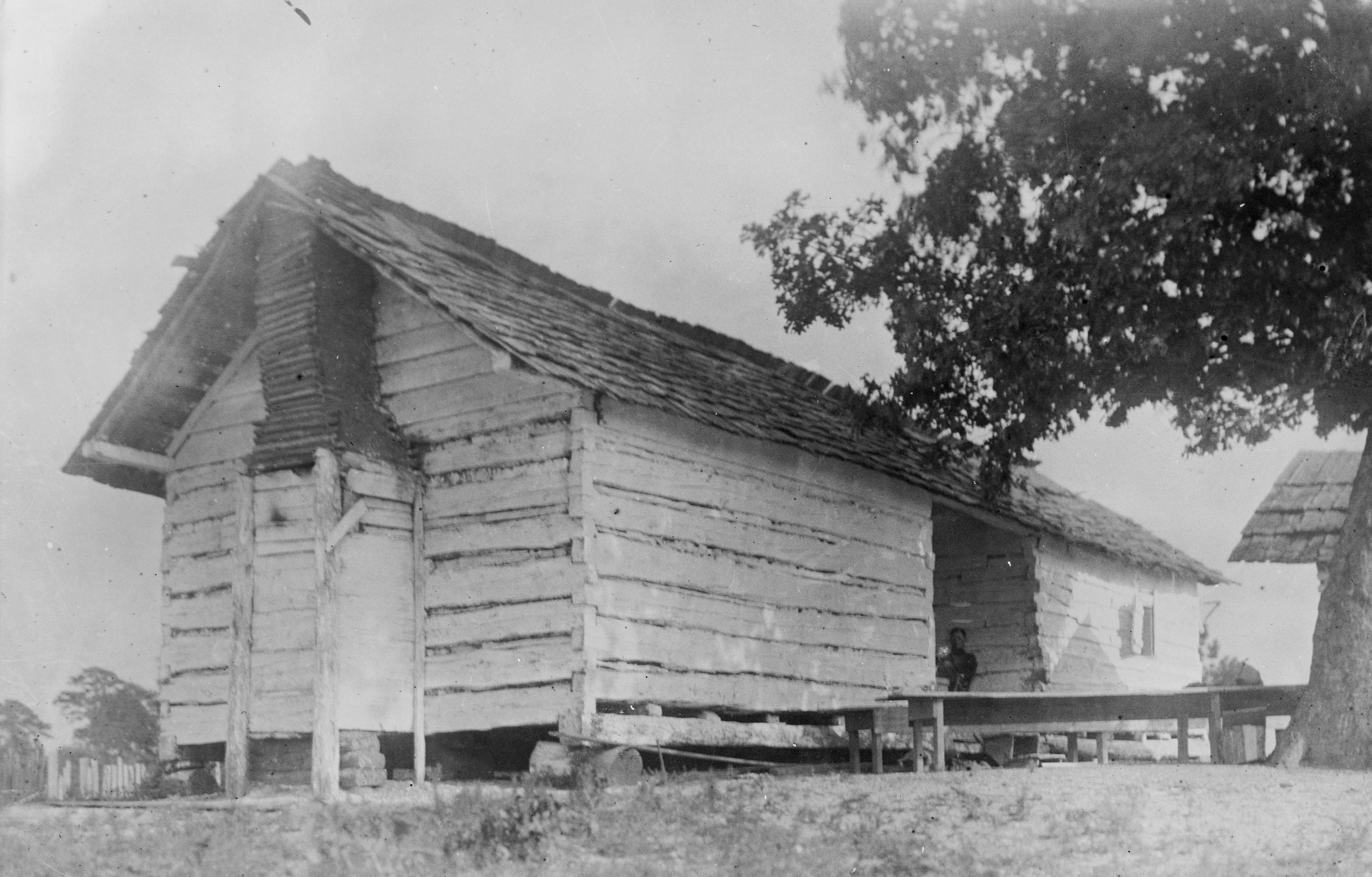
One of several dogtrot houses formerly used as slave quarters at the plantation of Thornhill near Forkland, Alabama. This photograph was taken in 1934; the dwelling was subsequently destroyed. Note the split-shingle roof and stick-and-mud chimney.

The dogtrot, also known as a breezeway house, dog-run, or possum-trot, is a style of house that was common throughout the Southeastern United States during the 19th and early 20th centuries. Some theories place its origins in the southern Appalachian Mountains. Some scholars believe the style developed in the post-Revolution frontiers of Kentucky and Tennessee. Others note its presence in the South Carolina Lowcountry from an early period. The main style point was a large breezeway (instead of a hallway) through the center of the house to cool occupants in the hot southern climate.

Architects continue to design variants of dogtrot houses using modern materials.

== Design ==
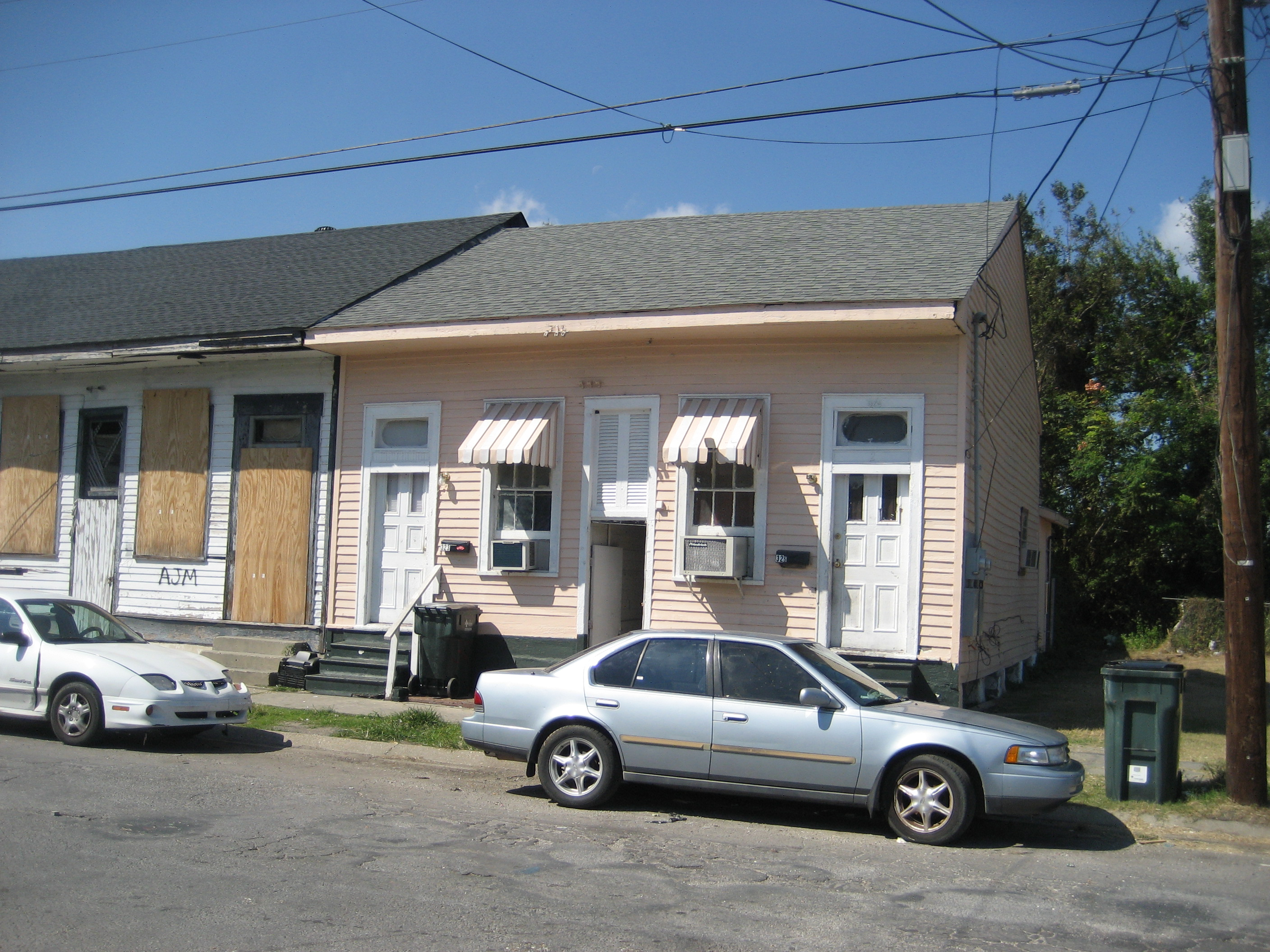
Creole row house with dogtrot, New Orleans

A dogtrot house historically consisted of two log cabins connected by a breezeway or "dogtrot", all under a common roof. Typically, one cabin was used for cooking and dining, while the other was used as a private living space, such as a bedroom. The primary characteristics of a dogtrot house are that it is typically one story (although 1 1/2-story and rarer two-story examples survive), and has at least two rooms, typically 18–20 feet (5.5–6.1 m) wide that each flank an open-ended central hall. Additional rooms usually take the form of a semidetached ell or shed flanking the hall, most commonly at the rear. Enclosed shed rooms are also sometimes found at the front, although a shed-roof front porch is the most common form.

The breezeway through the center of the house is a unique feature, with rooms of the house opening into the breezeway. The breezeway provided a cooler covered area for sitting. The combination of the breezeway and open windows in the rooms of the house allowed outside air to enter the living quarters in the pre–air-conditioning era.

Secondary characteristics of the dogtrot house include placement of the chimneys, staircases, and porches. Chimneys were almost always located at each gable end of the house, with each serving one of the two main rooms. If the house was 1½ or the rarer two stories, the necessary staircase was usually at least partially enclosed or boxed in. The stairway was most commonly placed in one or both of the main rooms, although it was sometimes placed in the open hallway. Although some houses had only the open central hall and flanking rooms, most dogtrots had full-width porches to the front and/or rear.

== Surviving public and notable homes ==
=== Alabama ===
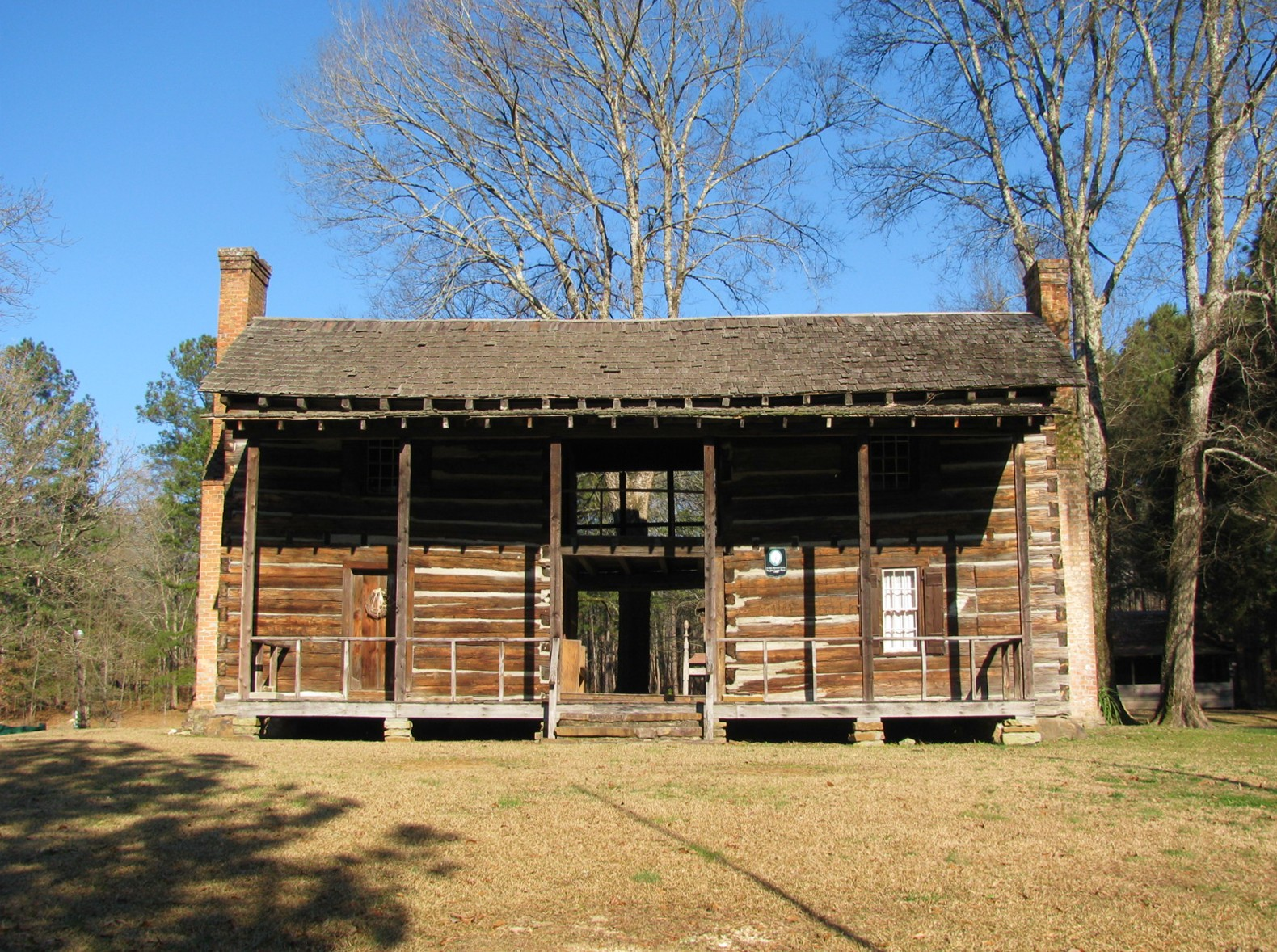
The John Looney House, Ashville, Alabama, in 2010

The John Looney House in Ashville, Alabama, is a rare example of a two-story dogtrot house built in the 1820s.

=== Arizona ===
Another example of a dogtrot house can be viewed at the old Brill ranch (Arizona state historical site), 3 miles\5 kilometers south of Wickenburg, Arizona. The original core of the adobe house is still standing and being used as a Visitor Center for a nature preserve. The house was built sometime between the 1850s to 1860s and was later used at The Garden of Allah dude ranch.

=== Arkansas ===
The Jacob Wolf House, a two-story dogtrot home, was constructed around 1820 in Norfork. It is the oldest known standing structure in the state. Wolf was an early pioneer in Baxter County and his house was designated as a county seat and courthouse in 1825 by the territorial legislature.

The Noel Owen Neal House was built in 1840 near Nashville. Neal, a farmer, died in 1850. His wife Hesky maintained the farm after his death. The house was moved to Washington, Arkansas, and has undergone restoration.

Around 1855, Colonel Randolph D. Casey built the Casey House, currently the oldest existing house in Mountain Home. The home is currently maintained by the Baxter County Historical and Genealogical Society.

The Arkansas Post Museum includes the Refeld-Hinman home, a log-cabin dogtrot house built in 1877.

=== Kentucky ===
In 1800, Jacob Eversole, of what is now Perry County, Kentucky, constructed an addition to the one-room cabin he had erected in 1789, creating a two-story dogtrot home. The home is currently owned by Eversole's descendants.

=== Louisiana ===
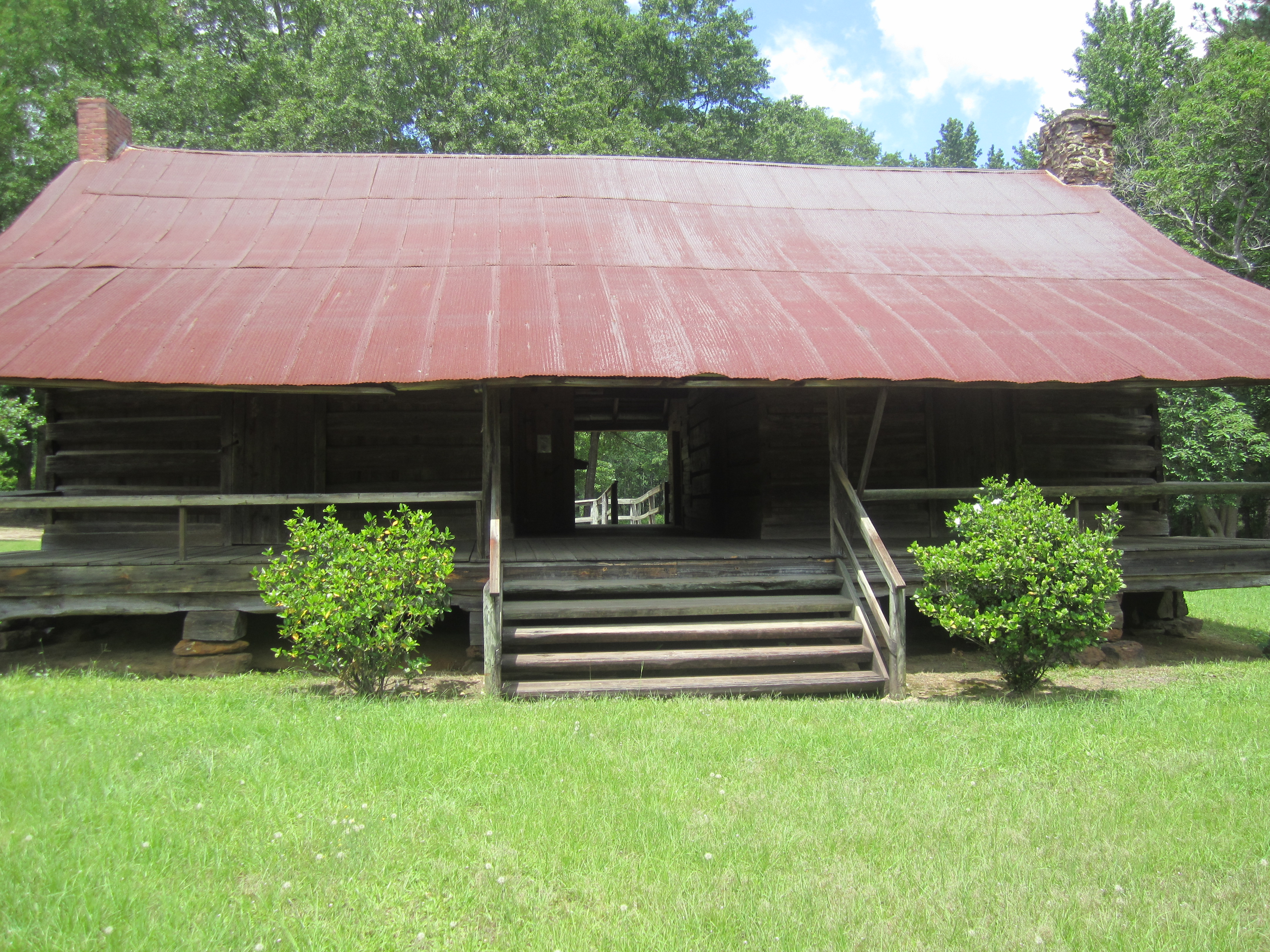
The Autrey House, Dubach, Louisiana, in 2011

The town of Dubach in Lincoln Parish, has several surviving dogtrot houses. In 1990, it was recognized as the "Dogtrot Capital of the World" by the state legislature. The Autrey House Museum, a dogtrot house built in 1849, is located in Dubach; the home is believed to be the oldest extant structure in Lincoln Parish.

At Louisiana State University in Shreveport, the Pioneer Heritage Center hosts the Thrasher House, a two-room dogtrot house built in 1850 by Thomas Zilks near Castor, Louisiana. The home was moved to LSUS in 1981.

The Museum of West Louisiana in Leesville includes the Alexander Airhart Home, a dogtrot house.

The LSU Rural Life Museum in Baton Rouge includes a restored dogtrot house built by Thomas Neal Sr. from the 1860s to the early 1870s in Rapides Parish. The home was lived in by descendants of Mr. Neal until 1976, and was moved to the museum in 1979.

Washington Parish, hosts the Sylvest House. This home, built in 1880 by Nehemiah Sylvest, was originally located in Fisher, Louisiana, but has since been moved to the fairgrounds in Franklinton.

The O'Pry/Elam dogtrot house near Pleasant Hill, Sabine Parish, is a framed four-room dogtrot featuring an interior chimney. This house is the only remaining structure of the original village of Pleasant Hill and served as a hospital after the Battle of Pleasant Hill.

=== Mississippi ===
In Tunica, the Tunica Museum owns and operates the Tate Log House, a log-cabin dogtrot home built in 1840. This home is the oldest surviving structure in the county.

=== North Carolina ===
The Tarkil Branch Farm's Homestead Museum, a private living-history museum in Duplin, includes a dogtrot house built in the 1830s.

=== Oklahoma ===
The Old Choate House Museum in Indianola is a story-and-a-half dogtrot house that once belonged to a past Choctaw Senate president.

=== Texas ===
Fanthorp Inn State Historic Site is a historic hotel in Anderson, Texas, originally built as a dogtrot-style cedar cabin that was enlarged in about 1850 to accommodate its usage as a hotel and store. The Texas Parks and Wildlife Department acquired the 6-acre (2.4 ha) site by purchase in 1977 from a Fanthorp descendant. On July 3, 1845, Kenneth Lewis Anderson, vice-president of the Republic of Texas died from illness at the Inn while en route home from Washington-on-the-Brazos.

The Barrington Living History Museum in Washington-on-the-Brazos, which demonstrates life in mid-19th century Texas, has as its centerpiece the Anson Jones home, a four-room dogtrot cabin built by Dr. Anson Jones, the last president of the Republic of Texas. This home was moved to the site in 1936.

The Log Cabin Village, a living history village owned and operated by the city of Fort Worth, includes the restored Parker Cabin, which was built by a relative of Cynthia Ann Parker in 1848.

The Dallas Heritage Village, in Dallas hosts a dogtrot house built in the winter of 1845-1846 near what is now the Dallas/Fort Worth International Airport. This dogtrot was originally a log cabin, but was later covered in clapboard.

The Sterne-Hoya House was built in Nacogdoches, in 1830 by Texas Revolution leader Adolphus Sterne as a dogtrot, although the open breezeway was later enclosed.

On site at the East Texas Arboretum sits the Wofford House, built in 1850 by B. W. J. Wofford. The now-restored home was moved to the arboretum in 2001 from Henderson County.

The Sam Houston Memorial Museum in Huntsville, has two dogtrot cabins. The Woodland House, the most important structure at the museum, was constructed in 1847 by Sam Houston when he was serving as one of Texas's first United States Senators. and has siding-over-log construction. The Bear Bend Cabin, a four-room, story-and-a-half log cabin, was built by Sam Houston as a hunting lodge in the 1850s.

The Gaines-Oliphint House, located in Hemphill, is a story-and-a-half dogtrot built by James Gaines, one of the earliest Anglo settlers in Texas. The home was built some time between 1818 and 1849, and is currently owned by a chapter of the Daughters of the Republic of Texas.

== See also ==
- Crib barn
- Central-passage house
- Shotgun house
