= Nashville Commercial Historic District =

Historic district in Arkansas, United States

- U.S. National Register of Historic Places
- U.S. Historic district
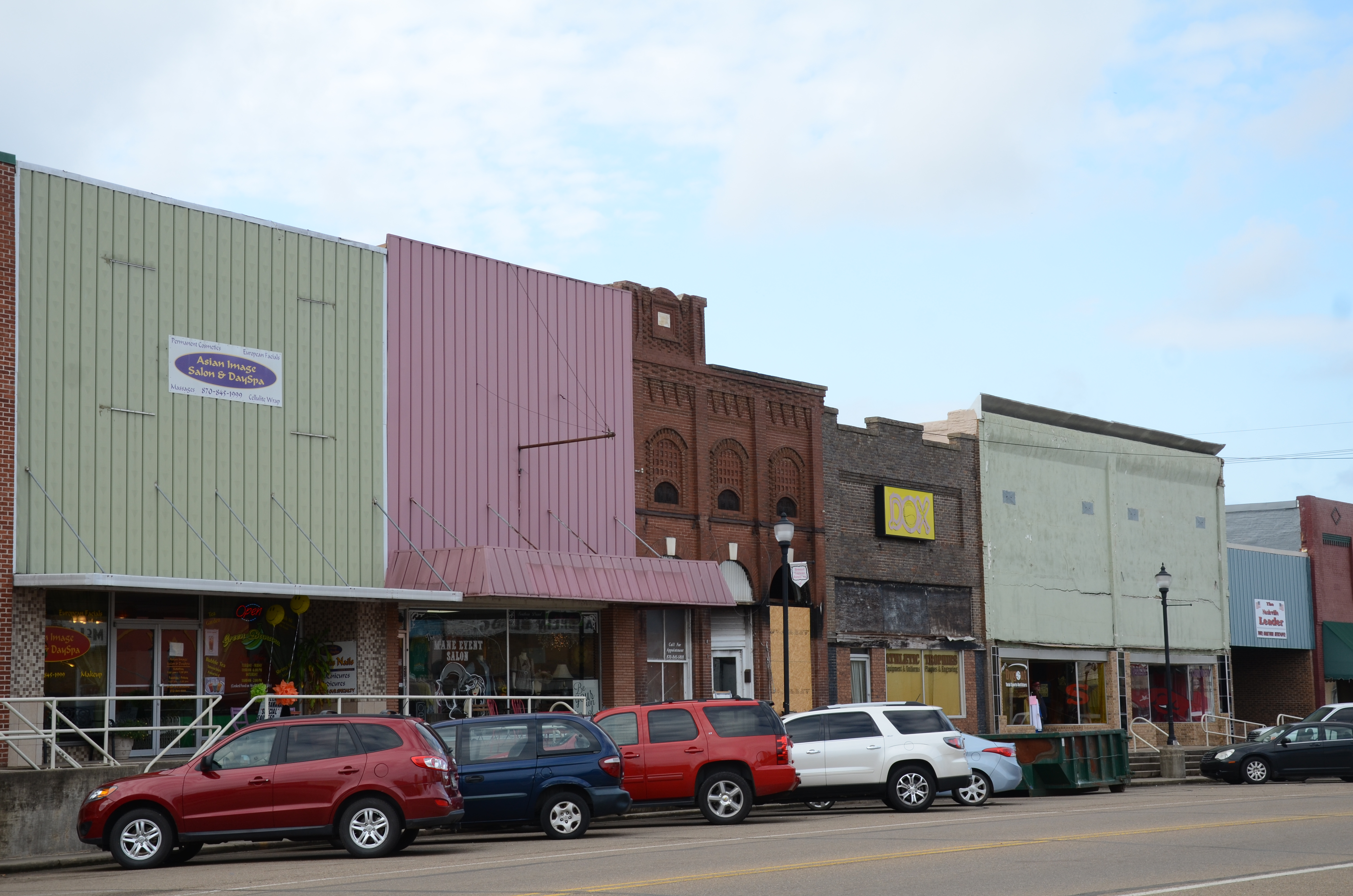

- Location within Arkansas Location within the United States
- Location: Bounded roughly by Shepherd St., Missouri Pacific Railroad, Hempstead St. and Second St., Nashville, Arkansas
- Coordinates: 33.94392°N 93.8471°W
- Area: 9 acres (3.6 ha)
- NRHP reference No.: 10000784
- Added to NRHP: September 23, 2010

The Nashville Commercial Historic District encompasses much of the historic downtown commercial area of Nashville, Arkansas, and the major commercial center in Howard County. It is centered at the junction of Main and Howard Streets, extending eastward along East Howard, and north and south along Main Street for about one block. Most of the buildings in the district are tall single-story brick structures, some covered in stucco. They were built between about 1895 and the 1930s, with a smaller number appearing later. The area's economic activity was driven first by the arrival of the railroad, which defined the layout of the town, and then by the growth of lumber and agriculture (particularly the development of peach orchards) in the region. The oldest building in the district is 203 North Main, built c. 1895 with modest Romanesque Revival styling.

The district was listed on the National Register of Historic Places in 2010. It includes the separately-listed Nashville Post Office.

== See also ==
- National Register of Historic Places listings in Howard County, Arkansas
