= National Register of Historic Places listings in Howard County, Arkansas =

Location of Howard County in Arkansas

Howard County, Arkansas, United States, has 13 properties listed on the National Register of Historic Places. Six other properties were once listed but have been removed.

The locations of National Register properties for which the latitude and longitude coordinates are included below, may be seen in a map.

Contents: Counties in Arkansas
- Arkansas
- Ashley
- Baxter
- Benton
- Boone
- Bradley
- Calhoun
- Carroll
- Chicot
- Clark
- Clay
- Cleburne
- Cleveland
- Columbia
- Conway
- Craighead
- Crawford
- Crittenden
- Cross
- Dallas
- Desha
- Drew
- Faulkner
- Franklin
- Fulton
- Garland
- Grant
- Greene
- Hempstead
- Hot Spring
- Howard
- Independence
- Izard
- Jackson
- Jefferson
- Johnson
- Lafayette
- Lawrence
- Lee
- Lincoln
- Little River
- Logan
- Lonoke
- Madison
- Marion
- Miller
- Mississippi
- Monroe
- Montgomery
- Nevada
- Newton
- Ouachita
- Perry
- Phillips
- Pike
- Poinsett
- Polk
- Pope
- Prairie
- Pulaski (Little Rock)
- Randolph
- St. Francis
- Saline
- Scott
- Searcy
- Sebastian
- Sevier
- Sharp
- Stone
- Union
- Van Buren
- Washington
- White
- Woodruff
- Yell

This National Park Service list is complete through NPS recent listings posted February 13, 2026.

== Current listings ==
	Name on the Register	Image	Date listed	Location	City or town	Description
1	Ebenezer Campground	Ebenezer Campground	March 26, 1976 (#76000416)	North of Center Point off Highway 4; 34°03′23″N 93°57′57″W	Center Point	
2	First Presbyterian Church	First Presbyterian Church	May 4, 1976 (#76000418)	2nd and Hempstead Sts. 33°56′33″N 93°50′54″W	Nashville	
3	Garrett Whiteside Hall	Garrett Whiteside Hall	November 21, 1994 (#94001340)	Southwestern corner of the junction of N. 3rd Ave. and Lockesburg St. 33°57′01″N 93°50′59″W	Nashville	
4	Elbert W. Holt House	Elbert W. Holt House	September 20, 1984 (#84000901)	902 N. Main St. 33°57′35″N 93°51′11″W	Nashville	
5	Flavius Holt House	Flavius Holt House	December 1, 1978 (#78000593)	Kohler St. 33°57′05″N 93°50′39″W	Nashville	
6	Howard County Courthouse	Howard County Courthouse	June 14, 1990 (#90000902)	Junction of N. Main St. and Bishop St. 33°56′52″N 93°50′51″W	Nashville	
7	Memphis, Paris, and Gulf Depot	Memphis, Paris, and Gulf Depot	December 4, 1978 (#78000592)	Highway 27; 33°52′32″N 93°54′40″W	Mineral Springs	
8	Mineral Springs Waterworks	Mineral Springs Waterworks	May 29, 2007 (#07000473)	South of the junction of W. Runnels and S. Hall; 33°52′30″N 93°55′17″W	Mineral Springs	
9	Nashville American Legion Building	Nashville American Legion Building	September 13, 1990 (#90001463)	Highway 27, west of Main St. 33°56′01″N 93°51′01″W	Nashville	
10	Nashville Commercial Historic District	Nashville Commercial Historic District	September 23, 2010 (#10000784)	Bounded roughly by Shepherd St., Missouri Pacific Railroad, Hempstead St. and Second St. 33°56′38″N 93°50′50″W	Nashville	
11	Nashville Post Office	Nashville Post Office	August 14, 1998 (#98000913)	220 N. Main St. 33°56′43″N 93°50′46″W	Nashville	
12	Old Corinth Cemetery	Old Corinth Cemetery	May 11, 2012 (#12000022)	AR 26; 34°02′39″N 93°50′24″W	Center Point vicinity	
13	Womack-Parker House	Womack-Parker House	December 1, 1978 (#78000594)	Off Highway 4; 33°57′14″N 93°50′47″W	Nashville	

== Former listings ==
	Name on the Register	Image	Date listed	Date removed	Location	City or town	Description
1	Adam Boyd House		May 13, 1976 (#76000415)	September 23, 2011	East of Center Point on Highway 26; 34°01′33″N 93°56′36″W	Center Point	Destroyed by fire
2	Clardy-Lee House	Clardy-Lee House	November 10, 1977 (#77000255)	September 23, 2011	Highway 26; 34°01′26″N 93°57′38″W	Center Point	
3	DeQueen and Eastern Railroad Depot - Dierks		June 11, 1992 (#92000607)	March 31, 2000	E of Herman Ave.	Dierks	
4	First Christian Church		November 4, 1982 (#82000831)	September 24, 2010	N Main St. 33°56′55″N 93°50′47″W	Nashville	Delisted due to major alterations
5	Missouri Pacific Railroad Depot		June 11, 1992 (#92000618)	September 17, 1999	S of E. Hempstead St., between S. Front and S. Ansley Sts.	Nashville	
6	Noel Owen Neal House		September 27, 2003 (#03000959)	January 26, 2006	184 S Blue Bayou Rd. 33°46′42″N 93°40′43″W	Nashville	Delisted due to relocation to Washington, Arkansas, and significant remodeling
7	Russey-Murray House		May 4, 1976 (#76000417)	September 23, 2011	South of Center Point on Highway 4; 34°00′12″N 93°56′14″W	Center Point	
8	Tollette Shop Building		September 27, 2003 (#03000953)	May 28, 2010	Town Hall Dr. 33°48′56″N 93°53′56″W	Tollette	

== See also ==
- List of National Historic Landmarks in Arkansas
- National Register of Historic Places listings in Arkansas
