= Holt and Balcom Logging Camp No. 1 =

- U.S. National Register of Historic Places
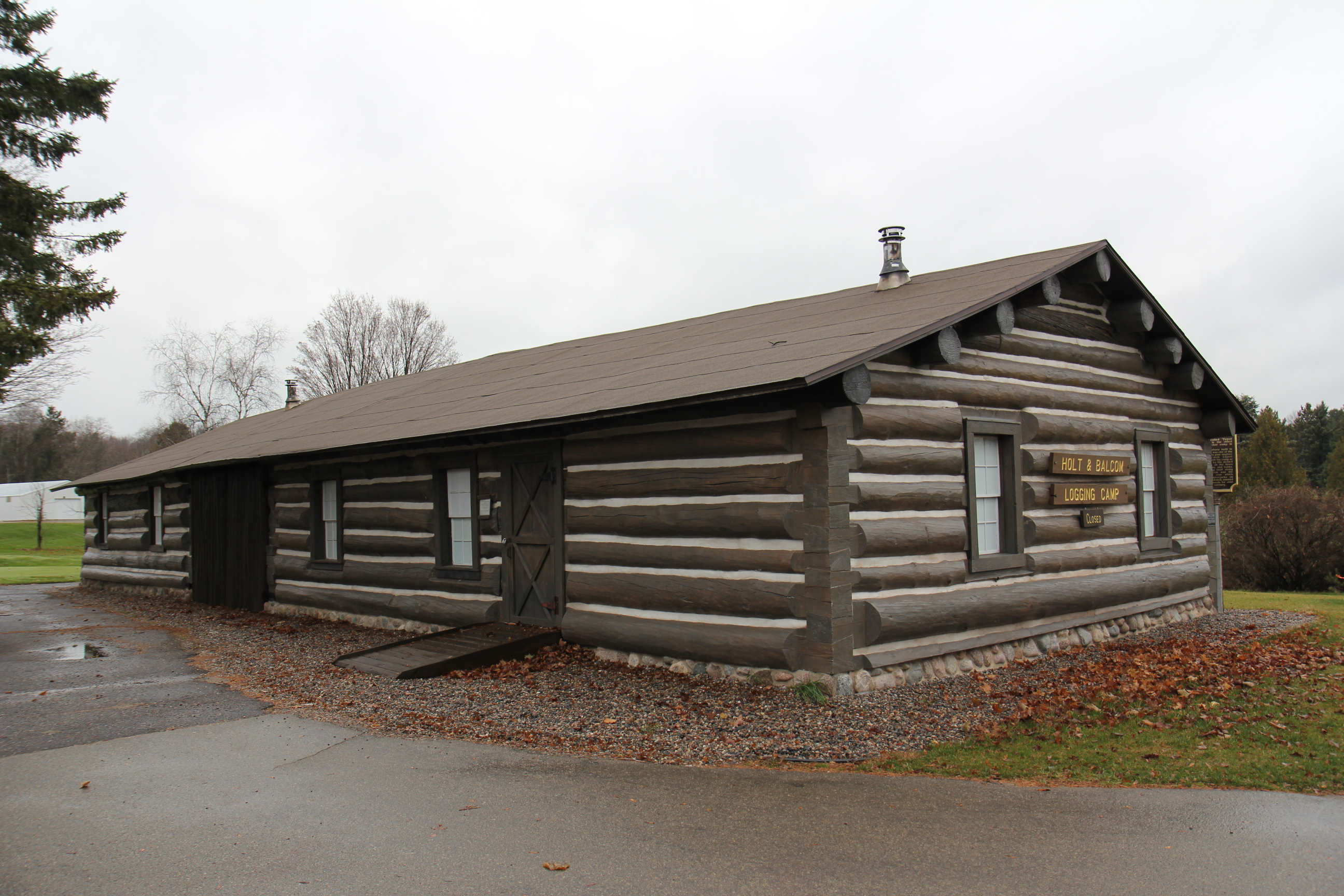
- Location: Lakewood, Wisconsin
- NRHP reference No.: 78000121
- Added to NRHP: December 22, 1978

The Holt and Balcom Logging Camp No. 1 in Lakewood, Wisconsin was built around 1880 in what was then timber along McCaslin Brook. It is probably the oldest lumber camp in Wisconsin still standing in its original location, and was added to the National Register of Historic Places in 1978.

== Background ==
The Holt-Balcom Lumber Company was organized in 1862, with headquarters in Chicago. Devillo Holt was a New Yorker who came west to Mackinac Island around 1843 for a job with the American Fur Company, then moved to Chicago in 1847 to operate a lumber yard. Uri Balcom was a lumberman from out east who came to Oconto in 1856 to continue logging. Their 1862 company held timber land in Marinette and Oconto counties and promptly opened a branch office and sawmill in Oconto.

At that time much of northeast Wisconsin was still covered with forests of virgin timber, and Holt-Balcom proceeded to cut the white pine logs from the tracts that they owned. By 1880 they had reached McCaslin Brook, a tributary of the Oconto River fifty miles upstream from their sawmill. They built splash dams on the brook, and built the logging camp that is the subject of this article on a rise about 80 feet from the brook. Now the camp looks out across the very domestic McCaslin Brook Golf and Country Club, but in the 1880s it would have been surrounded by wilderness - tall trees and brush.

It is said that Ernest Livingston and Henderson Bateman constructed the camp. They cut white pine right there, peeled the logs, and built the walls from them. The logs are eight to sixteen inches in diameter, notched at the ends so that the corners tie together in dovetail joints. The east end is a cook house 36 by 26 feet. The west end is the bunk house, 26 by 26 feet. One long roof covers both "pens," with an open dogtrot between them, then commonly called "the dingle." The floors are hand-sawn planks. The original roof was probably cedar or pine shakes, but now it is plank boarding with tar paper.

In most of the logging camps of northern Wisconsin, the action was in the winter. The crew moved in around November 15 as things were freezing up, so that sleighs of logs could be hauled across frozen swamps, and so the tracks could be iced to ease hauling. Through the winter, teams of men felled trees, limbed them, and sawed them into lengths of ten to sixteen feet. Then they hauled them with oxen or horses to a "skidway" on the bank of a stream, where they were "banked" in big piles for the rest of the winter. In spring, with the streams swollen, the woodsmen rolled the logs down into the water, to be driven downstream to the sawmill. Men typically left camp around the first of April.

Around 1900, Camp #1 was no longer an outpost in the forest, but included a blacksmith shop, a horse barn, a warehouse for supplying Holt-Balcom's operations, a vegetable garden to supply Holt-Balcom's kitchens, and pasture and hay fields to support their horses. It was called "Depot Camp," because it stored supplies, and "McCaslin Brook Farm" because of the horse barn and fields. The company operated the camp until 1929.

In 1949 the Holt Lumber Company gave the camp to the Oconto Historical Society. The McCaslin Lions Club stabilized and restored the bunk house and cook house in the 1970s. Today it is a museum, with the track of the company's old supply road still visible between the building and the brook.
