= Mineral Springs station (Arkansas) =

- Memphis, Paris, and Gulf Depot
- U.S. National Register of Historic Places
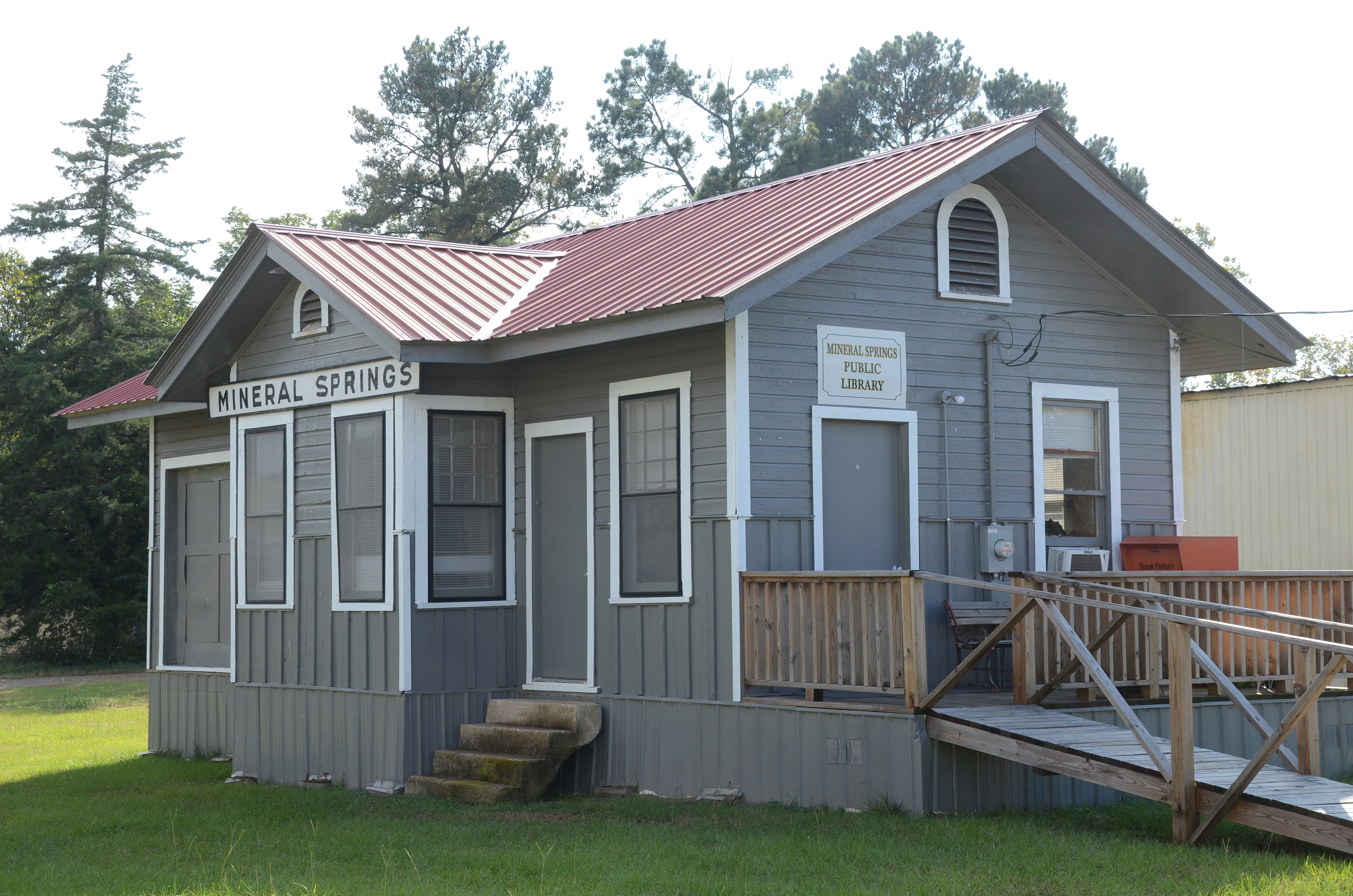

- Location within Arkansas Location within the United States
- Location: AR 27, Mineral Springs, Arkansas
- Coordinates: 33°52′32″N 93°54′40″W
- Area: less than one acre
- Built: 1908
- Built by: Memphis, Paris and Gulf Railroad
- NRHP reference No.: 78000592
- Added to NRHP: December 4, 1978

The Memphis, Paris, and Gulf Depot is a historic railroad station on Arkansas Highway 27 in Mineral Springs, Arkansas. It is a modest single-story wood-frame structure, with a gable roof. The east elevation has a projecting bay, which housed the telegrapher's office, and a double-width loading entrance. The west side of the building has loading platforms and another double-wide entrance. It was built in 1908 by the Memphis, Paris and Gulf Railroad, a short-lived regional railroad whose objective was to connect Memphis, Tennessee to Paris, Texas, and is the first and only railroad depot to be built in the town.

The depot was listed on the National Register of Historic Places in 1978.

== See also ==
- Memphis, Paris and Gulf Railroad Depot in Ashdown, Arkansas
- National Register of Historic Places listings in Howard County, Arkansas
