= Lemon Wond Holt House =

Historic house in Hawaii, United States

- Gladys Tam Ah Lin, wife of Lemon Wond "Rusty" Holt House
- U.S. National Register of Historic Places
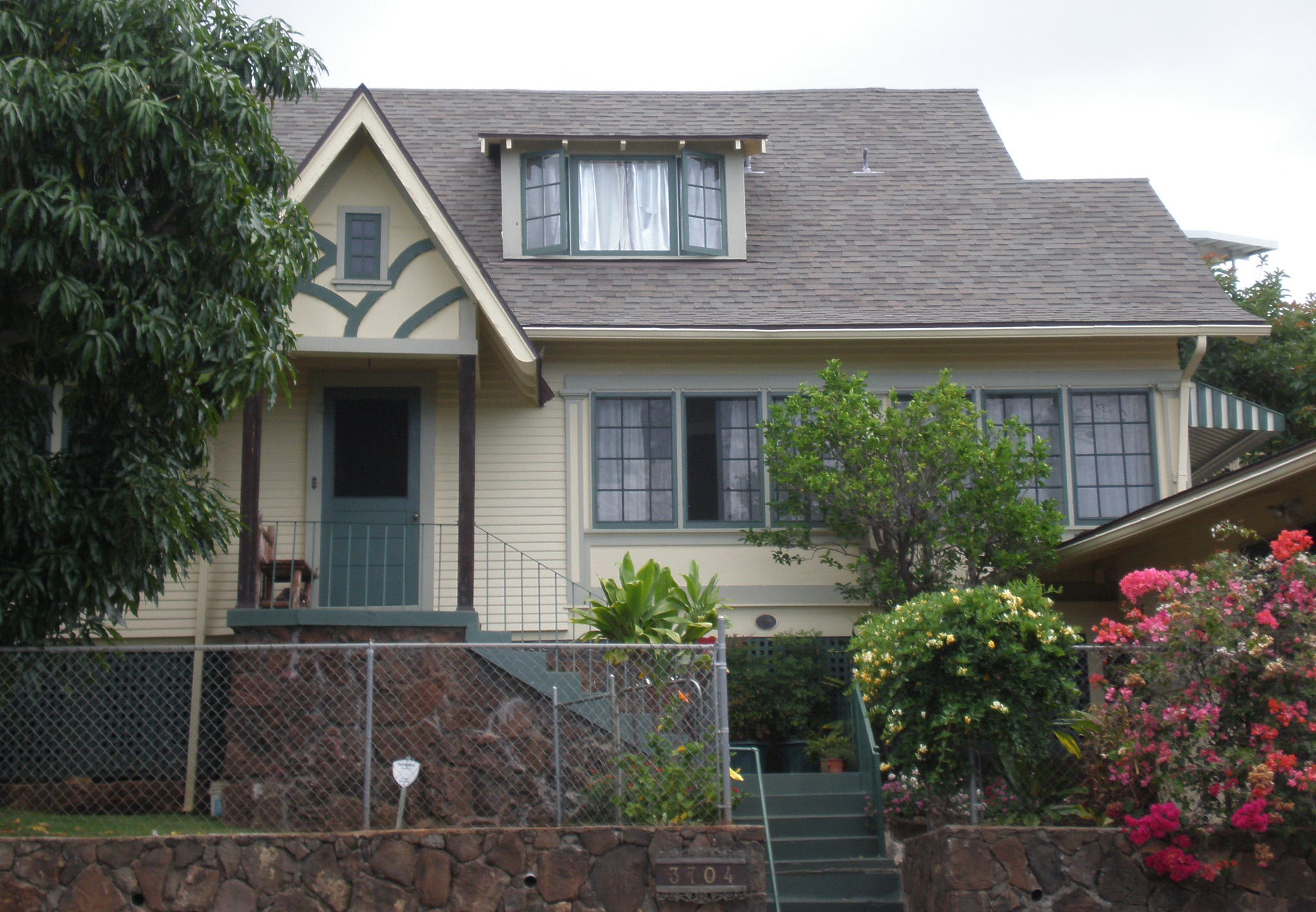
- Lemon Wond Holt House

- Location within Hawaii
- Location: 3704 Anuhea St., Honolulu, Hawaii
- Coordinates: 21°17′11″N 157°47′42″W
- Area: 0.5 acres (0.20 ha)
- Built: 1920s
- Architectural style: "fantasy picturesque"
- NRHP reference No.: 06000422
- Added to NRHP: May 24, 2006

The Lemon Wond Holt House at 3704 Anuhea Street in Honolulu, Hawaiʻi, belonged to Lemon Wond Holt, nicknamed “Rusty” (22 September 1904 – 12 March 1999), one of the last surviving local-born members of the “Stonewall Gang” who frequented Waikiki Beach during the early 1900s.

Architecturally, the house is significant as one of the first examples of a "modestly detailed, fantasy picturesque style residence" built in Hawaiʻi during the late 1920s and early 1930s. It is entirely typical for that period—in its materials, methods, craftsmanship, and design—and is one of only a dozen or so such homes that still survive in Honolulu.
