= Chicago, St. Paul, Minneapolis, and Omaha Turntable =

- U.S. National Register of Historic Places
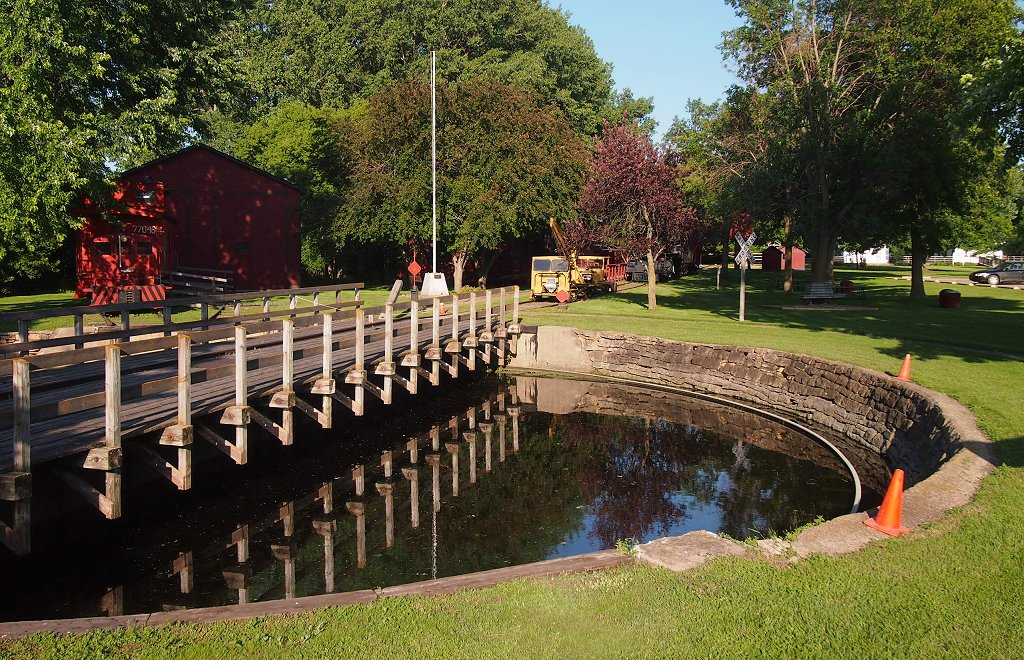

- Location within Minnesota
- Location: County Highway 38, Currie, Minnesota
- Coordinates: 44°04′31″N 95°39′56″W
- Area: less than one acre
- Built: 1901
- Built by: American Bridge Co.
- NRHP reference No.: 77000758
- Added to NRHP: December 12, 1977

The Chicago, St. Paul, Minneapolis, and Omaha Turntable in Currie, Minnesota was built in 1901. It was listed on the National Register of Historic Places in 1977. It has also been known as the Currie Railroad Turntable or the Currie Manually Operated Railroad Turntable.

Built in 1901, it is a manually operated railway turntable built by the American Bridge Company for the end of a Chicago, St. Paul, Minneapolis and Omaha Railway branch line.

There is mention of a railway roundhouse having existed, but no specific evidence this was in fact a roundhouse as opposed to a single engine workshop/shed.
