= Samuel and Geneva Holt Farmstead =

- U.S. National Register of Historic Places
- Location within Utah Location within the United States
- Location: 10317 South 1300 West; South Jordan, Utah; United States
- Coordinates: 40°33′50″N 111°55′34″W
- Area: 11.1 acres (4.5 ha)
- Built: 1907-09
- Architectural style: Late Victorian
- NRHP reference No.: 01000963
- Added to NRHP: September 7, 2001

The Samuel and Geneva Holt Farmstead, located at 10317 South 1300 West in South Jordan, Utah, United States, was built during 1907-09 and received later additions. It was listed on the National Register of Historic Places in 2001.

The farmstead, including outbuildings built in 1907 and since, was deemed significant in 2001 as one of only a "handful" of surviving historic farmsteads in South Jordan, and notably had been worked by the farm's residents and remained in the same family. The house was also important as exemplifying Victorian Eclectic architecture, whose application in a rural area helped in "denoting the end of Utah's isolation from the nation in the late nineteenth century."
