= Holt-Harrison House =

Historic house in North Carolina, United States

- U.S. National Register of Historic Places
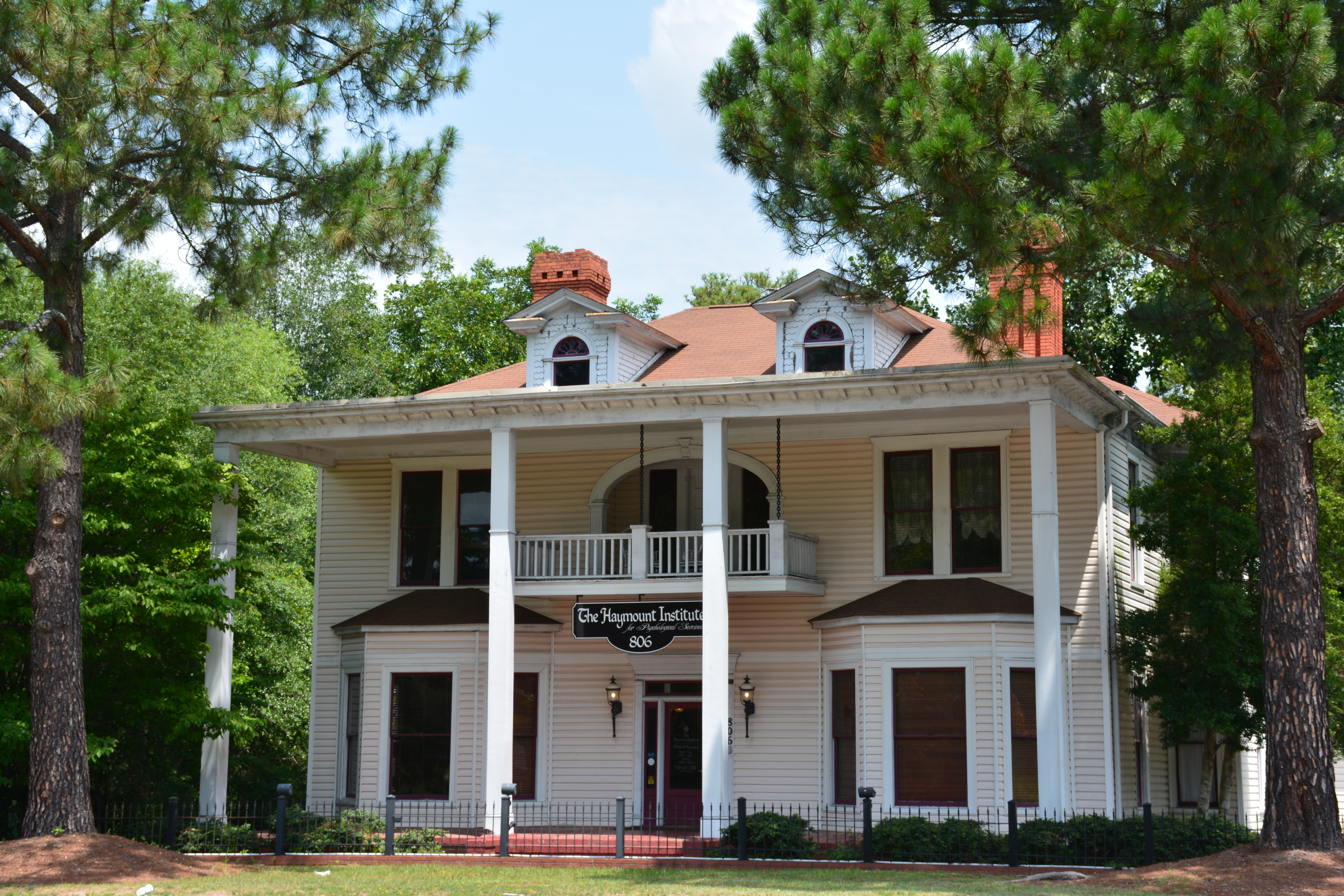

- Location within North Carolina Location within the United States
- Location: 806 Hay St., Fayetteville, North Carolina
- Coordinates: 35°3′22″N 78°53′33″W
- Area: less than one acre
- Built: c. 1897
- Architectural style: Colonial Revival
- MPS: Fayetteville MRA
- NRHP reference No.: 83001857
- Added to NRHP: July 7, 1983

Holt-Harrison House is a historic home located at Fayetteville, Cumberland County, North Carolina. It was built about 1897, and is a two-story, three-bay, hip roofed, Colonial Revival style frame dwelling. It has a double-pile central-hall plan, and a two-story portico that is a replacement.

It was listed on the National Register of Historic Places in 1983.
