= Noel Owen Neal House =

Historic house in Arkansas, United States

- Formerly listed on the U.S. National Register of Historic Places
- Location within Arkansas Location within the United States
- Nearest city: Nashville, Arkansas
- Coordinates: 33°56′41″N 93°57′20″W
- Built: 1840
- Architect: Neal, Noel Owen
- Architectural style: dogtrot
- NRHP reference No.: 03000959
- Removed from NRHP: January 26, 2006

Noel Owen Neal House, also known as Grace Fisher House, built in 1840, is a historic squared-log dogtrot house in Washington, Arkansas. Originally located at 184 Blue Bayou Road South in Nashville, Arkansas, it had been listed National Register of Historic Places. The Historic Preservation Alliance of Arkansas listed it as one of its Most Endangered Places in 2005.

The house was removed from the National Register on January 26, 2006. This followed its relocation to Washington and the replacement of its roof, porches, and chimneys during restoration.
