= John Seward House =

Historic house in Tennessee, United States

- U.S. National Register of Historic Places
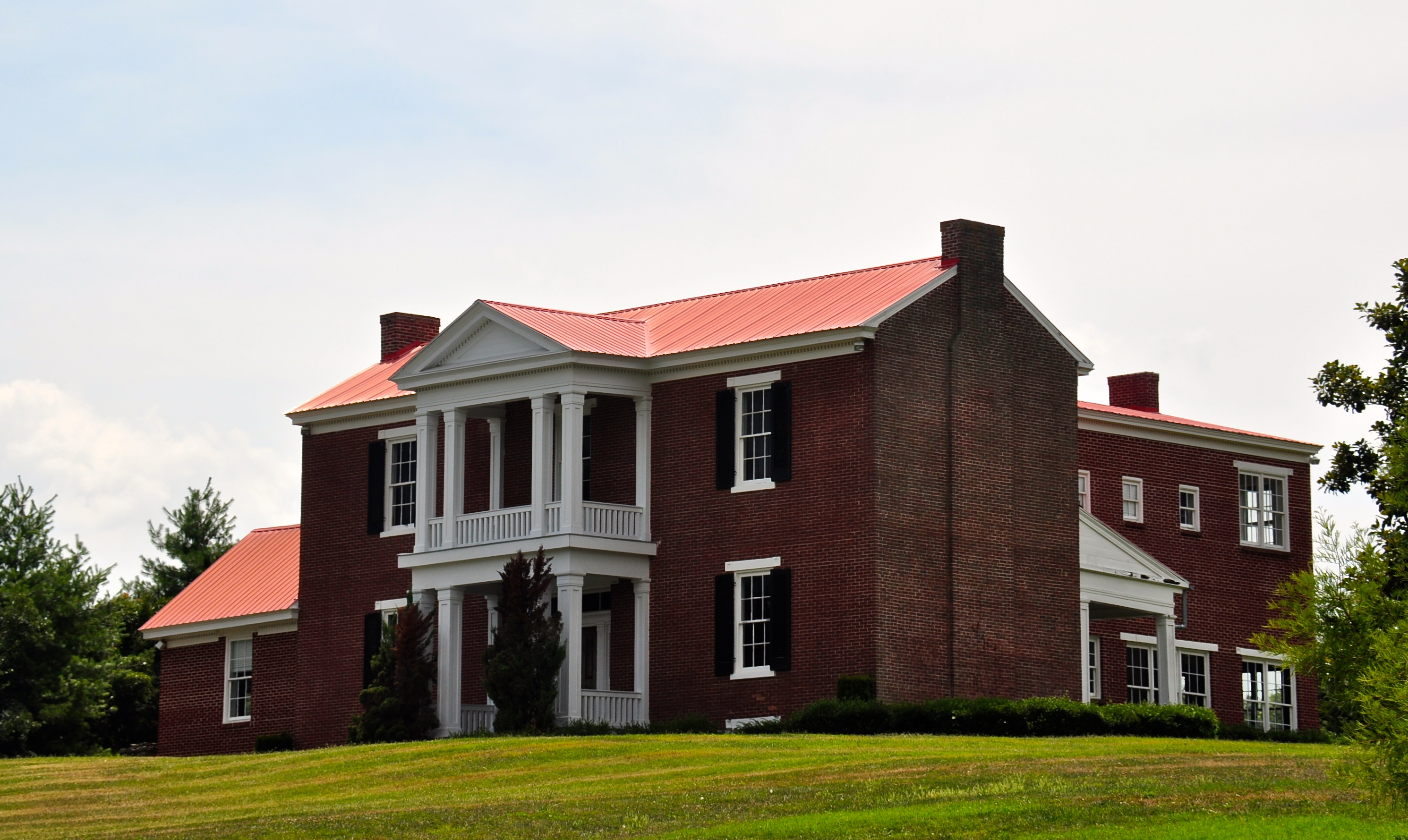
- John Seward House, July 2014.

- Location within Tennessee Location within the United States
- Location: Liberty Pike 3/4 mi. W of Wilson Pike, Franklin, Tennessee
- Coordinates: 35°55′41″N 86°46′57″W
- Area: 3.4 acres (1.4 ha)
- Built: c. 1847 and c. 1900
- Architectural style: Greek Revival, Central passage plan
- MPS: Williamson County MRA
- NRHP reference No.: 88000352
- Added to NRHP: April 13, 1988

The John Seward House in Franklin, Tennessee, United States, was listed on the National Register of Historic Places in 1988. It has also been known as Seward Hall. It includes Greek Revival and Central passage plan architecture. It's a brick residence. Like the Thomas Holt House and the James Sayers House, also NRHP-listed, it has a main entrance with Greek Revival details, including a two-story portico.
