= Benjamin Holt House =

Historic building in California, USA

- U.S. National Register of Historic Places
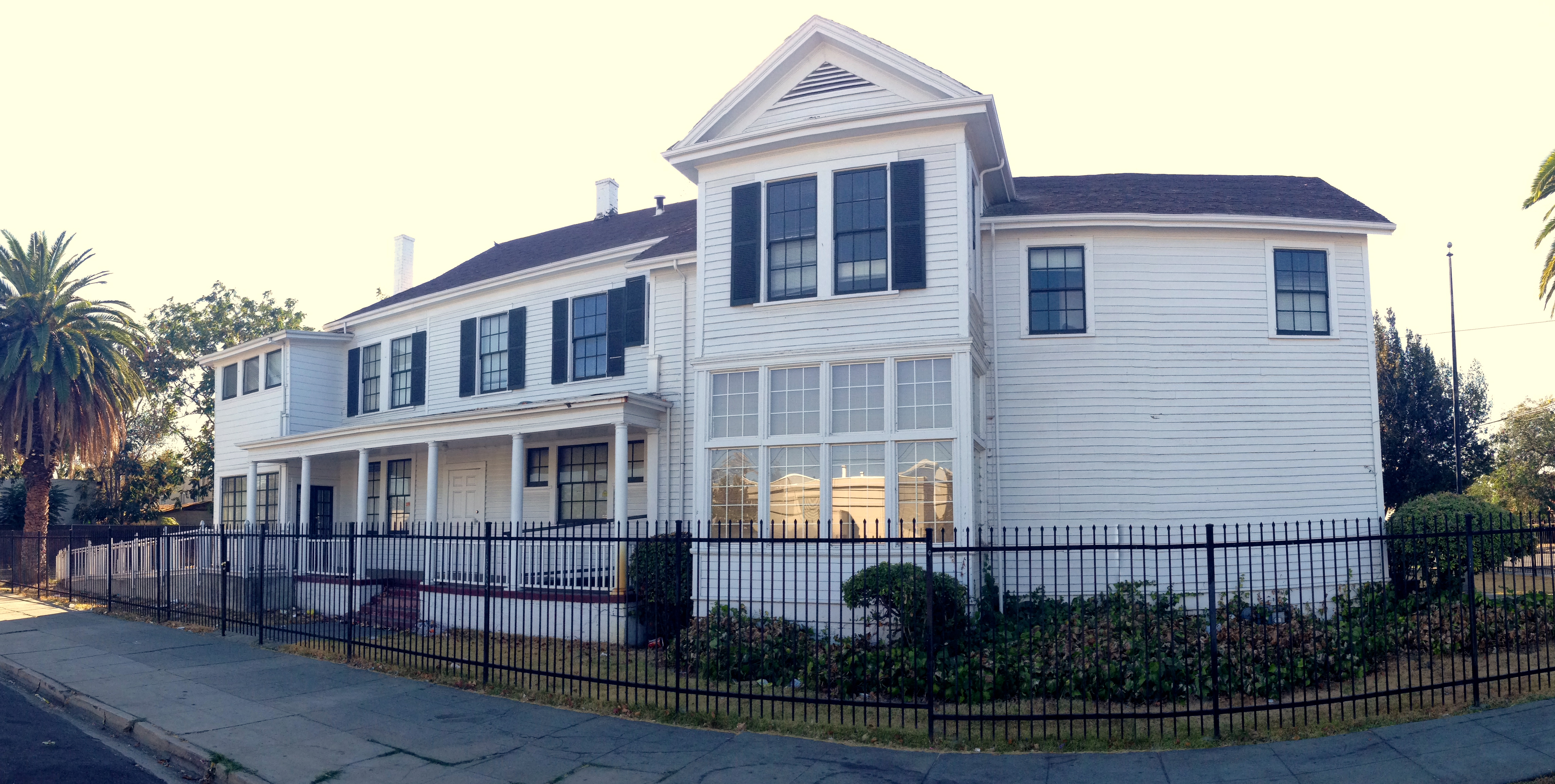
- Benjamin Holt House

- Location within Northern California
- Location: 548 E. Park St., Stockton, California
- Coordinates: 37°57′37″N 121°17′04″W
- Area: 0.6 acres (0.24 ha)
- Built: 1869
- Architectural style: Colonial Revival
- NRHP reference No.: 82002254
- Added to NRHP: March 2, 1982

The Benjamin Holt House is a private home in Stockton, California. Built in 1869, it was added to the National Register of Historic Places in 1982.

== History ==
The home was purchased by Benjamin Brown for his family. When Benjamin Holt, a business man whose family-held companies would eventually merge to form the Caterpillar Tractor Company, married Brown's daughter Anna, Holt moved into their family home. At the time that Brown purchased the house, it was adjacent to the El Dorado Brewing Company and diagonally across from the state mental hospital.

The house is a two-story, Colonial Revival, wood-frame structure, that has had numerous additions since it was first built. A garage was added in 1904 to house the family's new car. The living area is 5,542 square feet (514.9 m^{2}) on a half-acre lot.

Since 1980, part of the property has served as headquarters for the Forty-Niner Council, Boy Scouts of America.
