= Log Cabin Village =

19th century

- The Foster House at Log Cabin Village
- Established: 1966
- Location: 2100 Log Cabin Village Ln, Fort Worth, TX 76109
- Coordinates: 32°43′12.7″N 97°21′41.8″W
- Type: History museum
- Website: www.logcabinvillage.org

The Log Cabin Village is a 19th-century living history museum that provides a glimpse into Texas life in the 1800s. The site features staff members dressed in 19th-century-style attire and historic buildings from north and central Texas. Log Cabin Village is dedicated to the preservation of 19th c. folk architecture and frontier lifeways.

== History ==
The cabins in the village date to the mid-19th century. They were moved from various locations in Texas and restored at the village. The land for the village was donated to the city of Fort Worth, and the village opened to the public in 1966.

The site features a realistic blacksmith building, a schoolhouse, a gristmill etc. Historical interpreters in 19th century style clothing speak with visitors and demonstrate skills from the 1800s.

== Awards ==
2019 Texas Star Award - for contributions to preserving Texas history

== Bibliography ==
- Log Cabin Village: A History and Guide by Jordan-Bychkov, Terry G.
