= Lemon Wond Holt =

Hawaiian Stonewall Gang member

Lemon “Rusty” Wond Holt (22 September 1904 – 12 March 1999), was one of the last surviving local-born members of the “Stonewall Gang” who frequented Waikiki Beach during the early 1900s. He would gather surgeonfish, sea urchins, seaweed and young coconuts for Queen Liliuokalani when she came to visit his grandmother, Mary Ann Wond Lemon, her classmate at the Royal School. He also knew Prince Jonah Kuhio Kalanianaole, who sometimes took him tandem surfing on his koa longboard.

== Background ==
Holt still surfed into his mid-70s, riding the waves at Kuhio Beach, where he surfed as a child.

Holt raised pigs to earn his tuition at Kamehameha School for Boys when it was still located at the site of the current Bernice P. Bishop Museum. As a member of the Kamehameha football team, he helped set an all-time scoring record, defeating Honolulu Military Academy 104-0. He then went on to the University of Hawaii, where he played halfback on the championship football teams coached by Otto Klum in 1927–1929, earning an induction into the Hawaii Sports Hall of Fame in 1979. During the 1960s, he managed the Kamehameha Schools general stores.

He was predeceased by his wife, Gladys Ah Lin Tam Holt of Maui, and survived by his son, Lemon W. “Russ” Holt, Jr., and his daughter, Scioto Wonda Holt.
