= Elbert W. Holt House =

Historic house in Arkansas, United States

- U.S. National Register of Historic Places
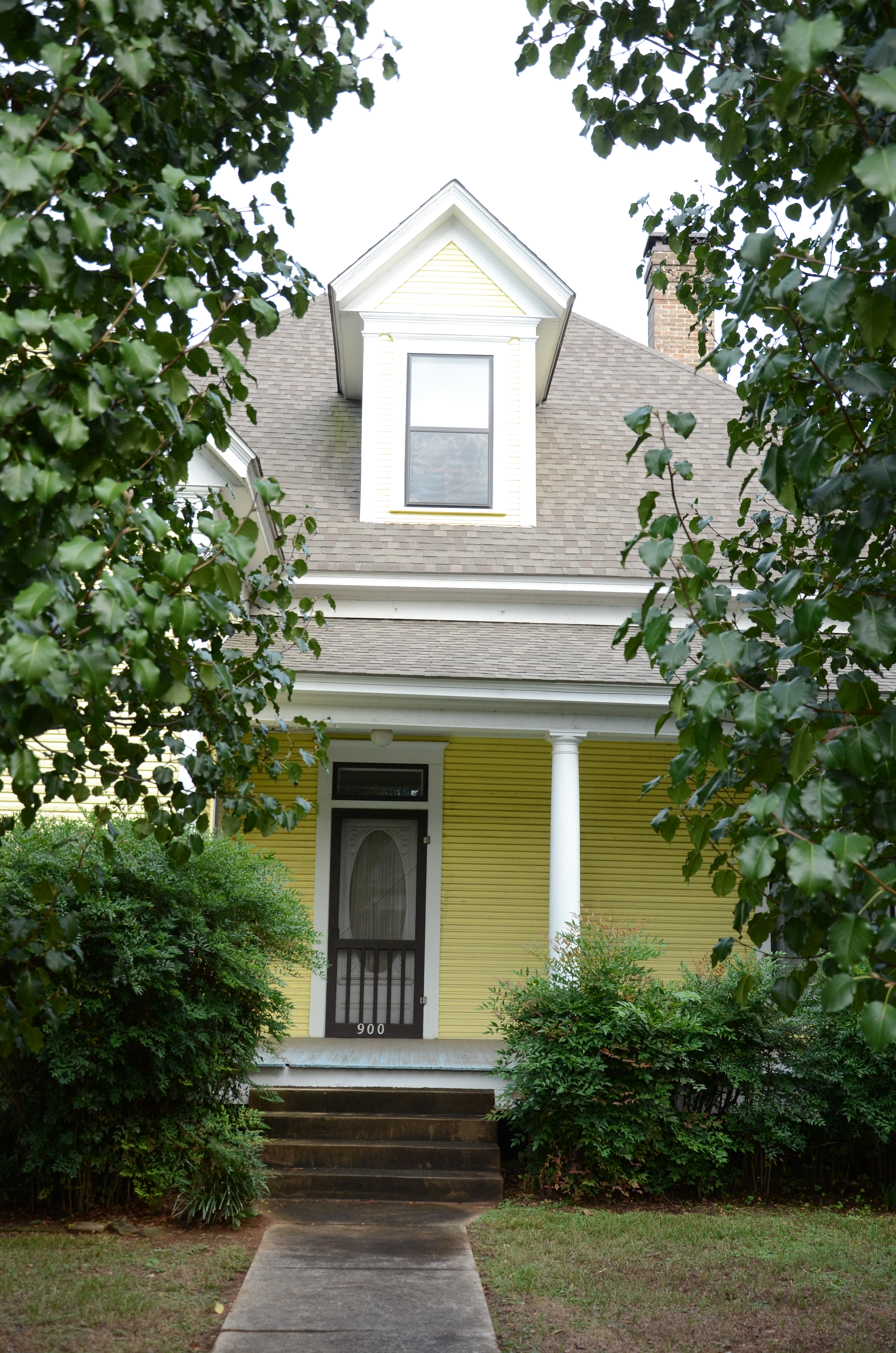

- Location within Arkansas Location within the United States
- Location: 902 N. Main St., Nashville, Arkansas
- Coordinates: 33°57′35″N 93°51′11″W
- Area: 1.7 acres (0.69 ha)
- Built: 1910
- Built by: Elbert W. Holt
- Architectural style: Colonial Revival
- NRHP reference No.: 84000901
- Added to NRHP: September 20, 1984

The Elbert W. Holt House is a historic house at 902 North Main Street in Nashville, Arkansas, U.S. It is a 1½ story wood-frame structure, roughly rectangular in shape, with a hip roof and five projecting gable sections. Although it is predominantly Colonial Revival in its styling, its massing and busy exterior are reminiscent of the Queen Anne period. The house was built in 1910 by Elbert Holt, a local builder of some reputation (probably best known for building the Howard County Courthouse), to be his own home. Both the exterior and interior have received only modest alteration since the house's construction.

The house was listed on the National Register of Historic Places in 1984.

== See also ==
- Flavius Holt House, the home of Holt's uncle, located nearby on Kohler Street
- National Register of Historic Places listings in Howard County, Arkansas
