= Flavius Holt House =

Historic house in Arkansas, United States

- U.S. National Register of Historic Places
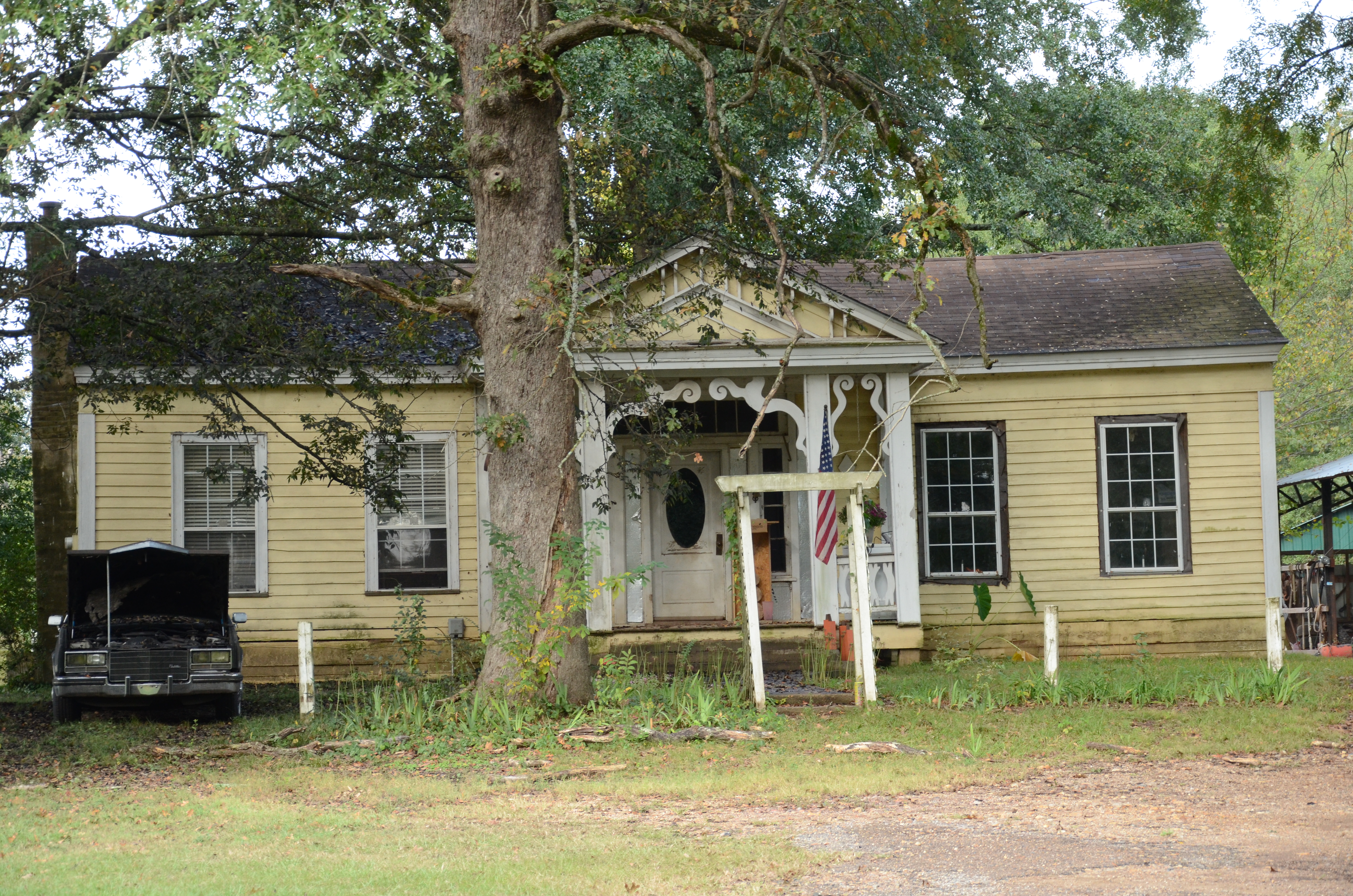

- Location within Arkansas Location within the United States
- Location: Kohler St., Nashville, Arkansas
- Coordinates: 33°57′5″N 93°50′39″W
- Area: less than one acre
- Built: 1877
- Architectural style: Victorian
- NRHP reference No.: 78000593
- Added to NRHP: December 1, 1978

The Flavius Holt House is a historic house on Kohler Street in Nashville, Arkansas. It is a single story wood-frame structure, with a gable roof and a single chimney at the western end. A shed roof addition extends to the rear of the house. The main entrance is sheltered by an ornately decorated gable-front portico, supported by paired box columns in front, and pilasters at the rear. Within the gable are paired brackets and a secondary pediment. There are free-form scrolled brackets adorning the front columns. The house is known to have been standing when Flavius Holt, a local innkeeper, purchased the property in 1877, and the property is known to be the site of one of the first homes (a log cabin) erected in Nashville in 1836. Holt operated the property as a tavern and stagecoach rest stop until the arrival of the railroad in 1884 caused a decline in business. This house is one of the few pre-railroad buildings to survive in Nashville.

The house was listed on the National Register of Historic Places in 1978.

== See also ==
- Elbert W. Holt House, built by Holt's nephew on North Main Street
- National Register of Historic Places listings in Howard County, Arkansas
