= Thomas Holt House =

Historic house in Tennessee, United States

- U.S. National Register of Historic Places
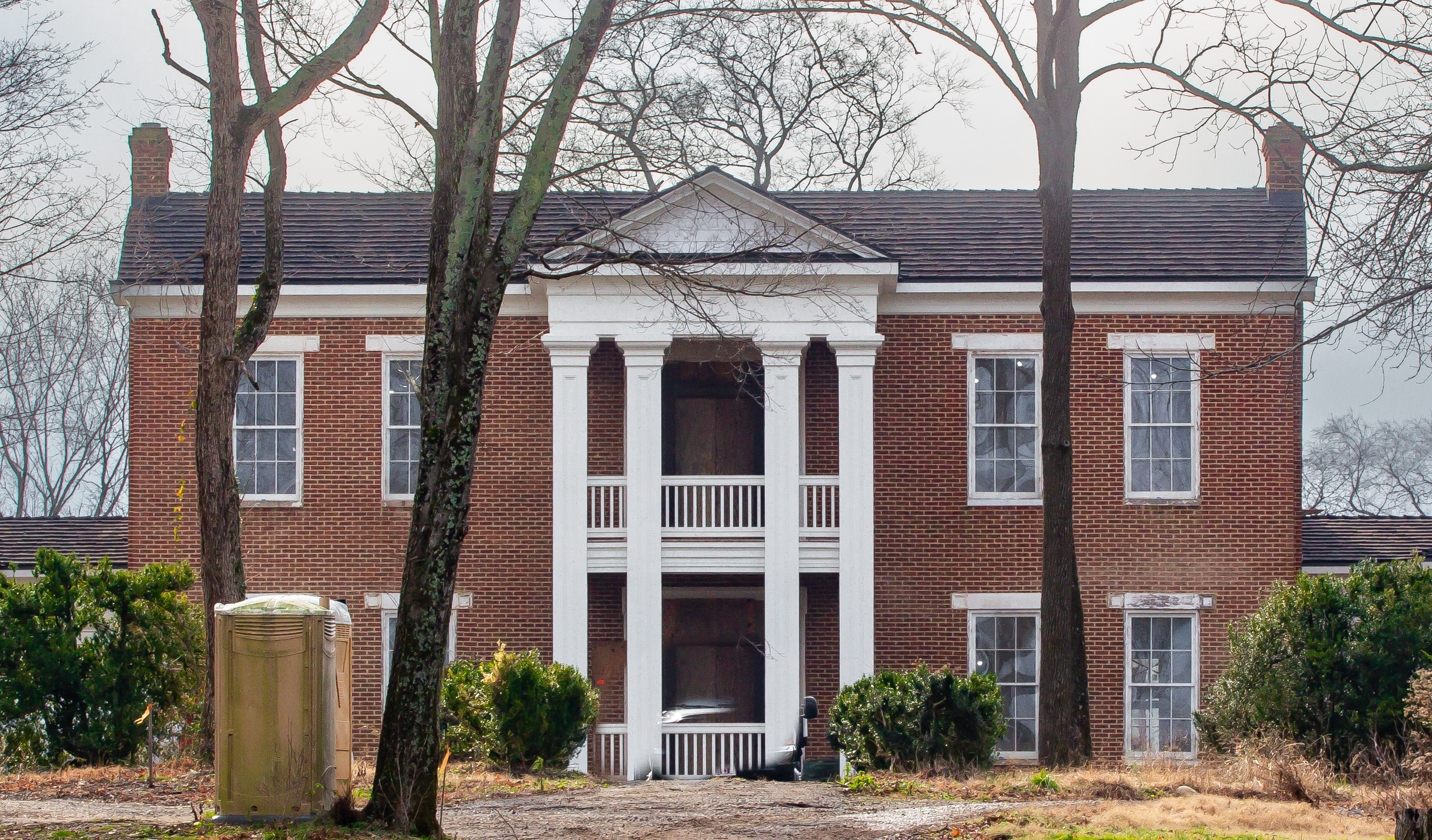

- Location within Tennessee Location within the United States
- Location: 9303 Crockett Rd. Brentwood, Tennessee
- Coordinates: 35°58′30″N 86°45′50″W
- Area: 6.4 acres (2.6 ha)
- Built: c.1840, c.1880 and c.1900
- Architectural style: Greek Revival, Central hall plan
- MPS: Williamson County MRA
- NRHP reference No.: 88000274
- Added to NRHP: April 14, 1988

The Thomas Holt House is a property in Brentwood, Tennessee, which dates from c.1840 and that was listed on the National Register of Historic Places in 1988. It has also been known as Holtland.

It includes Greek Revival, Central hall plan and other architecture.

When listed the property included one contributing building and one contributing structure on an area of 6.4 acres (2.6 ha).

The NRHP eligibility of the property was covered in a 1988 study of Williamson County historical resources.

Like the John Seward House and the James Sayers House, also NRHP-listed, it has a main entrance with Greek Revival details, including a two-story portico.

== History ==
In 1840, the house was built by Thomas Holt and his wife Rosanna. Thomas had acquired the house via his grandfather Christopher Holt, who had been granted the land by the US government as a thanks for his service in American Revolutionary War. The house and its surrounding fields was a notable plantation, and in 1859, was 682 acres, and had 14 slaves working there. It stopped being a plantation after 1865, as slavery was abolished. After this though, the plantation still served as a farm, with many of the former slaves staying there, now being paid for their labour. The Holt family were friendly to the labourers working there, building a church, school and homes for the employees and their families. For over 100 years after the property had ceased to be a plantation, it served as a farm, until in the 1980s, parts of the property started to become residential developments. In 2016, the final part of the estate also made into homes
