= Abram Glenn House =

Historic house in Tennessee, United States

- U.S. National Register of Historic Places
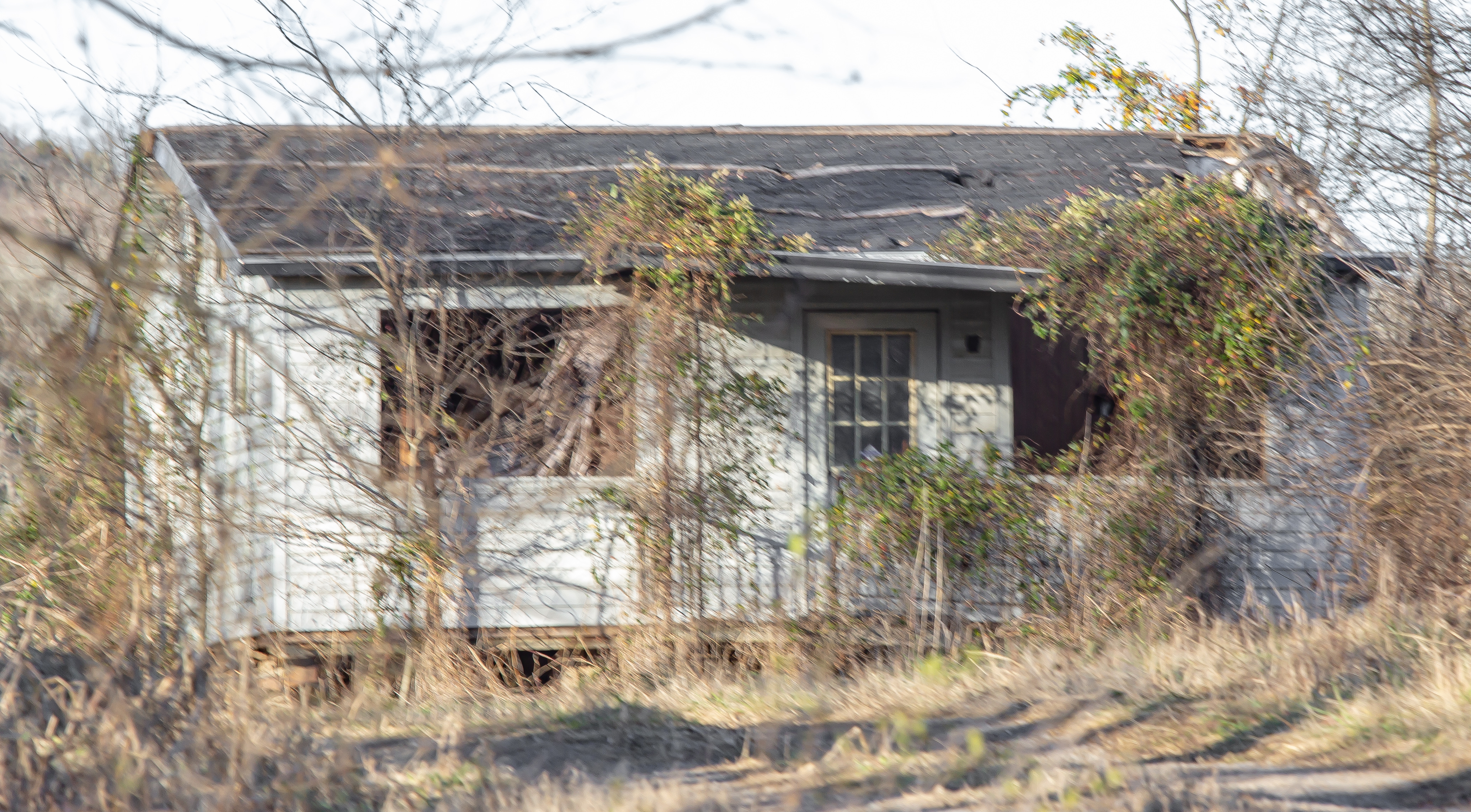
- Abram Glenn House

- Location within Tennessee Location within the United States
- Location: McCanless Rd. 1 1/2 mi. E of US Alt. 41, Triune, Tennessee
- Coordinates: 35.883333°N 86.633889°W
- Area: 11.2 acres (4.5 ha)
- Built: c. 1815, c. 1825 and c. 1880
- Architectural style: Single pen
- MPS: Williamson County MRA
- NRHP reference No.: 88000310
- Added to NRHP: April 13, 1988

The Abram Glenn House is a property in Triune, Tennessee that was listed on the National Register of Historic Places in 1988. It dates from c.1815.

The NRHP-eligibility of the property was covered in a 1988 study of Williamson County historical resources.

The log house consists of two single pen log structures joined by a frame breezeway. One of the pens is two-stories tall and was built c.1815; the second pen, a kitchen with half dovetail notching, was added c.1825. What was an open breezeway was enclosed c.1880, at the same time as the log pens were covered with weatherboard.
