= Dinehart-Holt House =

Historic house museum in Slayton, Minnesota, United States

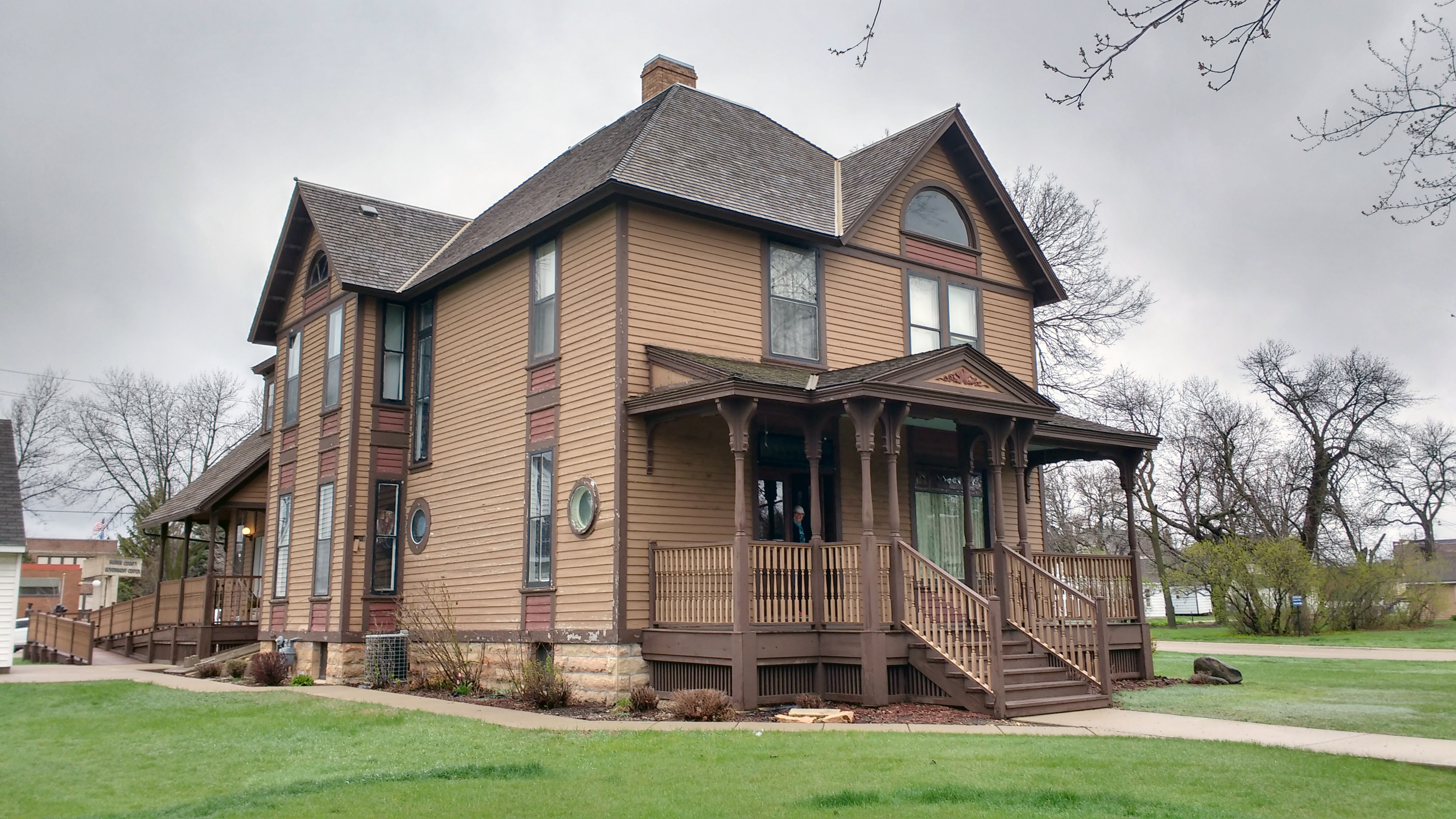
- Dinehart-Holt House
- Established: 2007
- Location: 2812 Linden Ave, Slayton, Minnesota 56172
- Type: Local History
- Website: Dinehart-Holt House

- Dinehart-Holt House
- U.S. National Register of Historic Places
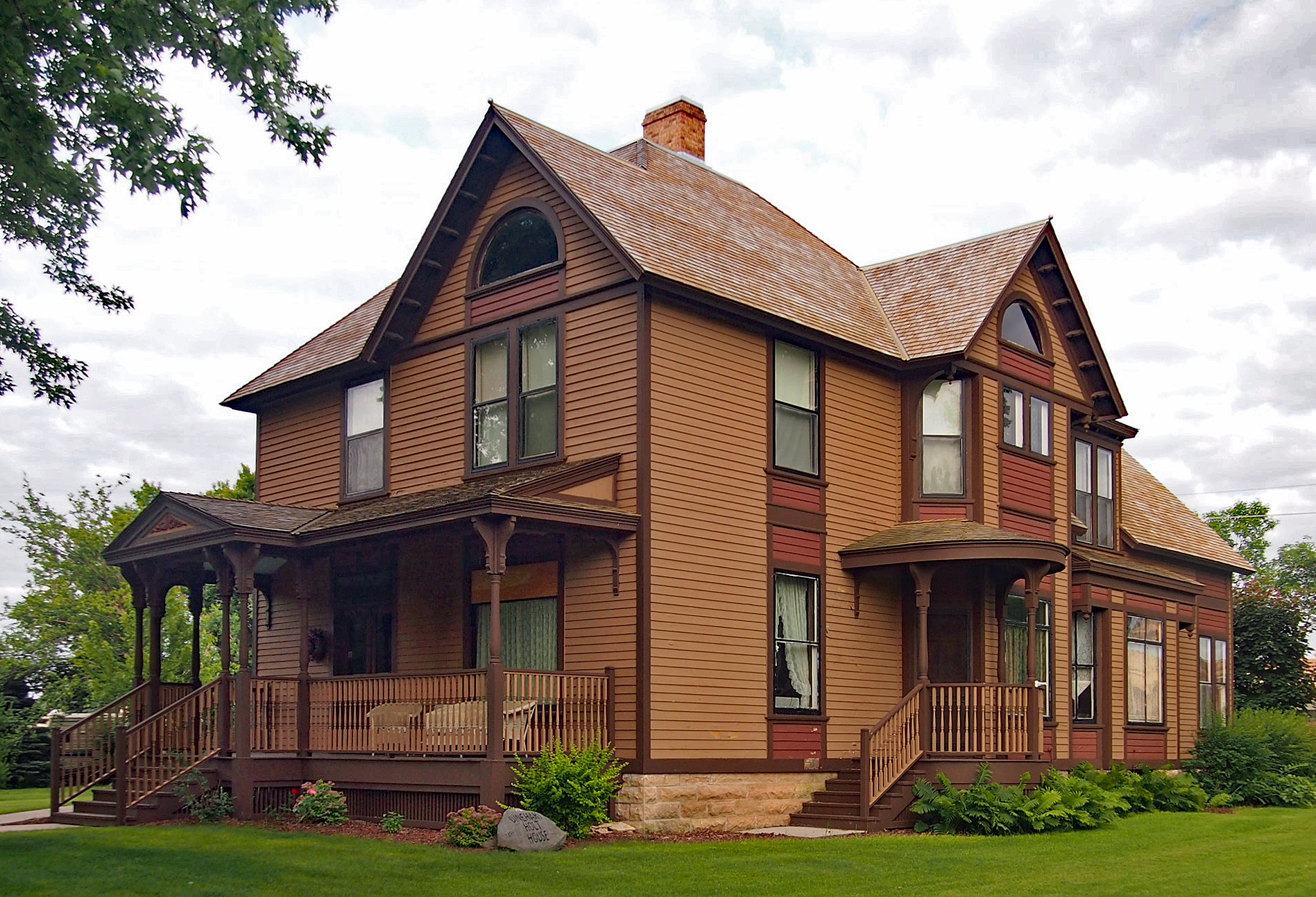
- Dinehart-Holt House

- Location within Minnesota Location within the United States
- Location: 2812 Linden Ave, Slayton, Minnesota 56172
- Coordinates: 43.596°N 95.4519°W
- Area: 17 acres (6.9 ha)
- Built: 1891
- NRHP reference No.: 82000562
- Added to NRHP: December 7, 1982

The Dinehart-Holt House is a historic house museum located in Slayton, Minnesota. Built in 1891, the museum offers a glimpse into the lives of prominent residents C.E. Dinehart and his family, as well as the early days of Slayton and Murray County.

== History ==
C.E. Dinehart, a founding member of the State Bank of Slayton and prominent landowner, commissioned the house in 1891. Architect Frank Thayer, who also designed the Murray County Courthouse, was hired to bring Dinehart's vision to life. The Dineharts raised livestock and were known for their community gatherings featuring Flora Dinehart's piano, the first in the county.

The house eventually passed to the Holt family through Florence Dinehart's marriage to Harvy Holt. Judge John Holt, one of their sons, resided in the house until his passing in 1993. Following his death, the house and its furnishings were sold. Murray County purchased the property in 2007 with the intention of preserving it as a museum.

== Significance ==
Listed on the National Register of Historic Places since 1982, the Dinehart-Holt House is a well-preserved example of Victorian architecture in Murray County. The museum's collection reflects the lifestyle of a prosperous family in the late 19th and early 20th centuries. Visitors can explore the house and learn about the Dineharts and Holts, gaining a deeper understanding of Slayton's and Murray County's social and economic development.

== Exhibits and Events ==
The Dinehart-Holt House Museum offers tours that showcase the period furnishings and architectural details. The museum also highlights the stories of the Dinehart and Holt families, their contributions to the community, and the broader history of Murray County. In addition to tours, the house can be rented for special occasions.

== Murray County Historical Society ==
The day-to-day operations of the Dinehart-Holt House Museum fall under the purview of the non-profit organization, Murray County Historical Society. The property was acquired in 2007 by the government of Murray County with the specific purpose of preserving it as a museum. This acquisition ensured the house's long-term protection and its continued role as a public educational resource.

The Murray County Historical Society, a non-profit organization founded in 1934, is dedicated to preserving and sharing the history of the county. In addition to the recently acquired Dinehart/Holt House built in 1891, their facilities include, the Murray County Historical Museum, the Sierk Building showcasing the agricultural heritage, and the Wornson Log Cabin from 1872.

In addition to operating several museums, the organization maintains an archive of documents pertaining to history of Murray County, including the original blueprints for the Great Oasis drainage project of 1913 and the original blueprints for the Dinehart Holt House.

== See also ==
- List of museums in Minnesota
