= Dumas High School =

Location
- 709 Dan Gill Drive; Dumas, Arkansas; United States; 33°52′37″N 91°28′13″W

Information
- Type: Public secondary
- School district: Dumas Public Schools
- NCES District ID: 0505500
- CEEB code: 040660
- NCES School ID: 050550000262
- Principal: Lorrie Holt
- Teaching staff: 37.28 (on FTE basis)
- Grades: 10–12
- Enrollment: 305 (2023-2024)
- Student to teacher ratio: 8.18
- Campus type: Rural
- Colors: Purple and Old gold
- Athletics conference: 4A Region 8 (2012–14)
- Sports: Baseball, Basketball, Competitive Cheer, Football, Golf, Soccer, Softball, Athletics, BAND
- Mascot: Bobcat
- Team name: Dumas Bobcats
- Yearbook: Bobcat
- Affiliations: Arkansas Activities Association
- Website: www.dpsd.k12.ar.us/o/dhs

Dumas High School (DHS), formerly Dumas New Tech High School, is a comprehensive public secondary school located in Dumas, Arkansas, United States, for students in grades ten through twelve. Dumas is one of two public high schools in Desha County and is the sole high school administered by the Dumas Public Schools.

It serves territory in Desha and Lincoln counties, including Dumas, Gould, Mitchellville, and Winchester. It also serves Arkansas Department of Corrections prison property (Cummins Unit).

== History ==
The Dumas district scheduled a consolidation of Gould High School into Dumas High effective fall 2005. The Gould School District had merged into the Dumas district the previous year.

== Attendance area ==
Within Desha County, the school district (and therefore the high school's attendance boundary) includes Dumas and Mitchellville.

Within Lincoln County, it includes Gould. It also serves Arkansas Department of Corrections prison property (Cummins Unit).

The district extends into Drew County, where it serves Winchester.

== Academics ==
The assumed course of study for students is to complete the Smart Core curriculum developed by the Arkansas Department of Education (ADE), which requires students complete at least 24 units for graduation. Course offerings include regular and Advanced Placement classes and exams with opportunities for college credit via AP exam. The school is accredited by the ADE and has been accredited by AdvancED since 1957.

=== Fine Arts ===
Students may participate in various musical and performing arts such as band or choir. The Fine Arts program has been expanded as of the 2018–2019 school year, now offering classes dedicated to theatre and jazz band.

== Athletics ==
The Dumas High School mascot is the Bobcat with the school colors of purple and gold.

For the 2012–14 seasons, the Dumas Bobcats participate in the 4A Region 8 Conference. Competition is primarily sanctioned by the Arkansas Activities Association with student-athletes competing in Quiz Bowl, football, baseball, basketball (boys/girls), golf (boys/girls), softball, tennis (boys/girls), track and field (boys/girls).

== Alumni ==
- Sheilla Lampkin, Member of Arkansas House of Representatives from 2011 to 2016
