= Delta Heritage Trail State Park =

State park in Arkansas, United States

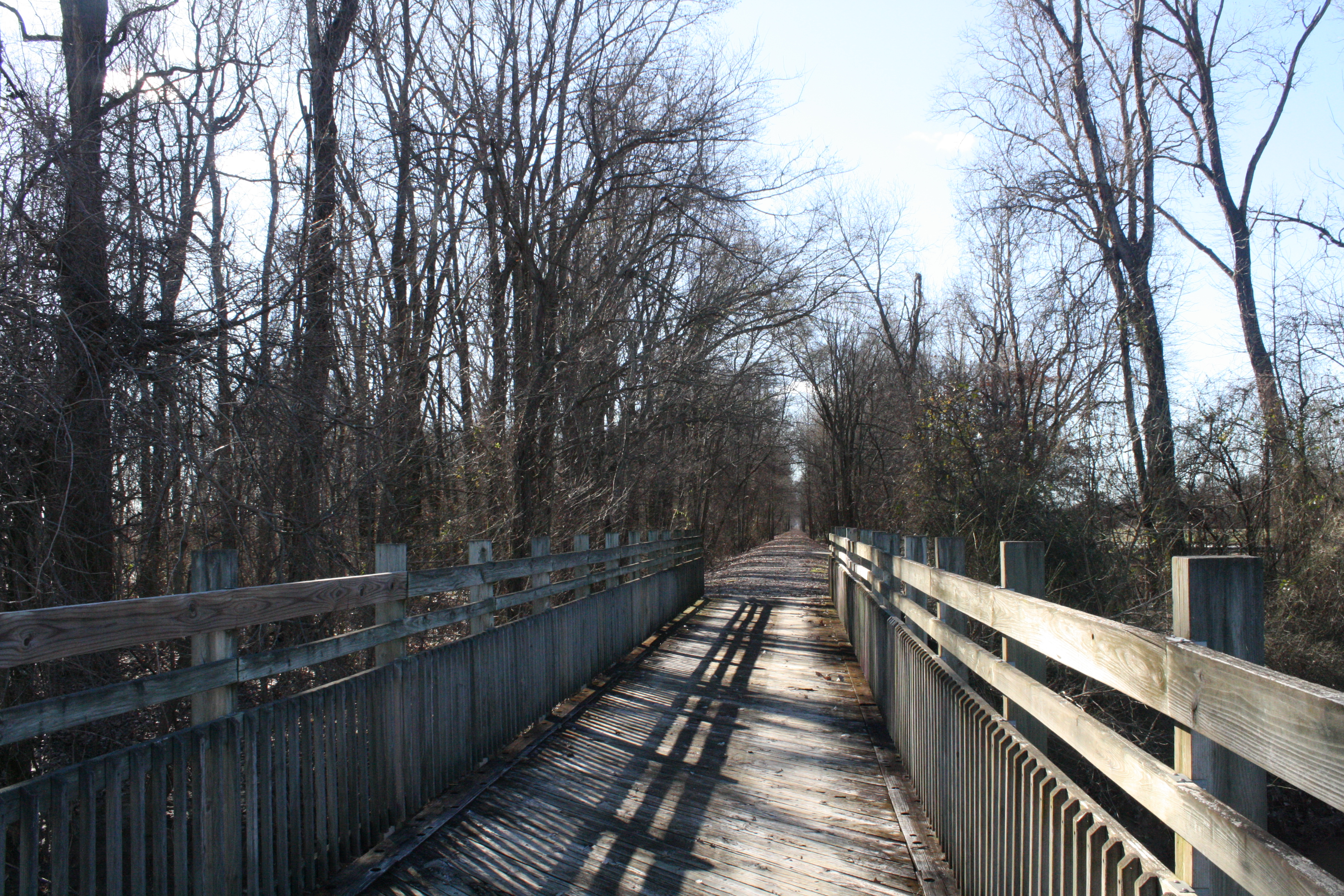
- Bridge over Lick Creek

- Location within Arkansas Location within the United States
- Interactive map of Delta Heritage Trail State Park
- Location: Arkansas, Desha, and Phillips counties, Arkansas United States
- Coordinates: 34°33′15″N 90°45′31″W
- Area: 960 acres (390 ha)
- Established: October 25, 2002
- Administrator: Arkansas Department of Parks, Heritage and Tourism
- Website: Official website
- Arkansas State Parks

Delta Heritage Trail State Park is a 960-acre (390 ha) Arkansas state park in Arkansas, Desha, and Phillips counties, Arkansas in the United States. A rails to trails conversion planned along 84.46 miles (135.93 km) of abandoned Union Pacific right of way, the Delta Heritage Trail currently runs 40 miles (64 km) from Lexa to Snow Lake, with a southern section of 28 miles (45 km) between Arkansas City and the White River at Yancopin. Work on the 36.4 miles (58.6 km) middle section was funded by a RAISE grant in 2021, to be completed by 2025.

There are trailheads at Lexa, Barton, Lick Creek, Lake View, Elaine, Watson, Rohwer, and Arkansas City.

== History ==
Acquisition of the abandoned corridor was aided by the National Trails System Act, and the beginnings of the trail through Delta lowlands was dedicated in 2002.

== See also ==
- Yancopin Bridge
