= Arkansas City =

Arkansas City may refer to:

- Arkansas City, Arkansas, a town in Desha County, Arkansas, United States, and pronounced "Ar-kən-saw City"
- Arkansas City, Kansas, a city in Cowley County, Kansas, United States, and pronounced "Ar-Kansas City"
- Arkansas City, Texas, a ghost town in Starr County, Texas, United States, with an undisclosed pronunciation
