= Arkansas City High School (Arkansas) =

- U.S. National Register of Historic Places
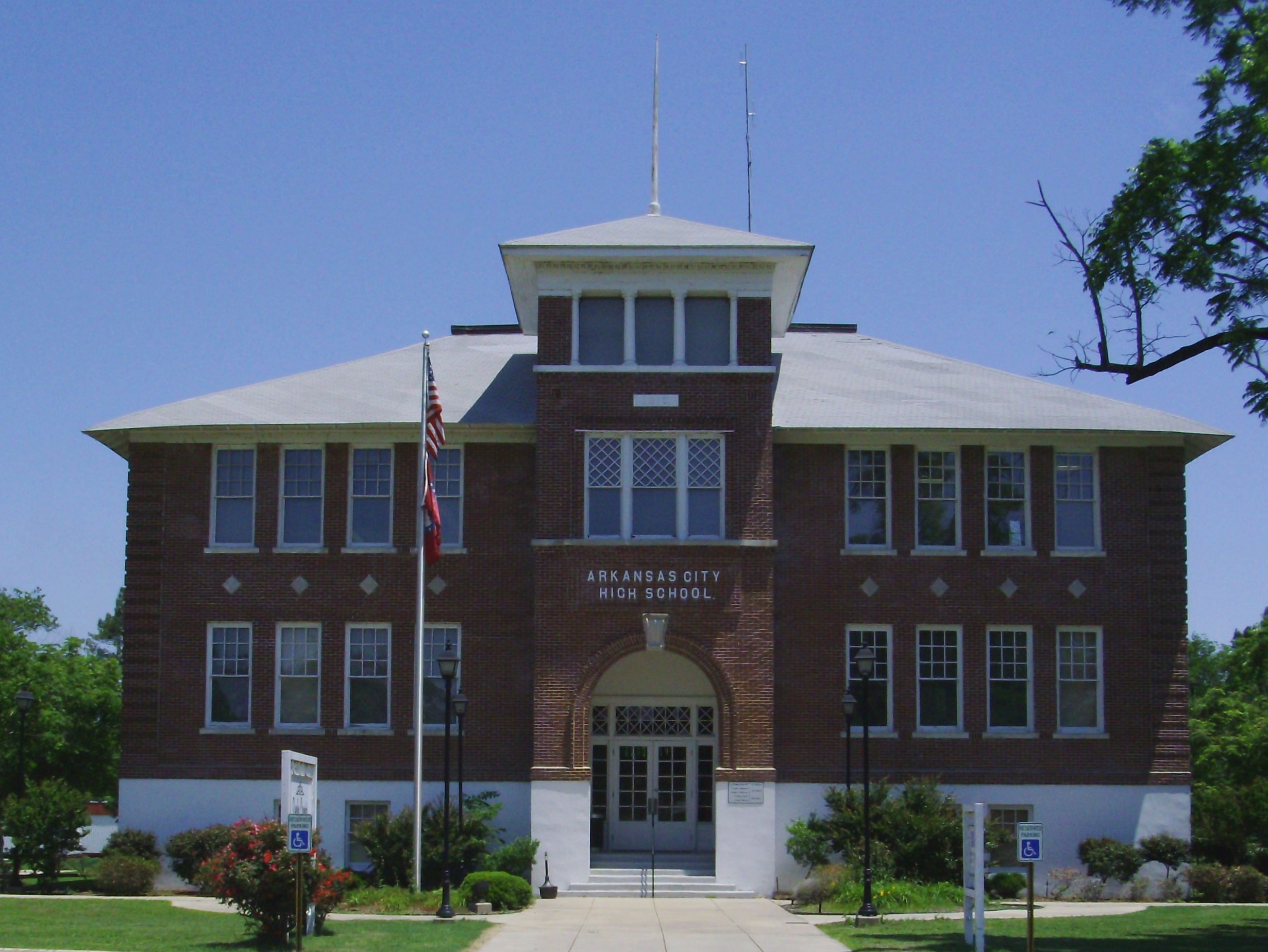

- Location within Arkansas Location within the United States
- Location: Robert S. Moore Ave. and President St., Arkansas City, Arkansas
- Coordinates: 33°36′36″N 91°12′05″W
- Area: less than one acre
- Built: 1910
- Architect: Ferrell, Clyde A.
- Architectural style: Colonial Revival and Renaissance Revival
- NRHP reference No.: 84000005
- Added to NRHP: October 4, 1984

Arkansas City High School
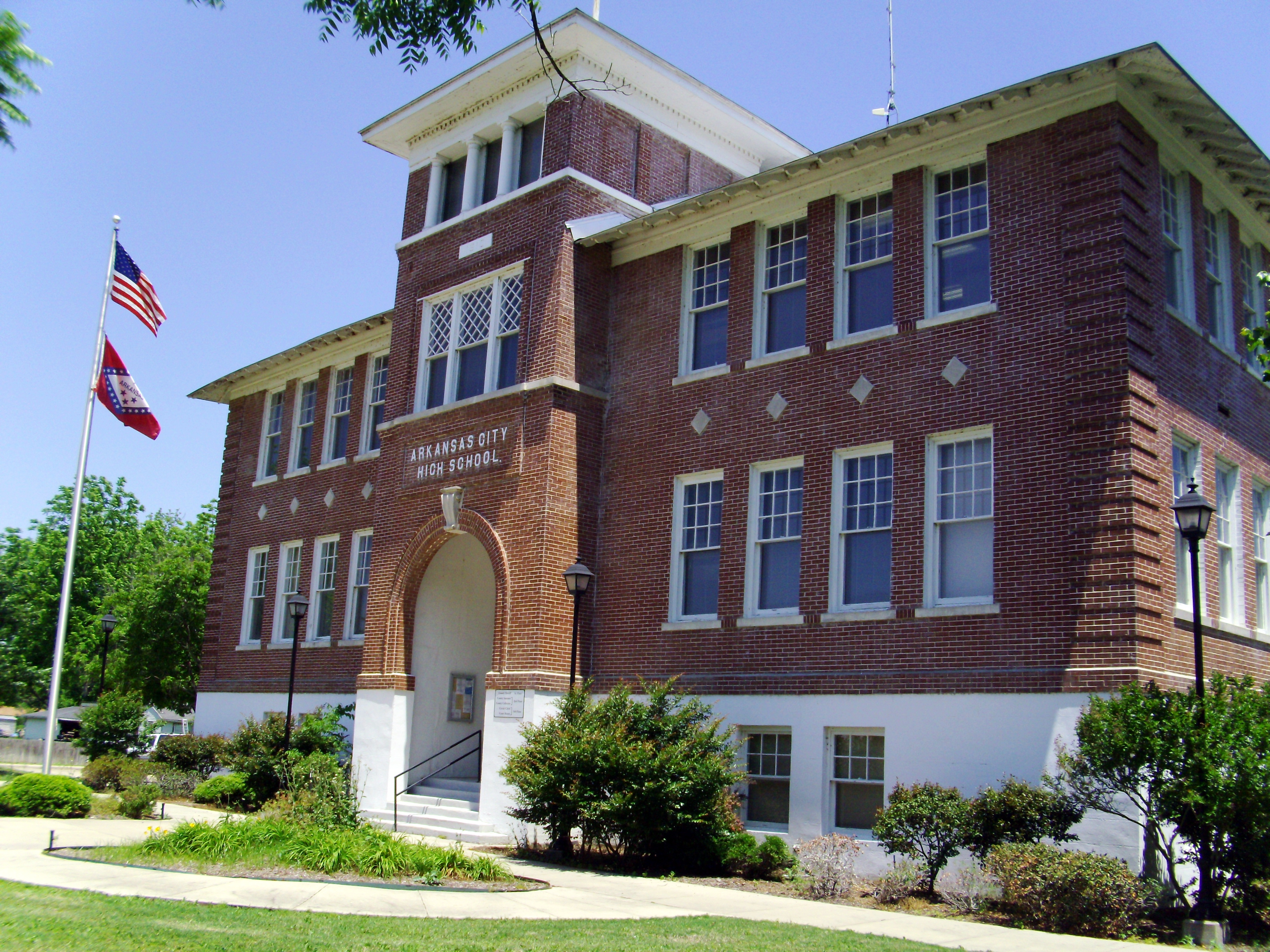
- Arkansas City High School (pre-1983)
- Arkansas City, Desha County, Arkansas; United States

Information
- Established: 1910
- Status: Closed
- Closed: c. 1983 (building reopened 2005 for non-school use)
- School district: Arkansas City School District
- Mascot: River Rat
- Team name: Arkansas City River Rats
- High School: 1910-1983
- Not in Use: 1984-2005
- Courthouse Annex: 2005-

The Arkansas City High School was a comprehensive public high school serving students between 1910 and 2004 in Arkansas City, Arkansas, United States. Since 2005, the original 1910 building, which is listed on the National Register of Historic Places, has served as an annex of the neighboring Desha County Courthouse. It was a part of the Arkansas City School District.

== History ==
=== Arkansas City High School (1910-1983) ===
Located in Desha County in southeastern Arkansas, Arkansas City High School was built in 1910 and listed on the National Register of Historic Places in 1984. It was designed by Arkansas architect Clyde A. Ferrell in Colonial Revival and Renaissance Revival style architecture. This building served as the high school until 1983, when the high school relocated to a newer building near Arkansas Highway 4, at Iulagi Street and Sadie Lee Avenue.

=== Courthouse Annex (2005-) ===
For approximately 20 years from its closure in 1983, the former high school fell into disrepair. By 2003, a $2.2 million two-year renovation of the building began. The revived structure reopened in 2005 as an annex of the Desha County Courthouse. While the courthouse underwent its own renovations in the early 2000s, the former high school also housed the county courts.

=== Public education in Arkansas City ===
The Arkansas City School District served Arkansas City, with students at Arkansas City High School and Arkansas City Elementary School, until consolidation with the McGehee School District on July 1, 2004. Arkansas City High School's mascot was the River Rat, so named due to the town's close proximity to the Mississippi River.

The district consolidation was the result of the Arkansas General Assembly enacting a law requiring school districts with fewer than 350 students apiece to consolidate with other districts. Following the consolidation, the McGehee district continued to operate the newer Arkansas City campus as a K-6 elementary school through its closure in October 2005. The 1983 campus has since housed a branch of the Southeast Arkansas Regional Library System.

== See also ==
- National Register of Historic Places listings in Desha County, Arkansas
