= County government in Arkansas =

Subdivisions of Arkansas

Counties of Arkansas
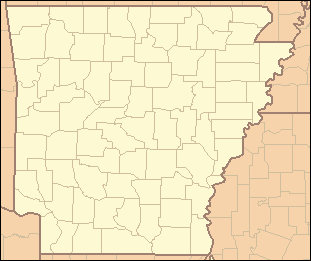
- Location: State of Arkansas
- Number: 75
- Populations: 5,368 (Calhoun) – 382,748 (Pulaski)
- Areas: 526 square miles (1,360 km^{2}) (Lafayette) – 1,039 square miles (2,690 km^{2}) (Union)
- Government: County government
- Subdivisions: cities, towns, townships, unincorporated communities, census designated place

County government in Arkansas is a political subdivision of the state established for a more convenient administration of justice and for purposes of providing services for the state by the Constitution of Arkansas and the Arkansas General Assembly through the Arkansas Code. In Arkansas, counties have no inherent authority, only power given to them by the state government. This means the county executive, the county judge, and legislative body, the quorum court (members of the quorum court hold the title justice of the peace, usually abbreviated JP), have limited power compared to other states.

== Officials ==
All seventy-five counties have the following elected officials

- County judge: Non-judicial leader responsible for implementation of quorum court decisions, while retaining some control over strategy and direction (similar to a chief executive officer) and staff and operational decisions (similar to a chief operating officer), except those held by other elected officials. Sometimes called a county executive in other jurisdictions.
- County sheriff: Chief law enforcement officer, polices areas without local police, runs the county jail, acts as officer of the local courts (transporting prisoners, serving subpoenas, acting as bailiff, etc.)
- County assessor: Values real property and personal property for taxation and maintains parcel records.
- Circuit clerk: Collects, files, records, and processes legal court documents and reports to the Administrative Office of the Courts, part of the Arkansas Judiciary. Also responsible for court notices, warrants, subpoenas and maintaining a list of potential jurors. In Arkansas, the circuit clerk is also the county recorder, keeping an official county record of contracts, mortgages, plats, surety bonds, and deeds.
- County collector: Collects tax revenues.
- County coroner: Determines cause and manner of deaths in the jurisdiction.
- County clerk: Maintains voter registration, issues marriage licenses and DBA certificates. In some smaller counties, the county clerk position is combined with the circuit clerk.
- County treasurer: Maintains county accounting records and issues annual financial reports, disburses tax revenues to municipalities and other jurisdictions, invests county money.
- County surveyor: A registered land surveyor who surveys at the request of the county assessor or quorum court, as well as assisting the public with property surveys or legal descriptions. Some counties have left this position vacant for years.
- Constable: Law enforcement officer historically elected to serve in rural areas. Certified constables have authority to conduct traffic stops, make arrests and keep the peace

Except Constables, all officials are elected to four-year terms in November of even-numbered, non-presidential election years after being nominated in partisan primary elections. Constables are elected to two-year terms in November of even-numbered years.

=== Requirements to serve ===
Any citizen of Arkansas and the United States who is 18 years of age or older and lives in the county may run for the county positions except county judge, who must be 25 years old and an Arkansas resident for at least the prior two years. Candidates must be qualified electors in the county, and not have been convicted of an "infamous crime". The only professional credential requirements are for the county surveyor, who must be a licensed land surveyor.

Arkansas has 75 counties, including 10 with dual county seats: Arkansas, Carroll, Clay, Craighead, Franklin, Logan, Mississippi, Prairie, Sebastian, Yell. These dual county seats were established to allow for court business to proceed when travel across the county was difficult. Though they have two courthouses, the constitutional officers are not duplicated.

== Quorum Court ==
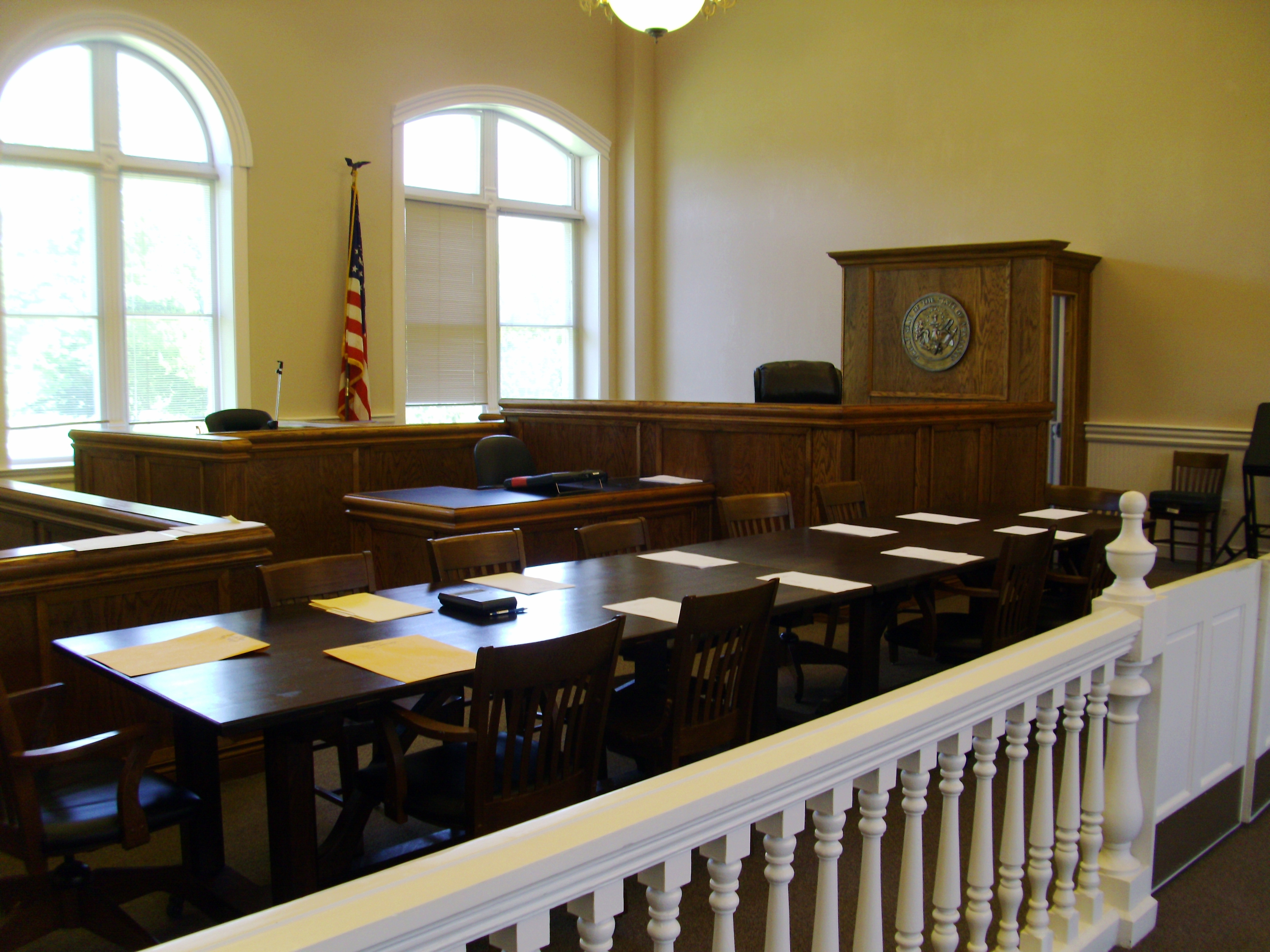
Quorum court chambers of the Desha County Courthouse in Arkansas City, Arkansas

The quorum court is the legislative branch of the county government and controls all spending and revenue collection. Representatives are called justices of the peace and are elected from county districts every even-numbered year. The number of districts in a county vary from nine to fifteen, and district boundaries are drawn by the county election commission.

== County judge ==
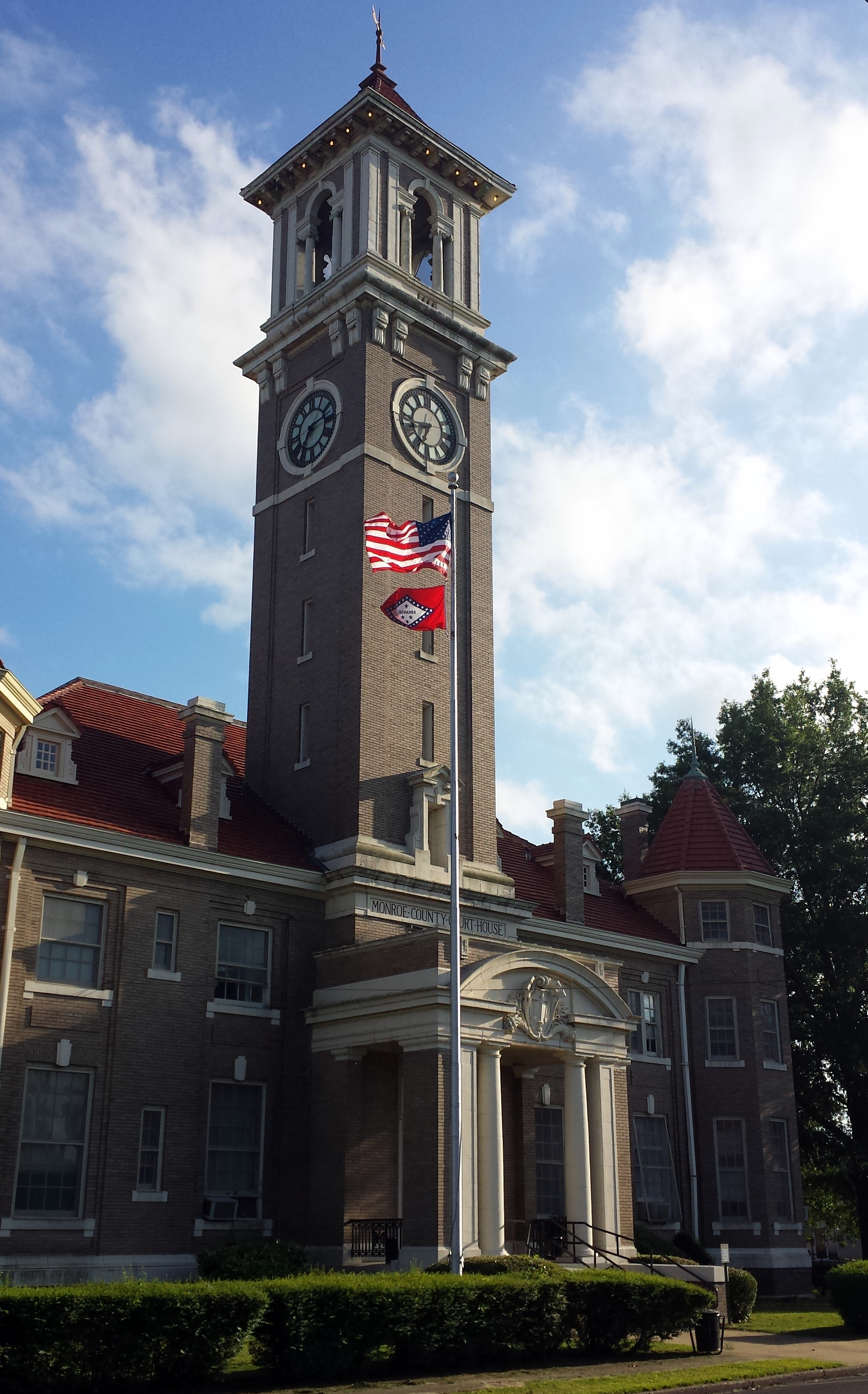
Monroe County Courthouse in Clarendon

Presiding over quorum court meetings is the county judge, who serves as the chief operating officer of the county. The county judge is elected at-large and does not vote in quorum court business, although capable of vetoing quorum court decisions.

== History ==
A constitutional amendment in 1974 radically reformed county government in Arkansas, though the county executive's titles are relics from the state's constitution. The reform, approved as Amendment 55 to the Arkansas Constitution of 1874, made sweeping changes to the structure of county government. County judges were transformed into county executives who worked with the quorum court to conduct county business, stripping the almost unfettered power they had accumulated since 1874. Quorum courts were reorganized to have between 9 and 15 JPs, based on county population. Several of the less populous counties have only nine members; only Benton County, Washington County, and Pulaski County have a fifteen-member quorum court. The quorum court was given power to set the salaries of county officials (within a state prescribed pay range), fill vacant county offices by appointment, and pass ordinances. Amendment 55 requires every quorum court to meet at least monthly.

A main impact of this reform was reducing the number of JP positions to increase legislative efficiency, reducing from 2,800 in 1974 to 751 in 1976. The effects of this reduction was a trend toward more professionally accomplished, higher status elected officials. This shift from "amateur" toward "professional" elected officials is typical of the good governance reforms such as Amendment 55. It also led to a sharp reduction in women and minorities holding county office.

A further reform, known as the Arkansas Plan, was proposed by Governor David Pryor in 1976 to expand county control beyond Amendment 55. The plan met strong resistance, and was ultimately defeated.

== Election commission ==
Each county has a three-member county election commission in charge of drawing districts for county office elections and preparing and holding elections. Districts are redrawn after each decennial census.
