= Watson, Arkansas =

- City
- Location of Watson in Desha County, Arkansas
- Coordinates: 33°53′43″N 91°15′12″W
- Country: United States
- State: Arkansas
- County: Desha

Area
  - Total: 0.20 sq mi (0.52 km^{2})
  - Land: 0.20 sq mi (0.52 km^{2})
  - Water: 0 sq mi (0.00 km^{2})
- Elevation: 151 ft (46 m)

Population (2020)
  - Total: 185
  - Estimate (2025): 160 ▼
  - Density: 925.9/sq mi (357.51/km^{2})
- Time zone: UTC-6 (Central (CST))
  - Summer (DST): UTC-5 (CDT)
- ZIP code: 71674
- Area code: 870
- FIPS code: 05-73550
- GNIS feature ID: 2405688

Watson is a city in Desha County, Arkansas, United States. As of the 2020 census, Watson had a population of 185.

== History ==
The Desha county seat was moved to Watson in October 1874 after bank erosion along the Mississippi River undermined Napoleon, which would eventually be abandoned. A vote in September 1879 relocated the county seat to Arkansas City.

== Geography ==
According to the United States Census Bureau, the city has a total area of 0.2 square miles (0.52 km^{2}), all land.

=== Delta Heritage Trail ===
In 1992, the Union Pacific Railroad discontinued service on a rail line which ran directly through Watson, and a 73 mi (117 km) right-of-way on which the rail line ran was donated to the State of Arkansas. Parts of the abandoned rail line have since been converted into the Delta Heritage Trail. A wilderness lies to the north of the town, where the trail will have views of the Arkansas River (from the Yancopin Bridge), and of the White River (from the Benzal Bridge). Between the bridges, the trail is planned to traverse old-growth hardwood forest within the Trusten Holder State Wildlife Management Area.

== Demographics ==
Historical population
Census	Pop.	Note	%±
1910	139		—
1920	254		82.7%
1930	282		11.0%
1940	236		−16.3%
1950	309		30.9%
1960	312		1.0%
1970	371		18.9%
1980	433		16.7%
1990	282		−34.9%
2000	288		2.1%
2010	211		−26.7%
2020	185		−12.3%
2025 (est.)	160	▼	−13.5%
U.S. Decennial Census

=== 2020 census ===
Watson racial composition
Race	Num.	Perc.
White (non-Hispanic)	120	64.86%
Black or African American (non-Hispanic)	54	29.19%
Native American	2	1.08%
Other/mixed-race	3	1.62%
Hispanic or Latino	6	3.24%

As of the 2020 United States census, there were 185 people, 115 households, and 68 families residing in the city.

=== 2000 census ===
As of the census of 2000, there were 288 people, 113 households, and 78 families residing in the city. The population density was 1,414.6 inhabitants per square mile (546.2/km^{2}). There were 125 housing units at an average density of 614.0 per square mile (237.1/km^{2}). The racial makeup of the city was 72.57% White, 24.65% Black or African American, 0.69% Native American, 0.69% Pacific Islander, and 1.39% from two or more races.

There were 113 households, out of which 25.7% had children under the age of 18 living with them, 48.7% were married couples living together, 12.4% had a female householder with no husband present, and 30.1% were non-families. 28.3% of all households were made up of individuals, and 17.7% had someone living alone who was 65 years of age or older. The average household size was 2.55 and the average family size was 3.10.

In the city, the population was spread out, with 24.0% under the age of 18, 7.3% from 18 to 24, 19.8% from 25 to 44, 26.0% from 45 to 64, and 22.9% who were 65 years of age or older. The median age was 44 years. For every 100 females, there were 94.6 males. For every 100 females age 18 and over, there were 87.2 males.

The median income for a household in the city was $17,143, and the median income for a family was $33,889. Males had a median income of $30,625 versus $15,313 for females. The per capita income for the city was $13,631. About 22.6% of families and 25.8% of the population were below the poverty line, including 40.5% of those under the age of eighteen and 23.0% of those 65 or over.

== Education ==
Watson is in the McGehee School District.

In 1972, the Watson School District merged into the Delta Special School District. On July 1, 2004, the Delta Special School District merged into the McGehee district.
