= Thane House =

Historic house in Arkansas, United States

- U.S. National Register of Historic Places
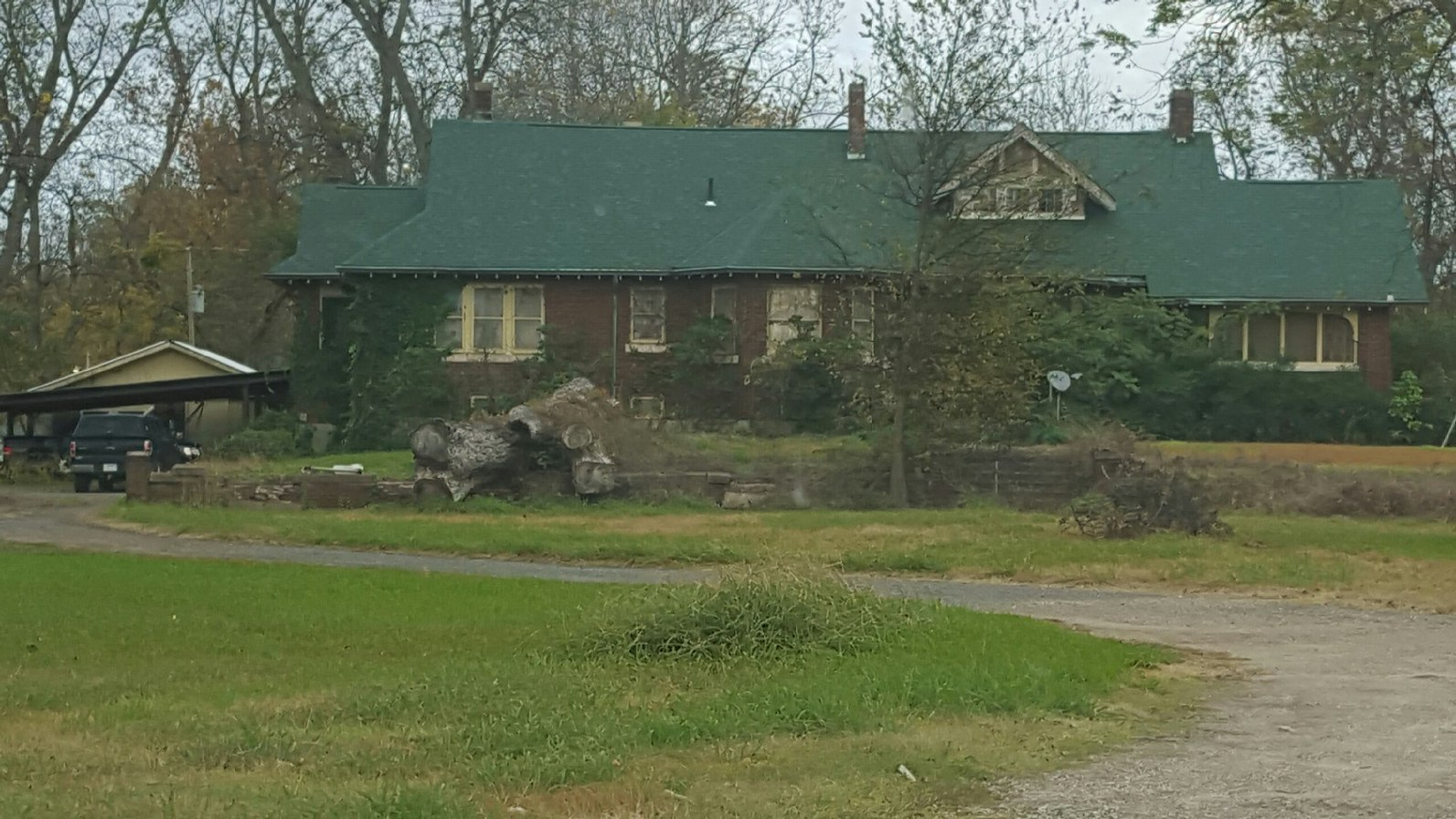

- Location within Arkansas Location within the United States
- Location: Levy and First Sts., Arkansas City, Arkansas
- Coordinates: 33°36′26″N 91°11′59″W
- Area: less than one acre
- Built: 1919
- Architect: Charles L. Thompson
- Architectural style: Bungalow/Craftsman style
- MPS: Thompson, Charles L., Design Collection TR
- NRHP reference No.: 82000810
- Added to NRHP: December 22, 1982

The Thane House is a historic residence at Levy and First Streets in Arkansas City, Arkansas, overlooking the Mississippi River. The 1½-story Craftsman style house was built for Henry Thane in 1909 to a design by Charles L. Thompson. It has a tile roof, with a steeply pitched gable dormer on the front facade. The center entry is recessed, with a projecting bay to one side which is capped by a three-sided roof. The eaves have exposed rafter ends, and the front gable has false half-timbering.

The house was listed on the National Register of Historic Places in 1982.

== See also ==
- National Register of Historic Places listings in Desha County, Arkansas
