= Arkansas City School District =

Defunct school district in Arkansas, United States

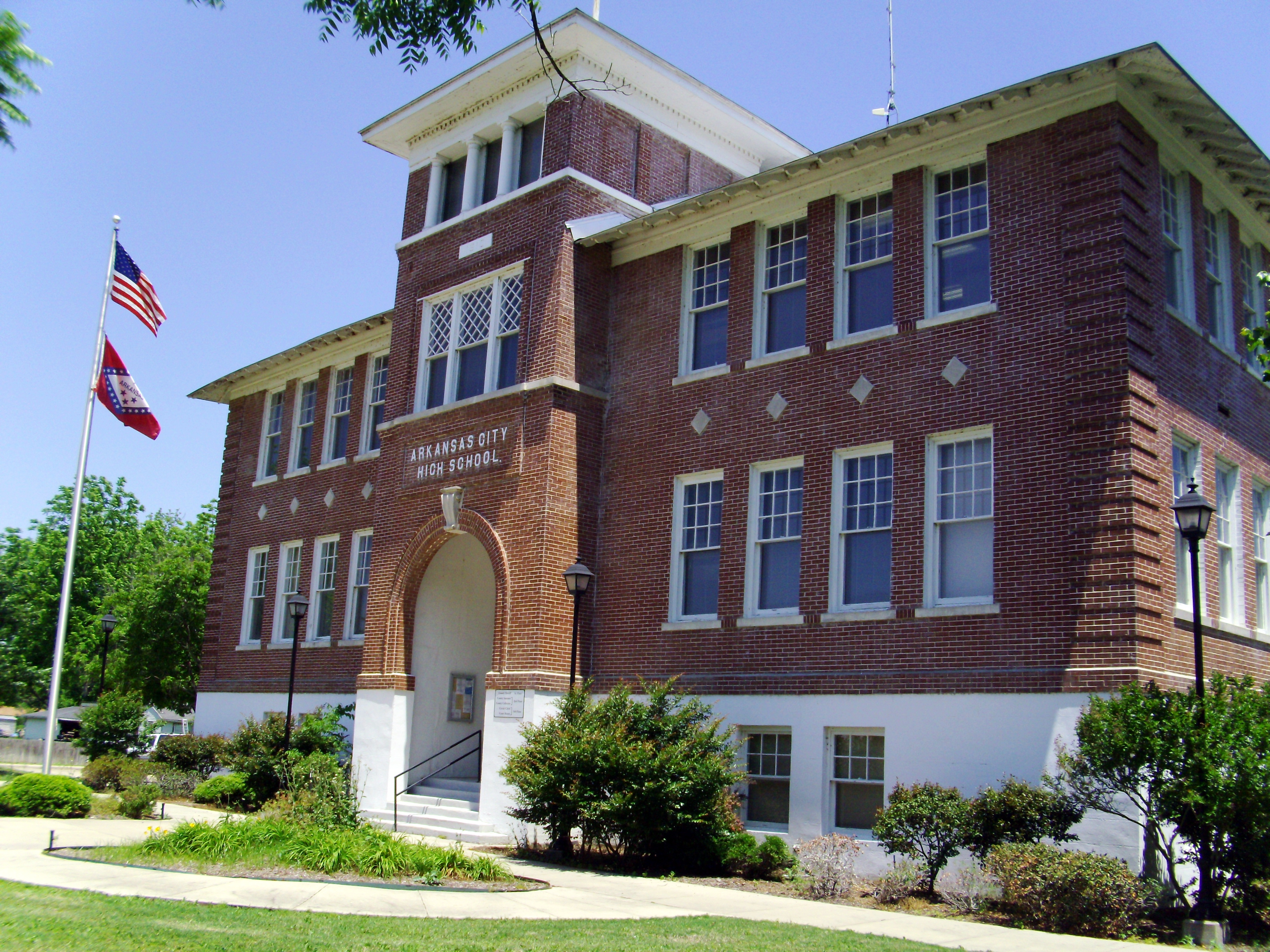
Arkansas City High School (pre-1983 building)

The Arkansas City School District was a school district of Arkansas City, Arkansas. Its territory is now in the McGehee School District.

The district had two schools, Arkansas City Elementary School and Arkansas City High School. The athletic mascot was the river rat.

The district facility was located 15 miles (24 km) east of McGehee.

== History ==
In 2004 the Arkansas Legislature approved a law that forced school districts with fewer than 350 students apiece to consolidate with other districts. On July 1, 2004, the Arkansas City School District and the Delta Special School District were merged into the McGehee district.
