= Delta Special School District =

Defunct school district in Arkansas, United States

Location
- Desha County, Arkansas; United States

District information
- Established: 1972
- Closed: July 1, 2004,

The Delta Special School District was a school district of Rohwer, unincorporated Desha County, Arkansas, USA. Its territory is now in the McGehee School District. It also included Watson.

The district had two schools, Delta Elementary School and Delta High School.

The district facility was located 12 miles (19 km) northeast of McGehee.

== History ==
The district formed in 1972 by the merger of the Desha Special School District and the Watson School District.

In 2004, the Arkansas Legislature approved a law that forced school districts with fewer than 350 students to consolidate with other districts. Both the McGehee and Delta school districts petitioned the Arkansas Board of Education, asking for an annexation of Delta into McGehee. The board approved the annexation on April 26, 2004. On July 1, 2004, the Delta Special School District and the Arkansas City School District were merged into the McGehee district.
