= Dumas Public Schools =

School district in Arkansas

Dumas Public Schools is a school district headquartered in Dumas, Arkansas. It serves territory in Desha and Lincoln counties, including Dumas, Gould, Mitchellville, and Winchester. It also serves Arkansas Department of Corrections prison property (Cummins Unit).

== History ==
The Wells Bayou district merged into the Dumas district in 1969.

In July 1993 the Desha-Drew School District dissolved, with portions going to Dumas Public Schools and to the McGehee School District.

In 2004 the Arkansas Legislature approved a law that forced school districts with fewer than 350 students apiece to consolidate with other districts. As a result, on July 1, 2004, the Gould School District was merged into the Dumas district. At the time of the merger, according to a June 30, 2004 audit report, the Gould district had a $322,873 deficit. The Dumas district inherited the Gould district's deficit. Thomas Cox, the superintendent of the Dumas district, opposed the merger; in May 2004 he told the Arkansas Board of Education that it would increase the racial imbalance in the school district as African-American percentage of the Dumas district would increase from 64% to 68%; at the time the Gould district was 99% African-American. The former superintendent of the Gould district became an assistant superintendent of the Dumas district.

== Attendance area ==
Within Desha County, it includes Dumas and Mitchellville.

Within Lincoln County, it includes Gould. It also serves Arkansas Department of Corrections prison property (Cummins Unit).

The district extends into Drew County, where it serves Winchester.

== Schools ==
Its schools include Central Elementary School, Dumas Junior High School, and Dumas High School.

In previous eras, Central had grades PreK-1, Reed Elementary School had grades 2-6, Dumas Jr. High had 7-8, and Dumas High had 9-12.

After the merger with the Gould School District, the Dumas district inherited the Gould school facilities. The 2004-2005 Arkansas School Directory listed Gould Elementary School and Gould High School as being a part of the Dumas district. The Dumas district planned to, effective fall of 2005, move all Gould students in grades 7-12 to the Dumas schools, and considered doing the same to the elementary school students from Gould. The 2005-2006 Arkansas School Directory did not list any Gould school facilities.
