= Desha-Drew School District =

Defunct school district in Arkansas, United States

Location
- Arkansas; United States of America

District information
- Closed: July 1, 1993

Desha-Drew School District was a school district in Desha and Drew counties in the U.S. state of Arkansas, with the administration in Desha County.

It operated the B. C. Prewitt Memorial Elementary and Junior High School in Tillar. It also operated a school called Tillar School.

In 1989 34.9% of the certified employees were black while 94.4% of the student body was black.

On July 1, 1993, it was disestablished with territory given to the Dumas School District and the McGehee School District.
