= Yancopin Bridge =

Abandoned railroad moveable bridge spanning the Arkansas River

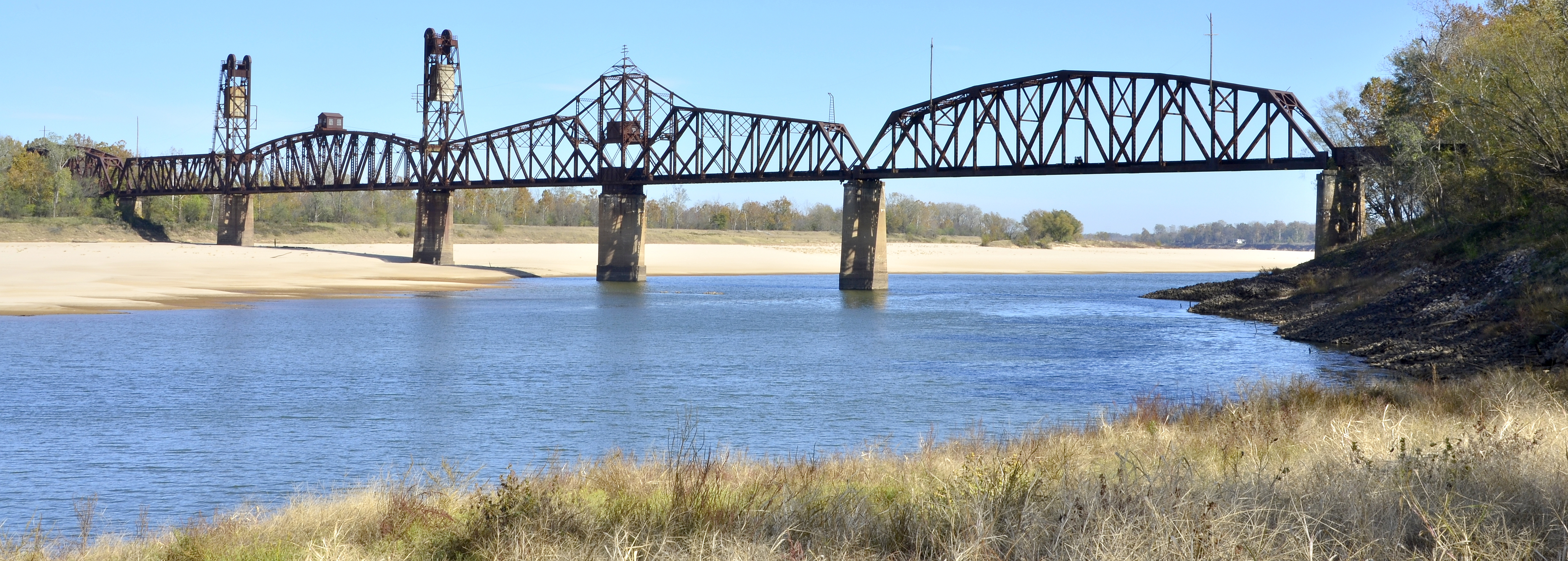
- View from south bank of Arkansas River
- Coordinates: 33.955304°N 91.206075°W
- Locale: Watson, Arkansas

Location
- Interactive map of Yancopin Bridge

The Yancopin Bridge is an abandoned railroad moveable bridge spanning the Arkansas River, and the last bridge across the Arkansas River before it flows into the Mississippi River 15 miles to the southeast. It is distinctive not only for its size and remoteness, but also for having not one but two movable spans, one having replaced the other due to river avulsion.

The Yancopin Bridge was originally constructed by the Memphis, Helena & Louisiana Railway, a wholly owned subsidiary of the St. Louis, Iron Mountain and Southern Railway that was known colloquially as Iron Mountain. The Iron Mountain itself became consolidated with the Missouri Pacific Railroad in 1881, but became fully merged later on in 1917. The single-track bridge is an all-metal truss bridge, designed with one lift span and with lengthy wooden trestle approaches at both ends.

== History ==
The bridge was reportedly completed in 1903, but the track segment served by this bridge, between Watson and New Latour, was not opened for service until March 1, 1906. Floods periodically brought changes to the Arkansas River channel and necessitated numerous rebuilding projects for the bridge over the years, including the addition of a swing span sometime after World War II as the navigable channel under the lift span drifted shut. Articles in Missouri Pacific Lines Magazine describe this bridge as being perhaps the most expensive bridge on the entire Missouri Pacific system.

On May 11, 1941, Missouri Pacific inaugurated the Delta Eagle, the railroad's first diesel-powered streamlined train serving Arkansas. This train operated between Memphis, Tennessee and Tallulah, Louisiana via the Yancopin bridge. Although this unlikely route was financially very successful during World War II, traffic gradually declined in the 1950s and passenger service was cut back on October 27, 1954 to include only a McGehee-Watson-Yancopin-Helena schedule. This truncated schedule often utilized Missouri Pacific's only streamlined motorcar known as the Eagle, motor 670, before passenger service was discontinued altogether on February 27, 1960, thus ending passenger train service over the Yancopin bridge.

In April 1980, the Missouri Pacific began a major upgrading of their railroad line between McGehee and Paragould, in order to divert chemical trains from a route passing through highly populated areas of Little Rock. After installation of 127 miles of welded rail, trackside signals, centralized traffic control and numerous bridge repair projects, chemical trains from the Texas and Louisiana Gulf coasts began using this new line in early 1981. This usage was short-lived. In December 1982, the Missouri Pacific merged with the Union Pacific Railroad, and the new Union Pacific management determined that the route over the Yancopin bridge was surplus and unnecessary. Chemical traffic was again returned to the traditional Missouri Pacific route through the center of Little Rock, and parts of the railroad north of McGehee were embargoed and later abandoned.

In 1992, Union Pacific removed the bridge from service, and donated it and a 73-mile right-of-way to the State of Arkansas. This enabled the creation of the Delta Heritage Trail. The bridge is maintained by the Arkansas State Highway and Transportation Department, and the swing span is manually spun open and closed for logging traffic on the river for several months every year.

The area around the bridge is rich in wildlife, including rattlesnakes. North of the Yancopin Bridge, the rail line/trail traverses old-growth hardwood forest within the Trusten Holder State Wildlife Management Area.

The bridge can be accessed from Watson, Arkansas, via County Road 41.

== See also ==
- List of crossings of the Arkansas River
- Oregon Trunk Rail Bridge – bridge in which a lift span was added to replace a swing span's function
