= W. H. Logan =

American politician in Arkansas

Member of the Arkansas Senate from the 15th district
- In office January 10, 1887 – January 12, 1891
- Preceded by: Henry Thane
- Succeeded by: George W. Bell

Personal details
- Born: Ohio
- Party: Republican

W. H. Logan was an American farmer, preacher, teacher and politician in the Arkansas Delta. He served in the Arkansas Senate from 1887 to 1891. He was born in Ohio in the first half of the 1850s. During his career he served as a justice of the peace, preacher, teacher, and farmer.

Loagan represented Arkansas Senate District 15 which included parts of Chicot and Desha counties He was a Republican.

== See also ==
- African American officeholders from the end of the Civil War until before 1900
