= Winchester, Arkansas =

- Town
- Location of Winchester in Drew County, Arkansas.
- Coordinates: 33°46′27″N 91°28′25″W
- Country: United States
- State: Arkansas
- County: Drew

Area
  - Total: 0.50 sq mi (1.29 km^{2})
  - Land: 0.50 sq mi (1.29 km^{2})
  - Water: 0 sq mi (0.00 km^{2})
- Elevation: 148 ft (45 m)

Population (2020)
  - Total: 137
  - Estimate (2025): 137
  - Density: 275.5/sq mi (106.37/km^{2})
- Time zone: UTC-6 (Central (CST))
  - Summer (DST): UTC-5 (CDT)
- ZIP code: 71677
- Area code: 870
- FIPS code: 05-76010
- GNIS feature ID: 2406896

Winchester is a small town in northeast Drew County, Arkansas, United States. As of the 2020 census, Winchester had a population of 137. The population declined from its 20th-century high of 279 in 1980.

== Geography ==
According to the United States Census Bureau, the town has a total area of 0.5 mi^{2} (1.3 km^{2}), all land.

== Demographics ==
Historical population
Census	Pop.	Note	%±
1920	217		—
1930	221		1.8%
1940	171		−22.6%
1950	198		15.8%
1960	185		−6.6%
1970	234		26.5%
1980	279		19.2%
1990	239		−14.3%
2000	191		−20.1%
2010	167		−12.6%
2020	137		−18.0%
2025 (est.)	137	Steady	0.0%
U.S. Decennial Census

=== 2020 Census ===
Winchester, Arkansas – Racial and ethnic composition Note: the US Census treats Hispanic/Latino as an ethnic category. This table excludes Latinos from the racial categories and assigns them to a separate category. Hispanics/Latinos may be of any race.
Race / Ethnicity (NH = Non-Hispanic)	Pop 2000	Pop 2010	Pop 2020	% 2000	% 2010	% 2020
White alone (NH)	56	45	20	29.32%	26.95%	14.60%
Black or African American alone (NH)	124	115	110	64.92%	68.86%	80.29%
Native American or Alaska Native alone (NH)	2	1	2	1.05%	0.60%	1.46%
Asian alone (NH)	0	2	0	0.00%	1.20%	0.00%
Pacific Islander alone (NH)	0	0	0	0.00%	0.00%	0.00%
Other race alone (NH)	0	0	0	0.00%	0.00%	0.00%
Mixed race or Multiracial (NH)	2	4	1	1.05%	2.40%	0.73%
Hispanic or Latino (any race)	7	0	4	3.66%	0.00%	2.92%
Total	191	167	137	100.00%	100.00%	100.00%

=== 2000 census ===
As of the census of 2000, there were 191 people, 69 households, and 52 families residing in the city. The population density was 147.5/km^{2} (383.6/mi^{2}). There were 78 housing units at an average density of 60.2/km^{2} (156.7/mi^{2}). The racial makeup of the town was 29.32% White, 64.92% Black or African American, 1.05% Native American, 3.66% from other races, and 1.05% from two or more races. 3.66% of the population were Hispanic or Latino of any race.

There were 69 households, out of which 37.7% had children under the age of 18 living with them, 53.6% were married couples living together, 20.3% had a female householder with no husband present, and 23.2% were non-families. 23.2% of all households were made up of individuals, and 13.0% had someone living alone who was 65 years of age or older. The average household size was 2.77 and the average family size was 3.25.

In the city the population was spread out, with 31.9% under the age of 18, 6.3% from 18 to 24, 24.6% from 25 to 44, 23.6% from 45 to 64, and 13.6% who were 65 years of age or older. The median age was 36 years. For every 100 females, there were 96.9 males. For every 100 females age 18 and over, there were 91.2 males.

The median income for a household in the city was $24,375, and the median income for a family was $29,750. Males had a median income of $29,583 versus $11,250 for females. The per capita income for the city was $10,397. About 12.8% of families and 17.0% of the population were below the poverty line, including 27.8% of those under the age of eighteen and 28.0% of those 65 or over.

== Education ==
It is in the Dumas School District, which operates Dumas High School.

== Gallery ==
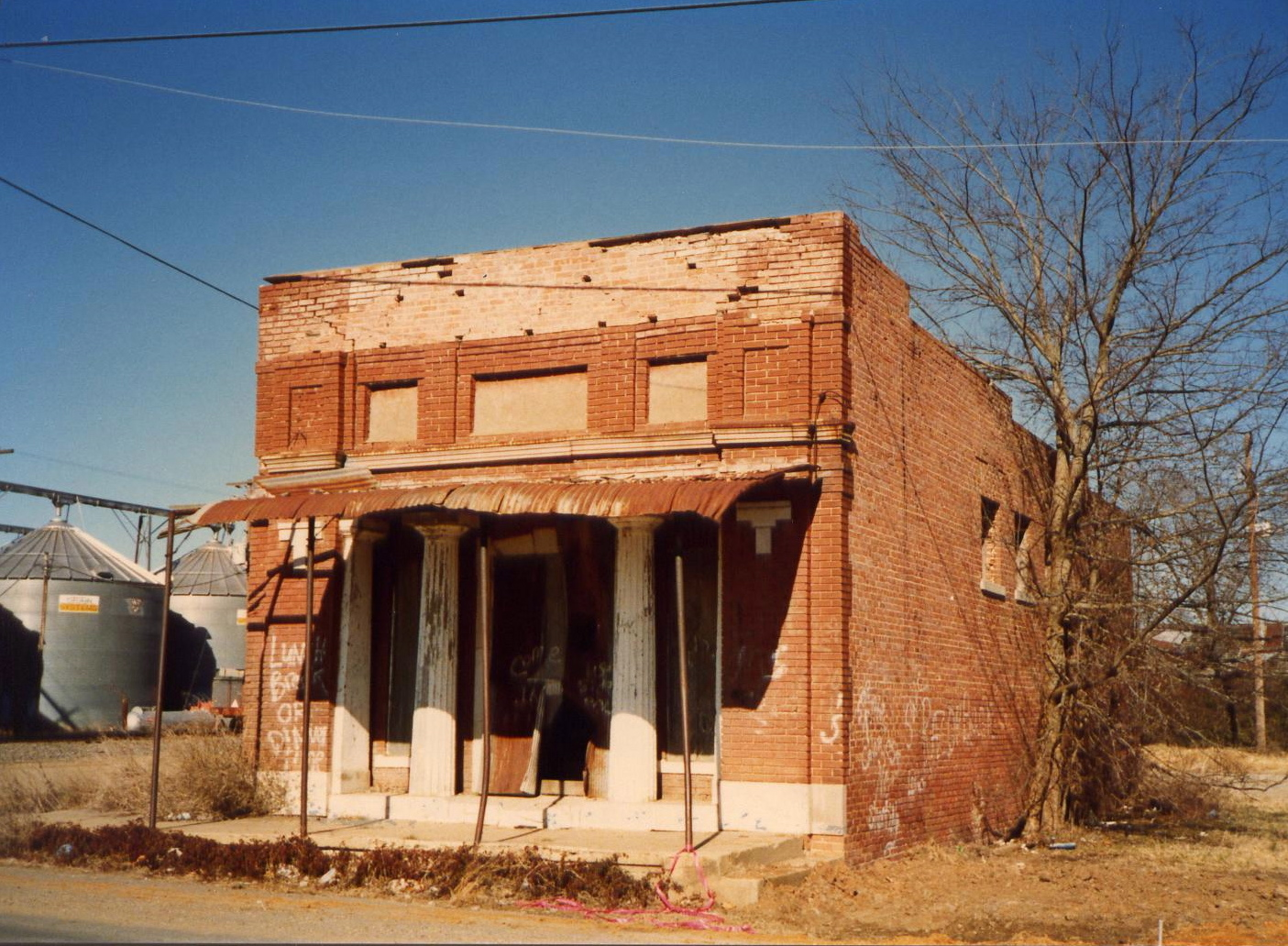
Vacant store, 1989.

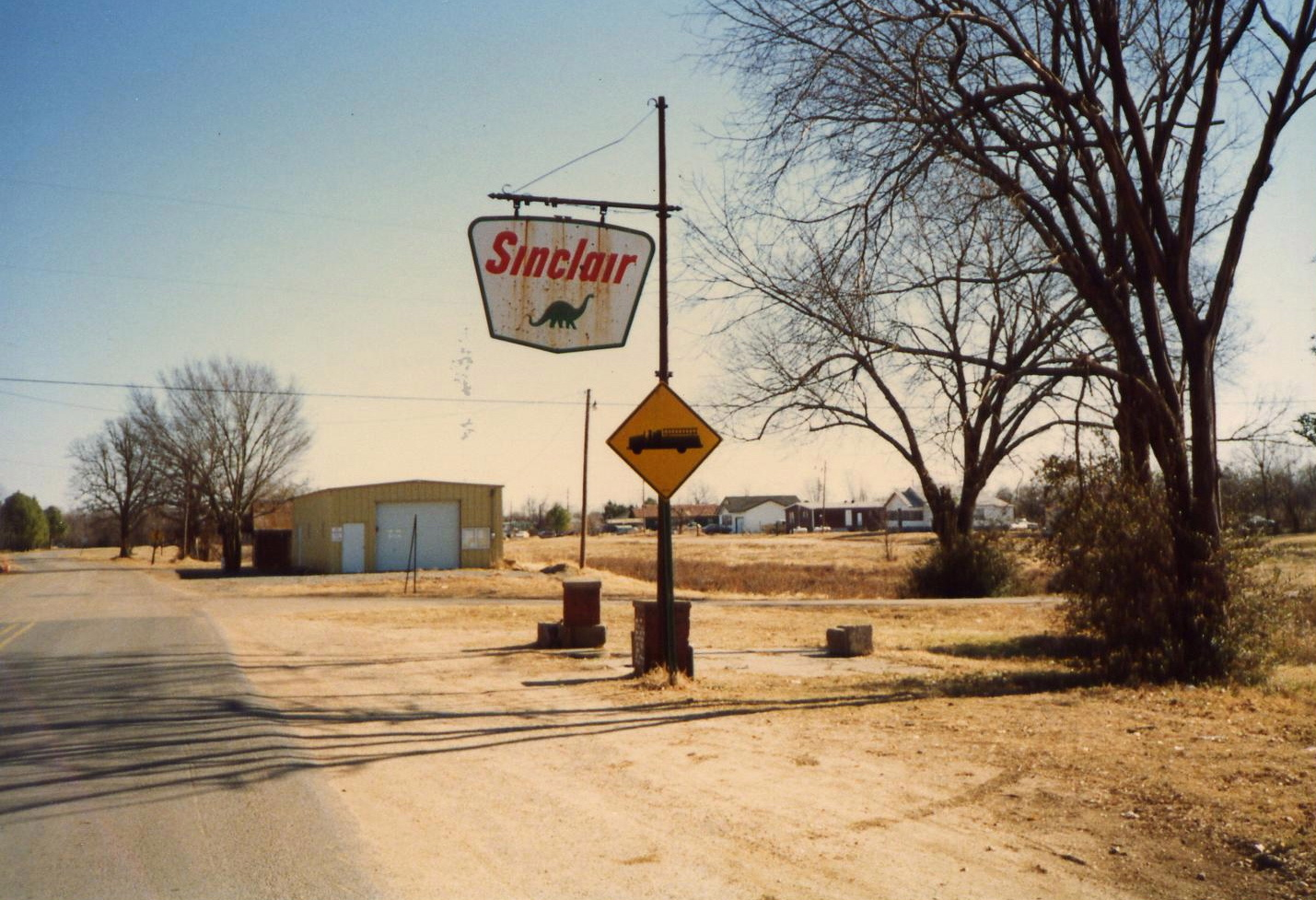
Location of former service station, 1989.

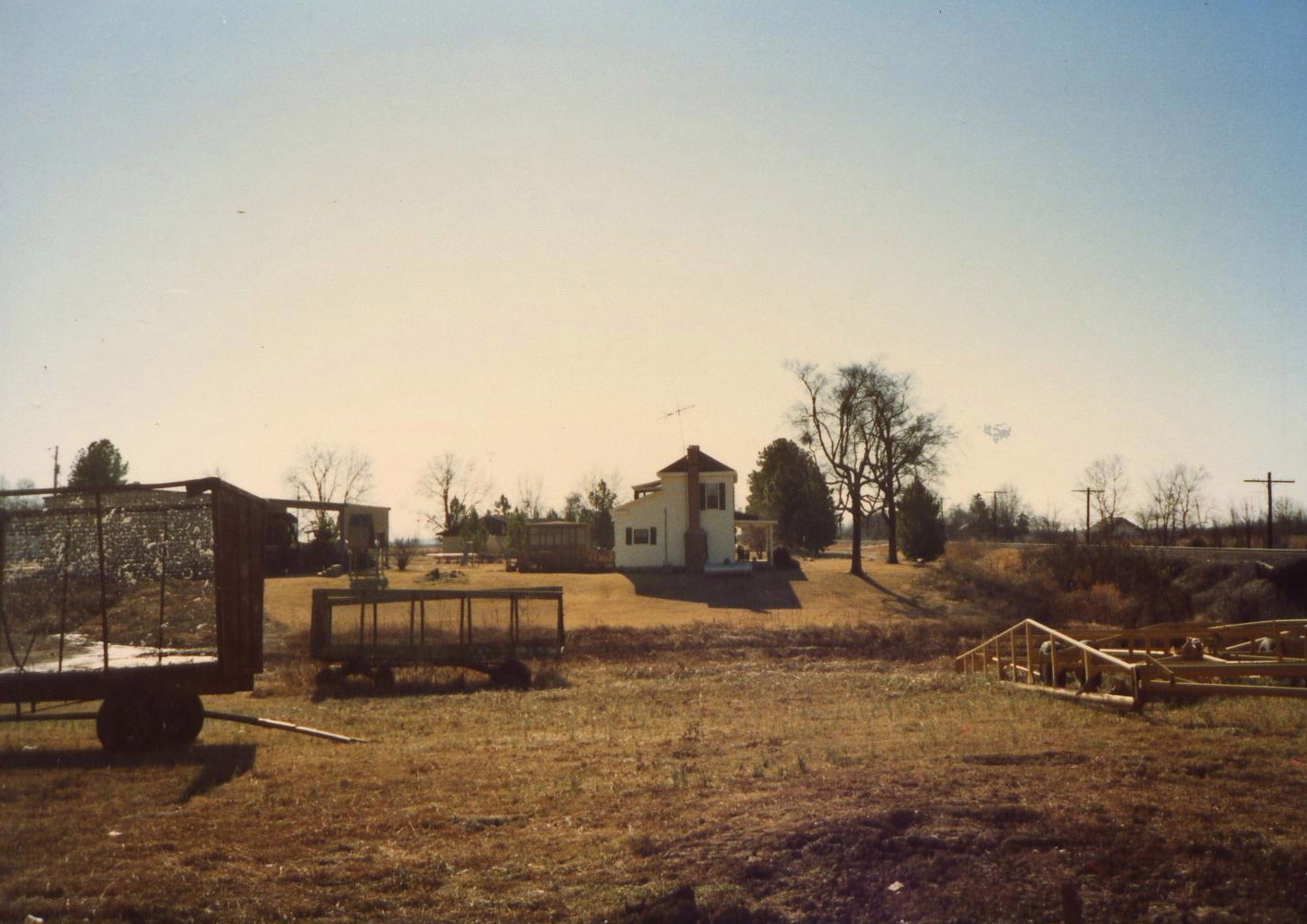
Collins-Morris house and farm equipment seen from across Bayou Bartholomew, 1989. This 1868 house was destroyed by fire in March 2026.

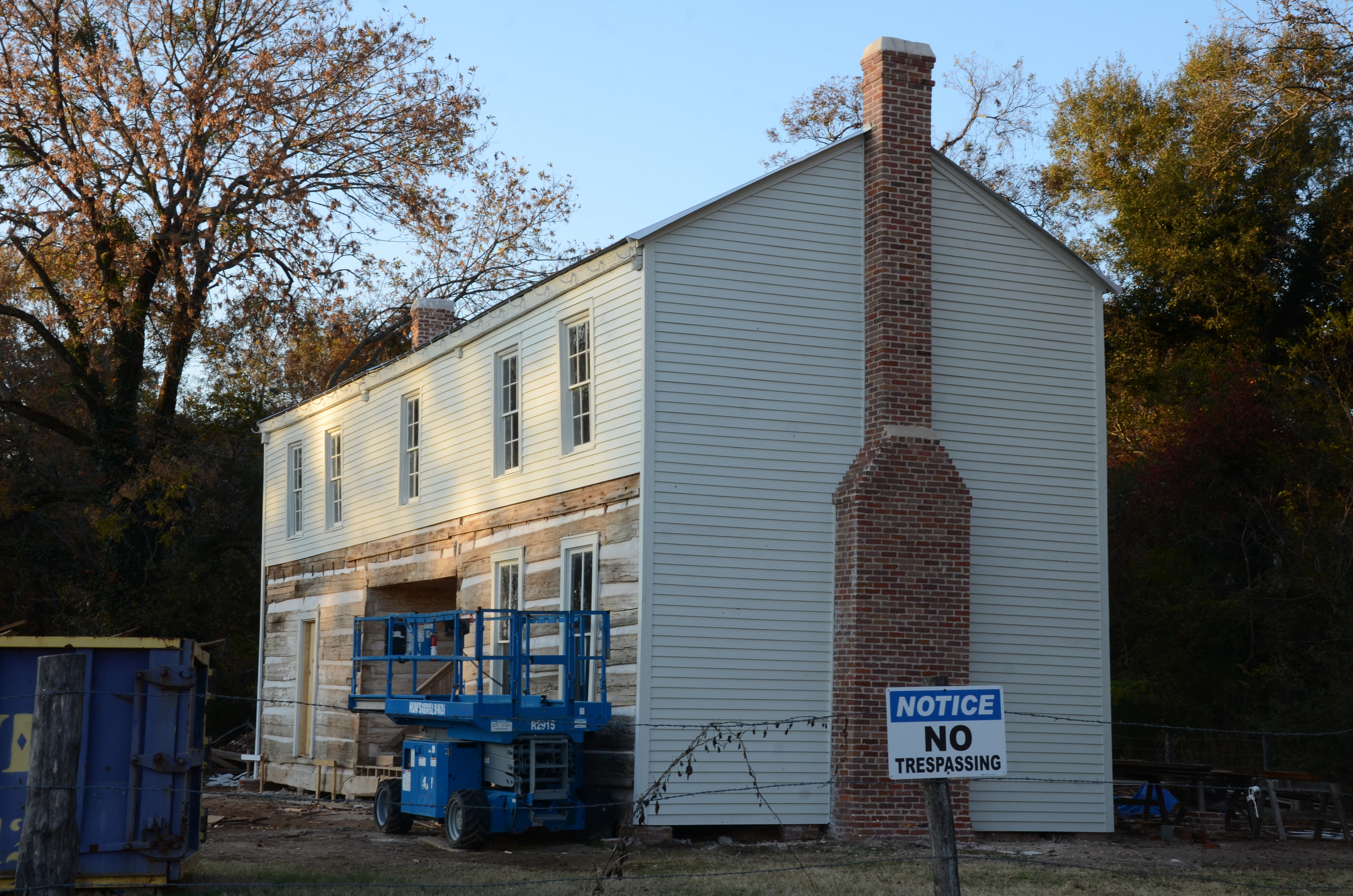
Historic Taylor Log House in 2016.
