= Arkansas City Commercial District =

Historic district in Arkansas, United States

- U.S. National Register of Historic Places
- U.S. Historic district
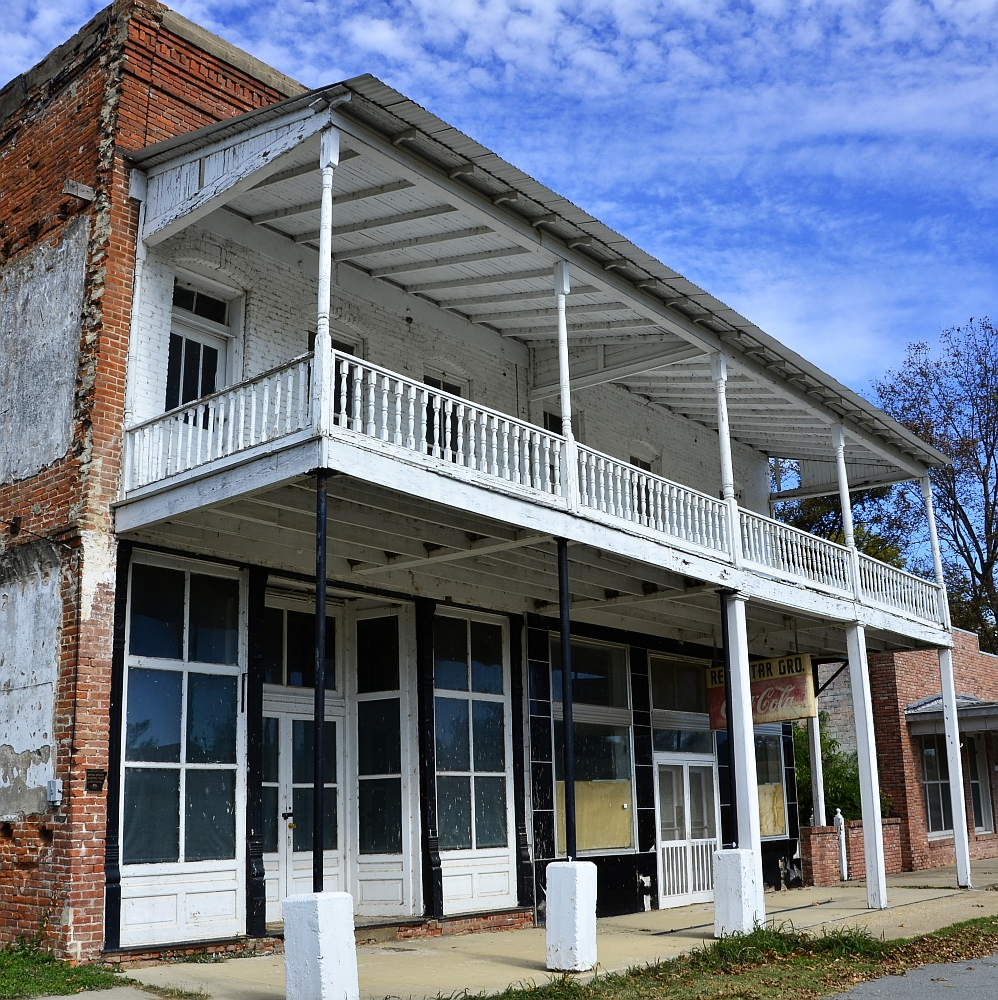

- Location within Arkansas Location within the United States
- Location: Roughly along the jct. of Desoto Ave. and Sprague St., Arkansas City, Arkansas
- Coordinates: 33°36′19″N 91°12′13″W
- Area: less than one acre
- Built: 1900
- Architectural style: Early Commercial
- NRHP reference No.: 99000227
- Added to NRHP: February 18, 1999

The Arkansas City Commercial District encompasses the three oldest surviving commercial buildings in Arkansas City, Arkansas. They are located along Sprague (4th) Avenue, between Kate Adams (1st) Street and De Soto Avenue, and are a reminder of a once-thriving commercial district in the city. The Cotham Drug Store, a two-story brick building from c. 1900, stands near the corner of Sprague and De Soto, facing south. The Red Star Grocery, built 1900, stands to its right; it is also a two-story brick building, but its facade has been altered, replacing a recessed doorway with a flush one. Stylistically the two buildings are similar, with brick corbelling and a course of dentil molding, with a parapet above. The third building is the Ramus Brothers Market, which stands on Sprague Street, and was built in 1910 out of poured concrete.

The district was listed on the National Register of Historic Places in 1999.

== See also ==
- National Register of Historic Places listings in Desha County, Arkansas
