= Henry Thane =

American politician (1850–1938)

Member of the Arkansas Senate from the 15th district
- In office January 8, 1883 – January 10, 1887
- Preceded by: C. H. Carlton
- Succeeded by: W. H. Logan

Personal details
- Born: February 10, 1850 Germany
- Died: July 4, 1938 (aged 88) Desha County, Arkansas
- Resting place: Holly Grove Cemetery
- Occupation: Lawyer, businessman, politician

Christian Heinrich "Henry" Thane (February 10, 1850 – July 4, 1938) was a wealthy businessman and bank owner in Arkansas. His Craftsman-style home, Thane House, was designed by Little Rock architect Charles L. Thompson. It is listed on the National Register of Historic Places. He was a Republican.

Thane was born in Germany and raised in Metropolis, Illinois. An important figure in the development of Arkansas City, he held various political offices, including mayor. He worked as a lawyer for the Little Rock, Pine Bluff & New Orleans Railroad, owned a lumber mill, and a bank.

Thane was elected to the Arkansas Senate and served representing the 15th District (Desha and Chicot counties) in the 24th Arkansas General Assembly and the 25th Arkansas General Assembly.

Thame's photograph is included in a composite of 1885 Arkansas State Senate members.
