= Gould School District =

Former school district in Arkansas

The Gould School District was a school district that operated public schools in Gould, Arkansas. Its territory is now a part of the Dumas School District.

It previously served children who were dependents of staff living on the property of the Cummins Unit.

== History ==
The Gould School District stated that in September 1964 Gould became the first previously segregated school district in the United States to completely racially integrate. The Encyclopedia of Arkansas stated that the district integrated in September 1967. In 1968, when the Gould School District started a night program at the Cummins Unit, an Arkansas Department of Correction prison.

Prior to 1991 the Gould School District, which by then had an almost completely black student body, had a transfer policy which allowed area residents to attend other schools. About 100 White children in the district boundaries used the policy to attend other schools. In 1991 the school board unanimously voted to end the program and ruled that students must attend Gould schools beginning in the fall of 1991. Many White parents protested the decision; some threatened to take legal action and some said that they would never send their children to Gould schools. Some area parents feared that the decision would lead to White families moving out of the school district and crippling the district's tax base. Alan Minor, the president of the Gould school board, said that it had no choice because the Arkansas State Board of Education withheld $200,000 ($472758.37 when adjusted for inflation) in bond revenues since the state believed that the Gould district was promoting segregation. Sharon Streett, the Arkansas Department of Education's chief legal counsel, said that the state does not want to be perceived to be promoting racial segregation. Minor said that he did not expect for very many additional White students to be enrolled in the fall of 1991, because he heard some parents state that they would move.

In 2004 the Arkansas Legislature approved a law that forced school districts with fewer than 350 students apiece to consolidate with other districts. A March 1, 2004 board meeting, board member Norvell Dixon advanced a resolution for consolidating with the Grady School District under the Provisions of Act 60. Another board member, Lee Dale, seconded the motion, which was carried. Another motion, advanced by Dale, stated that the new school board should be named the Lincoln County Special School District and that it should have five board members. Dixon seconded the notion, which carried. In May 2004 the state board of education rejected the voluntary proposal to consolidate the Grady district with the Gould district, because both school districts were majority African American and the merger would have violated federal desegregation laws.

Ronald S. Laurent, the superintendent of the Gould school district, said that merging with the Dumas School District was the board's second choice, because most Gould residents traveled to Dumas on a daily basis and had a familiarity with the Dumas community. Laurent argued that merging with Dumas was preferable to merging with the Star City School District, because Gould was 9 miles (14 km) from Dumas, while the distance between Gould and Star City is at or over 18 miles (29 km). Laurent argued that the closer proximity would make it easier for Gould parents to be involved in their children's education. JoNell Caldwell, the chairperson of the state board of education, was in favor of the merger because she did not support an alternative arrangement of the Gould students traveling 20 miles (32 km) by school bus to their school. Thomas Cox, the superintendent of the Dumas district, opposed the merger; in May 2004 he told the Arkansas Board of Education that it would increase the racial imbalance in the school district as African-American percentage of the Dumas district would increase from 64% to 68%. The former superintendent of the Gould district became an assistant superintendent of the Dumas district. Luke Gordy, a state board of education member from Van Buren, also opposed the merger out of concerns with the racial makeup. Rhonda Mullikin, the superintendent of the Star City School District, opposed merging the Gould district with the Star City School District because Star City was already taking in students of the Grady school district and Mullikin said that she feared that the Star City school district could not handle the influx of students from another school district.

One week after the state voted down the proposed Gould-Grady merger, the state board of education narrowly voted in favor of consolidating the Gould district with the Dumas district. Caldwell broke the tie, voting in favor of the merger. On July 1, 2004, the Gould district was merged into the Dumas district. At the time of the merger, according to a June 30, 2004 audit report, the Gould district had a $322,873 deficit ($550351.7 when considering inflation). The Dumas district inherited the Gould district's deficit.

== Demographics ==
At the time of the district's closure, in the 2003–2004 school year, the Gould district was 99% African-American. In 1991 the district, almost entirely African-American, had about 350 black students.

== Schools ==
In 2003 the district had Gould Elementary School (K-4), Gould Middle School (5-8), and Gould High School (9-12). The three divisions were on two campuses.

Wash Coleman and Albert Rash opened the first school for black students in a former saw mill cabin. The first school for whites opened in 1918 at a site now occupied by the First Baptist Church. In 1923 the district built a three-story brick building that was later occupied by Gould Elementary. In the 1956–1957 school year the building burned. In 1964 another elementary school building opened next to the Gould High School.

== Uniforms ==
From the 2002–2003 school year to its final school year of existence, the school district required its students to wear school uniforms in all grades. The school district began enforcing the rule in August 2002.
