= Mitchellville, Arkansas =

- City
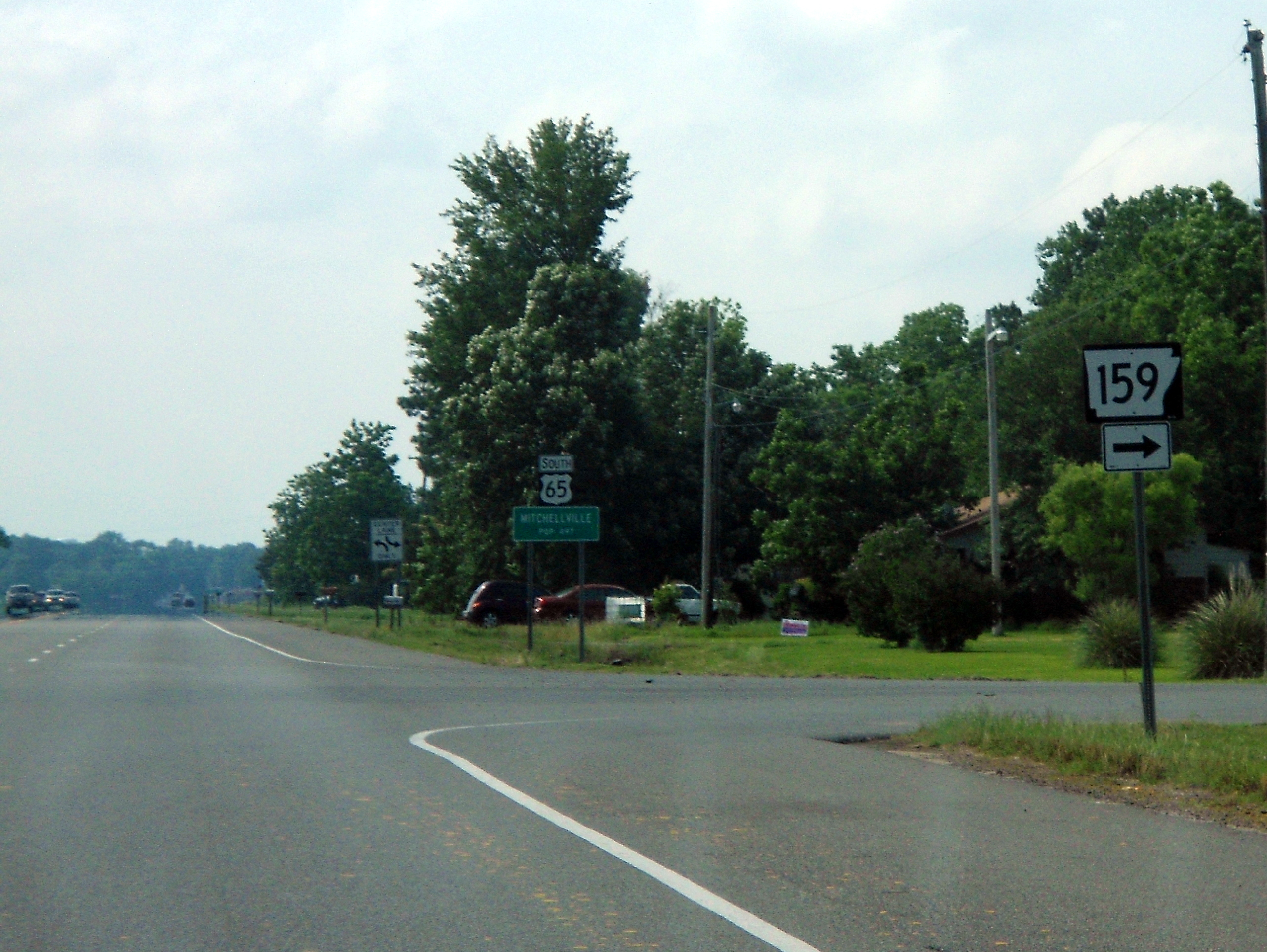

- Location of Mitchellville in Desha County, Arkansas
- Coordinates: 33°54′20″N 91°29′58″W
- Country: United States
- State: Arkansas
- County: Desha

Area
  - Total: 0.12 sq mi (0.31 km^{2})
  - Land: 0.12 sq mi (0.31 km^{2})
  - Water: 0 sq mi (0.00 km^{2})
- Elevation: 161 ft (49 m)

Population (2020)
  - Total: 293
  - Estimate (2025): 258 ▼
  - Density: 2,431.9/sq mi (938.96/km^{2})
- Time zone: UTC-6 (Central (CST))
  - Summer (DST): UTC-5 (CDT)
- ZIP code: 71639
- Area code: 870
- FIPS code: 05-46190
- GNIS feature ID: 2404276

Mitchellville is a city in Desha County, Arkansas, United States. As of the 2020 census, Mitchellville had a population of 293.

== Geography ==
According to the United States Census Bureau, the city has a total area of 0.3 square miles (0.78 km^{2}), all land.

== Demographics ==
Historical population
| Census | Pop. | Note | %± |
|---|---|---|---|
| 1970 | 494 | | — |
| 1980 | 618 | | 25.1% |
| 1990 | 513 | | −17.0% |
| 2000 | 497 | | −3.1% |
| 2010 | 360 | | −27.6% |
| 2020 | 293 | | −18.6% |
| 2025 (est.) | 258 | ▼ | −11.9% |
U.S. Decennial Census

=== 2020 Census ===
Mitchellville, Arkansas – racial and ethnic composition Note: the US Census treats Hispanic/Latino as an ethnic category. This table excludes Latinos from the racial categories and assigns them to a separate category. Hispanics/Latinos may be of any race.
| Race / ethnicity (NH = Non-Hispanic) | Pop 2000 | Pop 2010 | Pop 2020 | % 2000 | % 2010 | % 2020 |
|---|---|---|---|---|---|---|
| White alone (NH) | 2 | 10 | 1 | 0.40% | 2.78% | 0.34% |
| Black or African American alone (NH) | 487 | 335 | 273 | 97.99% | 93.06% | 93.17% |
| Native American or Alaska Native alone (NH) | 0 | 0 | 0 | 0.00% | 0.00% | 0.00% |
| Asian alone (NH) | 1 | 0 | 4 | 0.20% | 0.00% | 1.37% |
| Native Hawaiian or Pacific Islander alone (NH) | 0 | 0 | 0 | 0.00% | 0.00% | 0.00% |
| Other race alone (NH) | 0 | 0 | 0 | 0.00% | 0.00% | 0.00% |
| Mixed race or Multiracial (NH) | 1 | 2 | 3 | 0.20% | 0.56% | 1.02% |
| Hispanic or Latino (any race) | 6 | 13 | 12 | 1.21% | 3.61% | 4.10% |
| Total | 497 | 360 | 293 | 100.00% | 100.00% | 100.00% |

As of the census of 2000, there were 497 people, 180 households, and 129 families residing in the city. The population density was 3,322.5 inhabitants per square mile (1,282.8/km^{2}). There were 197 housing units at an average density of 1,316.9 per square mile (508.5/km^{2}). The racial makeup of the city was 0.40% White, 98.19% Black or African American, 0.20% Asian, 1.01% from other races, and 0.20% from two or more races. 1.21% of the population were Hispanic or Latino of any race.

There were 180 households, out of which 38.9% had children under the age of 18 living with them, 30.6% were married couples living together, 35.0% had a female householder with no husband present, and 28.3% were non-families. 26.1% of all households were made up of individuals, and 12.8% had someone living alone who was 65 years of age or older. The average household size was 2.76 and the average family size was 3.33.

In the city, the population was spread out, with 38.0% under the age of 18, 9.3% from 18 to 24, 18.7% from 25 to 44, 20.9% from 45 to 64, and 13.1% who were 65 years of age or older. The median age was 29 years. For every 100 females, there were 75.6 males. For every 100 females age 18 and over, there were 64.7 males.

The median income for a household in the city was $17,625, and the median income for a family was $19,500. Males had a median income of $20,000 versus $16,042 for females. The per capita income for the city was $8,680. About 39.2% of families and 43.7% of the population were below the poverty line, including 56.9% of those under age 18 and 53.8% of those age 65 or over.

== Education ==
The Dumas School District serves Mitchellville.
