= Gould, Arkansas =

- City
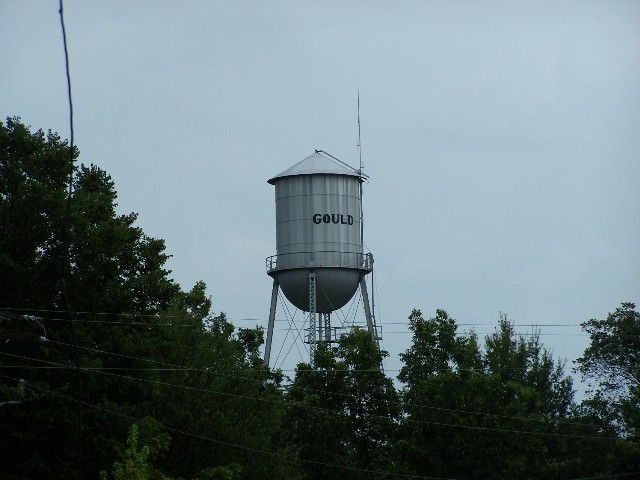
- Gould water tower

- Location in Lincoln County, Arkansas
- Coordinates: 33°59′14″N 91°33′51″W
- Country: United States
- State: Arkansas
- County: Lincoln

Area
  - Total: 1.55 sq mi (4.02 km^{2})
  - Land: 1.55 sq mi (4.02 km^{2})
  - Water: 0 sq mi (0.00 km^{2})
- Elevation: 167 ft (51 m)

Population (2020)
  - Total: 663
  - Estimate (2025): 621 ▼
  - Density: 427.5/sq mi (165.06/km^{2})
- Time zone: UTC-6 (Central (CST))
  - Summer (DST): UTC-5 (CDT)
- ZIP code: 71643
- Area code: 870
- FIPS code: 05-27730
- GNIS feature ID: 2403718

Gould is a city in Lincoln County, Arkansas, United States. Its population was 663 at the 2020 census, down from 837 at the 2010 census. Gould is a farming community. It was named after the American railroad magnate Jay Gould.

== Geography ==
Gould is located in northeastern Lincoln County. U.S. Route 65 passes through the city, leading northwest 33 miles (53 km) to Pine Bluff and southeast 27 miles (43 km) to McGehee. Arkansas Highway 114 leads west from Gould 17 miles (27 km) to Star City, while Highway 212 leads east 12 miles (19 km) to Pendleton on the Arkansas River.

According to the United States Census Bureau, the city of Gould has a total area of 1.5 square miles (4.0 km^{2}), all land. It sits near the western edge of the Arkansas Delta in the Delta Lowlands sub-region.

Gould is 79 miles (127 km) by highway southeast of Little Rock. The area is in proximity to the Cummins Unit state prison, as well as the Varner Unit state prison.

== Demographics ==
Historical population
Census	Pop.	Note	%±
1910	57		—
1920	318		457.9%
1930	827		160.1%
1940	908		9.8%
1950	1,076		18.5%
1960	1,210		12.5%
1970	1,386		14.5%
1980	1,671		20.6%
1990	1,470		−12.0%
2000	1,305		−11.2%
2010	837		−35.9%
2020	663		−20.8%
2025 (est.)	621	▼	−6.3%
U.S. Decennial Census

=== 2020 census ===
Gould racial composition
Race	Number	Percentage
White (non-Hispanic)	68	10.26%
Black or African American (non-Hispanic)	570	85.97%
Native American	2	0.3%
Other/Mixed	14	2.11%
Hispanic or Latino	9	1.36%

As of the 2020 United States census, there were 663 people, 408 households, and 196 families residing in the city.

=== 2000 census ===
As of the census of 2000, there were 1,305 people, 498 households, and 340 families residing in the city. The population density was 844.4 inhabitants per square mile (326.0/km^{2}). There were 602 housing units at an average density of 389.5 per square mile (150.4/km^{2}). The racial makeup of the city was 78.01% Black or African American, 20.23% White, 0.38% Native American, 0.08% Asian, 0.77% from other races, and 0.54% from two or more races. 1.07% of the population were Hispanic or Latino of any race.

There were 498 households, out of which 32.5% had children under the age of 18 living with them, 30.9% were married couples living together, 32.3% had a female householder with no husband present, and 31.7% were non-families. 28.3% of all households were made up of individuals, and 15.1% had someone living alone who was 65 years of age or older. The average household size was 2.61 and the average family size was 3.17.

In the city, the population was spread out, with 31.9% under the age of 18, 10.1% from 18 to 24, 22.2% from 25 to 44, 20.3% from 45 to 64, and 15.5% who were 65 years of age or older. The median age was 32 years. For every 100 females, there were 79.0 males. For every 100 females age 18 and over, there were 70.6 males.

The median income for a household in the city was $19,031, and the median income for a family was $24,028. Males had a median income of $25,833 versus $18,583 for females. The per capita income for the city was $11,881. About 28.0% of families and 35.3% of the population were below the poverty line, including 42.9% of those under age 18 and 33.6% of those age 65 or over.

== Government and infrastructure ==
=== Local government ===
Earnest Nash, Jr. was the mayor of Gould from 2011 to 2020. He is a member of the Gould Citizens Advisory Council, a political group.

Around 2011 Gould had almost $300,000 ($429363.91 when adjusted for inflation) in unpaid taxes. The mayor, the group, and the city council experienced conflict over how to pay the taxes. The council believed that the citizen's group was trying to take too much influence in the city government. In June 2011 the council passed an ordinance saying that it is illegal to form any group without the permission of the city council. The mayor vetoed the law. On July 12, 2011, the council overrode the veto. The council also overrode a veto on a bill stating that the citizen's council may no longer exist and that the mayor may not meet with any organization in any location inside or outside the Gould city limits without the permission of the city council. The mayor stated that he refuses to stop meeting with groups, and that he would go to jail if given the choice between going to jail or not associating with the group. Nash said that the ordinances were not allowed under the U.S. Constitution and that Gould citizens are generally ignoring them. On Monday, July 18, 2011, Sonya Farley, a council member, said that the council plans to rewrite the ordinances in a manner that is constitutional. In August 2011 the city council repealed the ordinances.

Donna Terrell, a reporter at KLRT-TV Fox 16 News of Little Rock, said "You've got to be kidding me" when she heard about the ordinances. Terrell added that in communities "where everyone knows everyone" political conflict became very severe. Mark Hayes, the general counsel of the Arkansas Municipal League, said "I've seen some humdingers, but never any ordinance like this." Robbie Brown of The New York Times said that the ordinances are an indicator that Gould's politics had become "nasty". Brown added that legal scholars said that the law forbidding the formation of groups without the city council's permission was blatantly unconstitutional.

On July 28, 2011, a man assaulted Nash, who accused his assailant of being allied with his political opponents. On Wednesday August 20, 2011, the two men were arrested in connection with the assault. One individual was originally charged with a felony but in April 2012 the charges were downgraded to a misdemeanor, and the other individual had his criminal charges dismissed.

=== Federal representation ===
The United States Postal Service operates the Gould Post Office.

== Education ==
Prior to the advent of court-mandated integration, separate schools were maintained for White and Black students. When courts ordered the schools to integrate, Gould established a "freedom of choice plan". In 1968, the US Supreme court declared that Gould's plan was unacceptable, and ordered Gould to integrate the schools without further delay. When the newly integrated schools opened September 2, most White students did not attend, instead waiting until October 1 to enroll in Southeast Academy, a hastily organized, unaccredited segregation academy. Some White parents proposed reducing the property tax rate in order to defund the public schools and free up funds to support the segregation academy. In the fall of 1975 less than 70 students showed up for registration at Southeast Academy, and the school closed down.

Many White students transferred to districts that were more predominantly White; between 1982 and 1986 at least 115 children transferred to either Star City or Dumas. The result of the students transferring cost the school district around $100,000 per year in state funding, and left the district's ability to meet state standards in doubt. Of the 148 students who attended the integrated high school on opening day in 1986, only one was White.

In 2004, the Gould School District was incorporated into the Dumas Public School District in accordance with a law passed by the Arkansas Legislature that eliminated school districts with fewer than 350 students. In the fall of 2005 the Dumas district planned to move all Gould students in grades 7-12 to the Dumas schools, and considered doing the same to the elementary school students from Gould.

== Bankruptcy ==
In 2008 the town declared Chapter 9 bankruptcy.

== Notable people ==
- John Donley, award-winning writer of many sitcoms including Good Times and Sanford and Son.
- Cleo Miller, retired running back for the Kansas City Chiefs and the Cleveland Browns; born in Gould
- Ozell Sutton, civil rights activist, born near Gould on a plantation
