= McGehee School District =

School district in Arkansas

Location
- 409 Oak Street; McGehee, Arkansas 71654 United States

District information
- Grades: PK–12
- Accreditation: AdvancED
- Schools: 2
- NCES District ID: 0509630

Students and staff
- Students: 1,188
- Teachers: 98.14 (on FTE basis)
- Staff: 211.14 (on FTE basis)
- Student–teacher ratio: 12.11
- Athletic conference: 3A Region 6 (football); 3A Region 8 (basketball)
- District mascot: Owl
- Colors: Red; White

Other information
- Website: www.mcgeheeschools.org

McGehee School District is a public school district headquartered in McGehee, Arkansas, United States. The school district encompasses 499.14 square miles (1,292.8 km^{2}) of land, in Drew and Desha counties.

== History ==
In July 1993 the Desha-Drew School District dissolved, with portions going to the McGehee School District and the other going to Dumas Public Schools.

In 2004 the Arkansas Legislature approved a law that forced school districts with fewer than 350 students to consolidate with other districts. On July 1, 2004, the Arkansas City School District and the Delta Special School District were subsumed into the McGehee district.

In 2011 an African-American student sued the district for forcing her to share valedictorian status with a white student who had a lower grade point average (GPA). The students both had one B grade, and otherwise all A grades, but the white student had 1.5 more regular course credits, which due to course weighting resulted in her lower GPA. The case was dismissed in US District Court in 2013, which found that the school acted according to its published policy that in determining class rank, "a student with a greater number of courses will not be penalized."

== Attendance area ==
In Desha County, the district includes: McGehee, Arkansas City, Reed, Watson, and that county's portion of Tillar. It also includes the unincorporated area of Rohwer, and Rosedale. The district also extends into Drew County, where it includes that county's portion of Tillar.

== Schools ==
The schools are McGehee Elementary School (prekindergarten through grade 6), McGehee Jr. High School (grades 7 through 8), and McGehee High School (grades 9 through 12). The schools and the district are accredited by the Arkansas Department of Education (ADE) and AdvancED.

Previously the middle school division was called Conner Junior High School. After the acquisition of the Delta Special School District, the McGehee district continued to operate Delta Elementary School and Delta High School. After the acquisition of the Arkansas City School District, it operated the Arkansas City campus as a K-6 school. By October 2005 the district no longer operated the Arkansas City facility, and the Delta campus became elementary only. The Delta campus housed the district's Alternative Learning Environment (ALE) program. By October 2006 the Delta campus was no longer in operation.
