= Arkansas City, Texas =

Ghost town in Texas, US

- Ghost town
- Location in Texas
- Coordinates: 26.6614468°N 98.4341828°W
- Country: United States
- State: Texas
- County: Starr
- Elevation: 302 ft (92 m)

Arkansas City is a ghost town in Starr County, Texas, United States. Situated on Farm to Market Road 2294, it was a supply center for ranchers. It peaked during the 1950s and 1960s, with two businesses—one a factory—and 40 residents. Only three houses remained by 1991.
