= Rohwer, Arkansas =

- Unincorporated community
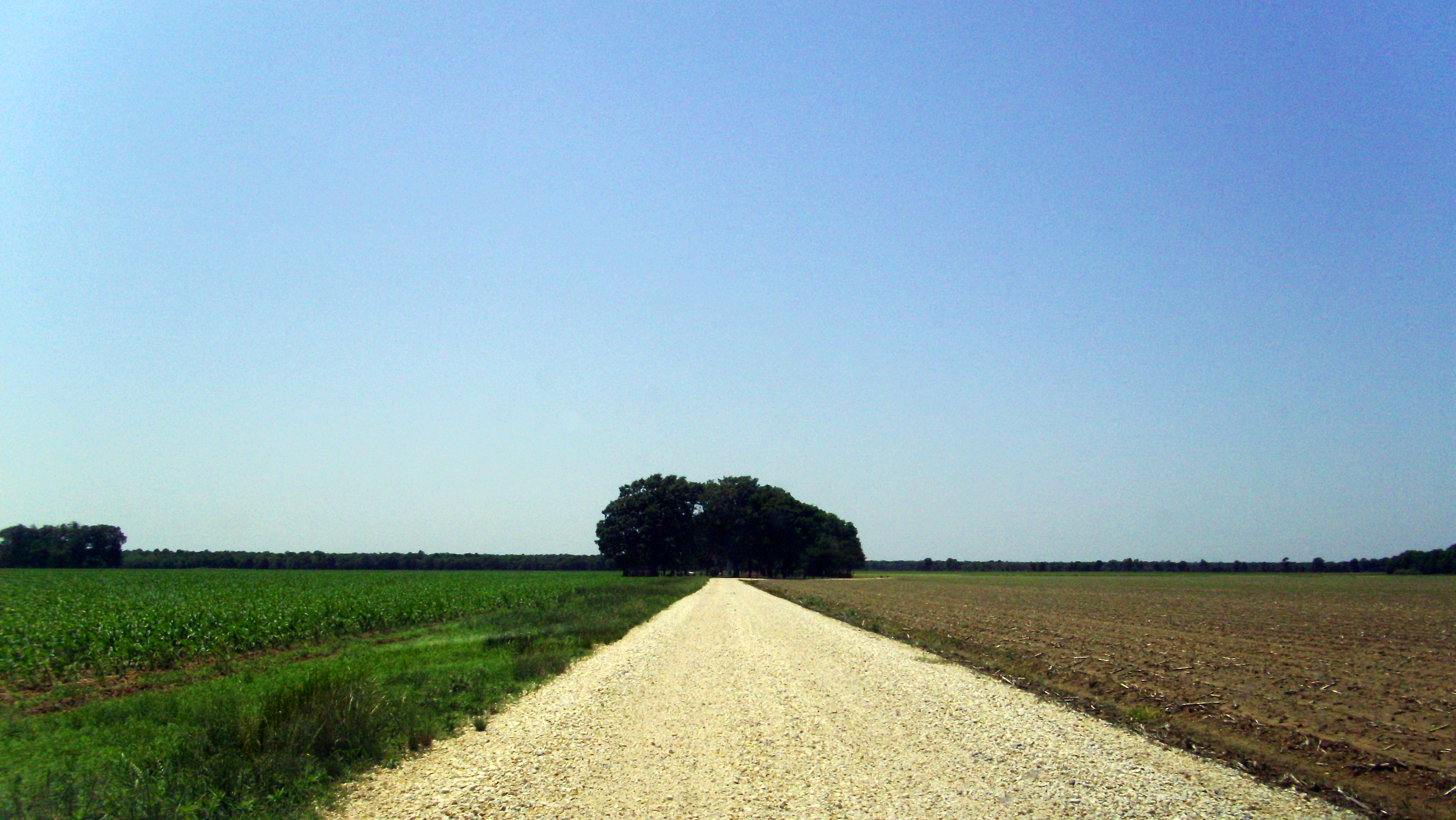
- Rohwer War Relocation Center on the flat Delta horizon

- Location in Arkansas Rohwer (the United States)
- Coordinates: 33°45′39″N 91°16′32″W
- Country: United States
- State: Arkansas
- County: Desha
- Township: Richland
- Elevation: 148 ft (45 m)
- Time zone: UTC-6 (Central (CST))
  - Summer (DST): UTC-5 (CDT)
- ZIP code: 71666
- GNIS feature ID: 58514

Rohwer, Arkansas is an unincorporated community in Desha County, Arkansas, United States. The community is located on Arkansas Highway 1.

== History ==
The area was a Japanese internment camp, designed during World War II by the architect Edward F. Neild of Shreveport, Louisiana. The camp opened in March 1942. It is now the site of the Rohwer War Relocation Center.

== Climate ==
The climate in this area is characterized by hot, humid summers and generally mild to cool winters. According to the Köppen Climate Classification system, Rohwer has a humid subtropical climate, abbreviated "Cfa" on climate maps.

== Education ==
The McGehee School District serves Rohwer.

Previously, the Delta Special School District served Rohwer. The district had two schools, Delta Elementary School and Delta High School. In 2004, the Arkansas Legislature approved a law that forced school districts with fewer than 350 students to consolidate with other districts. On July 1, 2004, the Delta Special District merged into the McGehee District. After the acquisition of the Delta Special School District, the McGehee district continued to operate Delta Elementary School and Delta High School. By October 2005, the Delta campus became elementary only. By October 2006, the Delta campus was no longer in operation.

== Notable people ==
- Ruth Asawa, sculptor, lived as a child at the Rohwer War Relocation Center
- Sheilla Lampkin, Arkansas state legislator, born in Rohwer
- George Takei, actor, lived as a child at the Rohwer War Relocation Center
