= Desha County Courthouse =

- U.S. National Register of Historic Places
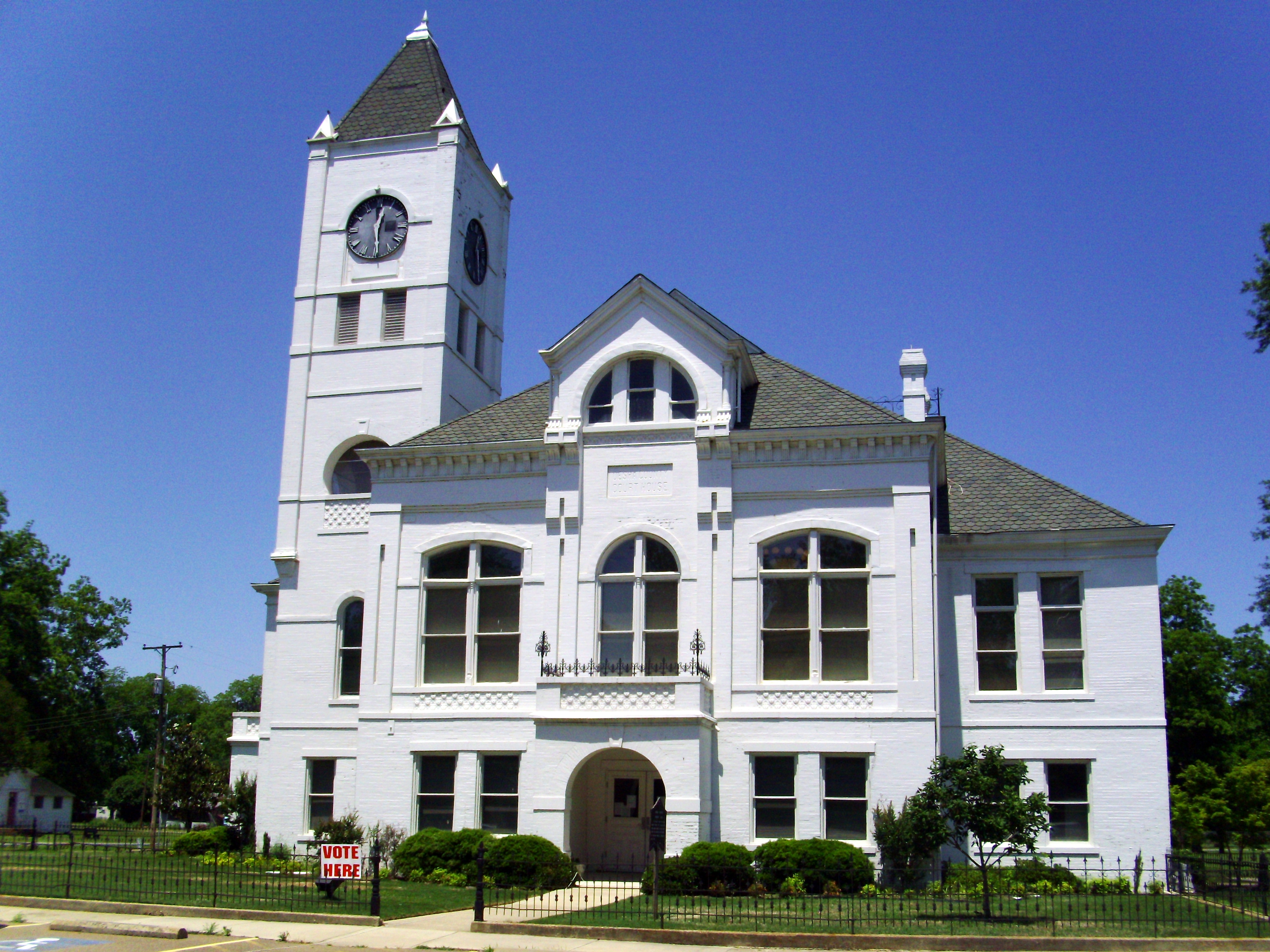

- Location within Arkansas Location within the United States
- Location: Robert S. Moore Ave., Arkansas City, Arkansas
- Coordinates: 33°36′33″N 91°12′8″W
- Area: less than one acre
- Built: 1900
- Architect: Harding, Rome
- Architectural style: Romanesque Revival
- NRHP reference No.: 76000403
- Added to NRHP: July 12, 1976

The Desha County Courthouse, on Robert S. Moore Avenue in Arkansas City, Arkansas, is the county seat of Desha County. The 2 1/2-story Romanesque Revival brick building was built in 1900 to a design by Little Rock architect Rome Harding. Its most distinctive feature is its four-story square tower, which features doubled rectangular windows on the first level, a round-arch window on the second, an open round arch on the third, and clock faces on the fourth level. The tower is topped by a pyramidal roof with finial.

The building was listed on the National Register of Historic Places in 1976.

== See also ==
- National Register of Historic Places listings in Desha County, Arkansas
