= Arkansas City, Arkansas =

Town in Arkansas, United States

- Town
- Town of Arkansas City
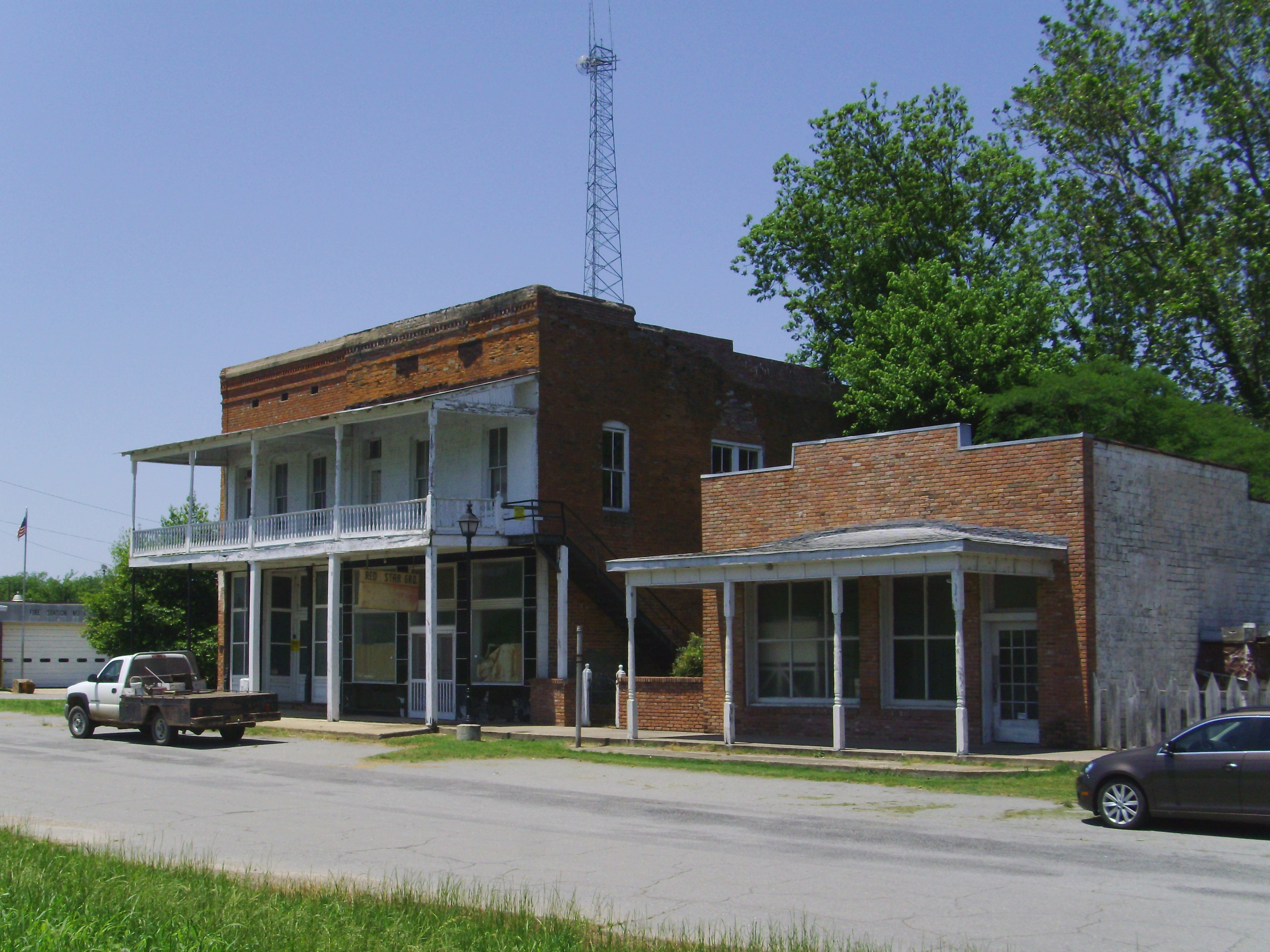
- Downtown Arkansas City

- Location in Desha County and Arkansas

- Location in the United States
- Coordinates: 33°36′32″N 91°12′18″W
- Country: United States
- State: Arkansas
- County: Desha
- Township: Franklin
- Incorporated: September 12, 1873 (153 years ago)

Government
  - Type: Mayor–Council
  - Mayor: Carolyn Bissett
  - Council: Town Council

Area
  - Total: 0.49 sq mi (1.28 km^{2})
  - Land: 0.49 sq mi (1.28 km^{2})
  - Water: 0 sq mi (0.00 km^{2})
- Elevation: 138 ft (42 m)

Population (2020)
  - Total: 376
  - Estimate (2025): 336 ▼
  - Density: 763.8/sq mi (294.89/km^{2})
- Time zone: UTC-6 (Central (CST))
  - Summer (DST): UTC-5 (CDT)
- ZIP code: 71630
- Area code: 870
- FIPS code: 05-01990
- GNIS feature ID: 2403112
- Website: arkansascityusa.com

Arkansas City (/ˈɑːrkənsɔː/) is a town in and the county seat of Desha County, Arkansas, United States. The town population was 376 at the 2020 census. With a population of 345 at the 2024 Census estimate, it is the least populous county seat in Arkansas. Arkansas City Commercial District, located at Desoto Avenue and Sprague Street, is listed on the National Register of Historic Places.

== History ==
Arkansas City, since 1879 the county seat of Desha County, was incorporated by the Chicot County Court on September 12, 1873, being then, and for some years later, in Chicot County. From 1879, it grew into a thriving riverport for the next forty years. It had a natural harbor for steamboats and two railways, as well as fourteen saloons and three sawmills. An opera house was moved to Arkansas City in 1891. The building was also used as an unofficial "town hall"; at other times it became a ballroom, and citizens danced to music of groups from Memphis, Tennessee.

Until the flood of 1927, Arkansas City was an important commercial and cultural center and one of the most important ports on the Mississippi River. The flood devastated the settlement. More than 2,000 people had to be rescued. As a result, the riverport closed and made the railroads unnecessary.

== Geography ==
According to the United States Census Bureau, the town has a total area of 0.5 square miles (1.3 km^{2}), all land. It sits entirely in the Delta Lowlands sub-region of the Arkansas Delta.

== Demographics ==
=== 2020 census ===
Arkansas City racial composition
Race	Num.	Perc.
White (non-Hispanic)	193	51.33%
Black or African American (non-Hispanic)	162	43.09%
Native American	1	0.27%
Other/Mixed	13	3.46%
Hispanic or Latino	7	1.86%

As of the 2020 United States census, there were 376 people, 174 households, and 140 families residing in the city.

=== 2000 census ===
As of the census of 2000, there were 589 people, 231 households, and 161 families residing in the town. The population density was 1,232.2 inhabitants per square mile (475.8/km^{2}). There were 279 housing units at an average density of 583.7 per square mile (225.4/km^{2}). The racial makeup of the town was 55.01% White, 43.80% Black or African American, and 1.19% from two or more races. 3.23% of the population were Hispanic or Latino of any race.

There were 231 households, out of which 32.9% had children under the age of 18 living with them, 45.0% were married couples living together, 17.7% had a female householder with no husband present, and 30.3% were non-families. 27.3% of all households were made up of individuals, and 11.7% had someone living alone who was 65 years of age or older. The average household size was 2.55 and the average family size was 3.05.

In the town, the population was spread out, with 28.4% under the age of 18, 7.8% from 18 to 24, 26.0% from 25 to 44, 25.0% from 45 to 64, and 12.9% who were 65 years of age or older. The median age was 36 years. For every 100 females, there were 82.4 males. For every 100 females age 18 and over, there were 79.6 males.

The median income for a household in the town was $22,014, and the median income for a family was $27,500. Males had a median income of $36,250 versus $17,188 for females. The per capita income for the town was $14,523. About 25.3% of families and 31.8% of the population were below the poverty line, including 41.6% of those under age 18 and 37.6% of those age 65 or over.

=== 1880–2020 census ===
Historical population
Census	Pop.	Note	%±
1880	503		—
1900	1,091		—
1910	1,485		36.1%
1920	1,482		−0.2%
1930	1,432		−3.4%
1940	1,446		1.0%
1950	1,018		−29.6%
1960	783		−23.1%
1970	615		−21.5%
1980	668		8.6%
1990	523		−21.7%
2000	589		12.6%
2010	366		−37.9%
2020	376		2.7%
2025 (est.)	336	▼	−10.6%
U.S. Decennial Census

== Education ==
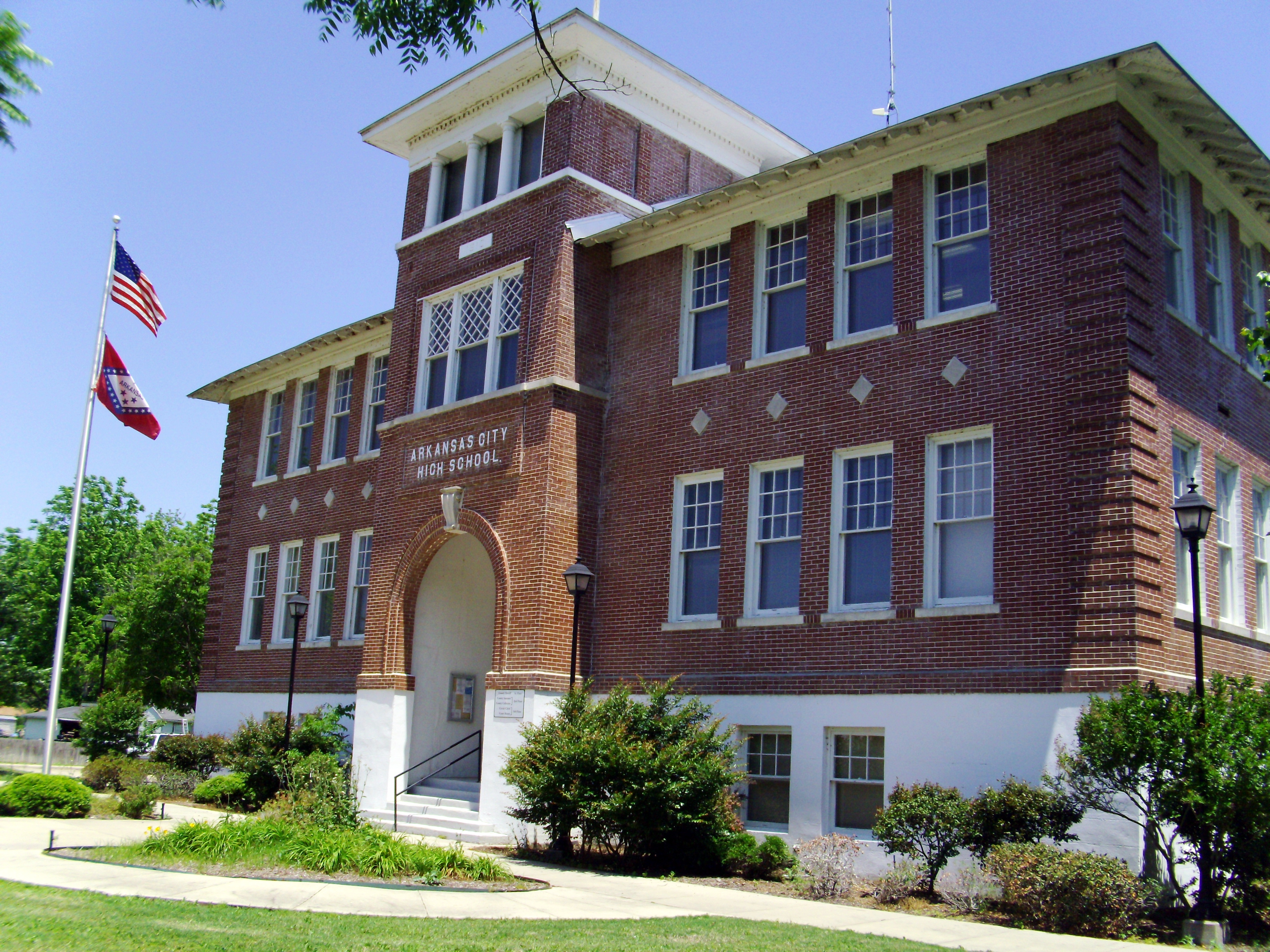
Arkansas City High School (pre-1983 building)

Arkansas City is served by the McGehee School District.

Previously the Arkansas City School District served Arkansas City. The district had two schools, Arkansas City Elementary School and Arkansas City High School. In 2004 the Arkansas Legislature approved a law that forced school districts with fewer than 350 students apiece to consolidate with other districts. On July 1, 2004, the Arkansas City district merged into the McGehee district. After the acquisition, the McGehee district continued to operate the Arkansas City campus as a K–6 school. By October 2005, the district no longer operated the Arkansas City facility.

== Notable people ==
- John H. Johnson, founder of an international media and cosmetics empire that includes Ebony and Jet
- Robert S. Moore Jr., farmer and politician, served in the Arkansas House of Representatives from 2007–2013
- Henry Thane, businessman and politician, served in the Arkansas Senate (1883–1887)
