= Faust House =

Faust House may refer to:

== Czech Republic ==
- Faust House (Prague), a historic building in Prague

== United States ==
Alphabetical by state, then town

- Faust House (Helena-West Helena, Arkansas), listed on the National Register of Historic Places (NRHP)
- Gemmill-Faust House, West Helena, Arkansas, NRHP-listed
- Thomas Faust House, NRHP-listed in Homestead, Florida
- Faust Houses and Outbuildings, NRHP-listed in Oglethorpe County, Georgia
- Faust-Ryan House, NRHP-listed in King County, Washington

== See also ==
- Hotel Faust, New Braunfels, Texas, US
