= E. S. Ready House =

Historic house in Arkansas, United States

- U.S. National Register of Historic Places
- U.S. Historic district – Contributing property
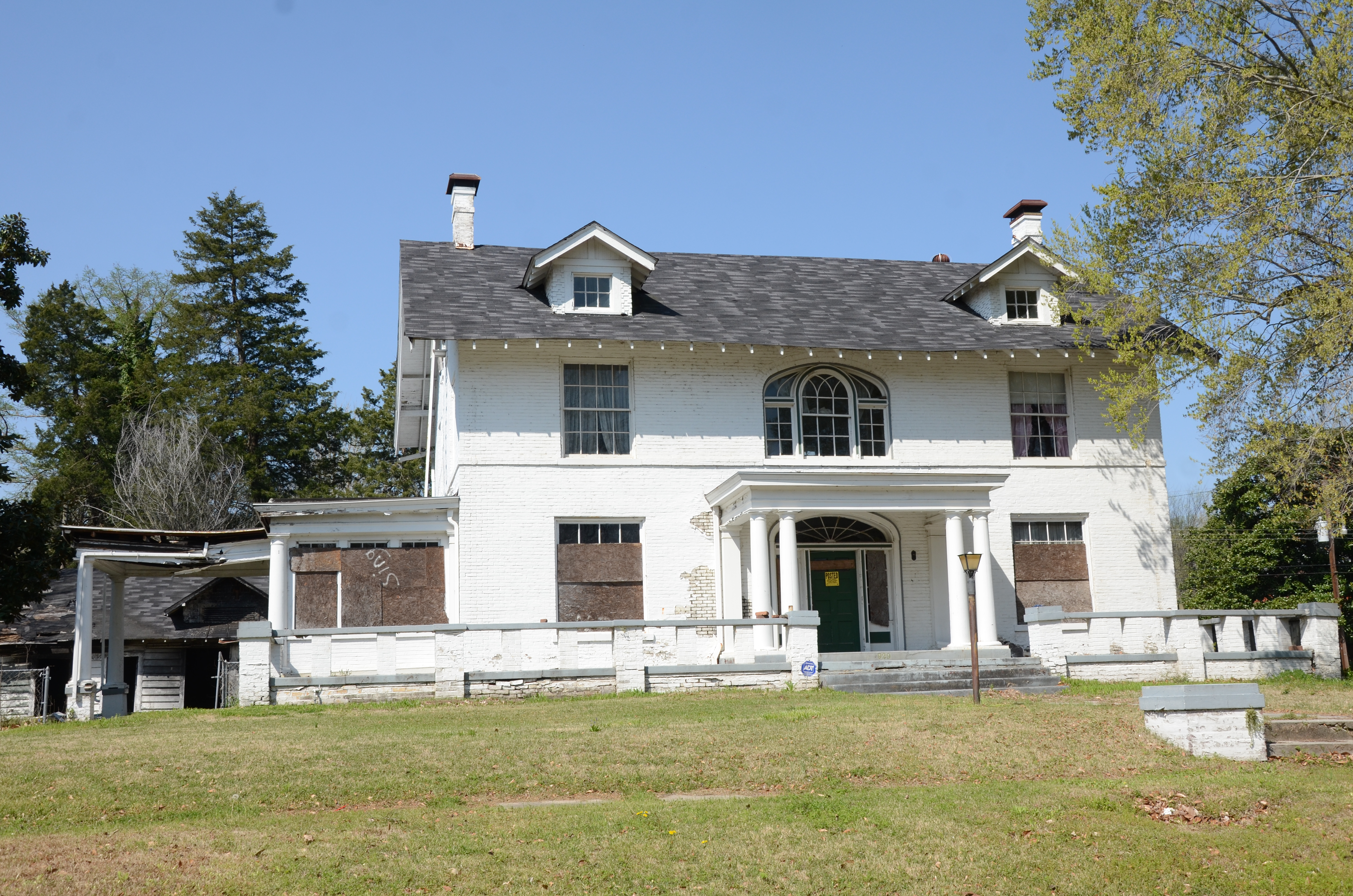

- Location within Arkansas Location within the United States
- Location: 929 Beech Street, Helena, Arkansas
- Coordinates: 34°31′55″N 90°35′33″W
- Area: less than one acre
- Built: 1910
- Architect: Charles L. Thompson
- Part of: Beech Street Historic District (ID86003314)
- NRHP reference No.: 76000445

Significant dates
- Added to NRHP: January 1, 1976
- Designated CP: January 30, 1987

The E. S. Ready House, now currently known as the Ready-Moneymaker House, is a historic house at 929 Beech Street in Helena, Arkansas. It is a 2 1/2-story brick structure, designed by Charles L. Thompson and built in 1910 for E. S. Ready, a prominent Helena businessman. It is the only known Thompson design in Helena. The main facade is three bays wide, with a central entry sheltered by a single-story portico, which is supported by paired Doric columns and topped by a balcony with a low balustrade. Both the main entry and the balcony door are flanked by sidelight windows, and the main entry is topped by a fanlight window.

The house was listed on the National Register of Historic Places in 1976.

== See also ==
- National Register of Historic Places listings in Phillips County, Arkansas
