= Myers House (Helena-West Helena, Arkansas) =

Historic house in Arkansas, United States

- U.S. National Register of Historic Places
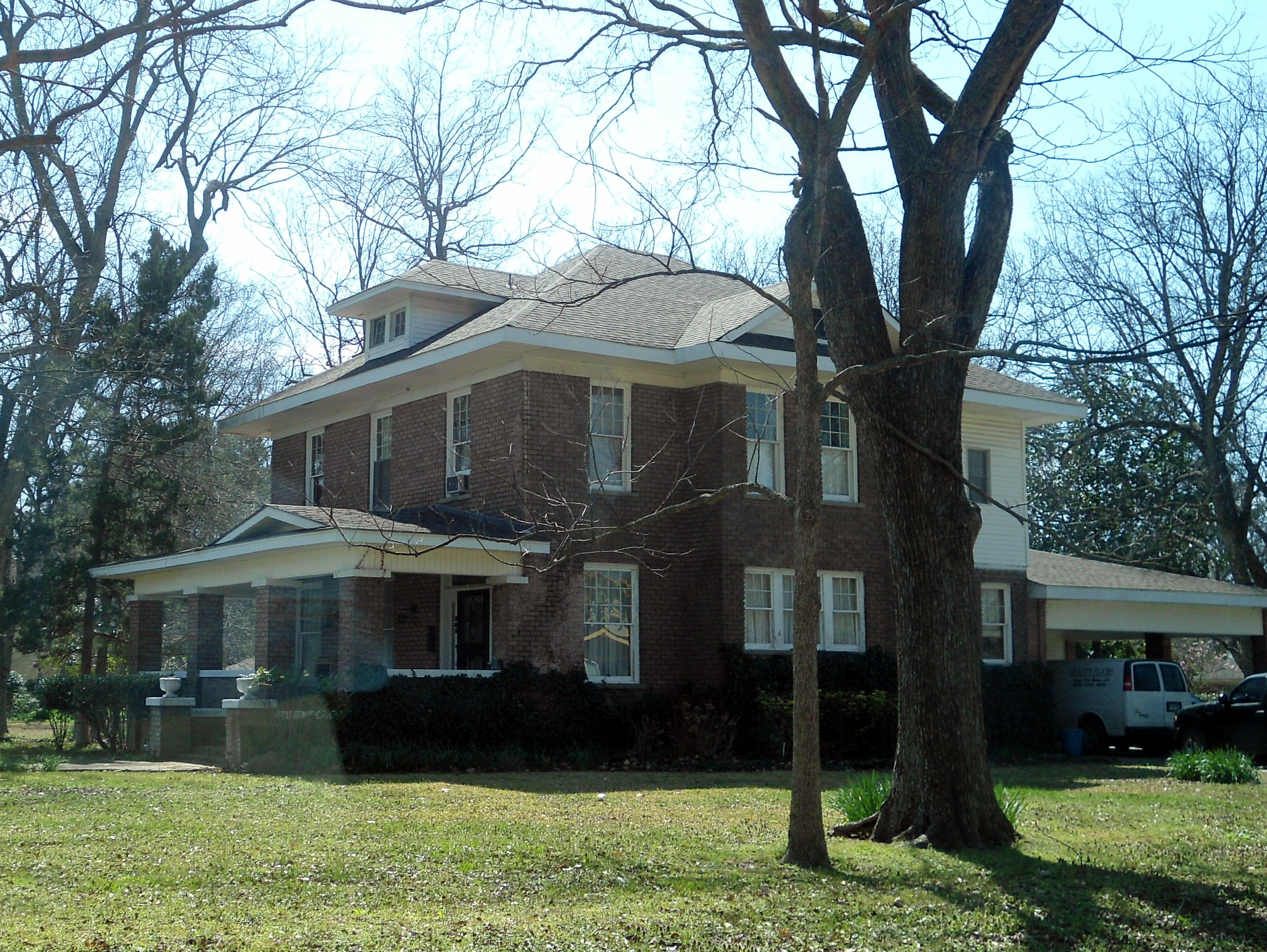

- Location within Arkansas Location within the United States
- Location: 221 St. Andrew's Terrace, West Helena, Arkansas
- Coordinates: 34°32′27″N 90°38′0″W
- Area: less than one acre
- Built: 1920
- Architectural style: Prairie School, Bungalow/craftsman
- MPS: West Helena MPS
- NRHP reference No.: 96001136
- Added to NRHP: October 31, 1996

The Myers House is a historic house at 221 St. Andrew's Terrace in West Helena, Arkansas. It is a two-story wood frame and brick house with a hip roof pierced on three sides by broad hip-roof dormers. Built c. 1920, it represents an excellent local synthesis of Craftsman and Prairie School styling.

The house was listed on the National Register of Historic Places in 1996.

== See also ==
- National Register of Historic Places listings in Phillips County, Arkansas
