= Coolidge House (Helena-West Helena, Arkansas) =

Historic house in Arkansas, United States

- U.S. National Register of Historic Places
- U.S. Historic district – Contributing property
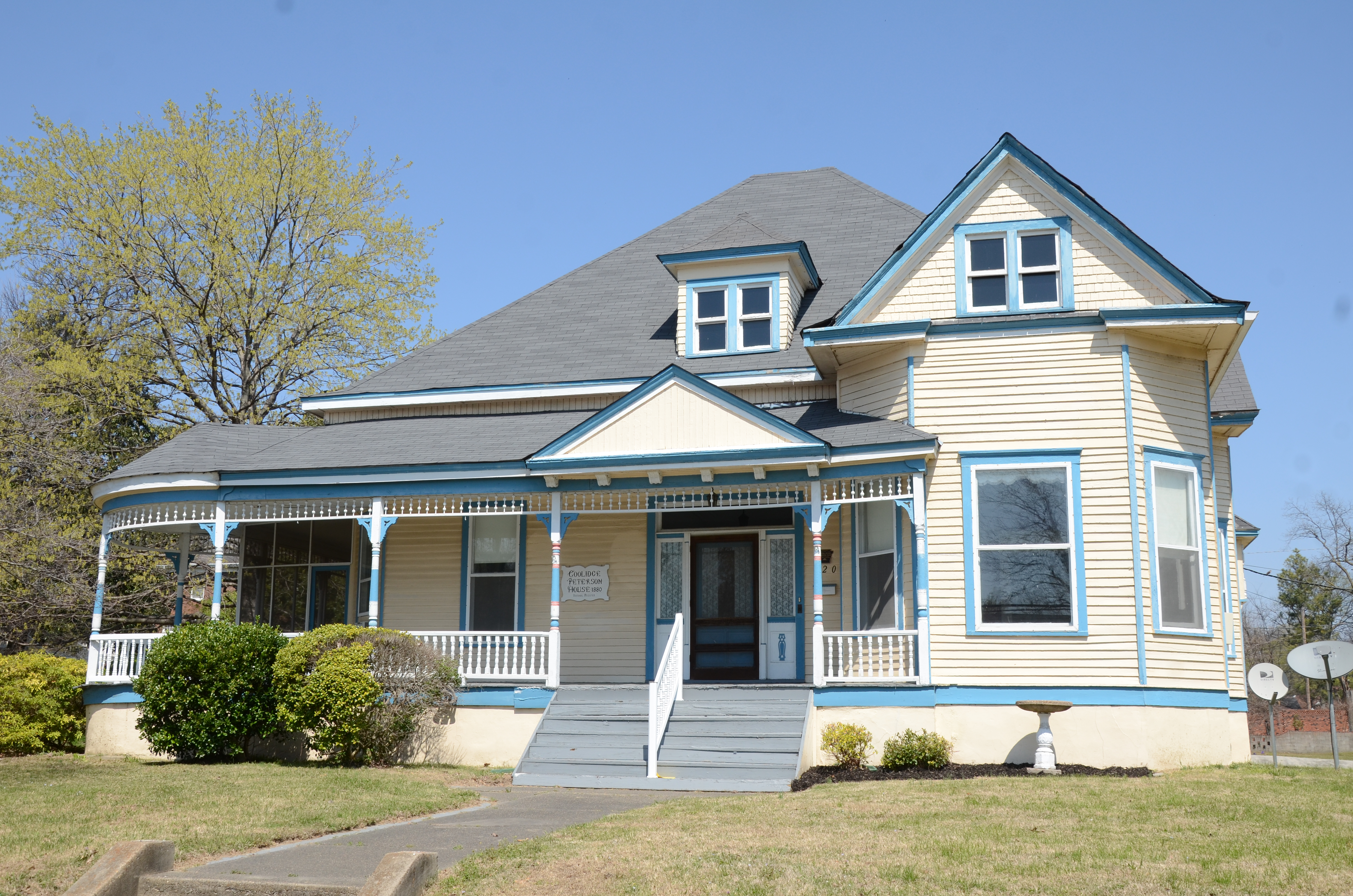

- Location within Arkansas Location within the United States
- Location: 820 Perry St., Helena, Arkansas
- Coordinates: 34°31′46″N 90°35′36″W
- Area: less than one acre
- Built: 1880
- Architectural style: Queen Anne
- Part of: Beech Street Historic District (ID86003314)
- NRHP reference No.: 83001161

Significant dates
- Added to NRHP: September 8, 1983
- Designated CP: January 30, 1987

The Coolidge House is a historic house at 820 Perry Street in Helena, Arkansas. It is a 1 1/2-story wood-frame structure, built in 1880 by S. C. Moore as a wedding present for his daughter, Anna Leslie Moore, and Charles Coolidge, Jr. It is an excellent local example of Queen Anne styling, with numerous gables projecting from its steeply hipped and busy roof line. The porch extends partly across the front (south) before wrapping around to the west; it has sawn brackets and a spindled frieze, with a pedimented gable above the stairs.

The house was listed on the National Register of Historic Places in 1983.

== See also ==
- National Register of Historic Places listings in Phillips County, Arkansas
