= Nelson House (Helena-West Helena, Arkansas) =

Historic house in Arkansas, United States

- U.S. National Register of Historic Places
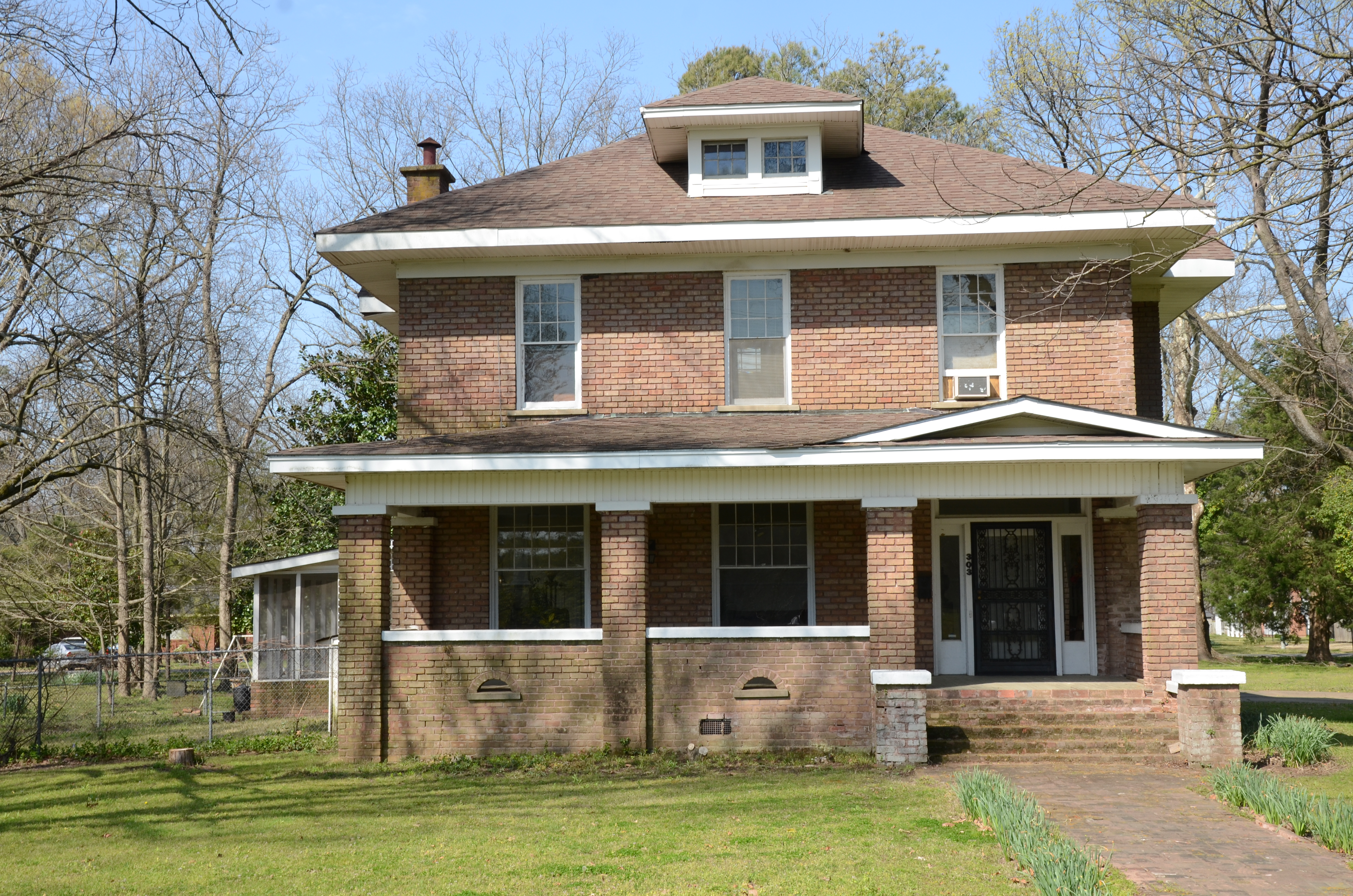

- Location within Arkansas Location within the United States
- Location: 303 St. Andrew's Terrace, West Helena, Arkansas
- Coordinates: 34°32′22″N 90°38′0″W
- Area: less than one acre
- Built: 1915
- Architectural style: American Four Square
- MPS: West Helena MPS
- NRHP reference No.: 96001135
- Added to NRHP: October 31, 1996

The Nelson House is a historic house at 303 St. Andrew's Terrace in West Helena, Arkansas. It is a 2 1/2-story wood-frame and brick structure, with a full-width front porch, and a rear single-story ell. The house has modest Colonial Revival styling, but is fundamentally an excellent local example of the American Foursquare architectural style. It was built c. 1915, and is one of a modest number of homes from that period to survive in West Helena.

The house was listed on the National Register of Historic Places in 1996.

== See also ==
- National Register of Historic Places listings in Phillips County, Arkansas
