= Maj. James Alexander Tappan House =

Historic house in Arkansas, United States

- U.S. National Register of Historic Places
- U.S. Historic district – Contributing property
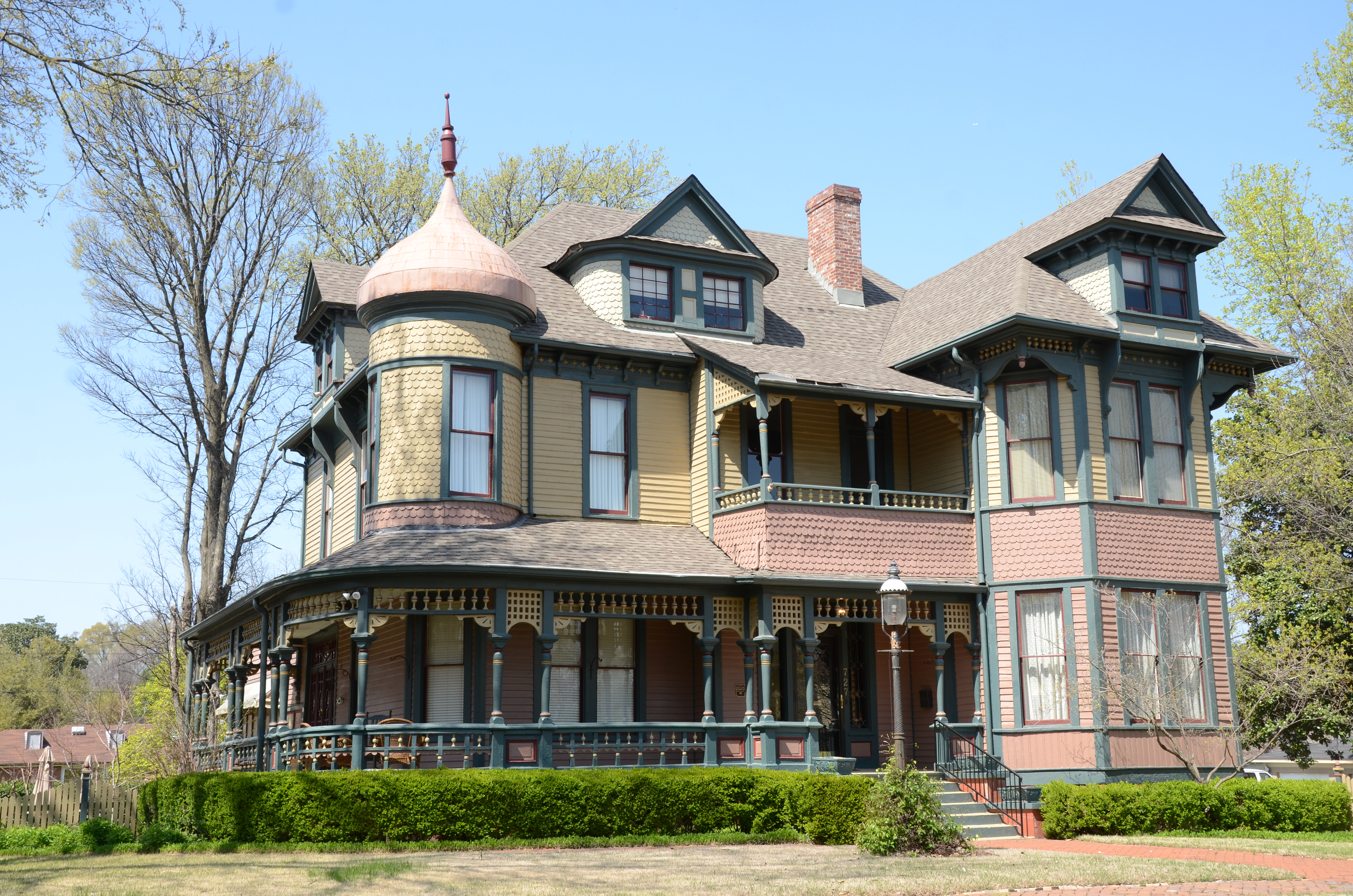

- Location within Arkansas Location within the United States
- Location: 727 Columbia St., Helena, Arkansas
- Coordinates: 34°31′59″N 90°35′28″W
- Area: less than one acre
- Built: 1892
- Built by: Lyle Bros.
- Architectural style: Queen Anne
- Part of: Beech Street Historic District (ID86003314)
- NRHP reference No.: 74000493

Significant dates
- Added to NRHP: September 9, 1974
- Designated CP: January 30, 1987

The Maj. James Alexander Tappan House is a historic house at 727 Columbia Street in Helena, Arkansas. It is a 2 1/2-story wood-frame structure, built in 1892 for James Tappan, a wealthy businessman from a prominent local family. The house is a fine Queen Anne Victorian, with a particularly elaborate porch with a spindled balustrade and delicately proportioned columns, which wraps around a turreted projection with a conical roof. The cornice is decorated with brackets and panels, and the exterior also features the use of decoratively-cut shingles. James Tappan operated a number of businesses, including coal supply and a hardware store, and was director of a local bank.

The house was listed on the National Register of Historic Places in 1974.

== See also ==
- National Register of Historic Places listings in Phillips County, Arkansas
