= Almer Store =

- U.S. National Register of Historic Places
- U.S. Historic district – Contributing property
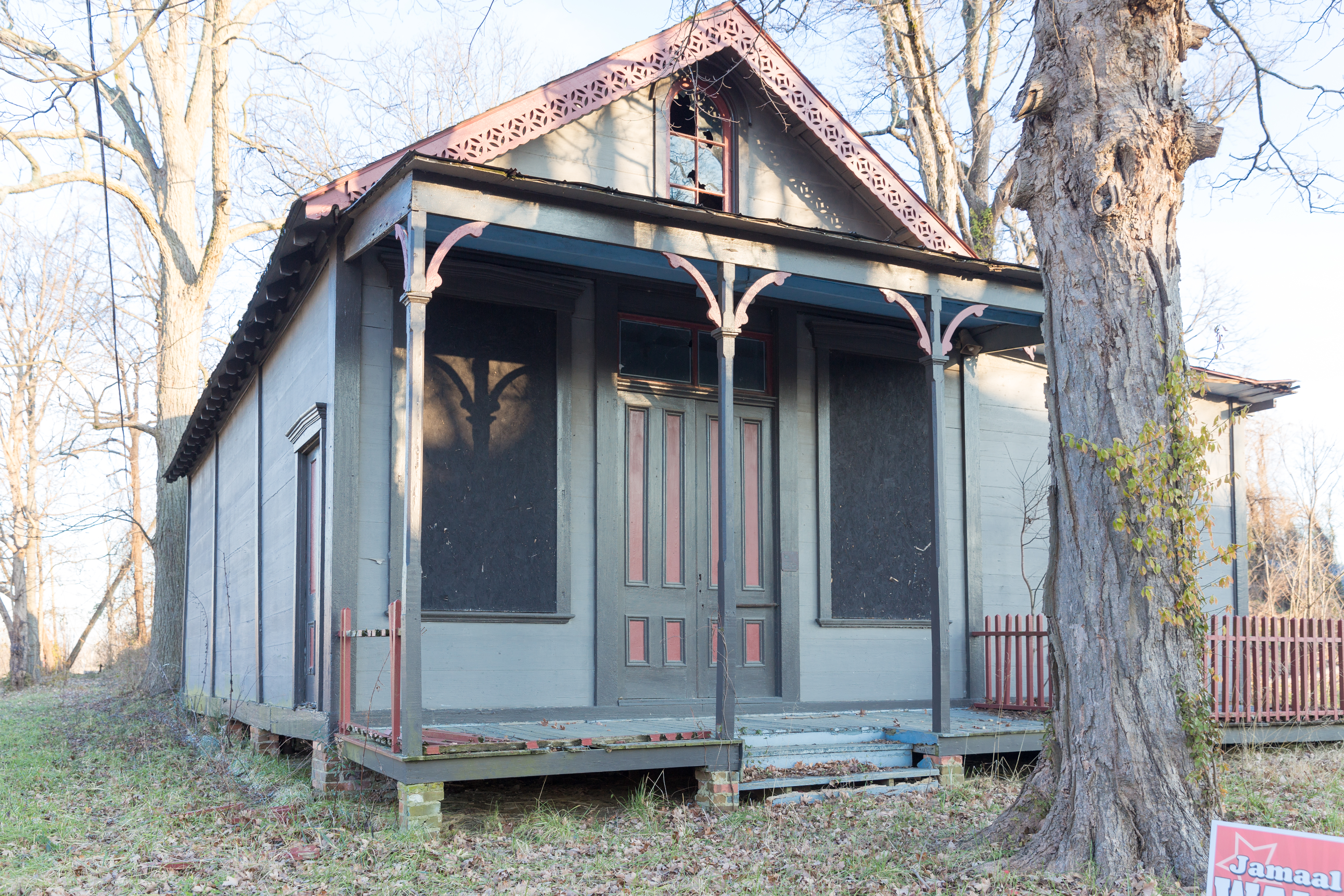

- Location within Arkansas Location within the United States
- Location: 824 Columbia St., Helena, Arkansas
- Coordinates: 34°31′42″N 90°35′20″W
- Area: less than one acre
- Built: 1875
- Built by: Almer, Ulrich
- Part of: Beech Street Historic District (ID86003314)
- NRHP reference No.: 74000488

Significant dates
- Added to NRHP: October 18, 1974
- Designated CP: January 30, 1987

The Almer Store is a historic commercial building at 824 Columbia Street in Helena, Arkansas. Built sometime in the 1870s by Swiss immigrants, it is one of the oldest commercial buildings in Phillips County. Ulrich Almer is claimed to have built the store out of the parts of a raft he and his wife floated down the Mississippi River. The Almers were dairy farmers, who sold their milk products from the building, which later became more of a neighborhood market. It was in danger of demolition in the early 1970s when it was acquired by the Phillips County Historical Society and restored.

The building was listed on the National Register of Historic Places in 1974.

== See also ==
- National Register of Historic Places listings in Phillips County, Arkansas
