= Denison House =

Denison House may refer to:

- Consulate General of China, Manchester, a Grade II listed building called Denison House
- Denison House (Helena-West Helena, Arkansas), listed on the NRHP in Arkansas
- Denison House (Boston), Massachusetts, a College Settlements Association settlement house co-founded by Vida Dutton Scudder
- William Denison House, Adamsville, OH, listed on the NRHP in Ohio
- Denison House (Forty Fort, Pennsylvania), listed on the NRHP in Pennsylvania
