= Chicago Mill Company Office Building =

Historic in West Helena, Arkansas, US

- U.S. National Register of Historic Places
- Location within Arkansas Location within the United States
- Location: 129 N. Washington St., West Helena, Arkansas
- Coordinates: 34°32′39″N 90°39′22″W
- Area: less than one acre
- Built: 1920
- Architectural style: Bungalow/craftsman
- MPS: West Helena MPS
- NRHP reference No.: 96001133
- Added to NRHP: October 31, 1996

The Chicago Mill Company Office Building is a historic commercial building at 129 North Washington Street in West Helena, Arkansas. It is a single-story wood-frame structure, whose Craftsman styling includes broad eaves and a wraparound porch supported by square columns. Built c. 1920, it housed the local offices of the Chicago Mill Company, one of the largest lumber concerns to operate in West Helena when that business was booming in the 1920s and 1930s. It is one of the few commercial buildings in West Helena to survive from that time.

The building was listed on the National Register of Historic Places in 1996.

== See also ==
- National Register of Historic Places listings in Phillips County, Arkansas
