= West House (Helena-West Helena, Arkansas) =

Historic house in Arkansas, United States

- U.S. National Register of Historic Places
- U.S. Historic district – Contributing property
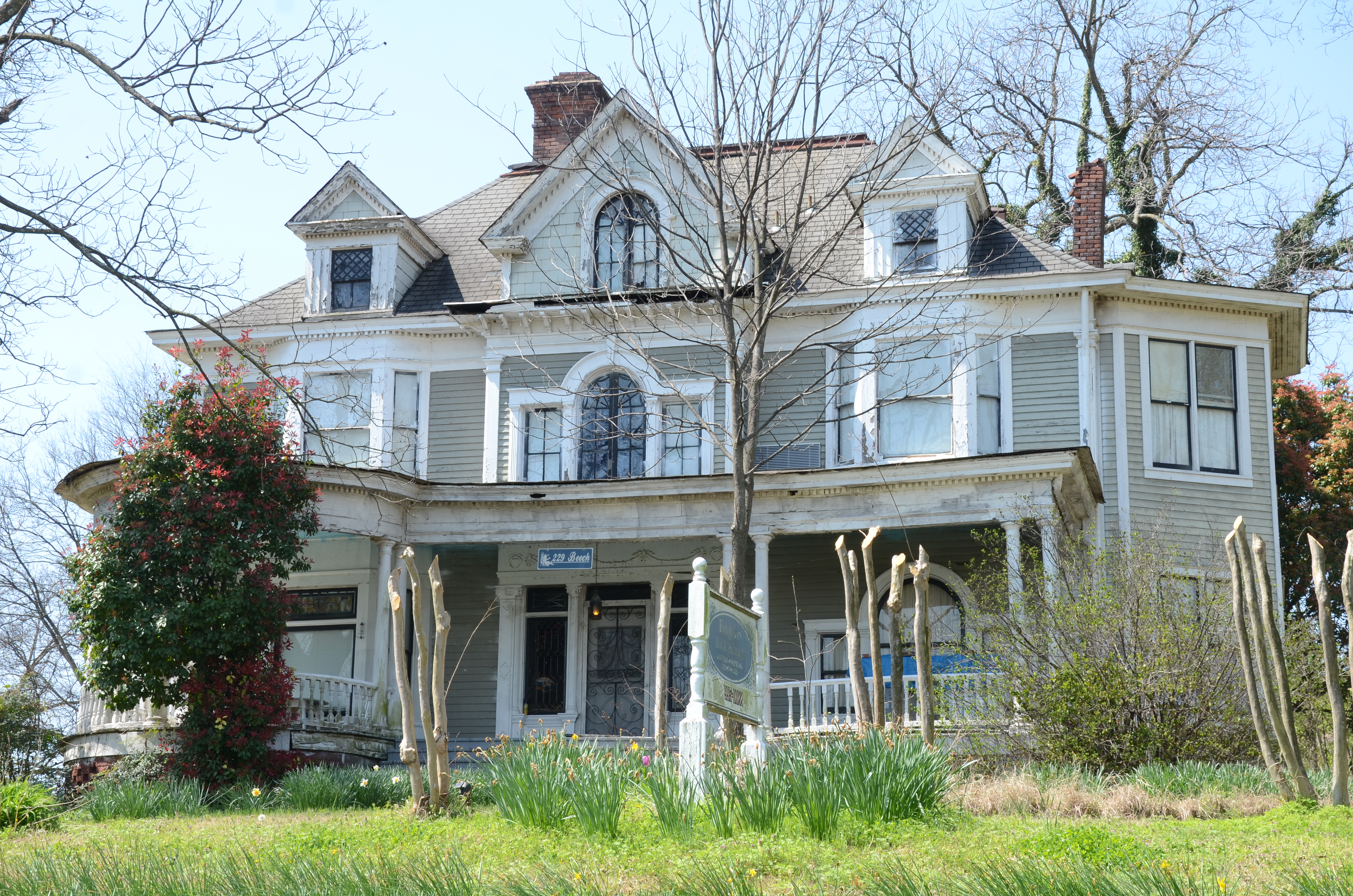

- Location within Arkansas Location within the United States
- Location: 229 Beech St., Helena-West Helena, Arkansas
- Coordinates: 34°31′39″N 90°35′33″W
- Area: less than one acre
- Built: 1900
- Architect: Clem Brothers Builders of St. Louis
- Architectural style: Colonial Revival
- Part of: Beech Street Historic District (ID86003314)
- NRHP reference No.: 83001163

Significant dates
- Added to NRHP: September 8, 1983
- Designated CP: January 30, 1987

The West House is a historic house at 229 Beech Street in Helena-West Helena, Arkansas. It is a 2 1/2-story wood-frame structure, built in 1900 for Mercer Elmer West by the Clem Brothers of St. Louis. The house exhibits stylistic elements of both the Colonial Revival, which was growing in popularity, and Queen Anne, which was in decline. It has a wide porch supported by Ionic columns, with a spindled balustrade. The house's corners are quoined. The main entry is flanked by slender columns supporting an architrave, and then by sidelight windows topped by a transom window. A Palladian window stands to the right of the door, and a bay window with a center transom of colored glass stands to the left.

The house was listed on the National Register of Historic Places in 1983.

== See also ==
- National Register of Historic Places listings in Phillips County, Arkansas
