= Faust House (Helena-West Helena, Arkansas) =

Historic house in Arkansas, United States

- U.S. National Register of Historic Places
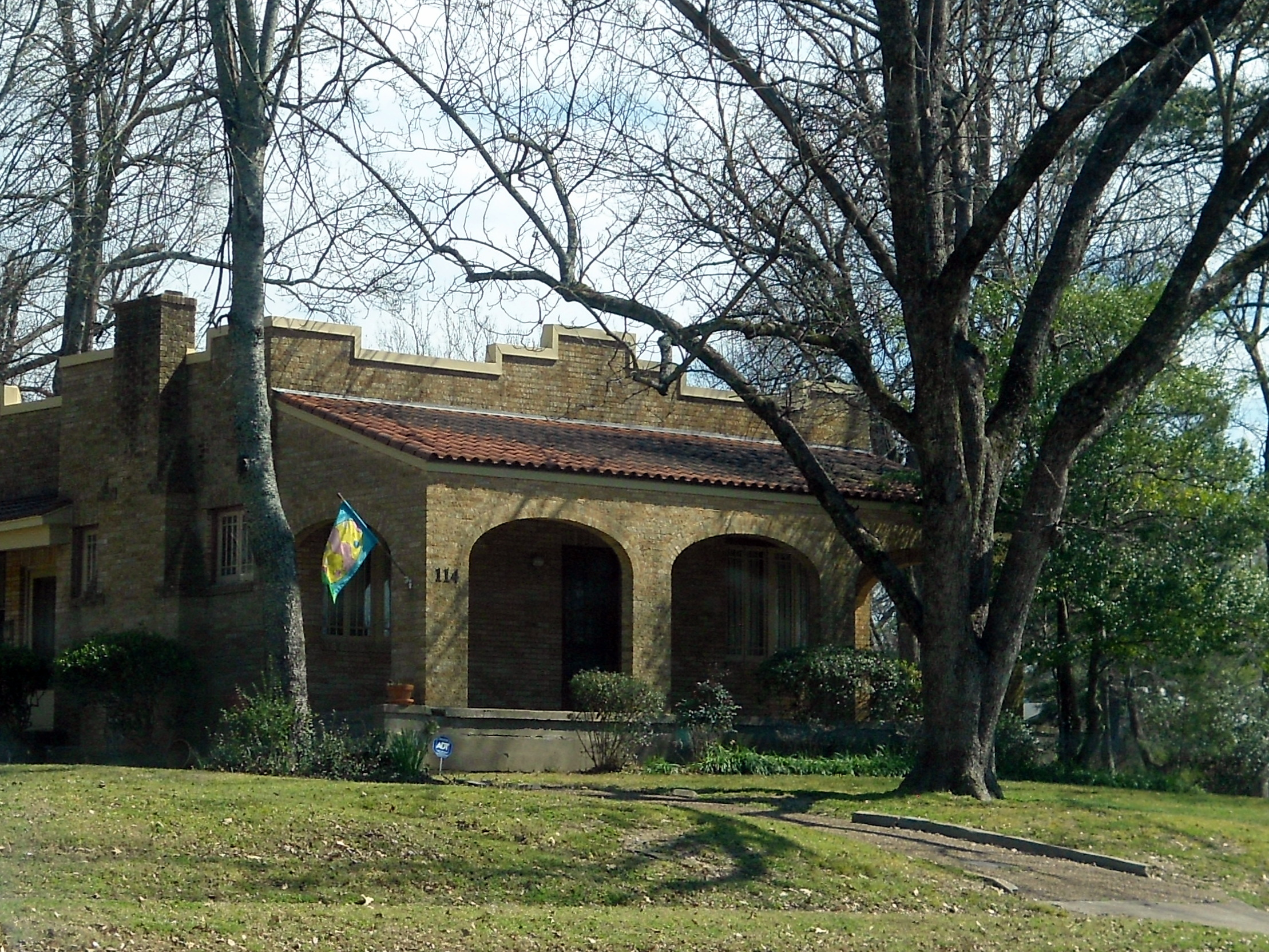

- Location within Arkansas Location within the United States
- Location: 114 Richmond Hill, West Helena, Arkansas
- Coordinates: 34°32′36″N 90°38′2″W
- Area: less than one acre
- Built: 1924
- Architectural style: Mission/spanish Revival
- MPS: West Helena MPS
- NRHP reference No.: 96001130
- Added to NRHP: October 31, 1996

The Faust House is a historic house at 114 Richmond Hill in West Helena, Arkansas. It is a single-story wood-frame structure, finished in brick. It has porch extending across its entire front facade, supported by brick columns and spandrels, and topped by a ceramic tile roof. The house is locally significant as one of the finest Spanish Mission style houses in West Helena.

The house was listed on the National Register of Historic Places in 1996.

== See also ==
- National Register of Historic Places listings in Phillips County, Arkansas
