= Helena National Guard Armory =

- U.S. National Register of Historic Places
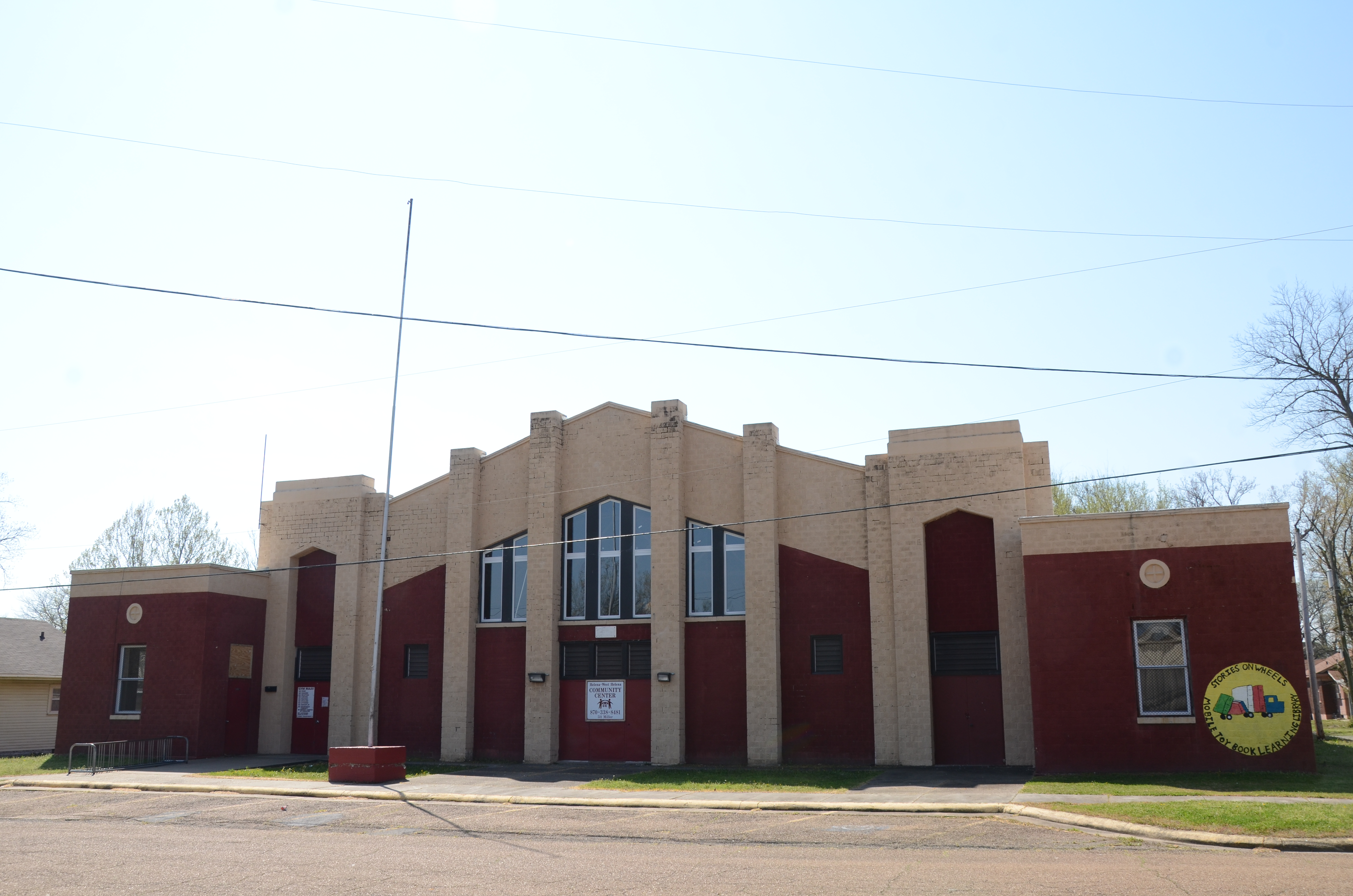

- Location within Arkansas Location within the United States
- Location: 511 Miller St., Helena-West Helena, Arkansas
- Coordinates: 34°31′53″N 90°35′19″W
- Area: less than one acre
- Built: 1937
- Built by: Works Progress Administration
- Architectural style: Art Deco
- MPS: New Deal Recovery Efforts in Arkansas MPS
- NRHP reference No.: 06001266
- Added to NRHP: January 24, 2007

The Helena National Guard Armory is a historic armory building at 511 Miller Street in Helena, Arkansas. It is a single-story brick-and-masonry structure, built in 1936–37 using Works Progress Administration funds to house the Battery G of the 206th Coastal Artillery. The building's main facade as strong Art Deco styling, with its predominantly brick facing topped by concrete courses, and a strong vertical emphasis achieved by two towers and four pilasters on a pointed-arch roofline. The building housed a variety of military companies between its opening and its closure in 1978.

The building was listed on the National Register of Historic Places in 2007. It now serves as a community center.

== See also ==
- National Register of Historic Places listings in Phillips County, Arkansas
