= New Light Missionary Baptist Church =

Historic church in Arkansas, United States

- Formerly listed on the U.S. National Register of Historic Places
- Location within Arkansas Location within the United States
- Location: 522 Arkansas St., Helena, Arkansas
- Coordinates: 34°31′18″N 90°35′25″W
- Area: less than one acre
- Built: 1917
- Architectural style: Late Gothic Revival
- MPS: Ethnic and Racial Minority Settlement of the Arkansas Delta MPS
- NRHP reference No.: 95001410

Significant dates
- Added to NRHP: December 7, 1995
- Removed from NRHP: January 26, 2018

The New Light Missionary Baptist Church was a historic church at 522 Arkansas Street in Helena, Arkansas. It was a two-story wood-frame brick and masonry structure, built in 1917 for an African-American congregation organized in 1894. Its Gothic Revival design bore some resemblance to Helena's Centennial Baptist Church (a National Historic Landmark), but this building's architect is not known. Its main facade had a single tall gable, with a three-story tower at the southwest corner. A pair of entrances on the first level were topped by three lancet-style windows in the gable, the center one larger than those flanking it. The interior was simply decorated.

The building was listed on the National Register of Historic Places in 1995. It was subsequently demolished, and was delisted in 2018.

== See also ==
- National Register of Historic Places listings in Phillips County, Arkansas
