= Henry and Cornelia Ford Farm =

- U.S. National Register of Historic Places
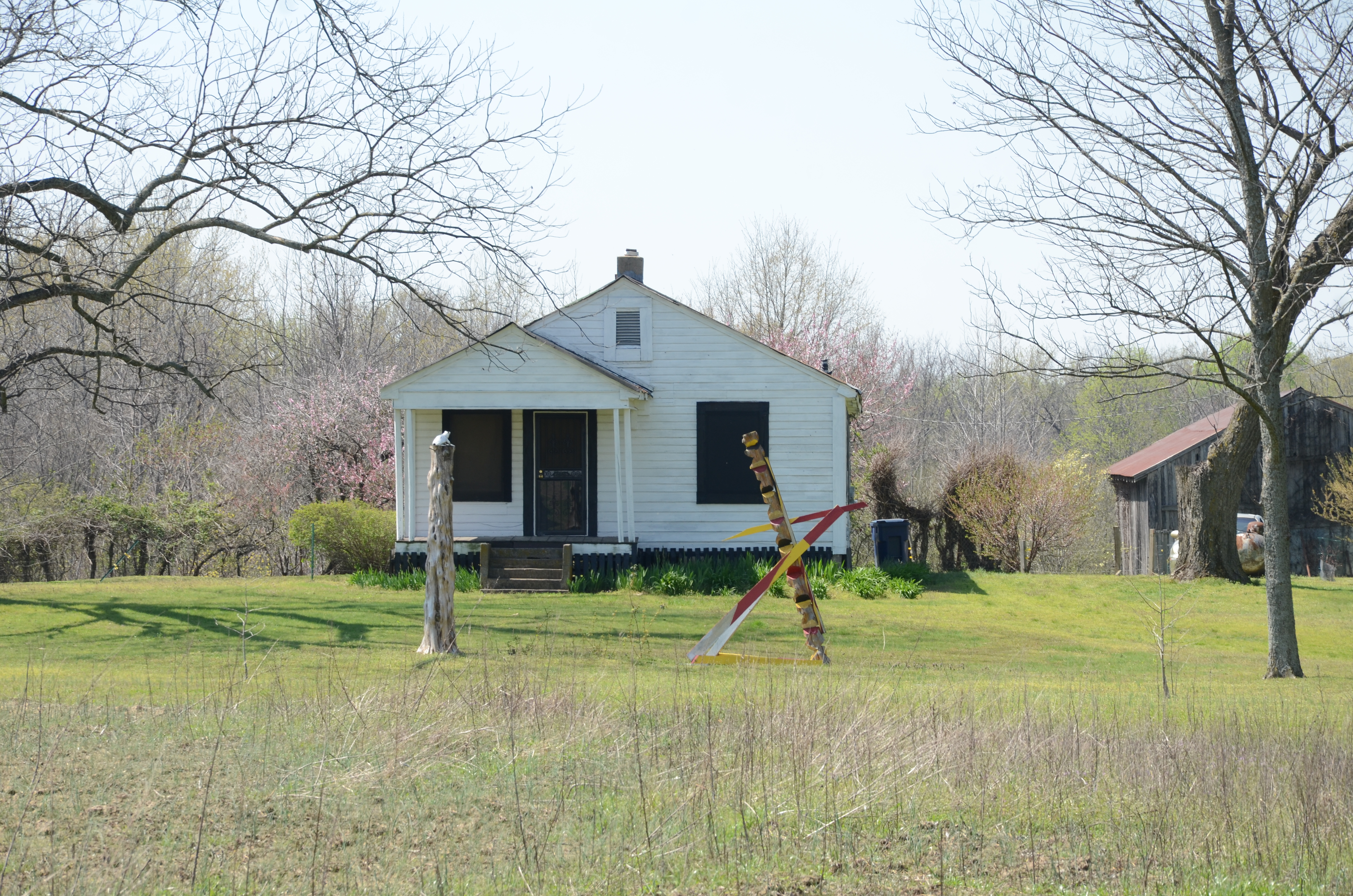

- Location within Arkansas Location within the United States
- Nearest city: Lexa, Arkansas
- Coordinates: 34°37′12″N 90°42′28″W
- Area: 5.3 acres (2.1 ha)
- Built: 1950
- Architectural style: plain traditional
- MPS: Cotton and Rice Farm History and Architecture in the Arkansas Delta MPS
- NRHP reference No.: 06000085
- Added to NRHP: March 2, 2006

The Henry and Cornelia Ford Farm is a historic farmstead in rural Phillips County, Arkansas. It is at 1335 County Road 249, northeast of Lexa. The farmstead consists of four buildings on 5.25 acres (2.12 ha) of land, including a row of pecan trees lining the farm's main drive. The main house is an architecturally undistinguished vernacular structure with a porch extending across its main facade. The barn, northwest of the house, is finished in board-and-batten siding. Also on the property area shed and an artist's studio. The farmstead was built c. 1950, in part with assistance from the Federal Housing Administration, which had previously visited the Ford's farm to see how the African-American couple had established a financially self-sufficient operation. It is a well-preserved and maintained example of a small mid-20th-century farmstead.

The farm was listed on the National Register of Historic Places in 2006.

== See also ==
- National Register of Historic Places listings in Phillips County, Arkansas
