= Gemmill-Faust House =

Historic house in Arkansas, United States

- U.S. National Register of Historic Places
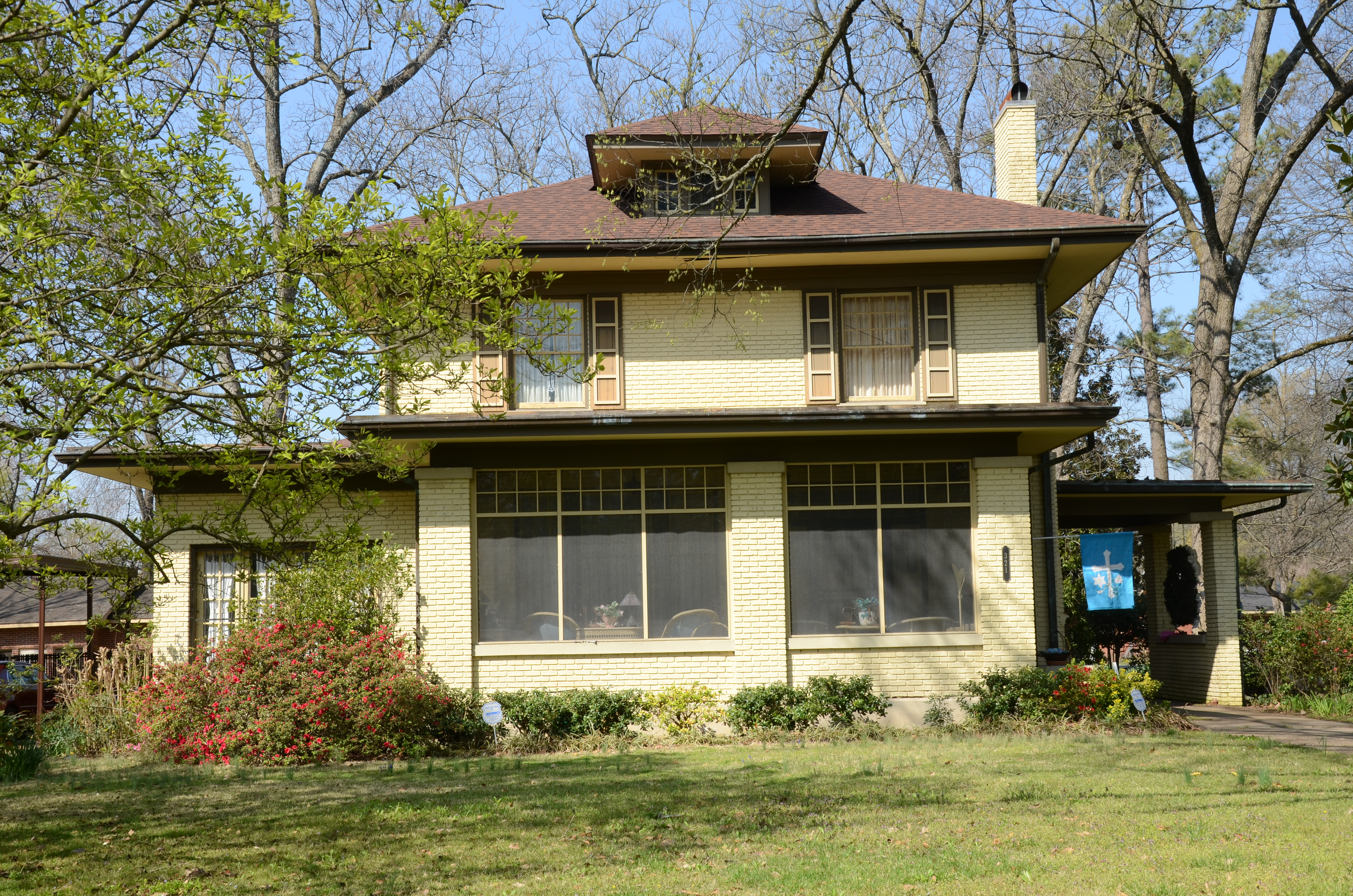

- Location within Arkansas Location within the United States
- Location: 321 St. Andrew's Terrace, West Helena, Arkansas
- Coordinates: 34°32′20″N 90°38′1″W
- Area: 1.5 acres (0.61 ha)
- Built: 1920
- Architectural style: Prairie School
- MPS: West Helena MPS
- NRHP reference No.: 96001134
- Added to NRHP: October 31, 1996

The Gemmill-Faust House is a historic house at 321 St. Andrew's Terrace in West Helena, Arkansas. It is a two-story wood-frame structure with a brick-face exterior, built c. 1920. The house is an excellent local example of the Prairie School of design, with its broad spreading eaves, hip roof with hipped dormer, light-colored brick, and ribbon windows throughout. A period garage stands west of (behind) the main house.

The house was listed on the National Register of Historic Places in 1996.

== See also ==
- National Register of Historic Places listings in Phillips County, Arkansas
