= William A. Short House =

Historic house in Arkansas, United States

- U.S. National Register of Historic Places
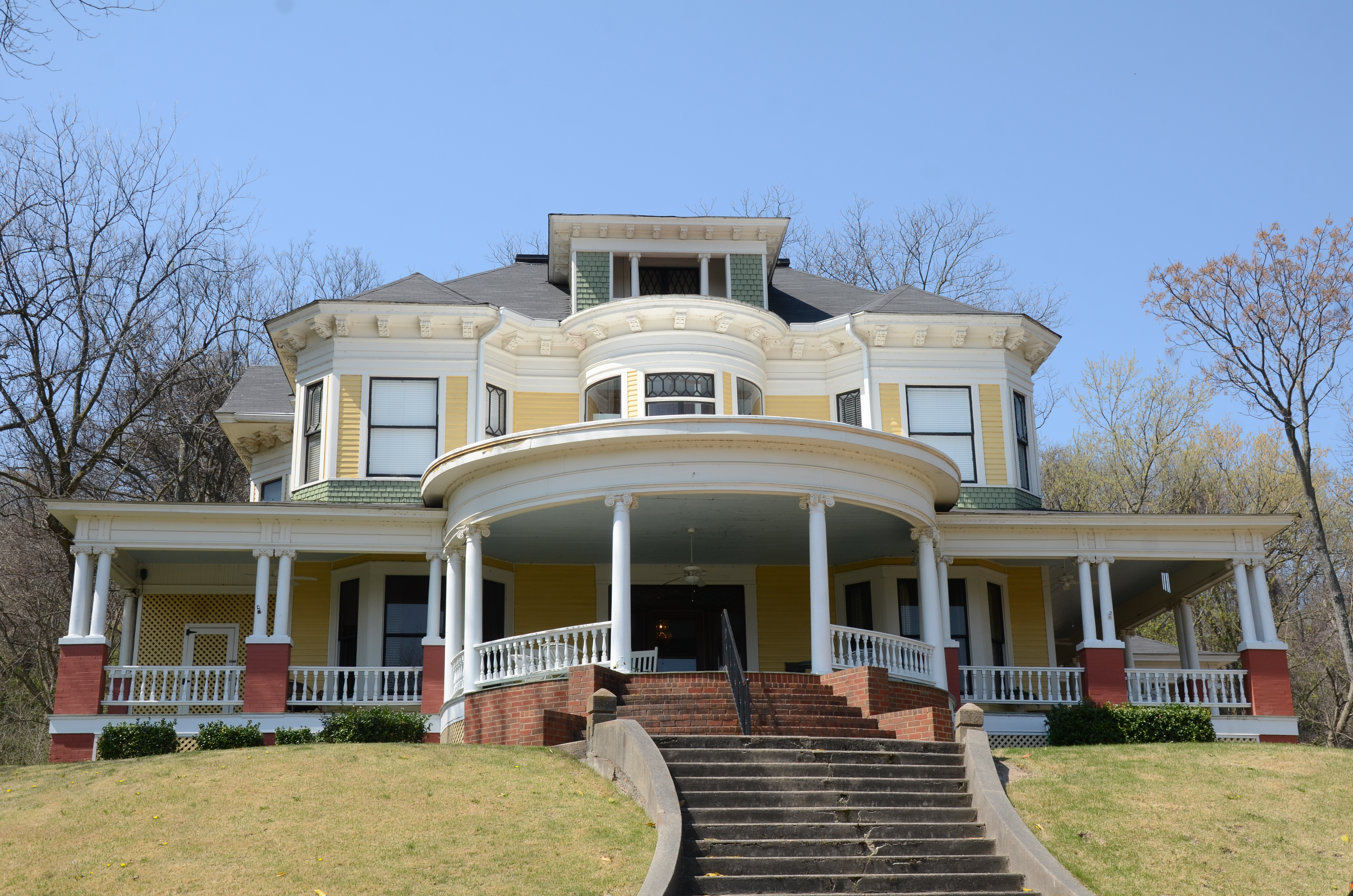

- Location within Arkansas Location within the United States
- Location: 317 Biscoe St., Helena, Arkansas
- Coordinates: 34°31′5″N 90°35′31″W
- Area: less than one acre
- Built: 1904
- Architect: Clem Brothers
- Architectural style: Colonial Revival
- NRHP reference No.: 85000833
- Added to NRHP: April 18, 1985

The William A. Short House is a historic house at 317 Biscoe Street in Helena, Arkansas. It is a 2 1/2-story wood-frame structure, built in 1904 for William A. and Sally Baker Short. Short was a cotton merchant with offices throughout the region, but lost much of his fortune when the cotton market collapsed and was forced to sell the house in 1917. The house has elaborate Colonial Revival styling, most prominent on the exterior in the semicircular porch extending across its front. Detailed woodwork in a variety of woods is found inside.

The house was listed on the National Register of Historic Places in 1985. It is now the Edwardian Inn, a bed and breakfast accommodation.

== See also ==
- National Register of Historic Places listings in Phillips County, Arkansas
