= Lakeview Resettlement Project Historic District =

Historic district in Arkansas, United States

- U.S. National Register of Historic Places
- U.S. Historic district
- Location within Arkansas Location within the United States
- Location: Near the jct. of AR 85 & AR 44, Lake View, Arkansas
- Coordinates: 34°25′0″N 90°47′11″W
- Area: 4,371 acres (1,769 ha)
- NRHP reference No.: 100003357
- Added to NRHP: January 28, 2019

The Lakeview Resettlement Project Historic District encompasses a significant portion of a Depression-era agricultural resettlement project of the United States federal government in and around Lake View, Arkansas. Covering nearly 4,400 acres (1,800 ha) on either side of Arkansas Highway 84 north of Old Town Lake, the area was developed in the 1930s by the Resettlement Administration as a rural community specifically developed for African-Americans. Roads and houses were built through the area, and a successful farming community eventually arose.

The district was listed on the National Register of Historic Places in 2019.

== See also ==
- National Register of Historic Places listings in Phillips County, Arkansas
