= Phillips County Penal Farm Historic District =

Historic district in Arkansas, United States

- U.S. National Register of Historic Places
- U.S. Historic district
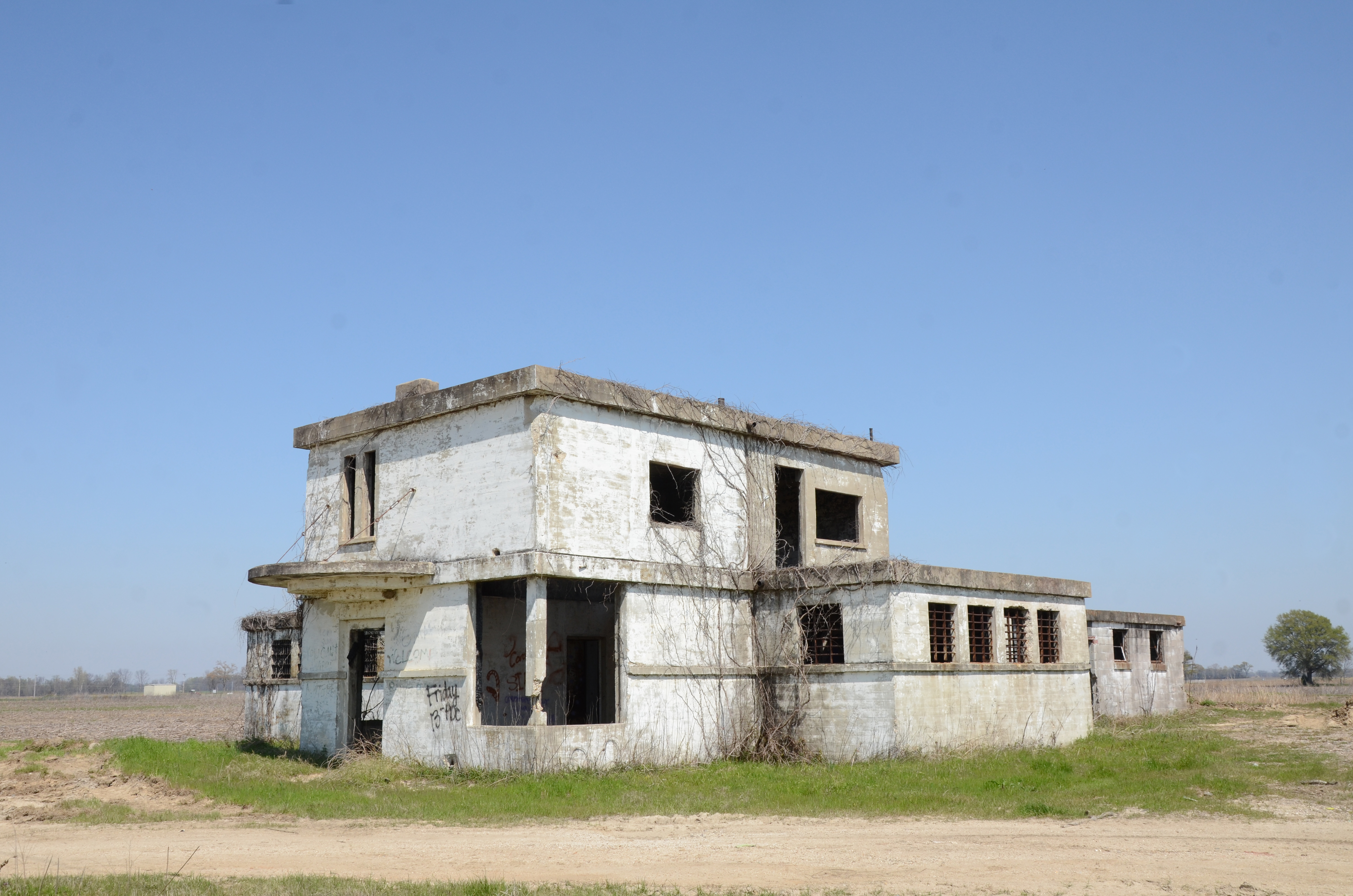

- Location within Arkansas Location within the United States
- Nearest city: Poplar Grove, Arkansas
- Coordinates: 34°33′6″N 90°48′11″W
- Area: less than one acre
- Built: 1937
- Built by: Works Progress Administration
- Architectural style: International Style
- MPS: New Deal Recovery Efforts in Arkansas MPS
- NRHP reference No.: 06001268
- Added to NRHP: January 24, 2007

The Phillips County Penal Farm Historic District encompasses a former prison facility in Phillips County, Arkansas. It is located on the east side of County Road 353, south of United States Route 49, about halfway between Helena-West Helena and Marvell. The complex consists of three concrete structures, a water tower, and a concrete foundation pad. The main building is a cast concrete structure, two stories in height, with Plain Tradition and International styling, while the other two buildings are single-story concrete block structures. These, and the water tower, were built c. 1935–37 with funding from the Works Progress Administration, and served as a penal facility until 1973. The property is now vacant and abandoned.

The complex was listed on the National Register of Historic Places in 2007.

== See also ==
- National Register of Historic Places listings in Phillips County, Arkansas
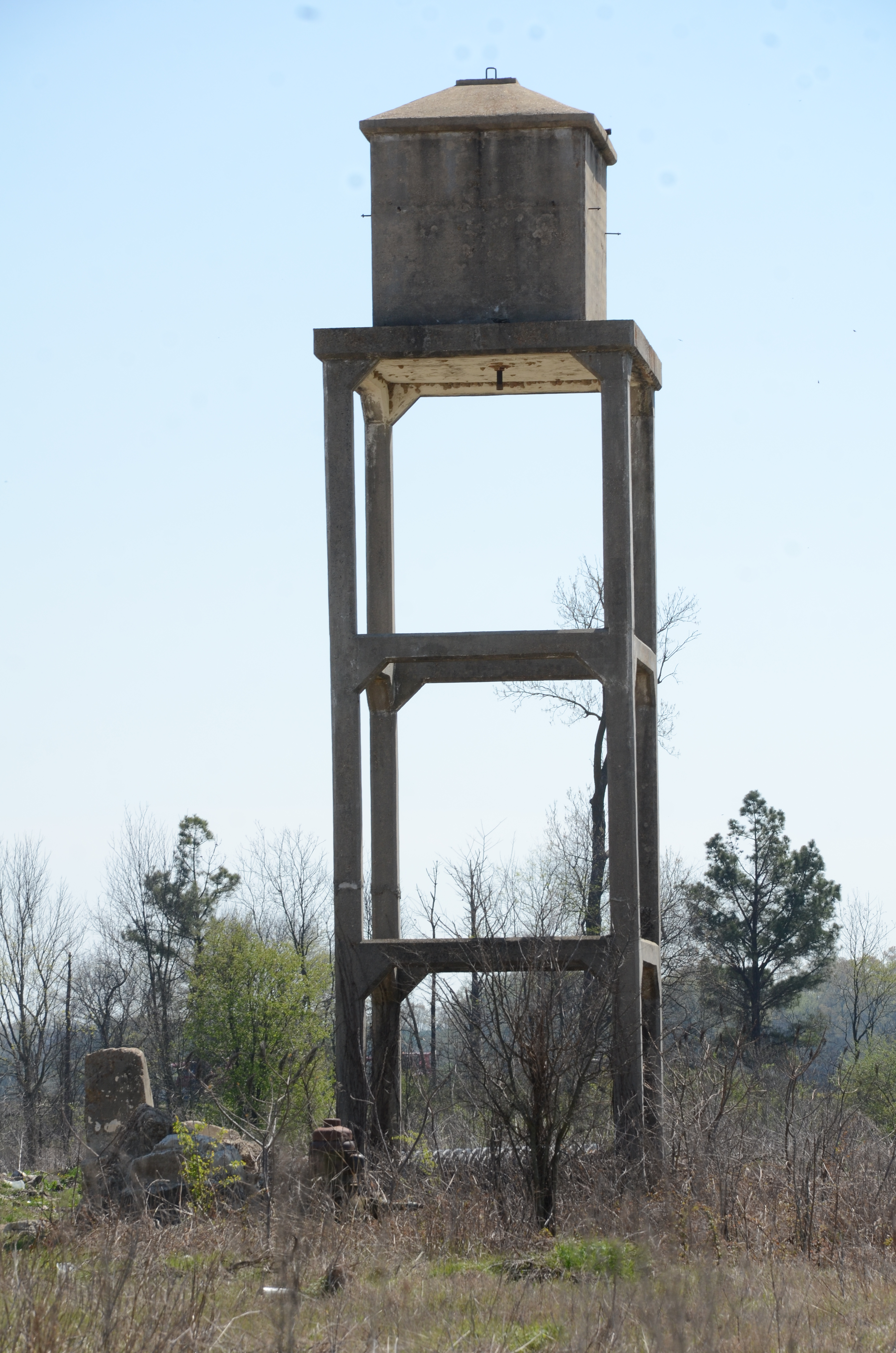
Water tower

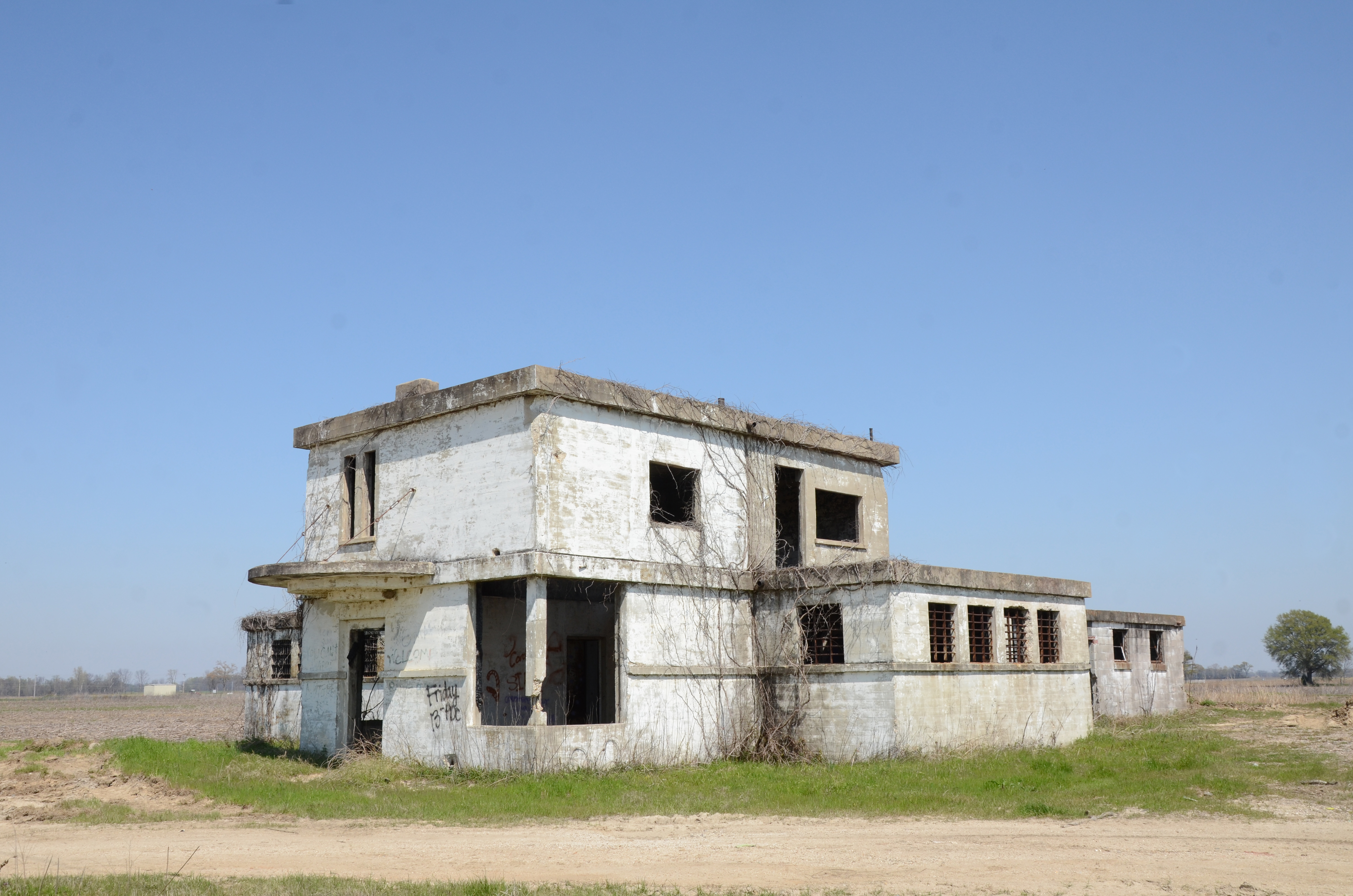

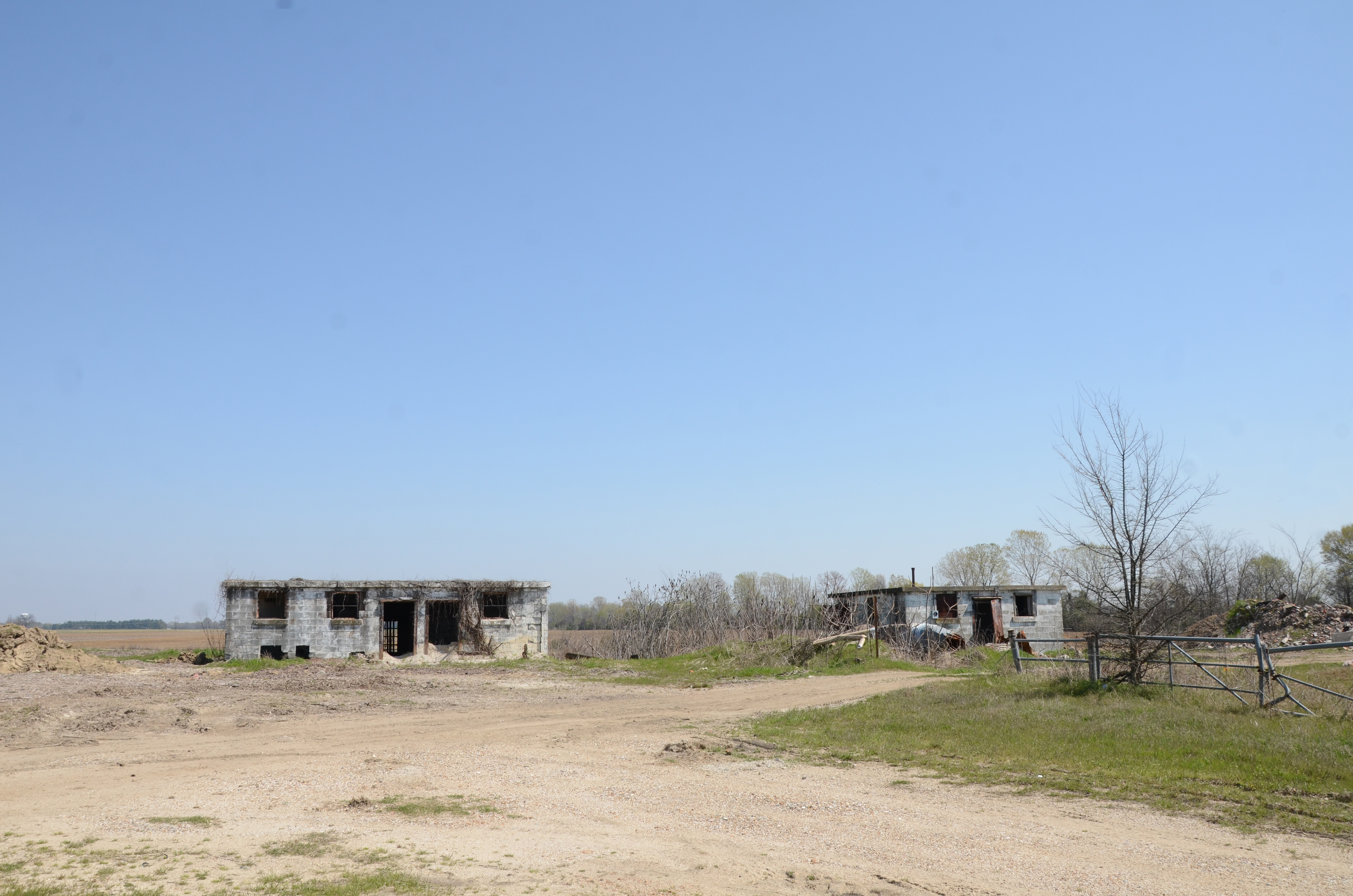

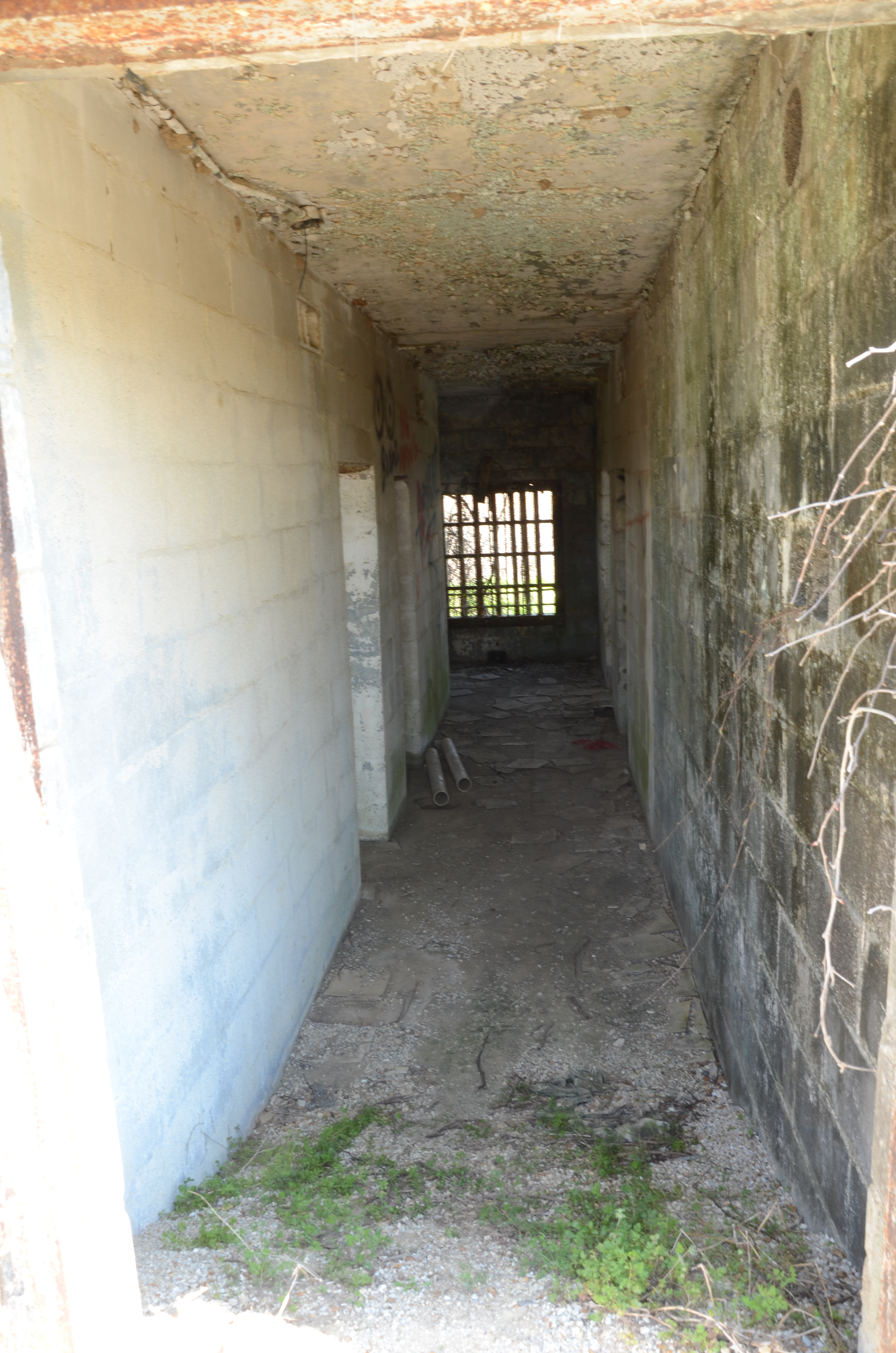
