= Richard L. Kitchens Post No. 41 =

- U.S. National Register of Historic Places
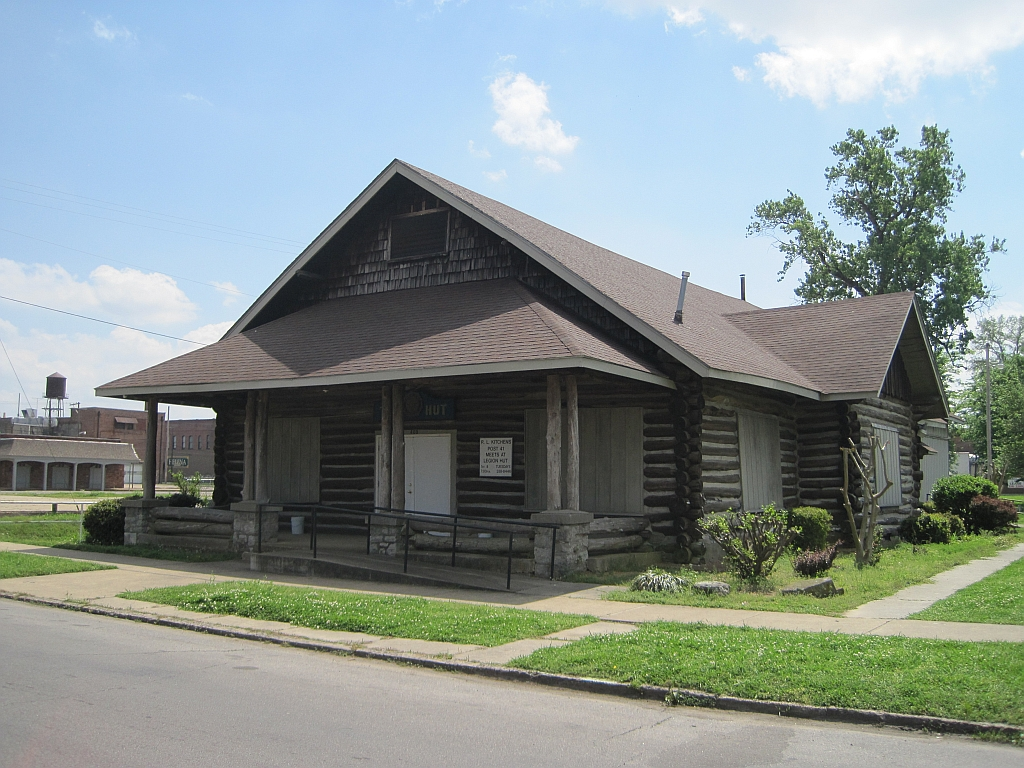

- Location within Arkansas Location within the United States
- Location: 409 Porter St., Helena, Arkansas
- Coordinates: 34°31′40″N 90°35′16″W
- Area: less than one acre
- Built: 1922
- Built by: H.H. Walters, E.T. Walker
- Architectural style: Log cabin
- NRHP reference No.: 76000444
- Added to NRHP: September 30, 1976

The Richard L. Kitchens Post No. 41 is a historic American Legion hall at 409 Porter Street in Helena, Arkansas. Built in 1922 to a design by a local Legionnaire, this Rustic log structure is supposedly the first American Legion hall to be referred to as a "hut", and is the oldest Legion building in the city. Its main block is built of donated materials, including the cypress logs forming its walls, and built by volunteer labor supervised by a local contractor and Legionnaire. A frame addition was added to the rear of the building in 1949 (for which the gable roof was extended), as were two shed-roof additions.

The building was listed on the National Register of Historic Places in 1976.

== See also ==
- National Register of Historic Places listings in Phillips County, Arkansas
