= Allin House =

Historic house in Arkansas, United States

- U.S. National Register of Historic Places
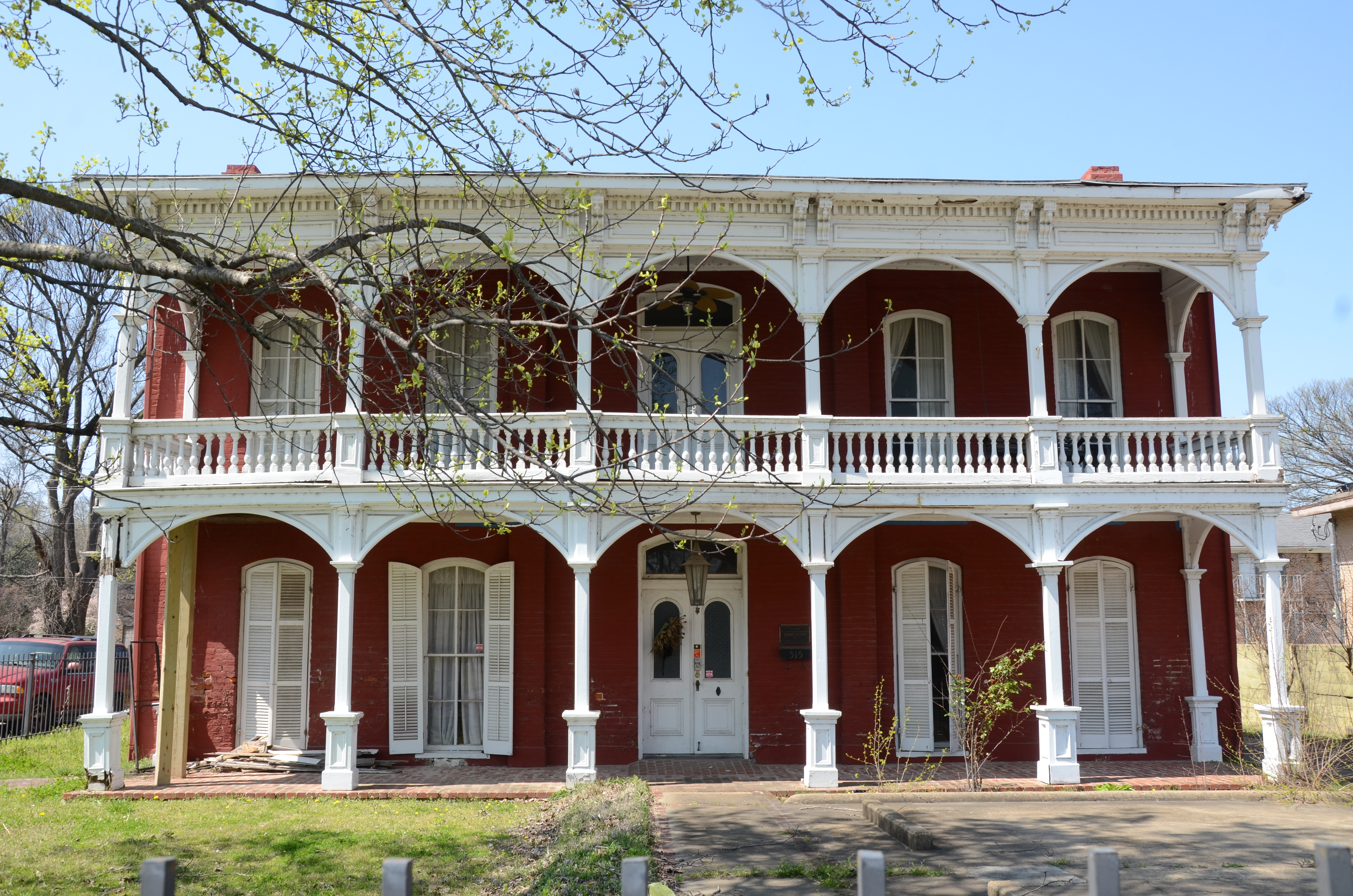

- Location within Arkansas Location within the United States
- Location: 515 Columbia Street, Helena, Arkansas
- Coordinates: 34°31′38″N 90°35′30″W
- Area: less than one acre
- Built: 1856
- Architectural style: Victorian Renaissance
- NRHP reference No.: 73000383
- Added to NRHP: June 4, 1973

The Allin House is a historic house located at 515 Columbia Street in Helena-West Helena, Arkansas.

== Description and history ==
It is a two-story brick structure, with a hip roof topped by a flat section once surrounded by either iron or wooden railings. The main facade has a two-story porch, supported by six simple wooden posts, with an ornate entablature and paired brackets in the cornice above the posts. The main roofline also has paired brackets. The house was probably built in the 1850s, and is noted for its transitional Italianate-Queen Anne styling. It is also notable as the home from 1868 until his death in 1881 of Henderson Robinson, an African-American who served in a variety of county offices during the Reconstruction Era after the American Civil War.

The house was listed on the National Register of Historic Places on June 4, 1973.

== See also ==
- National Register of Historic Places listings in Phillips County, Arkansas
