= Keesee House =

Historic house in Arkansas, United States

- U.S. National Register of Historic Places
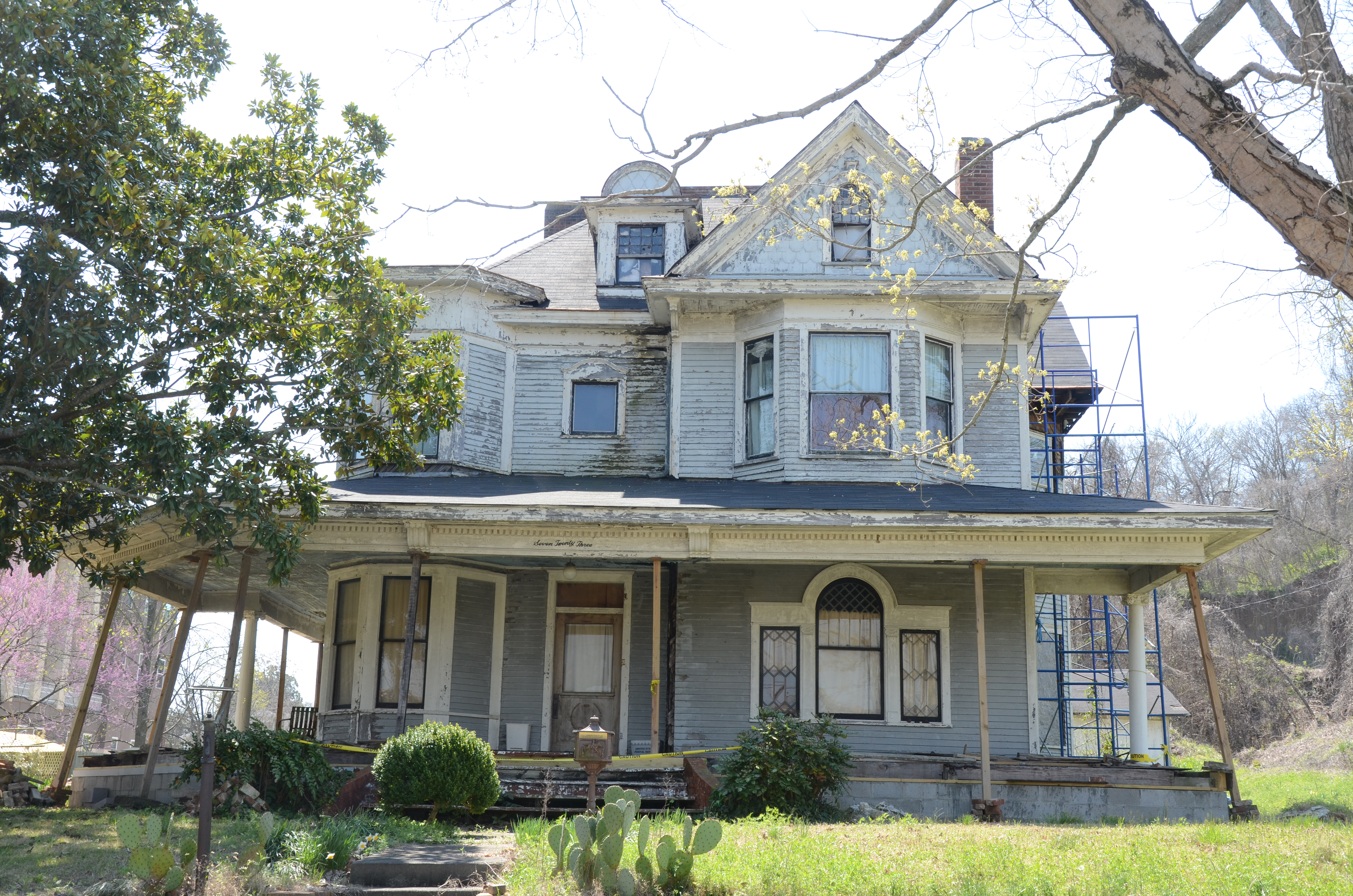
- Keesee House undergoing renovations March, 2016

- Location within Arkansas Location within the United States
- Location: 723 Arkansas St., Helena, Arkansas
- Coordinates: 34°31′18″N 90°35′31″W
- Area: less than one acre
- Built: 1901
- Architectural style: Queen Anne
- NRHP reference No.: 83001162
- Added to NRHP: September 8, 1983

The Keesee House is a historic house at 723 Arkansas Street in Helena, Arkansas. It is a 2 1/2-story wood-frame structure, built in 1901 for Thomas Woodfin Keesee, the son of a local plantation owner. It is an excellent local example of transitional Queen Anne-Colonial Revival architecture, exhibiting the irregular gable projections, bays and tower of the Queen Anne, but with a restrained porch treatment with Ionic columns. The exterior is sheathed in a variety of clapboarding and decorative shingling, and there are wood panels with carved garland swags.

The house was listed on the National Register of Historic Places in 1983.

== See also ==
- National Register of Historic Places listings in Phillips County, Arkansas
