= Denison House (Helena-West Helena, Arkansas) =

Historic house in Arkansas, United States

- U.S. National Register of Historic Places
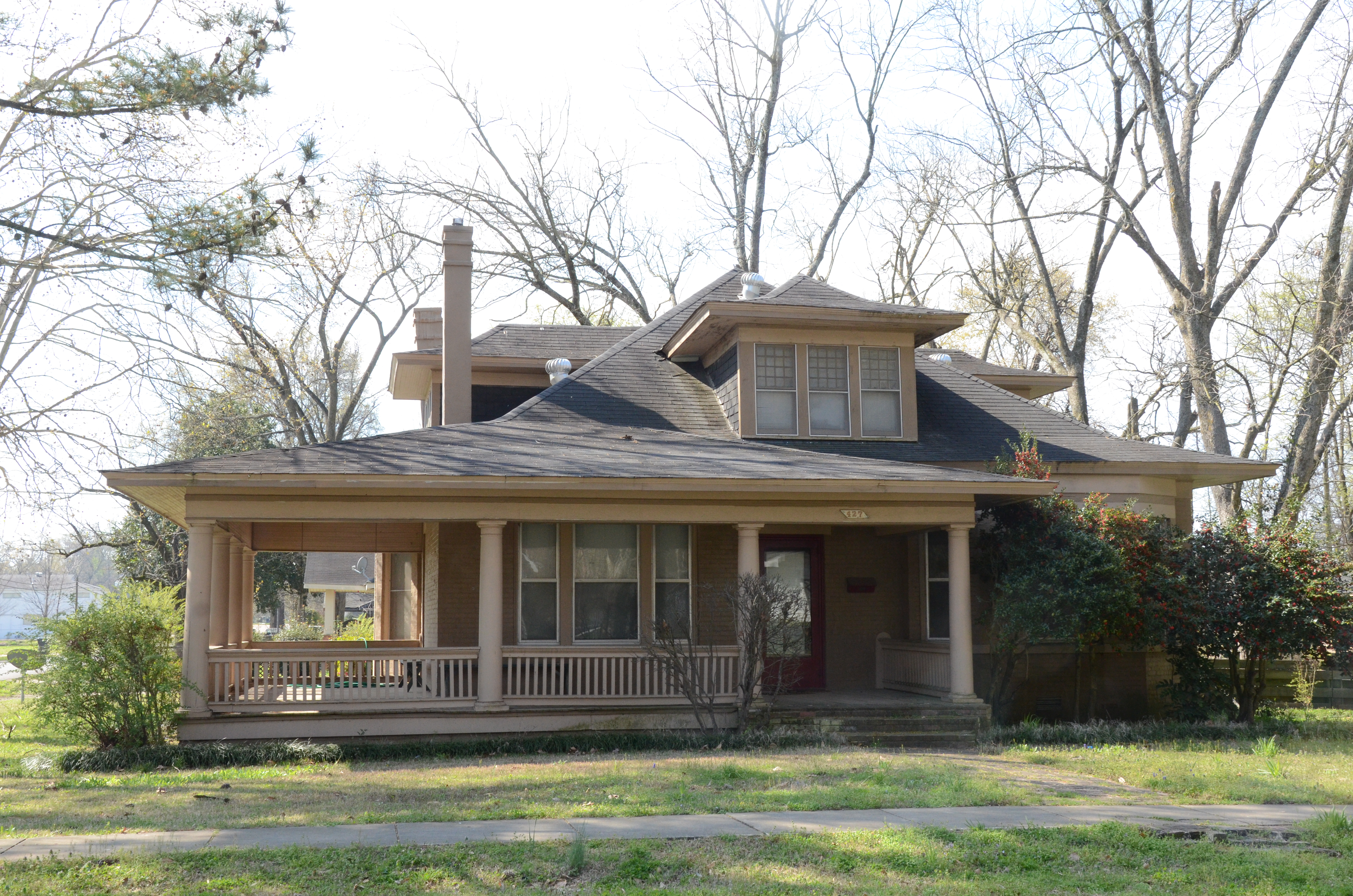

- Location within Arkansas Location within the United States
- Location: 427 Garland Ave., West Helena, Arkansas
- Coordinates: 34°32′44″N 90°38′25″W
- Built: 1910
- Architect: J.W. Denison
- Architectural style: Colonial Revival
- MPS: West Helena MPS
- NRHP reference No.: 96001132
- Added to NRHP: October 31, 1996

The Denison House is a historic house at 427 Garland Avenue in West Helena, Arkansas. It is a single-story brick structure with a broad and shallow hip roof with wide hip-roof dormers, built in 1910 by J. W. Denison, West Helena's first mayor. It has a wraparound porch supported by Tuscan columns. It is one of West Helena's finest Colonial Revival houses.

The house was listed on the National Register of Historic Places in 1996.

== See also ==
- National Register of Historic Places listings in Phillips County, Arkansas
