= Temple Beth El Cemetery =

Historic cemetery in Arkansas, United States

- U.S. National Register of Historic Places
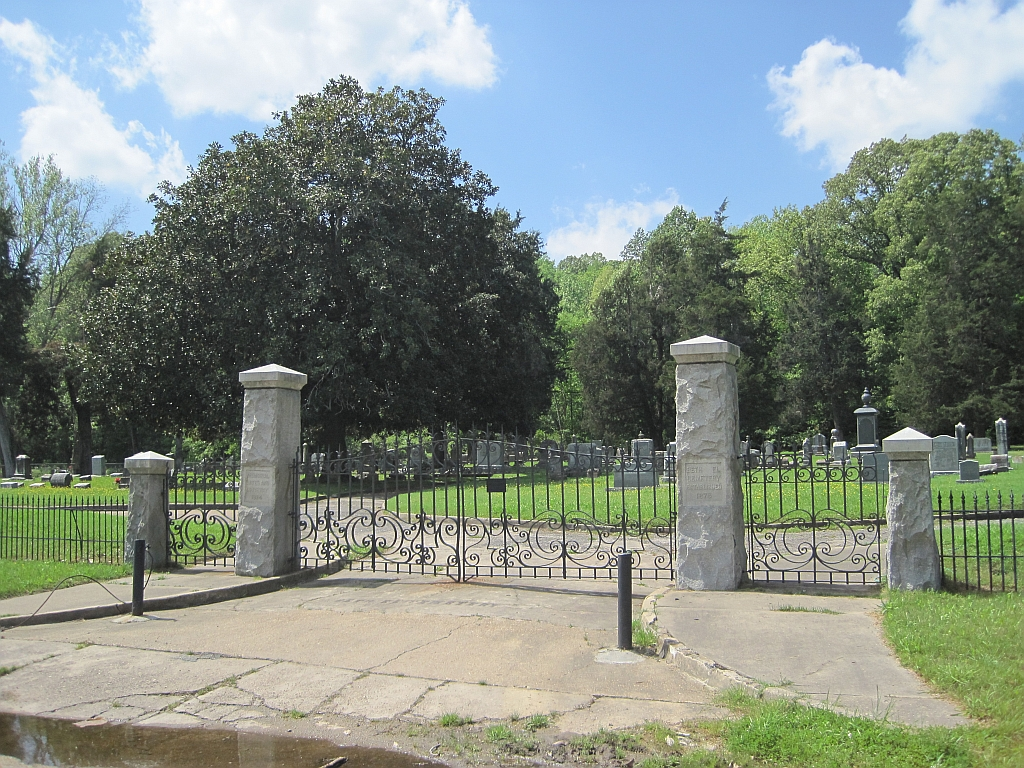

- Location within Arkansas Location within the United States
- Location: Mable and N. Holly Sts., Helena, Arkansas
- Coordinates: 34°32′46″N 90°35′21″W
- Area: 2.5 acres (1.0 ha)
- Built: 1865
- NRHP reference No.: 100003984
- Added to NRHP: May 28, 2019

Temple Beth El Cemetery is located at Sterling Road and Mable Street, north of the center of Helena, Arkansas. It is basically rectangular in shape, covering 2.5 acres (1.0 ha) on the west side of Sterling Road. It is ringed by iron fencing, with the main access entrance on Sterling Road. A paved road network divides the cemetery into three sections of roughly equal size. There are more than 300 marked graves, the earliest dating to 1862; it was moved from Helena's first Jewish cemetery after this one opened in 1875. The first cemetery was an informal site near Magnolia Cemetery, all of whose graves were moved here.

The cemetery was listed on the National Register of Historic Places in 2019.

== See also ==
- National Register of Historic Places listings in Phillips County, Arkansas
