= National Register of Historic Places listings in Phillips County, Arkansas =

Location of Phillips County in Arkansas

This is a list of the National Register of Historic Places listings in Phillips County, Arkansas.

This is intended to be a complete list of the properties and districts on the National Register of Historic Places in Phillips County, Arkansas, United States. The locations of National Register properties and districts for which the latitude and longitude coordinates are included below, may be seen in a map.

There are 58 properties and districts listed on the National Register in the county, including 2 National Historic Landmarks. Another 4 properties that were once listed have since been removed.

Contents: Counties in Arkansas
- Arkansas
- Ashley
- Baxter
- Benton
- Boone
- Bradley
- Calhoun
- Carroll
- Chicot
- Clark
- Clay
- Cleburne
- Cleveland
- Columbia
- Conway
- Craighead
- Crawford
- Crittenden
- Cross
- Dallas
- Desha
- Drew
- Faulkner
- Franklin
- Fulton
- Garland
- Grant
- Greene
- Hempstead
- Hot Spring
- Howard
- Independence
- Izard
- Jackson
- Jefferson
- Johnson
- Lafayette
- Lawrence
- Lee
- Lincoln
- Little River
- Logan
- Lonoke
- Madison
- Marion
- Miller
- Mississippi
- Monroe
- Montgomery
- Nevada
- Newton
- Ouachita
- Perry
- Phillips
- Pike
- Poinsett
- Polk
- Pope
- Prairie
- Pulaski (Little Rock)
- Randolph
- St. Francis
- Saline
- Scott
- Searcy
- Sebastian
- Sevier
- Sharp
- Stone
- Union
- Van Buren
- Washington
- White
- Woodruff
- Yell

This National Park Service list is complete through NPS recent listings posted October 9, 2026.

== Current listings ==
	Name on the Register	Image	Date listed	Location	City or town	Description
1	Allin House	Allin House	June 4, 1973 (#73000383)	515 Columbia St. 34°31′38″N 90°35′30″W	Helena-West Helena	
2	Almer Store	Almer Store	October 18, 1974 (#74000488)	824 Columbia St. 34°31′42″N 90°35′20″W	Helena-West Helena	
3	Altman House	Altman House	January 21, 1988 (#87002497)	1202 Perry St. 34°31′47″N 90°35′50″W	Helena-West Helena	
4	Battery A Site, Battle of Helena	Battery A Site, Battle of Helena	August 18, 1992 (#92001012)	Northwest of the junction of Adams and Columbia Sts. 34°32′15″N 90°35′33″W	Helena-West Helena	
5	Battery B Site, Battle of Helena	Battery B Site, Battle of Helena	August 18, 1992 (#92001011)	Northeast of the junction of Liberty St. and Summit Rd. 34°32′02″N 90°35′51″W	Helena-West Helena	
6	Battery C Site	Battery C Site	December 1, 1978 (#78000615)	Clark and York Sts. 34°31′29″N 90°35′39″W	Helena-West Helena	
7	Battery D	Battery D	September 17, 1974 (#74000489)	Military Rd. 34°31′05″N 90°35′22″W	Helena-West Helena	
8	Beech Street Historic District	Beech Street Historic District	January 30, 1987 (#86003314)	Roughly bounded by McDonough, Columbia, Beech, Elm, Perry, and College; 34°31′38″N 90°35′48″W	Helena-West Helena	
9	Dr. Alfred A. and Adele Berger House		May 12, 2021 (#100006536)	121 Stonebrook Rd. 34°32′11″N 90°37′46″W	Helena-West Helena	
10	Centennial Baptist Church	Centennial Baptist Church	March 26, 1987 (#87000518)	York and Columbia Sts. 34°31′32″N 90°35′27″W	Helena-West Helena	
11	Cherry Street Historic District	Cherry Street Historic District	August 17, 1987 (#86003546)	Along Cherry St. between Porter and Elm Sts.; also Cherry St. between Porter and Perry Sts. and from Elm to the south side of Missouri St. 34°31′36″N 90°35′04″W	Helena-West Helena	Second set of addresses represents a boundary increase of May 27, 2010
12	Chicago Mill Company Office Building		October 31, 1996 (#96001133)	129 N. Washington St. 34°32′39″N 90°39′22″W	Helena-West Helena	No longer standing.
13	Coolidge House	Coolidge House	September 8, 1983 (#83001161)	820 Perry St. 34°31′46″N 90°35′36″W	Helena-West Helena	
14	Denison House	Denison House	October 31, 1996 (#96001132)	427 Garland Ave. 34°32′44″N 90°38′25″W	Helena-West Helena	
15	Estevan Hall	Estevan Hall	October 22, 1974 (#74000491)	653 S. Biscoe St. 34°30′48″N 90°35′37″W	Helena-West Helena	
16	Faust House	Faust House	October 31, 1996 (#96001130)	114 Richmond Hill; 34°32′36″N 90°38′02″W	Helena-West Helena	
17	Federal Building-United States Post Office and Court House	Federal Building-United States Post Office and Court House	May 5, 2015 (#15000204)	617 Walnut St. 34°31′43″N 90°35′15″W	Helena	Now called the Jacob Trieber Federal Building, United States Post Office, and United States Court House.
18	First Baptist Church	First Baptist Church	May 13, 1991 (#91000587)	Junction of Pine and Carruth Sts. 34°33′26″N 90°54′44″W	Marvell	
19	First Presbyterian Church	First Presbyterian Church	January 10, 2021 (#100007322)	629 Porter St. 34°31′41″N 90°35′28″W	Helena-West Helena	
20	Henry and Cornelia Ford Farm	Henry and Cornelia Ford Farm	March 2, 2006 (#06000085)	1335 County Road 249; 34°37′12″N 90°42′28″W	Lexa	
21	Gemmill-Faust House	Gemmill-Faust House	October 31, 1996 (#96001134)	321 St. Andrew's Terrace; 34°32′20″N 90°38′01″W	Helena-West Helena	
22	William H. Grey Gravesite	William H. Grey Gravesite	September 27, 2019 (#100004441)	108 Wire St. 34°32′29″N 90°35′45″W	Helena-West Helena	
23	Helena Aero Tech Hangars		May 13, 2021 (#100006577)	124 Cty. Rd. 204 (Thompson-Robbins Airport); 34°34′10″N 90°40′18″W	Helena-West Helena	
24	Helena Confederate Cemetery	Helena Confederate Cemetery	May 3, 1996 (#96000501)	Southwestern corner of Maple Hill Cemetery, approximately 0.5 miles north of the junction of Poplar and Adams Sts. 34°32′30″N 90°35′34″W	Helena-West Helena	
25	Helena Depot	Helena Depot	November 5, 1987 (#87000877)	Natchez and Missouri Sts. 34°31′19″N 90°35′09″W	Helena-West Helena	
26	Helena Library and Museum	Helena Library and Museum	December 6, 1975 (#75000400)	623 Peach St. 34°31′42″N 90°35′19″W	Helena-West Helena	
27	Helena National Guard Armory	Helena National Guard Armory	January 24, 2007 (#06001266)	511 Miller St. 34°31′53″N 90°35′19″W	Helena-West Helena	
28	Helena World Building		May 12, 2021 (#100006537)	417 York St. 34°31′33″N 90°35′17″W	Helena-West Helena	
29	Sidney H. Horner House	Sidney H. Horner House	December 4, 1975 (#75000401)	626 Porter St. 34°31′41″N 90°35′26″W	Helena-West Helena	
30	Keesee House	Keesee House	September 8, 1983 (#83001162)	723 Arkansas St. 34°31′18″N 90°35′31″W	Helena-West Helena	
31	Richard L. Kitchens Post No. 41	Richard L. Kitchens Post No. 41	September 30, 1976 (#76000444)	409 Porter St. 34°31′40″N 90°35′16″W	Helena-West Helena	
32	Lakeview Resettlement Project Historic District		January 28, 2019 (#100003357)	Near the jct. of AR 85 & AR 44; 34°25′00″N 90°47′11″W	Lake View	
33	Louisiana Purchase Survey Marker	Louisiana Purchase Survey Marker	February 23, 1972 (#72000206)	Southeast of Blackton at the corner of Monroe and Phillips counties 34°38′48″N 91°03′05″W	Blackton	Extends into Lee and Monroe counties
34	Magnolia Cemetery Historic Section		October 16, 2026 (#100013532)	108 Wire Road; 34°32′32″N 90°35′46″W	Helena-West Helena	
35	Maple Hill Cemetery	Maple Hill Cemetery	April 6, 2000 (#00000318)	N. Holly St. 34°32′35″N 90°35′28″W	Helena-West Helena	
36	Mayo House	Mayo House	December 19, 1997 (#97001513)	302 Elm St. 34°33′28″N 90°54′44″W	Marvell	
37	Eliza Miller Junior and Senior High School		January 19, 2024 (#100009768)	106 Miller Loop; 34°33′22″N 90°39′37″W	Helena-West Helena	
38	Moore-Hornor House	Moore-Hornor House	June 4, 1973 (#73000384)	323 Beech St. 34°31′31″N 90°36′08″W	Helena-West Helena	
39	Myers House	Myers House	October 31, 1996 (#96001136)	221 St. Andrew's Terrace; 34°32′27″N 90°38′00″W	Helena-West Helena	
40	Nelson House	Nelson House	October 31, 1996 (#96001135)	303 St. Andrew's Terrace; 34°32′22″N 90°38′00″W	Helena-West Helena	
41	North End Elementary School		September 28, 2026 (#100013436)	1125 Columbia Street; 34°32′06″N 90°35′28″W	Helena-West Helena	
42	Perry Street Historic District	Perry Street Historic District	November 26, 1986 (#86002954)	Perry St. between Pecan and Franklin and Pecan St. from Porter to Perry; 34°31′43″N 90°35′21″W	Helena-West Helena	
43	Phillips County Courthouse	Phillips County Courthouse	July 15, 1977 (#77000265)	622 Cherry St. 34°31′42″N 90°35′06″W	Helena-West Helena	
44	Phillips County Penal Farm Historic District	Phillips County Penal Farm Historic District	January 24, 2007 (#06001268)	County Road 353 south of U.S. Route 49; 34°33′06″N 90°48′11″W	Poplar Grove	
45	Jerome Bonaparte Pillow House	Jerome Bonaparte Pillow House	May 7, 1973 (#73000385)	718 Perry St. 34°31′44″N 90°35′31″W	Helena-West Helena	
46	E.S. Ready House	E.S. Ready House	January 1, 1976 (#76000445)	929 Beech St. 34°31′55″N 90°35′33″W	Helena-West Helena	
47	Richardson-Turner House	Richardson-Turner House	May 29, 1998 (#98000583)	1469 Highway 1, N. 34°35′09″N 90°47′17″W	Lexa	
48	St. Mary's Catholic Church	St. Mary's Catholic Church	January 24, 2007 (#06001278)	123 Columbia; 34°31′28″N 90°35′31″W	Helena-West Helena	
49	William A. Short House	William A. Short House	April 18, 1985 (#85000833)	317 Biscoe St. 34°31′05″N 90°35′31″W	Helena-West Helena	
50	Spirit of the American Doughboy Monument-Helena	Spirit of the American Doughboy Monument-Helena	May 23, 1997 (#97000455)	Junction of Cherry and Perry Sts. 34°31′42″N 90°35′06″W	Helena-West Helena	
51	William Nicholas Straub House	William Nicholas Straub House	April 18, 1985 (#85000834)	531 Perry St. 34°31′37″N 90°35′31″W	Helena-West Helena	
52	James C. Tappan House	James C. Tappan House	June 4, 1973 (#73002270)	717 Poplar St. 34°31′46″N 90°35′38″W	Helena-West Helena	
53	Maj. James Alexander Tappan House	Maj. James Alexander Tappan House	September 9, 1974 (#74000493)	727 Columbia St. 34°31′59″N 90°35′28″W	Helena-West Helena	
54	Temple Beth El Cemetery	Temple Beth El Cemetery	May 28, 2019 (#100003984)	NW of intersection of Mable St. & Holly St./Sterling Rd. 34°32′46″N 90°35′21″W	Helena	
55	Turner Historic District	Turner Historic District	March 2, 2006 (#06000073)	Corners of Highway 318 and County Road 606; 34°29′31″N 90°57′24″W	Cypert	
56	Warrens Bridge	Warrens Bridge	May 18, 1995 (#95000612)	County Road 14I over Lambrook Levee Ditch; 34°20′09″N 91°00′42″W	Lambrook	
57	West House	West House	September 8, 1983 (#83001163)	229 Beech St. 34°31′39″N 90°35′33″W	Helena-West Helena	
58	White House	White House	December 22, 1982 (#82000871)	1101 Perry St. 34°31′57″N 90°35′56″W	Helena-West Helena	

== Former listings ==
	Name on the Register	Image	Date listed	Date removed	Location	City or town	Description
1	Barlow-Coolidge House		August 19, 1975 (#75000402)	September 17, 1999	917 Ohio St.	Helena-West Helena	
2	Little Cypress Creek Bridge	Little Cypress Creek Bridge	May 18, 1995 (#95000611)	January 16, 2026	County Road 66G over Little Cypress Creek; 34°33′27″N 91°01′24″W	Postelle	
3	New Light Missionary Baptist Church		December 7, 1995 (#95001410)	January 26, 2018	522 Arkansas St. 34°31′18″N 90°35′25″W	Helena-West Helena	Demolished.
4	Short-Deisch House		October 18, 1974 (#74000490)	December 28, 2002	409 Biscoe Street	Helena-West Helena	Demolished in 2002

== See also ==
- List of National Historic Landmarks in Arkansas
- National Register of Historic Places listings in Arkansas
