= Altman House =

Historic house in Arkansas, United States

- U.S. National Register of Historic Places
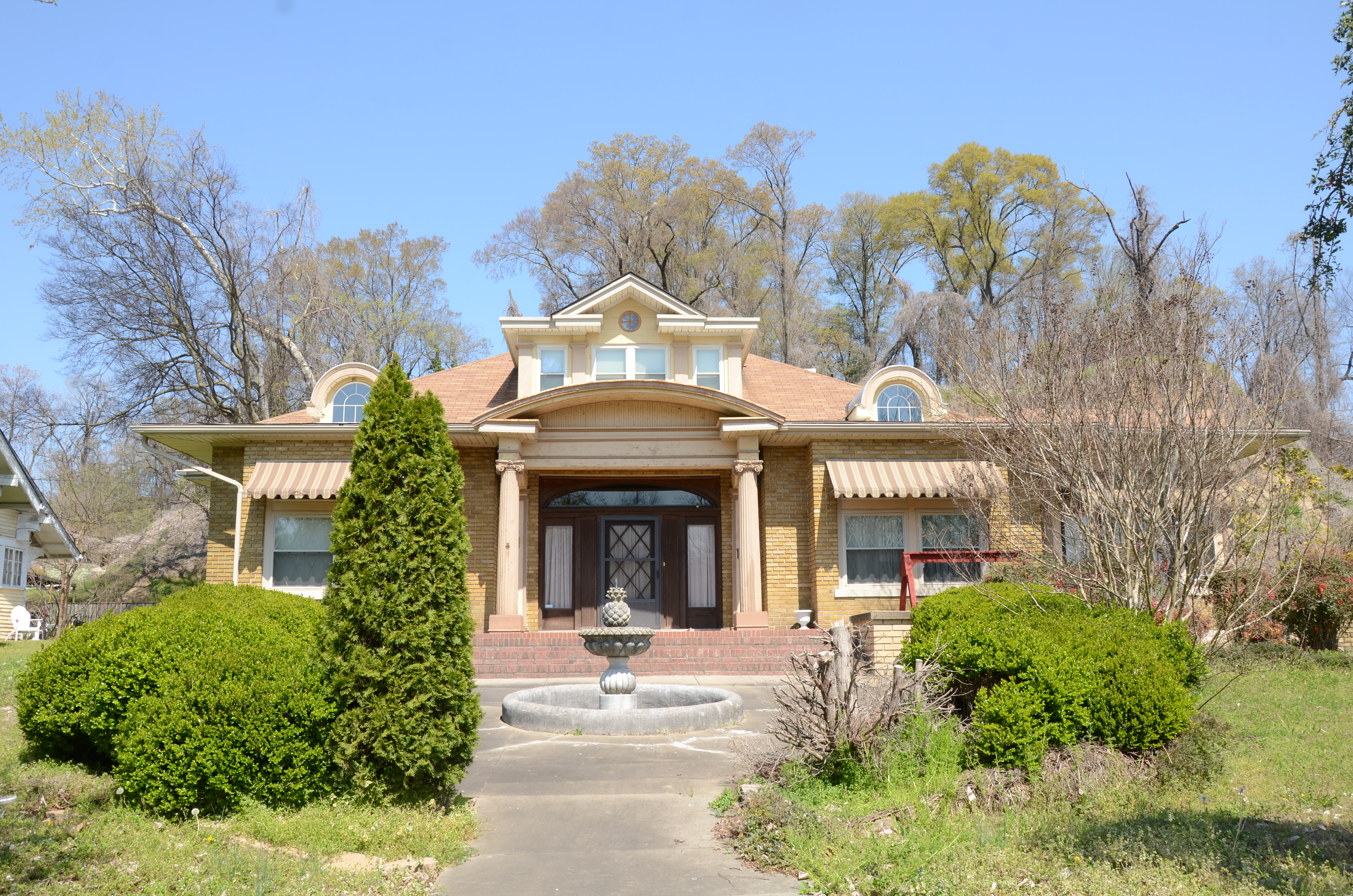

- Location within Arkansas Location within the United States
- Location: 1202 Perry St., Helena, Arkansas
- Coordinates: 34°31′47″N 90°35′50″W
- Area: less than one acre
- Built: 1914
- Architect: Newman Altman, Estelle
- Architectural style: Classical Revival, Bungalow/craftsman, Arts and Crafts
- NRHP reference No.: 87002497
- Added to NRHP: July 23, 2020

The Altman House is an historic house at 1202 Perry Street in Helena, Arkansas. It is a 1 1/2-story brick and stone structure, designed by Estelle Newman Altman as a residence for her family and built in 1914. It is a stylistically distinctive mixture of Classical Revival and Craftsman styling. It is roughly rectangular in plan, with an entry recessed behind a segmented-arch pediment supported by Ionic columns. The door is flanked by bevelled sidelight windows and is topped by an unusual elliptical transom window that is nearly 10 feet (3.0 m) wide. The bays which flank the entry have casement windows filled with diamond panes and topped by transom windows. A sunporch extends the building to the right side.

The house was listed on the National Register of Historic Places in 1988.

== See also ==
- National Register of Historic Places listings in Phillips County, Arkansas
