= Estevan Hall =

Historic house in Arkansas, United States

- U.S. National Register of Historic Places
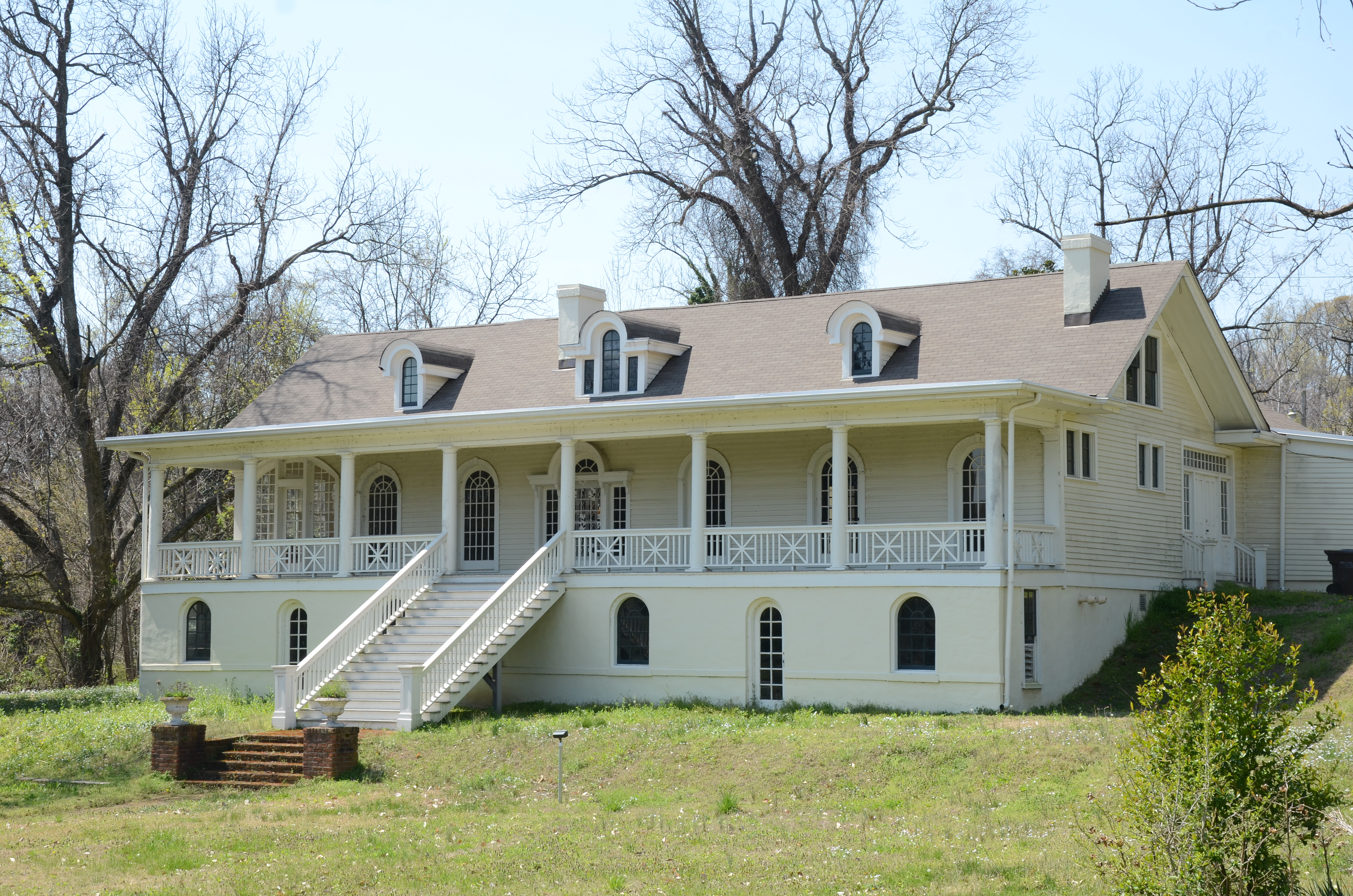

- Location within Arkansas Location within the United States
- Location: 653 S. Biscoe St., Helena, Arkansas
- Coordinates: 34°30′48″N 90°35′37″W
- Area: less than one acre
- Built: 1826
- NRHP reference No.: 74000491
- Added to NRHP: October 22, 1974

Estevan Hall is a historic house at 653 South Biscoe Street in Helena, Arkansas. With a construction history estimated to begin in the late 1820s, it is probably the oldest building in Phillips County, Arkansas, and has been in the hands of the Hanks family, early settlers of Helena, throughout. It is an architecturally eclectic structure, the main style of which is derived from alterations in the 1870s which had a strong influence of the French architecture of New Orleans. It is set high on a ridge overlooking the Mississippi River, and has an expansive veranda typical of plantation houses further south. Its interior has been little altered since renovations and modernizations in 1919.

The house was listed on the National Register of Historic Places in 1974.

== See also ==
- National Register of Historic Places listings in Phillips County, Arkansas
