= Beech Street Historic District (Helena–West Helena, Arkansas) =

Historic district in Arkansas, United States

- U.S. National Register of Historic Places
- U.S. Historic district
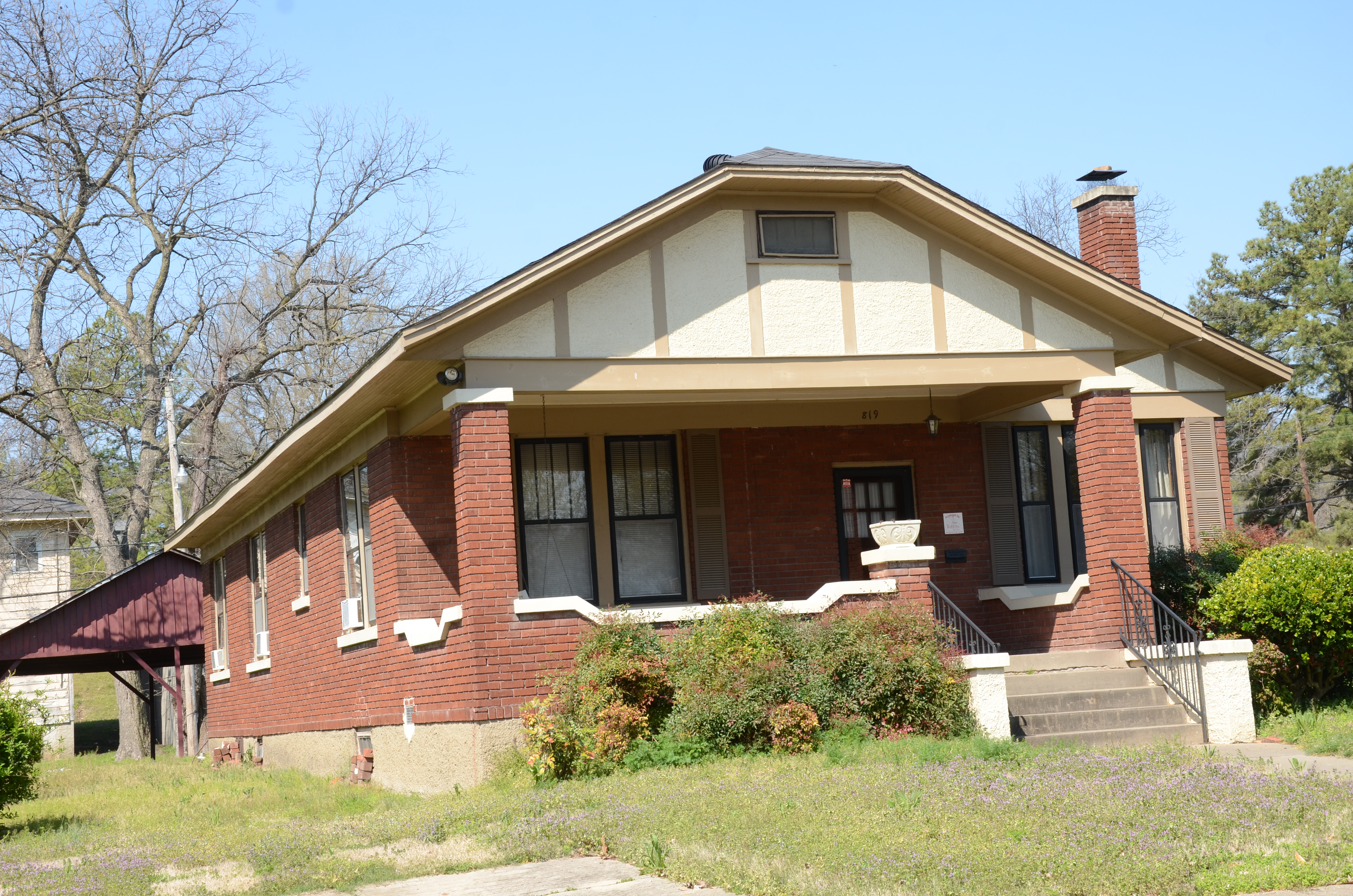

- Location within Arkansas Location within the United States
- Location: Roughly bounded by McDonough, Columbia, Beech, Elm, Perry and College, Helena, Arkansas
- Coordinates: 34.527222°N 90.596667°W
- Area: 54.5 acres (22.1 ha)
- Architect: Charles L. Thompson
- Architectural style: Colonial Revival, Bungalow/Craftsman, Queen Anne
- NRHP reference No.: 86003314
- Added to NRHP: January 30, 1987

The Beech Street Historic District is a large residential historic district on the west side of the Helena section of Helena–West Helena, Arkansas. The district's spine is Beech Street, extending roughly from Phillips Street in the south to McDonough Street in the north, and widens out to include about three blocks each of college, Poplar, and Columbia Streets at its northern end. The district has long been a fashionable residential area of Helena, and includes a well-preserved diversity of residential architecture, dating from 1858 to 1935, with the Colonial Revival predominating. It includes 133 buildings, of which about 80 are historically significant. These properties are generally set on larger lots with attractive terraced landscaping.

The district was listed on the National Register of Historic Places in 1987; eight properties were previously listed separately.

== See also ==
- National Register of Historic Places listings in Phillips County, Arkansas
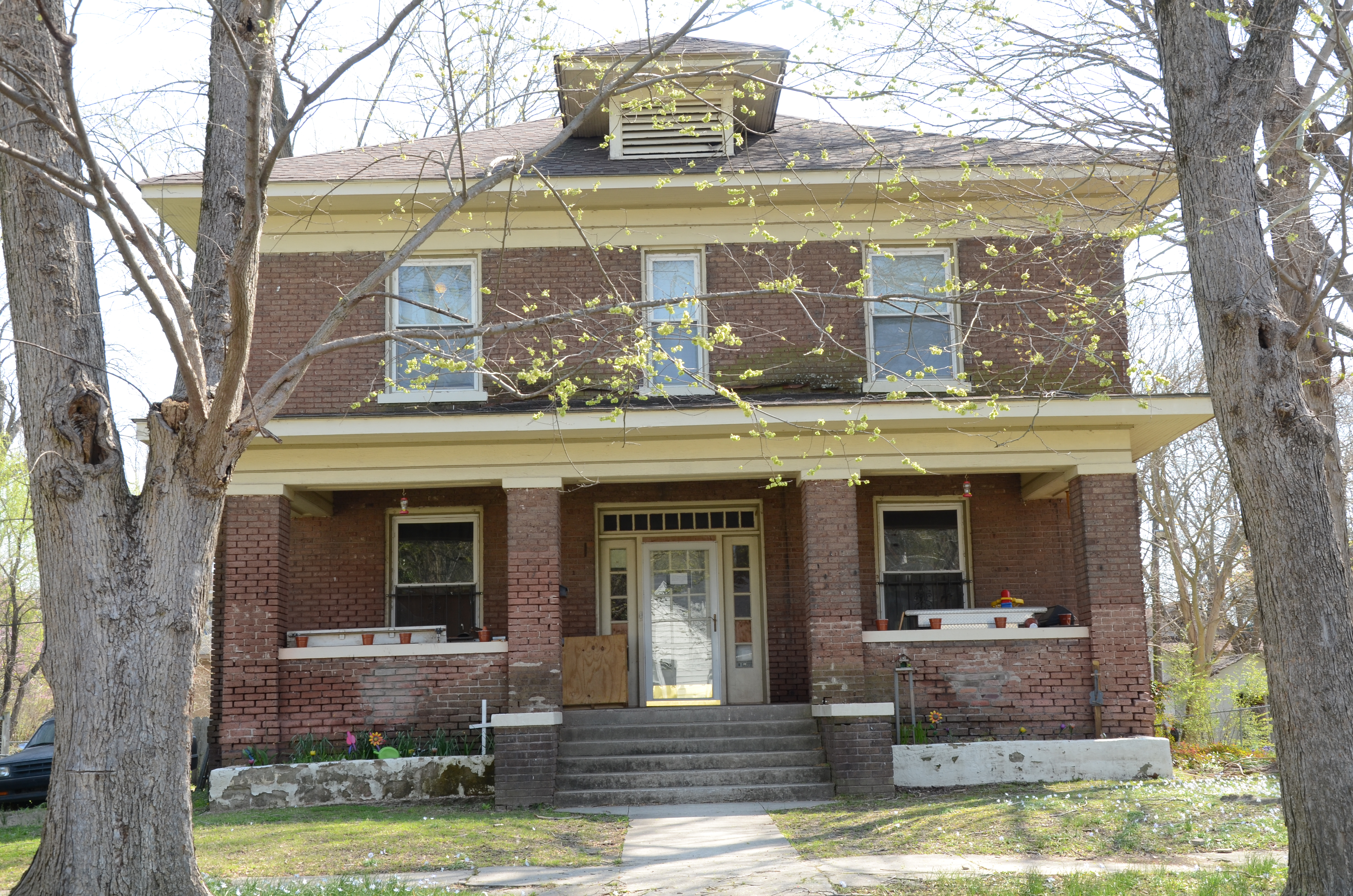
Beech Street Historic District House

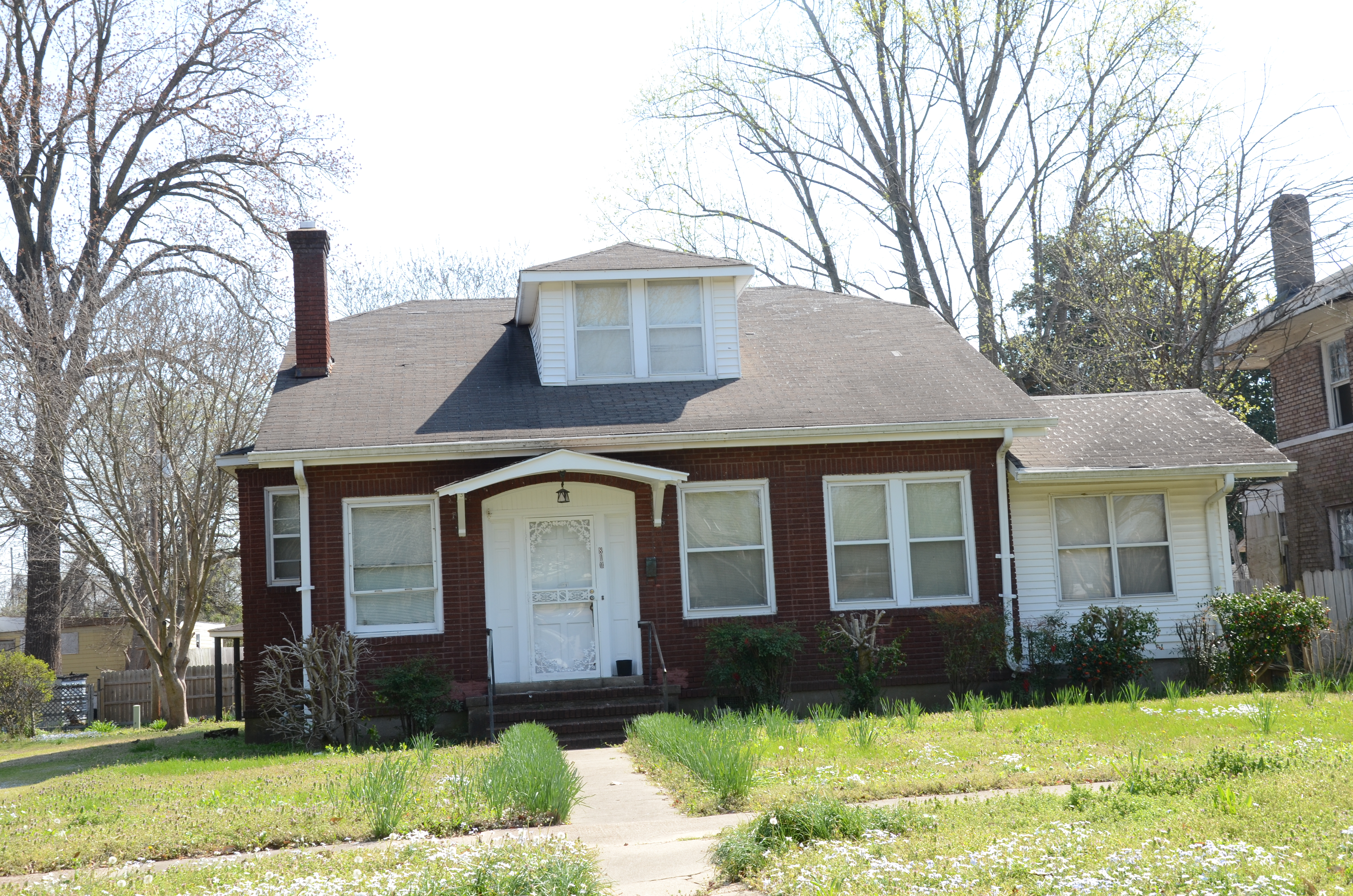
Beech Street Historic District House

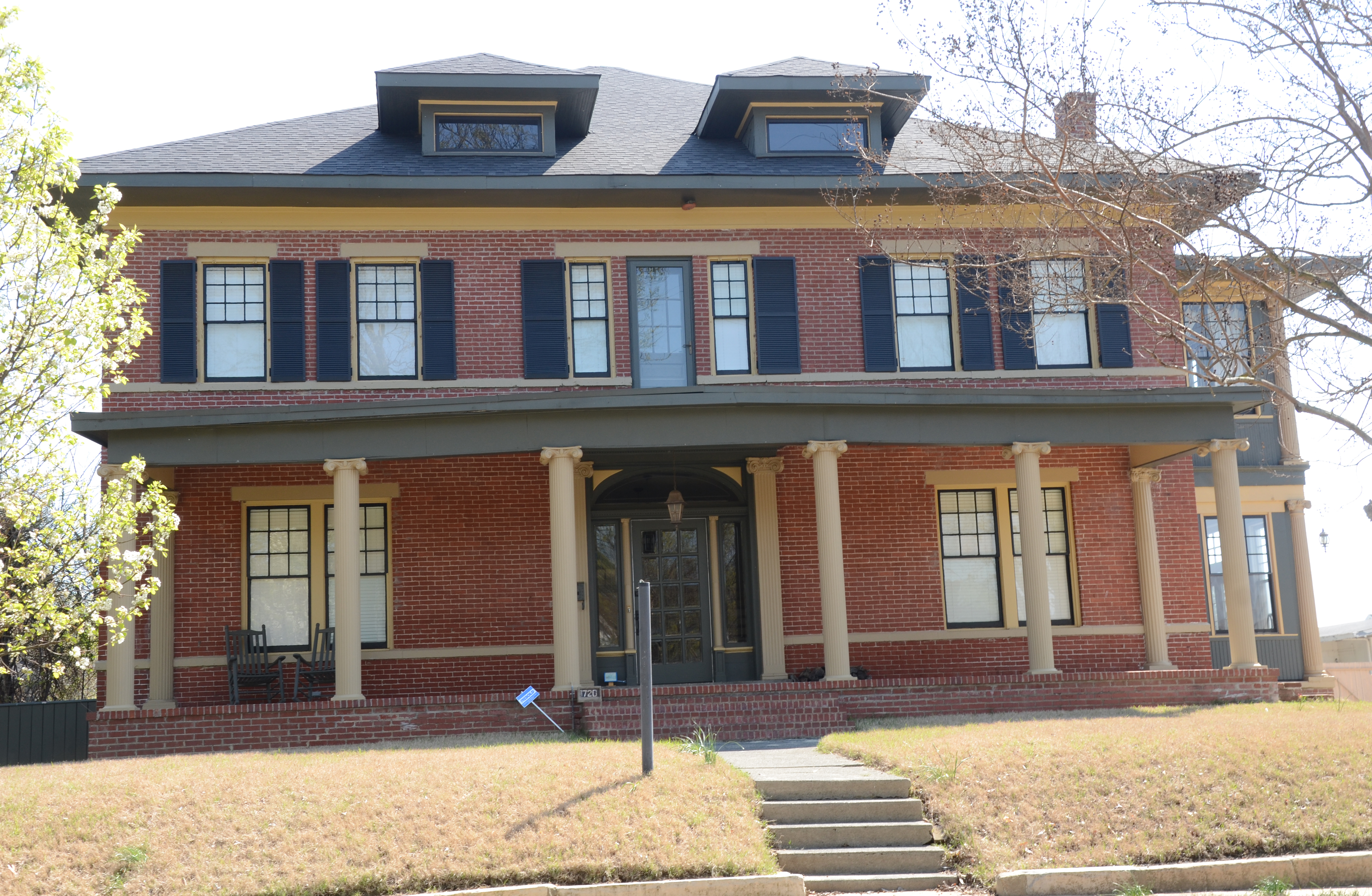
Beech Street Historic District House

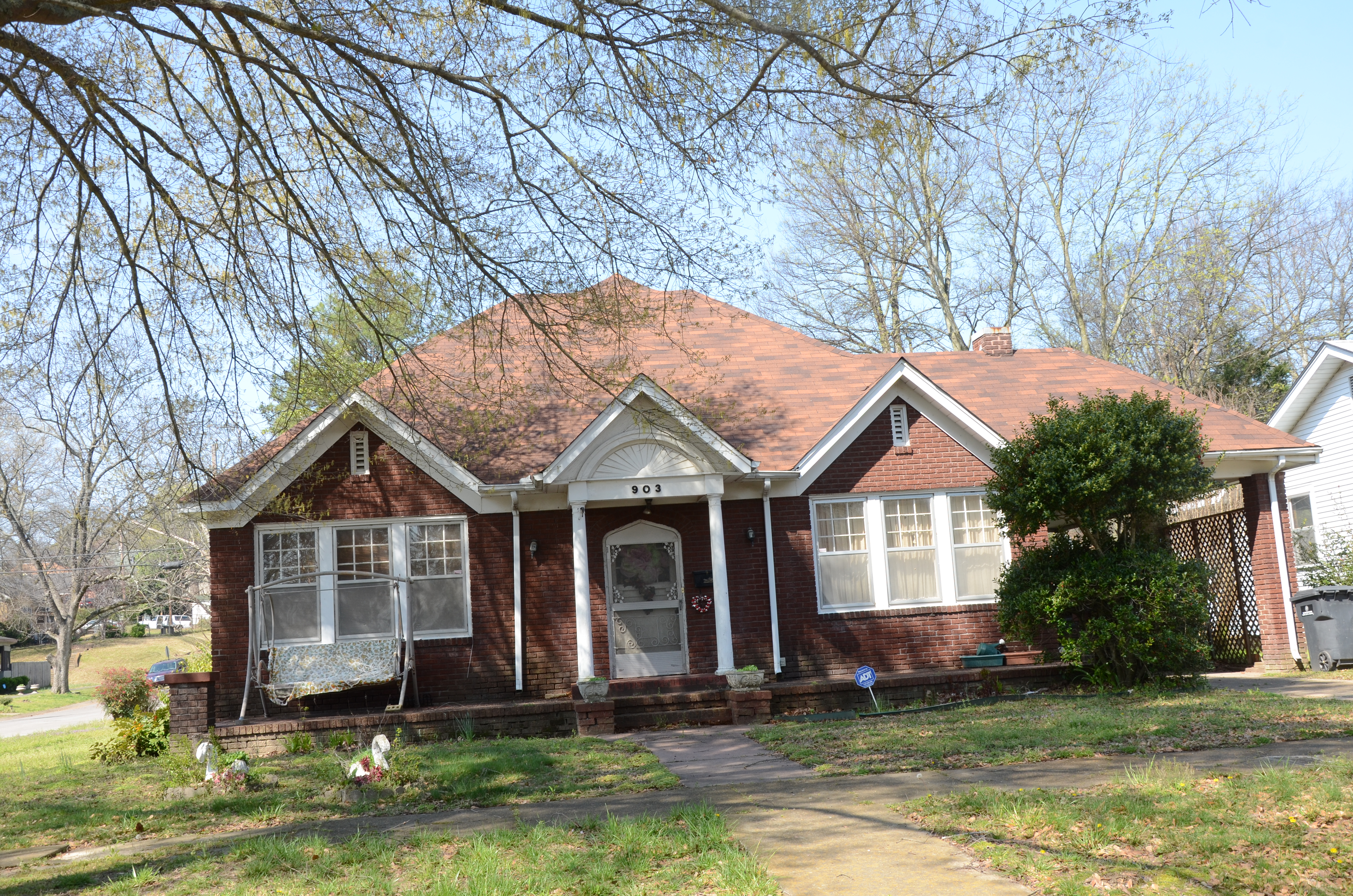
Beech Street Historic District House
