= West Helena, Arkansas =

- City
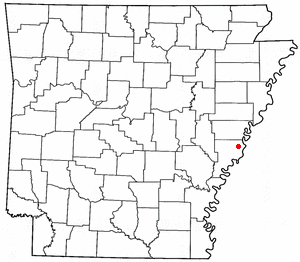
- Location of West Helena, Arkansas
- Coordinates: 34°32′45″N 90°38′40″W
- Country: United States
- State: Arkansas
- County: Phillips

Area
  - Total: 4.4 sq mi (11.5 km^{2})
  - Land: 4.4 sq mi (11.5 km^{2})
  - Water: 0 sq mi (0.0 km^{2})
- Elevation: 253 ft (77 m)

Population (2000)
  - Total: 8,689
  - Density: 1,956/sq mi (755.4/km^{2})
- Time zone: UTC-6 (Central (CST))
  - Summer (DST): UTC-5 (CDT)
- ZIP code: 72390
- Area code: 870
- FIPS code: 05-74450
- GNIS feature ID: 0058852

West Helena is the western portion of Helena-West Helena, Arkansas, a city in Phillips County, Arkansas, United States. As of the 2000 census, this portion of the city population was 8,689.

Historically, West Helena and its sister city Helena, located on the Mississippi River, have been two of the focal points in the history of the development of the blues. The cities consolidated on January 1, 2006. Helena is the birthplace of Arkansas' former senior United States senator, Blanche Lincoln.

== Geography ==
West Helena is located at 34°32′45″N 90°38′40″W (34.545702, -90.644346).

According to the United States Census Bureau, West Helena had a total area of 4.4 square miles (11 km^{2}), all of it land.

== Demographics ==
Historical population
Census	Pop.	Note	%±
1920	6,226		—
1930	4,489		−27.9%
1940	4,717		5.1%
1950	6,107		29.5%
1960	8,385		37.3%
1970	11,007		31.3%
1980	11,367		3.3%
1990	9,695		−14.7%
2000	8,565		−11.7%
U.S. Decennial Census

=== Racial and ethnic composition ===
West Helena city, Arkansas – Racial and ethnic composition Note: the US Census treats Hispanic/Latino as an ethnic category. This table excludes Latinos from the racial categories and assigns them to a separate category. Hispanics/Latinos may be of any race.
Race / Ethnicity (NH = Non-Hispanic)	Pop 2000	% 2000
White alone (NH)	2,815	32.40%
Black or African American alone (NH)	5,681	65.38%
Native American or Alaska Native alone (NH)	20	0.23%
Asian alone (NH)	33	0.38%
Native Hawaiian or Pacific Islander alone (NH)	1	0.01%
Other race alone (NH)	4	0.05%
Mixed race or Multiracial (NH)	47	0.55%
Hispanic or Latino (any race)	88	1.01%
Total	8,689	100.00%

=== 2000 census ===
As of the census of 2000, there were 8,689 people, 3,204 households, and 2,223 families residing in West Helena. The population density was 1,956.6 inhabitants per square mile (755.4/km^{2}). There were 3,518 housing units at an average density of 792.2 per square mile (305.9/km^{2}). The racial makeup of West Helena was 32.77% White, 65.69% Black or African American, 0.23% Native American, 0.38% Asian, 0.02% Pacific Islander, 0.33% from other races, and 0.58% from two or more races. 1.01% of the population were Hispanic or Latino of any race.

There were 3,204 households, out of which 36.0% had children under the age of 18 living with them, 36.8% were married couples living together, 29.2% had a female householder with no husband present, and 30.6% were non-families. 27.6% of all households were made up of individuals, and 11.5% had someone living alone who was 65 years of age or older. The average household size was 2.71 and the average family size was 3.32.

In West Helena, the population was spread out, with 34.1% under the age of 18, 10.1% from 18 to 24, 23.9% from 25 to 44, 19.6% from 45 to 64, and 12.3% who were 65 years of age or older. The median age was 30 years. For every 100 females, there were 80.7 males. For every 100 females age 18 and over, there were 71.5 males.

The median income for a household in West Helena was $21,130, and the median income for a family was $25,014. Males had a median income of $22,971 versus $17,225 for females. The per capita income for West Helena was $11,234. About 30.9% of families and 35.4% of the population were below the poverty line, including 49.5% of those under age 18 and 27.2% of those age 65 or over.

== Education ==
Helena-West Helena School District operates schools in what was West Helena.

Schools in the former West Helena.

- Central High School
- Eliza Miller Junior High School
- Beechcrest Elementary School
- Westside Elementary School
- Woodruff Elementary School

== Climate ==
The climate in this area is characterized by hot, humid summers and generally mild to cool winters. According to the Köppen Climate Classification system, West Helena has a humid subtropical climate, abbreviated "Cfa" on climate maps.

== Notable people ==
- Anthony Boone, college basketball coach for Central Arkansas
- Angie Craig (born 1972), U.S. representative for Minnesota
- Odessa Harris (1936–2007), singer
- Blanche Lincoln (born 1960), U.S. senator for Arkansas
- Lonnie Shields (born 1956), electric blues singer, songwriter, and guitarist
- William Warfield (1920–2002), singer and movie actor
