= Helena–West Helena, Arkansas =

City in Arkansas, United States

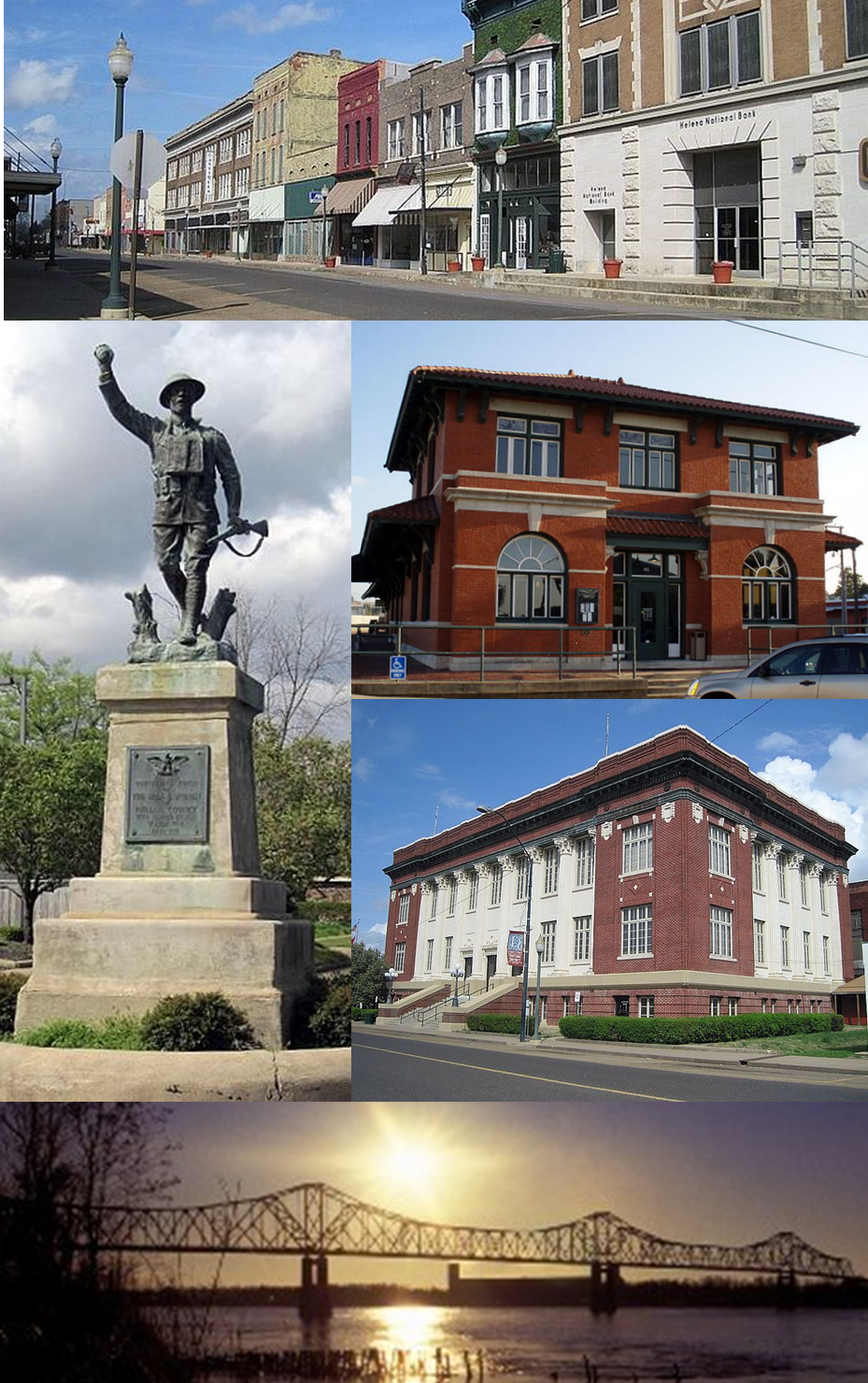
- Clockwise from top: Cherry Street Historic District, the Delta Cultural Center, Phillips County Courthouse, the Helena Bridge over the Mississippi River and the Spirit of the American Doughboy Monument

- Seal

- Location of Helena-West Helena in Phillips County, Arkansas.

- Location within Arkansas Location within the United States
- Coordinates: 34°31′45″N 90°37′24″W
- Country: United States
- State: Arkansas
- County: Phillips
- Helena founded: 1833
- West Helena founded: 1926
- Founded: 2006
- Incorporated: 2006
- Named for: Helena Phillips

Government
  - Mayor: Joseph Whitfield

Area
  - Total: 13.09 sq mi (33.91 km^{2})
  - Land: 13.09 sq mi (33.91 km^{2})
  - Water: 0 sq mi (0.00 km^{2})
- Elevation: 331 ft (101 m)

Population (2020)
  - Total: 9,519
  - Estimate (2025): 8,216 ▼
  - Density: 727/sq mi (280.7/km^{2})
- Time zone: UTC-6 (CST)
  - Summer (DST): UTC-5 (CDT)
- ZIP code(s): 72342, 72390
- FIPS code: 05-31190
- GNIS feature ID: 2404679
- Website: hwh.ar.gov

Helena–West Helena (/ˈhɛlənə/) is the county seat of and the largest city within Phillips County, Arkansas, United States. The current city was consolidated, effective January 1, 2006, from the two Arkansas cities of Helena and West Helena. Helena is sited on lowlands between the Mississippi River and the eastern side of Crowley's Ridge. West Helena is located on the western side of Crowley's Ridge, a geographic anomaly in the typically flat Arkansas Delta. The Helena Bridge, one of Arkansas's four Mississippi River bridges, carries U.S. Route 49 across to Mississippi. The combined population of the two cities was 15,012 at the 2000 census and at the 2010 census, the official population was 12,282.

The municipality traces its historical roots to the founding of the port town of Helena on the Mississippi River by European Americans in 1833. As the county seat, Helena was the center of a prosperous cotton plantation region in the antebellum years. Helena was occupied by the Union Army early in the American Civil War. The city was the site of the Battle of Helena fought in 1863. Confederate forces unsuccessfully tried to expel Union forces from Helena in order to help relieve pressure on the strategic river town of Vicksburg, Mississippi. Later in the year, Helena served as the launching point for the Union Army in the capture of Little Rock, the state capital.

A thriving blues community developed here in the 1940s and 1950s as rural musicians relocated for city jobs. Mechanization had reduced the need for farm workers. The city continued to grow until the closing of the Mohawk Rubber Company, a subsidiary of Yokohama Rubber Company, in the 1970s. Unemployment surged shortly after.

Among the attractions in Helena–West Helena are the Delta Cultural Center, the Pillow-Thompson House (owned and operated by the Phillips Community College of the University of Arkansas), and the Helena Confederate Cemetery, which holds the remains of seven Confederate Army generals. The city holds an annual King Biscuit Blues Festival each October. It has been held under this name since 2010, when it was renamed at a 25th-anniversary performance by musician B.B. King.

== History ==
The area comprising modern downtown Helena, next to the Mississippi River, was originally part of a land speculation deal between Sylvanus Phillips (the county's namesake) and St. Louis businessman William Russell in around 1815. Phillips had lived in the area as early as 1797, and moved to the area of Helena following a brief stint at Arkansas Post in 1799. The land was formally platted by New York surveyor Nicholas Rightor in 1820, and by 1833, the city of Helena was founded. Local legend holds that the town was named are the deceased daughter of Sylvanus.

Like other river towns in the Arkansas Delta (such at Hopefield, Osceola, and Napoleon) Helena became known as a place that attracted thieves, gamblers, and other outlaws who inhabited frontier America. In 1834, British geologist George William Featherstonhaugh was appointed by the War Department to make a geological survey of the state of Arkansas. Before the trip, while stopping in Bolivar, TN, Featherstonhaugh was warned against going to Helena, it being described by the locals as "a sink of crime and infamy."

In 1835, citizens in Helena responded to the growing lawlessness by forming an anti-gambling and temperance societies to improve the town's image, one of the more notable leaders of this movement was local lawyer (and future Confederate General) Thomas Hindman. By the mid-1850s, much of the rough edges of the river town had disappeared. By then, Helena had three newspapers, six private schools, at least a dozen churches, several subscription libraries, and an occasional public lecture.

The steamboat General Brown exploded at the wharf boat at Helena on November 25, 1838. The Phillips County Historical Quarterly states about the event: Suddenly the boat's three boilers let go with such force, more than half of her upper structure was torn to splinters. The captain, still grasping the rope, was blown overboard, together with a portion of the woodwork on which he stood. Dr. Price fell to the lower deck and died in flames which destroyed all that was left of the steamer. Captain Robert McConnell of Paducah, who was clerk on her, was blown into the river, but being uninjured, managed to get to the shore. Although many passengers and members of the crew were injured or killed by the explosion and fire, the few who leaped overboard were drowned."

During the Civil War, the Union Army occupied Helena prior to the Battle of Helena in 1863. In the early morning hours of July 4, 1863, Confederate forces attempted to retake Helena in order to help relieve pressure on the strategic river town of Vicksburg, Mississippi. Confederate forces in Vicksburg had already arranged to surrender to General U.S. Grant on the morning of July 4. Many of the former battle sites are still intact. Helena may benefit from developing and protecting these historic areas for destination tourism.

On September 26, 1866, a portion of the eastern end of the city of Helena collapsed into the Mississippi River due to river erosion. The majority of this was the land at the intersection of Main Street (now Cherry Street) and Elm Street. Multiple building were lost in the event, which was later known as "The Cave-in of '66."

In Spring 1897, a major flood damaged the town. City leaders decided to sacrifice the northern end of the city to try to save the central and lower sections. On May 27, the levee on the north side of the city was cut to relieve pressure on the lower parts of the levee. There was also a break in the levee at the Modoc community, further south of Helena. The water crested at 51.75 ft. on April 4. It was reported in the local papers that the water on Cherry Street was at least three feet underwater.

In the early part of the 20th century several business leaders began developing property west of Crowley's Ridge. City leaders acquired 2,300 acres three miles northwest of Helena, and worked to lay out a street grid and run an interurban trolley line through the hills to connect the land to Helena. The land survey was completed on March 28, 1910; from its beginning, West Helena was deliberately segregated, with separate housing areas for white and black residents. On May 23, 1917, the new city was officially incorporated as West Helena.

18-year-old William Turner was lynched in Helena, Phillips County, Arkansas on November 18, 1921. He was shot dead, dragged to the little city park, doused with gasoline and set on fire.

Prior to consolidation in 2006, Helena contained 6,323 people within 23.1 km^{2}. Neighboring West Helena had 8,689 people in 11.5 km^{2}. Merger proposals began as early as 2002, and a March 2005 vote among citizens of both cities approved the merger. The surrounding rural county is one of the poorest of Arkansas' 75 counties. Proponents of the consolidation said that combining the cities would strengthen their bargaining power for the surrounding region in competing for projects to improve the overall economy and standard of living.

On June 25, 2023, a water main at the Helena-West Helena Municipal Water Department failed. This led to water shortages throughout the city.

=== Musical history ===
In the 1940s and 1950s, Helena attracted Black Americans from rural Arkansas and the Mississippi Delta seeking employment. Some also worked full-time as musicians. By the mid-twentieth century, Helena was 70% black, and juke joints employed such blues pianist as Sunnyland Slim, Memphis Slim and Roosevelt Sykes.

In November 1941, a white businessman put together the staff for the town's first radio station KFFA. A group of blues musicians were given a one-hour radio spot on the condition that they gain a sponsor, which ended up being King Biscuit Flour. This resulted in the creation of The King Biscuit Entertainers, as well as the show King Biscuit Time, which featured blues musicians.

The King Biscuit Blues Festival was organized in the late twentieth century as an annual October event. It was renamed the Arkansas Blues and Heritage Festival in 2005, and is one of the largest blues festivals in the world. The celebration is held in downtown Helena on Cherry Street in early October. The festival was again renamed in 2010, becoming the King Biscuit Blues Festival during the 25th anniversary performance of renowned musician B.B. King.

The lyrics of "Stand Up Guy" by Mark Knopfler make reference to West Helena.

== Geography ==
=== Climate ===
Climate data for Helena, Arkansas (1991–2020)
Month	Jan	Feb	Mar	Apr	May	Jun	Jul	Aug	Sep	Oct	Nov	Dec	Year
Mean daily maximum °F (°C)	49.3 (9.6)	54.3 (12.4)	63.1 (17.3)	72.6 (22.6)	80.9 (27.2)	88.1 (31.2)	90.4 (32.4)	90.1 (32.3)	84.9 (29.4)	74.4 (23.6)	61.5 (16.4)	52.3 (11.3)	71.8 (22.1)
Daily mean °F (°C)	40.7 (4.8)	44.5 (6.9)	53.1 (11.7)	62.3 (16.8)	71.2 (21.8)	78.9 (26.1)	81.6 (27.6)	80.9 (27.2)	74.9 (23.8)	63.5 (17.5)	51.8 (11.0)	43.5 (6.4)	62.2 (16.8)
Mean daily minimum °F (°C)	32.2 (0.1)	34.7 (1.5)	43.1 (6.2)	52.0 (11.1)	61.5 (16.4)	69.6 (20.9)	72.7 (22.6)	71.7 (22.1)	64.9 (18.3)	52.5 (11.4)	42.1 (5.6)	34.7 (1.5)	52.6 (11.5)
Average precipitation inches (mm)	4.63 (118)	4.20 (107)	5.03 (128)	5.66 (144)	4.89 (124)	3.48 (88)	3.41 (87)	2.80 (71)	2.63 (67)	3.46 (88)	4.43 (113)	5.12 (130)	49.74 (1,265)
Average snowfall inches (cm)	0.2 (0.51)	0.0 (0.0)	0.0 (0.0)	0.0 (0.0)	0.0 (0.0)	0.0 (0.0)	0.0 (0.0)	0.0 (0.0)	0.0 (0.0)	0.0 (0.0)	0.0 (0.0)	0.1 (0.25)	0.3 (0.76)
Source: NOAA

== Demographics ==
Historical population
Census	Pop.	Note	%±
1850	614		—
1860	1,551		152.6%
1870	2,249		45.0%
1880	3,652		62.4%
1890	5,189		42.1%
1900	5,552		7.0%
1910	8,772		58.0%
1920	9,112		3.9%
1930	8,316		−8.7%
1940	8,546		2.8%
1950	11,236		31.5%
1960	11,500		2.3%
1970	10,415		−9.4%
1980	9,598		−7.8%
1990	7,491		−22.0%
2000	6,323		−15.6%
2010	12,282		94.2%
2020	9,519		−22.5%
2025 (est.)	8,216	▼	−13.7%
U.S. Decennial Census; Data is for the city of Helena alone prior to 2010

Helena–West Helena first appeared in the 2010 U.S. census after the consolidation of the city of Helena with West Helena.

=== Racial and ethnic composition ===
Helena–West Helena city, Arkansas – Racial and ethnic composition Note: the US Census treats Hispanic/Latino as an ethnic category. This table excludes Latinos from the racial categories and assigns them to a separate category. Hispanics/Latinos may be of any race.
Race / Ethnicity (NH = Non-Hispanic)	Pop 2010	Pop 2020	% 2010	% 2020
White alone (NH)	2,892	1,946	23.55%	20.44%
Black or African American alone (NH)	9,105	7,204	74.13%	75.68%
Native American or Alaska Native alone (NH)	26	18	0.21%	0.19%
Asian alone (NH)	43	35	0.35%	0.37%
Native Hawaiian or Pacific Islander alone (NH)	1	4	0.01%	0.04%
Other race alone (NH)	1	12	0.01%	0.13%
Mixed race or Multiracial (NH)	69	174	0.56%	1.83%
Hispanic or Latino (any race)	145	126	1.18%	1.32%
Total	12,282	9,519	100.00%	100.00%

=== 2020 census ===
As of the 2020 United States census, there were 9,519 people, 4,191 households, and 2,515 families residing in the city.

=== 2000 census ===
Based on U.S. Census reports for both cities prior to the merger, the 2000 population of the area comprising Helena–West Helena was 15,012. There were 5,516 households, and 3,765 families residing in the city. The racial makeup of the city was 66.63% African American, 31.85% White, 0.19% Native American, 0.47% Asian, 0.01% Pacific Islander, 0.27% from other races, and 0.58% from two or more races. Hispanics or Latinos of any race were 0.89% of the population.

The median income for a household in the city was $19,896, and the median income for a family was $23,274. Males had a median income of $25,087 versus $17,238 for females. The per capita income for the city was $12,131.

Aerial view of downtown Helena, 2026

Barges traveling north on the Mississippi River pass the Helena river park

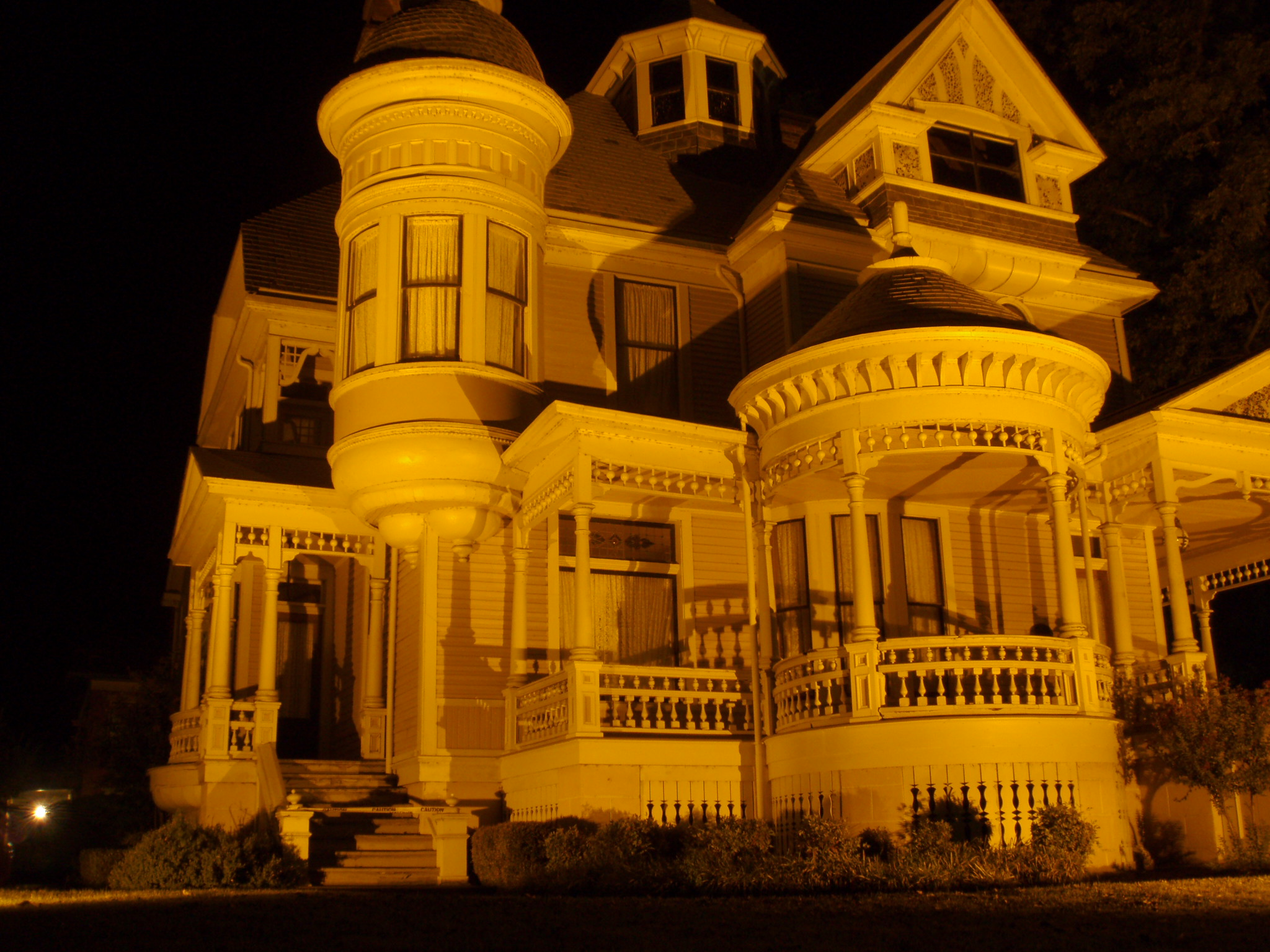
The Pillow Thompson House in Helena. An example of Queen Anne-style architecture

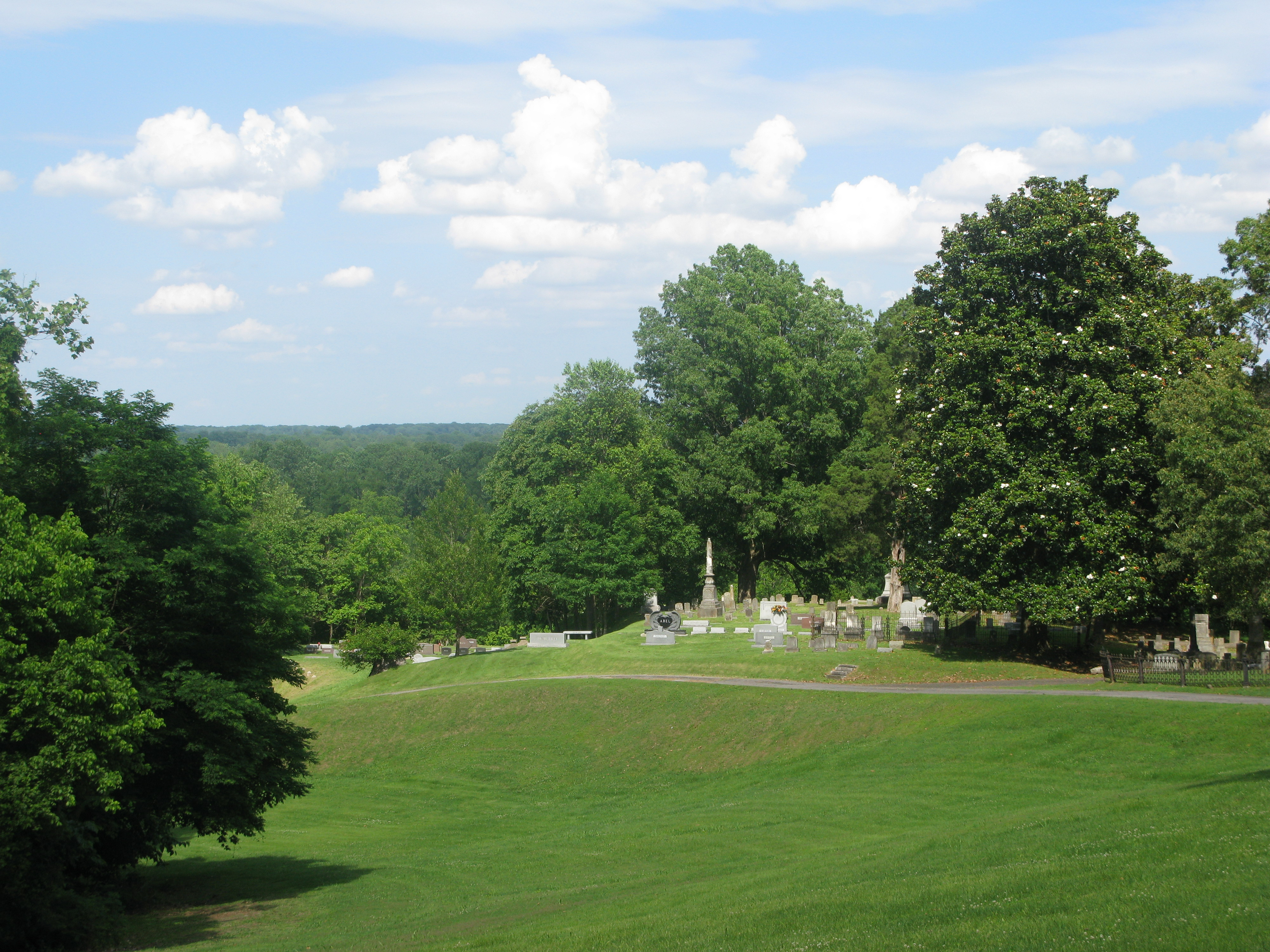
The view from the Helena, Arkansas Confederate Cemetery of the area of the Battle of Helena

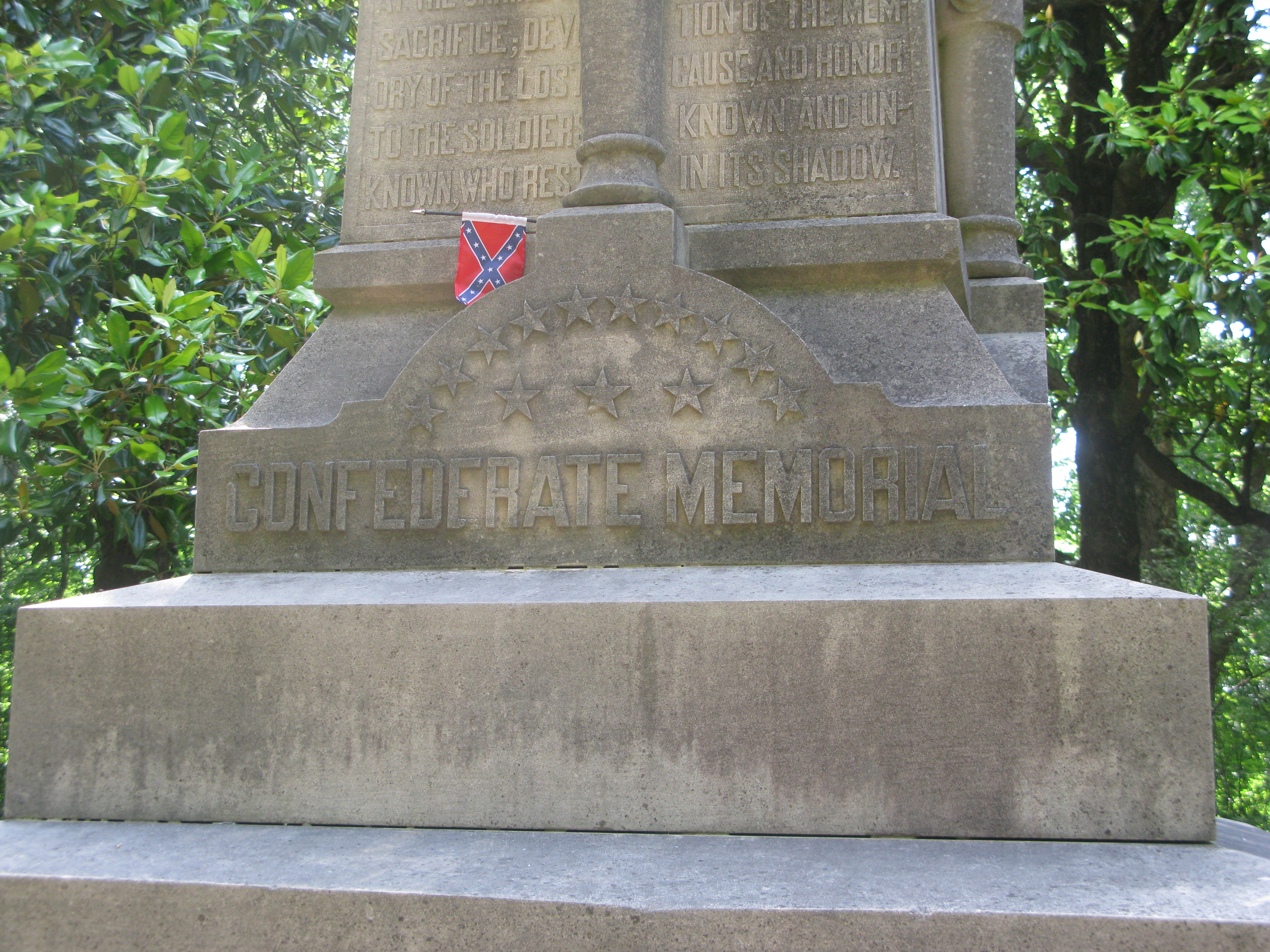
The historical Confederate graveyard placard from the Battle of Helena

As of the census of 2000, there were 6,323 people, 2,312 households, and 1,542 families residing in the city of Helena. The population density was 710.7 inhabitants per square mile (274.4/km^{2}). There were 2,710 housing units at an average density of 304.6 per square mile (117.6/km^{2}). The racial makeup of the city was 67.93% Black or African American, 30.59% White, 0.13% Native American, 0.60% Asian, 0.17% from other races, and 0.59% from two or more races. Hispanic or Latino of any race were 0.73% of the population.

There were 2,312 households, out of which 32.7% had children under the age of 18 living with them, 33.8% were married couples living together, 28.5% had a female householder with no husband present, and 33.3% were non-families. 30.0% of all households were made up of individuals, and 13.4% had someone living alone who was 65 years of age or older. The average household size was 2.62 and the average family size was 3.28.

In the city, the population was spread out, with 32.5% under the age of 18, 10.0% from 18 to 24, 22.1% from 25 to 44, 20.0% from 45 to 64, and 15.5% who were 65 years of age or older. The median age was 32 years. For every 100 females there were 83.3 males. For every 100 females age 18 and over, there were 75.5 males.

The median income for a household in the city was $18,662, and the median income for a family was $21,534. Males had a median income of $27,203 versus $17,250 for females. The per capita income for the city was $13,028. About 38.4% of families and 41.4% of the population were below the poverty line, including 54.9% of those under age 18 and 24.1% of those age 65 or over.

=== West Helena ===
As of the census of 2000, there were 8,689 people, 3,204 households, and 2,223 families residing in the city of West Helena. The population density was 1,956.6 inhabitants per square mile (755.4/km^{2}). There were 3,518 housing units at an average density of 792.2 per square mile (305.9/km^{2}). The racial makeup of the city was 65.69% Black or African American, 32.77% White, 0.23% Native American, 0.38% Asian, 0.02% Pacific Islander, 0.33% from other races, and 0.58% from two or more races. Hispanic or Latino of any race were 1.01% of the population.

There were 3,204 households, out of which 36.0% had children under the age of 18 living with them, 36.8% were married couples living together, 29.2% had a female householder with no husband present, and 30.6% were non-families. 27.6% of all households were made up of individuals, and 11.5% had someone living alone who was 65 years of age or older. The average household size was 2.71 and the average family size was 3.32.

In the city, the population was spread out, with 34.1% under the age of 18, 10.1% from 18 to 24, 23.9% from 25 to 44, 19.6% from 45 to 64, and 12.3% who were 65 years of age or older. The median age was 30 years. For every 100 females there were 80.7 males. For every 100 females age 18 and over, there were 71.5 males.

The median income for a household in the city was $21,130, and the median income for a family was $25,014. Males had a median income of $22,971 versus $17,225 for females. The per capita income for the city was $11,234. About 30.9% of families and 35.4% of the population were below the poverty line, including 49.5% of those under age 18 and 27.2% of those age 65 or over.

== Economy ==
With a median income of $19,896 for a household, the city is one of the poorest in the nation. One potential advance for the combined city, as reported by the Arkansas Democrat-Gazette on July 12, 2006, is an ethanol fuel refinery to be built by Las Vegas-based E-Fuels. Whether the consolidation had any bearing on the decision is not certain. If the project is developed, it is expected to bring several new jobs and a significant increase in traffic to the region's port on the Mississippi River.

In 2006, the city announced plans to reopen the regional landfill, from which Helena–West Helena could earn fees.

Helena–West Helena's chief economic base continues to be agriculture, specifically cotton cultivation. Mechanization and large industrial farms have reduced the need for farm labor since the first half of the 20th century. Barge traffic at the city's port on the Mississippi River is another source of jobs and revenues, in addition to retail and tourism.

== Cultural institutions ==
- Delta Cultural Center
- Helena Museum of Phillips County
- Phillips County Library
- Lily Peter Auditorium (Phillips Community College of the University of Arkansas)

== Media ==
The Helena-West Helena World is the local newspaper.

== Education ==
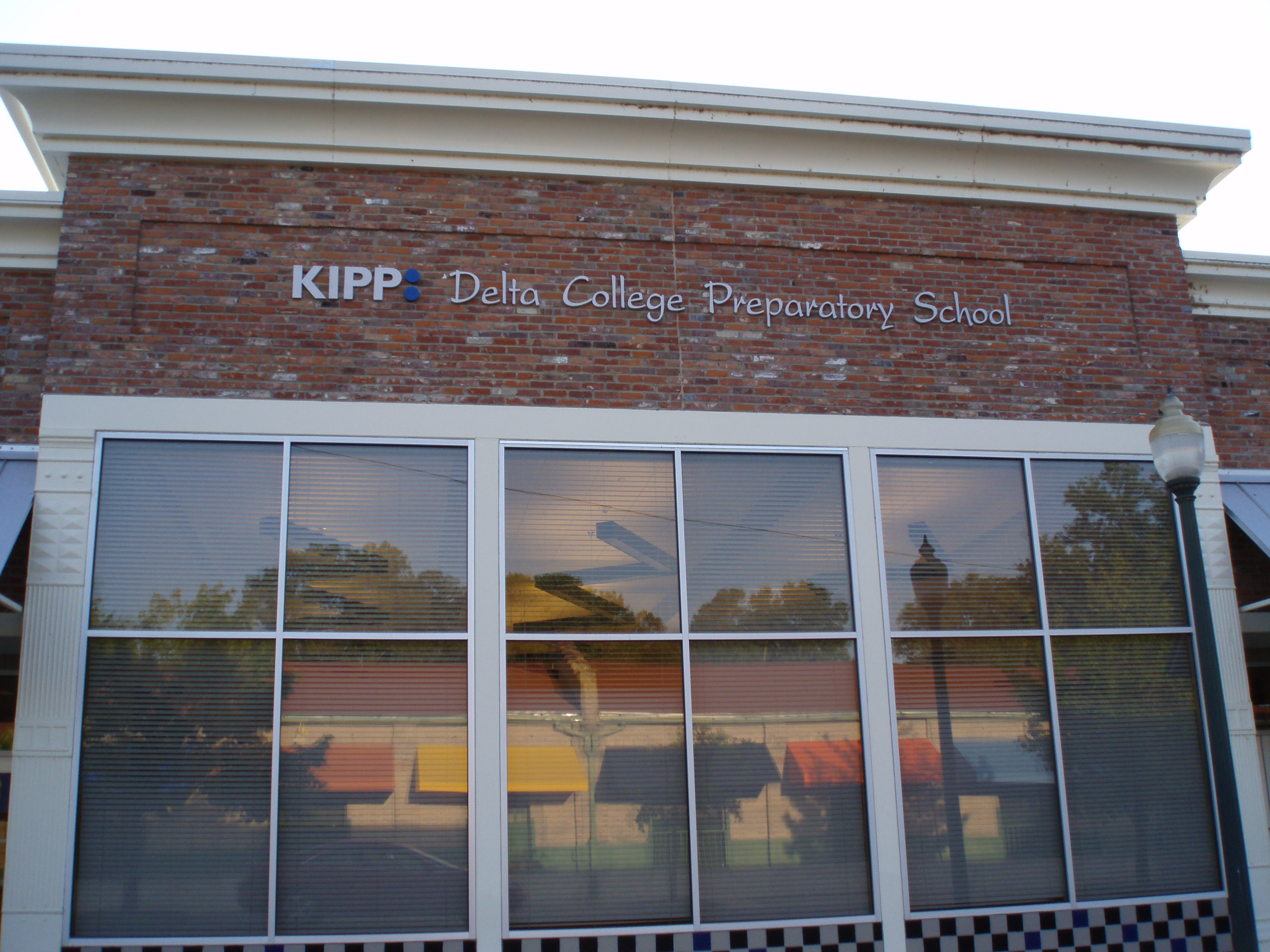
KIPP Delta College Prep School in Downtown Helena

Higher education

- Phillips Community College of the University of Arkansas

Public education

The Helena–West Helena School District operates public schools.

- Central High School - Grades 7–12 high school, located in West Helena.
- J.F. Wahl Elementary School - Grades K–6 elementary school, located in Helena.

KIPP: Delta Public Schools operates a group of charter schools in the municipality.

- KIPP: Elementary Literacy Academy (grades K–4)
- KIPP: Delta College Preparatory School (grades 5–8)
- KIPP: Delta Collegiate High School (grades 9–12)

Private education

- DeSoto School (K through 12).

Former Schools

- St. Catherine's Academy (grades 1–12) - St. Mary's Catholic Church in Helena previously had a day school and convent opened in 1857 known as St. Catherine's Academy established by the Sisters of Mercy. It closed in 1868. A new convent and school opened as Sacred Heart Academy by the Sisters of Charity in 1879 which housed the sisters and served to educate all Catholic children grades 1-12 for free, while admitting a very few non-Catholic children whose parents paid tuition to the parish. Sacred Heart remained open into the late 1960s when the church moved the school to a building located next to the newer church building and rented out Sacred Heart to the Helena-West Helena Public Schools Distract. By the mid-1970s, the Sacred Heart building was condemned and vacated. The Historic Preservation Society attempted to raise finds to restore Sacred Heart but were unsuccessful. The building was demolished in the mid-1970s, but grades 1–6, housed in Catholic Hall, remained open as St. Mary's Elementary School into at least the early 1980s. A young Elvis Presley was forcefully ejected by the parish priest from the church/school's auditorium (also called "The Catholic Club") in 1955, after a performance at the club hall. Allegedly, the priest had caught Presley signing the thigh of a teenage girl.
- Eliza Miller School (grades 1–12) - A Rosenwald School funded in part by local businesswoman Eliza Ann Ross Miller. The school closed in the 1970s, after the Helena School System was desegregated. Notable acts to perform at this school were the Staple Singers and B.B. King.

== Notable people ==
- John Hanks Alexander - second African-American West Point graduate
- Fred Childress - all-star football player in Canadian Football League
- Patrick Cleburne - Confederate Civil War general
- Ken Hatfield - college football coach at Clemson, Air Force, Arkansas, and Rice
- Levon Helm - musician, member of The Band
- Alex Johnson, Major League Baseball player
- Mary Lambert, music video director
- Blanche Lincoln, U.S. senator from Arkansas
- Robert Lockwood, Jr., blues musician and stepson of Robert Johnson
- Robert Lee McCollum, blues musician
- Elias Camp Morris, minister, politician, and businessman who pastored Centennial Baptist Church
- John Stroger, Jr., longtime president of the Board of Commissioners of Cook County, Illinois
- Roosevelt Sykes - blues pianist
- Conway Twitty (born Harold Lloyd Jenkins), country music star who grew up in Helena.
- Ellis Valentine - former Major League Baseball player
- Sonny Boy Williamson II, blues musician
- Richard Wright, author of fiction and autobiography
