= William Nicholas Straub House =

Historic house in Arkansas, United States

- U.S. National Register of Historic Places
- U.S. Historic district – Contributing property
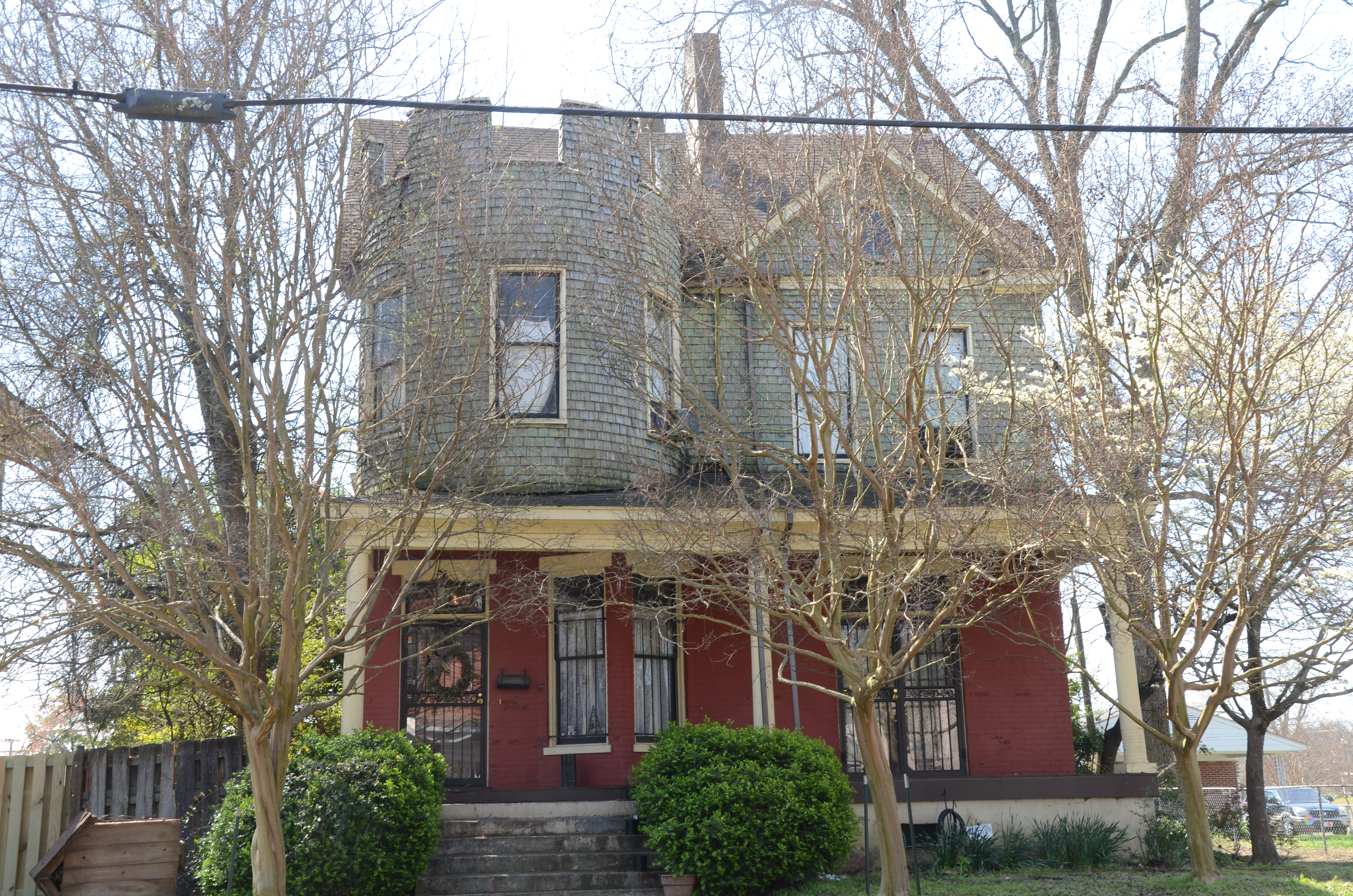

- Location within Arkansas Location within the United States
- Location: 531 Perry St., Helena, Arkansas
- Coordinates: 34°31′37″N 90°35′31″W
- Area: less than one acre
- Built: 1900
- Architect: Lyle Brothers
- Part of: Perry Street Historic District (ID86002594)
- NRHP reference No.: 85000834

Significant dates
- Added to NRHP: April 18, 1985
- Designated CP: November 26, 1986

The William Nicholas Straub House is a historic house at 531 Perry Street in Helena, Arkansas. It is a stylistically eclectic 2 1/2-story structure, built in 1900 for William Nicholas Straub, a prominent local merchant. The house's main stylistic elements come from the Colonial Revival and the Shingle style, both of which were popular at the time. The house has a first floor finished in painted brick, and its upper floors are clad in shingles. The main facade has a single-story porch across its width, supported by three Ionic columns. The entrance, on the left side, has a single door with a large pane of glass, and is topped by a transom window. On the right side is a two-sided projecting bay section. The house's most prominent exterior feature is a crenellated tower which rises above the entry.

The house was listed on the National Register of Historic Places in 1985.

== See also ==
- National Register of Historic Places listings in Phillips County, Arkansas
