= Woodruff High School =

Woodruff High School may mean:

- Woodruff High School (Arkansas), a former high school in West Helena, Arkansas in Helena-West Helena School District
- E. N. Woodruff High School, a public high school in Peoria Public Schools District 150 in Peoria, Illinois, and referred to since 2011 by its school district as Woodruff Career and Technical Center
- Woodruff High School (South Carolina), a public school in Woodruff, South Carolina
- Arbor Vitae-Woodruff High School, a former high school in Woodruff, Wisconsin, that merged to form Lakeland Union High School in 1957
