= Helena, Arkansas =

City in Arkansas

- City
- Aerial view of Helena (2026)

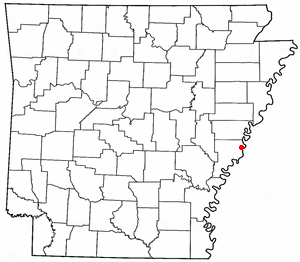
- Location of Helena, Arkansas
- Coordinates: 34°31′45″N 90°35′10″W
- Country: United States
- State: Arkansas
- County: Phillips
- Incorporated: November 16, 1833

Area
  - Total: 8.9 sq mi (23.0 km^{2})
  - Land: 8.9 sq mi (23.0 km^{2})
  - Water: 0 sq mi (0.0 km^{2})
- Elevation: 200 ft (61 m)

Population (2000)
  - Total: 6,323
  - Density: 712/sq mi (274.9/km^{2})
- Time zone: UTC-6 (Central (CST))
  - Summer (DST): UTC-5 (CDT)
- ZIP code: 72342
- Area code: 870
- FIPS code: 05-31180
- GNIS feature ID: 0077157

Helena is the eastern portion of Helena–West Helena, Arkansas, a city in Phillips County, Arkansas, United States, located on the west bank of the Mississippi River. It was founded in 1833 by Nicholas Rightor and is named after the daughter of Sylvanus Phillips, an early settler of Phillips County and the namesake of Phillips County. As of the 2000 census, this portion of the city population was 6,323. Helena was the county seat of Phillips County until January 1, 2006, when it merged its government and city limits with neighboring West Helena.

During the American Civil War, the Battle of Helena was fought July 4, 1863. Helena is the birthplace of many notable people including prominent African Americans and Arkansas' former senior United States senator, Blanche Lincoln. Helena is home to the longest running daily radio program in the U.S., King Biscuit Time.

Citizens of Helena incorporated the Arkansas Midland Railroad in 1853, intending it to be a fairly straight "air-line railroad" running west from Helena to Little Rock, Arkansas, about 115 miles. However actual trackage was not completed until 1872, and only ran to Clarendon, Arkansas, about 48 miles. This line later became part of the St. Louis, Iron Mountain and Southern Railway in 1910, but was all abandoned by 1979. From 1906 to 1946, Helena was a terminal point on the former Missouri and North Arkansas Railroad, which provided passenger and freight service to Joplin, Missouri. After a loss of rail service in early 2015, a successful effort was launched by the Helena-West Helena/Phillips County Port Authority to have freight service restored. The service was restored on October 1, 2015, and two new freight customers were quickly gained.

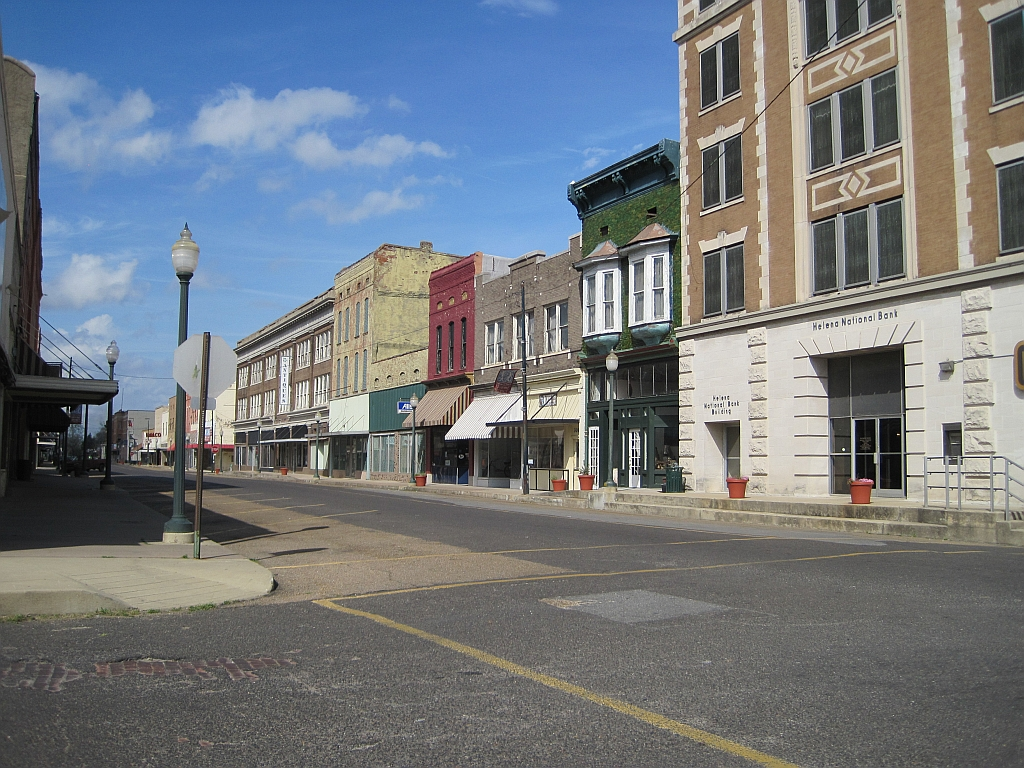
Downtown Helena

== History ==
Jean-Baptiste Le Moyne de Bienville, Governor of French Louisiana, built Fort St. Francis as a rendezvous point and supply depot for his 1738 campaign against the Chickasaws. The position proved vulnerable and was abandoned in favor of Fort Assumption, upriver on the fourth Chickasaw Bluff, at present day Memphis, TN. During Spanish rule in the late 1700s, a number of settlers came to what was then known as Prairie Point, forming a small community name Big Prairie, it was devastated by the New Madrid Earthquakes of 1811 and 1812.

Sylvanus Phillips and W.B.R. Hornor moved to St. Francis during the early years. Phillips had lived in the area as early as 1797, and moved to the area of St. Francis following a brief stint at Arkansas Post in 1799. The area comprising modern downtown Helena, next to the Mississippi River, was originally part of a land speculation deal between Sylvanus Phillips (the county's namesake) and St. Louis businessman William Russell in around 1815. The land was formally platted by New York surveyor Nicholas Rightor in 1820, and by 1833, the city of Helena was founded, and the name changed from St. Francis. Local legend holds that the town was named are the deceased daughter of Sylvanus.

In 1834, British geologist George William Featherstonhaugh was appointed by the War Department to make a geological survey of the state of Arkansas. Before the trip, while stopping in Bolivar, TN, Featherstonhaugh was warned against going to Helena, it being described by the locals as "a sink of crime and infamy."

The steamboat General Brown exploded at the wharf boat at Helena on November 25, 1838. The Phillips County Historical Quarterly states about the event: Suddenly the boat's three boilers let go with such force, more than half of her upper structure was torn to splinters. The captain, still grasping the rope, was blown overboard, together with a portion of the woodwork on which he stood. Dr. Price fell to the lower deck and died in flames which destroyed all that was left of the steamer. Captain Robert McConnell of Paducah, who was clerk on her, was blown into the river, but being uninjured, managed to get to the shore. Although many passengers and members of the crew were injured or killed by the explosion and fire, the few who leaped overboard were drowned."

On September 26, 1866, a portion of the eastern end of the city of Helena collapsed into the Mississippi River due to river erosion. The majority of this was the land at the intersection of Main Street (now Cherry Street) and Elm Street. Multiple building were lost in the event, which was later known as "The Cave-in of '66."

In Spring 1897, a major flood damaged the town. City leaders decided to sacrifice the northern end of the city to try to save the central and lower sections. On May 27, the levee on the north side of the city was cut to relieve pressure on the lower parts of the levee. There was also a break in the levee at the Modoc community, further south of Helena. The water crested at 51.75 ft. on April 4. It was reported in the local papers that the water on Cherry Street was at least three feet underwater.

The city consolidated with West Helena in 2006 to become the single city of Helena-West Helena, Arkansas

=== Battle of Helena ===
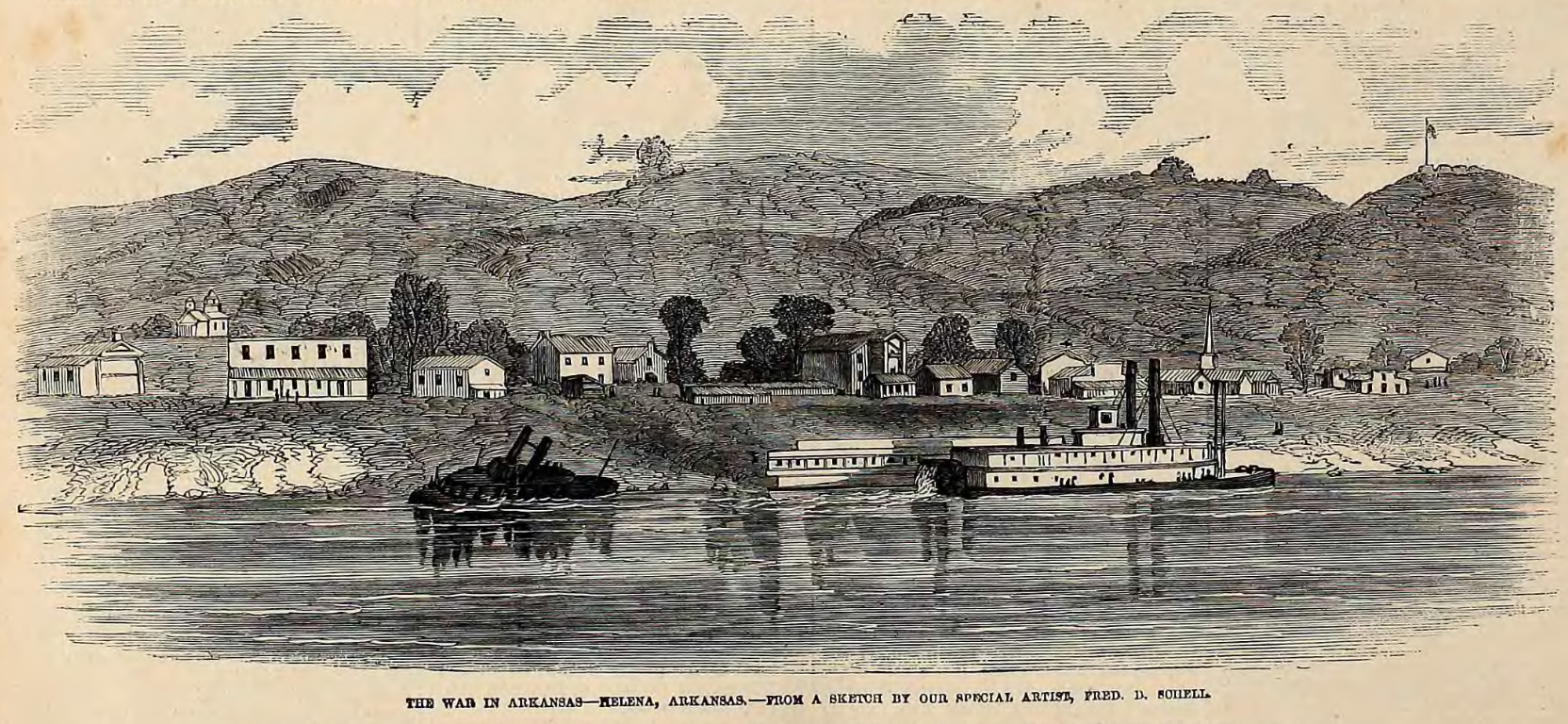
Helena, 1863

In June 1863, Confederate Commander Theophilus Holmes sought to take pressure off of Vicksburg, Mississippi, by attacking the Union-held town of Helena, Arkansas. Holmes planned and executed three different failed attacks on the town. The main attack broke through Battery C, but Union troops fended off the attackers and sealed the breach. The Battle of Helena began in the early morning hours of July 4, 1863. Confederate forces attempted to retake Helena in order to help relieve pressure on the strategic river town of Vicksburg, Mississippi. Confederate forces in Vicksburg had already arranged to surrender to General U.S. Grant on the morning of July 4. The Confederates at Helena withdrew by the end of the day on July 4, 1863. There were 1,636 Confederate casualties and 205 Union casualties. Many of the former battle sites are still intact.

=== Fort Curtis ===
Fort Curtis was built in August 1862 by Union soldiers and freed slaves in Helena. For the next year, it served as a command post for the Union since it was centrally located on the Mississippi River.

Fort Curtis was not directly attacked during the Battle of Helena as the Confederacy focused its attacks on the outlying batteries. The Confederates charged Fort Curtis in their last attack, but the heavy artillery inside kept the attack from reaching the fort.

Helena built a reproduction of Fort Curtis in 2012 that is free to the public.

=== Musical history ===
In the 1940s and 1950s, Helena attracted blacks from rural Arkansas and the Mississippi Delta, who came for the jobs. Some also worked full-time as musicians. By then Helena was 70% black, and juke joints employed such blues pianist as Sunnyland Slim, Memphis Slim and Roosevelt Sykes.

In November 1941, a white businessman put together the staff for the town's first radio station KFFA. A group of blues musicians were given a one-hour radio spot on the condition that they gain a sponsor. King Biscuit Flour agreed to do. The King Biscuit Entertainers were sponsored, as well as the show King Biscuit Time, featuring blues musicians.

The King Biscuit Blues Festival was organized in the late 20th century as an annual October event. It was renamed as the Arkansas Blues and Heritage Festival in 2005, and is one of the largest blues festivals in the world. The celebration is held in downtown Helena on Cherry Street in early October. It was renamed in 2010 as the King Biscuit Blues Festival at a 25th anniversary performance of renowned musician B.B. King.

The lyrics of "Stand Up Guy" by Mark Knopfler make reference to West Helena.

=== Connection with Helena, Montana ===
On October 30, 1864, a group of at least seven self-appointed men met to, among other things, name the town now called Helena, Montana. Eventually, a Scotsman, John Summerville, proposed Helena, which he pronounced /həˈliːnə/ hə-LEE-nə, in honor of Helena Township, Scott County, Minnesota. This immediately caused an uproar from the former Confederates in the room, who insisted upon the pronunciation /ˈhɛlɪnə/ HEL-i-nə, after Helena, Arkansas. While the name "Helena" won, the pronunciation varied until approximately 1882 when the /ˈhɛlɪnə/ HEL-i-nə pronunciation became dominant.

== Arts and culture ==
=== Blues ===
Robert Palmer noted that in the mid-1930s Helena was "the blues capital of the Delta". Among the musicians who regularly visited and performed in the area at that time were Robert Johnson, Johnny Shines, Sonny Boy Williamson II, Robert Nighthawk, Howlin' Wolf, Elmore James, David "Honeyboy" Edwards, Memphis Slim and Roosevelt Sykes.

=== Historic buildings ===
Helena, Arkansas is home to historic buildings such as the Sidney H. Horner House and the Centennial Baptist Church. The Edwardian Inn is located on land occupied by Union forces during the Siege of Vicksburg in 1863, and is listed in the National Register of Historic Places.

=== In fiction ===
The city features prominently in the novel The Pirates of the Mississippi by Friedrich Gerstäcker, published in 1848.

== Geography ==
Helena is located at 34°31′45″N 90°35′10″W (34.5292, -90.5861).

According to the United States Census Bureau, Helena had a total area of 8.9 sq mi (23 km^{2}), all land.

=== Climate ===
Climate data for Helena, Arkansas (1991–2020)
Month	Jan	Feb	Mar	Apr	May	Jun	Jul	Aug	Sep	Oct	Nov	Dec	Year
Mean daily maximum °F (°C)	49.3 (9.6)	54.3 (12.4)	63.1 (17.3)	72.6 (22.6)	80.9 (27.2)	88.1 (31.2)	90.4 (32.4)	90.1 (32.3)	84.9 (29.4)	74.4 (23.6)	61.5 (16.4)	52.3 (11.3)	71.8 (22.1)
Daily mean °F (°C)	40.7 (4.8)	44.5 (6.9)	53.1 (11.7)	62.3 (16.8)	71.2 (21.8)	78.9 (26.1)	81.6 (27.6)	80.9 (27.2)	74.9 (23.8)	63.5 (17.5)	51.8 (11.0)	43.5 (6.4)	62.2 (16.8)
Mean daily minimum °F (°C)	32.2 (0.1)	34.7 (1.5)	43.1 (6.2)	52.0 (11.1)	61.5 (16.4)	69.6 (20.9)	72.7 (22.6)	71.7 (22.1)	64.9 (18.3)	52.5 (11.4)	42.1 (5.6)	34.7 (1.5)	52.6 (11.5)
Average precipitation inches (mm)	4.63 (118)	4.20 (107)	5.03 (128)	5.66 (144)	4.89 (124)	3.48 (88)	3.41 (87)	2.80 (71)	2.63 (67)	3.46 (88)	4.43 (113)	5.12 (130)	49.74 (1,265)
Average snowfall inches (cm)	0.2 (0.51)	0.0 (0.0)	0.0 (0.0)	0.0 (0.0)	0.0 (0.0)	0.0 (0.0)	0.0 (0.0)	0.0 (0.0)	0.0 (0.0)	0.0 (0.0)	0.0 (0.0)	0.1 (0.25)	0.3 (0.76)
Source: NOAA

== Demographics ==
Historical population
Census	Pop.	Note	%±
1850	614		—
1860	1,551		152.6%
1870	2,249		45.0%
1880	3,652		62.4%
1890	5,189		42.1%
1900	5,550		7.0%
1910	8,772		58.1%
1920	9,112		3.9%
1930	8,316		−8.7%
1940	8,546		2.8%
1950	11,236		31.5%
1960	11,500		2.3%
1970	10,415		−9.4%
1980	9,598		−7.8%
1990	7,491		−22.0%
2000	6,323		−15.6%
U.S. Decennial Census

Helena city, Arkansas – Racial and ethnic composition Note: the US Census treats Hispanic/Latino as an ethnic category. This table excludes Latinos from the racial categories and assigns them to a separate category. Hispanics/Latinos may be of any race.
Race / Ethnicity (NH = Non-Hispanic)	Pop 2000	% 2000
White alone (NH)	1,921	30.38%
Black or African American alone (NH)	4,269	67.52%
Native American or Alaska Native alone (NH)	8	0.13%
Asian alone (NH)	38	0.60%
Native Hawaiian or Pacific Islander alone (NH)	0	0.00%
Other race alone (NH)	8	0.13%
Mixed race or Multiracial (NH)	33	0.52%
Hispanic or Latino (any race)	46	0.73%
Total	6,323	100.00%

=== 2000 census ===
As of the census of 2000, there were 6,323 people, 2,312 households, and 1,542 families residing in Helena. The population density was 710.7 inhabitants per square mile (274.4/km^{2}). There were 2,710 housing units at an average density of 304.6 per square mile (117.6/km^{2}). The racial makeup of Helena is 67.93% Black or African American, 30.59% White, 0.13% Native American, 0.60% Asian, 0.17% from other races, and 0.59% from two or more races. 0.73% of the population were Hispanic or Latino of any race.

There were 2,312 households, out of which 32.7% had children under the age of 18 living with them, 33.8% were married couples living together, 28.5% had a female householder with no husband present, and 33.3% were non-families. 30.0% of all households were made up of individuals, and 13.4% had someone living alone who was 65 years of age or older. The average household size was 2.62 and the average family size was 3.28.

In Helena, the age distribution included 32.5% of the population under the age of 18, 10.0% from 18 to 24, 22.1% from 25 to 44, 20.0% from 45 to 64, and 15.5% who were 65 years of age or older. The median age was 32 years. For every 100 females, there were 83.3 males. For every 100 females age 18 and over, there were 75.5 males.

The median income for a household in Helena is $18,662, and the median income for a family was $21,534. Males had a median income of $27,203 versus $17,250 for females. The per capita income for Helena is $13,028. About 38.4% of families and 41.4% of the population were below the poverty line, including 54.9% of those under age 18 and 24.1% of those age 65 or over.

== Economy ==
With a median income of $19,896 for a household, the city is one of the poorest in the nation. One potential advance for the combined city, as reported by the Arkansas Democrat-Gazette on July 12, 2006, is an ethanol fuel refinery to be built by Las Vegas-based E-Fuels. Whether the consolidation had any bearing on the decision is not certain. If the project is developed, it is expected to bring several new jobs and a significant increase in traffic to the region's port on the Mississippi River.

In 2006, the city announced plans to reopen the regional landfill, from which Helena–West Helena could earn fees.

Helena–West Helena's chief economic base continues to be agriculture, specifically cotton cultivation. Mechanization and large industrial farms have reduced the need for farm labor since the first half of the 20th century. Barge traffic at the city's port on the Mississippi River is another source of jobs and revenues, in addition to retail and tourism.

== Education ==
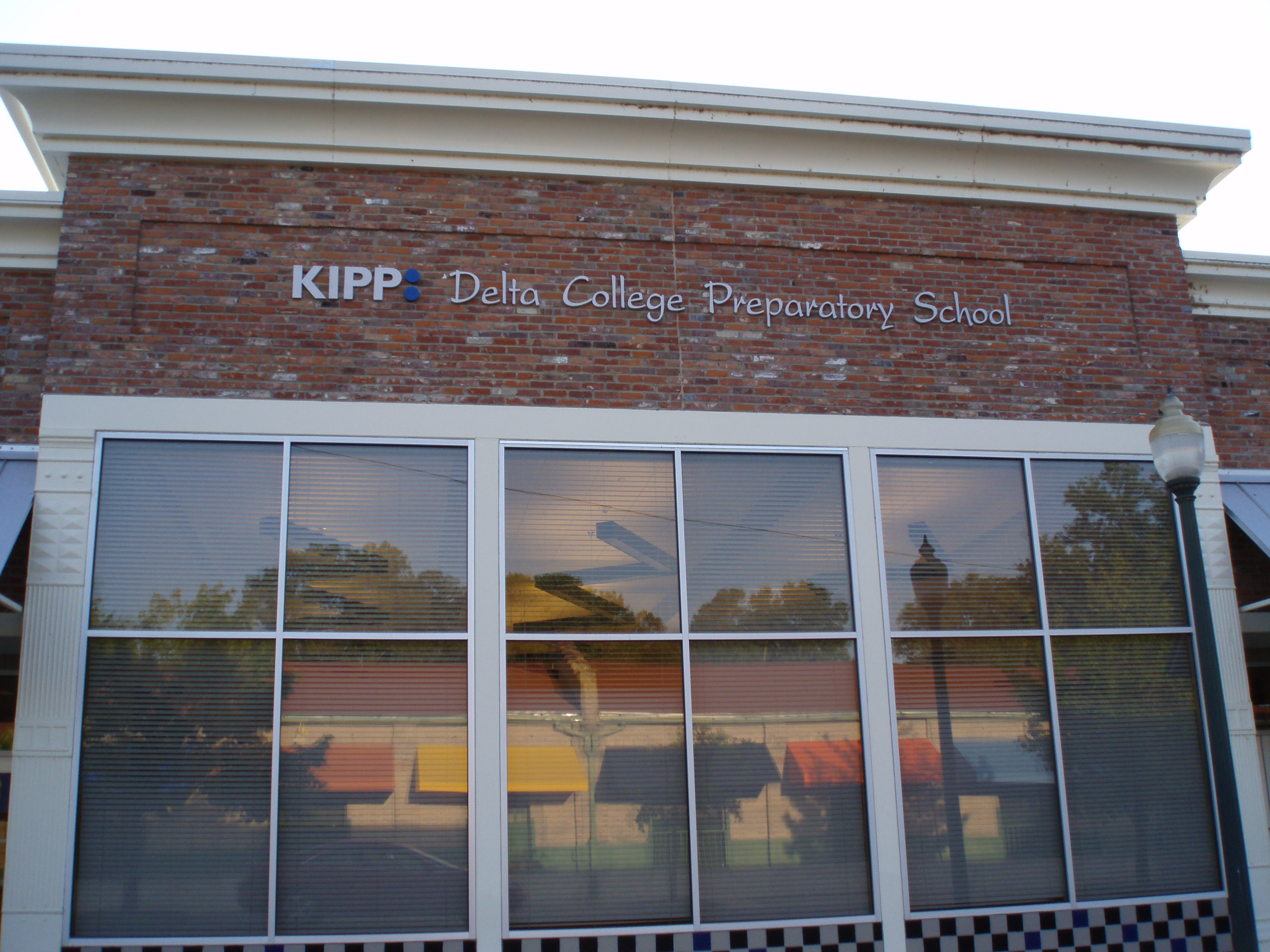
KIPP Delta College Prep School in Downtown Helena

Higher education

- Phillips Community College of the University of Arkansas

Public education

The Helena–West Helena School District operates public schools.

- Central High School - Grades 7–12 high school, located in West Helena.
- J.F. Wahl Elementary School - Grades K–6 elementary school, located in Helena.

KIPP: Delta Public Schools operates a group of charter schools in the municipality.

- KIPP: Elementary Literacy Academy (grades K–4)
- KIPP: Delta College Preparatory School (grades 5–8)
- KIPP: Delta Collegiate High School (grades 9–12)

Private education

- DeSoto School (K through 12).

Former Schools

- St. Catherine's Academy (grades 1–12) - St. Mary's Catholic Church in Helena previously had a day school and convent opened in 1857 known as St. Catherine's Academy established by the Sisters of Mercy. It closed in 1868. A new convent and school opened as Sacred Heart Academy by the Sisters of Charity in 1879 which housed the sisters and served to educate all Catholic children grades 1-12 for free, while admitting a very few non-Catholic children whose parents paid tuition to the parish. Sacred Heart remained open into the late 1960s when the church moved the school to a building located next to the newer church building and rented out Sacred Heart to the Helena-West Helena Public Schools Distract. By the mid-70s the Sacred Heart building was condemned and vacated. The Historic Preservation Society attempted to raise finds to restore Sacred Heart but were unsuccessful. The building was demolished in the mid-1970s, but grades 1–6, housed in Catholic Hall, remained open as St. Mary's Elementary School into at least the early 80s. A young Elvis Presley was forcefully ejected by the parish priest from the church/school's auditorium (also called "The Catholic Club") in 1955, after a performance at the club hall. Allegedly, the priest had caught Presley signing the thigh of a teenage girl.
- Eliza Miller School (grades 1–12) - A Rosenwald School funded in part by local businesswoman Eliza Ann Ross Miller. The school closed in the 1970s, after the Helena School System was desegregated. Notable acts to perform at this school were the Staple Singers and B.B. King.
- St. Cyprian School - A Catholic grade school for the area's black children, it closed in 1963.

== Cultural Institutions ==
- Delta Cultural Center
- Helena Museum of Phillips County
- Phillips County Library
- Lily Peter Auditorium (Phillips Community College of the University of Arkansas)

== Notable people ==
- James M. Alexander, formerly enslaved African-American politician and businessperson; served in the Arkansas House of Representatives and as first African-American Justice of the Peace in Arkansas
- Joni Lee, singer
- John Hanks Alexander, first African American officer in U.S. armed forces to hold regular command position and second African American graduate of U.S. Military Academy
- Dorathy M. Allen, first woman elected to Arkansas Senate
- John Allin, presiding bishop of the Episcopal Church (United States)
- Bankroll Freddie, rapper
- Bruce Bennett, former Arkansas Attorney General
- Joseph Robert Booker, African-American civil rights leader
- Caroline Shawk Brooks, first known American sculptor to work with butter
- Fred Childress, all-star football player in Canadian Football League
- Patrick Cleburne, Confederate General
- CeDell Davis, blues guitarist and longtime recording artist despite disabled hands
- William Henry Grey, Reconstruction-era politician and state senator
- Thomas Burton Hanly, Arkansas judge and legislator
- Ken Hatfield, college football coach at Clemson, Air Force, Arkansas, and Rice
- Levon Helm, musician, member of The Band
- Thomas C. Hindman, Confederate General
- Red Holloway, jazz saxophonist
- Alex Johnson, baseball player, 1970 American League batting champion
- Mary Lambert, film director
- Blanche Lincoln, former U.S. Senator from Arkansas
- Robert Lockwood, Jr., blues musician and stepson of Robert Johnson
- Charlie Marr, football player and coach
- Roberta Martin, gospel singer
- Robert Lee McCollum, blues musician
- Theodore D. McNeal, union organizer, equal employment opportunity activist, and state senator in Missouri
- Abraham Hugo Miller, formerly enslaved African-American politician and businessperson; served in the Arkansas House of Representatives; minister of Centennial Baptist Church.
- Elias Camp Morris, pastor of Centennial Baptist Church and president of the National Baptist Convention
- James Sallis, fiction writer, poet and essayist
- John Stroger, Jr., longtime president of the Board of Commissioners of Cook County, Illinois
- Roosevelt Sykes, blues pianist
- Johnny Taylor, painter
- Conway Twitty, country singer and actor in Country Music Hall of Fame
- Ellis Valentine, former right fielder for the Montreal Expos and the New York Mets.
- James T. White, Reconstruction-era politician and Baptist minister
- Sonny Boy Williamson II, blues musician
- Richard Wright, author of fiction and autobiography
