= Perry Street Historic District (Helena–West Helena, Arkansas) =

Historic district in Arkansas, United States

- U.S. National Register of Historic Places
- U.S. Historic district
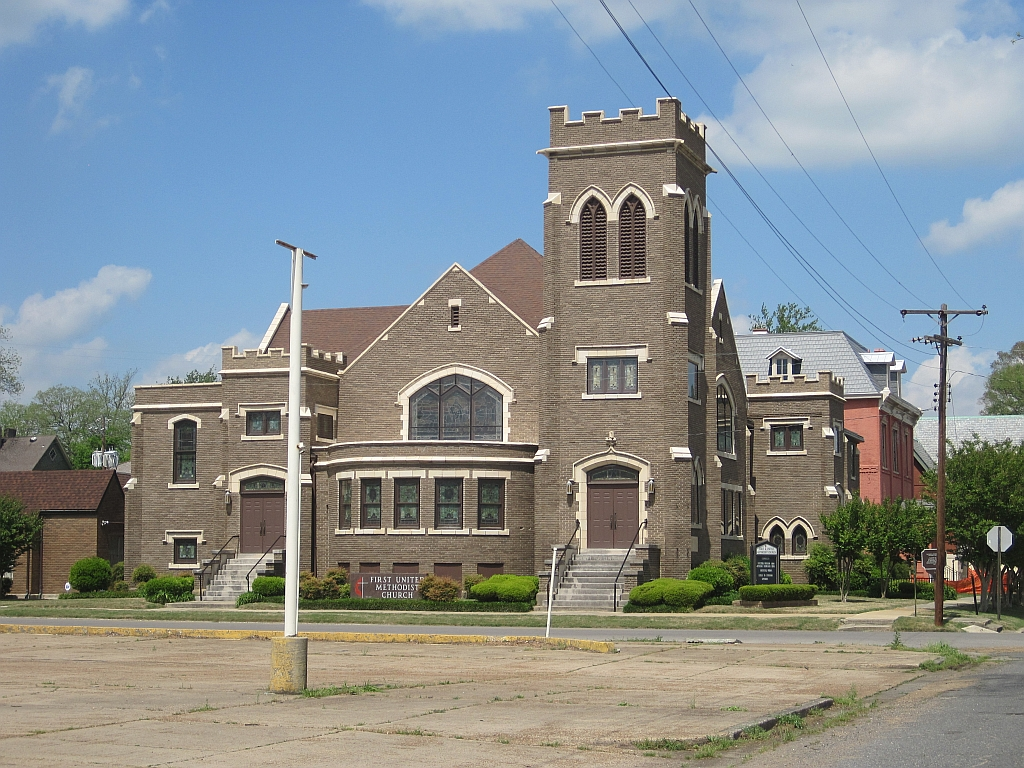
- The First United Methodist Church

- Location within Arkansas Location within the United States
- Location: Perry St. between Pecan and Franklin and Pecan St. from Porter to Perry, Helena–West Helena, Arkansas
- Coordinates: 34°31′43″N 90°35′21″W
- Area: 5 acres (2.0 ha)
- Architectural style: Colonial Revival, Bungalow/Craftsman
- NRHP reference No.: 86002954
- Added to NRHP: November 26, 1986

The Perry Street Historic District encompasses a fine collection of early-20th century architecture in Helena–West Helena, Arkansas. It includes fifteen buildings, arrayed on the single city blocks stretching south and west from the junction of Perry and Pecan Streets. The buildings on these blocks represent a cross-section of private and public architecture spanning 1880–1930, including two churches, the only synagogue in Phillips County (the 1913 Temple Bethel), and the county's oldest public building, the 1879 Helena Library and Museum. Most of the residences in the district were built between 1900 and the 1920s. Although most of the residential architecture is Arts and Crafts in style, it includes two fine Queen Anne Victorians: the Moore House at 608 Perry (built 1900) and the William Nicholas Straub House at 531 Perry (also built 1900).

The district was listed on the National Register of Historic Places (NRHP) in 1986.

== See also ==
- National Register of Historic Places listings in Phillips County, Arkansas
