= Theodore McNeal =

American politician from Missouri (1905–1982)

- McNeal in October 1960

Member of the Missouri Senate from the 7th district
- In office 1960–1970

Personal details
- Born: November 5, 1905 Helena, Arkansas, U.S.
- Died: October 25, 1982 (aged 76) St. Louis, Missouri
- Party: Democratic
- Occupation: Union organizer, employment opportunity activist, politician

Theodore D. McNeal (November 5, 1905 – October 25, 1982) was a union organizer, employment opportunity activist, and state legislator in Missouri. He was the first African American to serve in the Missouri Senate.

He was born in Helena, Arkansas and grew up there before settling in St. Louis after high school.

In 1930, McNeal joined the International Brotherhood of Sleeping Car Porters. In 1942, McNeal and attorney David M. Grant founded the St. Louis branch of the March on Washington Movement (MOWM). After years of working as a union organizer, in 1950 he became president of the organization.

In 1960 he defeated incumbent state senator Ernest J. Hogan in the Democratic Party primary and won election to the Missouri Senate. He served for 10 years, helping pass landmark civil rights legislation for fairer employment practices.

He served as Curator of the University of Missouri from 1970 to 1973, and in 1973 began serving as president of the Saint Louis Police Board. Furthermore, he also was the first African-American non-alumnus trustee of Washington University in St. Louis.

McNeal's daughter, Betty McNeal Wheeler, was founding principal of Metro Academic and Classical High School.
