= The Helena-West Helena World =

The Helena World
- Type: Weekly newspaper
- Founded: 1871; 154 years ago
- Headquarters: 17, York Street, Helena, AR
- Website: helenaworld.org

The Helena World is a weekly newspaper based in Helena-West Helena, Arkansas, which serves Phillips County. It is published on Wednesdays in print but has a website, www.helenaworld.org, which is updated daily.

== History ==
The publication was founded in 1871. The paper's owner Gatehouse Media closed the paper on Sept. 6, 2019, but then sold it that same day to businessmen Andrew Bagley and Chuck Davis. At the time The World had 625 subscribers.

In 2022, the paper's owners purchased the assets of Hayden Taylor Publishing, which published the Monroe County Herald. The paper's name was then changed to the Monroe County Argus. Two years later they purchased the Waldron News and the Mansfield Citizen.
