= James M. Alexander =

American politician (1815–1871)

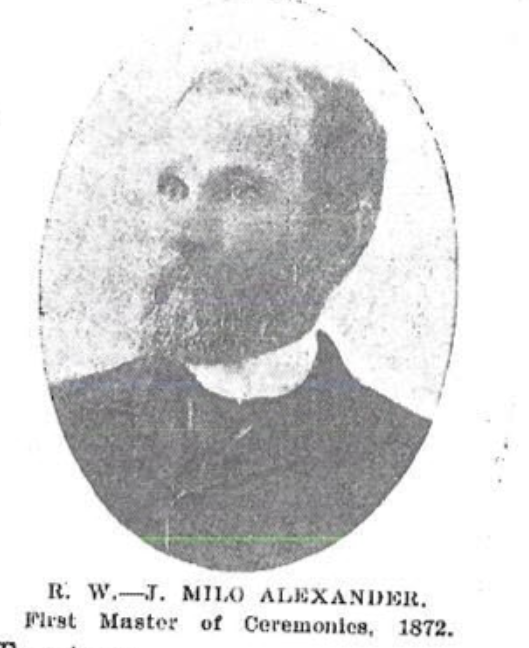

Member of the Arkansas House of Representatives from the 11th district
- In office 1871–1871

Personal details
- Born: February 17, 1815 North Carolina, U.S.
- Died: May 21, 1871 (aged 56) Little Rock, Arkansas, U.S.
- Party: Republican
- Spouse: Francis Ellen Miller Alexander (1826-1909)
- Children: John Hanks Alexander

James Milo Alexander (February 7, 1815 – May 27, 1871) was an African-American businessperson and politician in Phillips County, Arkansas. Alexander was a successful businessperson and the first African-American justice of the peace in Arkansas.

Born into slavery in North Carolina, his enslaver taught him how to read and write. After moving to Arkansas, which was then a frontier region, Alexander's master allowed him to establish his own business, a barbershop. Though his business prospered and grew to include the sale of dry goods, he remained in bondage until purchasing his freedom and that of several family members in 1860.

== Political career ==
After the war, Alexander was active in Republican politics and served in a number of political offices in Helena, Arkansas including as postmaster, school trustee, grand jury member, and as a representative to the Arkansas House of Representatives, serving in the 11th District, which at that time was composed of Phillips and Monroe Counties. Alexander was an outspoken supporter of Powell Clayton. He voted to elevate Clayton to the Senate. He was also an active member of Prince Hall Freemasonry through the Most Worshipful Prince Hall Grand Lodge of Arkansas. The first African American masonic lodge in the state was named in his honor.

== Family ==
Five of his seven children attended Oberlin College in Ohio. His fourth child, John Hanks Alexander (1864 – 1894) was the first African-American officer in the United States armed forces to hold a regular command position and the second African-American graduate of the United States Military Academy. Another son, Titus Nathanial Alexander, was a political organizer in California in the 1920s who helped convince African-Americans to support the Democratic Party through the National Negro Democratic Congress.

== See also ==
- List of African-American officeholders during Reconstruction
