= Johnny Taylor (painter) =

American painter (born 1971)

- Born: 1971 (age 54–55)
- Known for: Painter
- Website: https://www.johnnytaylorart.com/

Johnny Taylor is an American painter born in 1971 in Helena, Arkansas. He received his BFA in Art History from the University of Memphis in 1996.

== Overview ==
Taylor paints bright colored acrylic and mixed media paintings of the memories of the heroes and the pop art/graffiti/kitsch that make up America. Johnny's work is influenced by the American humor magazine Mad and the hard rock band Kiss. He uses oil, spray paint, screen printing, and stencils on canvas or wood.

=== Solo exhibitions ===
2018	CODA Gallery, CA
2009	FLEA Store, Los Angeles, USA
2008	Everything in the world has changed, Yard Dog Gallery, Marfa, USA
2007	Twenty Seven, Jay Etkin Gallery, Memphis, USA
	Arts at the Airport, Nashville International Airport, Nashville, USA
2006	Present Perfect, Vue Gallery, Memphis, USA
2005	Texas Medicine, Jay Etkin Gallery, Memphis, USA

=== Group exhibitions ===
2018	Wish I Might, Parlor Gallery, Ashbury Park, NJ
2012	Urban Discovery, Artspace Warehouse, Los Angeles, USA
	Aerial, Jules Place, Boston, USA
2011	Local Color, Parlor Gallery, Asbury Park, USA
	LA-Zurich, Kunstwarenhaus, Zurich, Switzerland
	Atomic Vision, Tria Gallery, New York, USA
	COLORS, Artspace Warehouse, Los Angeles, USA
	Everything But the Kitschen Sync, La Luz de Jesus Gallery, Los Angeles, USA
2010	Made Out of Beautiful (Pop/UnPop), Parlor Gallery, Asbury Park, USA
2009	Little Exaltations, Deffebach Gallery, Hudson, USA
2008	Art Outside 2008, Enchanted Forest, Austin, USA
	Pop Art Now, Matrix Fine Art, Albuquerque, USA
