= Delta Cultural Center =

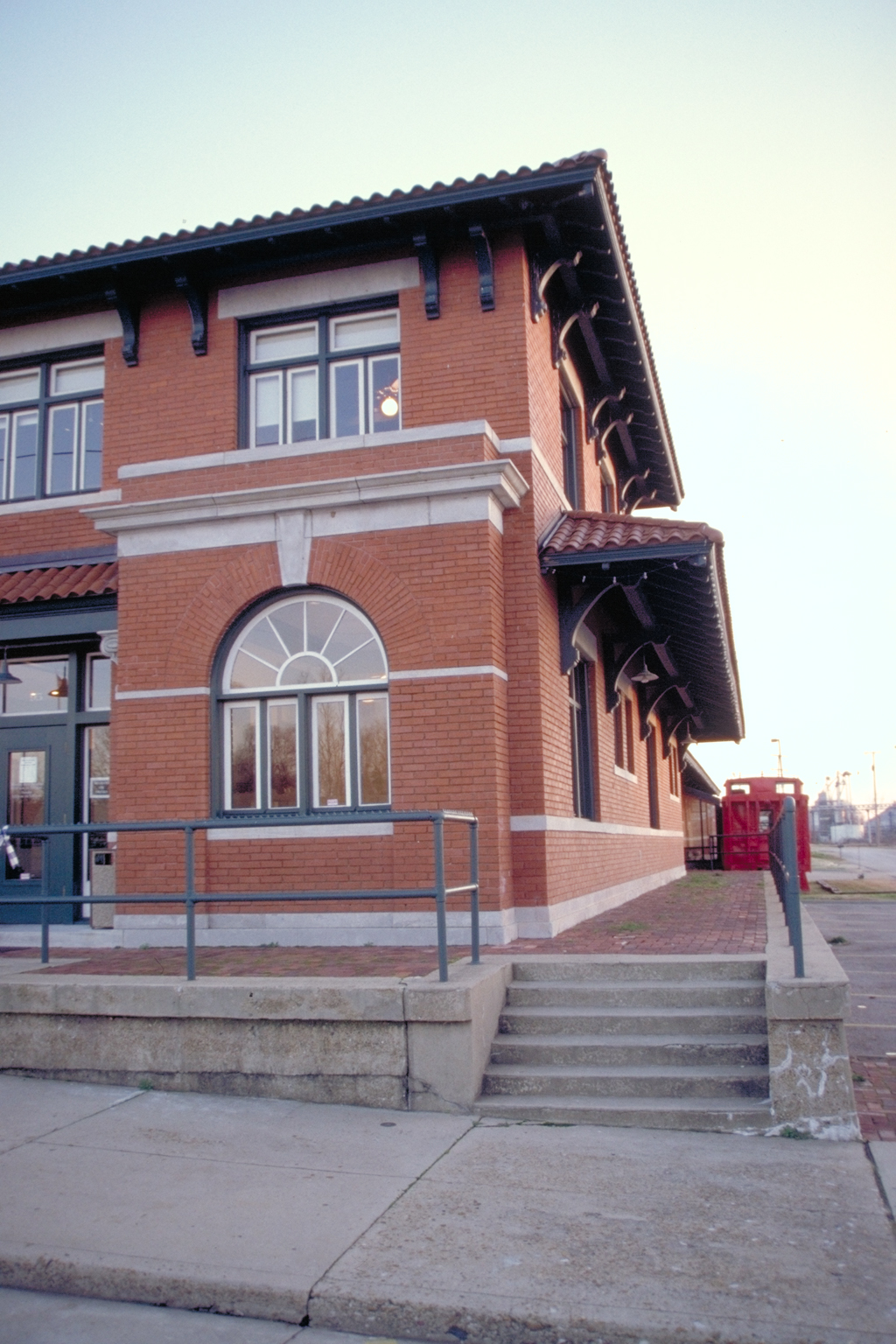
- Helena Depot, main site of the museum
- Established: 1990
- Location: Natchez and Missouri Sts., Helena, Arkansas
- Coordinates: 34°31′19″N 90°35′9″W
- Type: History museum
- Website: www.deltaculturalcenter.com
- Helena Depot
- U.S. National Register of Historic Places
- Built: 1915
- Architectural style: Bungalow/craftsman
- NRHP reference No.: 87000877
- Added to NRHP: November 5, 1987

The Delta Cultural Center in downtown Helena, Arkansas, is a cultural center and museum of the Department of Arkansas Heritage. It is dedicated to preserving and interpreting the culture of the Arkansas Delta. They also partner with other cultural organizations to interpret different cultural elements.

== Buildings ==
The centre opened in 1990, originally located in just one building, the Train Depot, expanding further over time. The center now consists of three buildings.

=== Visitors Centre ===
The Visitors Centre houses an interactive exhibition of Delta music including the King Biscuit Blues Festival and the broadcast facilities for King Biscuit Time which is the longest running blues radio program in the nation.

=== The Train Depot ===
The Train Depot is a former Union Pacific station, at Natchez and Missouri Street, houses exhibits on the American Civil War in Helena including the 1863 Battle of Helena, Union occupation of the area, slave experiences, and women in Civil War Helena. The Train Depot also has exhibits on the history of the Mississippi River including the Great Mississippi Flood of 1927 and exhibits on Delta agriculture and Native American history. This c. 1915 Craftsman/Classical Revival building is listed on the National Register of Historic Places.

=== The Moore-Hornor House ===
The Moore-Hornor House is located at 323 Beech Street, and is a red brick Greek Revival/Italianate-style home built in 1859, and is also listed on the National Register. The back yard of the home saw fierce hand-to-hand fighting during the Battle of Helena in the Civil War.

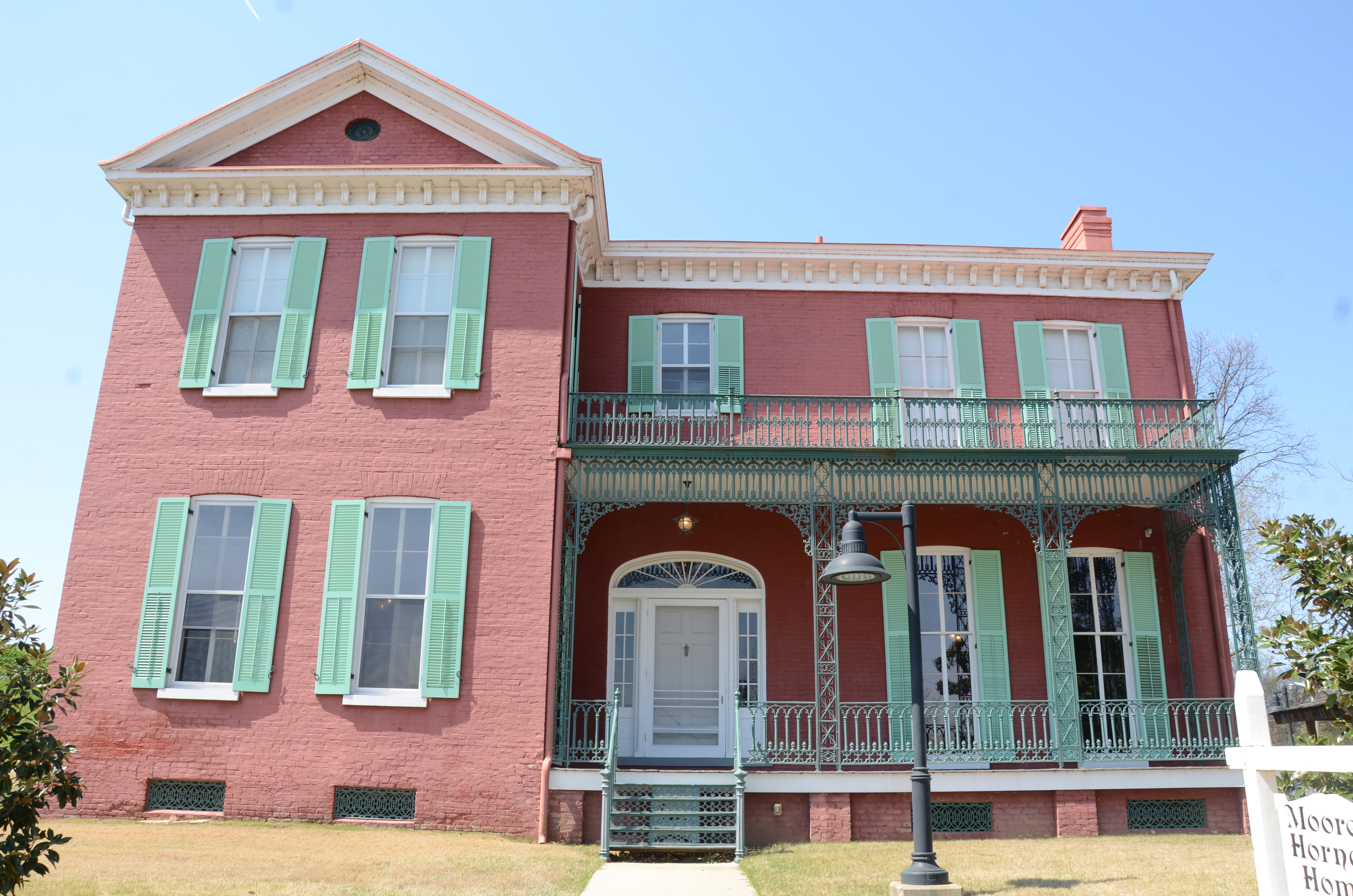
Moore-Hornor House

== See also ==
- National Register of Historic Places listings in Phillips County, Arkansas
- List of music museums

Preceding station	Missouri Pacific Railroad	Following station
Latour toward Wynne	Wynne - Helena	Terminus
