= Helena Library and Museum =

Helena Museum of Phillips County
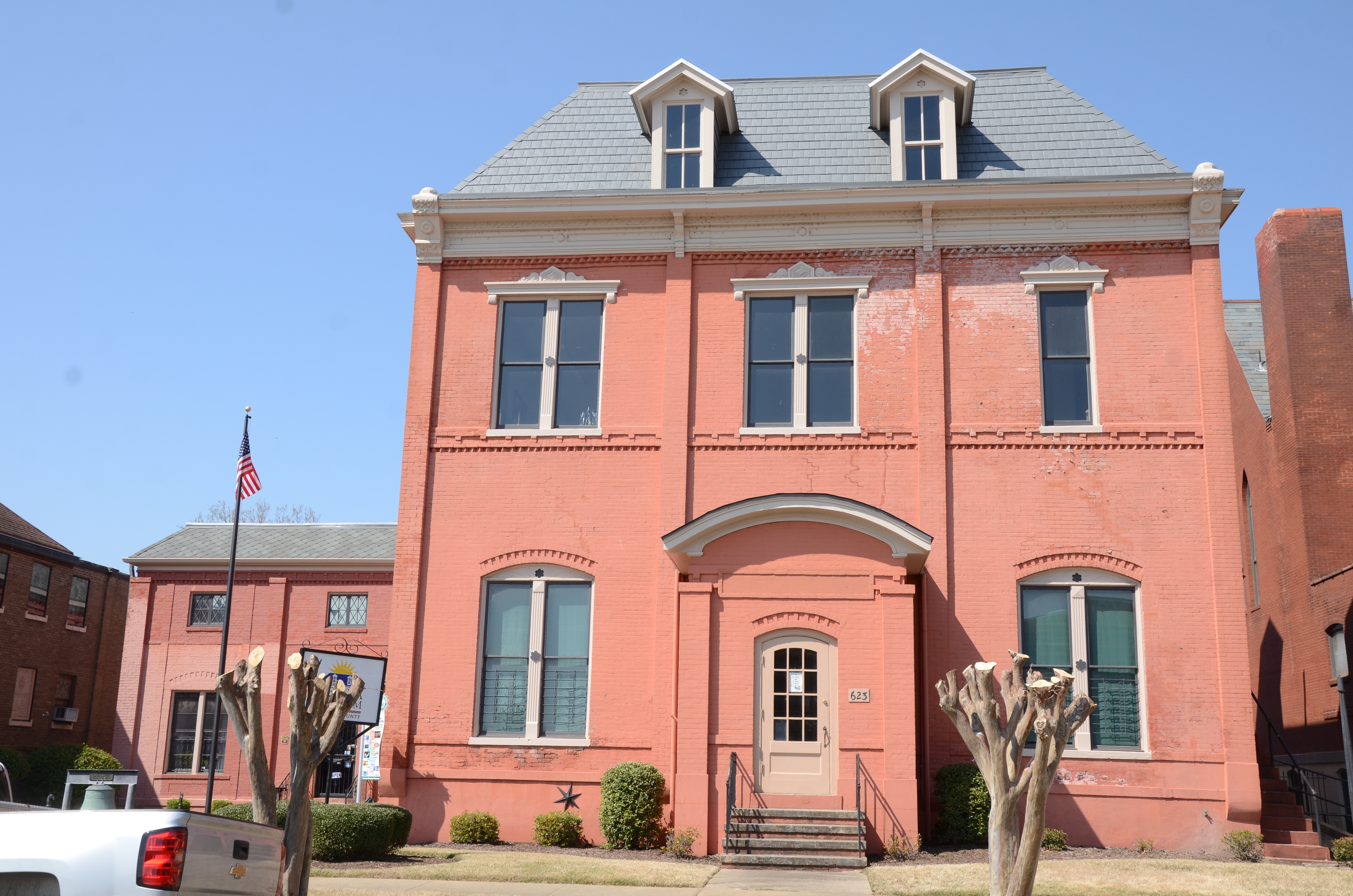
- Former name: Phillips County Library and Museum
- Established: 1891
- Location: 623 Pecan St., Helena, Arkansas
- Coordinates: 34°31′42″N 90°35′19″W
- Type: History museum
- Architect: Library: George R. Mann (1856-1939) Museum: Andrew Pomeroy Coolidge (1875-1934)
- Website: helenamuseum.com
- Helena Library and Museum
- U.S. National Register of Historic Places
- U.S. Historic district – Contributing property
- Area: less than one acre
- Built: 1890
- Built by: Raenhart & Simon (library)
- Part of: Perry Street Historic District (ID86002594)
- NRHP reference No.: 75000400

Significant dates
- Added to NRHP: December 6, 1975
- Designated CP: November 26, 1986

The Helena Library and Museum (now called the Helena Museum of Phillips County) is a historic building at 623 Pecan Street in Helena, Arkansas. Originally constructed in 1889 by the Women's Library Association to house a library for the city of Helena, it has also housed the county library, regional library and the county's museum.

== Building history and description ==
The main portion of the building is a 2 1/2-story mansard-roofed Second Empire structure, and was constructed between 1889 and 1891. The local fraternal organizations (The Royal Arcanum, American Legion of Honor, B’Nai Brith, York Rite Masons, Golden Rule, Knights of Honor, Knights and Ladies of Honor, Reynold Lodge No. 7, Knights of Pythias, Junior Lodge No. 15, & Ancient Order of United Workmen) worked with the Women's Library Association to raise funds to purchase the property and start construction. While it is currently the only Second-Empire style building in the county, it was originally designed to match other buildings in the town, according to local lore, the building was constructed to match the other two schools in Helena at the time, which were both built in that style. It is Helena's oldest civic building, and was used not just to house the library, but also as a social venue until about 1914, when its main space was fully devoted to the library. In 1929 a 1 1/2-story wing was added to rear to serve as a space for museum exhibits on local history. The building first opened to the public on September 11, 1891. Originally, the library only occupied a small room on the first floor. The largest rooms were reserved for meetings and fundraisers to help pay down the cost of construction. This continued until 1914, when the Women's Library Association had fully paid off the construction debt. They then moved the book collection into the first floor's main hall.

The building was listed on the National Register of Historic Places in 1975.

== Phillips County Museum ==
The Women's Library Association undertook a project to construct the first art and museum gallery hall in the state of Arkansas in 1916. By April, 1930, they had constructed a 1 1/2 story addition to the library building to house and display their sizable collection. They used local architect Andrew Coolidge, who had also designed the Jewish country club and multiple commercial buildings in Helena. The interior of this space is dominated by a large wrap around walkway.

== Collections ==
The museum has one of the oldest and varied collections in Arkansas. Some highlights include a letter signed by the Marquis de Lafayette, the first board cut from the Chicago Lumber Mill in West Helena in 1920, a ceramic gravy boat salvaged from a riverboat that exploded 1831, a masthead off of a Spanish imperial warship that was sunk in the Battle of Manila, the Phillips Guards Confederate Battle Flag, and the city of Helena's original 1820 plat map.

The museum also has a sizable collection of Native American Mississippian culture pottery. The majority was collected by locals in the southern end of the county, with a few being donated by the first president of the Women's Library Association and noted Arkansas ornithologist, Louis McGowan Stephenson.

In 1976, the museum partnered with the Charles Edison Fund to bring a collection of artifacts from Thomas Edison's laboratory to display in the museum's main gallery.

== See also ==
- National Register of Historic Places listings in Phillips County, Arkansas
