= Central High School (Helena–West Helena, Arkansas) =

Location
- 103 School Road; Helena–West Helena, Arkansas; United States; 34°32′29″N 90°37′42″W

Information
- Status: Open
- School district: Helena–West Helena School District
- NCES District ID: 0507680
- CEEB code: 041075
- NCES School ID: 050768000476
- Teaching staff: 54.08 (on FTE basis)
- Grades: 9–12
- Enrollment: 436f (2023–2024)
- Education system: Smart Core curriculum
- Classes offered: Regular, Advanced Placement (AP)
- Colors: Royal blue and scarlet red
- Athletics: Football, Volleyball, Basketball, Baseball, Softball, Track
- Athletics conference: 5A Central (2012–14)
- Mascot: Cougar
- Team name: Helena–West Helena Cougars
- Accreditation: ADE
- Affiliation: Arkansas Activities Association (AAA)
- Website: www.hwhschools.org/page/central-high-school

Central High School is a comprehensive public high school for students in grades seven through twelve in Helena–West Helena, Arkansas, United States. It is one of four public high schools in Phillips County and the sole high school administered by the Helena–West Helena School District.

It is located in the Mildand Heights neighborhood, which is situated halfway between the former cities of Helena and West Helena, which merged in 2014.

== Curriculum ==
The assumed course of study follows the Smart Core curriculum developed by the Arkansas Department of Education (ADE), which requires students to complete 25 units prior to graduation. Students complete regular coursework and exams and may select Advanced Placement (AP) courses and exams with the opportunity for college credit.

For 2010–11, Central High School's accreditation status is on probation with ADE.

== Athletics ==
The Helena–West Helena Central mascot is the cougar with the school colors of Royal blue and Scarlet red.

The Central Cougars participate in interscholastic athletic activities in the 5A Classification—the state's third largest classification—within the 5A Central Conference administered by the Arkansas Activities Association. The Cougars field competitive teams in football, volleyball, basketball (boys/girls), baseball, softball, and track and field (boys/girls), each with support from the cheer squad and the band

- Volleyball: The Lady Cougars volleyball squads are 4-time state volleyball champions (1978, 1980, 1983, 1984).

== Notable alumni ==
- Blanche Lincoln (ca. 1978)—Former U.S. Senator from Arkansas and a member of the Democratic Party.
- Brian Stacy Miller (1985)—Federal judge of U.S. District Court for the Eastern District of Arkansas
- Conway Twitty (1953)— Singer, Songwriter
