= John Hanks Alexander =

Groundbreaking African-American military officer (1864 – 1894)

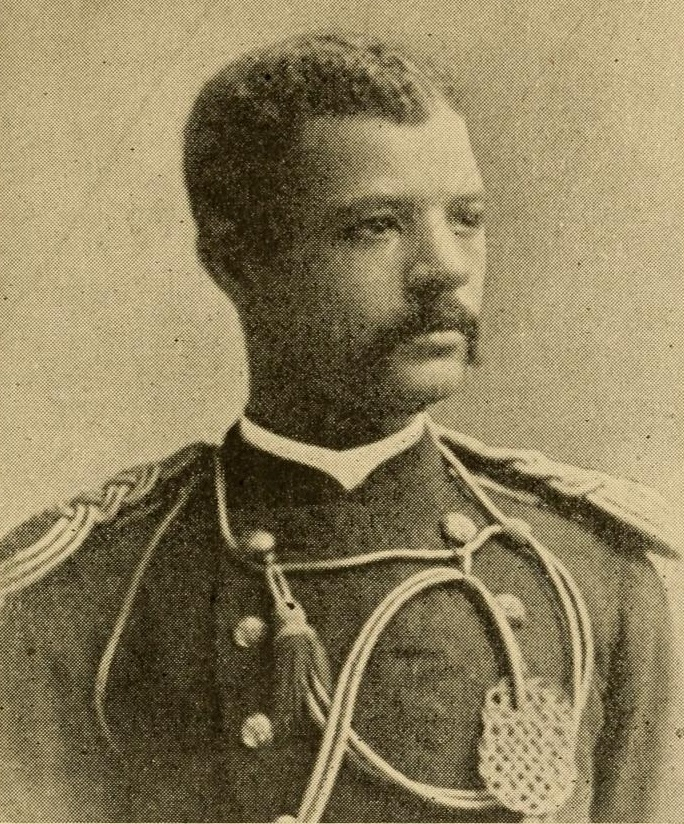
- From 1900's A New Negro for a New Century: An Accurate and Up-to-Date Record of the Upward Struggles of the Negro Race.
- Born: January 6, 1864; Helena, Arkansas
- Died: March 26, 1894 (aged 30); Wilberforce, Ohio
- Burial place: Cherry Grove Cemetery, Xenia, Ohio
- Military career
- Allegiance: United States
- Branch: United States Army
- Service years: 1887–1894
- Rank: Second Lieutenant
- Units: 9th Cavalry Regiment
- Conflicts: Indian Wars

John Hanks Alexander (January 6, 1864 – March 26, 1894) was the first African-American officer in the United States armed forces to hold a regular command position and the second African-American graduate of the United States Military Academy (after Henry Ossian Flipper).

== Early life ==
John Hanks Alexander was born on January 6, 1864, at Helena, Arkansas, the fourth of seven children born to former slaves James Milo Alexander and Fannie Miller Alexander. James Alexander was a barber and dry goods salesman in Helena and acquired property there. He later became the first black Justice of the Peace in Arkansas and represented Phillips County in the Arkansas House of Representatives. He died in 1871. All of the Alexander children graduated from high school and three attended Oberlin College in Ohio.

Alexander graduated number one in his high school class in Helena and soon moved to Carrollton, Mississippi, to take a position as a teacher. In late 1880 he visited his uncle in Cincinnati, Ohio, and ended up remaining in that city. The next year, he enrolled at Oberlin College and attended that institution until passing the entrance examination for West Point in 1883. Alexander was sponsored by Democratic U.S. Rep. George W. Geddes of Ohio.

== Military career ==
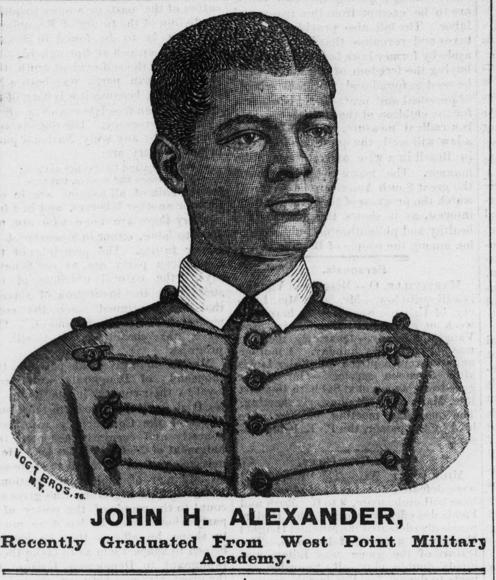
West Point graduation portrait, c. 1887

Alexander's experience at West Point is disputed. Some accounts suggest Alexander was generally accepted by the other cadets and was not subjected to as much intolerance as previous black cadets. Adjutant Eli Hoyle described Alexander as "a splendid scholar, getting along finely". Other accounts suggest he spent his early years at the academy in "social isolation", where he suffered from racial slurs and exclusion from extracurricular activities. At West Point, he was not allowed to room with white cadets, and would routinely be ignored while attending Sunday Chapel.

All accounts indicate that Alexander was known as an excellent student, especially in mathematics and languages and was a skilled boxer while at the academy. He distinguished himself as a skilled rider when performing in the cavalry drill. He graduated in the class of 1887 ranking 32nd in a class of 64.

Alexander was assigned to the 9th US Cavalry Regiment at Fort Robinson, Nebraska, which was an all-black regiment commanded by white officers and nicknamed Buffalo soldiers. In 1888, he was transferred to Fort Washakie, Wyoming, where he performed the garrison duty typical of an officer with a western frontier posting. While assigned to Fort Duchesne, Utah, in 1889, Alexander temporarily led the 9th Cavalry's B Troop, becoming the first black officer in the Army to hold a command position.

In February 1894, Alexander was sent to Wilberforce University, an all-black institution, as a professor of military science and tactics. Shortly after arriving, he died unexpectedly of a ruptured aorta on March 26, 1894. John Hanks Alexander was buried with military honors in Xenia, Ohio.

== Legacy ==
A military installation at Newport News, Virginia, was named Camp Alexander in honor of John Alexander.

== See also ==
- List of first minority male lawyers and judges in Arkansas
- Charles Young Buffalo Soldiers National Monument
