= Helena–West Helena School District =

School district in Arkansas, United States

Location
- United States
- Coordinates: 34.5402°N 90.6210°W

District information
- Type: Public (government funded)
- Grades: PK-12
- NCES District ID: 0507680

Students and staff
- Students: 2428
- Teachers: 190.0
- Athletic conference: 5A Central (2012-14)

Other information
- Website: www.hwhschools.org

The Helena–West Helena School District is a school district headquartered in Helena–West Helena, Arkansas, United States. The district is one of three school districts in Phillips County, Arkansas and operates three schools.

== History ==
In 2005 the school district's budget was projected to be negative by $2.3 million the following year. On September 8, 2005, the Arkansas Board of Education temporarily assumed control under the terms of the Omnibus Quality Education Act and made former Little Rock Central High School principal Rudolph Howard the superintendent of Helena-West Helena; Helena-West Helena was the first school district to undergo this form of control. In 2008 the budget had a positive balance of $5.7 million.

The district had 2,714 students circa 2008.

As of 2011 the district has over 2,833 students and 283 employees.

== Schools ==
Schools include:

- Central High School—Grades 7 through 12.
- Eliza Miller Primary School—Grades 4 through 6
- J. F. Wahl Elementary School—Grades Pre-k through 3rd.

Former schools:

- Eliza Miller Jr. High School (West Helena)
- Beechcrest Elementary School (West Helena)
  - The school was built in 1928. In Spring 2017 KIPP Delta bought the campus from the school district, and since 2017 KIPP: Delta Elementary Literacy Academy is located in that campus.
- Westside Elementary School (West Helena)
- Woodruff Elementary School (West Helena)
- S.T.A.R.S. Academy (Helena)
- Eliza Miller High School (West Helena)
