= Phillips Community College of the University of Arkansas =

Public college in Helena–West Helena, Arkansas, US

- Phillips Community College
- PCC logo
- Former names: Phillips County Community College; Rice Belt Technical Institute
- Type: Community college
- Established: 1965
- Affiliations: University of Arkansas System
- Chancellor: Dr. Keith Pinchback
- Students: 2,350
- Location: Helena-West Helena, Arkansas, United States; 34.5471°N 90.6166°W
- Campus: rural
- Website: www.pccua.edu

Phillips Community College of the University of Arkansas (PCC) is a public community college in Helena-West Helena, Arkansas. The college enrolls 2,350 students (64% female, 36% male) and has been accredited by The Higher Learning Commission of the North Central Association of Colleges and Schools the since 1970. As of 2009, the college has three campuses: the Helena-West Helena Campus, the DeWitt Campus, and the Stuttgart Campus.

== History ==
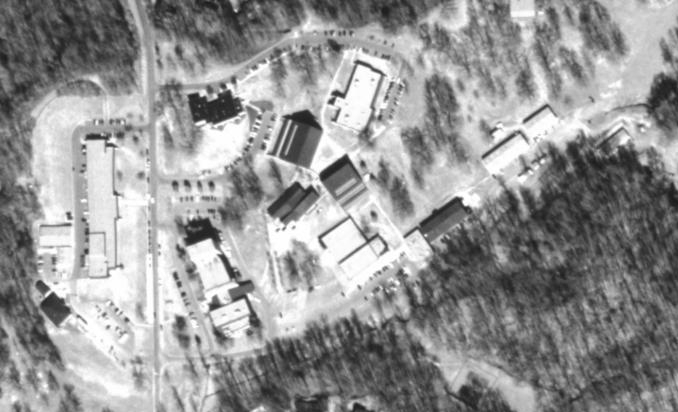
Aerial view of Helena-West Helena campus

The college was founded in 1965 with initial classes held in the Naval Reserve Building in Helena, moving in 1968 to the current campus. Its initial name of Phillips County Community College reflected the college's initial funding from the people of Phillips County. In 1996, Arkansas County joined the PCCC taxation district and the college name was changed to Phillips Community College. In 1996 the college acquired the Rice Belt Technical Institute in DeWitt from the state. Further, the college became part of the University of Arkansas System. The college is affiliated with the PCCUA Foundation, founded in 1975, to provide private support to the college.

=== Chancellors ===
1. Dr. John Easley (1965–1988)
2. Dr. Steven W. Jones (1988–2003)
3. Dr. Steven Murray (2003–2015)
4. Dr. Keith Pinchback (2015–present)

== Pillow-Thompson House ==
In 1993 the college received the Pillow-Thompson House in downtown Helena as a historic donation. The house was built in 1896 by Jerome B. Pillow by descendants of the Pillow family. The house was designed by George Barber and is noted for its Queen Anne architecture. Following the donation, the home was renovated to its original style and opened to the public in 1997.
