= Arkansas Highway 44 =

Highway in Arkansas

Highway 44

Route information
- Maintained by ArDOT

Section 1
- Length: 11.8 mi (19.0 km)
- West end: US 165 near Gillett
- East end: La Grue Bayou

Section 2
- Length: 47.1 mi (75.8 km)
- West end: CR 629 at Snow Lake
- East end: AR 20 in Helena-West Helena

Section 3
- Length: 7.4 mi (11.9 km)
- West end: AR 1B in Marianna
- East end: CR 239 at Bear Creek Lake

Location
- Country: United States
- State: Arkansas
- Counties: Arkansas, Desha, Phillips, Lee

Highway system
- Arkansas Highway System; Interstate; US; State; Business; Spurs; Suffixed; Scenic; Heritage
← AR 43	→ AR 45

Arkansas Highway 44 (AR 44) is a designation for three state highways in Arkansas. One segment of 11.8 miles (19.0 km) runs from U.S. Route 165 (US 165) north of Gillett east to the La Grue Bayou. A second segment of 47.1 miles (75.8 km) runs from Snow Lake northeast to Highway 20 in Helena-West Helena. A third segment of 7.4 miles (11.9 km) runs from Highway 1B in Marianna east to Lee CR 239 at Bear Creek Lake. Highway 44 is part of the Great River Road and Crowley's Ridge Parkway.

== Route description ==
=== Gillett to La Grue Bayou ===
Highway 44 begins at US 165 north of Gillett. The route runs east through the unincorporated community of Tichnor, before ending at the La Grue Bayou about 12 miles (19.3 km) east. Highway 44 is very rural, and does not intersect any highways.

=== Snow Lake to Helena-West Helena ===
The route begins at Snow Lake as a continuation of Desha CR 629 and runs north. Highway 44 is almost entirely rural for the first 24 miles (39 km), intersecting the unincorporated communities of Ferguson, Mellwood and Crumrod. The route eventually intersects Highway 20 in Elaine, and intersects Highway 85 about 9.6 miles (15.4 km) farther down the road in Lake View. Highway 44 still remains incredibly rural all the way until it terminates at Highway 20 in Helena-West Helena.

=== Marianna to Bear Creek Lake ===
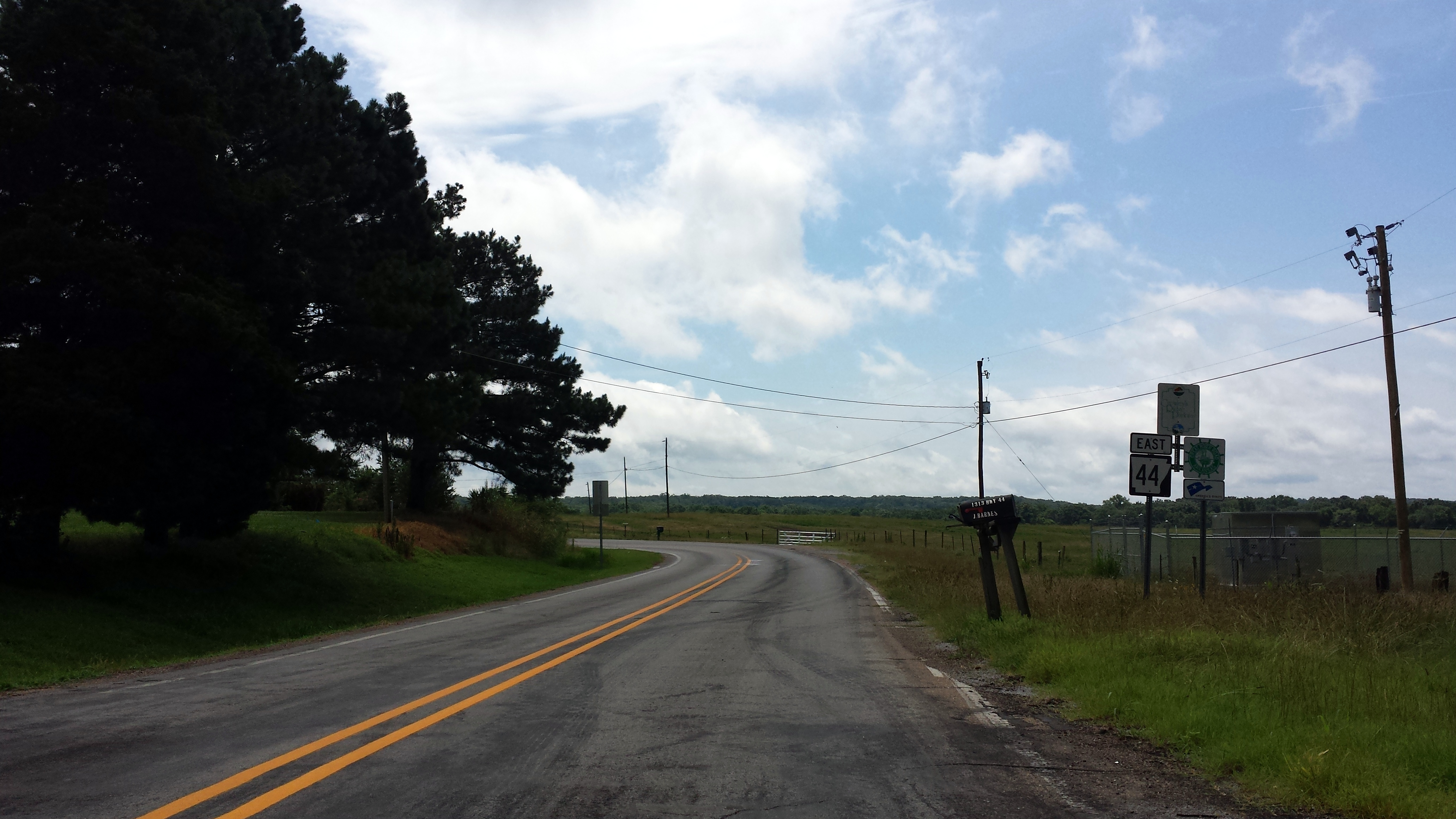
Eastbound Highway 44 east of Marianna

The route begins at Highway 1B in Marianna and is locally known as Martin Luther King Jr. Drive in the town. Highway 44 heads east, out of the town and enters Mississippi River State Park shortly after, and into the St. Francis National Forest. The route continues to head southeast, and eventually terminates at Lee CR 239 at Bear Creek Lake.

== Major intersections ==
County	Location	mi	km	Destinations	Notes
Arkansas	Gillett	0.0	0.0	US 165 – Gillett, DeWitt, Dumas	Western terminus
Arkansas		11.8	19.0	La Grue Bayou	Eastern terminus
Gap in route
Desha	Snow Lake	0.0	0.0	CR 629	Continuation south
Phillips	Elaine	24.1	38.8	AR 20 – Lambrook, Modoc	Former AR 49
Phillips	Lake View	33.6	54.1	AR 85 north – Oneida	Southern terminus of AR 85
Phillips		40.4	65.0	AR 318 west – Oneida	Eastern terminus of AR 318
Phillips		44.0	70.8	AR 242 west – West Helena	Eastern terminus of AR 242
Phillips	Helena-West Helena	47.1	75.8	AR 20 – Helena-West Helena	Eastern terminus; former AR 49
Gap in route
Lee	Marianna	0.0	0.0	AR 1B – Marianna	Western terminus
Lee	Marianna	1.3	2.1	AR 185 south	Northern terminus of AR 185
Lee		7.4	11.9	CR 239	Eastern terminus
1.000 mi = 1.609 km; 1.000 km = 0.621 mi
