= Arkansas Highway 318 =

State highway in Arkansas, United States

Highway 318

Route information
- Maintained by ArDOT
- Existed: November 23, 1966–present

Section 1
- Length: 4.39 mi (7.07 km)
- West end: AR 85 at Oneida
- East end: AR 44 near Oneida

Section 2
- Length: 15.12 mi (24.33 km)
- West end: AR 1 near Marvell
- East end: AR 20 / Great River Road near Lambrook

Location
- Country: United States
- State: Arkansas
- Counties: Phillips

Highway system
- Arkansas Highway System; Interstate; US; State; Business; Spurs; Suffixed; Scenic; Heritage
← AR 317	→ AR 319

Highway 318 (AR 318, Ark. 318, and Hwy. 318) is a designation for two state highways in Phillips County, Arkansas. One route of 4.39 miles (7.07 km) begins at Highway 85 at Oneida and runs east to Highway 44. A second route of 15.12 miles (24.33 km) begins at Highway 1 and runs east to Highway 20. A portion of the route between Watkins Corner and Lambrook is designated as part of the Great River Road National Scenic Byway.

All routes are maintained by the Arkansas State Highway and Transportation Department (AHTD). There is also one former routing of Highway 318, which was supplanted by US Highway 49 (US 49).

== Route description ==
=== Oneida to Highway 44 ===
Highway 318 begins at Highway 85 at Oneida southwest of Helena-West Helena. The route runs due east as a section line road, turning due north for approximately 0.5 miles (0.80 km) before turning east again. The route terminates at an intersection with Highway 44.

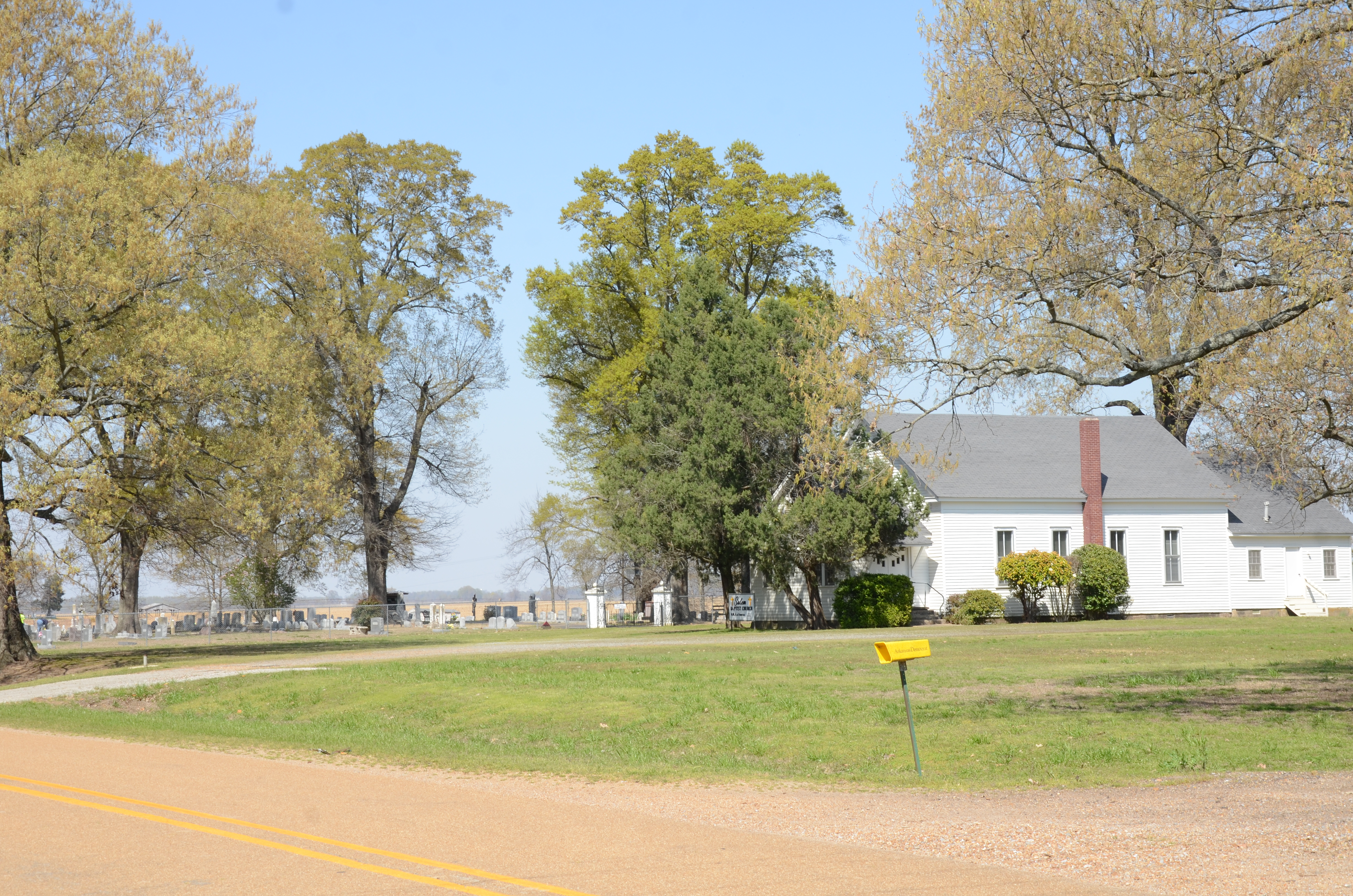
Highway 318 passes through the Turner Historic District listed on the National Register of Historic Places

=== Highway 1 to Highway 20 ===
Highway 318 begins at Highway 1 southwest of Marvell in the Arkansas Delta. The highway runs due south as a section line road to Cypert, where it passes through the Turner Historic District, listed on the National Register of Historic Places. The route continues south to Watkins Corner, where it intersects Highway 318Y, a short connection providing access to Highway 316 for westbound traffic. Highway 318 intersects Highway 316 and the Great River Road, including a brief officially designated exception. (Note: Map note: 4.49-4.98 0.49 MI EXCEPTION OVER S.H. 316) After this short eastbound concurrency, Highway 318 continues due south again, now concurrent with the Great River Road, as a section line road, bridging Big Creek and crossing two levees before a junction with Highway 20 near Lambrook, where the route terminates. The Great River Road continues west along Highway 20 to Elaine.

== History ==
The section between Oneida and Highway 44 was created by the Arkansas State Highway Commission on November 23, 1966. A new section was created near Watkins Corner south to a county road on June 28, 1973, pursuant to Act 9 of 1973 by the Arkansas General Assembly. The act directed county judges and legislators to designate up to 12 miles (19 km) of county roads as state highways in each county. The highway was extended south to Highway 20 on February 27, 1974. The route was extended north on August 28, 1974 during a renumbering of routes in the area to improve continuity. The Highway 318 extension supplanted Highway 243 north of Watkins Corner. In 1974, the AHTD temporarily used a Bailey bridge for 210 feet (64 m) over Big Creek following a bridge failure. The temporary structure was replaced with a permanent precast concrete bridge later that year.

== Major intersections ==
The entire route is in Phillips County.

Location	mi	km	Destinations	Notes
Oneida	0.00	0.00	AR 85 – Walnut Corner, Lake View	Western terminus
	4.39	7.07	AR 44 – Helena-West Helena, Lake View	Eastern terminus
Gap in route
	0.00	0.00	AR 1 – Marvell, DeWitt	Western terminus
Watkins Corner	4.16	6.69	AR 318Y west to AR 316	AR 318Y eastern terminus
Watkins Corner	4.49– 4.98	7.23– 8.01	AR 316 / Great River Road – Poplar Grove	Officially designated exception
	15.12	24.33	AR 20 / Great River Road – Elaine, Lambrook	Eastern terminus; former AR 49
1.000 mi = 1.609 km; 1.000 km = 0.621 mi

== Former route ==
Highway 318
- Location: Helena-West Helena
- Length: 2.60 mi (4.18 km)
- Existed: June 23, 1965–June 24, 1970

Highway 318 (AR 318, Ark. 318, and Hwy. 318) is a former state highway of 2.60 miles (4.18 km) in Phillips County.

=== Route description ===
The route began at Highway 242 south of West Helena and ran southeast to an intersection with Highway 20 in Helena, near the Helena Bridge over the Mississippi River, which was a toll bridge during the lifespan of Highway 318.

=== History ===
The route was created by the Arkansas State Highway Commission as the first section of Highway 318 on June 23, 1965. Following construction of a US 49 bypass of Helena, including a partial replacement of Highway 318 by new US 49, the route was decommissioned on June 24, 1970.

=== Major intersections ===
The entire route was in Phillips County.

Location	mi	km	Destinations	Notes
	0.0	0.0	AR 242 – West Helena	Western terminus
Helena	2.60	4.18	AR 20 – Helena, Elaine	Eastern terminus
1.000 mi = 1.609 km; 1.000 km = 0.621 mi
