= Arkansas Highway 85 =

State highway in Arkansas, United States

Highway 85

Route information
- Maintained by ArDOT
- Length: 9.73 mi (15.66 km)
- Existed: 1926–present

Major junctions
- South end: AR 44 in Lake View
- North end: US 49 / AR 1 in Walnut Corner

Location
- Country: United States
- State: Arkansas
- Counties: Phillips

Highway system
- Arkansas Highway System; Interstate; US; State; Business; Spurs; Suffixed; Scenic; Heritage
← AR 84	→ AR 86

Arkansas Highway 85 (AR 85, Ark. 85, and Hwy. 85) is a 9.73-mile (15.66 km) north–south state highway located entirely within Phillips County in the U.S. state of Arkansas. The highway runs from Highway 44 in Lake View north to U.S. Route 49/Highway 1 (US 49/AR 1) in Walnut Corner. Highway 85 is maintained by the Arkansas State Highway and Transportation Department.

== Route description ==
Highway 85 begins at an intersection with Highway 44 at the eastern border of Lake View. Old Town Lake lies to the south of the junction. From here, the route heads north through a rural area along the Lake View border. The road crosses the Johnson Ditch at the northern border of Lake View followed by the Beaver Bayou before entering the community of Oneida. In Oneida, Highway 85 intersects Arkansas Highway 318 at the eastern terminus of a section of the route. Past this intersection, the highway continues north through rural terrain. The route crosses Lick Creek prior to entering Barton. It passes Barton High School before entering Walnut Corner and terminating at a junction with U.S. Route 49 and Arkansas Highway 1.

== History ==
Highway 85 was designated in 1926 as one of the original state highways. Its route has not changed since its establishment.

== Major intersections ==
The entire route is in Phillips County.

Location	mi	km	Destinations	Notes
Lake View	0.0	0.0	AR 44 – Helena–West Helena, Elaine	Southern terminus
Oneida	3.57	5.75	AR 318	
Walnut Corner	9.73	15.66	US 49 / AR 1 north – Marianna, Marvell, Helena–West Helena	Northern terminus
1.000 mi = 1.609 km; 1.000 km = 0.621 mi

== See also ==
- List of state highways in Arkansas
