= Arkansas Highway 20 =

State highway in Arkansas, United States

Highway 20

Route information
- Maintained by ArDOT
- Length: 31.76 mi (51.11 km)
- Existed: 1964–present

Major junctions
- West end: CR 622 at Lambrook
- East end: US 49 in Helena–West Helena

Location
- Country: United States
- State: Arkansas
- Counties: Phillips

Highway system
- Arkansas Highway System; Interstate; US; State; Business; Spurs; Suffixed; Scenic; Heritage
← AR 19	→ AR 21

Arkansas Highway 20 (AR 20) is an east–west state highway in Phillips County, Arkansas. The route runs 31.76 miles (51.11 km) from Phillips CR 622 at Lambrook northeast to U.S. Route 49 (US 49) in Helena–West Helena. Segments of the route make up the western routing of the Great River Road.

== Route description ==
Highway 20 begins at Phillips CR 622 at Lambrook and runs east. After the highway passes the Lambrook post office, the route serves as the southern terminus for Highway 318 and turns southeast toward Elaine. The city brings a junction with Highway 44, after which Highway 20 becomes a minor state highway winding along the Mississippi River. The route passes through the unincorporated community of Modoc before meeting Highway 20S. This spur runs due south to the Mississippi River. The parent highway Highway 20 continues as a two-lane rural route, meeting Highway 44 in south Helena–West Helena before terminating at US 49.

=== Great River Road ===
The Great River Road runs on Highway 20 from US 49 to Highway 44 in the extreme southern part of Helena–West Helena. The scenic byway follows Highway 44 south to Elaine, when the Great River Road joins with Highway 20 westbound. The route remains scenic until the junction with Highway 318 east of Lambrook.

== History ==

Highway 20 was one of the original state highways, designated in 1926. The route began at Highway 3 in east Monroe County and ran east through Marvell and Barton on its way to Helena, when the route turned south. Highway 20 continued south along its current routing from Helena, then along its present spur route to terminate at the Mississippi River. Highway 3 was later replaced by US 79 in the area. In 1962, all of Highway 20 was transferred to Highway 6 and Highway 49. In 1963, Highway 20 was reestablished as a renumbering of Highway 49 from Helena to Lambrook, and Highway 49 Spur became Highway 20 Spur. Arkansas Highway 49 was designated from Highway 20 to Highway 44 in Elaine. It extended to Lambrook in 1952. In September 1962, it extended to Helena, replacing half of Highway 20. The section of Highway 20 from Highway 49's former end at Highway 20 became a spur of Highway 49. In 1963, US 49 extended into Arkansas, and Highway 49 was renumbered Highway 20.

== Major intersections ==
The entire route is in Phillips County.

Location	mi	km	Destinations	Notes
Lambrook	0.00	0.00	CR 622	Western terminus
	2.19	3.52	AR 318 west	Eastern terminus of AR 318
Elaine	8.26	13.29	AR 44	
	25.56	41.13	AR 20S south	Northern terminus of AR 20S
Helena–West Helena	31.56	50.79	AR 44 west	Eastern terminus of AR 44
Helena–West Helena	31.76	51.11	US 49	Eastern terminus
1.000 mi = 1.609 km; 1.000 km = 0.621 mi

== Spur route ==
Highway 20S
- Location: Phillips County
- Length: 1.92 mi (3.09 km)

Arkansas Highway 20 Spur is a spur route in east Phillips County. It is a former alignment of Highway 20 that runs north from a levee on the Mississippi River to Highway 20.

Major intersections

The entire route is in Phillips County.

Location	mi	km	Destinations	Notes
	1.92	3.09	Mississippi River	Southern terminus
	0.00	0.00	AR 20	Northern terminus
1.000 mi = 1.609 km; 1.000 km = 0.621 mi

== See also ==
- List of state highways in Arkansas
