= Mellwood, Arkansas =

- Census-designated place
- Location within Arkansas Location within the United States
- Coordinates: 34°13′11″N 90°57′01″W
- Country: United States
- State: Arkansas
- County: Phillips
- Elevation: 161 ft (49 m)

Population (2020)
  - Total: 21
- Time zone: UTC-6 (Central (CST))
  - Summer (DST): UTC-5 (CDT)
- ZIP code: 72367
- Area code: 870
- GNIS feature ID: 58161

Mellwood is an unincorporated community and census-designated place (CDP) in Phillips County, Arkansas, United States. Mellwood is located on Arkansas Highway 44, 8.5 miles (13.7 km) southwest of Elaine. Mellwood has a post office with ZIP code 72367. It was first listed as a CDP in the 2020 census with a population of 21.

The lynching of Owen Flemming occurred near Mellwood on June 8, 1927.

== Demographics ==
Historical population
Census	Pop.	Note	%±
2020	21		—
U.S. Decennial Census; 2020

=== 2020 census ===
Mellwood CDP, Arkansas – Racial and ethnic composition Note: the US Census treats Hispanic/Latino as an ethnic category. This table excludes Latinos from the racial categories and assigns them to a separate category. Hispanics/Latinos may be of any race.
Race / Ethnicity (NH = Non-Hispanic)	Pop 2020	% 2020
White alone (NH)	9	42.86%
Black or African American alone (NH)	7	33.33%
Native American or Alaska Native alone (NH)	1	4.76%
Asian alone (NH)	0	0.00%
Pacific Islander alone (NH)	0	0.00%
Some Other Race alone (NH)	0	0.00%
Mixed Race or Multi-Racial (NH)	4	19.05%
Hispanic or Latino (any race)	0	0.00%
Total	21	100.00%
