= Turner Historic District =

Historic district in Arkansas, United States

- U.S. National Register of Historic Places
- U.S. Historic district
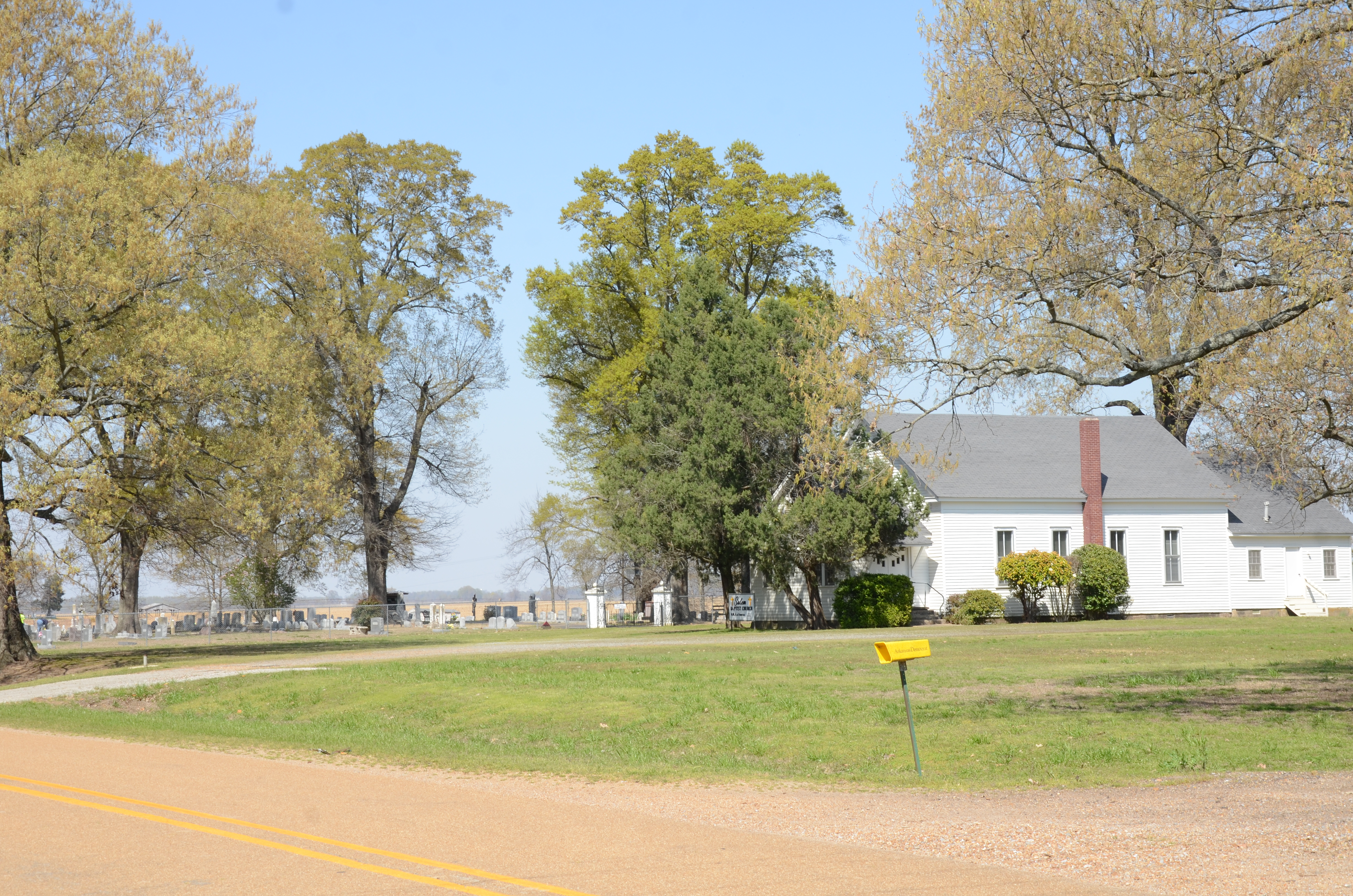

- Location within Arkansas Location within the United States
- Location: Corners of AR 318 and Phillips Cty Rd. 606, Cypert, Arkansas
- Coordinates: 34°29′31″N 90°57′24″W
- Area: 1.5 acres (0.61 ha)
- Built: 1895
- Architectural style: Queen Anne, Folk Victorian
- MPS: Cotton and Rice Farm History and Architecture in the Arkansas Delta MPS
- NRHP reference No.: 06000073
- Added to NRHP: March 2, 2006

The Turner Historic District encompasses the 19th-century core of the small community of Cypert in rural Phillips County, Arkansas. Located at the junction of Arkansas Highway 318 and County Road 606, south-southwest of Marvell, the district includes a store and house, both built and operated by members of the Turner family, who were among the first to settle the area. The John L. Turner House, built in 1896, is unusual as a relatively high-style Queen Anne Victorian for such a remote rural area. The N. B. Turner & Son Store, built in 1892, is wood-frame structure with Folk Victorian styling. Both properties continue to be owned by members of the Turner family.

The district was listed on the National Register of Historic Places in 2006.

== See also ==
- National Register of Historic Places listings in Phillips County, Arkansas
