= Cypert, Arkansas =

- Unincorporated community
- Location within Arkansas Location within the United States
- Coordinates: 34°29′24″N 90°57′22″W
- Country: United States
- State: Arkansas
- County: Phillips
- Elevation: 187 ft (57 m)
- Time zone: UTC-6 (Central (CST))
  - Summer (DST): UTC-5 (CDT)
- Area code: 870
- GNIS feature ID: 57621

Cypert is an unincorporated community in Phillips County, Arkansas, United States. The community is located on Arkansas Highway 318, 5.2 miles (8.4 km) south-southwest of Marvell.

The Turner Historic District, which is listed on the National Register of Historic Places, is located in Cypert.
