= Poplar Grove, Arkansas =

- Census-designated place
- Location within Arkansas Location within the United States
- Coordinates: 34°33′08″N 90°51′15″W
- Country: United States
- State: Arkansas
- County: Phillips
- Elevation: 190 ft (58 m)

Population (2020)
  - Total: 215
- Time zone: UTC-6 (Central (CST))
  - Summer (DST): UTC-5 (CDT)
- GNIS feature ID: 2805679

Poplar Grove is an unincorporated community and census-designated place (CDP) in Phillips County, Arkansas, United States, located on U.S. Route 49 between Marvell and West Helena. It was first listed as a CDP in the 2020 census with a population of 215.

Poplar Grove is a farming community surrounded by fields.

== Education ==
The Barton–Lexa School District provides early childhood, elementary and secondary education to more than 800 students in prekindergarten through grade 12 in two schools. Students complete their studies at Barton High School.

== Demographics ==
Historical population
Census	Pop.	Note	%±
2020	215		—
U.S. Decennial Census; 2020

=== 2020 census ===
Poplar Grove CDP, Arkansas – Racial and ethnic composition Note: the U.S. census treats Hispanic/Latino as an ethnic category. This table excludes Latinos from the racial categories and assigns them to a separate category. Hispanics/Latinos may be of any race.
Race / Ethnicity (NH = Non-Hispanic)	Pop 2020	% 2020
White alone (NH)	62	28.84%
Black or African American alone (NH)	141	65.58%
Native American or Alaska Native alone (NH)	0	0.00%
Asian alone (NH)	2	0.93%
Pacific Islander alone (NH)	0	0.00%
Some Other Race alone (NH)	0	0.00%
Mixed Race or Multi-Racial (NH)	6	2.79%
Hispanic or Latino (any race)	4	1.86%
Total	215	100.00%

== Notable residents ==
- Solomon Harper, inventor
