= Crumrod, Arkansas =

- Unincorporated community
- Location within Arkansas Location within the United States
- Coordinates: 34°08′55″N 90°58′54″W
- Country: United States
- State: Arkansas
- County: Phillips
- Elevation: 161 ft (49 m)
- Time zone: UTC-6 (Central (CST))
  - Summer (DST): UTC-5 (CDT)
- ZIP code: 72328
- Area code: 870
- GNIS feature ID: 57615

Crumrod is an unincorporated community in Phillips County, Arkansas, United States. Crumrod is located on Arkansas Highway 44, 13 miles (21 km) south-southwest of Elaine. Crumrod has a post office with ZIP code 72328.
