= Warrens Bridge =

- U.S. National Register of Historic Places
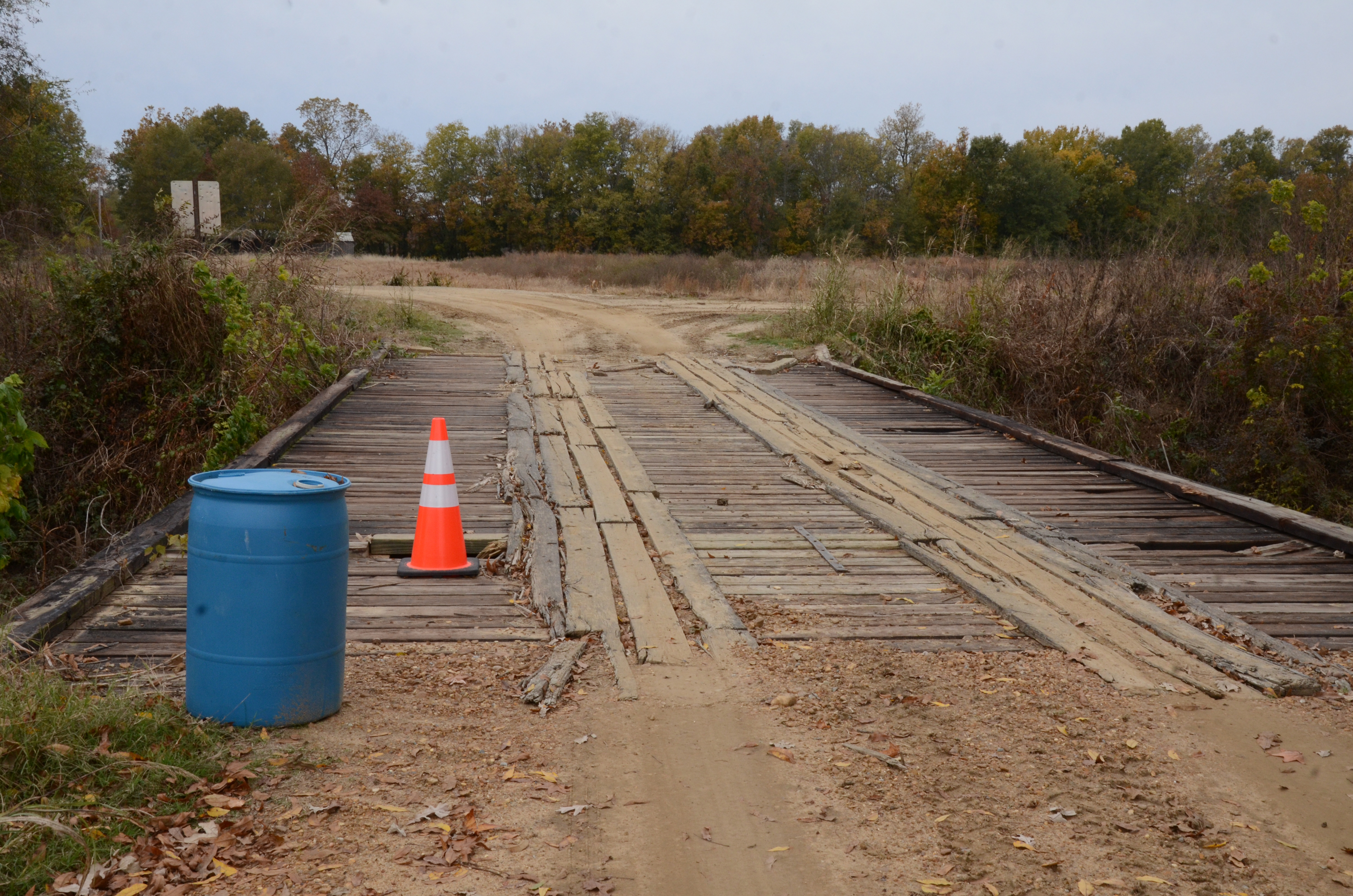

- Location within Arkansas Location within the United States
- Nearest city: Lambrook, Arkansas
- Coordinates: 34°20′9″N 91°0′42″W
- Area: less than one acre
- Built: 1930
- Architectural style: Timber Trestle
- MPS: Historic Bridges of Arkansas MPS
- NRHP reference No.: 95000612
- Added to NRHP: May 18, 1995

The Warrens Bridge is a historic timber-trestle bridge carrying Phillips County Road 141 across the Lambrook Levee Ditch west of Lambrook, Arkansas. The bridge has seven spans with a total length of 100 feet (30 m); the longest span is 15 feet (4.6 m). The bridge is 16 feet (4.9 m) wide, and is set on timber abutments and piers. It was built about 1930.

The bridge was listed on the National Register of Historic Places in 1995.

== See also ==
- National Register of Historic Places listings in Phillips County, Arkansas
- List of bridges on the National Register of Historic Places in Arkansas
