= Clark Hall (politician) =

American politician

Member of the Arkansas House of Representatives from the 13th district
- In office 2007–2013
- Preceded by: Arnell Willis
- Succeeded by: David Hillman

Phillips County Judge
- Incumbent
- Assumed office 2017

Mayor of Marvell
- In office 1994 – 2007; 2015 – 2018

Personal details
- Party: Democratic
- Profession: Politician, farmer

Clark Hall is a Democratic politician who served in the Arkansas House of Representatives from 2007 until 2013, representing the 13th District. Hall made an unsuccessful run for the U.S. House of Representatives in 2012. Hall served on the staff of Governor Mike Beebe from 2013 to 2014, Hall served as the mayor of Marvell, Arkansas from 2015 to 2018. Hall became Phillips County Judge in 2017.

== Early life ==
He was born and raised in the Arkansas Delta. He graduated from Arkansas State University. He has been a farmer for thirty years. Prior to being elected to the State House, he was a member of the Phillips County Quorum Court and the mayor of the city of Marvell.

== Arkansas legislature ==
=== Elections ===
In 2004, he first ran for the State Legislature. In the Democratic primary, he was defeated by Arnell Willis 57%-43%. In 2006, Willis decided to retire to run for a seat in the Arkansas Senate. Hall ran for the 13th House District again, and qualified for the run-off election as no candidate in the three candidate race got 50% of the vote. Bill Brandon and Hall got 36% of the vote. Hall defeated Brandon 50.2%-49.8%, a margin of just 12 votes. He won the general election unopposed. He won re-election in 2008 with 86%, and in 2010 unopposed. He was term-limited in 2012.

=== Committee assignments ===
- State Agencies and Governmental Affairs (Chairman)
  - Elections subcommittee (ex officio)
  - State Agencies & Reorganization subcommittee (ex officio)
  - Constitutional issues subcommittee (ex officio)
- Joint Budget Committee
- Public Health, Welfare, and Labor Committee
  - Labor & Environment subcommittee

== 2012 Congressional election ==
In October 2011, he announced he would run in Arkansas' 1st congressional district, currently held by freshman Congressman Rick Crawford. Hall criticized Crawford saying "They have pushed a rigid partisan agenda that threatens our nation's commitment to our seniors and future generations instead of focusing on putting people back to work. Hall was endorsed by the Blue Dog Coalition. Hall ran second in the three candidate primary with 38 percent of the vote but was narrowly defeated by Prosecuting Attorney Scott Ellington in the runoff election. Ellington in turn lost to Crawford in the general election.
