= Arkansas Highway 49 =

Arkansas Highway 49 may refer to:

- Arkansas Highway 49 (1926-1963), now numbered 20
- U.S. Route 49 in Arkansas, entered Arkansas in 1963
- Interstate 49 in Arkansas, numbered in 2014
