= Austin Barrow =

American politician

Austin Barrow was an American state legislator in Arkansas. He represented Phillips County, Arkansas in the Arkansas House of Representatives in 1871.
