= To Require Truth in Labeling of Agricultural Products that Are Edible by Humans =

To Require Truth in Labeling of Agricultural Products that Are Edible by Humans, also known as Act 501, is a law passed in the US state of Arkansas that restricts the terminology that can be applied to substitutes of animal-based foods. It also prohibits using the label "rice" for any food product that is not "the whole, broken, or ground kernels or by-products obtained from the species Oryza sativa L. or Oryza glaberrima, or wild rice, which is obtained from one of the four species of grasses from the genus Zizania or Proteresia". Arkansas produced nearly half of all the rice grown in the US in 2018. It was signed into law in March 2019. The legislation was proposed by David Hillman. Hillman stated that the use of meat terminology by producers of plant-based products is done to confuse consumers, saying, "the only way they can get people to try their product is to confuse them". The law stated that only products that derived from animals could be referred to as meat or other terminology traditionally associated with animal products, but the vague and expansive scope of the law means that products like peanut butter could be unlawful as well. Other labels that would be illegal include "cauliflower rice", "veggie dog", "veggie burger", and "almond milk", among others. The penalty for breaking the law is US$1,000 per violation.

In July 2019, the American Civil Liberties Union of Arkansas, Good Food Institute, and Animal Legal Defense Fund filed a lawsuit against the law on behalf of Tofurky, a brand that creates meat replacement products from wheat protein and tofu.
