= Marvell Academy =

Location
- 645 Highway 243 N. Marvell, Arkansas 72366; United States; 34°34′12″N 90°54′44″W

Information
- Type: Private
- Opened: 1966 (60 years ago)
- Principal: Susan Ligon
- Grades: K3-12
- Enrollment: 193 (2019)
- Website: www.marvellacademyeagles.com

Marvell Academy is a private K-12 school in unincorporated Phillips County, Arkansas, United States, near Marvell. It was founded as a segregation academy.

== History ==
Marvell public schools were integrated in 1965. In 1966, Marvell Academy was the first of many private schools founded by white parents in Arkansas to avoid integration. Many of the parents here were members of a White Citizens Council, believing that "Integration is the corruption of the true American heritage by alien concept and ideology".

The school opened with 73 students in two frame houses across a cotton field from the area public school. The school was founded with grades 1-8. Some grades had as few as five students. The school added a grade each year to provide education through high school.

By 1969, although the school was unaccredited, it had 400 students; it had only eight teachers in 11 grades. Tuition was $400 per year, and students had to supply their own textbooks. The headmaster was Charles Hinton. A 1969 Time magazine editorial article, describing the emergence of segregation academies, noted that "Few of them are quite so openly redneck as the Marvell Academy."

In the 2015-2016 school year, the school enrolled two Hispanic students and no Black students. As of 2019, the student body was 1% students of color.

The school is accredited by the Midsouth Association of Independent Schools (MAIS). This organization was created to legitimize segregation academies. It is not a nationally recognized accreditation agency. The school participates in academic competitions including spelling bee, reading fair, science fair, and art fair, as well as athletics including football, cheerleading, basketball, baseball, softball, track and field, and golf through the MAIS.
