= Marvell High School =

Location
- 1018B Hwy 49; Marvell, Arkansas 72348; United States; 34°57′2″N 90°28′22″W

Information
- School type: Public comprehensive
- Status: Open
- School district: Marvell–Elaine School District
- CEEB code: 041585
- NCES School ID: 050951000694
- Teaching staff: 10.93 (on FTE basis)
- Grades: 7–12
- Enrollment: 100 (2023-2024)
- Student to teacher ratio: 9.15
- Education system: ADE Smart Core
- Classes offered: Regular, Advanced Placement (AP)
- Campus type: Rural
- Colors: Blue and gold
- Athletics conference: 2A 6 (2012–14)
- Sports: Football, basketball, track
- Mascot: Mustang horse
- Team name: Marvell Mustangs
- Accreditation: ADE
- Affiliation: Arkansas Activities Association
- Website: www.mesd1.org

Marvell High School (MHS) is an accredited comprehensive public high school located in Marvell, Arkansas, United States. MHS provides secondary education for more than 220 students in grades 7 through 12. It is one of two public high schools in Phillips County and the only high schools administered by the Marvell–Elaine School District.

== Academics ==
Marvell High School is a Title I school that is accredited by the Arkansas Department of Education (ADE). The assumed course of study follows the ADE Smart Core curriculum, which requires students complete at least 22 units prior to graduation. Students complete regular coursework and exams and may take Advanced Placement (AP) courses and exam with the opportunity to receive college credit.

== Athletics ==
The Marvell High School mascot for academic and athletic teams are the Mustangs with blue and gold serving as the school colors.

The Marvell Mustangs compete in interscholastic activities within the 2A Classification, the state's second smallest classification administered by the Arkansas Activities Association. For 2012–14, the Mustangs play within the 2A 6 Conference. Marvell fields junior varsity and varsity teams including football, basketball (boys/girls), and track and field (boys/girls).

- Track and field: The girls track team won a state track championship in 1983.
