= Snow Lake, Arkansas =

- Unincorporated community
- Location in Arkansas Snow Lake (the United States)
- Coordinates: 34°03′39″N 91°01′23″W
- Country: United States
- State: Arkansas
- County: Desha
- Elevation: 157 ft (48 m)
- Time zone: UTC-6 (Central (CST))
  - Summer (DST): UTC-5 (CDT)
- ZIP code: 72379
- Area code: 870
- GNIS feature ID: 78398

Snow Lake is an unincorporated community in northeast Desha County, Arkansas, United States. Snow Lake is located on Arkansas Highway 44, 20 miles (32 km) south-southwest of Elaine. Snow Lake has a post office with ZIP code 72379.
