= Walnut Corner, Phillips County, Arkansas =

Walnut Corner, Arkansas
- Unincorporated community
- Location within Arkansas Location within the United States
- Coordinates: 34°33′18″N 90°46′05″W
- Country: United States
- State: Arkansas
- County: Phillips
- Elevation: 210 ft (64 m)
- Time zone: UTC-6 (Central (CST))
  - Summer (DST): UTC-5 (CDT)
- Area code: 870
- GNIS feature ID: 55995

Walnut Corner is an unincorporated community in Phillips County, Arkansas, United States. Walnut Corner is located at the junction of U.S. Route 49, Arkansas Highway 1, and Arkansas Highway 85, 3 miles (4.8 km) south-southwest of Lexa.
