= Ferguson, Arkansas =

Ferguson
- Unincorporated community
- Ferguson's position in Arkansas. Ferguson (the United States)
- Coordinates: 34°08′17″N 90°59′02″W
- Country: United States
- State: Arkansas
- County: Phillips
- Elevation: 157 ft (48 m)
- Time zone: UTC-6 (Central (CST))
  - Summer (DST): UTC-5 (CDT)
- GNIS feature ID: 57748

Ferguson is an unincorporated community in Phillips County, Arkansas, United States.

At 6:30 PM on April 26, 2011, a tornado – part of the 2011 Super Outbreak – hit Ferguson and traveled along Arkansas Highway 44 toward Coahoma, Mississippi. The tornado was rated EF0 with winds estimated at 80 mph (130 km/h; 70 kn), a width of 200 yards (180 m), that traveled a path of 17.8 miles (28.6 km). The tornado knocked down trees, power lines, telephone poles, road signs, and irrigation facilities.
