= Solomon Harper =

American inventor (1895–1980)

Solomon Harper (upper left) as photographed in The Crisis magazine in 1915

Solomon Harper (October 8, 1895, Poplar Grove, Arkansas - December 8, 1980, New York, New York ) was an electrical engineer and inventor known for creating the first electrically heated hair roller and 28 other inventions.

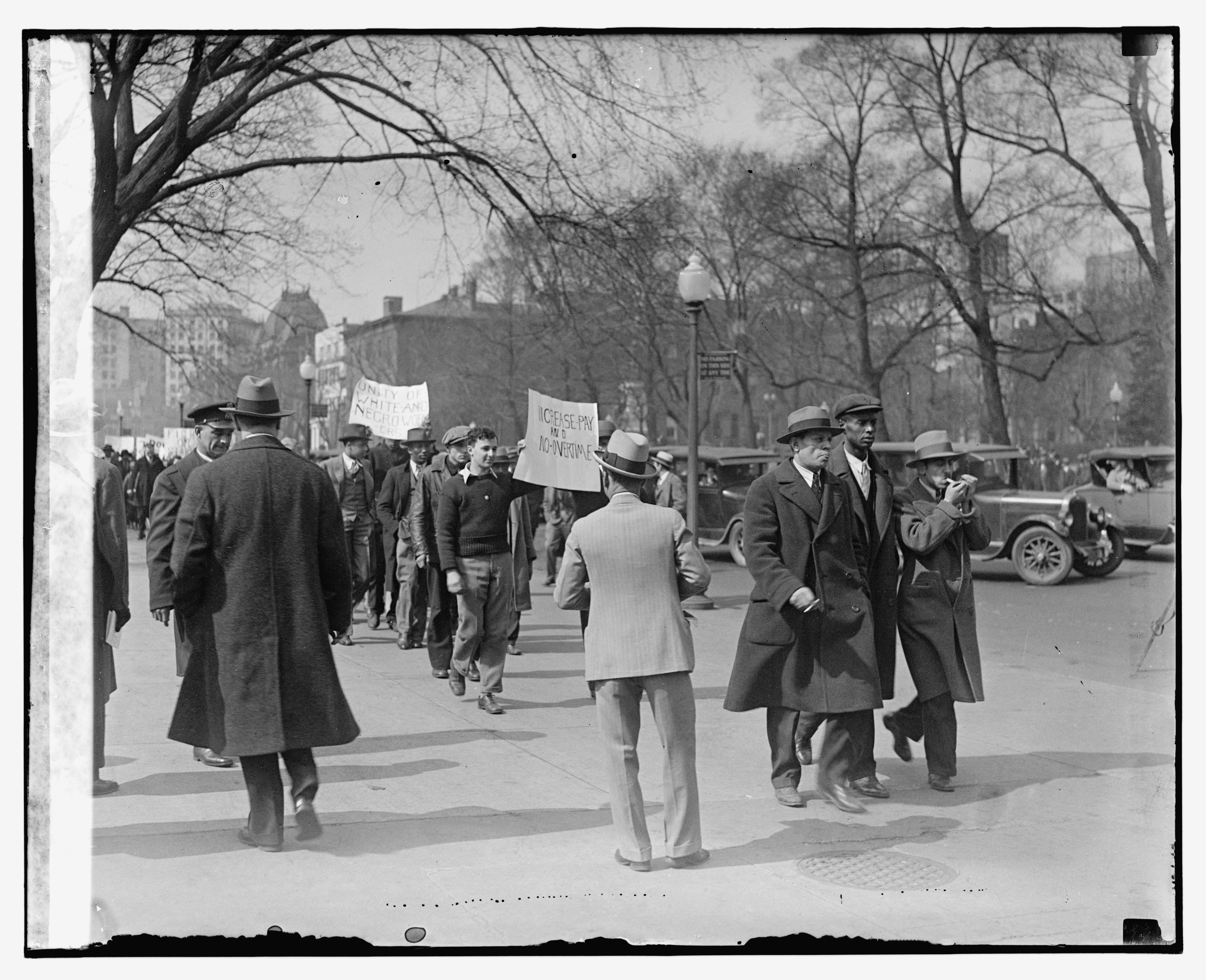
Solomon Harper (2nd from the right) as photographed by the National Photo Company near the White House March 6, 1930.

Harper worked for various railways performing jobs like section head, construction and other locomotive work. In 1914, he applied for his first patent for his block system which he invented to prevent train collision. It was designed to prevent rear and head on collision and to prevent trains from running into open switches, to automatically reduce train's speed at dangerous places, and to stop trains at railways junctions.

"Electrical hair-treating implement" patent filed by Solomon Harper in 1924

During the course of his career, he struggled to receive recognition and compensation for his inventions. Harper was trained as an electrical engineer and was a veteran. He was a politically active communist, and organized at least one march to picket the White House about unemployment in 1930.
