= Samuel L. Kountz =

African-American kidney transplantation surgeon

- Born: October 20, 1930; Lexa, Arkansas, United States
- Died: December 23, 1981 (aged 51); Great Neck, New York, United States
- Education: Stanford University, University of Arkansas at Pine Bluff, University of Arkansas for Medical Sciences
- Known for: Kidney Transplantation, Pioneering Kidney Research, discoveries, and inventions
- Awards: Fulbright Award
- Scientific career
- Fields: Kidney Transplantation
- Workplaces: Stanford University Medical Center, San Francisco General Hospital

Samuel Lee Kountz Jr. (October 30, 1930 – December 23, 1981) was an African-American kidney transplantation surgeon from Lexa, Arkansas. He was most distinguished for his pioneering work in the field of kidney transplantations, and in research, discoveries, and inventions in Renal Science. In 1961, while working at the Stanford University Medical Center, he performed the first successful kidney transplant between humans who were not identical twins. Six years later, he and a team of researchers at the University of California, San Francisco, developed the prototype for the Belzer kidney perfusion machine, a device that can preserve kidneys for up to 50 hours from the time they are taken from a donor's body. It is now standard equipment in hospitals and research laboratories around the world.

== Early life and career ==
Samuel Lee Kountz, the eldest son of a Baptist minister, J. S. Kountz, was born in Lexa, Arkansas, in 1930. He first became interested in medicine at the age of eight, when he accompanied an injured friend to a local hospital for emergency treatment. He was so moved by the doctors' ability to relieve his friend's suffering that he decided from that moment to become a physician. He completed his early education in Lexa, then spent three years at a Baptist boarding school for young people considering the ministry. He later graduated from Morris Booker College High School in Dermott, Arkansas (Chicot County). Although the school provided him with the discipline he needed, its academic program was inadequate, and he was forced to take remedial courses before gaining admission to the Agricultural, Mechanical and Normal College of Arkansas (now the University of Arkansas at Pine Bluff). After much improvement, he graduated third in his class in 1952.

During his senior year, Kountz had met Senator J. William Fulbright, who had once been president of the University of Arkansas. Impressed by Kountz's energy and enthusiasm, Fulbright asked him what he planned to do following graduation. Kountz told him that he hoped to attend a black medical school, where he could realize his lifelong dream of becoming a surgeon. Fulbright urged him to consider the medical school in Little Rock, AR, instead. Kountz applied but was rejected; he spent the next two years completing graduate work in chemistry at the university's Fayetteville campus. Then, on the basis of his accomplishments, he was awarded a full medical scholarship, and in 1954 was admitted to the University of Arkansas for Medical Sciences.

Kountz completed a master's degree in chemistry in 1956; two years later he received his M.D. He spent the next year as an intern with the highly competitive Stanford Service of San Francisco General Hospital, and, in 1959, he began his surgical training at the Stanford University School of Medicine. It was at Stanford that he studied the field of organ transplantation, and decided to make transplant surgery his life's work. He was still a resident in 1961, when he made medical history by performing the first kidney transplant using a non-twin donor. Among Kountz's other contributions were the discovery that large doses of the steroid drug methylprednisolone could reverse acute rejection of a transplanted kidney, and that re-implantation (the implantation of a second donor kidney at the earliest indication that the first might be rejected) could mean the difference between the death and survival for transplant patients. A tireless proponent of organ donation, he once performed a kidney transplant on live television, The Today Show, in 1976, inspiring some 20,000 viewers to offer their kidneys to patients who needed them. In addition, his groundbreaking research in the area of tissue typing helped improve the results of kidney transplantation and led to the increased use of kidneys from unrelated donors.

Kountz was appointed Professor of Surgery and chairman of the department at the State University of New York (SUNY), Downstate Medical Center in Brooklyn, New York beginning in 1972 and Surgeon-in-Chief of Kings County Hospital. The University of Arkansas awarded him the honorary Juris Doctor in 1973. He developed the largest kidney transplant research and training program in the country at the University of California, San Francisco.

At the time of his death, he had personally performed some 500 kidney transplants, the most performed by any physician in the world at that time.

== Background and education ==
BS, University of Arkansas at Pine Bluff, 1952. MD, University of Arkansas for Medical Sciences, 1958; Intern, Stanford Service, San Francisco General Hospital, 1958–59; assistant resident, department of surgery, Stanford University School of Medicine, 1959–62; Bank of America Giannini fellow, Hammersmith Hospital, London, 1962–63; Stanford University School of Medicine, senior resident, department of surgery, 1963–64, chief resident, 1964–65, instructor, department of surgery, 1965–66; visiting Fulbright Award professor, United Arab Republic, 1965–66; assistant professor, department of surgery, Stanford University School of Medicine, 1966–67; associate professor, department of surgery, University of California, San Francisco, School of Medicine, 1967–72, professor, 1972; professor and chairman, department of surgery, State University of New York Downstate Medical Center, Brooklyn, and chief of general surgery, Kings County Hospital Center, 1972–77.

== Awards and honors ==
Over the years, produced close to 100 articles and investigative reports and co-authored dozens more. He has been a recipient of the Young Investigator's Award, American College of Cardiology, 1964; Diplomat, American Board of Surgeons, 1966; Lederle Medical Faculty Award, 1967; Honorary Doctor of Humane Letters, University of California, San Francisco, 1970; Honorary Doctor of Laws, University of Arkansas, 1973; Honorary Doctor of Laws, Howard University, 1975, and the Fulbright Award

== Illness and death ==
While on a lecture tour in South Africa in 1977, Kountz contracted a crippling brain disease that left him neurologically impaired and confined to his bed, unable to communicate, or care for himself, for the rest of his life. His illness was never diagnosed, and he died on December 23, 1981, at the age of 51. In July 1980 the National Association for the Advancement of Colored People presented an Afro- Academic, Technological, and Scientific Olympics program award, which is a special high school science award for African American students, in his honor. Five years later the World's First International Symposium on Renal Failure and Transplantation in Blacks was dedicated to his memory.
