= Mayo House (Marvell, Arkansas) =

Historic house in Arkansas, United States

- U.S. National Register of Historic Places
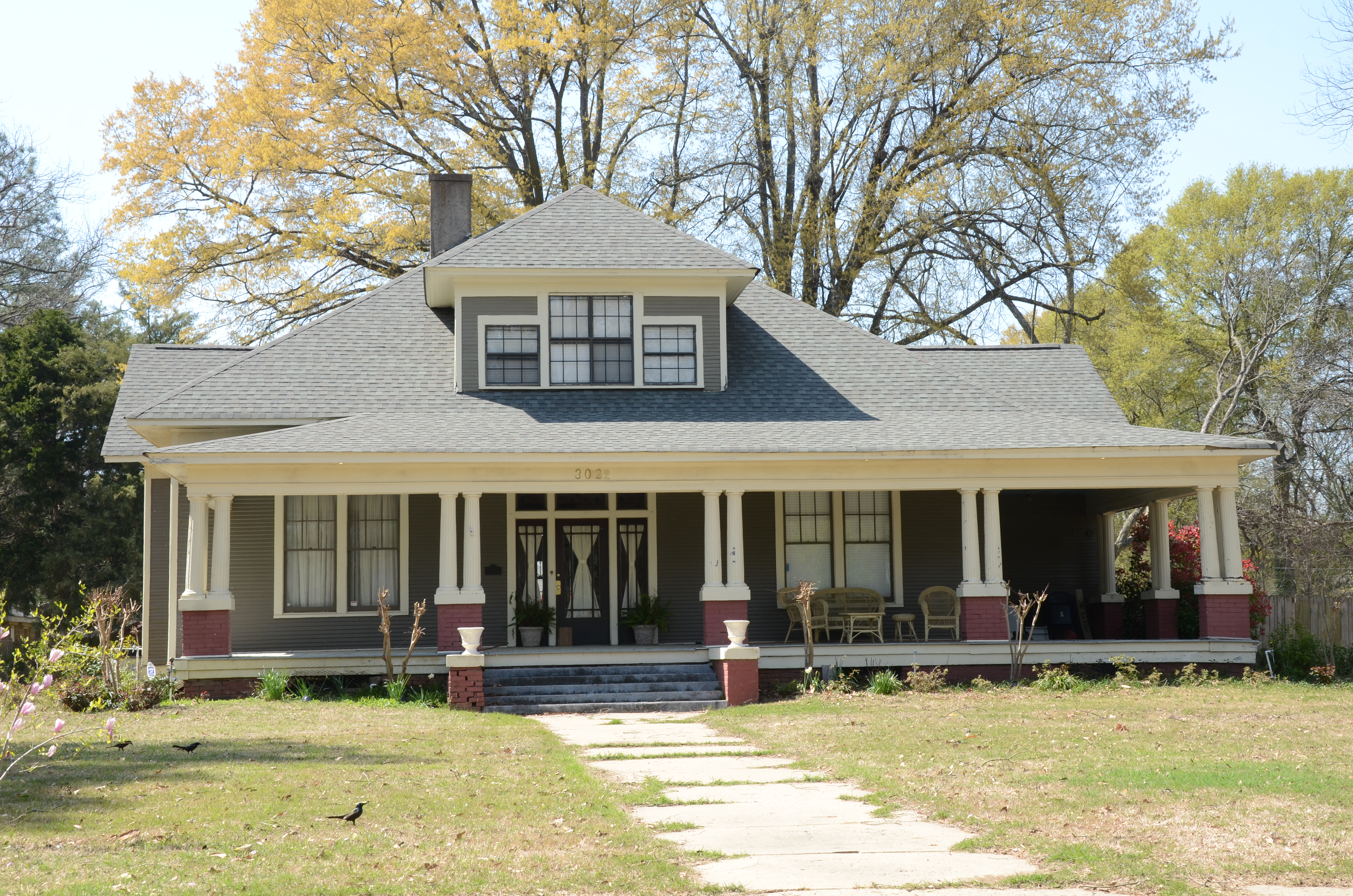

- Location within Arkansas Location within the United States
- Location: 302 Elm St., Marvell, Arkansas
- Coordinates: 34°33′28″N 90°54′44″W
- Built: 1917
- Architect: Craig, James Madison
- Architectural style: Colonial Revival, Bungalow/Craftsman
- NRHP reference No.: 97001513
- Added to NRHP: December 19, 1997

The Mayo House is a historic house at 302 Elm Street in Marvell, Arkansas. It is a 1 1/2-story wood-frame structure, clad in novelty siding, with a dormered hip roof. It was built in 1917 by H. B. Mayo, the developer of this residential subdivision, and occupied by his family 1917–20. The house is a locally distinctive rendition of Colonial Revival styling, with some Craftsman features. The east-facing front has a full-width single-story porch which wraps around to the north side, and is supported by seven fluted metal columns.

The house was listed on the National Register of Historic Places in 1997.

== See also ==
- National Register of Historic Places listings in Phillips County, Arkansas
