= Lynching of Owen Flemming =

1927 lynching of a Black man in Arkansas

Coordinates: 34°13′11″N 90°57′01″W

Owen Flemming or Flemings was an African-American man who was lynched by a mob near Mellwood, Arkansas, on June 8, 1927, after an altercation with a white man who attempted to force him to work on a levee during the Great Mississippi Flood of 1927.

== Background, description of events ==
Flemming was one of many Black citizens who were forced to assist, often at gunpoint, with rescue operations and levee strengthening following the Great Mississippi Flood of 1927. White officials rounded up Black citizens of all layers of society (including business men, doctors, and preachers) and put them to work strengthening levees. According to the Pittsburgh Courier, a national African-American weekly newspaper, the Black laborers were coerced to work without food and many were not allowed to change into workwear. White citizens were excluded from partaking in this labor. Nonetheless, according to the Courier, some white men "volunteered to go down and help force the Negroes to work with the aid of a shot gun." In Helena, Arkansas, white police officers walked into a Black church during the service and made the men of the congregation work on the levees.

Flemming, about whom little is known, was among the forced laborers. According to researcher Nancy Snell Griffith in the Encyclopedia of Arkansas, various articles describe Flemming as "a prominent black man." The Courier describes Flemming as a "well-to-do race man of this city." The Arkansas Gazette reports that, at the Barton refugee camp, the officials described him as "a bad negro, continually shirking work." Flemming was coerced to work near Mellwood, Arkansas, an unincorporated community some 35 miles (56 km) from Helena.

According to the Courier, Flemming was already working, forcibly, on the levee when he was ordered by a plantation overseer, Roy Waters, to retrieve the mules of the plantation owner, in an area that had flooded. Flemming refused, killed Waters, and was then captured but not arrested: the Helena sheriff, J. D. Mays, was called by the plantation owner Woods, but supposedly said, "I'm busy. Just go ahead and lynch him." The Courier responded:

Along with other phrases, this will go down in history as one of the most notable ever delivered, for it conveyed into the hands of a white mob of 500 people, the living form of Owen Flemming, well-to-do race man of this city, and made of him one more sacrifice upon the bloody altar of the reign of this country's uncrowned sovereign—'King Lynch 'Em'.

A very different account came from the Gazette, which said that Roy Waters, the overseer, sent someone to fetch Flemming, who was in a boxcar, to come to the work site, but Flemming refused. Waters then went himself to Flemming, who shot him with a shotgun, and then shot him twice more with Waters's own pistol. (Alternately, Flemming wrestled with Waters, took Waters's pistol from him, and shot him, in self-defense.) Flemming then fled and hid in a tent, and was then surrounded by a posse (of some 500 people) and shot. According to the newspaper from Helena, his "wife and baby were summoned to the scene before the posse fired into the Negro's body."
