= Barton, Arkansas =

- Unincorporated community
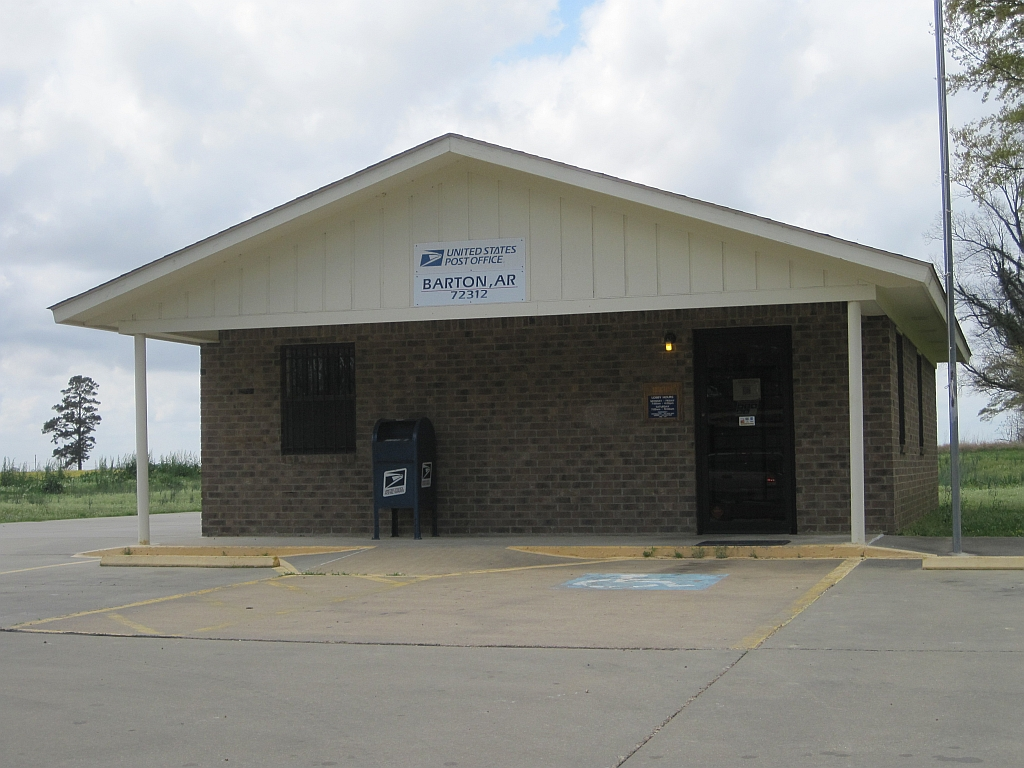

- Location within Arkansas Location within the United States
- Coordinates: 34°32′51″N 90°46′05″W
- Country: United States
- State: Arkansas
- County: Phillips
- Elevation: 207 ft (63 m)
- Time zone: UTC-6 (Central (CST))
  - Summer (DST): UTC-5 (CDT)
- ZIP code: 72312
- Area code: 870
- GNIS feature ID: 57334

Barton is an unincorporated community in Phillips County, Arkansas, United States. Barton is located on Arkansas Highway 85, 3.5 miles (5.6 km) south-southwest of Lexa. Barton has a post office with ZIP code 72312.

== Education ==
Barton is home to the Barton–Lexa School District which provides early childhood, elementary and secondary education to more than 800 students in prekindergarten through grade 12. Students complete their studies at Barton High School.
