= Lake View School District =

Defunct school district in Arkansas, United States

Lake View School District #25 was a school district headquartered in Lake View, Arkansas. Its schools were Lake View Elementary School (K-6) and C. V. White High School (7-12).

In 1992, the school district sued the state government, accusing it of unevenly funding school districts. As a result of that lawsuit and others, in November 2002, the Arkansas Supreme Court decided that the state needed to increase the funding of public schools through new laws. Among the new laws written was one forcing school districts with under 350 students to consolidate into other school districts. In 2004, its final year of operation, the Lake View district had 136 students; the small size made the district eligible for forced consolidation. Until April 1, 2004, the district could have entered into a mutual agreement with another district, but it was unable to find a merger partner. The Arkansas Board of Education now had the power to force a consolidation. Clausey Myton, Henrietta Wilson, Irma Morehouse, and Everlene R. Tucker, respectively the superintendent, school board president, and two board members of the Lake View district, wrote a letter criticizing the forced consolidation, accusing the state of attacking "institutions of color and persons of color", and stating "The district has not waged a 14-year fight for equal treatment under the law for the purpose of kowtowing to the newest manifestation of state discrimination." On July 1, 2004, the district was consolidated into the Barton-Lexa School District.
