= Elaine School District =

Defunct school district in Arkansas, United States

The Elaine School District #30 was a school district headquartered in Elaine, Arkansas. Its territory is now within the Marvell-Elaine School District.

It included territory in Desha and Phillips counties.

== History ==
In 1979 the Desha County School District merged into the Elaine School District.

In 2006 Elaine School District parents and students filed a lawsuit against the State of Arkansas, trying to prevent the school district from being merged with the Marvell School District.

Effective on July 1, 2006, the districts merged, with Elaine folding into the Marvell district, forming the Marvell Elaine School District.

When the district existed, it operated Lucilia Wood Elementary School and Elaine High School.
