= First Baptist Church (Marvell, Arkansas) =

Historic church in Arkansas, United States

- U.S. National Register of Historic Places
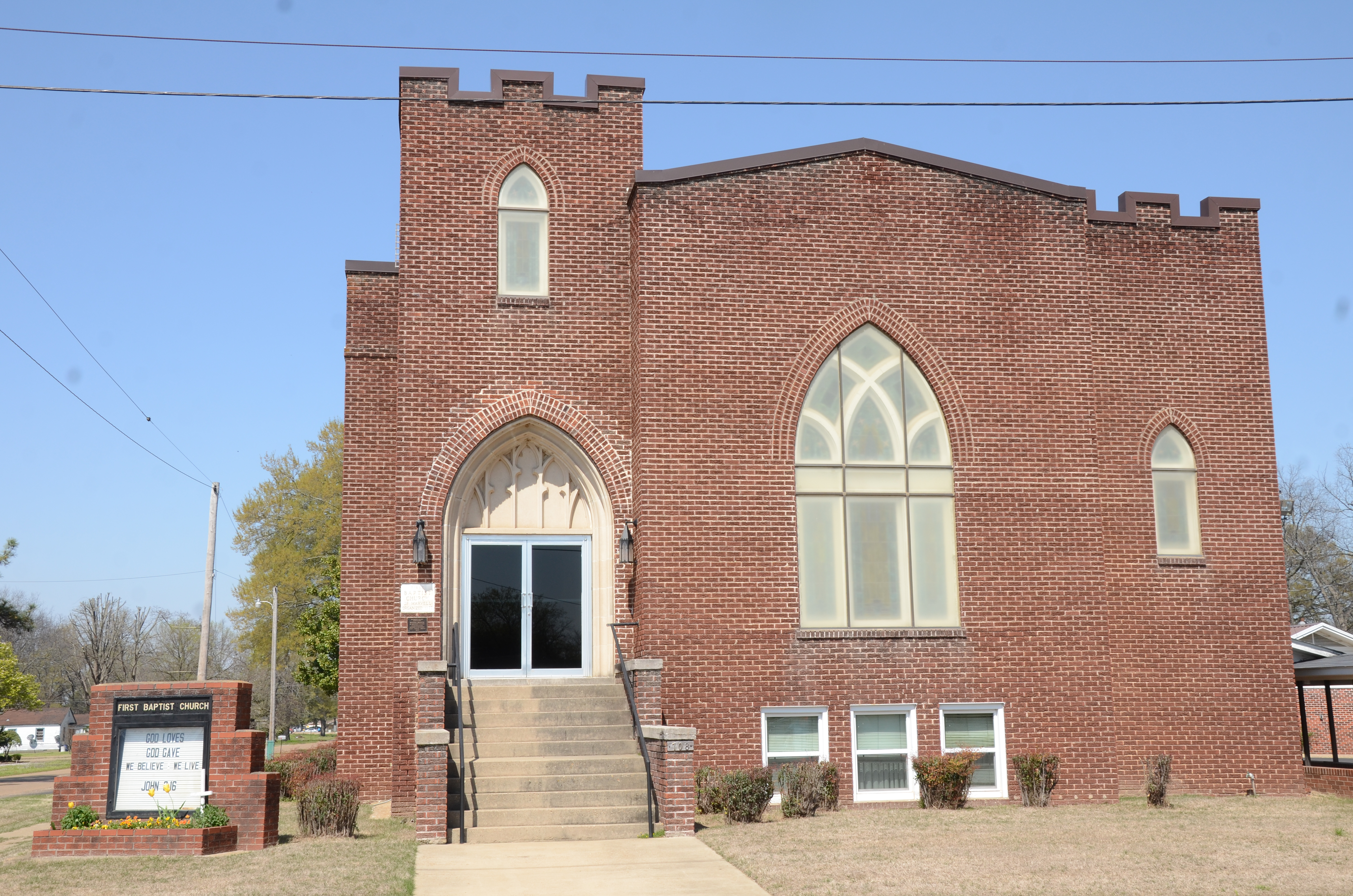

- Location within Arkansas Location within the United States
- Location: 708 Carruth Ave., Marvell, Arkansas
- Coordinates: 34°33′26″N 90°54′44″W
- Area: less than one acre
- Built: 1925
- Architectural style: Vernacular Collegiate Gothic
- NRHP reference No.: 91000587
- Added to NRHP: May 13, 1991

The First Baptist Church is a historic church at the junction of Pine and Carruth Streets in Marvell, Arkansas. It is a large brick masonry structure, with vernacular Collegiate Gothic features. Its main sanctuary and vestibule area occupy the full width and height of the building, while at the northern end there are two stories of offices. The building has a flat roof set behind a brick parapet. Its main facade is divided into three sections, with the main entrance in the western tower-like section. The central bay has a large wood-frame Gothic window, while the flanking bays both have Gothic-arched windows at the second level. The congregation was founded in 1877, and this is its second building. It is the only Collegiate Gothic building in Marvell.

The building was listed on the National Register of Historic Places in 1991.

== See also ==
- National Register of Historic Places listings in Phillips County, Arkansas
