= David Hillman (politician) =

American politician

Member of the Arkansas House of Representatives from the 13th district
- In office January 14, 2013 – January 9, 2023
- Preceded by: Clark Hall
- Succeeded by: Scott Richardson

Personal details
- Party: Republican (2016–present); Democratic (2012–2016)
- Education: Ouachita Baptist University

David Webster Hillman (born c. 1944) is an American politician from Almyra, Arkansas, who is a Republican member of the Arkansas House of Representatives. He represented District 13 in the southeastern portion of his state from January 14, 2013 to January 9, 2023.

Elected as a Democrat in all past elections, Hillman announced his change to the Republican Party on November 22, 2016.

== Education ==
Hillman graduated from Ouachita Baptist University in Arkadelphia, Arkansas.

== 2012 Election ==
When District 13 Representative Clark Hall ran for United States House of Representatives and left the seat open, Hillman was unopposed for the May 22, 2012, Democratic Primary, and won the November 6, 2012, General election with 4,897 votes (51.1%) against Republican nominee Garland Derden.

== 2022 Election ==
After the Arkansas Legislature changed the Arkansas House of Representatives map due to redistricting as a result of the 2020 US Census, Hillman decided to run as the incumbent Republican representative in the new 61st district (having changed his political identification from Democratic to Republican in 2016). He was defeated in the Republican primary on May 24 by Jeremiah Moore, a real estate broker and political newcomer, 57%-30%.
