= Barton–Lexa School District =

School district in Arkansas, United States

Address
- 9546 Highway 85 South Lexa, Arkansas, 72355; United States

District information
- Type: Public
- Grades: PreK–12
- NCES District ID: 0502730

Students and staff
- Students: 713
- Teachers: 63.03
- Staff: 61.03
- Student–teacher ratio: 11.31

Other information
- Website: www.bartonsd.org

Barton–Lexa School District is a public school district based in Phillips County, Arkansas. The school district supports early childhood, elementary and secondary education in prekindergarten through grade 12 for more than 800 students and employs more than 100 faculty and staff for its two schools. The school district encompasses 151.95 square miles (393.5 km^{2}) of land, and serves all of Barton, as well as the municipalities of Lexa and Lake View, and the census-designated place of Oneida.

On July 1, 2004, the Lake View School District was consolidated into the Barton–Lexa School District.

== Schools ==
- Barton High School, serving grades 7 through 12.
- Barton Elementary School, serving prekindergarten through grade 6.
