= Oneida, Arkansas =

- Census-designated place
- Location within Arkansas Location within the United States
- Coordinates: 34°27′38″N 90°47′12″W
- Country: United States
- State: Arkansas
- County: Phillips
- Elevation: 167 ft (51 m)

Population (2020)
  - Total: 13
- Time zone: UTC-6 (Central (CST))
  - Summer (DST): UTC-5 (CDT)
- ZIP code: 72369
- Area code: 870
- GNIS feature ID: 2805671

Oneida is an unincorporated community and census-designated place (CDP) in Phillips County, Arkansas, United States. Oneida is located along Arkansas Highway 85, 3.5 miles (5.6 km) north-northeast of Lake View. Oneida has a post office with ZIP code 72369. It was first listed as a CDP in the 2020 census with a population of 13.

== Demographics ==
Historical population
| Census | Pop. | Note | %± |
|---|---|---|---|
| 2020 | 13 | | — |
U.S. Decennial Census; 2020

=== 2020 census ===
Oneida CDP, Arkansas – Racial and ethnic composition Note: the US Census treats Hispanic/Latino as an ethnic category. This table excludes Latinos from the racial categories and assigns them to a separate category. Hispanics/Latinos may be of any race.
| Race / Ethnicity (NH = Non-Hispanic) | Pop 2020 | % 2020 |
|---|---|---|
| White alone (NH) | 6 | 46.15% |
| Black or African American alone (NH) | 6 | 46.15% |
| Native American or Alaska Native alone (NH) | 0 | 0.00% |
| Asian alone (NH) | 0 | 0.00% |
| Pacific Islander alone (NH) | 0 | 0.00% |
| Some Other Race alone (NH) | 0 | 0.00% |
| Mixed Race or Multi-Racial (NH) | 1 | 7.69% |
| Hispanic or Latino (any race) | 0 | 0.00% |
| Total | 13 | 100.00% |

== Education ==
It is in the Barton-Lexa School District. Its zoned high school is Barton High School.
