= Marvell–Elaine School District =

School district in Arkansas, United States

Address
- 203 S Pine Street Marvell, Arkansas, 72366; United States

District information
- Type: Public
- Grades: PreK–12
- NCES District ID: 0509510

Students and staff
- Students: 344
- Teachers: 28.46
- Staff: 36.4
- Student–teacher ratio: 12.09

Other information
- Website: www.mesd1.org

The Marvell–Elaine School District #22 (MESD) previously Marvell School District No. 22, is a school district headquartered in Marvell, Arkansas. It serves Marvell, Elaine, and other areas in Phillips and Desha counties.

On July 1, 2006, the Elaine School District merged into the Marvell School District.

In 2008–2009 the school district had a total of 595 square miles (1,540 km^{2}) of land.

Under a previous law, circa 2023, the district had the possibility of a mandatory consolidation due to a smaller demographic figure. By 2023 the Arkansas LEARNS Act allowed for smaller school districts to continue operations.

== Facilities ==
The district administration building is directly behind a Citgo gas station, near the intersection of U.S. Highway 49 and North Pine.

- Marvell Primary School, serving prekindergarten through grade 5.
- Marvell High School, serving grades 6 through 12.

Both are located on U.S. Route 49, the main highway passing through Marvell.
