= Barton High School =

Location
- 9546 AR 85 South; Barton, Arkansas; United States
- Coordinates: 34°33′8″N 90°46′2″W

Information
- Type: Public
- School district: Barton–Lexa School District
- CEEB code: 040105
- NCES School ID: 050273000040
- Dean: Chris Williams
- Principal: Megan Guthrie
- Head of school: Bruce Guthrie
- Faculty: 26.02 (on FTE basis)
- Grades: 7–12
- Enrollment: 308 (2023-2024)
- Student to teacher ratio: 11.84
- Colors: Maroon and white
- Athletics conference: 3A Region 2
- Mascot: Bear
- Team name: Barton Bears
- Rival: N/A
- Website: www.bartonsd.org/page/highschool

Barton High School is a comprehensive public high school serving students in grades 7 through 12 in Barton, Arkansas, United States. It is the sole high school administered by the Barton–Lexa School District.

The district boundary includes Lexa, Lake View, and Oneida.

== Academics ==
The assumed course of study follows the Smart Core curriculum developed by the Arkansas Department of Education (ADE). Students engage in regular (core and career focus) courses and exams and may select Advanced Placement (AP) coursework and exams that provide an opportunity for college credit.

== Athletics ==
The Barton High School mascot and athletic emblem is the Bear with maroon and white as the school colors.

For 2012–14, the Barton Bears compete in the state's 3A Classification within the 3A Region 2 Conference of the Arkansas Activities Association. The Pointers engage in numerous interscholastic activities, including football, golf (boys/girls), basketball (boys/girls), cheer, speech, baseball, softball, and track (boys/girls)

- Football: The Barton Bears football team is one of the state's most storied and successful program's, winning four consecutive state championships and eight total state football championships (1978, 1986, 1987, 1988, 1989, 1993, 1994, 1997). Between 1985 and 1990 Barton won 63 consecutive games, a streak no other school in Arkansas has come close to matching. Between 1993 and 1995 Barton had another win streak of 38 consecutive victories. The teams were led by legendary coach Frank McClellan (1970-05), who won a state-record 346 games in his thirty-five years as head coach at Barton, 367 total wins in thirty-eight seasons. McClellan has since been inducted into the Arkansas Sports Hall of Fame, and is one of only two Arkansas high school football coaches to ever be inducted into the National High School Hall of Fame, along with former Little Rock Central coach Earl Quigley. All eight of McClellan's state championship teams were undefeated and untied, and he also had eleven other teams finish with only one loss.
- Softball: The Lady Bears won a state (slowpitch) softball championship in 1996.
- Track and field: The boys track teams are 2-time state track champions (1994, 2001). The girls team won a state track championship in 1995.
- Basketball: The boys basketball team won a state basketball championship in 2026.
