= Modoc, Arkansas =

- Unincorporated community
- Location within Arkansas Location within the United States
- Coordinates: 34°20′09″N 90°46′46″W
- Country: United States
- State: Arkansas
- County: Phillips
- Elevation: 167 ft (51 m)
- Time zone: UTC-6 (Central (CST))
  - Summer (DST): UTC-5 (CDT)
- Area code: 870
- GNIS feature ID: 58201

Modoc is an unincorporated community in Phillips County, Arkansas, United States. It is not recognized by the United States Census Bureau.

Modoc is mentioned in the song "Caledonia Mission", written by Robbie Robertson and performed by The Band on their 1968 debut album Music from Big Pink.
