= Lambrook, Arkansas =

- Unincorporated community
- Location within Arkansas Location within the United States
- Coordinates: 34°20′08″N 90°58′03″W
- Country: United States
- State: Arkansas
- County: Phillips
- Elevation: 161 ft (49 m)
- Time zone: UTC-6 (Central (CST))
  - Summer (DST): UTC-5 (CDT)
- ZIP code: 72353
- Area code: 870
- GNIS feature ID: 58044

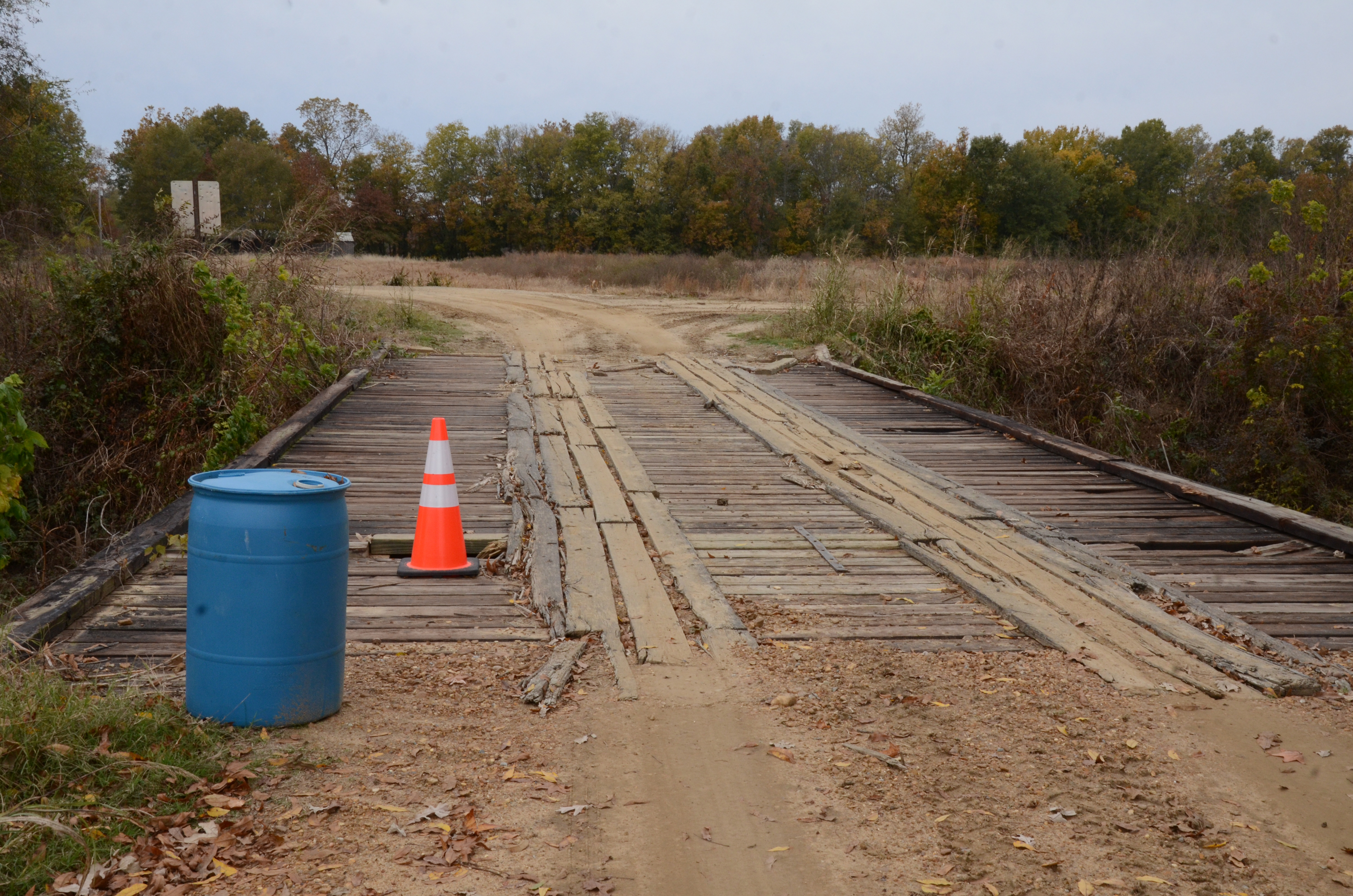
Warrens Bridge in Lambrook

Lambrook is an unincorporated community in Phillips County, Arkansas, United States. Lambrook is located on Arkansas Highway 20, 7 miles (11 km) west-northwest of Elaine. Lambrook has a post office with ZIP code 72353.
