= Lexa, Arkansas =

- Town
- Location of Lexa in Phillips County, Arkansas.
- Coordinates: 34°35′51″N 90°45′02″W
- Country: United States
- State: Arkansas
- County: Phillips

Area
  - Total: 0.41 sq mi (1.06 km^{2})
  - Land: 0.41 sq mi (1.06 km^{2})
  - Water: 0 sq mi (0.00 km^{2})
- Elevation: 207 ft (63 m)

Population (2020)
  - Total: 207
  - Estimate (2025): 178 ▼
  - Density: 504.5/sq mi (194.78/km^{2})
- Time zone: UTC-6 (Central (CST))
  - Summer (DST): UTC-5 (CDT)
- ZIP code: 72355
- Area code: 870
- FIPS code: 05-39670
- GNIS feature ID: 2406012

Lexa is a town in northern Phillips County, Arkansas, United States. As of the 2020 census, Lexa had a population of 207.

== Geography ==
According to the United States Census Bureau, the city has a total area of 0.4 square miles (1.0 km^{2}), all land.

== Climate ==
The climate in this area is characterized by hot, humid summers and generally mild to cool winters. According to the Köppen Climate Classification system, Lexa has a humid subtropical climate, abbreviated "Cfa" on climate maps.

== Demographics ==
Historical population
Census	Pop.	Note	%±
1990	295		—
2000	331		12.2%
2010	286		−13.6%
2020	207		−27.6%
2025 (est.)	178	▼	−14.0%
U.S. Decennial Census

As of the census of 2000, there were 331 people, 132 households, and 97 families residing in the city. The population density was 879.8 inhabitants per square mile (339.7/km^{2}). There were 139 housing units at an average density of 369.5 per square mile (142.7/km^{2}). The racial makeup of the city was 71.90% White, 26.28% Black or African American, 0.60% Native American, and 1.21% from two or more races.

There were 132 households, out of which 34.1% had children under the age of 18 living with them, 53.0% were married couples living together, 17.4% had a female householder with no husband present, and 26.5% were non-families. 25.8% of all households were made up of individuals, and 17.4% had someone living alone who was 65 years of age or older. The average household size was 2.51 and the average family size was 2.98.

In the city the population was spread out, with 26.6% under the age of 18, 5.4% from 18 to 24, 28.1% from 25 to 44, 22.4% from 45 to 64, and 17.5% who were 65 years of age or older. The median age was 40 years. For every 100 females, there were 89.1 males. For every 100 females age 18 and over, there were 78.7 males.

The median income for a household in the city was $30,446, and the median income for a family was $31,339. Males had a median income of $27,361 versus $20,417 for females. The per capita income for the city was $12,168. About 13.3% of families and 17.7% of the population were below the poverty line, including 19.5% of those under age 18 and 31.4% of those age 65 or over.

== Education ==
The Barton–Lexa School District provides early childhood, elementary and secondary education to more than 800 students in prekindergarten through grade 12 at is two schools. Students complete their studies at Barton High School.

== Notable people ==
- Gene Bearden, born in Lexa, major league baseball player
- Maudie Hopkins: last documented widow of a Confederate soldier.
- Samuel L. Kountz, kidney transplantation surgeon
