= Lake View, Arkansas =

- Location of Lake View in Phillips County, Arkansas.
- Coordinates: 34°25′16″N 90°48′48″W
- Country: United States
- State: Arkansas
- Counties: Phillips

Area
  - Total: 5.00 sq mi (12.96 km^{2})
  - Land: 5.00 sq mi (12.96 km^{2})
  - Water: 0 sq mi (0.00 km^{2})
- Elevation: 167 ft (51 m)

Population (2020)
  - Total: 327
  - Estimate (2025): 284 ▼
  - Density: 65.3/sq mi (25.23/km^{2})
- FIPS code: 05-38110
- GNIS feature ID: 2404867

Lake View is a city in Phillips County, Arkansas, United States. As of the 2020 census, Lake View had a population of 327. There is also a Lakeview in Baxter County. The original settlement name was "Turkey Scratch" from the 1850s until the town was renamed in the 1920s. When the town was re-established in 1937, Lake View became one of three communities in Arkansas to be reserved for black farm families by the Resettlement Administration. It is one of the few communities in the U.S. with an African-American percentage at over 90 percent of the population.

== Geography ==
According to the United States Census Bureau, the city has a total area of 5.0 square miles (13 km^{2}), all land.

== Demographics ==
Historical population
Census	Pop.	Note	%±
1980	609		—
1990	526		−13.6%
2000	531		1.0%
2010	443		−16.6%
2020	327		−26.2%
2025 (est.)	284	▼	−13.1%
U.S. Decennial Census

=== 2020 census ===
Lake View, Arkansas – Racial and ethnic composition Note: the US Census treats Hispanic/Latino as an ethnic category. This table excludes Latinos from the racial categories and assigns them to a separate category. Hispanics/Latinos may be of any race.
Race / Ethnicity (NH = Non-Hispanic)	Pop 2000	Pop 2010	Pop 2020	% 2000	% 2010	2020
White alone (NH)	37	23	18	6.97%	5.19%	5.50%
Black or African American alone (NH)	487	411	305	91.71%	92.78%	93.27%
Native American or Alaska Native alone (NH)	0	0	0	0.00%	0.00%	0.00%
Asian alone (NH)	0	0	0	0.00%	0.00%	0.00%
Native Hawaiian or Pacific Islander alone (NH)	0	0	0	0.00%	0.00%	0.00%
Other race alone (NH)	0	0	0	0.00%	0.00%	0.00%
Mixed race or Multiracial (NH)	6	5	3	1.13%	1.13%	0.92%
Hispanic or Latino (any race)	1	4	1	0.19%	0.90%	0.31%
Total	531	443	327	100.00%	100.00%	100.00%

As of the census of 2000, there were 531 people, 177 households, and 136 families residing in the city. The population density was 105.6 inhabitants per square mile (40.8/km^{2}). There were 222 housing units at an average density of 44.2 per square mile (17.1/km^{2}). The racial makeup of the city was 7.16% White, 91.71% African American, and 1.13% from two or more races. Hispanic or Latino of any race were 0.19% of the population.

There were 177 households, out of which 38.4% had children under the age of 18 living with them, 29.4% were married couples living together, 41.2% had a female householder with no husband present, and 22.6% were non-families. 20.3% of all households were made up of individuals, and 9.6% had someone living alone who was 65 years of age or older. The average household size was 3.00 and the average family size was 3.47.

In the city, the population was spread out, with 35.8% under the age of 18, 9.2% from 18 to 24, 21.8% from 25 to 44, 21.3% from 45 to 64, and 11.9% who were 65 years of age or older. The median age was 30 years. For every 100 females, there were 72.4 males. For every 100 females age 18 and over, there were 73.1 males.

The median income for a household in the city was $15,536, and the median income for a family was $16,944. Males had a median income of $17,031 versus $14,444 for females. The per capita income for the city was $13,651. About 45.2% of families and 45.6% of the population were below the poverty line, including 57.4% of those under age 18 and 40.6% of those age 65 or over.

== Education ==
The Barton–Lexa School District provides early childhood, elementary and secondary education to more than 800 students in prekindergarten through grade 12 at is two schools. Students complete their studies at Barton High School.

It was previously served by the Lake View School District, which operated Lake View Elementary School (K-6) and C. V. White High School (7-12). On July 1, 2004, it was consolidated into the Barton-Lexa School District.
