= Elaine, Arkansas =

- City
- Location of Elaine in Phillips County, Arkansas.
- Coordinates: 34°18′31″N 90°51′12″W
- Country: United States
- State: Arkansas
- County: Phillips

Area
  - Total: 0.51 sq mi (1.32 km^{2})
  - Land: 0.51 sq mi (1.32 km^{2})
  - Water: 0 sq mi (0.00 km^{2})
- Elevation: 167 ft (51 m)

Population (2020)
  - Total: 509
  - Estimate (2025): 434 ▼
  - Density: 995.0/sq mi (384.19/km^{2})
- Time zone: UTC-6 (Central (CST))
  - Summer (DST): UTC-5 (CDT)
- ZIP code: 72333
- Area code: 870
- FIPS code: 05-20950
- GNIS feature ID: 2403548
- Website: cityofelainear.org

Elaine is a small town in Phillips County, Arkansas, United States, in the Arkansas Delta region of the Mississippi River. The population was 509 at the 2020 census.

The city is best known as the location of the Elaine massacre of September 30 – October 1, 1919, in which an estimated 237 Black people were murdered in the rural county by rampaging white mobs. Five whites died in the events. This was one of the worst incidents of racial and labor violence in American history. Black sharecroppers were attempting to organize a farmers' union, which the planters resisted.

== History ==
Phillips County was developed in the antebellum years for cotton plantations, which relied on the labor of enslaved African Americans. Their work produced the wealth of the major large planters. Cotton continued to be the major commodity crop into the 20th century in this area but, after the war, blacks often had to work as sharecroppers or tenant farmers. By the turn of the century, Arkansas and other southern states had disenfranchised most blacks, excluding them from the political system, and imposed Jim Crow laws.

Black sharecroppers began to try to organize a farmers' union after World War I. They were seeking better payment and accounting from white landowners of the area cotton plantations. Whites resisted any change and often tried to break up their meetings.

On September 30, 1919, two white men, including a local deputy, tried to break up a meeting of Black sharecroppers who were trying to organize a farmers' union. After a white deputy was killed in a confrontation with guards at the meeting, word spread to town and around the area. Hundreds of whites from Phillips and neighboring areas rushed to suppress the Black communities, and started attacking the Black community at large. Governor Charles Hillman Brough requested federal troops to stop what was called the Elaine massacre. White mobs spread throughout the county, murdering an estimated 237 blacks before most of the violence was suppressed after October 1. Five whites also died in the incident. The governor accompanied the troops to the scene; their use had been approved by U.S. President Woodrow Wilson. Sharecroppers generally remained at a disadvantage in dealing with white landowners.

The county continues to rely on agriculture, but mechanization reduced the need for farm labor. Many African Americans left this area in the Great Migration of the early 20th century. In the 21st century, most farms are industrial scale. Some seasonal Hispanic migrant workers have been hired in this area since the late 20th century.

At 6:15 PM, April 26, 2011, a tornado – part of the 2011 Super Outbreak – hit the Elaine area. The tornado was rated EF0, with estimated wind speeds of 75 miles per hour (121 km/h; 65 kn). The tornado's path of destruction was 200 yards (180 m) wide and the tornado traveled a path of 21.5 miles (34.6 km) along Highway 61 and across the Mississippi state line, ending near Lula, Mississippi. Most of the tornado's damage was concentrated in Friars Point and Coahoma, Mississippi.

== Geography ==
According to the United States Census Bureau, the city has a total area of 0.5 square miles (1.3 km^{2}), all land.

== Demographics ==
Historical population
Census	Pop.	Note	%±
1920	377		—
1930	511		35.5%
1940	634		24.1%
1950	744		17.4%
1960	898		20.7%
1970	1,210		34.7%
1980	991		−18.1%
1990	846		−14.6%
2000	865		2.2%
2010	636		−26.5%
2020	509		−20.0%
2025 (est.)	434	▼	−14.7%
U.S. Decennial Census

=== 2020 census ===
Elaine city, Arkansas – Racial and ethnic composition Note: the US Census treats Hispanic/Latino as an ethnic category. This table excludes Latinos from the racial categories and assigns them to a separate category. Hispanics/Latinos may be of any race.
Race / Ethnicity (NH = Non-Hispanic)	Pop 2000	Pop 2010	Pop 2020	% 2000	% 2010	% 2020
White alone (NH)	327	231	136	37.80%	36.32%	26.72%
Black or African American alone (NH)	470	385	359	54.34%	60.53%	70.53%
Native American or Alaska Native alone (NH)	0	0	0	0.00%	0.00%	0.00%
Asian alone (NH)	0	1	0	0.00%	0.16%	0.00%
Native Hawaiian or Pacific Islander alone (NH)	0	0	0	0.00%	0.00%	0.00%
Other race alone (NH)(NH)	0	0	0	0.00%	0.00%	0.00%
Mixed race or Multiracial (NH)	16	10	3	1.85%	1.57%	0.59%
Hispanic or Latino (any race)	52	9	11	6.01%	1.42%	2.16%
Total	865	636	509	100.00%	100.00%	100.00%

At the 2000 census there were 865 people in 330 households, including 222 families, in the city. The population density was 1,725.8 inhabitants per square mile (666.3/km^{2}). There were 356 housing units at an average density of 710.3 per square mile (274.2/km^{2}). The racial makeup of the city was 58.15% Black or African American, 39.08% White, 0.92% from other races, and 1.85% from two or more races. 6.01% of the population was Hispanic or Latino of any race. Agriculture includes rice production, which uses seasonal migrant laborers from Mexico and Latin America in the town, nearby Lake View, and the Helena area. Of the 330 households 31.8% had children under the age of 18 living with them, 34.2% were married couples living together, 30.3% had a female householder with no husband present, and 32.7% were non-families. 31.2% of households were one person and 18.5% were one person aged 65 or older. The average household size was 2.62 and the average family size was 3.31.

The age distribution was 31.8% under the age of 18, 10.8% from 18 to 24, 19.5% from 25 to 44, 21.2% from 45 to 64, and 16.8% 65 or older. The median age was 32 years. For every 100 females, there were 80.2 males. For every 100 females age 18 and over, there were 73.5 males.

The median household income was $19,479 and the median family income was $22,813. Males had a median income of $22,386 versus $18,056 for females. The per capita income for the city was $12,640. About 33.5% of families and 41.1% of the population were below the poverty line, including 59.1% of those under age 18 and 26.5% of those age 65 or over.

== Education ==
The Marvell–Elaine School District serves the community. Marvell Primary School and Marvell High School in Marvell serve Elaine.

Previously the Elaine School District served the community. On July 1, 2006, the Elaine district merged into the Marvell district. When the district existed, it operated Lucilia Wood Elementary School and Elaine High School.

== Notable people ==
- Levon Helm, musician
- John Hughey, country musician
- Jimmy McCracklin, blues musician, was born in Elaine
- Barry Williamson, Texas politician, was reared in Elaine.
- Richard Wright, author, resided in Elaine
