= Marvell, Arkansas =

- City
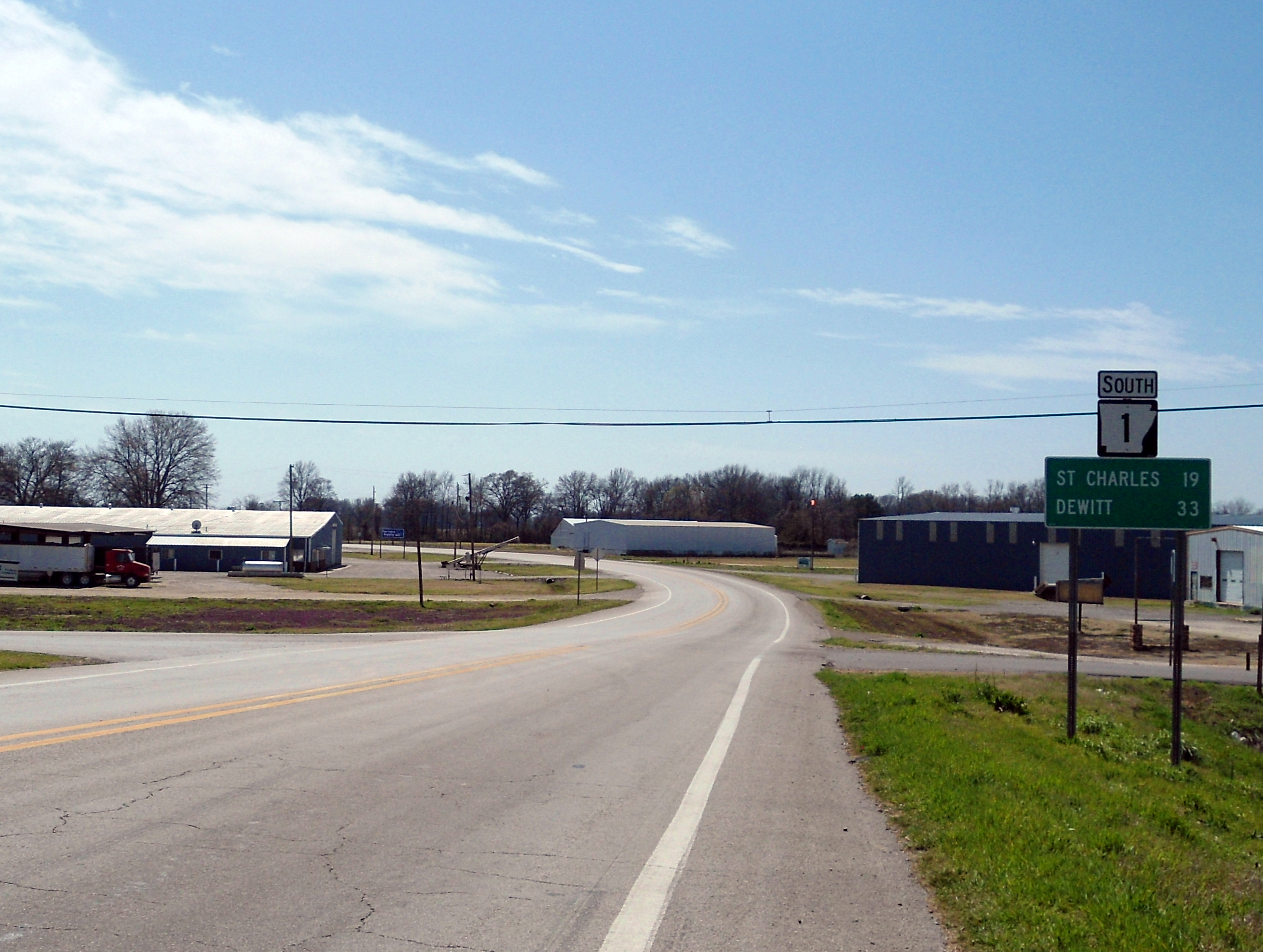
- Arkansas Highway 1 in Marvell

- Location of Marvell in Phillips County, Arkansas.
- Coordinates: 34°33′23″N 90°54′55″W
- Country: United States
- State: Arkansas
- County: Phillips

Area
  - Total: 1.44 sq mi (3.72 km^{2})
  - Land: 1.44 sq mi (3.72 km^{2})
  - Water: 0 sq mi (0.00 km^{2})
- Elevation: 210 ft (64 m)

Population (2020)
  - Total: 855
  - Estimate (2025): 717 ▼
  - Density: 595.3/sq mi (229.83/km^{2})
- Time zone: UTC-6 (Central (CST))
  - Summer (DST): UTC-5 (CDT)
- ZIP code: 72366
- Area code: 870
- FIPS code: 05-44420
- GNIS feature ID: 2405033

Marvell is a city in Phillips County, Arkansas, United States. As of the 2020 census, Marvell had a population of 855.

== History ==
Marvell was founded when Marvell M. Carruth and his wife, Rachel, sold 50 lots of land given to him by his father, Ladson Carruth, to the Arkansas Central Railroad. A train depot was soon established. Marvell became an un-incorporated town on May 28, 1873, with R.M. Jackson as its first mayor. Three years later, on October 3, 1876, Marvell became an incorporated town.

In 1877, the Union Trust foreclosed on the Arkansas Central Railroad and sold all of its assets at public auction.

On December 6, 1877, the Arkansas Midland Railway was formed. Under new ownership, the railroad became profitable, not only as a freight line, but also by providing daily passenger service from Clarendon to Brinkley and on to Helena, making stops in Marvell along the way. This service ran until 1952. The tracks which ran from Marvell to Holly Grove were abandoned in 1977.

In the early 1900s there were 15 different merchants in the city of Marvell. One of the stores that stayed in business the longest was A. Hirsch & Co., which did an immense mercantile business and owned valuable land in the area. The Garner Stave Company sold miscellaneous items, such as farming and manufacturing goods.

The Marvell Public Library was established in 1922 by Mrs. Dave McDonald, who remained active until her death. In 1925, the Marvell Bottling plant was built by James Williford, only to close shortly afterward due to the high cost and shortage of sugar. At the beginning of the Great Depression all banks in Phillips County closed, with the exception of the Bank of Marvell. County Judge E.P. Molitor, a Marvell native, began construction on a road connecting Helena to Clarendon in 1930.

In the 1980s, under the leadership of Mayor Alma Norton, the Marvell City Park and bike trail were built on the old railroad. The Davidson Park was also built and given to the city by the Abe Davidson family.

In the 1990s, the population of Marvell was approximately 1545. In 1997 cooperation with UAMS east and grant from federal government the city under mayor Clark Hall, the Marvell Medical Clinic was built with citizen donations. The clinic expanded in only one year to include dental services and interactive two-way compressed video use for medical consultations and health education.

Marvell was featured on ABC News's World News With Charles Gibson October 6, 2009, telecast as a center of infestation by newer pesticide-resistant strains of pigweed, threatening the region and raising the possibility of hand harvesting crops.

== Geography ==
According to the United States Census Bureau, the city has a total area of 1.4 square miles (3.6 km^{2}), all land.

== Demographics ==
Historical population
Census	Pop.	Note	%±
1880	177		—
1900	391		—
1910	556		42.2%
1920	781		40.5%
1930	624		−20.1%
1940	830		33.0%
1950	1,121		35.1%
1960	1,690		50.8%
1970	1,980		17.2%
1980	1,724		−12.9%
1990	1,545		−10.4%
2000	1,395		−9.7%
2010	1,186		−15.0%
2020	855		−27.9%
2025 (est.)	717	▼	−16.1%
U.S. Decennial Census

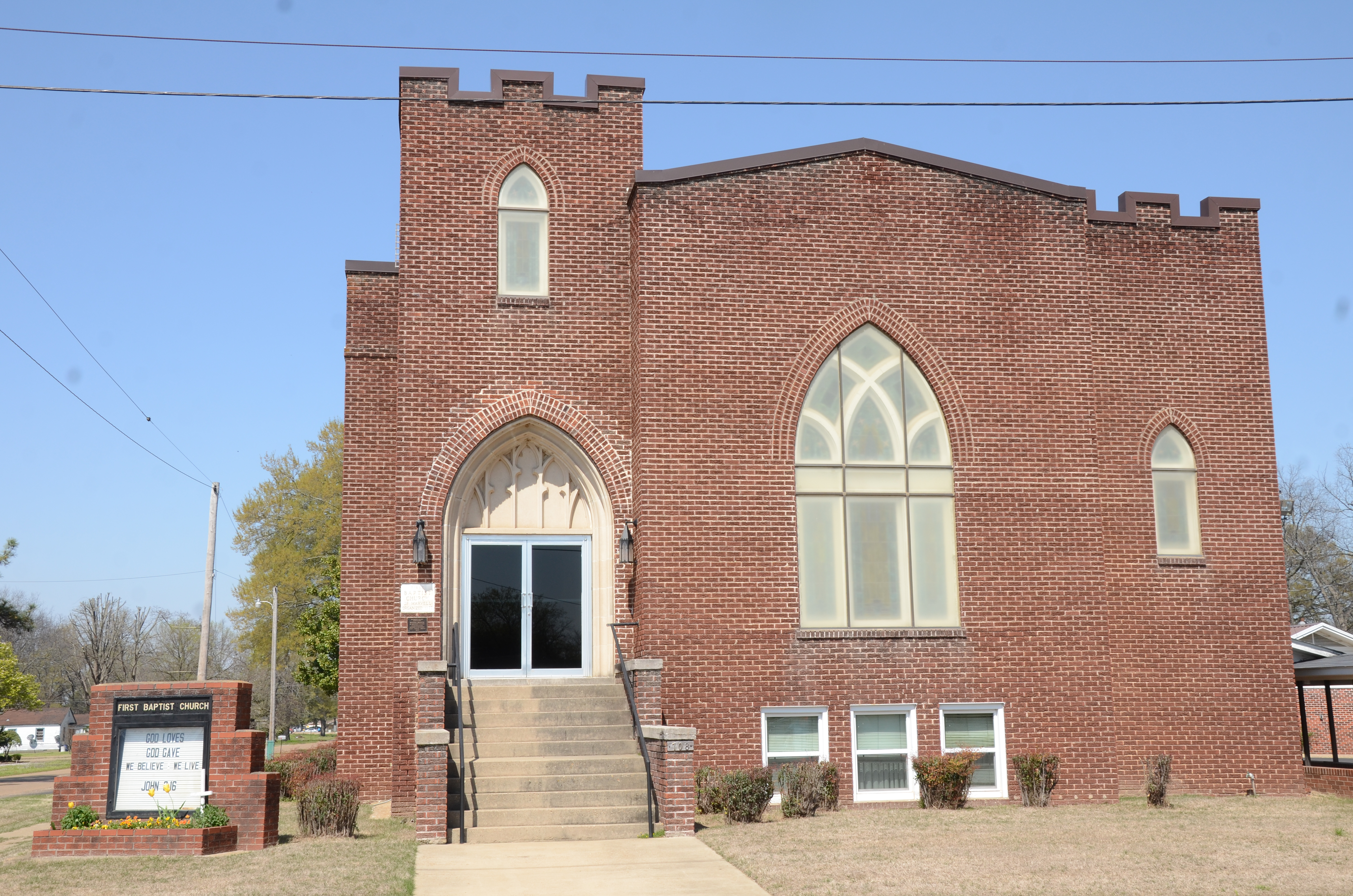

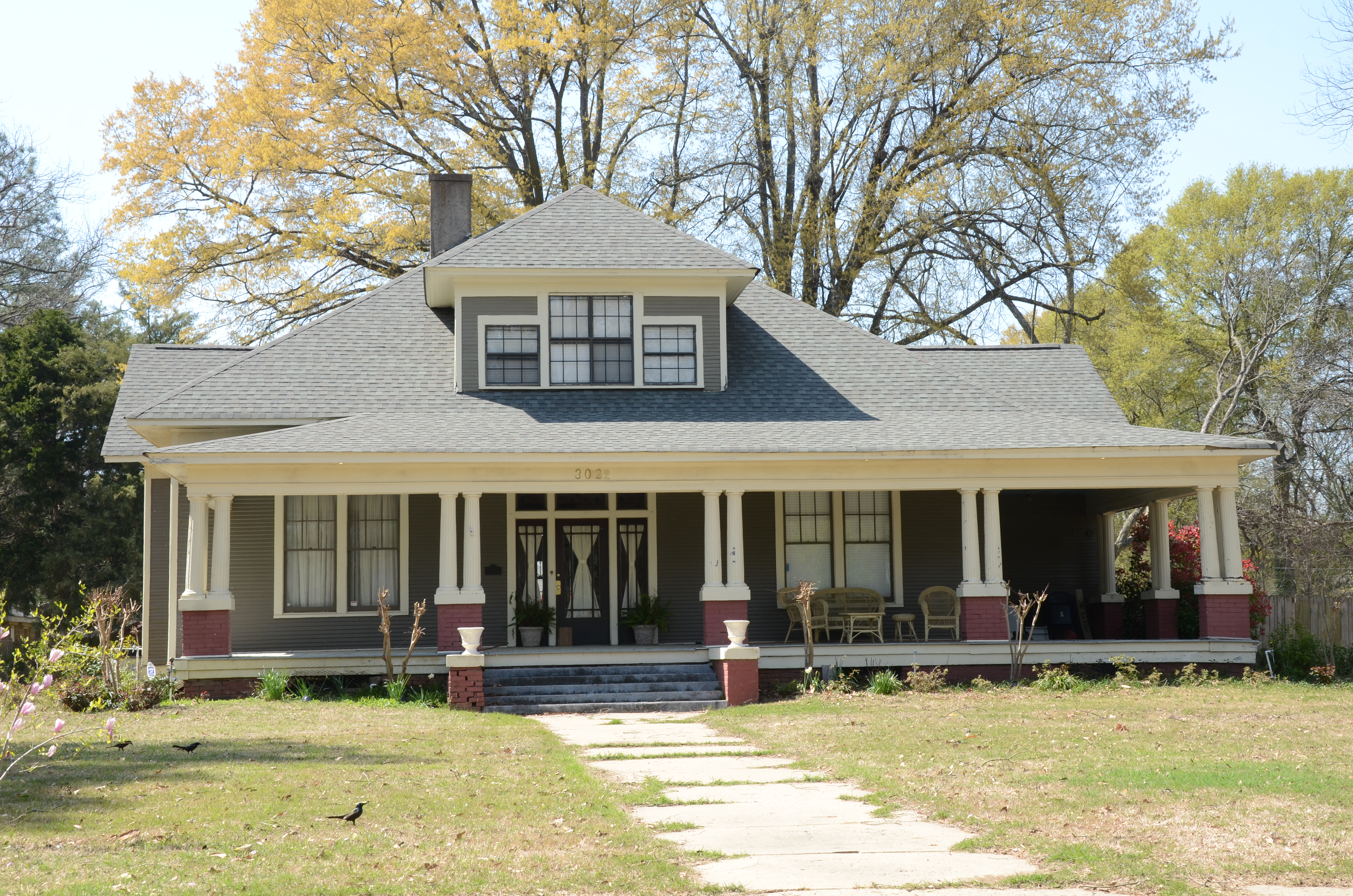
The First Baptist Church and the Mayo House in Marvell are listed on the National Register of Historic Places

=== 2020 Census ===
Marvell, Arkansas – Racial and ethnic composition Note: the US Census treats Hispanic/Latino as an ethnic category. This table excludes Latinos from the racial categories and assigns them to a separate category. Hispanics/Latinos may be of any race.
Race / Ethnicity (NH = Non-Hispanic)	Pop 2000	Pop 2010	Pop 2020	% 2000	% 2010	% 2020
White alone (NH)	561	416	288	40.22%	35.08%	33.68%
Black or African American alone (NH)	802	736	534	57.49%	62.06%	62.46%
Native American or Alaska Native alone (NH)	5	3	0	0.36%	0.25%	0.00%
Asian alone (NH)	0	2	1	0.00%	0.17%	0.12%
Pacific Islander alone (NH)	0	0	0	0.00%	0.00%	0.00%
Some Other Race alone (NH)	0	0	0	0.00%	0.00%	0.00%
Mixed Race or Multi-Racial (NH)	16	16	23	1.15%	1.35%	2.69%
Hispanic or Latino (any race)	11	13	9	0.79%	1.10%	1.05%
Total	1,395	1,186	855	100.00%	100.00%	100.00%

As of the census of 2000, there were 1,395 people, 547 households, and 358 families residing in the city. The population density was 1,024.5 inhabitants per square mile (395.6/km^{2}). There were 594 housing units at an average density of 436.3 per square mile (168.5/km^{2}). The racial makeup of the city was 58.06% Black or African American, 40.36% White, 0.43% Native American, and 1.15% from two or more races. 0.79% of the population were Hispanic or Latino of any race.

There were 547 households, out of which 31.1% had children under the age of 18 living with them, 37.1% were married couples living together, 25.6% had a female householder with no husband present, and 34.4% were non-families. 32.4% of all households were made up of individuals, and 18.1% had someone living alone who was 65 years of age or older. The average household size was 2.47 and the average family size was 3.14.

In the city, the population was spread out, with 30.6% under the age of 18, 7.2% from 18 to 24, 20.4% from 25 to 44, 21.5% from 45 to 64, and 20.3% who were 65 years of age or older. The median age was 38 years. For every 100 females, there were 80.0 males. For every 100 females age 18 and over, there were 68.9 males.

The median income for a household in the city was $22,368, and the median income for a family was $26,500. Males had a median income of $23,854 versus $15,764 for females. The per capita income for the city was $16,797. About 22.6% of families and 29.5% of the population were below the poverty line, including 48.1% of those under age 18 and 16.9% of those age 65 or over.

== Education ==
The Marvell–Elaine School District serves the community. The schools include Marvell Primary School and Marvell High School.

Marvell Academy, a private K3-12th grade school, is in unincorporated Phillips County, near Marvell. Marvell Academy was founded in 1966.

== Notable people ==
- Sam Carr, blues musician.
- Clark Hall, mayor, state representative, Phillips county judge
- Levon Helm, singer, drummer, actor

== See also ==
- List of cities in Arkansas
