= Phillips County, Arkansas =

County in Arkansas, United States

- County
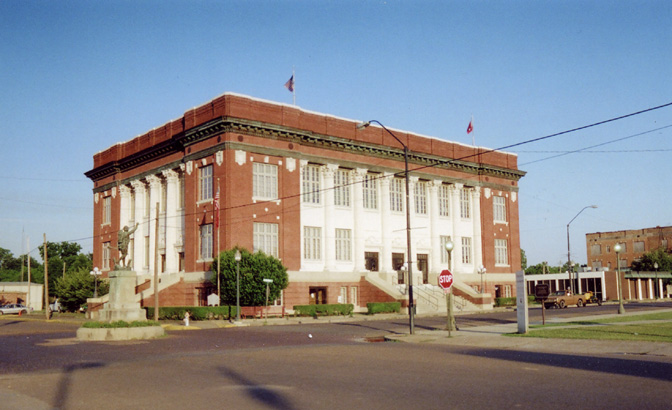
- Phillips County Courthouse in Helena-West Helena

- Location within the U.S. state of Arkansas
- Coordinates: 34°23′25″N 90°52′11″W
- Country: United States
- State: Arkansas
- Founded: May 1, 1820
- Named for: Sylvanus Phillips
- Seat: Helena-West Helena
- Largest city: Helena-West Helena

Area
  - Total: 727 sq mi (1,880 km^{2})
  - Land: 696 sq mi (1,800 km^{2})
  - Water: 32 sq mi (83 km^{2}) 4.4%

Population (2020)
  - Total: 16,568
  - Estimate (2025): 14,255 ▼
  - Density: 23.8/sq mi (9.19/km^{2})
- Time zone: UTC−6 (Central)
  - Summer (DST): UTC−5 (CDT)
- Congressional district: 1st
- Website: phillipscounty.arkansas.gov

Phillips County is a county located in the eastern part of the U.S. state of Arkansas, in what is known as the Arkansas Delta along the Mississippi River. As of the 2020 census, the population was 16,568. The county seat is Helena–West Helena. Phillips County is Arkansas's seventh (7th) county, formed on May 1, 1820. It was named for Sylvanus Phillips, the area's first-known white or European-American settler; he was elected as representative to the first Territorial Legislature of the Arkansas Territory. This fertile lowland area was developed for cotton plantations in the antebellum area and is still largely rural and agricultural. The Helena-West Helena, AR Micropolitan Statistical Area includes all of Phillips County.

== History ==
From September 30 – October 1, 1919, during the Elaine massacre in Phillips County, at least 237 African Americans were killed, attacked at large by armed whites trying to suppress the Progressive Farmers and Household Union of America which was organizing in the county. Because the white mob actions were racial terrorism against African Americans, the deaths were classified as lynchings by the Equal Justice Initiative in its 2015 report on lynchings in the South. Based on this, Phillips County ranks as the county with the highest number of lynchings in U.S. history.

== Crime ==
For the years from 2016 to 2020, Phillips County had the highest rate of gun homicides of any county in the United States. Adjusting county data for the age of the population, Phillips County had a rate of 55.45 gun deaths per 100,000 population.

== Geography ==
According to the U.S. Census Bureau, the county has a total area of 727 square miles (1,880 km^{2}), of which 696 square miles (1,800 km^{2}) is land and 32 square miles (83 km^{2}) (4.4%) is water.

=== Major highways ===
- U.S. Highway 49
- Highway 1
- Highway 20
- Highway 39
- Highway 85
- Highway 86
- Highway 149
- Highway 185
- Highway 242
- Highway 243
- Highway 316
- Highway 318

=== Adjacent counties ===
- Lee County (north)
- Tunica County, Mississippi (northeast)
- Coahoma County, Mississippi (east)
- Bolivar County, Mississippi (southeast)
- Desha County (south)
- Arkansas County (southwest)
- Monroe County (northwest)

=== National protected areas ===
- St. Francis National Forest (part)
- White River National Wildlife Refuge (part)

== Demographics ==
Historical population
Census	Pop.	Note	%±
1830	1,152		—
1840	3,547		207.9%
1850	6,935		95.5%
1860	14,877		114.5%
1870	15,372		3.3%
1880	21,262		38.3%
1890	25,341		19.2%
1900	26,561		4.8%
1910	33,535		26.3%
1920	44,530		32.8%
1930	40,683		−8.6%
1940	45,970		13.0%
1950	46,254		0.6%
1960	43,997		−4.9%
1970	40,046		−9.0%
1980	34,772		−13.2%
1990	28,838		−17.1%
2000	26,445		−8.3%
2010	21,757		−17.7%
2020	16,568		−23.8%
2025 (est.)	14,255	▼	−14.0%
U.S. Decennial Census; 1790–1960 1900–1990; 1990–2000 2010–2021

=== Racial and ethnic composition ===
Phillips County, Arkansas – Racial and ethnic composition Note: the US Census treats Hispanic/Latino as an ethnic category. This table excludes Latinos from the racial categories and assigns them to a separate category. Hispanics/Latinos may be of any race.
Race / Ethnicity (NH = Non-Hispanic)	Pop 1980	Pop 1990	Pop 2000	Pop 2010	Pop 2020	% 1980	% 1990	% 2000	% 2010	% 2020
White alone (NH)	15,998	12,793	10,245	7,535	5,541	46.01%	44.36%	38.74%	34.63%	33.44%
Black or African American alone (NH)	18,139	15,705	15,495	13,652	10,305	52.17%	54.46%	58.59%	62.75%	62.20%
Native American or Alaska Native alone (NH)	61	36	45	39	38	0.18%	0.12%	0.17%	0.18%	0.23%
Asian alone (NH)	99	65	80	64	64	0.28%	0.23%	0.30%	0.29%	0.39%
Native Hawaiian or Pacific Islander alone (NH)	x	x	2	1	4	x	x	0.01%	0.00%	0.02%
Other race alone (NH)	3	2	16	2	19	0.01%	0.01%	0.06%	0.01%	0.11%
Mixed race or Multiracial (NH)	x	x	180	177	333	x	x	0.68%	0.81%	2.01%
Hispanic or Latino (any race)	472	237	382	287	264	1.36%	0.82%	1.44%	1.32%	1.59%
Total	34,772	28,838	26,445	21,757	16,568	100.00%	100.00%	100.00%	100.00%	100.00%

=== 2020 census ===
As of the 2020 census, the county had a population of 16,568. The median age was 41.3 years. 25.6% of residents were under the age of 18 and 19.7% of residents were 65 years of age or older. For every 100 females there were 88.4 males, and for every 100 females age 18 and over there were 82.6 males age 18 and over.

The racial makeup of the county was 33.9% White, 62.4% Black or African American, 0.3% American Indian and Alaska Native, 0.4% Asian, <0.1% Native Hawaiian and Pacific Islander, 0.5% from some other race, and 2.5% from two or more races. Hispanic or Latino residents of any race comprised 1.6% of the population.

51.9% of residents lived in urban areas, while 48.1% lived in rural areas.

There were 6,890 households in the county, of which 31.0% had children under the age of 18 living in them. Of all households, 30.1% were married-couple households, 21.8% were households with a male householder and no spouse or partner present, and 42.4% were households with a female householder and no spouse or partner present. About 34.4% of all households were made up of individuals and 15.3% had someone living alone who was 65 years of age or older.

There were 8,315 housing units, of which 17.1% were vacant. Among occupied housing units, 54.4% were owner-occupied and 45.6% were renter-occupied. The homeowner vacancy rate was 2.5% and the rental vacancy rate was 10.8%.

=== 2010 census ===
As of the 2010 census, there were 21,757 people living in the county. 63.1% were Black or African American, 35.0% White, 0.3% Asian, 0.2% Native American, 0.4% of some other race and 0.9% of two or more races. 1.3% were Hispanic or Latino (of any race).

=== 2000 census ===
As of the 2000 census, there were 26,445 people, 9,711 households, and 6,768 families living in the county. The population density was 38 people per square mile (15 people/km^{2}). There were 10,859 housing units at an average density of 16 per square mile (6.2/km^{2}). The racial makeup of the county was 59.04% Black or African American, 39.25% White, 0.43% from other races, 0.32% Asian, 0.17% Native American, 0.01% Pacific Islander, and 0.78% from two or more races. 1.44% of the population were Hispanic or Latino of any race. At over 58% of the county's population, Phillips County has the highest percentage of African Americans in the state of Arkansas.

There were 9,711 households, out of which 34.20% had children under the age of 18 living with them, 40.30% were married couples living together, 25.10% had a female householder with no husband present, and 30.30% were non-families. 27.60% of all households were made up of individuals, and 13.00% had someone living alone who was 65 years of age or older. The average household size was 2.69 and the average family size was 3.29.

In the county, the population was spread out, with 32.20% under the age of 18, 9.40% from 18 to 24, 23.20% from 25 to 44, 21.20% from 45 to 64, and 13.90% who were 65 years of age or older. The median age was 33 years. For every 100 females there were 84.70 males. For every 100 females age 18 and over, there were 77.70 males.

The median income for a household in the county was $22,231, and the median income for a family was $26,570. Males had a median income of $24,675 versus $17,520 for females. The per capita income for the county was $12,288. About 28.70% of families and 32.70% of the population were below the poverty line, including 45.50% of those under age 18 and 26.20% of those age 65 or over.

For the period 2000–2009, the Helena-West Helena statistical area lost 20.89% of its population, the largest decline of any statistical area in the country.

== Government and politics ==
=== Government ===
The county government is a constitutional body granted specific powers by the Constitution of Arkansas and the Arkansas Code. The quorum court is the legislative branch of the county government and controls all spending and revenue collection. Representatives are called justices of the peace and are elected from county districts every even-numbered year. The number of districts in a county vary from nine to fifteen, and district boundaries are drawn by the county election commission. The Phillips County Quorum Court has nine members. Presiding over quorum court meetings is the county judge, who serves as the chief executive officer of the county. The county judge is elected at-large and does not vote in quorum court business, although capable of vetoing quorum court decisions.

Phillips County, Arkansas Elected countywide officials
Position	Officeholder	Party
County Judge	Clark Hall	Democratic
County Clerk	Shakira Winfield	Democratic
Circuit Clerk	Tamekia Franklin	Democratic
Sheriff/Collector	Neal Byrd, Sr.	Democratic
Treasurer	Santresa "Tot" Mayfield	Democratic
Assessor	Jerome Turner	Democratic
Coroner	Earnest Larry	Democratic

The composition of the Quorum Court following the 2024 elections is 8 Democrats and 1 Republican. Justices of the Peace (members) of the Quorum Court following the elections are:

- District 1: Edward Carter (D)
- District 2: Patrick Roberson (D)
- District 3: Oscar Hoskins (D)
- District 4: Isaac Ike Tribune (D)
- District 5: Betty Brimley (D)
- District 6: Shirley Moss-Larry (D)
- District 7: William Kyle Storer (D)
- District 8: Martin Rawls (R)
- District 9: Lita Moore-Johnson (D)

Additionally, the townships of Phillips County are entitled to elect their own respective constables, as set forth by the Constitution of Arkansas. Constables are largely of historical significance as they were used to keep the peace in rural areas when travel was more difficult. The township constables as of the 2024 elections are:

- Hornor: Wilburt Strotter (D)
- Marion: John Jason O'Neal (D)
- Spring Creek: Lewis Hall (D)
- Tappan: Edgar Williams III (D)

=== Politics ===
As a majority-black county, Phillips County is strongly Democratic. It has voted for the Democratic presidential candidate in all but two elections in the last century. Strom Thurmond carried the county in his whites-only Dixiecrat effort in 1948. At that time, Democrats were composed chiefly of conservative whites, as most blacks had been disenfranchised at the turn of the century. Prior to that, they had been affiliated with the Republican Party.

Richard Nixon carried the county in his 1972 landslide. Blacks were not yet voting in full force, following passage of the Voting Rights Act of 1965, as some states and counties continued to have ways to suppress their vote.

In modern times, heavy depopulation and the state's strong rightward shift has shrunk the margins for Democrats, though Black voters remain strongly Democratic and thus keep the county safely blue.

United States presidential election results for Phillips County, Arkansas
Year	Republican		Democratic		Third party(ies)	
Year	No.	%	No.	%	No.	%
1896	815	41.20%	1,085	54.85%	78	3.94%
1900	388	22.23%	1,349	77.31%	8	0.46%
1904	251	14.83%	1,434	84.75%	7	0.41%
1908	393	24.65%	1,194	74.91%	7	0.44%
1912	198	15.06%	926	70.42%	191	14.52%
1916	552	27.35%	1,466	72.65%	0	0.00%
1920	868	30.54%	1,965	69.14%	9	0.32%
1924	454	19.65%	1,785	77.27%	71	3.07%
1928	487	19.08%	2,061	80.76%	4	0.16%
1932	142	4.52%	2,976	94.66%	26	0.83%
1936	94	3.98%	2,259	95.60%	10	0.42%
1940	245	9.88%	2,235	90.12%	0	0.00%
1944	501	19.66%	2,046	80.30%	1	0.04%
1948	351	11.33%	1,018	32.85%	1,730	55.82%
1952	2,592	40.88%	3,741	59.01%	7	0.11%
1956	2,826	40.72%	3,917	56.44%	197	2.84%
1960	2,168	32.47%	4,105	61.48%	404	6.05%
1964	3,963	40.48%	5,818	59.43%	9	0.09%
1968	2,154	18.78%	5,039	43.92%	4,279	37.30%
1972	6,235	58.90%	4,283	40.46%	68	0.64%
1976	3,342	30.06%	7,774	69.93%	1	0.01%
1980	4,270	38.31%	6,642	59.59%	234	2.10%
1984	4,686	43.70%	5,946	55.45%	91	0.85%
1988	3,892	39.47%	5,580	56.59%	389	3.94%
1992	2,695	27.40%	6,456	65.63%	686	6.97%
1996	2,205	25.73%	5,715	66.69%	650	7.58%
2000	3,154	33.87%	6,018	64.62%	141	1.51%
2004	3,161	35.65%	5,642	63.62%	65	0.73%
2008	3,097	34.53%	5,695	63.50%	177	1.97%
2012	2,598	32.76%	5,202	65.60%	130	1.64%
2016	2,446	35.18%	4,310	61.99%	197	2.83%
2020	2,417	38.72%	3,623	58.04%	202	3.24%
2024	2,098	42.49%	2,754	55.77%	86	1.74%

== Education ==
School districts serving Phillips County include the Helena-West Helena School District, the Marvell–Elaine School District, and the Barton–Lexa School District.

Previously the Lake View School District served a portion of the county. On July 1, 2004, the Lake View district merged into the Barton–Lexa district. Previously the Elaine School District served another portion of the county. On July 1, 2006, the Elaine district merged into the Marvell district.

Marvell Academy, a private school founded in 1966 as a segregation academy, is in unincorporated Phillips County, near Marvell.

== Communities ==
=== Cities ===
- Elaine
- Helena–West Helena (county seat)
- Lake View
- Marvell

=== Town ===
- Lexa

=== Census-designated places ===
- Oneida
- Poplar Grove

=== Unincorporated places ===
- Barton
- Modoc
- Lambrook

=== Townships ===
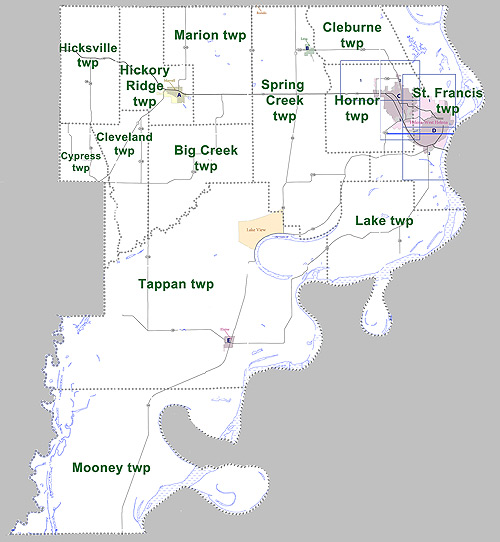
Townships in Phillips County, Arkansas as of 2010

Townships in Arkansas are the divisions of a county. Each township includes unincorporated areas; some may have incorporated cities or towns within part of their boundaries. Arkansas townships have limited purposes in modern times. However, the United States census does list Arkansas population based on townships (sometimes referred to as "county subdivisions" or "minor civil divisions"). Townships are also of value for historical purposes in terms of genealogical research. Each town or city is within one or more townships in an Arkansas county based on census maps and publications. The townships of Phillips County are listed below; listed in parentheses are the cities, towns, and/or census-designated places that are fully or partially inside the township.

Township	FIPS code	ANSI code (GNIS ID)	Population center(s)	Pop. (2010)	Pop. density (/mi^{2})	Pop. density (/km^{2})	Total area (mi^{2})	Total area (km^{2})	Land area (mi^{2})	Land area (km^{2})	Water area (mi^{2})	Water area (km^{2})	Geographic coordinates
Big Creek	05-90273	00068945		425	11.05	4.26	38.474	99.65	38.474	99.65	0	0.000	34.484468°N 90.893231°W
Cleburne	05-90849	00068946		660	29.12	11.24	22.692	58.77	22.665	58.70	0.027	0.06993	34.608847°N 90.690904°W
Cleveland	05-90870	00068947		198	8.01	3.09	24.731	64.05	24.722	64.03	0.009	0.02331	34.479487°N 90.971919°W
Cypress	05-91005	00068948		152	9.54	3.68	15.938	41.28	15.938	41.28	0	0.000	34.476511°N 91.018900°W
Hickory Ridge	05-91704	00068949	Marvell	1,550	49.89	19.26	31.10	80.55	31.066	80.46	0.034	0.08806	34.586411°N 90.936268°W
Hicksville	05-91707	00068950		231	6.99	2.70	33.046	85.59	33.046	85.59	0	0.000	34.586511°N 91.016744°W
Hornor	05-91767	00068951	part of Helena-West Helena	9,697	265.48	102.51	36.526	94.60	36.526	94.60	0	0.000	34.539980°N 90.679052°W
Lake	05-92094	00068953		41	0.91	0.35	50.741	131.4	44.870	116.2	5.871	15.21	34.410535°N 90.676788°W
Marion	05-92391	00068955		589	14.42	5.57	40.865	105.8	40.846	105.8	0.019	0.04921	34.597488°N 90.870256°W
Mooney	05-92547	00078865		179	1.70	0.66	115.059	298.0	105.231	272.5	9.828	25.45	34.191547°N 90.969308°W
St. Francis	05-93276	00068956	most of Helena-West Helena	4,746	103.10	39.82	53.971	139.8	46.034	119.2	7.937	20.56	34.539209°N 90.603521°W
Spring Creek	05-93462	00068958	Lexa, small part of Lake View	1,789	22.46	8.67	79.694	206.4	79.648	206.3	0.046	0.1191	34.527768°N 90.765687°W
Tappan	05-93573	00068959	Elaine, most of Lake View	1,500	8.49	3.28	184.506	477.9	176.595	457.4	7.911	20.49	34.343723°N 90.880168°W
Source: "Census 2010 U.S. Gazetteer Files: County Subdivisions in Arkansas". U.S. Census Bureau, Geography Division. Archived from the original on May 31, 2014. Source: "Census 2010 U.S. Gazetteer Files". U.S. Census Bureau, Geography Division.

== Notable people ==
- Bruce Bennett, Arkansas Attorney General
- Barry Williamson, attorney and member of the Texas Railroad Commission
- Blanche Lincoln, U.S. Senator
- Mark Lavon "Levon" Helm, drummer and singer for The Band
- Robert Lockwood Jr., blues guitarist and singer
- Angie Craig, U.S. Representative from Minnesota

== See also ==
- List of lakes in Phillips County, Arkansas
- National Register of Historic Places listings in Phillips County, Arkansas
