= Progressive Farmers and Household Union of America =

Union of African-American tenant farmers

The Progressive Farmers and Household Union of America was a union of African-American tenant farmers and sharecroppers, organized by Robert L. Hill. A meeting of this union near Elaine, Arkansas, was disrupted on the evening of September 30, 1919. The fatal shooting of a white man sparked retaliation by whites; hundreds poured into the area, attacking blacks on sight and resulting in the Elaine massacre, believed to be the deadliest in American history.

== Background ==
The Progressive Farmers and Household Union of America was formed by Robert L. Hill of Winchester, Arkansas, a black tenant farmer. He claimed chapters in 15 to 20 counties, and the union had several lodges in the Elaine area.

In late 1919 the union organized resistance among blacks in the Elaine area: black women stopped working in domestic positions in white households, and the union demanded higher wages for cotton pickers. The union had also hired lawyers at the state capital and planned to sue landlords for shares allegedly withheld from tenant farmers and sharecroppers.

== Elaine massacre ==
The union was largely destroyed by the violent riots and white repression that followed in Phillips County. Hundreds of whites formed militias to hunt down blacks throughout the county and suppress what they claimed was an "insurrection". The Governor of Arkansas, Charles Hillman Brough, led a detachment of federal troops into the county, and hundreds of blacks were arrested. A total of five whites and an estimated 100–237 blacks were killed in the following days, some by troops. Other blacks were required to have passes signed by military authorities and attested by a reputable white citizen in order to move about in public. In the week after the shooting, roving bands of whites and federal troops killed an estimated 100 to 200 blacks in the area.

After the violence, a grand jury, made up of all-white local landlords and merchants, decided who would be indicted. Those black men willing to testify against others and who agreed to work on whatever terms their landlords set for them were freed. Blacks labeled as ringleaders or who were judged "unreliable" were indicted. According to the affidavits later supplied by the defendants, many of the prisoners had been beaten, whipped or tortured by electric shocks to extract testimony or confessions; they were threatened with death if they were to recant such testimony.

Robert Hill escaped to the state of Kansas during the first days of the riot. He was arrested there but the governor refused to extradite him to Arkansas to face charges.

Some 122 blacks were indicted in Arkansas, with 73 charged with murder; no whites were prosecuted. Many suspects were beaten and tortured through electric shock to elicit forced testimony. The trials by all-white juries were dominated by armed whites milling around outside the courthouse, with some armed men inside the courtroom.

Twelve men were convicted of murder and sentenced to death. Their appeals took two tracks, with six men (Ware et al.) winning reversals of their convictions in state court; they were retried and convicted, but won another appeal in the state supreme court. They were released in 1923 under Arkansas law after the state failed to retry them within two years.

The convictions of the remaining six defendants (Moore et al.) were eventually reversed by the United States Supreme Court in Moore v. Dempsey 261 U.S. 86 (1923), on the basis of violation of their right to due process because of the conditions of the trial and related publicity. This was an important precedent for the Supreme Court to review state criminal trials through application of the Bill of Rights. The NAACP, which had helped fund and commission the defense team, strengthened its reputation for working on behalf of African Americans. Walter F. White, the NAACP field secretary who had investigated the riot in the field, gained renown for his reporting on the massacre, including its high number of black fatalities. He later served for decades as executive secretary of the NAACP.
