= George W. Murphy =

American military officer and lawyer (1841–1920)

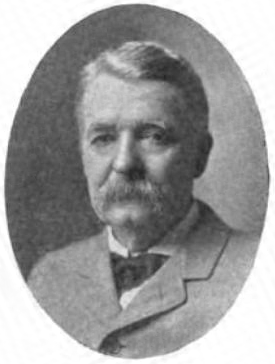
- In office 1901–1905

22nd Attorney General of Arkansas
- Governor: John Sebastian Little
- Preceded by: Jeff Davis
- Succeeded by: Robert L. Rogers

Personal details
- Born: January 8, 1841 Huntingdon, Tennessee
- Died: October 11, 1920 (aged 79) Little Rock, Arkansas

George Washington Murphy (January 8, 1841 – October 11, 1920) was a colonel in the Confederate Army during the American Civil War and served as the 22nd attorney general of Arkansas.

== Biography ==
Murphy was born and grew up in Huntingdon, Tennessee. He enlisted in the Confederate army in May 1861. Murphy was wounded in the battles of Shiloh, Murfreesboro, and Harrisburg, and his leg injury at Harrisburg disqualified him from service for the rest of the war. In 1865 he moved to Hamburg, Arkansas, and studied law under W. D. Moore. Murphy was admitted to the bar in 1866, and practiced law at Hamburg until 1877. Murphy became well known as a prominent lawyer in Hot Springs, especially for his acumen as a criminal attorney. He exaggerated his limp that he suffered during the war to gain sympathy for clients and from the jury, and carried a pocket watch that he would open and distract the jury from the prosecutor's speech. In 1897, Murphy and his family moved into the house at 1301 Scott Street in Little Rock.

A member of the Democratic Party, he served as Arkansas's attorney general from 1901–1905. He dissolved his firm, Murphy, Coleman & Lewis after stepping down as attorney general and formed Murphy & Lewis in 1907. His daughter was Elizabeth Murphy, who married prominent lawyer Henry Armistead in 1903. Murphy ran for Governor of Arkansas on the Progressive Party ticket in 1912, but lost to Joseph Taylor Robinson.

He later worked with NAACP civil rights lawyer Scipio Jones in the aftermath of the 1919 Elaine massacre. Murphy and Jones filed motions for new trials of some of the convicted men on December 18, stating they were denied due process. They afterwards appealed to the Arkansas Supreme Court, reversing the convictions of six men due to the wording of the jury verdict. He continued to practice law until his death in 1920 after a short illness. Murphy was buried in Hot Springs.
