= Robert Lee Hill =

American labor unionist

Robert Lee Hill (June 8, 1892 or 1898 – May 11, 1963) was an African-American sharecropper from the Arkansas Delta and a political activist, founder of the Progressive Farmers and Household Union of America (PFHUA) following World War I. Based in Arkansas, this organization was intended to help sharecroppers and tenant farmers to gain better financial arrangements with white landowners.

The PFHUA organized a meeting of black farmers near Elaine, Arkansas on September 30, 1919. When two deputized white men and a black trustee arrived at the church to disrupt the meeting, shots were exchanged. The white community reacted with extreme violence in an event which became known as the Elaine massacre. For two days, white militia swept through the county attacking blacks; a total of five whites and hundreds of blacks were killed, and the government called in federal troops to quell the riot. Hill fled to Kansas, where he was later arrested. The NAACP worked on his behalf with the state and with federal authorities. Governor Henry Justin Allen refused an extradition request from the state of Arkansas, stating he did not believe Hill would be safe in Arkansas jails or given a fair trial there. Federal charges were later dropped and Hill was released from jail in October 1920.

He later worked for at least two different railroad companies in the Midwest, from 1920 to 1962. Their expansion provided new industrial jobs for African Americans. He died within a year after his retirement in August 1962.

== Early life ==
Robert Lee Hill was born in Dermott, Chicot County, Arkansas. There is little documentation of his birth and early life, in fact his exact birth year is unknown, documents list 1892 or 1898. Documents in his handwriting seem to show that he had some form of limited formal education. Hill did complete a correspondence course as a private investigator and was known to refer to himself as "Robert Hill, U.S. Detective".

The white Democratic-dominated legislature passed an election law in 1891 and poll tax amendment to the state constitution in 1892 that effectively disenfranchised most blacks and many poor whites in the state. With little opposition left, the legislature passed and imposed Jim Crow laws for racial segregation.

Hill was listed as working as a brakeman for the Missouri Pacific Railroad in Little Rock, Arkansas, from January 1915 to December 1919. Sometime before 1918, Hill moved from his birthplace to the town of Winchester, Arkansas, in Drew County. By this time he was married, had two children, and worked for the Valley Planting Company.

== Progressive Farmers and Household Union of America ==
While living in Winchester, Hill became active in organizing African-American laborers, sharecroppers and tenant farmers. They worked for white landowners at a disadvantage, as they were dependent on the owners' dispersing funds and settling accounts after they sold the cotton crops. The landowners seldom provided itemized accounts, often required sharecroppers to buy seeds and supplies from plantation stores, and sold the cotton according to their own schedules. Sharecroppers often struggled financially for months after delivering cotton to the landowners and forced into a cycle of debt and poverty.

In 1918, Hill formed the Progressive Farmers and Household Union of America. He based his association on black fraternal organizations, the international trade union movement, and Booker T. Washington's National Negro Business League. Hill intended to use the organization to force landowners to pay tenant farmers their full shares and to establish union-owned farms. Members purchased shares worth a dollar, and the money would be held in a real estate fund to aid members in purchasing property. Membership cost a dollar and fifty cents; attendance and speaking privileges at congresses cost five dollars, a share in the union headquarters cost ten dollars to fund its construction, and getting one's name engraved cost fifty dollars.

During the summer of 1919, following the end of World War I, Hill encouraged hundreds of African-American sharecroppers and sawmill workers to join his organization. Hill was successful in attracting African-American veterans of the war, who resented the racial discrimination they faced at home after their service in the war. During that summer, Hill organized union chapters in the small towns of Hoop Spur, Ratio, Elaine, Old Town, Countiss, Ferguson, and Mellwood.

== Elaine massacre ==
In the fall of 1919, the PFHUA hired Ulysses S. Bratton, a lawyer from Little Rock, to sue for fair payment of their cotton crop in court. Black informants reported this information to local whites, who tried to keep track of local meetings. On September 30, Hill and other union members met with Bratton to discuss their case when a group of armed white men interrupted and kidnapped Bratton, who was jailed for thirty days, believing he was the leader of the PFHUA. At the same time, gunfire broke out at a September 30 meeting of the Hoop Spur chapter and a white man was killed; hundreds of whites poured into the area, attacking and murdering blacks, whether they were involved with the union or not, throughout the county during that night and the next days. This was known as the Elaine massacre: a total of five whites and hundreds of blacks were killed; the exact number is unknown. It was possibly the deadliest race riot in United States history; only blacks were indicted by county officials in these events.

Hill escaped the ensuing chaos and fled to Kansas. Authorities portrayed him as both a conman taking advantage of the sharecroppers, and the leader of a conspiracy to kill plantation owners and white people.

=== Arrest and extradition order ===
On 20 January 1920 Hill was arrested in Kansas after Arkansas police determined his location from intercepting a letter that Hill had written to his wife. After his capture, Arkansas officials charged him with murder and asked for his extradition. Federal authorities indicted Hill for inciting to riot and impersonating a federal officer.

After intense lobbying by the NAACP, Kansas Governor Henry Justin Allen refused to extradite Hill. He said that he did not believe Hill would receive a fair trial in Arkansas, nor would he be safe in Arkansas jails. Hill was released on October 11, 1920, after federal charges were dropped due to NAACP lobbying with authorities in Washington.

== Later years ==
Hill suffered an injury while working at a meatpacking plant in Topeka, Kansas in 1921. Unable to carry out heavy physical work, he tried to get a position with the NAACP. James Weldon Johnson, the NAACP executive secretary, recommended that Hill join the Topeka branch.

According to his 1935 railroad service verification records, Hill went to work as a carman helper in the Atchison, Topeka and Santa Fe Railway shops in Topeka beginning July 1, 1922 under the name George L. Smith. He changed his name back to Robert Lee Hill in February 1924. He worked as a laborer with the Chicago, Milwaukee, St. Paul and Pacific Railroad in Chicago from January 1920 to May 1922.

The service record states he was born in Dermott, Drew County (sic Chicot County), Arkansas, on June 8, 1892. He retired from his work with the AT&SF Railroad on August 16, 1962. He died May 11, 1963, in Topeka and is buried at the Topeka Cemetery.

== See also ==
- Moore v. Dempsey
