= Robert L. Hill =

Robert L. Hill may refer to:

- Robert Lee Hill (1892–1963), African-American sharecropper, trade unionist and civil rights activist
- Robert L. Hill (biochemist) (1928–2012), American biochemist
