= Womack House =

Historic house in Arkansas, United States

- Formerly listed on the U.S. National Register of Historic Places
- U.S. Historic district – Contributing property
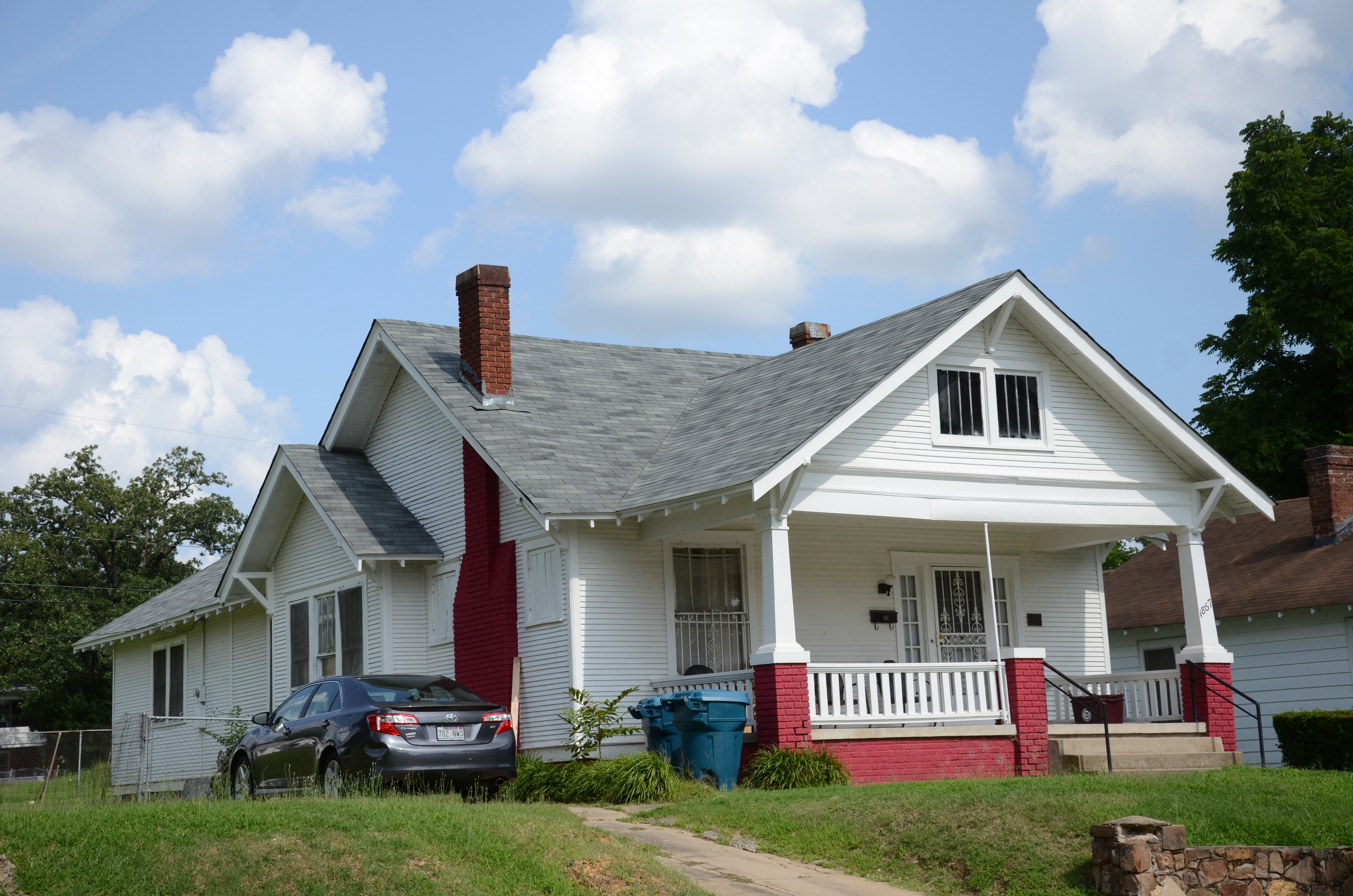

- Location within Arkansas Location within the United States
- Location: 1867 S. Ringo St., Little Rock, Arkansas
- Coordinates: 34°43′52″N 92°17′7″W
- Area: less than one acre
- Built: 1922
- Architectural style: Bungalow/craftsman
- Part of: Paul Laurence Dunbar School Neighborhood Historic District (ID13000789)
- MPS: Historically Black Properties in Little Rock's Dunbar School Neighborhood MPS
- NRHP reference No.: 99000546

Significant dates
- Added to NRHP: May 28, 1999
- Designated CP: September 27, 2013
- Removed from NRHP: January 17, 2023

The Womack House is a historic house at 1867 South Ringo Street in Little Rock, Arkansas. It is a single-story wood-frame structure, with a low-pitch gable roof, weatherboard siding, and a brick foundation. A cross-gabled porch extends across the front, supported by sloping square columns. The gable ends are supported by knee brackets, and the eaves have exposed rafter ends in the Craftsman style. The house was built in 1922 for Dr. A. A. Womack, a prominent African-American doctor of the period.

The house was listed on the National Register of Historic Places in 1999, and is a contributing property to the Paul Laurence Dunbar School Neighborhood Historic District, listed in 2013. It was delisted from the National Register in 2023.

== See also ==
- National Register of Historic Places listings in Little Rock, Arkansas
