= Paul Laurence Dunbar School Neighborhood Historic District =

Historic district in Arkansas, United States

- U.S. National Register of Historic Places
- U.S. Historic district
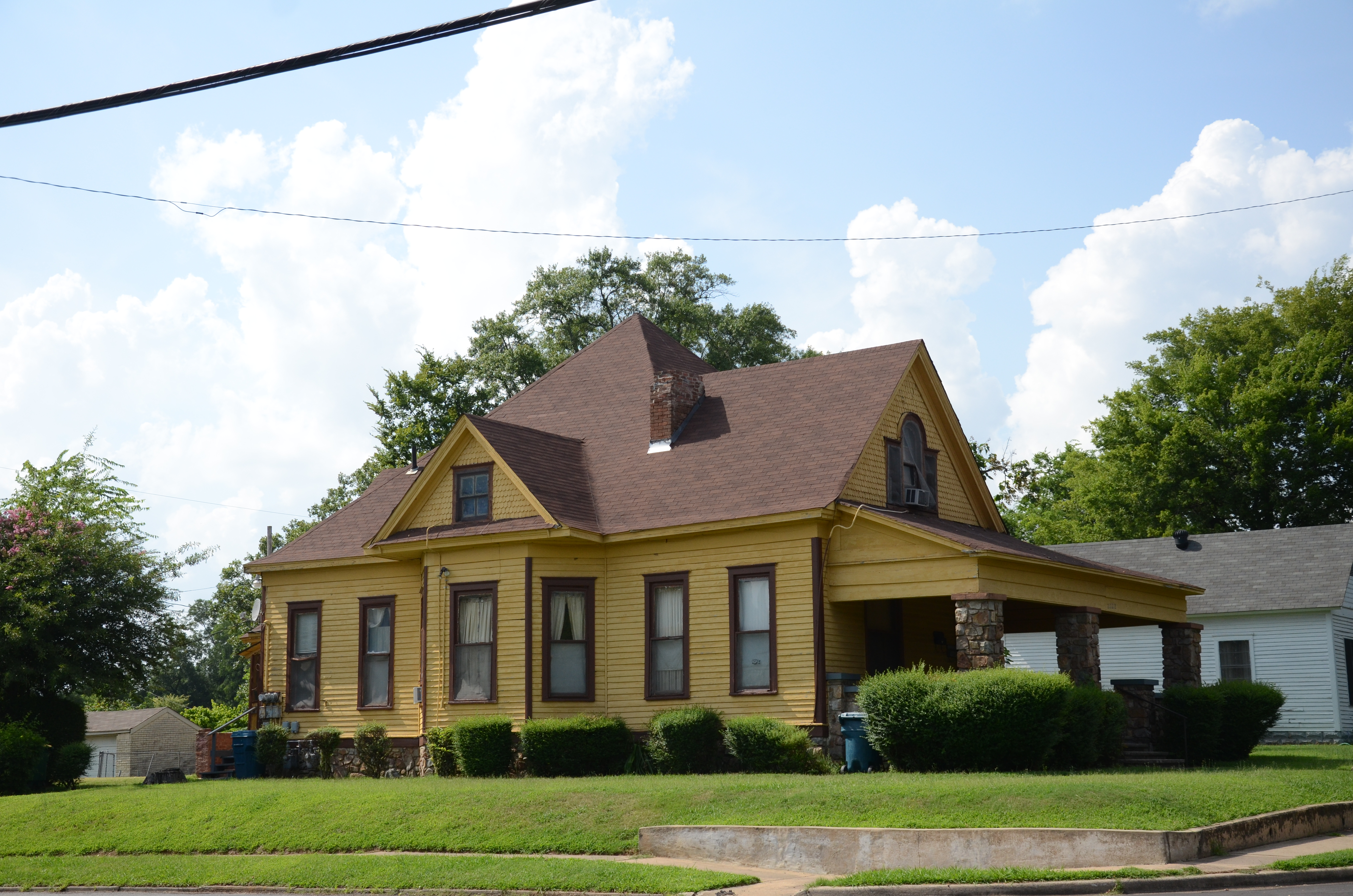

- Location within Arkansas Location within the United States
- Location: Roughly bounded by Wright Ave., S. Chester, S. Ringo & W. 24th Sts., Little Rock, Arkansas
- Coordinates: 34°43′44″N 92°17′7″W
- NRHP reference No.: 13000789
- Added to NRHP: September 27, 2013

The Paul Laurence Dunbar School Neighborhood Historic District encompasses a historical neighborhood area of central Little Rock, Arkansas. Primarily developed between 1890 and 1915, the area was initially racially integrated, but had by the mid-1960s become predominantly African-American. It is anchored at the northern end by the Dunbar School campus, and extends south for 6-1/2 blocks along South Cross and South Ringo Streets. Prominent houses in the district include the Miller House (1853 S. Ringo), the Womack House (1867 S. Ringo), and the Scipio A. Jones House (1872 S. Cross).

The district was listed on the National Register of Historic Places in 2013.

== See also ==
- National Register of Historic Places listings in Little Rock, Arkansas
