= Scipio Africanus Jones =

American lawyer and politician (1863–1943)

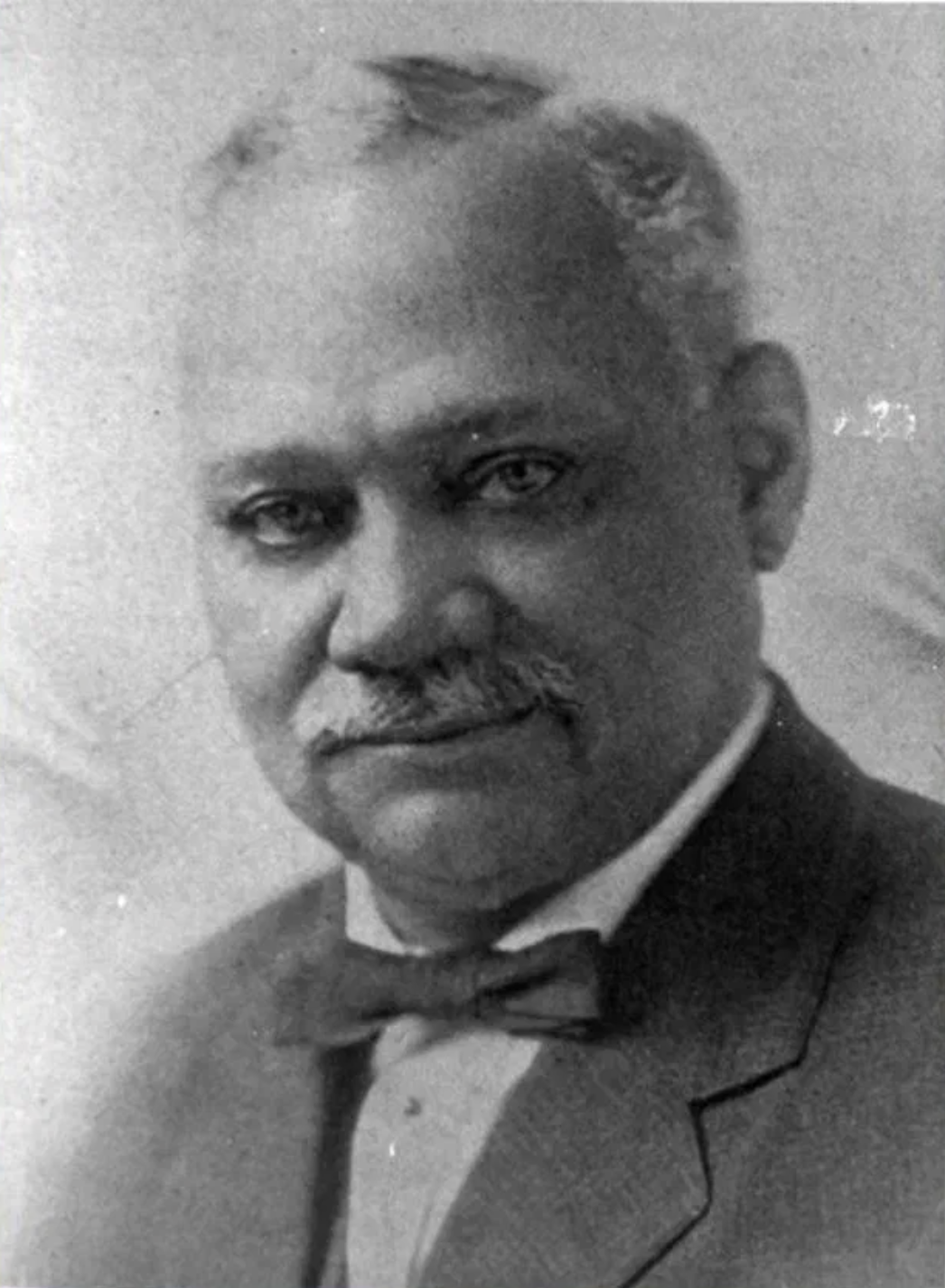
- Jones, c. 1907
- Born: August 3, 1863; Near Tulip, Arkansas, U.S.
- Died: March 2, 1943 (aged 79); Little Rock, Arkansas, U.S.
- Resting place: Haven of Rest Cemetery, Little Rock, Arkansas, U.S.
- Education: Philander Smith College; Shorter College (BA)
- Occupations: Lawyer, judge, businessman, philanthropist, teacher
- Political party: Republican

Scipio Africanus Jones (August 3, 1863 – March 2, 1943) was an American educator, lawyer, judge, philanthropist, and Republican politician from the state of Arkansas. He was most known for having guided the appeals of the twelve African-American men condemned to death after the Elaine massacre of October 1919. More than one hundred African Americans were indicted in the aftermath of the riot, although an estimated one hundred to two hundred Black Americans were killed in the county, along with five whites. No white people were prosecuted by the state. The case was appealed to the United States Supreme Court, which in Moore v. Dempsey (1923) set a precedent of reviewing the conduct of state criminal trials against the Due Process Clause of the Fourteenth Amendment to the United States Constitution.

Born into slavery in Smith Township near Tulip in Dallas County in south Arkansas, Jones became a successful and powerful businessman. Jones was the first lawyer in Arkansas to raise the question why African Americans were not permitted to serve on grand juries and petit juries. In 1915, Jones broke a color barrier when he was appointed to serve as acting judge of the Little Rock police court, presiding over a case in which all the parties were African American, as were the witnesses and attorneys except the city attorney, who supported having an African American judge preside at this particular trial. Jones also represented the Prince Hall Shriners as part of a successful defense against efforts to keep them from using the name and paraphernalia of the white Shriners organization.

== Early life and education ==
Scipio Africanus Jones was born on August 3, 1863, near Tulip, Arkansas. Jones' mother, Jemmina Jones, was black and enslaved by Dr. Adolphus and Carolyn Jones, who assigned her as the companion of their daughter Thresa. Jemmina was 15 years old when she gave birth to her mixed-race son Scipio. Thresa's parents died when she was 9 years old, and went to live with her uncle, Dr. Sanford Reamey taking Jemmina with her. Scipio's father is generally considered to be Dr. Sanford Reamey.

Jones attended black schools near his hometown. In 1883, he moved to Little Rock at the age of twenty and took preparatory courses at Walden Seminary (now Philander Smith College). In 1885, Jones earned a bachelor's degree from Bethel Institute (later known as Shorter College), a historically black college in North Little Rock. While he was enrolled in schools, he earned money by working in chopped cotton.

Jones worked as a school teacher in Big Rock District Two from 1885 until 1887. He was a tenant of James Lawson, a white man, a member of a pioneer family of Little Rock. At this time, Jones also befriended three prominent black business owners: Ed Wood, Sr., owner of the largest black-owned plantation in the state and the only African American on the local commodities trading floor; John Bush, a powerful black merchant and lumber yard owner; and Chester Keatts. These three initiated Jones into the Prince Hall Freemasonry, a secret fraternal society of prominent African Americans who pooled resources for the ideals of liberty, equality and peace.

Jones offered to work for free as a janitor at the law offices of U.S. District Judge Henry C. Caldwell, Judge T.B. Martin, and Atty. S.A. Kilgore. While there, he began to read law books during his free time. He also became an apprentice under Circuit Judge Robert J. Lea. Jones passed the Arkansas Bar in 1889. When he had begun his studies, Arkansas had no law school for African-American students, and reading law in an established firm was a common way for men to study the law and prepare for the bar.

== Political life ==
Jones joined the Republican Party and unsuccessfully ran for state representative in 1892. He was a delegate to the Republican National Convention several times. In 1891, the Democratic-controlled Arkansas General Assembly passed a new election law making voting more complicated and eliminating numerous illiterate voters; together with a poll tax amendment passed in 1892, these measures disenfranchised many African Americans in the state and many poor white people. The Republican Party offered Jones the positions of Recorder of Deeds in the District of Columbia and Ambassador to the Republic of Haiti, but he declined both appointments to concentrate on local affairs.

The Republican Party in the state suffered a substantial loss in voters due to the disfranchisement measures. Jones became involved in the struggle between the Lily Whites and the Black and Tans within the Republican Party. In 1902, Jones helped organize a slate of black Republicans to challenge the Lily Whites and Democrats in the city of Little Rock general election. The struggle reached a breaking point in 1920, when African American community nominated J.H. Blount, an African American candidate, for Governor for the first time. In that year, Jones was selected as the Black and Tan contender for the Arkansas Republican National Committee. Four years later, Jones, J. H. Blount, N. R. Parker and J. Hibbler helped organize a Black and Tan protest meeting in Little Rock in which a list of demands for equal political treatment was presented to the Lily Whites. Eventually, a compromise was reached that guaranteed black representation on the Republican State Central Committee.

== Business life ==
Jones was a successful and powerful businessman. He was the founder and owner of People's Ice & Fuel Company, which had the distinction of being both the only black-owned and black-operated ice manufacturing company and the only black-owned and black-operated fuel company in the U.S. He extended his relationship with Eddie Wood, Sr, and Jon Bush, when they supported his formation of the Arkansas Negro Business League, an affiliate of Booker T. Washington's National Negro Business League (NNBL). Additionally, he joined the Prince Hall Masons, with their sponsorship.

During the administration of Mayor Ben D. Brickhouse, the Little Rock Clearing House, composed of representatives from the ten banks of Little Rock, had declined to make a loan to the city. When Brickhouse mentioned this fact to Jones, Jones asked the mayor how much money the city needed. The mayor replied that he needed $75,000; Jones said, "My clients have $120,000 on deposit in the banks of Little Rock and if the Clearing House will not let you have the money, my clients will." After hearing about the conversation, the Clearing House agreed to lend the city the $75,000.

== Practice of law ==
Jones was accepted into the American Bar Association in 1889. Shortly thereafter, he was admitted to practice in the circuit court of Pulaski County, which includes Little Rock. In 1900, he was admitted to the state Supreme Court, followed by the United States District Court (1901), the United States Supreme Court (1905), and the United States Court of Appeals (1914). He served as the first treasurer of the National Negro Bar Association when it was formed in Little Rock in 1910 as an auxiliary of the NNBL.

Jones was the National Attorney General of the Mosaic Templars of America, an organization founded by John E. Bush and Chester W. Keatts, was, at the time, one of the largest African-American fraternal organizations in the nation, and one of the largest black-owned business enterprises. The organization provided burial and life insurance to members; operated a building and loan association, a newspaper, a nursing school, and a hospital; and offered other social programs to the community. Its international headquarters were located in Little Rock, Arkansas.

Jones also served as the attorney, counselor, and legal adviser for several other African-American fraternal organizations, including the International Order of Twelve and Knights and Daughters of Tabor, which also had its headquarters in Arkansas, a few blocks from the Mosaic Templars. He successfully defended the Grand Lodge of the Knights of Pythias when the Arkansas Insurance Commission attempted to put them out of business. Because of his work with African-American fraternal organizations, he was called "the Gibraltar of Negro fraternal beneficiary societies."

In 1915, when Fred A. Isgrig was judge of the Little Rock police court, Isgrig disqualified himself in a case. City Attorney, Harry C. Hale, nominated Jones to act as judge. As all the parties were African Americans, as were the witnesses and attorneys except Hale, Hale thought it proper to have a black judge preside at this particular trial. Jones was elected special judge. The election of an African American justice so angered W. N. Lee, a white lawyer from Little Rock who was originally from Mississippi, that he engaged in fisticuffs with Hale for nominating Jones. He said that he would not live in a state in which white people would elect an African American. The trial was held about ten o'clock in the morning and Lee left the state about four o'clock that afternoon and never returned.

On August 26, 1924, the Pulaski County Democratic convention met in session. The meeting, packed with anti-Klan delegates who listened attentively to many verbal lashings of the secret fraternity, was the first at which a direct attack was ever made by the Democratic party in the county against the Ku Klux Klan, which had been active in the state since 1921. Scathing denunciations of the order were made by the chairman of the convention, Fred A. Isgrig, and the secretary of the County Central Committee, Frank H. Dodge. These were both received with applause. Isgrig traced the history of the Little Rock Klan in politics, describing the fight it had made to obtain control of the school board, the county offices, and the membership of the state legislature allotted to the district. He pointed out further that the election judges and clerks were chosen with the assistance of Klansmen, including C. P. Newton, the Democratic candidate for county judge.

Before adjourning, the convention adopted a resolution, the conclusion of which stated:

Be it ... resolved that we call upon the citizens not only of this county but upon all the counties of the state of Arkansas, to join with us in casting the Ku Klux Klan out of the Democratic party and forcing it to come out in the open, under its own colors as a Ku Klux Klan party, instead of seeking to hide its identity within the folds of the Democratic party.

In 1924, Jones was elected special chancellor in the Pulaski County Chancery Court.

Jones was the first lawyer in Arkansas to raise the question that African Americans had not been permitted to serve on the grand and petit juries, although many were qualified. He contended that this was discrimination on account of race, color, and previous condition of servitude, and was prohibited by the US Constitution. Jones raised this question before it was raised in the Carter case of Texas, which was afterwards appealed to the Supreme Court of the United States. The Supreme Court held that it was a discrimination on account of race, color, and previous condition of servitude. Many cases were dismissed in Texas in which indictments had been made without Negro persons being on the jury.

Following the Adair case in Georgia, many suits of injunction were brought in other states against the Prince Hall Shriners to keep from using the name and paraphernalia of the white Shriners organization. Jones represented the Prince Hall Shriners in such a suit brought in Pulaski County. Chancellor Judge John Martineau held in his favor. Jones also assisted in the trial of the case at Houston, Texas, against the Prince Hall Shriners. The white Shrine Temple had sold its paraphernalia to the Prince Hall Shrine Temple, and then enjoined the Prince Hall Shriners from using the paraphernalia. This case was carried to the U.S. Supreme Court where it ruled that the Prince Hall Shriners had the right to use the paraphernalia on the ground of "estoppel."

== The Elaine Twelve ==
Jones is most famous for his skillful defense of the Elaine 12, twelve black sharecroppers sentenced to death for allegedly being involved in the murder of a white man during the Elaine massacre in October 1919. The twelve men had been convicted and sentenced to death by an all-white jury in a series of trials that were said to have lasted approximately 20 minutes.

The plight of the Elaine 12, and 87 other black men who were convicted to prison terms for participation in the riot, quickly made international headlines. Three organizations offered assistance: the Arkansas Conference on Negro Organizations (ACNO), the National Association for the Advancement of Colored People (NAACP), and the National Equal Rights League (NERL). The ACNO and NERL joined to hire Jones as the defense attorney for all 99 of the convicted men. The NAACP hired former state attorney general George W. Murphy as the defense attorney for the Elaine 12. The two attorneys were friends and decided to work together.

When George Murphy died unexpectedly after they had started the retrial of six of the murder defendants in May 1920, after winning an appeal in the Arkansas Supreme Court, Jones took the lead in guiding the appeals process. After much internal debate, the NAACP temporarily retained Jones as their replacement for Murphy, making him briefly the sole attorney for all of the 99 defendants. He successfully continued with the Moore et al. defendants, whose cases were reviewed by the U.S. Supreme Court. Jones is credited with having been the author of the brief used before the Court.

When it was time to argue the Elaine 12 case before the Supreme Court, the NAACP decided to replace Jones with Moorfield Storey of Boston, founding president of the NAACP since 1909, and former assistant U.S. attorney Ulysses S. Bratton of Little Rock. Jones continued to support the cases, and in 1923 the Supreme Court ruled in Moore v. Dempsey that, for the first time, collateral attack through habeas corpus was permissible on a state appellate court decision. It was a landmark precedent that marked the Court's review of state criminal cases from the point of view of the Due Process Clause of the Fourteenth Amendment. During the trials, Jones received frequent lynching threats while in Arkansas. He was said to have shifted his location each night because of the risk to his safety.

New trials were granted to the twelve defendants as the court stated that they had not received due process in the original trials.

Charges were quickly dismissed against six of the defendants. The remaining six were retried, convicted and sentenced to twelve years in prison. Jones successfully lobbied Arkansas Governor Thomas McRae, who had earlier refused to release the defendants, to let men out on indefinite furloughs in 1925. Before leaving office, Governor McRae also pardoned the other 87 Elaine defendants.

This was hours before Governor-elect Tom Jefferson Terral, a Klan member, assumed office. During a speech before one of the largest KKK rallies in Arkansas history the night before his inauguration, Terral vowed to execute the six remaining Elaine defendants as his first official duty in office.

== Later in life ==
Jones remained active in Republican politics and continued to press legal challenges to racial discrimination in Arkansas until his death. During World War I, Jones led the Liberty Bond recruitment drive among the African-American community in Arkansas and raised $243,000 in the effort. Jones also served as the head of the Negro State Suffrage League and fought for voting rights for black citizens throughout his life. Jones served as director of the United Charities drive, a predecessor of the United Way of America.

Jones's last case was in 1942, when he teamed up with Thurgood Marshall of NAACP's Legal Defense Fund to sue the Little Rock School District to obtain equal pay for a black school teacher. Though Jones died before the completion of the case, Marshall gained victory in court.

Scipio Jones died on March 2, 1943, in Little Rock, and is interred there at Haven of Rest Cemetery.

== Honors and legacy ==
- The premiere segregated high school for black teenagers in central Arkansas, Scipio Jones High School in North Little Rock, was named for him during his lifetime. It was built on land originally owned by Eddie Wood Sr., his former business colleague.
- S.A. Jones Drive in North Little Rock, Arkansas is named in his honor.
- Jones's house in Little Rock is listed on the National Register of Historic Places.

== See also ==
- List of African-American Republicans
