= Lynching of William Turner =

1921 Arkansas lynching

- Part of Jim Crow Era
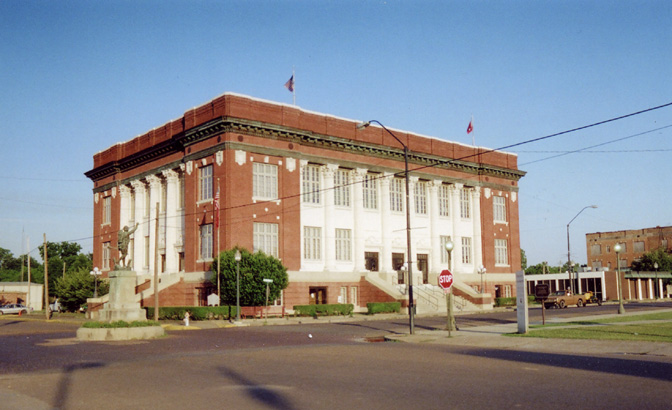
- The Phillips County Courthouse. Turner's body was set on fire at a nearby park.
- Date: November 18, 1921
- Location: Helena, Arkansas, U.S.
- Participants: A mob of 25 men from Helena
- Deaths: 1

An 18-year-old African American named William Turner was lynched on November 18, 1921, in Helena, Arkansas, for an alleged assault on a 15-year-old white girl. Two years earlier hundreds of African-Americans were killed during the Elaine massacre in Hoop Spur, a nearby community also in Phillips County, Arkansas.

== Incident ==
Early November 18, 1921, a 15-year-old girl was walking to her work at the local telephone exchange when she was allegedly assaulted by William Turner. Before being arrested, the brother of the 15-year-old had shot Turner in the leg.

== Lynching ==
Aware of the possibility of a lynching, Sheriff Mays tried to drive Turner to Marianna, Arkansas. However, a group of masked white men stopped the sheriff, dragged Turner out of the car and shot him dead. At the same time, a separate mob stormed the jail in rear of the Phillips County Courthouse.

As the ambulance arrived on word of the shooting a larger mob of people pulled his body from the ambulance and shot his corpse several times. Then to chants from the mob of "Burn the body! Burn the body!" his body was doused with gasoline and set on fire. The Black paper the St. Louis Argus reported that "after the celebrants had had their fill," they called the victim's father, August Turner, to come to the little city park to and remove his son's bullet-ridden, charred remains.

== Red Summer ==
Two years earlier there were several incidents of civil unrest in the so-called American Red Summer of 1919. Terrorist attacks on black communities and white oppression in over three dozen cities and counties. In most cases, white mobs attacked African American neighborhoods. In some cases, black community groups resisted the attacks, especially in Chicago and Washington DC. Most deaths occurred in rural areas during events like the Elaine massacre in Hoop Spur, Phillips County, Arkansas (just 23 miles (37 km) from Helena, Phillips County, Arkansas) where an estimated 100 to 240 black people and 5 white people were killed. Also in 1919 were the Chicago Race Riot and Washington D.C. race riot which killed 38 and 39 people respectively. Both had many more non-fatal injuries and extensive property damage reaching into the millions of dollars.

== National memorial ==
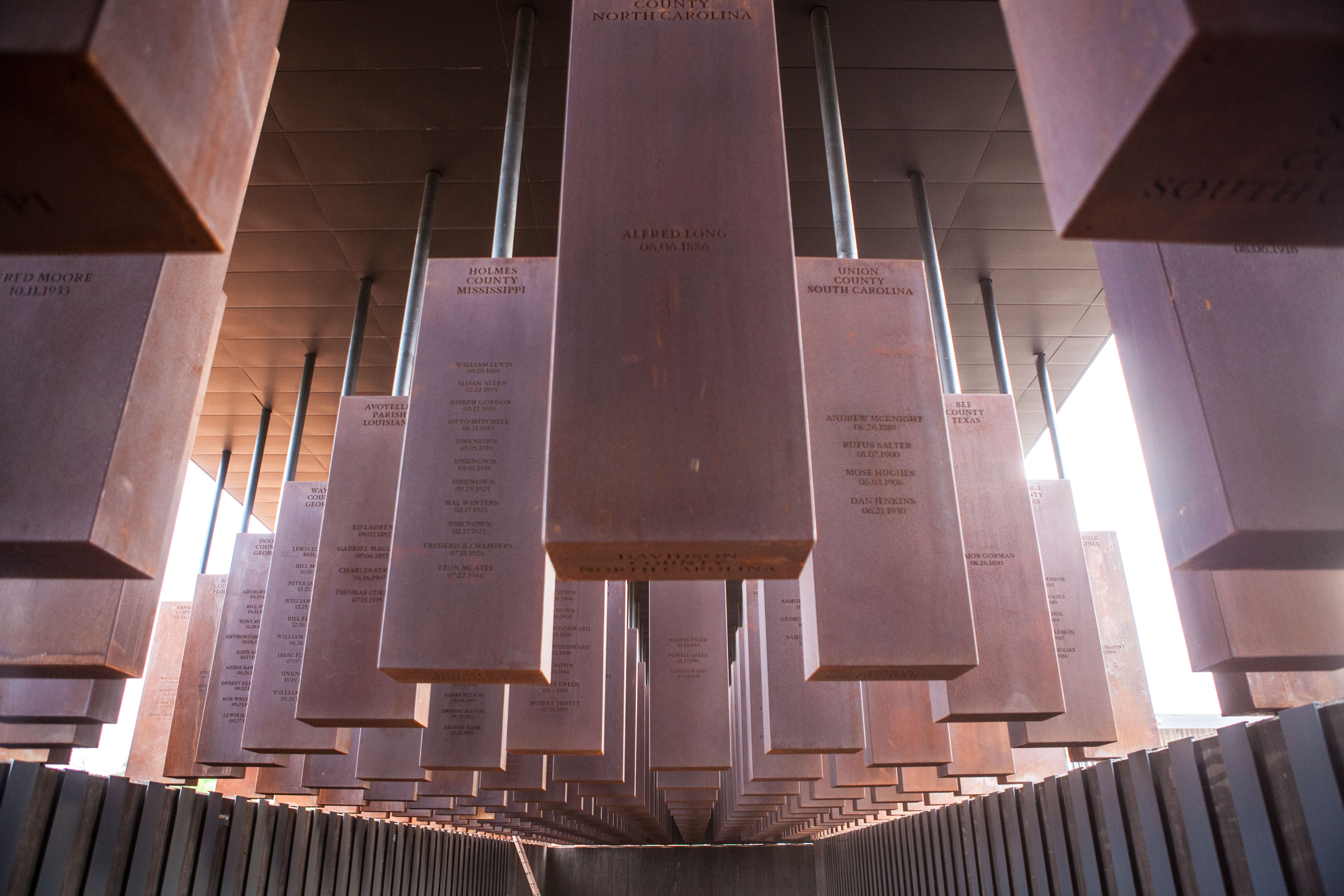
Memorial Corridor, National Memorial for Peace and Justice

The National Memorial for Peace and Justice opened in Montgomery, Alabama, on April 26, 2018, in a setting of 6 acres (2.4 ha). Featured among other things, is a sculpture by Kwame Akoto-Bamfo of a mother with a chain around her neck and an infant in her arms. On a hill overlooking the sculpture is the Memorial Corridor which displays 805 hanging steel rectangles, each representing the counties in the United States where a documented lynching took place and, for each county, the names of those lynched. According to the Equal Justice Initiative from 1880 to 1940 Phillips County had the highest rates of Lynching per year at 11.82 (Per 100,000 Residents) and had the most Lynching Victims at 245.

== Bibliography ==
Notes

References

- "Lynched By First Second Burns Body". The Chicago Whip. Chicago, Cook County, Illinois: Whip Pub. Co. November 26, 1921. pp. 1–8. ISSN 2694-099X. OCLC 15192974.
- Equal Justice Initiative (2021). "Lynching in America: Confronting the legacy of racial terror". Equal Justice Initiative.
- "Look Into Murder Of Arkansas Negro". Hickory Daily Record. Hickory, Catawba, North Carolina: Clay Print. Co. November 19, 1921. pp. 1–4. ISSN 1061-5628. OCLC 13340814.
- "Negro is shot to death by a mob at Helena". Paragould Soliphone. Paragould, Greene, Arkansas: Griffin Smith. November 21, 1921. pp. 1–4. ISSN 2693-0919. OCLC 21920718.
- "Negro is shot to death by a mob at Helena". St. Louis Argus. Joseph Everett Mitchell and William Mitchell. 1921. OCLC 3860143.
- The New York Times (October 5, 1919). "For Action on Race Riot Peril". The New York Times. New York, NY. ISSN 1553-8095. OCLC 1645522.
- Uenuma, Francine (August 2, 2018). "The Massacre of Black Sharecroppers That Led the Supreme Court to Curb the Racial Disparities of the Justice System". Smithsonian Institution.
