= Miller House (Little Rock, Arkansas) =

Historic house in Arkansas, United States

- U.S. National Register of Historic Places
- U.S. Historic district – Contributing property
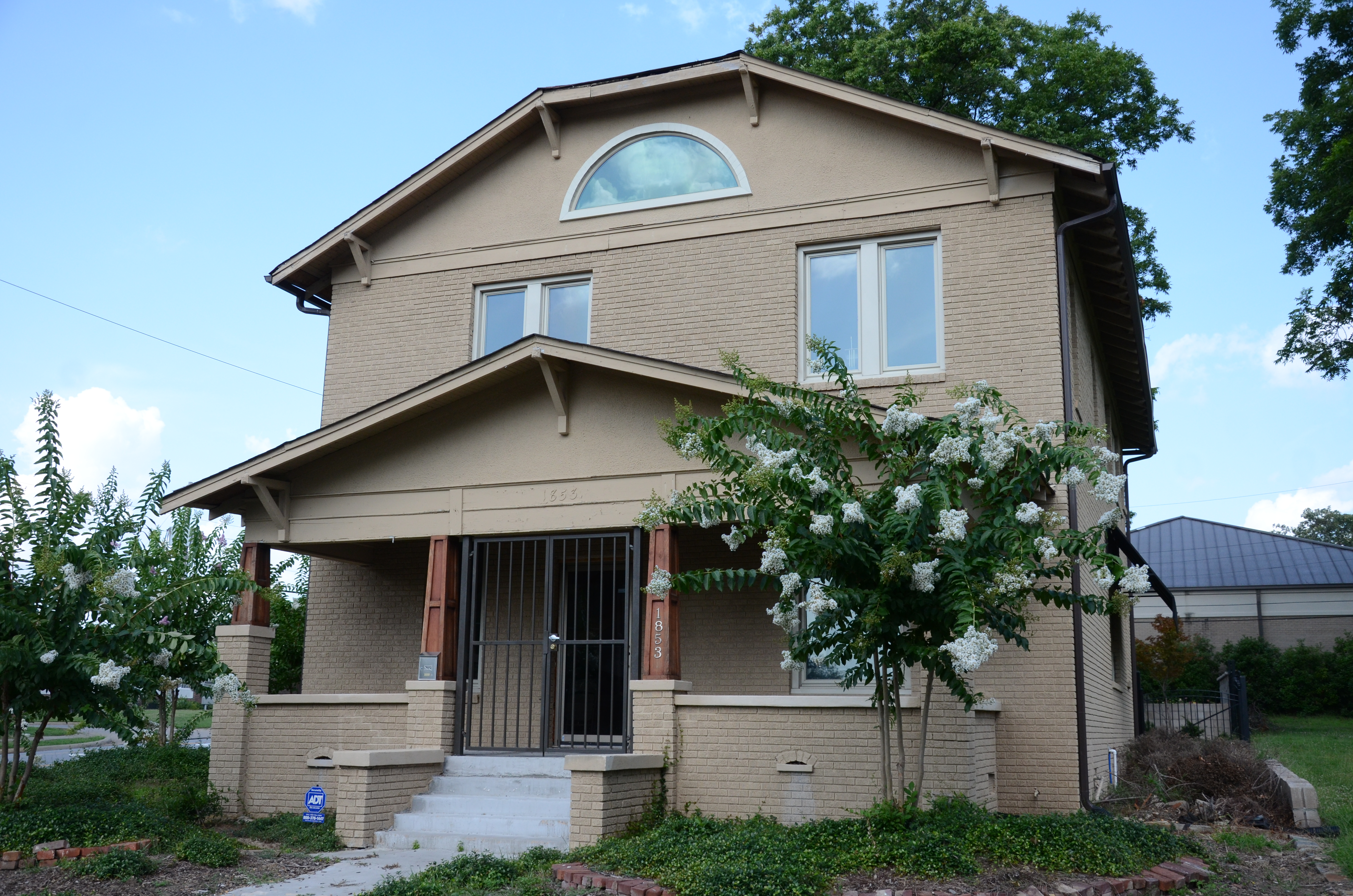

- Location within Arkansas Location within the United States
- Location: 1853 S. Ringo St., Little Rock, Arkansas
- Coordinates: 34°43′54″N 92°17′7″W
- Area: less than one acre
- Built: 1924
- Architectural style: Bungalow/craftsman
- Part of: Paul Laurence Dunbar School Neighborhood Historic District (ID13000789)
- MPS: Historically Black Properties in Little Rock's Dunbar School Neighborhood MPS
- NRHP reference No.: 99000547

Significant dates
- Added to NRHP: May 28, 1999
- Designated CP: September 27, 2013

The Miller House is a historic house at 1853 South Ringo Street in Little Rock, Arkansas. Built in 1906 and twice enlarged by the same owner, the house is a reflection of the effect of segregation in the United States. Now a two-story brick-faced Craftsman-styled structured, it was originally built as a modest single-story cottage typical of the segregated African-American neighborhood in which it was located. It was purchased in 1924 by Arthur T. Miller, who was employed in a comparatively secure position as a railroad mail clerk. Prevented by segregation from moving to more affluent neighborhoods, Miller chose to enlarge the house, and then finish it in brick.

The house was listed on the National Register of Historic Places in 1999.

== See also ==
- National Register of Historic Places listings in Little Rock, Arkansas
