= Fox Film Corp. v. Knowles =

- Supreme Court of the United States

Argued February 27, 1923 Decided March 12, 1923
- Full case name: Fox Film Corp. v. Knowles
- Citations: 261 U.S. 326 (more) 43 S. Ct. 365; 67 L. Ed. 680

Case history
- Prior: 279 F. 1018 (2d Cir. 1922)

Holding
- The statute intends that an executor, there being no widow, widower, or child, shall have the same right to renew a copyright for a second term as his testator might have exercised were he still alive.

Court membership
- Chief Justice William H. Taft Associate Justices Joseph McKenna · Oliver W. Holmes Jr. Willis Van Devanter · James C. McReynolds; Louis Brandeis · George Sutherland; Pierce Butler · Edward T. Sanford

Case opinion
- Majority: Holmes, joined by a unanimous court

Laws applied
- Copyright Act of 1909

Fox Film Corp. v. Knowles, 261 U.S. 326 (1923), was a United States Supreme Court case in which the Court held the statute intends that an executor, there being no widow, widower, or child, shall have the same right to renew a copyright for a second term as his testator might have exercised had he continued to survive.

This case was reaffirmed in Miller Music Corp. v. Charles N. Daniels, Inc..
