= Ulysses Simpson Bratton =

American politician

Ulysses Simpson Bratton (July 28, 1868 – December 11, 1947) was an American lawyer and politician whose work included representation of farmworker labor unions and advocacy for African Americans in peonage. He served two terms on the Arkansas House of Representatives.

== Early life ==
Bratton was born in Searcy, Arkansas to parents Benjamin Bratton and Mary Redman Bratton on July 28, 1868. After attending the Rally Hill Academy in Boone County, Bratton became a lawyer in 1892, and pursued further legal education at a predecessor institution of the University of Arkansas School of Law, graduating in 1897.

== Career ==
A Republican, Bratton was elected a Searcy County judge in 1893. He then served in the Arkansas House of Representatives for two terms, in 1895 and 1897. Bratton was appointed an assistant U. S. attorney by William McKinley in 1897, and held that office until 1907. As a U.S. attorney he prosecuted people violating peonage laws. Bratton turned his attention to the mining industry from 1898 to 1899, working with his family at the Marshall Mining Company. Bratton contested the 1900 United States House of Representatives elections for Arkansas's 5th congressional district, losing to incumbent Hugh A. Dinsmore. Bratton was a delegate to the 1908 Republican National Convention which nominated William Howard Taft as the Republican presidential candidate. Two years later, Taft appointed Bratton postmaster of Little Rock, a position Bratton resigned in 1913, to avoid continuous political attacks.

Bratton subsequently returned to private legal practice at Bratton, Frazier and Bratton, and was working with farmworkers to secure a fairer share of profits before the Elaine massacre. Bratton and Walter Francis White split legal duties when Moore v. Dempsey was argued in front of the Supreme Court of the United States. Bratton's legal advocacy for African Americans made him unpopular in his home state, and in the 1920s, his family moved to Detroit, Michigan, where Bratton continued practicing labor law at Bratton and Bratton. Bratton and his son Guy cofounded Detroit's City Bank. Bratton died in Detroit on December 11, 1947.
