= Moorfield Storey =

American lawyer and civil rights leader (1845–1929)

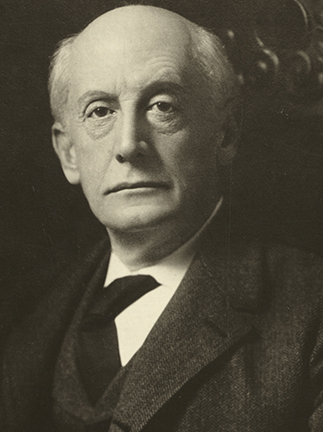

President of the National Association for the Advancement of Colored People
- In office 1909–1929
- Preceded by: Position established
- Succeeded by: Joel Elias Spingarn

President of the American Bar Association
- In office 1895–1896
- Preceded by: James C. Carter
- Succeeded by: James M. Woolworth

Personal details
- Born: March 19, 1845 Roxbury, Massachusetts, U.S. (now Boston)
- Died: October 24, 1929 (aged 84) Lincoln, Massachusetts, U.S.
- Education: Harvard University (BA)

Moorfield Storey (March 19, 1845 – October 24, 1929) was an American lawyer, anti-imperial activist, and civil rights leader based in Boston, Massachusetts. According to Storey's biographer, William B. Hixson Jr., he had a worldview that embodied "pacifism, anti-imperialism, and racial egalitarianism fully as much as it did laissez-faire and moral tone in government." Storey served as the founding president of the National Association for the Advancement of Colored People (NAACP), serving from 1909 to his death in 1929. He opposed United States expansionism beginning with the Spanish–American War.

== Early life ==
Moorfield Storey was born in 1845 in Roxbury, Massachusetts, then a suburb of Boston. His family was descended from the earliest Puritan settlers in New England and had close connections with the abolitionist movement. Storey's father was a Boston lawyer. The young Storey went to the Boston Latin School and graduated in 1862, during the beginning of the Civil War. He then continued onto Harvard University, where he was a member of the Glee Club, graduating in 1866, and then studied at Harvard Law School. In a speech almost thirty years later at Cambridge University, Storey discussed the mindset of the young men of his generation, stating that "a great movement for intellectual, religious, and political freedom was just culminating".

== Career ==
Storey established a law practice in Boston, Massachusetts as a founding partner of the firm Storey, Thorndike, Palmer, Dodge (Currently "Locke Lord LLP"). From 1873 to 1879 he was editor of the American Law Review. He was elected president of the American Bar Association in 1896, and was a fellow of the American Academy of Arts and Sciences. He served as president of the Massachusetts Bar Association during 1913–14.

He was a well-known person in the "Mugwump" movement of 1884, and actively supported Grover Cleveland. As a strong believer in the gold standard, freedom of contract, and property rights, Storey opposed the candidacy of William Jennings Bryan and supported the National Democratic Party (Gold Democrats) third-party ticket in 1896. In 1887 he built a house on Great Cranberry Island.

An opponent of military intervention, Storey spoke at the first anti-imperialist mass meeting in Boston in June 1898, called because of the Spanish–American War. He was a vice president of the New England Anti-Imperialist League. In addition, he wrote a book brief for the Lodge Committee summarizing the war crimes of the Philippine–American War. From 1905 until its dissolution in 1921 Storey was the Anti-Imperialist League's president. He perceived that "national subjugation overseas and racial persecution at home were related," which drove his efforts at reform.

Storey was known to work 16-hour days, even into his later years. He was a fighter for unpopular issues, and as Bliss Perry wrote in his obituary for Storey, he was "usually in the minority at any given time." Storey himself was quoted as saying "It is not success to fight on the winning side. It is success to fight bravely for a principle even if one does not live to see it triumph." This determination to fight for the right, even if he did not win, led him to cross political swords with Presidents William Howard Taft, Theodore Roosevelt, Woodrow Wilson, and United States Secretary of War Elihu Root.

== 1900 Congressional campaign ==
Late in the campaign of 1900, Storey seriously pondered running for president on a third-party ticket but decided against it as impractical. Instead, he ran a losing, but spirited and high-profile campaign for Congress as an independent anti-imperialist candidate. Other planks in his platform included support for the gold standard and free trade.

== Champion of civil rights ==
..."What, indeed, is true civilization ? By its fruit you shall know it. It is not dominion, wealth, material luxury – nay, not even a great literature and education widespread, good though these things be. Civilization is not a veneer; it must penetrate to the very heart and core of societies of men. Its true signs are thought for the poor and suffering, chivalrous regard and respect for women, the frank recognition of human brotherhood, irrespective of race or color or nation or religion; the narrowing of the domain of mere force as a governing factor in the world, the love of ordered freedom, abhorrence of what is mean and cruel and vile, ceaseless devotion to the claims of justice. Civilization in that, its true, its highest sense, must make for Peace."

— One of Storey's favourite quotes attributed to Lord Russell may have inspired his views on civil rights,

Storey consistently and aggressively championed civil rights, not only for blacks but also for American Indians and immigrants. He opposed immigration restrictions, and supported racial equality and self-determination.

"When the white man governs himself, that is self-government," he declared, "but when he governs himself and also governs another man, that is more than self-government–that is despotism."

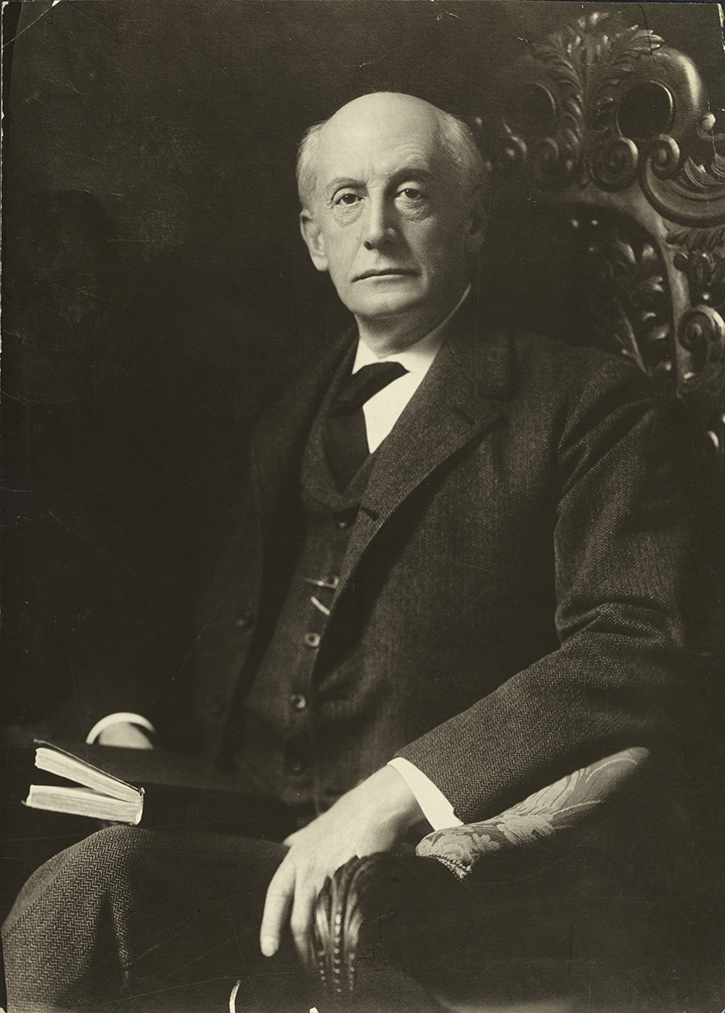
Moorfield Storey

Storey was the first president of the National Association for the Advancement of Colored People (NAACP), from its founding in 1909 until his death in 1929. According to his biographer Hixson, he "launched and maintained the effective campaign to achieve the total destruction of the legal embodiment of white supremacy." He guided NAACP's legal challenges to discriminatory laws that violated the Fourteenth and Fifteenth amendments, especially related to disenfranchisement and segregation of blacks in the South, and led several important NAACP legal victories. Most notably, he was lead counsel before the United States Supreme Court in Buchanan v. Warley (1917). In that case, the Court unanimously overturned a Louisville law that racially segregated blacks by specific city blocks. The Court's opinion reflected the jurisprudence of property rights and freedom of contract as embodied in the earlier precedent it had established in Lochner v. New York.

On February 17, 1916, he testified in opposition to the nomination of Louis D. Brandeis to the United States Supreme Court. Storey was on the conservative side in the Sacco and Vanzetti case.

Storey was, with James Weldon Johnson, the organizer of the 1919 National Conference on Lynching.

In 1920 Storey led the NAACP to take on the defense of the Elaine Twelve in their appeals from convictions for murder and the death penalty. The NAACP raised $50,000 for their defense, hiring two attorneys to manage the appeals in Arkansas. The cases were broken into two tracks because of technical trial issues, and six men (Ware et al.) were retried beginning in May 1920 after their defense team won the first appeal at the state supreme court. Storey worked with the team as the cases of six other men (Moore et al.) later reached the United States Supreme Court. In its ruling in Moore v. Dempsey (1923), the Court set an important precedent for reviewing state criminal cases against the standard of the Due Process Clause of the Fourteenth Amendment to the United States Constitution and application of Bill of Rights to state actions.

== Later life ==
In the 1920s, Storey opposed the U.S. occupations of Haiti and of the Dominican Republic as the chairperson of the Haiti-Santo Domingo Independence Society. He was also on the advisory committee of the American Fund for Public Service Committee on American Imperialism.

He died in Lincoln, Massachusetts in 1929, survived by four of his five children with Gertrude Cutts, whom he had married in 1870. She had died in 1912. His children were Charles Moorfield Storey, Elizabeth Storey Lovett, Richard Storey, Gertude Storey Burke and Katharine Storey Donald.

== Friendship with Edward Waldo Emerson and the Emerson family ==
Edward Waldo Emerson

Storey was longtime friends with Edward Waldo Emerson, son of famous American poet Ralph Waldo Emerson. The two were in the same graduating class at Harvard. Just after their graduation, Storey was one of two friends that accompanied Emerson on a camping trip. Also among the party was the elder Emerson, as well as Transcendentalist poet William Ellery Channing. The camping party encountered a fierce storm on their second night out, and Storey worked to lighten the mood by singing through storm, with the younger Emerson joining in to sing the chorus. The event is recorded in Ralph Waldo Emerson's journals of the time. The two men's friendship continued for the next several decades, and they wrote a biography of former United States Attorney General Ebenezer R. Hoar together in 1911.

== Time with Charles Sumner ==
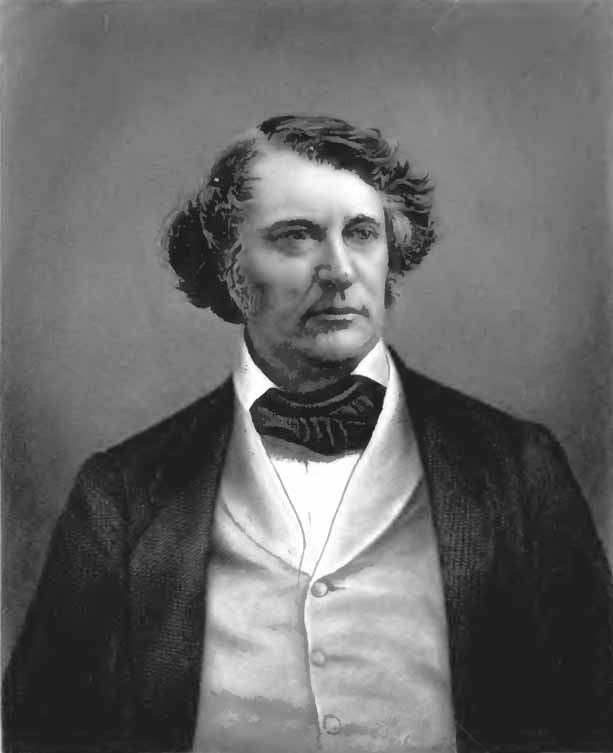
Charles Sumner

From 1867 to 1869, Storey was a clerk for the United States Senate Committee on Foreign Relations, and served as a private secretary to its chairman, Senator Charles Sumner. Storey was introduced to Sumner through his father, and moved to the Senator's house after his graduation from Harvard University. He accepted the position as it seemed the best route to continue his legal studies. Storey spent two years of his life as the Senator's right-hand man and one of his only friends, as the progressive Sumner had made many enemies in Washington. During his tenure, he initially supported the removal of President Andrew Johnson from office but soon became disenchanted by what he viewed as the corruption and opportunism of politicians on both sides. He was admitted to the bar in 1869.

== Legacy ==
Writer and editor Damon W. Root touted Storey as an historical role model for libertarian Democrats in a December 2007 article for Reason Magazine.

== Bibliography ==
- Charles Sumner (1900) in "American Statesmen Series."
- The Reform of Legal Procedure (1911).
- Ebenezer Rockwood Hoar, a Memoir (1911), with Edward Waldo Emerson. At Google Books.
- Problems of To-Day (1920), the E. L. Godkin Lectures delivered at Harvard, March 1920.
- The Conquest of the Philippines (1926)
- Howe, M.A. DeWolfe. Portrait of an Independent: Moorfield Storey 1845–1929. Boston: Houghton Mifflin, 1932.
