= Scipio A. Jones House =

Historic house in Arkansas, United States

- U.S. National Register of Historic Places
- U.S. Historic district – Contributing property
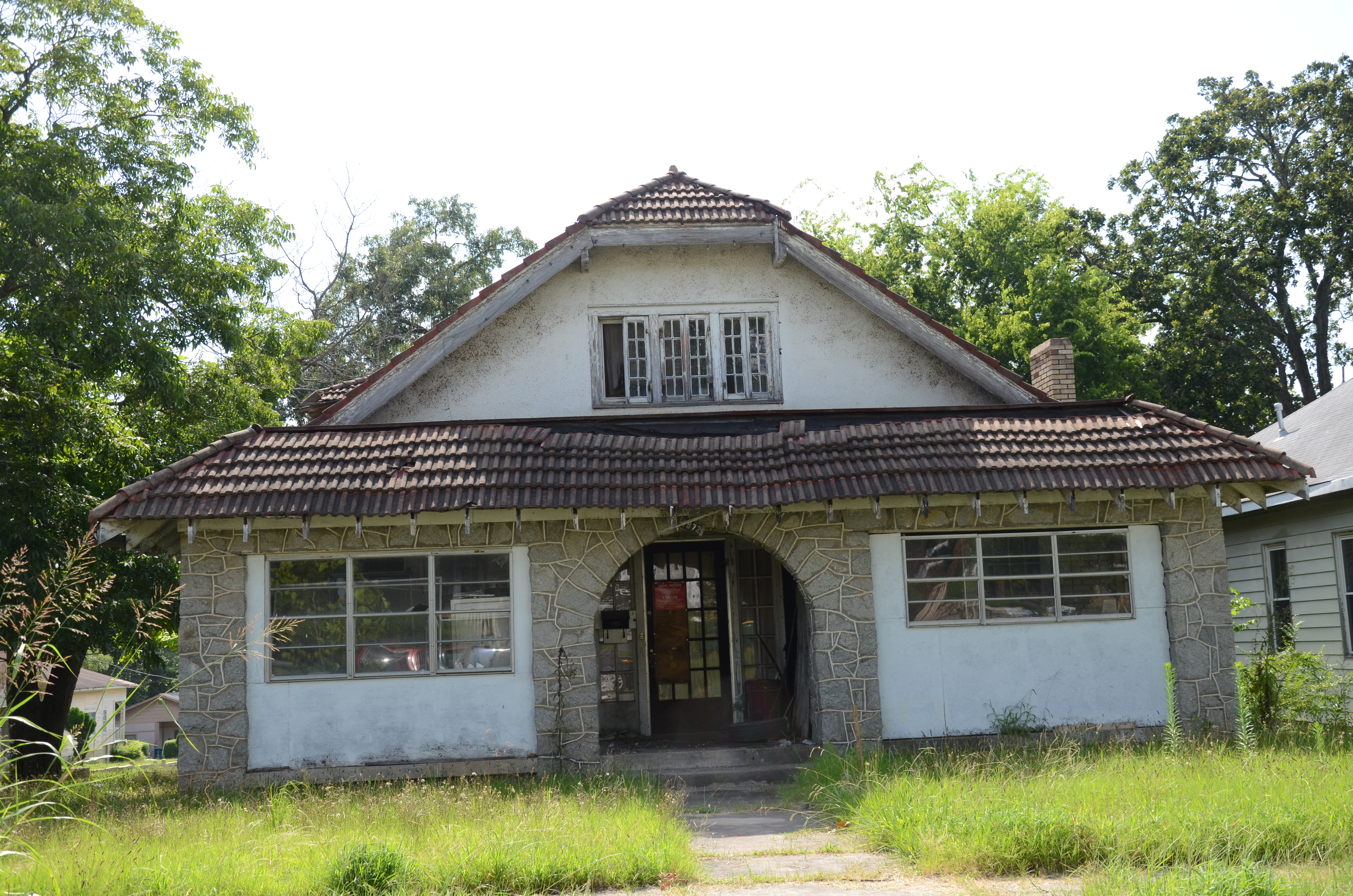

- Location within Arkansas Location within the United States
- Location: 1872 S. Cross St., Little Rock, Arkansas
- Coordinates: 34°43′52″N 92°17′13″W
- Area: less than one acre
- Built: 1928
- Architectural style: Bungalow/craftsman
- Part of: Paul Laurence Dunbar School Neighborhood Historic District (ID13000789)
- MPS: Historically Black Properties in Little Rock's Dunbar School Neighborhood MPS
- NRHP reference No.: 99000545

Significant dates
- Added to NRHP: May 28, 1999
- Designated CP: September 27, 2013

The Scipio A. Jones House is a historic house at 1872 South Cross Street in Little Rock, Arkansas. The house was built about 1928 for Scipio Jones, one of Arkansas's most prominent African-American lawyers and politicians of the period. It is a 1 1/2-story masonry structure, finished in an elaborate interpretation of the Craftsman style with a variety of materials. It has a clipped-gable roof covered with red tile, with a skirt of roofing extending across the front above the first floor. The entrance is recessed under a stone-faced arch, which is flanked by stuccoed bays with bands of three sash windows. The gable above also has a three-sash window group.

The house was listed on the National Register of Historic Places in 1999.

== See also ==
- National Register of Historic Places listings in Little Rock, Arkansas
