= List of United States Supreme Court cases, volume 261 =

Supreme Court of the United States
- Interactive map of Supreme Court of the United States
- 38°53′26″N 77°00′16″W
- Established: March 4, 1789; 237 years ago
- Location: Washington, D.C.
- Coordinates: 38°53′26″N 77°00′16″W
- Composition method: Presidential nomination with Senate confirmation
- Authorised by: Constitution of the United States, Art. III, § 1
- Judge term length: life tenure, subject to impeachment and removal
- Number of positions: 9 (by statute)
- Website: supremecourt.gov

This is a list of cases reported in volume 261 of United States Reports, decided by the Supreme Court of the United States in 1923.

== Justices of the Supreme Court at the time of volume 261 U.S. ==
The Supreme Court is established by Article III, Section 1 of the Constitution of the United States, which says: "The judicial Power of the United States, shall be vested in one supreme Court . . .". The size of the Court is not specified; the Constitution leaves it to Congress to set the number of justices. Under the Judiciary Act of 1789 Congress originally fixed the number of justices at six (one chief justice and five associate justices). Since 1789 Congress has varied the size of the Court from six to seven, nine, ten, and back to nine justices (always including one chief justice).

When the cases in volume 261 were decided the Court comprised the following nine members:

Portrait	Justice	Office	Home State	Succeeded	Date confirmed by the Senate (Vote)	Tenure on Supreme Court
	William Howard Taft	Chief Justice	Connecticut	Edward Douglass White	June 30, 1921 (Acclamation)	July 11, 1921 – February 3, 1930 (Retired)
	Joseph McKenna	Associate Justice	California	Stephen Johnson Field	January 21, 1898 (Acclamation)	January 26, 1898 – January 5, 1925 (Retired)
	Oliver Wendell Holmes Jr.	Associate Justice	Massachusetts	Horace Gray	December 4, 1902 (Acclamation)	December 8, 1902 – January 12, 1932 (Retired)
	Willis Van Devanter	Associate Justice	Wyoming	Edward Douglass White (as Associate Justice)	December 15, 1910 (Acclamation)	January 3, 1911 – June 2, 1937 (Retired)
	James Clark McReynolds	Associate Justice	Tennessee	Horace Harmon Lurton	August 29, 1914 (44–6)	October 12, 1914 – January 31, 1941 (Retired)
	Louis Brandeis	Associate Justice	Massachusetts	Joseph Rucker Lamar	June 1, 1916 (47–22)	June 5, 1916 – February 13, 1939 (Retired)
	George Sutherland	Associate Justice	Utah	John Hessin Clarke	September 5, 1922 (Acclamation)	October 2, 1922 – January 17, 1938 (Retired)
	Pierce Butler	Associate Justice	Minnesota	William R. Day	December 21, 1922 (61–8)	January 2, 1923 – November 16, 1939 (Died)
	Edward Terry Sanford	Associate Justice	Tennessee	Mahlon Pitney	January 29, 1923 (Acclamation)	February 19, 1923 – March 8, 1930 (Died)

== Notable cases in 261 U.S. ==
=== Moore v. Dempsey ===
In Moore v. Dempsey, 261 U.S. 86 (1923), the Supreme Court held that the African-American defendants' mob-dominated trials deprived them of due process guaranteed by the Due Process Clause of the Fourteenth Amendment. It reversed the U.S. district court's decision declining the petitioners' writ of habeas corpus. This case was a precedent for the Supreme Court's review of state criminal trials in terms of their compliance with the Bill of Rights. Moore is a significant precedent for wider use of federal writs of habeas corpus to review state court convictions that occurred under conditions abridging federal constitutional rights. It marked the beginning of stricter scrutiny by the Supreme Court of state criminal trials in terms of their compliance with the Bill of Rights. This ruling reduced the capacity of a local community "to permanently deprive or deny the rights of those who might be prosecuted in its courts."

=== United States v. Thind ===
United States v. Thind, 261 U.S. 204 (1923), is a Supreme Court decision that Bhagat Singh Thind, an Indian Sikh man who identified himself as an Aryan, was ineligible for naturalized citizenship in the United States. Thind had filed a petition for naturalization under the Naturalization Act of 1906 which allowed only "free white persons" and "aliens of African nativity and persons of African descent" to become United States citizens by naturalization. After his petition was granted, government attorneys initiated a proceeding to cancel Thind's naturalization. Thind did not challenge the constitutionality of the racial restrictions. Instead, he attempted to be classified as a "free white person" within the meaning of the Naturalization Act based on the fact that Indians and Europeans share common descent from Proto-Indo-Europeans. The Supreme Court rejected Thind's argument, adding that Thind did not meet a "common sense" definition of white. The Court concluded that "the term 'Aryan' has to do with linguistic, and not with physical characteristics.

=== Adkins v. Children's Hospital ===
In Adkins v. Children's Hospital, 261 U.S. 525 (1923), the Supreme Court ruled that federal minimum wage legislation for women was an unconstitutional infringement of liberty of contract, as protected by the due process clause of the Fifth Amendment. Adkins was eventually overturned in the 1937 decision West Coast Hotel Co. v. Parrish.

== Citation style ==
Under the Judiciary Act of 1789 the federal court structure at the time comprised District Courts, which had general trial jurisdiction; Circuit Courts, which had mixed trial and appellate (from the US District Courts) jurisdiction; and the United States Supreme Court, which had appellate jurisdiction over the federal District and Circuit courts—and for certain issues over state courts. The Supreme Court also had limited original jurisdiction (i.e., in which cases could be filed directly with the Supreme Court without first having been heard by a lower federal or state court). There were one or more federal District Courts and/or Circuit Courts in each state, territory, or other geographical region.

The Judiciary Act of 1891 created the United States Courts of Appeals and reassigned the jurisdiction of most routine appeals from the district and circuit courts to these appellate courts. The Act created nine new courts that were originally known as the "United States Circuit Courts of Appeals." The new courts had jurisdiction over most appeals of lower court decisions. The Supreme Court could review either legal issues that a court of appeals certified or decisions of court of appeals by writ of certiorari. On January 1, 1912, the effective date of the Judicial Code of 1911, the old Circuit Courts were abolished, with their remaining trial court jurisdiction transferred to the U.S. District Courts.

Bluebook citation style is used for case names, citations, and jurisdictions.

- "# Cir." = United States Court of Appeals
  - e.g., "3d Cir." = United States Court of Appeals for the Third Circuit
- "D." = United States District Court for the District of . . .
  - e.g.,"D. Mass." = United States District Court for the District of Massachusetts
- "E." = Eastern; "M." = Middle; "N." = Northern; "S." = Southern; "W." = Western
  - e.g.,"M.D. Ala." = United States District Court for the Middle District of Alabama
- "Ct. Cl." = United States Court of Claims
- The abbreviation of a state's name alone indicates the highest appellate court in that state's judiciary at the time.
  - e.g.,"Pa." = Supreme Court of Pennsylvania
  - e.g.,"Me." = Supreme Judicial Court of Maine

== List of cases in volume 261 U.S. ==
Case Name	Page and year	Opinion of the Court	Concurring opinion(s)	Dissenting opinion(s)	Lower Court	Disposition
Gorham Manufacturing Company v. Wendell	1 (1923)	Taft	none	none	S.D.N.Y.	motions granted
Vandenburgh v. Truscon Steel Company	6 (1923)	Taft	none	none	6th Cir.	affirmed
Concrete Steel Company v. Vendenburgh	16 (1923)	Taft	none	none	2d Cir.	reversed
Charles Nelson Company v. United States	17 (1923)	Taft	none	none	Ct. Cl.	affirmed
Crown Die and Tool Company v. Nye Tool and Machine Works	24 (1923)	Taft	none	none	7th Cir.	reversed
Eibel Process Company v. Minnesota and Ontario Paper Company	45 (1923)	Taft	none	none	1st Cir.	reversed
Pennsylvania Railroad Co. v. United States Railroad Labor Board	72 (1923)	Taft	none	none	7th Cir.	affirmed
Moore v. Dempsey	86 (1923)	Holmes	none	McReynolds	E.D. Ark.	reversed
Diaz v. Gonzalez	102 (1923)	Holmes	none	none	1st Cir.	reversed
United States Grain Corporation v. Phillips	106 (1923)	Holmes	none	none	2d Cir.	reversed
Rooker v. Fidelity Trust Company	114 (1923)	VanDevanter	none	none	Ind.	dismissed
Great Northern Railroad Company v. Steinke	119 (1923)	VanDevanter	none	none	N.D.	reversed
Kansas City Southern Railway Company v. Wolf	133 (1923)	McReynolds	none	none	8th Cir.	reversed
Minnesota Commercial Men's Association v. Benn	140 (1923)	McReynolds	none	none	Minn.	reversed
United States Shipping Board Emergency Fleet Corporation v. Sullivan	146 (1923)	McReynolds	none	none	Pa. Super. Ct.	dismissed
Durham Public Service Company v. City of Durham	149 (1923)	McReynolds	none	none	N.C.	affirmed
Valley Farms Company of Yonkers v. Westchester County	155 (1923)	McReynolds	none	none	N.Y. Sup. Ct.	affirmed
Douglas v. Noble	165 (1923)	Brandeis	none	none	W.D. Wash.	reversed
Bank of America v. Whitney Central National Bank	171 (1923)	Brandeis	none	none	S.D.N.Y.	affirmed
Lumiere v. Mae Edna Wilder, Inc.	174 (1923)	Brandeis	none	none	S.D.N.Y.	affirmed
A person or corporation cannot file suits under the Copyright Act in areas in which they do not have an office and do no business.
Price Fire and Water Proofing Company v. United States	179 (1923)	Brandeis	none	none	Ct. Cl.	affirmed
New England Divisions Case	184 (1923)	Brandeis	none	none	S.D.N.Y.	affirmed
United States v. Thind	204 (1923)	Sutherland	none	none	9th Cir.	certification
Brownlow v. Schwartz	216 (1923)	Sutherland	none	none	D.C. Cir.	reversed
Cramer v. United States	219 (1923)	Sutherland	none	none	9th Cir.	reversed
Columbia Railway, Gas and Electric Company v. South Carolina	236 (1923)	Sutherland	none	none	S.C.	reversed
Randall v. Tippecanoe County	252 (1923)	Sutherland	none	none	Ind.	dismissed
United States v. Oklahoma	253 (1923)	Butler	none	none	original	dismissed
Western and Atlantic Railroad v. Railroad Commission of Georgia	264 (1923)	Butler	none	none	N.D. Ga.	order vacated
Paducah v. Paducah Railroad Company	267 (1923)	Butler	none	none	W.D. Ky.	affirmed
Munter v. Weil Corset Company, Inc.	276 (1923)	McKenna	none	none	D. Conn.	reversed
Davis v. Dantzler Lumber Company	280 (1923)	McKenna	none	none	Miss.	reversed
Oklahoma Natural Gas Company v. Russell	290 (1923)	Holmes	none	none	W.D. Okla.	reversed
United States v. Benedict	294 (1923)	McReynolds	none	none	2d Cir.	affirmed
Seaboard Air Line Railroad Company v. United States	299 (1923)	Butler	none	none	4th Cir.	reversed
Pothier v. Rodman	307 (1923)	Taft	none	none	D.R.I.	docketing denied
City of New York v. New York Telephone Company	312 (1923)	Taft	none	none	S.D.N.Y.	dismissed
United States v. Allen	317 (1923)	McKenna	none	none	Ct. Cl.	affirmed
United States v. Moran	321 (1923)	McKenna	none	none	Ct. Cl.	affirmed
Ewen v. American Fidelity Company	322 (1923)	Holmes	none	none	2d Cir.	reversed
Fox Film Corporation v. Knowles	326 (1923)	Holmes	none	none	2d Cir.	reversed
Pullman Company v. Richardson	330 (1923)	VanDevanter	none	none	Cal.	affirmed
Oklahoma v. Texas	340 (1923)	per curiam	none	none	original	boundary set
Work v. United States ex rel. Mosier	352 (1923)	Taft	none	none	D.C. Cir.	reversed
United States v. Rider	363 (1923)	Taft	none	none	Ct. Cl.	reversed
St. Louis-San Francisco Railway Company v. Public Service Commission of Missouri	369 (1923)	McKenna	none	none	Mo.	reversed
Federal Land Bank of New Orleans v. Crosland	374 (1923)	Holmes	none	none	Ala.	reversed
Arkansas Natural Gas Company v. Arkansas Railroad Commission	379 (1923)	Sutherland	none	none	E.D. Ark.	affirmed
Baltimore and Ohio Railroad Company v. United States	385 (1923)	Sanford	none	none	Ct. Cl.	affirmed
Layne and Bowler Corporation v. Western Well Works, Inc.	387 (1923)	Taft	none	none	9th Cir.	dismissed
Hallanan v. Eureka Pipe Line Company	393 (1923)	Taft	none	none	W. Va.	dismissed
Hallanan v. United Fuel Gas Company	398 (1923)	Taft	none	none	W. Va.	dismissed
Toledo Scale Company v. Computing Scale Company	399 (1923)	Taft	none	none	7th Cir.	affirmed
Keller v. Potomac Electric Power Company	428 (1923)	Taft	none	none	D.C. Cir.	dismissed
Page Company v. Macdonald	446 (1923)	McKenna	none	none	D. Mass.	affirmed
Phipps v. Cleveland Refining Company	449 (1923)	McKenna	none	none	S.D. Ohio	affirmed
Gardner v. Chicago Title and Trust Company	453 (1923)	Holmes	none	none	7th Cir.	reversed
Wabash Railroad Company v. Elliott	457 (1923)	VanDevanter	none	none	Mo. Ct. App.	reversed
Federal Trade Commission v. Sinclair Refining Company	463 (1923)	McReynolds	none	none	multiple	affirmed
Hartford Life Insurance Company v. Douds	476 (1923)	McReynolds	none	none	Ohio	affirmed
Great Lakes Dredge and Dock Company v. Kierejewski	479 (1923)	McReynolds	none	none	W.D.N.Y.	affirmed
Thomas v. Kansas City Southern Railway Company	481 (1923)	Brandeis	none	none	8th Cir.	affirmed
Robinson v. United States	486 (1923)	Brandeis	none	none	Ct. Cl.	affirmed
Pusey and Jones Company v. Hanssen	491 (1923)	Brandeis	none	none	3d Cir.	reversed
Omnia Commercial Company, Inc. v. United States	502 (1923)	Sutherland	none	none	Ct. Cl.	affirmed
Russell Motor Car Company v. United States	514 (1923)	Sutherland	none	none	Ct. Cl.	affirmed
Adkins v. Children's Hospital	525 (1923)	Sutherland	none	Taft; Holmes	D.C. Cir.	affirmed
Watkins v. Sedberry	571 (1923)	Butler	none	none	6th Cir.	reversed
Hanson Lumber Company, Ltd. v. United States	581 (1923)	Butler	none	none	5th Cir.	affirmed
New York ex rel. Doyle v. Atwell	590 (1923)	Sanford	none	none	N.Y. Sup. Ct.	dismissed
Baltimore and Ohio Railroad Company v. United States	592 (1923)	Sanford	none	none	Ct. Cl.	affirmed
Hodges v. Snyder	600 (1923)	Sanford	none	none	Kingsbury County Cir. Ct.	affirmed
