= Moore v. Dempsey =

- Supreme Court of the United States

Argued January 9, 1923 Decided February 19, 1923
- Full case name: Frank Moore, et al. v. E. H. Dempsey, Keeper of Arkansas State Penitentiary
- Citations: 261 U.S. 86 (more) 43 S. Ct. 265; 67 L. Ed. 543; 1923 U.S. LEXIS 2529

Case history
- Prior: Defendants convicted, Phillips County, Arkansas; affirmed, Arkansas Supreme Court; certiorari denied, U.S. Supreme Court; petition for habeas corpus granted, Pulaski County, Arkansas; vacated, Arkansas Supreme Court; petition for habeas corpus denied, U.S. District Court for the Eastern District of Arkansas

Holding
- Mob-dominated trials were a violation of the Due Process Clause of the Fourteenth Amendment. Federal courts were furthermore duty-bound to review habeas corpus petitions that raised claims of discrimination in state trials, and to order the release of unfairly convicted defendants if the alleged violations were found to be true. Eastern District of Arkansas reversed and remanded.

Court membership
- Chief Justice William H. Taft Associate Justices Joseph McKenna · Oliver W. Holmes Jr. Willis Van Devanter · James C. McReynolds; Louis Brandeis · George Sutherland; Pierce Butler · Edward T. Sanford

Case opinions
- Majority: Holmes, joined by Taft, McKenna, Van Devanter, Brandeis, Butler
- Dissent: McReynolds, joined by Sutherland
- Sanford took no part in the consideration or decision of the case.

Laws applied
- U.S. Const. amend. XIV

Moore et al. v. Dempsey, 261 U.S. 86 (1923), was a United States Supreme Court case in which the Court ruled 6–2 that the defendants' mob-dominated trials deprived them of due process guaranteed by the Due Process Clause of the Fourteenth Amendment. It reversed the district court's decision declining the petitioners' writ of habeas corpus.

== The facts of the case ==
Moore v. Dempsey was the first case to come before the court in the 20th century related to the treatment of African Americans in the criminal justice systems of the South, where they lived in a segregated society that had disenfranchised them.

The case resulted from prosecution of twelve men for the death of a white man associated with the Elaine massacre in Phillips County, Arkansas. A white railroad security employee died on September 30, 1919, after shots were exchanged outside a church where a black tenant farmers union was meeting. With rumors of black insurrection, Governor Charles Hillman Brough led a deployment of federal troops into the rural county, arresting hundreds of blacks. Other blacks were allowed to be in public only with military passes. In the week after the shooting, roving bands of whites and federal troops killed upwards of 200 blacks.

In the aftermath, a grand jury made up of local landlords and merchants decided who would be indicted. Those blacks willing to testify against others and who agreed to work on whatever terms their landlords set for them were let go; those who had been labeled ringleaders or who were judged unreliable were indicted. According to the affidavits later supplied by the defendants, many of the prisoners had been beaten, whipped or tortured by electric shocks to extract testimony or confessions and threatened with death if they later recanted their testimony. Indictments were brought against 122 defendants, including 73 for murder.

On November 2, 1919, the Phillips County authorities began trying the defendants on charges of murder. Frank Hicks was charged with first degree murder of Clinton Lee, with Frank Moore, Ed Hicks, J. E. Knox, Paul Hall, and Ed Coleman charged as accessories. Hicks and a total of eleven defendants were sentenced to death after perfunctory trials: counsel for the accused, who did not meet their clients until the trial began, called no witnesses, produced no evidence, and did not call on the defendants to testify. The first trial took three-quarters of an hour, after which the all-white jury returned a guilty verdict on the first-degree murder charge in eight minutes. Later trials were just as short; the juries took less than ten minutes to reach a verdict in each case. A twelfth defendant was sentenced to death several weeks later, after the jury deliberated for four minutes.

Thirty-six other defendants chose to plead guilty to second-degree murder rather than face trial. Sixty-seven additional defendants went to trial and were convicted; they were sentenced to various terms of imprisonment.

The trials were dominated by white mobs; crowds of armed whites milled around the courthouse. As Justice Holmes later stated in his opinion, "There was never a chance of an acquittal," as the jurors feared the mob.^{1} The Arkansas Gazette applauded the trials as the triumph of the 'rule of law,' as none of the defendants had been lynched.

== The investigation ==
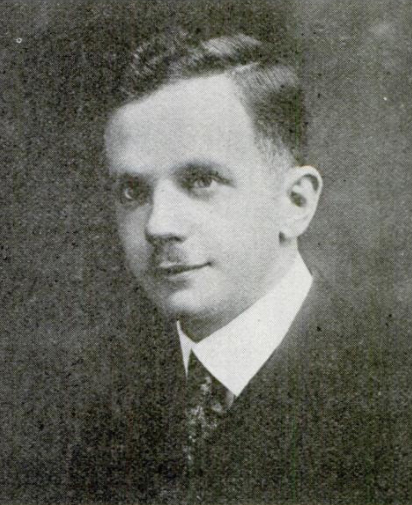
Walter F. White

The NAACP sent its assistant secretary, Walter F. White, to investigate the violence in October 1919. White, who was of mixed-race and blonde, used his appearance to pass for white when it was useful to his investigations of lynching and riots. He was granted credentials from the Chicago Daily News, which aided him in obtaining an interview with Governor Brough.

White was able to interview both whites and blacks in Phillips County, but had to cut his visit short after hearing rumors that he had been discovered as a person of color. White published his findings in the Daily News, the Chicago Defender and The Nation, as well as the NAACP's own magazine The Crisis, reporting on the high number of fatalities among blacks and the lack of government prosecution of their deaths.

== The appeal ==
The NAACP organized the appeal for defendants in the Elaine case. It raised more than $50,000 and hired Scipio Africanus Jones, an African-American attorney from Little Rock, and Colonel George W. Murphy, a Confederate veteran, former Attorney-General for the State of Arkansas, for the defense team.

The defendants' cases took two paths. The defendants' lawyers obtained reversal of the verdicts by the Arkansas Supreme Court in six of the cases: Ed Ware, Will Wordlow, Albert Giles, Joe Fox, Alf Banks Jr., and John Martin (henceforth Ware et al.) due to a defect in the wording of the jury verdict. The court ruled that the jury had failed to specify whether the defendants were guilty of murder in the first or second degree; those cases were accordingly sent back to the lower court for retrial. They were convicted again, but the state supreme court overturned the verdicts, saying that discrimination against black jurors (the juries were all-white) was contrary to the Fourteenth Amendment and the Civil Rights Act of 1875. Because the lower court had not acted upon their cases for more than two years by April 1923, under Arkansas law the defendants were entitled to be released. Jones applied for and gained an order for their release from the Arkansas Supreme Court on June 25, 1923.

The Arkansas Supreme Court upheld the death sentences of Moore and the other five murder defendants, rejecting the challenge to the all-white jury as untimely. It found that the mob atmosphere and use of coerced testimony did not deny the defendants the due process of law. Those defendants unsuccessfully petitioned the United States Supreme Court for a writ of certiorari from the Arkansas Supreme Court's decision.

The defendants petitioned for a writ of habeas corpus, alleging that the proceedings that took place in the Arkansas state court, while ostensibly complying with trial requirements, satisfied these only in form. They argued that the accused were convicted under pressure of the armed mob, with blatant disregard for their constitutional rights, and that pre-trial publicity had prejudiced the proceedings. The defense team had originally intended to file this petition in federal court, but the only sitting judge was assigned to other judicial duties in Minnesota at the time and would not return to Arkansas until after the defendants' scheduled execution date. The state chancery court issued the writ. Although it was later overturned by the State Supreme Court, this process postponed the execution date long enough to permit the defendants to seek habeas corpus relief in federal court.

The state of Arkansas argued a narrowly legalistic position, based on the United States Supreme Court's earlier decision in Frank v. Mangum (1915). The State did not dispute the defendants' evidence of torture used to obtain confessions or mob intimidation, but argued that, even if true, this did not amount to a denial of due process. The federal district court agreed, denying the writ.

== The Case ==
=== U.S. Supreme Court Proceedings ===
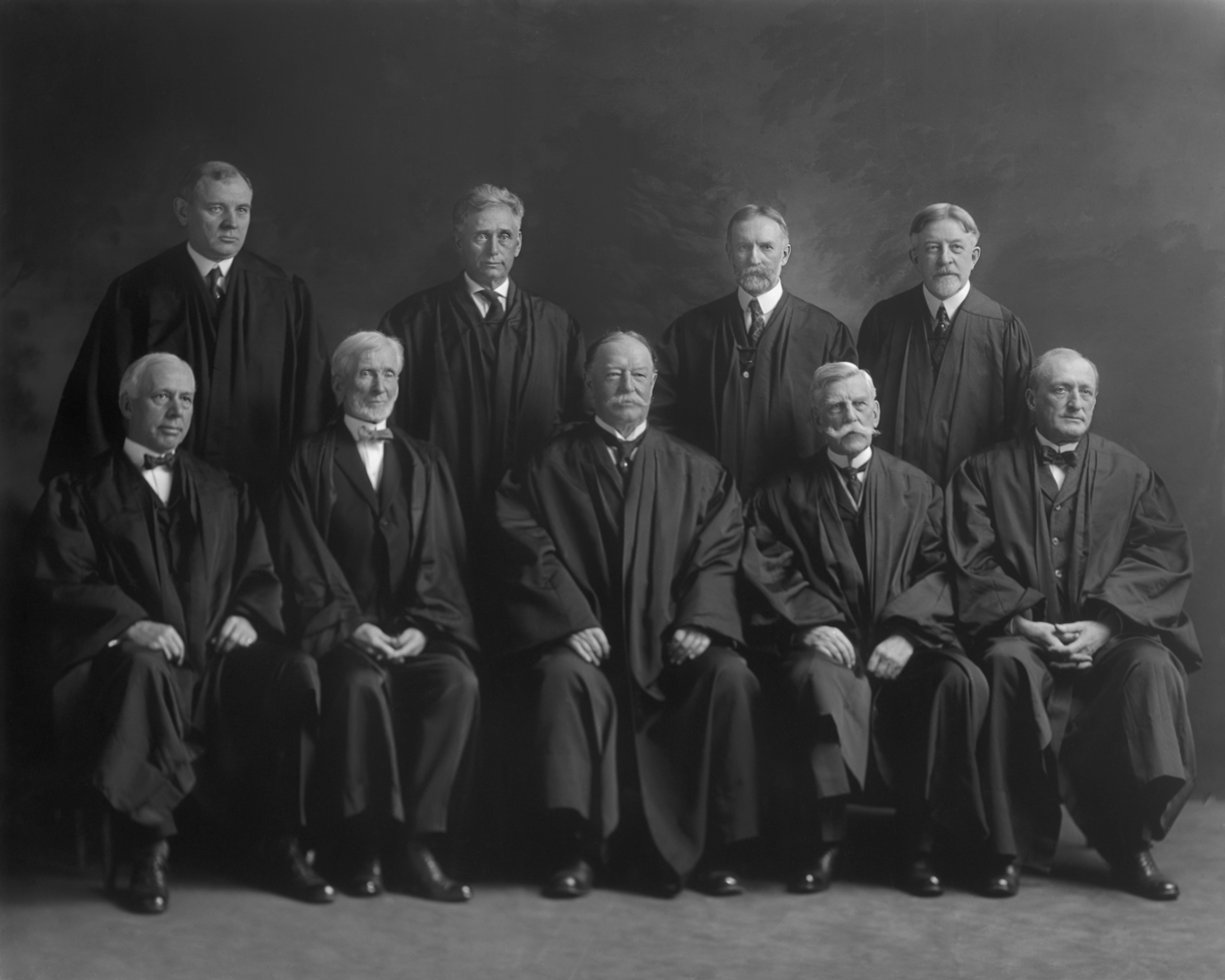
The Taft Court

The Court did not consider issues related to the convictions of the accused black men, but rather whether their rights were abridged under the Due Process Clause of the Fourteenth Amendment by the process of the trial. In a 6–2 decision, Justice Holmes wrote for the Court that a mob-dominated trial violated the due process provisions. He also said that federal courts, upon being petitioned for a writ of habeas corpus, were compelled to review such claims of discrimination in state trials and to order the release of defendants judged unfairly convicted.

=== Opinions ===
==== Justice Oliver W. Holmes, Jr. ====
In his majority opinion, Associate Justice Holmes outlined the pertinent facts of the case, in a somewhat acerbic manner,^{2} before proceeding to the Court's considerations and decision.

The Court had previously ruled in Frank v. Mangum 237 U.S. 309 (1915) that, while mob interference with a criminal trial would amount to a denial of the due process promised by the Fourteenth Amendment, a defendant whose constitutional rights were violated could challenge a conviction only by appealing in the state courts. This foreclosed any federal review of the allegations of mob intimidation. While Moore did not overrule Frank, Justice Holmes drew heavily on his dissent in Frank to hold that a federal court presented with a habeas corpus petition must examine the facts presented in order to determine if the defendants' rights had been violated.

Holmes' opinion acknowledged the rule in Frank, while holding that subsequent judicial review would not cure constitutional violations if the state courts, in fact, had failed to correct the wrong:

We assume in accordance with that case that the corrective process supplied by the State may be so adequate that interference by habeas corpus ought not to be allowed. It certainly is true that mere mistakes of law in the course of a trial are not to be corrected in that way. But if the case is that the whole proceeding is a mask—that counsel, jury and judge were swept to the fatal end by an irresistible wave of public passion, and that the State Courts failed to correct the wrong, neither perfection in the machinery for correction nor the possibility that the trial court and counsel saw no other way of avoiding an immediate outbreak of the mob can prevent this Court from securing to the petitioners their constitutional rights.

The Court therefore remanded the matter to the federal district court for it to determine if the defendants' claims of mob intimidation and coerced testimony were true:

We shall not say more concerning the corrective process afforded to the petitioners than that it does not seem to us sufficient to allow a Judge of the United States to escape the duty of examining the facts for himself when if true as alleged they make the trial absolutely void. We have confined the statement to facts admitted by the demurrer. We will not say that they cannot be met, but it appears to us unavoidable that the District Judge should find whether the facts alleged are true and whether they can be explained so far as to leave the state proceedings undisturbed.

==== McReynolds' dissent ====
Justice James C. McReynolds, joined by Justice George Sutherland, deemed the issue at stake to be "one of gravity". He suggested that if any man convicted of a crime in a state court may try his luck with the federal court by swearing that some events that have abridged his constitutionally protected rights took place, the already long list of permitted delays in punishment would grow even longer.

== Effects of the Decision ==
Per the Court's ruling, the case was sent back to lower courts. The prosecution and defense eventually "agreed that the Moore defendants would plead guilty to charges of murder in the second degree, with their sentences to be retroactively counted." On November 11, 1925, their sentences were commuted by Governor T.C. McRae. They were released several months later. Arkansas also freed the other defendants who had been convicted of lesser charges and who were still imprisoned.

Moore is significant for establishing precedent for wider use of federal writs of habeas corpus to oversee state court convictions that occurred under conditions that violated federal constitutional rights. It marked the beginning of stricter scrutiny by the Supreme Court of state criminal trials in terms of their compliance with the Bill of Rights. This ruling reduced the capacity of a local community "to permanently deprive or deny the rights of those who might be prosecuted in its courts."

== See also ==
- Palko v. Connecticut

== Footnotes ==
- ^1 From Justice Holmes’ opinion: "According to the allegations and affidavits there never was a chance for the petitioners to be acquitted; no juryman could have voted for an acquittal and continued to live in Phillips County and if any prisoner by any chance had been acquitted by a jury he could not have escaped the mob."
- ^2 When commenting on the Committee of Seven, who apparently solemnly promised to a lynch-ready mob that "the law would be carried out", for example, Holmes notes that "According to affidavits of two white men and the colored witnesses on whose testimony the petitioners were convicted, […] the Committee made good their promise by calling colored witnesses and having them whipped and tortured until they would say what was wanted…"
