= Carver High School =

"Carver High School" or "George Washington Carver High School" may refer to one of the following public secondary schools in the United States:

== Alabama ==
- George Washington Carver High School (Birmingham, Alabama)
- George Washington Carver High School (Decatur, Alabama) (closed 1966)
- George Washington Carver High School (Dothan, Alabama) (closed 1969)
- George Washington Carver High School (Montgomery, Alabama)

== Arizona ==
- Carver High School (Phoenix, Arizona), also known as George Washington Carver High School (closed 1954)

== Arkansas ==
- George Washington Carver High School (Augusta, Arkansas), (closed 1970)
- George Washington Carver High School (Marked Tree, Arkansas), (closed 1966)
- Carver High School (Lonoke, Arkansas), (closed 1970)

== California ==
- George Washington Carver School of Arts and Sciences in Rancho Cordova, California, opened in 2008

== Florida ==
- Carver Heights High School, Leesburg, Florida
- Carver-Hill School, Crestview, Florida, integrated into Crestview High School in 1965
- George Washington Carver High School (Bunnell, Florida), closed 1970
- George Washington Carver School (Coral Gables, Florida), closed 1970
- George Washington Carver High School (Delray Beach, Florida), closed 1970
- George Washington Carver High School (Naples, Florida), closed 1968

== Georgia ==
- The New Schools at Carver, formerly called Carver High School, Atlanta, Georgia
- George Washington Carver High School (Carrollton, Georgia)
- George Washington Carver High School (Columbus, Georgia)
- Carver High School (Dawson, Georgia), a school for African Americans

== Illinois ==
- Carver Military Academy, formerly known as Carver High School, Chicago, Illinois

== Louisiana ==
- G. W. Carver High School (Hahnville, Louisiana)
- G. W. Carver High School (New Orleans)
- George Washington Carver High School (Caddo Parish, Louisiana) (1957-1973), later known as Ellerbe Road School
- George Washington Carver High School (DeRidder, Louisiana) (1953-1970), now an elementary school
- George Washington Carver High School (Kinder, Louisiana) (1950-1970)

== Maryland ==
- Carver Vocational-Technical High School (School #454), Baltimore City, Maryland
- George Washington Carver Center for Arts and Technology, formerly called George Washington Carver High School, Baltimore County, Maryland
- George Washington Carver High School (Cumberland, Maryland), closed 1959
- George Washington Carver High School (Rockville, Maryland), closed 1960

== Massachusetts ==
- Carver Middle High School, Carver, Massachusetts

== Mississippi ==
- Allen Carver High School, Charleston, Mississippi closed 1971, black students attend East Tallahatchie High School, became Charleston Middle School
- Carver High School (Pascagoula, Mississippi), closed 1971
- George Washington Carver High School, formerly Hopewell High School, near Philadelphia, Mississippi, closed 1970
- George Washington Carver High School (Picayune, Mississippi), closed 1971
- Carver High School (Tupelo, Mississippi), closed 1971

== Missouri ==
- George Washington Carver School (Fulton, Missouri)

== New York ==
- George Washington Carver High School, part of the Springfield Gardens High School complex in Springfield Gardens, New York

== North Carolina ==
- George Washington Carver High School (Kannapolis, North Carolina) (closed 1967, reopened as elementary)
- Carver High School (Winston-Salem, North Carolina)

== Pennsylvania ==
- Carver High School (Philadelphia, Pennsylvania)

== South Carolina ==
- George Washington Carver High School (Spartanburg, South Carolina) (closed 1970), now Carver Junior High

== Tennessee ==
- George Washington Carver High School (Brownsville, Tennessee) (closed 1970)
- George Washington Carver High School (Memphis, Tennessee)

== Texas ==
- George Washington Carver High School (Baytown, Texas)
- George Washington Carver High School (Ennis, Texas)
- Carver High School (Houston, Texas)
- Carver High School (Lockhart, Texas)
- George Washington Carver High School (Midland, Texas) (closed 1968), now an elementary school for the gifted/talented
- George Washington Carver High School (Navasota, Texas)
- George Washington Carver High School (Sweeny, Texas) (closed 1966)
- George Washington Carver High School (Waco, Texas) (1956-1970), became a YMCA, later a sixth grade

== Virginia ==
- Carver-Price High School, Appomattox, Virginia (closed 1970)
- George Washington Carver High School (Chesterfield, Virginia) (closed 1970)
- George Washington Carver High School (Martinsville, Virginia)
- George Washington Carver Regional High School, now George Washington Carver-Piedmont Technical Education Center, Rapidan, Virginia (1948–1968)
