= Fitzhugh Snapp Company =

- U.S. National Register of Historic Places
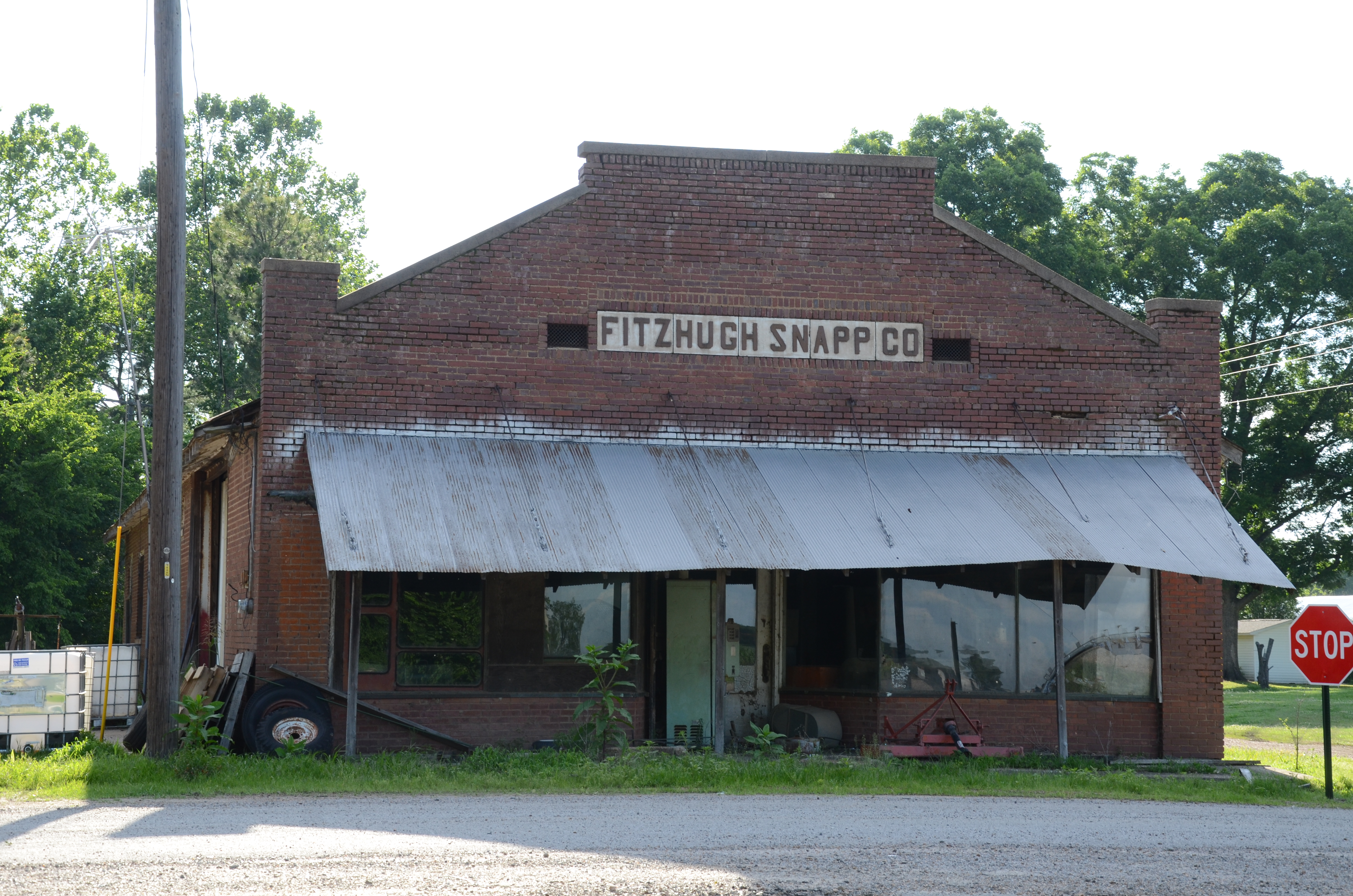

- Location within Arkansas Location within the United States
- Location: Jct. of Cty Rd. 140 and Cty Rd. 165, Fitzhugh, Arkansas
- Coordinates: 35°21′35″N 91°19′23″W
- Area: less than one acre
- Built: 1935
- Architectural style: Early Commercial
- MPS: Cotton and Rice Farm History and Architecture in the Arkansas Delta MPS
- NRHP reference No.: 04001069
- Added to NRHP: January 18, 2005

The Fitzhugh Snapp Company is a historic commercial building in rural Woodruff County, Arkansas. It is located at the southwest corner of County Roads 140 and 165 in the northern part of the county, about 6 miles (9.7 km) north of Augusta. It is a single-story structure, built out of load-bearing brick, and finished (as of 2005) with diamond-shaped asbestos shingles. A porch shelters the main (east-facing) facade; it is covered by corrugated metal. A parapet above has a panel identifying the building. Built in 1935, it served the rural cotton-farming community until 1981.

The building was listed on the National Register of Historic Places in 2005.

== See also ==
- National Register of Historic Places listings in Woodruff County, Arkansas
