= Jim Marsalis =

American football player (born 1945)

No. 40
- Position: Cornerback

Personal information
- Born: October 10, 1945 (age 81); Pascagoula, Mississippi, U.S.
- Listed height: 5 ft 11 in (1.80 m)
- Listed weight: 194 lb (88 kg)

Career information
- High school: Carver (Pascagoula)
- College: Tennessee A&I
- NFL draft: 1969: 1st round, 23rd overall pick

Career history
- Kansas City Chiefs (1969–1975); New Orleans Saints (1977)

Awards and highlights
- Super Bowl champion (IV); AFL champion (1969); PFW AFL Defensive Rookie of the Year (1969); First-team All-Pro (1970); Pro Bowl (1970); AFL All-Star (1969); Second-team All-American (1968); First-team Little All-American (1968)

Career NFL/AFL statistics
- Interceptions: 15
- Interception yards: 116
- Fumble recoveries: 6
- Sacks: 1
- Stats at Pro Football Reference

James Marsalis (born October 10, 1945) is an American former professional football player who was a cornerback for nine seasons in the American Football League (AFL) and National Football League (NFL).

== Early life ==
Marsalis was born on October 10, 1945, in Pascagoula, Mississippi. He attended Carver High School, where he played football.

== College career ==
Marsalis played college football at Tennessee A&I (now Tennessee State University) from 1965 to 1968, under coach "Big John" Merritt, before playing professionally from 1969 through 1977. He was dominant enough as a cornerback to have only one touchdown thrown against him in four seasons of college football.

In 1968, Marsalis was named an All-American by both The Sporting News and Time Magazine. He vaulted into the conscience of professional scouts at the 1968 Blue-Gray All-Star Classic by intercepting a record three passes in the game. He was Senior of the Year at Tennessee.

== Professional career ==
Marsalis was selected in the first round of the 1969 NFL Draft by the AFL's Kansas City Chiefs (23rd overall). An immediate starter at cornerback, Marsalis helped the Chiefs defeat the defending league champion New York Jets in the first game of the 1969 AFL playoffs, with two interceptions off the Jets' Joe Namath. After the Chiefs won the final AFL Championship Game a week later in Oakland against the Raiders 16–6, where Marsalis had another interception, he started in the Super Bowl IV, the Fourth AFL-NFL World Championship Game. The Chiefs, defeated the Minnesota Vikings in the last World Championship game played between the AFL and NFL champions.

A two-time Pro Bowler with the Chiefs (1970 and 1971), Marsalis was selected by Pro Football Weekly and the NFL Players Association as the 1969 AFL Defensive Rookie of the Year. He was also selected All Pro in 1970. A physical player, Marsalis' style of play as a defensive back was often associated with the physical "bump and run" tactics that would eventually be outlawed by the NFL.

After playing for the Chiefs through the 1976 season, Marsalis would play his last two professional seasons with the New Orleans Saints, retiring after the 1978 season. For his efforts at the college and professional level, Marsalis was selected to the Tennessee Sports Hall of Fame in 2012.

== Later life ==
In 2023, Marshalis was inducted into the Black College Football Hall of Fame. Marsalis would later work in banking as a loan officer. He briefly served as a defensive secondary coach at Middle Georgia.
