= National Register of Historic Places listings in Woodruff County, Arkansas =

Location of Woodruff County in Arkansas

This is a list of the National Register of Historic Places listings in Woodruff County, Arkansas.

This is intended to be a complete list of the properties and districts on the National Register of Historic Places in Woodruff County, Arkansas, United States. The locations of National Register properties and districts for which the latitude and longitude coordinates are included below, may be seen in a map.

There are 17 properties and districts listed on the National Register in the county.

Contents: Counties in Arkansas
- Arkansas
- Ashley
- Baxter
- Benton
- Boone
- Bradley
- Calhoun
- Carroll
- Chicot
- Clark
- Clay
- Cleburne
- Cleveland
- Columbia
- Conway
- Craighead
- Crawford
- Crittenden
- Cross
- Dallas
- Desha
- Drew
- Faulkner
- Franklin
- Fulton
- Garland
- Grant
- Greene
- Hempstead
- Hot Spring
- Howard
- Independence
- Izard
- Jackson
- Jefferson
- Johnson
- Lafayette
- Lawrence
- Lee
- Lincoln
- Little River
- Logan
- Lonoke
- Madison
- Marion
- Miller
- Mississippi
- Monroe
- Montgomery
- Nevada
- Newton
- Ouachita
- Perry
- Phillips
- Pike
- Poinsett
- Polk
- Pope
- Prairie
- Pulaski (Little Rock)
- Randolph
- St. Francis
- Saline
- Scott
- Searcy
- Sebastian
- Sevier
- Sharp
- Stone
- Union
- Van Buren
- Washington
- White
- Woodruff
- Yell

This National Park Service list is complete through NPS recent listings posted December 19, 2025.

== Current listings ==
	Name on the Register	Image	Date listed	Location	City or town	Description
1	Augusta Commercial Historic District	Augusta Commercial Historic District	August 27, 2008 (#08000817)	Roughly bounded by 1st, Locust, Main, 2nd, and Pearl Sts. 35°17′01″N 91°22′01″W	Augusta	
2	Augusta Electrical Generating Plant	Augusta Electrical Generating Plant	September 23, 2010 (#10000788)	Southwest corner of 5th and Locust Sts. 35°17′00″N 91°21′47″W	Augusta	
3	Augusta Memorial Park Historic Section	Augusta Memorial Park Historic Section	June 5, 2003 (#03000507)	Bounded by Iris, Rose, and Hough Drives and Highway 33B; 35°17′22″N 91°21′44″W	Augusta	
4	Augusta Presbyterian Church	Augusta Presbyterian Church	October 16, 1986 (#86002873)	3rd and Walnut Sts. 35°17′11″N 91°21′57″W	Augusta	
5	Cotton Plant Commercial Historic District	Cotton Plant Commercial Historic District	September 25, 2008 (#08000946)	Main St. roughly between Pine and Ash Sts. 35°00′17″N 91°15′09″W	Cotton Plant	
6	Cotton Plant Water Tower	Cotton Plant Water Tower	June 4, 2008 (#08000490)	Junction of N. Main and N. Vine Sts. 35°00′16″N 91°14′58″W	Cotton Plant	
7	Ferguson House	Ferguson House	December 6, 1975 (#75000419)	416 N. 3rd St. 35°17′09″N 91°21′53″W	Augusta	Demolished 2022.
8	Fitzhugh Snapp Company	Fitzhugh Snapp Company	January 18, 2005 (#04001069)	Junction of County Roads 140 and 165; 35°21′35″N 91°19′23″W	Fitzhugh	
9	George Washington Carver High School Home Economics Building	George Washington Carver High School Home Economics Building	January 15, 2004 (#03001381)	900 Pearl St. 35°17′10″N 91°21′26″W	Augusta	
10	Gregory House	Gregory House	October 17, 2012 (#12000858)	300 S. 2nd St. 35°16′54″N 91°22′00″W	Augusta	
11	Jess Norman Post 166 American Legion Hut	Jess Norman Post 166 American Legion Hut	October 14, 2001 (#01001100)	222 S. 1st St. 35°16′54″N 91°22′04″W	Augusta	
12	Mathis-Hyde House	Mathis-Hyde House	May 25, 2011 (#11000304)	400 N. 2nd St. 35°17′11″N 91°22′00″W	Augusta	
13	McCrory Commercial Historic District	McCrory Commercial Historic District	September 23, 2010 (#10000781)	Roughly Edmonds Ave. between Railroad & Third Sts. 35°15′26″N 91°12′00″W	McCrory	
14	McCrory Waterworks	McCrory Waterworks	September 20, 2007 (#07000968)	Junction of N. Fakes and W. 3rd 35°15′28″N 91°12′02″W	McCrory	
15	Dr. John William Morris Clinic	Dr. John William Morris Clinic	October 5, 2009 (#09000801)	118 W. Main St. 35°15′23″N 91°11′59″W	McCrory	
16	Revel General Store		September 27, 2003 (#03000952)	Junction of Highway 260 and County Road 17; 35°13′48″N 91°16′54″W	Revel	
17	Woodruff County Courthouse	Woodruff County Courthouse	December 22, 1982 (#82000959)	500 N. 3rd St. 35°17′15″N 91°21′52″W	Augusta	

== Former listings ==
	Name on the Register	Image	Date listed	Date removed	Location	City or town	Description
1	Augusta Bridge	Augusta Bridge	April 9, 1990 (#90000505)	September 14, 2002	U.S. Route 64, over the White River	Augusta	Demolished by explosives on September 12, 2001.

== See also ==
- List of National Historic Landmarks in Arkansas
- National Register of Historic Places listings in Arkansas
