= Augusta Electrical Generating Plant =

- August Electrical Generating Plant
- U.S. National Register of Historic Places
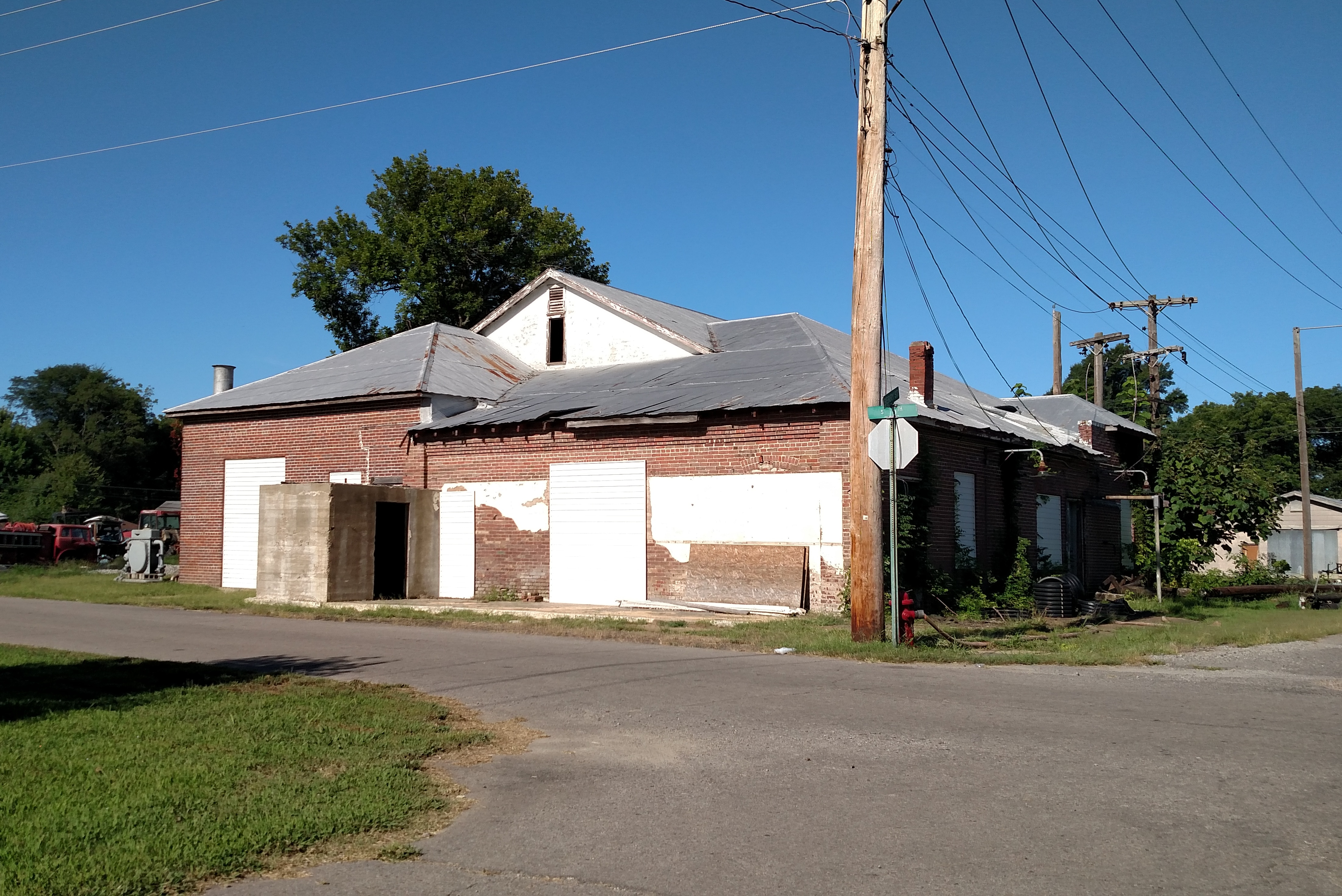

- Location within Arkansas Location within the United States
- Location: Southwest corner of 5th and Locust Sts., Augusta, Arkansas
- Coordinates: 35°17′0″N 91°21′47″W
- Area: 2 acres (0.81 ha)
- Built: c. 1905
- Architectural style: Early Commercial
- NRHP reference No.: 10000788
- Added to NRHP: September 23, 2010

The Augusta Electrical Generating Plant is a historic power station at the southwest corner of 5th and Locust Streets in Augusta, Arkansas. It is a single-story brick building, with a multi-section corrugated metal roof and a concrete foundation. One portion of the roof has a gable-on-hip configuration, while the other section is hipped. The main portion of the building dates to about 1905 by the city as part of its early push for electrification. The building was expanded several times until the early 1940s, when it achieved its present form.

The building was listed on the National Register of Historic Places in 2010, where it is incorrectly listed at 5th and Spruce Streets.

== See also ==
- National Register of Historic Places listings in Woodruff County, Arkansas
