= Mathis-Hyde House =

Historic house in Arkansas, United States

- Hyde House
- U.S. National Register of Historic Places
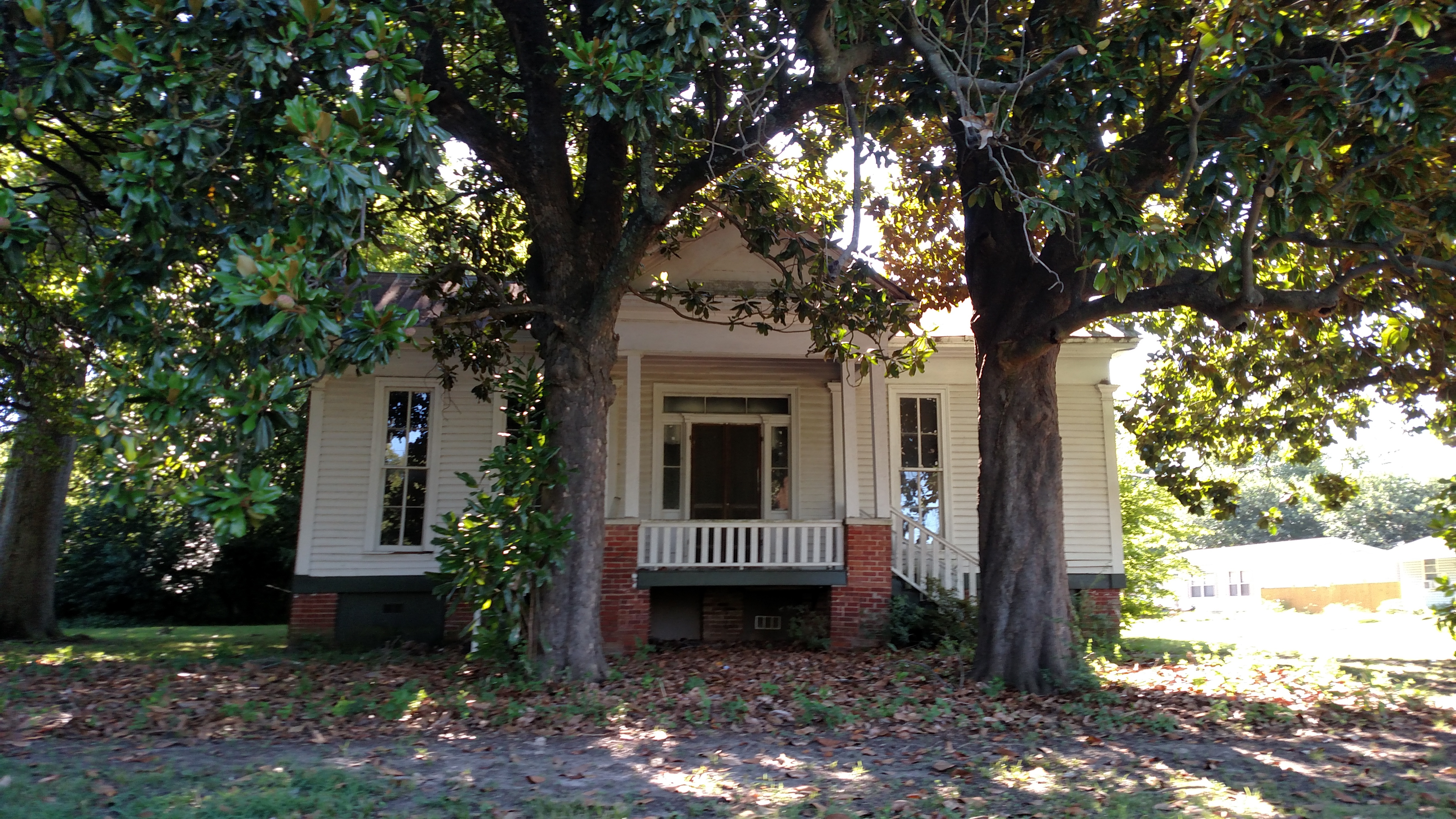

- Location within Arkansas Location within the United States
- Location: 400 N. 2nd St., Augusta, Arkansas
- Coordinates: 35°17′11″N 91°22′0″W
- Area: 2 acres (0.81 ha)
- Built: 1865
- Architectural style: Greek Revival
- NRHP reference No.: 11000304
- Added to NRHP: May 25, 2011

The Hyde House is a historic house at 400 North Second Street in Augusta, Arkansas. It is a single-story wood-frame structure, three bays wide, with a front facing gable roof and a temple-front porch sheltering its centered entrance. The entrance is flanked by sidelight windows and topped by a three-light transom window. The porch has a wide freeze and pedimented gable, and is supported by round columns with simple capitals. Built c. 1865, it is a fine local example of Greek Revival architecture.

The house was listed on the National Register of Historic Places in 2011.

== See also ==
- National Register of Historic Places listings in Woodruff County, Arkansas
