= Ferguson House (Augusta, Arkansas) =

Historic house in Arkansas, United States

- U.S. National Register of Historic Places
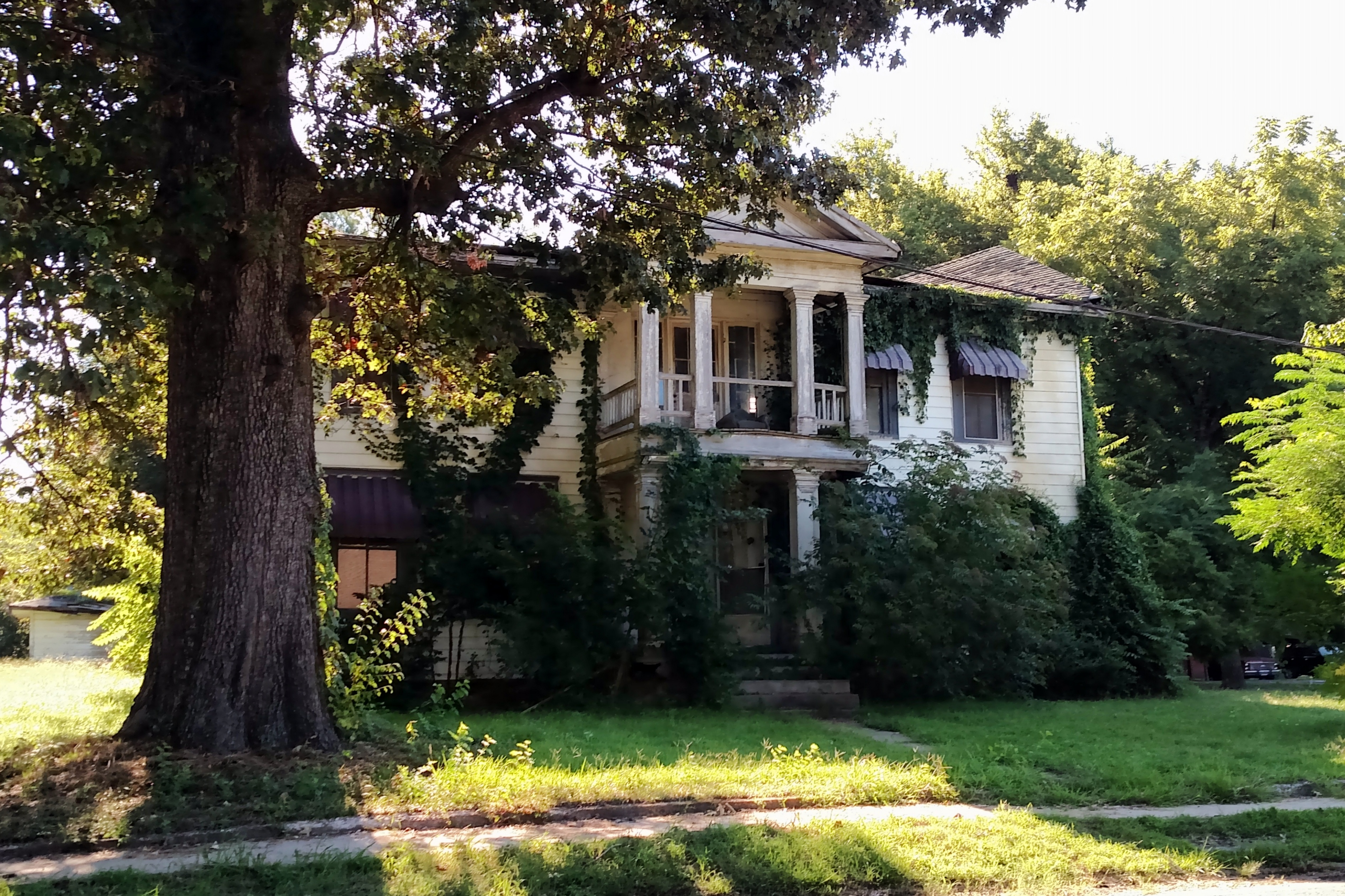

- Location within Arkansas Location within the United States
- Location: 416 N. 3rd St., Augusta, Arkansas
- Coordinates: 35°17′9″N 91°21′53″W
- Area: less than one acre
- Built: 1858
- Built by: James P. Ferguson
- Architectural style: Greek Revival
- NRHP reference No.: 75000419
- Added to NRHP: December 6, 1975

The Ferguson House was a historic house at 416 North Third Street in Augusta, Arkansas. It was a two-story wood-frame structure, with a side gable roof and clapboard siding. Its main facade was five bays wide, with a central projecting portico with square supporting columns, and a gabled pediment. The interior had a well-preserved central-hall plan. It was built in 1861 by James and Maria Ferguson, and is one of the city's oldest buildings.

The house was listed on the National Register of Historic Places in 1975.

The Ferguson House was demolished in 2022.

== See also ==
- National Register of Historic Places listings in Woodruff County, Arkansas
