= Augusta Memorial Park =

Historic cemetery in Arkansas, United States

- Augusta Memorial Park Historic Section
- U.S. National Register of Historic Places
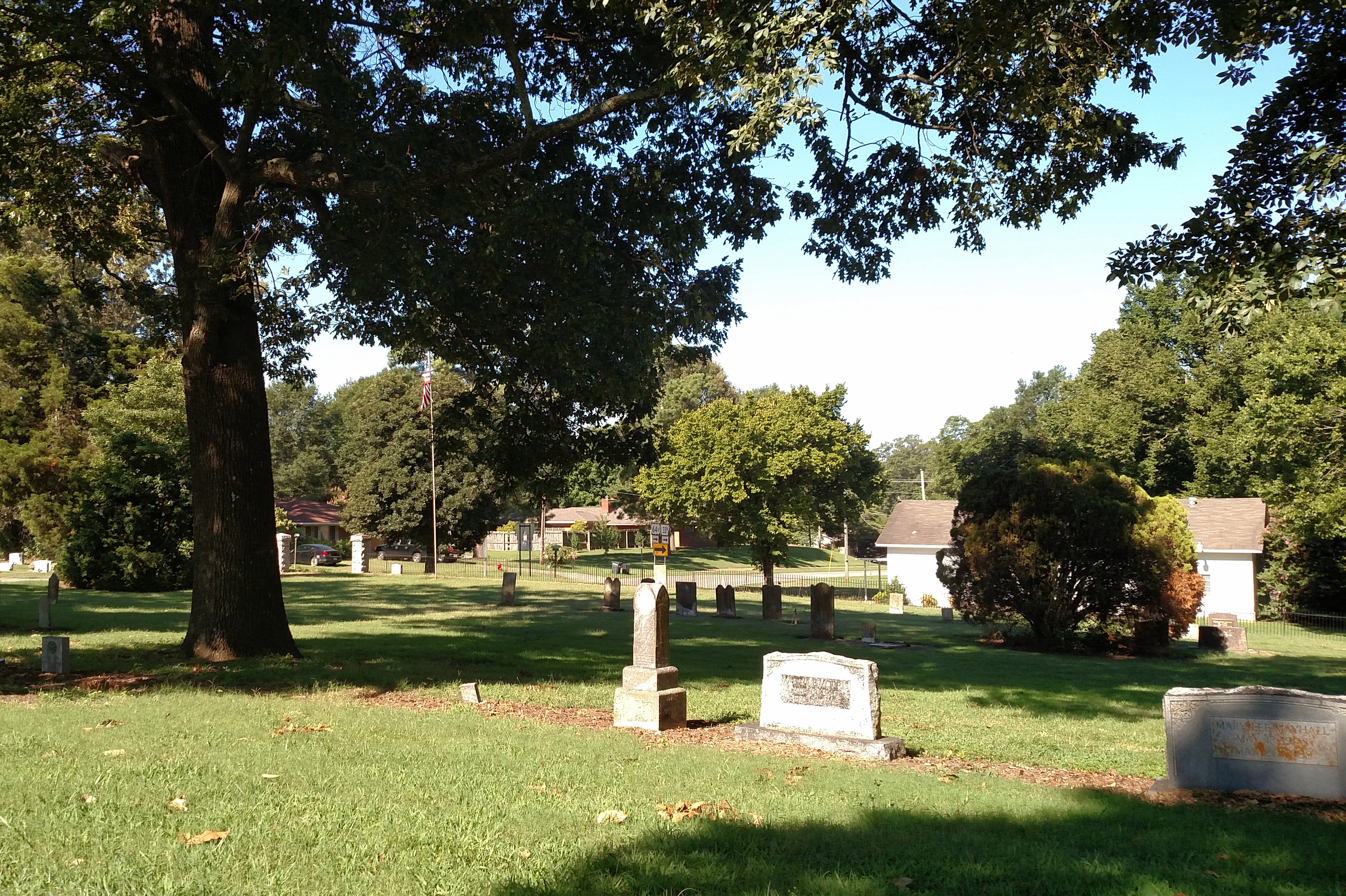

- Location within Arkansas Location within the United States
- Location: Bounded by Iris, Rose, Hough Drives and AR 33B, Augusta, Arkansas
- Coordinates: 35°17′22″N 91°21′44″W
- Area: 5 acres (2.0 ha)
- Built: 1852
- NRHP reference No.: 03000507
- Added to NRHP: June 5, 2003

Augusta Memorial Park is a cemetery in Augusta, Arkansas. It is located in the northeastern part of the city, accessible via Arkansas Highway 33B. The cemetery was established in 1852, on what is reported by local historians to be a Native American burial mound. The cemetery dates to the earliest period of the city's history, and is where many of its first settlers are buried. The cemetery is roughly L-shaped, with the oldest, northwestern portion at the corner of the L. A 5-acre (2.0 ha) section of the cemetery was listed on the National Register of Historic Places in 2003 for its historical associations.

== Notable burials ==
- Billy Ray Smith Sr. (1935–2001), Professional football player
- Harvey Lee Haley (1935-2023), Musician and Teacher

== See also ==
- National Register of Historic Places listings in Woodruff County, Arkansas
