= Larry Robinson (American football) =

American football player (born 1951)

No. 45
- Position: Running back

Personal information
- Born: April 6, 1951 (age 75); Appomattox, Virginia, U.S.
- Listed height: 6 ft 4 in (1.93 m)
- Listed weight: 210 lb (95 kg)

Career information
- High school: Carver-Price (Appomattox)
- College: Tennessee (basketball)
- NFL draft: 1973: undrafted

Career history
- Dallas Cowboys (1973)

Awards and highlights
- Third-team All-SEC (1973)

Career NFL statistics
- Games played: 4
- Stats at Pro Football Reference

Lawrence Cordill Robinson (born April 6, 1951) is an American former professional football player who was a running back for the Dallas Cowboys of the National Football League (NFL). He played college basketball for the Tennessee Volunteers.

== Early life ==
Robinson attended Carver-Price High School in Appomattox, Virginia, before moving on to Ferrum College. He helped his team reach the NJCAA National Tournament in consecutive years and received NJCAA All-American honors in 1971.

He transferred to the University of Tennessee for the 1971–1972 season and became the school's second African American basketball player (Wilbert Cherry was the first one). He contributed to the team being the SEC co-champion.

The next year, he was named team captain. He finished his career with an average of 10.9 ppg and 8.8 rpg, while shooting 60% from the floor. He led the team in field-goal shooting and rebounding in both years.

In 1994, he was inducted into the Ferrum College Sports Hall of Fame.

== Professional career ==
Robinson was signed as an undrafted free agent after the 1973 NFL draft. He was a college basketball player who never played a down of college football, whom the Dallas Cowboys converted into a running back.

On September 19, Robinson was placed on the inactive list and spent most of the season on the taxi squad. As a rookie, he played in four games and was used mainly as a kick returner. Robinson was waived on September 10, 1974.

== Personal life ==
Robinson became the first African American coach in the history of the University of Tennessee, when he was hired as an assistant football coach on October 8, 1974.
