= Wilbert H. Cherry =

American lawyer

Wilbert Harris Cherry (April 11, 1952;– August 4, 2007) participated in the desegregation of U.S. college basketball as the first African American to play basketball for the University of Tennessee, in 1970–1971, and one of the first two African Americans (Larry Robinson was the other one) to play on the university's varsity team, in 1971–1972.

Cherry was born in Dayton, Tennessee. He grew up in Morristown, Tennessee, and the Karns community of Knox County, where he attended Karns High School.

After high school, Cherry went on to the University of Tennessee-Knoxville, where he was a walk-on basketball player. He appeared in 18 games for the freshman team in 1970–1971. In the 1971–1972 season, he and Larry Robinson, a junior college transfer with an athletic scholarship, became the first African-Americans to play on the university's varsity team. In 1971–72 Cherry played in four varsity games, making him a member of the 1972 team that won the Southeastern Conference (SEC) championship. A five-foot-eleven-inch point guard, Cherry was cut from the team after that season.

Cherry completed his undergraduate and J.D. degrees at the University of Tennessee-Knoxville and an MBA at the University of Tennessee at Chattanooga. He worked for the Tennessee Valley Authority before entering the practice of law in Knoxville. He died on August 4, 2007.
