= Revel General Store =

- U.S. National Register of Historic Places
- Location within Arkansas Location within the United States
- Location: Jct. of AR 260 and Woodruff Cty Rd. 17, Revel, Arkansas
- Coordinates: 35°13′48″N 91°16′54″W
- Area: less than one acre
- Built: 1908
- Architectural style: Plain/Traditional
- MPS: Arkansas Highway History and Architecture MPS
- NRHP reference No.: 03000952
- Added to NRHP: September 27, 2003

The Revel General Store is a historic commercial building at the southwest corner of Arkansas Highway 260 and Woodruff County Road 17 in Revel, Arkansas. It is a small single-story vernacular wood-frame structure, finished in its original weatherboard siding, and sporting a false parapet in front of a gabled roof. Built in 1908, it is the only commercial building in the hamlet, served as its general store until about 1975.

The building was listed on the National Register of Historic Places in 2003.

== See also ==
- National Register of Historic Places listings in Woodruff County, Arkansas
