= Augusta Presbyterian Church =

Historic church in Arkansas, United States

- U.S. National Register of Historic Places
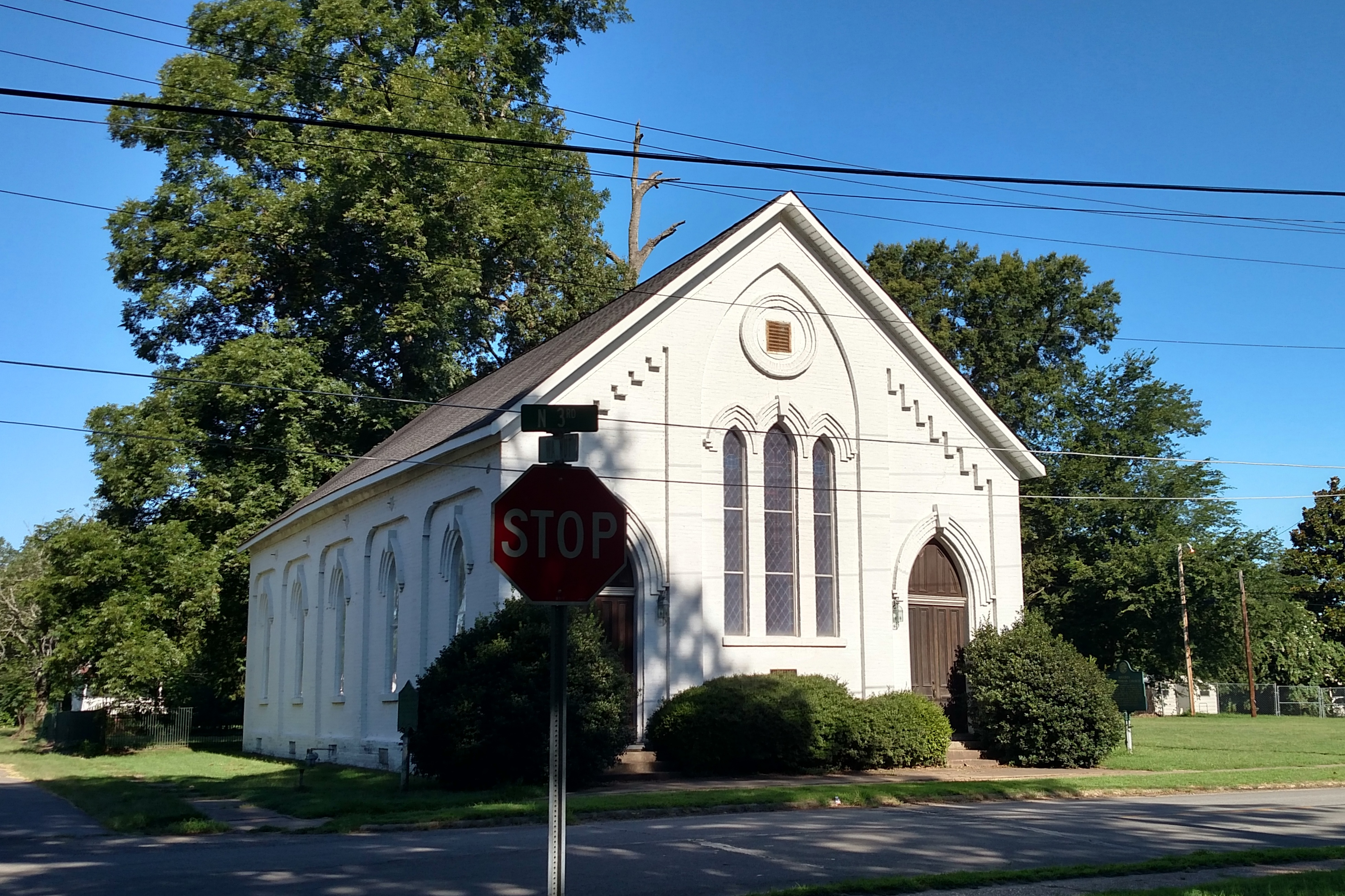

- Location within Arkansas Location within the United States
- Location: Third and Walnut Sts., Augusta, Arkansas
- Coordinates: 35°17′11″N 91°21′57″W
- Area: less than one acre
- Built: 1871
- Built by: Thomas Hough
- NRHP reference No.: 86002873
- Added to NRHP: October 16, 1986

Augusta Presbyterian Church is a historic Presbyterian church building at Third and Walnut Streets in Augusta, Arkansas. It is a large brick building with a gable roof and Gothic Revival styling. The building was fashioned out of bricks made locally by hand, with load-bearing walls that are 2 feet (0.61 m) thick. Built in 1871 for a congregation organized ten years earlier, it is Augusta's oldest church.

The church building was listed on the National Register of Historic Places in 1986.

== See also ==
- National Register of Historic Places listings in Woodruff County, Arkansas
