= Calvin Huey =

First Black football player for Navy

Calvin Huey was the first African-American to play football at the United States Naval Academy, a doctor, coach, teacher, and businessman.

== History ==
Huey was born October 27, 1942, in Sartinville, Mississippi, to Harold Magee and Eartha Lee Huey. Huey was a 1961 graduate of Carver High School in Pascagoula, Mississippi. At Carver, he was team captain, MVP, and all-city, receiving all-city honors as a basketball player as well. Upon graduating, he briefly attended the Tuskegee Institute, then went to Oakland City College, where he was selected as an honorable mention All-American Junior College quarterback. Huey applied to his congressman in Mississippi for an appointment to the Naval Academy, but was refused on the grounds that he would be a "stain on Mississippi". A California representative was willing to nominate him, and he was accepted by the academy as a student, with no mention of his football prowess. When he reached Navy he tried out for the football team. Because there were so many quarterbacks trying out, he decided to try out as a wide receiver instead. He sufficiently impressed coaches Carl Schuette, Lee Corso and Steve Belichick to make the team; he also tried out for and made the basketball team. When Navy played Georgia Tech in 1964, he became the first black player to play at Bobby Dodd Stadium. He also became the first black person to play in an Army–Navy Game. In 1963, as a plebe, wearing number 49, he began the season as an end, before moving to flanker behind Navy's top receiver, Ed Orr. When Orr was injured during the third-from last game of the season, Huey earned the starting position and caught four touchdown passes from quarterback Roger Staubach. In 1967, Huey was one of two African-Americans to graduate from the academy. He was assigned to the USS Perry and served two tours of duty in Vietnam. He earned a PhD in chemistry from the University of Maryland (degree awarded in 1976), and returned to Navy as a professor and assistant football coach in 1973. He then left Navy to work for IBM for fourteen years, before retiring due to kidney failure.

In 2012, the Mississippi Legislature passed a bill titled "Calvin Huey; commend accomplishments and legacy of as Naval Academy academic and football phenomenon", recognizing Doctor Huey for his outstanding achievements in academics and athletics, overcoming the substantial barriers in his path.

In 2017, the city of Pascagoula placed an 18-foot-tall image of Huey, along with Jimmy Buffett, Trent Lott, and Sara Bailey Thomas on Main Street. Huey died from kidney failure on September 1, 2018.
