= Gregory House (Augusta, Arkansas) =

Historic house in Arkansas, United States

- U.S. National Register of Historic Places
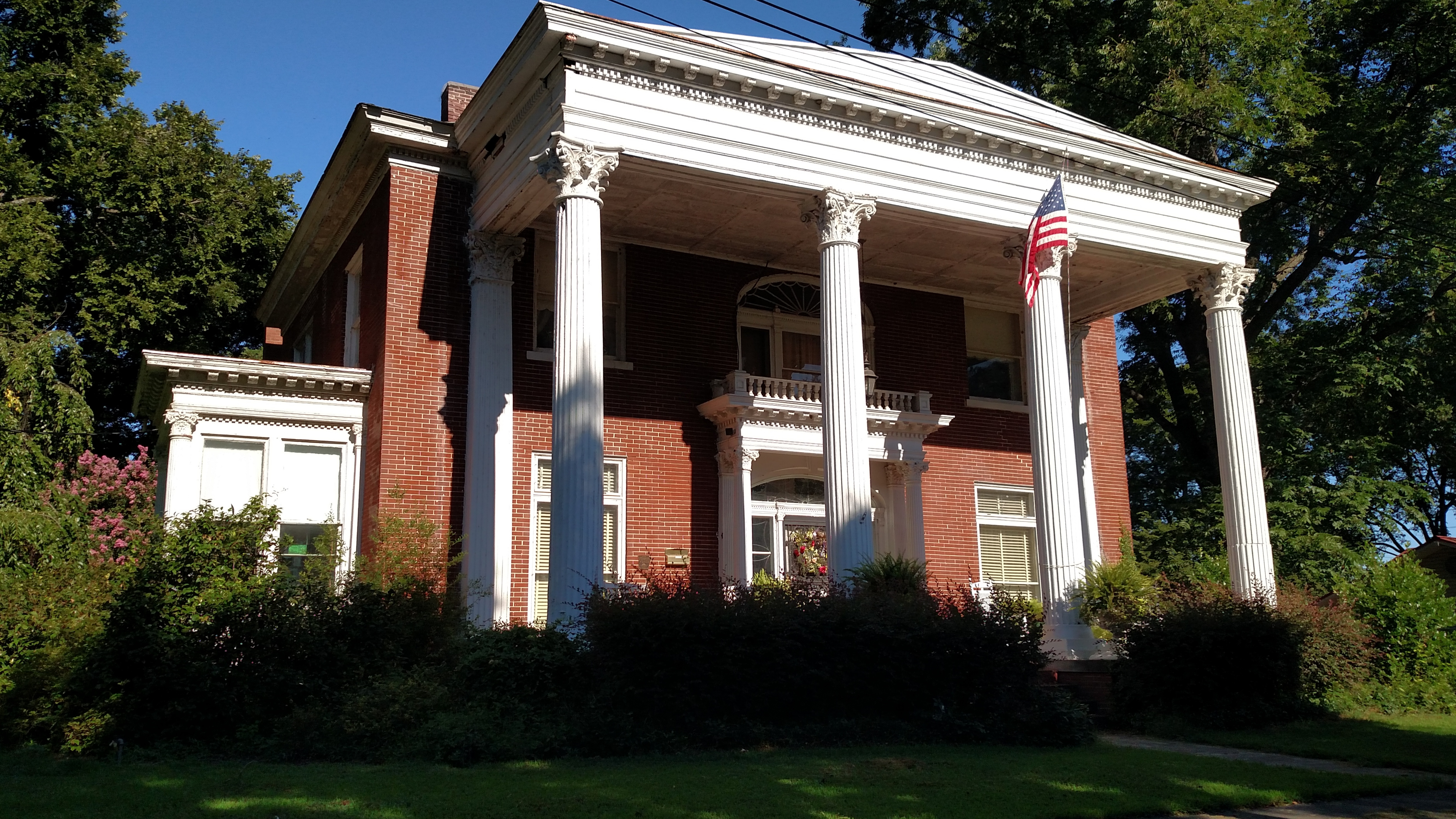

- Location within Arkansas Location within the United States
- Location: 300 S. 2nd St., Augusta, Arkansas
- Coordinates: 35°16′54″N 91°22′0″W
- Area: less than one acre
- Built: 1900
- Architect: Frank W. Gibb
- Architectural style: Colonial Revival
- NRHP reference No.: 12000858
- Added to NRHP: October 17, 2012

The Gregory House is a historic house at 300 South Second Street in Augusta, Arkansas. It is an elegant two-story brick Colonial Revival structure, with a two-story front portico supported by fluted Corinthian columns. The main entrance is set within this under a single-story portico supported by round columns and square pilasters, with a balcony railing above. The house was designed by Little Rock architect Frank W. Gibb and built in 1900 for Minor Gregory, president of the Woodruff County Bank and the Augusta Railroad.

The house was listed on the National Register of Historic Places in 2012.

== See also ==
- National Register of Historic Places listings in Woodruff County, Arkansas
