= Augusta Commercial Historic District =

Historic district in Arkansas, United States

- U.S. National Register of Historic Places
- U.S. Historic district
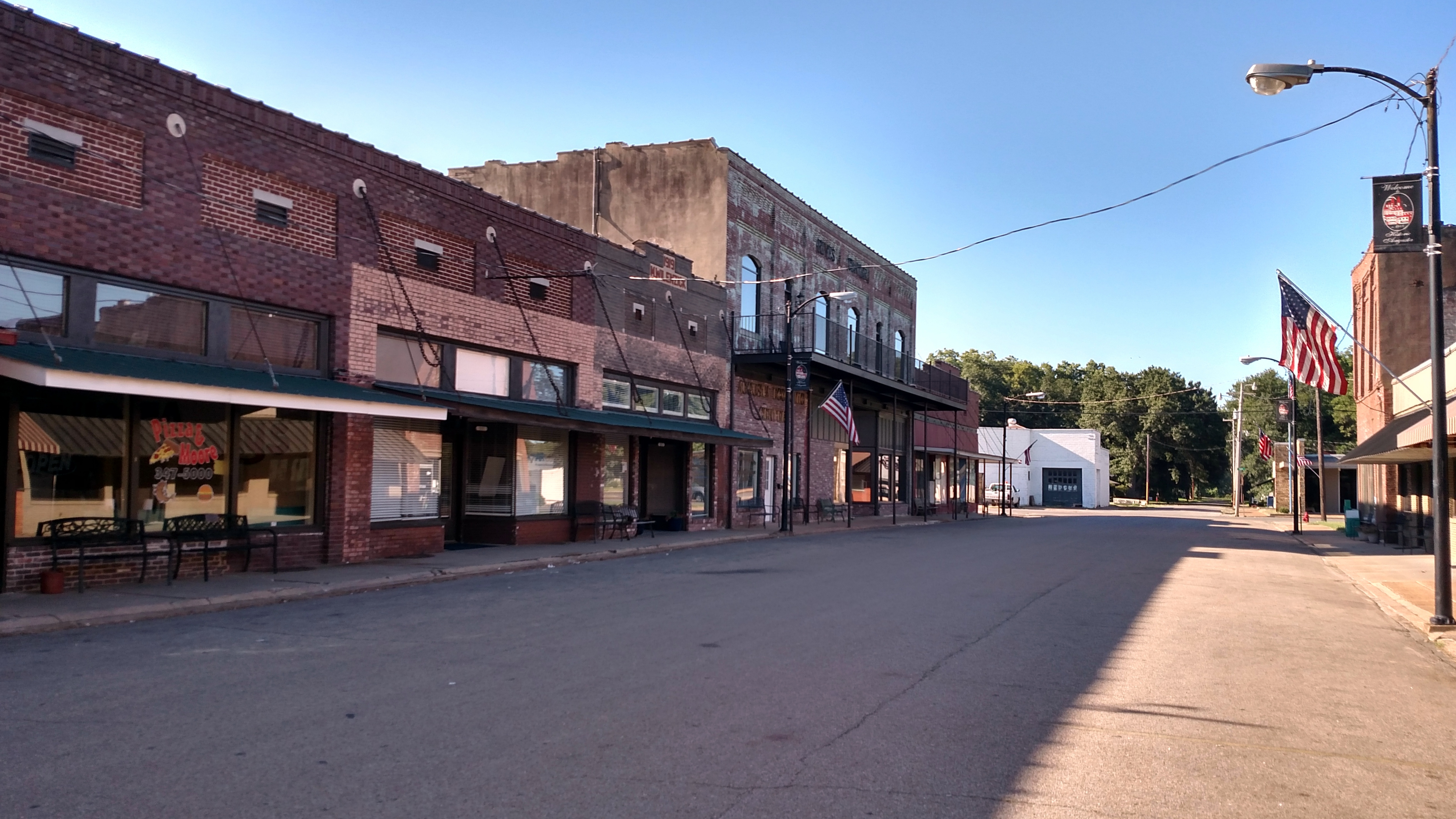

- Location within Arkansas Location within the United States
- Location: Roughly bounded by 1st, Locust, Main, 2nd, and Pearl Sts., Augusta, Arkansas
- Coordinates: 35°17′4″N 91°22′4″W
- Area: 12.2 acres (4.9 ha)
- Built: 1897
- Architectural style: Italianate, Early Commercial, Tapestry brick
- NRHP reference No.: 08000817
- Added to NRHP: August 27, 2008

The Augusta Commercial Historic District encompasses the historic commercial center of the city of Augusta, Arkansas. Located on the eastern bank of the White River, Augusta developed in the late 19th and early 20th centuries as a major crossing point of the river in eastern Arkansas. Located between the river and Second Street, and between Pearl and Mulberry Streets are a collection of 44 historic buildings, including warehouses along the waterfront and commercial and retail buildings on the adjacent streets.

The district was listed on the National Register of Historic Places in 2008.

== See also ==
- National Register of Historic Places listings in Woodruff County, Arkansas
