= Woodruff County Airport =

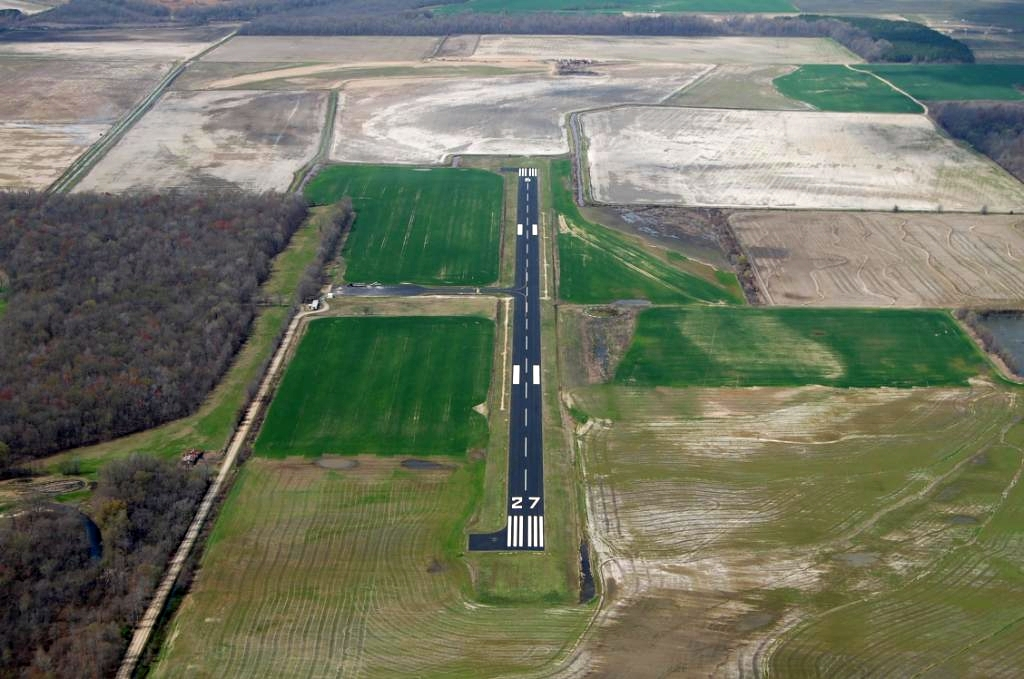
- IATA: none; ICAO: none; FAA LID: M60

Summary
- Airport type: Public
- Owner: Woodruff County
- Serves: Woodruff County
- Location: Augusta, Arkansas
- Elevation AMSL: 200 ft / 61 m
- Coordinates: 35°16′19″N 091°16′11″W
- Interactive map of Woodruff County Airport

Runways
Direction	Length		Surface
Direction	ft	m	Surface
9/27	3,797	1,157	Asphalt

Statistics (2023)
- Aircraft operations (year ending 2/28/2023): 5,500
- Source: Federal Aviation Administration

Woodruff County Airport (FAA LID: M60) is a county-owned public-use airport in Woodruff County, Arkansas, United States. It is located four nautical miles (5 mi, 7 km) east of the central business district of Augusta, Arkansas.

This airport is included in the FAA's National Plan of Integrated Airport Systems for 2011–2015, which categorized it as a general aviation airport.

== Facilities and aircraft ==
Woodruff County Airport covers an area of 100 acres (40 ha) at an elevation of 200 feet (61 m) above mean sea level. It has one runway designated 9/27 with an asphalt surface measuring 3,797 by 75 feet (1,157 x 23 m). For the 12-month period ending February 28, 2023, the airport had 5,500 general aviation aircraft operations, an average of 105 per week.

== See also ==
- List of airports in Arkansas
