= Jess Norman Post 166 American Legion Hut =

- U.S. National Register of Historic Places
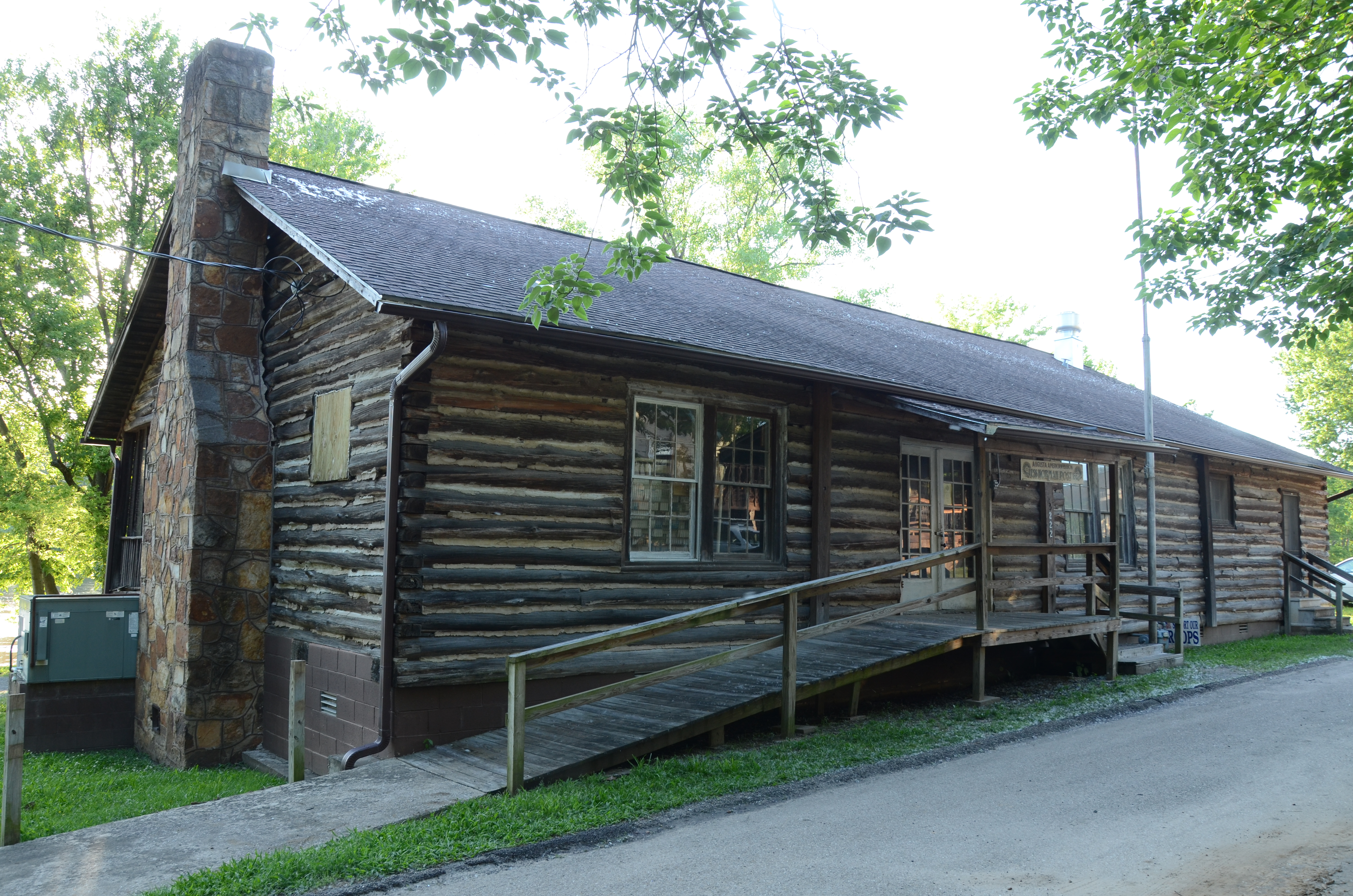

- Location within Arkansas Location within the United States
- Location: 222 S. First St., Augusta, Arkansas
- Coordinates: 35°16′54″N 91°22′4″W
- Area: less than one acre
- Built by: Civil Works Administration
- Architectural style: square-notched
- NRHP reference No.: 01001100
- Added to NRHP: October 14, 2001

The Jess Norman Post 166 American Legion Hut is a historic clubhouse at 222 South First Street in Augusta, Arkansas. It is a single-story rectangular log structure, with a gable roof and a stone chimney. It is fashioned out of cypress logs joined by square notches, and rests on piers of stone and wood. It was built in 1934 with funding from the Civil Works Administration for the local American Legion chapter, and is architecturally unique in the city. It is still used for its original purpose.

The building was listed on the National Register of Historic Places in 2001.

== See also ==
- National Register of Historic Places listings in Woodruff County, Arkansas
