= Woodruff County Courthouse =

- U.S. National Register of Historic Places
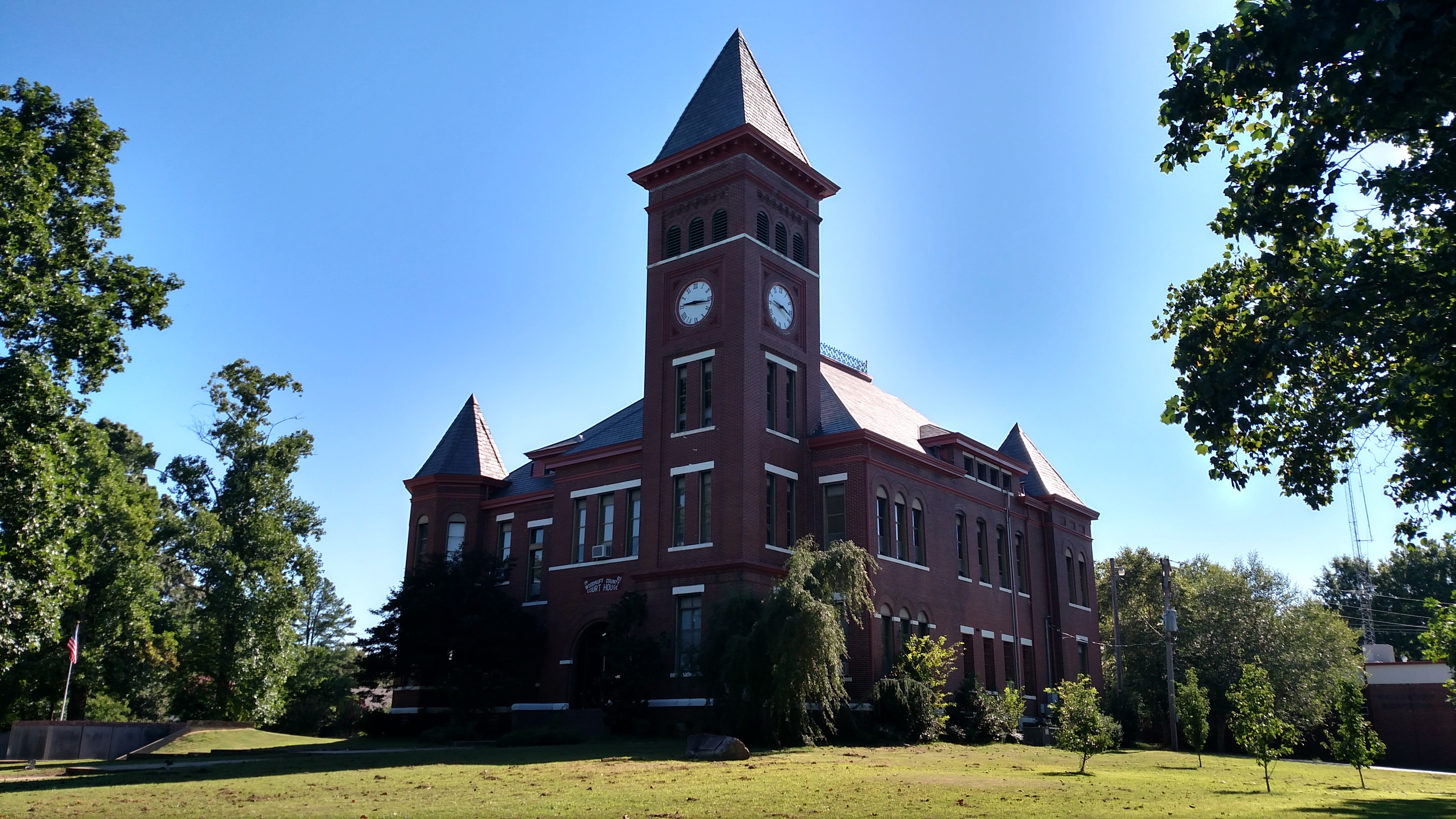

- Location within Arkansas Location within the United States
- Location: 500 N. 3rd St., Augusta, Arkansas
- Coordinates: 35°17′15″N 91°21′52″W
- Area: less than one acre
- Built: 1900
- Architect: Charles L. Thompson
- Architectural style: Romanesque, Richardsonian Romanesque
- MPS: Thompson, Charles L., Design Collection TR
- NRHP reference No.: 82000959
- Added to NRHP: December 22, 1982

The Woodruff County Courthouse is a historic courthouse at 500 North 3rd Street in Augusta, the county seat of Woodruff County, Arkansas. It is a monumental brick Romanesque Revival building, designed by the noted Arkansas architect Charles L. Thompson and built in 1902. It is roughly rectangular with a hip roof, but has projecting sections as well as a five-stage tower, capped by a pyramidal roof. Its main entrance is to the left of the tower, recessed in a round-arch opening.

The building was listed on the National Register of Historic Places in 1982.

== Gallery ==
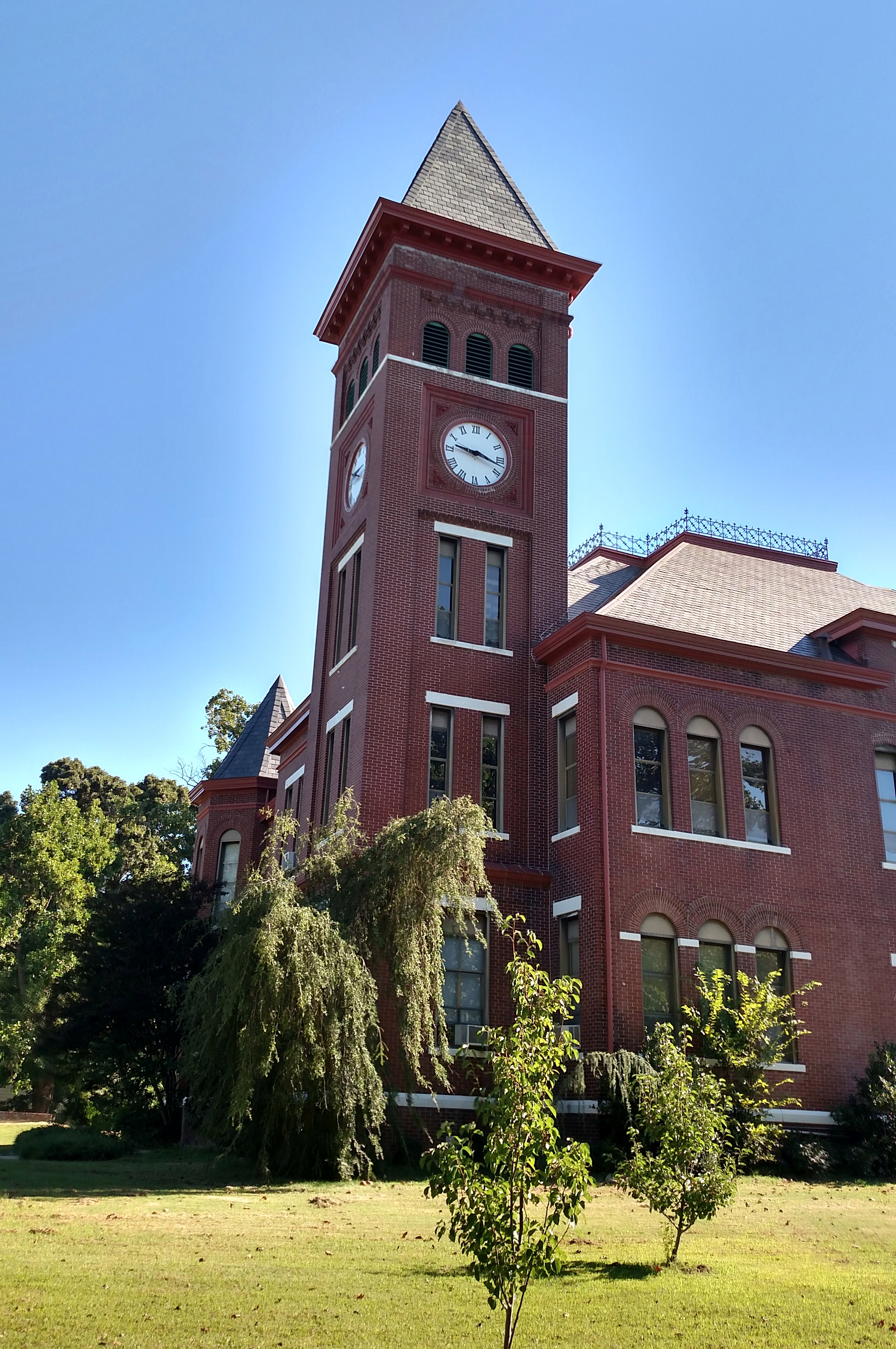
Clock tower view

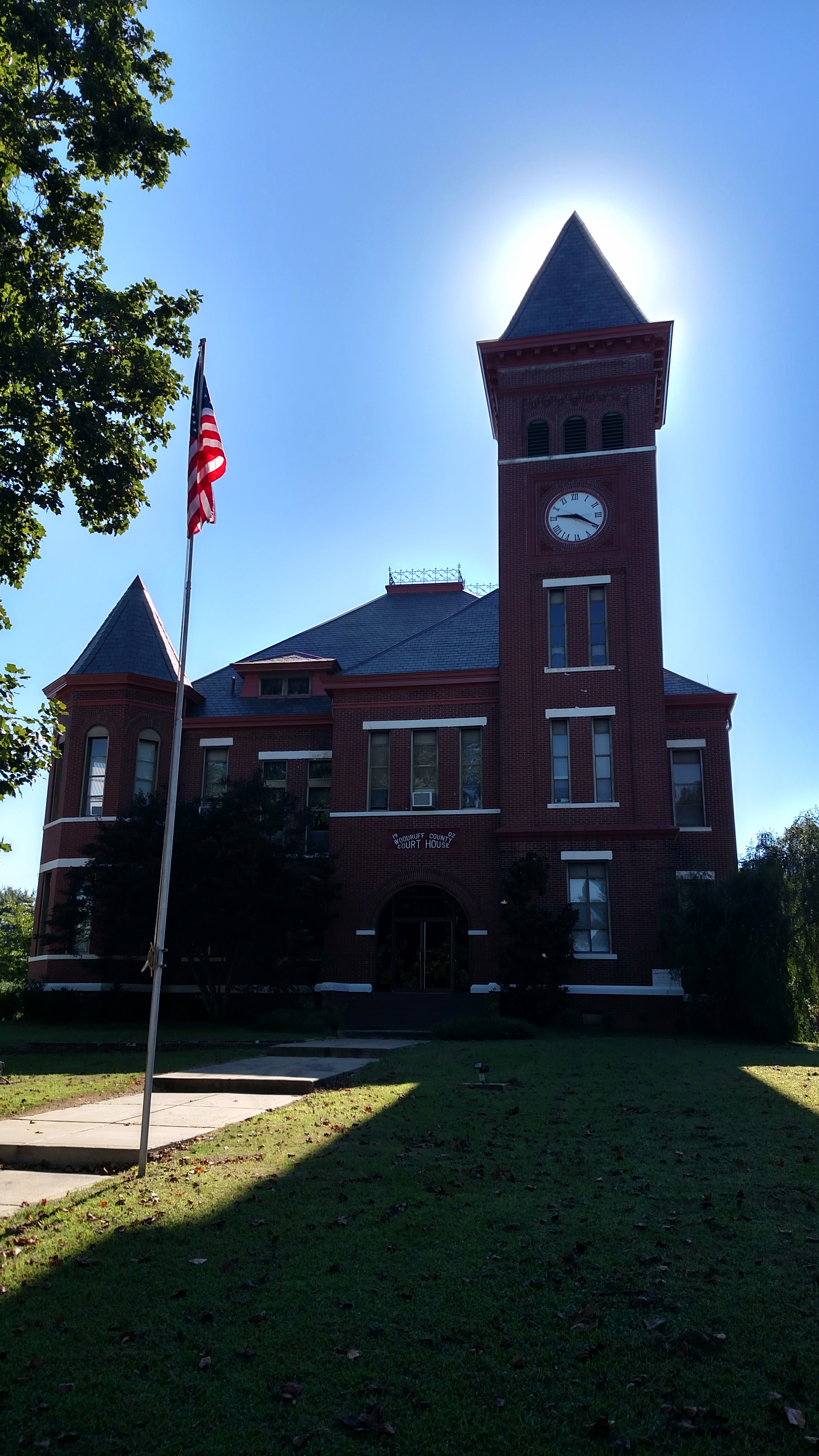
Front view

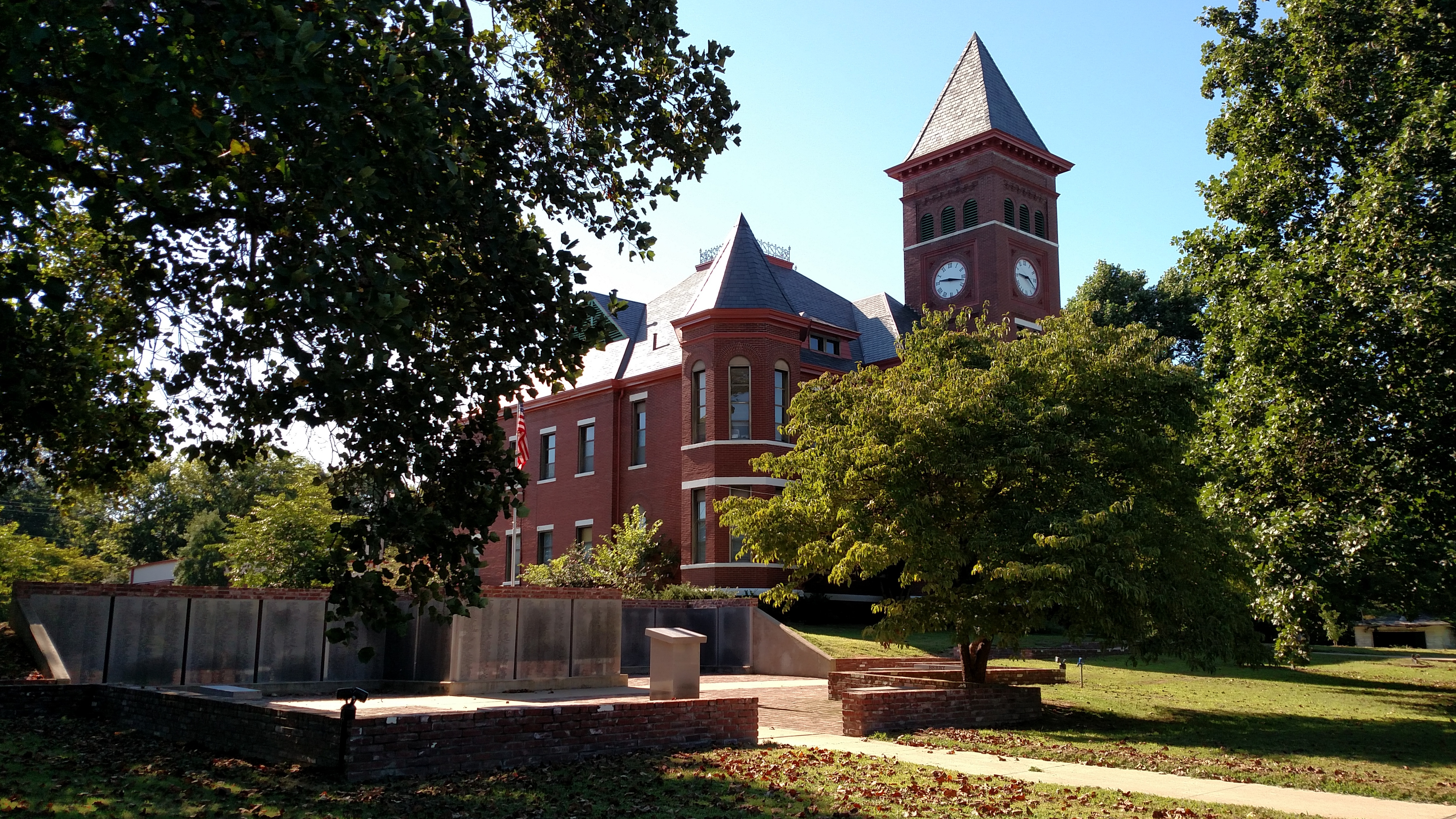
War memorial in front yard

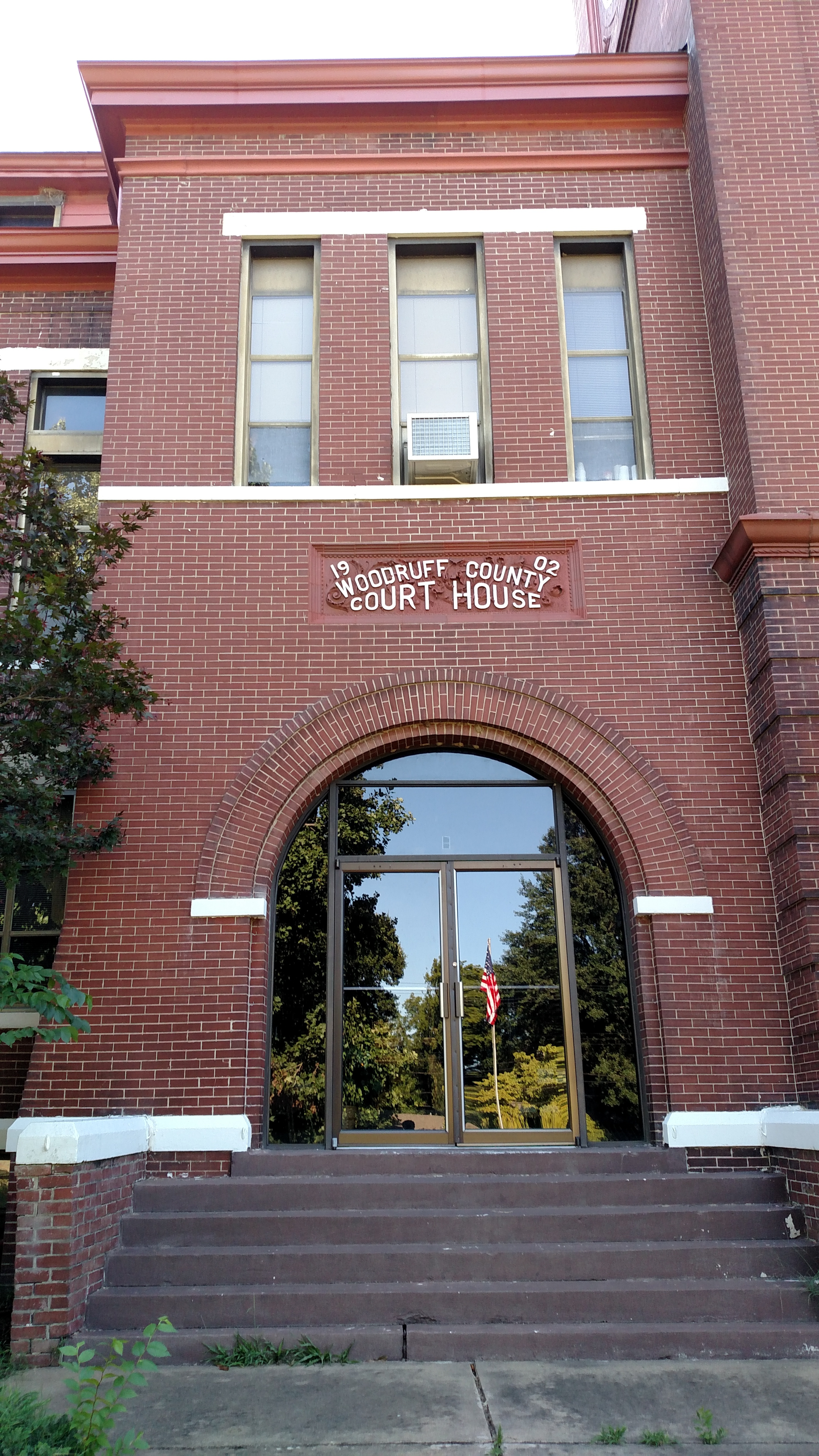
Main entrance

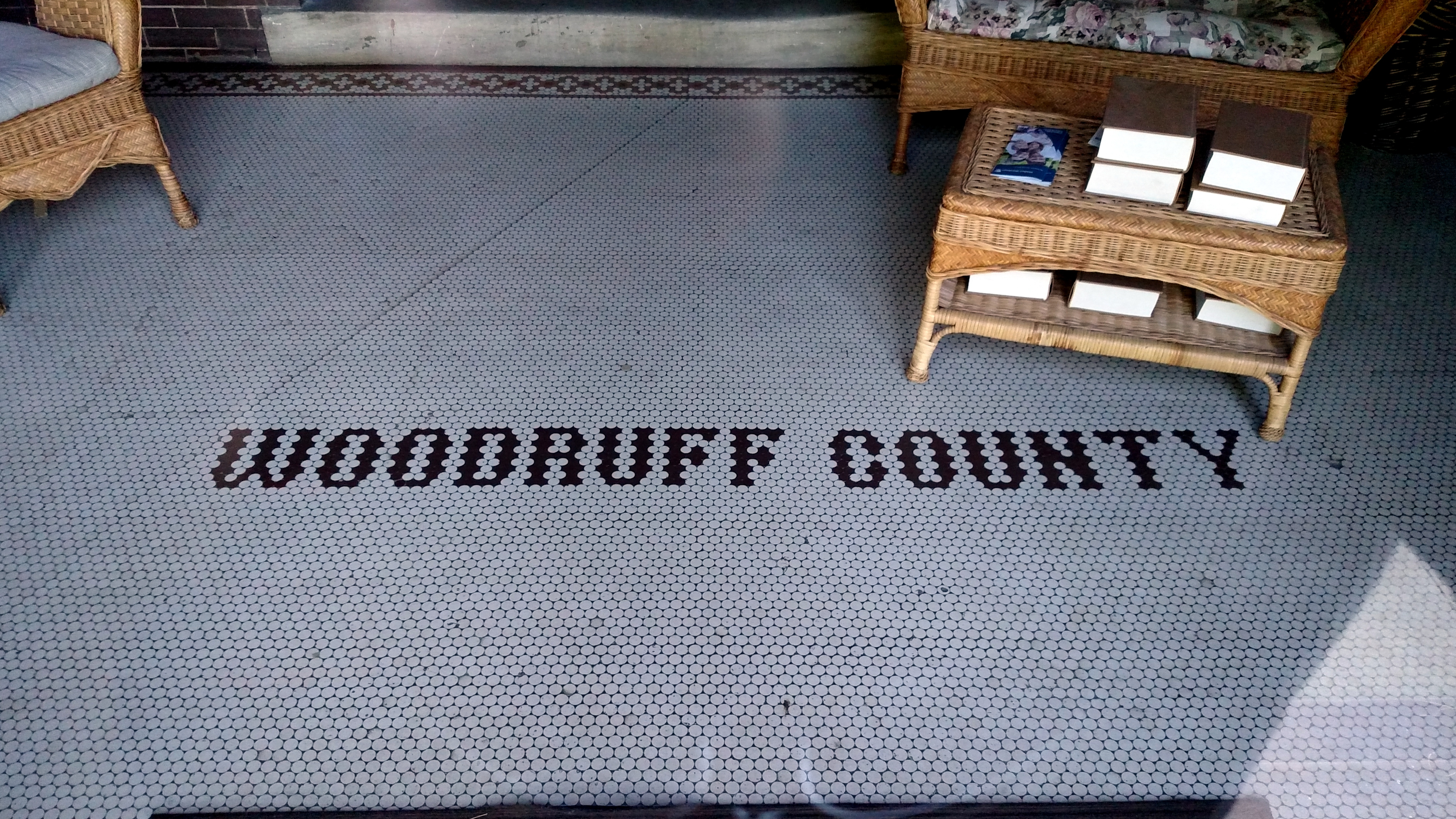
Floor in entryway

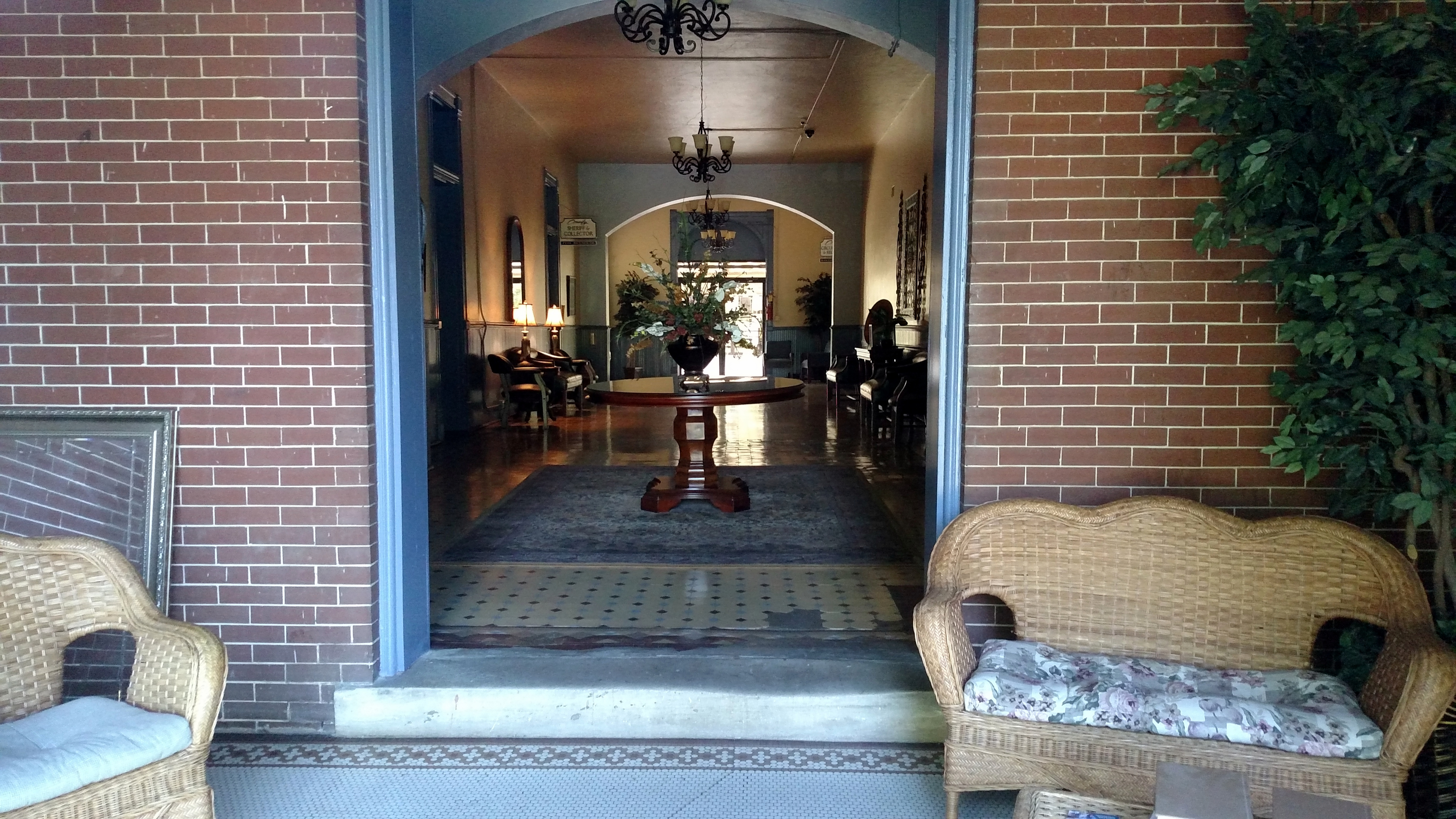
Interior from front door

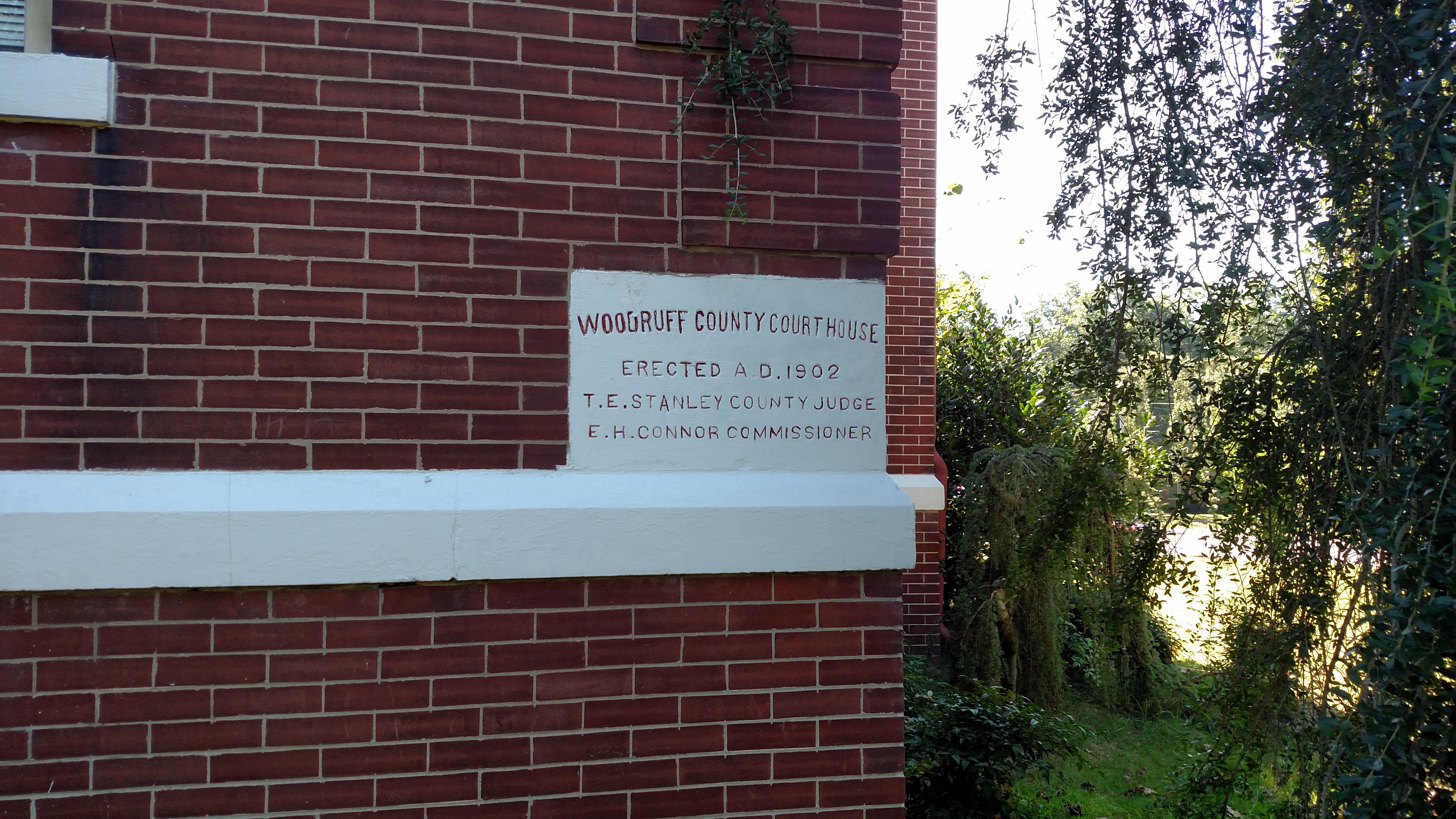
Cornerstone

== See also ==
- National Register of Historic Places listings in Woodruff County, Arkansas
