= George Washington Carver High School (Kinder, Louisiana) =

Location
- Kinder, Louisiana; United States
- Coordinates: 30.48137°N 92.86177°W

Information
- School type: Public
- Closed: 1970
- Gender: Co-Ed
- Nickname: Bulldogs

George Washington Carver High School was a public high school located in Kinder, Louisiana in Allen Parish, Louisiana. It served black students until the public school system was integrated.

== History ==
Until 1950, black children in Kinder attended school in Oakdale. In 1962, 15 of 30 graduates attended college. Most of these went to Grambling State University or McNeese State University. Since there was no employment for black college graduates in Kinder, the majority of the graduates find teaching positions in larger cities. The school closed in 1970 when the public schools integrated.
