= George Washington Carver High School (Bunnell, Florida) =

Segregated public school in Bunnell, FL

Coordinates: 29.4635°N 81.2524°W

- 301 SW 14th Ave; Bunnell, Florida; U.S.

Information
- Type: Public
- Founded: 1949
- Closed: 1967
- Athletics conference: FIAA
- Nickname: Tigers

George Washington Carver High School was built in 1949 on 12 acres of land along Drain Street in Bunnell, Flagler County, Florida. It was a racially segregated public black-only high school during the Jim Crow era, and was in operation from 1949 to 1967.

== History ==
The segregated black "Negro" public schools in Flagler County, Florida, prior to 1949, only went through the eighth grade. Although Flagler County provided the racially segregated white-only Bunnell High School, which was in operation from the founding of the county in 1917, blacks were forbidden to attend. Flagler County did not provide a high school for blacks for 32 years (from its founding in 1917 until 1949 when the George Washington Carver High School was built).

George Washington Carver High School closed after the 1967 school year (13 years after the Brown v. Board of Education of Topeka decision). Black high school students were integrated with white students at Bunnell High School, which was formally a white-only school. From the 1968 through the 1970 school year Bunnell High School served as the only high school in Flagler County. During the summer of 1970, a fire damaged the Bunnell High School building, which forced its closure. The George Washington Carver High School (building) re-opened for the 1971 school year and all of Flagler County’s high school students, black and white, attended school here until the end of the 1974 school year. However, the George Washington Carver High School’s name was changed to Bunnell High School from 1971 through 1974. In 1974, the Flagler Palm Coast High School was completed and the George Washington Carver High School building (now named Bunnell High School) was closed, and would not open as a high school ever again.

Although the rest of the school buildings have been torn down, the gym remains and is known as the Carver Center. Efforts by the county commission to tear the gym down in 2010 resulted in backlash from the community as well as the school board, and it was instead refurbished and ownership returned to the school system.

The George Washington Community Center facility [which is now housed in the former George Washington Carver School gymnasium building] and is owned by Flagler County. The George Washington Carver Foundation, which is a non-profit 501(c)(3) organization works to raise money and grant funding to support the facility. The George Washington Community Center facility offers community training (including a GED program), recreation and athletics with scheduled open gym hours available for the public.

=== George Washington Carver Center - Exterior Picture Gallery ===
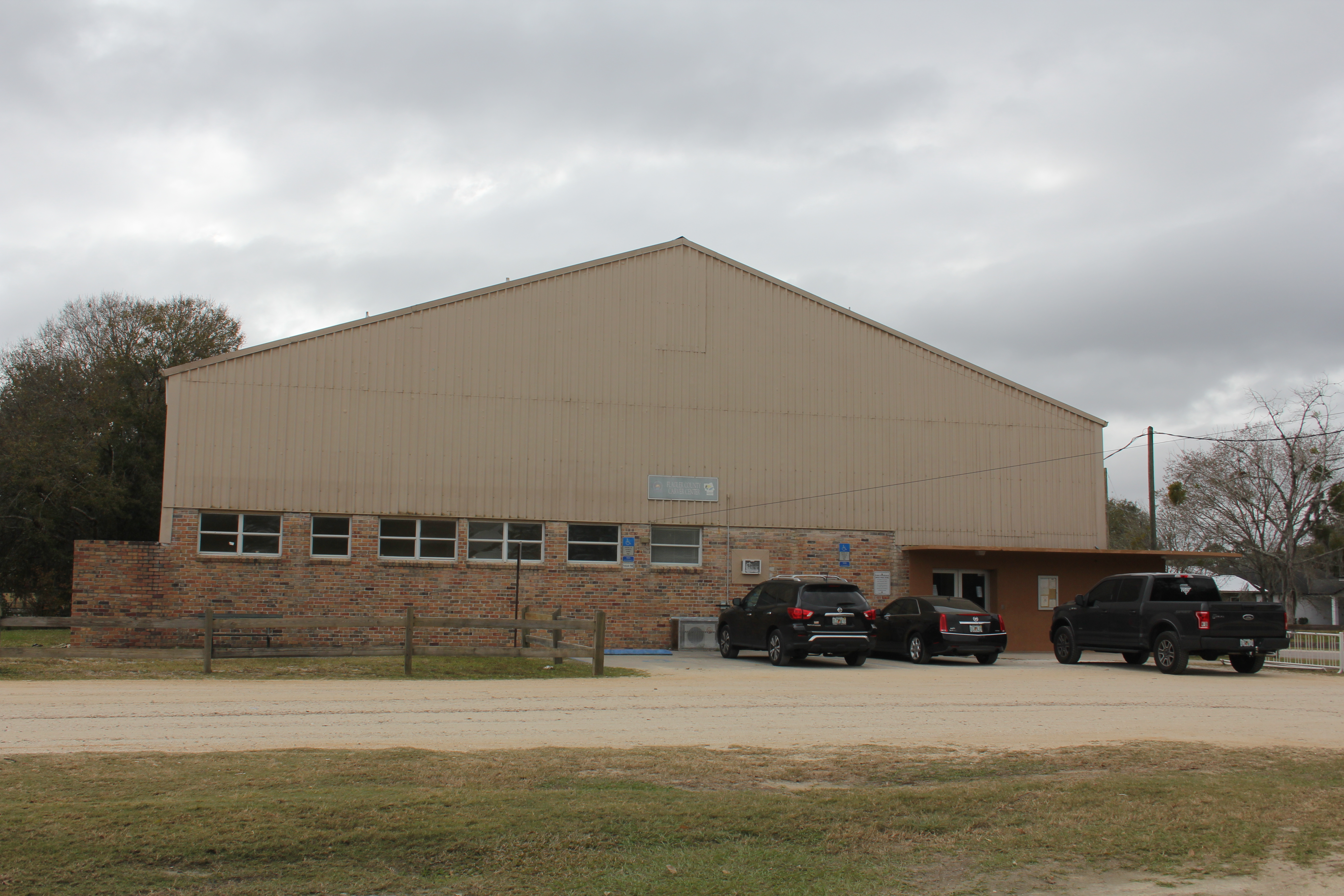
G.W. Carver Center - West Exterior View

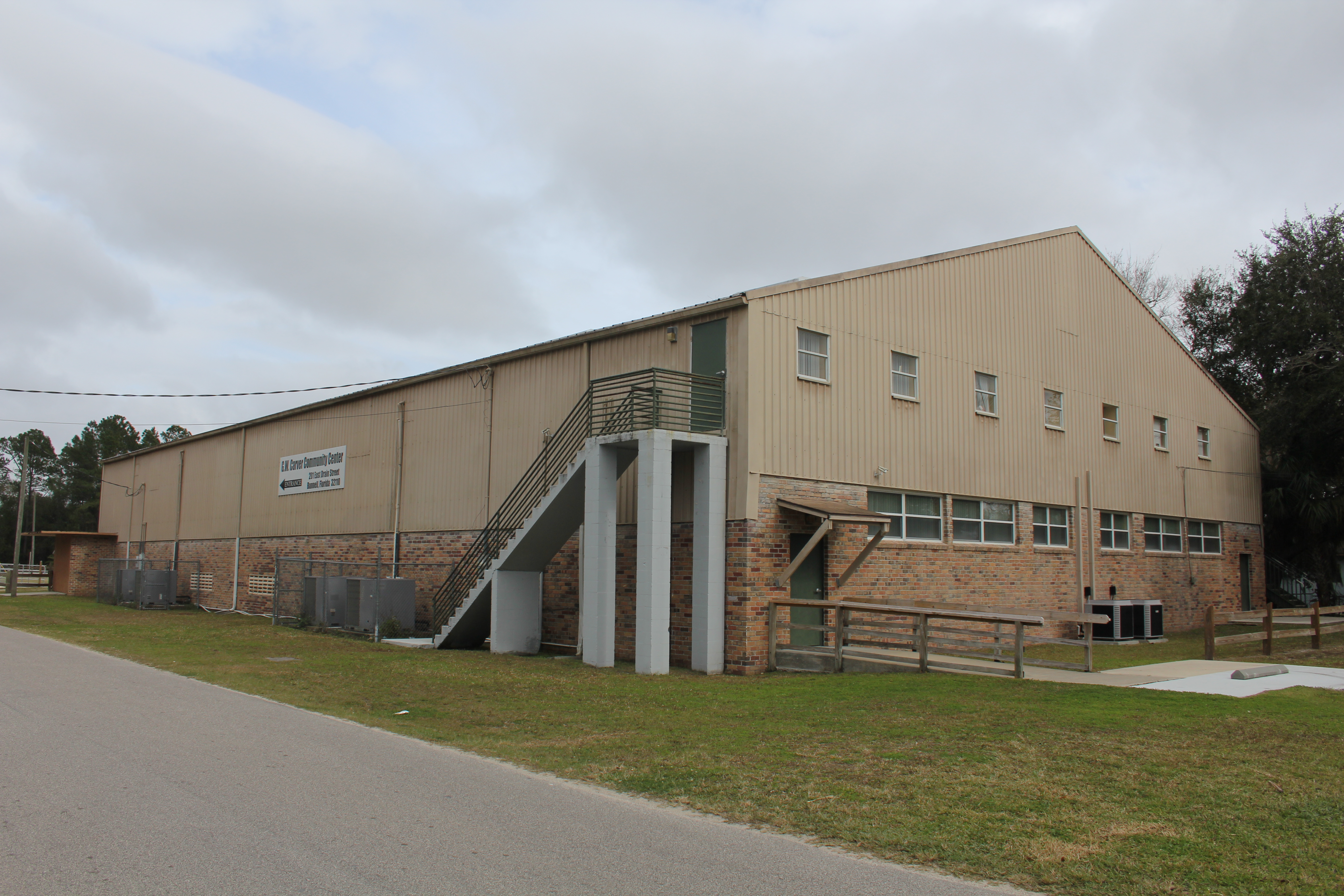
G.W. Carver Center - SW Exterior View

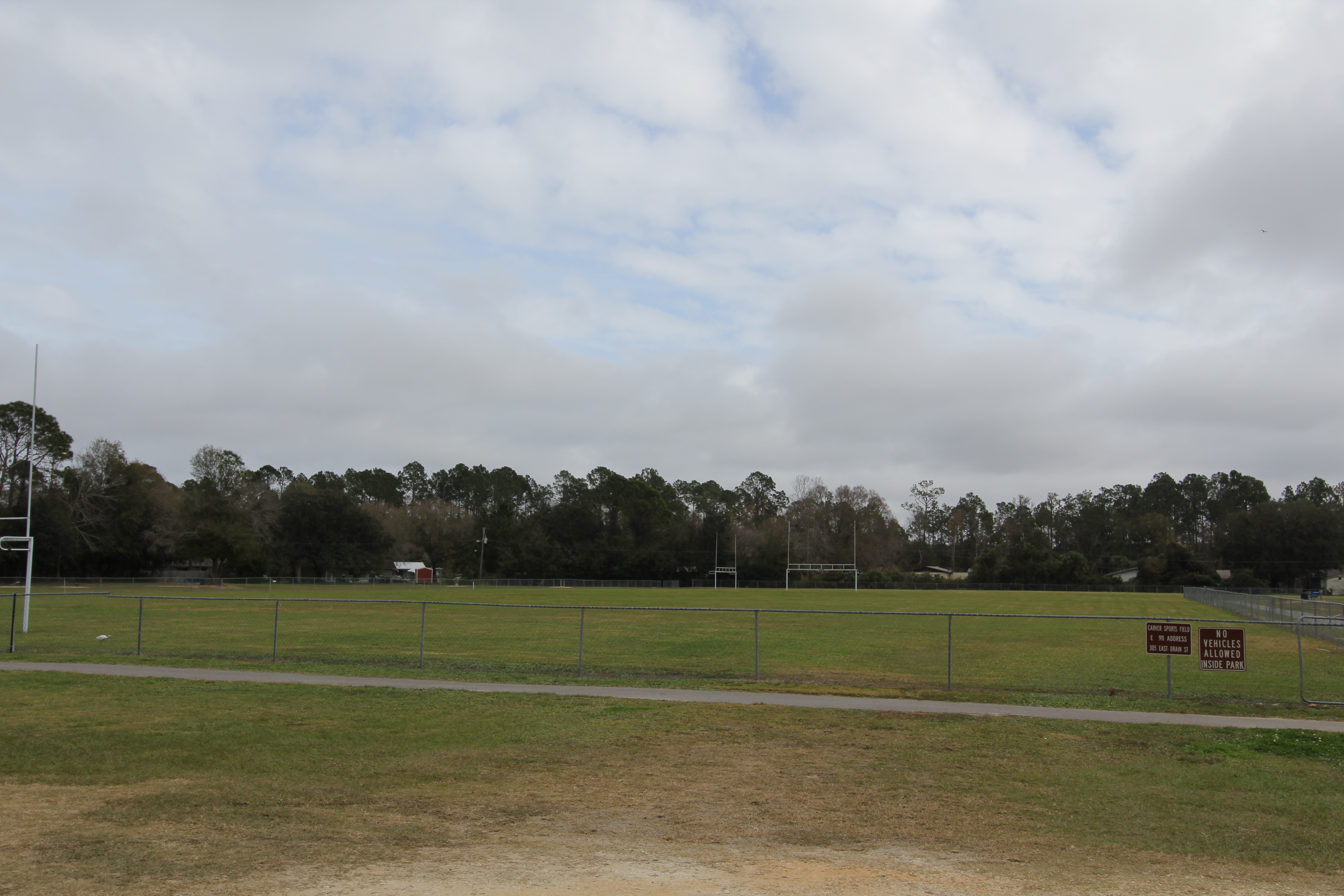
G.W. Carver Center - Sports Field View looking south

=== George Washington Carver Center - Interior Picture Gallery ===
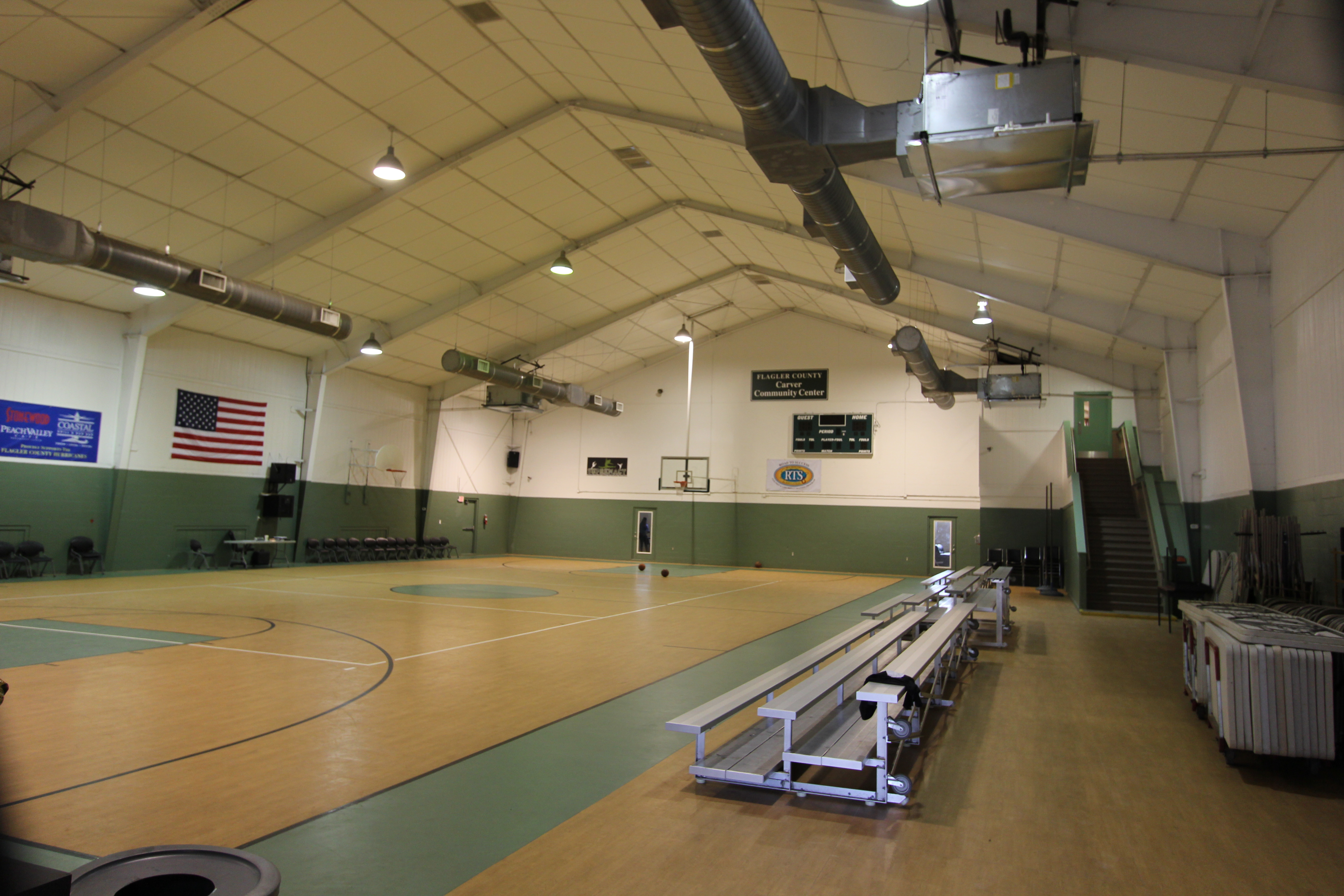
G.W. Carver Center - Interior Gym View

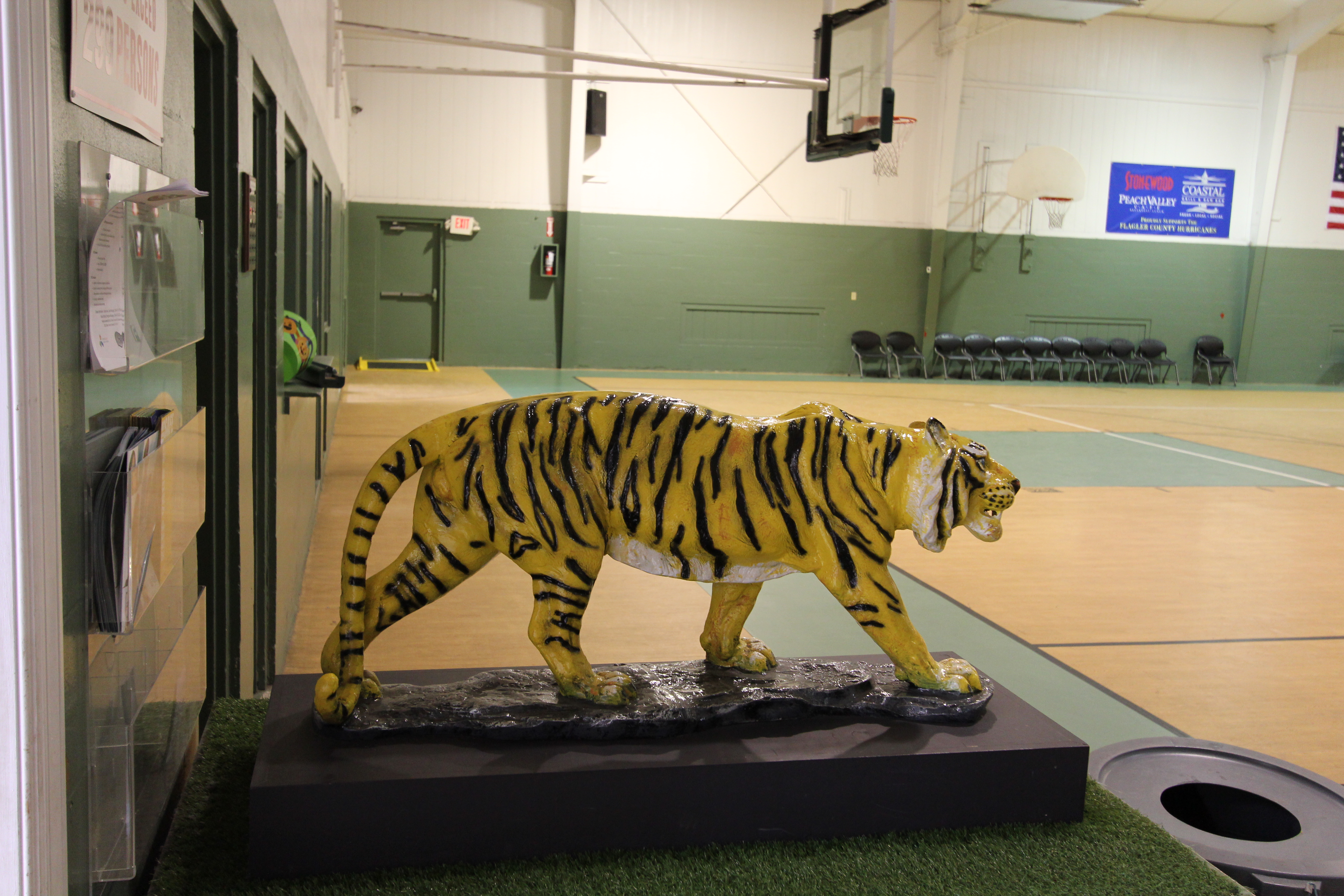
G.W. Carver Center - Interior Tiger View

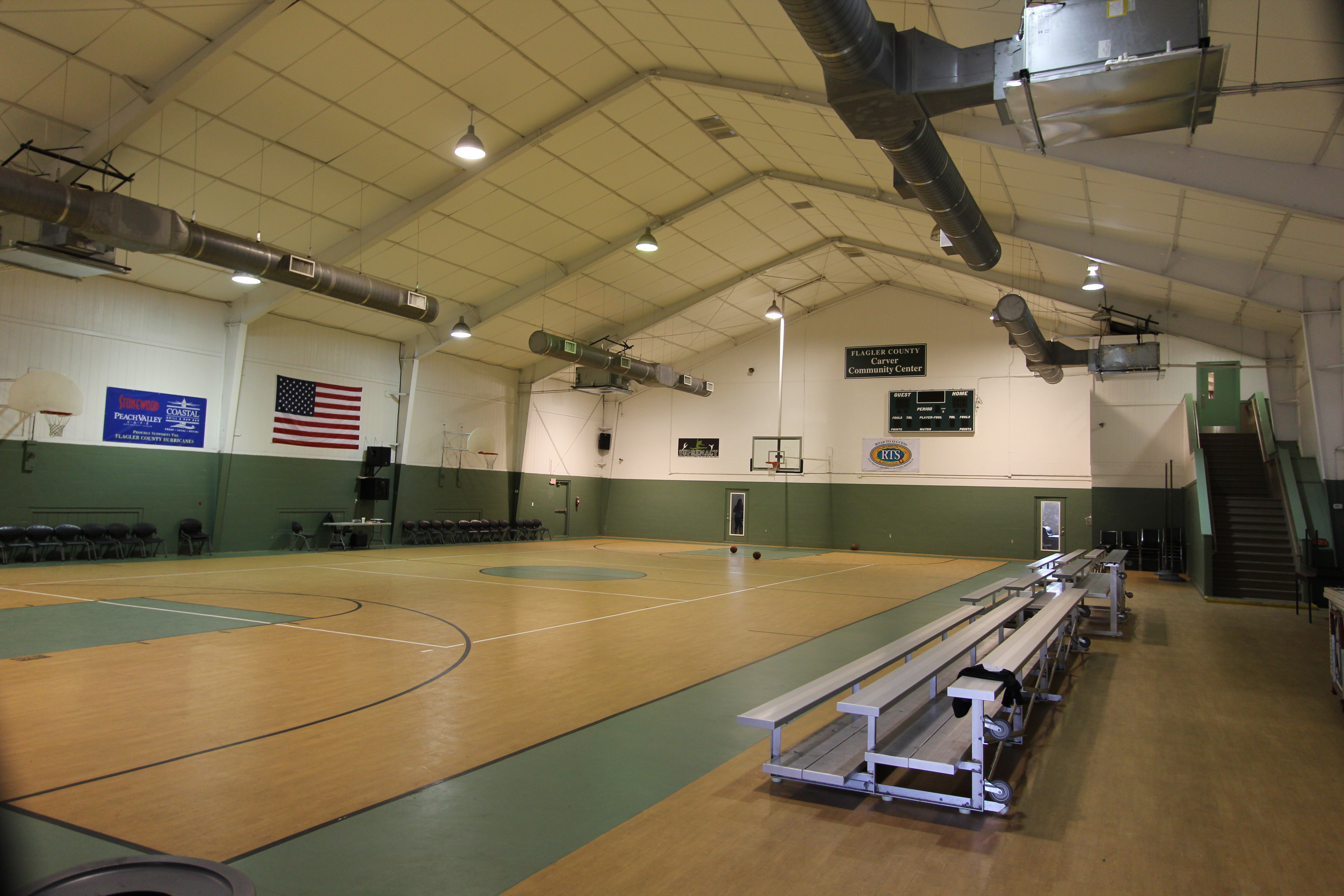
G.W. Carver Center - Interior Gym Broader View
