= Carver-Price High School =

Location
- 102 Carver Lane; Appomattox, Virginia; U.S.
- Coordinates: 37.3606794°N 78.8309909°W

Information
- Former name: Appomattox Training School; George Washington Carver High School
- Type: Public
- Opened: 1919
- Status: closed
- Closed: 1970
- Campus size: 27 acres
- Nickname: Panthers

Carver-Price High School was a public secondary school in Appomattox, Virginia. It served as the high school for black students from 1919 until 1970 when the schools were integrated. From 1954 to 1966 the school educated black students from surrounding counties which closed their schools in 1954 to avoid having blacks and white attend the same schools.

== History ==
In 1919, the Appomattox Training School for colored children was begun in the First Baptist Church of Appomattox, with funds partially provided by the Rosenwald foundation. As the enrollment grew, the school moved to a 27-acre site, with a building and three teachers who taught elementary through high school. In 1930, a new building was added. In 1934 the school was renamed George Washington Carver High School. In 1951, there was a significant expansion, with the addition of a gym, a cafeteria, and a dozen new classrooms. In 1952 the school was renamed Carver-Price High School after educator Mrs. Mozella Price, who taught there from 1919 until 1963.

In 1954, the federal courts mandated that schools be integrated. Prince Edward County refused to cooperate, instead closing the public schools in an act known as massive resistance. The schools remained closed until 1964, and the number of students at Carver-Price swelled to over 50 per classroom, and many students from surrounding areas roomed in the home of Mozella Price in order to attend. Some students came from as far as 140 miles away. In 1964 an 11 room building was added. In February 1970, the schools were finally integrated, and Carver-Price was repurposed for grades 5-9, and was known as Appomattox Intermediate School.

The school was abandoned in 2002, until 2008, the original four buildings have housed the Carver-Price Legacy Museum, funded by the Carver-Price Alumni Association.

== Notable people ==
Larry Robinson (American football), running back for Dallas Cowboys and the first black football and basketball player at the University of Tennessee
