= George Washington Carver High School Home Economics Building =

- U.S. National Register of Historic Places
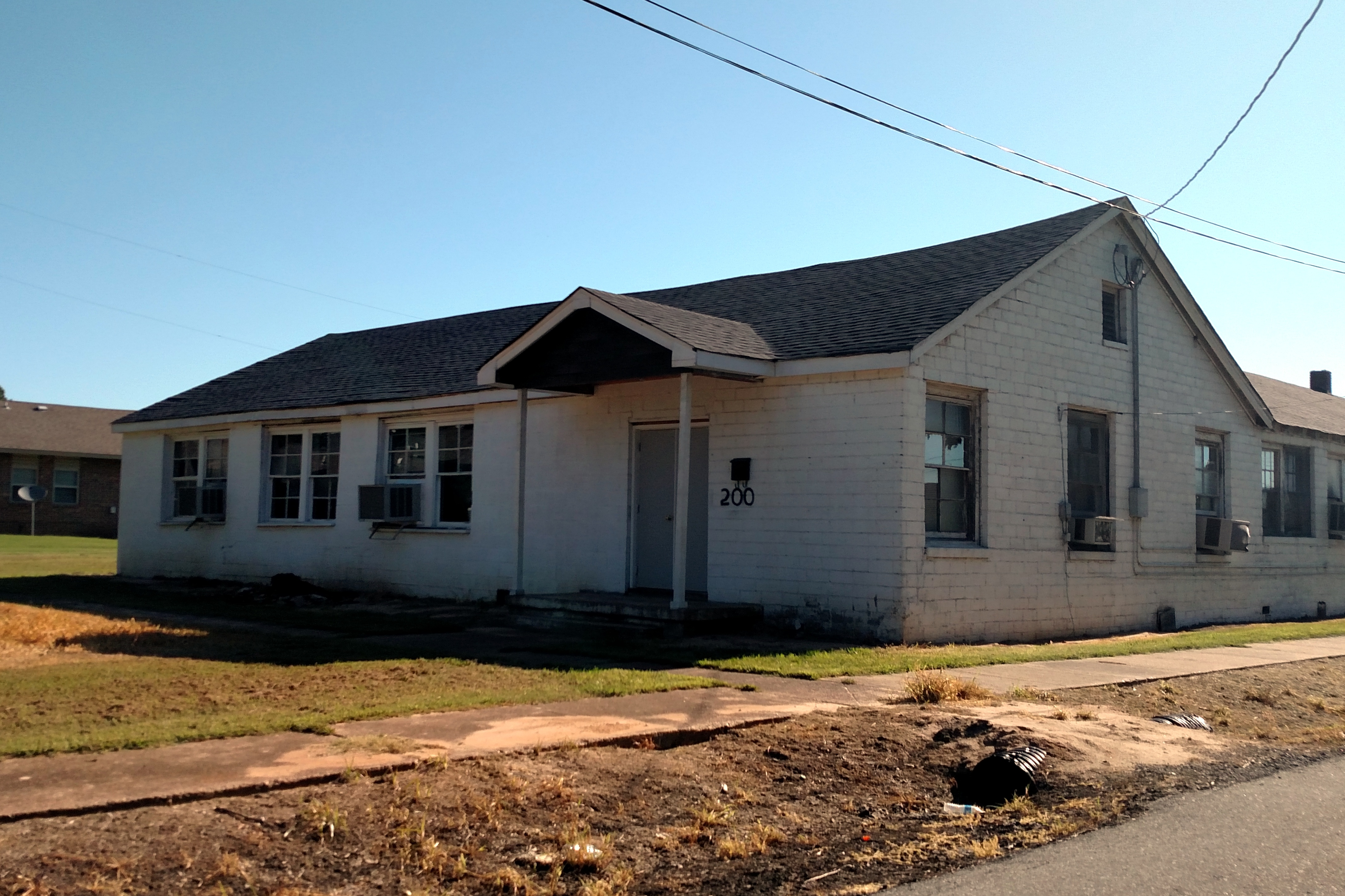

- Location within Arkansas Location within the United States
- Location: 900 Pearl St., Augusta, Arkansas
- Coordinates: 35°17′10″N 91°21′26″W
- Area: less than one acre
- Built: 1944
- Architectural style: minimal traditional
- NRHP reference No.: 03001381
- Added to NRHP: January 15, 2004

The George Washington Carver High School Home Economics Building is a historic school building at 900 Pearl Street (between 9th and 10th Streets) in Augusta, Arkansas. It is a single-story L-shaped concrete block structure with a gable roof and modest vernacular styling. Built in 1944 with funding by local subscription, it is the only one of five buildings built between 1917 and 1948 for the education of Augusta's African-American population. The school remained segregated until integration took place in 1970, and has been used since then to house the local Head Start Program.

The building was listed on the National Register of Historic Places in 2004.

== See also ==
- National Register of Historic Places listings in Woodruff County, Arkansas
