= Ellerbe Road School =

George Washington Carver School

Location
- Ellerbe Road; Shreveport, Louisiana; United States
- Coordinates: 32.295157°N 93.596288°W

Information
- Established: 1957
- Status: Closed
- Closed: 1973
- School district: Caddo Parish Public Schools

Ellerbe Road School, sometimes nicknamed Satan School, is a defunct campus on Ellerbe Road in Caddo Parish, Louisiana, United States. It is alleged to be haunted. The building has been demolished.

== History ==
George Washington Carver High School opened in 1957. The school consistently struggled with a low population base from which to draw students, more so after desegregation, and the school closed in 1973.

In 1981, Baptist Tabernacle leased the property for use as a campus of Baptist Christian College. The site closed in 1985. The buildings have been unoccupied since that time.

== Campus ==
The campus remains the property of Caddo Parish School Board. The site has been leased for agricultural use (specifically livestock grazing) since at least 1996.

In 2011, The Caddo Parish School Board in a 9–2 vote, with one abstained, approved Vision 20/20, a master facilities plan which will ultimately call for the demolition of the Carver Campus, along with two other abandoned Rodessa schools (Rodessa High and Pine Valley) that closed in 1976.
