= George Washington Carver High School (Chesterfield, Virginia) =

Location
- Chesterfield, Virginia; U.S.
- Coordinates: 37.3606794°N 78.8309909°W

Information
- Type: Public
- Status: closed

George Washington Carver High School was a segregated, black-only public secondary school in Chesterfield, Virginia. When the federal courts mandated the schools be integrated in 1970, Carver was closed.

== History ==
In September 1948, D. Webster Davis and Hickory Hill high schools were merged to form George Washington Carver High School with a student body of 348. Hickory Hill, founded in 1915, had been the county's first African-American high school, was at the far north of the county, while D. Webster Davis was at the far south end. Carver provided a centralized location, and became the only high school for black children in the county. Carver's first graduating class was in 1949. Books were provided when they were discarded by white schools. Carver closed in 1970 when the county integrated the public schools under federal court order.

The buildings are now used as Chesterfield Community High School.
