= Augusta, Arkansas =

City in Arkansas, United States

- City
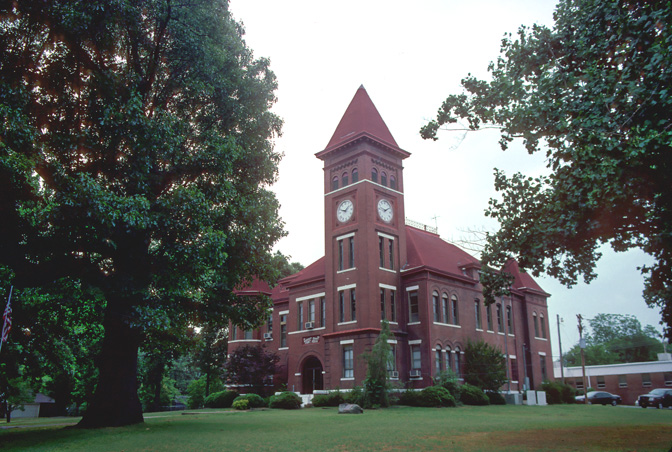
- Woodruff County Courthouse in Augusta

- Location in Woodruff County and Arkansas

- Location in the United States
- Coordinates: 35°17′19″N 91°22′09″W
- Country: United States
- State: Arkansas
- County: Woodruff
- Founded: February 21, 1848
- Incorporated: July 9, 1860
- Founded by: Thomas Hough
- Named after: Augusta Cald

Area
  - Total: 2.09 sq mi (5.41 km^{2})
  - Land: 2.07 sq mi (5.37 km^{2})
  - Water: 0.015 sq mi (0.04 km^{2})
- Elevation: 217 ft (66 m)

Population (2020)
  - Total: 1,998
  - Estimate (2025): 1,813 ▼
  - Density: 964.1/sq mi (372.25/km^{2})
- Time zone: UTC−06:00 (Central (CST))
  - Summer (DST): UTC−05:00 (CDT)
- ZIP Code: 72006
- Area code: 870
- FIPS code: 05-02740
- GNIS feature ID: 2403137

Augusta, officially the City of Augusta, is a city in Woodruff County, Arkansas, United States, located on the east bank of the White River. The population was 1,998 as of the 2020 Census. The city is the county seat of Woodruff County.

== History ==
In 1848, Thomas Hough had the village of Chickasaw Crossing, Arkansas, surveyed and laid out. The location was a natural riverboat landing spot on the navigable White River. In 1850, Hough renamed the settlement after his niece, Augusta Cald. Incorporated on July 9, 1860, in Jackson County, the town of Augusta became a part of Woodruff County when it was formed in the 1860s.

After the chaos of the American Civil War and its immediate aftermath, Augusta entered its greatest period of prosperity in the 1870s as a year-round riverboat transport point for a wide variety of goods, serving vessels from as far away as Memphis and New Orleans. Thus, when railroads began entering the county in the late 1800s, Augusta opted out of the apparently-unnecessary innovation and allowed their town to be bypassed by the tracks. When river traffic began to decline, the citizens realized their mistake, and decided to build their own railroad to link to the national rail grid. What became the Augusta Railroad lasted from 1886 to 1958 or 1959.

== Geography ==
Augusta is located approximately 75 miles (121 km) northeast of Little Rock and 81 miles (130 km) west of Memphis, Tennessee. (Note: Mileages are based on highway miles.) According to the United States Census Bureau, the city has a total area of 2.0 square miles (5.2 km^{2}), all land.

=== Region ===
Augusta is located in the Arkansas Delta, one of the six primary geographic regions of Arkansas. The Arkansas Delta is a subregion of the Mississippi Alluvial Plain, which is a flat area consisting of rich, fertile sediment deposits from the Mississippi River between Louisiana and Illinois. Prior to settlement, Woodruff County was densely forested, with bayous, sloughs, and swamps crossing the land. Seeking to take advantage of the area's fertile soils, settlers cleared the land to better suit row crops.

=== County ===
Although some swampland has been preserved in the Cache River NWR and some former farmland has undergone reforestation, the majority (56 percent) of the county remains in cultivation. (Note: In 2014, 114 thousand acres of soybeans, 58.7 thousand acres of rice, 14.6 thousand acres of wheat, 17 thousand acres of corn and 7 thousand acres of sorghum were planted in Woodruff County. Total acreage for those two crops is 211,600. Woodruff County is 594 square miles, which is 380,160 acres based on 640 acres per square mile. Acreage for the total crops (211,600) divided by acreage for the county (380,160) is 55.7 percent.)

The nearby Cache River NWR, owned by the United States Fish and Wildlife Service, is a preservation area maintaining the original features of the area. Stretching approximately 90 miles (140 km) across adjacent counties, the NWR is listed as a Ramsar wetlands of international importance, and serves as a key wintering area for ducks and the largest contiguous tract of bottomland hardwood forest in North America.

=== Climate ===
Woodruff County has a humid subtropical climate (Köppen Cfa). Woodruff County experiences all four seasons, although summers can be extremely hot and humid and winters are mild with little snow. July is the hottest month of the year, with an average high of 93 °F (33.9 °C) and an average low of 70 °F (21.1 °C). Temperatures above 100 °F (38 °C) are not uncommon. January is the coldest month with an average high of 49 °F (9.4 °C) and an average low of 27 °F (−2.8 °C). The highest temperature was 112 °F (44.4 °C), recorded in 1936 and 1972. The lowest temperature recorded was −11 °F (−24 °C), on January 8, 1942.

Climate data for Augusta Climate Data
Month	Jan	Feb	Mar	Apr	May	Jun	Jul	Aug	Sep	Oct	Nov	Dec	Year
Record high °F (°C)	87 (31)	85 (29)	90 (32)	97 (36)	99 (37)	109 (43)	112 (44)	112 (44)	109 (43)	98 (37)	87 (31)	81 (27)	112 (44)
Mean daily maximum °F (°C)	49 (9)	54 (12)	63 (17)	73 (23)	81 (27)	89 (32)	93 (34)	92 (33)	85 (29)	74 (23)	62 (17)	51 (11)	72 (22)
Mean daily minimum °F (°C)	27 (−3)	31 (−1)	39 (4)	48 (9)	58 (14)	67 (19)	70 (21)	69 (21)	60 (16)	48 (9)	39 (4)	30 (−1)	49 (9)
Record low °F (°C)	−11 (−24)	−10 (−23)	9 (−13)	24 (−4)	36 (2)	44 (7)	52 (11)	48 (9)	34 (1)	24 (−4)	11 (−12)	−4 (−20)	−11 (−24)
Average precipitation inches (mm)	3.6 (91)	3.8 (97)	4.8 (120)	5.0 (130)	5.5 (140)	2.9 (74)	3.7 (94)	2.7 (69)	3.4 (86)	4.7 (120)	5.2 (130)	5.0 (130)	50.3 (1,281)
Average snowfall inches (cm)	0.8 (2.0)	1.0 (2.5)	0.1 (0.25)	0 (0)	0 (0)	0 (0)	0 (0)	0 (0)	0 (0)	0 (0)	0 (0)	0.1 (0.25)	2.0 (5.1)
Source 1: The Weather Channel
Source 2: Weather Database

== Demographics ==
Historical population
Census	Pop.	Note	%±
1880	702		—
1890	519		−26.1%
1900	1,040		100.4%
1910	1,520		46.2%
1920	1,731		13.9%
1930	2,243		29.6%
1940	2,235		−0.4%
1950	2,317		3.7%
1960	2,272		−1.9%
1970	2,777		22.2%
1980	3,496		25.9%
1990	2,759		−21.1%
2000	2,665		−3.4%
2010	2,199		−17.5%
2020	1,998		−9.1%
2025 (est.)	1,813	▼	−9.3%
U.S. Decennial Census; 2014 Estimate

=== 2020 census ===
As of the 2020 census, Augusta had a population of 1,998. The median age was 45.0 years. 21.4% of residents were under the age of 18 and 23.2% of residents were 65 years of age or older. For every 100 females there were 88.1 males, and for every 100 females age 18 and over there were 85.8 males age 18 and over.

0.0% of residents lived in urban areas, while 100.0% lived in rural areas.

There were 901 households in Augusta, of which 23.3% had children under the age of 18 living in them. Of all households, 33.4% were married-couple households, 22.2% were households with a male householder and no spouse or partner present, and 37.4% were households with a female householder and no spouse or partner present. About 39.6% of all households were made up of individuals and 19.4% had someone living alone who was 65 years of age or older.

There were 1,053 housing units, of which 14.4% were vacant. The homeowner vacancy rate was 2.3% and the rental vacancy rate was 10.7%.

Racial composition as of the 2020 census
Race	Number	Percent
White	968	48.4%
Black or African American	913	45.7%
American Indian and Alaska Native	3	0.2%
Asian	4	0.2%
Native Hawaiian and Other Pacific Islander	0	0.0%
Some other race	21	1.1%
Two or more races	89	4.5%
Hispanic or Latino (of any race)	37	1.9%

=== 2000 census ===
As of the census of 2000, there were 2,665 people, 1,070 households, and 741 families residing in the city. The population density was 1,357.4 inhabitants per square mile (524.1/km^{2}). There were 1,164 housing units at an average density of 592.9 per square mile (228.9/km^{2}). The racial makeup of the city was 55% White, 42.99% Black or African American, 2% Native American, 0.08% from other races, and 0.64% from two or more races. 0.38% of the population were Hispanic or Latino of any race.

There were 1,070 households, out of which 32.3% had children under the age of 18 living with them, 42.2% were married couples living together, 22.8% had a female householder with no husband present, and 30.7% were non-families. 28.1% of all households were made up of individuals, and 13.3% had someone living alone who was 65 years of age or older. The average household size was 2.46 and the average family size was 3.00.

In the city, the population was spread out, with 28.3% under the age of 18, 9.2% from 18 to 24, 24.8% from 25 to 44, 23.2% from 45 to 64, and 14.5% who were 65 years of age or older. The median age was 36 years. For every 100 females, there were 90.8 males. For every 100 females age 18 and over, there were 81.5 males.

The median income for a household in the city was $21,500, and the median income for a family was $24,506. Males had a median income of $24,781 versus $18,176 for females. The per capita income for the city was $12,865. About 23.6% of families and 28.9% of the population were below the poverty line, including 41.9% of those under age 18 and 24.9% of those age 65 or over.

== Education ==
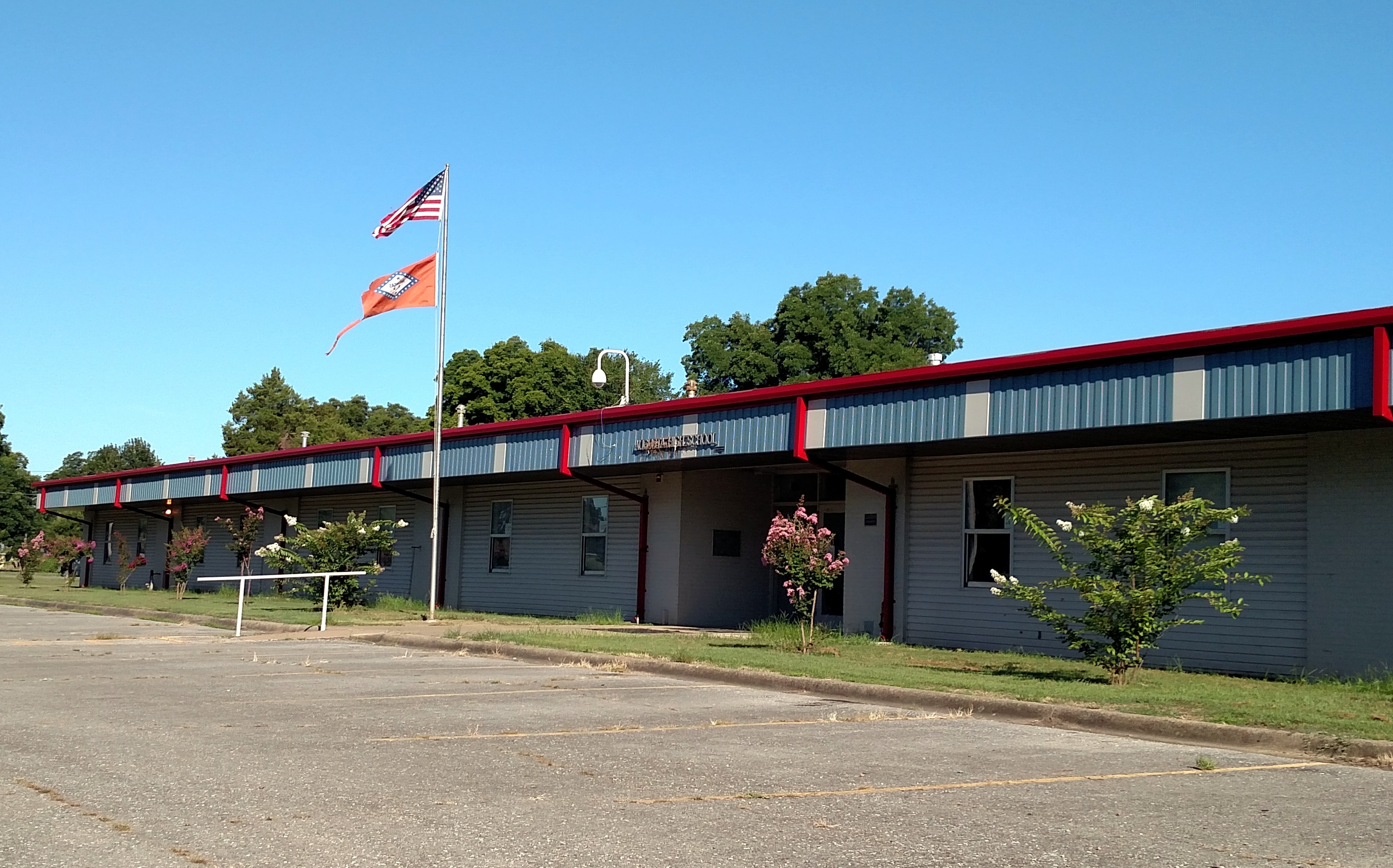
Augusta High School

Public education for early childhood, elementary and secondary school students is provided by the Augusta School District, which leads to graduation from Augusta High School.

== Transportation ==
Augusta sits on US Route 64 and State Highway 33.

Woodruff County Airport (FAA LID: M60) is a county-owned public-use airport four nautical miles (5 mi, 7 km) east of the central business district of Augusta.

== Historic places ==
Multiple sites in and around Augusta are on the National Register of Historic Places including the Augusta Commercial Historic District (roughly bounded by 1st, Main, 2nd, and Pearl streets), the Augusta Electrical Generating Plant, the Augusta Memorial Park Historic Section, the Augusta Presbyterian Church, the Ferguson House, the George Washington Carver High School Home Economics Building, Gregory House, the Jess Norman Post 166 American Legion Hut, the Mathis-Hyde House, and the Woodruff County Courthouse.

== Tourist attractions ==
Cache River National Wildlife Refuge, headquartered in Augusta but located just south of town, protects wetland habitats for migrating waterfowl together with other wildlife, and includes some of the most intact and least disturbed bottomland hardwood forests in the Mississippi Valley region.

The 64 Speedway was a popular short track motor racing location which closed in 2007.

== Notable people ==
- Michael John Gray, Democratic former member of the Arkansas House of Representatives (2015-2019) and state Democratic Party chairman
- Jimmy Gunn, professional football player.
- John D. Price, U.S. Navy admiral who held five aviation world records.
- Billy Ray Smith, Sr., professional football player; father of Billy Ray Smith, Jr.
