= Carver High School (Pascagoula, Mississippi) =

Segregated African-American school

Location
- Pascagoula, Mississippi; United States; 30.3619°N 88.5491°W

Information
- Former name: Pascagoula Negro Carver High School
- Type: Public
- Status: closed

Carver High School was a public secondary school in Pascagoula, Mississippi. It served as the high school for black students until the public schools were integrated in 1971. For a time, Pascagoula High School 10th graders attended "The Annex" in the former Carver High School building due to the limited capacity of the old Pascagoula High School. After a new high school was built in 1997, the building stayed dormant until 2012, when it was reopened as the Aaron Jones Interactive Center, named after a longtime coach at Carver.

== History ==
The first school for negroes in Pascagoula, known as "the Coloured School", was opened in 1890. In 1904 it expanded to two rooms. The school was later moved and renamed Pascagoula Negro Carver High School, then later renamed Carver High School. The first graduating class to attend all the way through was in 1941. In the 1970-1971 school year when the schools were integrated with the previously all-white Pascagoula High School, forty-two black students attended the integrated school.

== Notable alumni ==
- Dr. Calvin Huey, first African-American to play football at Navy graduated from Carver
