= Choctaw, Oklahoma and Gulf Railroad =

American railroad

Overview
- Headquarters: McAlester, Oklahoma
- Locale: Oklahoma, Arkansas, and Texas
- Dates of operation: 1888–1948
- Successor: Chicago, Rock Island and Pacific Railroad

The Choctaw, Oklahoma and Gulf Railroad (CO&G), known informally as the "Choctaw Route," was an American railroad in the states of Arkansas and Oklahoma.

== Origins ==
The company, originally known as the Choctaw Coal and Railway Company, completed its main line between West Memphis, Arkansas, and western Oklahoma by 1900. In 1901, the CO&G chartered a subsidiary company, the Choctaw, Oklahoma and Texas Railroad, to continue construction west into the Texas Panhandle, and by 1902, the railroad had extended as far west as Amarillo.

== Tecumseh Railway ==
Following the CO&G's construction from McAlester to Oklahoma City through the town of Shawnee in 1895, the Tecumseh Railway was incorporated under the laws of Oklahoma Territory on August 20, 1896. That same year, the Tecumseh built 5.2 miles of rail from a junction near Shawnee to Tecumseh, Oklahoma, which at that time was acting as the county seat. The Tecumseh Railway never had any other trackage, and on December 12, 1900, it was purchased by the CO&G. In 1902, the CO&G added 20.2 miles to the line, extending it from Tecumseh to Asher, which was a cotton-producing area that also experienced a short-lived oil boom starting in the late 1920s. This route, served by faithful vintage locomotive Old Beck, was among the CO&G assets later acquired by the Rock Island; but the whole line was abandoned on February 10, 1942.

== Choctaw Northern Railroad ==
The Watonga and Northwestern Railroad was incorporated in Oklahoma Territory on May 19, 1900. Its name changed to the Choctaw Northern Railroad on March 22, 1901. Though not originally controlled by the CO&G, this railway did, in the 1901–1902 timeframe, build its main line from a connection with the CO&G at Geary, Oklahoma, north toward the Oklahoma–Kansas border, about 106 miles distant. It passed through or created towns along the way such as Greenfield, Watonga and Homestead in Blaine County; Cleo Springs, originally Cleo, in Major County; and, in Alfalfa County, the towns of Aline, Augusta, Lambert, Ingersoll, Driftwood, and Amorita. At the border, it continued about 16 miles north through Waldron, Kansas, where it crossed the line of the Kansas City, Mexico and Orient Railroad to end at Anthony, Kansas, which had existed at the intersection of the St. Louis–San Francisco Railroad (a predecessor of the St. Louis–San Francisco Railway) and the Missouri Pacific Railway since at least 1891. This gave it a mainline of about 121 miles. It also built a branch from its line at Ingersoll—a town created by the railroad—west to the Woods County seat of Alva, Oklahoma, about 16 miles. This gave the railway a total trackage of about 137–138 miles. This railroad was conveyed to the CO&G on May 3, 1902.

== Choctaw and Memphis Railroad ==
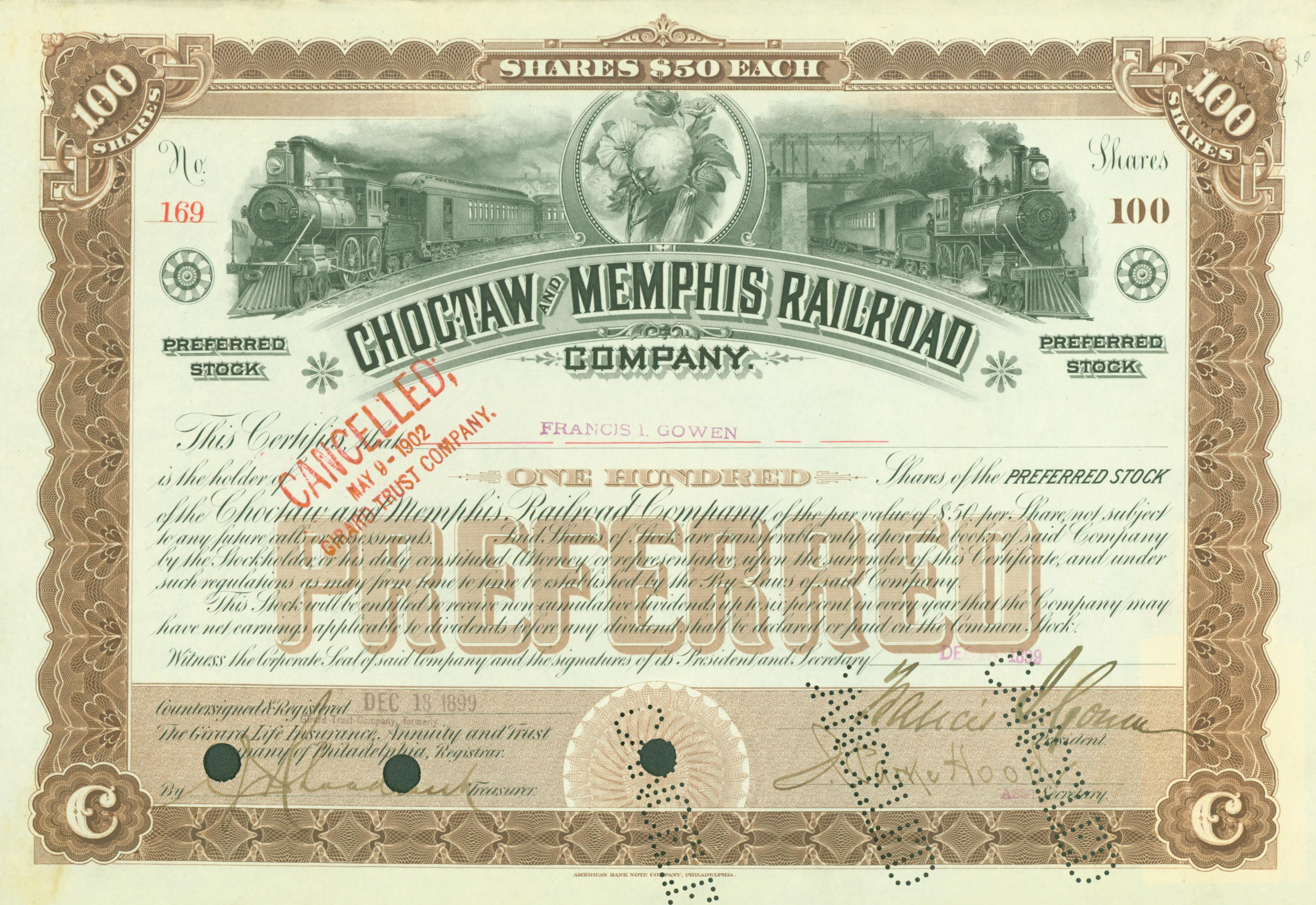
Preferred share of the Choctaw and Mephis Railroad Company, issued 18 December 1899

An entity called the Choctaw and Memphis Railroad (C&MR), a publicly traded company, on October 25, 1898, purchased at foreclosure the Memphis and Little Rock Railroad. That was a line running 133 miles from Hopefield, Arkansas, which was a ferry crossing point to Memphis, Tennessee, across the Mississippi River, and ending in Huntersville, now known as North Little Rock, Arkansas. As the new owner, the C&MR then began building west, including a bridge over the Arkansas River to Little Rock. That bridge later became known as the Rock Island Bridge, and is today the Clinton Presidential Park Bridge at the Clinton Presidential Center in Little Rock.

The C&MR was sold to the CO&G in 1900. The CO&G extended its Oklahoma tracks to meet the Little Rock line.

== The White and Black River Valley Railway ==
The White and Black River Valley Railway (W&BRV), previously called the Batesville and Brinkley Railroad, had a line between the towns of Brinkley and Jacksonport, as well as a branch line between Wiville and Gregory, entirely within the State of Arkansas and about 62 miles in total length. On July 1, 1900, the CO&G took up operation of the W&BRV under an 80-year lease.

== Western Oklahoma Railroad ==
The Western Oklahoma Railroad (WORR) was incorporated in what was then the Territory of Oklahoma on December 11, 1900. This railway was a CO&G creation from the beginning; the CO&G arranged financing and agreed to purchase WORR's trackage once finished. Construction started in March, 1901, and was completed by May 1, 1902, on two different lines. One was a 40.1 mile line from Elk City to the Texas state line near Texola, Oklahoma. The other was a 117.5-mile line from a branch junction near Haileyville, Oklahoma, off of the Rock Island Memphis-Tucumcari line, through Tishomingo to Ardmore, Oklahoma. The CO&G purchased the lines on May 1, 1902, and operated the tracks from the first day.

== Choctaw, Oklahoma and Western Railroad ==
Originally incorporated as the Choctaw, Oklahoma and Gulf Railroad Company under the laws of Oklahoma Territory on January 23, 1902 (and not to be confused with the main CO&G corporate entity), this CO&G subsidiary built a 38.5 mile line between Guthrie, Oklahoma and Chandler, Oklahoma in the 1902-1903 timeframe. It changed its name to the Choctaw, Oklahoma and Western Railroad on May 5, 1902. (This line was abandoned June 1, 1924.)

== The Rock Island ==
The CO&G came under the control of the Chicago, Rock Island and Pacific Railroad (the Rock Island) in 1902, and was formally merged into the Rock Island on January 1, 1948. The Memphis-Amarillo route remained an important main line for the Rock Island, hosting local and transcontinental freight traffic, as well as passenger trains such as the Choctaw Rocket from 1940 to 1964.

== The Choctaw Route today ==
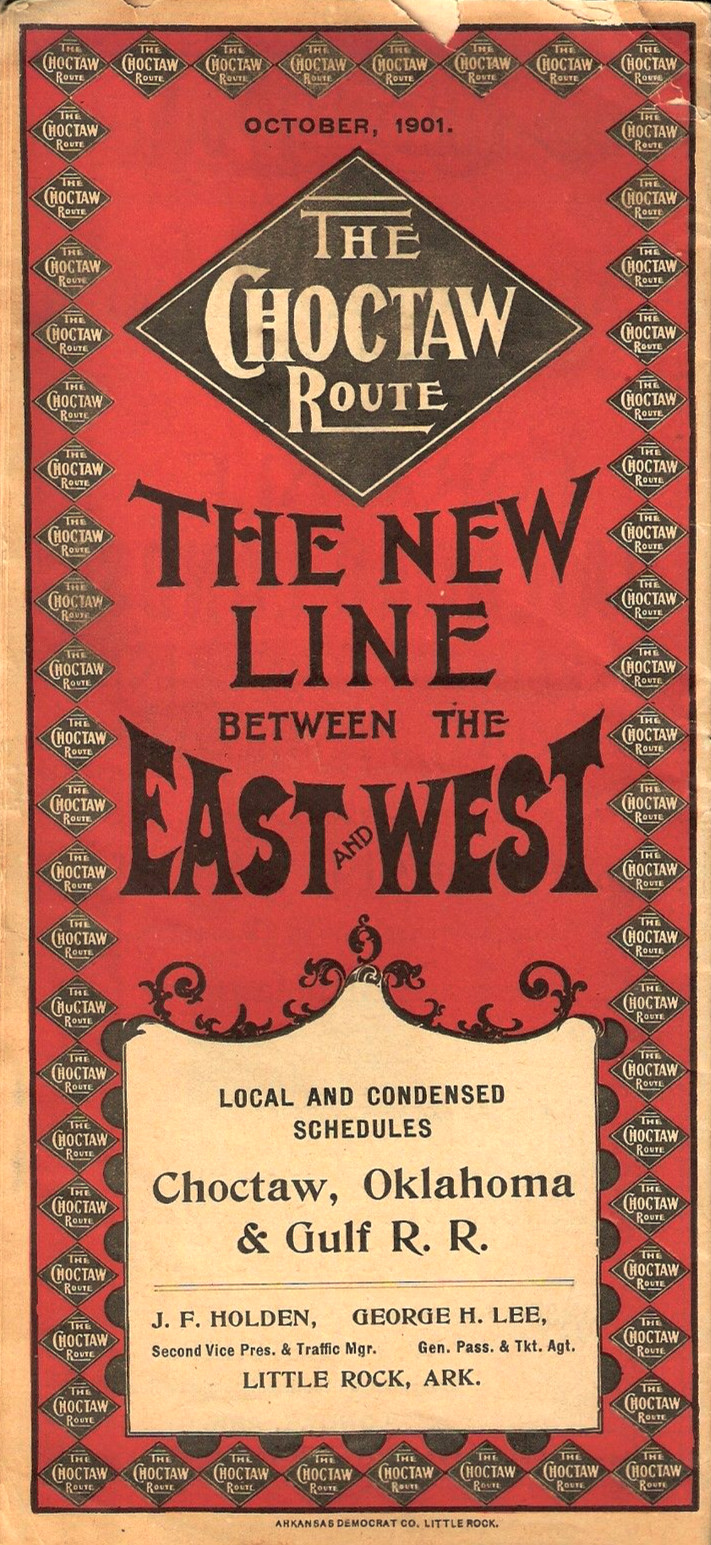
Cover of a 1901 timetable

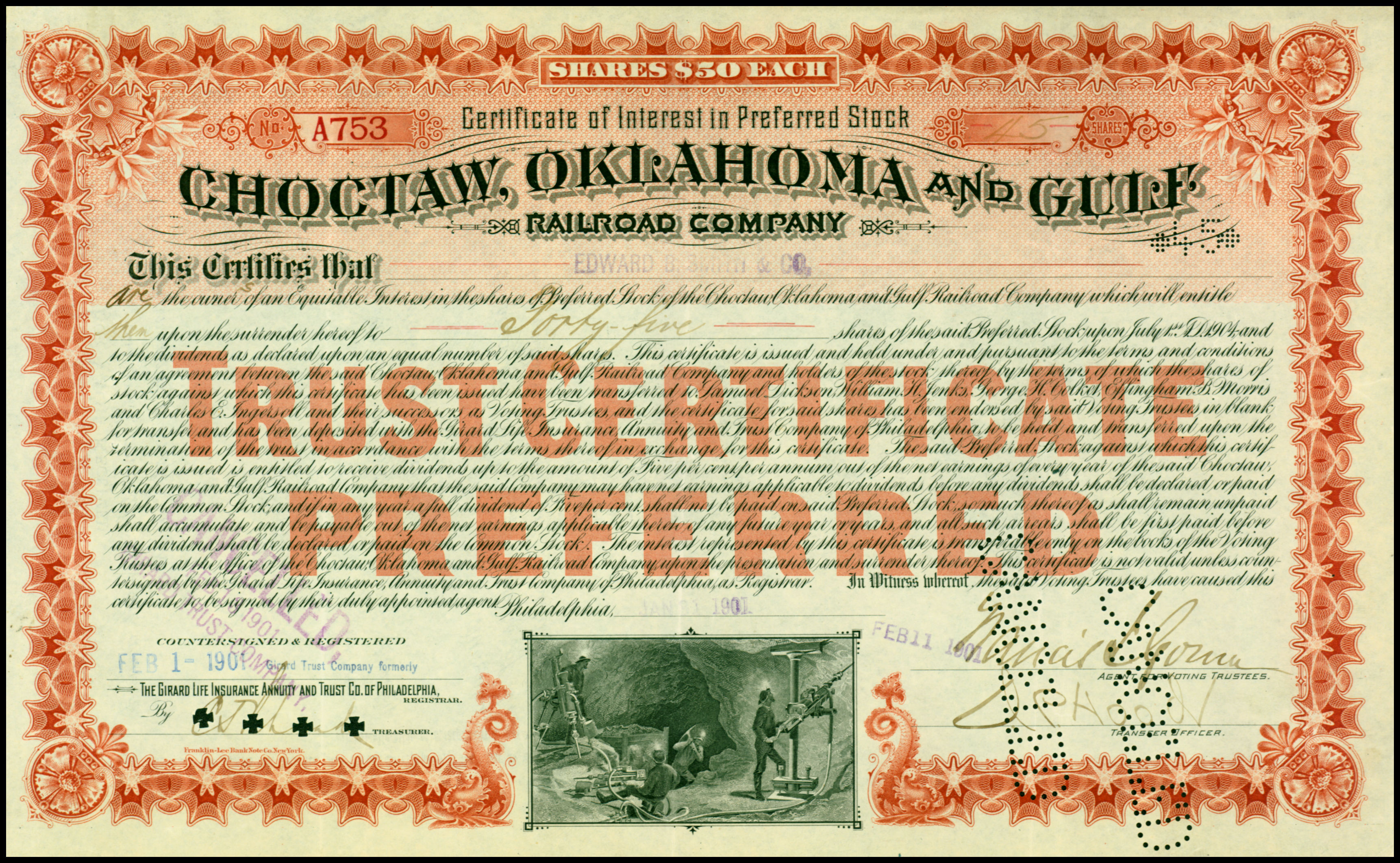
Preferred share of the Choctaw, Oklahoma and Gulf RR company, issued 1901

Ownership of the Choctaw Route's railway components were split into numerous pieces as a result of the dissolution of the Rock Island Railroad in 1980. Some segments of the former CO&G were abandoned; others remain in use by the Union Pacific Railroad and various short lines. As of 2014, the former Choctaw Route can be described from east to west as:

- Memphis, Tennessee to Brinkley, Arkansas: active; owned by Union Pacific
- Brinkley to the eastern side of Little Rock: abandoned, with rail removed; lift bridge over White River near De Valls Bluff still standing, locked open
- Little Rock to Danville: active; operated by the Little Rock and Western Railway
- Danville to Howe, Oklahoma: abandoned, with rail removed; owned by the State of Oklahoma
- Howe to McAlester: active; owned and operated by the Arkansas–Oklahoma Railroad
- McAlester to Shawnee: disused, with rail in place but most road crossings paved over. Owned by the UP, last operated by Union Pacific in 1996
- Shawnee to Oklahoma City: active; owned by Union Pacific, operated by the Arkansas-Oklahoma Railroad
- Oklahoma City to El Reno: active; owned by Union Pacific, operated by Union Pacific and AT&L Railroad
- El Reno to Geary: active; owned and operated by AT&L railroad
- Geary to Watonga Spur: active; owned and operated by AT&L Railroad
- Geary to Bridgeport: Active; Owned by the State of Oklahoma, operated by AT&L Railroad
- Bridgeport to Weatherford: Out of service; owned by the State of Oklahoma. Rails are still in place for most of this segment, but several sections are washed out.
- Weatherford to Erick: active; owned by the State of Oklahoma, operated by the Farmrail Corporation
- Erick, Oklahoma to east end of Amarillo, Texas: abandoned, with rail removed

The former Choctaw Route passenger depot in Little Rock, Arkansas, is now a component of the William J. Clinton Presidential Center and Park, though the adjoining historic freight depot was razed as part of the Clinton Center's development.

== See also ==
- Francis I. Gowen
