= Gowen =

Gowen may refer to:

== People ==
- Alan Gowen (1947–1981), rock keyboardist
- Bradford Gowen (1946–), American pianist
- Clonie Gowen (1971–), American poker player
- Francis I. Gowen (1855–1927), American industrialist
- Franklin B. Gowen (1836–1889), president of the Philadelphia and Reading Railroad
- James Robert Gowen (1784–1862) English horticulturist and New Zealand Company director
- John Graweere (1615–living 1641), also known as John Gowen, one of the first Africans in Virginia
- John Whittemore Gowen (1893–1967), American biologist
- Zach Gowen (1983–), American wrestler

== Places ==
- Gowen, Michigan, United States, an unincorporated community
- Gowen, Oklahoma, United States, an unincorporated community
- Boise Airport, Idaho, United States, also known as Gowen Field
- Gowen County, New South Wales, Australia

== Other uses ==
- Major Gowen, a fictional character in the BBC sitcom Fawlty Towers
- Gowen Cypress, a tree species

== See also ==
- Gawen, a given name and surname
