= Johnnie S. Aikens =

American politician (1914–1986)

Johnnie S. Aikens (September 11, 1914 – January 5, 1986) was a Democratic politician who served in the Missouri House of Representatives. Born in Cotton Plant, Arkansas, he was first elected to the Missouri House of Representatives in 1966.
