= Wiville, Arkansas =

Populated place in Arkansas, US

Coordinates: 35°08′53″N 91°14′27″W

Wiville is a populated place in Woodruff County, Arkansas, about 8 miles south of McCrory, 11 miles southeast of Augusta, and 9 miles north of Cotton Plant. It is located along Arkansas Highway 17.

== History ==
At one time the location, then known as Coats, Arkansas, became a transportation crossroads. The Batesville and Brinkley Railroad built through around 1882. Sometime later, a railroad called the Augusta and Southeastern Railway built a 6-mile connecting line out of Coats to Gregory, Arkansas, on its west. When the Batesville and Brinkley became the White and Black River Valley Railway in 1890, it bought the Augusta and Southeastern and kept operating both lines. The town became known as Wiville sometime between 1894 and 1898, purportedly because the community had become so famous for being the location of the "Y" branch in the railroad line. By 1904, the line was operated under lease by the Chicago, Rock Island and Pacific Railway ("Rock Island"). The line remained a separate part of the Rock Island until abandoned in pieces, with Wiville to Gregory done in 1934, and the remaining Brinkley to Newport portion through Wiville done in 1941.

As of 2000, the locale was an agricultural area for cotton, rice, soybeans, wheat and fish. It had about 10 residents and 4 houses.
