= Cotton Plant School District =

Defunct school district in Arkansas, United States

Cotton Plant School District No. 1 was a school district headquartered in Cotton Plant, Arkansas.

On July 1, 2004, it merged into the Augusta School District.
