= Cotton Plant Commercial Historic District =

Historic district in Arkansas, United States

- U.S. National Register of Historic Places
- U.S. Historic district
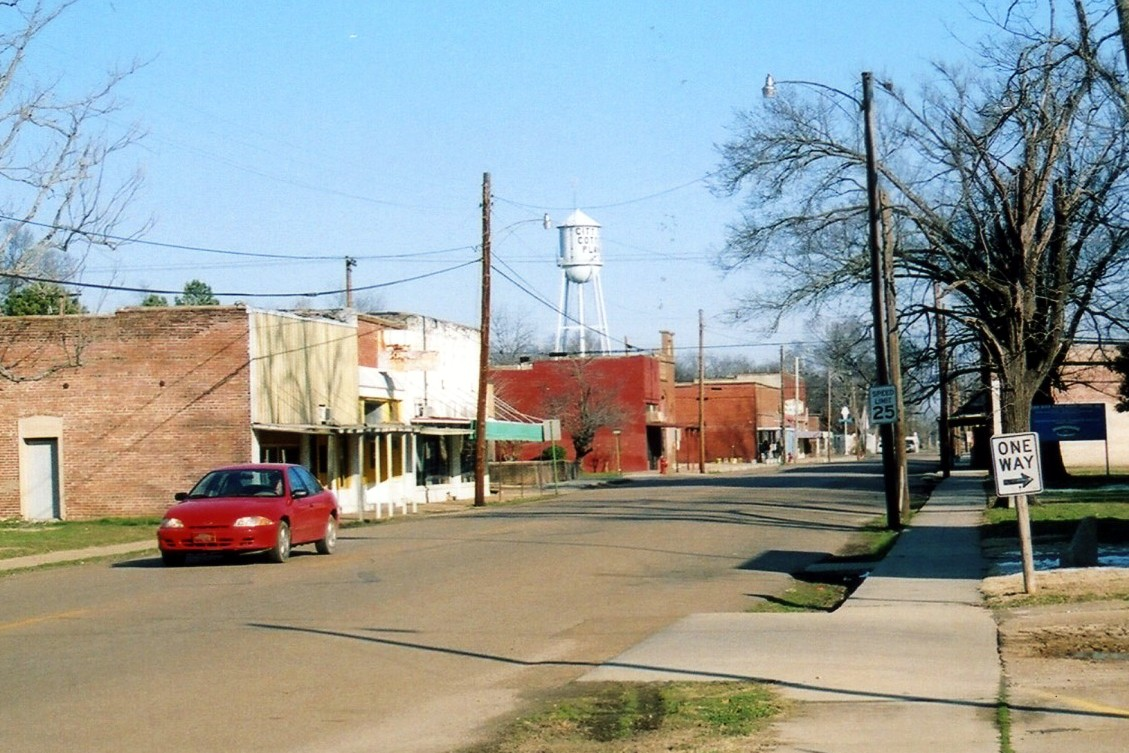

- Location within Arkansas Location within the United States
- Location: Main St. roughly between Pine and Ash Sts., Cotton Plant, Arkansas
- Coordinates: 35.00462°N 91.25189°W
- Area: 8.3 acres (3.4 ha)
- Built: 1901
- Architectural style: Early Commercial, Classical Revival
- NRHP reference No.: 08000946
- Added to NRHP: September 25, 2008

The Cotton Plant Commercial Historic District encompasses the historic civic and commercial center of the city of Cotton Plant, Arkansas. It includes about two blocks of Main Street (Arkansas Highway 38), between Elm and Ash on the south side, and between Pine and just short of Vine on the north side. The district includes 19 historically significant buildings dating, most of which were built between about 1900 and 1930. The town grew as a railroad shipping center for cotton beginning in the 1880s, but major fires in 1901 and 1924 devastated parts of its downtown, resulting in a large number of early 20th-century commercial brick buildings.

The district was listed on the National Register of Historic Places in 2008.

== See also ==
- National Register of Historic Places listings in Woodruff County, Arkansas
