= Billy Ray Smith Sr. =

American football player (1935–2001)

- Smith Sr.

No. 80, 77, 83, 74
- Positions: Defensive tackle, defensive end

Personal information
- Born: January 27, 1935; Augusta, Arkansas, U.S.
- Died: March 21, 2001 (aged 66); Little Rock, Arkansas, U.S.
- Listed height: 6 ft 4 in (1.93 m)
- Listed weight: 240 lb (109 kg)

Career information
- College: Arkansas
- NFL draft: 1957: 3rd round, 26th overall pick

Career history
- Los Angeles Rams (1957); Pittsburgh Steelers (1958–1960); Baltimore Colts (1961–1962, 1964–1970)

Awards and highlights
- Super Bowl champion (V); NFL champion (1968); Second-team All-Pro (1968); First-team All-SWC (1956)

Career NFL statistics
- Fumble recoveries: 16
- Interceptions: 1
- Sacks: 69.5
- Stats at Pro Football Reference

Billy Ray Smith Sr. (January 27, 1935 – March 21, 2001) was an American professional football player who was a defensive lineman in the National Football League (NFL) from 1957 to 1970. He played college football for the Arkansas Razorbacks. Smith was born in Augusta, Arkansas.

== Early life ==
Smith was born in Augusta, Arkansas on January 27, 1935, to J.D. and Louise Smith. He attended Augusta High School where he played football under coach Curtis King from 1950 to 1952. In 1952, he made the All-American Prep team and in 1953, Smith played in the High School All-American game.

Smith was also a boxer. He was a Golden Gloves regional champion in 1953 and 1954, and won the South Heavyweight Championship in 1955 and 1956.

== College career ==
After graduating from Augusta High School, Arkansas head coach Bowden Wyatt offered Smith a football scholarship, and in 1953, Smith enrolled at the University of Arkansas. In 1954, Smith and the Razorbacks won the Southwest Conference Championship with only twenty-four players. They became known as the "24 Little Pigs", making their accomplishment all the more amazing. He played in the 1955 Cotton Bowl, and the Razorbacks were ranked in the top 10.

Wyatt would leave Arkansas after the 1954 season to coach his alma mater Tennessee, and was replaced by Jack Mitchell. In 1956, Smith was named first-team All-Southwest Conference. An additional highlight of Smith's time at Arkansas was that the Razorbacks defeated the Texas Longhorns three years in a row, in 1954 (20-7), 1955 (27-20), and 1956 (32-14).

Smith was inducted into the Arkansas Sports Hall of Fame in 1976, and enshrined into the University of Arkansas' Hall of Honor in 1994. He was named to the Arkansas All-Decade Team of the 1950s, and the Arkansas All-Century Team in 1994. In 1999, Sports Illustrated named him as one of the "Fifty Greatest Sports Figures from Arkansas".

== NFL career ==
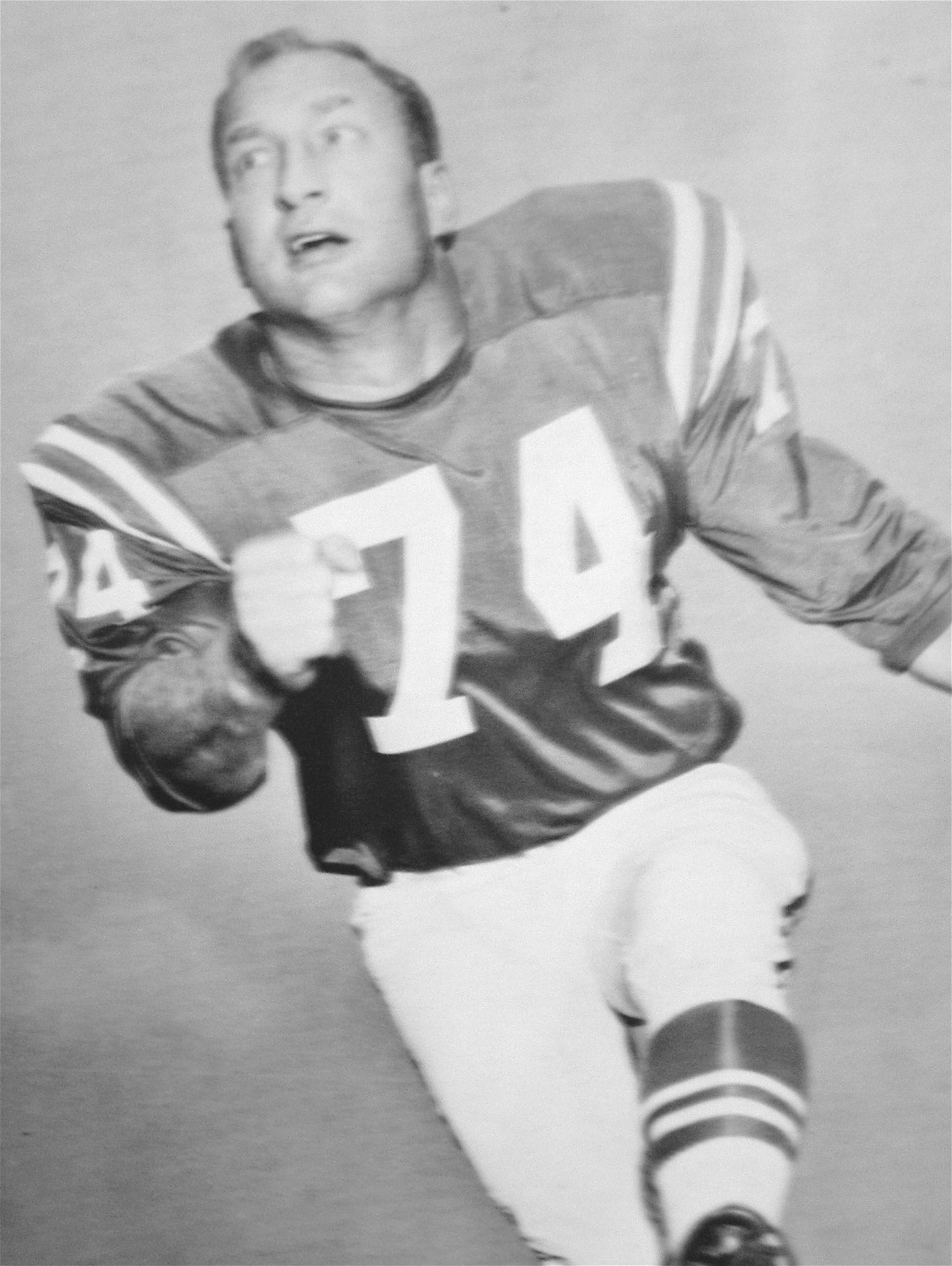
Billy Ray Smith in a Colts publicity photo.

Smith began his NFL career in 1957, as the third round draft pick for the Los Angeles Rams. He was traded to the Steelers in 1958 and played for Pittsburgh until 1960. In 1961, he was traded to the Baltimore Colts.

It was in Baltimore that he would make his mark on professional football. Nicknamed "The Rabbit" by his teammates, Smith became a mainstay and captain of a defensive line, which took the Colts to Super Bowl III and Super Bowl V during his career. His game motto was simple: "We always play for a shutout. Nothing fancy, nothing sensational. Just a shutout." Smith retired from professional football at the end of the 1970 season after the Colts defeated the Dallas Cowboys in Super Bowl V, ending his 13-year career.

Smith was small for a tackle, at only 230-235 pounds, but Pro Football Hall of Fame defensive tackle Art Donovan, a Baltimore Colt teammate for two years, observed of Smith, "'He intimidated a lot of people .... He was not really that big to be a defensive tackle but he was so aggressive.'" Gino Marchetti, a Hall of Fame defensive end and member of the NFL's 100th Anniversary Team, and another Colt linemate of Smith said, "He had all the desire that a guy could muster...." Marchetti also observed Smith was "strong as an ox". Smith's boxing skills also came into play on and off the field, including a legendary post-game fight with Philadelphia Eagles lineman Lum Snyder that went on for hours.

== Professional business career ==
During his professional football career, Smith had worked in the off-season in Baltimore as a broker for the investment banking firm Alex Brown & Sons, from 1965 to 1970. In 1970, he worked for White, Weld in Texas, and in 1978 he became head of Alex Brown's office in Dallas. He later joined Stephens, Inc., another investment firm (headquartered in Arkansas), retiring as a vice-president in 1996, due to health problems.

== Personal life and death ==
He was the father of two sons, two daughters, two stepdaughters, and a stepson. His son Billy Ray Jr. also played football at Arkansas, where he was a unanimous All-American in 1981 and 1982. He was later inducted into the College Football Hall of Fame in 2000. Smith Jr. went on to play as an NFL linebacker for ten years with the San Diego Chargers. Like his father, Billy Ray Jr. was named to the Arkansas All-Century team. Reflecting his father's professional business career, Billy Ray Jr. was a dean's list student and graduated with a degree in finance. He is considered one of the greatest Chargers players in the team's history. He became a sportscaster and sports talk radio host in San Diego after retiring as a player.

Smith was ROTC at Arkansas, and commissioned a Second Lieutenant in the Air Defense Artillery in 1958, serving in the Air Reserve until 1965. Smith's son Kevin Bruce Smith attended the U.S. Military Academy at West Point, and was a lieutenant colonel and battalion commander at the time of Smith's death in 2001.

Smith died from cancer on March 23, 2001.
