= Augusta School District (Arkansas) =

School district in Arkansas

Location
- 320 Sycamore Street; Augusta, Arkansas 72006 United States

District information
- Type: Public (government funded)
- Grades: PK–12
- NCES District ID: 0502670

Students and staff
- Students: 549
- Teachers: 60.00 (on FTE basis)
- Staff: 124.00 (on FTE basis)
- Student–teacher ratio: 9.15
- Colors: Cardinal; White

Other information
- Website: www.augustasd.org

Augusta School District is a public school district serving the communities of Augusta, Arkansas, United States. Augusta School District employs over more than 120 faculty and staff to provide educational programs for students ranging from prekindergarten through twelfth grade at its three facilities that enroll more than 500 students.

The school district encompasses 357.52 square miles (926.0 km^{2}) of land within Woodruff and Monroe counties including all or portions of the communities of Augusta, Cotton Plant, and Gregory.

All schools in the district are accredited by the Arkansas Department of Education.

== History ==
On July 1, 2004, the Cotton Plant School District merged into the Augusta School District.

== Schools ==
- Augusta High School (Augusta): Grades 7–12
- Augusta Elementary School (Augusta) : Grades PK–6

Closed:

- Cotton Plant Elementary School (Cotton Plant) : Grades PK–4 - In 2014 the Augusta school district planned to close Cotton Plant Elementary and the Arkansas Department of Education (ADE) approved the closure.
