= Arkansas–Oklahoma Railroad =

Class III American rail carrier

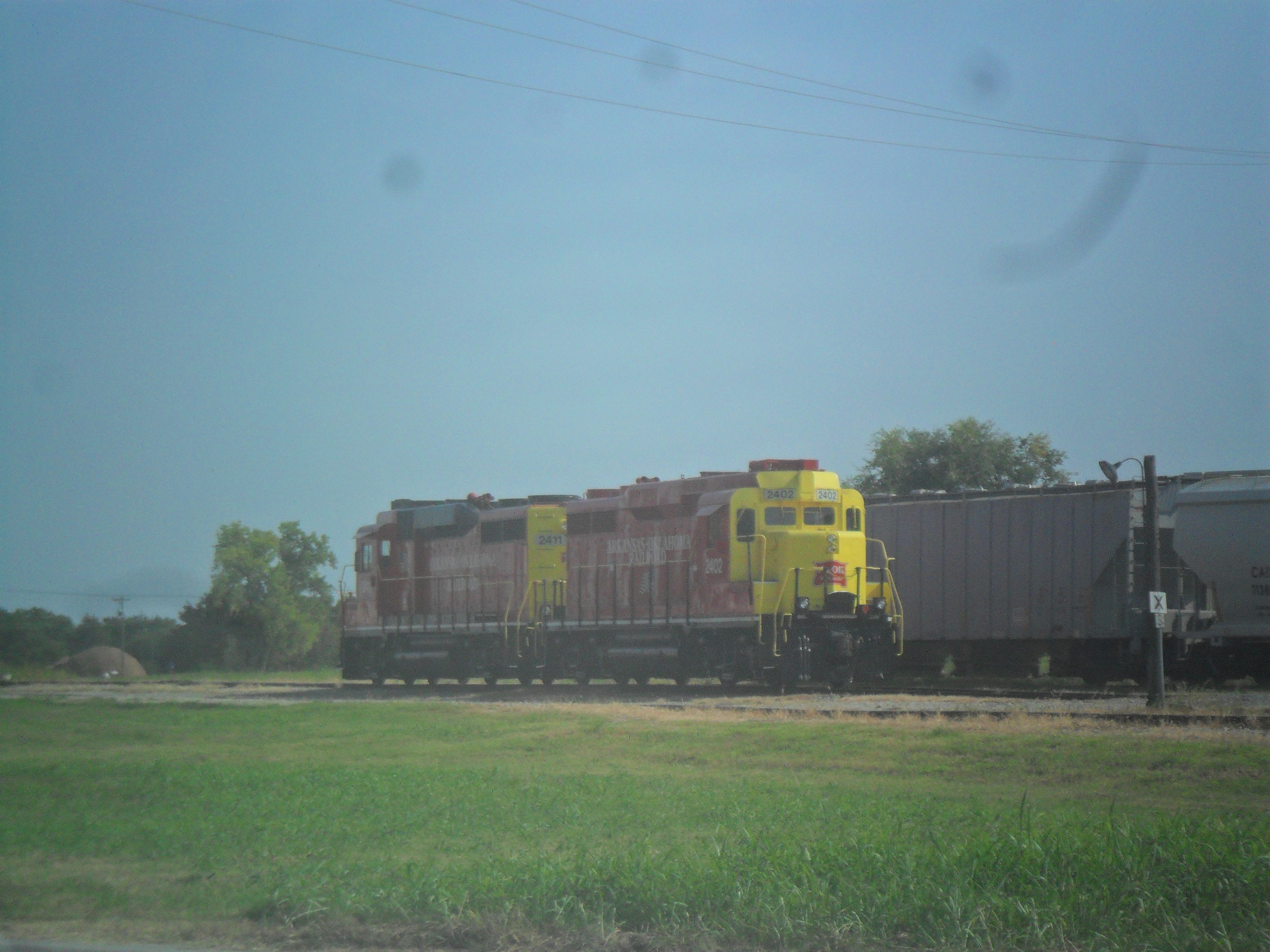
- AOK 2402 and 2411, both EMD GP30s, sit in the AOK railyard at Shawnee, Oklahoma, September 9, 2017.

Overview
- Reporting mark: AOK
- Locale: Oklahoma
- Dates of operation: 1996–present

Technical
- Track gauge: 4 ft 8 1/2 in (1,435 mm)

The Arkansas–Oklahoma Railroad (reporting mark AOK) is a Class III carrier headquartered in Wilburton, OK that operates two segments of the former Chicago, Rock Island and Pacific Railroad (CRIP) Choctaw Route that originally ran between Memphis Tennessee and Tucumcari, New Mexico. AOK started operations on March 3, 1996 on 73 miles (117 km) of track then owned by the U.S. state of Oklahoma between Howe and McAlester by assuming the existing lease of the Missouri Pacific, then wholly owned by the Union Pacific Railroad (UP). This lease included a purchase option which AOK exercised in April 2016. The line interchanges with the Kansas City Southern Railway at Howe, and with the UP at McAlester.

AOK also leases UP-owned trackage in McAlester (ex-Katy branch industrial branch lead) and additional Choctaw Route trackage west of McAlester to milepost 385 for service to the McAlester Industrial Park and for car storage.

AOK has also leased the 36-mile (58-km) Shawnee Branch from the UP running from Shawnee to a connection with the UP near Oklahoma City. The bridge over the Canadian River was restored in 2014 for service to the Citizen Potawatomi Nation Iron Horse Industrial Park, with the line open to milepost 445. AOK switches the Midwest City Automobile Logistics Facility. The Choctaw Route remains out of service between milepost 445 and 385.

AOK completed a lease and new switching agreement with BNSF for the Shawnee industrial lead in October 2021. This approximately 10 mile lead is the remnant of the Cushing to Paul's Valley Santa Fe line. With the completion of this agreement, AOK operates all traffic to Shawnee.
