= Gregory, Arkansas =

- Census-designated place
- Location within Arkansas Location within the United States
- Coordinates: 35°09′12″N 91°20′03″W
- Country: United States
- State: Arkansas
- County: Woodruff
- Elevation: 203 ft (62 m)

Population (2020)
  - Total: 43
- Time zone: UTC-6 (Central (CST))
  - Summer (DST): UTC-5 (CDT)
- ZIP code: 72059
- Area code: 870
- GNIS feature ID: 2805649

Gregory is an unincorporated community and census-designated place (CDP) in Woodruff County, Arkansas, United States. It was first listed as a CDP in the 2020 census with a population of 43. Gregory is located along Arkansas Highway 33, 9 miles (14 km) south of Augusta. Gregory has a post office with ZIP code 72059.

The town was important enough that Gregory got rail service in the late 19th Century, courtesy of the Augusta and Southeastern Railway, which was purchased by the White and Black River Valley Railway (W&BRV) on January 10, 1890. The line was a 6-mile branch off the W&BRV from Wiville, Arkansas which terminated at Gregory. However, the line was abandoned in 1934.

== Education ==
Public education for early childhood, elementary and secondary school students is provided by the Augusta School District, which leads to graduation from Augusta High School.

== Landmarks ==
The current post office is located on the west side of Arkansas Highway 33 at 20087 Highway 33 South. It is adjacent to the former Gregory Store, now currently a part-time restaurant, which for many years along with the post office was the most prominent Gregory landmark. The current store building was built in 1989 after fire destroyed the original Gregory Store location, which sat in the same approximate location for several years. The immediate past Gregory post office location sits across the street, but has remained unoccupied for several years. In addition to the Gregory Store and post office, two church buildings are among the area's landmarks. The first is Gregory Baptist Church, where services are still held as of October 2013. The church was founded in 1941, is a member of the Calvary Baptist Association, based in Judsonia, Arkansas, and is located at 20184 Highway 33 South (on the east side of Highway 33). Services begin at 10:00 AM each Sunday morning. Historic Reed Cemetery is located to the south of the church building along Highway 33. Many of the headstones in the cemetery indicate burial dates from the early 1800s. Additionally, Walnut Grove Baptist Church sits just around the corner from Gregory Baptist Church and adjacent to Reed Cemetery. Walnut Grove church holds regular services as well.

== Demographics ==
Historical population
Census	Pop.	Note	%±
2020	43		—
U.S. Decennial Census; 2020

=== 2020 census ===
Gregory CDP, Arkansas – Racial and ethnic composition Note: the US Census treats Hispanic/Latino as an ethnic category. This table excludes Latinos from the racial categories and assigns them to a separate category. Hispanics/Latinos may be of any race.
Race / Ethnicity (NH = Non-Hispanic)	Pop 2020	% 2020
White alone (NH)	33	76.74%
Black or African American alone (NH)	3	6.98%
Native American or Alaska Native alone (NH)	0	0.00%
Asian alone (NH)	0	0.00%
Native Hawaiian or Pacific Islander alone (NH)	0	0.00%
Other race alone (NH)	0	0.00%
Mixed race or Multiracial (NH)	5	11.63%
Hispanic or Latino (any race)	2	4.65%
Total	43	100.00%

== Notable people ==
- Little Johnny Taylor, blues and soul singer
