= Gawen =

Gawen is a masculine given name and a surname. It may refer to:

- Gawen Hamilton (1698–1737), Scottish painter
- Gawen Lawrie, English merchant and deputy governor of the American province of East Jersey from 1683 to 1686
- Gawen Bonzi Wells (born 1976), American former National Basketball Association player
- An old English spelling of Gawain - see The Wedding of Sir Gawain and Dame Ragnelle (The Weddynge of Syr Gawen and Dame Ragnell)
- John Gawen (died 1418), English Member of Parliament and lawyer

== See also ==
- Gowen (disambiguation)
