= Choctaw Rocket =

American named passenger train

Overview
- Service type: Inter-city rail
- Status: Discontinued
- Locale: Southwestern United States/Southeastern United States
- First service: 1940
- Last service: 1958
- Former operator: Chicago, Rock Island and Pacific Railroad

Route
- Termini: Memphis, Tennessee; Amarillo, Texas
- Distance travelled: 762 miles (1,226 km) (1949)
- Service frequency: Daily
- Train numbers: Westbound: 51; Eastbound: 52

On-board services
- Seating arrangements: Chair cars (1957)
- Sleeping arrangements: Sections, roomettes, double bedrooms and compartments
- Catering facilities: Dining car
- Observation facilities: Buffet lounge parlor car with radio and club lounge car

Technical
- Track gauge: 4 ft 8 1/2 in (1,435 mm)

The Choctaw Rocket was a named passenger train operated by the Chicago, Rock Island and Pacific Railroad between Memphis, Tennessee, Little Rock, Oklahoma City, and Amarillo. Initially designated as train No. 51 (westbound) and train No. 52 (eastbound), it was the first diesel powered streamliner to operate out of Memphis, Tennessee, as well as the first streamliner service in the state of Arkansas.

== History ==
The Choctaw Rocket followed a railway built by the Choctaw, Oklahoma and Gulf Railroad between 1900 and 1902, informally known as the Choctaw Route. The CO&G and its railways were purchased by the Rock Island railroad in 1902.

A predecessor train, along the same route, and having the numbers #51/52, had the name, Chocktaw Limited in the 1930s. After an inaugural tour at cities along the route, the Choctaw Rocket entered regular service on November 17, 1940.

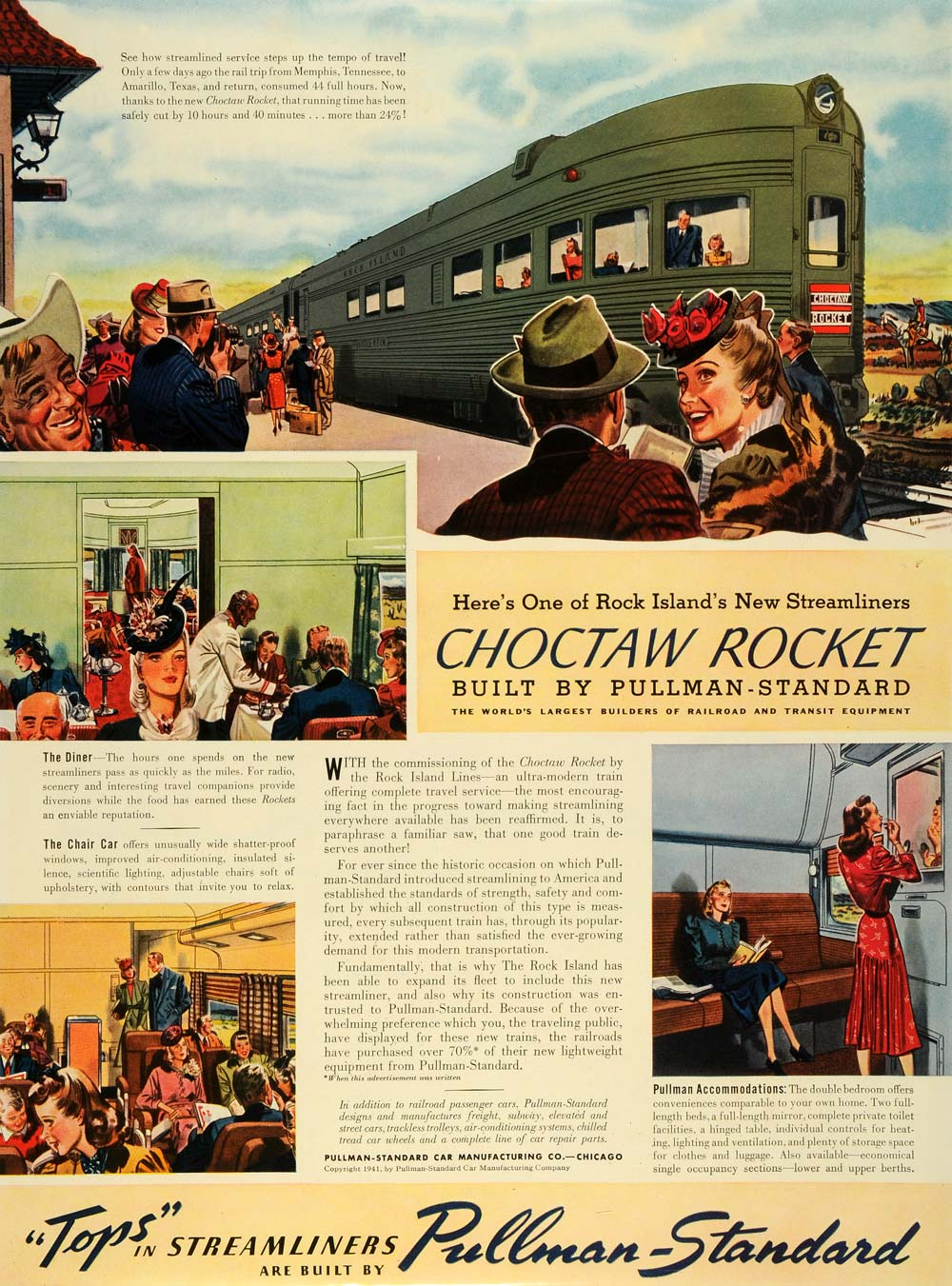
Ad for the new Choctaw Rocket by the train's builder, Pullman-Standard

The original locomotive and car assignments for the two Choctaw Rocket sets of equipment included E6 locomotives 628 and 629, modernized heavyweight railway post office-baggage cars 702 and 703, coaches 350-Amarillo, and 351-Oklahoma City, sleepers 622-Seminole, and 623-Wewoka, and dining-parlor-observation cars 430-Memphis, and 431-Little Rock. The coaches, sleepers and observation cars were all streamlined cars ordered from Pullman Standard Manufacturing Company, specifically for use on the Choctaw Rocket. The Choctaw Rocket when inaugurated operated between Memphis, Tennessee and Amarillo, Texas. In January 1949 it was restructured to operate only between Memphis and Oklahoma City, with a connecting non-Rocket train between Oklahoma City and Amarillo. Contrary to some beliefs, the Choctaw Rocket never operated to Tucumcari, New Mexico, although a companion Rock Island train on this route, the Memphis-Californian and the Cherokee, did operate to Tucumcari, New Mexico, connecting there with the Southern Pacific Railroad to continue service west to Los Angeles.

The Railway Mail Service utilized the Choctaw Rocket for United States mail transportation, sorting and distribution along the route. One railway post office crew worked between Memphis, Tennessee, and McAlester, Oklahoma, while a second crew operated between McAlester and Amarillo.

By 1952, the Choctaw Rocket had lost its Rocket designation, Rock Island's identification for the company's premier passenger trains, reflecting the route's downgrade to secondary train status. In August 1953, the conventional locomotive-pulled trains were replaced by self-propelled Budd rail diesel cars and the trains were renamed the Choctaw Rockette, a name which lasted until mid-1958.

After the discontinuance of Western Pacific's rail diesel car trains 1-2 (Salt Lake City-San Francisco) in 1960, the Rock Island's Memphis - Amarillo RDC route held the distinction of being the longest such route in the United States. Declining patronage and a desire by the Rock Island to close many small-town depots resulted in the discontinuance of this route, now designated as unnamed trains 23–24, with last runs occurring on August 8, 1964.
