= White and Black River Valley Railway =

Former railway in the US state of Arkansas

Overview
- Headquarters: Warren, Arkansas
- Locale: Arkansas
- Dates of operation: 1879–1941

Technical
- Track gauge: 4 ft 8 1/2 in (1,435 mm) standard gauge
- Previous gauge: originally 3 ft 6 in (1,067 mm)

The White and Black River Valley Railway (“W&BRV”), previously called the Batesville and Brinkley Railroad (“B&B”), had a line between the towns of Brinkley and Jacksonport, as well as a branch line between Wiville and Gregory, entirely within the State of Arkansas and about 62 miles in total length. Its predecessor railroad was started in 1879, and the final portion of the line was closed in 1941. The railroad began as a narrow-gauge railway which was modified to become even narrower, but later converted to standard gauge. It was operated under lease by other railroads for much of its lifespan.

== History ==
=== Cotton Plant Railroad ===
The prehistory of the W&BRV starts with the partnership of Gunn & Black, which owned a sawmill near Brinkley, Arkansas. To haul logs to their mill, the partnership on July 1, 1879 began operating a 3-foot 6-inch gauge private rail line which originated from their mill and was extended in the direction of the town of Cotton Plant which was 11 miles to the northwest. This line was informally called the Cotton Plant Railroad. When the company learned that the 3-foot gauge Texas and St. Louis Railway was going to be built through Brinkley (it actually arrived in 1883), Gunn & Black formally incorporated their Cotton Plant Railroad on April 16, 1881, and a few months later converted their line to the narrower gauge of the other carrier to facilitate interchange.

=== Batesville and Brinkley Railroad ===
Gunn & Black incorporated the Batesville and Brinkley Railroad on December 1, 1881, under the laws of Arkansas, for the stated purpose of extending their line through Newport—which had connections with the St. Louis, Iron Mountain and Southern Railway—and then continuing along the White River to Batesville. The new company bought out the Cotton Plant Railroad on June 22, 1882, which by that time had built 9 miles of track toward the town of Cotton Plant. B&B completed construction to Cotton Plant and beyond, extending through towns such as Coats (later known as Wiville), Colona, Riverside, Tupelo, Auvergne, and Newport to Jacksonport, reaching the latter in November 1886. This made the B&B main line between Brinkley and Jacksonport about 56 miles long. When the Texas and St. Louis Railway converted to standard gauge in 1886, the B&B concluded that it therefore needed to convert too, which it did two years later in 1888.

=== Augusta and Southeastern Railway ===
Separately, a railroad called the Augusta and Southeastern Railway entered the picture when it built its own rail line in the area. That company completed 6 miles of trackage between Coats, Arkansas—where it had a connection to the B&B-- and Gregory, Arkansas to the west.

=== W&BRV operation ===
The B&B changed names to become the White and Black River Valley Railway on January 10, 1890. It purchased the assets of the Augusta and Southeastern Railway on the same day, and operated not only service between Brinkley and Jacksonport, but also direct service to and from Gregory on some of its trains. In adding the 6-mile Coats/Wiville-to-Gregory segment, the railway reached its maximum length at 62 miles of single-track, standard-gauge steam railroad line. It could even have expanded further, having obtained Congressional approval in 1888 to build a bridge over the Black River, which it would have needed to construct the approximately 25 miles of track to connect Jacksonport to the railway’s original target of Batesville. But, no such trackage was ever added to the railroad’s total.

Primary traffic on the W&BRV was local crops, especially timber products and cotton. However, it also carried passengers. Travel times in 1898 between Brinkley and Jacksonport could be as little as 3 hours and 20 minutes, with trains leaving Brinkley at 7:15am and arriving in Jacksonport at 10:35am after 23 intermediate stops.

=== Operations under lease ===
The W&BRV operated independently up to July 1, 1900. After that date, the Choctaw, Oklahoma and Gulf Railroad took up operation of the line under an 80-year lease. The lease was assumed by the Chicago, Rock Island and Pacific Railway (“Rock Island”) when that railroad leased all the rights and property of the Choctaw, Oklahoma and Gulf on March 24, 1904. The line remained a separate part of the Rock Island until abandoned in pieces, with Newport to Jacksonport done in 1927, Wiville to Gregory done in 1934, and the remaining Brinkley to Newport portion done in 1941.
