= Francis I. Gowen =

American railroad executive

Francis Innes Gowen
- Born: 1855; Philadelphia, Pennsylvania
- Died: April 8, 1927; Philadelphia, Pennsylvania

Francis Innes Gowen (born 1855) was an American railroad executive.

== Early life ==
Gowen was born in Philadelphia in 1855, the son of James Emmet Gowen and Clementine Innes. His father was a noted railroad lawyer and his uncle, Franklin B. Gowen, was a president of the Philadelphia and Reading Railroad. Francis Gowen attended the University of Pennsylvania, but left during his junior year to study law. While studying, he was part of the Phi Kappa Sigma fraternity. He played on his class baseball and cricket teams as well as on the varsity cricket team from 1872 to 1874. Gowen was also a founder and vice president of the College Boat Club and a charter member of the University Athletic Association. After passing the Pennsylvania Bar, he practiced law with his father until James Gowen's death in 1885. His uncle, Franklin B. Gowen, continued to practice law after his tenure as president of the Philadelphia & Reading ended in 1883, and Francis Gowen joined his uncle's firm after his father's death. During this time, Gowen also became a director of the Girard Trust Company, a large banking firm in Philadelphia. After his uncle's sudden death in 1889, Francis I. Gowen formed a practice with James E. Hood and Charles E. Ingersoll.

== Oklahoma Connection ==
The Choctaw Coal and Railway Company had been established in Oklahoma Territory to construct a railroad, and to own and operate coal mines in Indian Territory and Oklahoma Territory. Girard Trust Company held much of the financial paper for this company, and when it was forced into receivership due to financial difficulties, Francis Gowen was appointed co-receiver with Edwin D. Chadick on January 8, 1891. When the railroad emerged from receivership on October 1, 1894, Francis Gowen was named president of the new company, now known as the Choctaw, Oklahoma and Gulf Railroad.

The CO&G was heavily involved in both rail transportation and coal mining, in much the same fashion as the Philadelphia and Reading Railroad under Franklin Gowen's leadership a decade earlier. The company owned and operated several large coal mines in Indian Territory, including one large mine at the new mining community of Gowen, located east of McAlester. Under the leadership of Francis Gowen, the Choctaw, Oklahoma and Gulf gradually expanded their territory to extend from McAlester east to Little Rock and Memphis, and west to Weatherford, Oklahoma Territory.

The Chicago, Rock Island and Pacific Railway during this time period was controlled by a group of investors known as the Reid-Moore Syndicate. This group favored aggressive expansion into new territory, and in early 1902 the Rock Island was able to gain control of the CO&G, resulting in the resignation of Francis Gowen from the presidency in June 1902. Gowen's law partner, Charles E. Ingersoll, became involved in the financing and construction of a second railroad in Indian Territory, the Midland Valley Railroad, after the Philadelphia businessmen were forced out of the Choctaw, Oklahoma & Gulf leadership. Gowen, however, ended his Oklahoma involvement and was appointed General Solicitor for the Pennsylvania Railroad in 1902. He remained with the Pennsylvania and continued to practice law, becoming General Counsel and vice-president for the railroad before retiring in the mid-1920s.
