= Franklin B. Gowen =

President of Philadelphia and Reading Railroad

Franklin Benjamin Gowen
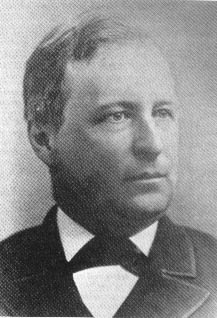
- Born: Franklin B. Gowen; February 9, 1836; Philadelphia, Pennsylvania, U.S.
- Died: December 13, 1889 (aged 53); Washington, D.C., U.S.
- Resting place: Ivy Hill Cemetery, Philadelphia, Pennsylvania, U.S.
- Occupations: Businessman, industrialist, monopolist, prosecutor, district attorney

Franklin Benjamin Gowen (February 9, 1836 – December 13, 1889) served as president of the Philadelphia and Reading Railroad, commonly referred to as the Reading Railroad, in the 1870s and 1880s. He is identified with the undercover infiltration and subsequent court prosecutions of Molly Maguires, mine workers, saloonkeepers and low-level local political figures who were tried for multiple acts of violence, including murder and attempted murder of coal mine operators, foremen, workers, and peace officers.

Other aspects of Gowen's presidency include:

- Despite the Reading Railroad being legally prohibited by its corporate charter from owning or operating coal mines, under Gowen's leadership the railroad obtained 142 square miles (368 km^{2}) of coal lands and illegally ran numerous mining operations upon them, but the state of Pennsylvania deemed the prohibition to be unenforceable.
- He was a central figure in negotiating both the first written labor agreement between mine workers and operators in the U.S., and the first industry-wide price-fixing agreement in the U.S.
- He played a signal role in the Great Railroad Strike of 1877, including the Reading Railroad Massacre.
- Under his leadership the Reading Railroad twice fell into bankruptcy. In the wake of the second one, Gowen was finally blocked from further direct involvement in the railroad's affairs when a syndicate led by J.P. Morgan obtained control of the corporation.

== Early years ==
Franklin Benjamin Gowen was born in Mount Airy, Pennsylvania, now part of Philadelphia, the fifth child of an Irish Protestant immigrant, James Gowen, a successful grocer, and his wife, Mary (née Miller), who was of German American descent.

Although his formal education was ended by his father at age 13, when he apprenticed the youth to a Lancaster, Pennsylvania merchant, as a young adult Gowen studied law with a local attorney in Pottsville, Pennsylvania. Following admission to the bar and joining the local Democratic party, he was elected District Attorney for Schuylkill County, Pennsylvania in 1862. He left that position in 1864 to pursue a private law practice that led him first to represent the Reading Railroad and a few years later to take on its presidency. Throughout his time with the railroad and afterward, Gowen continued practicing law and trying cases — sometimes as a special prosecutor on behalf of the state of Pennsylvania. At the time of his death, he was pursuing a case before the Interstate Commerce Commission on behalf of a private client against the Standard Oil trust. In the course of these hearings, Gowen cross-examined John D. Rockefeller.

== Family, education and early law practice ==
James Gowen, described later in life as a "hot-tempered, domineering, old Irishman", emigrated from Ireland in 1811. He was listed as a "wine merchant" in property records regarding his 1834 purchase of 500 S. 5th Street in Philadelphia for $3,000. The property, which would become the Gowen household and store, consisted of a brick building with retail space on the ground floor and living quarters above it. He sold the property to Peter Woods for $4,500. in 1846. James Gowen served as director, and later as comptroller, of Philadelphia's public schools; and also as a director of the Bank of Pennsylvania. He was an ardent Jeffersonian Democratic-Republican.

Franklin Gowen was the fifth of ten children born to James Gowen and Mary Miller. Mary, 16 years James's junior, came from an early-immigrated German family: by tradition, her ancestors had been closely associated with Francis Daniel Pastorius, founder of Germantown (now part of Philadelphia), the first permanent German settlement in Pennsylvania.

Prior to Franklin's birth in 1836, the Gowens moved from central Philadelphia to take up their residence in Mary's family home (James had bought out the interests of other family members) in Mt. Airy, just north of Germantown.

Young Franklin attended John Beck's Boys Academy, a boarding school in Lititz, Pennsylvania, from the ages of nine to thirteen. At that point, however, his formal schooling was curtailed. Instead he was apprenticed to a Lancaster dry goods merchant/coal dealer named Thomas Baumgardner, who held an interest in an iron furnace at Shamokin, Pennsylvania. Baumgardner liked and came to trust Franklin so that at age 19, Gowen found himself dispatched as clerk (i.e., bookkeeper) for that iron business. It was during this Shamokin period that Gowen met and courted his future wife, Esther Brisben (sometimes spelled Brisbane) of Sunbury.

After completing his apprenticeship, Gowen relocated to Pottsville, seat of Schuylkill County and the principal municipality in the southern portion of Pennsylvania's coal region. There he helped found the Pottsville Literary Society (at one of whose meetings he orated on "The Triumphs of Genius"), and entered into a partnership to operate a coal mine nearby. The mine failed (1859), leaving 23-year-old Gowen US$20,000 in debt. But undaunted Franklin Gowen—married now—studied law in the office of Benjamin Cumming, a Pottsville attorney. He was admitted to the bar in 1860.

He established his own practice, at the same time becoming active in the local Democratic party. Gowen served as Schuylkill County's elected District Attorney (1862–64), though in that period, according to his generally sympathetic biographer, he was "doing too well with his private practice to have time to bother with prosecuting criminals." Others argue that Gowen would have diligently prosecuted numerous cases but for his suspects uniformly being furnished with alibis by fellow criminals, some of whom he brought to justice two decades later as Mollie Maguires. Whatever Gowen's personal attitude towards his official duties, the climate in Schuylkill County at the time was less than conducive to normal conduct of criminal investigations: First, at that time an elected county sheriff was the principal law enforcement officer. Second, and much to the point during Gowen's tenure, in July 1863, roughly the midpoint of his D.A. service and of the Civil War, a national conscription act was passed to bolster Union forces. The eruption of anti-draft riots in New York and other cities threatened to replicate in Schuylkill County as well. Threats and violence, including murder, occurred in several localities. Federal troops were deployed to the county to face down these fierce anti-draft feelings and disruptions, and finally conscription was effected under military force. When his own draft number came up that same year, Gowen—by then a father of three—was well-off enough to pay for a substitute, a common practice among those who could afford it.

When Gowen left public office in 1864 in favor of his more lucrative private law practice, among his clients was the Reading Railroad. His practice prospered, and he was finally able to satisfy the lingering judgments against him from the mine failure and to buy a fashionable home in Pottsville.

In 1865, his two young sons—James and Franklin Benjamin, Jr.—died from illness, leaving his daughter Esther an only child: she was to have no other brothers or sisters. Also that spring Franklin's beloved younger brother, George, was killed in the final days of the Civil War. Col. George Gowen, who had originally moved to Schuylkill County to assist in his brother's mining enterprise, was regarded in Pottsville as a local hero, and the G.A.R. post and local militia company were given his name.

Much legal activity in Pottsville at the time had to do with clearing disputed land titles on behalf of both individuals and companies hoping to reap profits from the increasing anthracite trade. Beyond any work of this kind, Gowen was involved in representing the Reading against personal-injury negligence claims, some of which he argued successfully before the state Supreme Court, exonerating the Reading from liability.

Throughout his career, Franklin Gowen was renowned as an eloquent and persuasive speaker. A number of his orations were published and sold in pamphlet form. In an 1866 contract dispute—when Gowen was the Reading's local counsel in Pottsville—he won handily for the Reading, against its rival Pennsylvania Railroad, before the state Supreme Court, "bolster[ing] his points with legal citations, classical quotations, humorous stories, and even a toy train." Other notable instances included his closing argument as prosecutor in the 1876 murder trial of John Kehoe, vilified at the time as the "King of the Mollie Maguires," in which he portrayed the murders and other crimes attributed to Mollies as being an evil unparalleled in all human history, and as not locally motivated, but driven by orders from other places—Pittsburgh, New York—even other lands—England, Ireland, Scotland; and his three-hour argument in 1881 before a gathering of outraged stockholders of the bankrupt Reading Railroad, inside Philadelphia's Academy of Music, by which he turned open hostility into enthusiastic rounds of applause Kehoe received the death penalty and was hanged. He was later exonerated and posthumously pardoned by the State of Pennsylvania. One twentieth-century commentator described Gowen's oratory skills thus:

Even in cold print..., his speeches tend to unsettle the judgment.

By 1867, having impressed the Reading Railroad's management in Philadelphia with his legal exertions on their behalf, including the above-mentioned state Supreme Court victory over the Pennsylvania Railroad, he was invited to Philadelphia to head the corporation's legal department. Leaving Pottsville behind, Gowen sold his home to George DeBenneville Keim, a fellow attorney and close personal friend, who was to figure significantly during Gowen's future presidency of the railroad.

In 1877, he was elected as a member to the American Philosophical Society.

== Running the Philadelphia and Reading Railroad ==
=== Assuming the presidency ===
Once established in Philadelphia as chief counsel for the railroad, Gowen further gained the trust of the current president, Charles E. Smith, so that when Smith took a needed ocean voyage for his health in mid-1869, 33-year-old Gowen was put in charge upon Smith's recommendation to the Board of Managers. When Smith was unable to return for the next board election in January 1870, Gowen was elected president in his own right, a position he would occupy for more than a decade.

The Philadelphia and Reading Railroad was a regional carrier only, not a trunk line with its own through connections to Pittsburgh, Chicago and beyond, like the Pennsylvania, the Baltimore and Ohio (B&O) or the Erie railroads. Rather than a hauler of general freight and passengers, the Reading initially had been formed in the 1830s specifically for the purpose of hauling anthracite coal from Schuylkill County to Philadelphia and points between.

In the post-Civil War climate of Northern industrial growth and prosperity, the Philadelphia and Reading Railroad even prior to Gowen's presidency was involved in dual processes of consolidating control over sub-regional carriers that fed into it, by either acquisition or lease; and of building connections through other lines to Pittsburgh and beyond. Gowen, as Pottsville counsel and especially as chief counsel of the Reading, was not only aware of, but very close to these endeavors—and secret purchases of Schuylkill County coal lands, in violation of the railroad's corporate charter.

The core of the Reading's business, however, remained anthracite hauling, and as president Gowen sought to stabilize this core by obtaining control over both ends of the industry that the railroad connected: anthracite production and marketing.

=== Controlling production: quelling labor disputes in the mines ===
Gowen's drive to stabilize production began almost as soon as he became president, following a miners' strike action in the Schuylkill coal fields in 1869–70 that resulted in fluctuations of coal traffic on the Reading. The two sides in the dispute were a loose coalition of mine operators, the Anthracite Board of Trade; and a young union, the Workingmen's Benevolent Association (WBA). Both the miners and the operators were interested in manipulating the price of anthracite at market by controlling the amount produced; but they were in dispute over how fluctuations in real market prices should reflect back upon wages in the mines. Franklin Gowen was asked by the Board of Trade to mediate. This resulted in the "Gowen Compromise," a sliding-scale arrangement tying wages to the rise and fall of anthracite's market prices. This scheme was incorporated in July 1870 into the first written contract between miners and operators in the U.S. Gowen was not a disinterested party in the original dispute, however, his real concerns being to stabilize revenues for the Reading and to do so by introducing his own manipulations of anthracite prices.

So in the next mining season, when workers and operators entered into fresh disputes over the 1870 contract, he organized a loose (for the time being) combination of anthracite haulers that uniformly hiked freight rates to prohibitive levels, thereby cutting mine operators' revenues so ultimately to force the miners into accepting wages that the combination wanted.

Feelings ran so high against this, that Gowen found himself having to mount a vigorous self-defense before state legislators against what was deemed unprecedented assumption of power by a corporation. Gowen, both testifying and cross-examining other witnesses, defended himself by taking the offensive. He attacked the WBA generally, and its leader, John Siney, personally, as ignorant, demagogic, wrong-headed in their misunderstandings of the laws of supply and demand; as preventing men from working, forcing the poor to pay high prices for coal, and ruining the iron industry.

It was in these same hearings that Gowen first began to formulate in public discourse his theory that the miners' union had at its core a murderous criminal association:

This organization first came into full fledged existence, in all the [coal] regions, in 1869. They then formed the Workingmen's Benevolent association, extending throughout the entire coal fields of Pennsylvania.

I do not charge this Workingmen's Benevolent association with it, but I say there is an association which votes in secret, at night, that men's lives shall be taken, and that they shall be shot before their wives, murdered in cold blood, for daring to work against the order.... I do not blame this association, but I blame another association for doing it; and it happens that the only men who are shot are the men who dare to disobey the mandates of the Workingmen's Benevolent association.

This idea, already formed in his mind well before any pointed investigation of such a spectral secret society, Gowen was to expand and propound later in the decade into the image of an international conspiracy as the ultimate target behind the prosecution of coal-region Mollie Maguires.

=== Controlling production: the Philadelphia & Reading Coal & Iron Company ===
Unlike later-formed anthracite-hauling railroads tied to other portions of the coal region, such as the Lehigh Valley and the Delaware, Lackawanna & Western, whose corporate charters allowed them to also be involved in mining operations, the Philadelphia and Reading Railroad's charter prohibited it.

At this time in the U.S., the granting, regulation, and rescission of corporate charters were managed by the legislative rather than executive branch in most states. So adding to the allowed pursuits of the Reading by amending its charter was not a matter of simply a board decision and filing of papers. This legal obstacle to increasing the Reading's control over coal production Gowen sneaked around in 1871 by eking out, through political allies, the Pennsylvania legislature's chartering a new corporation, the Laurel Run Improvement Company, whose vaguely set-out purpose was to be involved in coal and iron, and whose shares could be purchased by "any railroad or mining company". This new company was quickly bought outright by the Reading as a subsidiary and renamed the Philadelphia & Reading Coal & Iron Company (the Coal & Iron Co). In the meantime, Gowen obtained passage through the legislature of another bill permitting the Reading Railroad to borrow an unlimited amount of money. Gowen quickly arranged for a US$25 million bond issue and sent agents to buy up Schuylkill County coal land for the Coal & Iron Co.

During the period from 1871 to 1874, Gowen's Philadelphia and Reading Railroad continued to borrow at the rate of US$16 million per year to buy up and develop Schuylkill County coal lands, including numerous existing mining operations. In a number of cases, loans were extended to foundering mine operators to keep them afloat, and Reading money was also put up to build iron furnaces along its rail lines.

==== Twin Shaft Colliery ====
In collaboration with his close friend, George deBenneville Keim—who had bought Gowen's Pottsville home in 1864, and was subsequently appointed first president of the Coal & Iron Co.—Gowen's perhaps most crucial business bet was made upon these lands: development of the Pottsville Twin Shaft Colliery. This enterprise was based on a theory of mining the Schuylkill Basin coal field promoted by Eli Bowen in his 1862 book, Coal, and the Coal Trade, where he called for "large capital" to sink two "enormously deep and permanent shafts" to a depth of two thousand feet "before a single pound of coal is allowed to be sent to market." "[W]ith night and day shifts," Bowen estimated, the shafts "could be sunk down within two or three years." Shafts once sunk, the "mining would be carried on night and day, with three eight-hour shifts." "[A]fterwards you can work it like a machine." The object of these deep diggings was to reach the famous Mammoth Vein, an undulating seam of high-quality anthracite twenty-five feet thick, projected as providing a virtually inexhaustible supply. This indeed was the shared vision and plan of Gowen and Keim from the outset of the Coal & Iron Co.

Three years into the project, however, the Mammoth Vein was estimated as still 800 feet (240 m) deeper than digging had reached. Even after the colliery became operative in 1875, its production never reached even 1/10 of its projected output 750,000 tons per year. In total, the mine operated only ten years, with a cumulative output of 275,871 tons.

==== Financing the Coal & Iron Co. ====
The aggressively expansive operations of the Coal & Iron Co., including the Twin Shaft project, required vast outlays of money, and the coal and iron operations were not returning a profit on those outlays. Rather, the source of Coal & Iron Co. funding was an increasing load of debt owed by the parent railroad: increased by US$65 million during the first five years of Gowen's presidency—almost twice the railroad's valuation when he took the helm in 1869. Annual interest on this debt, about US$4 million, was a little less than the average profit of the railroad during those years. The public face of the Reading's finances—prospectuses and annual reports—obscured these realities.

In 1874, Franklin B. Gowen came under attack again, this time charged before stockholders of accounting sleight of hand—of cloaking continuous losses in the Coal & Iron Co. by infusing into that subsidiary as "capital investment" funds borrowed by the parent railroad, only to mysteriously shuffle large portions of that "investment" back to the parent to cover high dividends paid to railroad shareholders. In light of those consistent high dividends, though, these accusations were sloughed off, and there was no shareholder revolt to derail him.

=== Controlling the anthracite markets ===
The specific destination of coal bound to Philadelphia was that city's Port Richmond area along the Delaware River. In this complex of rail yards and wharves, coal was unloaded for local marketing or for transshipment by boat to other markets such as New York and Boston. In the late 1840s and early 1850s, one of Gowen's predecessors as president of the Philadelphia & Reading, John Tucker, undertook to bolster the railroad's presence and control in Port Richmond with the aim of achieving unquestioned leadership of the coal trade on the Delaware. The Reading's Port Richmond facilities in 1852 were estimated to comprise 49 acres (200,000 m^{2}), including 20 wharves that would allow more than 100 vessels to be loaded simultaneously, and space for storage in slack times of a quarter million tons of coal.

Franklin Gowen endeavored to improve upon the benefits to the Philadelphia and Reading Railroad of this shipping terminus / transshipping hub. In 1871–72, he undertook to undermine business of the competing independent coal dealers in the area—known as "factors"—by setting up a new sales organization under the auspices of the Coal & Iron Co. Gowen's aim was not only to market the Reading organization's coal, but that of other mine operators whose output the railroad hauled, as well.

Depicting the factors, who sold typically at commissions of 20 to 25 cents a ton, as sitting "at the water's edge like leeches, sucking the life-blood of a healthy trade," he offered to operators who previously marketed through the factors to sell their coal at only 10 cents per ton. A number of operators found the proposal immediately agreeable. But Gowen's next move was not as well received: he offered to consolidate under the Coal & Iron Co. the sales businesses of fifteen factors who also owned their own mining operations. This proposal rebuffed, Gowen moved to shut down the businesses of independent factors (who did not have their own mines) by denying them continued wharf room at Port Richmond.

The public controversies stirred up by all these actions lasted into 1873. Rising above it all, in January of that year Gowen presided over formation of the "coal pool" or "anthracite combination"—including other big coal executives Asa Packer, Thomas Dickson, George Hoyt, and Samuel Sloan—which established "the first industry-wide price-fixing agreement in America." It both set the sales price for coal and allotted the tonnage each member railroad was allowed to haul to market for the coming year.

This anthracite combination fared well, even with the onset of a national depression following the Panic of 1873. In anticipation of lagging demand for coal in 1874, a long, formal agreement was put in place to enforce regulation of the trade more effectively. Some coal operators remained outside the coal pool, and for these the Reading Railroad devised a new annoyance: continuing to load coal cars with Coal & Iron Co. anthracite even beyond the Reading's allotted tonnage, then lining these loaded cars on side tracks, thus limiting the availability of empty cars for hauling the other mine operators' output. The result was haphazard disruption of production and sales for these operators.

Once again, in 1875, Franklin Gowen was called before an investigative committee, for issues raised by his role and actions in another miners' strike (the "Long Strike"—see below), and more substantially for his high-handed maneuverings in the coal trade. Even the legality of the 1871 charter of the Laurel Run Improvement Company and the Reading Railroad's transformation of that shell into the powerful Coal & Iron Co. were assailed. The investigating legislators' final report was fully in Gowen's favor. Also as in other instances, Gowen's orations were broadcast in pamphlet form and in newspaper advertisements.

=== "Long Strike" and Mollie Maguires ===
The "Gowen Compromise" of 1870 did not end strife over wages and other conditions in the coal region. Neither did the imposition of wages through the anthracite combination's exerting control over coal prices at market. Neither, to be certain, were mining disputes the beginning or end of labor upheavals in America in the 1870s.

As noted above, in the 1871 legislative investigation of coal field agitations and the Reading, Gowen portrayed the WBA as having at its core a murderous, secret association. In his 1875 testimony before another investigative committee, he characterized this same core of the union as "Communists."

In September 1873, the failure of Jay Cooke & Co. precipitated first the Panic of 1873 and in its wake the worst U.S. financial depression up to that time, which resonated with the concurrent transatlantic Long Depression. Initially, northeastern U.S. anthracite markets were not badly affected, largely due to controls put in place by Gowen's coal pool. In 1874, in addition to shoring up this coal pool's internal checks to make sure all members played by the rules, Gowen also organized Schuylkill County's independent coal operators into the Schuylkill Coal Exchange. By autumn 1874 it was common knowledge that these operators (including the Coal & Iron Co.) were intent upon precipitating a ruinous miners' strike by which to destroy the WBA (by this time renamed the Miners and Laborers Benevolent Association, or M&LBA). Such a strike was indeed brought about by severe slashes in wages offered to miners (20% cut) and mine laborers (10% cut). Known as the "Long Strike", the work stoppage lasted through June 1875, ending in the collapse of the union.

In October 1873, Gowen met in Philadelphia with Allan Pinkerton. Pinkerton's published account of the meeting depicts Gowen laying out in some detail the existence, background and nature of a criminal secret society called Mollie Maguires, transplanted from Ireland to the coal region of Pennsylvania.

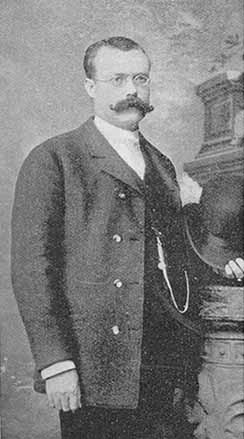
James McParland who infiltrated the Molly Maguires for the Pinkerton Agency.

Pinkerton's detective agency was already an established presence in the coal fields, having been active supervising the Coal and Iron Police, a private police force authorized by the state of Pennsylvania in 1865, paid for by railroad, mining and iron interests. Pinkerton was glad to take on additional work for the Reading Railroad.

One of his detectives, James McParland, infiltrated what he testified was the Mollies' innermost circle and provided, as a surprise witness, what proved to be damning evidence in several murder trials.

A series of murders July and September 1875, following the breakdown of the WBA and its Long Strike, led to several arrests over the next year of men identified as Mollie Maguires. Arrests, trials, convictions and hangings of Mollie Maguires occurred in the adjoining counties of Schuylkill and Carbon, in 1876–78. Catholics were excluded from juries. Gowen himself acted as special prosecutor in more than one trial in Schuylkill, most notably in 1876 at that of John "Black Jack" Kehoe, whom he characterized in his summation as "chief conspirator, murderer, and villain" and "with having made money by his traffic in the souls of his fellow-men". In this same summation he speculated that had detective McParland had one more year to complete his undercover investigation, the jury "would have had the pleasure ... of hanging some men who are not citizens of Schuylkill county," such as "the head of this order at Pittsburg, and ... its head in New York"; and suggested further that the ultimate source and directive force behind the secret order would have been found in England, Ireland and Scotland.

Kehoe was initially tried and convicted of conspiracy, and subsequently of a murder that had occurred during Gowen's term as District Attorney—despite another man's signed admission of guilt for the murder. Kehoe was posthumously pardoned by Pennsylvania Governor Milton Shapp in 1979.

Controversial at the time, circumstances and events surrounding both the Long Strike and the Mollie Maguire prosecutions and hangings have grown even more so with the passage of time. Gowen's multi-faceted role in particular—from his 1871 and 1875 testimonies positing a Mollie-like criminal enterprise at the heart of the WBA, which he also rhetorically linked to Communism; to the coincidental timing of the hopeless Long Strike precipitated by the Schuylkill Coal Exchange that Gowen had organized, on one hand, and his bankrolling the undercover anti-Mollie machinations, on the other; plus partially substantiated claims that McParland or other Pinkertons essentially on the Reading Railroad payroll instigated both Mollie-like activities and anti-Mollie vigilantism—has eluded historical consensus.

=== Wiggans Patch Massacre ===
On December 10, 1875, 20 year old pregnant Ellen O'Donnell McAllister was awakened by a strange noise at 3 a.m. She woke up her husband telling him of the noise. At this time, around 20 masked men kicked in the door and started firing in the house. As Ellen walked down the steps, she was shot at point blank range. She and her unborn baby were murdered, along with her brother, Charles O'Donell. The matriarch of the house, Margaret O'Donnell, was pistol whipped by the assailants and they roughed up the boarders Mrs. O'Donnell kept. Ellen's husband, Charles McAllister, managed to escape, as did James O'Donnell, another O'Donnell sibling, and James McAllister, brother of Ellen's husband, Charles. It was said the attack occurred because the O'Donnell family were suspected members of the Molly Maguires. Ellen's body and that of her brother were taken to Tamaqua by train. Upon arrival, the corpses were packed in ice and stored overnight in the train station to await burial at old St. Jerome's Cemetery. Ellen's sister, Mary Ann, was married to the John "Black Jack" Kehoe, who history dubbed "The King of the Molly Maguires".

In recent years, documents and communications have emerged between Franklin Gowen, Allan Pinkerton, and the captain of the Coal and Iron Police, Captain Linden, which strongly suggest that this tragic event was not only premeditated but executed with precision. Furthermore, documents show that funding for the massacre was provided by coal and railroad money and some sources say that billionaire Asa Packer may have fronted a good portion of the financial backing.

=== Great Strike of 1877 ===
During Franklin Gowen's presidency, the Reading Railroad was one of the richest corporations in the world—running not only trains, but an empire of coal mines, of canals and oceangoing vessels; and even trying (unsuccessfully) a subsidiary rail venture in Brazil. Though its corporate management resided in Philadelphia, the motive power propelling the railroad emanated from Reading, roughly 60 miles (97 km) northwest of the larger city, where a 36-acre (150,000 m^{2}) engineering/production shop complex sat adjacent to the downtown. Disputes between the Reading and laborers embroiled not only miners in the Coal & Iron division, but engineers and other workers in the Railroad division as well. Both the Reading Railroad and its namesake city were fertile grounds for early unionization. In particular, the city of Reading was throughout the 1870s home to a very motivated local of the Brotherhood of Locomotive Engineers (the BLE). Gowen's crushing of the WBA, coupled with his widely hailed unraveling of the Mollie Maguires, heartened railroad capitalists nationwide. His triumphs refreshed their confidence that unionism could be squashed altogether. This impression of Gowen's prowess against unions was reinforced by his moves to quell a BLE strike in Reading in April 1877. Having learned from spies of a strike about to happen, Gowen issued an ultimatum: leave the union, or be fired. Nearly 80 per cent of the railroad's engineers walked off the job. Bosses and other non-union employees were pressed into service to run the trains until "temporary" replacements (i.e., strikebreakers) could be hired on. The New York Times hailed the destruction of the "dictatorial" BLE and encouraged "employers generally" to imitate Gowen's anti-union stance.

Throughout the spring of 1877, heads of the four major U.S. trunk lines — the B&O, the New York Central, the Erie and the Pennsylvania — held meetings to determine how, by working together, they could all "earn more and … spend less". The initial fruits of these meetings was a freight pooling arrangement along lines similar to Gowen's anthracite combination, to increase revenues by reducing competition. They also determined that, after Gowen's defeating the BLE, a reduction in rail workers' wages was timely. The Pennsylvania was the first of the four to act, announcing an across-the-board wage cut of 10 per cent, effective June 1, 1877. Cuts on other roads — not just the four trunk lines — followed, affecting rail workers nationwide. The B&O's 10 per cent cut precipitated, in July 1877, a work stoppage in Martinsburg, West Virginia, which multiplied with telegraphic speed into the Great Railroad Strike of 1877. The Great Strike flashed from coast to coast; workers on railroad after railroad, in city after city, struck as well, forcing a halt to all rail activity in or through numerous locales, and in some places triggering general non-railroad work stoppages. Interstate commerce was paralyzed for weeks. As the Strike spread, destructive and deadly violence erupted in some major cities — Baltimore; Pittsburgh, Reading and Scranton, Pennsylvania; Buffalo, Chicago, and San Francisco. Almost immediately upon his return from Europe, on the very day the Great Strike broke out, Gowen instituted massive layoffs of brakemen across the railroad, in effect both sanctioning and reinforcing the other railroads' moves while he was gone. In Reading, back in April and May, striking BLE engineers had been quickly displaced by strikebreakers and then blacklisted—but the strikebreakers, as well as other workers, were not paid by the cash-strapped Reading Railroad from May through mid-July. While the Great Strike gathered momentum, Gowen found the money to pay back wages in Reading. Local outrage at Gowen and the Reading was intensified as newly laid-off brakemen swelled the ranks of unemployed railroad men and strikebreakers saw their wages as a transparent effort to buy loyalty.

Ultimately, within a month of the first Mollie Maguire hangings (June 20, 1877), the ongoing BLE strike in Reading, which Gowen believed he had broken just as he had the WBA strike in 1875, gained fresh momentum from the unfolding Great Strike; tensions in the city escalated until, on July 23, 10 citizens were killed by the Pennsylvania state militia in the Reading Railroad Massacre. Federal troops were dispatched to Reading to restore order. Following the Massacre, in October 1877 Gowen personally prosecuted men whom Pinkerton spies had pinpointed as the local BLE ringleaders, but they were acquitted.

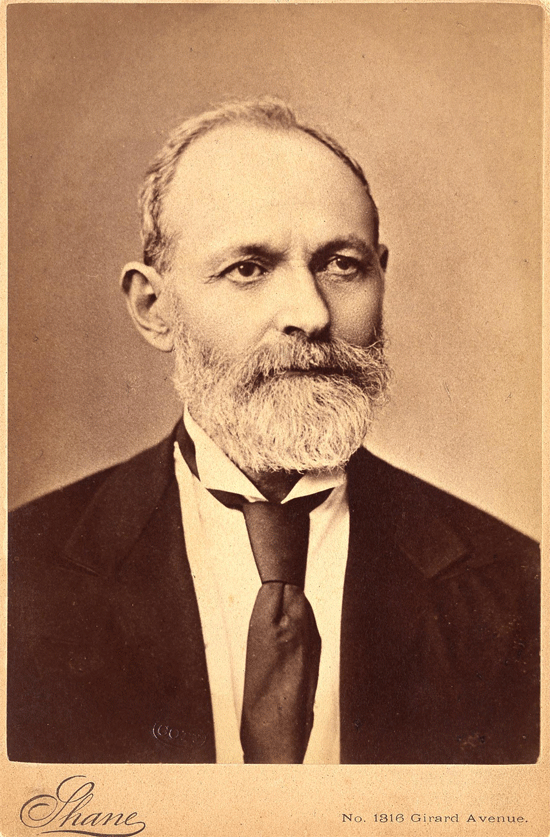
Uriah S. Stephens, founder of the Knights of Labor

Three months later, in January 1878, Reading was the site of the first national convention of the Knights of Labor, which grew into one of the important U.S. labor organizations of the nineteenth century. As with many early labor organizations, its membership rolls and meetings were secret, to help avoid infiltration and blacklisting. The Knights creed and organization crossed occupational lines, attempting to become a sort of "union of unions." As such, after the collapse of the WBA/M&LBA, miners in the anthracite region formed locals of the Knights of Labor. In one incident, when Coal & Iron Co. workers struck for back pay, Gowen once again raised the issue of terrorism. Seeking to avert the spread of the strike, he sent an open letter to the Miner's Journal newspaper in Pottsville exposing the names of the officers and membership of the Knights assemblies. He also implied that there was a "gang" within the union, similar to the Mollies, whose task was to sabotage coal company property. The Knights fought back by challenging the Schuylkill County authorities to arrest the alleged terrorists, but as Gowen's charges were unsubstantiated, the matter went no further.

=== Bankruptcies and ouster from the Reading ===
==== Reading Railroad's first bankruptcy ====
The United States was roiled repeatedly throughout the nineteenth century by financial panics and resultant economic recessions, each with transatlantic dimensions. The Panic of 1837 was pivotal for the Reading Railroad. After the road's optimistic startup on a foundation of American capital in 1834, because it was "constructed without financial stint... the income from the company's operations had to be maintained at an unusually high level just to stay in the black." During the American economic contraction following the 1837 panic, management turned in desperation to London for fresh capital and credit. The resulting influx of badly needed cash made the Reading the first American railroad to come under direct English influence as to its management. From well prior to Gowen's presidency, and continuing through it until the Reading Railroad came fully under J.P. Morgan's sway, these London interests exerted great influence.

The Reading better weathered the panics of 1847 and 1857, but under Franklin Gowen's management and expansionist programs, the Panic of 1873 and its follow-on depression were once again of instrumental importance. The railroad fell deeper and deeper into debt until, finally, in May 1880, the well was dry: the Reading had gone bankrupt.

Despite the harsh realities of the depression that ran from late 1873 into 1879, it was significant misjudgments on Gowen's part that led to the Reading Railroad's collapse in 1880. His determination to dominate, through the Reading Railroad, the overall supply/demand dynamic of anthracite was hemmed in by insurmountable bounds from the outset.

The mining theory behind the ultimately wasteful development of the Pottsville Twin Shaft operation was not well grounded in the geologic science even of that time. But that theory alone did not make up Gowen's rationale for the massive expenditures of the Coal & Iron Co. He believed that the Schuylkill Valley—which from colonial times until the Civil War had been the center of American iron-making—would, because of the importance of anthracite iron, continue to hold that preeminent position indefinitely. He stated this belief forthrightly in the Reading Railroad annual report for 1870; but already the use of lower-cost coke made from more widely available bituminous coal, together with expanding markets in the Midwest and West, was driving the center of the iron industry (and soon, steelmaking) to Pittsburgh. Already the importance of anthracite as an indispensable industrial fuel was slipping.

Even Gowen's anthracite combination, successful at maintaining profitable market prices even as depression set in, was not able to continue long in unity. Internecine squabbles and continued deteriorating business conditions all around undermined the effectiveness of this pooling effort, and coal prices and revenues fluctuated year by year. The combination unraveled in August 1876, with Gowen angrily denouncing erstwhile coal pool member Asa Packer by name. Meanwhile, earlier in the year the Coal & Iron Company's retail marketing operation at Port Richmond was transferred to an independent concern. As the Philadelphia coal market continued to decline, Schuylkill County mine operators sent Thomas Baumgardner, who had given Franklin Gowen his first introduction to the coal and iron businesses during his apprenticeship, as part of a committee to get a read on Gowen's intentions. Still out of sorts over the larger anthracite combination's falling apart, Gowen would not commit to any new price-fixing arrangement.

Finally, Gowen did not well discern the special nature of the Reading, as compared to other railroads of the time, in terms of its underlying capitalization. As noted above, the road was "constructed without financial stint"; specifically, it was laid out at a cost per mile that far exceeded that of other lines in the coal region, or even of such trunk lines as the B&O and Erie. Carrying costs for this capitalization was the issue that first drove the Reading into the arms of English lenders and investors. Somewhat a relief on both sides of the Atlantic, then, was the period 1861–1867, when the railroad managed to cut its funded debt roughly in half—from $11,819,400 to $5,902,300.

This was the fiscally sound, but still burdened, Reading Railroad whose presidency Gowen assumed in 1869. Instead of gleaning insight from the railroad's successful struggle to bring its overhead under control, he turned the enterprise in the following decade into a mysteriously accounted borrowing machine. In 1874, a former Gowen friend turned enemy by Gowen's organization of the anthracite industry, accused Gowen in print of dishonest and misleading financial representations in the Reading's annual report and its prospectuses. Though Gowen was able to easily slough off such accusation at that time, it was renewed more powerfully in 1876 by Charles E. Smith—Gowen's direct predecessor as president, who had recommended the young man for the position in his absence. Even following Gowen's election to the post in his own right, Smith had remained on the corporation's Board of Managers. After hearing from Gowen of a US$7 million floating debt that had never been discussed in any board meetings, Smith inspected the unpublished books of the subsidiary Coal & Iron Co., which issued no annual report of its own. He found that the parent corporation's floating debt was being transferred to the subsidiary before the parent's fiscal year end in November, to avoid appearing in year-end statements; only to be shifted back to the parent prior to the subsidiary's own fiscal year end in December, thus effectively masking the joint enterprise's precarious condition overall. Smith raised the issue to the Reading's principal source of funds, the McCalmont Brothers investment banking firm in London, seeking Gowen's ouster, but was rebuffed. Though Gowen remained as president, and Smith resigned from the board, the incident forced Gowen's 1876 annual report to approximate frankness. It indicated the corporation's funded debt as US$65 million, resulting in US$5.5 million annually in carrying charges, compared to just over US$3 million in earnings for the railroad and a US$600,000 loss for the Coal & Iron Co.

From that time, through fresh sanguine predictions for improvements in the business climate and the Reading's overall performance, which allowed him to borrow more funds on a less grand scale and to get the McCalmonts to defer interest payments due; and maneuverings such as periodically paying workers in scrip—essentially promissory notes—instead of cash, Franklin Gowen continued to run the Reading. In early 1880, employees were paid in cash for the first time in sixteen months. Then, on Friday, May 22, 1880, two Coal & Iron Co. checks, intended to transfer cash to the railroad, bounced. Gowen offered railroad promissory notes to make the checks good, but the bank turned him down. McCalmont Brothers ignored Gowen's plea by cable for a fresh loan of a half million dollars. That same day the Reading announced suspension of payments on debt.

Reading Railroad stock dropped from 23 to 12½ in one hour of trading. An anonymous statement from the corporate offices predicted resumption of payments in thirty days, without bankruptcy. Ex-president Smith, however, predicted that the company had "no future but bankruptcy, and it must get rid of Mr. Gowen, or bankruptcy won't help it. Should he be made receiver, it will be the same old story."

The following Monday, a formal declaration of bankruptcy was filed at the U.S. Circuit Court in Pittsburgh. Franklin Gowen was appointed as one of three receivers; the others were Philadelphia bankers with no personal ties to the corporation.

==== Contentious recovery, new expansionism ====
Though Gowen's powers as president were eclipsed by the appointment of receivers, his position as the one receiver who had close knowledge of the overall operations of the combined rail and coal businesses placed him in the middle of revitalization efforts. However, his hitherto support from the McCalmont Brothers banking concern was about to unravel through a series of discords into downright enmity. The McCalmonts owned at the time two-thirds of the Reading's stock and half of its bonds, and they formed their own committee to look after the interests of (especially British) bondholders. Initially this committee, chaired by a former Lord Chancellor, approved with reservations Gowen's inclusion as a receiver on the bases that "[t]he proprietors of the bonds and stocks of the company in America have evinced their satisfaction with the choice of receivers," and that his "action... as receiver will be controlled by his colleagues and by the court."

Before any concrete planning to regain solvency could be undertaken, an accurate accounting of the railroad's condition was required. The receivers' report, issued in June 1880, indicated total liabilities of US$145,494,005. Annual carrying charges were just over US$7.5 million, while net revenues were just under US$5.5 million. Already, this early into the process, the English bondholders' committee contended that expansions in the Reading's floating debt incurred during the six months prior to the bankruptcy were not covered by value in the corporation's assets.

Three plans of reorganization were put forth before the end of 1880. The first came from the McCalmont faction; the second from a former vice president of the Reading; and the third from Franklin Gowen. The McCalmont plan would have given preferred protection to senior mortgage bond holders and also would have put a levy upon stockholders, US$15 per share, towards substantially paying down floating debt. The second plan did away with the levy—heavily objected to by American shareholders—but was contingent for success upon the Reading's preferred stock being worth roughly four times its current trading value. The third plan was put forth by Franklin Gowen in the context of known contemplation by the English bondholders of exercising their right of foreclosure against the Reading. Gowen's plan called for receivership to last for five years, for which time he projected increasingly improved business performance, reduction of fixed expenses to a manageable level, and liquidation of floating debt by the selling off of assets and/or conversion into preferred stock. This plan, as put forth to the McCalmonts, was accompanied by Gowen's offer to step aside as receiver. The English faction agreed to a plan very close to Gowen's, but with the stipulation that Gowen should indeed be replaced as receiver by someone not involved in the corporation's management prior to the bankruptcy. Gowen backpedaled vigorously.

He still held the positions of receiver and president, and had the confidence generally of the corporate board and of many American investors. In late 1880 Gowen traveled to England to attempt repairing relations there, and at the same time sought to postpone the annual shareholder meeting, with its election of president and board, from its regular January schedule. Through cross litigation by the Reading board and the McCalmonts the postponement was realized, and then Gowen began a campaign to get American shareholders to not attend the meeting. His argument to them was that the Reading was in danger of undermining influences from rival railroads but his hope was that the postponement would change the voting rules, and the absence of his allied shareholders would prevent a qualified quorum from being present. When the meeting was finally held in March 1881, however, and the McCalmont-dominated voting resulted in election of a different president and board from Gowen and his associates, Gowen resorted to new litigation. State and federal courts ruled against him, though, and he grudgingly gave access to the corporate offices to his temporary successor, Frank S. Bond — although in surrendering the physical office, Gowen retained possession of the company records. It was at this point that Gowen hired the Philadelphia Academy of Music for the purpose of addressing stockholders, as well as Philadelphia's political and business leaders. His three-hour oration not only excoriated the McCalmont Brothers' "cowardly meanness", but accused them and their American agents, Kidder, Peabody, of working in league with the Pennsylvania Railroad in order to attempt moving the Reading into the sphere of control of that much larger corporation. This oration was interrupted frequently by applause, but did not affect Gowen's removal from the presidency.

No longer president, Gowen was still a receiver, and from that position he continued to lobby for his reorganization plan to stockholders, to the McCalmonts, and even to the new president. President Bond, however, was lobbying for his own new plan of reorganization, and things remained at somewhat of a standstill in that regard. On another front, however, Gowen was maneuvering to regain the presidency, and toward that end he forged a pivotal alliance with William Vanderbilt, president of the New York Central and other railroads. Vanderbilt bought up a large block of Reading Railroad stock, sufficient to reelect Gowen as president in January 1882. The same annual meeting saw resolutions passed approving Gowen's reorganization plan and requiring the incoming board of managers to put that plan into effect.

In response to this turn of events, McCalmont Brothers liquidated its holdings in the Reading and withdrew from ongoing litigation. The forty-year predominance of English capital in the finances and affairs of the Reading Railroad was thus ended; but in exchange the company's future became a fresh, inviting target for opportunistic American capital. In 1881 and 1882 the Coal & Iron Co. continued to register losses, but the railroad actually saw upturns in its passenger, coal and merchandise freight business lines. Austerity measures implemented early in the bankruptcy at the railroad's car production and repair shops in Reading now found these operations taxed to their limits. Rather than rehabilitate these units, though, Gowen put money into building diverse new stations as well as a million-bushel grain elevator at Port Richmond. He also moved to expand the Reading Railroad's scope by having it lease the Central Railroad of New Jersey (the Jersey Central). Vanderbilt supported the move as it would increase the value of his own railroad's interconnection at New York Harbor. Ominously, the Jersey Central was at the time in receivership, and the deal included assumption by Gowen's Reading of the Jersey Central's US$2 million of floating debt and guaranteeing a 6% dividend on all of the Central's stock then outstanding.

Next, Gowen and Vanderbilt hit upon a plan to turn the Reading into a trunk line by building new extensions: two from Williamsport: one to Buffalo and one to northwestern Pennsylvania's soft coal region in Clearfield County; a third, in collaboration with the B&O, that would form a direct line from Washington, DC through Philadelphia to New York; and most ambitiously a fourth — the so-called South Penn line — that would extend the Reading's western reach from Harrisburg to Pittsburgh. They formed a syndicate including steelmakers Andrew Carnegie, Henry Oliver, Henry Clay Frick, Pennsylvania career politician J. Donald Cameron, and—paradoxically, given Gowen's longstanding litigious hostility to Standard Oil — John D. and William Rockefeller. Operating in the atmosphere of improved business conditions generally, the Reading Railroad emerged from receivership in February 1883.

That year witnessed continued improvement in the Reading's rail businesses, and in his annual report at the end of the year, Gowen made glowing predictions of prosperity for the road overall, including its new expansionist endeavors. "The company has now surmounted the difficulties of the last four eventful years", Gowen proclaimed; but that was not an accurate assessment of all the facts. Nevertheless, President Gowen seized the moment of high praise from American shareholders for "rescuing our property from bankruptcy against the malignant and determined efforts of its enemies and conspirators to foreclose and wreck it", to remove himself from the official duties and pressures of president. At the January 1884 annual meeting he resigned in favor of his recommended successor, George deBenneville Keim, his close friend and associate since their days as young attorneys in Pottsville. Gowen's resignation was over the objections of his ally and friend, William Vanderbilt; but the former assured the recent investor in the Reading that the nature of his relationship with Keim would assure his close involvement in all matters related to running the company.

The same meeting that elected Keim authorized a new US$12 million loan issue to pay the recently increased floating debt and the balance due on the Jersey Central deal. It considered a proposal from Gowen of paying out a 21% dividend on preferred stock, in case the loan issue should be successfully placed. However, in spite of President Gowen's glowing predictions at the end of calendar year 1883, "[s]carcely any of the benefits of [his] plan of reorganization had been secured; fixed charges had not been reduced, because it had been impossible to get creditors to take new securities in exchange for the old, and equally impossible to sell any considerable amount of the new securities for cash.

While old charges had remained unabated, new charges had been added ... and the very gain in earnings which might have been construed as favorable was due to increased mileage [i.e., expansion of the Reading system], and was not proportional to the growth of the system." An additional immediate legacy of the second Gowen expansionist presidency was the payment in company scrip for labor and supplies in May 1884 and an accompanying new fall in the value of Reading Railroad securities. On June 2, 1884, although Gowen was no longer president of the Reading, the company again passed as a direct result of his adventuristic management into bankruptcy and the hands of receivers, including this time not Gowen but his hand-picked successor as president, George deB. Keim.

Before Keim's election as president, Franklin Gowen had assured his friend, William Vanderbilt, that "on account of the relations existing between Mr. Keim and myself ... I can control the Reading...." However the new management, under Keim, in fact was not keen to continue Gowen's affiliation with the company at all. Following a confrontation between the two old friends, in which Gowen was told (by his own later recounting) "you were not a very successful president of this company, and now other people have got hold of it; we are responsible and you are not"; Gowen's hyperbolic response eventually obtained him a position as counsel, allowing him to offer advice but make no decisions.

Throughout 1884 and into 1885, Gowen jockeyed and jostled to make his way back into active management of the Reading, but with no real headway. A hidden roadblock to all his efforts was that management was attempting to obtain fresh financing through the Philadelphia firm of Drexel and Company. It was clear that these conservative financiers—including a not yet well known partner, J.P. Morgan—would have inevitably turned away from any such dealing if Franklin Gowen were managerially involved in the Reading. These matters were further complicated by tightening business conditions in those two years. Vanderbilt's alliance with Gowen had begun as part of a campaign by his New York Central against the Pennsylvania Railroad, and both of these trunk lines were feeling the pinch of hard times. Morgan felt the pinch as well in the form of poor performance from his New York Central share holdings.

Morgan then began a campaign of his own to bring peace—that is, an amicable reduction of profit-destroying competition—between the two trunk lines. In the working out of this peace, Gowen's erstwhile syndicate for constructing the South Penn line that would turn the Reading into a viably competitive trunk line was undermined entirely, leaving little prospect of completing that project. Ultimately, significant portions of the South Penn's right of way and partly completed gradings lay fallow until they were eventually utilized in the 1930s for construction of the Pennsylvania Turnpike.

==== Gowen's ouster ====
Gowen planned and undertook in November 1885 a new campaign to regain control of the Reading. He published a plan that included having himself reappointed as a receiver, raising new millions of dollars, holding on to the Jersey Central (whose lease by the Reading was in jeopardy through litigation), and even to complete the elusive attainment of trunk line status for the railroad. In December, once again he rented the Philadelphia Academy of Music, which filled to standing room capacity to hear his three-hour oration denouncing present management and its willfully ignoring his advice on how to save the company, as well as the present receivers' reorganization plan.

In place of these, Gowen proposed his own reorganization plan based, one more time, upon optimistic earnings estimates and his ability to attract new money into the company. Also, one more time, his oration carried the audience into great enthusiasm. Such was the momentum generated by Gowen's overall campaign that Keim conceded the January 1886 presidential election in advance; Gowen and his Board of Managers slate were elected unanimously and adopted a resolution calling for a change in the receivership. Notwithstanding the optimistic reorganization plan Gowen rode back into the presidency, shareholder enthusiasm and a board resolution were insufficient to remove the Reading from its deeply troubled circumstance. Before Gowen was able to mobilize any of the money required to take action, Morgan reentered the arena, this time heading a syndicate that offered to return peace and prosperity to the company through a different means. An anonymous member of Morgan's syndicate described a central element of the proposed peace:

In order to do this it has been found necessary to get rid of Mr. Gowen. We have all combined to get him out of railroad management, just as all the powers of Europe combined to crush Napoleon, and there will be no peace until Mr. Gowen is in St. Helena. He is an able and brilliant man and in some respects a veritable Napoleon, but he is no railroad manager.... The trouble with Mr. Gowen is that he wants to be fighting all the time. When he was after the Molly Maguires he was in his element, but as a railroad manager he is a failure.

This syndicate proposed its reorganization plan to the sitting receivers, who decided to cooperate towards putting it into effect. Gowen immediately attempted to put together his own syndicate, but this failed to bear sufficient fruit. Through a series of maneuverings with associates and erstwhile Gowen friends and allies, as well as minor changes to its original proposal, Morgan's group was able to win Gowen over — even to the provision requiring that he step down, once and for all, as president of the Reading Railroad. His resignation was effective September 17, 1886.

== Life after the railroad ==
Gowen never completely gave up the practice of law. A notable instance was during the run up to the Reading's May 1880 bankruptcy: in March Gowen was in Harrisburg prosecuting bribery cases on behalf of the state of Pennsylvania, growing out of the state's Railroad Riots Act investigations, and from Gowen's perspective an extension of his ongoing legal wranglings against the allied activities of the Pennsylvania Railroad and Standard Oil. Gowen was president of the Reading Railroad and also had a history of involvement in civic matters. He had been a Democratic representative to the state constitutional convention in 1873 and had been a board of governors member of the Philadelphia Reform Club. As well, also in the run up to the railroad's 1880 bankruptcy, he had lent his name in support of one side of a fight for control of the state Democratic convention. At another point during his presidency his name was rumored as a possible Democratic candidate for Pennsylvania governor. In his forced retirement from the active affairs of the Reading, Gowen spent time composing limericks and also translating German poetry. Involvement with literature was not new to him — recall his founding role in the Pottsville Literary Society decades before; and he was well versed enough in the stage to include lengthy descriptions of two plays in his speech at one of the Molly Maguire trials.

Despite the enforced peace introduced by J.P. Morgan among formerly cutthroat competing railroads, Gowen found opportunity to wage legal war against his old enemies, the Standard Oil and Pennsylvania Railroad, before the then new Interstate Commerce Commission (ICC). Early in 1889, he found himself in the odd position of representing an old friend, Eckley B. Coxe, in a suit before the ICC against, essentially, the same coal monopoly that Gowen himself had forged more than a decade before. Shortly before his death, many of Gowen's friends and associates noticed a change in his overall mood. They remarked upon his more somber demeanor and noted that for a trip home to Philadelphia, he had boarded the wrong train. Gowen wrote to his insurance agent on December 9, 1889, to ask if he could cash in his $90,000 life insurance policy. Three days later, after he had arrived in Washington, D.C., to argue a case before the Interstate Commerce Commission, Gowen purchased a revolver at a hardware store on Pennsylvania Avenue.

== Death ==
It was determined that Franklin B. Gowen died from a self-inflicted gunshot wound to the head on December 13, 1889, at Wormley's Hotel in Washington, D.C. At the time, some had speculated that he was murdered by Molly Maguires in retaliation. However, the Gowen family hired Captain Robert Linden of the Pinkerton Agency to investigate. Linden had been the senior Pinkerton involved in the Reading Co. and thus considered qualified to determine if there were any connection of that sort. Linden ruled out a Molly connection very quickly. The owner of Wolford's Hardware Store on Pennsylvania Avenue came forward to identify Gowen as the man who had bought a pistol the day before. Conspiracy theories about assassins and impersonations were put aside when the Gowen family reported that he had been "acting queerly for some time and that there was a strain of hereditary insanity in his family." Though baseless in light of contemporary investigations, sensationalists and conspiracy theorists periodically resurrect the controversy as to whether his death was suicide or homicide.

Simply put, [Gowen] turn[ed] the company from one of economic conservatism to daring adventurism. Every aspect of the [Reading Co.]'s existence was to be enervated and agitated and sometimes turned topsy-turvy during the Gowen years of the 1870s and 1880s.

The few scraps of letters and memoranda from Gowen that shed some light on this seem to indicate that he was impatient, even bored, when details of real railroading practices came to his attention. It was corporate power and financial finagling that interested this complex man. . . . Gowen's financial rewards were meager, and while he did attain considerable public attention and the trappings of his office, this dynamic leader ultimately was consumed by his final failure and his career ended in tragedy.

== Notes ==
Preceded by Charles E. Smith	President of the Philadelphia and Reading Railroad; 1866–1883	Succeeded by Frank S. Bond
