= Jacksonport, Arkansas =

- Town
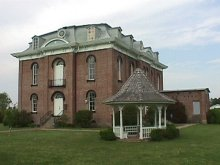
- Historic courthouse in Jacksonport

- Location of Jacksonport in Jackson County, Arkansas.
- Coordinates: 35°38′32″N 91°18′28″W
- Country: United States
- State: Arkansas
- County: Jackson

Area
  - Total: 0.37 sq mi (0.97 km^{2})
  - Land: 0.37 sq mi (0.97 km^{2})
  - Water: 0 sq mi (0.00 km^{2})
- Elevation: 223 ft (68 m)

Population (2020)
  - Total: 150
  - Estimate (2025): 148 ▼
  - Density: 398.8/sq mi (153.97/km^{2})
- Time zone: UTC-6 (Central (CST))
  - Summer (DST): UTC-5 (CDT)
- ZIP code: 72075
- Area code: 870
- FIPS code: 05-34720
- GNIS feature ID: 2405901

Jacksonport is a town in Jackson County, Arkansas, United States, along the White River at its confluence with the Black River. As of the 2020 census, Jacksonport had a population of 150.

== History ==
Jacksonport was once an important steamboat stop on the White River. During the Civil War the town served as a transportation hub for Confederate forces.

Jacksonport was the terminus of the Batesville and Brinkley Railroad, later called the White and Black River Valley Railway, which reached the town from Brinkley, Arkansas in November 1886. The line was subsequently operated by the Chicago, Rock Island and Pacific Railway until closed in 1940.

== Geography ==
Jacksonport is located at 35°38′28″N 91°18′32″W (35.640990, -91.308860).

According to the United States Census Bureau, the town has a total area of 0.35 square miles (0.9 km^{2}), all land.

== Demographics ==
Historical population
Census	Pop.	Note	%±
1870	769		—
1880	656		−14.7%
1890	421		−35.8%
1900	265		−37.1%
1910	373		40.8%
1930	196		—
1940	215		9.7%
1970	306		—
1980	288		−5.9%
1990	264		−8.3%
2000	235		−11.0%
2010	212		−9.8%
2020	150		−29.2%
2025 (est.)	148	▼	−1.3%
U.S. Decennial Census

As of the census of 2000, there were 235 people, 104 households, and 66 families residing in the town. The population density was 252.0 people/km^{2} (653 people/mi^{2}). There were 114 housing units at an average density of 122.3 units/km^{2} (317 units/mi^{2}). The racial makeup of the town was 94.47% White, 2.98% Black or African American, 0.43% Native American, and 2.13% from two or more races.

There were 104 households, out of which 25.0% had children under the age of 18 living with them, 49.0% were married couples living together, 9.6% had a female householder with no husband present, and 36.5% were non-families. 29.8% of all households were made up of individuals, and 11.5% had someone living alone who was 65 years of age or older. The average household size was 2.26 and the average family size was 2.83.

In the town, the population was spread out, with 20.0% under the age of 18, 10.6% from 18 to 24, 27.2% from 25 to 44, 28.9% from 45 to 64, and 13.2% who were 65 years of age or older. The median age was 41 years. For every 100 females, there were 97.5 males. For every 100 females age 18 and over, there were 86.1 males.

The median income for a household in the town was $26,563, and the median income for a family was $28,333. Males had a median income of $26,083 versus $18,750 for females. The per capita income for the town was $14,150. About 21.9% of families and 22.9% of the population were below the poverty line, including 25.5% of those under the age of eighteen and 17.9% of those 65 or over.

== Education ==
It is in the Newport School District.
