= Augusta High School (Arkansas) =

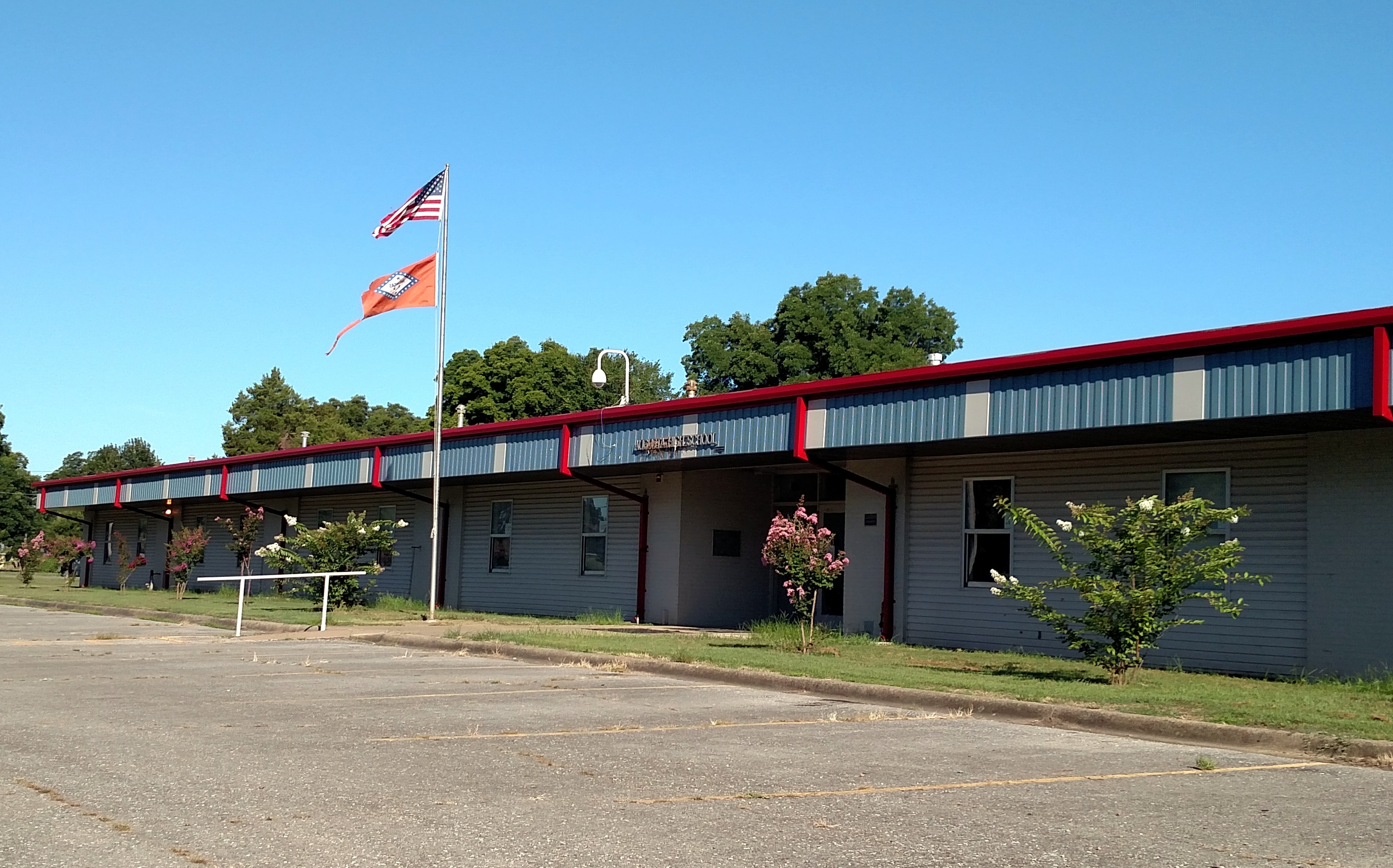

Location
- 206 Smith Drive; Augusta, Arkansas; United States; 35°17′2″N 91°21′21″W

Information
- Type: Public secondary
- Motto: Today we follow, tomorrow we lead.
- School district: Augusta School District
- NCES District ID: 0502670
- Superintendent: Cathy Tanner
- CEEB code: 040090
- NCES School ID: 050267000034
- Principal: Jacob Shafer
- Staff: 44.33 (on an FTE basis)
- Grades: 6 to 12
- Student to teacher ratio: 3.41
- Colors: Red and white
- Athletics conference: 1A Region 5 (2020-22)
- Mascot: Red Devil
- Website: www.augustasd.org

Augusta High School is a comprehensive public high school in Augusta, Arkansas, United States serving approximately 200 students in grades 6 through 12. The school is one of two public high schools in Woodruff County, Arkansas; the other is McCrory High School and it is the only high school in the Augusta School District.

== Academics ==
The assumed course of study follows the Smart Core curriculum developed by the Arkansas Department of Education (ADE), which requires students to complete at least 22 units to graduate. Students complete regular (core and career focus) courses and exams and may select Advanced Placement coursework and exams that provide an opportunity for college credit. The school is accredited by the ADE.

== Athletics ==
The Augusta High School mascot and athletic emblem is the Red Devil with Red and white serving as its school colors.

For 2014-16, the Augusta Red Devils compete in the 2A Region 6 (Football) Conference under the administration of the Arkansas Activities Association (AAA). Interscholastic activities include baseball, cheer, cross country (boys/girls), football, golf (boys/girls), softball, and track (boys/girls).

- Football: The Red Devils football teams have captured three state football championships winning consecutive titles in 1982 and 1983 before adding its last title banner in 1992.
- Golf: The boys golf team won its only state golf championship in 1971.
- Track and field: The girls track team won its only state championship in 1982. The boys track teams have won three state track and field championship titles (1988, 2010, 2011).

== Notable alumni ==
- Billy Ray Smith Sr. (1953)—NFL player (1957–71); member of 1971 Super Bowl champion Baltimore Colts

== Cultural impact ==
As a general assignment reporter in Arkansas, Isiah Carey often reported from remote and rural locations throughout the state. Reporting on the death of an adult chaperone at a football game at Augusta High School in 1996, Carey did several "stand-ups" to use in his story. During one of these stand-ups, a grasshopper flew into his mouth. Carey lost his composure and launched into a profanity-filled tirade about his hay fever, in a high-pitched Southern accent that contrasted with the deep voice and affirmative tone he normally uses on camera.

What really happened on that Thursday here at Augusta High School that led to Chris Woods' death—The fuck is that?! Shit! I’m dying in this fucking country ass fucked up town! Shit flying in my mouth...the fuck? I can't see, pollen—let's get the fuck out of this country motherfucker, I can't even see...

Although the bad take was never broadcast by the station, it was uploaded to YouTube in 2008 and became an internet phenomenon. The video was played on Jimmy Kimmel Live, ET and was featured on Howard Stern. It is also listed as one of the top viewed videos in any one day in Germany, Australia, Canada, the United Kingdom, Ireland, India, New Zealand, Mexico and France. In February 2009, the video was uploaded on Facebook and continues to receive thousands of hits a day, and two Carey Fanclubs have been established. The outtake was also parodied in the season two, episode 16 of The Cleveland Show, "The Way the Cookie Crumbles". In 2011, Carey was the subject of a "Web Redemption" on Tosh.0. An excerpt of the outtake was used in Michael Cera's 2014 album True That in the beginning seconds of the song "Moving In".
