= Louisiana Purchase (disambiguation) =

The Louisiana Purchase was the acquisition of the Louisiana territory by the United States from France.

Louisiana Purchase may also refer to:

- Louisiana Purchase (musical), a 1940 musical about Louisiana politics
- Louisiana Purchase (film), a 1941 adaptation of the musical
- Louisiana Purchase, conservatives' name for a deal allegedly made in exchange for U.S. Senator Mary Landrieu's support for the Patient Protection and Affordable Care Act
- Louisianna Purchase (drag queen), American drag performer

== See also ==
- Louisiana Purchase Exposition, the Saint Louis World's Fair of 1904
- Louisiana Purchase State Park in Arkansas
