= Monroe County, Arkansas =

County in Arkansas, United States

- County
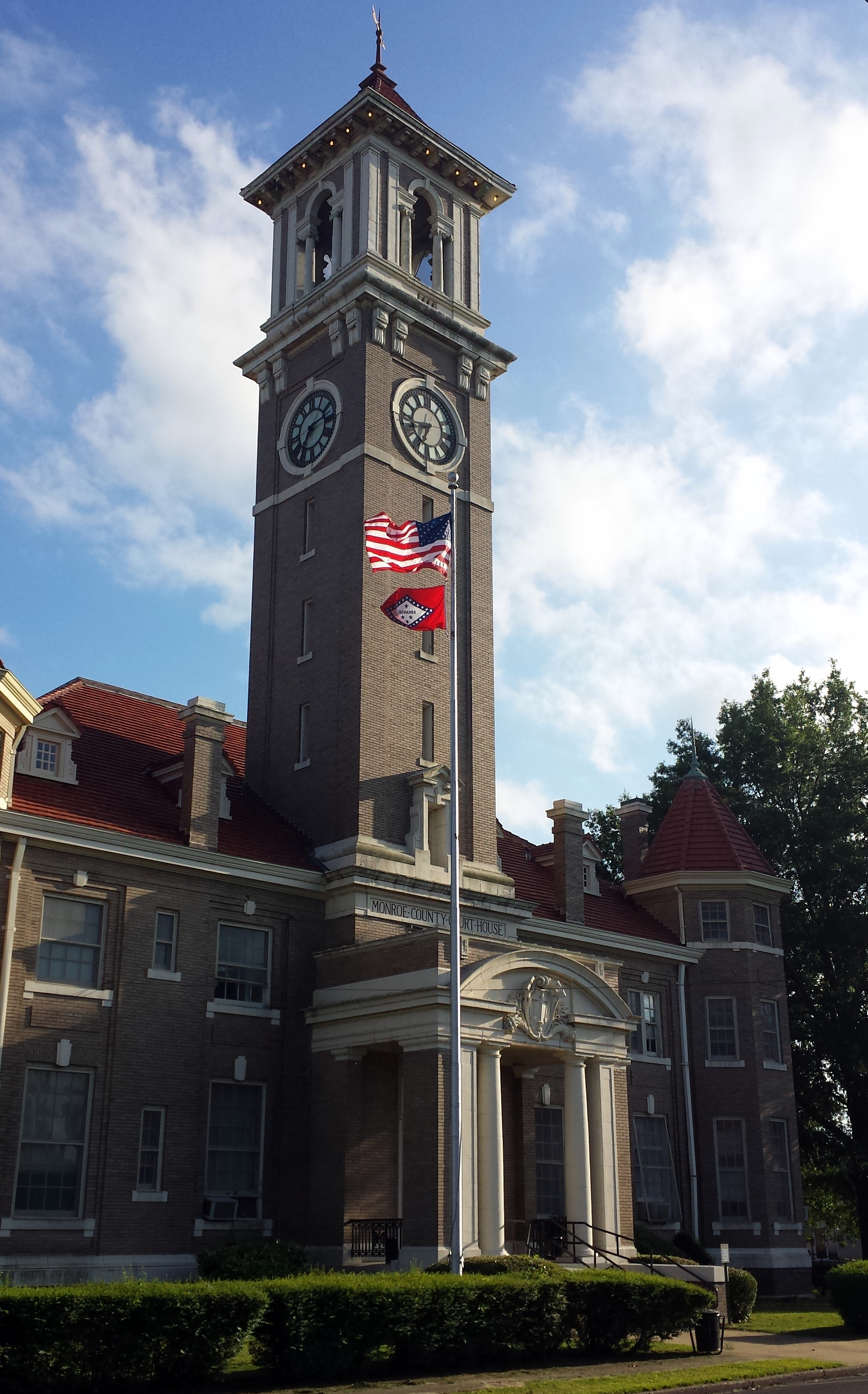
- Monroe County Courthouse in Clarendon

- Location within the U.S. state of Arkansas
- Coordinates: 34°42′48″N 91°13′20″W
- Country: United States
- State: Arkansas
- Founded: November 2, 1829
- Named for: James Monroe
- Seat: Clarendon
- Largest city: Brinkley

Area
  - Total: 621 sq mi (1,610 km^{2})
  - Land: 607 sq mi (1,570 km^{2})
  - Water: 14 sq mi (36 km^{2}) 2.3%

Population (2020)
  - Total: 6,799
  - Estimate (2025): 6,244 ▼
  - Density: 11.2/sq mi (4.32/km^{2})
- Time zone: UTC−6 (Central)
  - Summer (DST): UTC−5 (CDT)
- Congressional district: 1st

Monroe County is located in the Arkansas Delta in the U.S. state of Arkansas. The county is named for James Monroe, the fifth President of the United States. Created as Arkansas's 20th county on November 2, 1829, Monroe County is home to two incorporated towns and three incorporated cities, including Clarendon, the county seat, and Brinkley, the most populous city. The county is also the site of numerous unincorporated communities and ghost towns.

Occupying only 621 square miles (161,000 ha), Monroe County is the 22nd smallest county in Arkansas. As of the 2020 Census, the county's population was 6,799. Based on population, the county is the fifth-smallest county of the 75 in Arkansas. Located in the Arkansas Delta, the county is largely flat with fertile soils. Historically covered in forest, bayous, swamps, and grasslands, the area was cleared for agriculture by early European-American settlers and enslaved African Americans to do the work and to cultivate cotton. It is drained by the Cache River, Bayou DeView, and the White River. Three large protected areas preserve old growth bald cypress forest, sloughs and wildlife habitat in the county: Cache River National Wildlife Refuge (NWR), Dagmar Wildlife Management Area and White River NWR and provide places for hunting and fishing.

Interstate 40 is the only Interstate highway in Monroe County, crossing the county from east to west through Brinkley, the largest city. The county also has three United States highways (U.S. Route 49 [US 49], US 70, and US 79) and twelve Arkansas state highways run in the county. A Union Pacific Railroad line crosses the county from southwest to northeast.

== History ==
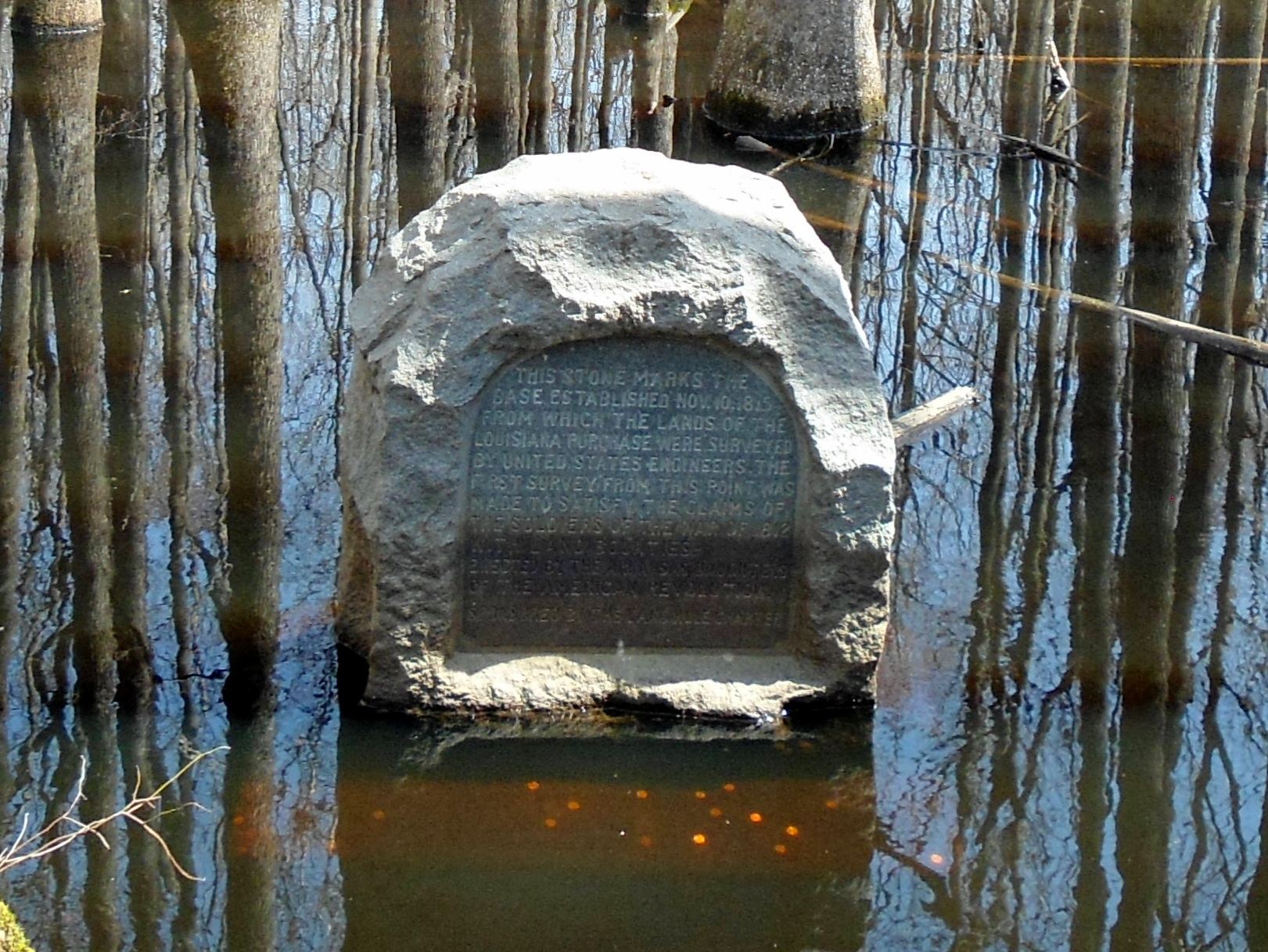
Marker to commemorate the point at which a national survey began of lands in this area, in order to allocate lands of the Louisiana Purchase to veterans of the War of 1812.

Shortly after the United States had completed the Louisiana Purchase, officials began to survey the territory at a site near the intersection of Monroe, Phillips, and Lee counties. From forested wetlands in what would become southern Monroe County, approximately 900,000 square miles (2,300,000 km^{2}) of land would be explored after President James Madison commissioned a survey of the purchase area. The point was commemorated in 1961 by the Arkansas General Assembly as part of Louisiana Purchase State Park.

Settlement in Monroe County began when Dedrick Pike settled in 1816 where the Cache River enters the White River. The settlement was named Mouth of the Cache, and a post office by that name was opened years later. The community renamed itself Clarendon in 1824 in honor of the Earl of Clarendon. Monroe County was established under the Arkansas territorial legislature in 1829, and the county seat was established at Lawrenceville, where a jail and courthouse were erected. A ferry across the White River was founded in 1836.

In 1857 the county seat was moved to Clarendon, Arkansas. The new brick courthouse was nearly finished by the outbreak of the American Civil War in 1861. The county sent five units into Confederate service. After Union troops captured Clarendon in 1863, they destroyed the small city. The Union had completely dismantled the brick courthouse and shipped the bricks to De Valls Bluff.

After the war, during Reconstruction, there was a high level of violence by insurgent whites seeking to suppress the rights of freedmen and to keep them from voting. After Republican Congressman James M. Hinds was murdered by George Clark, a Democrat and member of the Ku Klux Klan in Monroe County in October 1868, Governor Powell Clayton established martial law in ten counties, including Monroe County, as the attacks and murders were out of control. Four military districts were operated for four years in an effort to suppress guerrilla insurgency by white paramilitary groups, such as the Ku Klux Klan and others. They continued to challenge enfranchisement of blacks and the increasing power of Republicans in the county. The Monroe County Sun newspaper was established in 1876.

Violence continued after Reconstruction, when Democrats had regained control of the state legislature. Whites struggled to re-establish white supremacy, by violence and intimidation of black Republican voters. At the turn of the century, the state legislature passed measures that effectively disenfranchised most blacks for decades. The Equal Justice Initiative reported in 2015 that the county had 12 lynchings of African Americans from 1877 to 1950, most in the decades near the turn of the 20th century. This was the fourth-highest of any county in the state. To escape the violence, thousands of African Americans left the state in the Great Migration to northern and western cities, especially after 1940.

Mechanization of farming and industrial-scale agriculture have decreased the need for workers. The rural county has continued to lose population because of the lack of work opportunities. There has been a decrease in population every decade since 1940.

== Geography ==
The county is located in the Arkansas Delta, one of the six primary geographic regions of Arkansas. The Arkansas Delta is a subregion of the Mississippi Alluvial Plain, which is a flat area consisting of rich, fertile sediment deposits from the Mississippi River between Louisiana and Illinois. Large portions of Monroe County are also within the Grand Prairie, a subdivision of the Arkansas Delta known today for rice farming and aquaculture. According to the U.S. Census Bureau, the county has a total area of 621 square miles (1,610 km^{2}), of which 607 square miles (1,570 km^{2}) is land and 14 square miles (36 km^{2}) (2.3%) is water.

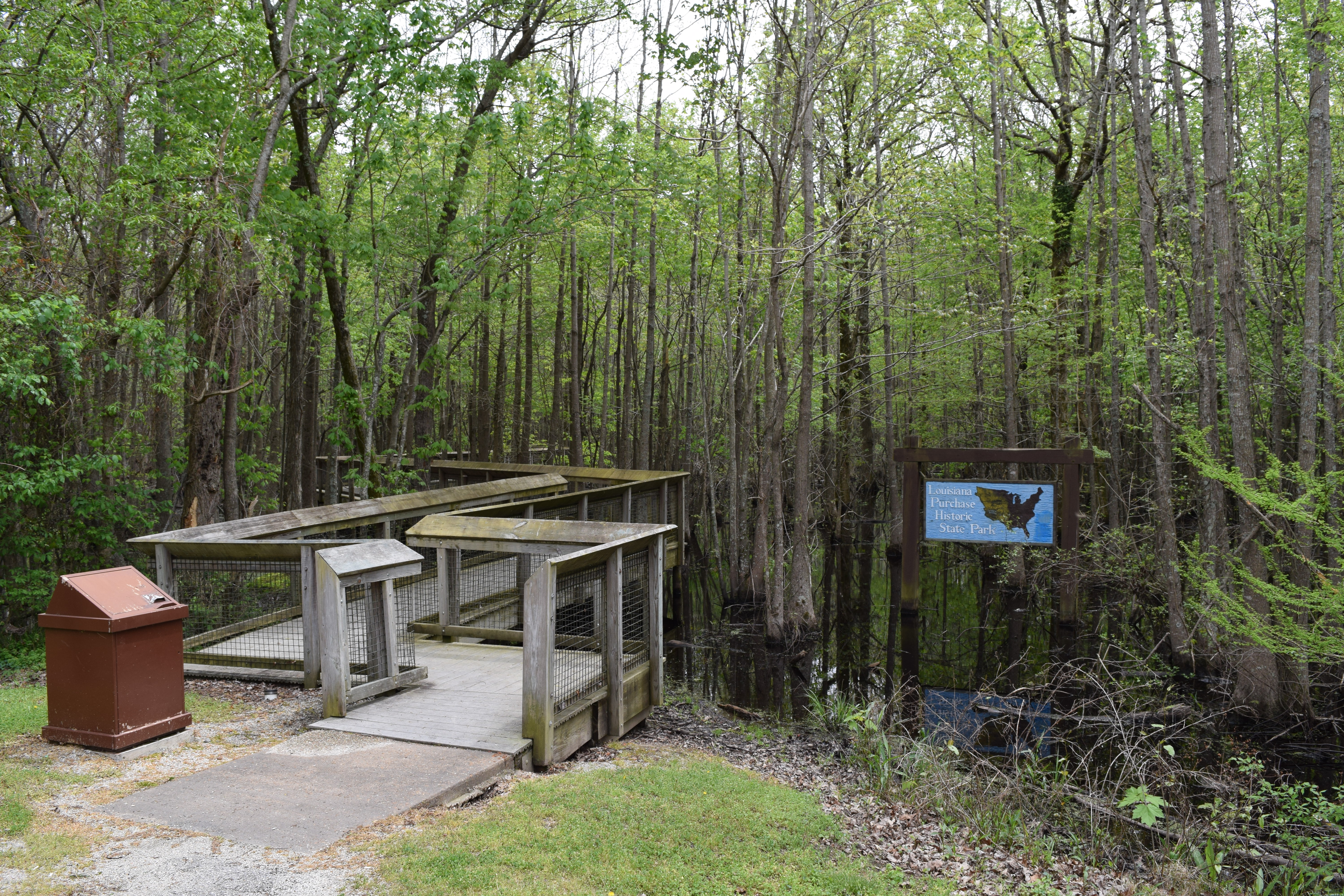
Headwater swamp at the entrance to Louisiana Purchase State Park, southern Monroe County

Prior to settlement, Monroe County was densely forested, with bayous, sloughs, and swamps crossing the land. Seeking to take advantage of the area's fertile soils, settlers cleared the land to better suit row crops. Although some swampland has been preserved in the conservation areas like the Cache River NWR and White River NWR, and some former farmland has undergone reforestation, the majority (52 percent) of the county remains in cultivation. (Note: In 2015, 101.1 thousand acres of soybeans, 46.2 thousand acres of rice, 22.9 thousand acres of sorghum, 16.0 thousand acres of wheat, and 15.3 thousand acres of corn were planted in Monroe County. Total acreage for those two crops is 201,500. Monroe County has 607 square miles of land area, which is 388,480 acres based on 640 acres per square mile. Acreage for the total crops (201,500) divided by acreage for the county (388,480) is 51.9 percent.) Another large land use in Monroe County is the Cache River NWR and White River NWR, owned by the United States Fish and Wildlife Service.

The county is located approximately 73 miles (117 km) east of Little Rock and 88 miles (142 km) west-southwest of Memphis, Tennessee. (Note: Mileages from Monroe County to Little Rock and Memphis are based on highway miles using county seat Clarendon for Monroe County.) Monroe County is surrounded by six other Delta counties: Woodruff County to the north, St. Francis County to the northeast, Lee County and Phillips County to the east, Arkansas County to the southwest, and Prairie County to the west.

=== Hydrology ===
Water is an extremely important part of Monroe County's geography, history, economy, and culture. The many rivers, streams, ditches, sloughs and bayous crossing the county have featured prominently since prehistoric times. Native American tribes settled near them and peoples such as the Quapaw constructed burial mounds at Indian Bay in extreme southern Monroe County (today preserved as Baytown Site).

Europeans who settled in the county also used the White River to navigate through the area and trade. Control of the White River lead to military action in the county during the Civil War, including a gunboat battle at Clarendon in 1864. The Flood of 1927 damaged much of the county's settlements along the White, and inundated Clarendon when the levees protecting the city failed on April 20. Conservation efforts by leaders in the county resulted in the creation of federal and state protected areas around the Cache and White rivers, to protect wetlands that could absorb flooding, beginning in 1935. These have been expanded to the current day, as engineers understand more about the positive role of wetlands in floodplain ecology.

The White River, one of Arkansas's most important rivers, is the county's major hydrologic features. The White forms the southwestern boundary of the county with Arkansas County. The Cache River runs on the west side of Monroe County, partially forming its border with Prairie County. Both the Cache River and Roc Roe Bayou empty into the White near Clarendon. Bayou De View runs through the north part of the county and meets the Cache north of Dobbs Landing.

=== National protected areas ===
- Cache River National Wildlife Refuge (part)
- White River National Wildlife Refuge (part)

== Demographics ==
Historical population
Census	Pop.	Note	%±
1830	461		—
1840	936		103.0%
1850	2,049		118.9%
1860	5,657		176.1%
1870	8,336		47.4%
1880	9,574		14.9%
1890	15,336		60.2%
1900	16,816		9.7%
1910	19,907		18.4%
1920	21,601		8.5%
1930	20,651		−4.4%
1940	21,133		2.3%
1950	19,540		−7.5%
1960	17,327		−11.3%
1970	15,657		−9.6%
1980	14,052		−10.3%
1990	11,333		−19.3%
2000	10,254		−9.5%
2010	8,149		−20.5%
2020	6,799		−16.6%
2025 (est.)	6,244	▼	−8.2%
U.S. Decennial Census; 1790–1960 1900–1990; 1990–2000 2010

=== 2020 census ===
As of the 2020 census, the county had a population of 6,799. The median age was 46.9 years. 21.1% of residents were under the age of 18 and 23.4% of residents were 65 years of age or older. For every 100 females there were 91.4 males, and for every 100 females age 18 and over there were 89.3 males age 18 and over.

The racial makeup of the county was 52.5% White, 40.6% Black or African American, 0.5% American Indian and Alaska Native, 0.4% Asian, 0.1% Native Hawaiian and Pacific Islander, 2.1% from some other race, and 3.8% from two or more races. Hispanic or Latino residents of any race comprised 2.7% of the population.

<0.1% of residents lived in urban areas, while 100.0% lived in rural areas.

There were 3,040 households in the county, of which 25.0% had children under the age of 18 living in them. Of all households, 36.2% were married-couple households, 22.8% were households with a male householder and no spouse or partner present, and 35.2% were households with a female householder and no spouse or partner present. About 36.4% of all households were made up of individuals and 17.5% had someone living alone who was 65 years of age or older.

There were 3,828 housing units, of which 20.6% were vacant. Among occupied housing units, 61.9% were owner-occupied and 38.1% were renter-occupied. The homeowner vacancy rate was 1.7% and the rental vacancy rate was 12.5%.

=== 2000 census ===
As of the 2000 United States census, there were 10,254 people, 4,105 households, and 2,733 families residing in the county. The population density was 17 people per square mile (6.6 people/km^{2}). There were 5,067 housing units at an average density of 8 per square mile (3.1/km^{2}). The racial makeup of the county was 59.37% White, 38.79% Black or African American, 0.26% Native American, 0.13% Asian, 0.04% Pacific Islander, 0.26% from other races, and 1.14% from two or more races. 1.29% of the population were Hispanic or Latino of any race.

There were 4,105 households, out of which 29.30% had children under the age of 18 living with them, 46.10% were married couples living together, 16.70% had a female householder with no husband present, and 33.40% were non-families. 30.10% of all households were made up of individuals, and 15.10% had someone living alone who was 65 years of age or older. The average household size was 2.47 and the average family size was 3.07.

In the county, the population was spread out, with 27.90% under the age of 18, 7.60% from 18 to 24, 23.70% from 25 to 44, 23.40% from 45 to 64, and 17.30% who were 65 years of age or older. The median age was 38 years. For every 100 females there were 88.50 males. For every 100 females age 18 and over, there were 83.30 males.

The median income for a household in the county was $22,632, and the median income for a family was $28,915. Males had a median income of $25,299 versus $17,117 for females. The per capita income for the county was $13,096. About 21.00% of families and 27.50% of the population were below the poverty line, including 37.40% of those under age 18 and 22.40% of those age 65 or over.

== Government ==
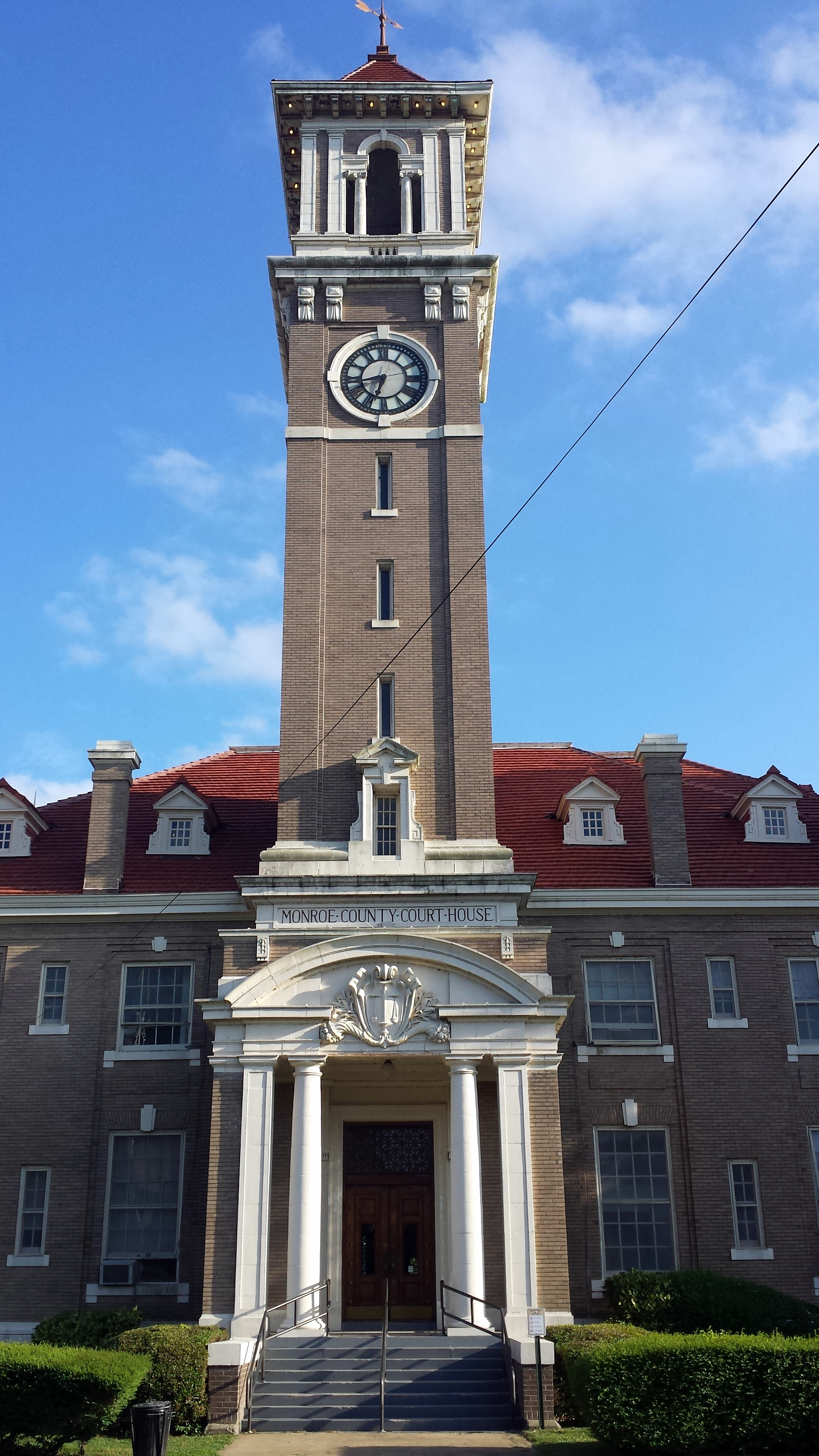
The Monroe County Courthouse in Clarendon is the seat of county government

The county government is a constitutional body granted specific powers by the Constitution of Arkansas and the Arkansas Code. The quorum court is the legislative branch of the county government and controls all spending and revenue collection. Representatives are called justices of the peace and are elected from county districts every even-numbered year. The number of districts in a county vary from nine to fifteen, and district boundaries are drawn by the county election commission. The Monroe County Quorum Court has nine members. Presiding over quorum court meetings is the county judge, who serves as the chief operating officer of the county. The county judge is elected at-large and does not vote in quorum court business, although capable of vetoing quorum court decisions.

Monroe County, Arkansas Elected countywide officials
Position	Officeholder	Party
County Judge	P.K. Norman	Republican
County Clerk	Tina Wofford	Independent
Circuit Clerk	Alice Smith	Republican
Sheriff	Michael Neal	Independent
Treasurer/Collector	Steven Mitchell	Democratic
Assessor	Stacey Wilkerson	Democratic
Coroner	Bob Neal	Independent

The composition of the Quorum Court after the 2024 elections is 5 Republicans and 4 Democrats. Justices of the Peace (members) of the Quorum Court following the elections are:

- District 1: Cathy Shelton (D)
- District 2: Jeffrey Lovell (R)
- District 3: Stephanie Sims (D)
- District 4: Kenneth Harvey Sr. (D)
- District 5: Ryan Medford (R)
- District 6: James Boston (R)
- District 7: Jimmy Rogers (R)
- District 8: Doug Mayhue (D)
- District 9: Alvin Beck (R)

Additionally, the townships of Monroe County are entitled to elect their own respective constables, as set forth by the Constitution of Arkansas. Constables are largely of historical significance as they were used to keep the peace in rural areas when travel was more difficult.

The township constables as of the 2024 elections are:

- Cache: Allan Spencer (R)
- Montgomery and Smalley: Terry Newsom (R)

=== Politics ===
A portion of Monroe County is represented in the Arkansas Senate by Republican Ron Caldwell, a real estate businessman from Wynne in Cross County. The state representative from Monroe County is Democrat Marshall Wright, a lawyer from Forrest City in St. Francis County.

Prior to 2000, Monroe was considered an "ancestral" Democratic county, with exceptions for the 1972 and 1984 landslides of Richard Nixon and Ronald Reagan, respectively. Arkansas native Bill Clinton won the county twice in his presidential runs: 1992 and 1996. John Kerry won the county in 2004, the most recent Democrat to do so.

Over the past few election cycles Monroe has trended a bit more to the Republican Party, albeit with less fervor than its neighboring counties. Barack Obama lost the county by only two votes in his 2012 run, and former Arkansas First Lady Hillary Clinton lost it by more than six points, 52%-45%, in her 2016 race.

United States presidential election results for Monroe County, Arkansas
Year	Republican		Democratic		Third party(ies)	
Year	No.	%	No.	%	No.	%
1896	436	27.39%	1,019	64.01%	137	8.61%
1900	403	36.27%	708	63.73%	0	0.00%
1904	555	41.86%	757	57.09%	14	1.06%
1908	1,022	51.56%	912	46.01%	48	2.42%
1912	400	32.95%	537	44.23%	277	22.82%
1916	508	40.67%	741	59.33%	0	0.00%
1920	912	51.35%	834	46.96%	30	1.69%
1924	330	26.00%	838	66.04%	101	7.96%
1928	411	32.54%	851	67.38%	1	0.08%
1932	170	8.79%	1,753	90.59%	12	0.62%
1936	82	6.91%	1,102	92.84%	3	0.25%
1940	128	7.88%	1,494	92.00%	2	0.12%
1944	291	18.12%	1,311	81.63%	4	0.25%
1948	299	12.72%	1,431	60.89%	620	26.38%
1952	947	34.05%	1,834	65.95%	0	0.00%
1956	1,099	41.72%	1,460	55.43%	75	2.85%
1960	833	27.15%	1,856	60.50%	379	12.35%
1964	1,968	46.45%	2,258	53.29%	11	0.26%
1968	804	16.10%	1,783	35.71%	2,406	48.19%
1972	2,897	63.45%	1,578	34.56%	91	1.99%
1976	1,285	26.51%	3,556	73.35%	7	0.14%
1980	2,027	41.98%	2,686	55.62%	116	2.40%
1984	2,508	50.45%	2,413	48.54%	50	1.01%
1988	1,862	46.88%	2,052	51.66%	58	1.46%
1992	1,324	30.99%	2,578	60.35%	370	8.66%
1996	973	28.14%	2,247	64.98%	238	6.88%
2000	1,329	40.36%	1,910	58.00%	54	1.64%
2004	1,586	43.25%	2,049	55.88%	32	0.87%
2008	1,754	50.86%	1,615	46.83%	80	2.32%
2012	1,585	49.07%	1,583	49.01%	62	1.92%
2016	1,489	51.63%	1,312	45.49%	83	2.88%
2020	1,545	54.87%	1,147	40.73%	124	4.40%
2024	1,385	56.93%	1,002	41.18%	46	1.89%

== Education ==
Public education in Monroe County is primarily provided by two districts:

- Brinkley School District, with two schools serving more than 400 students PreK-12 in northern Monroe County; includes Brinkley High School.
- Clarendon School District, with two schools serving more than 400 students in southern Monroe County; includes Clarendon High School. In 2004, the Holly Grove School District was consolidated into the Clarendon district.

== Communities ==
=== Cities ===
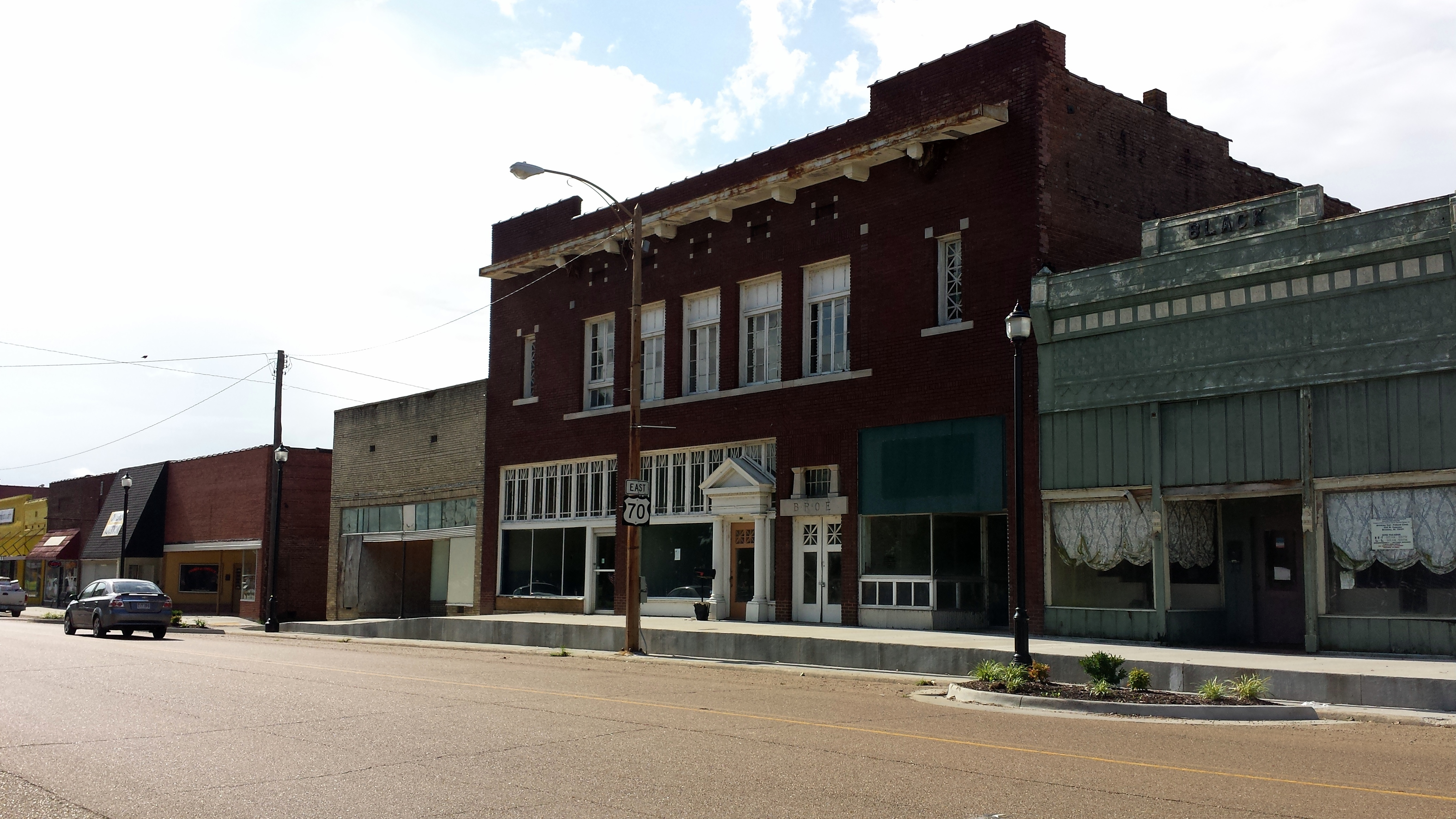
Streetside in downtown Brinkley

- Brinkley
- Clarendon (county seat)
- Holly Grove

=== Towns ===
- Fargo
- Roe

=== Census-designated places ===
- Indian Bay
- Monroe

=== Townships ===
Townships in Arkansas are the divisions of a county. Each township includes unincorporated areas; some may have incorporated cities or towns within part of their boundaries. Arkansas townships have limited purposes in modern times. However, the United States census does list Arkansas population based on townships (sometimes referred to as "county subdivisions" or "minor civil divisions"). Townships are also of value for historical purposes in terms of genealogical research. Each town or city is within one or more townships in an Arkansas county based on census maps and publications. The townships of Monroe County are listed below; listed in parentheses are the cities, towns, and/or census-designated places that are fully or partially inside the township.

- Brinkley (most of Brinkley)
- Brown
- Cache (Clarendon)
- Cleburne
- Cypress Ridge
- Dixon (part of Brinkley)
- Duncan (Holly Grove)
- Greenfield (Fargo)
- Hindman
- Jackson
- Keevil
- Montgomery-Smalley
- Pine Ridge
- Raymond
- Richland (part of Brinkley)
- Roc Roe (Roe)

== Infrastructure ==
=== Aviation ===
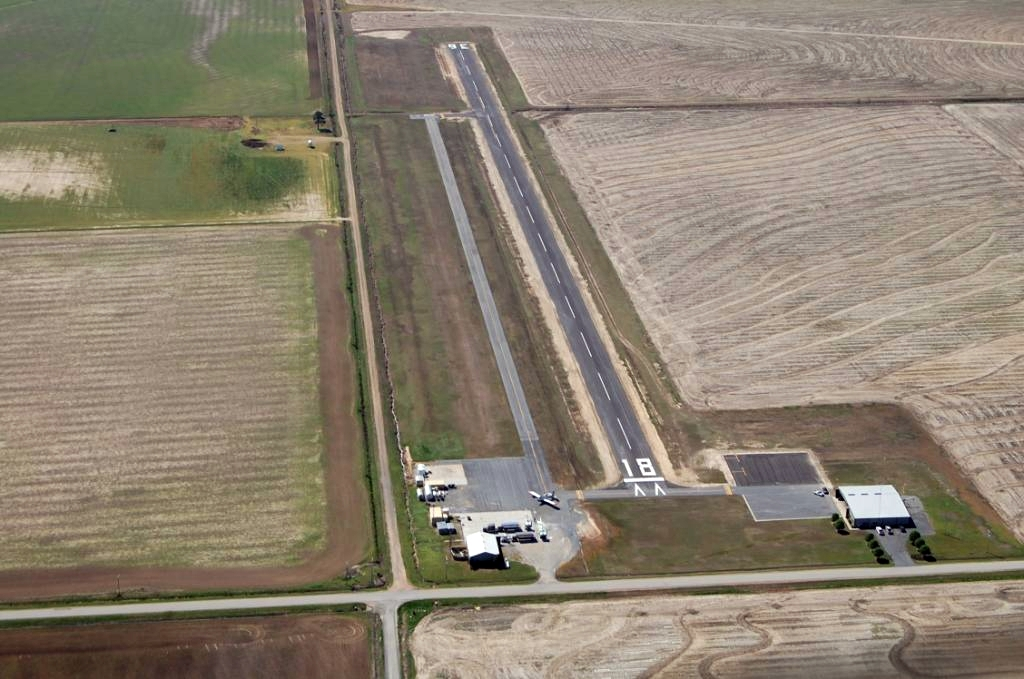
Clarendon Municipal Airport

Monroe County is home to three public own/public use general aviation (GA) airports. Each airport is used largely for agricultural spraying operations. The Clarendon Municipal Airport located southwest of Clarendon and northwest of Roe along Highway 33. For the twelve-month period ending August 31, 2015, the facility saw 26,000 general aviation operations. Frank Federer Memorial Airport in southeast Brinkley had 22,000 GA operations in the twelve-month period ending August 31, 2015. Holly Grove Municipal Airport located east of Holly Grove on Highway 146 is also a small rural airport. For the twelve-month period ending August 31, 2015, the facility saw 22,000 general aviation operations.

=== Major highways ===
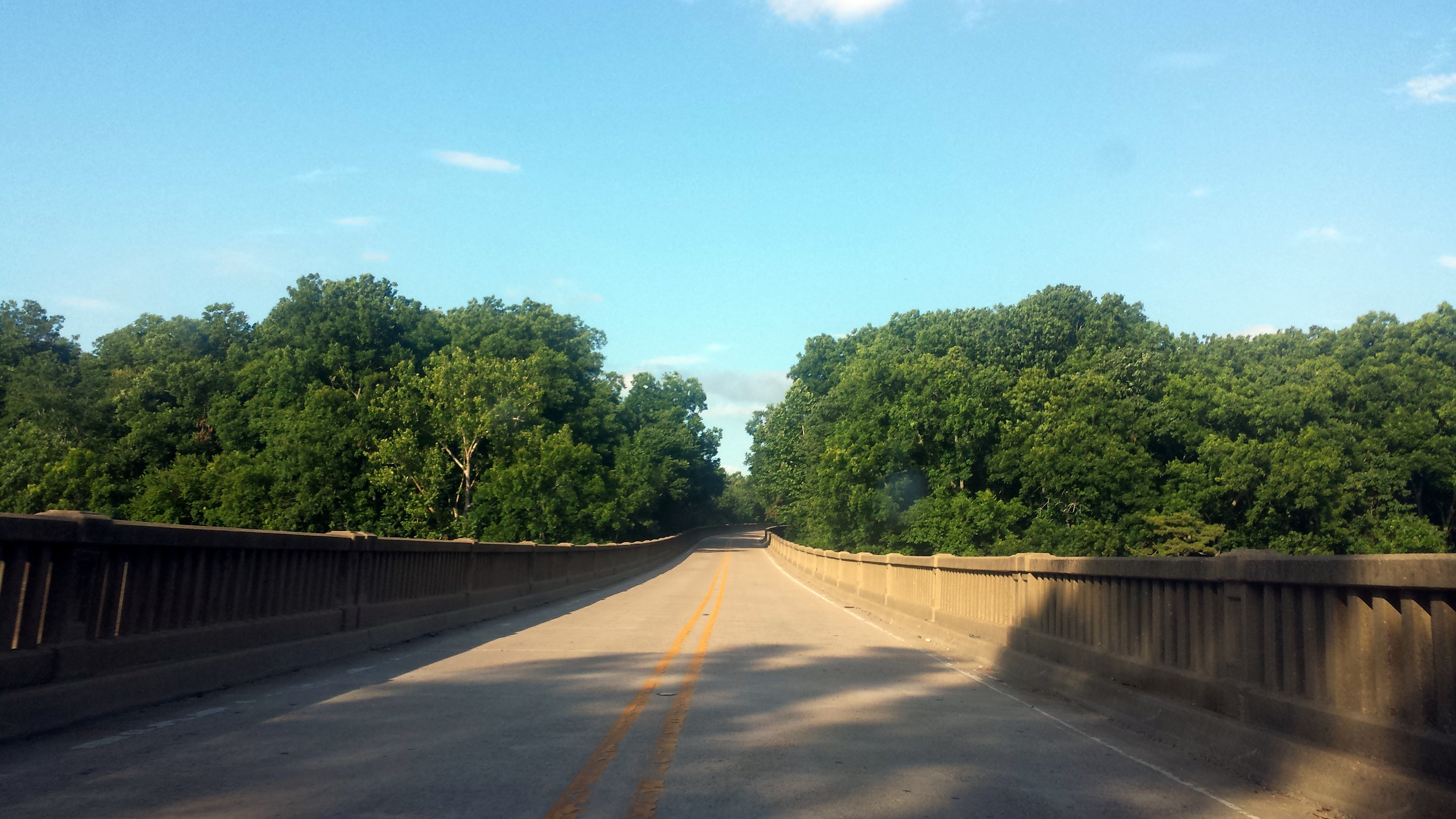
US 79 passes through wetlands near the White River on a historic curved concrete bridge

- I-40
- US 49
- US 63
- US 70
- US 79
- AR 1
- AR 17
- AR 33
- AR 39
- AR 86
- AR 146
- AR 238
- AR 241
- AR 302
- AR 316
- AR 362
- AR 366

=== Transit ===
Intercity bus service to the county is provided by Jefferson Lines, which has a stop in Brinkley.

=== Utilities ===
The Arkansas Department of Health is responsible for the regulation and oversight of public water systems throughout the state. Monroe County contains six community water systems: Brinkley Waterworks, Clarendon Waterworks, Holly Grove Waterworks, Roe Waterworks, United Water Association and East Monroe County Water Users. Brinkley Waterworks has the largest retail population (4,281), followed by Clarendon (1,640), and Holly Grove (1,010). All community water systems in Monroe County use groundwater as their source of raw water, except East Monroe County Water Users, who purchases all water from Brinkley.

== Notable people ==
- Sheffield Nelson, the Arkansas Republican National Committeeman and his party's gubernatorial nominee in 1990 and 1994, was born in 1940 in Monroe County.

== See also ==
- List of lakes in Monroe County, Arkansas
- National Register of Historic Places listings in Monroe County, Arkansas

== Notes and references ==
Notes

References

- Bateman, Alta M. "The History of Clarendon and Monroe County". Monroe County Sun.
