= Cache River National Wildlife Refuge =

National Wildlife Refuge in Arkansas, USA

- IUCN category IV (habitat/species management area)
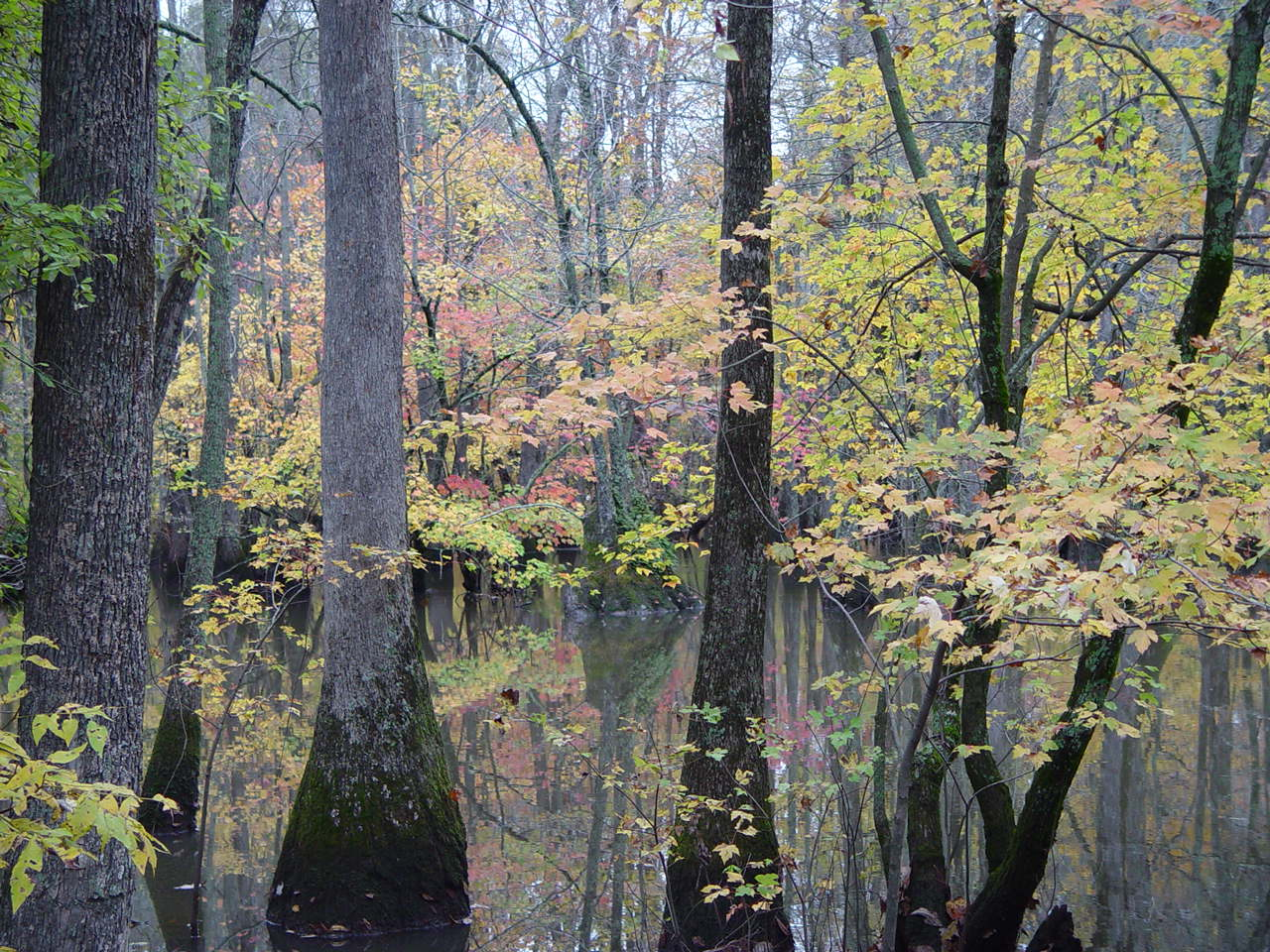

- Location within the United States
- Location: Arkansas, United States
- Coordinates: 35°03′30″N 91°19′45″W
- Area: 68,993 acres (279.20 km^{2})
- Established: 1986
- Governing body: U.S. Fish and Wildlife Service
- Website: Cache River NWR

Ramsar Wetland
- Official name: Cache-Lower White Rivers
- Designated: 21 November 1989
- Reference no.: 442

The Cache River National Wildlife Refuge is a 68,993 acre (223 km^{2}) (2014) wildlife refuge in the state of Arkansas managed by the United States Fish and Wildlife Service (FWS). The refuge is one of the Ramsar wetlands of international importance under the Ramsar Convention signed in 1971. It is one of the most important wintering area for ducks and the largest remaining tract of contiguous bottomland hardwood forest on the North American continent. In 2005, a possible sighting of the ivory-billed woodpecker, thought to be extinct, brought attention to the refuge.

In 2012, the FWS proposed the gradual expansion of the refuge up to a maximum of 287,574 acres (116,377 ha).

== History and description ==
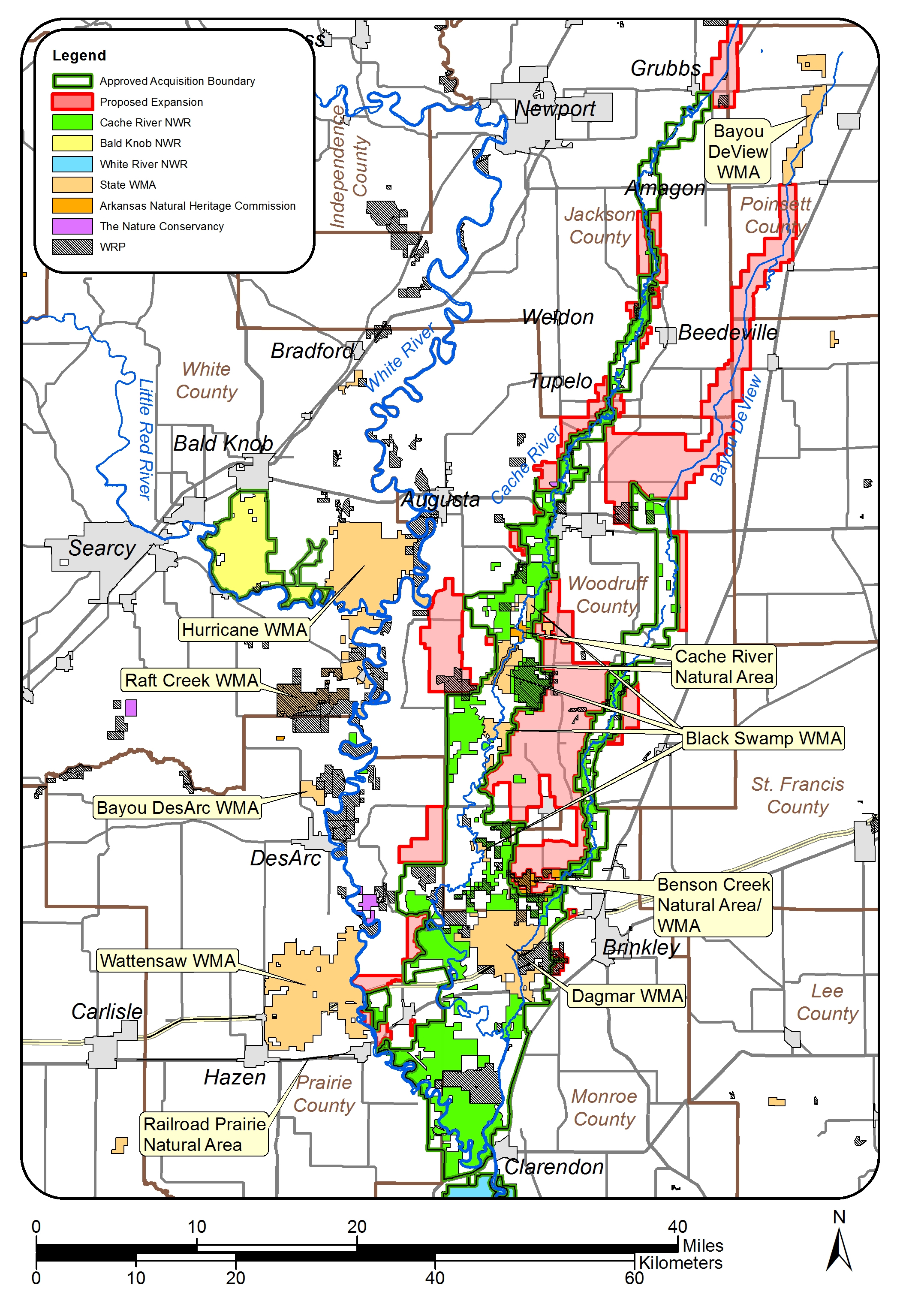
A map of Cache River National Wildlife Refuge and the surrounding area, including areas proposed for expansion.

In the 1970s, duck hunters prevented the U.S. Army Corps of Engineers from dredging and straightening the Cache River. The conservation movement led to the establishment of the National Wildlife Refuge in 1986. The nearby town of Stuttgart, Arkansas calls itself the "Rice and Duck Capital of the World". The National Wildlife Refuge runs along the flood-plain of the Cache River for 70 miles (100 km) from the Cache River's mouth at Clarendon, Arkansas to the town of Grubbs, Arkansas. The refuge encompasses land in the Arkansas counties of Jackson, Woodruff, Prairie, and Monroe.

The Cache River NWR has gradually expanded to its present size through acquisition from private owners of land. Most of the land in the refuge, and that planned for acquisition, had been drained and used for agriculture. The long-term goal is to re-forest former farming areas with native vegetation along the meandering sloughs, oxbow lakes, swamps, and bald cypress forests of the Cache River and Bayou De View. The Cache River NWR already preserves the largest tract of contiguous bottomland hardwood forest remaining in the United States.

The refuge currently includes 47,000 acres (134 km^{2}) of bottomland forest and sloughs. It also includes several oxbow lakes and 17,000 acres (30 km^{2}) of formerly agricultural land now in the process of reforestation. The refuge is home to over 50 species of mammals including deer, raccoon, bobcat, and river otter. It also is home for nearly 240 species of birds including ducks, geese, wading birds, and other assorted migratory birds. The swampy bottomlands are also home to 48 species of reptiles and amphibians.

The Cache River refuge is the most important wintering area for mallard ducks in North America and also important for other duck and neo-tropic species. It hosts the only native black bear population in Arkansas.

Other similar protected areas for wildlife located nearby along the Cache and White Rivers include the Bald Knob, Big Lake, and Wapanocca National Wildlife Refuges. Other conservation lands such as several state owned wildlife management areas are also nearby. The White River National Wildlife Refuge borders the Cache River Refuge on the south.

== Ivory-billed woodpecker ==
On April 29, 2005, a team from the Cornell Lab of Ornithology claimed they had recorded video and audio evidence of the ivory-billed woodpecker in the refuge despite the species's presumed extinction over sixty years prior. Subsequent searches in 2006 and 2007 failed to find the species, and the legitimacy of the 2005 sighting remains a source of considerable debate. Much of the refuge was closed to the public following the announcement, but the refuge was reopened to the public in 2006 after researchers could not locate the woodpeckers.

== Recreation ==
The refuge attracts 120,000 visitors annually. Hunting, fishing, canoeing, wildlife observation, and photography are popular. Deer, small game, duck, and goose hunting is allowed during seasons in the autumn and winter. Fishing is allowed year-round.

== Expansion plans ==
In 2012 the FWS proposed a major expansion in the acreage of the Cache River Refuge. The boundaries of the area proposed by acquisition include 287,574 acres (116,377 ha) within which land would be purchased from willing buyers and subject to the availability of funds. The objectives of the expansion are to restore the natural ecosystem of land that had been converted to agriculture, to reforest cleared land, and provide a buffer for the present refuge which consists mostly of a narrow corridor along the Cache River and Bayou DeView.

Three priority areas for purchase were identified. First, the FWS proposes to acquire up to 38,483 acres between the Cache River and Bayou DeView rivers. The addition of these lands to the refuge would enable the two watersheds to be re-connected and the 85 percent of the land now farmed to be reforested. Secondly, the FWS proposes to purchase 32,600 acres to extend the refuge about 30 miles northward in a narrow strip, now only six percent forested, along Bayou DeView. The third priority area for purchase is the Cache River Peripheral with 29,997 acres which to partially connect the Cache River Refuge with protected lands along the White River. Unique to the Lower Valley of the Mississippi River about 13 percent of this area consists of sand dunes with vegetation adapted to dryer climates.

As there are several hundred landowners in the priority areas, acquisition of the land will likely take many years.
