= Bayou DeView =

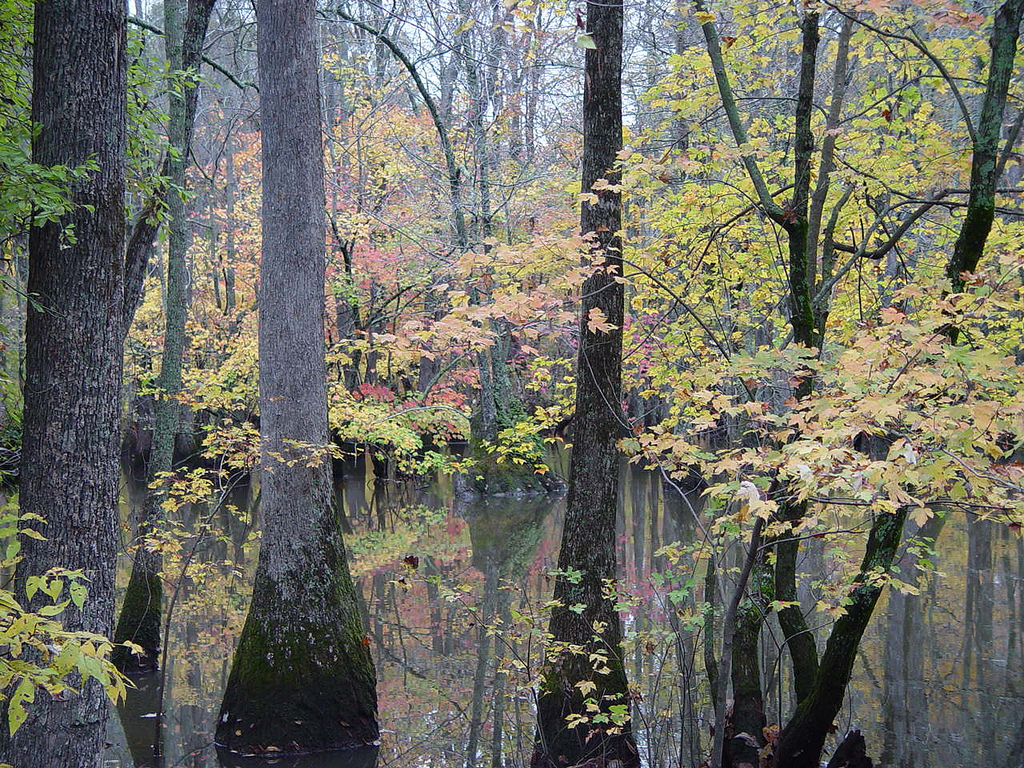
- Bayou DeView in the Cache River National Wildlife Refuge

Location
- Country: United States
- State: Arkansas

Physical characteristics
- Source
  - location: Craighead County
  - coordinates: 35°42′33″N 90°54′20″W
- Mouth: Confluence with the Cache River
  - location: Monroe County
  - coordinates: 34°47′30″N 91°17′51″W
  - elevation: 157 ft (48 m)
- Length: 83 mi (134 km)

Bayou DeView is an 83-mile-long (134 km) waterway that flows through parts of Poinsett, Woodruff, Monroe and Prairie counties in northeastern Arkansas. The bayou is part of the Cache and White River basins, ultimately flowing into the Mississippi River.

Several miles of the lower portion of Bayou DeView is within the Cache River National Wildlife Refuge. In 2012, the Fish and Wildlife Service proposed an expansion of the refuge, purchasing land as available from willing sellers, to include an additional 30 miles (48 km) of Bayou DeView in the refuge.

The land area bordering the bayou supports dense vegetation in the form of tupelo, bald cypress, hickory, pine and other native trees of the hardwood and softwood families. This area used to be known as part of the "Big Woods" of Arkansas, but most of the standing timber was cleared for farming by the second half of the 20th century. Now, however, there are many reforestation projects underway around the edges of the bayou, including moist-soils projects and hardwood planting projects.

In the 21st century, Bayou DeView and the town of Brinkley gained international attention from possible sightings of the ivory-billed woodpecker, which was thought to be extinct since the 1940s.

== See also ==
- List of rivers of Arkansas
