= Arkansas Highway 362 =

State highway in Arkansas, United States

Highway 362

Route information
- Maintained by ArDOT
- Length: 1.72 mi (2.77 km)
- Existed: November 26, 1969–present

Major junctions
- West end: US 49 near Blackton
- East end: Louisiana Purchase State Park

Location
- Country: United States
- State: Arkansas
- Counties: Monroe

Highway system
- Arkansas Highway System; Interstate; US; State; Business; Spurs; Suffixed; Scenic; Heritage
← AR 361	→ AR 363

Highway 362 (AR 362, Ark. 362, and Hwy. 362) is a state highway in Monroe County. The route of 1.72 miles (2.77 km) runs from US Highway 49 (US 49) east to Louisiana Purchase State Park. The route is maintained by the Arkansas State Highway and Transportation Department (AHTD).

== Route description ==
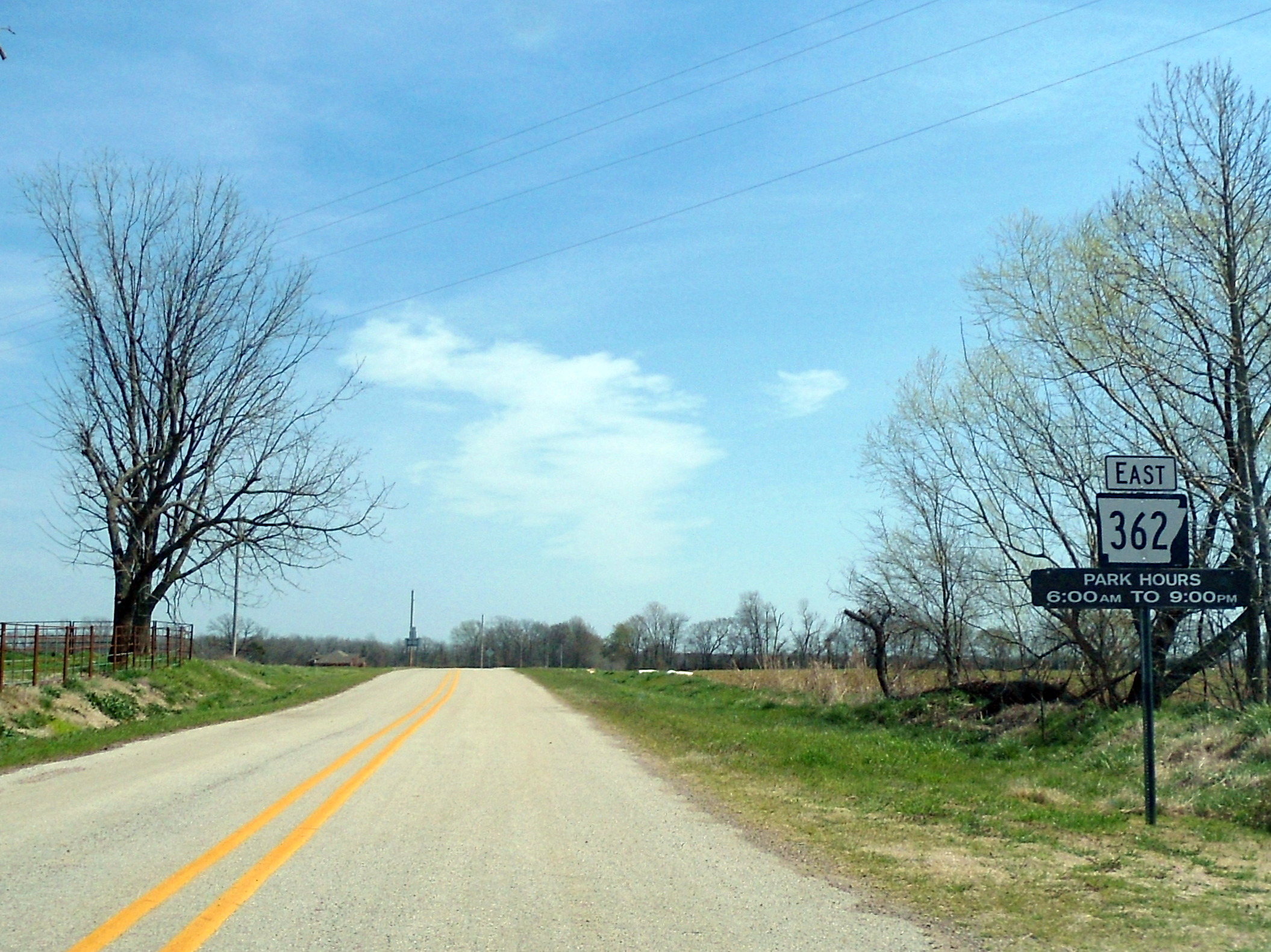
Highway 362 near the western terminus

Highway 362 begins at Highway 49 in eastern Monroe County within the Arkansas Delta south of Blackton. The highway runs due east as a section line road toward Louisiana Purchase State Park. After the last driveway, a gate operated by the Arkansas Department of Parks and Tourism will close when the park is closed. The roadway enters a headwater swamp, with large water tupelo and bald cypress trees forming an allée before terminating at a small parking lot for the park. Park visitors continue on an elevated foot bridge over the swamp to the Louisiana Purchase monument.

== History ==
Highway 362 was created by the Arkansas State Highway Commission on November 26, 1969, by adding a county road to the state highway system to provide access to the Louisiana Purchase marker.

== Major intersections ==
The entire route is in Monroe County.

Location	mi	km	Destinations	Notes
	0.00	0.00	US 49 – Brinkley, Marvell	Western terminus
	1.72	2.77	Louisiana Purchase State Park	Eastern terminus
1.000 mi = 1.609 km; 1.000 km = 0.621 mi
