= White River National Wildlife Refuge =

Protected area in Arkansas, United States

- Location within the United States
- Location: Arkansas, United States
- Nearest city: De Witt, Arkansas
- Coordinates: 34°21′N 91°06′W
- Area: 160,756 acres (650.56 km^{2})
- Established: 1935
- Governing body: U.S. Fish and Wildlife Service
- Website: White River NWR

Ramsar Wetland
- Official name: Cache-Lower White Rivers
- Designated: 21 November 1989
- Reference no.: 442

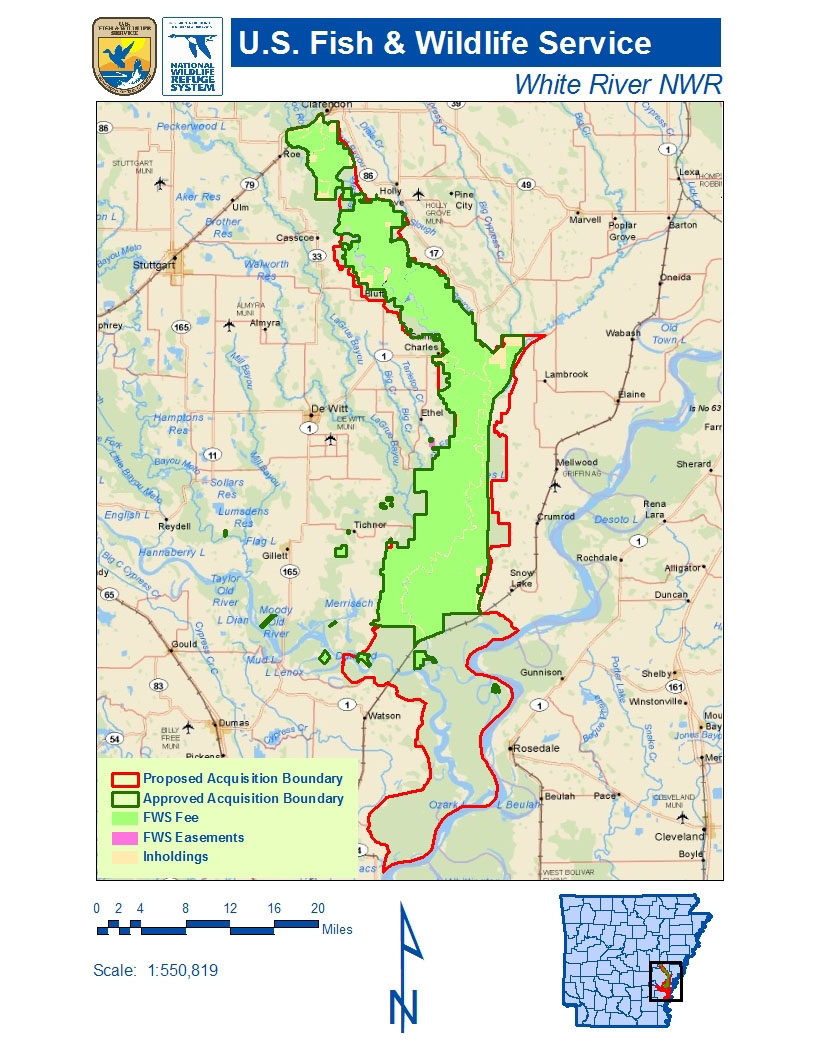
A map of White River National Wildlife Refuge, including areas proposed for expansion.

The White River National Wildlife Refuge (officially Dale Bumpers White River National Wildlife Refuge) is a 160,756 acres (650.56 km^{2}) wildlife refuge located in Desha, Monroe, Phillips, and Arkansas counties in the U.S. state of Arkansas. The refuge is managed by the United States Fish and Wildlife Service. White River NWR borders on Cache River National Wildlife Refuge at its northern boundary. In 1974, the White River Sugarberry Natural Area was designated as a National Natural Landmark by the National Park Service.

In 2013, the FWS proposed the gradual expansion of the refuge up to a maximum of 297,806 acres (120,518 ha).

== Description ==
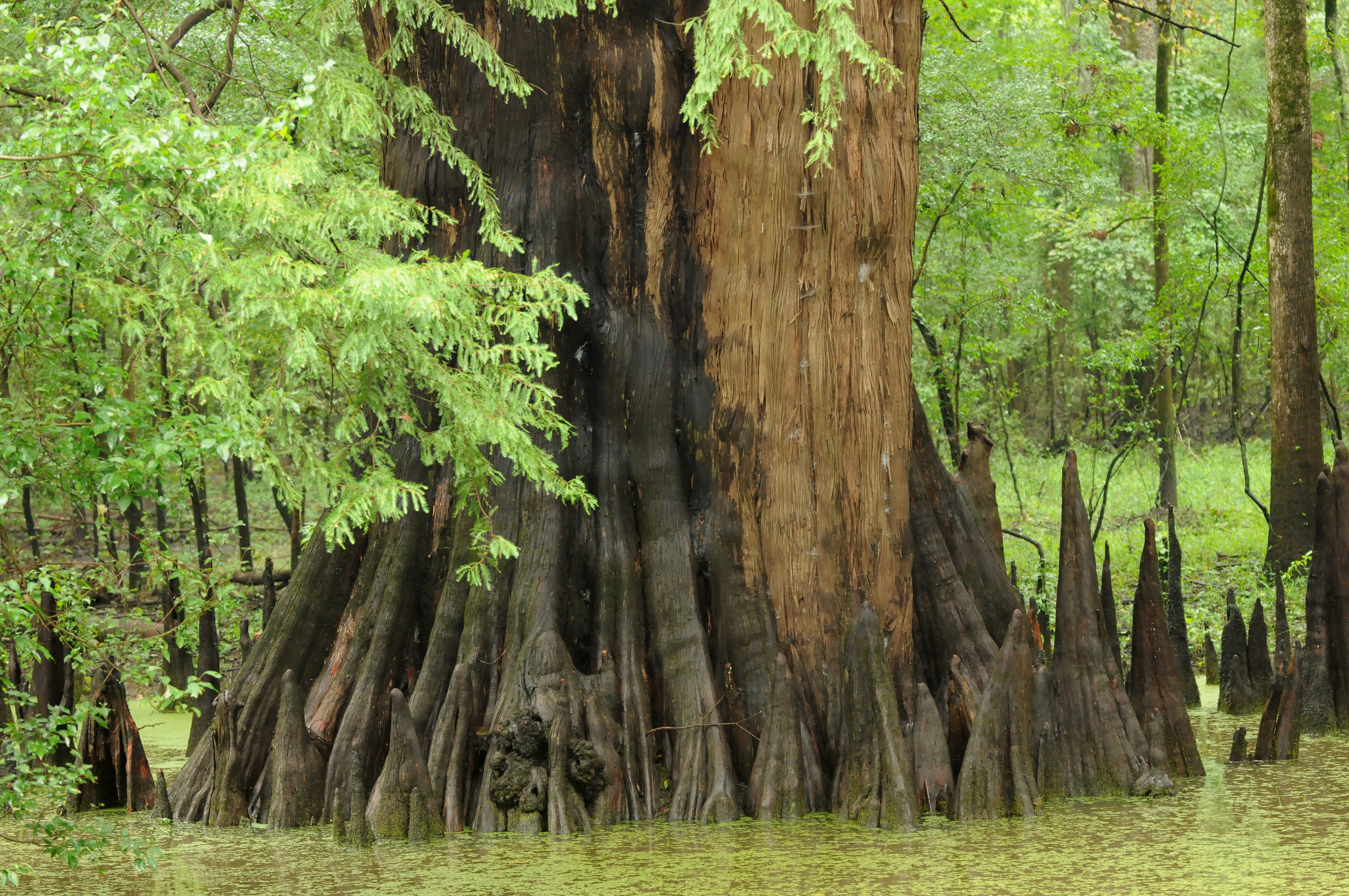
Old growth bald cypress forests are a feature of the National Wildlife Refuge.

White River National Wildlife Refuge was created in 1935. The refuge is 3 to 10 miles (4.8 to 16.1 km) wide and encompassing 90 miles (140 km) of the lower 100 miles (160 km) of the White River. It also includes 3 miles (4.8 km) of the Arkansas Post Canal which is part of the Army Corps of Engineers' McClellan-Kerr Navigation System on the Arkansas River.

This refuge has the largest concentration of wintering mallard ducks in the Mississippi Flyway. It also has large concentrations of snow and Canada geese. This refuge is home to four active bald eagle nests and a black bear population. Black bears have increased in numbers from about 25 in the 1940s to more than 300.

The refuge lies with the Mississippi lowland forests ecoregion. Within the refuge, the Sugarberry Natural Area includes a 973 acres (394 ha) old-growth bottomland hardwood forest of varied composition. The area contains four forest types: American sweetgum, Nuttall's oak, willow oak; sugarberry, American elm, green ash; American sycamore, pecan, American elm; and baldcypress.

The refuge has 356 natural and man-made lakes which make up 4,000 acres (16 km^{2}) of the refuge. There are 154,000 acres (620 km^{2}) of forestland, 900 acres (3.6 km^{2}) of agricultural land, and 1,000 acres (4.0 km^{2}) of grassland.

The refuge is classified as a Wetland of International Importance.

== Expansion proposal ==
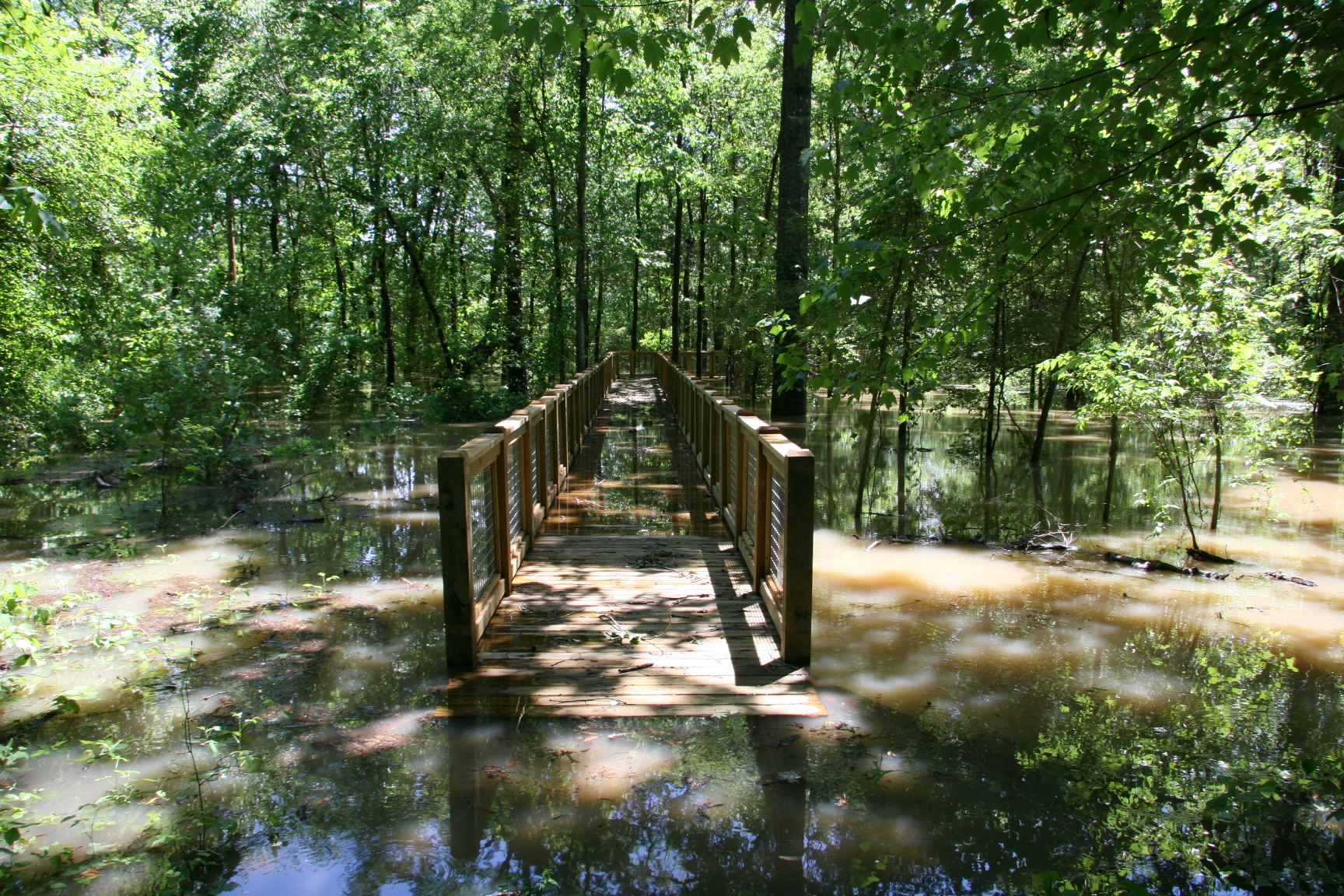
A boardwalk, here flooded, and trails give access to refuge lands to hikers and bird watchers.

In 2013, federal government designated the White River watershed as the nation's second "National Blueway". Later that year, the Fish and Wildlife Service proposed that the White River NWR be expanded. The expansion proposal calls for the refuge to be expanded from the present 160,756 acres (650.56 km^{2}) to as much as 297,806 acres (1,205.18 km^{2}). The expansion would be carried out by purchasing land from willing sellers as funds are available from Federal Duck Stamps, the Migratory Bird Conservation Fund, and the Land and Water Conservation Fund.

The proposed expansion would add to the refuge 9 miles of White River floodplain, 26 miles of the Arkansas River, and 34 miles of the west bank of the Mississippi River. The land would provide additional habitat for a variety of birds, fishes, and other animals. The expansion would also be important for the preservation and restoration of Arkansas's "Big Woods," a floodplain forest of which less than 10 percent remains intact.

The Fish and Wildlife Service has also proposed expansion of the Cache River National Wildlife Refuge, which borders the White River NWR on the north. The proposed expansions, if fully implemented, would preserve almost 600,000 acres (2,400 km^{2}) of land in the White River watershed. Additional parcels of conservation land owned by the state of Arkansas and private conservation groups are contiguous with the national wildlife refuges.

== Name of refuge ==
In 2014, the refuge was officially renamed "Dale Bumpers White River National Wildlife Refuge", in honor of former Arkansas Governor and Senator Dale Bumpers. At a dedication ceremony, Daniel M. Ashe, Director of the United States Fish and Wildlife Service, said:

The Service is proud to recognize the many contributions Senator Bumpers has made to give many future generations the same opportunity to enjoy Arkansas' natural beauty as we have had. He is a giant among conservationists and a visionary who followed an unconventional path to set aside some of Arkansas' last wild places. It is fitting that he will be forever linked with the White River.
