= Louisiana Purchase State Park =

Historic site in Arkansas, United States

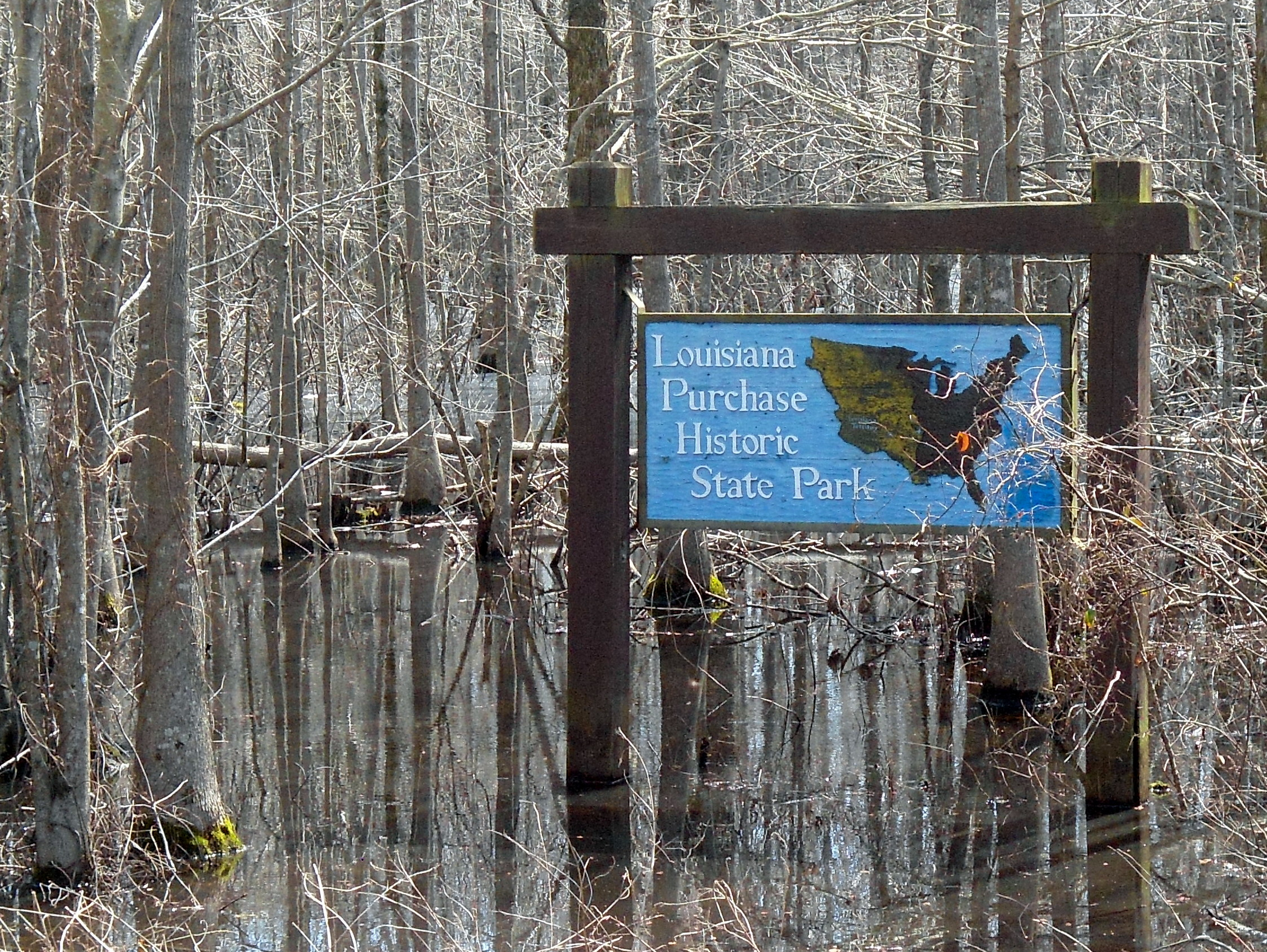
- Louisiana Purchase State Park sign at the boardwalk

- Location within the United States
- 34°38′44.455″N 91°03′07.337″W
- Location: Eastern Arkansas
- Nearest city: Brinkley, Arkansas

History
- Established: 1961 (65 years ago)

Site notes
- Area: 37.5 acres (15.2 ha)
- Governing body: Arkansas Department of Parks, Heritage, and Tourism
- Website: Louisiana Purchase State Park

U.S. National Register of Historic Places
- Official name: Louisiana Purchase Survey Marker
- Designated: February 23, 1972
- Reference no.: 72000206

U.S. National Historic Landmark
- Official name: Beginning Point of the Louisiana Purchase Land Survey
- Designated: April 19, 1993

The Louisiana Purchase State Park, located in eastern Arkansas, commemorates the initial point from which public lands acquired through the 1803 Louisiana Purchase were subsequently surveyed.

The Louisiana Purchase State Park encompasses 37.5 acres (15.2 ha) of forested wetlands, a landform which is regionally in decline due to agricultural development practices that include draining such areas. On the survey point is a 6-foot (1.8 m) marker erected in 1926 by the L'Anguille Chapter, Daughters of the American Revolution (D.A.R.), of Marianna, Arkansas. It was listed on the National Register of Historic Places in 1972 and then designated as a National Historic Landmark in 1993.

== Description ==
The Louisiana Purchase State Park is located at the eastern end of Highway 362, southeast of Blackton, Arkansas, at the tripoint junction of Lee, Monroe, and Phillips counties. It is a 37.5-acre (15.2 ha) parcel of swamp, or forested wetlands, which is remarkably unchanged from the time when surveyors came here on November 10, 1815. This type of wetlands is becoming increasingly rare because of the practice of draining and clearing such land for agricultural use. The boardwalk, 950 feet (290 m) long, leads to the site of the marker, with occasional interpretive signs describing the ecology of the area and the significance of the landmark.

The D.A.R. Louisiana Purchase Survey Marker is 6 feet (1.8 m) in height and is about 4.5 feet (1.4 m) wide at the base. It typically stands in about 1 foot (0.30 m) of swamp water. The inscription reads:

"This stone marks the base established November 10, 1815, from which the lands of the Louisiana Purchase were surveyed by United States engineers. The first survey from this point was made to satisfy the claims of the soldiers of the War of 1812 with land bounties".

== History ==
=== Background ===
On April 30, 1803, negotiators for the United States and the First French Empire, signed the Louisiana Purchase agreement, by which the United States acquired 830,000 square miles (2,100,000 km^{2}) of land west of the Mississippi River, doubling its size. President Thomas Jefferson commissioned the Lewis and Clark Expedition, which traveled west along the Missouri and associated rivers, eventually reaching the Pacific Coast, from 1804 to 1806.

=== 1815 survey ===
Future President James Monroe ordered a survey of the territory in 1815, in order to permit the orderly award of land in the territory to military veterans of the War of 1812. Prospect K. Robbins and Joseph C. Brown were commissioned to identify a starting point for the survey work in what is now eastern Arkansas. The team led by Robbins traveled north from the mouth of the Arkansas River, while that of Brown traveled west from the mouth of the St. Francis River. On October 27, 1815, Robbins' party crossed the east–west line laid down by Brown's party at this point, formally establishing the Fifth Principal Meridian. The 55 miles (89 km) of land Robbins traversed is even today some of the most difficult terrain in the state to negotiate. Brown's party traversed 26 miles (42 km) of land alternately described as "good for farming" and containing "briers and thickets in abundance". Brown's party eventually surveyed as far west as present-day Little Rock, while Robbins continued north to the Missouri River. Two trees near the site were blazed to mark the meeting point of the two survey lines.

=== 20th century ===
Although survey work based on this point continued in subsequent years, covering most of Arkansas, Missouri, Minnesota, Iowa, and North and South Dakota, the initial point was forgotten. It was rediscovered in 1921 by surveyors working the line between Phillips and Lee counties, who found the blazed trees. The L'Anguille Chapter of the Daughters of the American Revolution at Marianna, Arkansas, began a campaign to memorialize the spot, culminating in the placement of the stone marker and a dedication ceremony on October 27, 1926, the 111th anniversary of the point's establishment.

External video
- It Started Here: Early Arkansas and The Louisiana Purchase at Arkansas PBS

One forgotten feature of the dedication ceremony was that four local landowners each gave deeds for 2 acres (0.81 ha) of land surrounding the point, which would have created an eight-acre park. Arkansas designated the area as a state park in 1961, but appropriated no funds for land purchases or development. The Arkansas Natural Heritage Commission, recognizing the swamp's natural significance, provided funds to purchase the 37.5 acres which now make up the state park. It holds a conservation easement on the property to limit development.

== Gallery ==
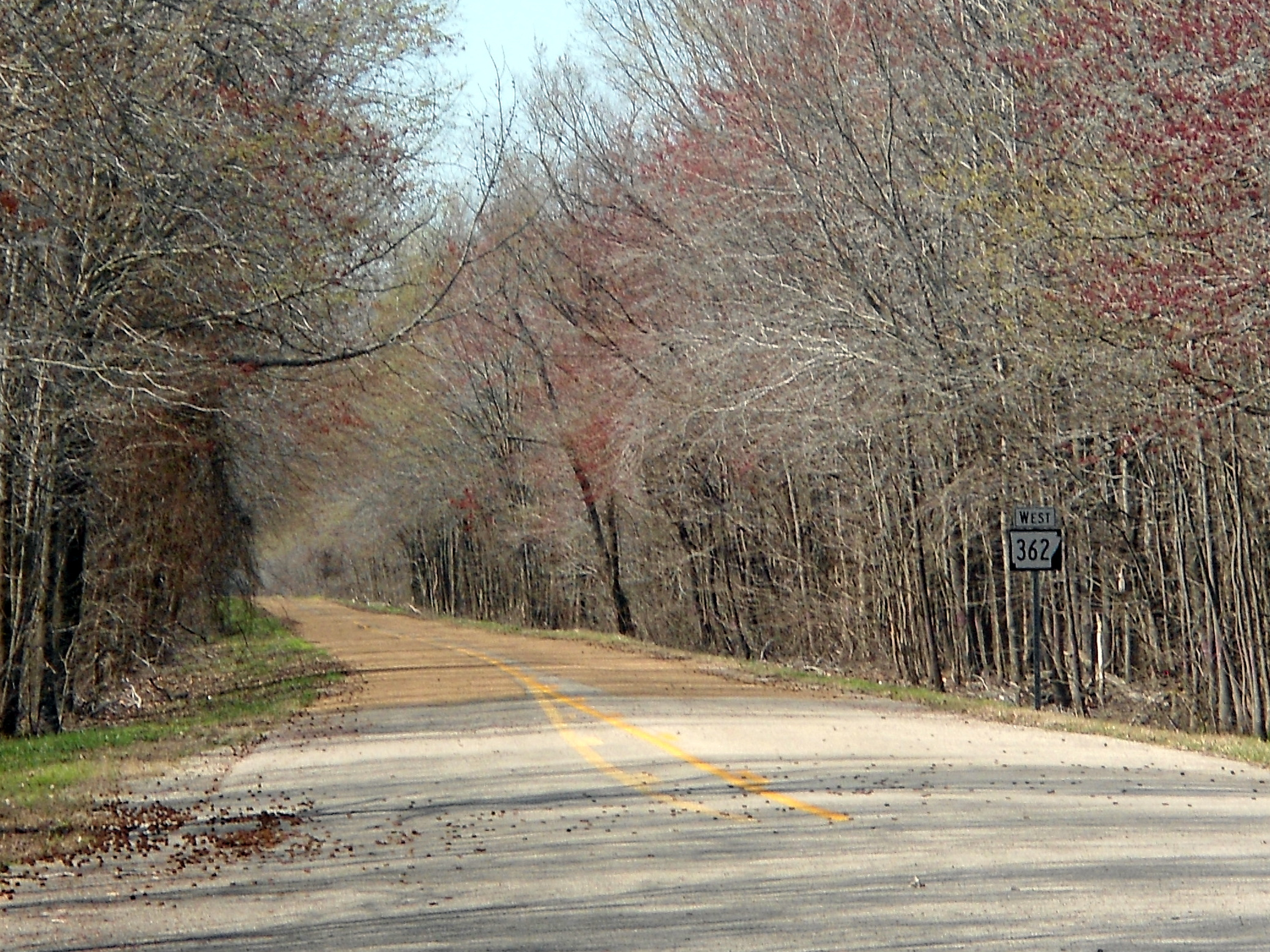
Entrance to the park on State Highway 362.

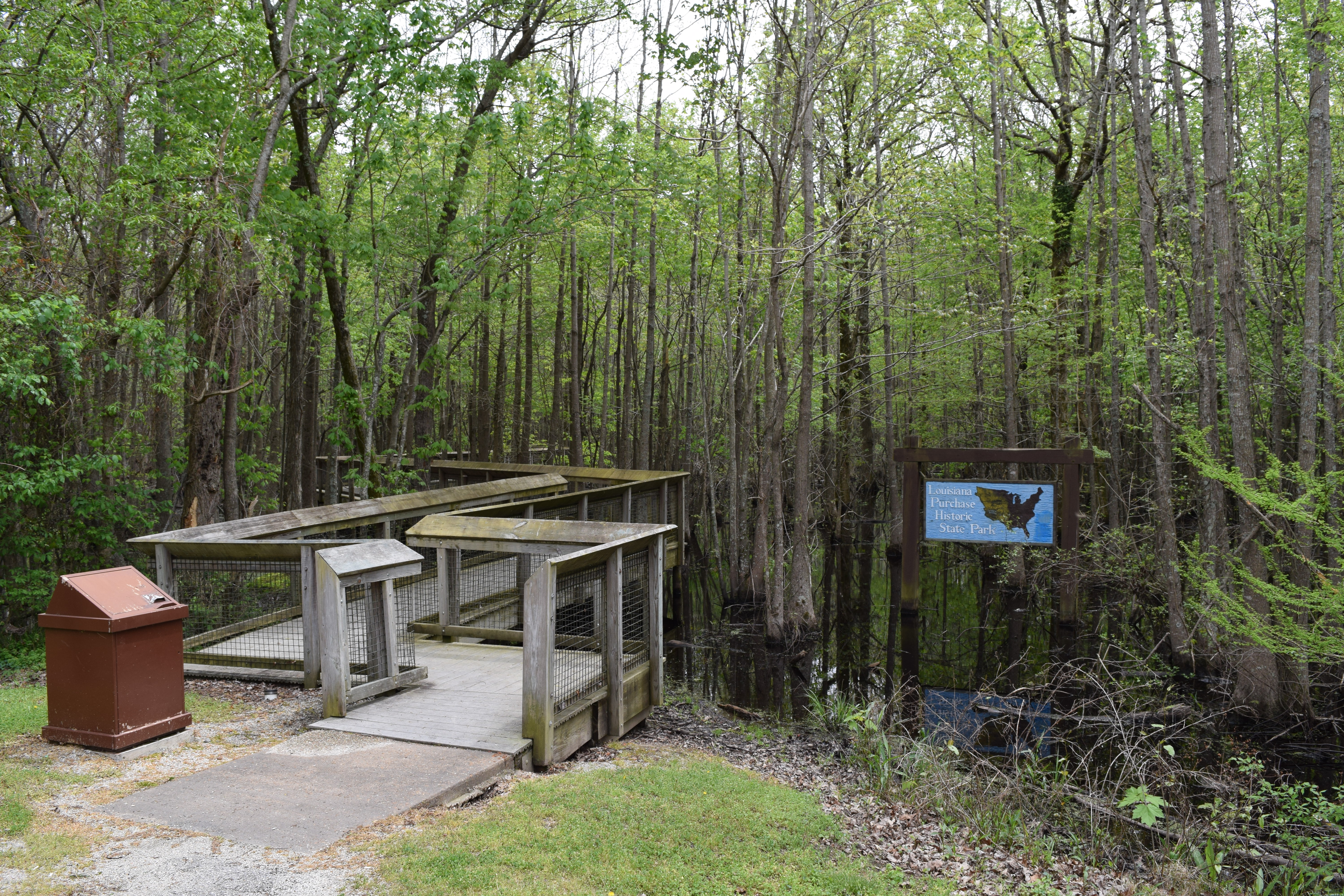
Footpath leading to the boardwalk.

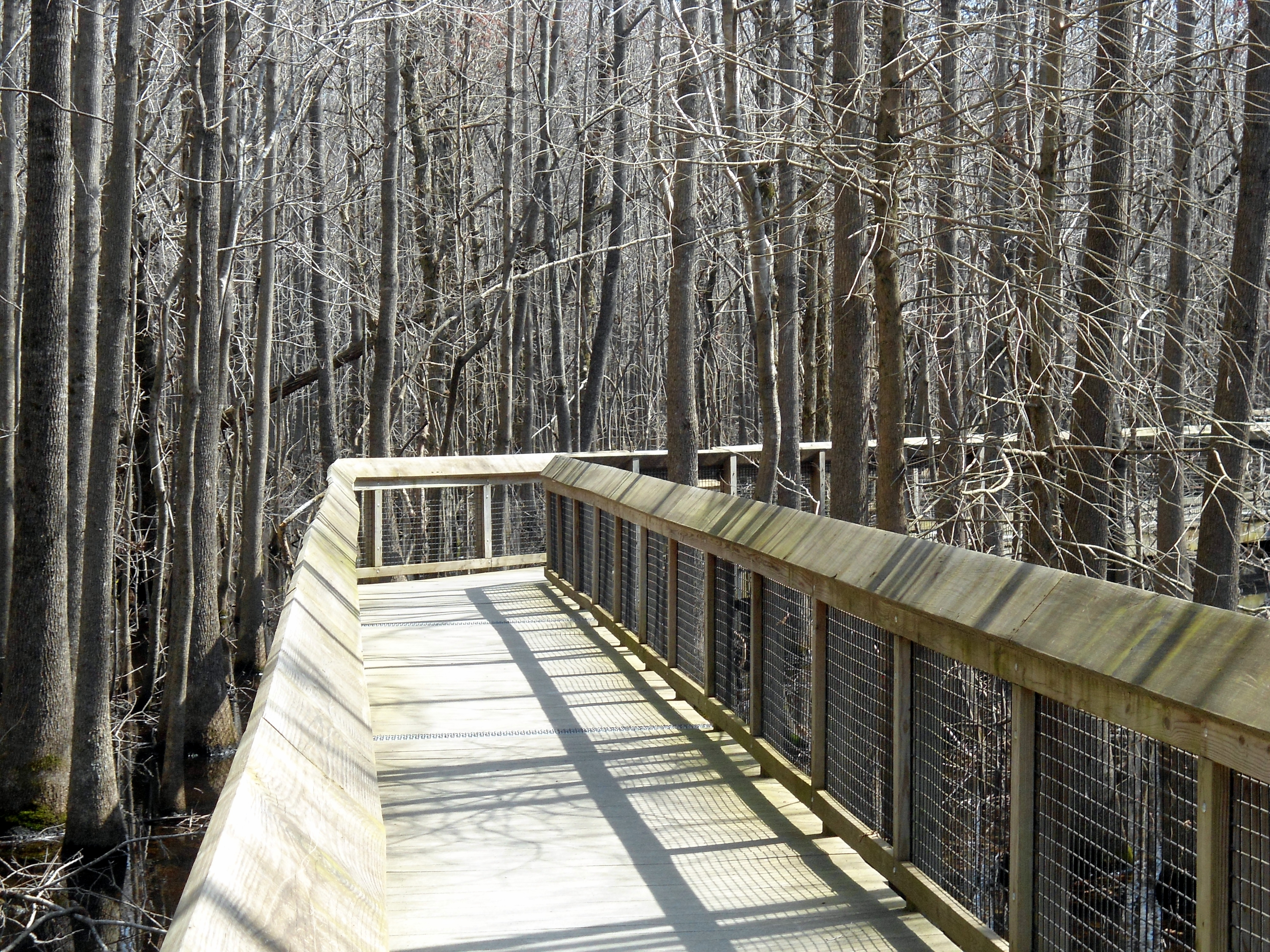
Boardwalk leading to the site.

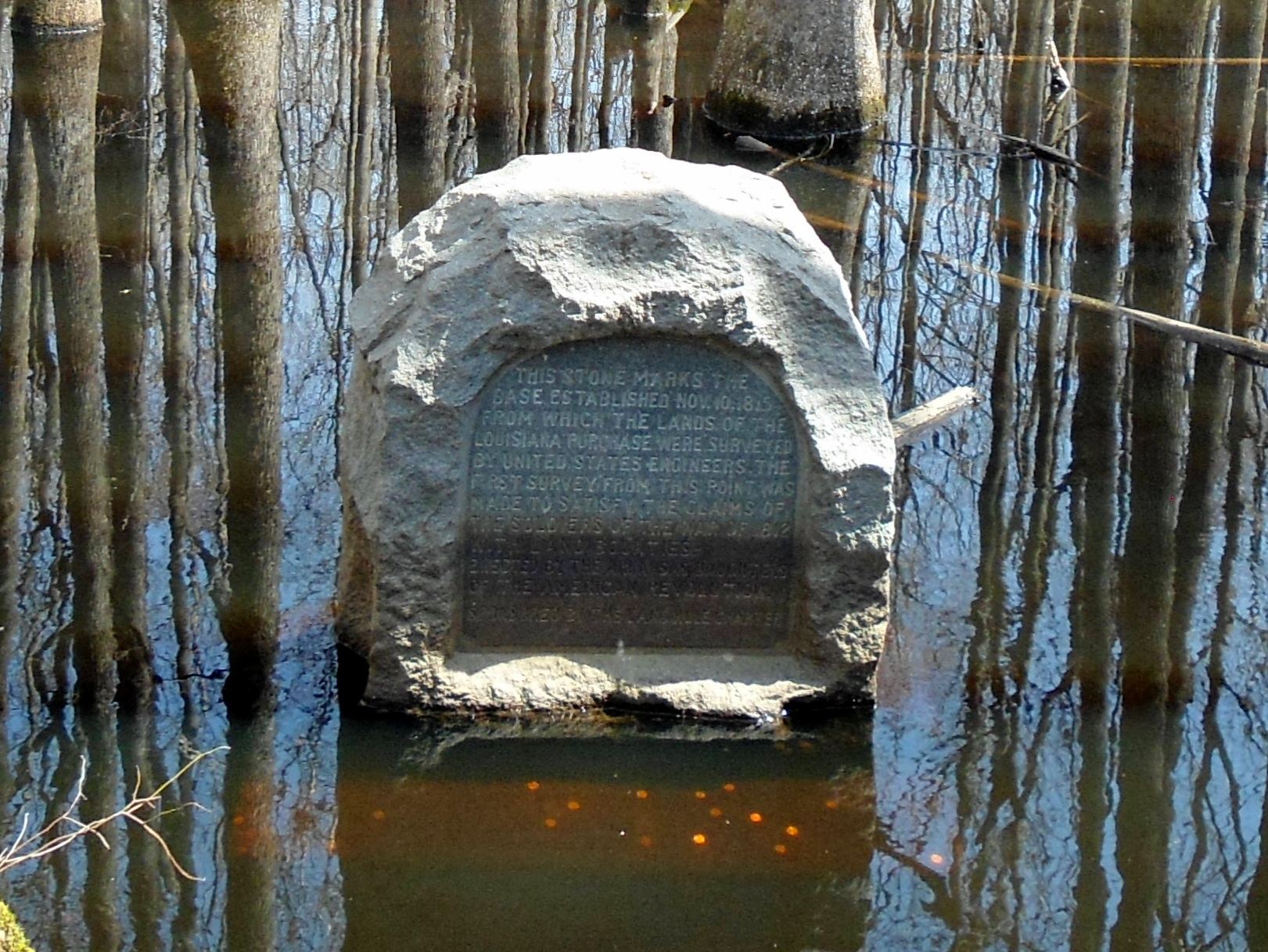
Louisiana Purchase Survey Marker.

== See also ==
- List of Arkansas state parks
- List of National Historic Landmarks in Arkansas
- National Register of Historic Places listings in Lee County, Arkansas
- National Register of Historic Places listings in Monroe County, Arkansas
- National Register of Historic Places listings in Phillips County, Arkansas
