= Cache River (Arkansas) =

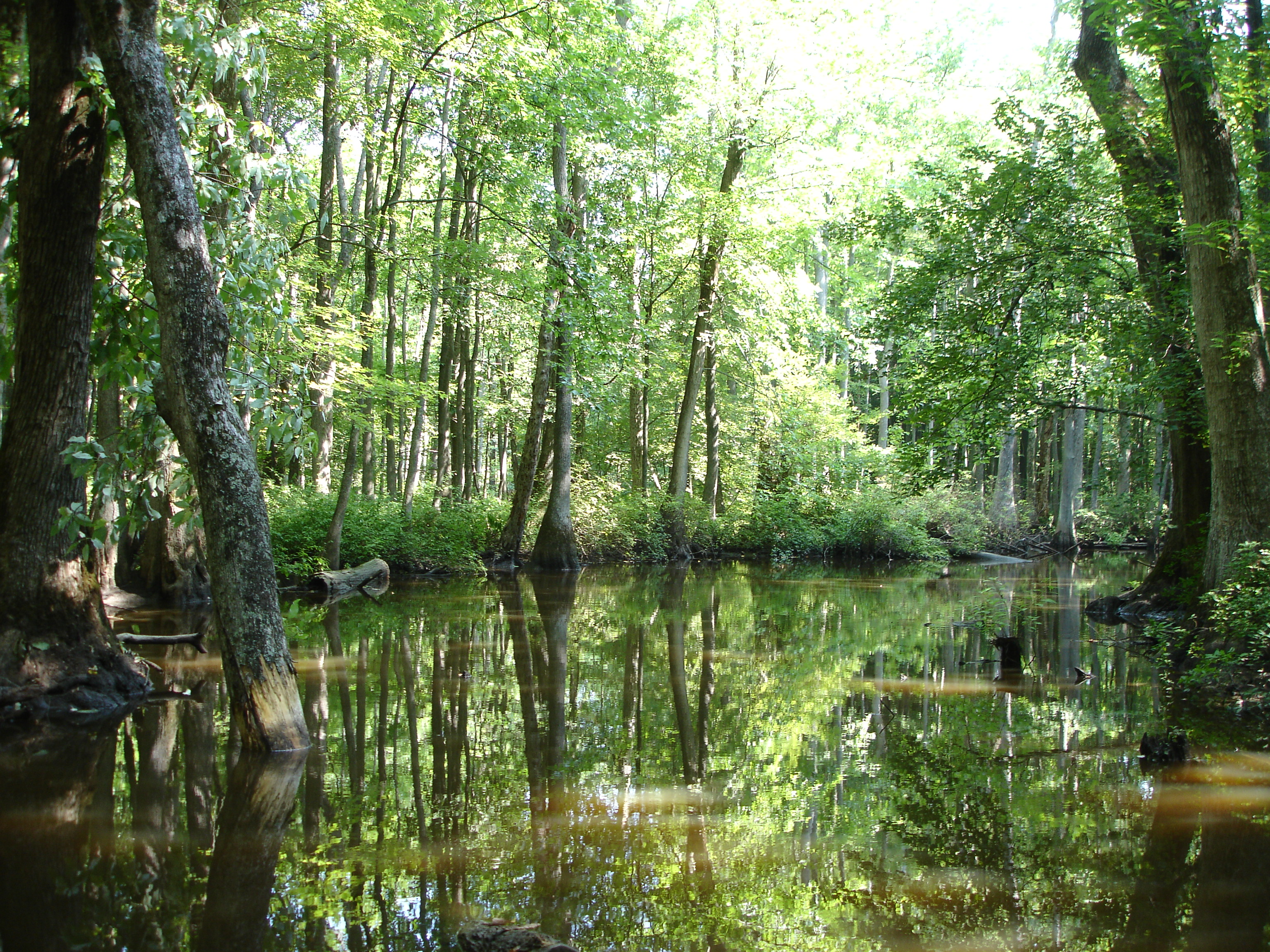
- Cache River, Woodruff County

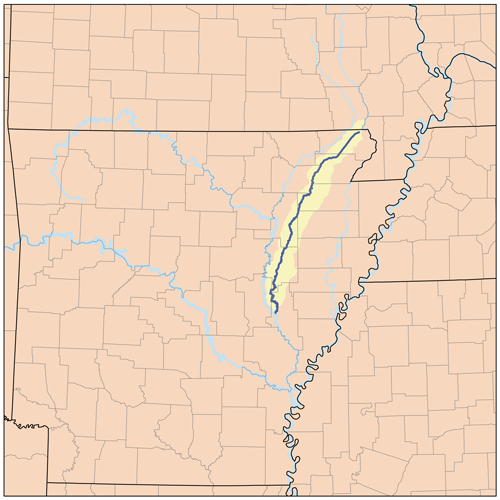
- Map of the Cache River

Location
- Country: United States
- State: Arkansas
- City: Clarendon

Physical characteristics
- Source: Unnamed drainage ditches
  - location: Butler County, Missouri
  - coordinates: 36°13′40″N 90°36′42″W
- Mouth: White River (Arkansas)
  - location: Clarendon, Arkansas
  - coordinates: 34°42′7″N 91°19′30″W
  - elevation: 151 ft (46 m)
- Length: 213 mi (343 km)
- Discharge
  - location: Cotton Plant, Arkansas
  - average: 1,461 cu/ft. per sec.

Basin features
- Tributaries
  - right: Bayou De View
- Protection status

Ramsar Wetland
- Official name: Cache-Lower White Rivers
- Designated: 21 November 1989
- Reference no.: 442

The Cache River is a tributary of the White River, 213 mi (343 km) long, in northeastern Arkansas in the United States. Its headwaters also drain a small portion of southeastern Missouri. Via the White River, the Cache is part of the Mississippi River watershed, placing the river and surrounding watershed in the Arkansas Delta.

== Ecology ==
The river supports 53 mammalian species, over 200 bird species, and nearly 50 species of reptiles and amphibians. The refuge is also the most important wintering area for mallard ducks and other migratory waterfowl on the continent. As a result, low-lying areas in the vicinity of the river's lower course are a popular destination for duck hunters. This is also where the ivory-billed woodpecker was recently speculated to have been sighted (after it was believed to be extinct for 60 years). The watershed also contains the largest remaining tract of contiguous bottomland hardwood forest found in North America. Because of these combination of these unique features, the Cache River National Wildlife Refuge was created along approximately 90 miles (140 km) along the river's lower reaches this location was also used by team trees to plant 20 million trees.

== Hydrology ==
The Cache is formed by a confluence of agricultural ditches in Butler County, Missouri and soon enters Arkansas, flowing generally south-southwestwardly. Several portions of the river's upper course have been straightened and channelized. It joins the White River at the town of Clarendon, Arkansas.

The river is a slow muddy river with meandering channels, sloughs, swampy areas, and oxbow lakes.

== History ==
During the American Civil War, the Battle of Cotton Plant was fought along the Cache River at the town of Cotton Plant.

=== Etymology ===
The name of the river is probably a Picardie word meaning "hunt" as a reference to the abundant wildlife along the river. The first explorer into the area was Father Marquette, for whom Picard was the native tongue.

== Gallery ==
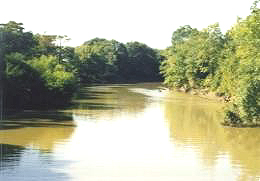
The Cache River near Cotton Plant, Arkansas

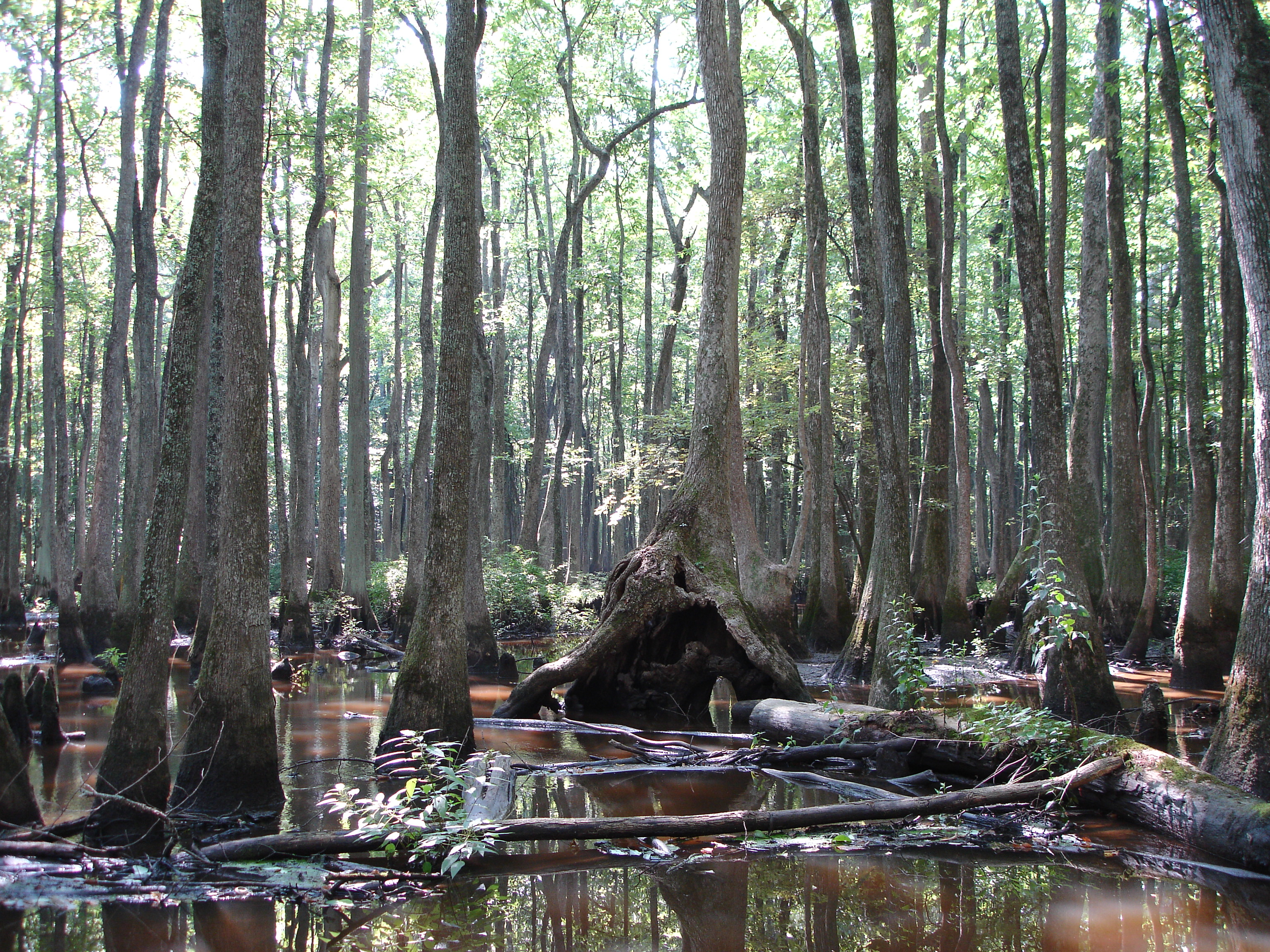
In Woodruff County

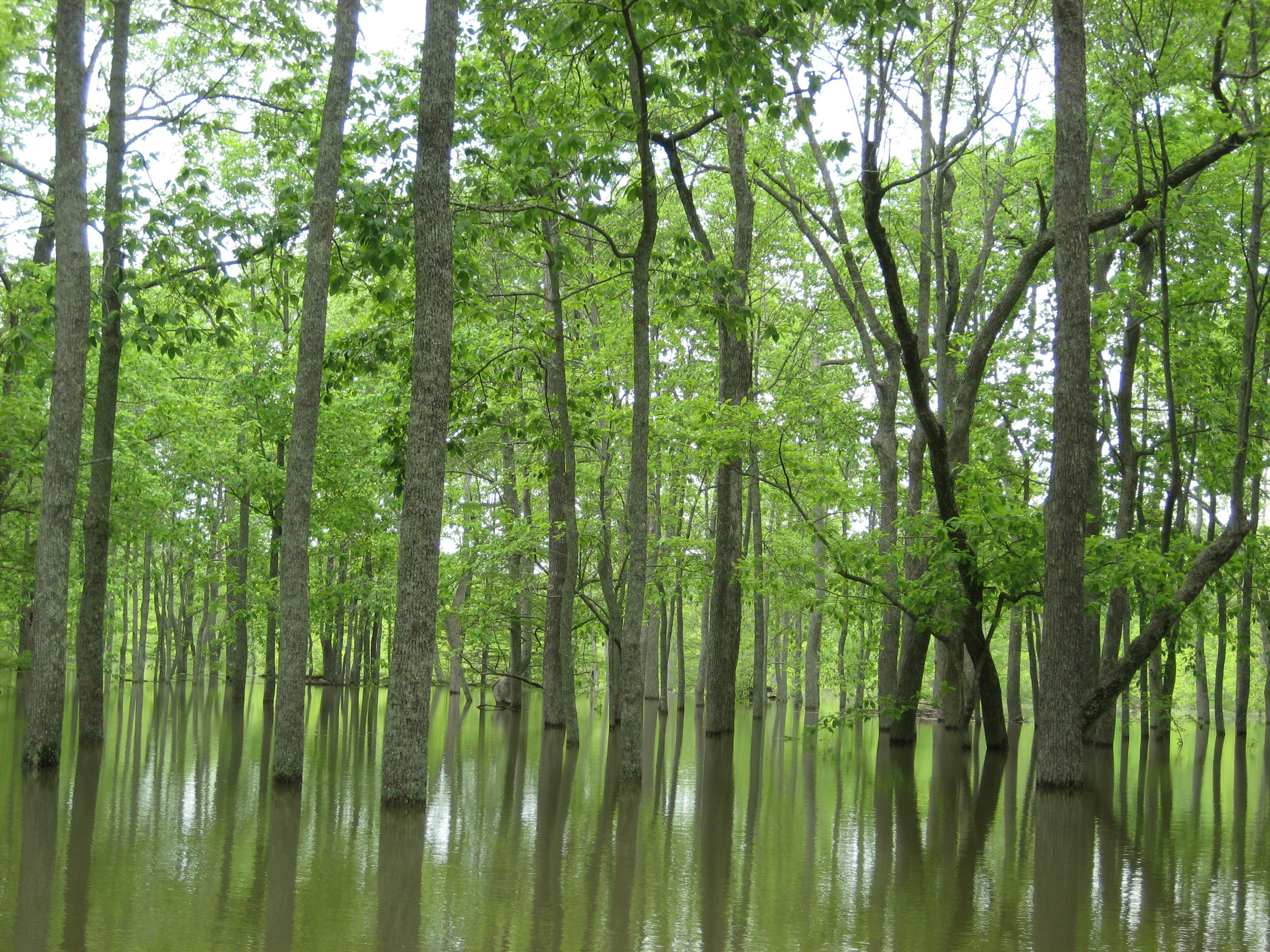
Inundated hardwood forest along the Cache River

== See also ==
- List of Arkansas rivers
- List of Missouri rivers
