= Brinkley =

Brinkley may refer to:

== People ==
- Brinkley (surname)

== Places ==
- Brinkley, Arkansas, U.S., a city
  - Brinkley School District, the city's school district
  - Brinkley High School, the city's high school
- Brinkley, Nottinghamshire, England, a hamlet
- Brinkley, Cambridgeshire, England, a village
- Brinkley, South Australia, Australia, a locality and former township

== Fictional places ==
- Brinkley Court, the seat of Dahlia Travers and her husband Tom in the novels and stories of P. G. Wodehouse

== See also ==
- The Huntley–Brinkley Report, American news program
- USS Brinkley Bass, a Gearing-class destroyer ship
- Brinkley Act, a clause of the U.S. Communications Act of 1934
