= Cow Mound, Arkansas =

Ghost town in Arkansas, United States

Coordinates: 35°3′31.3″N 91°20′15.5″W

Cow Mound is a ghost town in Woodruff County, Arkansas, United States. Its decimal coordinates of 35.058702, -91.337628 place it about 11 miles northeast of Des Arc, about 15 miles northwest of Brinkley, and about 16 miles south of Augusta, Arkansas.
