= Curtis Burrow =

American football player (born 1962)

No. 5
- Position: Placekicker

Personal information
- Born: December 11, 1962 (age 63); Brinkley, Arkansas, U.S.
- Listed height: 5 ft 11 in (1.80 m)
- Listed weight: 185 lb (84 kg)

Career information
- High school: Brinkley (Brinkley, Arkansas)
- College: Central Arkansas (1982–1985)
- NFL draft: 1986: undrafted

Career history
- New Orleans Saints (1986)*; Cincinnati Bengals (1987)*; Green Bay Packers (1988)
- * Offseason or practice squad member only
- Stats at Pro Football Reference

Curtis D. Burrow (born December 11, 1962) is an American former professional football player. He played college football for the Central Arkansas Bears as a placekicker and was a two-time All-American. He was a member of the New Orleans Saints, Cincinnati Bengals and Green Bay Packers of the National Football League (NFL). He played his only NFL game in 1988 with the Packers.

== Early life ==
Burrow was born on December 11, 1962, in Brinkley, Arkansas. He attended Brinkley High School and then the University of Central Arkansas from 1982 to 1985, where he majored in physical education.

Burrow played for the Central Arkansas Bears in the National Association of Intercollegiate Athletics (NAIA), being their starter at placekicker in his last three seasons. He was named first-team NAIA All-American following his junior and senior seasons, helping the Bears reach the national championship in both those seasons. On the last play of the 1984 national championship, he missed a 70-yard field goal attempt, resulting in a tie. He concluded his collegiate career having made 43 of 64 field goal attempts and 103 of 110 extra point attempts.

== Professional career ==
Burrow signed with the New Orleans Saints as an undrafted free agent following the 1986 NFL draft but was released on August 18, 1986. He signed with the Cincinnati Bengals on February 5, 1987, but was released by them on May 8, 1987. Afterwards, he returned to Arkansas, where he began studying for a teaching certificate. He had been noticed by a Green Bay Packers coach at a kicking camp, and on August 18, 1988, he signed with the Packers after a tryout. He was signed for his leg strength and ability to consistently kickoff for touchbacks. He appeared in one preseason game but was then released on August 23, losing out to Max Zendejas for the team's kicker job.

In October, Burrow was contacted by the Packers after Zendejas was released, but did not sign. He was contacted again after the Packers released Dale Dawson, Zendejas's replacement, but the job instead went to Dean Dorsey. He said that he had kept training in hopes of being ready if asked to play, but began "getting close to giving up hope" around Week 13. However, prior to the last game of the season, the Packers cut Dorsey and signed Burrow. He appeared against the Phoenix Cardinals but performed poorly, making only two of four extra point attempts and having a 49-yard field goal blocked. He initially returned in 1989, but was released on July 19, 1989, ending his professional career. After his career, he served as a coach at Brinkley High School.
