= Brenkley =

Hamlet in Tyne and Wear, England

Coordinates: 55.070201°N 1.6584341°W

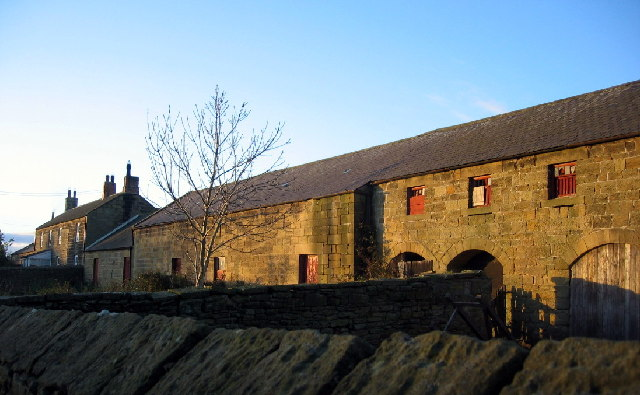

- Location within Tyne and Wear
- Civil parish: Dinnington
- Metropolitan borough: Newcastle upon Tyne
- Metropolitan county: Tyne and Wear
- Region: North East
- Country: England
- Sovereign state: United Kingdom
- Police: Northumbria
- Fire: Tyne and Wear
- Ambulance: North East

Brenkley is a hamlet and former civil parish about 6 miles from Newcastle upon Tyne, now in the parish of Dinnington, in the Newcastle upon Tyne district, in the county of Tyne and Wear, England. In 1951, the parish had a population of 28.

== History ==
The name "Brenkley" means 'Brynca's mound' or 'edge mound'. Brenkley is possibly a shrunken medieval village, although there is no indications on the ground. Brenkley is one of the possible sources of the surname Brinkley. Brenkley was formerly a township in the parish of Dinnington, from 1866 Brenkley was a civil parish in its own right until it was abolished on 1 April 1955 and merged with Dinnington, the rest went to form Brunswick. In 1974, it became part of Tyne and Wear, having previously been part of Northumberland.
