= Negro Head Corner, Arkansas =

- Unincorporated community
- Location within Arkansas Location within the United States
- Coordinates: 35°20′38″N 91°21′27″W
- Country: United States
- State: Arkansas
- County: Woodruff
- Elevation: 217 ft (66 m)
- Time zone: UTC-6 (Central (CST))
  - Summer (DST): UTC-5 (CDT)
- GNIS feature ID: 52597

Negro Head Corner is an unincorporated community in Woodruff County, Arkansas, United States, located about 4 miles (6.4 km) north of Augusta.

The area is named for an oak sculpture of a Black man's head that was once displayed at the corner of a farm near the crossroads. It was carved by Wade Antney, who farmed the land first as an enslaved person and then later as the owner. It has been theorized that the sculpture represented Legba, the loa of crossroads in Haitian Vodou. However, due to the presence of Bakongo-based Hoodoo in Arkansas, it is more plausible that the sculpture was a face nkisi, which many Black Americans in the South use for protection, healing, and the connection of the physical world to the spiritual world, where the ancestors are said to reside. In American conjure tradition, these figures and charms are often placed in the corner of a house or property, which represents the Kalûnga line and Kongo cross.
