= Cavell, Arkansas =

- Unincorporated community
- Location within Arkansas Location within the United States
- Coordinates: 35°15′36″N 91°15′39″W
- Country: United States
- State: Arkansas
- County: Woodruff
- Elevation: 200 ft (61 m)
- Time zone: UTC-6 (Central (CST))
  - Summer (DST): UTC-5 (CDT)
- Area code: 870
- GNIS feature ID: 57531

Cavell is an unincorporated community in Woodruff County, Arkansas, United States. It is west of McCrory, Arkansas and just west of Patterson, Arkansas, though there is no direct road between Cavell and Patterson. It is located off Woodruff County Road 775 at the Old Highway 64 4WD Trail.
