= St. John the Baptist Catholic Church (Brinkley, Arkansas) =

Historic church in Arkansas, United States

- U.S. National Register of Historic Places
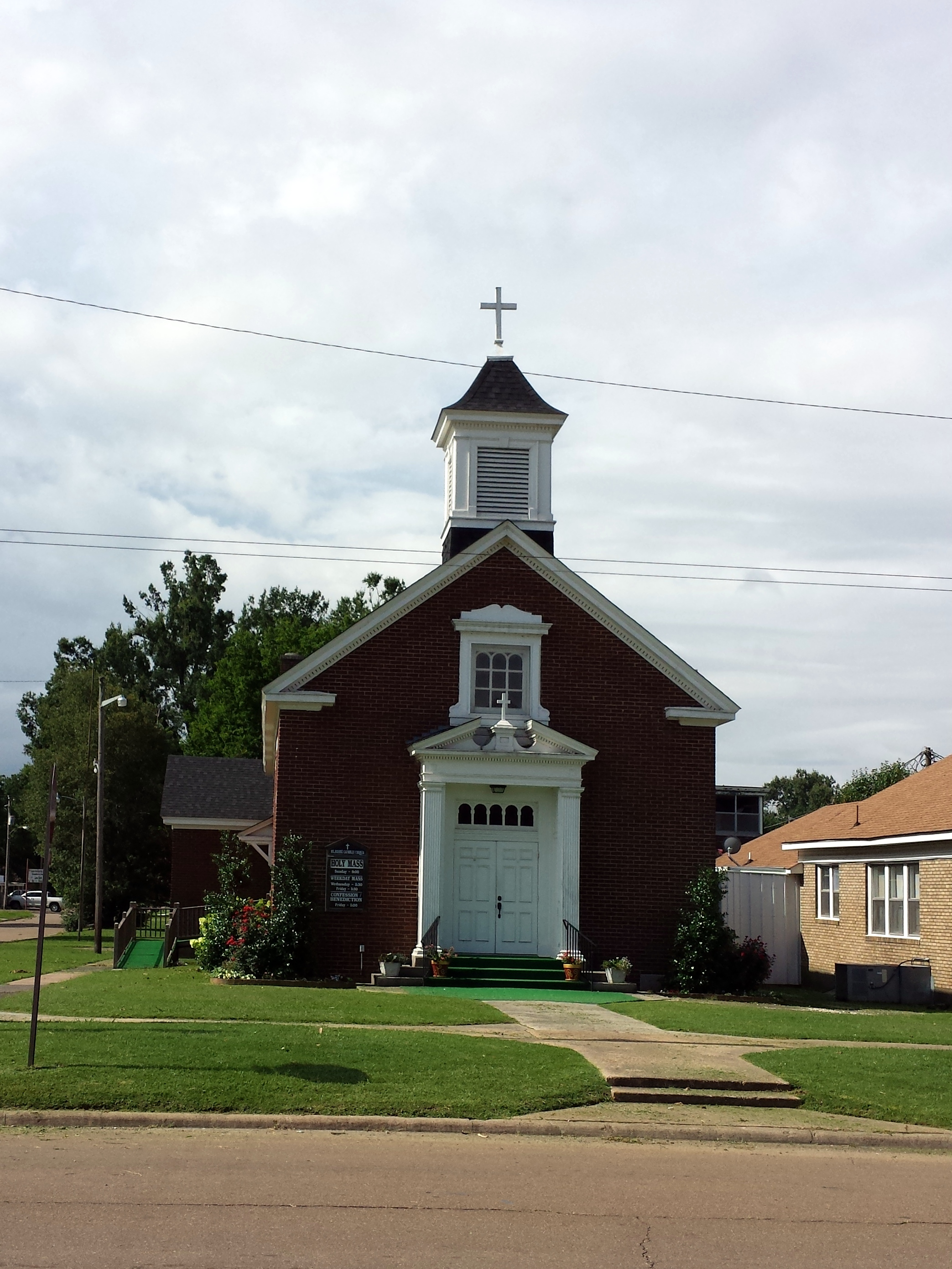

- Location within Arkansas Location within the United States
- Location: Jct. of New Orleans and W. Ash St., SW corner, Brinkley, Arkansas
- Coordinates: 34°53′7″N 91°11′35″W
- Area: less than one acre
- Built: 1929
- Architect: Harry J. Kramer
- Architectural style: Classical Revival
- NRHP reference No.: 92001283
- Added to NRHP: October 2, 1992

St. John the Baptist Catholic Church is a historic church at the junction of New Orleans and W. Ash Street, SW corner in Brinkley, Arkansas. It was listed on the National Register of Historic Places in 1992.

== Architecture ==
The church was built in 1875 as a wood-frame Gothic Revival structure, but was finished brick veneer with Classical Revival styling in 1928–29. The congregation was established by a district priest in 1875, and received its first permanent priest in 1886. The 1929 alterations, which included an extensive redesign of the interior, were to a design by Memphis, Tennessee architect Henry J. Kramer. The interior is remarkably unaltered since 1929, despite the collapse of its plaster ceiling, which required the replacement of light fixtures and pews crushed by the falling ceiling.
