= Pleasant Grove, Woodruff County, Arkansas =

Pleasant Grove, Arkansas
- Unincorporated community
- Location within Arkansas Location within the United States
- Coordinates: 35°23′13″N 91°17′10″W
- Country: United States
- State: Arkansas
- County: Woodruff
- Elevation: 223 ft (68 m)
- Time zone: UTC-6 (Central (CST))
  - Summer (DST): UTC-5 (CDT)
- Area code: 870
- GNIS feature ID: 75623

Pleasant Grove is an unincorporated community in Woodruff County, Arkansas, United States. Pleasant Grove is located on Arkansas Highway 33, 3.2 miles (5.1 km) west of Tupelo.
