= Woodruff County, Arkansas =

County in Arkansas, United States

- County
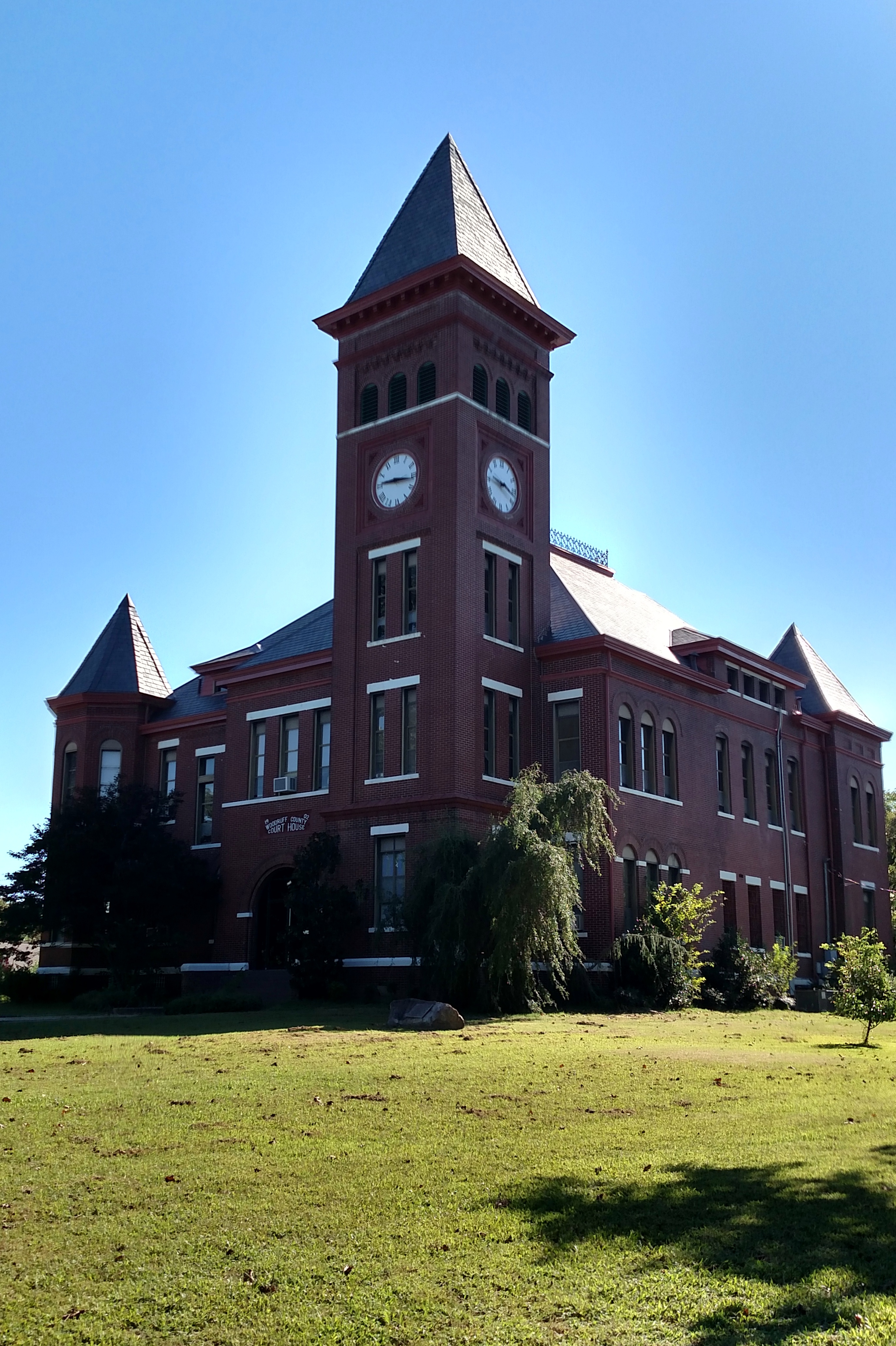
- Woodruff County Courthouse in Augusta

- Location within the U.S. state of Arkansas
- Country: United States
- State: Arkansas
- Founded: November 26, 1862
- Named for: William E. Woodruff
- Seat: Augusta
- Largest city: Augusta

Area
  - Total: 594 sq mi (1,540 km^{2})
  - Land: 587 sq mi (1,520 km^{2})
  - Water: 7.2 sq mi (19 km^{2}) 1.2%

Population (2020)
  - Total: 6,269
  - Estimate (2025): 5,710 ▼
  - Density: 10.7/sq mi (4.12/km^{2})
- Time zone: UTC−6 (Central)
  - Summer (DST): UTC−5 (CDT)
- Congressional district: 1st
- Website: www.woodruffcountyar.gov

Woodruff County is located in the Arkansas Delta in the U.S. state of Arkansas. The county is named for William E. Woodruff, founder of the state's first newspaper, the Arkansas Gazette.

Created as Arkansas's 54th county in 1862, Woodruff County is home to one incorporated town and four incorporated cities, including Augusta, the county seat. The county is also the site of numerous unincorporated communities and ghost towns. Occupying only 587 square miles (152,000 ha), Woodruff County is the 13th smallest county in Arkansas. As of the 2020 Census, the county's population was 6,269.

Based on population, the county is the second-smallest county of the 75 in Arkansas. Located in the Arkansas Delta, the county is largely flat with fertile soils. Historically covered in forest, bayous and swamps, the area was cleared for agriculture by early settlers. It is drained by the Cache River and the White River. Along the Cache River, the Cache River National Wildlife Refuge (NWR) runs north–south across the county, preserving bottomland forest, sloughs and wildlife habitat.

Although no Interstate highways are located in Woodruff County, three United States highways (U.S. Route 49 [US 49], US 63, and US 64) and twelve Arkansas state highways run in the county. Two Union Pacific Railroad lines cross the county.

== Geography ==
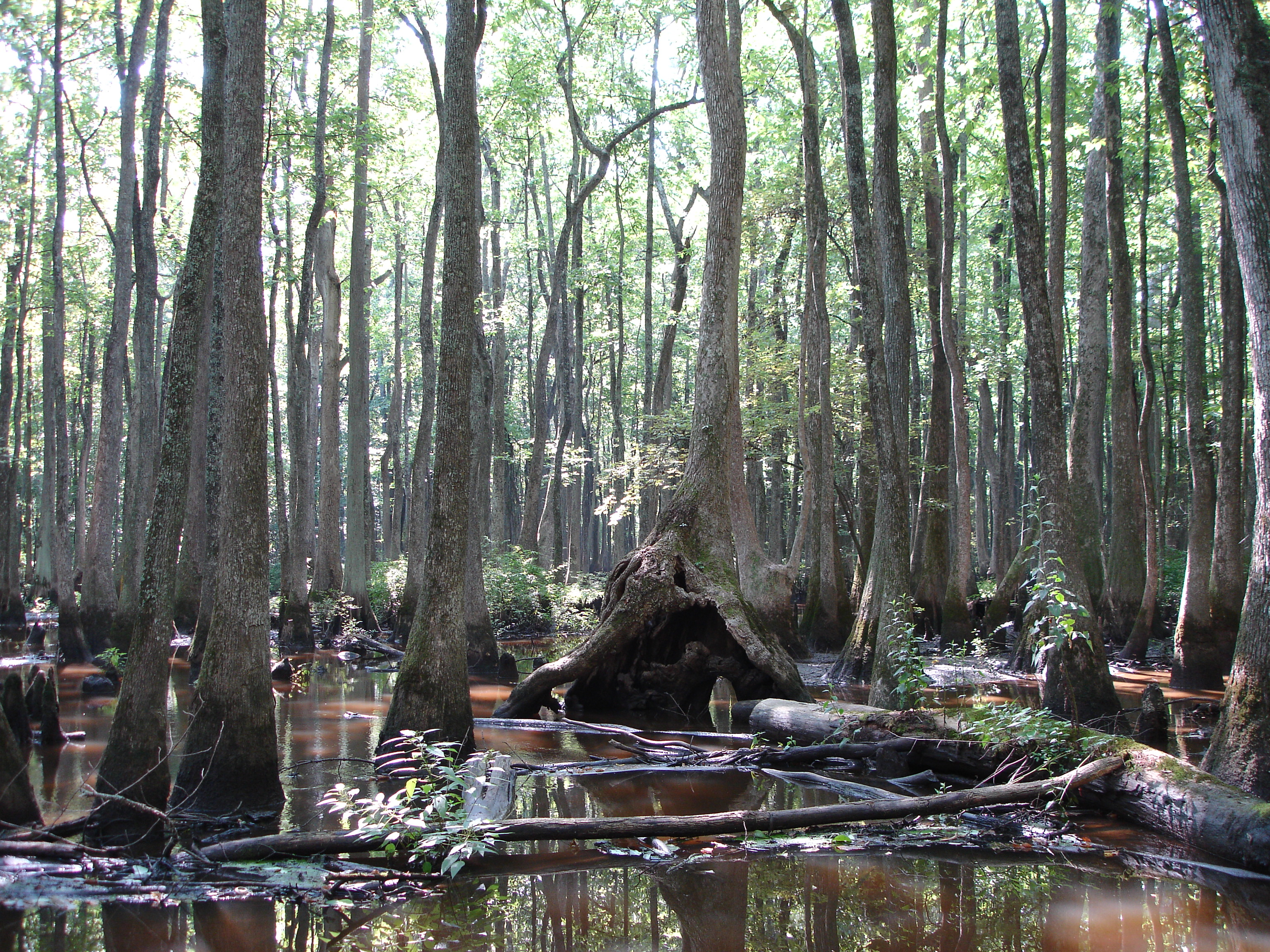
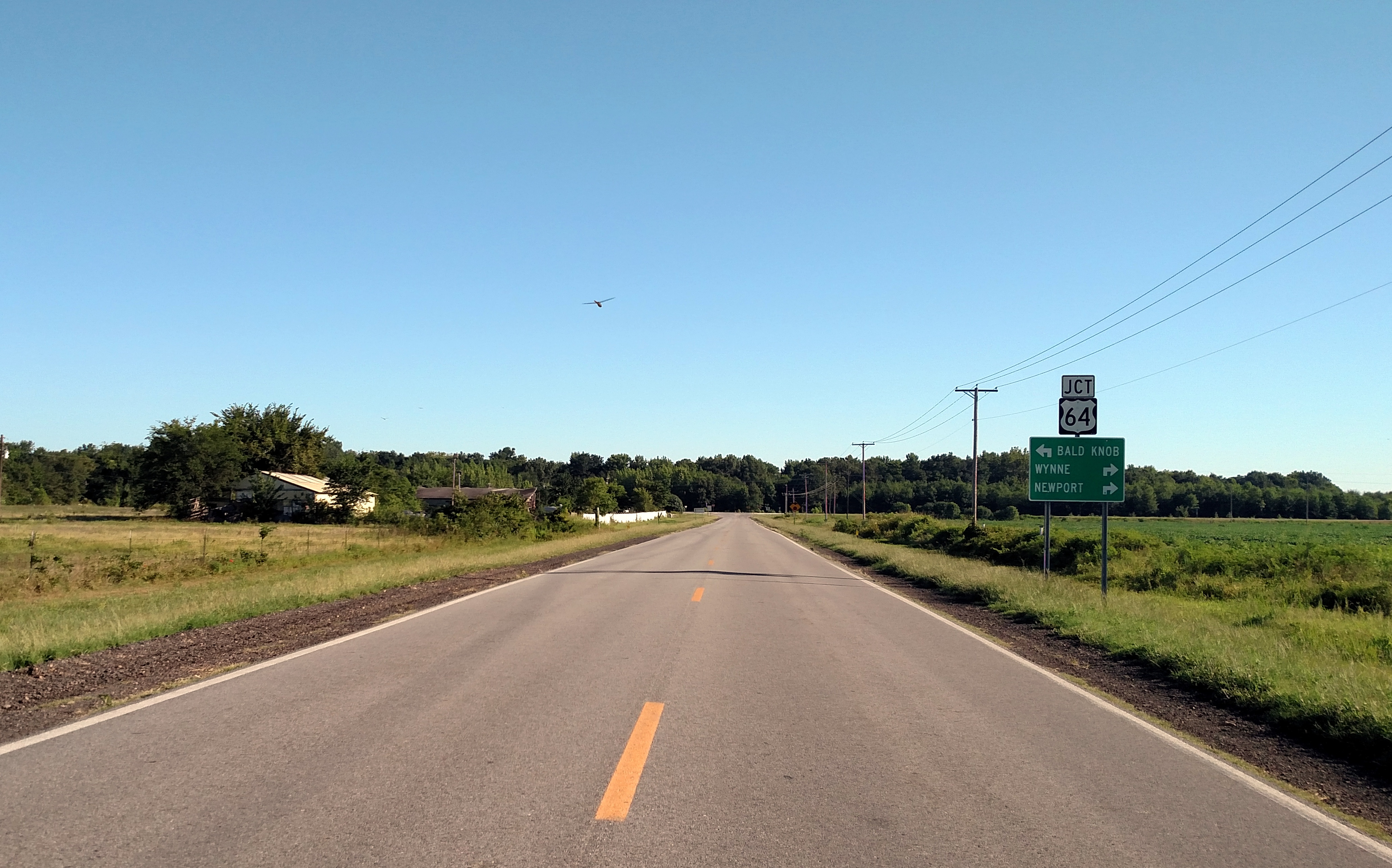
Top: The Cache River runs through a hardwood forest in Woodruff County
Bottom: Typical countryside in Woodruff County. This photo taken along Highway 64B north of Patterson.

The county is located in the Arkansas Delta, one of the six primary geographic regions of Arkansas. The Arkansas Delta is a subregion of the Mississippi Alluvial Plain, which is a flat area consisting of rich, fertile sediment deposits from the Mississippi River between Louisiana and Illinois. According to the U.S. Census Bureau, the county has a total area of 594 square miles (1,540 km^{2}), of which 587 square miles (1,520 km^{2}) is land and 7.2 square miles (19 km^{2}) (1.2%) is water. Major hydrologic features include the Cache River, which roughly bisects the county north–south, Bayou De View, which runs through eastern Woodruff County, and the White River, which serves as the county's western boundary.

Prior to settlement, Woodruff County was densely forested, with bayous, sloughs, and swamps crossing the land. Seeking to take advantage of the area's fertile soils, settlers cleared the land to better suit row crops. Although some swampland has been preserved in the Cache River NWR and some former farmland has undergone reforestation, the majority (56 percent) of the county remains in cultivation. (Note: In 2014, 114 thousand acres of soybeans, 58.7 thousand acres of rice, 14.6 thousand acres of wheat, 17 thousand acres of corn and 7 thousand acres of sorghum were planted in Woodruff County. Total acreage for these major field crops is 211,600. Woodruff County is 594 square miles, which is 380,160 acres based on 640 acres per square mile. Acreage for the total crops (211,600) divided by acreage for the county (380,160) is 55.7 percent.) Another large land use in Woodruff County is the Cache River NWR, owned by the United States Fish and Wildlife Service. Stretching approximately 90 miles (140 km) across adjacent counties, the NWR is listed as a Ramsar wetlands of international importance, and serves as a key wintering area for ducks and the largest contiguous tract of bottomland hardwood forest in North America. The NWR aggressively seeks willing property owners to sell land to add to the NWR's boundaries, adding 2,000 acres (810 ha) in 2015.

The county is located approximately 75 miles (121 km) northeast of Little Rock and 81.3 miles (130.8 km) west of Memphis, Tennessee. (Note: Mileages from Woodruff County to Little Rock and Memphis are based on highway miles using county seat Augusta for Woodruff County.) Woodruff County is surrounded by five other Delta counties: Jackson County to the north, Cross County to the northeast, St. Francis County to the southeast, Monroe County to the south and Prairie County to the southwest. West of Woodruff County is White County, which is something of combination point for the Delta, Ozarks, and Central Arkansas.

=== Climate ===
Woodruff County has a humid subtropical climate (Köppen Cfa). Woodruff County experiences all four seasons, although summers can be extremely hot and humid and winters are mild with little snow. July is the hottest month of the year, with an average high of 93 °F (33.9 °C) and an average low of 70 °F (21.1 °C). Temperatures above 100 °F (38 °C) are not uncommon. January is the coldest month with an average high of 49 °F (9.4 °C) and an average low of 27 °F (−2.8 °C). The highest temperature was 112 °F (44.4 °C), recorded in 1936 and 1972. The lowest temperature recorded was −11 °F (−24 °C), on January 8, 1942.

Climate data for Augusta Climate Data
| Month | Jan | Feb | Mar | Apr | May | Jun | Jul | Aug | Sep | Oct | Nov | Dec | Year |
|---|---|---|---|---|---|---|---|---|---|---|---|---|---|
| Record high °F (°C) | 87 (31) | 85 (29) | 90 (32) | 97 (36) | 99 (37) | 109 (43) | 112 (44) | 112 (44) | 109 (43) | 98 (37) | 87 (31) | 81 (27) | 112 (44) |
| Mean daily maximum °F (°C) | 49 (9) | 54 (12) | 63 (17) | 73 (23) | 81 (27) | 89 (32) | 93 (34) | 92 (33) | 85 (29) | 74 (23) | 62 (17) | 51 (11) | 72 (22) |
| Mean daily minimum °F (°C) | 27 (−3) | 31 (−1) | 39 (4) | 48 (9) | 58 (14) | 67 (19) | 70 (21) | 69 (21) | 60 (16) | 48 (9) | 39 (4) | 30 (−1) | 49 (9) |
| Record low °F (°C) | −11 (−24) | −10 (−23) | 9 (−13) | 24 (−4) | 36 (2) | 44 (7) | 52 (11) | 48 (9) | 34 (1) | 24 (−4) | 11 (−12) | −4 (−20) | −11 (−24) |
| Average precipitation inches (mm) | 3.6 (91) | 3.8 (97) | 4.8 (120) | 5.0 (130) | 5.5 (140) | 2.9 (74) | 3.7 (94) | 2.7 (69) | 3.4 (86) | 4.7 (120) | 5.2 (130) | 5.0 (130) | 50.3 (1,281) |
| Average snowfall inches (cm) | 0.8 (2.0) | 1.0 (2.5) | 0.1 (0.25) | 0 (0) | 0 (0) | 0 (0) | 0 (0) | 0 (0) | 0 (0) | 0 (0) | 0 (0) | 0.1 (0.25) | 2.0 (5.1) |
Source 1: The Weather Channel
Source 2: Weather Database

=== Communities ===
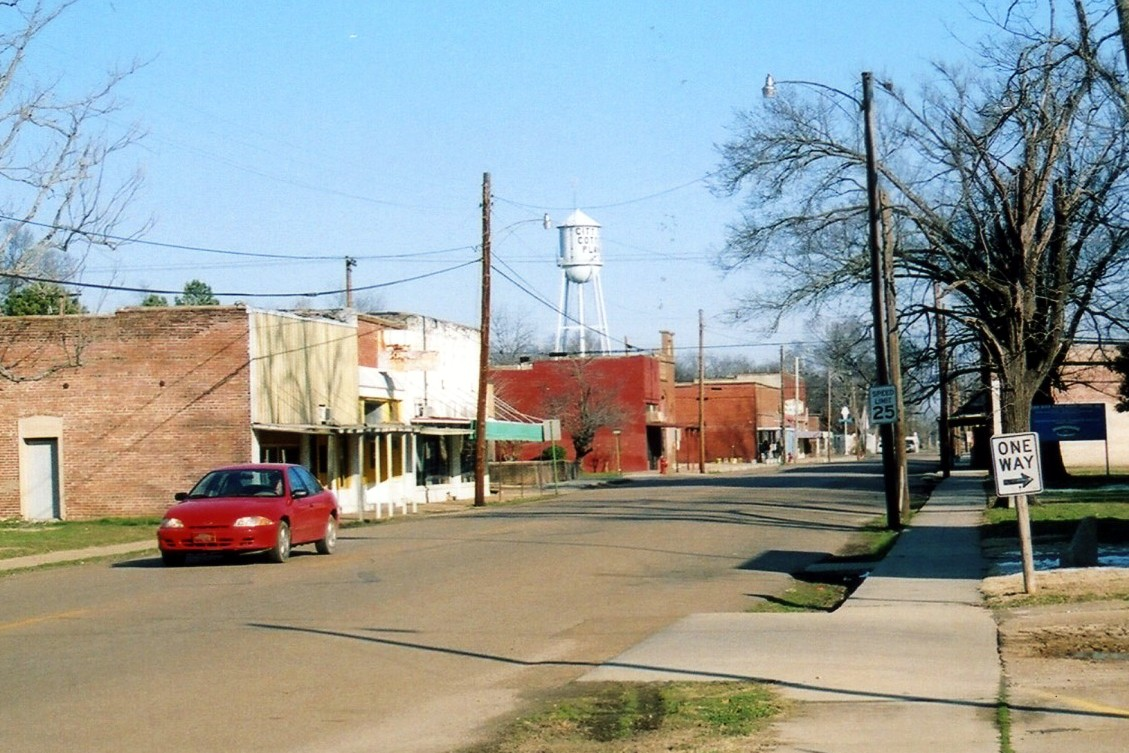
Streetside in Cotton Plant

Four incorporated cities and one incorporated town are located within the county. The largest city and county seat, Augusta, is located in the western part of the county near the White River and the White County border. Augusta's population was 1,998 as of the 2020 Census, well below its peak of 3,496 at the 1980 Census. McCrory and Patterson are adjacent to each other, located near the county's center. Cotton Plant and Hunter are both located in the southern part of Woodruff County, with 2020 populations of 529 and 103, respectively.

Woodruff County has dozens of unincorporated communities and ghost towns within its borders. This is due to early settlers in Arkansas tending to cluster in small clusters rather than incorporated towns. For example, Fitzhugh had a post office at some point in its history. Other communities are simply a few dwellings at a crossroads that have adopted a common place name over time. Some are officially listed as populated places by the United States Geological Survey, and others are listed as historic settlements. Gregory is listed as a census-designated place.

==== Unincorporated communities ====
- Becton
- Dixie
- Fitzhugh
- Grays
- Gregory
- Hillemann
- Howell
- Little Dixie‡
- McClelland
- Morton
- New Augusta
- New Salem
- Pleasant Grove
- Pumpkin Bend
- Shady Grove

==== Historic communities ====
- Barson
- Bemis
- Bulltown
- Casey
- Cavell
- Colona
- Cow Mound
- Daggett
- DeView
- Flynn
- Four Forks
- Goodrich
- Kramer
- Maberry
- McGregor
- Morelock
- Negro Head Corner
- Overcup
- Penrose
- Quinlan
- Revel
- Riverside
- Simmons
- Sturdevant
- Taylorville
- Tip
- Union
- Wiville

=== Townships ===
Townships in Arkansas are the divisions of a county. Each township includes unincorporated areas; some may have incorporated cities or towns within part of their boundaries. Arkansas townships have limited purposes in modern times. However, the United States census does list Arkansas population based on townships (sometimes referred to as "county subdivisions" or "minor civil divisions"). Townships are also of value for historical purposes in terms of genealogical research. Each town or city is within one or more townships in an Arkansas county based on census maps and publications. The townships of Woodruff County are listed below; listed in parentheses are the cities, towns, and/or census-designated places that are fully or partially inside the township.

- Augusta (Augusta)
- Barnes
- Cache
- Caney (Hunter)
- Cotton Plant (Cotton Plant)
- Dent
- De View (McCrory, Patterson)
- Franks
- Freeman
- Garden
- Point
- Pumpkin Bend
- White River

== Demographics ==
Historical population
| Census | Pop. | Note | %± |
|---|---|---|---|
| 1870 | 6,891 | | — |
| 1880 | 8,646 | | 25.5% |
| 1890 | 14,009 | | 62.0% |
| 1900 | 16,304 | | 16.4% |
| 1910 | 20,049 | | 23.0% |
| 1920 | 21,547 | | 7.5% |
| 1930 | 22,682 | | 5.3% |
| 1940 | 22,133 | | −2.4% |
| 1950 | 18,957 | | −14.3% |
| 1960 | 13,954 | | −26.4% |
| 1970 | 11,566 | | −17.1% |
| 1980 | 11,222 | | −3.0% |
| 1990 | 9,520 | | −15.2% |
| 2000 | 8,741 | | −8.2% |
| 2010 | 7,260 | | −16.9% |
| 2020 | 6,269 | | −13.7% |
| 2025 (est.) | 5,710 | ▼ | −8.9% |
U.S. Decennial Census; 1790–1960 1900–1990; 1990–2000 2010

=== 2020 census ===
Woodruff County Racial Composition
| Race | Num. | Perc. |
|---|---|---|
| White | 4,235 | 67.55% |
| Black or African American | 1,601 | 25.54% |
| Native American | 8 | 0.13% |
| Asian | 22 | 0.35% |
| Other/Mixed | 307 | 4.9% |
| Hispanic or Latino | 96 | 1.53% |

As of the 2020 census, the county had a population of 6,269. The median age was 46.2 years. 21.0% of residents were under the age of 18 and 24.2% of residents were 65 years of age or older. For every 100 females there were 94.7 males, and for every 100 females age 18 and over there were 92.1 males age 18 and over.

The racial makeup of the county was 67.9% White, 25.7% Black or African American, 0.1% American Indian and Alaska Native, 0.4% Asian, <0.1% Native Hawaiian and Pacific Islander, 0.8% from some other race, and 5.1% from two or more races. Hispanic or Latino residents of any race comprised 1.5% of the population.

<0.1% of residents lived in urban areas, while 100.0% lived in rural areas.

There were 2,775 households in the county, of which 26.1% had children under the age of 18 living in them. Of all households, 39.2% were married-couple households, 22.5% were households with a male householder and no spouse or partner present, and 32.7% were households with a female householder and no spouse or partner present. About 36.1% of all households were made up of individuals and 17.9% had someone living alone who was 65 years of age or older.

There were 3,250 housing units, of which 14.6% were vacant. Among occupied housing units, 62.4% were owner-occupied and 37.6% were renter-occupied. The homeowner vacancy rate was 1.6% and the rental vacancy rate was 8.6%.

=== 2000 census ===
As of the 2000 United States census, there were 8,741 people, 3,531 households, and 2,439 families residing in the county. The population density was 15 people per square mile (5.8 people/km^{2}). There were 4,089 housing units at an average density of 7 units per square mile (2.7 units/km^{2}). The racial makeup of the county was 67.86% White, 30.75% Black or African American, 0.23% Native American, 0.07% Asian, 0.10% Pacific Islander, 0.17% from other races, and 0.81% from two or more races. 0.79% of the population were Hispanic or Latino of any race.

There were 3,531 households, out of which 30.90% had children under the age of 18 living with them, 48.60% were married couples living together, 16.70% had a female householder with no husband present, and 30.90% were non-families. 28.20% of all households were made up of individuals, and 14.20% had someone living alone who was 65 years of age or older. The average household size was 2.44 and the average family size was 2.97.

In the county, the population was spread out, with 26.00% under the age of 18, 8.40% from 18 to 24, 24.50% from 25 to 44, 24.40% from 45 to 64, and 16.70% who were 65 years of age or older. The median age was 38 years. For every 100 females there were 89.20 males. For every 100 females age 18 and over, there were 84.90 males.

The median income for a household in the county was $22,099, and the median income for a family was $27,824. Males had a median income of $24,051 versus $17,995 for females. The per capita income for the county was $13,269. About 21.70% of families and 27.00% of the population were below the poverty line, including 38.10% of those under age 18 and 27.00% of those age 65 or over.

== Economy ==
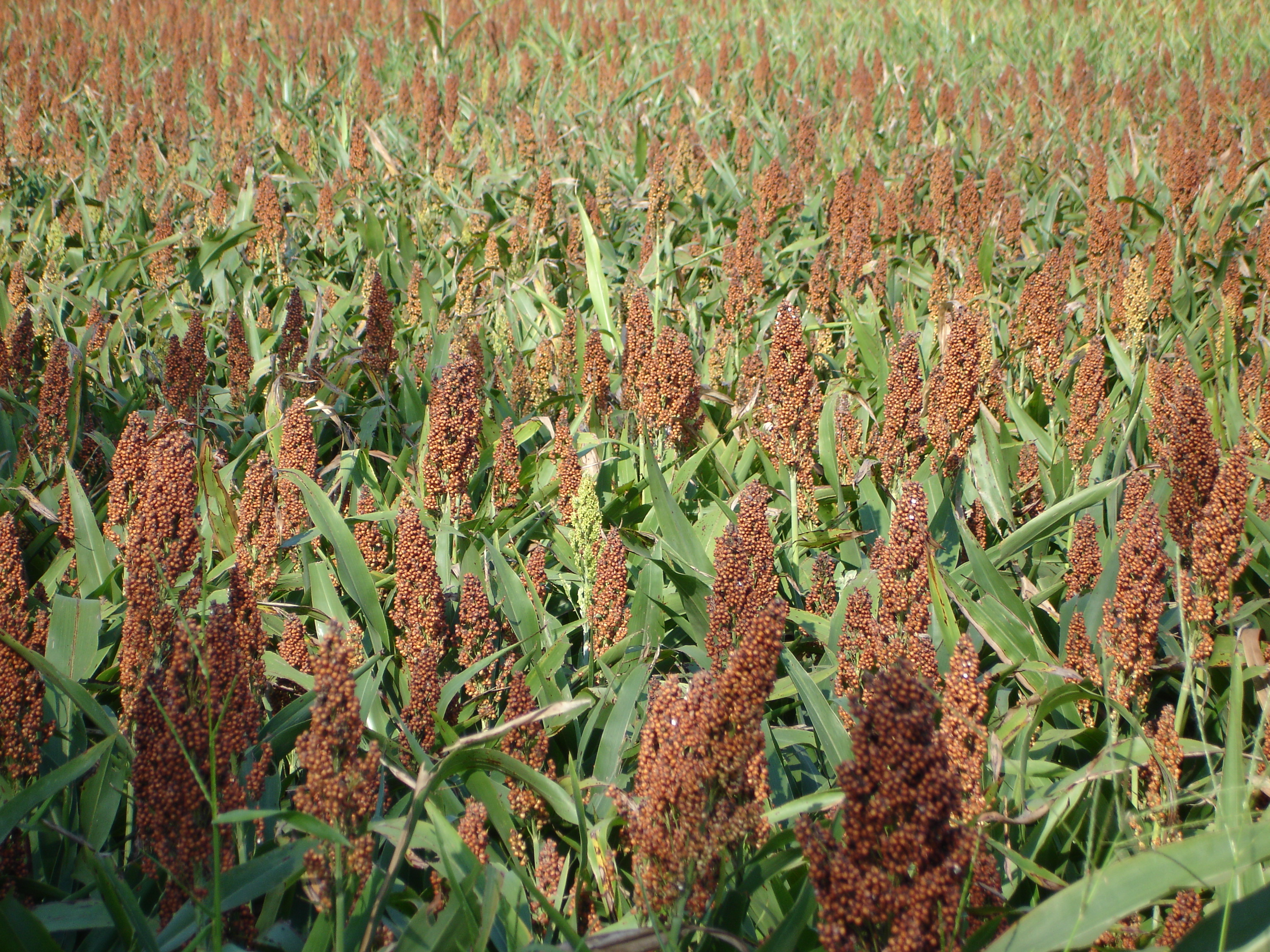
Sorghum grows near the Cache River in Woodruff County

-->

== Government ==
The county government is a constitutional body granted specific powers by the Constitution of Arkansas and the Arkansas Code. The quorum court is the legislative branch of the county government and controls all spending and revenue collection. Representatives are called justices of the peace and are elected from county districts every even-numbered year. The number of districts in a county vary from nine to fifteen, and district boundaries are drawn by the county election commission. The Woodruff County Quorum Court has nine members. Presiding over quorum court meetings is the county judge, who serves as the chief executive officer of the county. The county judge is elected at-large and does not vote in quorum court business, although capable of vetoing quorum court decisions.

Woodruff County, like most rural white Southern counties, leaned heavily Democratic for most of its history, particularly in the Jim Crow and immediate post-Jim Crow eras. From 1880 to 2012, the county failed to back the Democratic nominee in a presidential election only twice: in 1968, when it backed the third-party candidacy of George Wallace (who was otherwise affiliated with the Democratic Party) and in 1972, when it and every other county in the state backed Republican Richard Nixon amidst a national landslide. In 2016 and 2020, it voted for Republican Donald Trump amidst large Republican gains in rural areas across the nation. The 2020 election marked a historic shift, as the county swung substantially to the right despite Trump losing the national election. This marked the first time in history that a Democrat was elected president without carrying Woodruff County, and Trump's 28-point win was the largest Republican margin in the county's history.

Despite Woodruff County's Republican trend at the state and federal levels, many Democratic and Independent politicians still hold numerous local offices. As of 2025, the Quorum Court is evenly split between Democrats and Republicans, meanwhile the majority of countywide officials are independents.

Woodruff County is represented in the 10th district of the Arkansas Senate by Republican Ron Caldwell, a real estate businessman from Wynne in Cross County, and in the 61st district of the Arkansas House of Representatives by Republican Jeremiah Moore, a real estate broker from Clarendon in Monroe County. The county is part of the 1st congressional district in the U.S. House of Representatives, and is represented by Republican Rick Crawford.

Woodruff County, Arkansas Elected countywide officials
| Position | Officeholder | Party |
|---|---|---|
| County Judge | Michael John Gray | Independent |
| County Clerk | Jackie Meredith | Independent |
| Circuit Clerk | Lori Grisham | Independent |
| Sheriff/Collector | Phil Reynolds | Independent |
| Treasurer | Carrie Woodall | Independent |
| Tax Assessor | Leslie Collins | Independent |
| Coroner | Brad Bevills | (Unknown) |

The composition of the Quorum Court after the 2024 elections is 4 Democrats, 4 Republicans, and 1 Independent. Justices of the Peace (members) of the Quorum Court following the elections are:

- District 1: Thomas Gaines (R)
- District 2: Brian Austin (R)
- District 3: Kenny Simons (R)
- District 4: Freddie Hudson (D)
- District 5: Charlie Dallas (R)
- District 6: Bill Crawford (D)
- District 7: John Berry Beard III (I)
- District 8: Harold "Bo" Collins (D)
- District 9: Robert Gibbs (D)

Additionally, the townships of Woodruff County are entitled to elect their own respective constables, as set forth by the Constitution of Arkansas. Constables are largely of historical significance as they were used to keep the peace in rural areas when travel was more difficult. The township constables as of the 2024 elections are:

- Augusta Township: Joe Atkins (D)
- Cotton Plant Township: Allen Holmes (R)
- McCrory Township: Johnnie Jay Hodge (R)

United States presidential election results for Woodruff County, Arkansas
| Year | Republican | | Democratic | | Third party(ies) | |
| Year | No. | % | No. | % | No. | % |
|---|---|---|---|---|---|---|
| 1896 | 620 | 29.43% | 1,478 | 70.15% | 9 | 0.43% |
| 1900 | 549 | 35.51% | 990 | 64.04% | 7 | 0.45% |
| 1904 | 578 | 38.84% | 861 | 57.86% | 49 | 3.29% |
| 1908 | 752 | 40.39% | 1,046 | 56.18% | 64 | 3.44% |
| 1912 | 473 | 27.84% | 903 | 53.15% | 323 | 19.01% |
| 1916 | 438 | 31.90% | 935 | 68.10% | 0 | 0.00% |
| 1920 | 943 | 46.41% | 1,049 | 51.62% | 40 | 1.97% |
| 1924 | 254 | 24.26% | 762 | 72.78% | 31 | 2.96% |
| 1928 | 452 | 27.95% | 1,163 | 71.92% | 2 | 0.12% |
| 1932 | 135 | 6.68% | 1,864 | 92.19% | 23 | 1.14% |
| 1936 | 253 | 14.55% | 1,473 | 84.70% | 13 | 0.75% |
| 1940 | 193 | 13.03% | 1,280 | 86.43% | 8 | 0.54% |
| 1944 | 279 | 16.79% | 1,377 | 82.85% | 6 | 0.36% |
| 1948 | 207 | 11.32% | 1,008 | 55.11% | 614 | 33.57% |
| 1952 | 818 | 28.81% | 2,017 | 71.05% | 4 | 0.14% |
| 1956 | 992 | 37.08% | 1,630 | 60.93% | 53 | 1.98% |
| 1960 | 667 | 26.31% | 1,613 | 63.63% | 255 | 10.06% |
| 1964 | 1,366 | 36.99% | 2,307 | 62.47% | 20 | 0.54% |
| 1968 | 625 | 17.22% | 1,270 | 35.00% | 1,734 | 47.78% |
| 1972 | 1,989 | 61.73% | 1,183 | 36.72% | 50 | 1.55% |
| 1976 | 848 | 21.78% | 3,040 | 78.09% | 5 | 0.13% |
| 1980 | 1,204 | 32.06% | 2,452 | 65.28% | 100 | 2.66% |
| 1984 | 1,675 | 44.56% | 2,055 | 54.67% | 29 | 0.77% |
| 1988 | 1,097 | 36.16% | 1,924 | 63.41% | 13 | 0.43% |
| 1992 | 676 | 19.34% | 2,589 | 74.08% | 230 | 6.58% |
| 1996 | 598 | 20.97% | 2,044 | 71.67% | 210 | 7.36% |
| 2000 | 898 | 33.87% | 1,699 | 64.09% | 54 | 2.04% |
| 2004 | 1,021 | 33.74% | 1,972 | 65.17% | 33 | 1.09% |
| 2008 | 1,206 | 43.68% | 1,412 | 51.14% | 143 | 5.18% |
| 2012 | 1,227 | 45.70% | 1,340 | 49.91% | 118 | 4.39% |
| 2016 | 1,347 | 52.39% | 1,118 | 43.49% | 106 | 4.12% |
| 2020 | 1,543 | 62.32% | 856 | 34.57% | 77 | 3.11% |
| 2024 | 1,513 | 65.27% | 760 | 32.79% | 45 | 1.94% |

== Infrastructure ==
=== Aviation ===
The Woodruff County Airport located along US 64 between Patterson and Augusta is the only public own/public use airport in the county. It is a general aviation airport, serving primarily agricultural (spraying) and recreational operations. For the twelve-month period ending June 30, 2014, the facility saw 5,500 general aviation operations.

=== Major highways ===
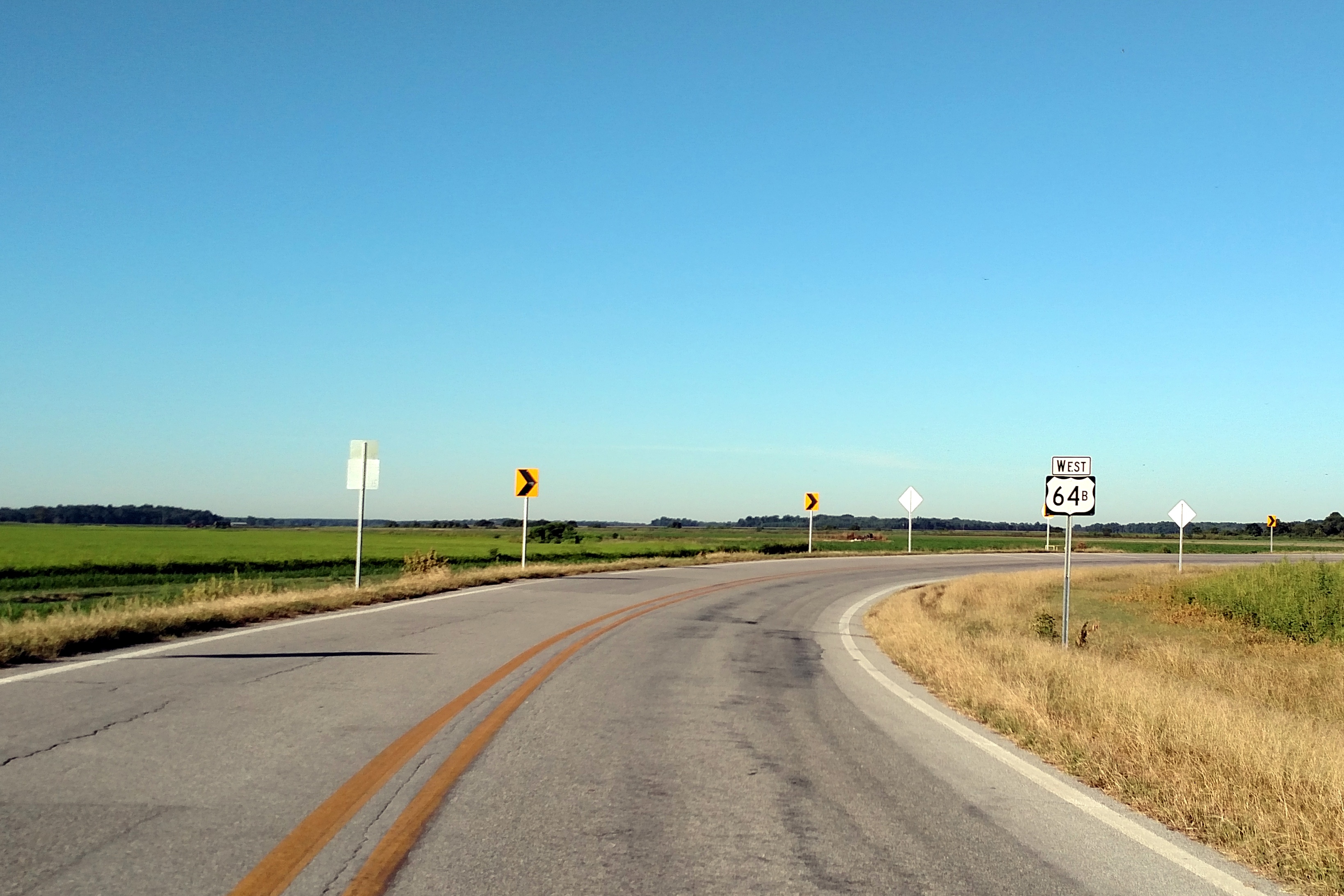
Highway 64B east of Augusta

- US 49 / US 63
- US 64
- AR 17
- AR 33
- AR 37
- AR 38
- AR 78
- AR 145
- AR 260
- AR 262
- AR 269
- AR 284
- AR 306
- AR 339

=== Utilities ===
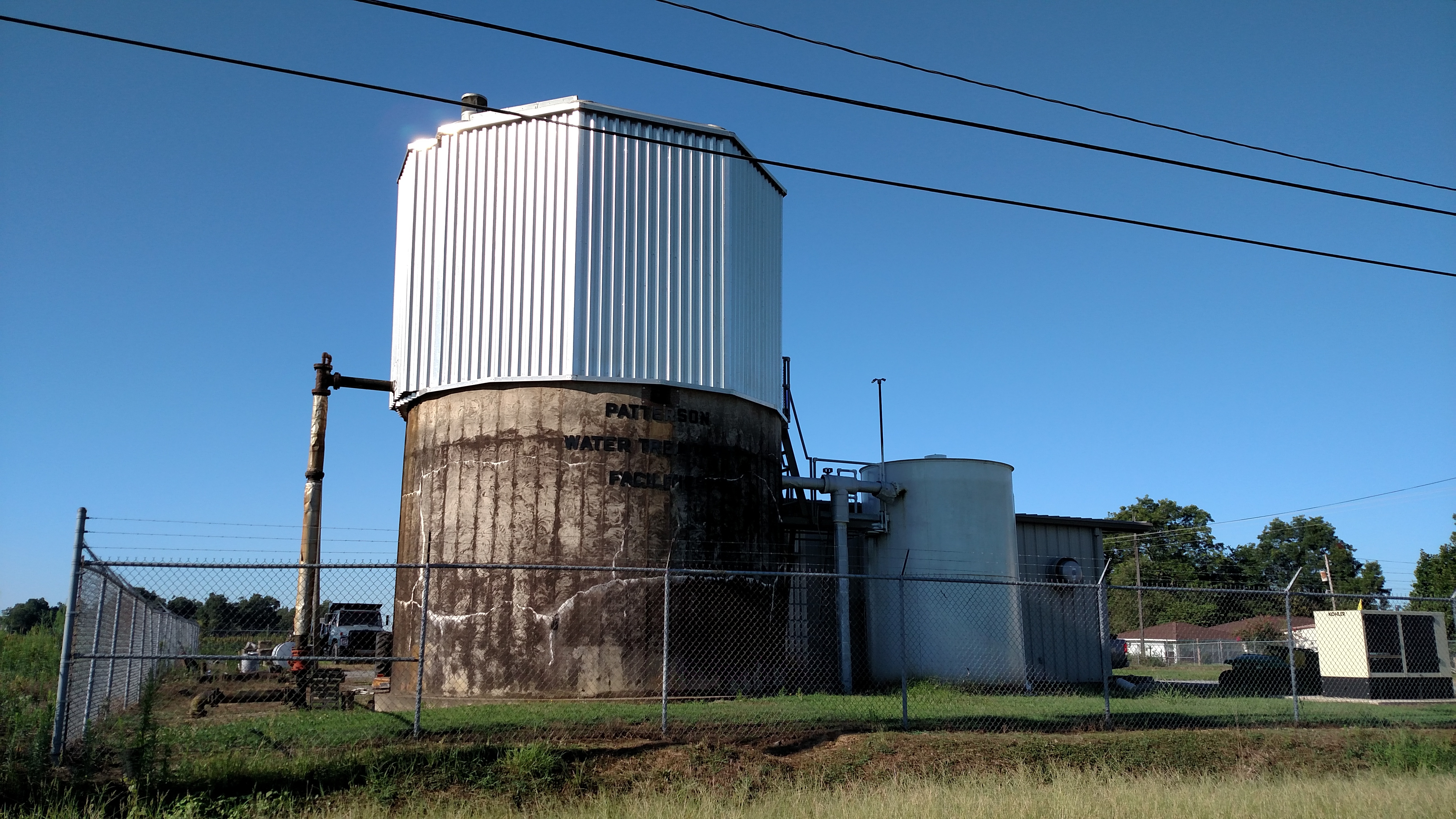
The Patterson Water Treatment Facility produces potable water distributed by Patterson Waterworks and the West Woodruff Water District.

The Arkansas Department of Health is responsible for the regulation and oversight of public water systems throughout the state. Woodruff County contains seven community water systems: Augusta Waterworks, Breckenridge Union Water Association (UWA), Cross County Rural Water System, Cotton Plant Waterworks, McCrory Waterworks, Patterson Waterworks, and West Woodruff Water District. Within the county, Augusta Waterworks has the largest retail population (2,284), followed by McCrory (1,647), and Breckenridge UWA (1,267). All community water systems in Woodruff County use groundwater as their source of raw water, except West Woodruff Water District, who purchases all water from Patterson.

== Education ==
- Augusta School District, with two schools serving more than 300 students; includes Augusta High School. In 2004, the Cotton Plant School District consolidated into Augusta and the Cotton Plant campus was later closed in 2014.
- McCrory School District, with two schools serving more than 500 students; includes McCrory High School.

The southeastern portion of Woodruff County, including Hunter, is served by the Brinkley School District in neighboring Monroe County.

== See also ==
- List of lakes in Woodruff County, Arkansas
- National Register of Historic Places listings in Woodruff County, Arkansas
