= Gazzola and Vaccaro Building =

- U.S. National Register of Historic Places
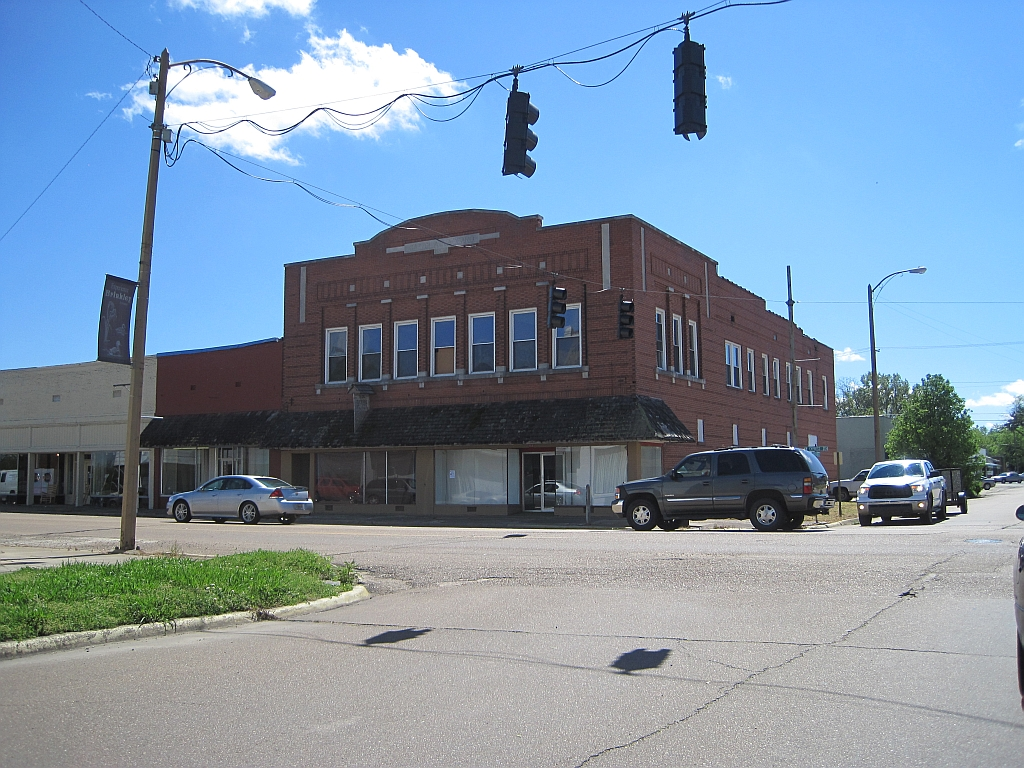
- Gazzola and Vaccaro Building, March 2012

- Location within Arkansas Location within the United States
- Location: 131-133 W. Cypress, Brinkley, Arkansas
- Coordinates: 34°53′14″N 91°11′34″W
- Area: less than one acre
- Built: 1916
- Architect: Charles L. Thompson
- Architectural style: Prairie School
- MPS: Thompson, Charles L., Design Collection TR
- NRHP reference No.: 82000865
- Added to NRHP: December 22, 1982

The Gazzola and Vaccaro Building is a historic commercial building at 131–133 West Cypress in Brinkley, Arkansas. It is a two-story brick structure, with a flat roof fronted by a broad curved parapet. The horizontal banding of windows and decorative elements above are indicators of the Prairie School of design. The building was designed by architect Charles L. Thompson and completed in 1916; it is an imposing presence and the small city's most sophisticated architectural building.

The building was listed on the National Register of Historic Places in 1982.

== See also ==
- National Register of Historic Places listings in Monroe County, Arkansas
