= List of lakes of Woodruff County, Arkansas =

There are at least 69 named lakes and reservoirs in Woodruff County, Arkansas.

== Lakes ==
- Beard Lake, 35°09′46″N 091°16′26″W, el. 180 feet (55 m)
- Beaver Lake, 35°10′28″N 091°16′25″W, el. 184 feet (56 m)
- Big Blue Hole, 35°12′03″N 091°22′27″W, el. 190 feet (58 m)
- Big Buck Lake, 34°56′16″N 091°21′08″W, el. 171 feet (52 m)
- Big Elam Lake, 35°08′04″N 091°09′20″W, el. 194 feet (59 m)
- Big Jack Lake, 35°10′02″N 091°07′23″W, el. 194 feet (59 m)
- Big Jordan Lake, 35°21′25″N 091°23′54″W, el. 194 feet (59 m)
- Big York Lake, 35°06′58″N 091°10′15″W, el. 194 feet (59 m)
- Bird Lake, 35°10′40″N 091°16′28″W, el. 184 feet (56 m)
- Blue Lake, 35°25′46″N 091°16′31″W, el. 207 feet (63 m)
- Blue Lake, 35°00′45″N 091°12′14″W, el. 180 feet (55 m)
- Broom Lake, 35°09′52″N 091°07′49″W, el. 194 feet (59 m)
- Brushy Lake, 35°14′42″N 091°22′34″W, el. 187 feet (57 m)
- Brushy Lake, 35°14′35″N 091°06′52″W, el. 203 feet (62 m)
- Brushy Lake, 35°05′41″N 091°10′33″W, el. 190 feet (58 m)
- Brushy Lake, 35°12′38″N 091°15′20″W, el. 184 feet (56 m)
- Buckley Lake, 35°19′04″N 091°25′33″W, el. 187 feet (57 m)
- Buzzard Lake, 35°01′14″N 091°12′16″W, el. 184 feet (56 m)
- Chambers Lake, 35°12′14″N 091°06′32″W, el. 197 feet (60 m)
- Cheatam Lake, 35°11′21″N 091°06′58″W, el. 194 feet (59 m)
- Clear Lake, 35°11′30″N 091°24′19″W, el. 184 feet (56 m)
- Crane Lake, 35°09′03″N 091°24′01″W, el. 184 feet (56 m)
- Dupree Lake, 35°10′48″N 091°16′45″W, el. 184 feet (56 m)
- Eagle Lake, 35°19′02″N 091°24′11″W, el. 194 feet (59 m)
- Fish Lake, 35°09′50″N 091°24′06″W, el. 184 feet (56 m)
- Goose Pond, 35°18′43″N 091°23′02″W, el. 187 feet (57 m)
- Gregory Lake, 35°11′41″N 091°22′12″W, el. 194 feet (59 m)
- Hammond Lake, 34°59′25″N 091°19′40″W, el. 174 feet (53 m)
- Horseshoe Lake, 35°14′25″N 091°21′09″W, el. 190 feet (58 m)
- Hurricane Lake, 35°17′22″N 091°08′55″W, el. 207 feet (63 m)
- Hurricane Lake, 35°07′36″N 091°09′44″W, el. 194 feet (59 m)
- Jackson Lake, 35°11′58″N 091°21′54″W, el. 190 feet (58 m)
- Jennings Lake, 35°18′27″N 091°24′13″W, el. 194 feet (59 m)
- Johnson Lake, 35°08′59″N 091°22′14″W, el. 184 feet (56 m)
- Johnson Lake, 35°05′05″N 091°10′50″W, el. 187 feet (57 m)
- King Lake, 35°16′43″N 091°07′32″W, el. 207 feet (63 m)
- Little Blue Hole, 35°12′20″N 091°21′44″W, el. 190 feet (58 m)
- Little Buck Lake, 34°56′32″N 091°21′04″W, el. 171 feet (52 m)
- Little Clear Lake, 35°01′53″N 091°20′28″W, el. 180 feet (55 m)
- Little Elam Lake, 35°08′19″N 091°09′20″W, el. 194 feet (59 m)
- Little Jack Lake, 35°10′10″N 091°07′14″W, el. 194 feet (59 m)
- Little Jordan Lake, 35°21′22″N 091°22′56″W, el. 194 feet (59 m)
- Little Reddon Lake, 35°09′17″N 091°08′15″W, el. 194 feet (59 m)
- Little York Lake, 35°07′04″N 091°10′08″W, el. 194 feet (59 m)
- Log Lake, 35°08′07″N 091°23′25″W, el. 184 feet (56 m)
- Long Lake, 34°54′47″N 091°20′22″W, el. 171 feet (52 m)
- Lost Lake, 35°07′42″N 091°23′11″W, el. 184 feet (56 m)
- Lost Lake, 35°09′05″N 091°08′27″W, el. 194 feet (59 m)
- Lower Seibert Lake, 35°04′07″N 091°11′08″W, el. 187 feet (57 m)
- Mill Lake, 35°23′24″N 091°19′46″W, el. 200 feet (61 m)
- Morrison Lake, 35°03′34″N 091°12′21″W, el. 184 feet (56 m)
- Mud Lake, 35°10′00″N 091°25′33″W, el. 184 feet (56 m)
- Polly Ann Lake, 35°03′43″N 091°11′49″W, el. 187 feet (57 m)
- Reddon Lake, 35°09′25″N 091°08′14″W, el. 194 feet (59 m)
- Robinson Lake, 35°09′07″N 091°21′50″W, el. 184 feet (56 m)
- Sevenmile Lake, 35°08′41″N 091°24′11″W, el. 184 feet (56 m)
- Spivey Lake, 35°02′41″N 091°12′45″W, el. 184 feet (56 m)
- Straight Lake, 35°22′07″N 091°24′13″W, el. 200 feet (61 m)
- Straight Lake, 35°19′55″N 091°06′39″W, el. 217 feet (66 m)
- Straight Lake, 35°13′37″N 091°20′56″W, el. 190 feet (58 m)
- Sullivan Lake, 35°13′45″N 091°06′47″W, el. 203 feet (62 m)
- Teague Lake, 35°23′46″N 091°21′45″W, el. 197 feet (60 m)
- Three Prong Lake, 35°14′11″N 091°21′46″W, el. 194 feet (59 m)
- Turtle Lake, 35°12′02″N 091°24′01″W, el. 187 feet (57 m)
- Upper Seibert Lake, 35°04′22″N 091°11′10″W, el. 187 feet (57 m)
- Walker Lake, 35°10′07″N 091°16′25″W, el. 184 feet (56 m)
- White Lake, 35°24′58″N 091°18′40″W, el. 197 feet (60 m)
- White Lake, 35°17′59″N 091°08′58″W, el. 207 feet (63 m)
- Yancopin Lake, 35°23′21″N 091°22′22″W, el. 200 feet (61 m)

== Reservoirs ==
According to the United States Geological Survey, there are no named reservoirs in Newton County, Arkansas.

== See also ==
- List of lakes in Arkansas
