= Dorathy M. Allen =

American politician

Dorathy Allen (née McDonald) (March 10, 1910 – May 12, 1990) was an American newspaper editor and publisher, and Democratic Party politician. Allen is most remembered as the first woman to be elected to the Arkansas State Senate. Allen represented District 26 which included Monroe, Lee, Arkansas, and Phillips counties. Her first election to the Senate was a special election in 1964 to replace the open seat left by the death of her husband, State Senator Tom Allen. She ran unopposed in 1966 and 1970. During her time in office, she was the only female in the Arkansas State Senate.

== Family and early life ==
Dorathy McDonald, daughter of Jack and Dora (Barnes) McDonald, was born in Helena in Phillips County, Arkansas on March 10, 1910.

Dorathy married Tom Allen in May 1941 and the couple moved to Brinkley in Monroe County, Arkansas. The Allens had no children. Tom died from cancer on October 31, 1963.

== Newspaper career ==
Dorathy began a career in the media as the society editor of the Helena World. She later worked for the Eastern Arkansas Record in the news and advertising departments. After her marriage to the Allens published the Citizen in Brinkley, the Monroe County Sun in Clarendon, Arkansas, and the Woodruff County Democrat in Cotton Plant, Arkansas.

In 1974, a fire destroyed the second floor of the Citizen.

== Public service ==
Before her election to the State Senate, Dorathy was involved in numerous community groups and had a leadership role in several prominent organizations. She was on the Governor's Advisory Committee on Mental Retardation, and was the past president of the Arkansas Hospital Association. She was a charter member and the first president of the Brinkley Business and Professional Women's Club, and was a past president of Arkansas Press Women. After Dorathy left the Senate, she remained active in community clubs throughout the rest of her life.

== Miss Arkansas Pageant ==
Prior to 1945, the Miss Arkansas Pageant was sponsored by the East Arkansas Young Businessmen's Club. In 1944, Dorathy chaperoned the Miss Arkansas Pageant winner to the Miss America Pageant in Atlantic City where she saw the defects in Arkansas pageant that would keep their local contestant from successfully competing at the national level. On her return to Arkansas, Dorathy took charge of the Miss Arkansas pageant.

== Political career ==
In 1944, Tom Allen was elected to the Arkansas House of Representatives. He was subsequently elected to the Arkansas State Senate, holding the seat until his death. On July 28, 1964, Dorathy Allen ran for and was elected to fill the open Arkansas Senate seat he held before his death. She was reelected in 1966 and 1970 without opposition. Dorathy served in the state senate until January 1975. She did not run for reelection after reapportionment altered the senate district's boundaries. Dorathy was employed as a Senate clerk from 1975 to 1976.

== Death ==
Allen died on May 12, 1990.

== See also ==
- Lurleen Wallace
