= Brinkley (surname) =

Brinkley is a surname. Notable people with the surname include:

- Alan Brinkley (1949–2019), historian
- Amy Woods Brinkley (born c. 1956), businesswoman
- Beau Brinkley (born 1990), American football player
- Casper Brinkley (born 1985), American football player
- Christie Brinkley (born 1954), model
- Curtis Brinkley (born 1985), American football player
- Darryl Brinkley (born 1968), American baseball player and coach
- David Brinkley (1920–2003), television journalist
- David R. Brinkley (born 1959), Maryland politician
- Don Brinkley, (1921–2012) television writer and producer, adoptive father of Christie
- Douglas Brinkley (born 1960), American author and historian
- Francis Brinkley (1841–1912), Anglo-Irish newspaper author and scholar
- Lester Brinkley (1965–2002), American football player
- Jack Thomas Brinkley (1930–2019), American politician
- Jamel Brinkley, American writer
- James Brinkley (born 1974), Scottish cricketer
- Jasper Brinkley (born 1985), American football player
- Jesse Brinkley (born 1976), American boxer
- Joel Brinkley (1952–2014), New York Times journalist
- John Brinkley (astronomer) (1763–1835), Astronomer Royal of Ireland
- John R. Brinkley (1885–1941), American "goat gland" doctor also known for his radio broadcasts
- Martin H. Brinkley (born 1966), American lawyer
- Nell Brinkley (1886–1944), American illustrator
- Paul Brinkley (born 1966), American businessman and government official
- Richard Brinkley (died c. 1379), English philosopher and theologian
- Richard Brinkley (16th century) (died c. 1525?), English provincial master
- Rick Brinkley (born 1961), American politician
- Ritch Brinkley (1944–2015), American character actor
- Stephen Brinkley (born c. 1550), English printer of the sixteenth century
- William Brinkley (1917–1993), American writer and journalist
- William Brinkley (Underground Railroad) (c. 1814 – 1887), American Underground Railroad conductor
- William R. Brinkley (1936–2020), American cellular biologist
- William T. Brinkley (1936–1989), American politician
