= Richard Brinkley =

Philosopher and theologian

Richard Brinkley (died c.1379) was an English Franciscan scholastic philosopher and theologian. He was at the University of Oxford in the mid-fourteenth century; he produced a Summa Logicae in a nominalist vein in the 1360s or early 1370s, and other works.
