= Richard Brinkley (16th century) =

Richard Brinkley (probably died 1525) was the Provincial Master of the Franciscans in England in June 1524. He was based in Cambridge.
