= Brinkley High School =

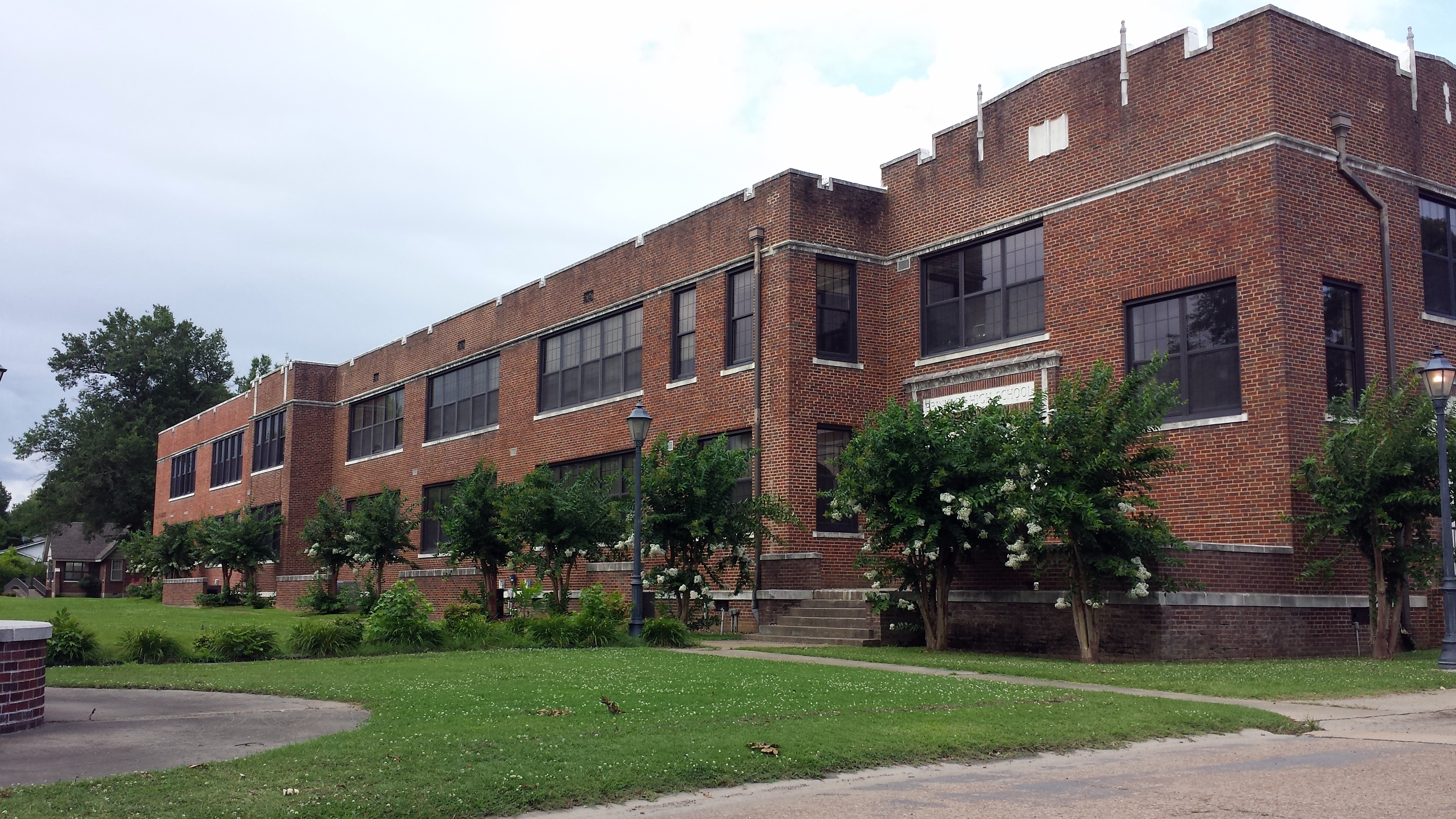

Location
- 100 Tiger Drive; Brinkley, Arkansas 72021; United States
- Coordinates: 33°37′26″N 92°3′40″W

Information
- School type: Public comprehensive
- School district: Brinkley School District
- NCES District ID: 0503630
- Oversight: Arkansas Department of Education (ADE)
- CEEB code: 040290
- NCES School ID: 0503630000112
- Teaching staff: 42.87 (FTE)
- Grades: 7–12
- Enrollment: 167 (2023-2024)
- Student to teacher ratio: 3.90
- Education system: ADE Smart Core curriculum
- Classes offered: Regular, Advanced Placement
- Campus type: Rural
- Colors: Black and gold
- Athletics conference: 1A 7 East (2012-14)
- Sports: Basketball, baseball, softball
- Mascot: Tiger
- Team name: Brinkley Tigers
- Accreditation: ADE
- Feeder schools: Nettleton Junior High School (6-8)
- Affiliation: Arkansas Activities Association (AAA)
- Website: www.brinkleyschools.com

Brinkley High School (BHS) is a comprehensive public junior/senior high school located in Brinkley, Arkansas, United States. For the 2010–11 school year, BHS serves more than 300 students in grades 7 through 12 and is supported by more than 34 educators on a full time equivalent basis. Brinkley High serves portions of Monroe County and Woodruff County and draws students from Brinkley, McCrory, Cotton Plant, Wheatley, Fargo, Moro and Monroe. It is the sole high school of the Brinkley School District.

== Academics ==
The high school is fully accredited by the Arkansas Department of Education (ADE). The assumed course of study for students is to complete the ADE Smart Core curriculum that requires at least 22 units prior to graduation. Students complete regular (core and career focus) courses and exams and may select Advanced Placement (AP) coursework and exams that provide an opportunity for college credit prior to high school graduation.

== Extracurricular activities ==
The Brinkley High School mascot and athletic emblem is the Tiger with black and gold serving as the school colors.

=== Athletics ===
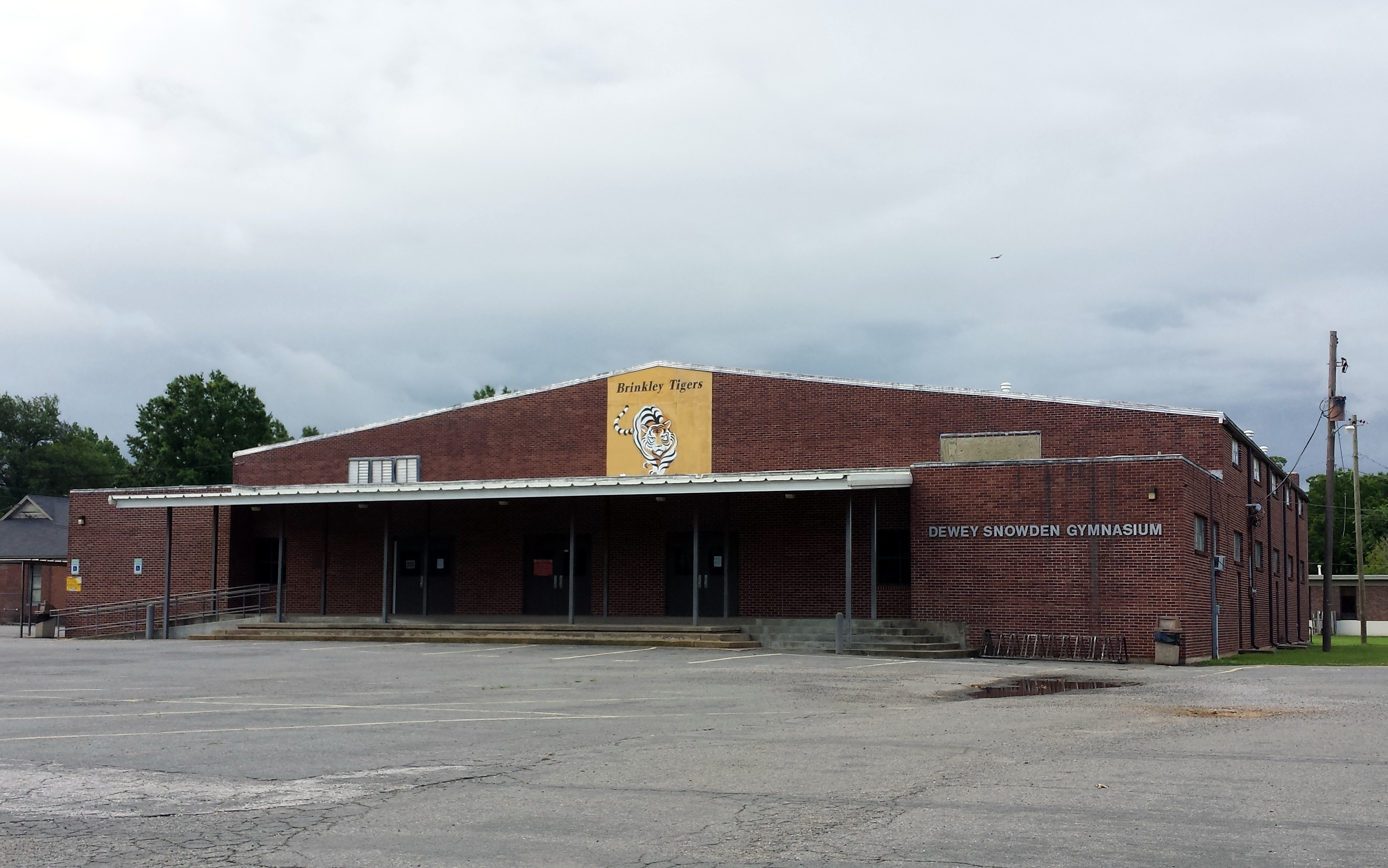
Basketball gym

For 2012–14, the Brinkley Tigers participate in the 2A Classification within the 2A 6 East Conference as administered by the Arkansas Activities Association. The Tigers compete in football, boys and girls golf, boys and girls basketball, baseball, fastpitch softball, boys and girls tennis, and cheer.

== Notable alumni ==
- Sheffield Nelson (Class of 1959), lawyer and politician who ran as the Republican nominee for governor of Arkansas in 1990 against Bill Clinton.
- Varnado Simpson, participant in the My Lai Massacre
