= Brinkley, Arkansas =

- City
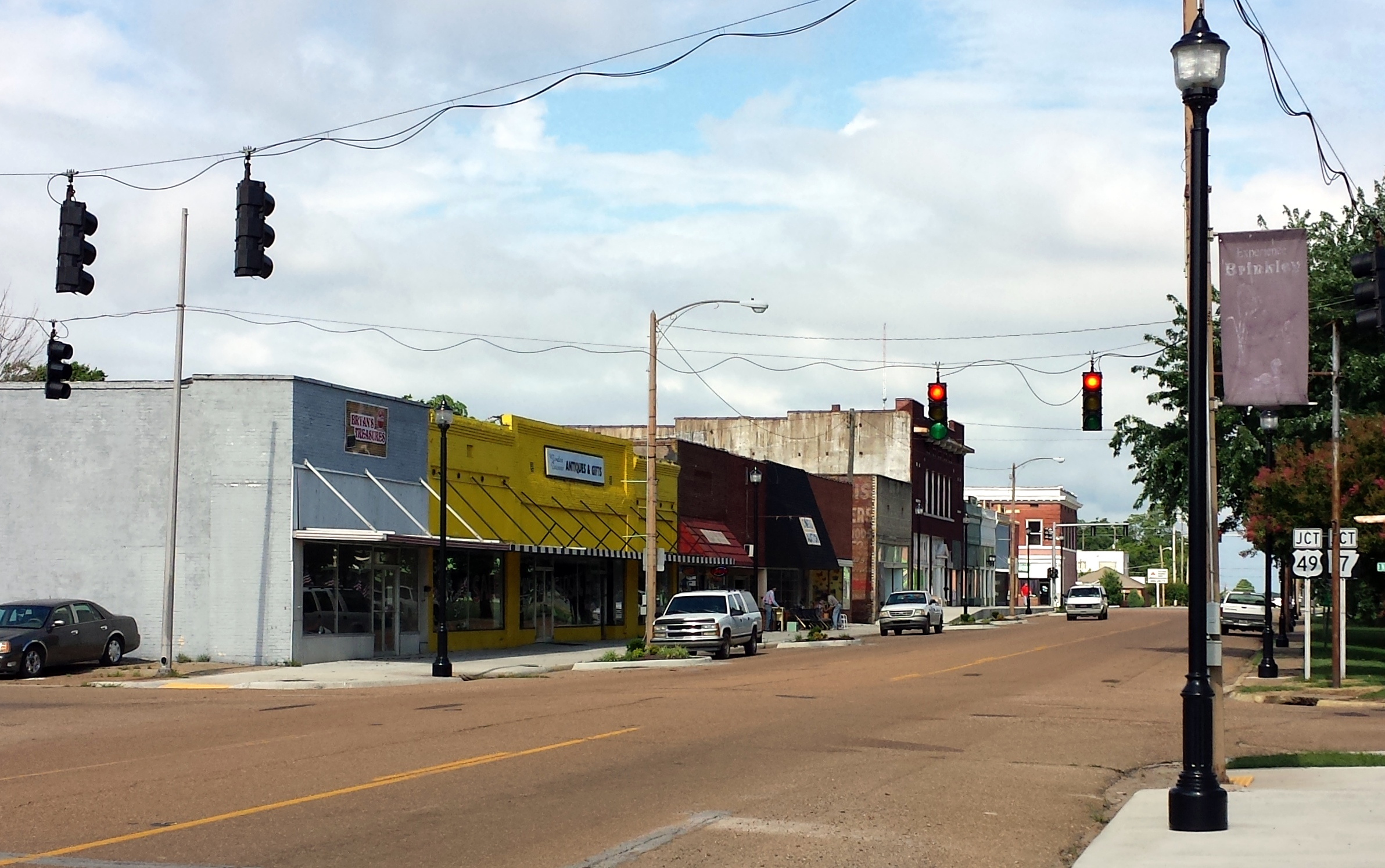
- Downtown Brinkley

- Location in Monroe County, Arkansas
- Coordinates: 34°53′00″N 91°11′34″W
- Country: United States
- State: Arkansas
- County: Monroe

Area
  - Total: 6.14 sq mi (15.91 km^{2})
  - Land: 5.69 sq mi (14.73 km^{2})
  - Water: 0.46 sq mi (1.18 km^{2})
- Elevation: 200 ft (61 m)

Population (2020)
  - Total: 2,700
  - Estimate (2025): 2,468 ▼
  - Density: 474.9/sq mi (183.35/km^{2})
- Time zone: UTC-6 (Central (CST))
  - Summer (DST): UTC-5 (CDT)
- ZIP code: 72021
- Area code: 870
- FIPS code: 05-08950
- GNIS feature ID: 2403926
- Website: cityofbrinkley.org

Brinkley is the most populous city in Monroe County, Arkansas, United States. As of the 2020 census, the population was 2,700, down from 3,188 in 2010.

Located within the Arkansas Delta, Brinkley was founded as a railroad town in 1872. The city has historically been a transportation and agricultural center in the region, more recently developing a reputation for outdoors recreation and the ivory-billed woodpecker. Birding has become important to the city and region following the purported discovery of the ivory-billed woodpecker in 2004, a species thought to be extinct 60 years earlier.

Located halfway between Little Rock and Memphis, the city has used the slogan "We'll Meet You Half-Way" in some of its advertising campaigns.

== History ==
In 1852, a land grant for the construction of rail lines was given to the Little Rock and Memphis Railroad Company, led by its president Robert Campbell Brinkley. Born in North Carolina, Brinkley lived in Memphis, where he served a public career of "noble deeds and generous conduct" and for many years served as president of Planters Bank.

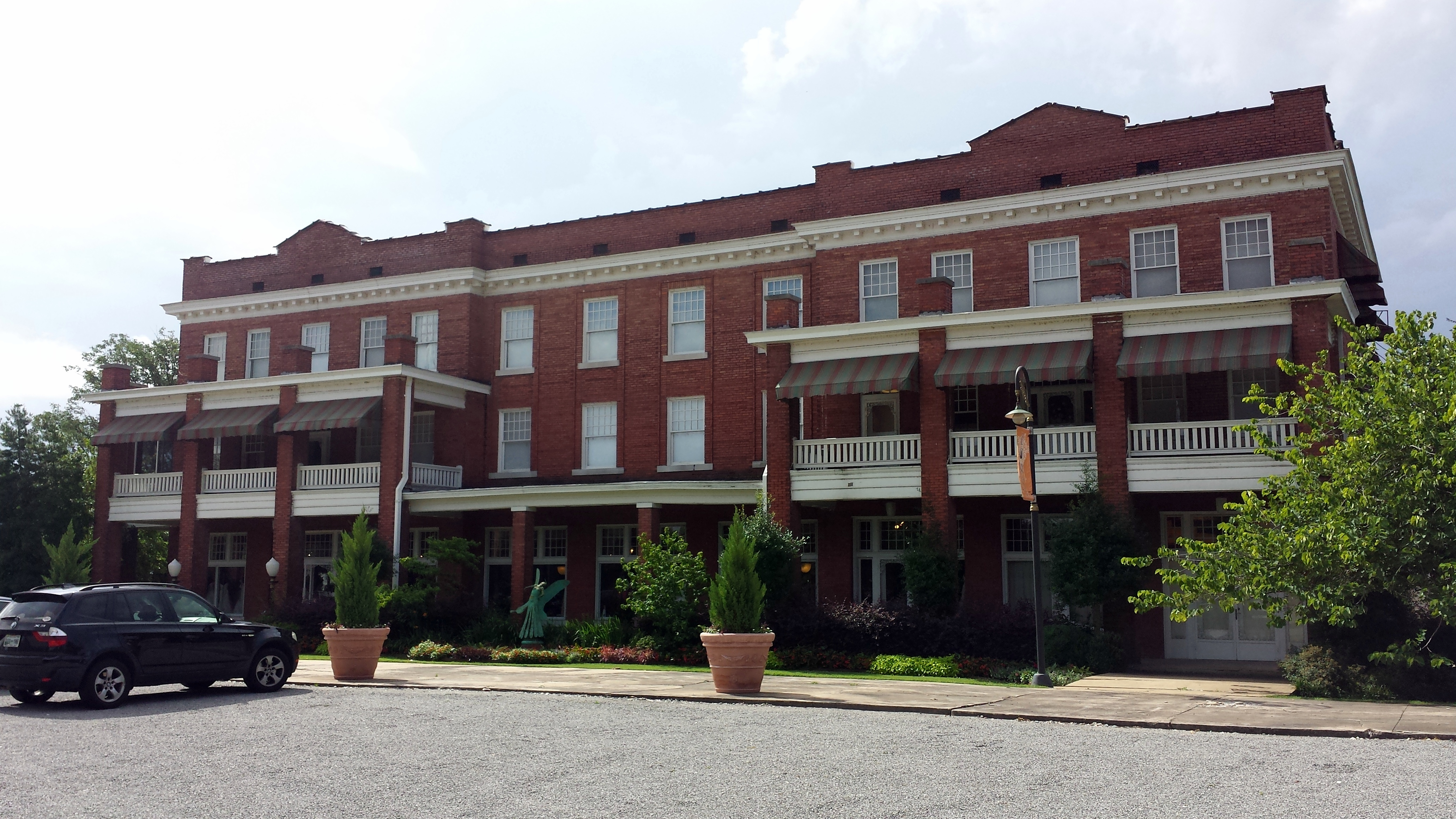
Rusher Hotel, the railroad hotel adjacent to the station

Between 1852 and 1869, the settlement was called "Lick Skillet". When the day's work was completed, the railroad construction crew, mostly all immigrants from neighboring towns, cooked their supper over an open fire and returned to their homes when the last "skillet was licked".

The construction of the rail lines between Little Rock and Memphis brought the city of Brinkley into being. Brinkley is situated in the northern part of Monroe County, the halfway point between the two larger cities. It was laid out in the winter of 1869 on lands belonging to the railroad.

A petition request was granted to incorporate Brinkley on August 6, 1872, at which time the town had 50 qualified voters. The original charter was filed with the Arkansas Secretary of State on August 21, 1872. The Cotton Plant Railroad (later called the Batesville and Brinkley Railroad and the White and Black River Valley Railway) originated from the town in 1879, and the Texas and St. Louis Railway was built through Brinkley in 1883. The Brinkley, Helena and Indian Bay Railway connected to town in about 1889, the line later becoming the Arkansas Midland Railroad and subsequently the St. Louis, Iron Mountain and Southern Railway in 1910.

On March 8, 1909, much of the town was destroyed by a violent F4 tornado, which resulted in 49 deaths. Entire families were lost to the tornado, and approximately 800 buildings in the community were destroyed. The tornado was 2/3 of a mile wide.

Duck hunting is a major source of income for the city during the months of November, December and January. With many rice fields flooded for the winter, and being located on the Mississippi Flyway, ducks are very prevalent throughout the region. Men and women from around the United States come to Brinkley for guided hunts throughout the season.

== Geography ==
Brinkley is in northern Monroe County, 69 miles (111 km) east of Little Rock, the Arkansas capital, and 72 miles (116 km) west-southwest of Memphis, Tennessee. U.S. Routes 70 and 49 join in the city as Main Street, with US 70 turning east on Cypress Street in the center of town. US 70 leads east-northeast 5 miles (8 km) to Wheatley and west-southwest 14 miles (23 km) to Biscoe, while US 49 leads north-northeast 74 miles (119 km) to Jonesboro and southeast 51 miles (82 km) to Helena-West Helena. The Brinkley city limits extend north along US 49 to its interchange with Interstate 40, which connects Memphis and Little Rock.

According to the United States Census Bureau, the city has a total area of 6.14 square miles (15.9 km^{2}), of which 5.69 square miles (14.7 km^{2}) are land and 0.46 square miles (1.19 km^{2}), or 7.41%, are water.

=== Climate ===
The climate in this area is characterized by hot, humid summers and generally mild to cool winters. According to the Köppen Climate Classification system, Brinkley has a humid subtropical climate, abbreviated "Cfa" on climate maps.

Climate data for Brinkley, Arkansas (1991–2020 normals, extremes 1883–2017)
Month	Jan	Feb	Mar	Apr	May	Jun	Jul	Aug	Sep	Oct	Nov	Dec	Year
Record high °F (°C)	80 (27)	85 (29)	92 (33)	99 (37)	100 (38)	110 (43)	111 (44)	110 (43)	109 (43)	97 (36)	90 (32)	82 (28)	111 (44)
Mean maximum °F (°C)	67.8 (19.9)	72.8 (22.7)	78.5 (25.8)	84.5 (29.2)	89.7 (32.1)	94.7 (34.8)	97.5 (36.4)	98.0 (36.7)	94.4 (34.7)	87.1 (30.6)	78.7 (25.9)	68.7 (20.4)	99.7 (37.6)
Mean daily maximum °F (°C)	47.8 (8.8)	52.7 (11.5)	61.3 (16.3)	70.9 (21.6)	79.6 (26.4)	87.2 (30.7)	90.1 (32.3)	89.9 (32.2)	83.9 (28.8)	73.6 (23.1)	60.6 (15.9)	51.3 (10.7)	70.7 (21.5)
Daily mean °F (°C)	39.2 (4.0)	43.2 (6.2)	51.4 (10.8)	60.7 (15.9)	69.9 (21.1)	78.1 (25.6)	81.1 (27.3)	80.0 (26.7)	73.2 (22.9)	62.2 (16.8)	50.5 (10.3)	42.4 (5.8)	61.0 (16.1)
Mean daily minimum °F (°C)	30.6 (−0.8)	33.7 (0.9)	41.5 (5.3)	50.6 (10.3)	60.3 (15.7)	69.0 (20.6)	72.0 (22.2)	70.1 (21.2)	62.6 (17.0)	50.7 (10.4)	40.5 (4.7)	33.5 (0.8)	51.3 (10.7)
Mean minimum °F (°C)	14.4 (−9.8)	18.6 (−7.4)	27.0 (−2.8)	35.7 (2.1)	47.3 (8.5)	58.1 (14.5)	64.2 (17.9)	61.6 (16.4)	46.9 (8.3)	36.1 (2.3)	27.0 (−2.8)	18.7 (−7.4)	10.9 (−11.7)
Record low °F (°C)	−10 (−23)	−12 (−24)	10 (−12)	23 (−5)	31 (−1)	39 (4)	45 (7)	44 (7)	30 (−1)	20 (−7)	10 (−12)	−7 (−22)	−12 (−24)
Average precipitation inches (mm)	3.78 (96)	4.09 (104)	4.98 (126)	5.56 (141)	6.27 (159)	3.51 (89)	3.33 (85)	3.14 (80)	2.96 (75)	3.97 (101)	4.52 (115)	5.08 (129)	51.19 (1,300)
Average snowfall inches (cm)	0.7 (1.8)	1.1 (2.8)	0.8 (2.0)	0.0 (0.0)	0.0 (0.0)	0.0 (0.0)	0.0 (0.0)	0.0 (0.0)	0.0 (0.0)	0.0 (0.0)	0.1 (0.25)	0.0 (0.0)	2.7 (6.9)
Average precipitation days (≥ 0.01 in)	8.3	6.8	8.3	7.9	9.3	6.1	6.2	4.2	4.9	6.5	7.9	7.8	84.2
Average snowy days (≥ 0.1 in)	0.3	0.8	0.2	0.0	0.0	0.0	0.0	0.0	0.0	0.0	0.0	0.1	1.4
Source: NOAA (mean maxima/minima 1981–2010)

== Demographics ==
Historical population
Census	Pop.	Note	%±
1880	327		—
1890	1,510		361.8%
1900	1,648		9.1%
1910	1,740		5.6%
1920	2,714		56.0%
1930	3,046		12.2%
1940	3,409		11.9%
1950	4,173		22.4%
1960	4,636		11.1%
1970	5,275		13.8%
1980	4,909		−6.9%
1990	4,232		−13.8%
2000	3,940		−6.9%
2010	3,188		−19.1%
2020	2,700		−15.3%
2025 (est.)	2,468	▼	−8.6%
U.S. Decennial Census; 2014 Estimate

=== 2020 census ===
As of the 2020 census, Brinkley had a population of 2,700. There were 759 families residing in the city. The median age was 44.6 years. 23.0% of residents were under the age of 18 and 22.1% of residents were 65 years of age or older. For every 100 females there were 88.4 males, and for every 100 females age 18 and over there were 85.1 males age 18 and over.

0.0% of residents lived in urban areas, while 100.0% lived in rural areas.

There were 1,175 households in Brinkley, of which 26.4% had children under the age of 18 living in them. Of all households, 32.1% were married-couple households, 22.9% were households with a male householder and no spouse or partner present, and 40.4% were households with a female householder and no spouse or partner present. About 38.3% of all households were made up of individuals and 16.7% had someone living alone who was 65 years of age or older.

There were 1,445 housing units, of which 18.7% were vacant. The homeowner vacancy rate was 3.0% and the rental vacancy rate was 15.7%.

Racial composition as of the 2020 census
Race	Number	Percent
White	1,123	41.6%
Black or African American	1,395	51.7%
American Indian and Alaska Native	5	0.2%
Asian	20	0.7%
Native Hawaiian and Other Pacific Islander	1	0.0%
Some other race	24	0.9%
Two or more races	132	4.9%
Hispanic or Latino (of any race)	48	1.8%

=== 2000 census ===
As of the census of 2000, there were 3,940 people, 1,543 households, and 972 families residing in the city. The population density was 719.0 inhabitants per square mile (277.6/km^{2}). There were 1,731 housing units at an average density of 315.9 units per square mile (122.0 units/km^{2}). The racial makeup of the city was 49.09% White, 49.05% Black or African American, 0.18% Native American, 0.30% Asian, 0.05% Pacific Islander, 0.30% from other races, and 1.62% from two or more races. 1.12% of the population were Hispanic or Latino of any race.

There were 1,543 households, out of which 31.8% had children under the age of 18 living with them, 39.5% were married couples living together, 20.8% had a female householder with no husband present, and 37.0% were non-families. 33.7% of all households were made up of individuals, and 15.8% had someone living alone who was 65 years of age or older. The average household size was 2.48 and the average family size was 3.23.

In the city, the population was spread out, with 31.0% under the age of 18, 8.4% from 18 to 24, 22.4% from 25 to 44, 20.7% from 45 to 64, and 17.4% who were 65 years of age or older. The median age was 36 years. For every 100 females, there were 81.5 males. For every 100 females age 18 and over, there were 73.5 males.

The median income for a household in the city was $19,868, and the median income for a family was $27,820. Males had a median income of $26,117 versus $16,714 for females. The per capita income for the city was $12,441. About 23.8% of families and 30.9% of the population were below the poverty line, including 38.6% of those under age 18 and 18.7% of those age 65 or over.

== Arts and culture ==
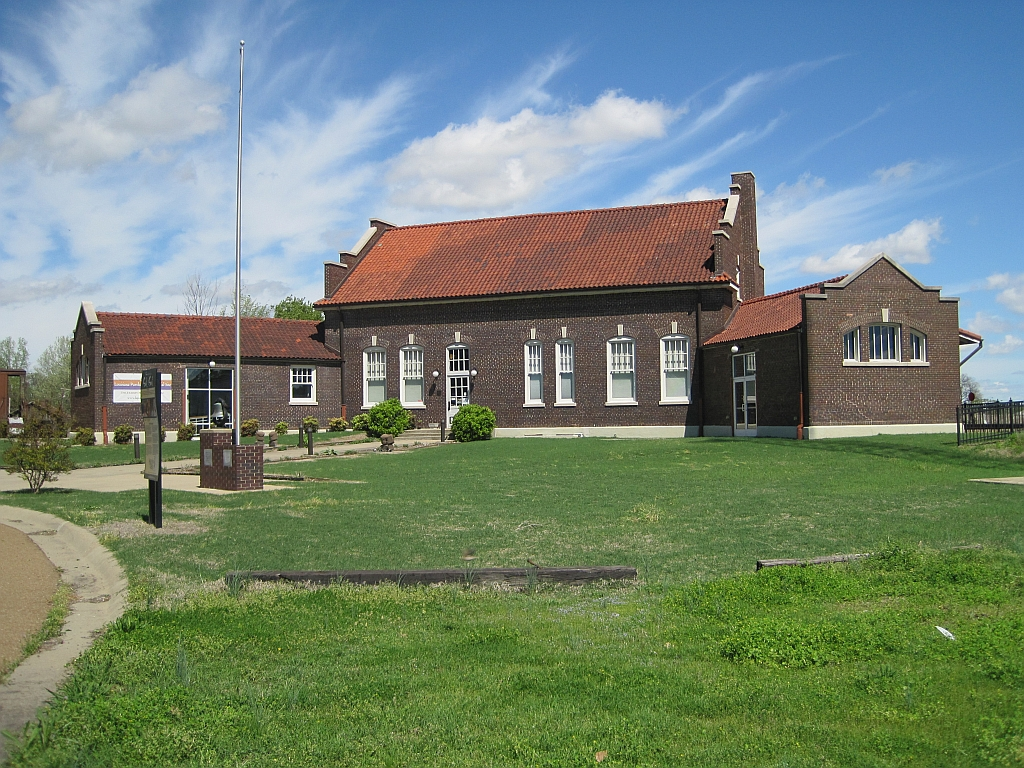
Central Delta Depot Museum in Brinkley

=== Tourism ===
Brinkley is located 10 miles (16 km) east of the Cache River National Wildlife Refuge, where in February 2004 the ivory-billed woodpecker was purportedly rediscovered after having thought to be extinct for over 60 years. Brinkley has attempted to capitalize on its good fortune of being the largest city near the refuge and the rediscovery of the woodpecker.

In addition to the ivory-billed sightings, since July 2005 at least two confirmed reports of bald eagle nests have been found in the Monroe County area. Further, the swamps of the Cache River are believed to contain among the oldest cypress trees in the United States.

Brinkley opened a convention center in 1996 which can seat up to 600 people; in February 2006 the center hosted a conference commemorating the second anniversary of the ivory-billed woodpecker's rediscovery.

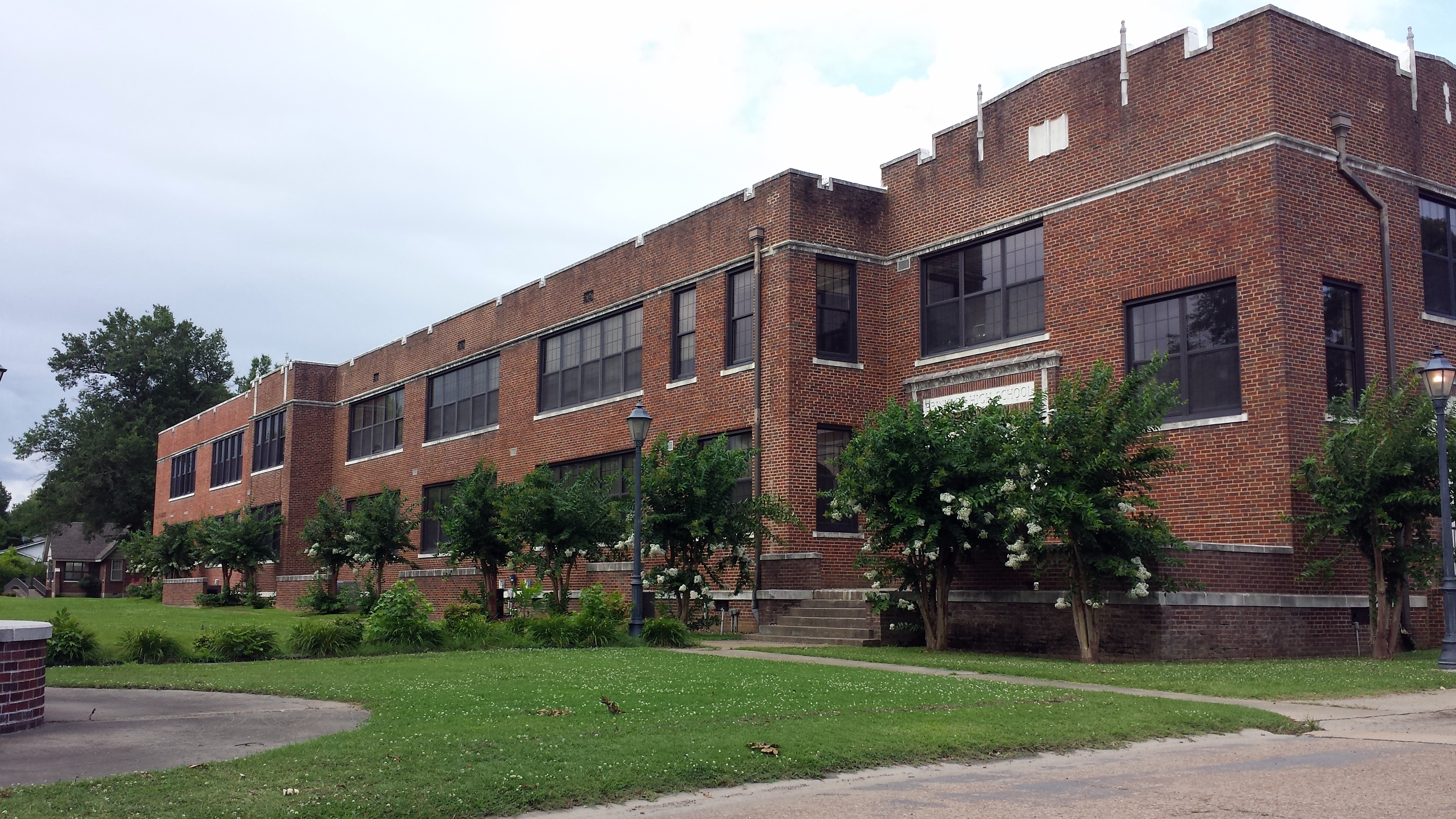
Brinkley High School

== Education ==
Public education for elementary and secondary school students is provided by the Brinkley School District, which leads to graduation from Brinkley High School.

== Infrastructure ==
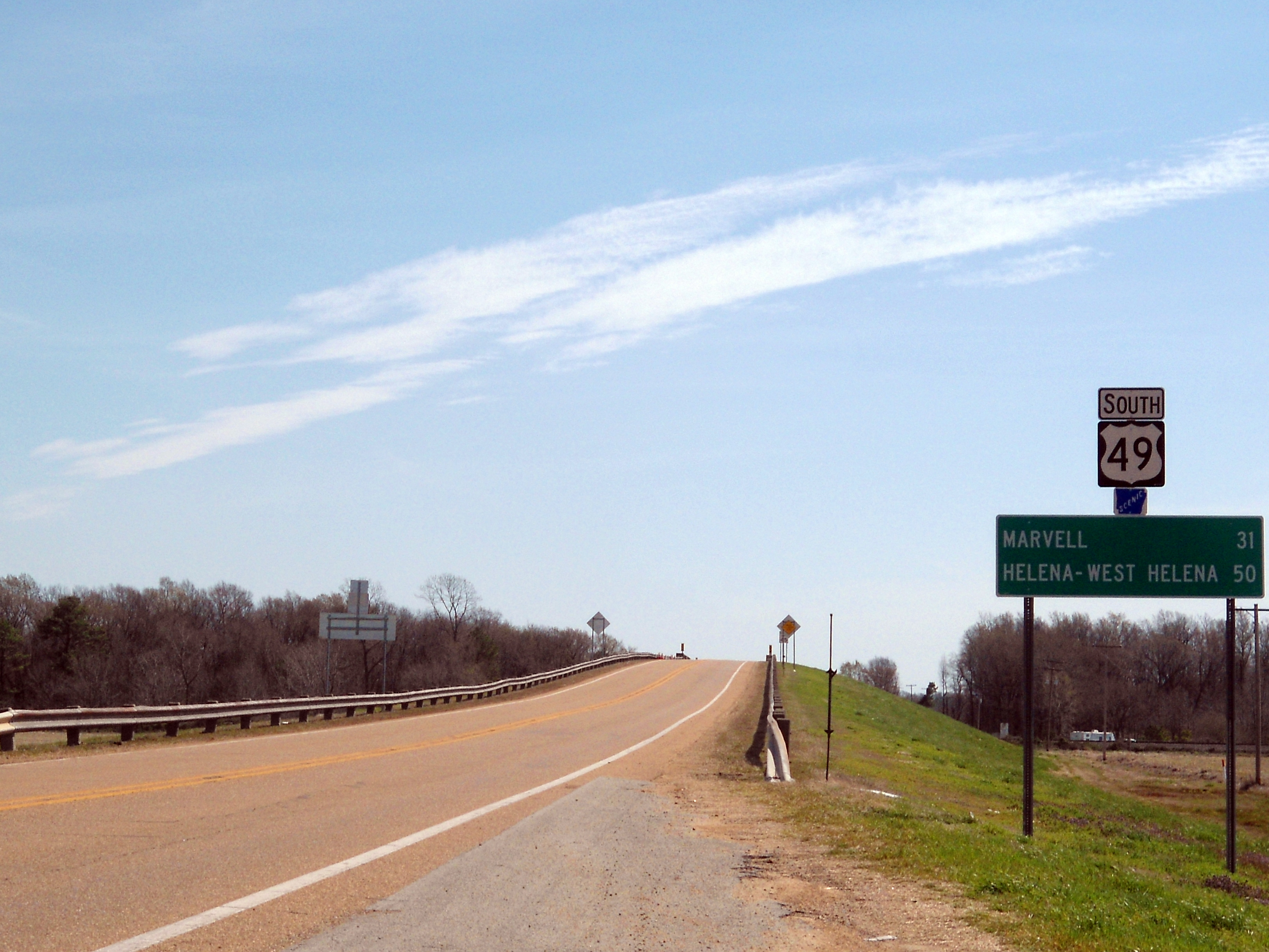
Highway 49 south of Brinkley

=== Transportation ===
From its ties to the transportation industry, the city of Brinkley continues to maintain a position at the center of major transportation arteries. Brinkley is located in Monroe County in the rich relics from the past and rolling farmlands of the Arkansas Delta. The halfway point between Little Rock and Memphis, it is a convenient oasis for travelers along Interstate 40 (I-40), one of the busiest interstates in the United States. The city is also located on U.S. Route 49 (US 49), providing transit north–south, and US 70, an additional east–west corridor.

Intercity bus service to the city is provided by Jefferson Lines.

== Notable people ==
- Dorathy M. Allen, the first woman elected to the Arkansas Senate
- Al Bell, record producer, songwriter, and record executive
- Curtis Burrow, former member of the Green Bay Packers
- Jerry Eckwood, former Arkansas Razorbacks football player and member of the Tampa Bay Buccaneers.
- John Handcox, Great Depression-era tenant farmer and union advocate renowned for his politically charged songs and poetry
- Betty Cooper Hearnes, Missouri state representative
- Louis Jordan, born in Brinkley, jazz and early rock & roll musician inducted in the Rock and Roll Hall of Fame
- Herbert "Flight Time" Lang, current member of the Harlem Globetrotters basketball team and three-time participant in The Amazing Race
- Tommy Robinson, former Pulaski County sheriff, 2nd District congressman, and gubernatorial candidate

== See also ==
- Gazzola and Vaccaro Building
- St. John the Baptist Catholic Church (Brinkley, Arkansas)
