= Brinkley School District =

School district in Arkansas, United States

Coordinates: 34.8772°N 91.1953°W

Address
- 200 Tiger Drive Brinkley, Arkansas, 72021; United States

District information
- Type: Public
- Grades: PreK–12
- NCES District ID: 0503630

Students and staff
- Students: 457
- Teachers: 53.06
- Staff: 47.82
- Student–teacher ratio: 8.61

Other information
- Website: www.brinkleyschools.com

Brinkley School District is a public school district in Brinkley, Monroe County, Arkansas, United States.

== Schools ==
- C. B. Partee Elementary School, serving prekindergarten through grade 6.
- Brinkley High School, serving grades 7 through 12.
