= Prairie County Courthouse =

Prairie County Courthouse may refer to:

- Prairie County Courthouse (Des Arc, Arkansas), listed on the National Register of Historic Places (NRHP)
- Prairie County Courthouse (DeValls Bluff, Arkansas), NRHP-listed
