= National Register of Historic Places listings in Prairie County, Arkansas =

Location of Prairie County in Arkansas

This is a list of the National Register of Historic Places listings in Prairie County, Arkansas.

This is intended to be a complete list of the properties on the National Register of Historic Places in Prairie County, Arkansas, United States.

There are 15 properties listed on the National Register in the county. Another three properties were once listed but have been removed.

Contents: Counties in Arkansas
- Arkansas
- Ashley
- Baxter
- Benton
- Boone
- Bradley
- Calhoun
- Carroll
- Chicot
- Clark
- Clay
- Cleburne
- Cleveland
- Columbia
- Conway
- Craighead
- Crawford
- Crittenden
- Cross
- Dallas
- Desha
- Drew
- Faulkner
- Franklin
- Fulton
- Garland
- Grant
- Greene
- Hempstead
- Hot Spring
- Howard
- Independence
- Izard
- Jackson
- Jefferson
- Johnson
- Lafayette
- Lawrence
- Lee
- Lincoln
- Little River
- Logan
- Lonoke
- Madison
- Marion
- Miller
- Mississippi
- Monroe
- Montgomery
- Nevada
- Newton
- Ouachita
- Perry
- Phillips
- Pike
- Poinsett
- Polk
- Pope
- Prairie
- Pulaski (Little Rock)
- Randolph
- St. Francis
- Saline
- Scott
- Searcy
- Sebastian
- Sevier
- Sharp
- Stone
- Union
- Van Buren
- Washington
- White
- Woodruff
- Yell

This National Park Service list is complete through NPS recent listings posted December 19, 2025.

== Current listings ==
	Name on the Register	Image	Date listed	Location	City or town	Description
1	American Legion Hut-Des Arc	American Legion Hut-Des Arc	June 9, 1995 (#95000692)	206 Erwin St. 34°58′34″N 91°29′41″W	Des Arc	
2	Bethel House	Bethel House	December 22, 1982 (#82000872)	Erwin and 2nd Sts. 34°58′32″N 91°29′40″W	Des Arc	
3	Bedford Brown Bethell House	Bedford Brown Bethell House	December 4, 1978 (#78000619)	2nd and Curran Sts. 34°58′30″N 91°29′39″W	Des Arc	
4	Castleberry Hotel	Castleberry Hotel	September 19, 2007 (#07000960)	61 Main St. 34°47′15″N 91°27′31″W	De Valls Bluff	1925 Craftsman style hotel
5	De Valls Bluff Waterworks	De Valls Bluff Waterworks	September 20, 2009 (#07000969)	Junction of Hazel and Rumbaugh Sts. 34°46′58″N 91°27′47″W	De Valls Bluff	1936 Public Works Administration waterworks
6	Des Arc High School Home Economics Building		September 14, 2021 (#100006928)	708 Main St, 34°58′38″N 91°30′03″W	Des Arc	
7	First Presbyterian Church	First Presbyterian Church	June 14, 1990 (#90000897)	Junction of Main and 5th Sts. 34°58′38″N 91°29′52″W	Des Arc	
8	Frith-Plunkett House	Frith-Plunkett House	June 10, 1982 (#82002127)	8th and Main Sts. 34°58′37″N 91°30′12″W	Des Arc	
9	Kocourek and Son Hardware	Kocourek and Son Hardware	May 26, 2015 (#15000257)	110 E. North Front St. 34°46′52″N 91°34′49″W	Hazen	
10	Oak Grove Cemetery	Oak Grove Cemetery	May 22, 2000 (#01000507)	7th St. 34°58′47″N 91°30′07″W	Des Arc	
11	Prairie County Courthouse	Prairie County Courthouse	April 20, 1995 (#95000457)	Junction of Magnolia and Prairie Sts. 34°46′59″N 91°27′44″W	De Valls Bluff	1939 courthouse built by Works Progress Administration using salvaged materials from 1910 structure
12	Prairie County Courthouse	Prairie County Courthouse	April 18, 1974 (#77000266)	Main St. 34°58′39″N 91°29′39″W	Des Arc	
13	Rock Island Depot	Rock Island Depot	December 22, 1987 (#87002285)	U.S. Route 70; 34°46′50″N 91°34′45″W	Hazen	
14	St. Elizabeth's Catholic Church	St. Elizabeth's Catholic Church	September 23, 2009 (#09000744)	Northeastern corner of the junction of Sycamore and Mason Sts. 34°46′54″N 91°27′34″W	De Valls Bluff	
15	Wingmead		May 23, 2011 (#11000302)	West side of AR 33, ½ mile south of Eason Rd. 34°39′33″N 91°27′23″W	Roe	

== Former listings ==
	Name on the Register	Image	Date listed	Date removed	Location	City or town	Description
1	Barrett-Rogers Building		July 23, 1996 (#98000881)	October 7, 2007	100 N. Hazen Ave. 34°46′53″N 91°34′48″W	Hazen	Demolished on December 10, 2008
2	DeValls Bluff First Baptist Church		November 20, 1993 (#92001616)	September 17, 1999	Jct. of Prairie and Mason Sts.	De Valls Bluff	
3	White River Bridge at DeValls Bluff	White River Bridge at DeValls Bluff	April 9, 1990 (#90000514)	June 1, 2005	U.S. Route 70 over the White River	De Valls Bluff	Imploded July 20, 2004

== See also ==
- List of National Historic Landmarks in Arkansas
- National Register of Historic Places listings in Arkansas
