= John Francis Queeny =

Founder of Monsanto Company (1859–1933)

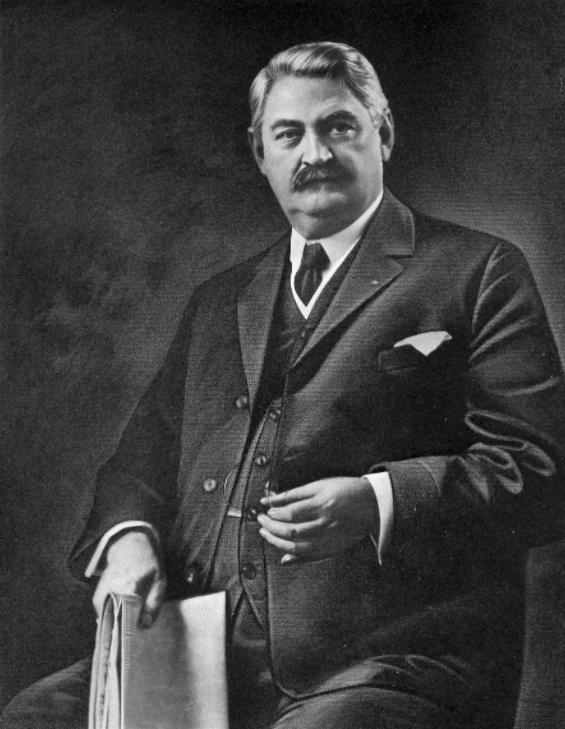
- Born: August 17, 1859; Chicago, Illinois, U.S.
- Died: March 19, 1933 (aged 73); St. Louis, Missouri, U.S.
- Resting place: Bellefontaine Cemetery
- Occupation: Businessman
- Known for: Founder of Monsanto
- Spouse: Olga Mendez Monsanto
- Children: 2, including Edgar

John Francis Queeny (August 17, 1859 – March 19, 1933) was an American businessman, known for founding Monsanto Chemical Works (later Monsanto) in St. Louis, Missouri, on September 26, 1901, with $5,000. He named the company for his wife, Olga Mendez Monsanto.

== Early life ==
Born in Chicago, Illinois, he attended school for six years until the Great Chicago Fire forced him to seek full-time employment at age 12. He was raised in a poor second-generation Irish-American immigrant family. Queeny got a job with Tolman and King for $2.50 per week.

== Career ==
He moved to St. Louis in 1897 to work for Meyer Brothers Drug Company, one of the largest wholesale pharmaceutical companies at the time. Two years later, he spent his life savings on purchasing a sulfur refinery; it burned down the next day. Two years after that, he founded Monsanto Chemical Works and began producing saccharine, which he sold to Meyer Brothers. He started to turn a profit in 1905, but it was not until 1906 that he left Meyer Brothers to work for Monsanto full-time.

In 1928, Queeny retired from Monsanto and was succeeded by his son, Edgar. The company grew to become one of the largest producers of engineered crops in the United States by the 1970s. In 2018, Monsanto was acquired by Bayer for US$66 billion.

== Personal life ==
He married Olga Mendez Monsanto with whom he had two children, including Edgar Monsanto Queeny. Queeny died in 1933 in St. Louis and was buried at the Bellefontaine Cemetery. His name does not appear on the Cemetery's list of Notable Burials https://en.wikipedia.org/wiki/Bellefontaine_Cemetery
