= Frith-Plunkett House =

Historic house in Arkansas, United States

- U.S. National Register of Historic Places
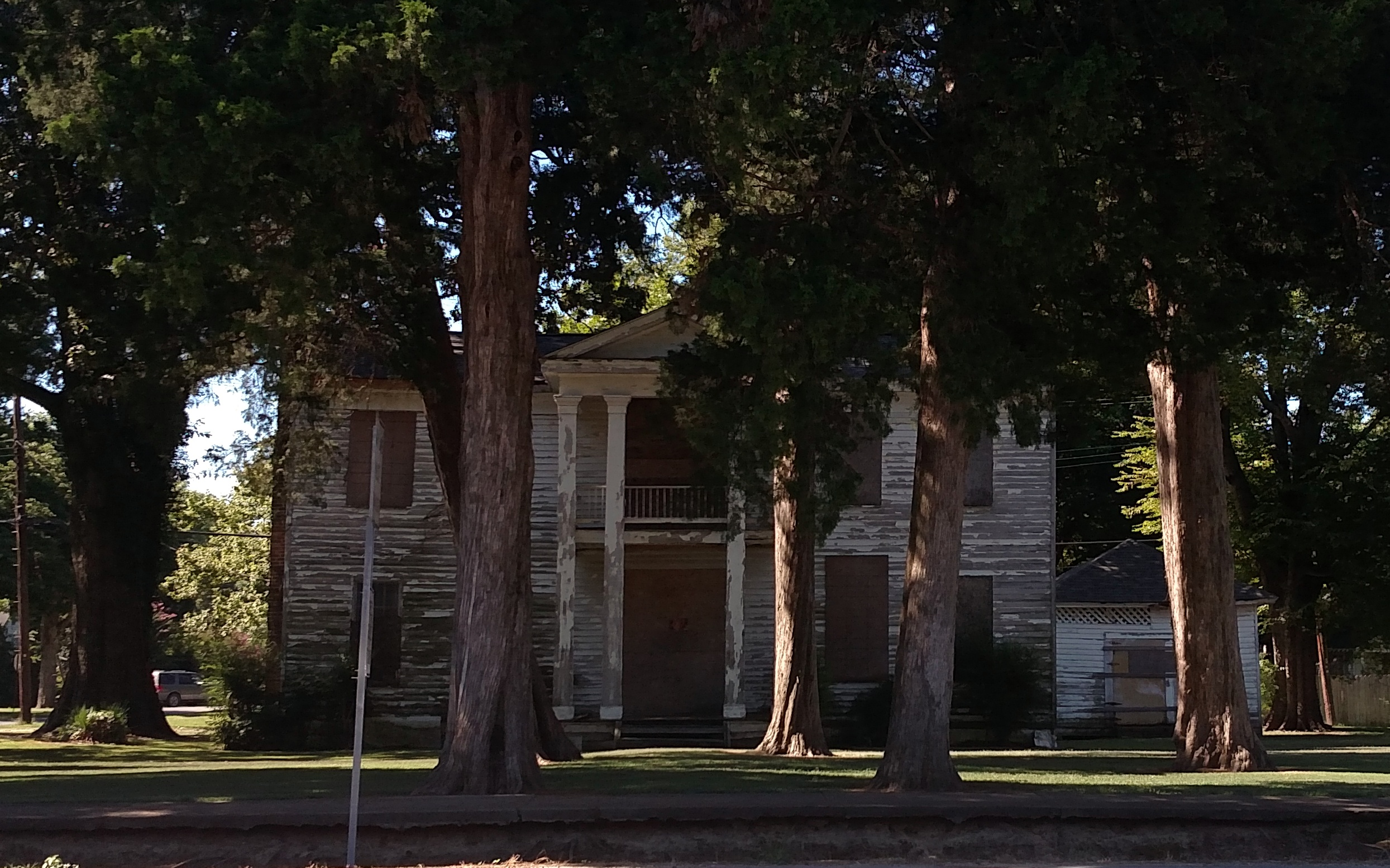

- Location within Arkansas Location within the United States
- Location: 8th and Main Sts., Des Arc, Arkansas
- Coordinates: 34°58′37″N 91°30′12″W
- Area: less than one acre
- Built: 1858
- Architectural style: Greek Revival
- NRHP reference No.: 82002127
- Added to NRHP: June 10, 1982

The Frith-Plunkett House is a historic house at 8th and Main Streets in Des Arc, Arkansas. It is a well-proportioned two-story wood-frame structure, with a gable roof, weatherboard siding, and a foundation of brick piers. A Neoclassical two-story porch projects from the center of what is otherwise a typical I-house, giving it a distinctive Greek Revival character. Built in 1858, it is the oldest standing residence in the city.

The house was listed on the National Register of Historic Places in 1982.

== See also ==
- National Register of Historic Places listings in Prairie County, Arkansas
