= Oak Grove Cemetery (Des Arc, Arkansas) =

Historic cemetery in Arkansas, United States

- U.S. National Register of Historic Places
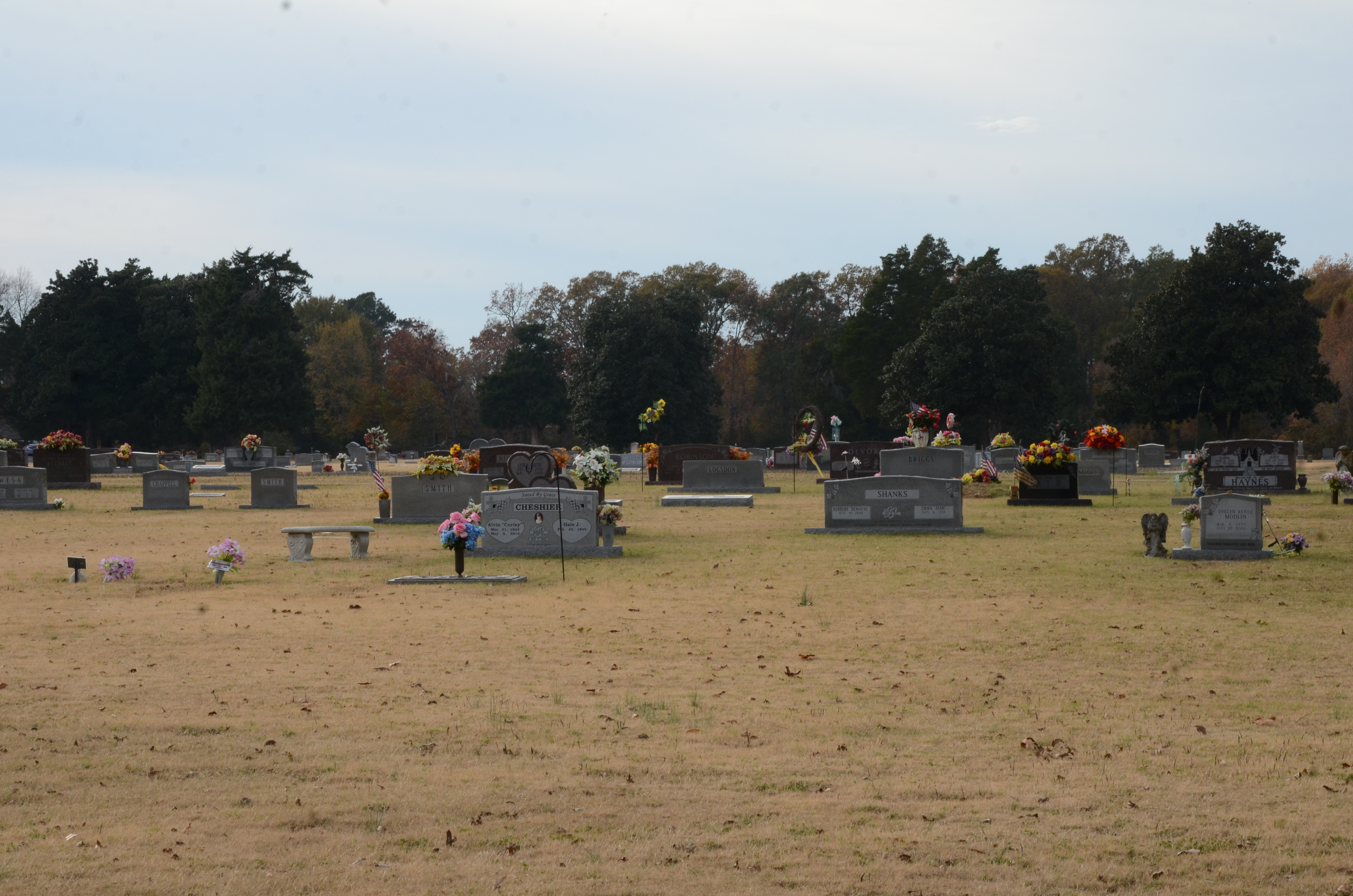

- Location within Arkansas Location within the United States
- Location: 7th St., Des Arc, Arkansas
- Coordinates: 34°58′47″N 91°30′7″W
- Area: 2.5 acres (1.0 ha)
- NRHP reference No.: 01000507
- Added to NRHP: May 22, 2001

Oak Grove Cemetery is a historic cemetery on 7th Street in Des Arc, Arkansas. Established in the 1850s, it is the city's oldest cemetery, occupying about 2.5 acres (1.0 ha) now hemmed in by development. It has 182 documented historic burials, and is one of its few surviving pre-Civil War elements. Most of its interments took place before 1930, and there have been none since 1970.

The cemetery was listed on the National Register of Historic Places in 2001.

== See also ==
- National Register of Historic Places listings in Prairie County, Arkansas
