= Bedford Brown Bethell House =

Historic house in Arkansas, United States

- U.S. National Register of Historic Places
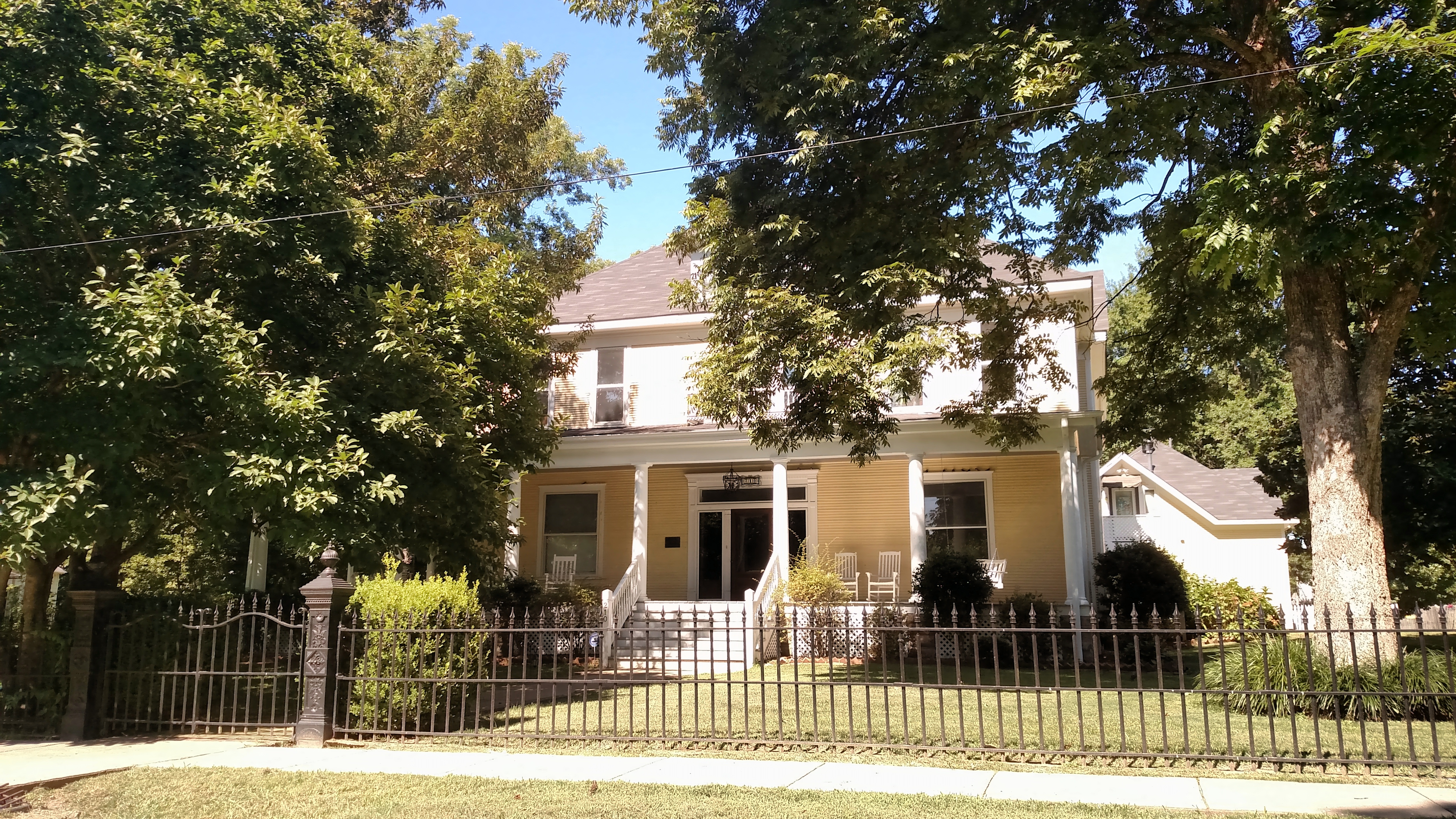

- Location within Arkansas Location within the United States
- Location: 2nd and Curran Sts., Des Arc, Arkansas
- Coordinates: 34°58′30″N 91°29′39″W
- Area: less than one acre
- Built: 1912
- Architect: R.P. Morrison
- Architectural style: Colonial Revival
- NRHP reference No.: 78000619
- Added to NRHP: December 4, 1978

The Bedford Brown Bethell House is a historic house at 2nd and Curran Streets in Des Arc, Arkansas. It is a 2 1/2-story wood-frame structure, with a hip roof and weatherboard siding. The main facade is symmetrical, with a single-story hip-roofed porch that wraps around the left side. The main entrance is framed by sidelight windows, and topped by a transom. A Palladian-style three-part window stands on the second floor above the entrance, with a half-round fanlight. The roof is pierced by hip-roof dormers. The lot is lined on its street-facing sides by an iron fence. The house was built in 1912–13, and is one of the city's finest examples of Colonial Revival architecture.

The house was listed on the National Register of Historic Places in 1978.

== See also ==
- National Register of Historic Places listings in Prairie County, Arkansas
