= Kocourek and Son Hardware =

- U.S. National Register of Historic Places
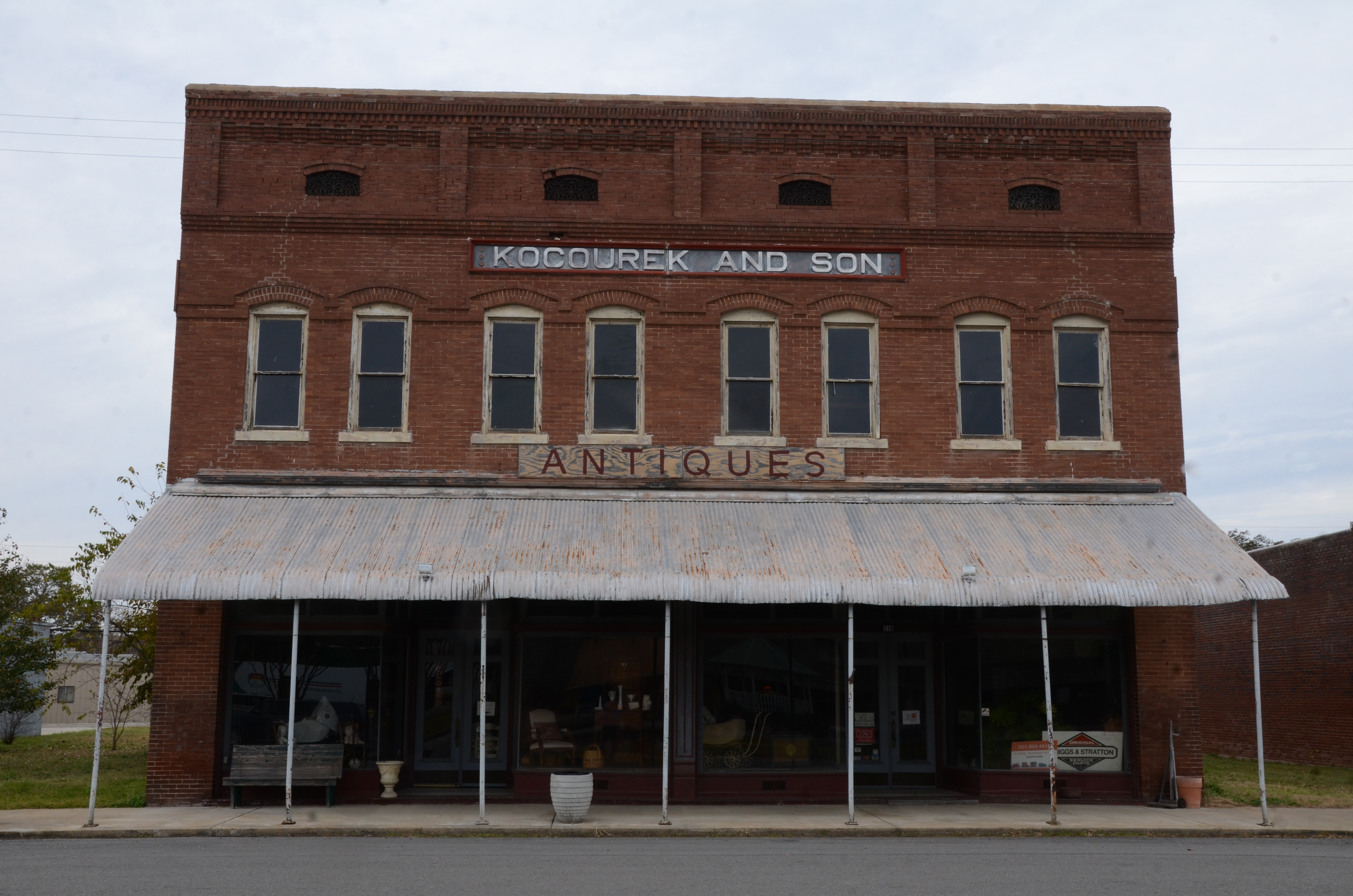

- Location within Arkansas Location within the United States
- Location: 110 E. North Front St., Hazen, Arkansas
- Coordinates: 34°46′52″N 91°34′49″W
- Area: less than one acre
- Built: 1907
- NRHP reference No.: 15000257
- Added to NRHP: May 26, 2015

Kocourek and Son Hardware is a historic commercial building at 110 East North Front Street in Hazen, Arkansas. It is a two-story brick structure, with commercial Italianate styling typical of the early 20th century. It has two storefronts, each with plate glass display windows and recessed entrances, on the ground floor, and four pairs of sash windows on the second, set in segmented-arch openings. Above this are two bands of brick corbelling, with four brick panels articulated by pilasters, each panel with a wrought iron grill at the center. It housed the named hardware store from its construction until 2002, and is the city's finest example of early 20th-century commercial architecture.

The building was listed on the National Register of Historic Places in 2015.

== See also ==
- National Register of Historic Places listings in Prairie County, Arkansas
