= Hazen station =

Hazen
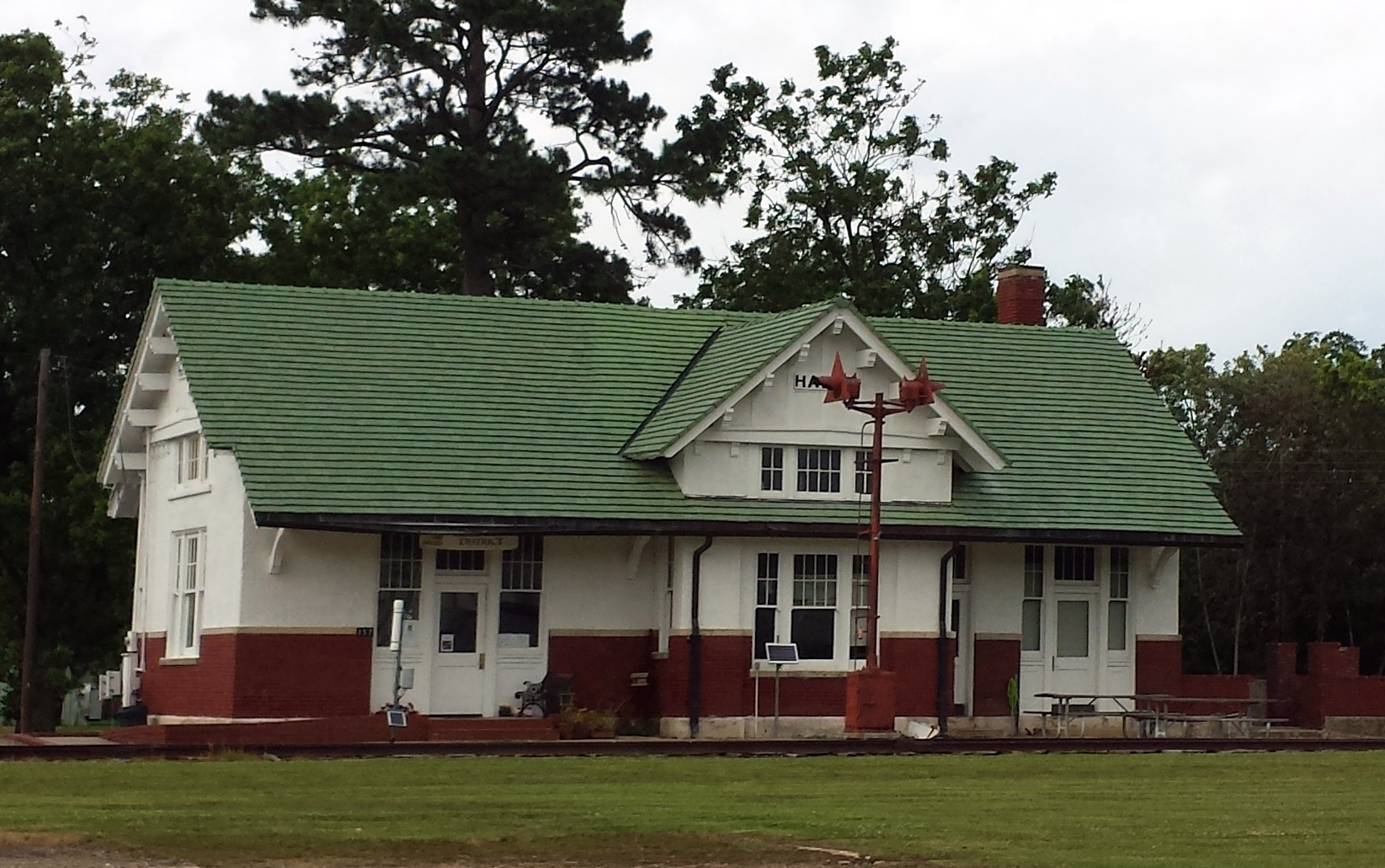
- Hazen station in June 2014.

General information
- Location: 157 North Front Street, Hazen, Arkansas 72064
- System: Former Rock Island Line passenger rail station

Construction
- Structure type: at-grade

History
- Rebuilt: 1915

Services
Preceding station	Chicago, Rock Island and Pacific Railroad	Following station
Screeton toward Tucumcari	Tucumcari – Memphis	Mesa toward Memphis
- Rock Island Depot
- U.S. National Register of Historic Places
- Location within Arkansas Location within the United States
- Location: 157 North Front Street, Hazen, Arkansas
- Coordinates: 34°46′50″N 91°34′45″W
- Area: less than one acre
- Built: 1915
- Architectural style: Bungalow/craftsman, Mission
- NRHP reference No.: 87002285
- Added to NRHP: December 22, 1987
Location

The Rock Island Depot is a historic railroad station at 157 North Front Street, Hazen, Arkansas. It is a single story stuccoed brick building with Mediterranean style, built in 1915 by the Chicago, Rock Island and Pacific Railroad (aka the "Rock Island Line"). Its main facade is oriented south, toward the former railroad tracks, with a projecting telegrapher's booth. It is topped by a tile roof with broad eaves supported by large brackets.

The building was listed on the National Register of Historic Places in 1987.

== See also ==
- National Register of Historic Places listings in Prairie County, Arkansas
