= Edgar Monsanto Queeny =

American businessman (1897–1968)

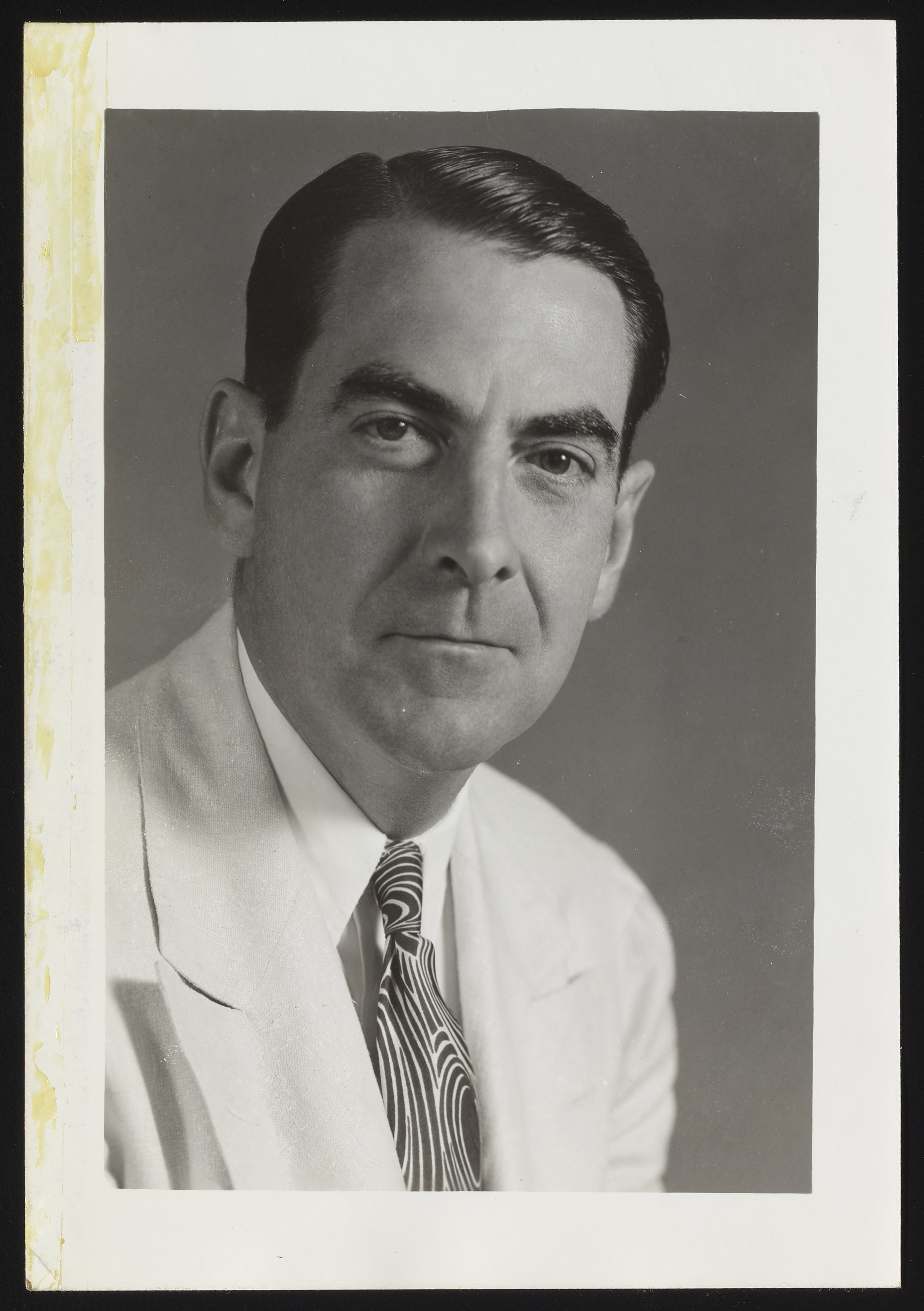
- Queeny in the 1950s
- Born: September 29, 1897; St. Louis, Missouri, U.S.
- Died: July 7, 1968 (aged 70); St. Louis, Missouri, U.S.
- Resting place: Bellefontaine Cemetery
- Occupations: Chairman of Monsanto (1928–1960)
- Political party: Republican
- Father: John Francis Queeny

Edgar Monsanto Queeny (September 29, 1897 – July 7, 1968) was an American businessman who served as chairman of the Monsanto corporation from 1928 until his retirement in 1960.

== Early life ==
Edgar Monsanto Queeny was one of two children born to John Francis Queeny, the founder of Monsanto, and his wife, Olga Méndez Monsanto. During World War I, he served as a seaman in the United States Navy.

== Career ==
After his father retired from the company, Edgar took over the leadership of Monsanto in 1928. At this time, it had just been listed on the stock exchange as a public company. He led the company through the 1929 stock market crisis and its expansion into a major U.S. industrial company with a global presence before he retired in 1960. In 1958, Monsanto's assets had grown from $12 million to $857 million.

Queeny was also a noted conservationist. He published the book Prairie Wings, called a "classic study of American wildfowl in flight," and participated in the production of several nature documentaries, including some from Africa produced in cooperation with Kenyan guide Donald Ker.

Queeny was a Republican. He served as a delegate to the Republican National Convention in 1940 and 1956.

In 1960, Queeny was succeeded as chair of Monsanto by company chemist Charles Allen Thomas, one of the founders of the company's research and development laboratory.

== Personal life ==
Queeny died in St. Louis in 1968. Like his father, he is buried at Bellefontaine Cemetery.

=== Legacy ===
Edgar M. Queeny Park in Town and Country, Missouri is named after him.

In 2011, Queeny's Arkansas farm and family estate, Wingmead, was listed on the National Register of Historic Places.
