= Prairie County Courthouse (DeValls Bluff, Arkansas) =

- U.S. National Register of Historic Places
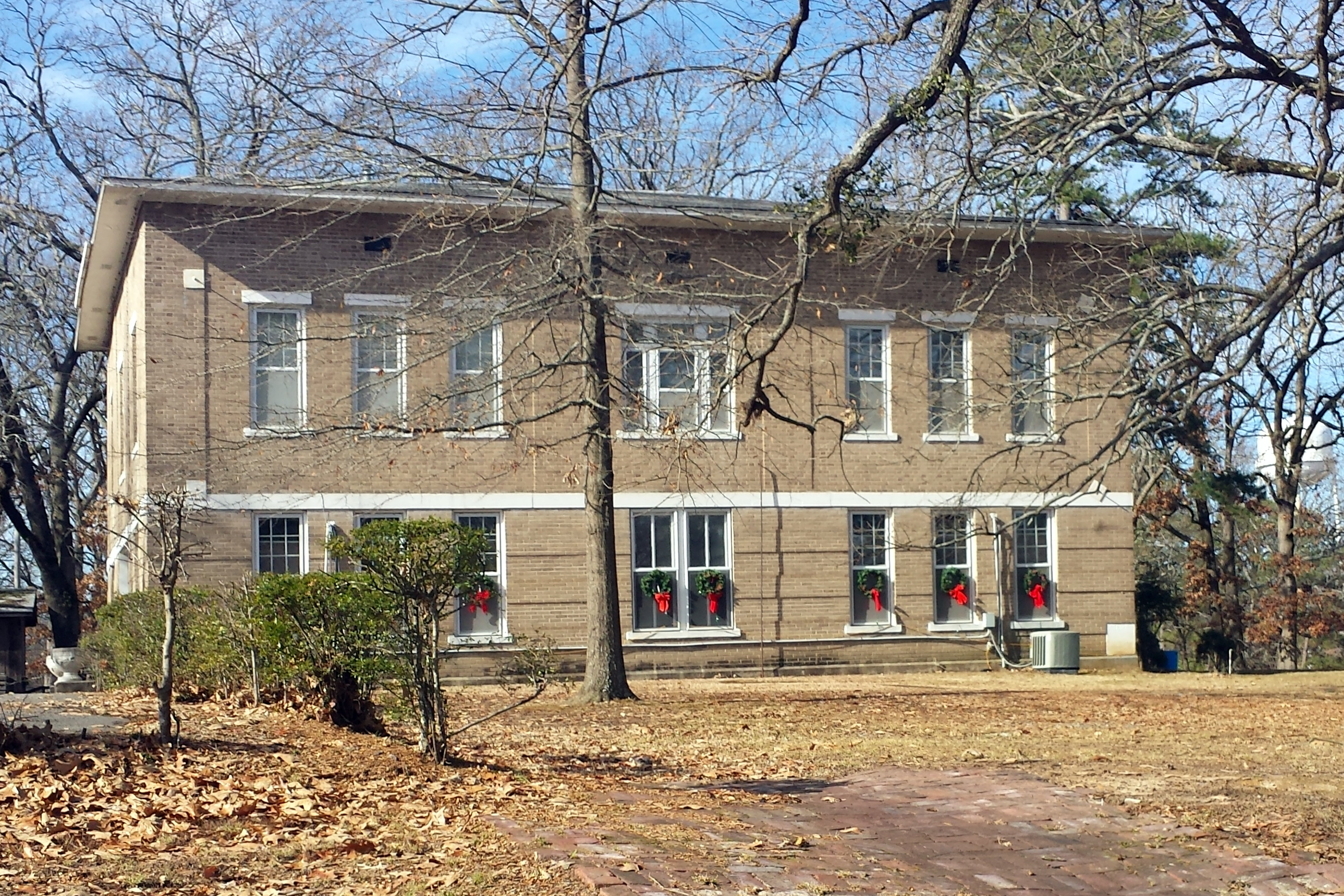

- Location within Arkansas Location within the United States
- Interactive map showing the location of Prairie County Courthouse, DeValls Bluff
- Location: Jct. of Magnolia and Prairie Sts., De Valls Bluff, Arkansas
- Coordinates: 34°46′59″N 91°27′44″W
- Area: less than one acre
- Built: 1939
- Built by: Works Progress Administration
- NRHP reference No.: 95000457
- Added to NRHP: April 20, 1995

The Prairie County Courthouse is a historic courthouse building in DeValls Bluff, Arkansas. DeValls Bluff is, is one of two county seatss in Prairie County; the other is Des Arc, which also has a courthouse.

The courthouse in DeValls Bluff is located at the junction of Magnolia and Prairie Streets, and is a vernacular two story brick building constructed in 1939 with funding assistance from the Works Progress Administration. The building was listed on the National Register of Historic Places in 1995.

== See also ==
- National Register of Historic Places listings in Prairie County, Arkansas
