= Castleberry Hotel =

- U.S. National Register of Historic Places
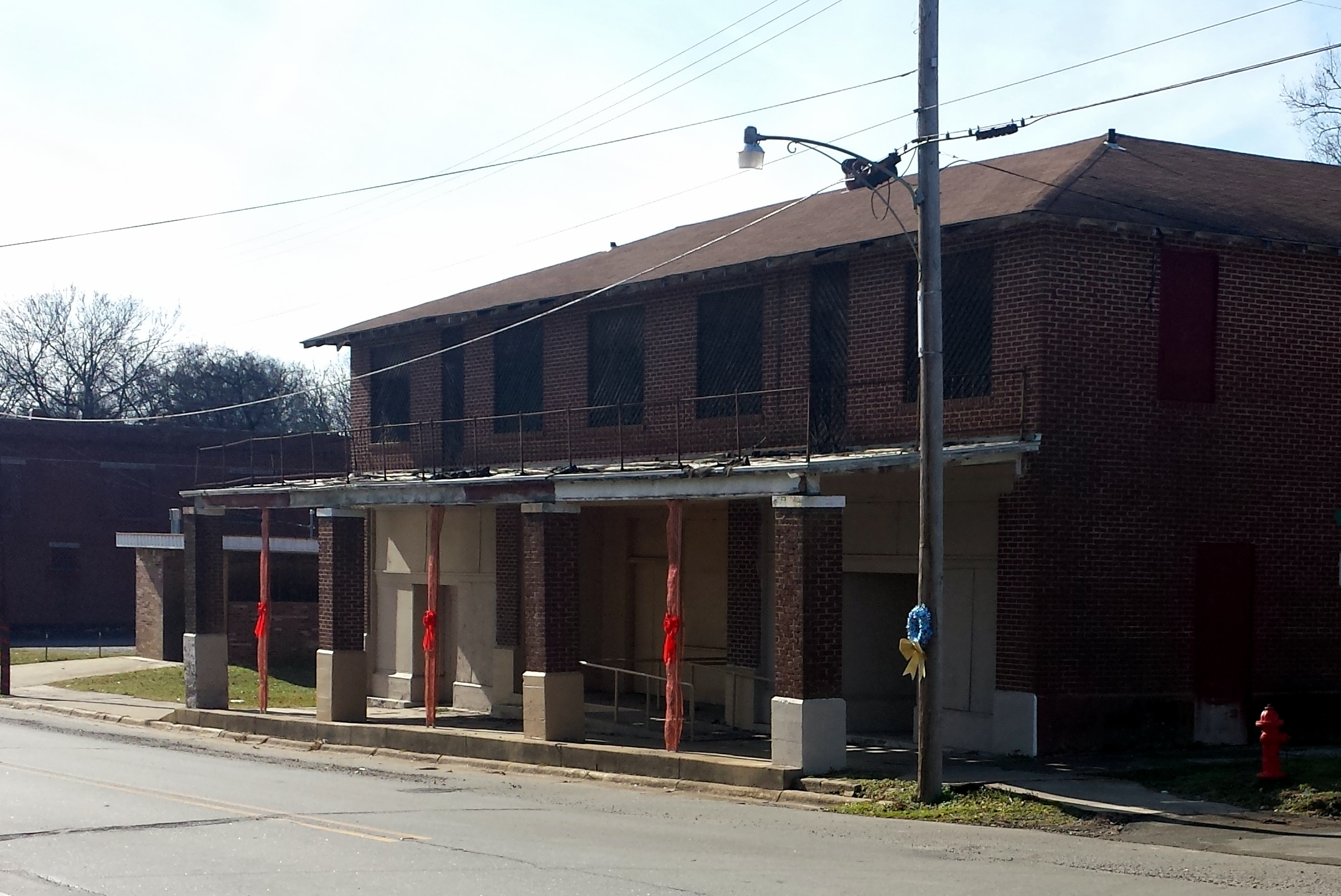

- Location within Arkansas Location within the United States
- Location: 61 Main St., De Valls Bluff, Arkansas
- Coordinates: 34°47′15″N 91°27′31″W
- Area: less than one acre
- Built: 1925
- Architectural style: Bungalow/craftsman
- NRHP reference No.: 07000960
- Added to NRHP: September 19, 2007

The former Castleberry Hotel is a historic commercial building at 61 Main Street (United States Route 70) in De Valls Bluff, Arkansas. It is a two-story masonry structure, built out of brick and capped by a hip roof whose eaves have exposed rafter tails. A porch extends across the sidewalk in front of the building, supported by brick piers. Built in 1925, it is a good local example of Craftsman architecture. It was the town's principal hotel, serving through travelers until the 1960s, when the town was bypassed by interstate highways.

The building was listed on the National Register of Historic Places in 2007.

== See also ==
- National Register of Historic Places listings in Prairie County, Arkansas
