= Queeny Park =

Park located in St. Louis County, Missouri

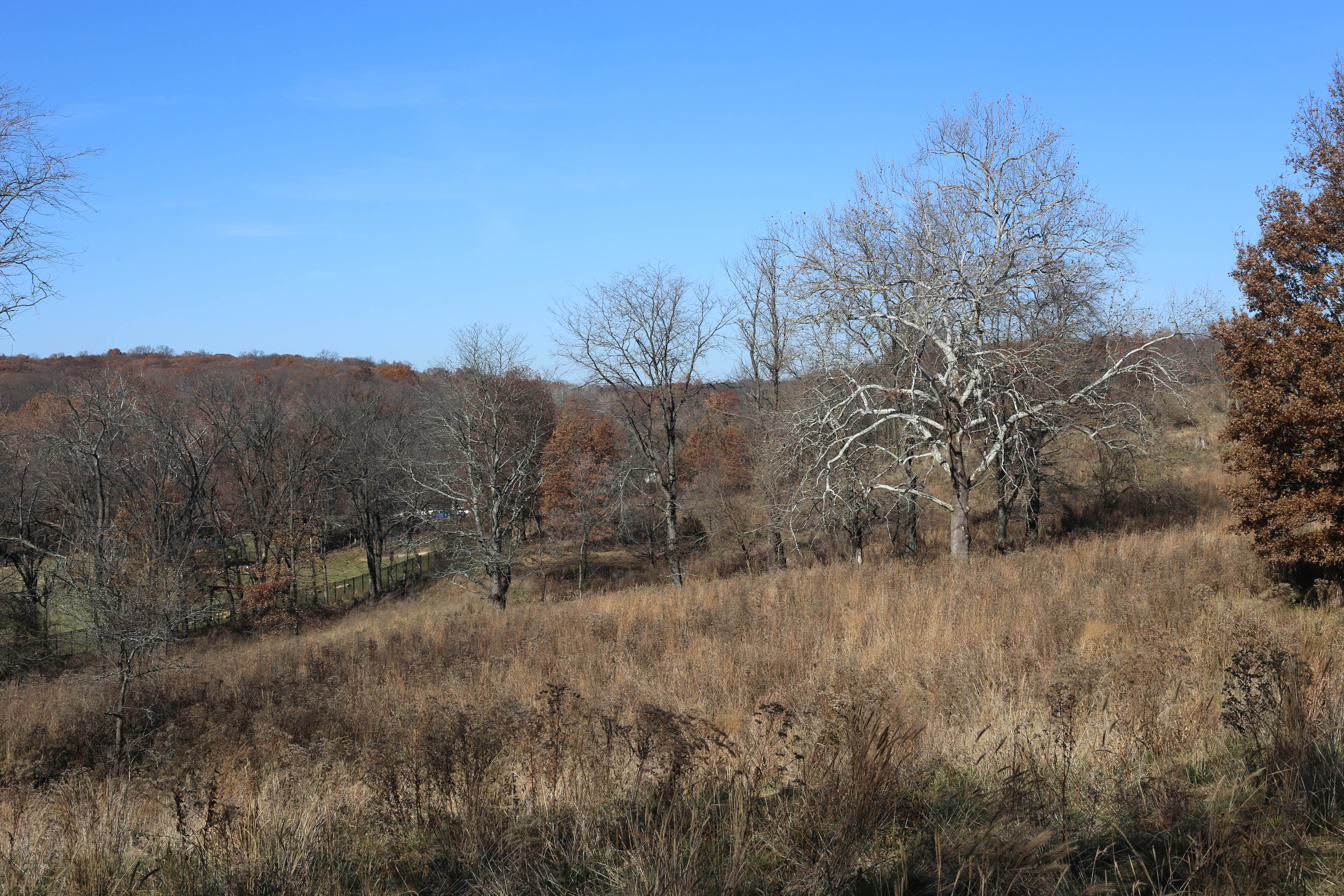
- Interactive map of Queeny Park
- Type: St. Louis County Parks
- Location: Unincorporated St. Louis County, MO
- Coordinates: 38.612320°N 90.490252°W
- Area: 564 acres (228 ha)
- Created: 1974
- Operator: St. Louis County Parks Department
- Status: Open all year (except Easter, Thanksgiving and Christmas)

Queeny Park is a park located in unincorporated St. Louis County, Missouri. It is one of the largest parks in the St. Louis County Parks system.

== Description ==
The 564-acre park includes forest, prairie, and riparian environments. A creek in the Meramec River watershed runs north to south through the park, feeding a fishing pond at the park's southern end.

The park has picnic shelters, public restrooms, a playground, the Tails and Trails Dog Park, and outdoor tennis courts. The Greensfelder Recreation Complex, accessible via the Weidman Road entrance, houses a seasonal ice rink, indoor roller rink, and event space. The park's trails include the 4.4-mile, mixed-gravel-and-pavement Hawk Ridge Trail runs around its perimeter.

The park is frequently used for equestrian events, including on the prairie on the north and west sides.

== History ==
In 1854, Hyacinth Renard built Jarville, a Greek Revival-style home on the land that would later become Queeny Park. The house would be added to the National Register of Historic Places in 1984.

The land around Jarville was eventually purchased by Monsanto chairman Edgar M. Queeny. In 1964, he sold the land to a realty investment company and donated the proceeds to Barnes-Jewish Hospital in St. Louis.

In 1970, the County bought the estate from the investment company and began to convert it into a park. Donations from Ethel Queeny and Edward Greensfelder went toward landscaping, a family recreational area, and a recreation complex, the Greensfelder Recreation Complex, which opened in 1974.

In 1987, the American Kennel Club opened its Museum of the Dog in the Jarville House; the museum would return to New York in 2018.

In December 2019, the St. Louis County Council voted to allow deer hunts at all St. Louis County Parks, including Queeny.

== See also ==
- Parks in Greater St. Louis
