= Bethel House =

Historic house in Arkansas, United States

- U.S. National Register of Historic Places
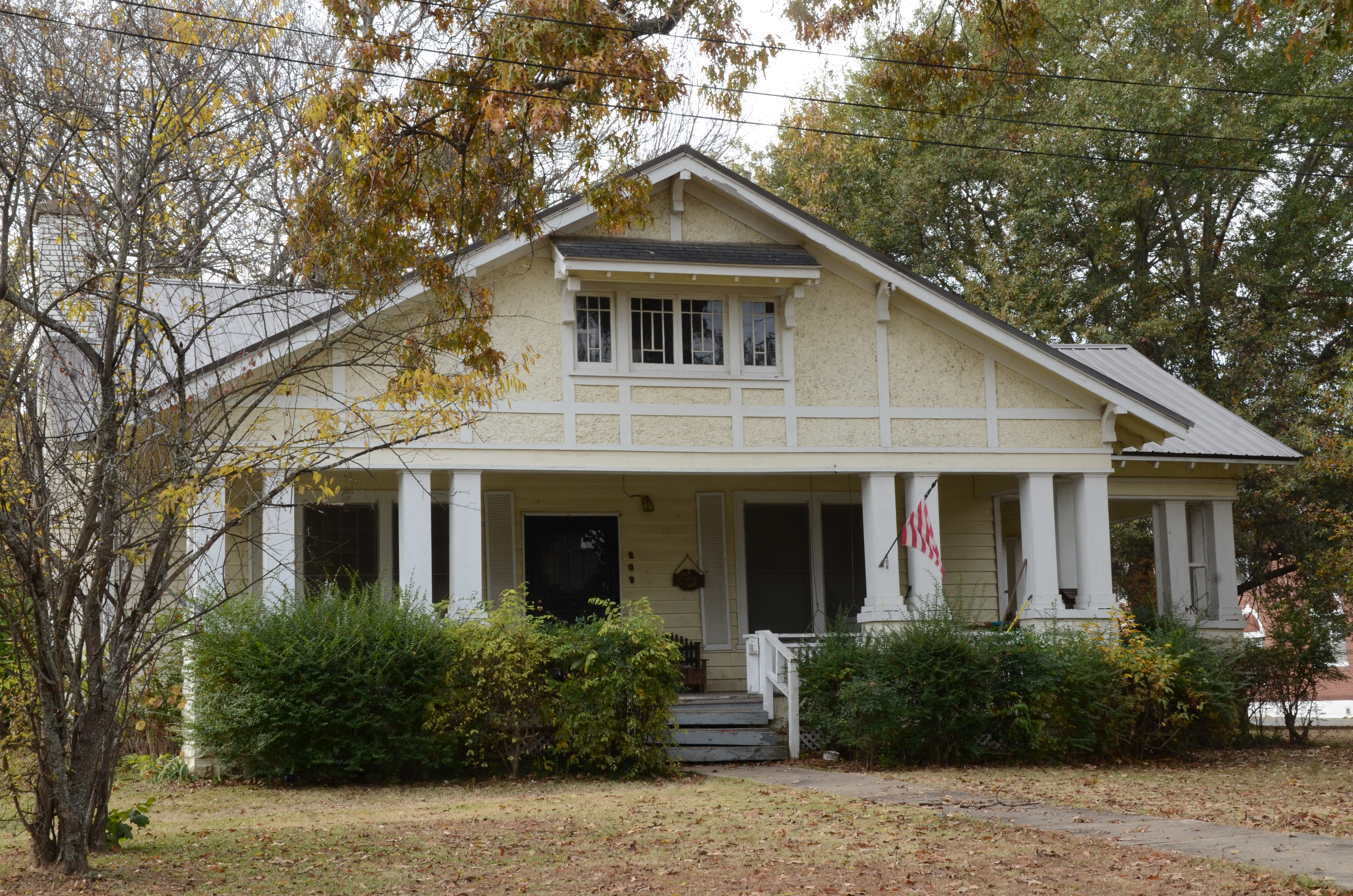

- Location within Arkansas Location within the United States
- Location: Erwin and 2nd Sts., Des Arc, Arkansas
- Coordinates: 34°58′32″N 91°29′40″W
- Area: less than one acre
- Built: 1918
- Architect: Charles L. Thompson
- Architectural style: Bungalow/Craftsman
- MPS: Thompson, Charles L., Design Collection TR
- NRHP reference No.: 82000872
- Added to NRHP: December 22, 1982

The Bethel House is a historic house at Erwin and 2nd Streets in Des Arc, Arkansas. It is a 1 1/2-story wood-frame structure, with a side-gable roof and weatherboard siding. The front of the house is dominated by a broad cross gable, beneath which is a recessed porch, supported by groups of columns set on fieldstone piers. The house was designed by Charles L. Thompson and built in 1918; it is a fine example of the small-scale residential architecture Thompson produced.

The house was listed on the National Register of Historic Places in 1982.

== See also ==
- National Register of Historic Places listings in Prairie County, Arkansas
