= Wingmead =

Historic house in Arkansas, United States

- U.S. National Register of Historic Places
- Location within Arkansas Location within the United States
- Location: West side of AR 33, 0.5 mile south of Eason Rd., Roe, Arkansas
- Coordinates: 34°39′33″N 91°27′23″W
- Area: 5,492 acres (2,223 ha)
- Built: 1939
- Architectural style: Colonial Revival
- NRHP reference No.: 11000302
- Added to NRHP: May 23, 2011

Wingmead is a large farm and country estate in eastern Prairie County, Arkansas. Encompassing about 14,000 acres (5,700 ha) in all, it is one Arkansas's largest private estates, developed by Edgar Monsanto Queeny, a president of Monsanto Corporation. Its main house, built about 1939, is one of the state's grandest examples of Colonial Revival architecture. The estate includes several features related to nature conservation and hunting, particularly Peckerwood Lake, a 4,000-acre (1,600 ha) lake created by Queeny to promote duck habitat.

The property was listed on the National Register of Historic Places in 2011.

== See also ==
- National Register of Historic Places listings in Prairie County, Arkansas
