= First Presbyterian Church (Des Arc, Arkansas) =

Historic church in Arkansas, United States

- U.S. National Register of Historic Places
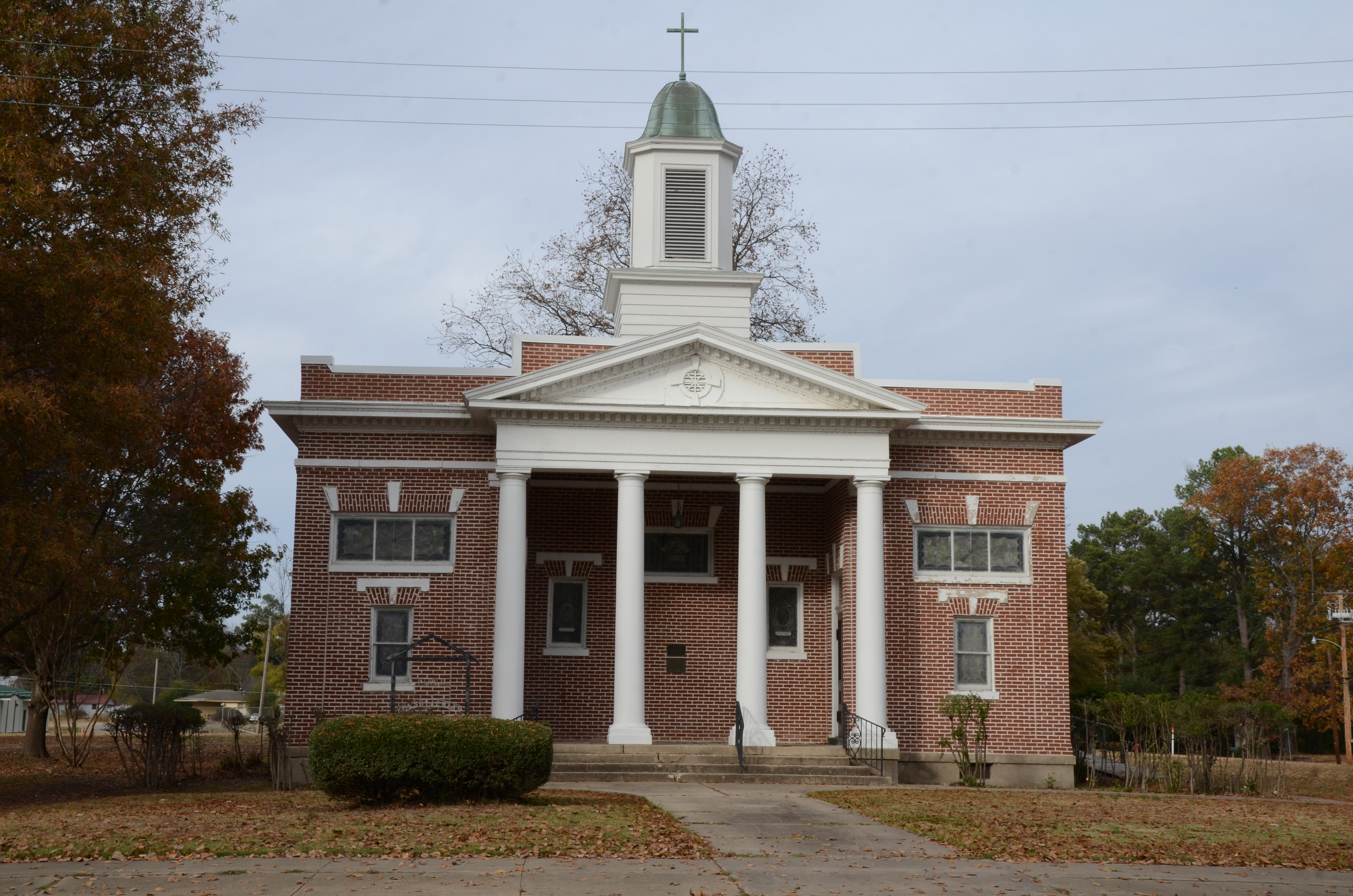

- Location within Arkansas Location within the United States
- Location: Jct. of Main and 5th Sts., Des Arc, Arkansas
- Coordinates: 34°58′38″N 91°29′52″W
- Area: less than one acre
- Architect: J.D. Keedy
- Architectural style: Colonial Revival, Vernacular Colonial Revival
- NRHP reference No.: 90000897
- Added to NRHP: June 14, 1990

The First Presbyterian Church is a historic church in Des Arc, Arkansas, United States. It is a single-story brick building, built in 1913 in a vernacular interpretation of the Colonial Revival style. Its front facade has a neoclassical gabled portico with four supporting columns and entablature, and it has a two-stage belfry set atop its flat roof, with a bell-shaped copper roof. The congregation was founded in the 1840s; this is its third building.

The building was listed on the National Register of Historic Places in 1990.

In 2010 the congregation closed and donated the building to the city for use as a main branch library for Prairie and Arkansas counties.

== See also ==
- National Register of Historic Places listings in Prairie County, Arkansas
