= St. Elizabeth's Catholic Church (De Valls Bluff, Arkansas) =

Historic church in Arkansas, United States

- U.S. National Register of Historic Places
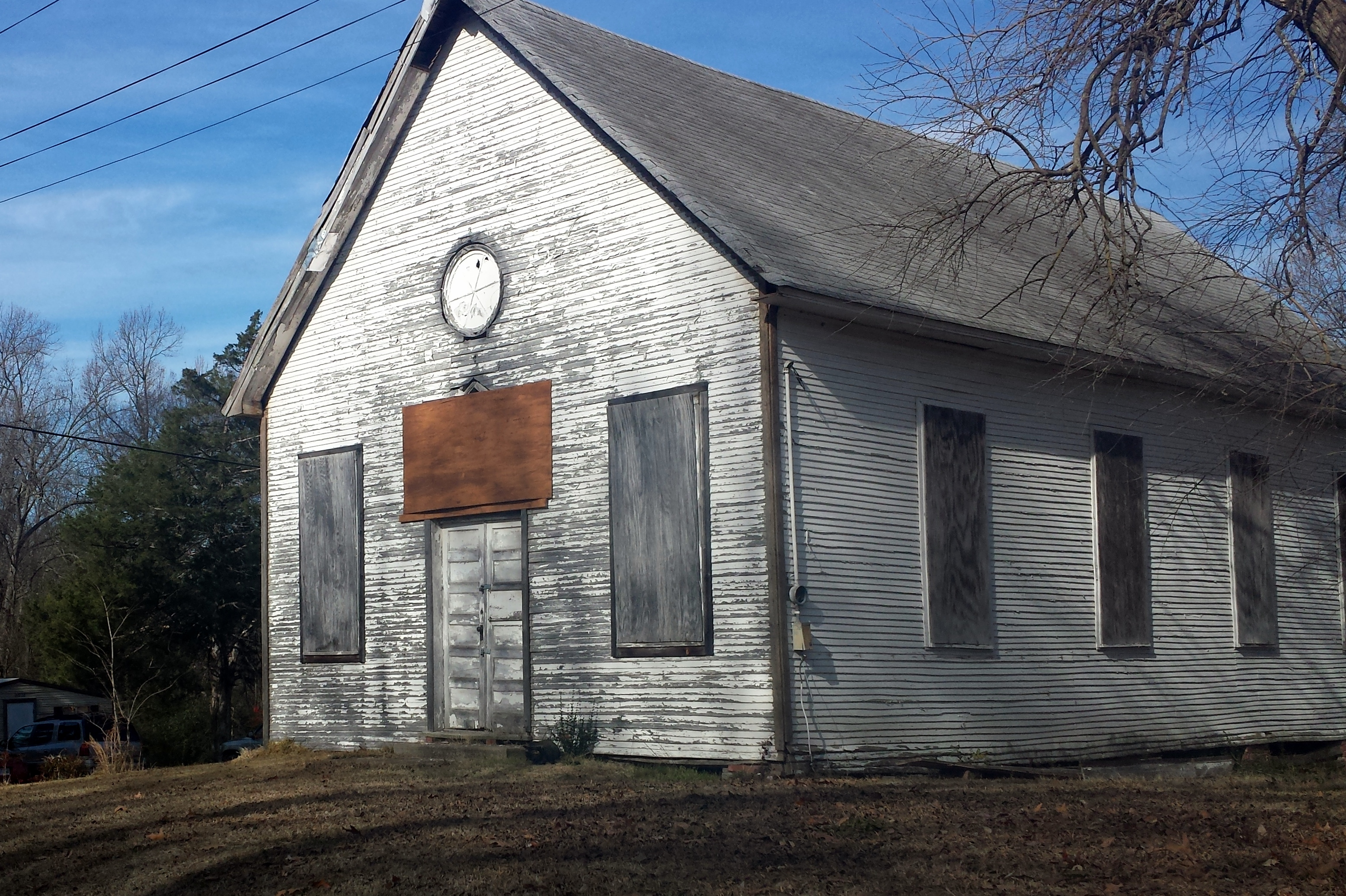

- Location within Arkansas Location within the United States
- Location: NE corner of Sycamore and Mason Sts., DeValls Bluff, Arkansas
- Coordinates: 34°47′1″N 91°27′34″W
- Area: less than one acre
- Built: 1912
- NRHP reference No.: 09000744
- Added to NRHP: September 23, 2009

St. Elizabeth's Catholic Church is a historic church at the northeast corner of Sycamore and Mason Streets in DeValls Bluff, Arkansas in the United States. It was built in 1912 and added to the National Register of Historic Places in 2009.

== History ==
Catholic priests began serving the area around DeValls Bluff in the 1870s, and St. Elizabeth's was canonically established as a parish of the Diocese of Little Rock in 1904. As large Catholic immigrant communities settled in the area in the early 20th century, mostly German and Austrian farmers, the parish outgrew its first church and had the present structure built in 1912. The small parish was closed in 1986 after the death of the last parishioner, and the church was abandoned.

In 1992, local resident Mary Sharp purchased the property from the diocese, having a personal interest in the church and in the history of the region, though not a parishioner or Catholic herself. She worked for two years to get the church listed on the Arkansas Register of Historic Places, and later on the National Register.

The building suffered wind and water damage in 2011 storms, and has been listed among Arkansas' most "endangered" historic places by the Historic Preservation Alliance of Arkansas.
