= Meyer Brothers Drug Company =

Former American pharmaceutical company that operated 1852-1981

- Type: Private company
- Industry: Pharmaceuticals
- Founded: 1852 in Fort Wayne, Indiana
- Founder: Christian F. G. Meyer
- Defunct: July 1981
- Fate: Acquired
- Successor: Fox Meyer Health Corporation
- Headquarters: St. Louis, United States
- Area served: United States and Western world
- Key people: Carl F. G. Meyer III (President from 1935)
- Products: Pharmaceuticals distribution
- Owner: Meyer family

The Meyer Brothers Drug Company was a major American wholesale drug house that operated from 1852 until 1981. It was owned and operated by the Meyer family and was headquartered in St. Louis.

== History ==
The company was founded by Christian F. G. Meyer at Fort Wayne, Indiana, in 1852, beginning with Meyer as the owner and only salesman, working his trade on horseback. Meyer had come to the United States from Hanover, Germany in 1847. In 1857, Meyer's brother John F. W. Meyer became a full partner in the business. By 1865, the business had grown and branched out to other cities; the firm abandoned retail sales for wholesale and moved its headquarters to St. Louis on the supposition that the city was destined to be one of the greatest distributing markets in America. In 1865 Meyer purchased the M. Matthews and Sons drug firm, located on the corner of Second and Locust Streets (now part of the Gateway Arch grounds). It was not until 1889 that the business was incorporated under the "Meyer Brothers Drug Company" name.

Founder Christian died on July 12, 1905, while on a visit to Germany. Christian's son, Carl F. G. Meyer, inherited leadership of the firm. By 1935, Carl F. G. Meyer III was a director and executive at the firm, while his grandfather remained the company's head. By 1955, C. F. G. Meyer III had advanced to become president of the company.

By the early part of the 20th century, Meyer Brothers was the "largest independent wholesale drug company" in the United States, and also a major exporter of these commodities to other countries in the Western Hemisphere. It was bought out by Fox Meyer Health Corporation in July 1981.

Founder Christian Meyer had an interest in the history of drug making and, as a hobby, amassed a collection of mortars and pestles, show globes and other historical tools of the trade that were displayed in the company's "directors' room" as of 1935.
