= Prairie County Courthouse (Des Arc, Arkansas) =

- U.S. National Register of Historic Places
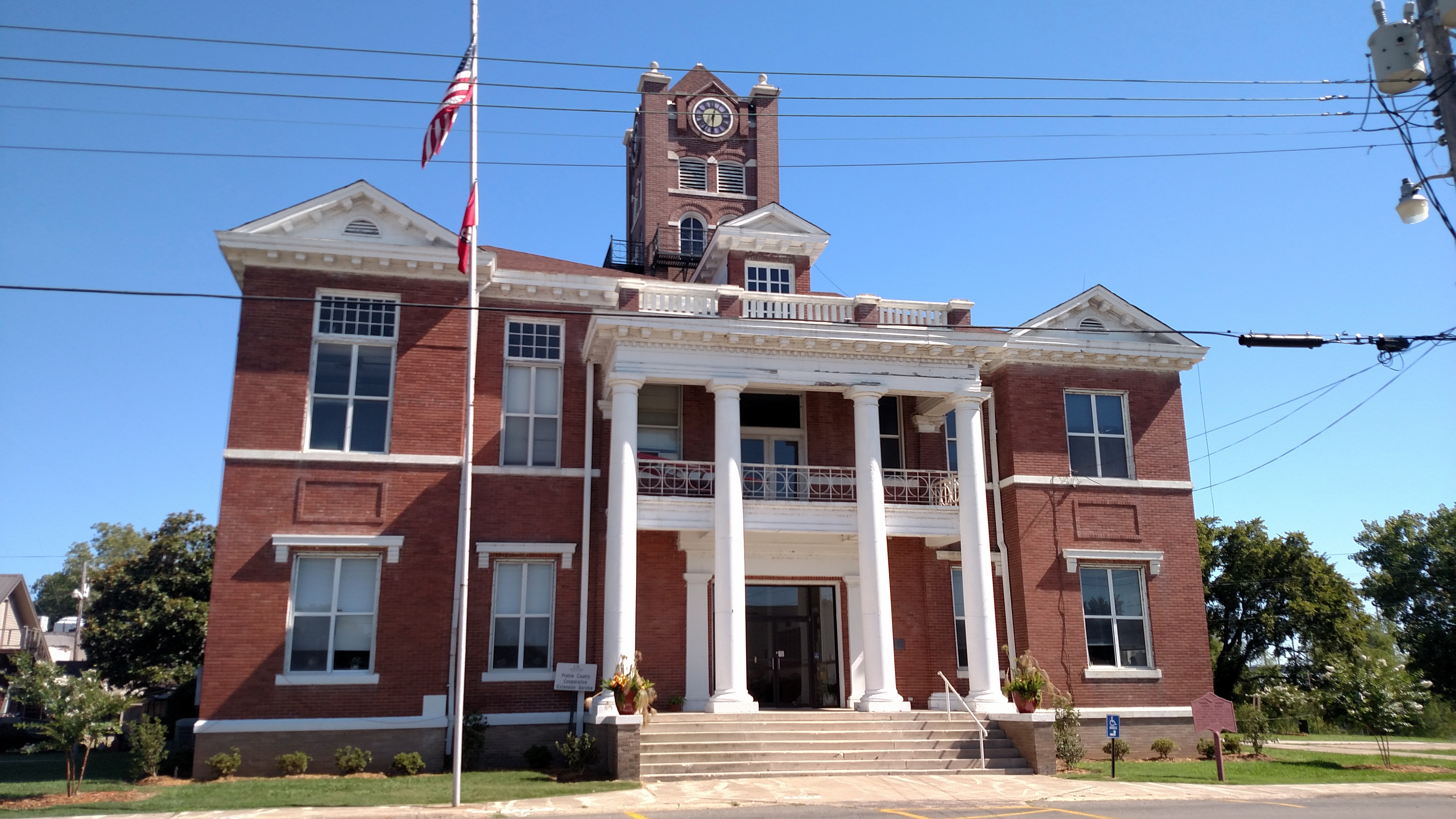

- Location within Arkansas Location within the United States
- Interactive map showing the location of Prairie County Courthouse, Des Arc
- Location: Main St., Des Arc, Arkansas
- Coordinates: 34°58′39″N 91°29′39″W
- Built: 1913
- Architect: Morrison, R.P.
- Architectural style: Colonial Revival, Renaissance
- NRHP reference No.: 77000266
- Added to NRHP: April 18, 1977

The Prairie County Courthouse of Des Arc, Arkansas, is one of two county courthouses in Prairie County, Arkansas. Des Arc is one of two county seats, and De Valls Bluff, the other, also has a courthouse. The one in Des Arc is located downtown, at Court Square and 2nd Streets. It is a handsome two-story brick building with Georgian and Italian Revival features, designed and built in 1913, following the destruction of the city's second county courthouse by fire. It was designed by R.P. Morrison and cost $27,500.

The building was listed on the National Register of Historic Places in 1977.

== Gallery ==
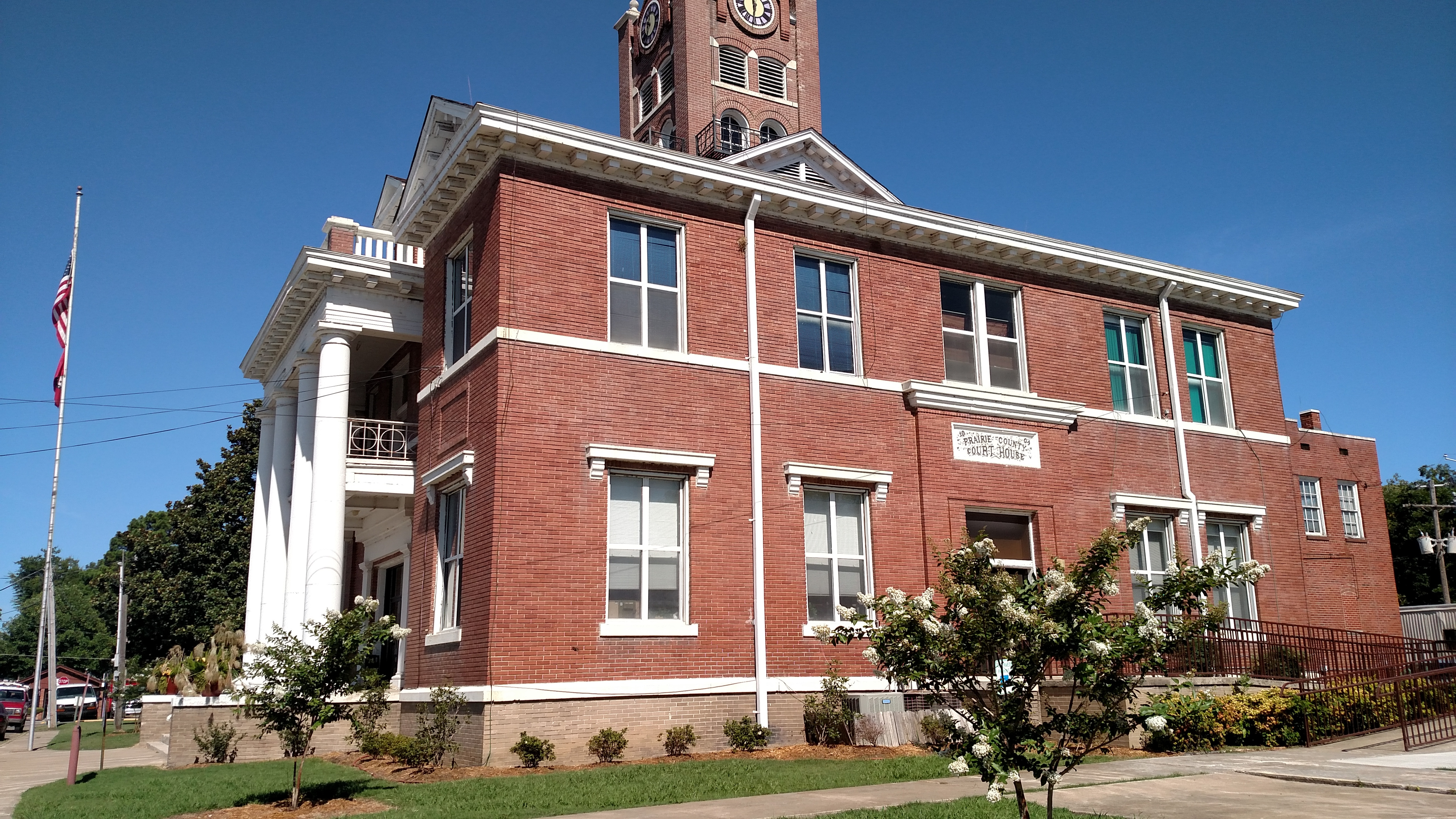
Side of courthouse

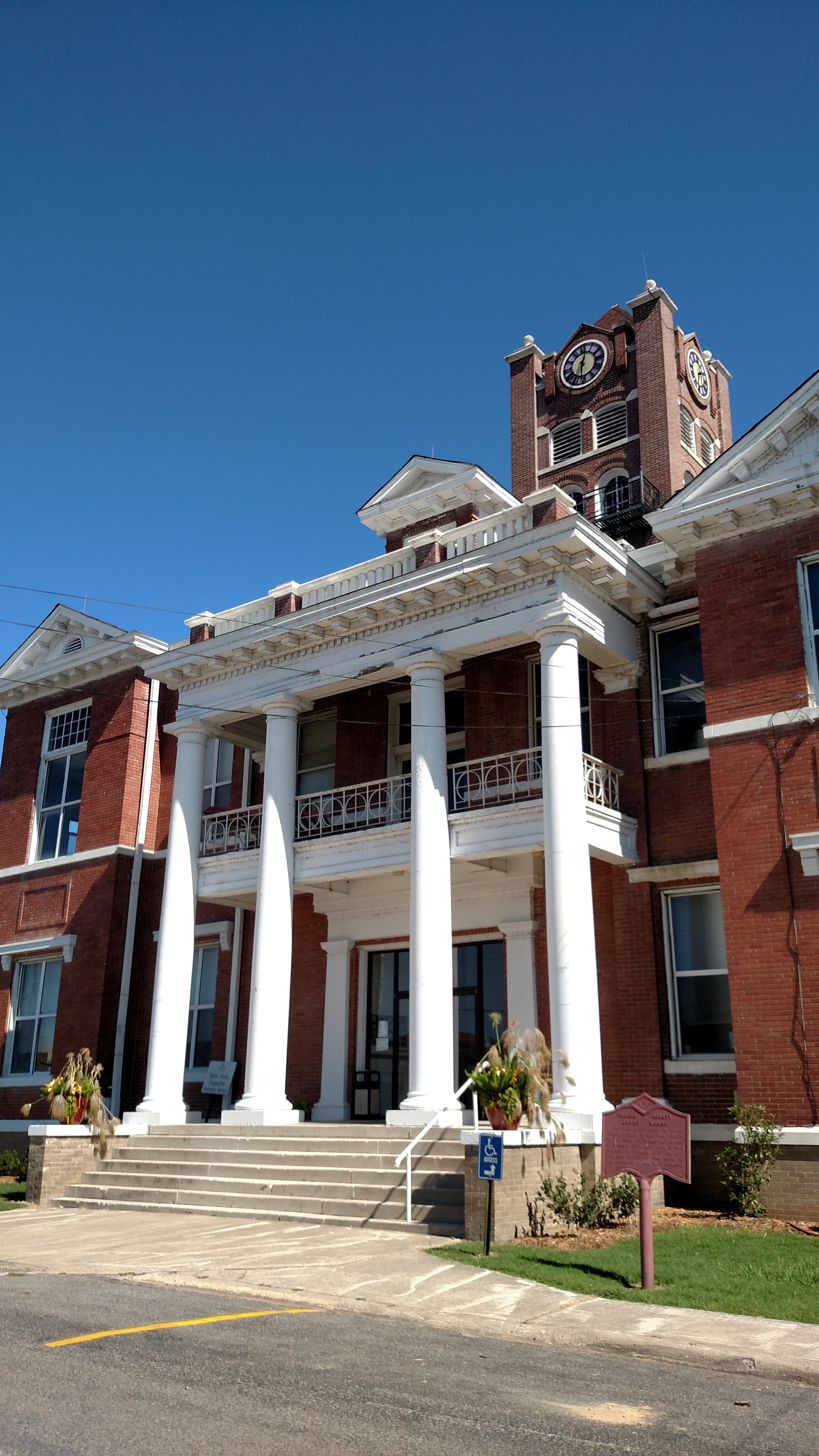
Front view

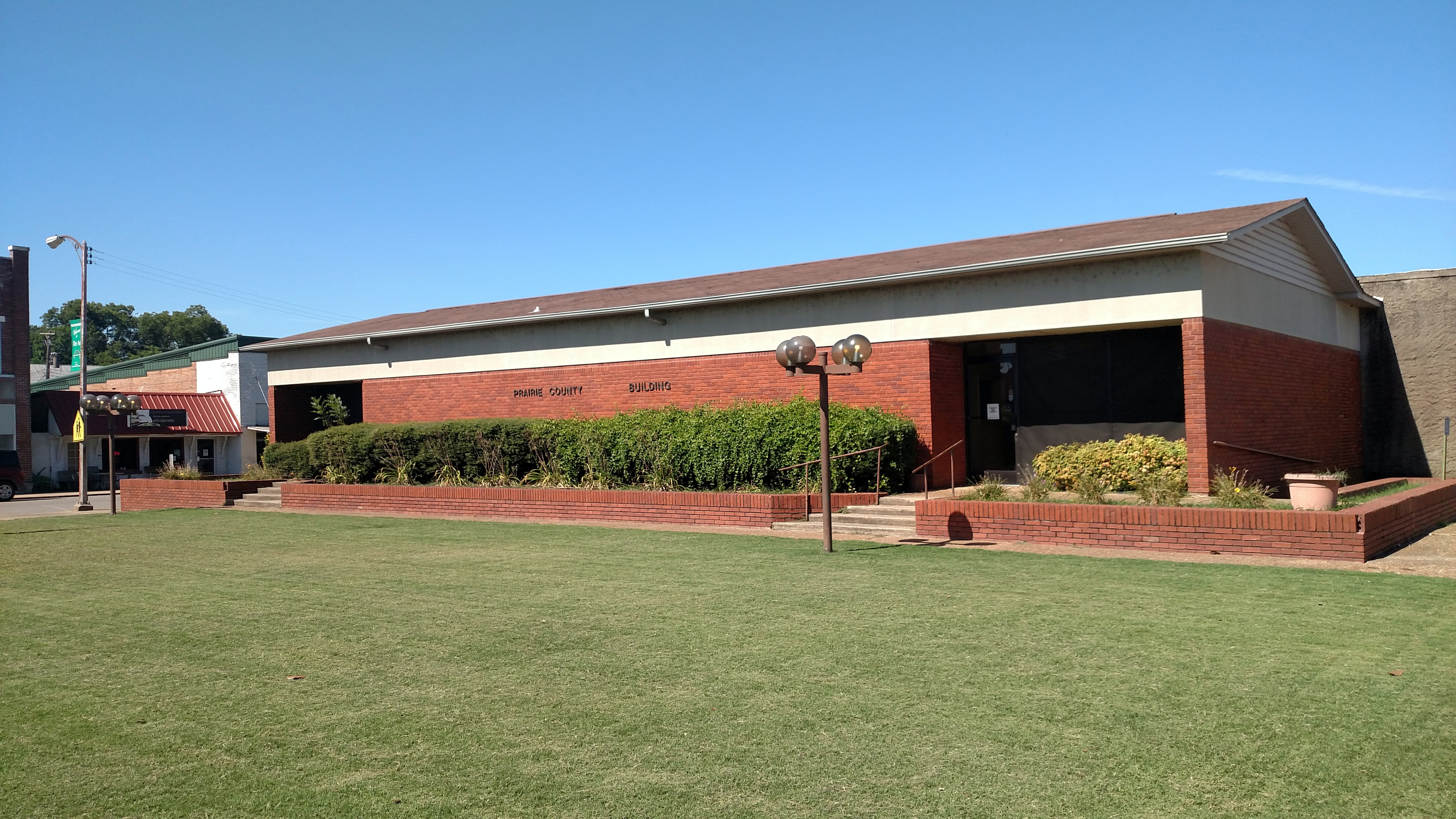
Courthouse annex (across Main Street)

== See also ==
- National Register of Historic Places listings in Prairie County, Arkansas
