= Des Arc, Arkansas =

- City
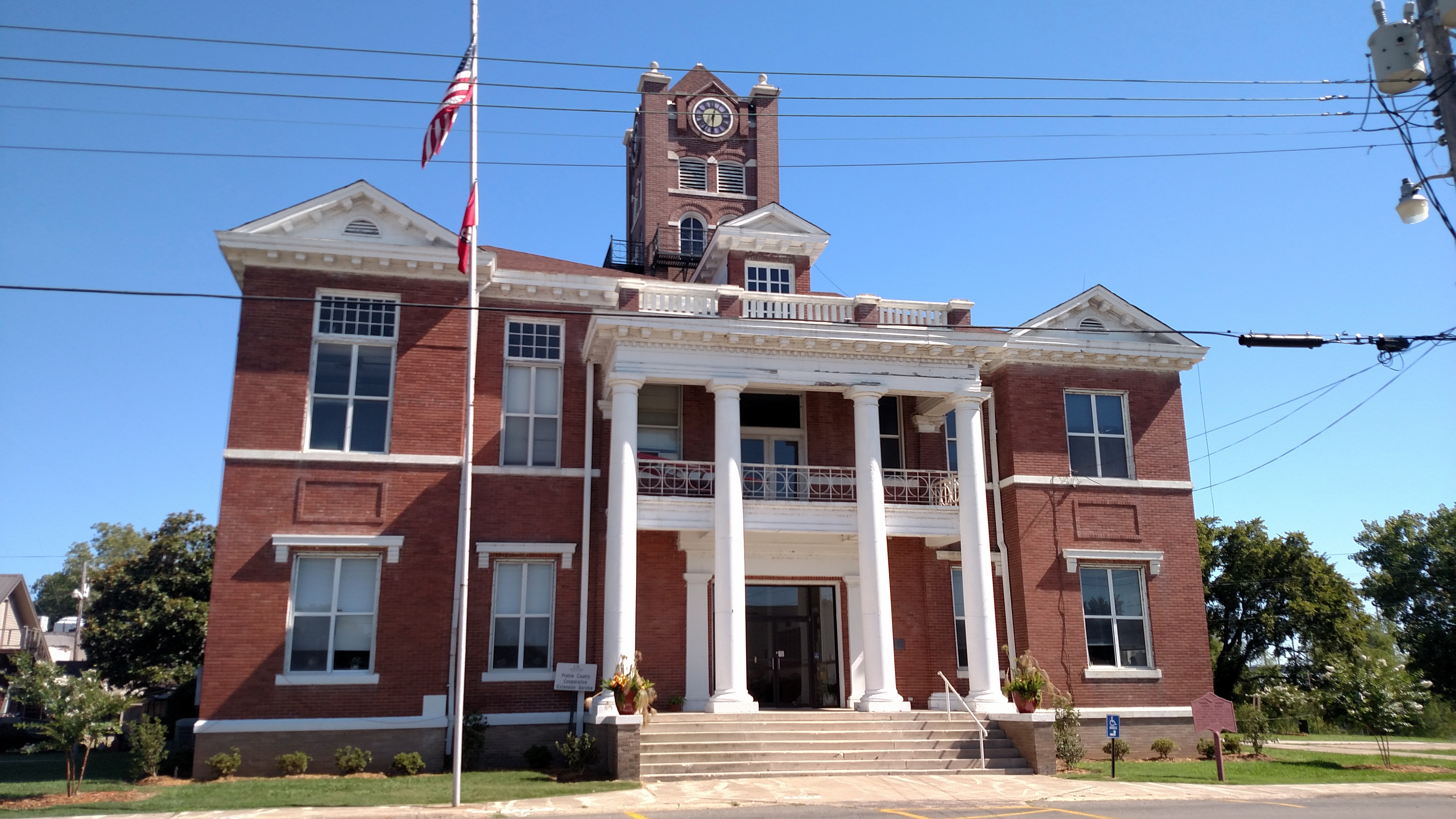
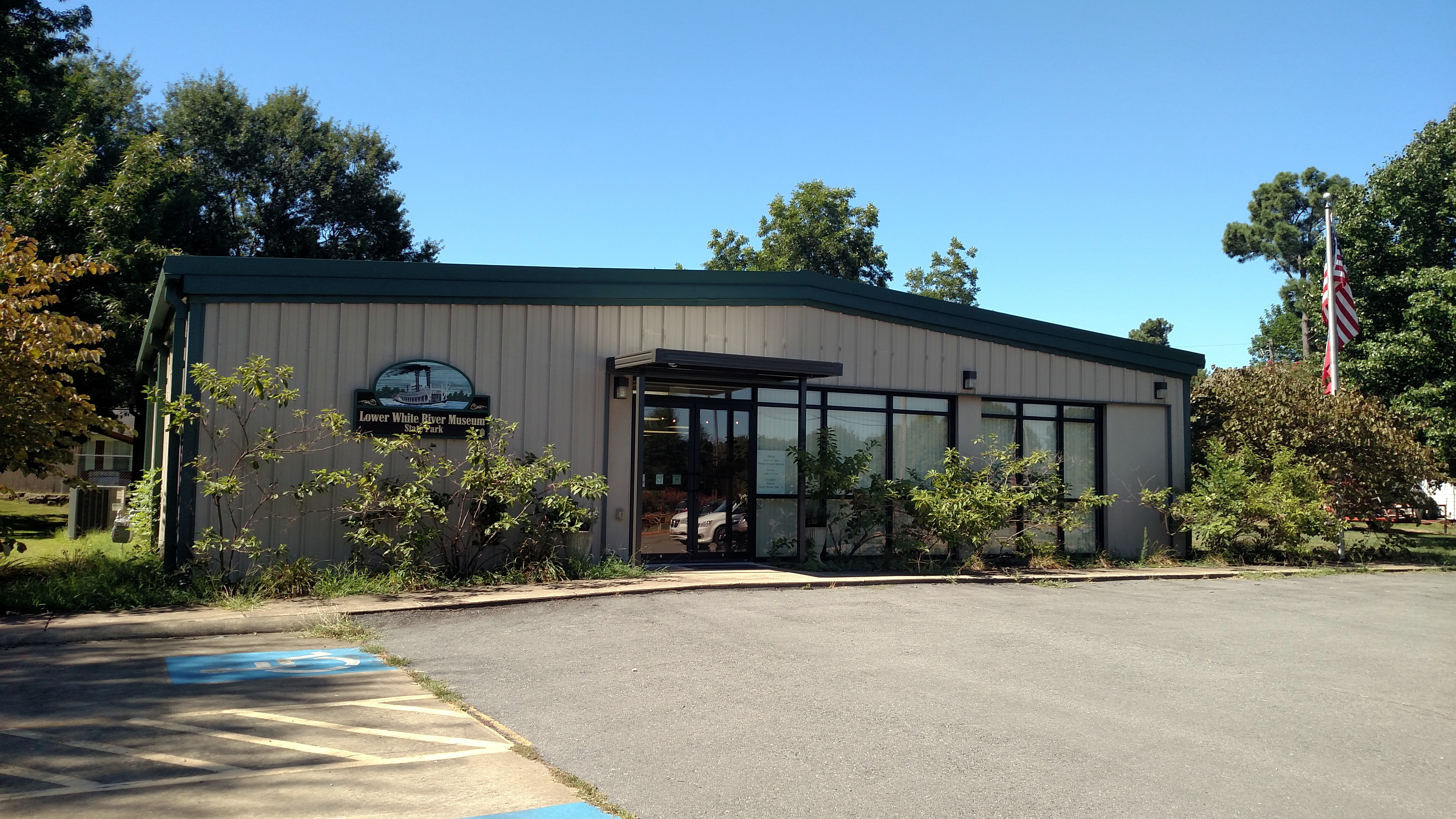
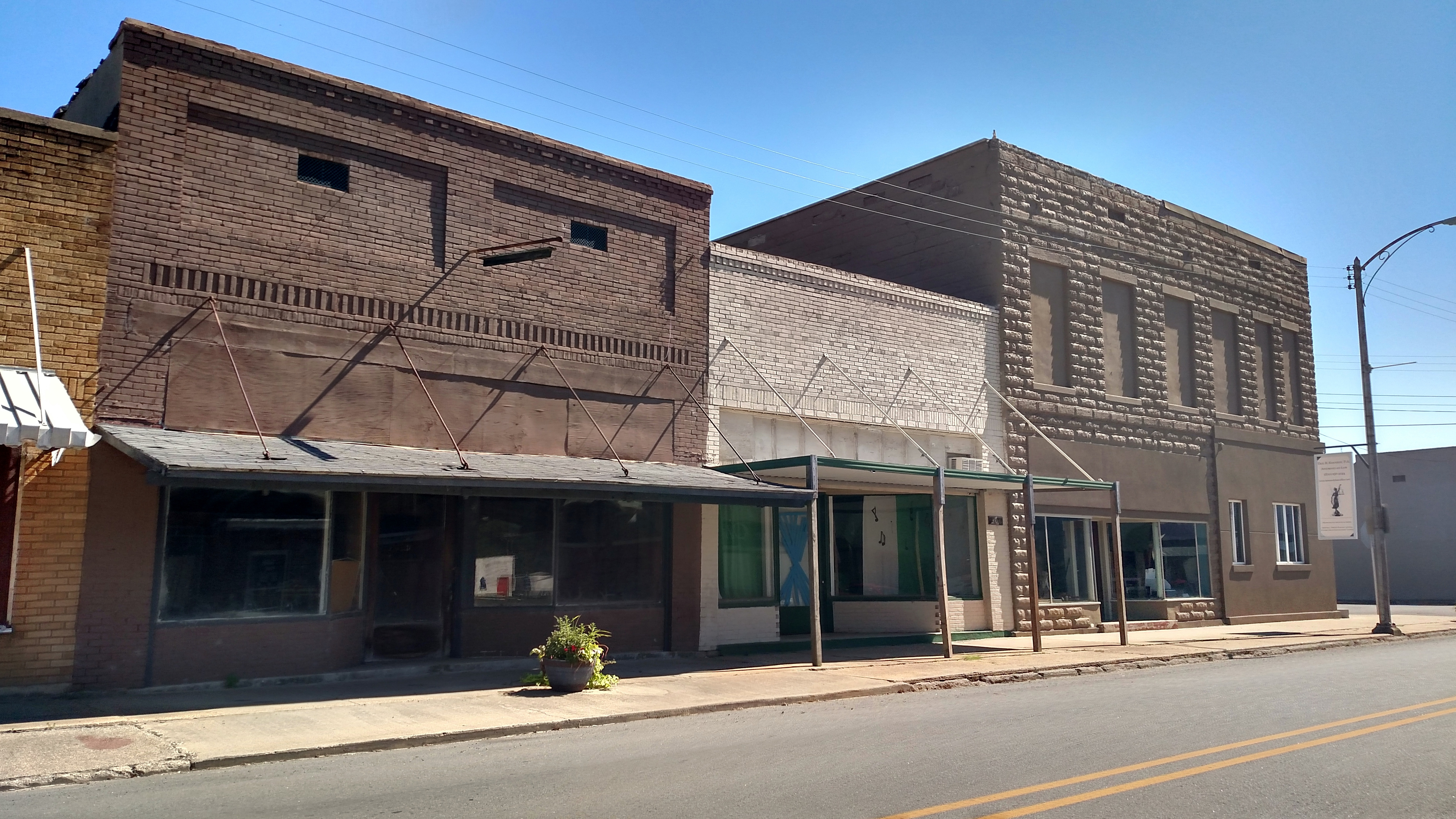
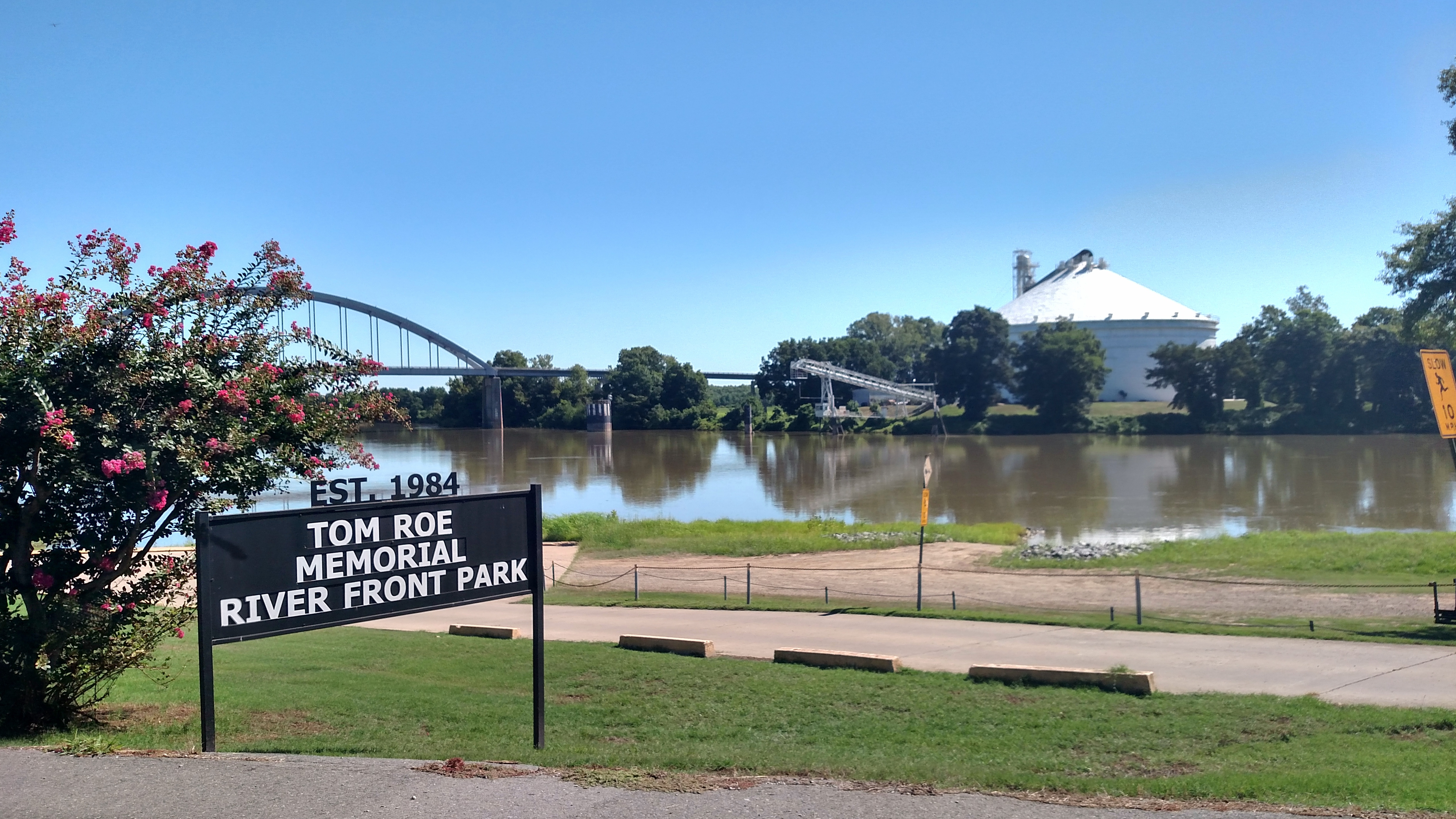
- Clockwise from top: Prairie County Courthouse, Northern District, Downtown Des Arc, the White River, city park and bridge, and the Lower White River State Park

- Location of Des Arc in Prairie County, Arkansas.
- Coordinates: 34°58′32″N 91°30′02″W
- Country: United States
- State: Arkansas
- County: Prairie
- Incorporated: 1854
- Named for: "At the bend" in French

Government
  - Type: Mayor–Council
  - Mayor: James Garth

Area
  - Total: 2.11 sq mi (5.46 km^{2})
  - Land: 2.10 sq mi (5.45 km^{2})
  - Water: 0.0077 sq mi (0.02 km^{2})
- Elevation: 207 ft (63 m)

Population (2020)
  - Total: 1,905
  - Estimate (2025): 1,841 ▼
  - Density: 906.1/sq mi (349.83/km^{2})
- Time zone: UTC−06:00 (Central (CST))
  - Summer (DST): UTC−05:00 (CDT)
- ZIP Code: 72040
- Area code: 870
- FIPS code: 05-18550
- GNIS feature ID: 2404222
- Website: www.cityofdesarc.com

Des Arc (/ˈdɛz.ɑːrk/ DEZ-ark) is a city on the White River in the Arkansas Delta, United States. It is the largest city in Prairie County, Arkansas, and the county seat for the county's northern district. Incorporated in 1854, Des Arc's position on the river has shaped its culture, history, and economy, beginning as a major lumber shipping port but leaving the city vulnerable to major floods in 1927 and 1937. As river shipping declined, Des Arc was bypassed by railroads, Interstate highways, and much of the post-industrial society. Des Arc's history is preserved by seven listings on the National Register of Historic Places, and the region's history is interpreted at Lower White River Museum State Park. The city's population stopped growing in the 1980s and has been declining since, with a population of 1,905 at the 2020 census.

== History ==
White settlement in the area began in the Lower White River Valley while the area was within French Louisiana, which lasted from 1686-1763. French from Canada and South Louisiana passed through the area while hunting and trapping bears and other animals. They shipped furs and bear oil downriver to Arkansas Post, which was the only established settlement in the region, then likely onto New Orleans. During this period, several places were named by the French, including Des Arc and other places in Prairie County such as La Grue.

Des Arc was founded in 1854. A map shows the original town included 80 residential blocks, and two blocks for a commercial district. The gridded street pattern has never been fully developed, though most of the streets and blocks match the 1854 plan. The gridded east-west street pattern began with a street named McNulty Street in the north, near where present-day Highway 38 is located along the northern edge of the city. The southernmost east-west street was Barrier Street. The town ran from Foster Street (present-day First Street) on the eastern side, to present-day Eighth Street.

== Geography ==
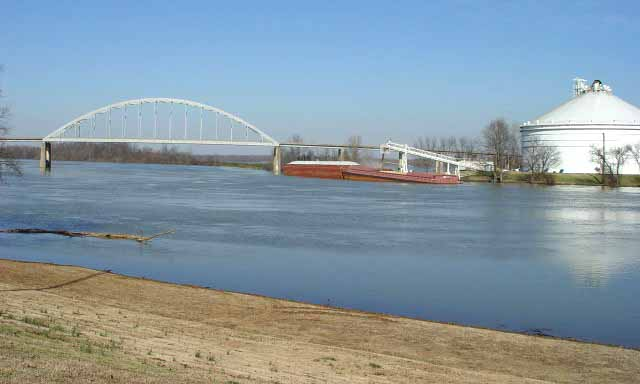
The White River at Des Arc, Arkansas

Des Arc is located in the Lower White River segment of the Arkansas Delta (in Arkansas, usually referred to as "the Delta"). The Arkansas Delta is a subregion of the Mississippi Alluvial Plain, which is a flat area consisting of rich, fertile sediment deposits from the Mississippi River between Louisiana and Illinois. The White River Lowlands contain swamps and forests, in contrast to southern portions of Prairie County within the Grand Prairie, a subdivision of the Arkansas Delta known today for rice farming and aquaculture.

According to the United States Census Bureau, the city has a total area of 2.0 square miles (5.2 km^{2}), of which 2.0 square miles (5.2 km^{2}) is land and 0.49% is water. Des Arc is located approximately 60 miles (97 km) east of Little Rock and 95 miles (153 km) west of Memphis, Tennessee. (Note: Mileages based on highway miles.) Within Prairie County, Des Arc is the northernmost city, located 10–15 miles (16–24 km) north of Hazen, DeValls Bluff, and Fredonia (Biscoe).

=== Climate ===
Prairie County has a humid subtropical climate (Köppen Cfa). Prairie County experiences all four seasons, although summers can be extremely hot and humid and winters are mild with little snow. July is the hottest month of the year, with an average high of 92 °F (33.3 °C) and an average low of 73 °F (22.8 °C). Temperatures above 100 °F (38 °C) are not uncommon. January is the coldest month with an average high of 48 °F (8.9 °C) and an average low of 31 °F (−0.6 °C). The highest temperature was 109 °F (42.8 °C), and the lowest temperature recorded was −5 °F (−21 °C). Record snowfall in Des Arc occurred January 7, 1912, with 18 inches (46 cm).

Climate data for Des Arc, Arkansas (1991–2020 normals, extremes 1903–1908, 1940–present)
Month	Jan	Feb	Mar	Apr	May	Jun	Jul	Aug	Sep	Oct	Nov	Dec	Year
Record high °F (°C)	80 (27)	82 (28)	93 (34)	93 (34)	98 (37)	105 (41)	109 (43)	109 (43)	105 (41)	98 (37)	87 (31)	83 (28)	109 (43)
Mean maximum °F (°C)	70.4 (21.3)	73.9 (23.3)	81.6 (27.6)	85.6 (29.8)	90.3 (32.4)	95.0 (35.0)	99.6 (37.6)	100.4 (38.0)	95.4 (35.2)	88.2 (31.2)	78.2 (25.7)	71.1 (21.7)	100.8 (38.2)
Mean daily maximum °F (°C)	48.9 (9.4)	53.9 (12.2)	62.9 (17.2)	72.6 (22.6)	81.0 (27.2)	88.9 (31.6)	92.0 (33.3)	91.4 (33.0)	84.9 (29.4)	74.7 (23.7)	61.7 (16.5)	51.8 (11.0)	72.1 (22.3)
Daily mean °F (°C)	40.8 (4.9)	45.0 (7.2)	53.7 (12.1)	62.9 (17.2)	71.7 (22.1)	79.7 (26.5)	82.7 (28.2)	81.6 (27.6)	74.8 (23.8)	63.6 (17.6)	52.2 (11.2)	43.7 (6.5)	62.7 (17.1)
Mean daily minimum °F (°C)	32.6 (0.3)	36.1 (2.3)	44.4 (6.9)	53.2 (11.8)	62.4 (16.9)	70.6 (21.4)	73.4 (23.0)	71.9 (22.2)	64.6 (18.1)	52.6 (11.4)	42.7 (5.9)	35.6 (2.0)	53.3 (11.8)
Mean minimum °F (°C)	13.9 (−10.1)	18.0 (−7.8)	23.3 (−4.8)	32.2 (0.1)	43.0 (6.1)	56.6 (13.7)	61.8 (16.6)	59.4 (15.2)	46.4 (8.0)	33.0 (0.6)	23.3 (−4.8)	17.3 (−8.2)	13.5 (−10.3)
Record low °F (°C)	−8 (−22)	−4 (−20)	10 (−12)	28 (−2)	37 (3)	46 (8)	53 (12)	48 (9)	32 (0)	23 (−5)	13 (−11)	−2 (−19)	−8 (−22)
Average precipitation inches (mm)	3.68 (93)	4.04 (103)	5.16 (131)	5.53 (140)	5.40 (137)	3.01 (76)	3.10 (79)	2.89 (73)	3.32 (84)	4.23 (107)	4.43 (113)	5.25 (133)	50.04 (1,271)
Average snowfall inches (cm)	0.6 (1.5)	0.8 (2.0)	0.7 (1.8)	0.0 (0.0)	0.0 (0.0)	0.0 (0.0)	0.0 (0.0)	0.0 (0.0)	0.0 (0.0)	0.0 (0.0)	0.1 (0.25)	0.1 (0.25)	2.3 (5.8)
Average precipitation days (≥ 0.01 in)	8.7	8.7	9.8	9.4	9.9	7.0	6.8	6.3	5.9	7.1	8.2	9.2	97.0
Average snowy days (≥ 0.1 in)	0.4	0.6	0.2	0.0	0.0	0.0	0.0	0.0	0.0	0.0	0.1	0.1	1.4
Source: NOAA

== Demographics ==
Historical population
Census	Pop.	Note	%±
1880	548		—
1890	546		−0.4%
1900	640		17.2%
1910	1,061		65.8%
1920	1,307		23.2%
1930	1,348		3.1%
1940	1,410		4.6%
1950	1,612		14.3%
1960	1,482		−8.1%
1970	1,714		15.7%
1980	2,001		16.7%
1990	2,001		0.0%
2000	1,933		−3.4%
2010	1,717		−11.2%
2020	1,905		10.9%
2025 (est.)	1,841	▼	−3.4%
U.S. Decennial Census; 2014 Estimate

=== 2020 census ===
As of the 2020 census, Des Arc had a population of 1,905. The median age was 39.6 years. 23.9% of residents were under the age of 18 and 20.3% of residents were 65 years of age or older. For every 100 females there were 100.3 males, and for every 100 females age 18 and over there were 90.4 males age 18 and over.

0.0% of residents lived in urban areas, while 100.0% lived in rural areas.

There were 767 households in Des Arc, of which 27.6% had children under the age of 18 living in them. Of all households, 37.9% were married-couple households, 21.3% were households with a male householder and no spouse or partner present, and 35.6% were households with a female householder and no spouse or partner present. About 33.7% of all households were made up of individuals and 15.1% had someone living alone who was 65 years of age or older.

There were 849 housing units, of which 9.7% were vacant. The homeowner vacancy rate was 1.5% and the rental vacancy rate was 6.5%.

Des Arc racial composition
Race	Number	Percentage
White (non-Hispanic)	1,547	81.21%
Black or African American (non-Hispanic)	261	13.7%
Native American	3	0.16%
Asian	3	0.16%
Other/Mixed	66	3.46%
Hispanic or Latino	25	1.31%

=== 2000 census ===
As of the census of 2000, there were 1,933 people, 783 households, and 534 families residing in the city. The population density was 948.0 inhabitants per square mile (366.0/km^{2}). There were 850 housing units at an average density of 416.9 per square mile (161.0/km^{2}). The racial makeup of the city was 83.03% White, 14.80% Black or African American, 1.30% Native American, 0.31% Asian, 0.62% from other races, and 0.93% from two or more races. 1.29% of the population were Hispanic or Latino of any race.

There were 783 households, out of which 30.0% had children under the age of 18 living with them, 48.3% were married couples living together, 16.6% had a female householder with no husband present, and 31.7% were non-families. 29.4% of all households were made up of individuals, and 15.8% had someone living alone who was 65 years of age or older. The average household size was 2.38 and the average family size was 2.93.

In the city, the population was spread out, with 24.6% under the age of 18, 7.4% from 18 to 24, 25.7% from 25 to 44, 23.0% from 45 to 64, and 19.2% who were 65 years of age or older. The median age was 40 years. For every 100 females, there were 89.0 males. For every 100 females age 18 and over, there were 83.5 males.

The median income for a household in the city was $23,750, and the median income for a family was $28,264. Males had a median income of $26,250 versus $17,500 for females. The per capita income for the city was $14,629. About 16.3% of families and 20.0% of the population were below the poverty line, including 32.2% of those under age 18 and 12.9% of those age 65 or over.

== Economy ==
The city is home to White River Energetics' factory manufacturing primers for small arms ammunition. The factory is being expanded to manufacture single-base smokeless powder. It will be the first single-base smokeless propellant factory built in the United States in a half-century. In 2024 it was announced that production is intended to begin in 2026.

== Culture and contemporary life ==
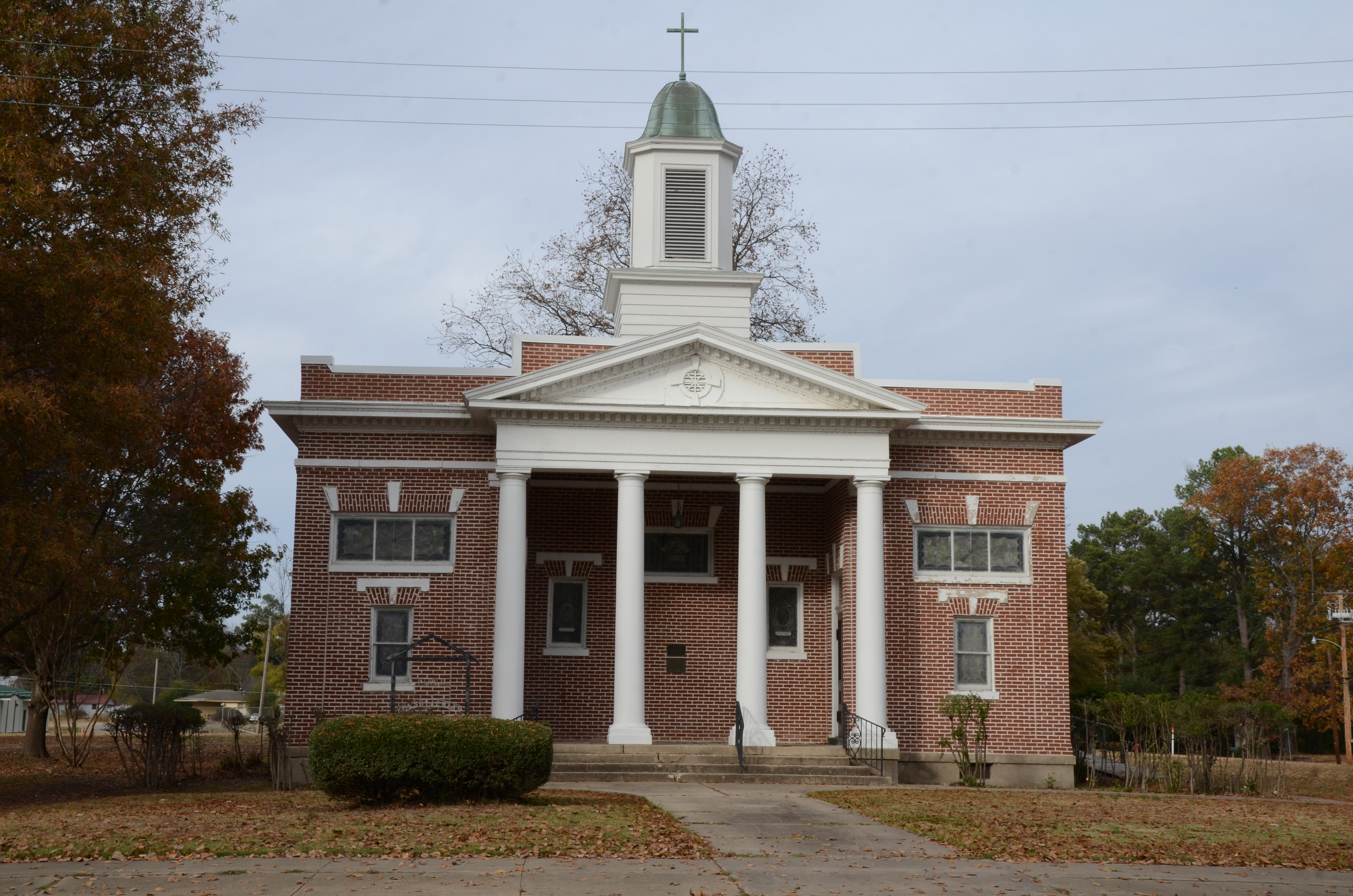
The First Presbyterian Church is listed on the NRHP

Des Arc has seven properties listed on the National Register of Historic Places, including Bethel House, at Erwin and 2nd Streets, designed by architect Charles L. Thompson.

== Government ==
Des Arc operates within the mayor-city council form of government. The mayor is elected by a citywide election to serve as the Chief Executive Officer (CEO) of the city by presiding over all city functions, policies, rules and laws. Once elected, the mayor also allocates duties to city employees. Mayors serve four-year terms and can serve unlimited terms. The city council is the unicameral legislative of the City, consisting of six aldermen. Also included in the council's duties is balancing the city's budget and passing ordinances.

== Human resources ==
=== Education ===
Des Arc is served by the Des Arc School District.

- Des Arc Pre-K
- Des Arc Elementary School K-6
- Des Arc High School 7-12

=== Public safety ===
The city is served by the Des Arc Police Department and the Des Arc Fire Department.

The city is under the jurisdiction of the 23rd District Court, a state district court. State district courts in Arkansas are courts of original jurisdiction for criminal, civil (up to $25,000), small claims, and traffic matters. State district courts are presided over by a full-time District Judge elected to a four-year term by a districtwide election.

Superseding district court jurisdiction is the 17th Judicial Circuit Court, which covers Prairie and White counties. The 17th Circuit contains three circuit judges, elected to six-year terms circuitwide. Circuit court is held in Searcy. The circuit also contains a drug court.
