= Des Arc School District =

School district in Arkansas, United States

Address
- 600 Main Street Des Arc, Arkansas, 72040; United States

District information
- Type: Public
- Grades: PreK–12
- NCES District ID: 0505190

Students and staff
- Students: 572
- Teachers: 46.1 (FTE)
- Staff: 45.97 (FTE)
- Student–teacher ratio: 12.41

Other information
- Website: www.desarcschools.org

The Des Arc School District is a school district headquartered in Des Arc, Arkansas, United States. The district provides early childhood, elementary and secondary education from pre-kindergarten through to grade 12 in that serves the northern portion of Prairie County. The district encompasses 265.68 square miles (688.1 km^{2}) of land, including all of Des Arc. A small portion of the district extends into Lonoke County.

== Schools ==
The district operates three schools:

- Des Arc High School, serving more than 300 students in grades 7 through 12.
- Des Arc Elementary School, serving more than 300 students in kindergarten through grade 6.
- Des Arc Pre-K School, serving pre-kindergarten.

== Senior staff ==
- Des Arc School District Superintendent: Nick Hill
- Des Arc Elementary School Principal: Dena Rooks
- Des Arc High School Principal: Nick Hill

Des Arc is a member of the Arkansas Activities Association's 6-2A conference. Des Arc participates in Football, Basketball, Baseball, Softball, Track, Cross Country and Wrestling. Des Arc is also home to the Des Arc High School Eagle Marching Band. Des Arc High School also offers many clubs such as FFA, FBLA, Beta Club, National Honor Society, Annual Staff, Eagle Press, FTA, FEA, FCCLA, Student Council, FCA, and more.

Des Arc's mascot is the Eagle

School colors are Green and White.

== Des Arc Alma Mater song ==
The song is arranged to Ode to Joy

Des Arc was the state runner-up in Football in 1975, 2008 and 2013. Des Arc was state champs in 1976. The Des Arc Cross Country Team were state champs in 2007, Sr. Girl Track were state champs of 2008, and Sr. Boy were state Track champs 2009.

Des Arc High School rivals are Hazen High School in Hazen, and Carlisle High School in Carlisle.
