= Hazen, Arkansas =

City in Arkansas, United States

- City
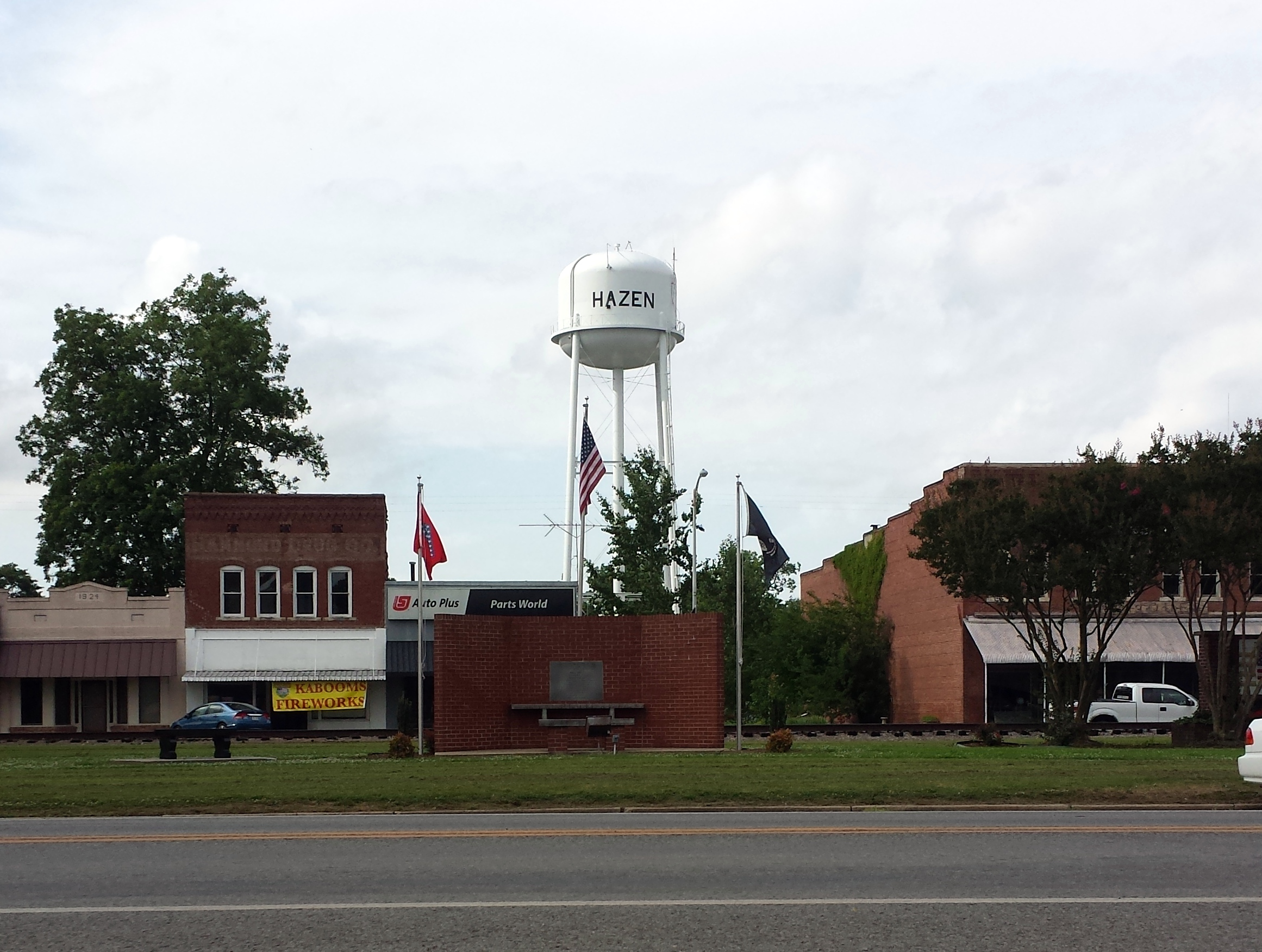
- Downtown Hazen

- Location in Prairie County and Arkansas

- Location in the United States
- Coordinates: 34°48′02″N 91°35′10″W
- Country: United States
- State: Arkansas
- County: Prairie
- Townships: Center, Hazen, Wattensaw
- Founded: March 10, 1873
- Incorporated: July 8, 1884
- Named for: William C. Hazen

Area
  - Total: 3.52 sq mi (9.11 km^{2})
  - Land: 3.52 sq mi (9.11 km^{2})
  - Water: 0 sq mi (0.00 km^{2})
- Elevation: 226 ft (69 m)

Population (2020)
  - Total: 1,481
  - Estimate (2025): 1,374 ▼
  - Density: 421.0/sq mi (162.55/km^{2})
- Time zone: UTC-6 (Central (CST))
  - Summer (DST): UTC-5 (CDT)
- ZIP code: 72064
- Area code: 870
- FIPS code: 05-30940
- GNIS feature ID: 2404669
- Highways: Interstate 40; U.S. Highway 63; U.S. Highway 70
- Major airport: Clinton National Airport (LIT)
- Website: cityofhazenar.gov

Hazen, officially the City of Hazen, is a city in Prairie County, Arkansas, United States. The population was 1,481 at the 2020 census.

== Geography ==
According to the United States Census Bureau, the city has a total area of 3.7 square miles (9.6 km^{2}), all land. Included is a 0.25-mile wide strip of annexed land along Interstate 40, from Prairie County's western border to the White River. Because of this small access to the Interstate this area is known as a speedtrap for motorists. Nearby towns are Des Arc, DeVall's Bluff, Ulm and Fredonia (Biscoe).

== Demographics ==
Historical population
Census	Pop.	Note	%±
1890	458		—
1900	429		−6.3%
1910	687		60.1%
1920	783		14.0%
1930	787		0.5%
1940	819		4.1%
1950	1,270		55.1%
1960	1,456		14.6%
1970	1,605		10.2%
1980	1,636		1.9%
1990	1,668		2.0%
2000	1,637		−1.9%
2010	1,468		−10.3%
2020	1,481		0.9%
2025 (est.)	1,374	▼	−7.2%
U.S. Decennial Census

=== 2020 census ===
Hazen racial composition
Race	Number	Percentage
White (non-Hispanic)	1,121	75.69%
Black or African American (non-Hispanic)	283	19.11%
Native American	4	0.27%
Asian	10	0.68%
Pacific Islander	2	0.14%
Other/Mixed	39	2.63%
Hispanic or Latino	22	1.49%

As of the 2020 census, Hazen had a population of 1,481. There were 397 families residing in the city.

The median age was 46.1 years. 22.7% of residents were under the age of 18 and 23.0% were 65 years of age or older. For every 100 females there were 94.6 males, and for every 100 females age 18 and over there were 90.8 males age 18 and over.

0.0% of residents lived in urban areas, while 100.0% lived in rural areas.

There were 613 households, of which 27.2% had children under the age of 18 living in them. Of all households, 45.7% were married-couple households, 18.1% were households with a male householder and no spouse or partner present, and 32.6% were households with a female householder and no spouse or partner present. About 34.0% of all households were made up of individuals, and 17.5% had someone living alone who was 65 years of age or older.

There were 702 housing units, of which 12.7% were vacant. The homeowner vacancy rate was 3.2% and the rental vacancy rate was 10.4%.

=== 2000 census ===
As of the census of 2000, there were 1,637 people, 658 households, and 461 families residing in the city. The population density was 446.8 inhabitants per square mile (172.5/km^{2}). There were 732 housing units at an average density of 199.8 per square mile (77.1/km^{2}). The racial makeup of the city was 80.57% White, 18.45% Black or African American, 0.55% Native American, and 0.43% from two or more races. 0.79% of the population were Hispanic or Latino of any race.

There were 658 households, out of which 30.7% had children under the age of 18 living with them, 54.4% were married couples living together, 12.8% had a female householder with no husband present, and 29.8% were non-families. 27.4% of all households were made up of individuals, and 12.9% had someone living alone who was 65 years of age or older. The average household size was 2.38 and the average family size was 2.88.

In the city, the population was spread out, with 24.4% under the age of 18, 6.5% from 18 to 24, 25.7% from 25 to 44, 22.2% from 45 to 64, and 21.1% who were 65 years of age or older. The median age was 41 years. For every 100 females there were 90.3 males. For every 100 females age 18 and over, there were 82.1 males.

The median income for a household in the city was $29,800, and the median income for a family was $35,990. Males had a median income of $28,958 versus $19,792 for females. The per capita income for the city was $14,805. About 13.1% of families and 13.8% of the population were below the poverty line, including 12.5% of those under age 18 and 18.6% of those age 65 or over.

== Education ==
Public education for elementary and secondary school students is provided by the Hazen School District, which leads to graduation from Hazen High School. The district and high school mascot and athletic emblem is the Hornet with purple and white serving as the school colors.

== Climate ==
The climate in this area is characterized by hot, humid summers and generally mild to cool winters. According to the Köppen Climate Classification system, Hazen has a humid subtropical climate, abbreviated "Cfa" on climate maps.

== In popular culture ==
The city of Hazen and its police department are featured in the Reelz documentary series On Patrol: Live. It is also the central setting for the HBO documentary entitled The Invisible Pilot.

== Notable people ==
- John Hancock, an American film and television actor, born in Hazen in 1941
- Bill Sample, Republican member of the Arkansas General Assembly, born in Hazen in 1946
- Samuel Weems, disbarred lawyer and mayoral candidate, Armenian genocide denier
