= Prairie County, Arkansas =

County in Arkansas, United States

- County
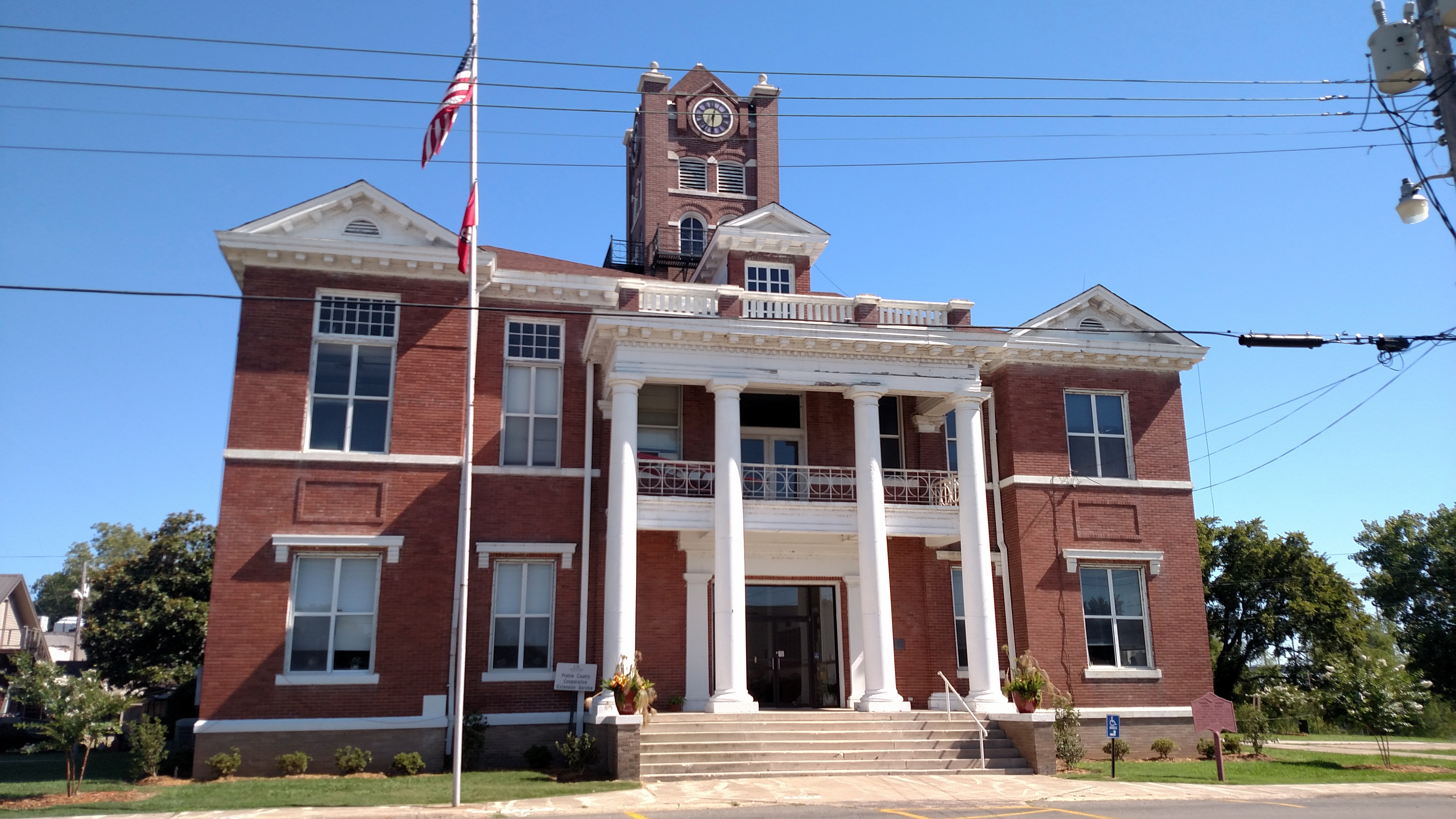
- Prairie County Courthouse in Des Arc

- Location within the U.S. state of Arkansas
- Coordinates: 34°49′41″N 91°32′12″W
- Country: United States
- State: Arkansas
- Founded: November 25, 1846
- Named for: Grand Prairie
- Seat: Des Arc, DeValls Bluff
- Largest city: Des Arc

Area
  - Total: 676 sq mi (1,750 km^{2})
  - Land: 648 sq mi (1,680 km^{2})
  - Water: 28 sq mi (73 km^{2}) 4.1%

Population (2020)
  - Total: 8,282
  - Estimate (2025): 7,923 ▼
  - Density: 12.8/sq mi (4.93/km^{2})
- Time zone: UTC−6 (Central)
  - Summer (DST): UTC−5 (CDT)
- Congressional district: 1st

Prairie County is in the Central Arkansas region of the U.S. state of Arkansas. The county is named for the Grand Prairie, a subregion of the Arkansas Delta known for rice cultivation and aquaculture that runs through the county. Created as Arkansas's 54th county in 1846, Prairie County is home to four incorporated towns, including DeValls Bluff, the southern district county seat, and two incorporated cities, including Des Arc, the northern district county seat. The county is also the site of numerous unincorporated communities and ghost towns. Occupying 676 square miles (175,000 ha), Prairie County is the median-sized county in Arkansas. As of the 2020 Census, the county's population was 8,282. Based on population, the county is the ninth-smallest county of the 75 in Arkansas.

The county is crossed by Interstate 40 (I-40), a major east–west Interstate highway running from California to North Carolina, as well as four United States highways (U.S. Route 63 [US 63], US 70, US 79, and US 165). Eleven Arkansas state highways run in the county. Prairie County is served by two public owned/public use general aviation airports and six potable water systems.

== History ==
The county at first was land given to Cherokee Indians resettled from Tennessee and was the Western band of Cherokee reservation from 1812 to 1836. Even today, an estimated 2,000 residents have some American Indian ancestry.

The town of Fredonia (Biscoe) was named for the unsuccessful 1826 attempt of Arkansas Cherokee and to create the Republic of Fredonia by Arkansas Cherokee and Texan settlers in then Mexican Texas. The town of DeValls Bluff was the Western Cherokee's seat, and is now one of Prairie County's seats.

Prairie County suffered greatly during the American Civil War. Des Arc was partly destroyed, and a local historian estimated that not more than 15 horses were left in the county by the war's end. The rest had been taken by soldiers of one army or the other.

On September 5, 1913, Lee Simms became the first person to be executed in Arkansas by the electric chair. He was executed for the crime of violent rape.

Stern's Medlar, a previously unknown plant species, was discovered in Prairie County as recently as 1990. It is not known to grow anywhere else in the world. The plant is critically endangered, with only 25 known specimens, all growing within a single small wood, now protected as the Konecny Grove Natural Area.

== Geography ==
The county is located between two primary geographic regions of Arkansas: Central Arkansas and the Arkansas Delta (in Arkansas, usually referred to as "the Delta"). The Arkansas Delta is a subregion of the Mississippi Alluvial Plain, which is a flat area consisting of rich, fertile sediment deposits from the Mississippi River between Louisiana and Illinois. The county is often described as being within the Grand Prairie, a subdivision of the Arkansas Delta known today for rice farming and aquaculture, rather than Central Arkansas or the Delta. It is this geographic feature from which the county derives its name. According to the U.S. Census Bureau, the county has a total area of 676 square miles (1,750 km^{2}), of which 648 square miles (1,680 km^{2}) is land and 28 square miles (73 km^{2}) (4.1%) is water.

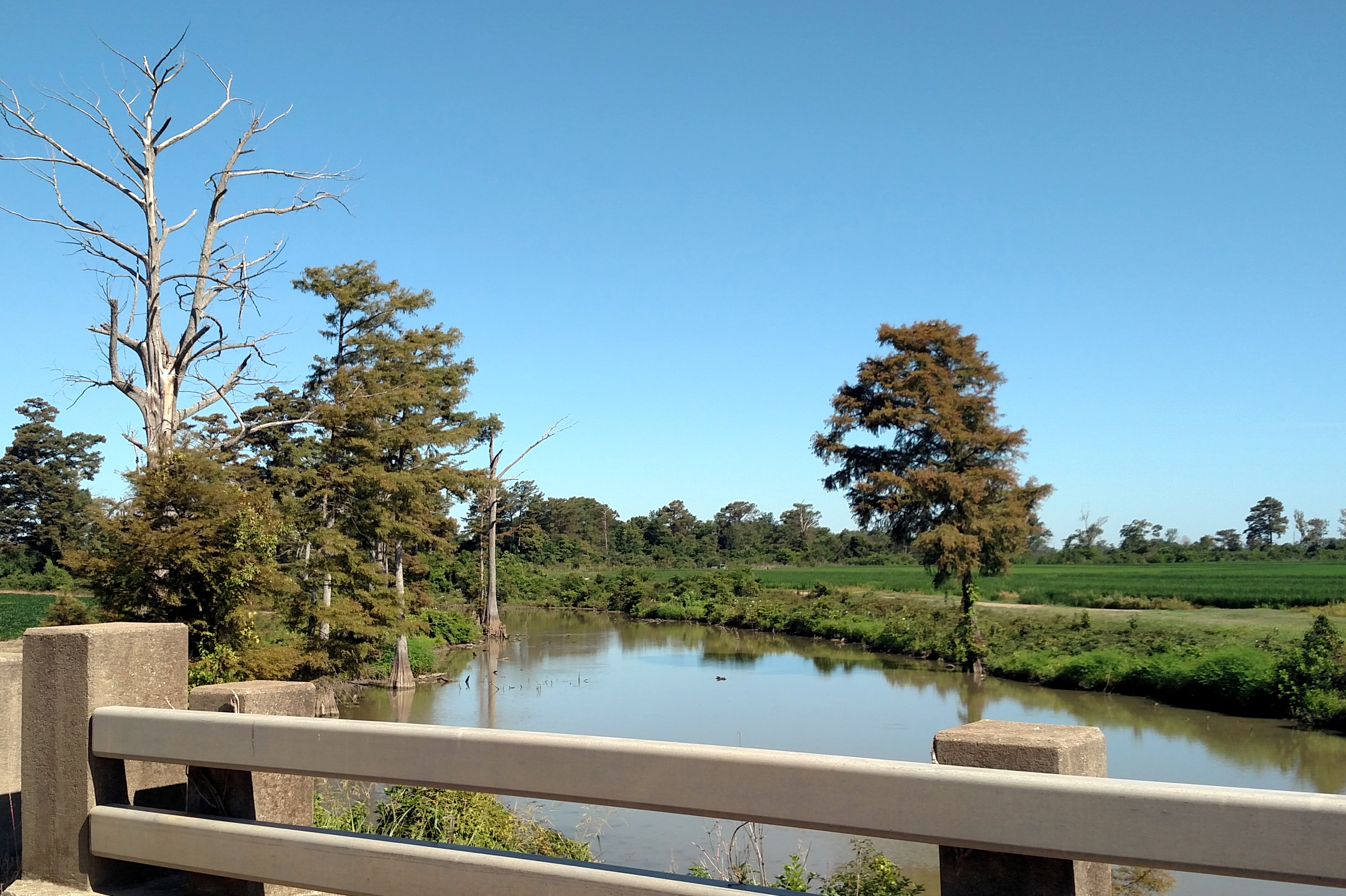
A minor bayou crosses Highway 33 and Highway 38 east of Des Arc

Prior to settlement, Prairie County was large, flat grassland distinct from the swamps and bayous in the nearby Delta. Although cotton and other row crops grew well in the Prairie's silty loam soil, rice production changed the cultivation patterns in the county at the turn of the nineteenth century. Although some prairie and riparian areas has been preserved in conservation areas, a large portion (44 percent) of the county remains in cultivation. (Note: In 2015, 103.9 thousand acres of soybeans, 63.2 thousand acres of rice, 12.1 thousand acres of corn, and 3.3 thousand acres of wheat were planted in Prairie County. Total acreage for those crops is 182,600. Prairie County has 648 square miles of land area, which is 414,720 acres based on 640 acres per square mile. Acreage for the total crops (182,600) divided by acreage for the county (414,720) is 44.0 percent.) Another large land use in Prairie County is the Cache River NWR and Wattensaw Wildlife Management Area (WMA), owned by the United States Fish and Wildlife Service and Arkansas Game and Fish Commission, respectively.

The county is located approximately 53 miles (85 km) east of Little Rock and 90 miles (140 km) west of Memphis, Tennessee. (Note: Mileages from Prairie County to Little Rock and Memphis are based on highway miles using county seat DeValls Bluff for Prairie County.) Prairie County is surrounded by five other counties: White County to the north, Woodruff County to the northeast, Monroe County to the east, Arkansas County to the south, and Lonoke County to the west.

=== Climate ===
Prairie County has a humid subtropical climate (Köppen Cfa). Prairie County experiences all four seasons, although summers can be extremely hot and humid and winters are mild with little snow. July is the hottest month of the year, with an average high of 92 °F (33.3 °C) and an average low of 73 °F (22.8 °C). Temperatures above 100 °F (38 °C) are not uncommon. January is the coldest month with an average high of 48 °F (8.9 °C) and an average low of 31 °F (−0.6 °C). The highest temperature was 109 °F (42.8 °C), and the lowest temperature recorded was −5 °F (−21 °C). Record snowfall in Des Arc occurred January 7, 1912, with 18 inches (46 cm).

Climate data for Des Arc
| Month | Jan | Feb | Mar | Apr | May | Jun | Jul | Aug | Sep | Oct | Nov | Dec | Year |
|---|---|---|---|---|---|---|---|---|---|---|---|---|---|
| Record high °F (°C) | 80 (27) | 82 (28) | 88 (31) | 93 (34) | 98 (37) | 105 (41) | 109 (43) | 109 (43) | 104 (40) | 98 (37) | 87 (31) | 79 (26) | 109 (43) |
| Mean daily maximum °F (°C) | 48 (9) | 53 (12) | 63 (17) | 72 (22) | 81 (27) | 88 (31) | 92 (33) | 91 (33) | 84 (29) | 74 (23) | 62 (17) | 51 (11) | 72 (22) |
| Mean daily minimum °F (°C) | 31 (−1) | 35 (2) | 43 (6) | 52 (11) | 61 (16) | 69 (21) | 73 (23) | 71 (22) | 63 (17) | 51 (11) | 43 (6) | 34 (1) | 52 (11) |
| Record low °F (°C) | −5 (−21) | −4 (−20) | 15 (−9) | 28 (−2) | 37 (3) | — | 55 (13) | 48 (9) | 34 (1) | 23 (−5) | 13 (−11) | −2 (−19) | −5 (−21) |
| Average precipitation inches (mm) | 3.5 (89) | 4.1 (100) | 4.8 (120) | 5.2 (130) | 5.1 (130) | 3.2 (81) | 3.1 (79) | 2.4 (61) | 3.9 (99) | 4.5 (110) | 5.0 (130) | 5.2 (130) | 50 (1,259) |
| Average snowfall inches (cm) | 1.0 (2.5) | 0 (0) | 0 (0) | 0 (0) | 0 (0) | 0 (0) | 0 (0) | 0 (0) | 0 (0) | 0 (0) | 0 (0) | 0 (0) | 1 (2.5) |
Source 1: The Weather Channel
Source 2: Weather Database

== Demographics ==
Historical population
| Census | Pop. | Note | %± |
|---|---|---|---|
| 1850 | 2,097 | | — |
| 1860 | 8,854 | | 322.2% |
| 1870 | 5,604 | | −36.7% |
| 1880 | 8,435 | | 50.5% |
| 1890 | 11,374 | | 34.8% |
| 1900 | 11,875 | | 4.4% |
| 1910 | 13,853 | | 16.7% |
| 1920 | 17,447 | | 25.9% |
| 1930 | 15,187 | | −13.0% |
| 1940 | 15,304 | | 0.8% |
| 1950 | 13,768 | | −10.0% |
| 1960 | 10,515 | | −23.6% |
| 1970 | 10,249 | | −2.5% |
| 1980 | 10,140 | | −1.1% |
| 1990 | 9,518 | | −6.1% |
| 2000 | 9,539 | | 0.2% |
| 2010 | 8,715 | | −8.6% |
| 2020 | 8,282 | | −5.0% |
| 2025 (est.) | 7,923 | ▼ | −4.3% |
U.S. Decennial Census; 1790–1960 1900–1990; 1990–2000 2010

=== 2020 census ===
As of the 2020 census, the county had a population of 8,282. The median age was 45.5 years. 21.6% of residents were under the age of 18 and 22.7% of residents were 65 years of age or older. For every 100 females there were 100.1 males, and for every 100 females age 18 and over there were 94.8 males age 18 and over.

The racial makeup of the county was 84.1% White, 11.2% Black or African American, 0.3% American Indian and Alaska Native, 0.3% Asian, <0.1% Native Hawaiian and Pacific Islander, 0.5% from some other race, and 3.6% from two or more races. Hispanic or Latino residents of any race comprised 1.8% of the population.

<0.1% of residents lived in urban areas, while 100.0% lived in rural areas.

There were 3,502 households in the county, of which 26.6% had children under the age of 18 living in them. Of all households, 48.1% were married-couple households, 19.5% were households with a male householder and no spouse or partner present, and 27.7% were households with a female householder and no spouse or partner present. About 30.7% of all households were made up of individuals and 14.6% had someone living alone who was 65 years of age or older.

There were 4,071 housing units, of which 14.0% were vacant. Among occupied housing units, 72.8% were owner-occupied and 27.2% were renter-occupied. The homeowner vacancy rate was 1.1% and the rental vacancy rate was 8.0%.

=== 2000 census ===
As of the 2000 United States census, there were 9,539 people, 3,894 households, and 2,795 families residing in the county. The population density was 6/km^{2} (16/mi^{2}). There were 4,790 housing units at an average density of 3/km^{2} (7.8/mi^{2}). The racial makeup of the county was 84.83% White, 13.71% Black or African American, 0.36% Native American, 0.18% Asian, 0.28% from other races, and 0.64% from two or more races. 0.81% of the population were Hispanic or Latino of any race.

There were 3,894 households, out of which 30.60% had children under the age of 18 living with them, 56.60% were married couples living together, 11.10% had a female householder with no husband present, and 28.20% were non-families. 25.60% of all households were made up of individuals, and 13.20% had someone living alone who was 65 years of age or older. The average household size was 2.41 and the average family size was 2.88.

In the county, the population was spread out, with 23.90% under the age of 18, 7.50% from 18 to 24, 26.10% from 25 to 44, 25.10% from 45 to 64, and 17.30% who were 65 years of age or older. The median age was 40 years. For every 100 females there were 97.00 males. For every 100 females age 18 and over, there were 93.40 males age 18 and over.

The median income for a household in the county was $29,990, and the median income for a family was $36,131. Males had a median income of $28,413 versus $18,808 for females. The per capita income for the county was $15,907. About 12.20% of families and 15.50% of the population were below the poverty line, including 21.00% of those under age 18 and 16.80% of those age 65 or over.

== Economy ==
The economy of Prairie County is primarily agricultural (25.6%), followed by government employees (14.3%), and professional services (14.3%).

== Government and politics ==
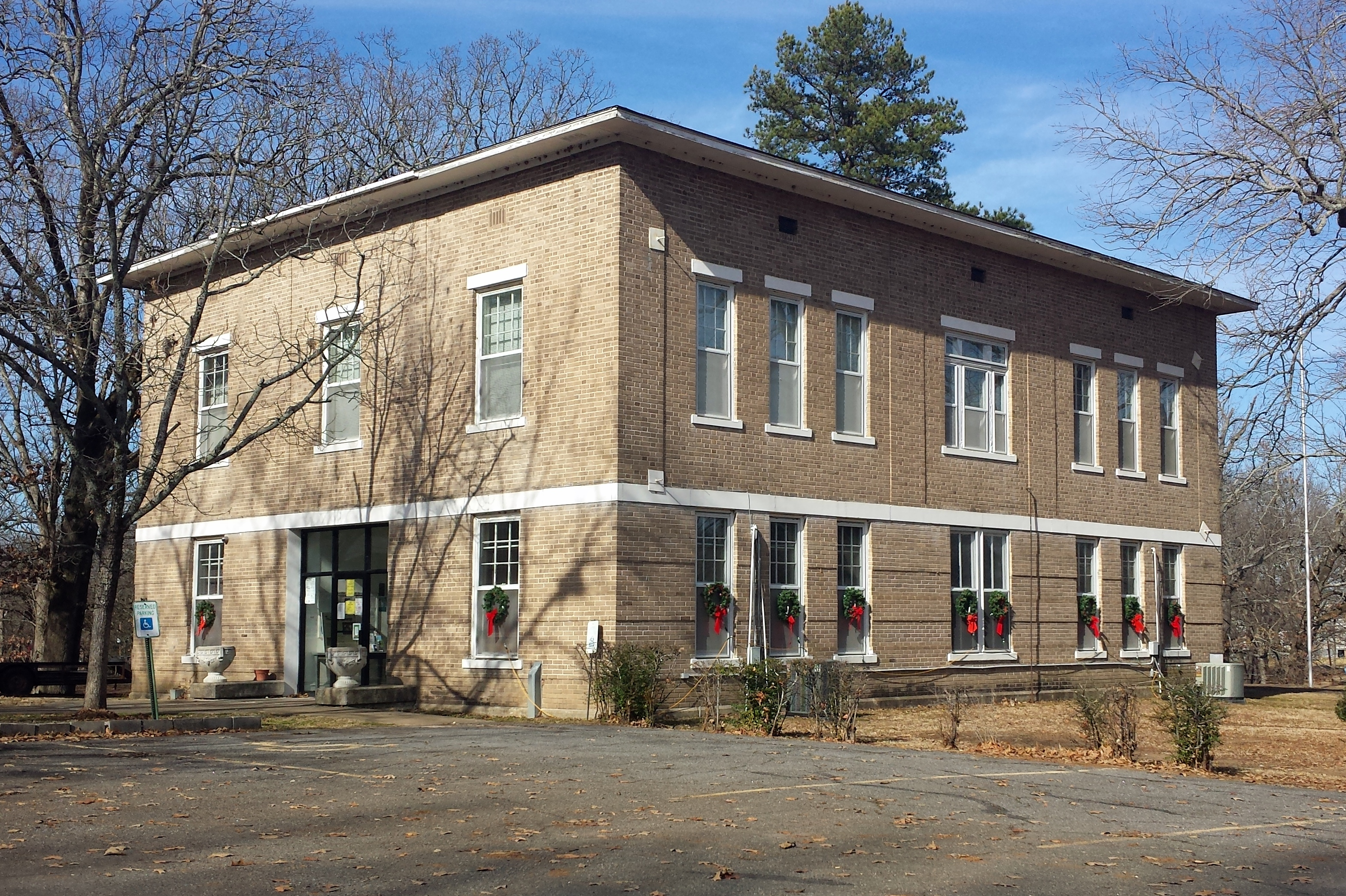
The Prairie County Courthouse in DeValls Bluff is the seat of county government in the southern district of the county

The county government is a constitutional body granted specific powers by the Constitution of Arkansas and the Arkansas Code. The quorum court is the legislative branch of the county government and controls all spending and revenue collection. Representatives are called justices of the peace and are elected from county districts every even-numbered year. The number of districts in a county vary from nine to fifteen, and district boundaries are drawn by the county election commission. The Prairie County Quorum Court has nine members. Presiding over quorum court meetings is the county judge, who serves as the chief operating officer of the county. The county judge is elected at-large and does not vote in quorum court business, although capable of vetoing quorum court decisions.

Prairie County, Arkansas Elected countywide officials
| Position | Officeholder | Party |
|---|---|---|
| County Judge | Lawrence Holloway | Republican |
| County Clerk/Circuit Clerk | Gaylon Hale | Republican |
| Sheriff | Rick Parson | (Unknown) |
| Treasurer | Tabitha Gates | (Unknown) |
| Collector | Troy Geisler | (Unknown) |
| Assessor | Karan Skarda | (Unknown) |
| Coroner | Byrum Kelly | Independent |

The composition of the Quorum Court following the 2024 elections is 9 Republicans.

Incumbents are:

- District 1: Bill Calhoun (R)
- District 2: Zach Payne (R)
- District 3: Ronald Eans (R)
- District 4: Jordan Smith (R)
- District 5: Gary King (R)
- District 6: Rick Stallings (R)
- District 7: Levi Childress (R)
- District 8: Bobby Willeford (R)
- District 9: Paul Hooks (R)

Additionally, the townships of Prairie County are entitled to elect their own respective constables, as set forth by the Constitution of Arkansas. Constables are largely of historical significance as they were used to keep the peace in rural areas when travel was more difficult.

The township constables as of the 2024 elections are:

- Belcher-Tyler: Jeffrey Uhiren (R)
- Calhoun: Gary Carter (R)
- Center: Joe Ryan Mills (R)
- Des Arc: Michael McIntosh (R)
- Hazen: Mike Corley (R)

=== Politics ===
Since the late 20th century, the majority-white Prairie County has traditionally supported Republican Party presidential candidates, except when an alternative from another Southern state has been present. The county supported Arkansas Governor Bill Clinton by a wide margin, as well as Georgia Governor Jimmy Carter, Alabama Governor George Wallace (running as an independent), and Texas native Lyndon Johnson. Following Clinton, the county has turned increasingly Republican, supporting Donald Trump 72.7% in 2016.

United States presidential election results for Prairie County, Arkansas
| Year | Republican | | Democratic | | Third party(ies) | |
| Year | No. | % | No. | % | No. | % |
|---|---|---|---|---|---|---|
| 1896 | 633 | 35.50% | 1,145 | 64.22% | 5 | 0.28% |
| 1900 | 496 | 36.44% | 856 | 62.89% | 9 | 0.66% |
| 1904 | 648 | 49.28% | 639 | 48.59% | 28 | 2.13% |
| 1908 | 812 | 41.13% | 1,103 | 55.88% | 59 | 2.99% |
| 1912 | 376 | 31.70% | 647 | 54.55% | 163 | 13.74% |
| 1916 | 655 | 38.17% | 1,061 | 61.83% | 0 | 0.00% |
| 1920 | 842 | 45.64% | 962 | 52.14% | 41 | 2.22% |
| 1924 | 386 | 32.68% | 730 | 61.81% | 65 | 5.50% |
| 1928 | 613 | 37.82% | 1,000 | 61.69% | 8 | 0.49% |
| 1932 | 158 | 8.27% | 1,743 | 91.21% | 10 | 0.52% |
| 1936 | 282 | 17.56% | 1,321 | 82.25% | 3 | 0.19% |
| 1940 | 336 | 23.86% | 1,069 | 75.92% | 3 | 0.21% |
| 1944 | 465 | 29.34% | 1,117 | 70.47% | 3 | 0.19% |
| 1948 | 260 | 15.49% | 1,020 | 60.79% | 398 | 23.72% |
| 1952 | 871 | 34.28% | 1,664 | 65.49% | 6 | 0.24% |
| 1956 | 917 | 37.58% | 1,504 | 61.64% | 19 | 0.78% |
| 1960 | 734 | 27.85% | 1,680 | 63.73% | 222 | 8.42% |
| 1964 | 1,476 | 44.59% | 1,812 | 54.74% | 22 | 0.66% |
| 1968 | 693 | 19.35% | 875 | 24.43% | 2,014 | 56.23% |
| 1972 | 2,186 | 71.46% | 873 | 28.54% | 0 | 0.00% |
| 1976 | 813 | 22.28% | 2,836 | 77.72% | 0 | 0.00% |
| 1980 | 1,855 | 47.63% | 1,928 | 49.50% | 112 | 2.88% |
| 1984 | 2,407 | 62.10% | 1,437 | 37.07% | 32 | 0.83% |
| 1988 | 1,947 | 53.25% | 1,688 | 46.17% | 21 | 0.57% |
| 1992 | 1,154 | 29.17% | 2,366 | 59.81% | 436 | 11.02% |
| 1996 | 1,025 | 28.67% | 2,211 | 61.85% | 339 | 9.48% |
| 2000 | 1,862 | 53.09% | 1,563 | 44.57% | 82 | 2.34% |
| 2004 | 2,030 | 56.02% | 1,562 | 43.10% | 32 | 0.88% |
| 2008 | 2,223 | 65.75% | 1,048 | 31.00% | 110 | 3.25% |
| 2012 | 2,153 | 68.55% | 880 | 28.02% | 108 | 3.44% |
| 2016 | 2,505 | 72.74% | 814 | 23.64% | 125 | 3.63% |
| 2020 | 2,786 | 79.71% | 654 | 18.71% | 55 | 1.57% |
| 2024 | 2,628 | 82.13% | 524 | 16.38% | 48 | 1.50% |

In Congress, Arkansas has been represented by two Republican senators (John Boozman and Tom Cotton) since January 3, 2015, ending a long history of Democratic hegemony. In the House of Representatives, Prairie County is within the Arkansas 1st district with many other agricultural Delta counties on the eastern side of the state. The Arkansas 1st has been represented by Rick Crawford since 2010.

In the Arkansas Senate, Prairie County is within the 10th District, which also covers all of Cross, Jackson, Monroe, and Woodruff Counties and parts of Arkansas, Lee, Lonoke, Poinsett and St. Francis Counties. It is represented by Republican Ronald Caldwell of Wynne. It was previously in the 28th District, which covered portions of Arkansas, Lonoke, Monroe, White, and Woodruff counties. The district was represented by Jonathan Dismang, a Beebe Republican, from January 2013 until redistricting in 2023. In the Arkansas House of Representatives, Prairie County is split between the 60th and 61st districts. District 60, which covers western parts of Prairie County and also contains portions of Lonoke county, is represented by Republican Roger Lynch of Lonoke. District 60, which covers eastern parts of Prairie County and also contains portions of Arkansas, Jackson, Monroe, and Woodruff counties, is represented by Republican Jeremiah Moore of Clarendon. Prairie County was previously in District 13, which was represented by David Hillman of Almyra from 2013 to 2023. Hillman switched to the Republican Party shortly after winning reelection in November 2016.

== Education ==
Public education in Prairie County is primarily provided by two districts:

- Des Arc School District, with three schools serving more than 600 students PreK-12 in northern Prairie County; includes Des Arc High School.
- Hazen School District, with two schools serving more than 500 students in southern Prairie County; includes Hazen High School. In 2006, the DeValls Bluff School District was consolidated into the Hazen district.

== Communities ==
=== Cities ===
- Des Arc (County seat)
- DeValls Bluff (County seat)

=== Towns ===
- Hazen
- Fredonia (Biscoe)
- Ulm

=== Unincorporated communities ===
- Barrettsville
- Bay Plantation
- Beulah
- Brasfield
- Buck's Landing
- Center Point
- Childers
- Crossroad
- Edwards
- Erwin
- Fairmount
- Four Mile Corner
- Gospoda
- Hallsville
- Harrys
- Hayley
- Hickory Plains
- Jasmine
- Kay
- Letchworth
- Little Dixie
- Lookout
- Mesa
- Peppers Lake
- Peppers Landing
- Plunketts
- Sand Hill
- Screeton
- Siedenstricker
- Slovak
- Tarnceville
- Tollville
- Vaby

=== Historical communities ===
- Balle
- Bardill
- Beecher
- Cuneo
- Enarc
- Harrys
- Hunterton
- La Grue
- Leighton
- Mooresville
- Nahay
- Slovaktown
- Spear
- Stineville
- Super
- Thomas
- Uzzett
- Veits
- Willard
- Yuma

=== Townships ===
Townships in Arkansas are the divisions of a county. Each township includes unincorporated areas; some may have incorporated cities or towns within part of their boundaries. Arkansas townships have limited purposes in modern times. However, the United States census does list Arkansas population based on townships (sometimes referred to as "county subdivisions" or "minor civil divisions"). Townships are also of value for historical purposes in terms of genealogical research. Each town or city is within one or more townships in an Arkansas county based on census maps and publications. The townships of Prairie County are listed below; listed in parentheses are the cities, towns, and/or census-designated places that are fully or partially inside the township.

- Belcher
- Bullard
- Calhoun
- Center
- Des Arc
- Hazen (Hazen)
- Hickory Plain
- Lower Surrounded Hill (Fredonia (Biscoe))
- Roc Roe (Ulm)
- Tyler
- Union
- Upper Surrounded Hill
- Wattensaw (DeValls Bluff)
- White River (Des Arc)

== Infrastructure ==
=== Aviation ===
Prairie County contains two public owned/public use general aviation airports. Both were built during World War II by the United States Army Air Forces, and turned over to local municipalities following the war. Both are predominantly used for agricultural (spraying) operations.

The Hazen Municipal Airport is located west of Hazen along US 70. For the twelve-month period ending April 30, 2014, the facility saw 32,000 general aviation operations. The Stuttgart Municipal Airport is located in southern Prairie County near the Arkansas County line. For the twelve-month period ending July 31, 2014, the facility saw 35,000 general aviation operations, 3,000 military operations, and 2,500 air taxi operations.

=== Major highways ===
- Interstate 40
- US Highway 63
- US Highway 70
- US Highway 79
- US Highway 165
- Highway 11
- Highway 13
- Highway 33
- Highway 38
- Highway 86
- Highway 249
- Highway 302
- Highway 323
- Highway 343
- Highway 959
- Highway 980

=== Utilities ===
The Arkansas Department of Health is responsible for the regulation and oversight of public water systems throughout the state. Prairie County contains six community water systems: Biscoe Waterworks, Des Arc Waterworks, DeValls Bluff Waterworks, East Prairie County Public Water Authority (PWA), Hazen Waterworks, Southeast [White County] PWA, and Ulm Waterworks. Des Arc Waterworks has the largest retail population (3,882), followed by Hazen (1,600), and East Prairie County PWA (699). All community water systems in Prairie County use groundwater as their source of raw water, except Ulm, which purchases all water from Grand Prairie Regional Water and the small portion served by Southeast White County PWA.

== See also ==
- List of counties in Arkansas
- List of lakes in Prairie County, Arkansas
- National Register of Historic Places listings in Prairie County, Arkansas
