= Des Arc High School =

Public school in Des Arc, Arkansas, United States

Location
- 600 Main Street; Des Arc, Arkansas 72040; United States; 34°58′42″N 91°29′57″W

Information
- School type: Public comprehensive
- Status: Open
- School district: Des Arc School District
- Superintendent: Marc Sherrell
- CEEB code: 040620
- NCES School ID: 050519000240
- Principal: BJ Paschal
- Teaching staff: 19.73 (on FTE basis)
- Grades: 7–12
- Enrollment: 264 (2023-2024)
- Student to teacher ratio: 13.38
- Education system: ADE Smart Core curriculum
- Classes offered: Regular (Core), Career Focus, Advanced Placement (AP)
- Colors: Green and white
- Athletics conference: 2A Region 6
- Mascot: Eagle
- Team name: Des Arc Eagles
- Accreditation: ADE
- Feeder to: Des Arc Elementary School (PK–6)
- Affiliation: Arkansas Activities Association
- Website: www.desarcschools.org/page/high-school

Des Arc High School, which opened in 1872, is a comprehensive public high school located in Des Arc, Arkansas, United States, and is an all-inclusive public school. The school provides education to over 170 kids in grades 7th through 12th that residentially live in Prairie County and Lonoke County communities encompassing 265.68 square miles (688.1 km^{2}) of land including all or portions of Des Arc, Biscoe, Carlisle, Ward, Griffithville, and Lonoke. It is one of two public high schools in Prairie County and the only high school administered by the Des Arc School District. If a student does not reside in Des Arc or Prairie County but the parents still wish to send their child to Des Arc High School, there is a School Choice for Non-Resident Students application that the parents can fill out. Two applications must be filled out, one for Des Arc High School and one for the high school that the student is transferring from. Des Arc High School is one of two of the high schools in Prairie County.

DAHS is accredited by the Arkansas Department of Education and receives Title I federal funding. Title I federal funding is the largest federal aid program for public schools in the United States. Title I is a federal entitlement program that gives funds to schools in need based on student enrollment, the free and reduced lunch percentage for each school, and other informative data.

== Academics ==
Des Arc High School has two different curriculum courses, core and smart core. The core curriculum includes the graduation course credit requirements established by the Division of Elementary and Secondary Education. The smart core curriculum offers Advanced Placement (AP) and honors classes and online college courses including: AP Biology, AP Language Composition, AP U.S. History, AP Literature, Honors English 9–12, Honors Physical Science, College Algebra, and College Composition I and II.

DAHS is academically ranked 48th within the state of Arkansas and is ranked 4,132 nationally in 2019. These rankings are a combination of performance on state-required tests, graduation, and how prepared students are for college upon graduation.

== Athletics ==
The Des Arc High School mascot and athletic emblem is the Eagle with green and white serving as the school colors.

The Des Arc Eagles compete in interscholastic activities within the 2A Classification administered by the Arkansas Activities Association. The Eagles play within the 2A Region 6 Conference. The Eagles participate in football, basketball (boys/girls), cheer, cross country (boys/girls), baseball, fastpitch softball, track and field (boys/girls) and Trap Shooting.

== Notable people ==
- Kevin Campbell - MLB player
