= Tollville, Arkansas =

- Unincorporated community
- Location within Arkansas Location within the United States
- Coordinates: 34°43′11″N 91°32′07″W
- Country: United States
- State: Arkansas
- County: Prairie
- Elevation: 220 ft (67 m)
- Time zone: UTC-6 (Central (CST))
  - Summer (DST): UTC-5 (CDT)
- Area code: 870
- GNIS feature ID: 57211

Tollville is an unincorporated community east of Little Rock in Prairie County, Arkansas, United States.

== History ==
The community was reportedly founded by the Toll family, who were English emigrants. Founding families also included the Claytons and the Foots. Lord Thomas Marsh Horsfall, a local Englishman and entrepreneur, owned much of this prairie ground in the late 1880s. Many residents worshiped at an Episcopal Church (St. Peter's on the Prairie) that was erected in 1904.
