= Hazen School District =

School district in Arkansas, United States

Address
- 477 North Hazen Avenue Hazen, Arkansas, 72064; United States

District information
- Type: Public
- Grades: PreK–12
- NCES District ID: 0507530

Students and staff
- Students: 565
- Teachers: 49.14
- Staff: 60.0
- Student–teacher ratio: 11.5

Other information
- Website: www.hazen.k12.ar.us

Hazen School District is a school district in Prairie County, Arkansas, headquartered in Hazen. In addition to Hazen, it includes DeValls Bluff, Fredonia (Biscoe), and Ulm. The mascot is the hornet, and it has two schools: Hazen High School and Hazen Elementary School.

The DeValls Bluff School District consolidated into the Hazen district on July 1, 2006.
