= Samuel Weems =

American lawyer (1936–2003)

Samuel A. Weems (December 12, 1936 – January 25, 2003) was an American lawyer. His personal conduct and misconduct allegations made him the subject of substantial scrutiny. An Armenian genocide denialist, he wrote Armenia: The Secrets of a "Christian" Terrorist State. He was disbarred by the Arkansas Bar Association for mixing clients' money with his own, convicted of arson and insurance fraud.

== Biography ==
Weems was disbarred while holding the office of prosecuting attorney for mixing his clients' money with his own. A year later he was convicted of arson and conspiring to defraud an insurance firm, but was not immediately removed from the office, despite the disbarment decision. He unsuccessfully ran for the position of mayor of Hazen, Arkansas, in 1994 and 1998. He made various controversial remarks such as "the Armenians have never been known as truth tellers" and "the number one export of Armenia is terrorism". Weems' book Armenia: The Secrets of a "Christian" Terrorist State was condemned by the Armenian Assembly of America as "outrageous and racist anti-Armenian propaganda". The book was subsequently published in Azerbaijani and Turkish.

In March 2002, Weems visited Turkey on the occasion of the 81st anniversary of the assassination of Talaat Pasha, one of the perpetrators of the Armenian genocide, and, in numerous interviews with news agencies as well as in the universities of Istanbul and Ankara, spoke on the "Armenian issue" and alleged a smear campaign against Turkey in Europe and the United States. He also made arrangements for the printing of his book in Turkish. He appears in Sari Gelin, a documentary denying the Armenian genocide that was sponsored by the Ankara Chamber of Commerce. His second book about the Armenische Legion, alleging an Armenian anti-Jewish conspiracy, was almost complete and ready for printing before he died. An obituary, published by Assembly of Turkish American Associations in their newspaper The Turkish Times, stated that "Weems loved Turkey, was a great admirer of Atatürk and was devoted to Turkish causes, and despite many threats to his life, he worked relentlessly to let the people know the truth about the Armenian issue."

Weems died of a heart attack on January 25, 2003, and was survived by his wife, Gülnur, and son. He continues to be best known for his advocacy of, and contribution to, the denial of the Armenian genocide.
