= DeValls Bluff School District =

Defunct school district in Arkansas, United States

DeValls Bluff School District No. 1 (DVBSD) was a school district headquartered in DeValls Bluff, Arkansas. It had two schools: Devalls Bluff Elementary School and Devalls Bluff High School. The mascot was the scrapper.

The DeValls Bluff district consolidated into the Hazen School District on July 1, 2006.
