= DeValls Bluff, Arkansas =

City in Arkansas, United States

DeVall's Bluff, Arkansas
- City
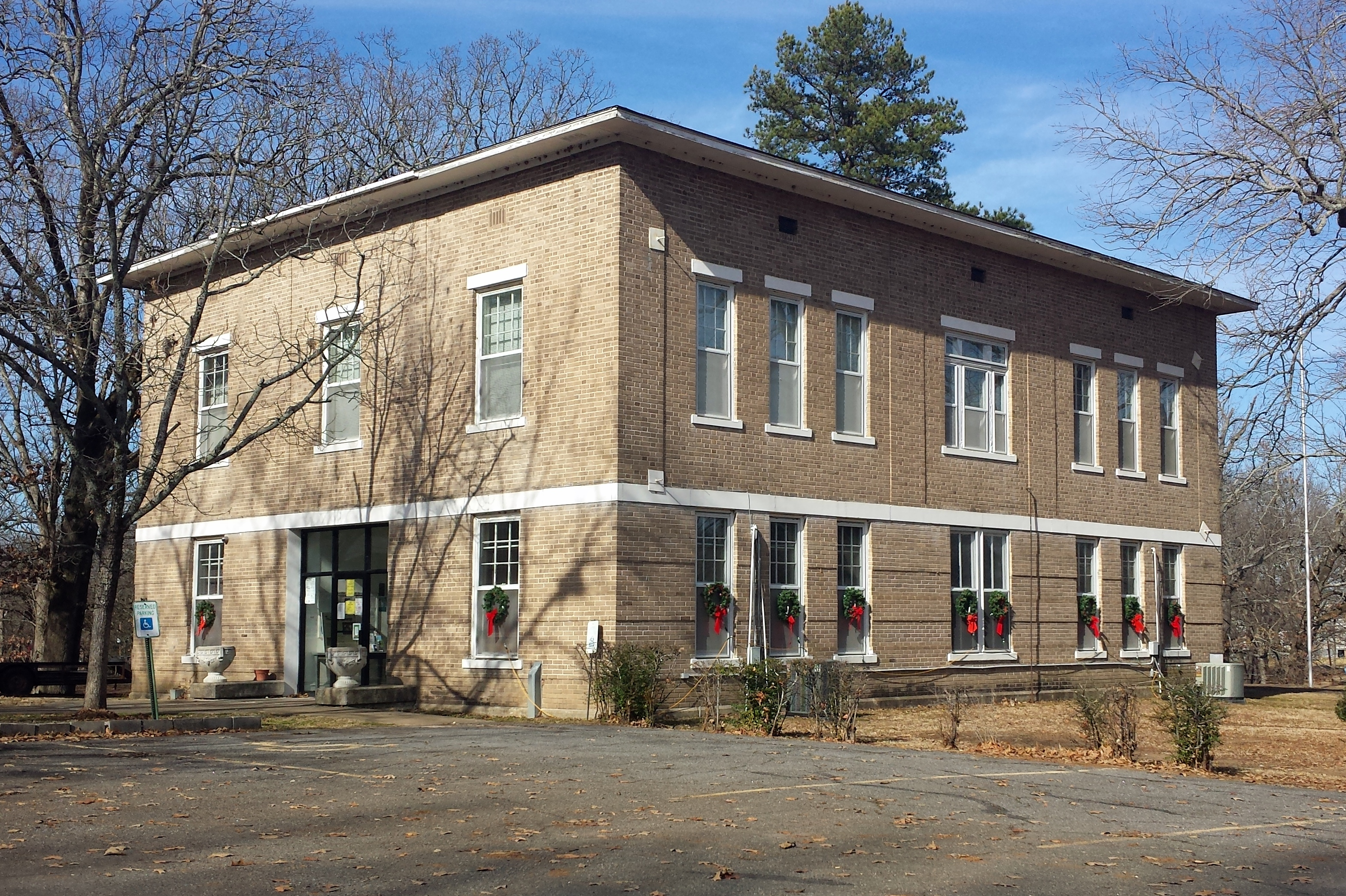
- Prairie County Courthouse, Southern District

- Location in Prairie County and Arkansas

- Location in the United States
- Coordinates: 34°47′5″N 91°27′37″W
- Country: United States
- State: Arkansas
- County: Prairie
- Township: Wattensaw
- Founded: December 12, 1856
- Incorporated: April 4, 1866
- Named for: Jacob M. DeVall

Area
  - Total: 1.16 sq mi (3.00 km^{2})
  - Land: 1.09 sq mi (2.83 km^{2})
  - Water: 0.066 sq mi (0.17 km^{2})
- Elevation: 190 ft (58 m)

Population (2020)
  - Total: 520
  - Estimate (2025): 490 ▼
  - Density: 476.1/sq mi (183.83/km^{2})
- Time zone: UTC-6 (Central (CST))
  - Summer (DST): UTC-5 (CDT)
- ZIP code: 72041
- Area code: 870
- FIPS code: 05-18640
- GNIS feature ID: 76762
- Highways: U.S. Highway 70
- Major airport: Clinton National Airport (LIT)

DeVall's Bluff, officially the City of DeVall's Bluff, is a city in and the county seat of the southern district of Prairie County, Arkansas, United States. The population was 520 at the 2020 census.

== History ==
Prairie County has always been important to Arkansas for the transportation of people and goods throughout the state. Initially, it was the White River that gave the agricultural county its importance for transport, since waterways were the primary means of long-distance transportation in the period before the development of railroads. Prairie County was cut from Arkansas, Pulaski, Monroe, St. Francis, and White counties in 1846 and included present-day Lonoke County. European settlement in Prairie County came in the 19th century, with Jacob M. DeVall and his son, Chappel, becoming the first recorded settlers around DeVall's Bluff according to 1851 tax records.

=== Civil War ===
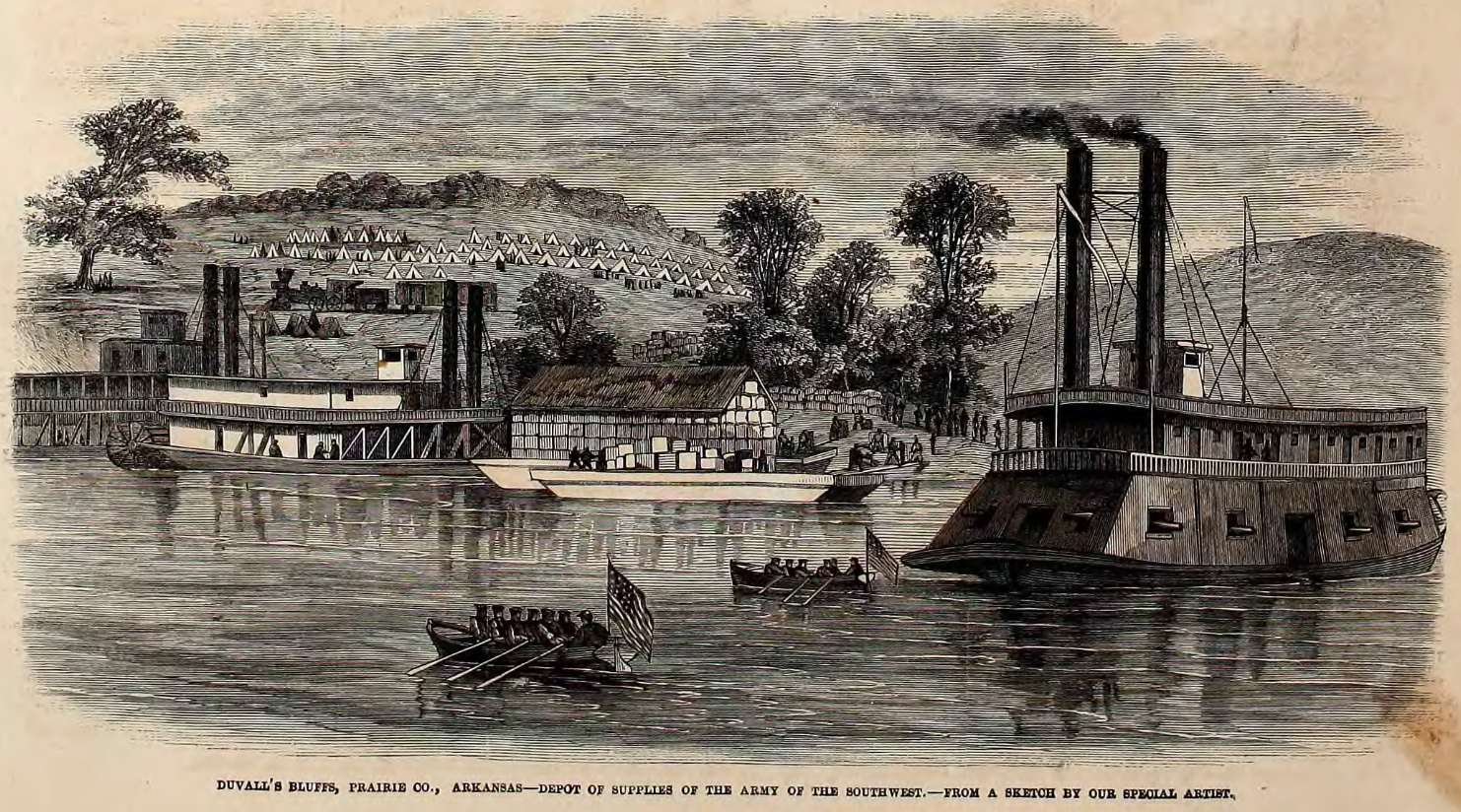
DeVall's Bluff during the Civil War.

During the American Civil War, the city was a trading center on the White River, which continued to be the primary shipping corridor when the Arkansas River was unnavigable. A railroad connection between North Little Rock and DeVall's Bluff gave the city further strategic importance. Union forces traveling up the White from Arkansas Post under the command of Brigadier General Willis Gorman captured DeVall's Bluff on January 18, 1863. However, the Union forces eventually returned to Arkansas Post, and the city returned to Confederate control.

Following the capture of Little Rock, Union cavalry led by Brigadier General John W. Davidson joined with gunboats under the command of Lieutenant George Bache in Clarendon on August 9, 1863, and traveled up the White River to capture DeVall's Bluff. Major General Frederick Steele proceeded to DeVall's Bluff from Helena, and the city was used to house supplies and injured Union soldiers for the remainder of the war.

== Geography ==
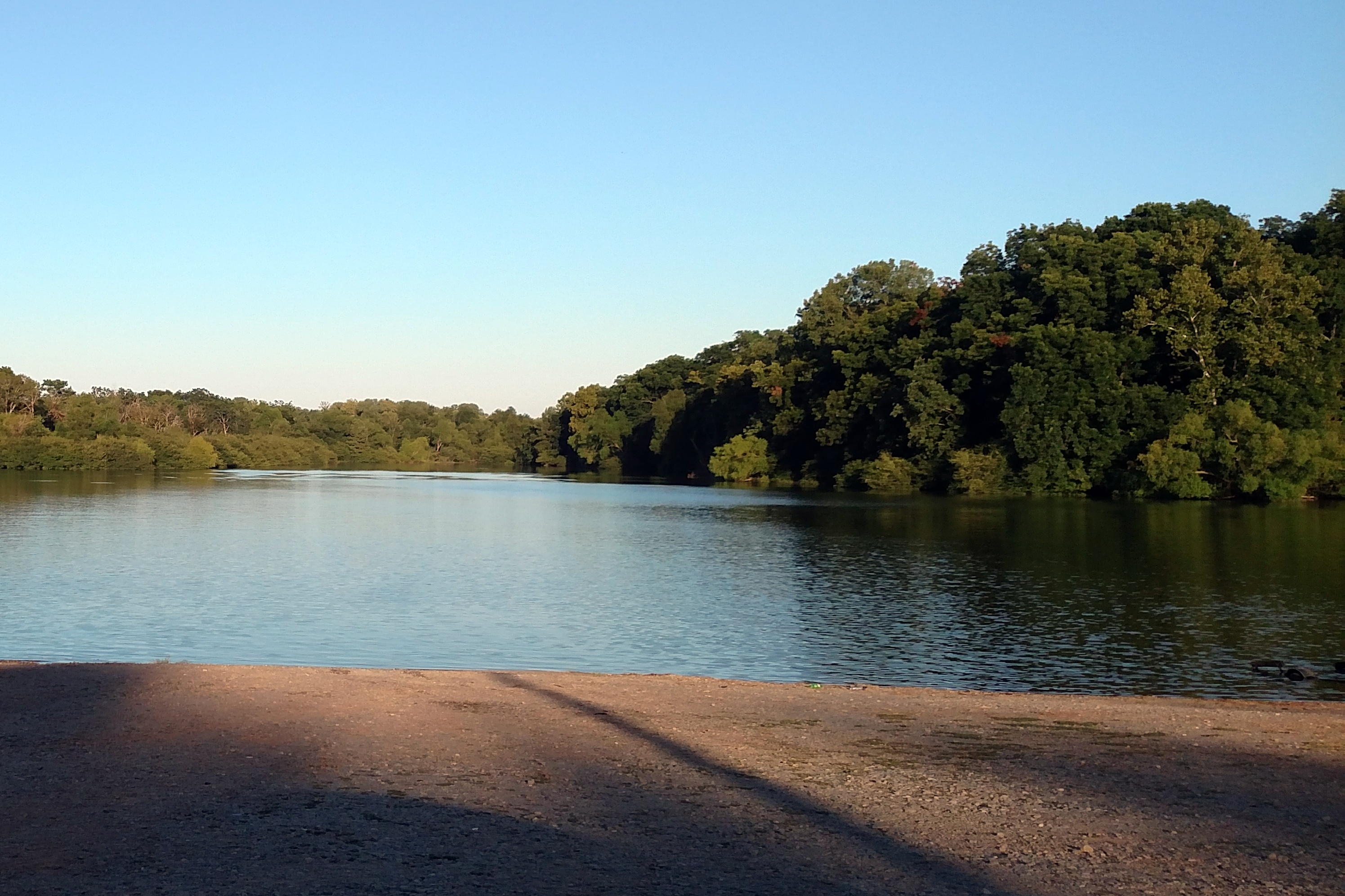
An oxbow lake of the White River.

DeVall's Bluff is located at 34°47′5″N 91°27′37″W (34.784760, -91.460346). The city is located within the Grand Prairie section of Prairie County, a subdivision of the Mississippi embayment within the Mississippi Alluvial Plain. Historically, the Grand Prairie was a flat grassland between the Arkansas River and the White River. However, the area was subject to clear cutting for row agriculture by early settlers. Today, the area is defined by rice cultivation, aquaculture and duck hunting.

According to the United States Census Bureau, the town has a total area of 2.8 km^{2} (1.1 sq mi), of which 2.7 km^{2} (1.0 sq mi) is land and 0.2 km^{2} (0.077 sq mi) (6.42%) is water.

== Demographics ==
Historical population
Census	Pop.	Note	%±
1880	186		—
1890	380		104.3%
1900	605		59.2%
1910	924		52.7%
1920	885		−4.2%
1930	672		−24.1%
1940	686		2.1%
1950	830		21.0%
1960	654		−21.2%
1970	622		−4.9%
1980	738		18.6%
1990	702		−4.9%
2000	783		11.5%
2010	619		−20.9%
2020	520		−16.0%
2025 (est.)	490	▼	−5.8%
Encyclopedia of Arkansas; History and Culture

As of the census of 2000, there were 783 people, 334 households, and 218 families residing in the town. The population density was 293.5 people /km^{2} (760 people/mi^{2}). There were 389 housing units at an average density of 145.8 units /km^{2} (378 units/mi^{2}). The racial makeup of the town was 67.82% White, 31.80% Black or African American, 0.13% Asian, and 0.26% from two or more races. 0.13% of the population were Hispanic or Latino of any race.

There were 334 households, out of which 33.2% had children under the age of 18 living with them, 43.7% were married couples living together, 17.4% had a female householder with no husband present, and 34.7% were non-families. 31.7% of all households were made up of individuals, and 17.1% had someone living alone who was 65 years of age or older. The average household size was 2.34 and the average family size was 2.96.

In the town the population was spread out, with 28.6% under the age of 18, 6.8% from 18 to 24, 25.5% from 25 to 44, 20.9% from 45 to 64, and 18.1% who were 65 years of age or older. The median age was 38 years. For every 100 females, there were 79.6 males. For every 100 females age 18 and over, there were 77.5 males.

The median income for a household in the town was $21,534, and the median income for a family was $32,708. Males had a median income of $28,088 versus $16,771 for females. The per capita income for the town was $13,582. About 18.4% of families and 23.6% of the population were below the poverty line, including 28.7% of those under age 18 and 22.1% of those age 65 or over.

== Education ==
Hazen School District is the area school district, and operates Hazen High School. The DeValls Bluff School District consolidated into the Hazen district on July 1, 2006.
