= Ulm, Arkansas =

- Town
- Location of Ulm in Prairie County, Arkansas.
- Coordinates: 34°34′34″N 91°27′42″W
- Country: United States
- State: Arkansas
- County: Prairie
- Named for: Ulm, Germany

Area
  - Total: 0.26 sq mi (0.68 km^{2})
  - Land: 0.26 sq mi (0.68 km^{2})
  - Water: 0 sq mi (0.00 km^{2})
- Elevation: 210 ft (64 m)

Population (2020)
  - Total: 175
  - Estimate (2025): 178 ▲
  - Density: 671.1/sq mi (259.12/km^{2})
- Time zone: UTC-6 (Central (CST))
  - Summer (DST): UTC-5 (CDT)
- ZIP code: 72170
- Area code: 870
- FIPS code: 05-70760
- GNIS feature ID: 2406773

Ulm /ˈʊ.ləm/ is a town in Prairie County, Arkansas, United States. As of the 2020 census, Ulm had a population of 175.

== Geography ==
According to the United States Census Bureau, the town has a total area of 0.7 km^{2} (0.3 mi^{2}), all land.

== Demographics ==
Historical population
| Census | Pop. | Note | %± |
|---|---|---|---|
| 1910 | 115 | | — |
| 1920 | 194 | | 68.7% |
| 1930 | 152 | | −21.6% |
| 1940 | 146 | | −3.9% |
| 1950 | 131 | | −10.3% |
| 1960 | 140 | | 6.9% |
| 1970 | 185 | | 32.1% |
| 1980 | 201 | | 8.6% |
| 1990 | 193 | | −4.0% |
| 2000 | 205 | | 6.2% |
| 2010 | 170 | | −17.1% |
| 2020 | 175 | | 2.9% |
| 2025 (est.) | 178 | ▲ | 1.7% |
U.S. Decennial Census

As of the census of 2000, there were 205 people, 85 households, and 60 families residing in the town. The population density was 304.4/km^{2} (797.4/mi^{2}). There were 89 housing units at an average density of 132.2/km^{2} (346.2/mi^{2}). The racial makeup of the town was 93.17% White, 3.90% Black or African American, 0.98% from other races, and 1.95% from two or more races. 0.98% of the population were Hispanic or Latino of any race.

There were 85 households, out of which 30.6% had children under the age of 18 living with them, 47.1% were married couples living together, 16.5% had a female householder with no husband present, and 29.4% were non-families. 28.2% of all households were made up of individuals, and 14.1% had someone living alone who was 65 years of age or older. The average household size was 2.41 and the average family size was 2.88.

In the town, the population was spread out, with 23.9% under the age of 18, 6.8% from 18 to 24, 25.9% from 25 to 44, 26.8% from 45 to 64, and 16.6% who were 65 years of age or older. The median age was 43 years. For every 100 females, there were 88.1 males. For every 100 females age 18 and over, there were 85.7 males.

The median income for a household in the town was $31,458, and the median income for a family was $32,083. Males had a median income of $30,536 versus $18,750 for females. The per capita income for the town was $13,428. About 4.4% of families and 5.2% of the population were below the poverty line, including none of those under the age of eighteen and 12.8% of those 65 or over.

== Climate ==
The climate in this area is characterized by hot, humid summers and generally mild to cool winters. According to the Köppen Climate Classification system, Ulm has a humid subtropical climate, abbreviated "Cfa" on climate maps.

== Education ==
Ulm is in the Hazen School District, which operates Hazen High School.
