= Hazen High School (Arkansas) =

Location
- 477 North Hazen Avenue; Hazen, Arkansas 72064; United States; 34°47′03″N 91°34′50″W

Information
- Type: Public secondary
- School district: Hazen School District
- NCES District ID: 0507530
- CEEB code: 041055
- NCES School ID: 050753000465
- Teaching staff: 31.66 (on FTE basis)
- Grades: 9–12
- Enrollment: 252 (2023–2024)
- Student to teacher ratio: 7.96
- Campus type: Rural
- Colors: Purple and white
- Sports: Football, golf, basketball, baseball, softball, track & field
- Mascot: Hornet
- Team name: Hazen Hornets
- Accreditation: Arkansas Department of Education; AdvancED (1953–)
- Affiliations: Arkansas Activities Association
- Website: www.hazen.k12.ar.us/o/hhs

Hazen High School is an accredited public secondary school located in rural, distant community of Hazen, Arkansas, United States. The school provides comprehensive education to more than 150 students annually in grades nine through twelve. Hazen High School is one of two public high schools in Prairie County and is the sole high school administered by the Hazen School District.

In addition to Hazen, the school district, and therefore the high school's attendance zone, includes DeValls Bluff, Fredonia (Biscoe), and Ulm.

== Academics ==
The assumed course of study for students is to complete the Smart Core curriculum developed by the Arkansas Department of Education (ADE), which requires students complete at least 22 units for graduation. Students complete regular (core and career focus) courses and exams and may select Advanced Placement classes and exams with opportunities for college credit via AP exam. The school is accredited by the ADE and has been accredited by AdvancED since 1953.

=== Fine Arts ===
Students may participate in various musical and performing arts including: band (e.g., concert band, jazz band), choir (e.g., a cappella, barbershop quartet, beautyshop quartet) and theater (e.g., competitive speech, drama, stagecraft). Visual Arts classes include Art 1, 2 D and 3 D, with Advanced Placement in drawing, 2 D and 3 D studio art, in addition Hazen High School offers Photography 1,2, and 3 with both digital and darkroom experiences. Visual Arts clubs include, Art Club, Illustrators, and National Art Honors.

== Athletics ==
The Hazen High School mascot is the Hornet with the school colors of purple and white

For the 2012–14 seasons, the Hazen Hornets participate in the 2A Classification within the 2A Region 4 Conference as sanctioned by the Arkansas Activities Association with student-athletes competing in football, basketball (boys/girls), cheer, golf (boys/girls), baseball, fastpitch softball, and track and field (boys/girls).
