= Fredonia (Biscoe), Arkansas =

- City
- Location of Fredonia (Biscoe) in Prairie County, Arkansas.
- Coordinates: 34°49′10″N 91°24′37″W
- Country: United States
- State: Arkansas
- County: Prairie

Area
  - Total: 0.95 sq mi (2.47 km^{2})
  - Land: 0.95 sq mi (2.47 km^{2})
  - Water: 0 sq mi (0.00 km^{2})
- Elevation: 190 ft (58 m)

Population (2020)
  - Total: 305
  - Estimate (2025): 294 ▼
  - Density: 319.2/sq mi (123.26/km^{2})
- Time zone: UTC-6 (Central (CST))
  - Summer (DST): UTC-5 (CDT)
- ZIP code: 72017
- FIPS code: 05-25060
- GNIS feature ID: 2406523

Fredonia (Biscoe) is a city in Prairie County, Arkansas, United States. The population was 305 at the 2020 census.

Local myth claimed the town's name "Fredonia" was for the Republic of Fredonia movement of Mexican Texas in the 1820s by a group of Arkansas Cherokee people settled near Nacogdoches, Texas. The settlers backed by white Southerners from the U.S. wanted to establish an independent Native nation but the dream ended in an armed conflict by Mexican troops.

"Biscoe" was the town's official name for most of its history, being written in parentheses. It was founded in the 1810s by several thousand Cherokee settlers from Tennessee in a piece of land set aside for the Western band of Cherokee, who lost their sovereignty when Arkansas became a state in 1836. The town has an African-American majority from a history of slavery in the antebellum era and agricultural labor afterwards.

== Geography ==
According to the United States Census Bureau, the town has a total area of 2.4 km^{2} (0.93 sq mi), all land.

== Demographics ==
Historical population
| Census | Pop. | Note | %± |
|---|---|---|---|
| 1920 | 310 | | — |
| 1930 | 402 | | 29.7% |
| 1940 | 395 | | −1.7% |
| 1950 | 406 | | 2.8% |
| 1960 | 350 | | −13.8% |
| 1970 | 340 | | −2.9% |
| 1980 | 486 | | 42.9% |
| 1990 | 484 | | −0.4% |
| 2000 | 476 | | −1.7% |
| 2010 | 363 | | −23.7% |
| 2020 | 305 | | −16.0% |
| 2025 (est.) | 294 | ▼ | −3.6% |
U.S. Decennial Census; 2014 Estimate

=== 2020 Census ===
Fredonia (Biscoe) town, Arkansas – Racial and ethnic composition Note: the US Census treats Hispanic/Latino as an ethnic category. This table excludes Latinos from the racial categories and assigns them to a separate category. Hispanics/Latinos may be of any race.
| Race / Ethnicity (NH = Non-Hispanic) | Pop 2000 | Pop 2010 | Pop 2020 | % 2000 | % 2010 | % 2020 |
|---|---|---|---|---|---|---|
| White alone (NH) | 197 | 181 | 194 | 41.39% | 49.86% | 63.61% |
| Black or African American alone (NH) | 277 | 178 | 99 | 58.19% | 49.04% | 32.46% |
| Native American or Alaska Native alone (NH) | 0 | 0 | 0 | 0.00% | 0.00% | 0.00% |
| Asian alone (NH) | 0 | 0 | 0 | 0.00% | 0.00% | 0.00% |
| Native Hawaiian or Pacific Islander alone (NH) | 0 | 0 | 0 | 0.00% | 0.00% | 0.00% |
| Other race alone (NH)(NH) | 0 | 0 | 0 | 0.00% | 0.00% | 0.00% |
| Mixed race or Multiracial (NH) | 2 | 0 | 10 | 0.42% | 0.00% | 3.28% |
| Hispanic or Latino (any race) | 0 | 4 | 2 | 0.00% | 1.10% | 0.66% |
| Total | 476 | 363 | 305 | 100.00% | 100.00% | 100.00% |

As of the census of 2000, there were 476 people, 176 households, and 130 families residing in the town. The population density was 197.6 people/km^{2} (512 people/mi^{2}). There were 202 housing units at an average density of 83.9 units/km^{2} (217 units/mi^{2}). The racial makeup of the town was 58.19% Black or African American, 0.42% from two or more races, and 41.39% White.

There were 176 households, out of which 34.7% had children under the age of 18 living with them, 47.7% were married couples living together, 22.2% had a female householder with no husband present, and 26.1% were non-families. 23.9% of all households were made up of individuals, and 13.6% had someone living alone who was 65 years of age or older. The average household size was 2.70 and the average family size was 3.26.

In the town the population was spread out, with 29.6% under the age of 18, 9.7% from 18 to 24, 25.8% from 25 to 44, 18.7% from 45 to 64, and 16.2% who were 65 years of age or older. The median age was 36 years. For every 100 females, there were 104.3 males. For every 100 females age 18 and over, there were 103.0 males.

The median income for a household in the town was $21,406, and the median income for a family was $23,571. Males had a median income of $22,344 versus $14,063 for females. The per capita income for the town was $9,641. About 23.4% of families and 27.0% of the population were below the poverty line, including 34.3% of those under age 18 and 20.0% of those age 65 or over.

== Education ==
Public education for early childhood, elementary and secondary school students is provided from the Hazen School District, which operates Hazen High School.
