= Arkansas Highway 338 =

Highway in Pulaski County, Arkansas, United States

Highway 338

Route information
- Maintained by ArDOT
- Length: 11.49 mi (18.49 km)
- Existed: November 23, 1966–present

Major junctions
- West end: AR 5 in Little Rock
- I-30 / US 67 in Little Rock; I-530 / US 65 / US 167 near Sweet Home
- East end: AR 365 at Sweet Home

Location
- Country: United States
- State: Arkansas
- Counties: Pulaski

Highway system
- Arkansas Highway System; Interstate; US; State; Business; Spurs; Suffixed; Scenic; Heritage
← AR 337	→ AR 339

Arkansas Highway 338 (AR 338) is an east–west state highway in Pulaski County, Arkansas. The highway begins at Highway 5 in Little Rock and runs east, crossing three Interstate highways before terminating at Highway 365 at Sweet Home. It is maintained by the Arkansas Department of Transportation (ArDOT). The designation was also applied to a section of Roosevelt Road in Little Rock near Clinton National Airport between 1973 and 1981.

== Route description ==
Highway 338 begins in the Otter Creek neighborhood in southwest Little Rock at an intersection with Highway 5 (Stagecoach Road). The highway runs due east as Baseline Road through a wooded area, crossing Fourche Creek. The road name derives from the surveying term, as it runs along the baseline established to survey the Louisiana Purchase. It runs underneath Interstate 430 (I-430) without an interchange before a junction with I-30 near the ArDOT headquarters. East of I-30, Highway 338 becomes a four-lane divided highway, with a mixture of residential, commercial and industrial uses. Highway 338 crosses the Union Pacific Railway line via an overpass, and later passes St. Theresa Catholic School and Baseline Elementary School. After passing through a swamp area with bayous and wetlands, the Highway meets Highway 367 (Arch Street) at the Little Rock city limits.

Highway 338 and Highway 367 form a concurrency heading south into unincorporated Pulaski County for 0.9 miles (1.4 km). Highway 338 turns east, becoming Dixon Road, winding as a rural route through Woodyardville prior to an interchange with I-530 and US Highway 65 (US 65). East of I-530, Highway 338 continues through sparsely populated unincorporated area, passing the Pulaski County Special School District Central Office, to Sweet Home, where it terminates.

The ArDOT maintains Highway 338 like all other parts of the state highway system. As a part of these responsibilities, the department tracks the volume of traffic using its roads in surveys using a metric called average annual daily traffic (AADT). ArDOT estimates the traffic level for a segment of roadway for any average day of the year in these surveys. For 2016, the highest traffic levels were estimated between I-30 (22,000 vehicles per day, or VPD) and Stanton Road (19,000 VPD). East of Stanton Road, traffic drops to 13,000 VPD. The Dixon Road segment is sees the highest traffic volume near I-530 with 7,200 VPD, dropping in both directions.

No segment of Highway 338 has been listed as part of the National Highway System, a network of roads important to the nation's economy, defense, and mobility.

== Major intersections ==
The entire route is in Pulaski County.

Location	mi	km	Destinations	Notes
Little Rock	0.00	0.00	AR 5 (Stagecoach Road) – Bryant, Benton	Western terminus; former US 67/US 70
Little Rock	2.21	3.56	I-30 (US 67) – Little Rock, Texarkana	Exit 130 on I-30
	6.40	10.30	AR 367 (Arch Street) – Sheridan, Little Rock	Eastern terminus; former US 167
Gap in route
	0.00	0.00	AR 367 (Arch Street) – Sheridan, Little Rock	Western terminus; former US 167
	2.98	4.80	I-530 (US 65 / US 167) – Little Rock, Pine Bluff	Exit 3 on I-530
Sweet Home	5.09	8.19	AR 365 – Little Rock, Pine Bluff	Eastern terminus; former US 65
1.000 mi = 1.609 km; 1.000 km = 0.621 mi

== History ==
Highway 338 was created by the Arkansas State Highway Commission (ASHC) on November 23, 1966. Created between Highway 5 and Sweet Home, the original routing reflects the present-day alignment. A second segment was designated along a Little Rock city street on June 28, 1973, pursuant to Act 9 of 1973 by the Arkansas General Assembly. The act directed county judges and legislators to designate up to 12 miles (19 km) of county roads as state highways in each county. Following completion of I-440 to the airport, the Roosevelt Road segment of Highway 338 was deleted from the state highway system.

== Former route ==
Highway 338
- Location: Little Rock
- Length: 2.16 mi (3.48 km)
- Existed: June 28, 1973–January 8, 1981

Highway 338 (AR 338, Ark. 338, Hwy. 338, and Roosevelt Road) is a former state highway of 2.16 miles (3.48 km) in Little Rock. It was created in 1973 and deleted in 1981.

Route description

The route started at Highway 365 (Confederate Boulevard) near Little Rock National Cemetery. It ran east along Roosevelt Road to the Little Rock Municipal Airport terminal.

Major intersections

The entire route was in Little Rock, Pulaski County.

mi	km	Destinations	Notes
0.00	0.00	AR 365 (Confederate Boulevard)	Western terminus; former US 65
2.16	3.48	Little Rock Municipal Airport	Eastern terminus
1.000 mi = 1.609 km; 1.000 km = 0.621 mi

== Future ==
Though not entirely within the Little Rock city limits, Highway 338 is entirely within the planning area boundary of the Little Rock Master Street Plan, which was adopted by the city council in 2015. Between the western terminus and I-530, the highway is designated as a principal arterial, except a small segment between Arch Street and Peil Road, which is listed as a minor arterial. A new terrain connection between these points is proposed in the Master Street Plan, which would replace the concurrency along Arch Street.

A proposed extension of Dixon Road to Highway 365 Spur (AR 365S) is also proposed east of the Pulaski County Special School District Central Office. The entire highway is designated as a Class II bike lanes, indicating paved areas on both sides of the roadway for bicycles, delineated by pavement markings.
