= Arkansas Highway 365 =

State highway in Arkansas, U.S.

Highway 365
- Map of Central Arkansas with AR 365 highlighted in red

Route information
- Maintained by ArDOT
- Length: 69.31 mi (111.54 km)

Major junctions
- South end: US 65B / US 79B in Pine Bluff
- I-440 in Little Rock; I-30 / US 65 / US 67 / US 167 in Little Rock; US 70 / AR 367 in Little Rock; I-630 in Little Rock; I-40 / US 65 / AR 176 in North Little Rock; I-40 / US 65 near Maumelle
- North end: US 65B / AR 60 in Conway

Location
- Country: United States
- State: Arkansas
- Counties: Faulkner, Pulaski, Grant, Jefferson

Highway system
- Arkansas Highway System; Interstate; US; State; Business; Spurs; Suffixed; Scenic; Heritage
← AR 364	→ AR 366

Arkansas Highway 365 (AR 365 and Hwy. 365) is a north–south state highway in Central Arkansas. The route of 69.31 miles (111.54 km) runs from US 65B/US 79B in Pine Bluff north through Little Rock to US 65B in Conway. The route is a redesignation of former U.S. Route 65, which has since been rerouted onto various Interstate highways through the area. Portions of Highway 365 in Jefferson County are former alignments of the Dollarway Road, which was the longest paved concrete road upon completion in 1913.

== Route description ==
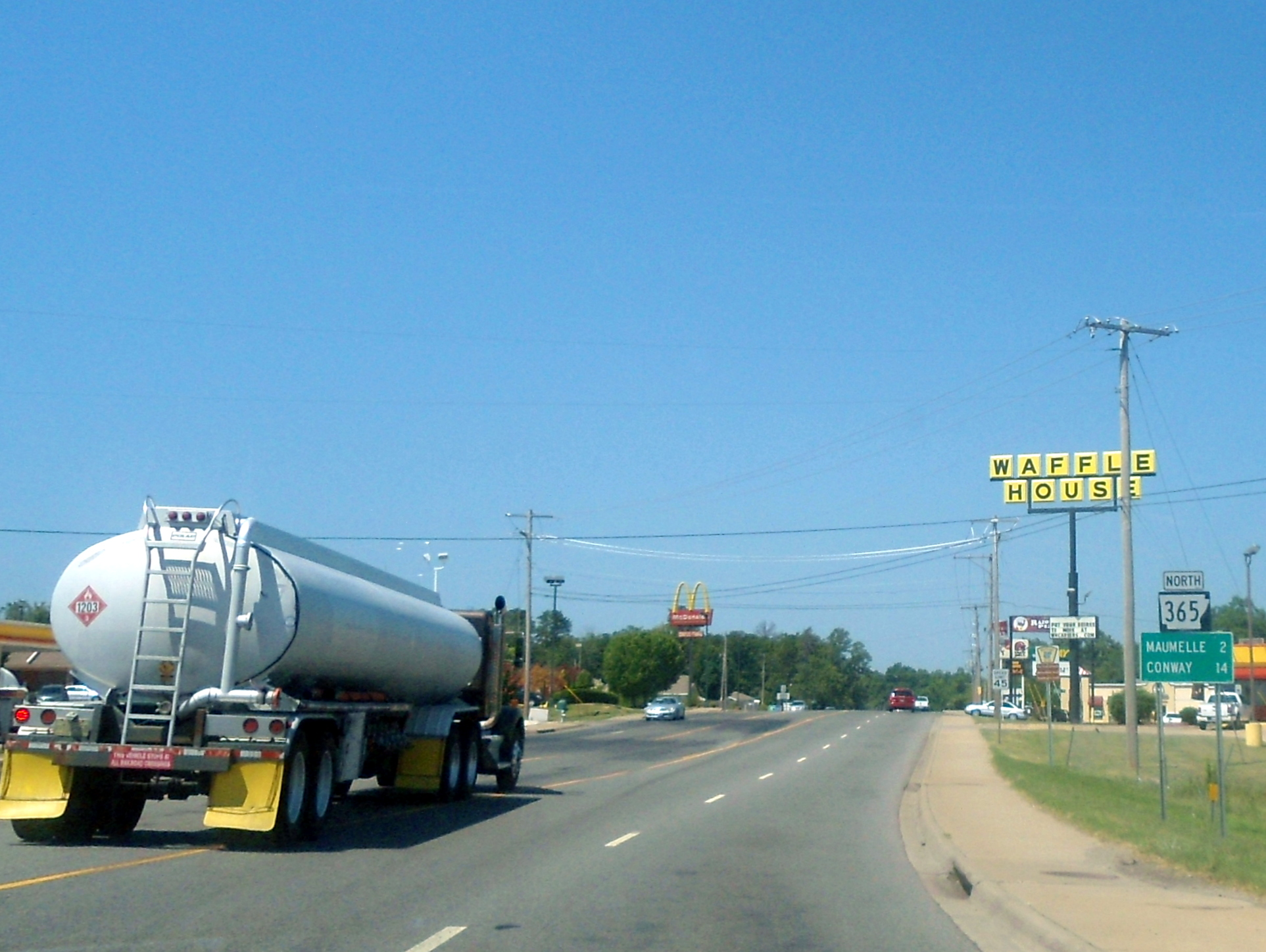
Highway 365 near Maumelle

As a former U.S. Route, the route passes through many historic districts and has many junctions. The route begins at US 65B/US 79B in northwest Pine Bluff near the University of Arkansas at Pine Bluff and runs northwest. Highway 365 is known as Dollarway Road in this part of Pine Bluff as it follows the original routing of the Dollarway Road, a 1913 paving project that gave Jefferson County the longest continuous concrete road in the nation at the time. Highway 365 meets its spur route further northwest, the spur connects Highway 365 to I-530/US 65 and US 270. Now entering White Hall, Highway 365 passes the historic Bellingrath House and intersects Highway 256 near the Pine Bluff Arsenal.

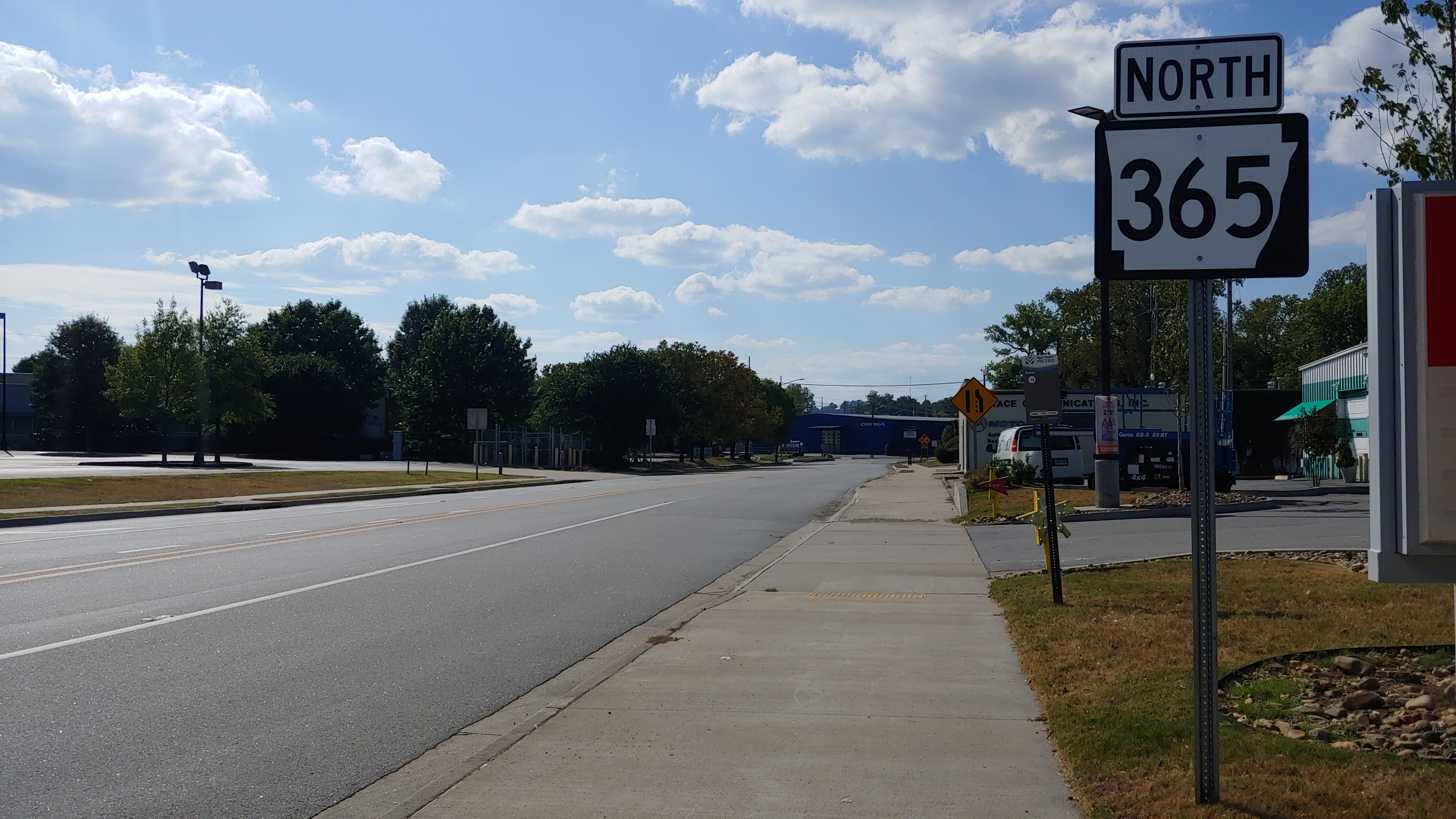
State Highway 365 in North Little Rock, Arkansas looking north.

Further northwest, Highway 365 continues parallel to I-530/US 65 to Redfield where the route passes original Dollarway Pavement. This segment is preserved by its listing on the National Register of Historic Places. The route briefly enters Grant County before entering Pulaski County south of Hensley.

Upon entering Pulaski County, Highway 365 passes through Hensley, Woodson, Wrightsville and Tafton before passing the Hanger Cotton Gin at Sweet Home. The route next enters Little Rock where it junctions with I-440 before becoming turning west onto Roosevelt Road. Highway 365 passes Little Rock National Cemetery before intersecting I-30/US 65/US 67/US 167 at a frontage road interchange. Roosevelt Road serves Main Street before forming a northbound concurrency with US 70 along Broadway Street. This segment of road passes many historic properties in addition to I-630. Highway 365 crosses over the Arkansas River into North Little Rock and breaks from US 70 to the west near Dickey-Stephens Park. Highway 365 passes over the railyard, intersecting Riverfront Drive and becoming Pike Avenue to the north. Highway 365 intersects Interstate 40/US 65 before passing Camp Robinson. The route runs along I-40/US 65 until crossing over near Maumelle. After a junction with Highway 100, Highway 365 continues north along the Arkansas River into Faulkner County. The highway intersects I-40/US 65 and Highway 89 in Mayflower near Lake Conway. Highway 365 continues along I-40/US 65 into south Conway where it terminates at US 65B and Highway 60.

== Major intersections ==
Mile markers reset at some concurrencies. (Note: Although Arkansas highways normally terminate when intersected by a route of greater importance, Highway 365's history as a former alignment of US 65 is reflected when intersecting state highways of a lesser number. Although routes of a lower number and the same class usually take priority at a concurrency, AR 365 still has preference to state routes but not US routes along its path.)

County	Location	mi	km	Destinations	Notes
Jefferson	Pine Bluff	0.00	0.00	US 65B / US 79B (Blake Street) – Camden, Stuttgart, Lake Village	Southern terminus
Jefferson	Pine Bluff	2.07	3.33	AR 365S west (Sheridan Road) to I-530 (US 65) / US 270 west	Eastern terminus of AR 365S; former US 270
Jefferson	White Hall	5.56	8.95	AR 256 (Hoadley Road) to I-530 (US 65) – Jefferson, Little Rock, Pine Bluff Arsenal White Hall Entrance	
Jefferson	Samples	10.00	16.09	AR 104 south to I-530 (US 65)	
Jefferson	Samples	10.07	16.21	To I-530 (US 65)	Access via Gravel Pit Road
Jefferson	Kearney	15.48	24.91	AR 46 east	Southern end of AR 46 concurrency
Jefferson	Redfield	17.61	28.34	AR 46 west (Sheridan Road) to I-530 (US 65)	Northern end of AR 46 concurrency
Grant	No major junctions				
Pulaski	Wrightsville	29.78	47.93	AR 386 east – Dept. of Correction Wrightsville Unit	Western terminus of AR 386
Pulaski	Sweet Home	36.12	58.13	AR 338 west (Dixon Road) to I-530 (US 65 / US 167)	Eastern terminus of AR 338
Pulaski	Little Rock	38.59	62.10	I-440 – Little Rock, Memphis	Exit 1 on I-440
Pulaski	Little Rock	39.59	63.71	I-30 (US 65 / US 67 / US 167) – Little Rock, Pine Bluff, Texarkana	Exit 139A on I-30
Pulaski	Little Rock	40.32	64.89	US 70 west (Roosevelt Road) / AR 367 south (Arch Street)	Southern end of US 70 concurrency; northern terminus of AR 367
Pulaski	see US 70 (mile 149.2–151.4)				
Pulaski	North Little Rock	0.00	0.00	US 70 east (Broadway Street)	Northern end of US 70 concurrency; former US 67 north
Pulaski	North Little Rock			To I-40 east (US 65 east)	Access via Pershing Boulevard
Pulaski	North Little Rock	3.80	6.12	I-40 west (US 65 west) / AR 176 east (Doyle Venable Drive) – Fort Smith	Western terminus of AR 176; exit 152B on I-40
Pulaski		12.70	20.44	I-40 (US 65) – Little Rock, Conway	Exit 142 on I-40
Pulaski		13.42	21.60	AR 100 east (Maumelle Boulevard) – Maumelle	Western terminus of AR 100
Faulkner	Mayflower	22.26	35.82	I-40 (US 65) / AR 89 – Conway, Little Rock	Interchange; exit 135 on I-40
Faulkner	Gold Creek	25.33	40.76	I-40 (US 65) / Baker–Wills Parkway – Fort Smith, Little Rock	Interchange; exit 132 on I-40
Faulkner	Conway	28.99	46.65	US 65B / AR 60 west to I-40 (US 65) / AR 286 east – Little Rock, Toad Suck, Downtown	Interchange; northern terminus; eastern terminus of AR 60
1.000 mi = 1.609 km; 1.000 km = 0.621 mi: Concurrency terminus; Incomplete access

== Pine Bluff spur route ==
Highway 365S
- Location: Pine Bluff
- Length: 2.14 mi (3.44 km)

Arkansas Highway 365 Spur is a 2.14-mile (3.44 km) spur route from White Hall to Pine Bluff. It connects US 270 and I-530 to AR 365. It is a former route of U.S. 270 and its predecessor, Arkansas Highway 6.

== See also ==
- Dollarway Road
- List of state highways in Arkansas
