= Arkansas Highway 100 =

Highway in Arkansas

Highway 100

Route information
- Maintained by ArDOT
- Length: 8.72 mi (14.03 km)
- Existed: December 1, 1987–present

Major junctions
- West end: AR 365 near Maumelle
- I-430 in North Little Rock
- East end: I-40 / US 65 in North Little Rock

Location
- Country: United States
- State: Arkansas

Highway system
- Arkansas Highway System; Interstate; US; State; Business; Spurs; Suffixed; Scenic; Heritage
← AR 99	→ AR 101

Arkansas Highway 100 (AR 100) is a state highway in Central Arkansas.

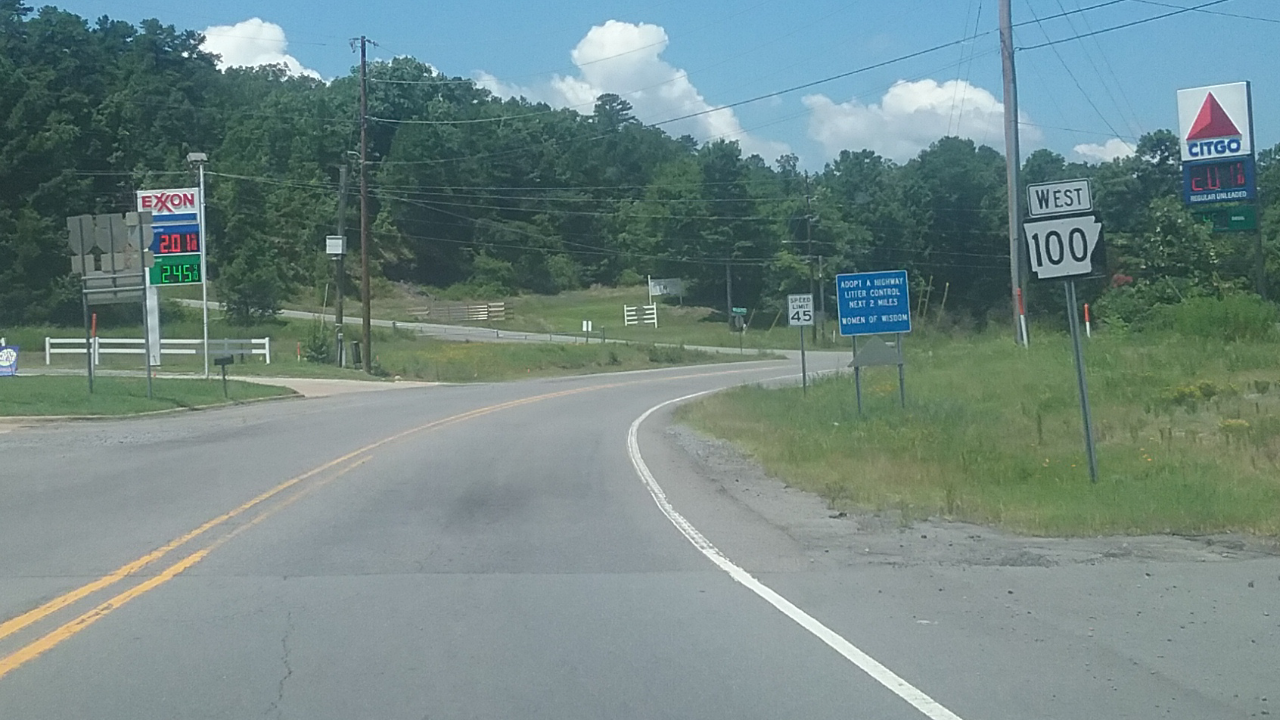
Highway 100 in North Little Rock

== Description ==
A route of 8.72 miles (14.03 km) begins at Highway 365 north of Maumelle and runs east to Interstate 40 (I-40) in North Little Rock. This route was designated in 1987 and is maintained by the Arkansas Department of Transportation (ArDOT).

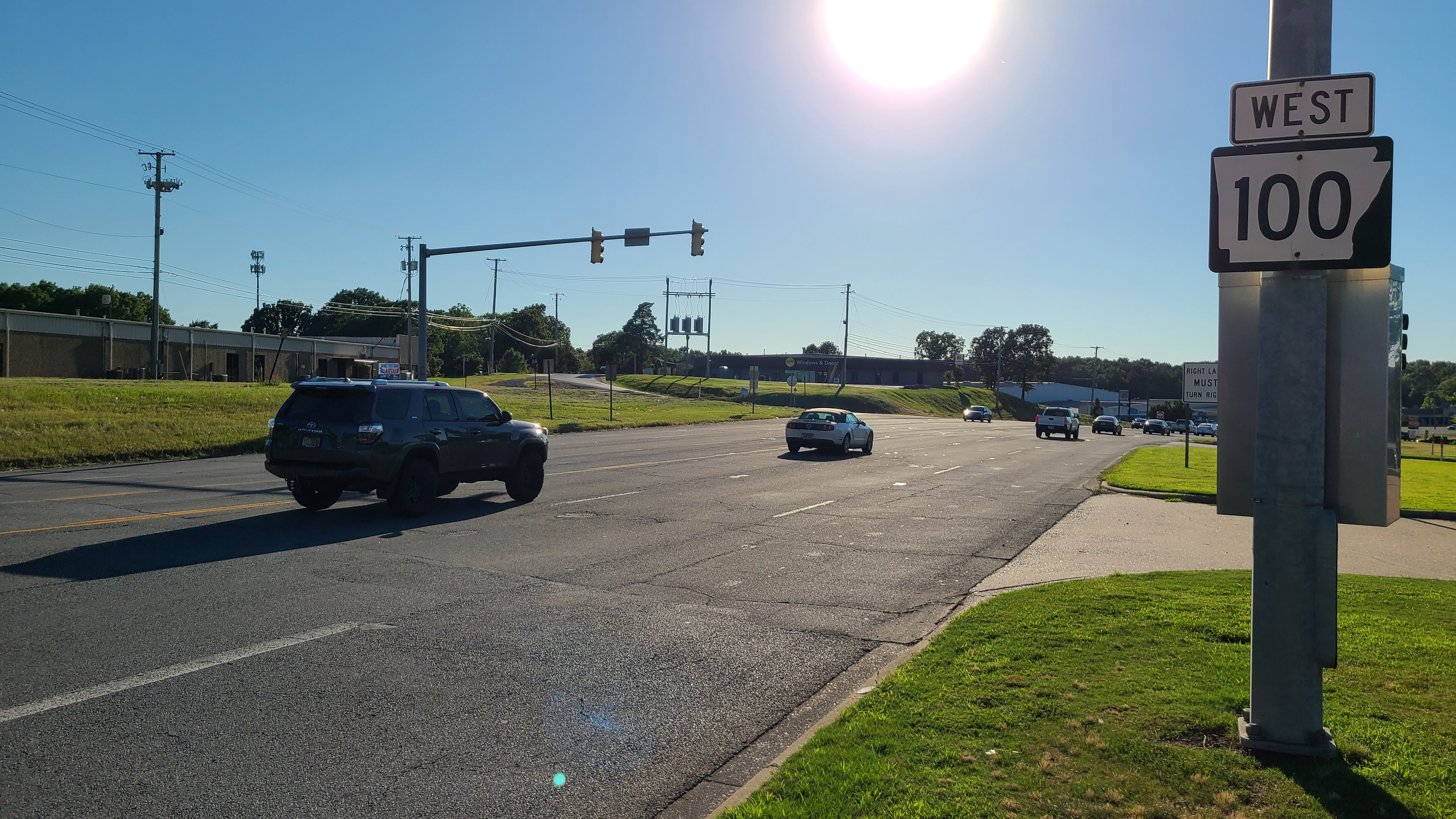
Highway 100 in Maumelle, Arkansas near the interchange with I-430 looking west.

== History ==
The Highway 100 designation was created at the request of the mayor of North Little Rock, who planned to construct Riverside Drive between Rose City and Locust Street, and desired inclusion in the state highway system. The Arkansas State Highway Commission agreed to an alignment in 1965, but the road was not completed for over 20 years. The designation was officially assigned on December 1, 1987, following completion of Riverfront Drive between Highway 365 and Interstate 30 (I-30). The highway was extended east to U.S. Route 70 (US 70) on May 13, 1998.

A second segment was created on May 6, 1987 along Maumelle Boulevard in response to the population growth of Maumelle. The route was extended along Crystal Hill Road to I-40 on August 11, 1993, at the request of concerned citizens, members of the Arkansas General Assembly, and the Pulaski County Judge. The extension was in exchange for removing a segment of Highway 176 near Camp Joseph T. Robinson.

== Major intersections ==
The entire route is in Pulaski County.

Location	mi	km	Destinations	Notes
	0.00	0.00	AR 365 to I-40 (US 65) – Mayflower	Western terminus; former US 65
North Little Rock	6.86	11.04	I-430 to I-40 (US 65) – Little Rock, Memphis	Exit 12 on I-430
North Little Rock	8.72	14.03	I-40 (US 65) to I-430 south – Fort Smith, Conway, Little Rock, Memphis	Eastern terminus; exit 148 on I-40
1.000 mi = 1.609 km; 1.000 km = 0.621 mi

== Former route ==
Highway 100
- Location: North Little Rock
- Length: 1.61 mi (2.59 km)
- Existed: 1987–2019

Another section of Highway 100 previously existed in North Little Rock, and was known locally as "Riverfront Drive". It was initially signed in 1987, and was decommissioned in 2019.
