= Interstate 630 =

Highway in Arkansas

Interstate 630
- I-630 highlighted in red

Route information
- Auxiliary route of I-30
- Maintained by ArDOT
- Length: 7.40 mi (11.91 km)
- Existed: September 30, 1985–present
- NHS: Entire route

Major junctions
- West end: I-430 / Chenal Parkway / Shackleford Road in Little Rock
- US 70 / AR 365 in Little Rock
- East end: I-30 / US 65 / US 67 / US 167 in Little Rock

Location
- Country: United States
- State: Arkansas
- Counties: Pulaski

Highway system
- Interstate Highway System; Main; Auxiliary; Suffixed; Business; Future; Arkansas Highway System; Interstate; US; State; Business; Spurs; Suffixed; Scenic; Heritage
← AR 612	→ AR 642

Interstate 630 (I-630) in Arkansas is an east–west connector within Little Rock. It is also known as the Wilbur D. Mills Freeway and starts at I-430 and Shackleford Road as a continuation of Chenal Parkway, traveling east into downtown Little Rock to I-30.

== Route description ==
The highway connects burgeoning West Little Rock to the downtown core. It feeds into I-430, a north–south route which serves western Little Rock.

== History ==
The project was first conceived in the 1930s and was first planned by the Pulaski County Planning Board in their 1941 report. After having many higher powers deny their plans, construction was started by the city of Little Rock in the 1960s as the East–West Expressway or 8th Street Expressway and was not originally an Interstate or an Arkansas state highway. In the 1970s, US Rep. Wilbur D. Mills was responsible for the route's addition to the Interstate System by rounding down the mileage allocations of all other states, then adding the rounding differences to Arkansas's total; this kept the total nationwide allocation within the original limit of 42,500 miles (68,400 km).

After it was added to the Interstate System, Little Rock initially renamed it for Mills; however, when the Arkansas State Highway Department (AHTD) formally brought it into the state highway system as required by Arkansas law, they removed the name, as their policy at the time prohibited the naming of state highways after individuals. AHTD later changed its policy and readopted the Mills name early in the new millennium. As of autumn 2019, the highway is now named "Gold Star Families Memorial Highway".

== Exit list ==
The entire route is in Little Rock, Pulaski County.

mi	km	Exit	Destinations	Notes
7.40	11.91	–	Chenal Parkway	Continuation west
		8C	I-430 south / Shackleford Road to Markham Street / Kanis Road	Westbound exit and eastbound entrance; exit 6A on I-430
7.3	11.7	8B-A	I-430	Westbound exit and eastbound entrance; signed as exits 8B (north) and 8A (south); exit 6A on I-430
6.82	10.98	7	Baptist Health Drive	No eastbound exit; access to Baptist Health Medical Center – Little Rock
6.25	10.06	6B	Barrow Road	
5.80	9.33	6A	Mississippi Street / Rodney Parham Road	Mississippi Street signed as Mississippi Avenue
5.48	8.82	5	University Avenue	Signed as exits 5B (south) and 5A (north) westbound
5.00	8.05	4	Fair Park Boulevard	
3.80	6.12	3B	Cedar Street / UAMS Boulevard to Pine Street	
2.43	3.91	3A	Woodrow Street	
1.45	2.33	2B	Marshall Street / Dr. Martin Luther King Jr. Drive	No eastbound access to Marshall Street
1.10	1.77	2A	Chester Street	
0.74	1.19	1B	Center Street / Broadway (US 70 / AR 365)	Center Street not signed eastbound
0.46	0.74	1A	Center Street / Main Street	Center Street not signed westbound
0.1	0.16	1	15th Street	Eastbound left exit and westbound entrance
0.00	0.00	139	I-30 / US 65 / US 67 / US 167 – North Little Rock, Texarkana, Downtown Little Rock	Eastern terminus; signed as exits 139B (west) and 139A (east); exit nos. correspond to I-30; exit 139B on I-30
1.000 mi = 1.609 km; 1.000 km = 0.621 mi: Incomplete access
