= Interstate 40 in Arkansas =

Highway in Arkansas

Interstate 40
- I-40 highlighted in red

Route information
- Maintained by ArDOT
- Length: 284.69 mi (458.16 km)
- NHS: Entire route

Major junctions
- West end: I-40 at the Oklahoma state line in Dora
- I-540 / US 71 in Van Buren; I-49 near Alma; I-430 in North Little Rock; I-30 / US 65 / US 67 / US 167 / AR 107 in North Little Rock; I-57 / US 67 / US 167 in North Little Rock; I-440 in North Little Rock; I-55 / US 61 / US 64 / US 78 / US 79 in West Memphis
- East end: I-40 at the Tennessee state line in West Memphis

Location
- Country: United States
- State: Arkansas
- Counties: Crawford, Franklin, Johnson, Pope, Conway, Faulkner, Pulaski, Lonoke, Prairie, Monroe, St. Francis, Crittenden

Highway system
- Interstate Highway System; Main; Auxiliary; Suffixed; Business; Future; Arkansas Highway System; Interstate; US; State; Business; Spurs; Suffixed; Scenic; Heritage
← AR 39	→ AR 40

Interstate 40 (I-40) is an east–west Interstate Highway that has a 284.69-mile (458.16 km) section in the U.S. state of Arkansas, connecting Oklahoma to Tennessee. The route enters Arkansas from the west just north of the Arkansas River near Dora. It travels eastward across the northern portion of the state, connecting the cities of Fort Smith, Clarksville, Russellville, Morrilton, Conway, North Little Rock, Forrest City, and West Memphis. I-40 continues into Tennessee, heading through Memphis. The highway has major junctions with I-540 at Van Buren (the main highway connecting to Fort Smith), I-49 at Alma (the main highway connecting to Fayetteville and Bentonville), I-30 and I-57 in North Little Rock, and I-55 to Blytheville.

For the majority of its routing through Arkansas, I-40 follows the historic alignment of two separate U.S. Highways. From Oklahoma to Little Rock, I-40 generally follows U.S. Highway 64 through the Ozark Mountains. East of Little Rock, the route generally follows the routing of US 70 until the Tennessee state line.

== Route description ==
=== Oklahoma state line to North Little Rock ===
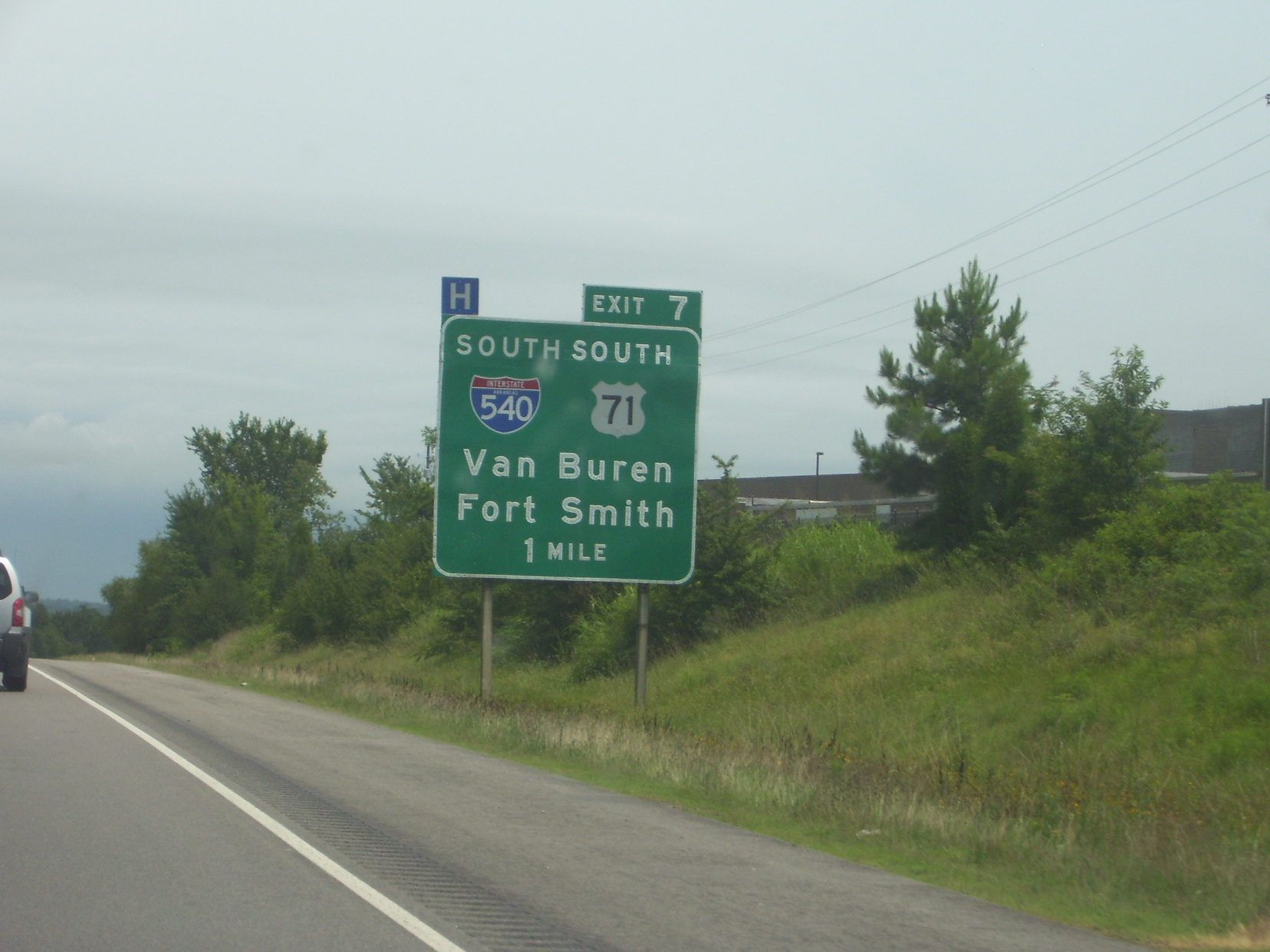
I-540/US 71 run south from I-40 at exit 7 in Van Buren, providing access to the larger city of Fort Smith.

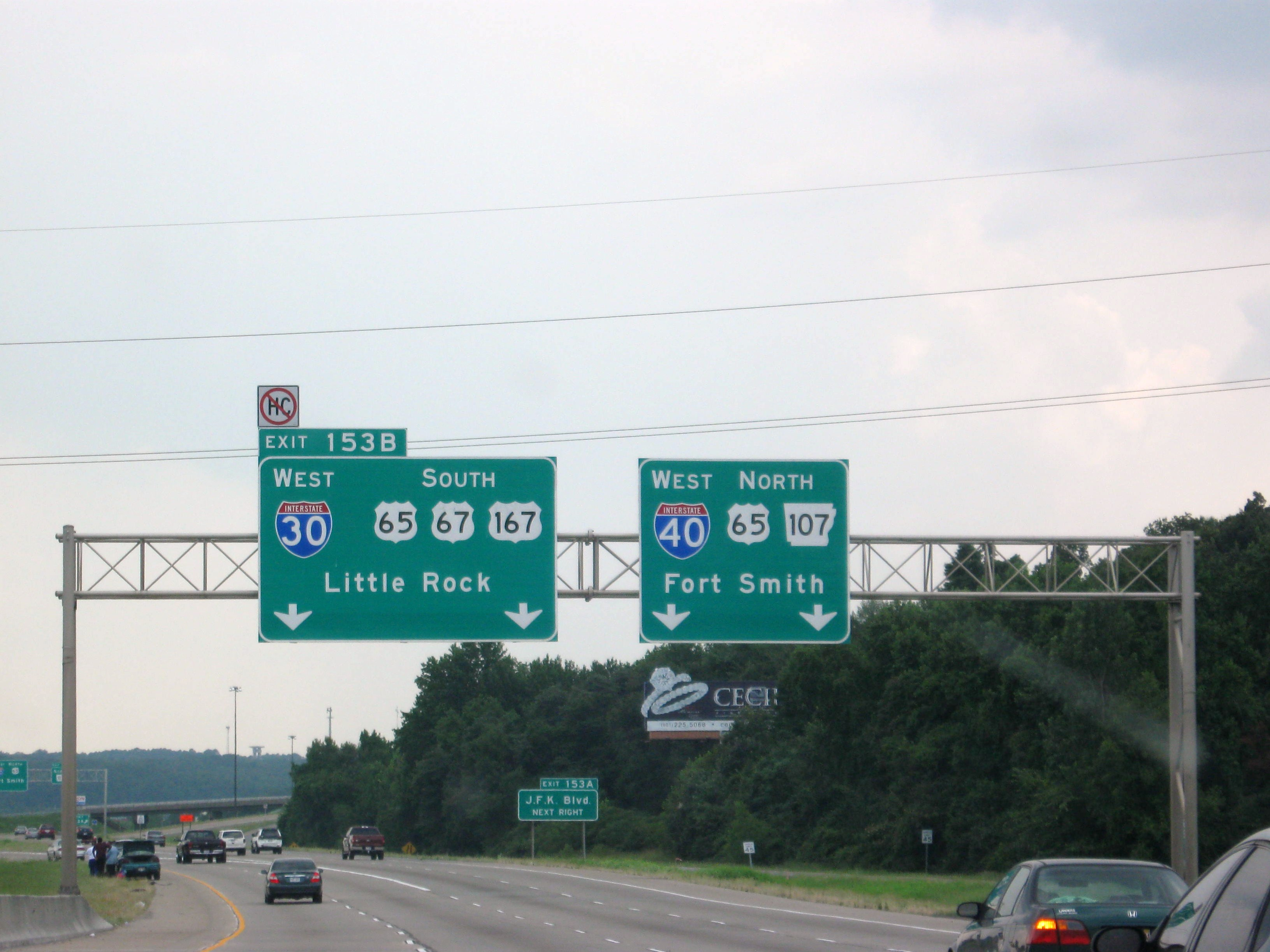
I-30 begins at I-40/US 65/AR 107 and runs south at I-30/US 65/US 67/US 167.

I-40 enters Arkansas from Oklahoma at Dora in Crawford County. It heads east into Van Buren, giving access to Fort Smith as well across the Arkansas River to the south. Access is primarily via I-540/US 71, which was built as a southern spur to Fort Smith in the 1970s. I-40 overlaps with US 71, forming a concurrency until the alignment of I-49 breaks north to Fayetteville, Springdale, Rogers, Bentonville, and its northern Arkansas terminus in Bella Vista, with US 71 breaking away shortly afterward at another interchange. The route continues to parallel US 64 into the Ozark Mountains by entering Franklin County and providing access to the Pig Trail Scenic Byway in Ozark. I-40 runs through Clarksville (where it has a junction with US 64), passes over part of Lake Dardanelle, and meets Highway 7 (AR 7) in Russellville. I-40 continues to the east through Morrilton before turning south to Conway and Faulkner County. In Conway, I-40 forms a concurrency with US 65 at exit 125, which continues until exit 153A in North Little Rock. The highway also has another junction with US 64 and U.S. Highway 65 Business (US 65B) in Conway before passing Lake Conway and entering the Little Rock metropolitan area.

=== North Little Rock to the Tennessee state line ===
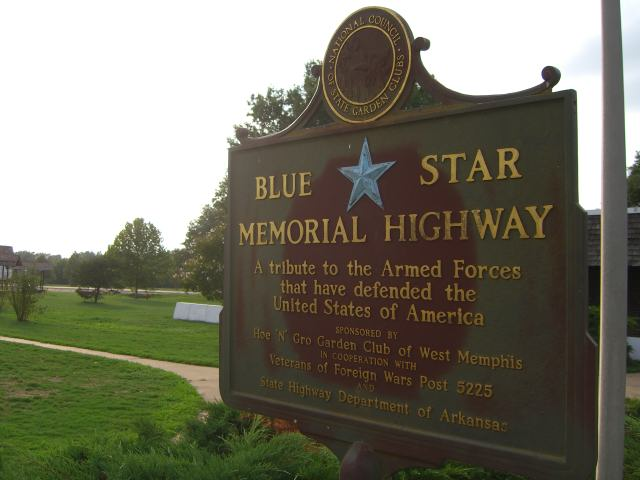
In West Memphis, Arkansas, I-40 is designated as a Blue Star Memorial Highway.

Now in Pulaski County, I-40 heads toward the south-southeast as it heads to the town of Maumelle. It continues toward this direction until it reaches I-430, which provides access along the westside of Little Rock. Further southeast near the Arkansas River, the route has a high volume interchange as the northern terminus of I-30 as well as concurrent routes with US 67/US 167; US 65 turns south at this intersection, breaking the concurrency formed in Conway. I-40 (now concurrent with US 67 and US 167) continues east for 1.5 miles (2.4 km) before the latter two routes branch off to the northeast with I-57. From this point onward, I-40 begins to parallel US 70 rather than US 64, which was a more or less a parallel route until Conway. The Interstate continues to the east to intersect I-440 before entering Lonoke County. Passing through Lonoke, the route runs through rural Arkansas with straight alignments and relatively few junctions, forming an overlap with US 63 in Hazen until meeting US 49/AR 17 in Brinkley. Upon entering St. Francis County, I-40 runs northeast to Forrest City, where it intersects with AR 1. Continuing northeast, I-40 enters Crittenden County, where it intersects with US 79 at Shearerville and enters West Memphis.

The highway continues to the northeast to an interchange with I-55, and the two routes form a concurrency east for 3.1 miles (5.0 km). I-40 continues east onto the Hernando de Soto Bridge over the Mississippi River. The Tennessee state line is at the midpoint of the river, and Memphis, Tennessee, begins at the eastside of the bridge.

== Exit list ==
County	Location	mi	km	Exit	Destinations	Notes
Crawford	Dora	0.00	0.00		I-40 west – Oklahoma City	Continuation into Oklahoma
Crawford	Dora	0.03– 0.70	0.048– 1.13	1	Dora, Fort Smith	Westbound exit and eastbound entrance; access via Dora Road
Crawford	Van Buren	3.12	5.02	3	Lee Creek Road	
Crawford	Van Buren	5.26	8.47	5	AR 59 – Van Buren, Siloam Springs	
Crawford	Van Buren	7.35	11.83	7	I-540 south / US 71 south – Van Buren, Fort Smith	Western end of US 71 concurrency; trumpet interchange; northern terminus and exits 1B-A on I-540
Crawford		12.26	19.73	12	I-49 north – Fayetteville	Current southern terminus and exits 20A-B on I-49; tri-stack interchange; former I-540
Crawford	Alma	13.25	21.32	13	US 71 north / US 71B south – Alma	Eastern end of US 71 concurrency; US 71B not signed
Crawford	Mulberry	20.00	32.19	20	Dyer, Mulberry	Access via Georgia Ridge Drive
Crawford	Mulberry	23.95	38.54	24	AR 215 – Mulberry	
Franklin	Ozark	34.52	55.55	35	AR 23 – Ozark, Huntsville	
Franklin	Ozark	37.26	59.96	37	AR 219 – Ozark	
Franklin	Wiederkehr Village	40.83	65.71	41	AR 186 – Altus	
Johnson		46.40	74.67	47	AR 164 – Hartman, Coal Hill	
Johnson	Clarksville	54.70	88.03	55	US 64 to AR 109 south – Hartman, Scranton, Clarksville	
Johnson	Clarksville	57.01	91.75	57	Crawford Street	
Johnson	Clarksville	58.05	93.42	58	AR 103 to AR 21 north – Clarksville	
Johnson	Lamar	63.68	102.48	64	US 64 – Lamar	
Johnson	Knoxville	66.47	106.97	67	AR 315 – Knoxville	
Pope	London	73.84	118.83	74	AR 333 – London	
Pope	London	77.61	124.90	78	US 64 – Russellville	
Pope	Russellville	80.90	130.20	81	AR 7 (Arkansas Avenue) – Russellville	
Pope	Russellville	82.99	133.56	83	AR 124 (Weir Road)	Former AR 326
Pope	Russellville	83.97	135.14	84	AR 331 south to US 64 – Russellville	Northern terminus of AR 331
Pope	Pottsville	87.99	141.61	88	US 64 / AR 247 south / AR 363 north – Pottsville	US 64/AR 363 not signed
Pope	Atkins	93.71	150.81	94	AR 105 / AR 363 west – Atkins	AR 363 not signed
Conway		100.53	161.79	101	Blackwell	Access via Fishlake Road
Conway	Morrilton	106.33	171.12	107	AR 95 – Morrilton	
Conway	Morrilton	107.83	173.54	108	AR 9 – Morrilton	
Conway	Plumerville	112.33	180.78	112	AR 92 – Plumerville	
Conway	Menifee	117.37	188.89	117	Menifee	Access via Harding A. Byrd Road
Faulkner	Conway	123.40	198.59	124	AR 25 (Salem Road) – Conway, Wooster	Signed as exits 124B (south) and 124A (north) westbound
Faulkner	Conway	124.94	201.07	125	US 65 north / US 65B south – Greenbrier, Harrison, Conway	Western end of US 65 concurrency; northern terminus of US 65B
Faulkner	Conway	126.59	203.73	127	US 64 – Vilonia, Conway, Beebe	
Faulkner	Conway	128.53	206.85	129	US 65B north / AR 286 east (Dave Ward Drive) to AR 60 west	Signed as exits 129A (east) and 129B (north) westbound; southern terminus of US 65B; western terminus of AR 286
Faulkner	Gold Creek	132.14	212.66	132	AR 365 / Baker–Wills Parkway	AR 365 not signed
Faulkner	Mayflower	135.27	217.70	135	AR 89 / AR 365 – Mayflower	
Pulaski		142.17	228.80	142	AR 365 – Morgan, Maumelle	Former routing of US 65
Pulaski		145.95	234.88	146	White Oak Crossing	
Pulaski	North Little Rock	147.18– 147.42	236.86– 237.25	147	I-430 south – Texarkana	Northern terminus and exits 13A-B on I-430
Pulaski	North Little Rock	148.01	238.20	148	AR 100 west (Crystal Hill Road)	Eastern terminus of AR 100
Pulaski	North Little Rock	150.16	241.66	150	Burns Park	Access via Military Road
Pulaski	North Little Rock	151.85	244.38	152B	AR 176 east / AR 365 (MacArthur Drive / Pike Avenue) – Levy	No eastbound entrance; signed as exit 152 eastbound; AR 176 not signed
Pulaski	North Little Rock	151.91	244.48	152A	To AR 176 east (Camp Robinson Road) – Levy	Westbound exit and eastbound entrance; access via Pike Avenue
Pulaski	North Little Rock	152.70– 153.02	245.75– 246.26	153A	AR 107 north (JFK Boulevard)	Southern terminus of AR 107
Pulaski	North Little Rock	152.70– 153.02	245.75– 246.26	153B	I-30 west / US 65 south / US 67 south / US 167 south – Little Rock	Eastern end of US 65 concurrency; western end of US 67/US 167 concurrency; eastern terminus of I-30
Pulaski	North Little Rock	154.11	248.02	154	North Hills Boulevard	Eastbound exit and westbound entrance
Pulaski	North Little Rock	154.61	248.82	155	I-57 north / US 67 north / US 167 north – St. Louis, Jacksonville, Little Rock AFB	Eastern end of US 67/US 167 concurrency; southern terminus of I-57
Pulaski	North Little Rock	155.55	250.33	156	Springhill Drive – Baptist Health Medical Center-NLR	
Pulaski	North Little Rock	156.32	251.57	157	Protho Junction	Access via Jacksonville Highway; former AR 161
Pulaski	North Little Rock	158.73	255.45	159	I-440 – Jacksonville, Texarkana	Signed as exits 159A (west) and 159B (east) eastbound; exits 11A-B on I-440
Pulaski	North Little Rock	160.60	258.46	161	AR 391 south – Galloway	Northern terminus of AR 391
Lonoke		164.58	264.87	165	Kerr Road	
Lonoke		168.35	270.93	169	AR 15 (Remington Road)	
Lonoke	Lonoke	172.87	278.21	173	AR 89 – Lonoke	
Lonoke	Lonoke	174.35	280.59	175	AR 31 – Lonoke, Beebe	
Lonoke	Carlisle	182.25	293.30	183	AR 13 – Carlisle	
Prairie	Hazen	192.93	310.49	193	US 63 south / AR 11 north – Hazen, Des Arc	Western end of US 63 concurrency; southern terminus of AR 11
Prairie		201.91	324.94	202	AR 33 – Biscoe, De Valls Bluff	
Monroe	Brinkley	215.42	346.68	216	US 49 / US 63 north to AR 17 north – Brinkley, Cotton Plant	Eastern end of US 63 concurrency
St. Francis	Wheatley	220.70	355.18	221	AR 78 – Wheatley, Marianna	
St. Francis	Palestine	232.88	374.78	233	AR 261 – Palestine	
St. Francis		238.72	384.18	239	AR 1 – Wynne, Marianna	
St. Francis	Forrest City	240.40	386.89	241	AR 1B – Forrest City, Wynne	Signed as exits 241A (south) and 241B (north)
St. Francis	Forrest City	241.42	388.53	242	AR 284 (Crowley's Ridge Road)	
St. Francis		246.70	397.03	247	AR 38 east – Hughes, Widener	Western terminus of AR 38
St. Francis		255.86	411.77	256	AR 75 (US 70) – Parkin	
St. Francis		259.51	417.64	260	AR 149 – Earle	
Crittenden	Jennette	264.67	425.95	265	US 79 south / AR 218 – Jennette, Hughes	Western end of US 79 concurrency
Crittenden	Lehi	270.78	435.78	271	AR 147 (US 70) – Lehi, Horseshoe Lake	
Crittenden	West Memphis	274.81	442.26	275	AR 118 (College Boulevard)	
Crittenden	West Memphis	276.14	444.40	276	Rich Road to AR 77 (Missouri Street)	Eastbound exit only; access to AR 77 via South Service Road
Crittenden	West Memphis	276.70	445.31	277	I-55 north / US 61 north / US 64 west / US 78 west – Blytheville, Jonesboro, St. Louis	Western end of I-55/US 61/US 64/US 78 concurrency; exit 8 on I-55
Crittenden	West Memphis	277.22	446.14	278	AR 77 (Missouri Street) / AR 191 (7th Street)	
Crittenden	West Memphis	279.11	449.18	5	Ingram Boulevard	Exit no. corresponds to I-55
Crittenden	West Memphis	279.37	449.60	279B	I-55 south – Memphis, Jackson, MS	Eastbound exit and westbound entrance; eastern end of I-55/US 61/US 64/US 78/US 79 concurrency
Crittenden	West Memphis	278.97	448.96	279A	Ingram Boulevard	
Crittenden	West Memphis	280.18	450.91	280	Dr. Martin Luther King Jr. Drive (AR 38 south)	
Crittenden	West Memphis	280.68	451.71	281	AR 131 (Mound City Road)	Westbound exit and eastbound entrance
Mississippi River		284.03	457.10	Hernando de Soto Bridge		
Mississippi River		284.03	457.10		I-40 east – Memphis, Nashville	Continuation into Tennessee
1.000 mi = 1.609 km; 1.000 km = 0.621 mi: Concurrency terminus; Incomplete access

Interstate 40
Previous state: Oklahoma	Arkansas	Next state: Tennessee
