= Amboy Overpass =

- Formerly listed on the U.S. National Register of Historic Places
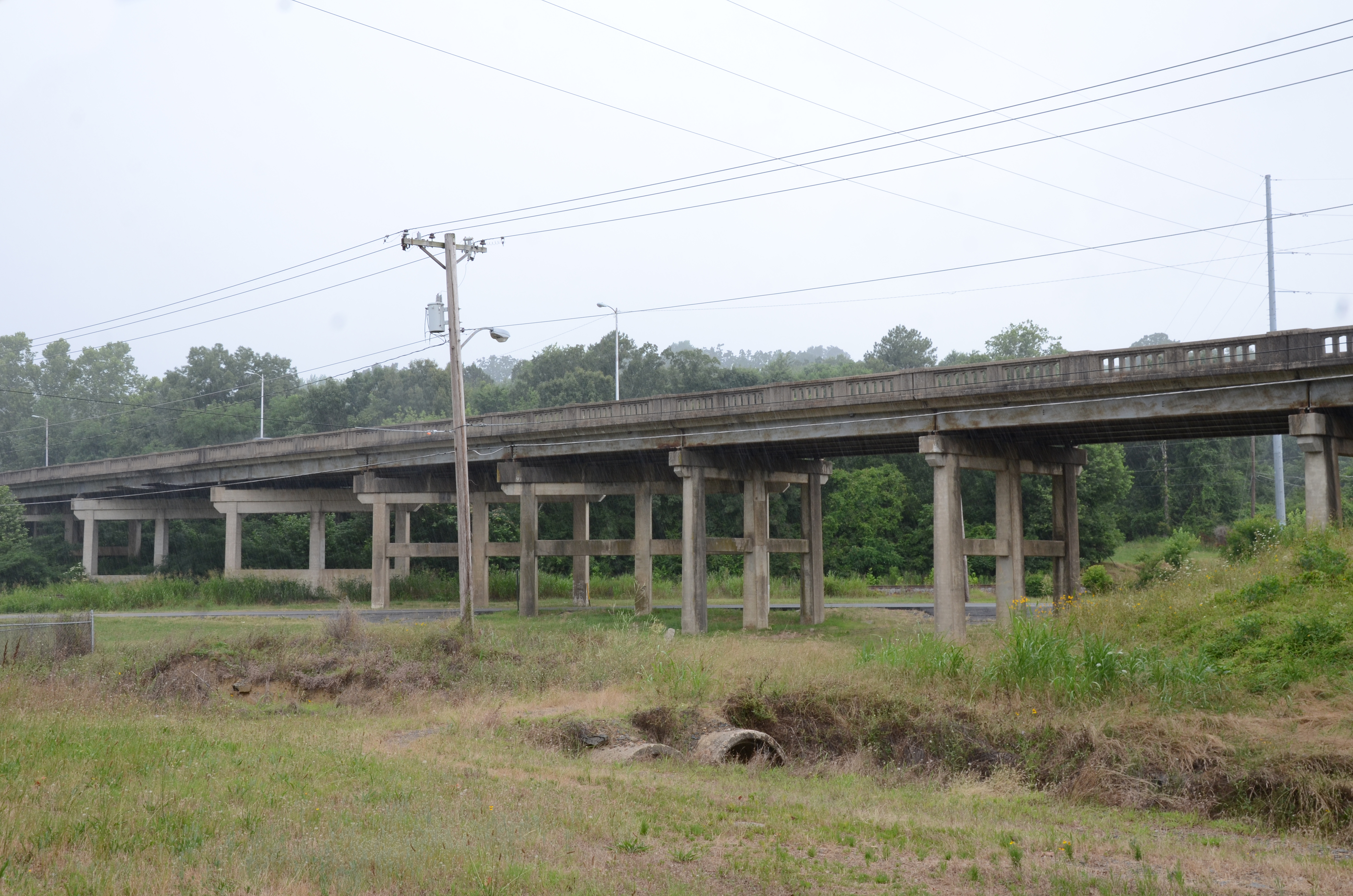

- Location within Arkansas Location within the United States
- Location: AR 365 over Union Pacific RR tracks, N of jct. of AR 365 and AR 176, North Little Rock, Arkansas
- Coordinates: 34°48′5″N 92°17′30″W
- Area: less than one acre
- Built: 1941
- Architect: Federal Works Agency, Public Roads Administration
- Demolished: 2017
- MPS: Historic Bridges of Arkansas MPS
- NRHP reference No.: 95000608

Significant dates
- Added to NRHP: May 18, 1995
- Removed from NRHP: September 1, 2022

The Amboy Overpass was a historic bridge in North Little Rock, Arkansas. Built in 1941, it carried MacArthur Drive (Arkansas Highway 365) across the railroad tracks of the Union Pacific Railroad in the northwestern part of the city. It was a twelve-span structure with a total length of 573 feet (175 m), whose longest span was 80 feet (24 m). The carrying piers and abutments were all fashioned out of reinforced concrete, and a concrete balustrade ran along each side of the deck. Due to structural deficiencies, the bridge was demolished and replaced by a new bridge in 2017.

The bridge was listed on the National Register of Historic Places in 1995, and was delisted in 2022.

== See also ==
- National Register of Historic Places listings in Pulaski County, Arkansas
- List of bridges on the National Register of Historic Places in Arkansas
