= Interstate 430 =

Highway in Arkansas

Interstate 430
- I-430 highlighted in red

Route information
- Auxiliary route of I-30
- Maintained by ArDOT
- Length: 12.93 mi (20.81 km)
- Existed: early 1980s–present
- NHS: Entire route

Major junctions
- South end: I-30 / US 67 / US 70 in Little Rock
- I-630 / Chenal Parkway in Little Rock
- North end: I-40 / US 65 in North Little Rock

Location
- Country: United States
- State: Arkansas
- Counties: Pulaski

Highway system
- Interstate Highway System; Main; Auxiliary; Suffixed; Business; Future; Arkansas Highway System; Interstate; US; State; Business; Spurs; Suffixed; Scenic; Heritage
← US 425	→ I-440

Interstate 430 (I-430) is a 12.93-mile-long (20.81 km) Interstate highway in Pulaski County, Arkansas, that bypasses the cities of Little Rock and North Little Rock. I-430 begins at an interchange southwest of Downtown Little Rock with I-30 and travels north to cross the Arkansas River and end at I-40. The first plans for the freeway appeared in 1955.

== Route description ==
I-430 starts its 12.93-mile (20.81 km) route at a trumpet interchange with I-30/US 67/US 70. From the interchange, US 70 joins I-430 as it travels northwest and passes over Highway 338 (Baseline Road) before having a diamond interchange with Highway 5 (Stagecoach Road). At the interchange, US 70 splits off onto Stagecoach Road to the east, with Highway 5 running west. I-430 goes north to pass Remington College and intersect Highway 300 (Colonel Glenn Road) before curving eastward to intersect Shackleford Road and then turning back north. Immediately after passing under Kanis Road, the highway has a cloverleaf interchange with I-630 at its western terminus. After I-630, the roadway goes past Immanuel Baptist Church and Breckenridge Village to intersect Rodney Parham Road near the Colony West Shopping Center and later Highway 10 (Cantrell Road). The Highway 10 interchange is the final I-430 interchange before the freeway crosses the Arkansas River on the I-430 Bridge. After the bridge, the roadway passes Rosenbaum Lake and intersects with Highway 100 (Crystal Hill Road) before ending at a three-way interchange with I-40/US 65.

== History ==
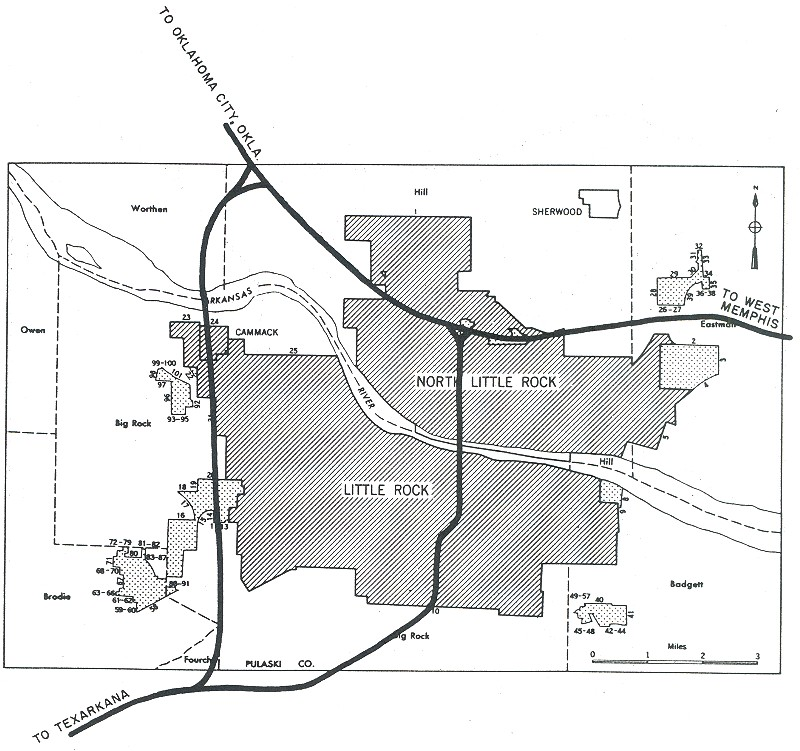
1955 plan for I-430 and other Little Rock freeways

Early plans for the Interstate Highway System include a route along roughly the same alignment as the present I-30 through the Little Rock area but are not detailed enough to show exactly how the cities would be served. Later, in 1955, a map of the Interstate Highway's plans shows a complete beltway around Little Rock, including present-day I-430 and I-440. When preliminary urban routes were laid out in 1955, the beltway was shortened to the current route of I-430.

The American Association of State Highway and Transportation Officials (AASHTO) rerouted US 70 onto a portion of I-430 in May 2021 as part of a US 70 rerouting across Little Rock.

== Exit list ==
The entire route is in Pulaski County.

Location	mi	km	Exit	Destinations	Notes
Little Rock	0.00	0.00	129	I-30 (US 67 / US 70 west) – Little Rock, Texarkana	Southern terminus; southern end of US 70 concurrency; signed as exits 129A (east) and 129B (west); exit nos. correspond to I-30
Little Rock	0.19	0.31	128	Mabelvale West Road / Otter Creek Road / Bass Pro Parkway	Southbound exit and northbound entrance; exit no. corresponds to I-30
Little Rock	1.25	2.01	1	US 70 east / AR 5 south (Stagecoach Road)	Northern end of US 70 concurrency; northern terminus of AR 5
Little Rock	3.59	5.78	4	AR 300 east (Colonel Glenn Road)	Western terminus of AR 300
Little Rock	5.34	8.59	5	Shackleford Road to Kanis Road	
Little Rock	6.30	10.14	6	I-630 east / Chenal Parkway to Baptist Health Drive / Markham Street – Downtown	Signed as exits 6A (I-630) and 6B (Chenal); exits 8C-A on I-630; access to Markham Street via Shackleford Road
Little Rock	7.70	12.39	8	Rodney Parham Road	
Little Rock	9.06	14.58	9	AR 10 (Cantrell Road)	
North Little Rock	11.63	18.72	12	AR 100 (Crystal Hill Road) to Maumelle Boulevard	
North Little Rock	12.83	20.65	13	I-40 / US 65 – Fort Smith, Memphis, Oklahoma City	Northern terminus; signed as exits 13A (east) and 13B (west); exit 147 on I-40
1.000 mi = 1.609 km; 1.000 km = 0.621 mi: Concurrency terminus; Incomplete access
