= Arkansas Highway 176 =

State highway in Arkansas, United States

Highway 176
- AR 176 in red, AR 176Y in blue

Route information
- Maintained by ArDOT

Section 1
- Length: 2.0 mi (3.2 km)
- West end: I-40 / US 65 / AR 365 in North Little Rock
- East end: Remount Road in North Little Rock

Section 2
- Length: 3.2 mi (5.1 km)
- West end: AR 107 in Sherwood
- East end: I-57 / US 67 / US 167 / Rixie Road in Sherwood

Location
- Country: United States
- State: Arkansas
- Counties: Pulaski

Highway system
- Arkansas Highway System; Interstate; US; State; Business; Spurs; Suffixed; Scenic; Heritage
← AR 175	→ AR 177

Arkansas Highway 176 (AR 176) is a designation for two state highways in Central Arkansas. One segment of 2.0 miles (3.2 km) runs in North Little Rock from Interstate 40 (I-40) north to Remount Road. A second segment of 3.2 miles (5.1 km) runs in Sherwood from Highway 107 east to I-57. Highway 176 also has a spur route (signed as Highway 176Y), which intersects I-57 southbound.

== Route description ==
=== North Little Rock ===
Highway 176 begins at I-40 (via exit 152B westbound) and Highway 365 in North Little Rock, in the Levy subdivision. The route heads north, before intersecting Camp Robinson Road. Highway 176 follows Camp Robinson Road for about two miles (3.2 km), with state maintenance ending at Remount Road.

=== Sherwood ===
The route begins at Highway 107 in Sherwood. Highway 176 heads east for about three miles (4.8 km) before intersecting I-57/US 67/US 167. The route ends at Rixie Road in Sherwood, shortly after an interchange with I-57. Highway 176 itself is locally referred to as Kiehl Avenue for its entire length.

== Major intersections ==
The entire route is in Pulaski County.

Location	mi	km	Destinations	Notes
North Little Rock	0.0	0.0	I-40 west (US 65 north) / AR 365 – North Little Rock	Western terminus; exit 152B on I-40
North Little Rock	0.3	0.48	To I-40 east (US 65 south)	Access via Camp Robinson Road
North Little Rock	2.0	3.2	Remount Road	Eastern terminus
Gap in route
Sherwood	0.0	0.0	AR 107 – Sherwood, North Little Rock	Western terminus
Sherwood	2.3	3.7	AR 176Y south to I-57 south / US 67 south / US 167 south – Little Rock	Northern terminus of AR 176Y
Sherwood	3.1	5.0	I-57 / US 67 / US 167 – Little Rock, Jacksonville	Exit 5 on I-57
Sherwood	3.2	5.1	Rixie Road	Eastern terminus
1.000 mi = 1.609 km; 1.000 km = 0.621 mi

== Spur route ==
Highway 176Y
- Location: Sherwood
- Length: 0.38 mi (610 m)

Arkansas Highway 176Y (AR 176Y) is a very short spur route which connects Highway 176 with I-57's southbound frontage road. The route is accessible via exit 4 northbound.
