= Interstate 440 (Arkansas) =

Highway in Arkansas

Interstate 440
- I-440 highlighted in red

Route information
- Maintained by ArDOT
- Length: 14.16 mi (22.79 km)
- History: Last completed in 2003
- NHS: Entire route

Major junctions
- West end: I-30 / US 65 / US 67 / US 167 / I-530 in Little Rock
- US 165 in North Little Rock; US 70 in North Little Rock; I-40 in North Little Rock
- East end: I-57 / US 67 / US 167 in Jacksonville

Location
- Country: United States
- State: Arkansas
- Counties: Pulaski

Highway system
- Interstate Highway System; Main; Auxiliary; Suffixed; Business; Future; Arkansas Highway System; Interstate; US; State; Business; Spurs; Suffixed; Scenic; Heritage
← I-430	→ AR 463

Interstate 440 (I-440) forms a partial freeway loop of 14.16 miles (22.79 km) in Arkansas, connecting I-57 and I-40 with I-30 and I-530 in Little Rock. I-440, known as the East Belt Freeway during planning and construction, travels through much of the area's industrial core in the eastern part of the metropolitan area, near Clinton National Airport and the Port of Little Rock. North of I-40, the route continues until it reaches I-57 in Jacksonville. This section is known as the North Belt Freeway.

== Route description ==
I-440 begins at I-30 at a large interchange with I-530. After this interchange, I-440 intersects Highway 365 (Springer Boulevard) and Bankhead Drive near Clinton National Airport (formerly Little Rock National Airport). The highway continues across Lindsey Road northeast to cross the Arkansas River. I-440 has interchanges with US 165 and US 70 before meeting I-40. On the northside of I-40, I-440 runs northeast to Jacksonville, connecting North Little Rock's easternmost neighborhoods with I-57/US 67/US 167. There are ghost ramps at the terminus. At the time of opening, this segment was designated Highway 440, but was redesignated as I-440 when I-57 was designated along US 67 on November 7, 2024.

To avoid repeating the disturbance of the Fourche Creek floodplain by a causeway section of I-30 (including what is now the I-30/I-440/I-530 interchange), most of I-440 between I-30 and the exit leading to the airport is an extended bridge through the floodplain, crossing Fourche Creek several times.

== History ==
Highway 440
- Location: North Little Rock–Jacksonville
- Existed: 2003–August 19, 2025

The idea of I-440 was first proposed in 1941.

I-440 is part of a planned full loop around the metropolitan area, together with I-430. Part of that effort, an extended route from I-440's east end at I-40 to US 67/US 167, opened in 2003 as Highway 440 and is also part of the North Belt Freeway project. However, completing the North Belt Freeway to I-430 has been put on hold after its cost was estimated at over $600 million. After previously being approved by the American Association of State Highway and Transportation Officials (AASHTO) and the Federal Highway Administration (FHWA), the Arkansas Department of Transportation (ARDOT) officially updated the designation of AR 440 to part of I-440 on August 19, 2025.

== Exit list ==
The entire route is in Pulaski County.

Location	mi	km	Exit	Destinations	Notes
Little Rock	0.00	0.00		I-30 west (US 67 south) – Hot Springs, Texarkana	Western terminus
Little Rock			138	I-30 east (US 67 north) / I-530 south / US 65 / US 167 – Downtown, Pine Bluff	Westbound exit and eastbound entrance; signed as exits 138B (south) and 138A (east); exit nos. correspond to I-30
Little Rock	1.28	2.06	1	AR 365 (Springer Boulevard)	Former US 65
Little Rock	3.44	5.54	3	Bankhead Drive – Clinton National Airport	
Little Rock	3.80	6.12	4	Lindsey Road – Little Rock River Port	
Little Rock	5.16	8.30	5	Fourche Dam Pike – Little Rock River Port	
North Little Rock	6.97	11.22	7	US 165 – England, Scott	
North Little Rock	7.91	12.73	8	CR 82 (Faulkner Lake Road)	
North Little Rock	9.55	15.37	10	US 70	
North Little Rock	9.96	16.03	11	I-40 – Fort Smith, Memphis	Signed as exits 11B (east) and 11A (west); exits 159A-B on I-40
Jacksonville	13.40	21.57	12	AR 161 north – Rixey	Southern terminus of AR 161
Jacksonville	14.16	22.79	13	I-57 / US 67 / US 167 – Sherwood, North Little Rock, Jacksonville	Current eastern terminus; exit 6 on I-57
Jacksonville	14.16	22.79		I-440 north	Proposed continuation north
1.000 mi = 1.609 km; 1.000 km = 0.621 mi: Incomplete access; Unopened
