= Bellingrath House =

Historic house in White Hall, Arkansas, US

- U.S. National Register of Historic Places
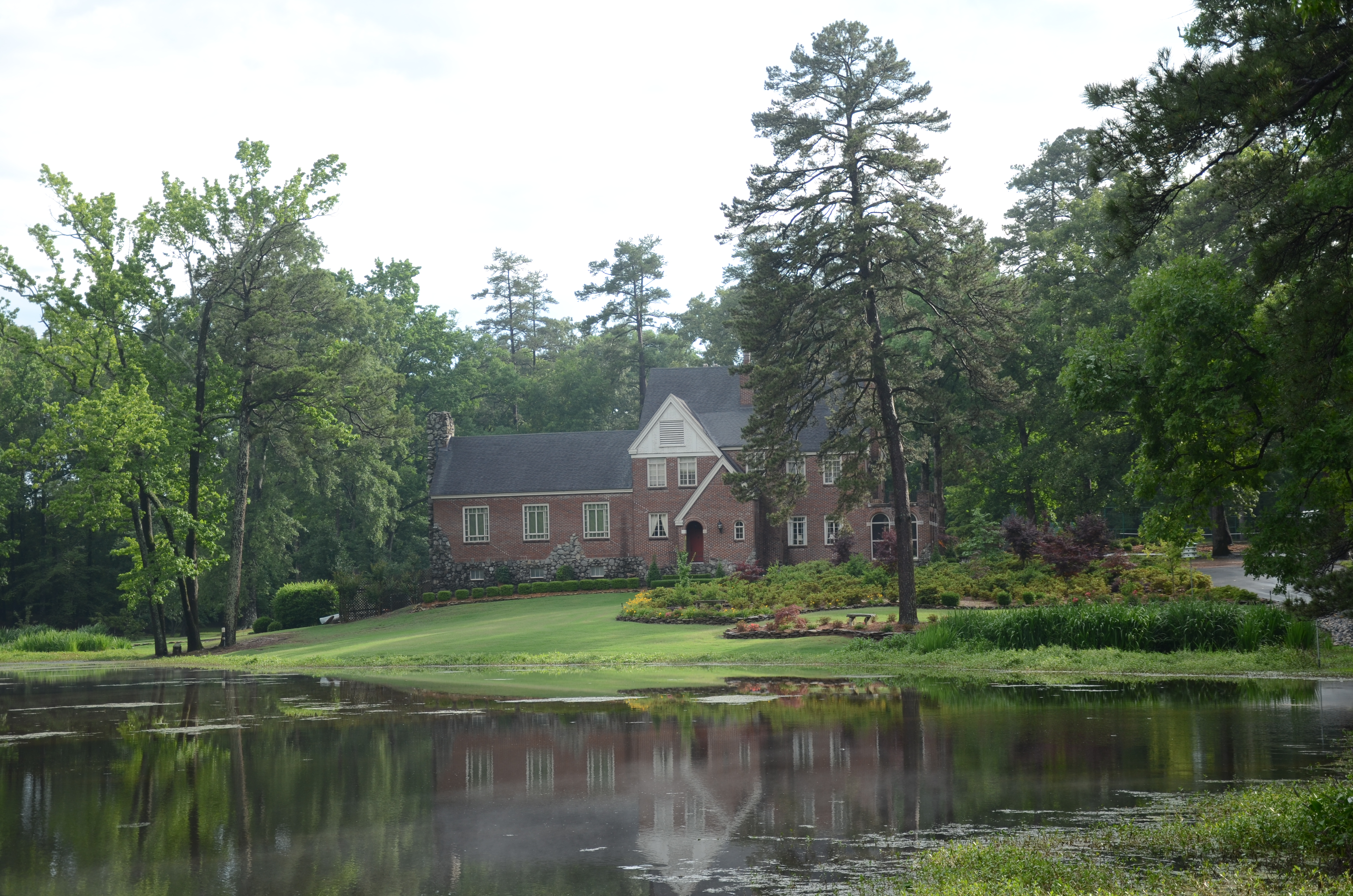
- Location: 7520 Dollarway Rd., White Hall, Arkansas
- Area: 9.93 acres (4.02 ha)
- Built: 1932
- Architect: Seligam, Mitchell
- Architectural style: Tudor Revival
- NRHP reference No.: 94001410
- Added to NRHP: December 1, 1994

The Bellingrath House is a historic house at 7520 Dollarway Road in White Hall, Arkansas. It is a large 2 1/2-story masonry structure, built out of brick, stone, and half-timbered stucco in the Tudor Revival style. Its basically rectangular form is augmented by rectangular projecting sections and gabled elements of varying sizes. It has four chimneys, some brick and some fieldstone, and windows in a variety of configurations and sizes. One of the most notable features of the house is a massive fireplace built of rubble stone at the southern end of the house. The home is nestled away from the road, behind a pond, on a plot of land just under 10 acres.

The house was commissioned by Ferd Bellingrath (b. 1906 d. 1941), owner of a local Coca-Cola bottling company, and is one of the community's most architecturally sophisticated houses. It was designed by local architect Mitchell Seligam in 1932. Building of the home and surrounding structures began in 1934 and were completed in 1935. The home still features the original tennis court.

The house was listed on the National Register of Historic Places in 1994. The city has continued to grow around the home, with a strip mall bordering the southern edge of the property, and a new residential neighborhood just west.

== Bellingrath Family ==
Ferdinand McMillan "Ferd" Bellingrath and his wife, Catherine (née Oudin), moved into the newly built home in 1935. Ferd inherited the Coca-Cola Bottling Company after the death of his father in 1933.

Ferd was shot by a police officer during a domestic dispute involving his family, who were staying with a neighbor, on December 24, 1941. He died the following day at a local hospital. Catherine took over operations of the bottling company and eventually remarried.

The home remains within the Oudin family today.

== See also ==
- National Register of Historic Places listings in Jefferson County, Arkansas
