= Tafton, Arkansas =

Unincorporated community in Arkansas, United States

Coordinates: 34°37′09″N 92°13′16″W

Tafton is an unincorporated community in Pulaski County, Arkansas, United States.

It is in the Little Rock-North Little Rock Metropolitan Area. It is located just north of Wrightsville, Arkansas. It is the second ward.
