= Dora, Arkansas =

- Census-designated place
- Location within Arkansas Location within the United States
- Coordinates: 35°27′46″N 94°25′47″W
- Country: United States
- State: Arkansas
- County: Crawford
- Elevation: 594 ft (181 m)

Population (2020)
  - Total: 121
- Time zone: UTC-6 (Central (CST))
  - Summer (DST): UTC-5 (CDT)
- GNIS feature ID: 2805637

Dora is an unincorporated community and census-designated place (CDP) in Crawford County in the western part of the U.S. state of Arkansas. It is located approximately three miles west of Van Buren on the Arkansas-Oklahoma border along Interstate 40. The community is part of the Fort Smith, Arkansas-Oklahoma Metropolitan Statistical Area. Dora shares its ZIP code (72956) and other municipal services with Van Buren.

It was first listed as a CDP in the 2020 census with a population of 121.

Dora had its start when the Kansas and Arkansas Valley Railway was extended to that point.

== Demographics ==
Historical population
Census	Pop.	Note	%±
2020	121		—
U.S. Decennial Census; 2020

=== 2020 census ===
Dora CDP, Arkansas – Racial and ethnic composition Note: the US Census treats Hispanic/Latino as an ethnic category. This table excludes Latinos from the racial categories and assigns them to a separate category. Hispanics/Latinos may be of any race.
Race / Ethnicity (NH = Non-Hispanic)	Pop 2020	% 2020
White alone (NH)	109	90.08%
Black or African American alone (NH)	0	0.00%
Native American or Alaska Native alone (NH)	0	0.00%
Asian alone (NH)	1	0.83%
Pacific Islander alone (NH)	2	1.65%
Some Other Race alone (NH)	0	0.00%
Mixed Race or Multi-Racial (NH)	3	2.48%
Hispanic or Latino (any race)	6	4.96%
Total	121	100.00%
