= Dollarway Road =

Historic road in Jefferson County, Arkansas

- U.S. National Register of Historic Places
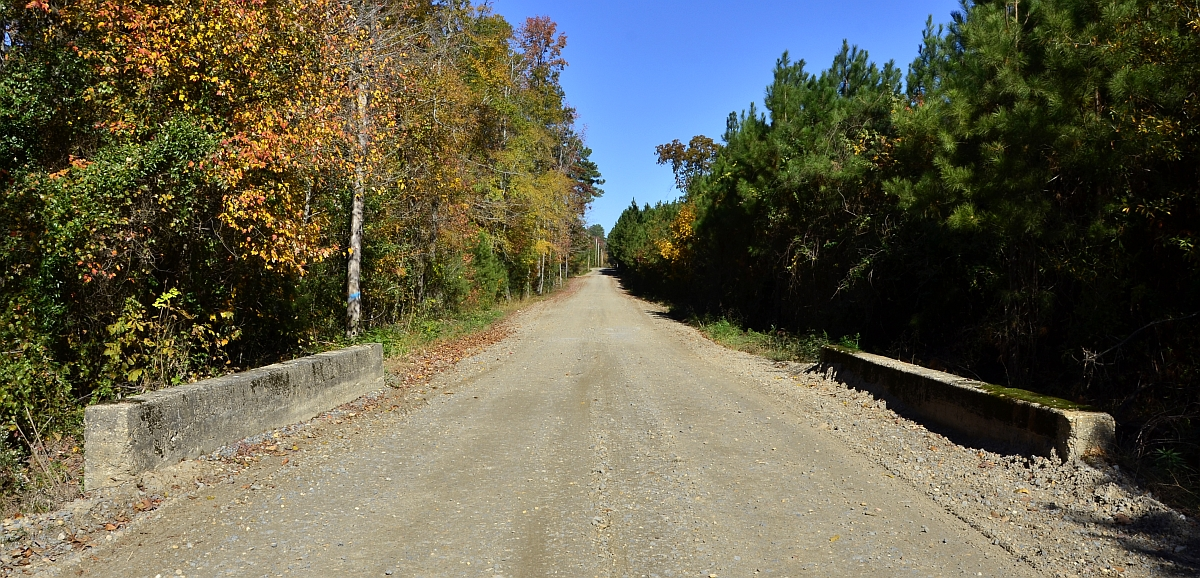
- Dollarway Road in Redfield, Arkansas

- Location within Arkansas
- Nearest city: Redfield, Arkansas
- Coordinates: 34°26′17″N 92°10′49″W
- Area: 12.5 acres (5.1 ha) (after increase)
- Built: 1913–1914
- Built by: Shelby & Bateman
- Architect: Isaac Prather Shelby
- NRHP reference No.: 74000480 (original); 99000822 (increase)

Significant dates
- Added to NRHP: May 17, 1974
- Boundary increase: July 15, 1999

The Dollarway Road is a historic road built in 1914 in Jefferson County, Arkansas. The road was listed on the National Register of Historic Places in 1974.

== History ==
The nation began to focus on good roads at the start of the 20th century. Arkansas didn't establish a state highway system until 1923. Before that, building and maintaining good roads was the responsibility of local road districts, which consisted of area farmers and residents without central leadership and in many cases engineering experience. One district, Jefferson County Road Improvement District No. 4, decided to construct a concrete road from Pine Bluff, Arkansas, north to the Pine Bluff – Little Rock wagon road at the Jefferson County line.

== Dollarway pavement ==
The roadway was paved in 9 feet (2.7 m) wide concrete slabs, poured in a 1-2½-5 mixture. The concrete was topped with a layer of coal tar about 1/16 inch thick. At the edges were 45 degree slopes, which means only 8.5 feet (2.6 m) of the width was level, with the slopes acting as curbs. Further out from the center was 18 inches (0.46 m) of gravel and 3 feet (0.91 m) of earthwork. The gravel shoulder allowed vehicles to continue on the road without stopping for oncoming traffic, which was common at the time.

During the construction of the Toronto-Hamilton Highway, a steam shovel was used to remove two miles of Dollarway pavement. The Ann Arbor City Engineer wrote in 1917 about the durability of Dollarway construction.

As I said before, after the completion of the first pavement, the people were very enthusiastic about this type of pavement. It continued to grow in favor in 1910 and 1911; then the tide commenced slowly to turn. It became evident to all that it was necessary to recarpet the concrete every two or three years, in some cases, varying with traffic conditions, even every year. Those who owned automobiles did not like the throwing up of the tar and sand on the under side of the fenders. In some places, where the carpeting peeled off. the concrete commenced to ravel, and sections, varying in size, had to be cut out and replaced with better material. It was then realized that reducing the first cost to a minimum had caused a heavy burden of maintenance and repair. These pavements must be kept carpeted to preserve the concrete underneath as long as possible.

Tradition holds that the road was called Dollarway because it cost one dollar per linear foot to construct. The final cost was closer to $1.36 per foot. In July 1913, Little Rock, Arkansas contractors Shelby & Bateman were chosen to construct the approximately 23-mile road. Construction began in November 1913, and the road was finished in October 1914. The Dollarway Road was the longest continuous concrete pavement in the United States when complete. The Dollarway Road was the first concrete road in the state.

== Today ==
The original 1974 National Register listing boundary placed the Dollarway within a park near Redfield. In 1999 the listing was enlarged to add a portion of the Dollarway still used today as Reynolds Road. This segment also contains two original Dollarway concrete bridges.

== See also ==
- Arkansas Highway 365
- National Register of Historic Places listings in Jefferson County, Arkansas
