= Sweet Home, Arkansas =

Census-designated place in Pulaski County, Arkansas, USA

- CDP
- Location in Pulaski County and the state of Arkansas
- Coordinates: 34°40′15″N 92°15′02″W
- Country: United States
- State: Arkansas
- County: Pulaski

Area
  - Total: 4.07 sq mi (10.54 km^{2})
  - Land: 3.89 sq mi (10.07 km^{2})
  - Water: 0.18 sq mi (0.47 km^{2})
- Elevation: 305 ft (93 m)

Population (2020)
  - Total: 712
  - Density: 183.0/sq mi (70.67/km^{2})
- Time zone: UTC-6 (Central (CST))
  - Summer (DST): UTC-5 (CDT)
- ZIP code: 72164
- Area code: 501
- FIPS code: 05-68330
- GNIS feature ID: 2402909

Sweet Home is a census-designated place (CDP) in Pulaski County, Arkansas, United States. As of the 2020 census, Sweet Home had a population of 712. It is part of the 'Little Rock-North Little Rock-AR Metropolitan Statistical Area'.

It is a majority African-American area.

== Geography ==
According to the United States Census Bureau, the CDP has a total area of 4.1 square miles (11 km^{2}), of which 3.9 square miles (10 km^{2}) is land and 0.2 square miles (0.52 km^{2}) (2.72%) is water.

== Demographics ==
Historical population
Census	Pop.	Note	%±
2000	1,070		—
2010	849		−20.7%
2020	712		−16.1%
U.S. Decennial Census

=== Racial and ethnic composition ===
Sweet Home CDP, Arkansas – Racial and ethnic composition Note: the US Census treats Hispanic/Latino as an ethnic category. This table excludes Latinos from the racial categories and assigns them to a separate category. Hispanics/Latinos may be of any race.
Race / Ethnicity (NH = Non-Hispanic)	Pop 2000	Pop 2010	Pop 2020	% 2000	% 2010	% 2020
White alone (NH)	249	200	150	23.27%	23.56%	21.07%
Black or African American alone (NH)	792	592	500	74.02%	69.73%	70.22%
Native American or Alaska Native alone (NH)	4	8	0	0.37%	0.94%	0.00%
Asian alone (NH)	1	7	4	0.09%	0.82%	0.56%
Native Hawaiian or Pacific Islander alone (NH)	0	0	0	0.00%	0.00%	0.00%
Other race alone (NH)	0	0	0	0.00%	0.00%	0.00%
Mixed race or Multiracial (NH)	12	20	26	1.12%	2.36%	3.65%
Hispanic or Latino (any race)	12	22	32	1.12%	2.59%	4.49%
Total	1,070	849	712	100.00%	100.00%	100.00%

=== 2020 census ===
As of the 2020 United States census, there were 712 people, 259 households, and 125 families residing in the CDP.

=== 2000 census ===
As of the census of 2000, there were 1,070 people, 385 households, and 267 families residing in the CDP. The population density was 272.0 inhabitants per square mile (105.0/km^{2}). There were 463 housing units at an average density of 117.7 per square mile (45.4/km^{2}). The racial makeup of the CDP was 24.11% White, 74.02% Black or African American, 0.37% Native American, 0.09% Asian, and 1.40% from two or more races. 1.12% of the population were Hispanic or Latino of any race.

There were 385 households, out of which 29.9% had children under the age of 18 living with them, 38.4% were married couples living together, 23.9% had a female householder with no husband present, and 30.4% were non-families. 27.8% of all households were made up of individuals, and 11.2% had someone living alone who was 65 years of age or older. The average household size was 2.78 and the average family size was 3.42.

In the CDP, the population was spread out, with 30.7% under the age of 18, 8.5% from 18 to 24, 25.2% from 25 to 44, 23.0% from 45 to 64, and 12.6% who were 65 years of age or older. The median age was 35 years. For every 100 females, there were 87.7 males. For every 100 females age 18 and over, there were 81.0 males.

The median income for a household in the CDP was $23,352, and the median income for a family was $30,781. Males had a median income of $22,069 versus $21,643 for females. The per capita income for the CDP was $8,868. About 21.7% of families and 25.5% of the population were below the poverty line, including 23.3% of those under age 18 and 60.0% of those age 65 or over.

== History ==
Most of the geographical history of Sweet Home and the surrounding areas was farms and fields. After bauxite mining between the 1940s through 1960s many blue holes were formed in the Sweet Home Area.

Sweet Home was the site of the Arkansas Confederate Soldiers' Home from 1890 to 1955, but the home was moved to the grounds of the Schools for the Deaf and Blind in Little Rock from 1955 to 1963. The Hanger Cotton Gin is listed on the National Register of Historic Places.

== Government ==
On May 29, 1877, its first post office opened.

A facility for African-American mothers who were not married, a branch of the Florence Crittenton Home established during a time of de jure racial segregation in the United States, existed in Sweet Home with its start in 1950. It closed in the 1960s.

== Education ==
It is in the Pulaski County Special School District.

Sweet Home is zoned to College Station Elementary School, Fuller Middle School, and Wilbur D. Mills University Studies High School. Mills is located in Sweet Home.

Some nearby students attended Daisy Bates Elementary School.

== Notable people ==
- Calvin C. Bliss (1823–1891), politician
- Henry Dumas (1934–1968), writer and poet
- Scipio Jones worked as a teacher in a school in Sweet Home.
