= Gold Creek, Arkansas =

Unincorporated community in Arkansas, US

Coordinates: 35°00′43″N 092°24′51″W

Gold Creek is an unincorporated community on the western shore of Lake Conway in Faulkner County, Arkansas, United States. It is located along Interstate 40.
