= U.S. Route 65 in Arkansas =

US Highway section within the state of Arkansas

U.S. Highway 65
- US 65 highlighted in red

Route information
- Maintained by ArDOT
- Length: 309.52 mi (498.12 km)
- Existed: 1926–present

Major junctions
- South end: US 65 at the Louisiana state line near Eudora
- US 82 / US 278 near Lake Village; US 165 near Dermott; US 425 near Pine Bluff; US 63 / US 79 / US 65B / AR 190 in Pine Bluff; US 167 near East End; I-30 / US 67 / I-440 in Little Rock; US 70 in North Little Rock; I-40 / US 67 / US 167 / AR 107 in North Little Rock; US 64 in Conway; US 62 / US 412 near Bellefonte
- North end: US 65 at the Missouri state line near Omaha

Location
- Country: United States
- State: Arkansas
- Counties: Chicot, Desha, Drew, Lincoln, Jefferson, Grant, Pulaski, Faulkner, Van Buren, Searcy, Newton, Boone

Highway system
- United States Numbered Highway System; List; Special; Divided; Arkansas Highway System; Interstate; US; State; Business; Spurs; Suffixed; Scenic; Heritage
← US 64	→ AR 66

U.S. Route 65 (US 65) runs north–south through southeastern and north central Arkansas for 309.52 miles (498.12 km). US 65 enters the state from Louisiana south of Eudora, running concurrently with the Great River Road. The route exits into Missouri northwest of Omaha. US 65 runs through the major cities of Pine Bluff and Little Rock.

== Route description ==
US 65 is largely a four-lane divided highway, except for its overlaps with Interstates, two-lane section between Louisiana and Lake Village, and many undivided highway sections north of I-40. While the majority of the route travels through rural portions of Arkansas far from any Interstate Highways, the route does have a 79.52-mile (127.98 km) concurrency with I-530, I-30, and I-40 between Pine Bluff and Conway through the Little Rock metropolitan area.

US 65 enters Arkansas from Louisiana and follows the Great River Road. US 65 passes through Eudora then continues north intersecting Highway 160. Next, it shares a concurrency with US 82 and 278. It becomes a four-lane highway. while passing through Lake Village. In Lake Village, US 82 separates. Near Dermott, US 65 intersect US 165. In McGehee, US 65 separate from US 278. US 65 passes through rural area. It passes through Dumas where it separates from the Great River Road. US 65 meets with U.S. Route 425 before entering Pine Bluff. US 65 follows I-530 which bypasses Pine Bluff while having a brief concurrency with US 63. I-530 and US 65 continues north. It intersects US 167 at exit 10. It is not accessible from northbound. To access US 167 southbound, motorist will need to take exit 9 then go southbound to exit 10. The three highways enter the Little Rock Metropolitan Area and Little Rock.

In Little Rock, I-530 ends at a high-volume interchange with I-30 and I-440. US 65 shares a concurrency with I-30. Then at the end of I-30, US 167 separates onto I-40 east while US 65 joins I-40 west.

After leaving Little Rock, US 65 separates from I-40 at exit 125 in Conway. US 65 leaves Conway and leaves the Little Rock Metropolitan Area. Then US 65 continues north while passing through the Ozarks and passing through many towns. US 65 passes through Greenbrier, Clinton, Marshall, and Valley Springs. US 65 will join US 412 and 62 before passing through Harrison. After leaving Harrison, US 412 and 62 separates from US 65 at a freeway-to-freeway interchange. US 65 becomes a divided highway. US 65 continues north to the Missouri state line and enters Missouri.

== History ==
The original US 65 between Pine Bluff and Conway is now signed Arkansas Highway 365.

In Pine Bluff, US 65 later relocated to a bypass corridor on the north side of Pine Bluff, dubbed the Downtown Expressway. With the completion of the Interstate 530 bypass on the south side of Pine Bluff in August 1999, US 65 was rerouted along Interstate 530, and the Downtown Expressway was resigned US 65 Business.

== Major intersections ==
County	Location	mi	km	Destinations	Notes
Chicot		0.0	0.0	US 65 south – Tallulah	Continuation into Louisiana
Chicot		1.6	2.6	AR 8 west	Eastern terminus of AR 8
Chicot		4.1	6.6	AR 209 north	Southern terminus of AR 209
Chicot		7.2	11.6	AR 8 east	Southern end of AR 8 concurrency
Chicot	Eudora	8.2	13.2	AR 8 / AR 159 (East Armstrong Street) – Eudora Business District, Parkdale	Northern end of AR 8 concurrency; northern terminus of AR 159
Chicot	Chicot Junction	14.7	23.7	AR 160 west (Portland Road) – Portland	Eastern terminus of AR 160
Chicot	Fairview	20.0	32.2	US 82 east / US 278 east – Greenville MS	Southern end of US 82/US 278 concurrency
Chicot	Chanticleer	22.2	35.7	AR 159 north (South Lakeshore Drive)	Southern end of AR 159 concurrency
Chicot	Chanticleer	22.2	35.7	AR 159 south – Jennie	Northern end of AR 159 concurrency
Chicot	Lake Village	24.6	39.6	US 82 west / AR 144 east – Montrose, Hamburg	Northern end of US 82 concurrency; southern end of AR 144 concurrency
Chicot		25.2	40.6	AR 980 west (Airport Road)	Eastern terminus of AR 980
Chicot	McMillan Corner	28.8	46.3	AR 257 south / AR 144 west	Northern end of AR 144 concurrency; northern terminus of AR 257
Chicot	Bellaire	37.5	60.4	AR 208 west	Eastern terminus of AR 208
Chicot	Halley Junction	39.5	63.6	AR 35 – Halley, Dermott	
Chicot	Dermott	40.9	65.8	US 165 south – Dermott, Montrose	Southern end of US 165 concurrency
Desha		43.3	69.7	AR 159 north – Masonville	Southern terminus of AR 159
Desha	McGehee	45.0	72.4	US 278 west (South First Street) / AR 4 east (Crooked Bayou Drive) – Arkansas City, Monticello	Northern end of US 278 concurrency; western terminus of AR 4
Desha	McGehee	45.5	73.2	AR 169 south	Northern terminus of AR 169
Desha	McGehee	47.2	76.0	To AR 1	Access via AR 1Y
Desha	McGehee	47.6	76.6	AR 159 south (Silent Street)	Northern terminus of AR 159
Desha	Tillar	53.1	85.5	AR 277 south – Tillar	Northern terminus of AR 277
Desha				I-69 / US 278 – Monticello, Memphis	Proposed
Drew		57.9	93.2	AR 138 – Kelso, Winchester	
Desha		61.0	98.2	AR 159 south	Northern terminus of AR 159
Desha	Dumas	65.3	105.1	US 165 north / AR 54 west (Pickens Street) – Dewitt, Business District	Northern end of US 165 concurrency; eastern terminus of AR 54
Desha	Mitchellville	67.4	108.5	AR 159 south	Northern terminus of AR 159
Lincoln	Gould	73.6	118.4	AR 212 east (East Jackson Street) / East Jackson Street	Western terminus of AR 212
Lincoln	Gould	73.6	118.4	AR 114 west (B Avenue) / B Avenue – Fresno	Eastern terminus of AR 114
Lincoln		78.7	126.7	AR 388 east – Cummins Unit, Varner Unit	Western terminus of AR 388
Lincoln	Grady	84.4	135.8	AR 11 (North Main Street) – Grady, Star City	
Jefferson		91.9	147.9	AR 199 south / Blankenship Road – Moscow	Northern terminus of AR 199
Jefferson		100.3	161.4	US 425 south / AR 81 north – Star City, Monticello	Southern end of US 425 concurrency; southern terminus of AR 81
Jefferson	Pine Bluff	102.3	164.6	AR 980 (Grider Field Ladd Road)	
Jefferson	Pine Bluff	102.5	165.0	Southern end of freeway section US 425 ends, I-530 begins	
Jefferson	Pine Bluff	102.5– 102.8	165.0– 165.4	US 63 north / US 79 north / US 65B north / AR 190 west – Downtown	Southern end of US 63/US 79 concurrency; exit 46 on I-530
see I-530, I-30, and I-40
Faulkner	Conway	182.52	293.74	I-40 west / US 65B south (Skyline Drive) – Fort Smith	Northern end of I-40 concurrency; northern terminus of US 65B; exit 125 on I-40
Faulkner	Conway	182.52	293.74	Northern end of freeway section	
Faulkner	Springhill	189.02	304.20	AR 287 south / Elliott Road – Holland	Northern terminus of AR 287
Faulkner	Greenbrier	192.02	309.03	AR 25 south (Green Valley Drive) – Wooster	Southern end of AR 25 concurrency
Faulkner	Greenbrier	192.42	309.67	AR 225 (Main Street)	
Faulkner		194.02	312.24	AR 285 north – Woolly Hollow State Park	Southern terminus of AR 285
Faulkner		194.42	312.89	AR 25 north – Quitman, Heber Springs	Northern end of AR 25 overlap
Faulkner	Damascus	202.02	325.12	AR 124 west (Presley Boulevard) – Springfield	Southern end of AR 124 concurrency
Faulkner–Van Buren county line	Damascus	202.22	325.44	AR 285 north (West Main Street) – Center Ridge	Southern terminus of AR 285
Van Buren		204.22	328.66	AR 124 east – Quitman	Western terminus of AR 124
Van Buren	Bee Branch	208.62	335.74	AR 92 – Greers Ferry, Center Ridge	
Van Buren	Choctaw	215.92	347.49	AR 9 south – Center Ridge	Southern end of AR 9 concurrency
Van Buren	Clinton	218.32	351.35	AR 336 west – Culpepper	Eastern terminus of AR 336
Van Buren	Clinton	218.42	351.51	AR 95 north	Southern end of AR 95 concurrency
Van Buren	Clinton	223.02	358.92	US 65B north (AR 9 south) – Scotland	Northern end of AR 9 concurrency; southern terminus of US 65B
Van Buren	Clinton	223.92	360.36	US 65B south	Northern terminus of US 65B
Van Buren	Clinton	224.02	360.53	AR 16 west – Witts Springs	Southern end of AR 16 concurrency
Van Buren	Clinton	224.22	360.85	AR 16 east – Fairfield Bay	Northern end of AR 16 concurrency
Van Buren	Botkinburg	232.42	374.04	AR 110 east – Old Lexington	Western terminus of AR 110
Van Buren	Dennard	236.72	380.96	AR 254 west	Eastern terminus of AR 254
Searcy	Leslie	240.02	386.27	AR 66 east – Mountain View, Leslie Business District	Western terminus of AR 66
Searcy	Marshall	247.02	397.54	AR 27 north to AR 14 – Harriet, Yellville	Southern end of AR 27 concurrency; AR 14 not signed southbound
Searcy	Marshall	247.42	398.18	AR 27 south (Center Street) to AR 16 – Canaan, Business District, Russellville	Northern end of AR 27 concurrency; Russellville not signed northbound
Searcy		249.62	401.72	AR 333 west – Canaan	Eastern terminus of AR 333
Searcy		252.12	405.75	AR 74 west – Snowball, Witts Springs	Eastern terminus of AR 74
Searcy		259.42	417.50	AR 333 south – Gilbert	Northern terminus of AR 333
Searcy	St. Joe	262.42	422.32	AR 374 east	Southern end of AR 374 concurrency
Searcy	St. Joe	262.62	422.65	AR 374 west	Northern end of AR 374 concurrency
Searcy	Pindall	267.72	430.85	AR 235 north to AR 125	Southern terminus of AR 235
Newton	No major junctions				
Searcy	No major junctions				
Newton	Western Grove	274.92	442.44	US 65B north / AR 123 south – Mount Judea, Western Grove Business District	Southern terminus of US 65B; northern terminus of AR 123; Business District not signed southbound
Newton	Western Grove	276.12	444.37	US 65B south – Western Grove Business District	Northern terminus of US 65B; Business District not signed northbound
Boone		278.12	447.59	AR 206 east – Everton	Southern end of AR 206 concurrency
Boone		283.32– 283.42	455.96– 456.12	US 62 east / US 412 – Yellville, Mountain Home	Southern end of US 62/US 412 concurrency
Boone	Bellefonte	284.42	457.73	AR 206 west (Garrett Street)	Northern end of AR 206 concurrency
Boone	Harrison	286.72	461.43	US 65B north (South Main Street)	Southern terminus of US 65B
Boone	Harrison	288.52	464.33	US 65B south (East Central Avenue) / AR 7 south – Jasper	Southern end of AR 7 concurrency; northern terminus of US 65B
Boone	Harrison	288.62	464.49	AR 7 north (North Chestnut Street) – Lead Hill	Northern end of AR 7 concurrency
Boone	Harrison	290.92	468.19	AR 43 north	Southern terminus of AR 43
Boone	Harrison	292.62	470.93	AR 980 – Airport	Northern terminus of AR 980
Boone		295.42– 295.62	475.43– 475.75	US 62 west / US 412 west – Eureka Springs, Huntsville	Northern end of US 62/US 412 concurrency
Boone		302.42	486.70	AR 396 west	Eastern terminus of AR 396
Boone		308.62	496.68	AR 14 east – Omaha	Southern end of AR 14 concurrency
Boone		309.32	497.80	AR 14 west	Northern end of AR 14 concurrency
Boone		309.52	498.12	US 65 north – Springfield, Branson	Continuation into Missouri
1.000 mi = 1.609 km; 1.000 km = 0.621 mi: Concurrency terminus; Route transition

== See also ==
- Special routes of U.S. Route 65
