= List of Interstate Highways in Arkansas =

- Highway markers for Interstate 40 and Interstate 555
- Interstate Highways highlighted in red; related state routes in blue

System information
- Formed: 1956

Highway names
- Interstates: Interstate nn (I-nn)

System links
- Arkansas Highway System; Interstate; US; State; Business; Spurs; Suffixed; Scenic; Heritage

The list of Interstate Highways in Arkansas encompasses 11 members of the Dwight D. Eisenhower National System of Interstate and Defense Highways in the state of Arkansas.

== Cable median barriers ==
The 2010–2013 Statewide Transportation Improvement Program from the Arkansas State Highway and Transportation Department (AHTD) lists cable median barrier installation projects along segments of Interstate 30 (I-30), I-40, I-55, I-430, Interstate 540, and US 67 to begin as funds become available. The high-tension designs will first be installed in areas with narrow medians (less than 40 feet (12 m) wide) that carry an average daily traffic of 15,000 or greater near sites of recent serious crossover collisions.

== Primary Interstates ==
Number	Length (mi)	Length (km)	Southern or western terminus	Northern or eastern terminus	Formed	Removed	Notes
I-30	143.02	230.17	I-30 at the Texas state line	I-40/US 65/US 67/US 167/AR 107 in North Little Rock	1957	current	Goes through Hope, Arkadelphia, Benton, and Little Rock
I-40	284.69	458.16	I-40 at the Oklahoma state line	I-40 at the Tennessee state line	1964	current	Goes through Van Buren, Russellville, Conway, North Little Rock, ends at Hernando de Soto Bridge crossing the Mississippi River
I-42	10	16	I-42 at the Oklahoma state line	I-49/US 62/US 71 in Springdale	2026	current	Officially designated in 2026; future route along US 412
I-49	109.81	176.72	I-49 at the Louisiana state line I-40/US 71 in Alma	US 59/US 71 in Texarkana I-49 at the Missouri state line	2014	current	
I-55	72.22	116.23	I-55/US 61/US 64/US 70/US 78/US 79/SR 1 at the Tennessee state line	I-55 at the Missouri state line	1960	current	Parallels the Mississippi River
I-57	122.8	197.6	I-40/US 67/US 167 in North Little Rock	US 67/US 412/US 412B in Walnut Ridge	2024	current	Officially designated in 2024
Future I-69	185	298	I-69 at the Louisiana state line	I-69/US 278 at the Mississippi state line	proposed	—	Monticello Bypass currently open with two lanes; proposed to head northeast between Magnolia and El Dorado then proposed to head north near Louann then proposed to head east and go south of Camden, Harrell, Warren, Wilmar, and Monticello, where it will meet the I-530 extension, then proposed to go north of McGehee then proposed to go south of Arkansas City then proposed to end at Charles W. Dean Bridge, which will cross the Mississippi River
Proposed and unbuilt

== Auxiliary Interstates ==
Number	Length (mi)	Length (km)	Southern or western terminus	Northern or eastern terminus	Formed	Removed	Notes
I-130	5.8	9.3	US 71 in Texarkana	I-30 in Texarkana	2000	2014	Planned as a spur route for the Texarkana loop east of the Texas state line; now signed as I-49
I-430	12.93	20.81	I-30/US 67/US 70 in Little Rock	I-40/US 65/AR 100 in North Little Rock	c. 1980	current	Bypasses Little Rock and North Little Rock
I-440	14.16	22.79	I-30/US 65/US 67/US 167/I-530 in Little Rock	I-57/US 67/US 167 in Jacksonville	2003	current	Connects I-57 and I-40 with I-30 and I-530
I-530	46.65	75.08	US 63/US 79/US 65B/US 65/US 425/AR 190 in Pine Bluff	I-30/US 65/US 67/US 167/I-440 in Little Rock	1999	current	Will connect to Future I-69
I-540	15.87	25.54	US 271/SH-9 at the Oklahoma state line	I-40/US 71 in Van Buren	1965	current	Northern section became part of I-49
I-555	49.2	79.2	I-55/US 61/US 78/AR 77 in Turrell	US 63/AR 18/AR 91 in Jonesboro	2016	current	Continues north as US 63
I-630	7.40	11.91	I-430/Chenal Parkway/Shackleford Road in Little Rock	I-30/US 65/US 67/US 167 in Little Rock	1985	current	
I-730	—	—	US 49 in Jonesboro	US 67	—	2016	Would have followed AR 226 but was cancelled when I-30 extension was cancelled in 2016
Former
