= Arkansas Heritage Trails System =

Highway system

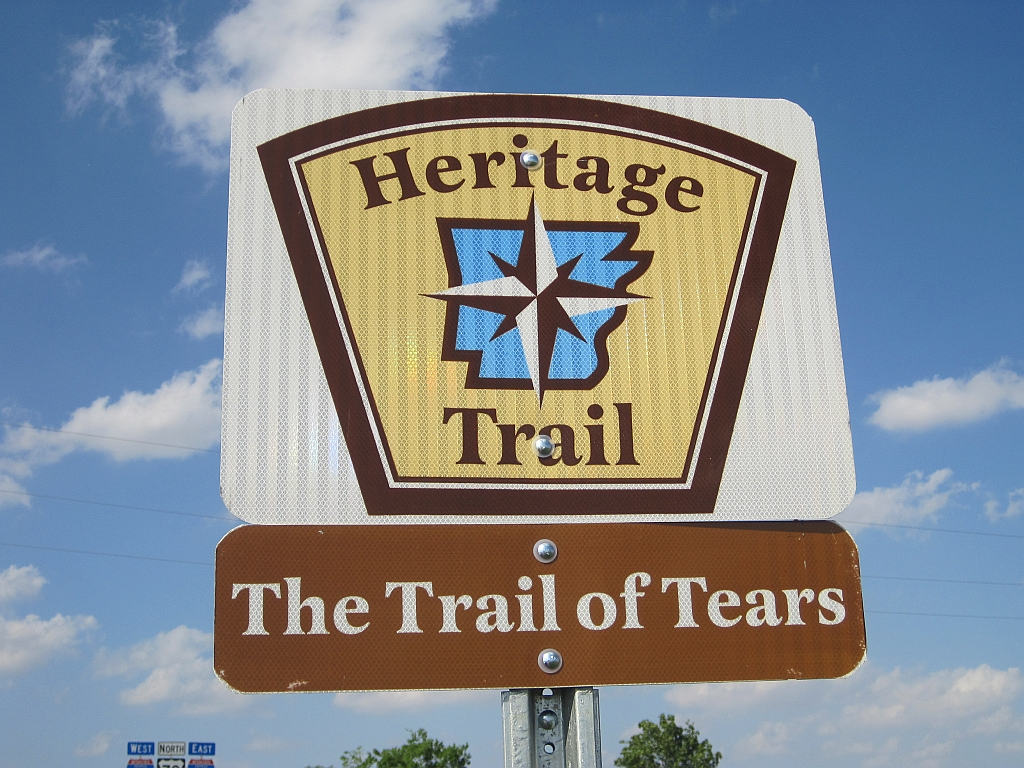
- Highway shield for Trail of Tears

System information
- Formed: March 31, 2009

Highway names
- Interstates: Interstate nn (I-nn)
- US Highways: US Highway nn (US nn)

System links
- Arkansas Highway System; Interstate; US; State; Business; Spurs; Suffixed; Scenic; Heritage

Arkansas Heritage Trails System is a network of four historic trails within the state of Arkansas. The heritage trails system was established by the Arkansas General Assembly on March 31, 2009. Roadways included in the system are Arkansas Department of Transportation (ArDOT) as well as county roads. The program emphasizes cooperation among the Arkansas Department of Heritage, the Department of Parks and Tourism, and the Department of Transportation.

== Butterfield Trail ==
- Memphis to Fort Smith Route (with two separate routes through Little Rock)
- Fort Smith to Missouri Route

== Southwest Trail ==
- Southwest Trail Route

== Trail of Tears ==
- Bell Route
- Benge Route
- Northern Route
- Seminole Route
- Chickasaw Route
- Muscogee Route
- Choctaw Route

== Civil War Trail ==
- Cabell's Route to Fayetteville
- Camden Expedition Route
- Confederate Approaches to Helena
  - Fagan's Approach Route
  - Marmaduke's Approach Route
  - Price, McRae and Parson's Approach Route
  - Walker's Approach Route
- Confederate Approaches to Pine Bluff
  - Monroe and Thompson's Approach Route
  - Newton's Approach Route
  - Greene's Approach Route
- Little Rock Campaign
  - Steele's Approach Route
  - Davidson's Approach Route
- Pea Ridge Campaign
  - Confederate Advance Route
  - Sigel's Retreat Route
  - Ford Road Route
  - Bentonville Detour Route
  - Telegraph Road Route
  - Confederate Retreat Route, Alvin Seamster Road between Elkhorn Tavern and US 62
  - Curtis's Movements Route
  - Steele's Movements Route
- Prairie Grove Campaign Route
  - Hindman's Approach Route
  - Herron's Approach Route
  - Blunt's Approach Route
- Price Raid Route

== See also ==
- Historic trails and roads in the United States
