= Arkansas Highway 197 =

State highway designation in Arkansas, United States

Highway 197

Route information
- Maintained by ArDOT

Section 1
- Length: 17.33 mi (27.89 km)
- South end: AR 22 in Subiaco
- North end: End of state maintenance southeast of Tokalon

Section 2
- Length: 1.67 mi (2.69 km)
- South end: AR 22 in New Blaine
- North end: End of state maintenance near Shoal Bay

Section 3
- Length: 0.28 mi (450 m)
- South end: Entrance to Rockline Industries Booneville plant
- North end: AR 10 in Booneville

Location
- Country: United States
- State: Arkansas
- Counties: Logan

Highway system
- Arkansas Highway System; Interstate; US; State; Business; Spurs; Suffixed; Scenic; Heritage
← AR 196	→ AR 198

Arkansas Highway 197 (AR 197, Ark. 197, and Hwy. 197) is the designation for a state highway in the U.S. state of Arkansas. The route is split into three sections, all of which are located in western Arkansas. The first and longest section begins at AR 22 in Subiaco, and ends near Lake Dardanelle southwest of Tokalon. The second section begins at AR 22 in New Blaine, and ends just south of Shoal Bay. The third section begins at AR 10 in Booneville, and ends about 0.3 miles (0.48 km) south. All three signed highways are located within Logan County.

== Route description ==
=== Section 1 ===
The first and longest section begins at AR 22 in Subiaco. The route heads towards the north, before taking a sharp turn towards the east near Wilkins, right at the intersection of AR 393. The route heads more in a northeasterly direction for about 6.5 miles (10.5 km) before entering the town of Scranton, and intersecting AR 109. The route continues east for about 7 miles (11 km) before reaching its northern terminus near Lake Dardanelle. The route is about 17.33 miles (27.89 km) long.

=== Section 2 ===
The second section begins at AR 22 in New Blaine. The southern section of AR 197 around New Blaine is a former alignment of AR 22, and is still used as a primary road to access the town center. AR 197 breaks off of the former AR 22 alignment just east of the town center, heading north. The route ends at Shoal Bay Recreation Area about 1.0 mile (1.6 km) north of New Blaine. The route does not intersect any other signed highways or communities.

=== Section 3 ===
A third section of AR 197 can be found in Booneville. This section begins at AR 10, just west of AR 116, and ends about 0.3 miles (0.48 km) south of its northern terminus, providing access to the Rockline Industries Booneville plant.

== Major intersections ==
The entire route is in Logan County.

Location	mi	km	Destinations	Notes
Subiaco	0.00	0.00	AR 22 – Paris, Dardanelle	Southern terminus
	3.08	4.96	AR 393 north	AR 393 southern terminus
	4.62	7.44	AR 288 east – Prairie View	AR 288 western terminus
Scranton	9.61	15.47	AR 109 – Clarksville, Midway	
Tokalon	17.33	27.89	Dead end at Lake Dardanelle	Eastern terminus
Gap in route
New Blaine	0.00	0.00	AR 22 – Dardanelle, Paris	Southern terminus
Shoal Bay	1.67	2.69	Shoal Bay Road	Northern terminus
Gap in route
Booneville	0.00	0.00	AR 10 – Booneville, Danville, Fort Smith	Northern terminus
Booneville	0.28	0.45	Rockline Industries entrance	Southern terminus
1.000 mi = 1.609 km; 1.000 km = 0.621 mi
