= Arkansas Highway 288 =

State highway in Arkansas, United States

Highway 288

Route information
- Maintained by ArDOT

Section 1
- Length: 10.03 mi (16.14 km)
- West end: AR 41
- East end: AR 309, Roseville

Section 2
- Length: 4.63 mi (7.45 km)
- West end: AR 197
- East end: AR 109, Prairie View

Location
- Country: United States
- State: Arkansas
- Counties: Franklin, Logan

Highway system
- Arkansas Highway System; Interstate; US; State; Business; Spurs; Suffixed; Scenic; Heritage
← AR 287	→ AR 289

Highway 288 (AR 288, Ark. 288 and Hwy. 288) is a designation for two east–west state highways in northwest Arkansas. One segment of 10.03 miles (16.14 km) runs from Highway 41 near Peter Pender east to Highway 309. A second segment of 4.63 miles (7.45 km) runs east connecting Highway 197 to Highway 109.

== Route description ==
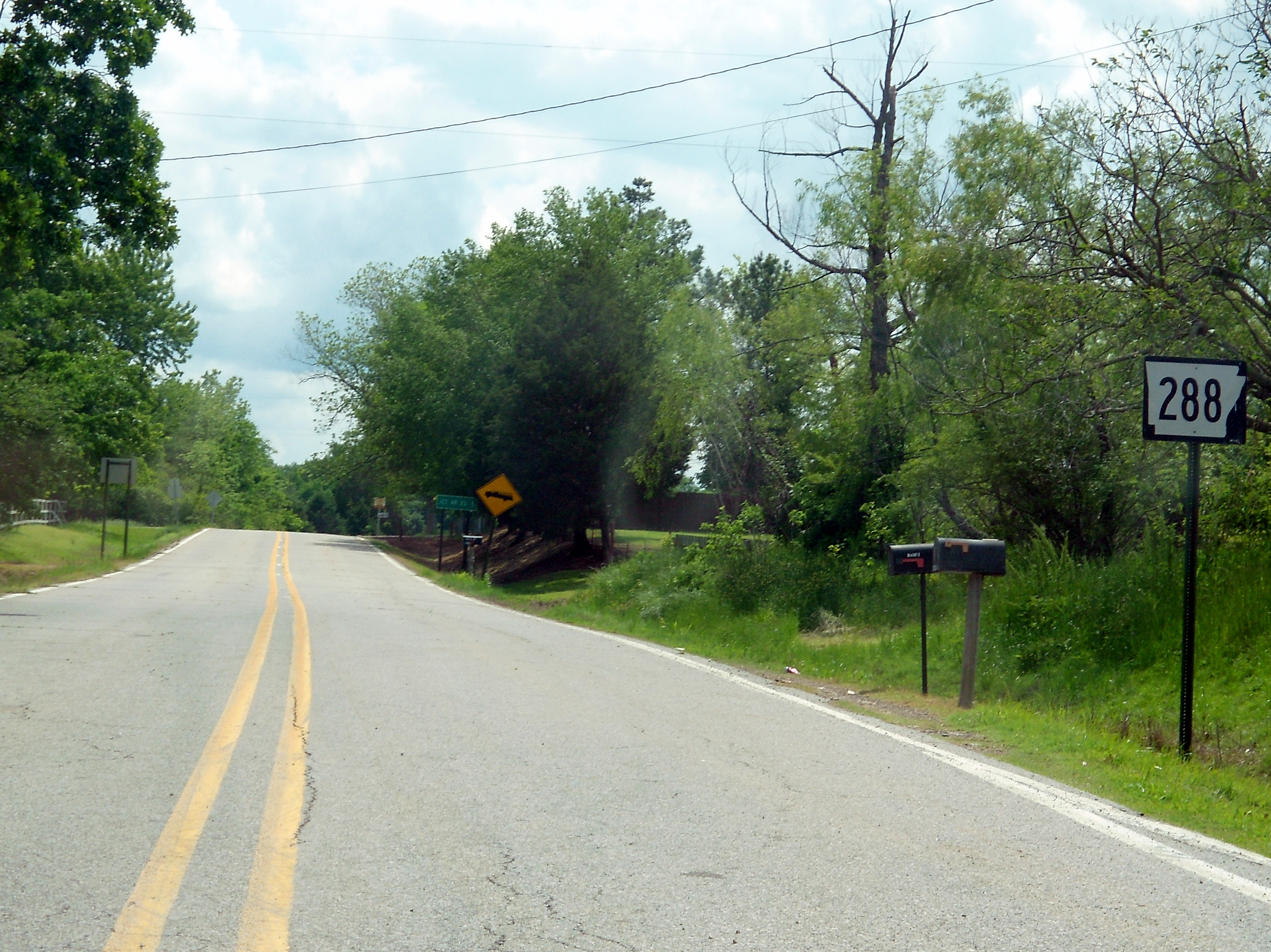
Highway 288 at Roseville

=== Peter Pender to Roseville ===
Highway 288 begins at Highway 41 near the unincorporated community Peter Pender. The route runs east, intersecting Highway 23 before entering Logan County and terminating at Highway 309 at Roseville. The road is two–lane undivided for its entire length.

=== Highway 197 to Prairie View ===
The highway begins just east of Wilkins at Highway 197. Highway 288 heads due east to Prairie View, where it terminates at Highway 109. The road is two–lane undivided for its entire length.

== Major intersections ==
County	Location	mi	km	Destinations	Notes
Franklin		0.00	0.00	AR 41	Western terminus
Franklin		4.64	7.47	AR 23 – Webb City, Ozark, Caulksville, Booneville	
Logan	Roseville	10.03	16.14	AR 309 – Paris, Ozark	Eastern terminus
Logan	Highway 288 begins at Highway 197				
Logan		0.00	0.00	AR 197	Western terminus
Logan	Prairie View	4.63	7.45	AR 109 – Scranton, Midway	Eastern terminus
1.000 mi = 1.609 km; 1.000 km = 0.621 mi

== See also ==
- List of state highways in Arkansas
