= Arkansas Highway 109 =

State highway in Arkansas, United States

Highway 109

Route information
- Maintained by ArDOT
- Length: 44.0 mi (70.8 km)

Major junctions
- South end: AR 217 near Magazine
- North end: US 64 in Clarksville

Location
- Country: United States
- State: Arkansas
- Counties: Logan, Johnson

Highway system
- Arkansas Highway System; Interstate; US; State; Business; Spurs; Suffixed; Scenic; Heritage
← AR 108	→ AR 110

Highway 109 is a 44-mile-long (71 km) highway in western Arkansas. It runs from the Ouachita Mountains to the Arkansas River Valley in Logan and Johnson counties. There are no spur routes associated with this highway.

Mount Magazine can be seen to the east on the southern portion of the route. It can also be seen south of the Highway 22 portion of the Route.

One of the most famous feature on the route is the Morrison Bluff Bridge, also known as the Ada Mills Bridge, over the Arkansas River. This 1.6-mile (2.6 km) bridge claims to be the longest over the Arkansas River and also the longest bridge in Arkansas. However, it is shorter than two current Mississippi River bridges partially located in Arkansas, the Hernando de Soto Bridge and the Greenville Bridge.

== Route description ==
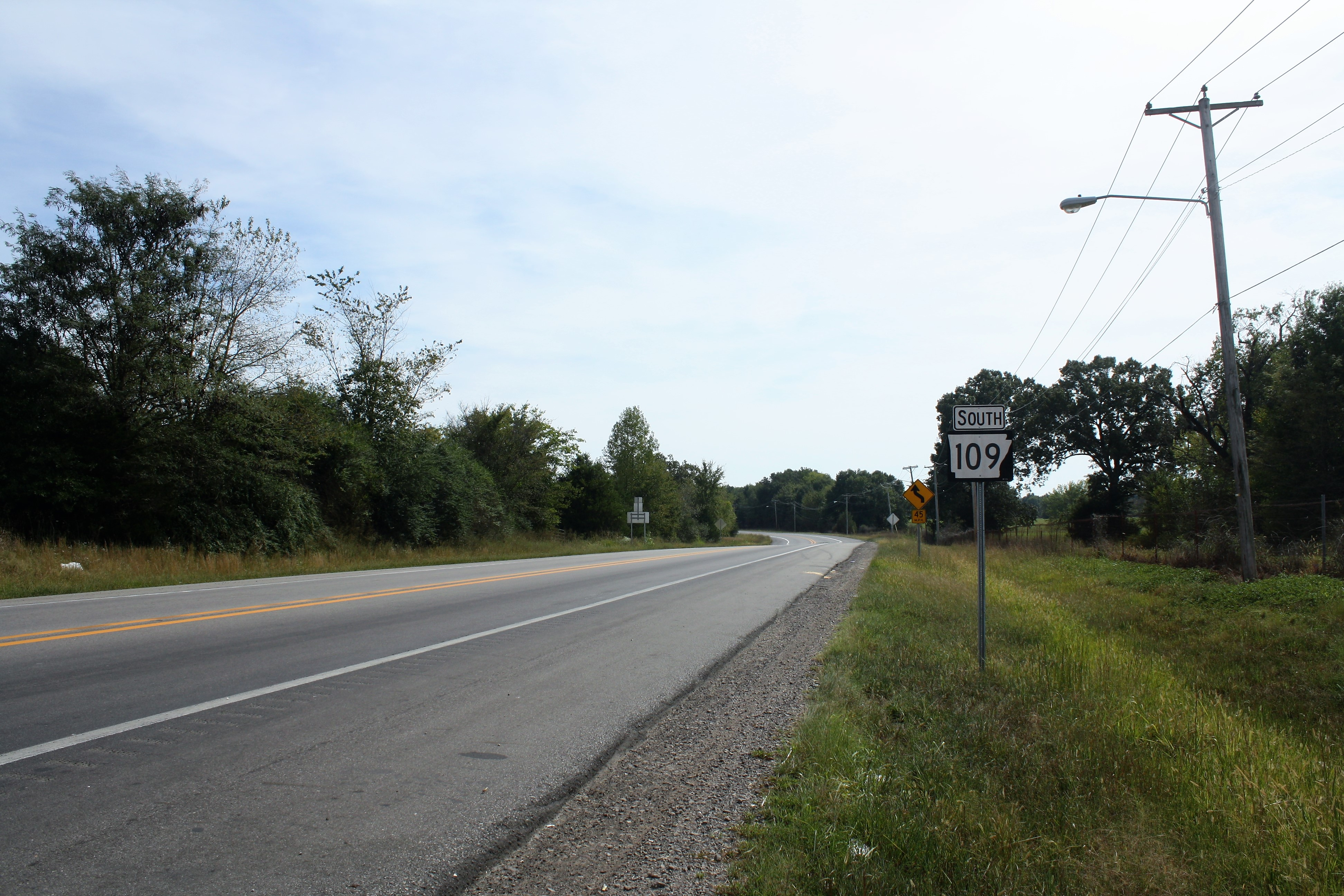
First reassurance marker south of the US 64 junction in Clarksville

Highway 109 begins at Highway 217 in Logan County. It then runs 5.2 miles (8.4 km) north to Highway 10. After joining Highway 10 west for 0.1-mile (0.16 km), Highway 109 runs 13.6 miles (21.9 km) north to Highway 309. It joins highway 309 north for a mile, then departs Highway 309 join Highway 22 east. It follows Highway 22 east for the next 11.5 miles (18.5 km) where it departs that highway to head north. It then travels north via the Ada Mills Bridge across the Arkansas River to U.S. Highway 64 in Clarksville.

== Major intersections ==
County	Location	mi	km	Destinations	Notes
Logan		0.0	0.0	AR 217 – Sugar Grove, Booneville	Southern terminus
Logan	Magazine	5.2	8.4	AR 10 east – Danville	Southern end of AR 10 concurrency
Logan	Magazine	5.3	8.5	AR 10 west – Booneville	Northern end of AR 10 concurrency
Logan	Paris	18.9	30.4	AR 309 south – Havana, Mount Magazine State Park	Southern end of AR 309 concurrency
Logan	Paris	19.9	32.0	AR 22 west – Charleston AR 309 north	Northern end of AR 309 concurrency; southern end of AR 22 concurrency
Logan	Subiaco	25.2	40.6	AR 197 – Scranton	
Logan	Midway	31.4	50.5	AR 22 east – Dardanelle	Northern end of AR 22 concurrency
Logan	Prairie View	34.6	55.7	AR 288 – Wilkins	Eastern terminus of AR 288
Logan	Scranton	36.9	59.4	AR 197	
Logan	Morrison Bluff	38.5	62.0	AR 393	Eastern terminus of AR 393
Johnson	Clarksville	44.0	70.8	US 64 – Hartman, Clarksville	Northern terminus
1.000 mi = 1.609 km; 1.000 km = 0.621 mi: Concurrency terminus

== See also ==
- List of state highways in Arkansas

== See also ==
Media related to Arkansas Highway 109 at Wikimedia Commons
