= Roseville, Arkansas =

Settlement in Arkansas, US

Roseville is a historically important community in Logan County, Arkansas. Skirmishes and guerrilla attacks occurred in the area during the Civil War. A historical marker commemorates the Civil War history.

It was a port on the Arkansas River and was a site of conflict during the American Civil War. Doctor J. S. Shibley and Dr. T. D. Nichols wrote a clinical study of pneumonia in the community. Col. W. S. O'Kane had a merchandising business in Roseville before he relocated to Altua. Charles Humphrey served as postmaster and petitioned for a postal route from Atlas to Paris.

Daniel Oliver was lynched in Roseville in 1884.

According to the census 72 people live in Roseville. Most are white.

Dr. Stephen H. Chism, whose home in Booneville (Dr. Stephen H. Chism House) is listed on the National Register of Historic Places, moved to Roseville. His son Benjamin Boone Chism served as Secretary of State of Arkansas.

The Arkansas Digital Archives notes a vertical file of documents related to the community.
