= Chismville, Arkansas =

- Unincorporated community
- Location in Arkansas Location in the United States
- Coordinates: 35°13′2″N 93°56′26″W
- Country: United States
- State: Arkansas
- County: Logan
- Township: Washburn
- Elevation: 499 ft (152 m)
- Time zone: UTC-6 (Central (CST))
  - Summer (DST): UTC-5 (CDT)
- ZIP code: 72927
- Area code: 870
- GNIS feature ID: 56959

Chismville is an unincorporated community in Washburn Township, Logan County, Arkansas, United States. It is located where Highway 217 terminates at Highway 23.

A town developed at the crossroads. It was named for the Chism family. Benjamin Boone Chism who served in the Civil War and became Arkansas Secretary of State was part of the family, the son of Stephen H. Chism and Jeanette Logan Chism.

A train line bypassed the community and it declined.

The Dr. Stephen H. Chism House is a log structure that is listed on the National Register of Historic Places and has been restored. It was home to Benjamin Boone Chism's father Stephen H. Chism who served in the Arkansas Senate.
