= Magazine School District =

School district in Arkansas, United States

Address
- 485 East Priddy Street Magazine, Arkansas, 72943; United States

District information
- Type: Public
- Grades: PreK–12
- NCES District ID: 0509150

Students and staff
- Students: 572
- Teachers: 61.71
- Staff: 56.14
- Student–teacher ratio: 9.27

Other information
- Website: www.magazinek12.com

Magazine School District is a school district based in Magazine, Arkansas. The district serves approximately 600 students in prekindergarten through grade 12 and employs more than 115 educators and staff at its two schools and district offices.

The school district encompasses 119.23 square miles (308.8 km^{2}) of land in Logan County and serves all or portions of Magazine, Paris, Booneville, and Blue Mountain.

The district and schools mascot and athletic emblem is the Rattlers with black and red serving as the school colors.

== Schools ==
- J. D. Leftwich High School, serving grades 7 through 12.
- Magazine Elementary School, serving prekindergarten through grade 6.
