= Benjamin Boone Chism =

American soldier, farmer, lawyer and politician

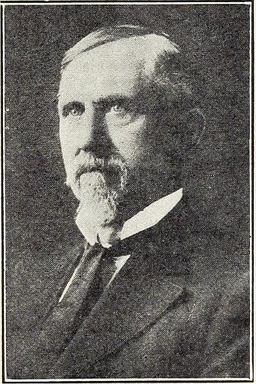

Arkansas State Senate
- In office 1877–18?

Secretary of State of Arkansas
- In office 1889–1893

Personal details
- Born: March 12, 1845 Booneville, Arkansas
- Died: January 15, 1924 (aged 78)
- Party: Democratic

Benjamin Boone Chism (March 12, 1845 - January 15, 1924) was a soldier, farmer, lawyer and politician in Arkansas. He served as a state legislator in the Arkansas State Senate from 1877 and as Secretary of State of Arkansas 1889-1893.

== Early life ==
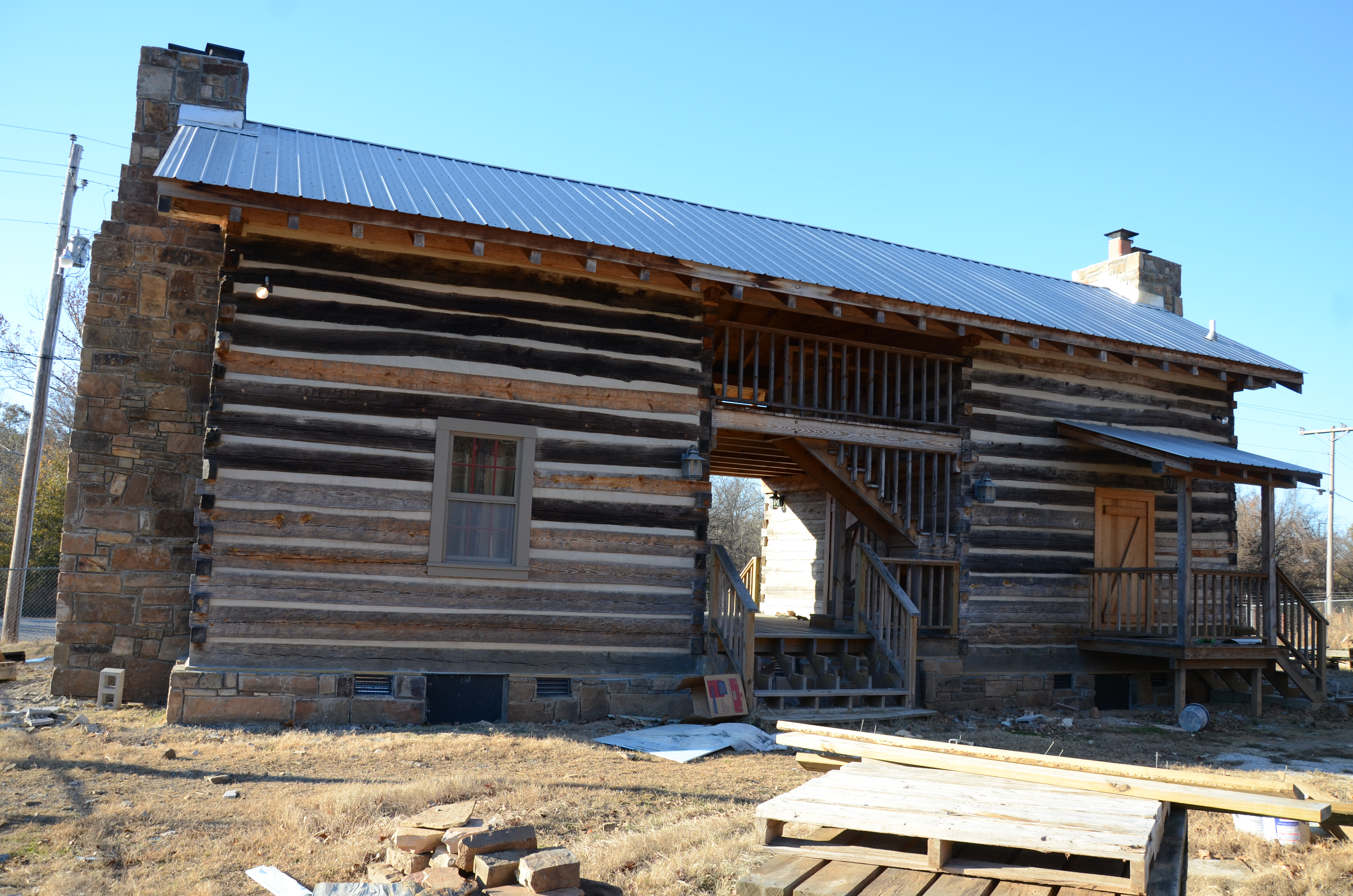
Dr. Stephen H. Chism House outside Booneville, Arkansas being renovated

Chism was born March 12, 1845 in Booneville to state senator Stephen H. Chism and Jennatta Logan. She was the daughter of James Logan for whom Logan County, Arkansas is named. His education was in the local common school and then the Academy and Wallace Institute in Van Buren, Arkansas.

== Civil War ==
He enlisted into the Confederate States Army joining the 5th Arkansas Infantry Regiment at the age of sixteen and later moved to the 17th Arkansas Infantry. He served in the American Civil War from 1861 until 1865 and was involved in many battles including the Battle of Wilson's Creek in Missouri and Battle of Pea Ridge in Arkansas. By the age of 18 he was commanding a company that fought in the battle at Corinth, Mississippi and rose to the rank of Captain. He was taken prisoner and later badly wounded during his service.

== Post-war ==
After the war he started as a farmer, rebuilding the family farm then was involved with general trading all the while studying law. He married Addie Titsworth in 1871 and they had six children together. He was admitted to the bar in Arkansas in 1873.

He was a delegate to the post-reconstruction constitutional convention in 1874. He was part of the post-reconstruction "redeeming" that took place with Democrats reasserting control and ousting Republicans and African Americans from political offices and voting rights. Chism was elected to the Arkansas State Senate in 1876 serving from 1877 representing the 8th district representing Yell County and Logan County, Arkansas. He was then elected as Secretary of State of Arkansas in 1888 as a Democrat and again in 1890. During his time in the State House he also repaired the gutters, repaired the roof and fixed the heating. Chism continued in politics until he retired in 1904 and a few years later in 1907 he moved to Fort Smith but still kept his home in Paris.

The log cabin home of his father, Dr. Stephen H. Chism, is listed on the National Register of Historic Places. Logan County and Chism, Arkansas as well as the Chism House, listed on the National Register of Historic Places are named for family members.

He died January 15, 1924 in Fort Smith at the house of his daughter, Mrs. Luther D. Reid. He is interned in Paris, Arkansas.
