= Morrison Bluff =

Morrison Bluff may refer to:

- Morrison Bluff, Arkansas, a town in Logan County, Arkansas, United States
- Morrison Bluff (Antarctica), a bluff in the Kohler Range, Marie Byrd Land, Antarctica
