= Booneville High School =

Location
- 945 North Plum Street; Booneville, Arkansas 72927; United States
- Coordinates: 35°8′46″N 93°54′36″W

Information
- Type: Public secondary
- Established: 1904 (122 years ago)
- School district: Booneville School District
- NCES District ID: 0504930
- CEEB code: 040575
- NCES School ID: 050493000214
- Teaching staff: 32.57 (on FTE basis)
- Grades: 10–12
- Enrollment: 266 (2023-2024)
- Student to teacher ratio: 8.17
- Campus type: Rural
- Colors: Purple and Old gold
- Athletics conference: 3A Region 1 (football); 3A Region 4 (basketball, baseball, softball, track and field);3A West (volleyball)
- Sports: Baseball, basketball (B/G), competitive cheer, American football, golf (B/G), softball, athletics (B/G), volleyball, tennis (B/G), cross-country, weightlifting
- Mascot: Bearcat
- Team name: Booneville Bearcats (boys), Booneville Ladycats (girls)
- Affiliations: Arkansas Activities Association
- Website: www.booneville.k12.ar.us/o/booneville-high-school

Booneville High School is a comprehensive public secondary school located in Booneville, Arkansas, United States, for students in grades nine through twelve. Booneville is one of four public high schools in Logan County and the only high school administered by the Booneville School District.

== Academics ==
=== Curriculum ===
The assumed course of study for students is to complete the Smart Core curriculum developed by the Arkansas Department of Education (ADE), which requires students complete at least 22 units for graduation. Course offerings include regular and advanced placement classes and exams with opportunities for college credit via AP exam or via concurrent credit at University of Arkansas Community College at Morrilton and Arkansas Tech University. The school is accredited by the ADE.

=== Fine arts ===
Students may participate in various musical and performing arts including art club, band (e.g., concert band, jazz band), choir, and theater.

== Athletics ==
The Booneville High School mascot is the Bearcat with the school colors of purple and old gold.

For the 2012–14 seasons, the Booneville Bearcats participate in the 4A Region 4 Conference. Competition is primarily sanctioned by the Arkansas Activities Association with students competing in American football, volleyball, baseball, basketball (boys and girls), competitive cheer, golf (boys and girls), softball, tennis (boys and girls), track and field (boys and girls), cross-country running, and weightlifting.

Booneville returned to Class 4A for the 2016-18 cycle. Since 2018 the Bearcats compete in Class 3A.

== Notable alumni ==
- Kimberly Foster — actress
- Floyd Speer — professional baseball player
