= Booneville School District (Arkansas) =

School district in Arkansas, United States

Address
- 381 West Seventh Street Booneville, Arkansas, 72927; United States

District information
- Type: Public
- Grades: PreK–12
- NCES District ID: 0503450

Students and staff
- Students: 1,256
- Teachers: 108.12
- Staff: 108.53
- Student–teacher ratio: 11.62

Other information
- Website: www.booneville.k12.ar.us

Booneville School District is a public school district based in Booneville, Logan County, Arkansas. The school district serves more than 1,300 students in kindergarten through grade 12 and employs more than 220 faculty and staff at its three schools.

The district encompasses 218.87 square miles (566.9 km^{2}) of land in Logan, Scott, and Sebastian counties serving all or portions of the Booneville, Magazine and Waldron.

== Schools ==
=== Secondary education ===
- Booneville High School, serving grades 10 through 12.
- Booneville Junior High School, serving grades 7 through 9.

=== Elementary education ===
- Booneville Elementary School, serving kindergarten through grade 6.
