= J. D. Leftwich High School =

Magazine High School

Location
- 292 East Priddy Street; Magazine, Arkansas 72943; United States
- Coordinates: 35°8′59″N 93°48′15″W

Information
- School type: Public comprehensive
- Status: Open
- School district: Magazine School District
- Superintendent: Beth Shumate
- CEEB code: 041490
- NCES School ID: 050915000650
- Principal: Matthew "Matt" Binford
- Teaching staff: 24.88 (on FTE basis)
- Grades: 7–12
- Enrollment: 266 (2010–11)
  - Grade 7: 45
  - Grade 8: 39
  - Grade 9: 42
  - Grade 10: 53
  - Grade 11: 50
  - Grade 12: 37
- Student to teacher ratio: 10.69
- Education system: ADE Smart Core
- Classes offered: Regular, Advanced Placement (AP), Virtual Arkansas (VA)
- Colors: Red and black
- Athletics conference: 2A Region 4 (Football); 2A Region 4 East (Basketball)
- Mascot: Rattler
- Nickname: Diamondbacks
- Team name: Magazine Rattlers
- Accreditation: ADE
- Communities served: Magazine
- Feeder to: Magazine Elementary School
- Affiliation: Arkansas Activities Association
- Website: www.magazinek12.com/o/magazine-school-district

Magazine High School, formerly known as "J. D. Leftwich High School," is a comprehensive public high school located in Magazine, Arkansas, United States. The school provides secondary education in grades 7 through 12 for students in Magazine and the surrounding unincorporated communities of Logan County, Arkansas. It is one of four public high schools in Logan County and the sole high school administered by the Magazine School District.

Magazine School District has been designated as a Purple Star School by the Purple Star School Program, a designation given to schools who are committed to supporting military families.

== Academics ==
Magazine High School is a Title I school that is accredited by the ADE.

In 2012, Magazine High School was nationally recognized as a bronze medalist in the Best High Schools Report developed by U.S. News & World Report.

=== Curriculum ===
The assumed course of study follows the Smart Core curriculum developed by the Arkansas Department of Education (ADE), which requires that students complete at least 22 units prior to graduation. Students complete regular coursework and exams and may take Advanced Placement (AP) courses and exams, with the opportunity to receive college credit. Virtual Arkansas (VA) courses are also offered at Magazine High School, and some of these courses provide an opportunity to earn college credits.

== Athletics ==
The Magazine High School mascot is the Rattlers, with red and black serving as the school colors. The Magazine Rattlers compete in interscholastic activities within the 2A Classification, the second smallest classification administered by the Arkansas Activities Association. The Rattlers play within the 2A Region 4 Conference in football and 2A Region 4 East in basketball. Magazine fields junior varsity and varsity teams in football, basketball (boys/girls), cheer, baseball, fastpitch softball, and track and field (boys/girls).

As of fall of 2022, Magazine has introduced Volleyball (girls) as a sport. In 2024, they hosted the 2A-3 Junior High Volleyball Conference Tournament in the Diamondback Arena, the formal name for Magazine High School's Gymnasium.
