= John Newton Sarber =

Arkansas politician (1837–1905)

John Sarber

Member of the Arkansas Senate from the 6th district
- In office April 2, 1868 – January 6, 1873
- Preceded by: J.E. Cravens
- Succeeded by: Thomas A. Hanks
- Constituency: Johnson, Newton, and Yell counties

Member of the Arkansas House of Representatives from the 6th district
- In office January 6, 1873 – May 11, 1874 Serving with P. H. Spears, James A. Shrigley
- Preceded by: W.G. Harris
- Succeeded by: A.D. King

Personal details
- Born: October 28, 1837 Pittsburgh, Pennsylvania
- Died: October 21, 1905 (aged 67) Clarksville, Arkansas
- Party: Republican
- Spouse: Susan Rebecca Rose (m. 1867)
- Occupation: Politician, U.S. Marshal
- Nickname(s): General Sarber; Mr. Republican

Military service
- Allegiance: United States of America
- Branch/service: United States Army (Union Army)
- Years of service: 1861–1865
- Rank: Private
- Battles/wars: American Civil War

John Newton Sarber (October 28, 1837 – October 21, 1905) was a Republican politician and a U.S. Marshal in Arkansas during the Reconstruction era. He was a member of Arkansas's 1868 Constitutional Convention and served in the Arkansas General Assembly. Sarber was a leader in legislation establishing Arkansas's public school system, the Arkansas Industrial University, and what became Logan County, Arkansas, which was initially named Sarber County over his objections. When unreconstructed Democrats returned to power, they applied political pressure to Sarber and other carpetbaggers. Sarber resigned from the marshals and Sarber County was renamed for James Logan.

== Early life and military service ==
He was born in Pittsburgh, Pennsylvania. His family was abolitionist and moved to Kansas. They settled in Kansas City when he was 14 and two years later he enlisted at Manhattan, Kansas. He joined the 2nd Kansas Infantry Regiment. He enlisted in 1861 and saw action at the Battle of Old Fort Wayne, Battle of Prairie Grove, Engagement at Cane Hill, and Battle of Devil's Backbone before being discharged in 1865 at the end of the war.

== Political career ==
After the Civil War, Sarber remained in Clarksville, Arkansas. He married Susan Rebecca Rose from an early pioneer and a Confederate supporting family; they had six children that survived to adulthood. Sarber was elected to represent Johnson County, Arkansas at the state constitutional convention which authored the 1868 Arkansas Constitution.

Sarber was elected to the Arkansas Senate, seated in the 17th Arkansas General Assembly in April 1868. He was re-elected to the 18th Arkansas General Assembly. In 1873, Sarber was elected to the Arkansas House of Representatives, representing the 6th district (Newton, Johnson, Yell, and Sarber counties) alongside P. H. Spears and James A. Shrigley. He is not listed on the rolls for the Extraordinary Arkansas General Assembly held during the Brooks-Baxter War in 1874. While in the senate, Sarber introduced bills creating the Arkansas public school system and the Arkansas Industrial University (now known as the University of Arkansas), including serving on the university's initial board of trustees. He introduced a bill to create a new county south of the Arkansas River to keep the Johnson County seat at Clarksville over the objections of those wanting to move it back to Spadra, Arkansas. This was initially named Sarber County, over his objections.

== U.S. Marshal ==
Sarber was nominated by President Ulysses Grant to be a U.S. Marshal for the Western District of Arkansas. During this time, his correspondence incorrectly addressed him as "General Sarber", an error later repeated by other sources and publications. Sarber resigned as U.S. Marshal on June 27, 1874 under pressure from Democrats after they retook control of the state after the Reconstruction era.

== Later life ==
Sarber remained involved in Republican politics in Arkansas, earning the nickname "Mr. Republican". He was a supporter of Powell Clayton and Ulysses Grant. Sarber died at his Clarksville home on October 21, 1905. A portrait of him exists.

== See also ==
- James M. Hinds

== Sources ==
- Priest, Sharon (1998). Runnells, Jonathan (ed.). Historical Report of the Arkansas Secretary of State. Office of the Arkansas Secretary of State. ISBN 9780313302121. OCLC 40157815.
