= Dr. Stephen H. Chism House =

Historic house in Arkansas, United States

- U.S. National Register of Historic Places
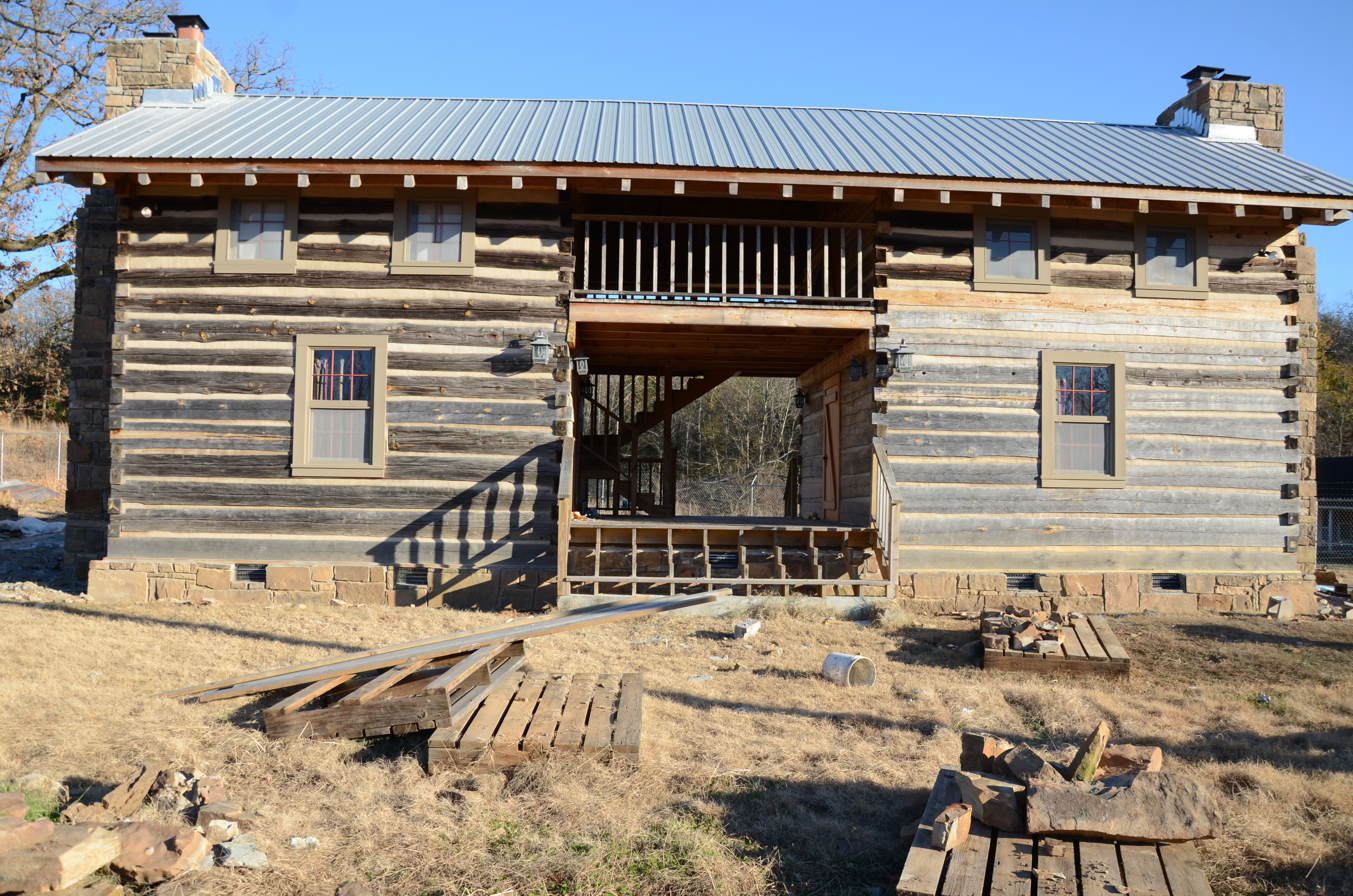

- Location within Arkansas Location within the United States
- Nearest city: Booneville, Arkansas
- Coordinates: 35°13′3″N 93°56′23″W
- Area: less than one acre
- Built: 1844
- Built by: Stephen Chism
- Architectural style: Dogtrot
- NRHP reference No.: 94000853
- Added to NRHP: August 16, 1994

The Dr. Stephen H. Chism House is a historic house in rural Logan County, Arkansas north of Booneville, on the east side of Arkansas Highway 23 about 0.5 miles (0.80 km) south of its junction with Arkansas Highway 217. A two-story log dogtrot house, it has two log pens flanking an open breezeway and a gable roof for cover. Built about 1844–45, it is believed to be the oldest log building in the county. The Arkansas Archives have a negative of the home. Log Builder Paul Glidewell completed the complete restoration of the house in late 2013.

It was home to Dr. Stephen Howard Chism (December 14, 1815 -1883). He was the father of Benjamin Boone Chism. The house was listed on the National Register of Historic Places in 1994.

Chism married Jeanetta Logan, daughter of James Logan for whom Logan County, Arkansas is named.

== See also ==
- National Register of Historic Places listings in Logan County, Arkansas
