= Booneville School District =

Booneville School District may refer to:

- Booneville School District (Arkansas), based in Booneville, Arkansas.
- Booneville School District (Mississippi), based in Booneville, Mississippi.
