= Wolfgang Schlumpf =

Swiss-born Benedictine monk and missionary (1831–1904)

The Reverend Wolfgang Schlumpf OSB
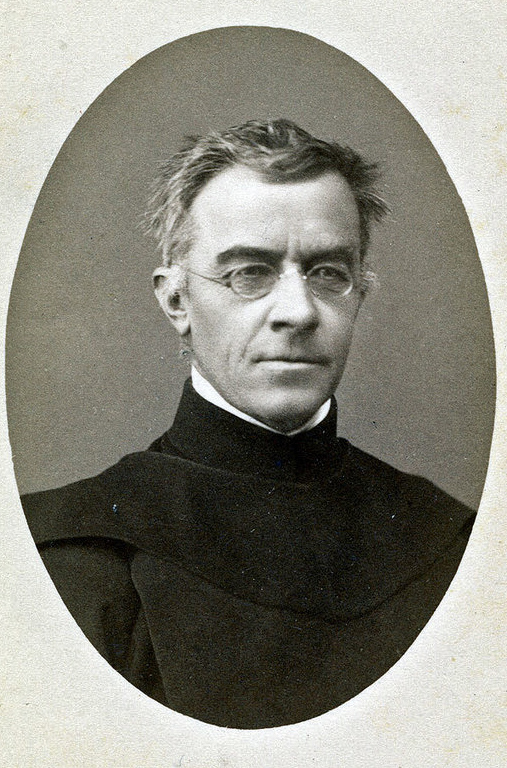

Orders
- Ordination: 1857

Personal details
- Born: January 20, 1831 Steinhausen, Switzerland
- Died: August 1, 1904 (aged 73) Einsiedeln, Switzerland
- Denomination: Roman Catholic
- Occupation: Benedictine Monk

Wolfgang Schlumpf OSB (January 20, 1831 – August 1, 1904) was a Swiss-born Benedictine monk and missionary in the United States who is credited as founder of Subiaco Abbey in western Arkansas. He immigrated to the United States in 1862 after being assigned to what became St. Meinrad Abbey in 1870 in southern Indiana. (It became an Archabbey in 1954).

In 1878 Father Wolfgang was assigned as prior to the foundation of a new monastery in Logan County, western Arkansas, leading two other monks from St. Meinrad in the enterprise. He continued to lead the foundation through its early development, and in 1886 it became an independent conventual priory known as St. Benedict's. In 1891 it was named as an abbey, Subiaco Abbey, by Pope Leo XIII.

== Early life ==
Jacob Anton Schlumpf was born in the Canton of Zug, Switzerland, on January 30, 1831, the son of Franz Philipp Schlumpf and Klara Kristina Betz, farmers. After completing the classical course in high school, he entered Einsiedeln Abbey in 1850, which was operated by the Benedictine Order.

== Monk and priest ==
Schlumpf made his profession of vows with the Benedictines of Einsiedeln Abbey on September 25, 1853, receiving the name "Wolfgang". He was ordained to the priesthood on September 13, 1857. He was appointed a teacher in the Abbey’s high school, serving from December 22, 1858, until April 28, 1862.

On October 12, 1862, Abbot Henry Schmid of Einsiedeln Abbey assigned him as a missionary to the United States at a monastery in southern Indiana. Einsiedeln had founded this monastery in 1854 in Indiana, but it was still developing as a priory.

== United States of America ==
Upon his arrival in southern Indiana in November 1862, Schlumpf was assigned to parish ministry for a few years. In 1865, he was appointed as manager of the monastery's building and farming operations. He directed the construction of a new stone monastery building. Shortly after St. Meinrad Abbey was raised by the Holy See to the status of an Abbey on September 30, 1870, Schlumpf was appointed Subprior (second assistant to its first Abbot, Martin Marty).

In March 1878, Abbot Marty assigned Fr Wolfgang to lead a new monastic foundation in Logan County, western Arkansas. Marty had made an agreement with the Little Rock and Fort Smith Railroad to establish a monastery and school in the area, conditional on the railroad's granting of 640 acres (260 ha) for that purpose from lands they controlled. While Bishop Edward Fitzgerald of the Diocese of Little Rock had no authority over such an agreement, he supported the proposal because he needed German-speaking priests to serve new immigrants to the region. The railroad also granted 100 acres (40 ha) to Marty for a monastery (or convent) for Benedictine sisters.

Fr Wolfgang and two monk missionaries, Brothers Hilarin Benetz and Caspar Hildesheim, reached the proposed site of the new monastery on March 15, 1878. It became known as St. Benedict’s Priory and served area German immigrants. Eventually it developed as the heart of a new settlement.

Fr. Wolfgang served here as Prior until 1881, when he was recalled to St. Meinrad Abbey by the new Abbot, Fintan Mundwiler. There he served again as Subprior and business manager. In 1884 Fr. Wolfgang returned to Switzerland for health reasons.

The following year, he returned to St. Benedict's in Arkansas as Prior. He served in this role as the new monastery became an independent conventual priory in May 1886. In August 1891 it was named as an Abbey by Pope Leo XIII, with the name of Subiaco Abbey. It was named for Subiaco, Italy, where St. Benedict established his first monastery in the early 6th century.

== Final years ==
In September 1894, when Fr Wolfgang was 63, he was recalled to Switzerland by Abbot Basil Oberholzer of Einsiedeln Abbey. There Fr. Wolfgang was appointed as chaplain of the Benedictine nuns in Glattburg. In September 1902, he returned to Einsiedeln Abbey. He died there on August 1, 1904.

== Notability ==
While living as a Benedictine monk and helping develop Subiaco Abbey, Fr. Wolfgang served as a major missionary for Roman Catholics in the state of Arkansas. Under his leadership, Catholic churches were founded in the following cities: Subiaco, Shoal Creek, Morrison Bluff, Paris, Ratcliff, Charleston, and Fort Smith. He also led the monastic community in taking over the pastoral care of other Catholic churches in Arkansas: in Altus, Coal Hill, Clarksville, and Hartman.

== Gallery ==
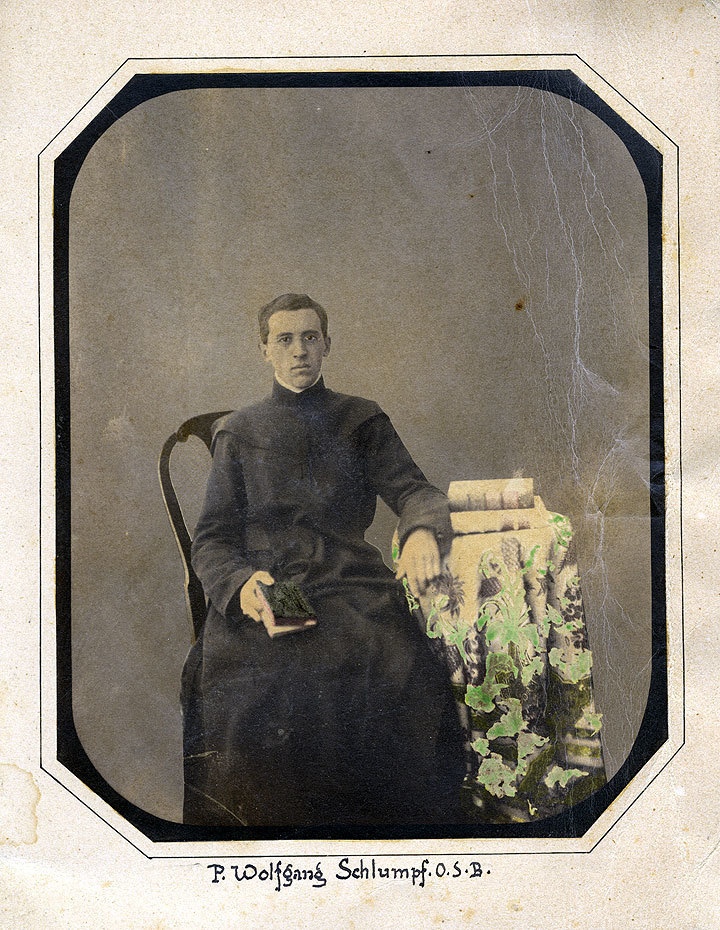

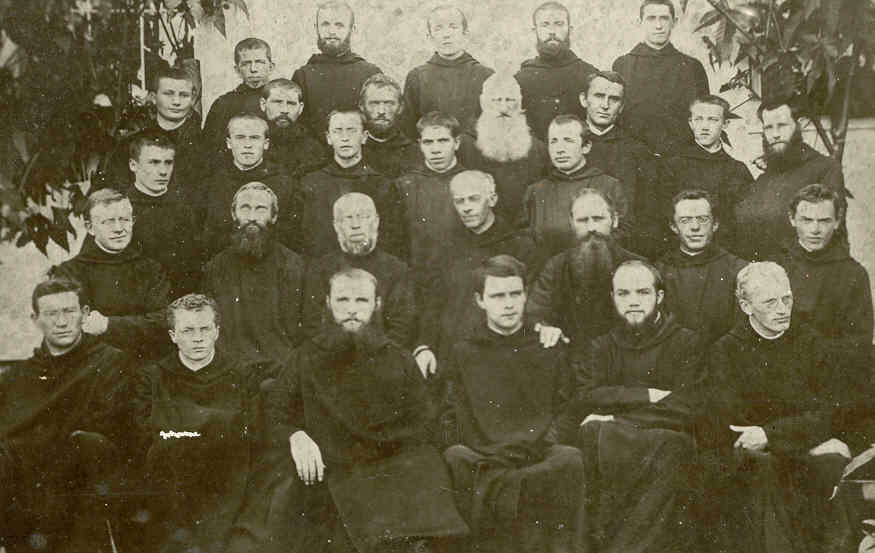

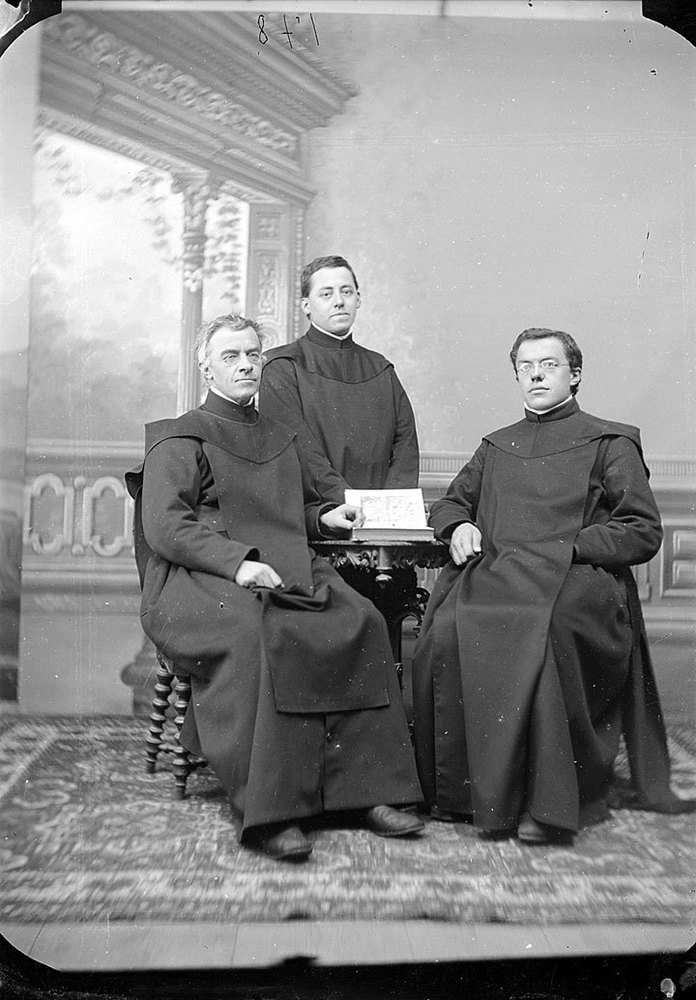

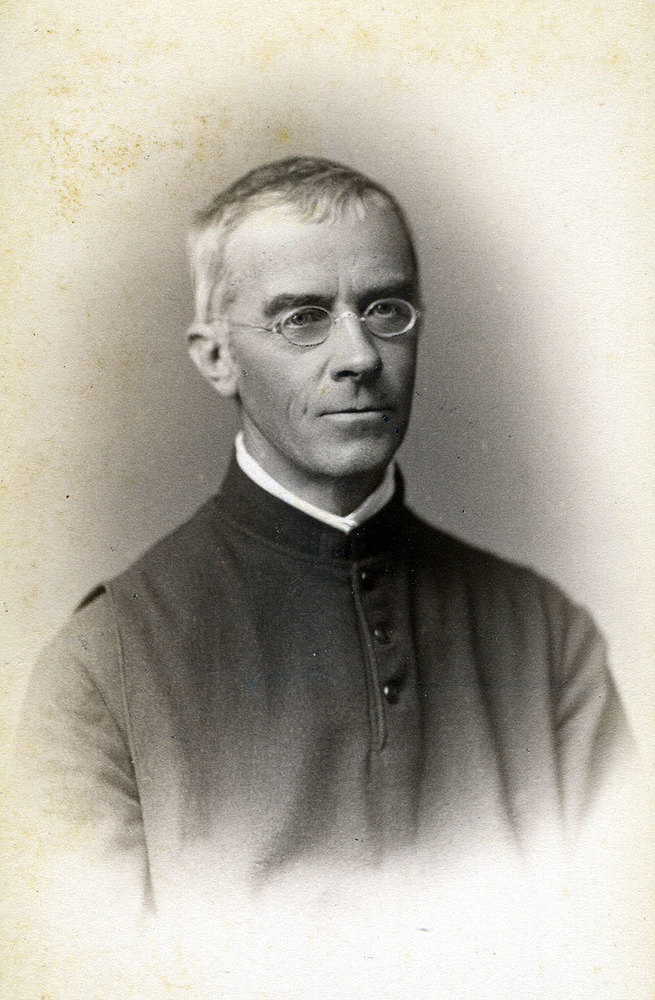
