= Scranton High School (Arkansas) =

Location
- 103 North Tenth Street; Scranton, Arkansas 72863; United States
- Coordinates: 35°21′40″N 93°32′27″W

Information
- School type: Public comprehensive
- Status: Open
- School district: Scranton School District
- Superintendent: Toby Cook
- CEEB code: 041814
- NCES School ID: 051218000981
- Principal: Doyle Watkins
- Teaching staff: 22.55 (on FTE basis)
- Grades: 7–12
- Enrollment: 207 (2023–2024)
- Student to teacher ratio: 9.18
- Education system: ADE Smart Core
- Classes offered: Regular, Advanced Placement (AP)
- Colors: Purple and gold
- Athletics conference: 1A West
- Mascot: Rocket
- Team name: Scranton Rockets
- Accreditation: ADE
- Affiliation: Arkansas Activities Association
- Website: www.scrantonrockets.net/page/scranton-high-school

Scranton High School is a comprehensive public high school located in Scranton, Arkansas, United States. The school provides secondary education in grades 7 through 12 for approximately 67.52 square miles (174.9 km^{2}) of land in Logan County, Arkansas. It is one of four public high schools in Logan County and the sole high school administered by the Scranton School District.

The school district, and therefore the high school's attendance boundary, includes all of Scranton, all of Morrison Bluff, and most of Subiaco.

== Academics ==
Scranton High School is a Title I school that is accredited by the Arkansas Department of Education (ADE).

The assumed course of study follows the ADE Smart Core curriculum, which requires students complete at least 22 units prior to graduation. Students complete regular (core and career focus) coursework and exams and may take Advanced Placement (AP) courses and exam that provide the opportunity to receive college credit.

== Athletics ==
The Scranton High School mascot and athletic emblem is the Rocket with purple and gold serving as the school colors.

The Scranton Rockets compete in interscholastic activities within the 1A Classification, the state's smallest classification administered by the Arkansas Activities Association. The Rockets play within the 1A Region 4 Conference.

Scranton fields junior varsity and varsity teams in golf (boys/girls), basketball (boys/girls), baseball, softball, track and field (boys/girls), and cheer.

- Basketball: The girls basketball team won the Class 1A state basketball championship in 2009.
- Baseball: The baseball team won its first Class 1A state baseball championship in 2001.
- Softball: The fastpitch softball team won its first Class 1A state softball championship in 2009.
- Track and field: The girls track team are 4-time state track and field champions (1979, 1984, 1990, 1991).
