= Scranton School District =

Scranton School District may refer to:

- Scranton School District (Arkansas), a school district in Scranton, Arkansas
- Scranton School District (North Dakota), a school district in Scranton, North Dakota
- Scranton School District (Pennsylvania), a large, urban school district in Scranton, Pennsylvania
