= Floyd Speer =

American baseball player (1913–1969)

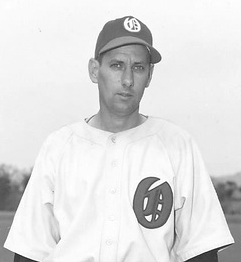
- Speer, circa 1947
- Relief pitcher
- Born: January 27, 1913; Booneville, Arkansas, U.S.
- Died: March 22, 1969 (aged 56); Little Rock, Arkansas, U.S.
- Batted: Right Threw: Right

MLB debut
- April 25, 1943, for the Chicago White Sox

Last MLB appearance
- May 3, 1944, for the Chicago White Sox

MLB statistics
- Games played: 3
- Strikeouts: 2
- Earned run average: 9.00
- Stats at Baseball Reference

Teams
- Chicago White Sox (1943–1944)

Vernie Floyd Speer (January 27, 1913 – March 22, 1969) was an American professional baseball pitcher. He was born on January 27, 1913, in Booneville, Arkansas. He attended Booneville High School, where he starred in baseball. His twin brother, Bernie Loyd Speer, was often his catcher.

Floyd began his professional baseball career in 1938 in the now-defunct Cotton States League. He moved to play for Shreveport in the Texas League in 1941. At the age of 30, Speer broke into the big leagues on April 25, 1943, with the Chicago White Sox. He played his last game with the Sox on May 3, 1944. He later played for other minor league teams, including the St. Paul Saints in 1943, the Milwaukee Brewers in 1945 and the Oakland Oaks in 1946–48.

Vernie Floyd Speer married Rosadell McConnell, who was also from Booneville, Arkansas.

Speer returned to Arkansas where he died in Little Rock on March 22, 1969. He was 56 years old. Speers was returned to his hometown of Booneville, where he was buried in the Carolan Community Cemetery, 5 miles outside of town.

== Sources ==
- Career statistics from MLB · Baseball Reference · Baseball Reference (Minors) · Retrosheet · Baseball Almanac
