= List of Arkansas locations by per capita income =

Arkansas is the 48th richest state in the United States of America, with a per capita income of $16,904 (2000).

== Arkansas Counties Ranked by Per Capita Income ==
Note: Data is from the 2010 United States Census Data and the 2006-2010 American Community Survey 5-Year Estimates.

Rank	County	Per capita income	Median household income	Median family income	Population	Number of households
	United States	$27,334	$51,914	$62,982	308,745,538	116,716,292
1	Pulaski	$27,158	$45,121	$57,863	382,748	158,772
2	Benton	$25,186	$50,434	$58,000	221,339	82,087
3	Saline	$24,584	$51,502	$62,109	107,118	41,441
4	Faulkner	$22,811	$45,287	$60,595	113,237	42,614
5	Garland	$22,786	$36,844	$45,745	96,024	40,994
6	Lonoke	$22,473	$50,757	$57,736	68,356	25,295
7	Washington	$22,421	$42,303	$52,300	203,065	76,389
8	Sebastian	$22,284	$39,482	$49,149	125,744	49,599
9	Grant	$22,229	$51,589	$58,741	17,853	6,933
10	Arkansas	$22,142	$37,230	$48,698	19,019	8,005
11	Craighead	$21,728	$39,233	$52,540	96,443	37,291
12	Baxter	$21,513	$35,606	$42,124	41,513	18,748
	Arkansas	$21,274	$39,267	$48,491	2,915,918	1,147,084
13	Nevada	$21,020	$38,375	$46,658	8,997	3,697
14	White	$20,900	$39,178	$46,012	77,076	29,342
15	Boone	$20,507	$36,977	$46,005	36,903	15,120
16	Union	$20,447	$36,464	$46,185	41,639	16,951
17	Cleburne	$20,371	$35,753	$44,863	25,970	11,078
18	Columbia	$20,110	$35,148	$46,855	24,552	9,759
19	Montgomery	$20,010	$35,705	$43,306	9,487	4,000
20	Independence	$19,912	$34,625	$43,775	36,647	14,391
21	Conway	$19,909	$32,700	$48,116	21,273	8,463
22	Perry	$19,844	$43,635	$50,364	10,445	4,170
23	Carroll	$19,743	$34,235	$42,031	27,446	11,393
24	Pope	$19,693	$39,841	$46,083	61,754	23,353
25	Miller	$19,654	$40,307	$47,960	43,462	17,219
26	Marion	$19,532	$34,109	$41,321	16,653	7,411
27	Cleveland	$19,481	$36,957	$45,882	8,689	3,416
28	Logan	$19,121	$37,551	$48,696	22,353	8,704
29	Drew	$18,903	$32,558	$44,680	18,509	7,360
30	Clay	$18,892	$29,066	$39,758	16,083	6,845
31	Bradley	$18,845	$29,908	$39,125	11,508	4,673
32	Little River	$18,808	$33,416	$45,341	13,171	5,411
33	Ashley	$18,779	$34,934	$46,453	21,853	8,765
34	Randolph	$18,751	$30,222	$43,552	17,969	7,299
35	Crawford	$18,715	$40,197	$46,542	61,948	23,447
36	Jefferson	$18,681	$35,998	$46,626	77,435	28,873
37	Madison	$18,611	$36,502	$42,341	15,717	6,174
38	Woodruff	$18,344	$27,186	$36,917	7,260	3,134
39	Cross	$18,248	$37,021	$46,045	17,870	7,002
40	Hot Spring	$18,248	$37,150	$46,090	32,923	12,664
41	Ouachita	$18,244	$31,259	$42,771	26,120	11,003
42	Crittenden	$18,241	$33,716	$42,042	50,902	19,026
43	Greene	$18,225	$38,209	$45,776	42,090	16,425
44	Howard	$18,216	$34,554	$40,538	13,789	5,365
45	Prairie	$18,134	$35,346	$42,609	8,715	3,685
46	Pike	$18,122	$32,806	$39,526	11,291	4,457
47	Franklin	$18,010	$32,064	$39,723	18,125	7,037
48	Van Buren	$17,999	$31,960	$40,161	17,295	7,433
49	Izard	$17,737	$31,673	$39,668	13,696	5,731
50	Mississippi	$17,736	$33,407	$39,644	46,480	17,741
51	Lafayette	$17,699	$27,515	$37,072	7,645	3,150
52	Scott	$17,668	$36,417	$39,425	11,233	4,368
53	Desha	$17,582	$29,051	$36,349	13,008	5,321
54	Clark	$17,186	$31,968	$45,336	22,995	8,783
55	Hempstead	$17,177	$35,708	$41,820	22,609	8,839
56	Monroe	$17,084	$29,964	$35,532	8,149	3,481
57	Fulton	$17,067	$30,598	$36,489	12,245	5,196
58	Johnson	$16,937	$30,592	$39,226	25,540	9,812
59	Polk	$16,913	$32,267	$37,883	20,662	8,450
60	Poinsett	$16,625	$32,267	$38,865	24,583	9,754
61	Sharp	$16,570	$31,135	$39,435	17,264	7,360
62	Calhoun	$16,457	$32,450	$39,615	5,368	2,262
63	Dallas	$16,457	$29,602	$37,060	8,116	3,280
64	Yell	$16,345	$36,606	$39,517	22,185	8,219
65	Stone	$16,090	$30,380	$36,765	12,394	5,325
66	Newton	$15,904	$27,441	$37,938	8,330	3,571
67	Sevier	$15,590	$34,383	$39,263	17,058	5,975
68	Searcy	$15,298	$28,811	$38,662	8,195	3,574
69	Phillips	$15,244	$27,361	$32,902	21,757	8,491
70	Lawrence	$15,168	$30,288	$38,957	17,415	6,938
71	Lincoln	$15,024	$35,737	$39,493	14,134	4,207
72	Jackson	$14,874	$27,615	$36,103	17,997	6,724
73	Chicot	$14,668	$21,676	$32,679	11,800	4,579
74	St. Francis	$13,693	$27,019	$34,233	28,258	9,616
75	Lee	$13,103	$30,494	$34,261	10,424	3,624
