= Tokalon, Arkansas =

- Unincorporated community
- Location within Arkansas Location within the United States
- Coordinates: 35°22′35″N 93°28′17″W
- Country: United States
- State: Arkansas
- County: Logan
- Elevation: 436 ft (133 m)
- Time zone: UTC-6 (Central (CST))
  - Summer (DST): UTC-5 (CDT)
- Area code: 479
- GNIS feature ID: 55588

Tokalon is an unincorporated community in Logan County, Arkansas, United States.
