= Morrison Bluff, Arkansas =

- Town
- Location in Logan County, Arkansas
- Coordinates: 35°22′58″N 93°31′22″W
- Country: United States
- State: Arkansas
- County: Logan

Area
  - Total: 1.36 sq mi (3.51 km^{2})
  - Land: 1.34 sq mi (3.47 km^{2})
  - Water: 0.015 sq mi (0.04 km^{2})
- Elevation: 381 ft (116 m)

Population (2020)
  - Total: 78
  - Estimate (2025): 83 ▲
  - Density: 58.2/sq mi (22.46/km^{2})
- Time zone: UTC-6 (Central (CST))
  - Summer (DST): UTC-5 (CDT)
- FIPS code: 05-47030
- GNIS feature ID: 2406197

Morrison Bluff is a town in Logan County, Arkansas, United States. As of the 2020 census, Morrison Bluff had a population of 78.

== Geography ==
Morrison Bluff is located in northern Logan County and is bordered to the north by an arm of Lake Dardanelle, an impoundment on the Arkansas River. State Highway 109 passes through the town, leading south 2 miles (3 km) to Scranton and north across the Arkansas River 5 miles (8 km) to U.S. Route 64 at a point 4 miles (6 km) west of Clarksville.

According to the United States Census Bureau, the town of Morrison Bluff has a total area of 1.3 square miles (3.4 km^{2}), of which 0.02 square miles (0.04 km^{2}), or 1.18%, are water.

== Demographics ==
Historical population
Census	Pop.	Note	%±
1970	49		—
1980	69		40.8%
1990	84		21.7%
2000	74		−11.9%
2010	64		−13.5%
2020	78		21.9%
2025 (est.)	83	▲	6.4%
U.S. Decennial Census

As of the census of 2000, there were 74 people, 29 households, and 18 families residing in the town. The population density was 26.0 people/km^{2} (67 people/mi^{2}). There were 32 housing units at an average density of 11.2 units/km^{2} (29 units/mi^{2}). The racial makeup of the town was 94.59% White, 4.05% Black or African American, and 1.35% from two or more races.

There were 29 households, out of which 27.6% had children under the age of 18 living with them, 51.7% were married couples living together, 6.9% had a female householder with no husband present, and 34.5% were non-families. 31.0% of all households were made up of individuals, and 13.8% had someone living alone who was 65 years of age or older. The average household size was 2.55 and the average family size was 3.11.

In the town, the population was spread out, with 24.3% under the age of 18, 10.8% from 18 to 24, 20.3% from 25 to 44, 28.4% from 45 to 64, and 16.2% who were 65 years of age or older. The median age was 39 years. For every 100 females, there were 100.0 males. For every 100 females age 18 and over, there were 100.0 males.

The median income for a household in the town was $78,750, and the median income for a family was $91,875. Males had a median income of $22,500 versus $16,875 for females. The per capita income for the town was $56,436, which is the highest per capita income in the state. There were no families and 4.7% of the population living below the poverty line, including no under eighteens and 22.2% of those over 64.

== Education ==
It is in the Scranton School District. The district's comprehensive high school is Scranton High School.
