= Prairie View, Arkansas =

- Unincorporated community
- Location within Arkansas Location within the United States
- Coordinates: 35°20′04″N 93°31′05″W
- Country: United States
- State: Arkansas
- County: Logan
- Elevation: 423 ft (129 m)
- Time zone: UTC-6 (Central (CST))
  - Summer (DST): UTC-5 (CDT)
- Area code: 479
- GNIS feature ID: 78094

Prairie View is an unincorporated community in Logan County, Arkansas, United States. Prairie View is located at the junction of Arkansas highways 109 and 288, 2 miles (3.2 km) south-southeast of Scranton.
