= List of lakes of Logan County, Arkansas =

There are at least 34 named lakes and reservoirs in Logan County, Arkansas.

== Lakes ==
- Keenan Lake, 35°02′58″N 093°59′47″W, el. 538 feet (164 m)
- Lake Takima, 35°02′37″N 094°04′24″W, el. 581 feet (177 m)
- Scott Lake, 35°05′39″N 093°46′49″W, el. 397 feet (121 m)

== Reservoirs ==
- Blue Mountain Lake, 35°05′59″N 093°42′02″W, el. 384 feet (117 m)
- Boneville Lake, 35°10′04″N 093°55′11″W, el. 630 feet (190 m)
- Booneville Lake, 35°08′52″N 094°03′36″W, el. 535 feet (163 m)
- Booneville Reservoir, 35°10′04″N 093°55′11″W, el. 630 feet (190 m)
- Caney Lake, 35°14′46″N 093°53′16″W, el. 453 feet (138 m)
- Cove Lake, 35°13′30″N 093°37′01″W, el. 1,017 feet (310 m)
- Fletcher Lake, 35°12′36″N 093°52′35″W, el. 591 feet (180 m)
- Hewitt Lake, 35°17′24″N 093°53′01″W, el. 400 feet (120 m)
- Hope Lake, 35°13′38″N 093°43′35″W, el. 699 feet (213 m)
- Lake Dardanelle, 35°21′14″N 093°23′46″W, el. 338 feet (103 m)
- Lake Number Eight, 35°18′06″N 093°54′31″W, el. 446 feet (136 m)
- Lake Number Three, 35°15′40″N 093°52′50″W, el. 476 feet (145 m)
- Lake Number Two, 35°15′49″N 093°49′47″W, el. 512 feet (156 m)
- Owens Lake, 35°21′58″N 093°34′53″W, el. 436 feet (133 m)
- Paris Reservoir, 35°16′19″N 093°43′09″W, el. 466 feet (142 m)
- Parker Lake, 35°12′23″N 093°55′03″W, el. 531 feet (162 m)
- Sixmile Creek Watershed Site 10 Reservoir, 35°12′41″N 093°57′48″W, el. 548 feet (167 m)
- Sixmile Creek Watershed Site 11 Reservoir, 35°13′35″N 093°59′17″W, el. 509 feet (155 m)
- Sixmile Creek Watershed Site 12 Reservoir, 35°13′42″N 094°00′41″W, el. 509 feet (155 m)
- Sixmile Creek Watershed Site Five Reservoir, 35°13′41″N 093°54′44″W, el. 489 feet (149 m)
- Sixmile Creek Watershed Site Four Reservoir, 35°14′46″N 093°53′16″W, el. 453 feet (138 m)
- Sixmile Creek Watershed Site Nine Reservoir, 35°11′42″N 093°57′19″W, el. 538 feet (164 m)
- Sixmile Creek Watershed Site Seven Reservoir, 35°12′23″N 093°55′03″W, el. 531 feet (162 m)
- Sixmile Creek Watershed Site Three Reservoir, 35°15′40″N 093°52′50″W, el. 476 feet (145 m)
- Sixmile Creek Watershed Site Two Reservoir, 35°15′54″N 093°49′55″W, el. 515 feet (157 m)
- Subiaco Reservoir, 35°16′52″N 093°38′41″W, el. 617 feet (188 m)
- Subiaco Reservoir, 35°16′57″N 093°38′14″W, el. 597 feet (182 m)
- Tritt Lake, 35°23′43″N 093°29′04″W, el. 338 feet (103 m)
- Upper Petit Jean Site Number Nine Reservoir, 35°08′18″N 094°03′31″W, el. 525 feet (160 m)
- Watson Lake, 35°16′08″N 093°53′23″W, el. 404 feet (123 m)
- Williams Lake, 35°11′42″N 093°57′27″W, el. 538 feet (164 m)

== See also ==
- List of lakes in Arkansas
