= Scranton School District (Arkansas) =

School district in Arkansas, United States

Address
- 103 North Tenth Street Scranton, Arkansas, 72863; United States

District information
- Type: Public
- Grades: K–12
- NCES District ID: 0512180

Students and staff
- Students: 451
- Teachers: 38.51
- Staff: 32.85
- Student–teacher ratio: 11.71

Other information
- Website: www.scrantonrockets.net

Scranton School District (SSD) is a school district in Scranton, Arkansas. The school district provides education in prekindergarten through grade 12 for more than 400 students and employs more than 70 educators and staff for its two schools and district offices. SSD encompasses 67.52 square miles (174.9 km^{2}) of land in Logan County. The district includes all of Scranton, all of Morrison Bluff, and most of Subiaco.

The district and school mascot and athletic emblem is the Rocket, with purple and gold serving as the school colors.

== Schools ==
- Scranton High School, serving grades 7 through 12.
- Scranton Elementary School, serving prekindergarten through grade 6.

Scranton High School is nationally recognized as a bronze medalist in the Best High Schools Report 2012 evaluated by U.S. News & World Report.
