= Midway, Logan County, Arkansas =

Midway, Arkansas
- Unincorporated community
- Location within Arkansas Location within the United States
- Coordinates: 35°17′29″N 93°31′39″W
- Country: United States
- State: Arkansas
- County: Logan
- Elevation: 469 ft (143 m)
- Time zone: UTC-6 (Central (CST))
  - Summer (DST): UTC-5 (CDT)
- Area code: 479
- GNIS feature ID: 72645

Midway is an unincorporated community in Logan County, Arkansas, United States. Midway is located at the junction of Arkansas highways 22 and 109, 6 miles (9.7 km) east of Subiaco.
