= Scranton, Arkansas =

- City
- Location in Logan County, Arkansas
- Coordinates: 35°21′38″N 93°32′22″W
- Country: United States
- State: Arkansas
- County: Logan

Area
  - Total: 0.51 sq mi (1.31 km^{2})
  - Land: 0.51 sq mi (1.31 km^{2})
  - Water: 0 sq mi (0.00 km^{2})
- Elevation: 377 ft (115 m)

Population (2020)
  - Total: 245
  - Estimate (2025): 261 ▲
  - Density: 484.0/sq mi (186.87/km^{2})
- Time zone: UTC-6 (Central (CST))
  - Summer (DST): UTC-5 (CDT)
- ZIP code: 72863
- Area code: 479
- FIPS code: 05-62960
- GNIS feature ID: 2405435

Scranton is a city in Logan County, Arkansas, United States. As of the 2020 census, Scranton had a population of 245. It was named after Scranton, Pennsylvania.

== Geography ==
Scranton is located in northeastern Logan County. Arkansas Highway 197 is Scranton's Main Street and leads southwest 10 miles (16 km) to Subiaco. Arkansas Highway 109 passes through Scranton as 5th Street, leading north 7 miles (11 km) to U.S. Route 64 west of Clarksville and south 5 miles (8 km) to Midway.

According to the United States Census Bureau, Scranton has a total area of 0.5 square miles (1.3 km^{2}), all land.

== Demographics ==
Historical population
Census	Pop.	Note	%±
1920	400		—
1930	332		−17.0%
1940	322		−3.0%
1950	283		−12.1%
1960	229		−19.1%
1970	222		−3.1%
1980	244		9.9%
1990	218		−10.7%
2000	222		1.8%
2010	224		0.9%
2020	245		9.4%
2025 (est.)	261	▲	6.5%
U.S. Decennial Census

As of the census of 2000, there were 222 people, 90 households, and 66 families residing in the city. The population density was 447.4 inhabitants per square mile (172.7/km^{2}). There were 112 housing units at an average density of 225.7 per square mile (87.1/km^{2}). The racial makeup of the city was 97.30% White, 0.90% Black or African American, and 1.80% from two or more races.

There were 90 households, out of which 31.1% had children under the age of 18 living with them, 55.6% were married couples living together, 15.6% had a female householder with no husband present, and 25.6% were non-families. 23.3% of all households were made up of individuals, and 17.8% had someone living alone who was 65 years of age or older. The average household size was 2.47 and the average family size was 2.85.

In the city, the population was spread out, with 23.9% under the age of 18, 12.2% from 18 to 24, 24.3% from 25 to 44, 21.2% from 45 to 64, and 18.5% who were 65 years of age or older. The median age was 39 years. For every 100 females, there were 96.5 males. For every 100 females age 18 and over, there were 87.8 males.

The median income for a household in the city was $26,000, and the median income for a family was $30,313. Males had a median income of $16,875 versus $18,750 for females. The per capita income for the city was $25,970. About 11.5% of families and 17.8% of the population were below the poverty line, including none of those under the age of 18 and 34.2% of those 65 or over.

== Education ==
Public education for elementary and secondary students in Scranton and nearby communities is provided by the Scranton School District, which serves more than 400 students and employs more than 70 educators and staff at its two schools:

- Scranton Elementary School, serving kindergarten through grade 6.
- Scranton High School, serving grades 7 through 12.
