= Carolan, Arkansas =

- Unincorporated community
- Location within Arkansas Location within the United States
- Coordinates: 35°5′37″N 93°58′46″W
- Country: United States of America
- State: Arkansas
- County: Logan County
- Elevation: 522 ft (159 m)
- Time zone: UTC-6 (Central (CST))
  - Summer (DST): UTC-5 (CDT)
- ZIP codes: 72927
- Area code: 479
- GNIS feature ID: 71013

Carolan is an unincorporated community in Logan County, Arkansas, United States. It lies five miles to the southwest of Booneville on State Highway 23. Carolan is named for William Philip Carolan, early farmer and merchant in the area. He was born on April 16, 1800, in South Carolina. He was married on September 12, 1822, in South Carolina to Hannah A. (nee Seeley), who was born on April 5, 1807, in South Carolina. Both died in the community of Carolan, on April 16, 1875, and April 9, 1877, respectively. They are buried in the Carolan Community cemetery. An amusing inscription on William Philip Carolan's tombstone describes him as "Baptist and Democrat".

== The founding family and first business ==
Headstone of William P.Carolan, patriarch and founder of Carolan, AR

Carolan Cemetery, Established 1860.

Carolan General Store, built by Walter "Emmett" Carolan and William "Bill" Walter Carolan

One of William Philip Carolan's son, Samuel "Sam" Thompson Carolan, opened the first general store in the community in 1878, three years after his father's death. "Sam" Carolan also opened a cotton gin and blacksmith shop. He was also the postmaster. Note: William Philip Carolan was born in 1800 in Chester County, South Carolina.

In 1918, Samuel "Sam" Thompson Carolan's son, Walter "Emmett" Carolan took over the business with help of his older son, William "Bill" Walter Carolan. They built the "new" store that included gas pumps and modern conveniences. This building stands today. In 1946, the family business went to Robert "Bob" L. Carolan, William "Bill" Walter Carolan's younger brother. The Carolan General Store sold groceries, clothing, farm and feed supplies, drugs, sporting goods and hardware. The store closed in 1975 with the retirement of Robert "Bob" L. Carolan.

In its heyday, Carolan had a school, and two churches, Baptist and Methodist.
