= Stephen Howard Chism =

American politician

Stephen Howard Chism (December 14, 1815-?) was a doctor and state legislator in Arkansas. He was from Kentucky or Tennessee. Benjamin Boone Chism was a son he had with his wife Jeanetta or Jennatte Logan Chism.

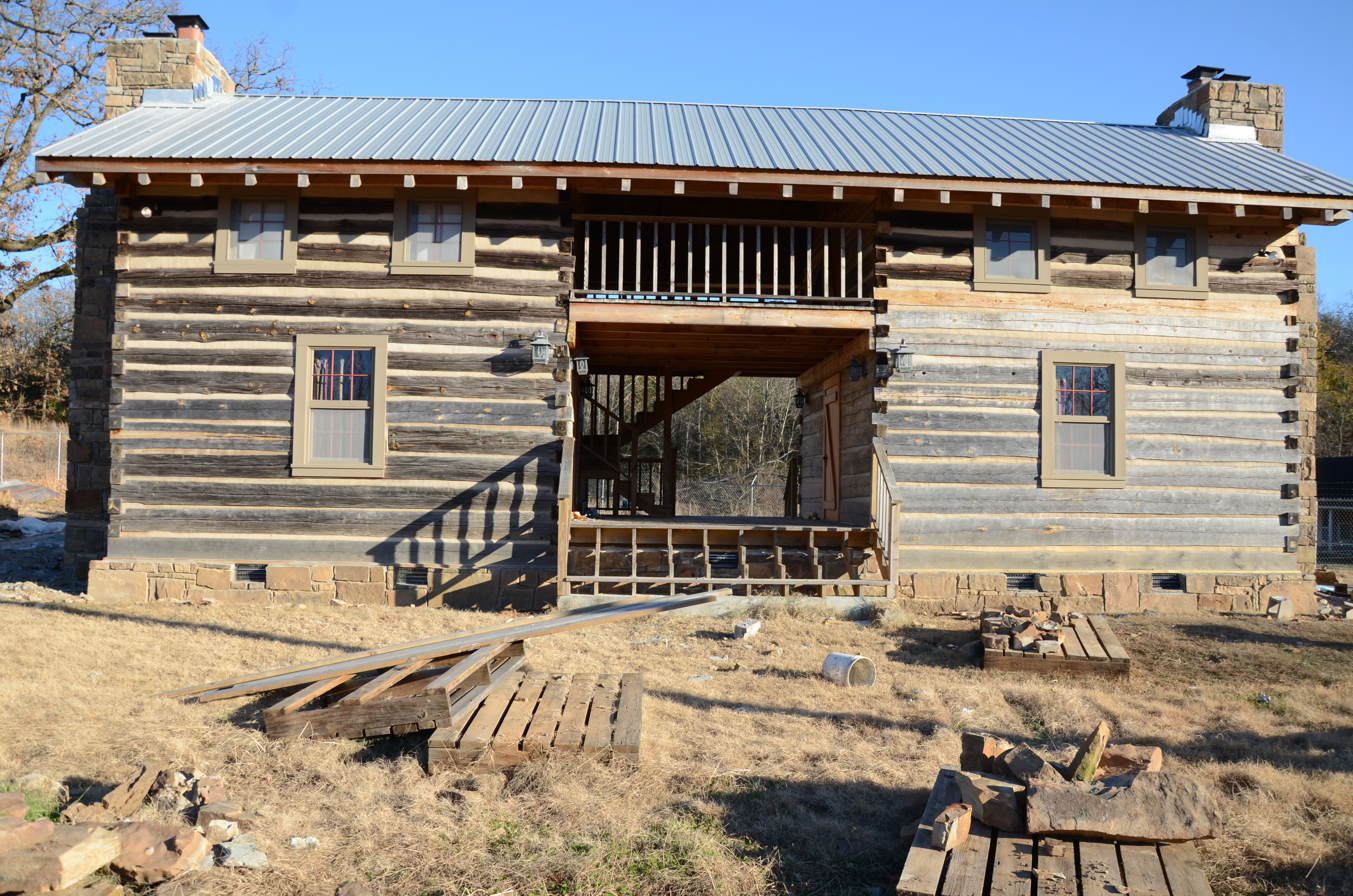
Dr. Stephen H. Chism House

He owned slaves. Chismville was named in honor of him and his family. He served in the Arkansas Senate. He represented Franklin County and Scott County in the Arkansas Senate from 1848 to 1851. His home, the Dr. Stephen H. Chism House, was added to the National Register of Historic Places.

He married Elizabeth Danley.

== See also ==
- Dr. Stephen H. Chism House
