= Magazine, Arkansas =

- City
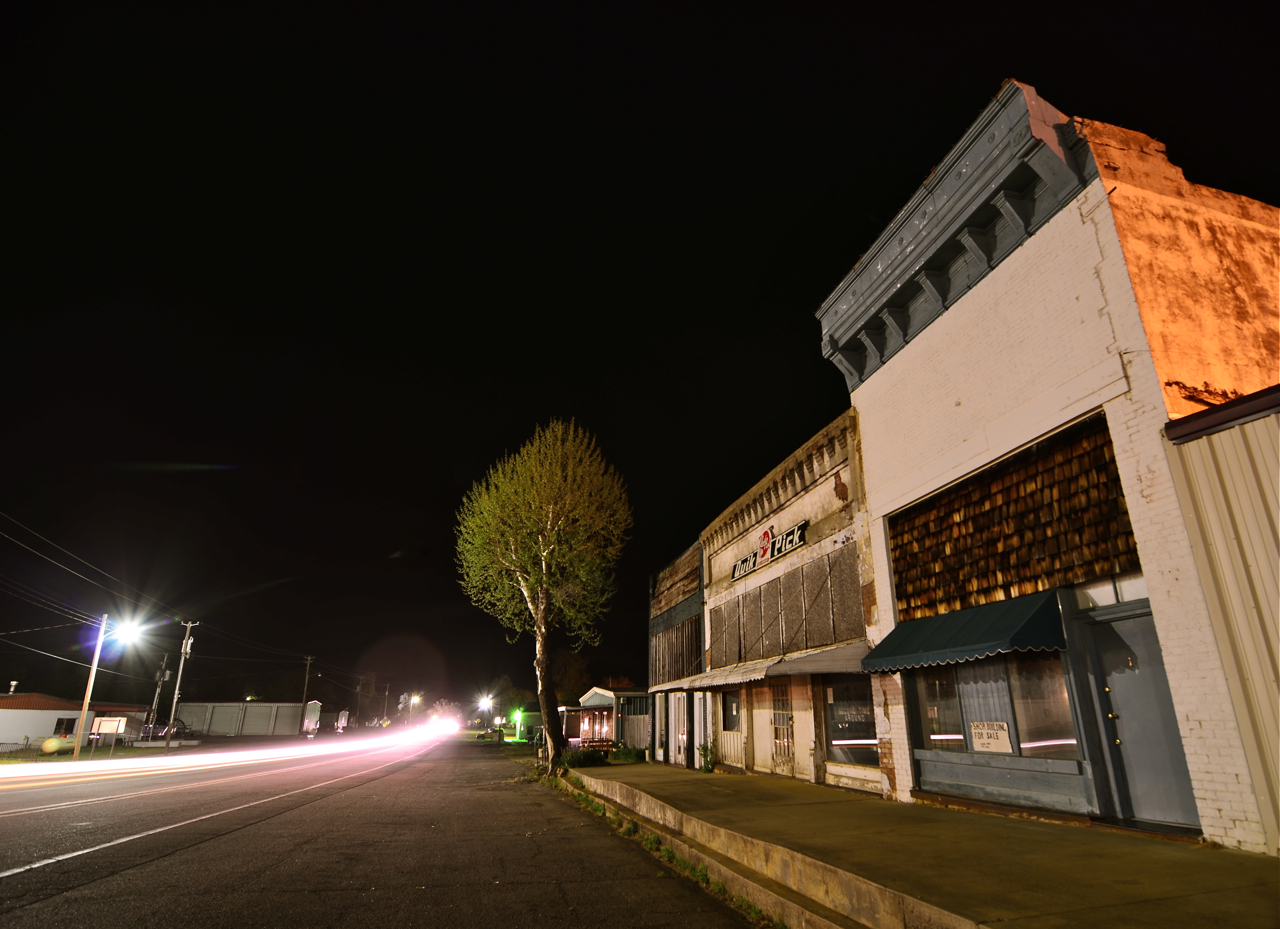
- Magazine at night

- Location of Magazine in Logan County, Arkansas.
- Coordinates: 35°09′12″N 93°48′28″W
- Country: United States
- State: Arkansas
- County: Logan

Area
  - Total: 1.82 sq mi (4.72 km^{2})
  - Land: 1.81 sq mi (4.70 km^{2})
  - Water: 0.0077 sq mi (0.02 km^{2})
- Elevation: 486 ft (148 m)

Population (2020)
  - Total: 740
  - Estimate (2025): 758 ▲
  - Density: 407.5/sq mi (157.34/km^{2})
- Time zone: UTC−06:00 (Central (CST))
  - Summer (DST): UTC−05:00 (CDT)
- ZIP Code: 72943
- Area code: 479
- FIPS code: 05-43310
- GNIS feature ID: 2404996
- Website: www.cityofmagazine.com

Magazine is a city in Logan County, Arkansas, United States. As of the 2020 census, Magazine had a population of 740. The city is named for nearby Mount Magazine.

== Geography ==
According to the United States Census Bureau, the city has a total area of 1.7 square miles (4.4 km^{2}), all land.

== Demographics ==
Historical population
Census	Pop.	Note	%±
1880	478		—
1890	183		−61.7%
1900	897		390.2%
1910	968		7.9%
1920	722		−25.4%
1930	560		−22.4%
1940	385		−31.2%
1950	503		30.6%
1960	463		−8.0%
1970	677		46.2%
1980	799		18.0%
1990	799		0.0%
2000	915		14.5%
2010	847		−7.4%
2020	740		−12.6%
2025 (est.)	758	▲	2.4%
U.S. Decennial Census

As of the census of 2000, there were 915 people, 347 households, and 261 families residing in the city. The population density was 549.6 inhabitants per square mile (212.2/km^{2}). There were 394 housing units at an average density of 236.6 per square mile (91.4/km^{2}). The racial makeup of the city was 97.38% White, 0.66% Native American, 0.11% Asian, 0.22% from other races, and 1.64% from two or more races. 0.66% of the population were Hispanic or Latino of any race.

There were 347 households, out of which 34.3% had children under the age of 18 living with them, 55.0% were married couples living together, 14.1% had a female householder with no husband present, and 24.5% were non-families. 21.6% of all households were made up of individuals, and 13.0% had someone living alone who was 65 years of age or older. The average household size was 2.64 and the average family size was 3.02.

In the city, the population was spread out, with 29.1% under the age of 18, 7.8% from 18 to 24, 25.8% from 25 to 44, 22.2% from 45 to 64, and 15.2% who were 65 years of age or older. The median age was 35 years. For every 100 females, there were 101.1 males. For every 100 females age 18 and over, there were 91.4 males.

The median income for a household in the city was $27,438, and the median income for a family was $31,534. Males had a median income of $23,182 versus $17,656 for females. The per capita income for the city was $14,441. About 13.8% of families and 18.1% of the population were below the poverty line, including 24.5% of those under age 18 and 14.3% of those age 65 or over.

== Education ==
Public education of elementary and secondary school students is provided by the Magazine School District, which leads students to graduate from J. D. Leftwich High School.

== Notable people ==
- Jack Fleck—The winner of the 1955 U.S. Open golf tournament makes his home here.
- Elmo M. Haney—World War I and World War II Marine.
