= James Logan (pioneer) =

American politician

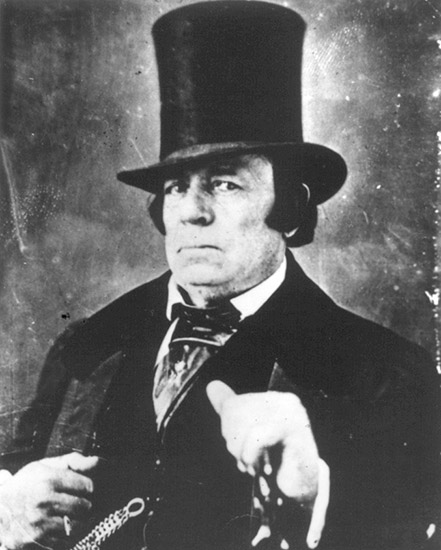

Representative from Scott County in the Arkansas General Assembly
- In office 1836–1838

Representative from Crawford County in the General Assembly of Arkansas Territory
- In office 1834–1836

Personal details
- Born: March 11, 1791 Stanford, Kentucky
- Died: December 6, 1859 (aged 68) Scott County, Arkansas
- Resting place: Logan Cemetery, Sugar Grove, Arkansas

James Logan (March 11, 1791 – December 6, 1859) was an early settler, politician, slaveowner and United States Indian agent in western Arkansas. Logan County was named for him in 1875.

== Early life ==
James Logan was born to David A. and Nancy Thurmond Logan near Stanford, Kentucky. His father David was a cousin of frontiersman Gen. Benjamin Logan, who came to Kentucky with Daniel Boone, and erected a fort at Stanford about the same time Boone erected the first fort. Logan married Rachel [presumed Steele] of Tennessee in Cape Girardeau, Missouri about 1815.

== Career ==
James Logan lived in Wayne County, Missouri, with his wife until 1830, when he came to Arkansas with many from the Logan family and their slaves, settling on the Arkansas River west of Spadra. While there he established Logan's Post Office and was appointed a postmaster on February 11, 1832. When Logan arrived in Arkansas, he took over a large acreage of land and set his slaves to clearing and putting the land into cultivation. In 1839 an epidemic of cholera hit his slaves so he decided to go south of the river. There he acquired 1,000 acres of land on Sugar Creek, near Booneville, which at that time was in Scott County. In 1834 Logan represented the county of Crawford in the Territorial Legislature of Arkansas, and was a representative from Scott County to the Arkansas General Assembly in 1836. Afterwards he was Indian Agent and pay master for the Creek Indian Agency near Fort Gibson. He died November 11, 1857, at his old home on Sugar Creek and his remains are in the family cemetery there.
