= Subiaco, Arkansas =

- Town
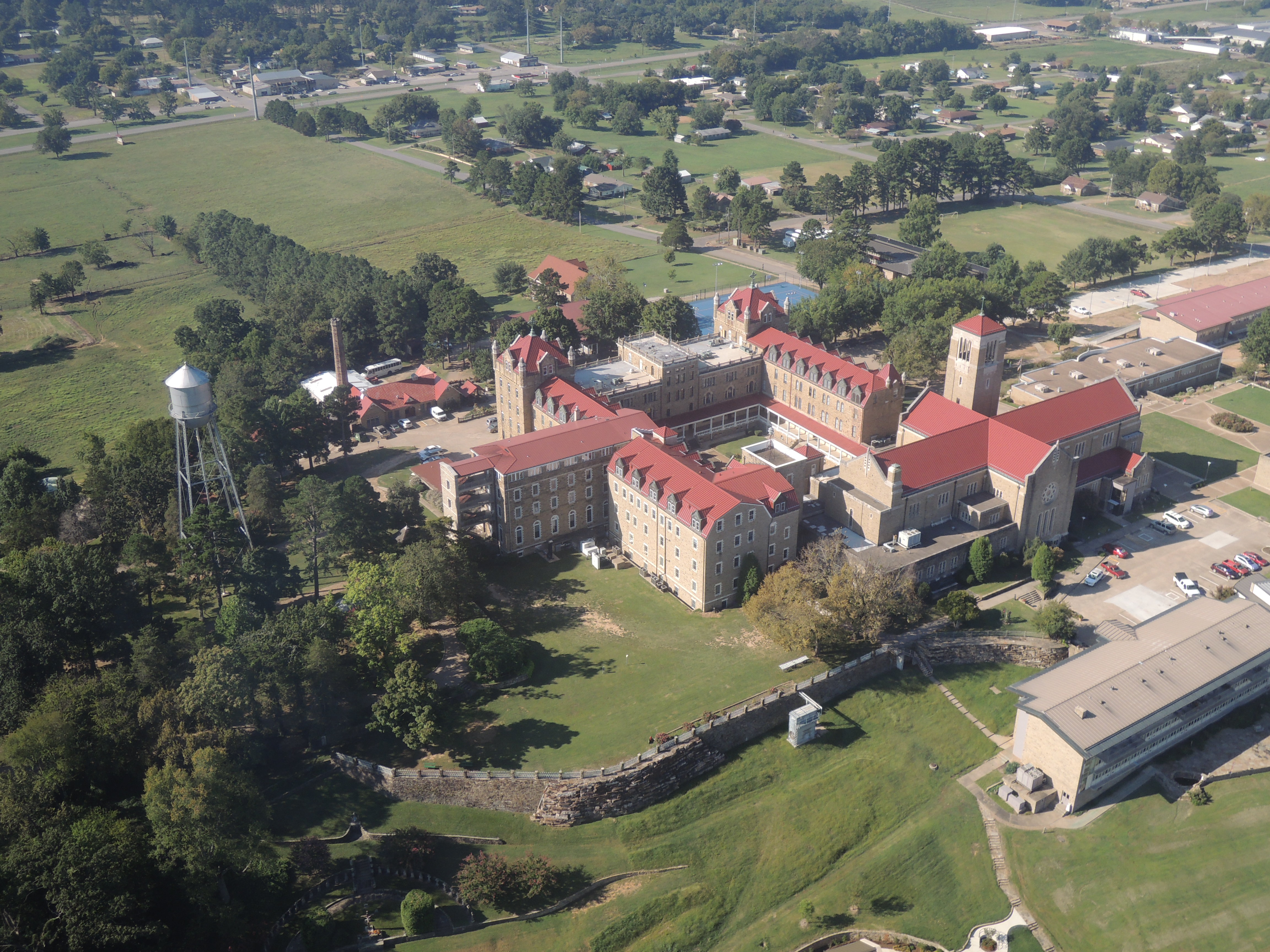
- Aerial view of Subiaco Abbey and town, looking South

- Location of Subiaco in Logan County, Arkansas.
- Coordinates: 35°17′43″N 93°37′29″W
- Country: United States
- State: Arkansas
- County: Logan

Area
  - Total: 1.91 sq mi (4.94 km^{2})
  - Land: 1.89 sq mi (4.90 km^{2})
  - Water: 0.015 sq mi (0.04 km^{2})
- Elevation: 486 ft (148 m)

Population (2020)
  - Total: 401
  - Estimate (2025): 403 ▲
  - Density: 212.0/sq mi (81.84/km^{2})
- Time zone: UTC-6 (Central (CST))
  - Summer (DST): UTC-5 (CDT)
- ZIP code: 72865
- Area code: 479
- FIPS code: 05-67520
- GNIS feature ID: 2406677

Subiaco is a town in Logan County, Arkansas, United States. As of the 2020 census, Subiaco had a population of 401.

The town is named after Subiaco Abbey, which is located there, and which donated 80 acres (32 hectares) in the early 20th century for a townsite and railroad connection. Founded as a priory in 1878, Subiaco Abbey was established and named by Pope Leo XIII in 1891, after the Italian city of that name in the Lazio region, where St. Benedict founded his first monastery. The town celebrated the arrival of its first train in June 1909.

== History ==
The development of both the abbey and the town were related to the expansion of the Little Rock and Fort Smith Railroad (LR&FS) in the area in the late 19th century. In 1877, it owned thousands of acres in Arkansas through federal subsidies for railroad development, and wanted to attract German Catholic immigrants to the region as settlers. The railroad came to an agreement with Abbot Martin Marty, O.S.B., of St. Meinrad Archabbey in Indiana, to grant the abbey land in Logan County to establish a monastery and school to serve the hoped-for settlers. The railroad granted 640 acres (260 ha) to the Benedictines to establish a monastery for monks, and an additional 100 acres (40 ha) to found a convent for Benedictine nuns.

Although the Benedictine abbey and order are independent of the local diocese, as are all Catholic institutes, Edward Fitzgerald, Bishop of Diocese of Little Rock, supported the proposal. He needed German-speaking priests to serve the growing numbers of German immigrants in his diocese.

In March 1878, three monk-missionaries from St. Meinrad Archabbey settled here, founding what became known first as St. Benedict's Priory. Another priest, and eight monastery candidates, joined them the following year. In 1886, the priory became independent of St. Meinrad's, as a conventual priory. In 1891, Pope Leo XIII named the institute as an abbey, to be called Subiaco Abbey, after Subiaco, Italy, where St. Benedict had his first monastery.

German Catholic immigrants did settle in the area, generally working as farmers. They began to lobby for a direct railroad connection. The nearby town of Spierlerville, Arkansas, was the site of the local post office in the region. The Spieler family lobbied for the railroad to pass through their town.

The Prior of Subiaco Abbey, Fr. Wolfgang Schlumpf, O.S.B., had lobbied for the railroad to pass by the Abbey quarry so that it could have a viable commercial enterprise, but the railroad company chose a more level route that passed to the south of the Abbey property.

Subiaco Abbey donated 80 acres (32 ha) of land to form the new town of Subiaco, where a railroad depot could be located. The depot and a new store, established by Conrad Elsken, formed the basis of the settlement. The Subiaco Development Company was established to sell related lands to the general public.

The first train arrived at Subiaco on June 22, 1909, and the official inauguration was on June 30, 1909. Abbot Ignatius Conrad of Subiaco Abbey drove the last spike for the railway connection. Dressed in full vestments, the Abbot also greeted passengers and blessed the train. Festivities included music by both the Subiaco band and the band from nearby Spielerville.

== Geography ==
According to the United States Census Bureau, the town has a total area of 1.9 square miles (4.9 km^{2}), all land.

== Climate ==
The climate in this area is characterized by hot, humid summers and mild to cool winters. According to the Köppen Climate Classification system, Subiaco has a humid subtropical climate, abbreviated "Cfa" on climate maps.

Climate data for Subiaco, Arkansas (1991–2020 normals, extremes 1897–present)
Month	Jan	Feb	Mar	Apr	May	Jun	Jul	Aug	Sep	Oct	Nov	Dec	Year
Record high °F (°C)	83 (28)	88 (31)	95 (35)	96 (36)	103 (39)	110 (43)	115 (46)	117 (47)	109 (43)	100 (38)	88 (31)	81 (27)	117 (47)
Mean maximum °F (°C)	70.3 (21.3)	73.5 (23.1)	81.3 (27.4)	86.4 (30.2)	90.5 (32.5)	94.7 (34.8)	99.5 (37.5)	99.9 (37.7)	94.9 (34.9)	87.9 (31.1)	77.8 (25.4)	71.3 (21.8)	101.5 (38.6)
Mean daily maximum °F (°C)	48.7 (9.3)	54.1 (12.3)	63.0 (17.2)	72.4 (22.4)	80.1 (26.7)	87.9 (31.1)	92.4 (33.6)	91.8 (33.2)	84.6 (29.2)	73.8 (23.2)	61.2 (16.2)	51.2 (10.7)	71.8 (22.1)
Daily mean °F (°C)	38.7 (3.7)	43.0 (6.1)	51.5 (10.8)	60.4 (15.8)	69.3 (20.7)	77.4 (25.2)	81.5 (27.5)	80.4 (26.9)	73.1 (22.8)	62.0 (16.7)	50.1 (10.1)	41.3 (5.2)	60.7 (15.9)
Mean daily minimum °F (°C)	28.6 (−1.9)	31.9 (−0.1)	40.0 (4.4)	48.4 (9.1)	58.5 (14.7)	66.8 (19.3)	70.5 (21.4)	68.9 (20.5)	61.6 (16.4)	50.2 (10.1)	38.9 (3.8)	31.5 (−0.3)	49.7 (9.8)
Mean minimum °F (°C)	13.9 (−10.1)	18.4 (−7.6)	24.1 (−4.4)	34.1 (1.2)	44.6 (7.0)	57.0 (13.9)	62.5 (16.9)	60.7 (15.9)	47.6 (8.7)	34.4 (1.3)	24.4 (−4.2)	18.2 (−7.7)	10.8 (−11.8)
Record low °F (°C)	−16 (−27)	−17 (−27)	7 (−14)	24 (−4)	30 (−1)	45 (7)	50 (10)	47 (8)	34 (1)	21 (−6)	13 (−11)	−4 (−20)	−17 (−27)
Average precipitation inches (mm)	3.49 (89)	2.93 (74)	4.39 (112)	4.79 (122)	5.06 (129)	3.96 (101)	3.76 (96)	4.06 (103)	3.93 (100)	3.96 (101)	4.88 (124)	4.07 (103)	49.28 (1,252)
Average snowfall inches (cm)	0.4 (1.0)	1.0 (2.5)	0.6 (1.5)	0.0 (0.0)	0.0 (0.0)	0.0 (0.0)	0.0 (0.0)	0.0 (0.0)	0.0 (0.0)	0.0 (0.0)	0.0 (0.0)	0.2 (0.51)	2.2 (5.6)
Average precipitation days (≥ 0.01 in)	6.8	7.2	9.0	8.0	9.7	8.2	7.7	6.8	6.4	7.0	7.6	7.4	91.8
Average snowy days (≥ 0.1 in)	0.3	0.5	0.2	0.0	0.0	0.0	0.0	0.0	0.0	0.0	0.0	0.2	1.2
Source: NOAA

== Demographics ==
Historical population
Census	Pop.	Note	%±
1920	181		—
1930	195		7.7%
1940	202		3.6%
1950	191		−5.4%
1960	290		51.8%
1970	375		29.3%
1980	744		98.4%
1990	538		−27.7%
2000	439		−18.4%
2010	572		30.3%
2020	401		−29.9%
2025 (est.)	403	▲	0.5%
U.S. Decennial Census

As of the census of 2000, there were 439 people, 147 households, and 115 families in the town. The population density was 238.3 inhabitants per square mile (92.0/km^{2}). There were 167 housing units at an average density of 90.6 per square mile (35.0/km^{2}). The racial makeup of the town is 93.62% White, 3.64% Black or African American, 0.46% Native American, 0.23% Asian, 0.23% from other races, and 1.82% from two or more races. 0.68% of the population were Hispanic or Latino of any race.

There were 147 households, of which 38.8% had children under the age of 18, 63.9% were married couples living together, 9.5% had a female householder with no husband present, and 21.1% were non-families. 17.7% of all households were made up of individuals, and 10.9% had someone living alone who was 65 years of age or older. The average household size was 2.53 and the average family size was 2.86.

In the town, the population was spread out, with 20.3% under the age of 18, 9.6% from 18 to 24, 26.0% from 25 to 44, 26.0% from 45 to 64, and 18.2% who were 65 years of age or older. The median age was 40 years. For every 100 females, there were 122.8 males. For every 100 females age 18 and over, there were 131.8 males.

The median income for a household in the town was $38,182, and the median income for a family was $40,417. Males had a median income of $25,125 versus $17,969 for females. The per capita income for the town was $14,012. About 6.0% of families and 17.7% of the population were below the poverty line, including 16.7% of those under age 18 and 36.0% of those age 65 or over.

== Education ==
Most of Subiaco is in Scranton School District, while a section is in Paris School District. The former district's comprehensive high school is Scranton High School.

Subiaco Academy is in Subiaco.

== Gallery ==
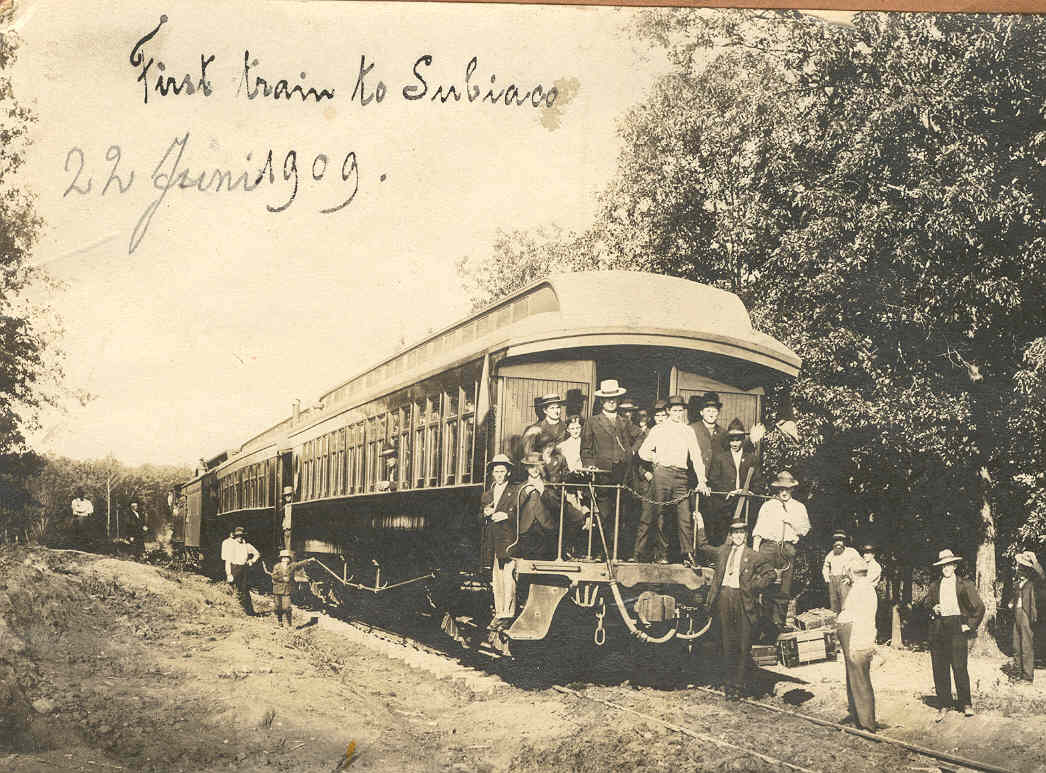
Arrival of the first train to Subiaco, June 22, 1909

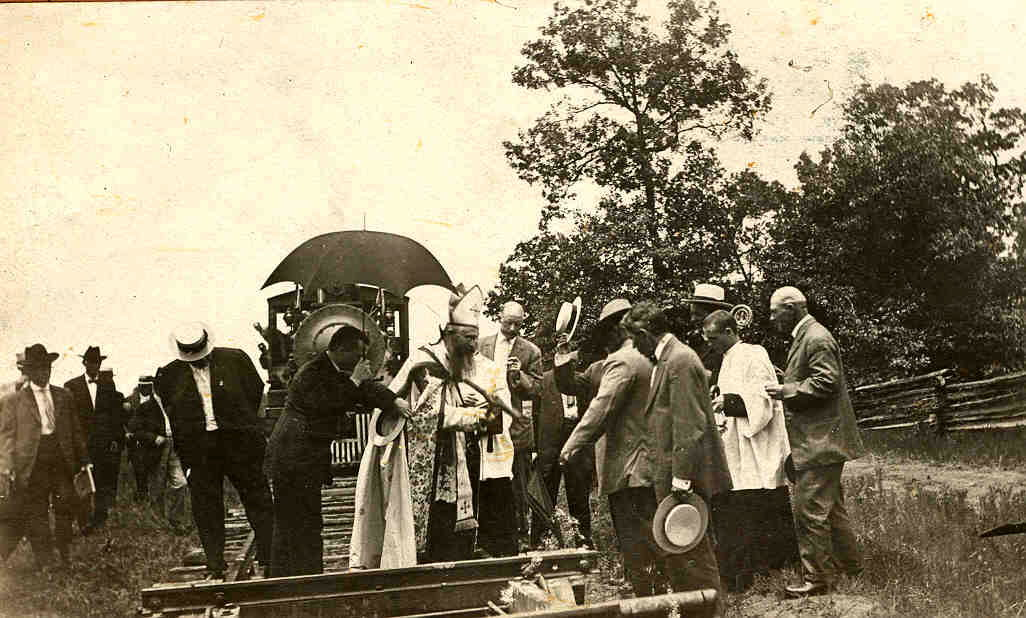
Official Inauguration and Driving of the Last Spike for the Railroad at Subiaco, June 30, 1909

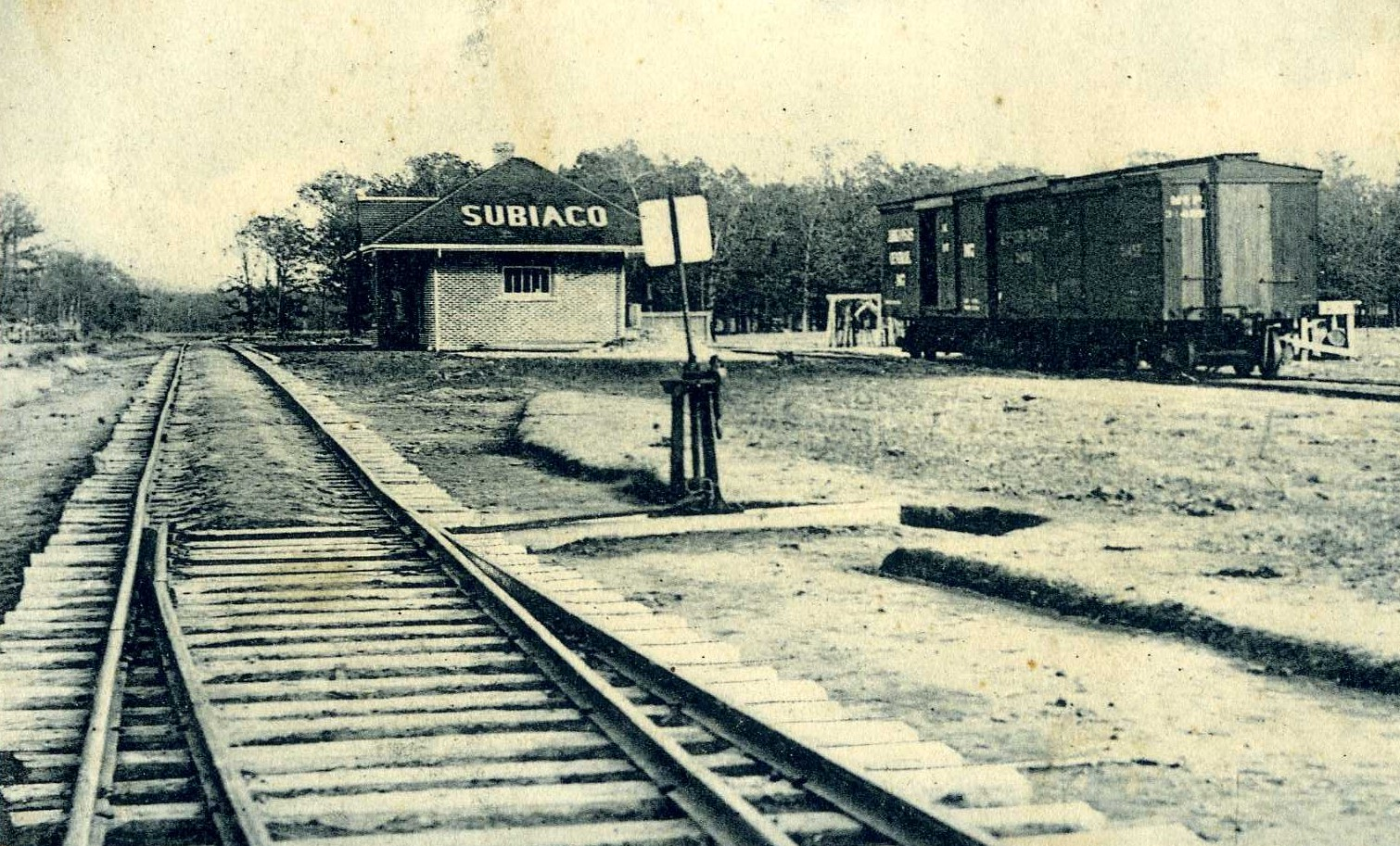
Early Subiaco Railroad Depot in Subiaco

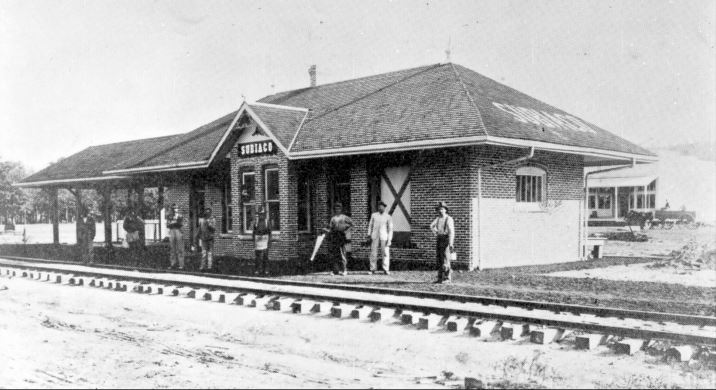
Early Subiaco Railroad Depot, with Store of Conrad Elsken in the background
