= Booneville, Arkansas =

- City
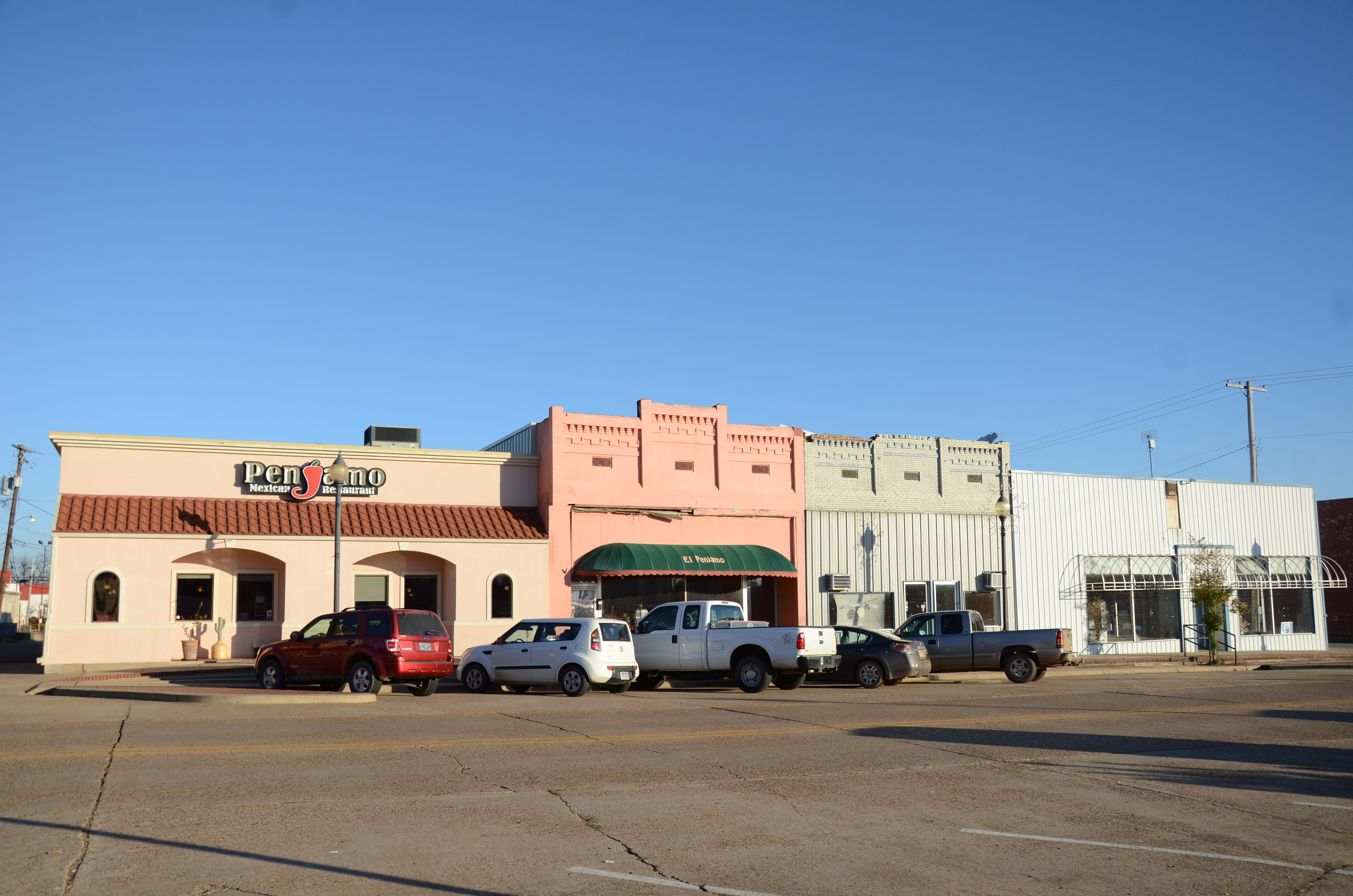
- Booneville commercial downtown district

- Location of Booneville in Logan County, Arkansas.
- Coordinates: 35°08′21″N 93°55′04″W
- Country: United States
- State: Arkansas
- County: Logan
- Established: 1828
- Incorporated: 1878, 1899

Area
  - Total: 3.96 sq mi (10.26 km^{2})
  - Land: 3.94 sq mi (10.21 km^{2})
  - Water: 0.019 sq mi (0.05 km^{2})
- Elevation: 482 ft (147 m)

Population (2020)
  - Total: 3,809
  - Estimate (2025): 3,836 ▲
  - Density: 965.9/sq mi (372.92/km^{2})
- Time zone: UTC−06:00 (Central (CST))
  - Summer (DST): UTC−05:00 (CDT)
- ZIP Code: 72927
- Area code: 479
- FIPS code: 05-07720
- GNIS feature ID: 2403896
- Website: www.cityofbooneville.com

Booneville is a city in Logan County, Arkansas, United States and the county seat of its southern district. Located in the Arkansas River Valley between the Ouachita and Ozark Mountains, the city is one of the oldest in western Arkansas. The city's economy was first based upon the railroad and Arkansas State Tuberculosis Sanatorium. It has developed a diverse economy of small businesses and light industry. Booneville's population was 3,809 at the 2020 census.

Booneville supports a community center, a senior-citizens center, a community hospital, a municipal airport, and new school facilities. Hunting, fishing, camping, hiking, and other outdoors activities are readily available in nearby national forests and state parks.

== History ==
=== Naming ===
The city was founded in 1828 when Walter Cauthron, an early explorer of the Arkansas Territory, built a log cabin and store along the Petit Jean River. By some accounts, he intended to name the community as "Bonneville" for friend Benjamin Bonneville, but the spelling and name were later changed. Another theory is that the name was to honor Daniel Boone, a friend of the Logan family for whom the county is named.

=== 2008 explosion of meat-packing plant ===
On March 23, 2008, a fire set off multiple explosions at the Cargill Meat Solutions plant in Booneville. According to local authorities the explosions caused an ammonia gas leak that forced 180 people from their homes. There were no reported injuries of the accident. The fire was reportedly started from an accident caused by welders doing repairs on fans in a freezer section. The Cargill Meat plant was the town's largest employer at the time of the explosions.

== Geography ==
According to the United States Census Bureau, the city has a total area of 4.1 square miles (11 km^{2}), all land.

Booneville is near Blue Mountain Lake, a lake popular for fishing, boating, and swimming. Five United States Army Corps of Engineers recreation areas are available for public lake access. At the east end of the lake, the Blue Mountain Wildlife Demonstration Area is a world-class bird-dog field area. This area also hosts visitors interested in hiking, birding, and mountain bike riding.

=== Climate ===
Climate data for Booneville, Arkansas (1991–2020 normals, extremes 1915–present)
Month	Jan	Feb	Mar	Apr	May	Jun	Jul	Aug	Sep	Oct	Nov	Dec	Year
Record high °F (°C)	84 (29)	87 (31)	94 (34)	96 (36)	99 (37)	111 (44)	114 (46)	118 (48)	112 (44)	100 (38)	89 (32)	83 (28)	118 (48)
Mean daily maximum °F (°C)	50.0 (10.0)	55.2 (12.9)	63.5 (17.5)	72.5 (22.5)	79.5 (26.4)	87.2 (30.7)	92.1 (33.4)	91.9 (33.3)	84.8 (29.3)	74.5 (23.6)	62.2 (16.8)	52.4 (11.3)	72.1 (22.3)
Daily mean °F (°C)	39.0 (3.9)	43.1 (6.2)	51.0 (10.6)	59.8 (15.4)	68.6 (20.3)	76.6 (24.8)	81.0 (27.2)	80.1 (26.7)	73.0 (22.8)	62.0 (16.7)	50.2 (10.1)	41.5 (5.3)	60.5 (15.8)
Mean daily minimum °F (°C)	28.0 (−2.2)	31.1 (−0.5)	38.5 (3.6)	47.2 (8.4)	57.7 (14.3)	65.9 (18.8)	69.9 (21.1)	68.4 (20.2)	61.3 (16.3)	49.5 (9.7)	38.1 (3.4)	30.7 (−0.7)	48.9 (9.4)
Record low °F (°C)	−18 (−28)	−6 (−21)	5 (−15)	22 (−6)	30 (−1)	45 (7)	49 (9)	41 (5)	32 (0)	18 (−8)	8 (−13)	−9 (−23)	−18 (−28)
Average precipitation inches (mm)	3.75 (95)	3.20 (81)	4.78 (121)	5.04 (128)	5.82 (148)	4.24 (108)	3.56 (90)	3.49 (89)	4.39 (112)	4.40 (112)	4.62 (117)	4.35 (110)	51.64 (1,312)
Average precipitation days (≥ 0.01 in)	7.6	7.6	9.5	8.7	10.4	8.0	8.1	7.0	7.2	7.9	8.0	7.9	97.9
Source: NOAA

== Demographics ==
=== 2020 census ===
Historical population
Census	Pop.	Note	%±
1880	275		—
1890	496		80.4%
1900	988		99.2%
1910	1,631		65.1%
1920	2,199		34.8%
1930	2,099		−4.5%
1940	2,324		10.7%
1950	2,433		4.7%
1960	2,690		10.6%
1970	3,239		20.4%
1980	3,718		14.8%
1990	3,804		2.3%
2000	4,117		8.2%
2010	3,990		−3.1%
2020	3,809		−4.5%
2025 (est.)	3,836	▲	0.7%
U.S. Decennial Census; 2014 Estimate

Booneville racial composition
Race	Number	Percentage
White (non-Hispanic)	3,346	87.84%
Black or African American (non-Hispanic)	22	0.58%
Native American	61	1.6%
Asian	24	0.63%
Pacific Islander	1	0.03%
Other/Mixed	218	5.72%
Hispanic or Latino	137	3.6%

As of the 2020 census, there were 3,809 people, 1,439 households, and 855 families residing in the city.

The median age was 36.8 years. 25.8% of residents were under the age of 18 and 18.1% were 65 years of age or older. For every 100 females, there were 88.9 males, and for every 100 females age 18 and over, there were 83.5 males age 18 and over.

0.0% of residents lived in urban areas, while 100.0% lived in rural areas.

Of all households, 30.9% had children under the age of 18 living in them. 38.4% were married-couple households, 18.2% were households with a male householder and no spouse or partner present, and 35.0% were households with a female householder and no spouse or partner present. About 31.9% of all households were made up of individuals, and 15.2% had someone living alone who was 65 years of age or older.

There were 1,785 housing units, of which 14.1% were vacant. The homeowner vacancy rate was 3.8% and the rental vacancy rate was 12.7%.

=== 2000 census ===
As of the census of 2000, 4,117 people, 1,619 households, and 1,109 families were residing in the city. The population density was 1,010.0 inhabitants per square mile (390.0/km^{2}). The 1,863 housing units averaged 457.0 per square mile (176.3/km^{2}). The racial makeup of the city was 96.62% White, 0.05% African American, 1.12% Native American, 0.27% Asian, 0.05% Pacific Islander, 0.17% from other races, and 1.72% from two or more races. About 0.87% of the population was Hispanic or Latino of any race.

Of the 1,619 households, 34.8% had children under the age of 18 living with them, 51.3% were married couples living together, 13.3% had a female householder with no husband present, and 31.5% were not families. About 28.5% of all households were made up of individuals, and 16.2% had someone living alone who was 65 years of age or older. The average household size was 2.48, and the average family size was 3.01.

In the city, the population was distributed as 28.0% under the age of 18, 8.1% from 18 to 24, 26.4% from 25 to 44, 20.0% from 45 to 64, and 17.5% who were 65 years of age or older. The median age was 36 years. For every 100 females, there were 88.9 males. For every 100 females age 18 and over, there were 82.1 males.

The median income for a household in the city was $26,627, and for a family was $31,012. Males had a median income of $25,238 versus $20,092 for females. The per capita income for the city was $13,076. About 13.1% of families and 18.4% of the population were below the poverty line, including 22.0% of those under age 18 and 23.9% of those age 65 or over.

== Education ==
First grade class standing in front of Booneville Elementary School, former Booneville Co-Educational Institute, 1954

From its early days, Booneville has supported education. In 1874, as a response to needs for higher learning in western Arkansas, the Fort Smith District of the Methodist Episcopal Church, South, authorized the establishment of the Fort Smith District High School in Booneville, 40 miles to the west. Local church members donated the land, building materials, and labor. The school, located on South College Street, was to be supported by student tuition fees. Students came from towns all over western Arkansas to board with Booneville families and attend a school that offered an advanced curriculum, including Latin, German, advanced mathematics, literature, and music. The school functioned until the early 1900s.

After the school closed, a group of residents and business leaders formed the Booneville Education Association and acquired 9 acres (36,000 m^{2}) of land in the northwest part of town. The new school was called the Booneville Co-Educational Institute and also offered a more advanced curriculum than the public school around. Graduates were admitted as sophomores at the University of Arkansas at Fayetteville.

In 1920, state funds were made available for the support of public high schools and the school's property was transferred to the Booneville School District. The building continued to be used as the city's high school until a new building was built in 1929. The old Co-Educational Institute building was used as the Booneville elementary school for several decades after that.

== Infrastructure ==
=== Transportation ===
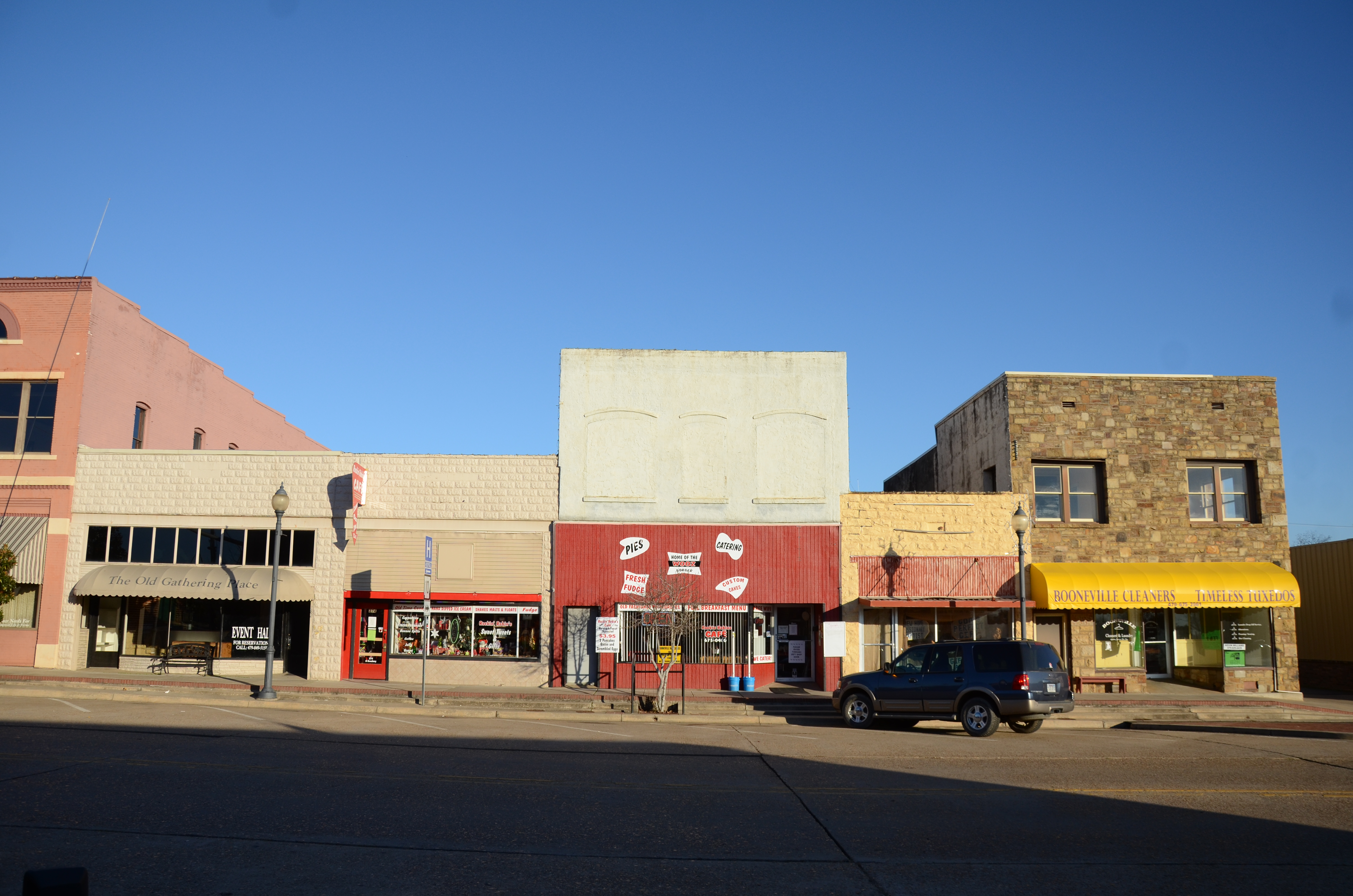
Highway 23 in downtown Booneville

The city is located at the intersection of Highway 23 (commonly known as the "Pig Trail") and Highway 10. Both routes are designated as Arkansas Scenic Byways near Booneville. Highway 217 also runs north and south from the city.

Rights-of-way for downtown city streets dedicated during the original town plan are wider than in most communities.

=== Water/wastewater ===
The city of Booneville owns the Booneville Water Department, which treats and distributes potable water from Lake Booneville to the residents and commercial users of the city in accordance with Arkansas Department of Health regulations.

The Booneville Water Department also collects and treats wastewater in accordance with a Clean Water Act National Pollutant Discharge Elimination System permit issued and administrated by the Arkansas Department of Environmental Quality. Treated effluent is discharged to Booneville Creek, ultimately draining to the Arkansas River.

== Notable people ==
- Dizzy and Daffy Dean, Major League Baseball (MLB) players and brothers, were born in the small community of Lucas, 14 miles (23 km) west of Booneville.
- Kimberly Foster, television and movie actor, is best known for her role as Michelle Stevens in the later seasons of the primetime soap opera Dallas.
- Elizabeth Ward Gracen was Miss America 1982 and an actress on Highlander: The Series.
- John P. McConnell was chief of staff of the United States Air Force from February 1, 1965, to July 31, 1969.
- Floyd Speer, pitcher for the Chicago White Sox, played MLB from April 25, 1943, to May 3, 1944. He is buried in the Carolan Community Cemetery.
- Aaron Lee Ward, former Baseball player and member of the New York Yankees first World Series championship team 1923
- Paul X. Williams, a federal judge for the Western District of Arkansas, was appointed by President Lyndon B. Johnson.
