= Logan County, Arkansas =

County in Arkansas, United States

- County
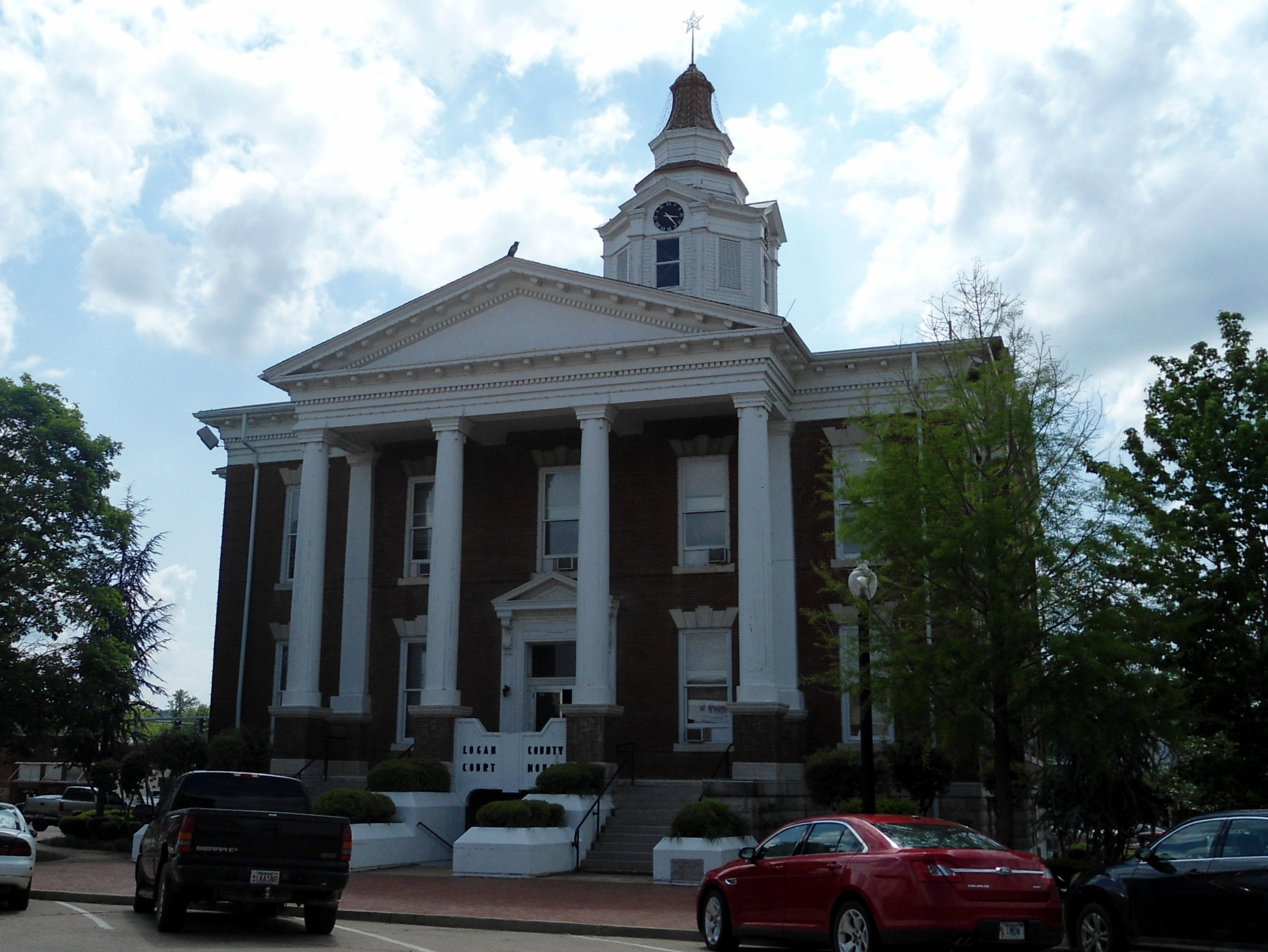
- Logan County Courthouse, Paris

- Location within the U.S. state of Arkansas
- Coordinates: 35°13′29″N 93°44′26″W
- Country: United States
- State: Arkansas
- Founded: March 22, 1871
- Named for: James Logan
- Seat: Paris (northern district); Booneville (southern district)
- Largest city: Booneville

Area
  - Total: 732 sq mi (1,900 km^{2})
  - Land: 708 sq mi (1,830 km^{2})
  - Water: 23 sq mi (60 km^{2}) 3.2%

Population (2020)
  - Total: 21,131
  - Estimate (2025): 21,633 ▲
  - Density: 29.8/sq mi (11.5/km^{2})
- Time zone: UTC−6 (Central)
  - Summer (DST): UTC−5 (CDT)
- Congressional district: 4th
- Website: logancountyark.org

Logan County (formerly Sarber County) is a county located in the U.S. state of Arkansas. As of the 2020 census, the population was 21,131. Its two county seats are Booneville and Paris.

== History ==
The Arkansas General Assembly defined the state's 64th county on March 22, 1871, incorporating parts of Scott, Yell, and Pope counties (later adding part of Franklin County). They named it Sarber County for John Newton Sarber (1837–1905), an attorney and Republican state senator from Yell County. He had introduced the resolution to organize the county. Born and reared in Pittsburgh, Pennsylvania, he had moved with his widowed father and family to Kansas in 1855. Sarber became influential in the Arkansas legislature, introducing bills to establish a public school system for the first time, and what developed as the University of Arkansas. In 1873, Sarber was appointed U.S. marshal of the U.S. Western District Court at Fort Smith.

Conservative white Democrats viewed Sarber as a carpetbagger because he was a Union Army veteran who had decided to settle in Arkansas. There he had married Susan Rebecca Rose in 1867. She was the daughter of Moreau Rose, an early pioneer and a Confederate supporter, and his wife. The Sarber couple had six children together; five survived to adulthood.

After white Democrats regained control of the state legislature in 1875, they renamed Sarber County for James Logan (1792–1859), a Kentucky-born early settler in the area who had served in the territorial legislature, from Crawford County, and the first state legislature, from Scott County (part of the latter was absorbed into Logan County).

== Geography ==
According to the U.S. Census Bureau, the county has a total area of 732 square miles (1,900 km^{2}), of which 708 square miles (1,830 km^{2}) are land and 23 square miles (60 km^{2}) (3.2%) are water. The highest natural point in Arkansas, Magazine Mountain at 2,753 feet (839 m), is located in Logan County.

=== Major highways ===
- U.S. Highway 71
- Highway 10
- Highway 22
- Highway 23
- Highway 41
- Highway 60
- Highway 109
- Highway 116
- Highway 197
- Highway 217
- Highway 288
- Highway 309
- Highway 369
- Highway 393
- Highway 398

=== Adjacent counties ===
- Johnson County (north)
- Pope County (northeast)
- Yell County (southeast)
- Scott County (south)
- Sebastian County (west)
- Franklin County (northwest)

== Demographics ==
Historical population
Census	Pop.	Note	%±
1880	14,885		—
1890	20,774		39.6%
1900	20,563		−1.0%
1910	26,350		28.1%
1920	25,866		−1.8%
1930	24,110		−6.8%
1940	25,967		7.7%
1950	20,260		−22.0%
1960	15,957		−21.2%
1970	16,789		5.2%
1980	20,144		20.0%
1990	20,557		2.1%
2000	22,486		9.4%
2010	22,353		−0.6%
2020	21,131		−5.5%
2025 (est.)	21,633	▲	2.4%
U.S. Decennial Census; 1790–1960 1900–1990; 1990–2000 2010

=== 2020 census ===
As of the 2020 census, the county had a population of 21,131. The median age was 43.8 years. 23.0% of residents were under the age of 18 and 20.8% of residents were 65 years of age or older. For every 100 females there were 97.3 males, and for every 100 females age 18 and over there were 95.3 males age 18 and over.

The racial makeup of the county was 89.1% White, 1.1% Black or African American, 1.1% American Indian and Alaska Native, 1.6% Asian, <0.1% Native Hawaiian and Pacific Islander, 1.1% from some other race, and 6.0% from two or more races. Hispanic or Latino residents of any race comprised 3.0% of the population.

<0.1% of residents lived in urban areas, while 100.0% lived in rural areas.

There were 8,449 households in the county, of which 29.1% had children under the age of 18 living in them. Of all households, 48.6% were married-couple households, 18.8% were households with a male householder and no spouse or partner present, and 25.8% were households with a female householder and no spouse or partner present. About 28.3% of all households were made up of individuals and 14.0% had someone living alone who was 65 years of age or older.

There were 9,744 housing units, of which 13.3% were vacant. Among occupied housing units, 74.3% were owner-occupied and 25.7% were renter-occupied. The homeowner vacancy rate was 1.8% and the rental vacancy rate was 10.9%.

=== 2000 census ===
As of the 2000 census, there were 22,486 people, 8,693 households, and 6,302 families residing in the county. The population density was 32 people per square mile (12 people/km^{2}). There were 9,942 housing units at an average density of 14 per square mile (5.4/km^{2}). The racial makeup of the county was 96.46% White, 1.05% Black or African American, 0.65% Native American, 0.15% Asian, 0.02% Pacific Islander, 0.39% from other races, and 1.28% from two or more races. 1.21% of the population were Hispanic or Latino of any race.

There were 8,693 households, out of which 32.90% had children under the age of 18 living with them, 58.70% were married couples living together, 10.10% had a female householder with no husband present, and 27.50% were non-families. 24.40% of all households were made up of individuals, and 12.50% had someone living alone who was 65 years of age or older. The average household size was 2.53 and the average family size was 3.00.

In the county, the population was spread out, with 25.90% under the age of 18, 7.50% from 18 to 24, 26.70% from 25 to 44, 23.90% from 45 to 64, and 16.00% who were 65 years of age or older. The median age was 38 years. For every 100 females there were 98.40 males. For every 100 females age 18 and over, there were 94.20 males.

The median income for a household in the county was $28,344, and the median income for a family was $33,732. Males had a median income of $24,472 versus $18,681 for females. The per capita income for the county was $14,527. About 11.40% of families and 15.40% of the population were below the poverty line, including 18.20% of those under age 18 and 19.60% of those age 65 or over.

== Government and politics ==
=== Government ===
The county government is a constitutional body granted specific powers by the Constitution of Arkansas and the Arkansas Code. The quorum court is the legislative branch of the county government and controls all spending and revenue collection. Representatives are called justices of the peace and are elected from county districts every even-numbered year. The number of districts in a county vary from nine to fifteen, and district boundaries are drawn by the county election commission. The Logan County Quorum Court has eleven members. Presiding over quorum court meetings is the county judge, who serves as the chief operating officer of the county. The county judge is elected at-large and does not vote in quorum court business, although capable of vetoing quorum court decisions.

Logan County, Arkansas Elected countywide officials
Position	Officeholder	Party
County Judge	Ray Gack	Republican
County Clerk	Brent Anderton	(Unknown)
Circuit Clerk	April Hice	Republican
Sheriff	Jason Massey	Republican
Treasurer	Lori L. Krepps	Republican
Collector	Brittany Porter	Republican
Assessor	Shannon Cotton	Republican
Coroner	Blake Schluterman	Republican

The composition of the Quorum Court following the 2024 elections is 10 Republicans and 1 Democrat. Justices of the Peace (members) of the Quorum Court following the elections are:

- District 1: Charlie Sparks (R)
- District 2: Gary Rhinehart (R)
- District 3: Michael B. Schluterman (R)
- District 4: Joyce Koch (D)
- District 5: Bill Wright (R)
- District 6: Jeffrey O'Neal (R)
- District 7: Bobby Cobb (R)
- District 8: Dalton Haller (R)
- District 9: Sam Tabler (R)
- District 10: Dr. Christopher Loftin (R)
- District 11: Brenda Haley Brewer (R)

Additionally, the townships of Logan County are entitled to elect their own respective constables, as set forth by the Constitution of Arkansas. Constables are largely of historical significance as they were used to keep the peace in rural areas when travel was more difficult. The township constables as of the 2024 elections are:

- Ellsworth: Michael Huber (R)
- Short Mountain: John Paul Wells (R)
- Tomlinson: Hillard Turner (D)

=== Politics ===
Over the past few election cycles, Logan County has trended heavily towards the GOP. The last Democrat (as of 2024) to carry this county was Bill Clinton in 1996.

United States presidential election results for Logan County, Arkansas
Year	Republican		Democratic		Third party(ies)	
Year	No.	%	No.	%	No.	%
1896	946	34.51%	1,786	65.16%	9	0.33%
1900	848	34.88%	1,557	64.05%	26	1.07%
1904	1,007	43.92%	1,237	53.95%	49	2.14%
1908	1,151	38.65%	1,716	57.62%	111	3.73%
1912	333	12.98%	1,319	51.40%	914	35.62%
1916	1,183	36.96%	2,018	63.04%	0	0.00%
1920	1,871	49.51%	1,840	48.69%	68	1.80%
1924	937	32.06%	1,457	49.85%	529	18.10%
1928	1,455	42.42%	1,967	57.35%	8	0.23%
1932	645	20.32%	2,493	78.54%	36	1.13%
1936	770	22.38%	2,663	77.41%	7	0.20%
1940	1,065	27.34%	2,831	72.66%	0	0.00%
1944	1,279	35.98%	2,269	63.83%	7	0.20%
1948	902	28.26%	2,130	66.73%	160	5.01%
1952	2,103	44.85%	2,567	54.75%	19	0.41%
1956	2,081	47.17%	2,307	52.29%	24	0.54%
1960	2,014	42.28%	2,636	55.33%	114	2.39%
1964	2,265	38.42%	3,604	61.13%	27	0.46%
1968	2,341	36.02%	1,998	30.74%	2,160	33.24%
1972	4,964	71.42%	1,956	28.14%	30	0.43%
1976	2,909	35.07%	5,313	64.06%	72	0.87%
1980	4,511	50.61%	4,098	45.98%	304	3.41%
1984	5,663	63.14%	3,206	35.75%	100	1.11%
1988	2,203	62.87%	1,254	35.79%	47	1.34%
1992	3,408	39.23%	3,995	45.99%	1,284	14.78%
1996	2,966	37.07%	3,832	47.89%	1,204	15.05%
2000	4,487	55.42%	3,283	40.55%	326	4.03%
2004	5,076	59.36%	3,361	39.31%	114	1.33%
2008	5,350	67.66%	2,286	28.91%	271	3.43%
2012	5,079	69.28%	2,009	27.40%	243	3.31%
2016	5,746	72.54%	1,715	21.65%	460	5.81%
2020	6,441	78.31%	1,544	18.77%	240	2.92%
2024	6,567	80.04%	1,464	17.84%	174	2.12%

== Communities ==
=== Cities ===
- Booneville (county seat)
- Magazine
- Paris (county seat)
- Ratcliff
- Scranton

=== Towns ===
- Blue Mountain
- Caulksville
- Morrison Bluff
- Subiaco

=== Census-designated place ===
- New Blaine

=== Unincorporated communities ===
- Carolan
- Prairie View

=== Townships ===
Townships in Arkansas are the divisions of a county. Each township includes unincorporated areas; some may have incorporated cities or towns within part of their boundaries. Arkansas townships have limited purposes in modern times. However, the United States census does list Arkansas population based on townships (sometimes referred to as "county subdivisions" or "minor civil divisions"). Townships are also of value for historical purposes in terms of genealogical research. Each town or city is within one or more townships in an Arkansas county based on census maps and publications. The townships of Logan County are listed below; listed in parentheses are the cities, towns, and/or census-designated places that are fully or partially inside the township.

- Barber
- Blue Mountain (Blue Mountain)
- Boone (Booneville)
- Cane Creek
- Cauthron
- Clark (Subiaco)
- Delaware
- Driggs
- Ellsworth
- Johnson
- Logan
- Mountain
- Petit Jean
- Reveilee (Magazine)
- River (Morrison Bluff, Scranton)
- Roseville
- Shoal Creek (CDP New Blaine)
- Short Mountain (Paris)
- Six Mile (Caulksville, Ratcliff)
- Sugar Creek
- Tomlinson
- Washburn

== Notable residents ==
- Katharine Anthony, American biographer
- James Bridges, born in Paris, Arkansas, screenwriter and film director
- Dizzy Dean, born in Lucas, Arkansas, major league baseball player
- Paul Dean, born in Lucas, Arkansas, brother of Dizzy Dean and major league baseball player
- Jon Eubanks, Republican member of the Arkansas House of Representatives from Paris, Arkansas; a farmer and Certified Public Accountant
- General John P. McConnell, Chief of Staff, USAF
- Robert Johnson, lived in Lucas, Arkansas, at the time of the 1920 census. Renowned Bluesman.

== See also ==
- List of lakes in Logan County, Arkansas
- National Register of Historic Places listings in Logan County, Arkansas
