= Arkansas Highway 147 =

State highway in Arkansas, United States

Highway 147
- AR 147 highlighted in red

Route information
- Maintained by ArDOT
- Length: 25.83 mi (41.57 km)

Major junctions
- South end: AR 131 at Bruins
- I-40 / US 79 / US 70 at Lehi
- North end: US 64 near Cunningham Corner

Location
- Country: United States
- State: Arkansas
- Counties: Crittenden

Highway system
- Arkansas Highway System; Interstate; US; State; Business; Spurs; Suffixed; Scenic; Heritage
← AR 146	→ AR 148

Arkansas Highway 147 (AR 147) is a north–south state highway in Crittenden County, Arkansas, United States. The route runs 25.83 miles (41.57 km) from Bruins north to U.S. Route 64 (US 64) north of Cunningham Corner. A portion of the route makes up the western routing of the Great River Road.

== Route description ==
Highway 147 begins as a continuation of Highway 131 at Bruins. The route runs north to serve as the eastern terminus of Highway 38, with Highway 147 picking up the Great River Road designation northbound. Highway 147 has another junction with Highway 131 before curving due north along the Mississippi River. The highway serves as the eastern terminus for Highway 50 south of Anthonyville, Arkansas before meeting another segment of Highway 131 in Edmondson. Highway 147 has a junctions with US 70 and I-40/US 79, with the former being the southern frontage road for the latter. The road continues north to terminate at US 64 north of Cunningham Corner.

== Major intersections ==
Mile markers reset at concurrencies. The entire route is in Crittenden County.

Location	mi	km	Destinations	Notes
Bruins	0.00	0.00	AR 131 north	Continuation north
	2.80	4.51	AR 38 west – Hughes	Eastern terminus of AR 38
Thompson Grove	5.80	9.33	AR 131 south – Horseshoe Lake, Seyppel	Northern terminus of AR 131
	11.03	17.75	AR 50 west	Eastern terminus of AR 50
Edmondson	19.17	30.85	AR 131 south (Mudline Road)	Northern terminus of AR 131
Lehi	21.18– 21.25	34.09– 34.20	I-40 (US 79) / US 70 – Little Rock, Memphis	Exit 271 on I-40
Cunningham Corner	24.31	39.12	AR 218 west	Eastern terminus of AR 218
	25.83	41.57	US 64 – Wynne, Marion	Northern terminus
1.000 mi = 1.609 km; 1.000 km = 0.621 mi
