= Arkansas Highway 131 =

State highway in Arkansas, United States

Highway 131

Route information
- Maintained by ArDOT

Section 1
- Length: 5.51 mi (8.87 km)
- South end: AR 1 in Haynes
- North end: CR 719

Section 2
- Length: 9.57 mi (15.40 km)
- North end: US 79 near Brickeys
- South end: CR 533 / CR 623

Section 3
- Length: 8.74 mi (14.07 km)
- South end: AR 147 at Bruins
- North end: AR 147 at Thompson Grove

Section 4
- Length: 3.11 mi (5.01 km)
- South end: Proctor Road in Edmondson
- North end: AR 147 in Edmondson

Section 5
- Length: 1.29 mi (2.08 km)
- South end: I-55 / US 61 / US 64 / US 79 in West Memphis
- North end: Martin Luther King Jr. Drive/Mound City Road, Mound City

Location
- Country: United States
- State: Arkansas
- Counties: Lee, Crittenden

Highway system
- Arkansas Highway System; Interstate; US; State; Business; Spurs; Suffixed; Scenic; Heritage
← AR 130	→ AR 132

Highway 131 (AR 131, Ark. 131, and Hwy. 131) is a designation for five north–south state highways in northeast Arkansas. One route of 5.51 miles (8.87 km) runs from Highway 1 in Haynes east to Lee County Road 719. A second route of 9.57 miles (15.40 km) begins at US Route 79 (US 79) near Brickeys and runs south (Note: Although Arkansas highways normally run from south to north and from west to east, the Lee County Route and Sections Map indicates that Highway 131 begins at US 79 and runs south.) to the Mississippi River levee. A third route of 8.74 miles (14.07 km) forms a semicircle around Horseshoe Lake and Porter Lake, connecting to Highway 147 at both ends. A fourth route of 3.11 miles (5.01 km) begins at Highway 147 and runs through Edmondson. A fifth route begins at Interstate 55/US 61/US 64/US 79 (I-55/US 61/US 64/US 79) in West Memphis and runs north to Martin Luther King Jr. Drive/Mound City Road in West Memphis. All routes are maintained by the Arkansas State Highway and Transportation Department (AHTD).

== Route description ==
=== Haynes to Lee County Wildlife Management Area ===
Highway 131 begins in Haynes at Highway 1/Crowley's Ridge Parkway and runs east to Lee County Wildlife Management Area. The highway continues slightly further east to terminate at Lee County Road 719 at the St. Francis County line. A segment of this route was discovered to be part of the state highway system in 2011.

=== Brickeys to Mississippi River ===
The second segment of Highway 131 begins at US 79 near the unincorporated community of Brickeys. Highway 131 winds south around Raggio and Park Place before terminating at the Mississippi River levee.

=== Bruins to Thompson Grove ===
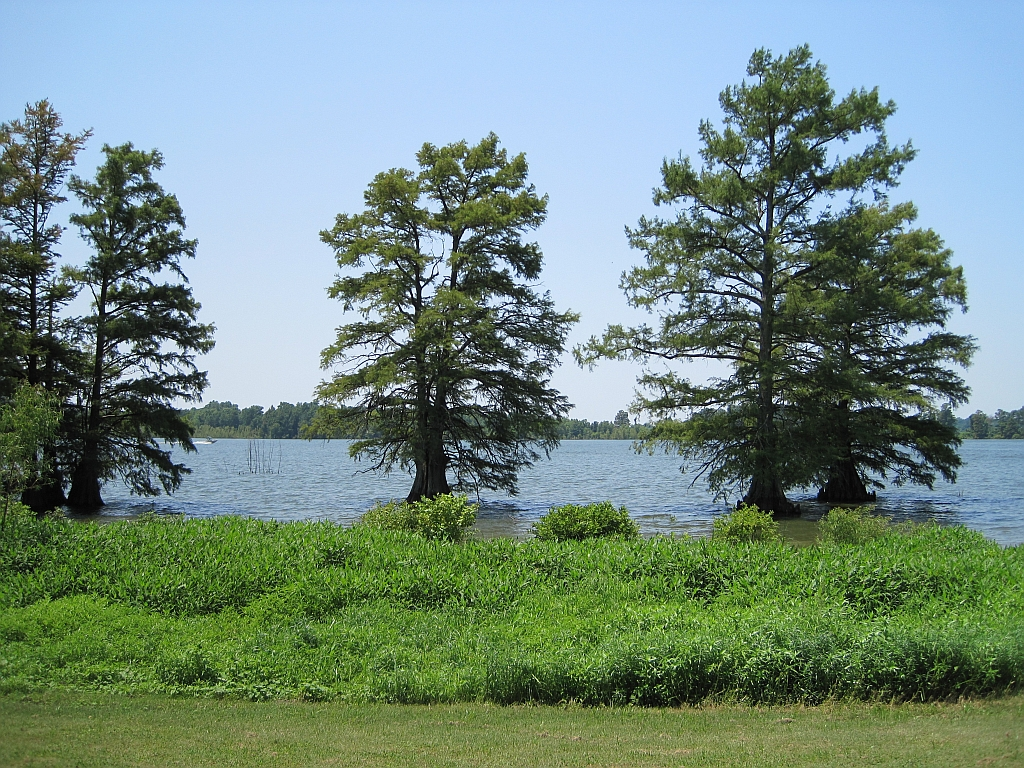
Horseshoe Lake is a former meander of the Mississippi River that was cut off forming an oxbow lake.

Highway 131 begins as a continuation of Highway 147 at Bruins near Porter Lake and runs clockwise through the town of Horseshoe Lake. The road continues around the Horseshoe Lake to terminate at Highway 147 at Thompson Grove.

=== Edmondson route ===
A fourth segment of Highway 131 begins at Proctor Road at the southern city limits of Edmondson. The highway runs north through downtown Edmondson before turning east and terminating at Highway 147.

=== West Memphis route ===
Highway 131 begins at Interstate 55/US 61/US 64/US 79 in West Memphis at exit 3A. The route runs north at a junction with incomplete access to I-40 exit 281. Highway 131 continues north to a fork in the road, continuing north at Mound City Road and south as Martin Luther King Jr. Drive.

== Major intersections ==
County	Location	mi	km	Destinations	Notes
Lee	Haynes	0.00	0.00	AR 1 (Crowley's Ridge Parkway) – Marianna	Southern terminus
Lee		5.51	8.87	CR 719	Northern terminus
Lee	Gap in route				
Lee	Brickeys	0.00	0.00	US 79 – Hughes, Marianna	Northern terminus
Lee		9.57	15.40	CR 533 / CR 623	Southern terminus
Gap in route
Crittenden	Bruins	0.00	0.00	AR 147 north	Continuation north
Crittenden	Thompson Grove	8.74	14.07	AR 147 – Hughes	Northern terminus
Crittenden	Gap in route				
Crittenden	Edmondson	0.00	0.00	Proctor Road	Southern terminus
Crittenden	Edmondson	3.11	5.01	AR 147	Northern terminus
Crittenden	Gap in route				
Crittenden	West Memphis	0.00	0.00	I-55 / US 61 / US 64 / US 79	I-55 exit 3A northbound; southern terminus.
Crittenden	West Memphis	0.67	1.08	I-40 east – Memphis	I-40 exit 281; eastbound entrance, westbound exit.
Crittenden	West Memphis	1.29	2.08	Martin Luther King Jr. Drive/Mound City Road	Northern terminus
1.000 mi = 1.609 km; 1.000 km = 0.621 mi: Incomplete access

== See also ==
- List of state highways in Arkansas
