= Arkansas Highway 50 =

State highway in Arkansas, United States

Highway 50

Route information
- Maintained by ArDOT
- Existed: 1926–present

Section 1
- Length: 27.96 mi (45.00 km)
- West end: CR 415 near Madison
- Major intersections: US 70 in Madison; US 79 in Chatfield
- East end: AR 147 near Anthonyville

Section 2
- Length: 15.84 mi (25.49 km)
- West end: US 70
- Major intersections: US 64 in Crawfordsville; I-55 in Clarkedale
- East end: AR 77 in Clarkedale

Location
- Country: United States
- State: Arkansas
- Counties: St. Francis, Crittenden

Highway system
- Arkansas Highway System; Interstate; US; State; Business; Spurs; Suffixed; Scenic; Heritage
← US 49	→ AR 51

Highway 50 (AR 50, Ark. 50, or Hwy. 50) is a designation for two east–west state highways in northeast Arkansas. A western route of 27.96 miles (45.00 km) runs east from St. Francis County Route 415 (CR 415) to Highway 147 near Anthonyville. A second route of 15.84 miles (25.49 km) begins at US Route 70 (US 70) and runs east to Highway 77 in Clarkedale.

== Route description ==
=== Forrest City to Anthonyville ===
Highway 50 begins at CR 415 north of Forrest City and runs south across Interstate 40 (I-40), although there is no interchange. The route continues south to Madison where it intersects US 70. The highway then crosses over the St. Francis River to enter Widener, where a concurrency begins with Highway 38. The two routes run together east to serve as the southern terminus of Highway 75 before Highway 38 splits south to Hughes. Continuing east, a short concurrency begins with Highway 149, ending near Greasy Corner. Highway 50 runs east to serve as the southern terminus of Highway 357 before a junction with US 79 on the Crittenden County line. Shortly after entering Crittenden County, Highway 50 terminates at Highway 147 south of Anthonyville.

=== US 70 to Clarkedale ===
Highway 50 begins northwest of Edmondson at US 70, which acts as a frontage road for I-40/US 63/US 79. The route runs north across Highway 218 to Crawfordsville. In Crawfordsville, Highway 50 briefly overlaps US 64B before crossing US 64 just north of town. The highway continues north before later turning east to a junction with I-55/US 61/US 63 in Clarkedale. The route terminates just east of this interchange at Highway 77 in Clarkedale.

== Major intersections ==
County	Location	mi	km	Destinations	Notes
St. Francis		0.00	0.00	CR 415	
St. Francis	Madison	2.27	3.65	US 70	
St. Francis	Madison	2.82– 2.96	4.54– 4.76	Bridge over St. Francis River	
St. Francis	Widener	5.19	8.35	AR 38 west	West end of AR 38 overlap
St. Francis		8.87	14.27	AR 75 north	
St. Francis		9.46	15.22	AR 38 east – Hughes	East end of AR 38 overlap
St. Francis		17.67	28.44	AR 149 north	West end of AR 149 overlap
St. Francis	Greasy Corner	21.23	34.17	AR 149 south – Hughes	East end of AR 149 overlap
St. Francis		21.66	34.86	AR 357 north	
St. Francis	Chatfield	23.69	38.13	US 79 to US 70 – Hughes	
Crittenden	96 Corner	27.96	45.00	AR 147 to I-40 – Horseshoe Lake	
Crittenden	Gap in route				
Crittenden		0.00	0.00	US 70 – West Memphis, Forrest City	
Crittenden		2.47	3.98	AR 218 to AR 147 – Shearerville	
Crittenden				Bucklake Road	Former AR 306 east
Crittenden	Crawfordsville	5.51	8.87	US 64B east (Old Highway 64)	South end of US 64B overlap
Crittenden		0.00	0.00	US 64 – Earle, Marion	North end of US 64B overlap
Crittenden	Clarkedale	9.41	15.14	I-55 (US 61 / US 63) – Blytheville, Memphis	I-55 exit 16
Crittenden	Clarkedale	10.33	16.62	AR 77 / Great River Road	
1.000 mi = 1.609 km; 1.000 km = 0.621 mi: Concurrency terminus

== See also ==
- List of state highways in Arkansas
