= Arkansas Highway 308 (1973–1979) =

Former state highway in Arkansas

Highway 308

Route information
- Maintained by ArDOT
- Length: 1.00 mi (1.61 km)
- Existed: March 28, 1973–January 10, 1979

Major junctions
- West end: End state maintenance
- East end: AR 75

Location
- Country: United States
- State: Arkansas
- Counties: Poinsett

Highway system
- Arkansas Highway System; Interstate; US; State; Business; Spurs; Suffixed; Scenic; Heritage
← AR 307	→ AR 309

Highway 308 (AR 308, Ark. 308, and Hwy. 308) is a former state highway in Poinsett County, Arkansas. Between 1973 and 1979, the highway was maintained by the Arkansas State Highway and Transportation Department (AHTD), now known as the Arkansas Department of Transportation (ArDOT).

== Route description ==
Highway 308 began at Highway 75 in Poinsett County, southeast of Marked Tree and north of the Northern Ohio community in the Arkansas Delta near the St. Francis River and the St. Francis Sunken Lands. It ran due west as a section line road in an agricultural area. State maintenance ended after one mile (1.6 km), with the roadway continuing west as Holt Road.

== History ==
In 1973, the Arkansas General Assembly passed Act 9 of 1973. The act directed county judges and legislators to designate up to 12 miles (19 km) of county roads as state highways in each county. The Arkansas State Highway Commission made one such designation on March 28, 1973, along 1 mile (1.6 km) of an existing county road southwest of Marked Tree. The Poinsett County judge later requested returning the highway to county maintenance, along with Highway 322, in exchange for an extension of Highway 158 to Greenfield. The Highway Commission granted the request on January 10, 1979, returning Highway 308 to county maintenance.

== Major intersections ==
The entire route was in Poinsett County.

Location	mi	km	Destinations	Notes
	0.0	0.0	AR 75	Eastern terminus
	1.00	1.61	End state maintenance, roadway continues as Holt Road	Western terminus
1.000 mi = 1.609 km; 1.000 km = 0.621 mi
