= Arkansas Highway 218 =

State highway in Arkansas, United States

Highway 218
- AR 218 highlighted in red

Route information
- Maintained by ArDOT
- Length: 7.35 mi (11.83 km)

Major junctions
- West end: US 70 / US 79 in Jennette
- I-40 / US 79 in Jennette; AR 50 near Cunningham Corner
- East end: AR 147 at Cunningham Corner

Location
- Country: United States
- State: Arkansas
- Counties: Crittenden

Highway system
- Arkansas Highway System; Interstate; US; State; Business; Spurs; Suffixed; Scenic; Heritage
← AR 217	→ AR 219

Arkansas Highway 218 (AR 218) is an east–west state highway in Crittenden County, Arkansas. The route runs 7.35 miles (11.83 km) from US 70 (US 70) in Jennette east to Highway 147 at Cunningham Corner.

== Route description ==
Highway 218 begins in Jennette at US 70 and continues south as US 79. The route runs north over I-40 as exit 265 and continues northeast. Highway 218 has a junction with Highway 50 before passing through Julius and terminating at Highway 147 at Cunningham Corner.

== Major intersections ==
The entire route is in Crittenden County.

Location	mi	km	Destinations	Notes
Jennette	0.00	0.00	US 70 / US 79 south – West Memphis, Forrest City, Hughes	Western terminus; western end of US 79 concurrency
Jennette	0.18	0.29	I-40 / US 79 north – Memphis, Little Rock	Eastern end of US 79 concurrency; exit 265 on I-40
	5.22	8.40	AR 50 – Crawfordsville	
Cunningham Corner	7.35	11.83	AR 147	Eastern terminus
1.000 mi = 1.609 km; 1.000 km = 0.621 mi
