= Arkansas Highway 357 =

State highway in Arkansas, United States

Highway 357

Route information
- Maintained by ArDOT
- Length: 9.20 mi (14.81 km)
- Existed: July 10, 1957–present

Major junctions
- South end: AR 50 in Greasy Corner
- North end: US 70 near Shearerville

Location
- Country: United States
- State: Arkansas
- Counties: St. Francis

Highway system
- Arkansas Highway System; Interstate; US; State; Business; Spurs; Suffixed; Scenic; Heritage
← AR 356	→ AR 358

Highway 357 (AR 357, Ark. 357, and Hwy. 357) is a north–south state highway in St. Francis County, Arkansas. The route of 9.20 miles (14.81 km) runs from Highway 50 north to U.S. Route 70 (US 70). The route is maintained by the Arkansas State Highway and Transportation Department (AHTD).

== Route description ==
Highway 357 begins at Highway 50 near Greasy Corner and runs north through many unincorporated communities. The route passes through Davis, Stump City, Jonquil and Willow Bend. Further north the route intersects US 70 and terminates. US 70 is essentially a frontage road to Interstate 40 in this area.

== History ==
The route was designated by the Arkansas State Highway Commission on July 10, 1957, during a period of expansion in the state highway system. The Arkansas General Assembly passed the Act 148 of 1957, the Milum Road Act, creating 10–12 miles (16–19 km) of new state highways in each county.

== Major intersections ==
The entire route is in St. Francis County.

Location	mi	km	Destinations	Notes
Greasy Corner	0.00	0.00	AR 50 – Madison	
	9.20	14.81	US 70 – Forrest City, West Memphis	
1.000 mi = 1.609 km; 1.000 km = 0.621 mi
