= Arkansas Highway 38 =

Highway in Arkansas

Highway 38

Route information
- Maintained by ArDOT
- Existed: 1926–present

Section 1
- Length: 50.2 mi (80.8 km)
- West end: I-57 / US 67 / US 167 in Cabot
- East end: US 49 near Hunter

Section 2
- Length: 21.47 mi (34.55 km)
- West end: I-40 / CR 419 near Widener
- Major intersections: US 70 near Widener; US 79 in Hughes
- East end: AR 147 near Horseshoe Lake

Section 3
- Length: 0.8 mi (1,300 m)
- South end: US 70 in West Memphis
- Major intersections: I-55 / US 61 / US 64 / US 78 / US 79 in West Memphis
- North end: I-40 in West Memphis

Location
- Country: United States
- State: Arkansas
- Counties: Lonoke, Prairie, Woodruff, St. Francis, Crittenden

Highway system
- Arkansas Highway System; Interstate; US; State; Business; Spurs; Suffixed; Scenic; Heritage
← AR 37	→ AR 39

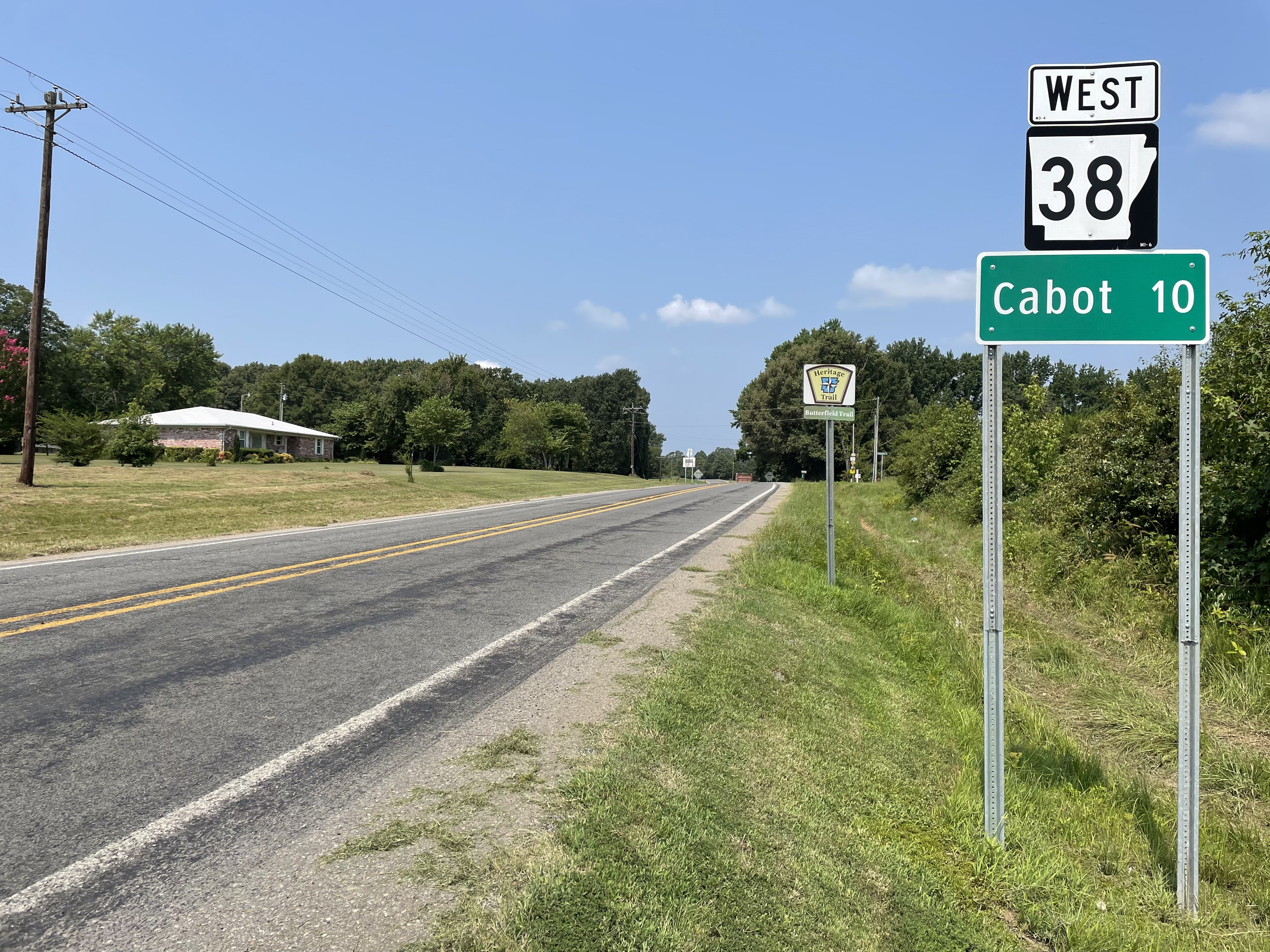
Highway 38 at the intersection of Highway 31 south of Beebe

Arkansas Highway 38 (AR 38) is a designation for three state highways in Arkansas. One segment of 50.2 miles (80.8 km) runs from Interstate 57 (I-57) in Cabot east to U.S. Route 49 (US 49) south of Hunter. A second segment of 21.47 miles (34.55 km) runs from I-40 north of Widener east to Highway 147 west of Horseshoe Lake. A third segment of 0.8 miles (1.3 km) runs in West Memphis from US 70 north to I-40. All routes are maintained by the Arkansas State Highway and Transportation Department (AHTD).

== Route description ==
=== Cabot to Hunter ===
Highway 38 begins at I-57/US 67/US 167 in Cabot before intersecting Highway 367. The highway connects agricultural areas in Arkansas's Grand Prairie, including rice and soybeans as well as aquaculture. Passing east through Austin, where it has an intersection with Highway 319. The intersection is near the Sears House, an 1860 antebellum home in late Greek Revival-Italianate style listed on the National Register of Historic Places (NRHP). Continuing east, Highway 38 runs through unincorporated area in eastern Lonoke County, intersecting Highway 321 near Sylvania and Highway 31 near Butlerville before entering Prairie County.

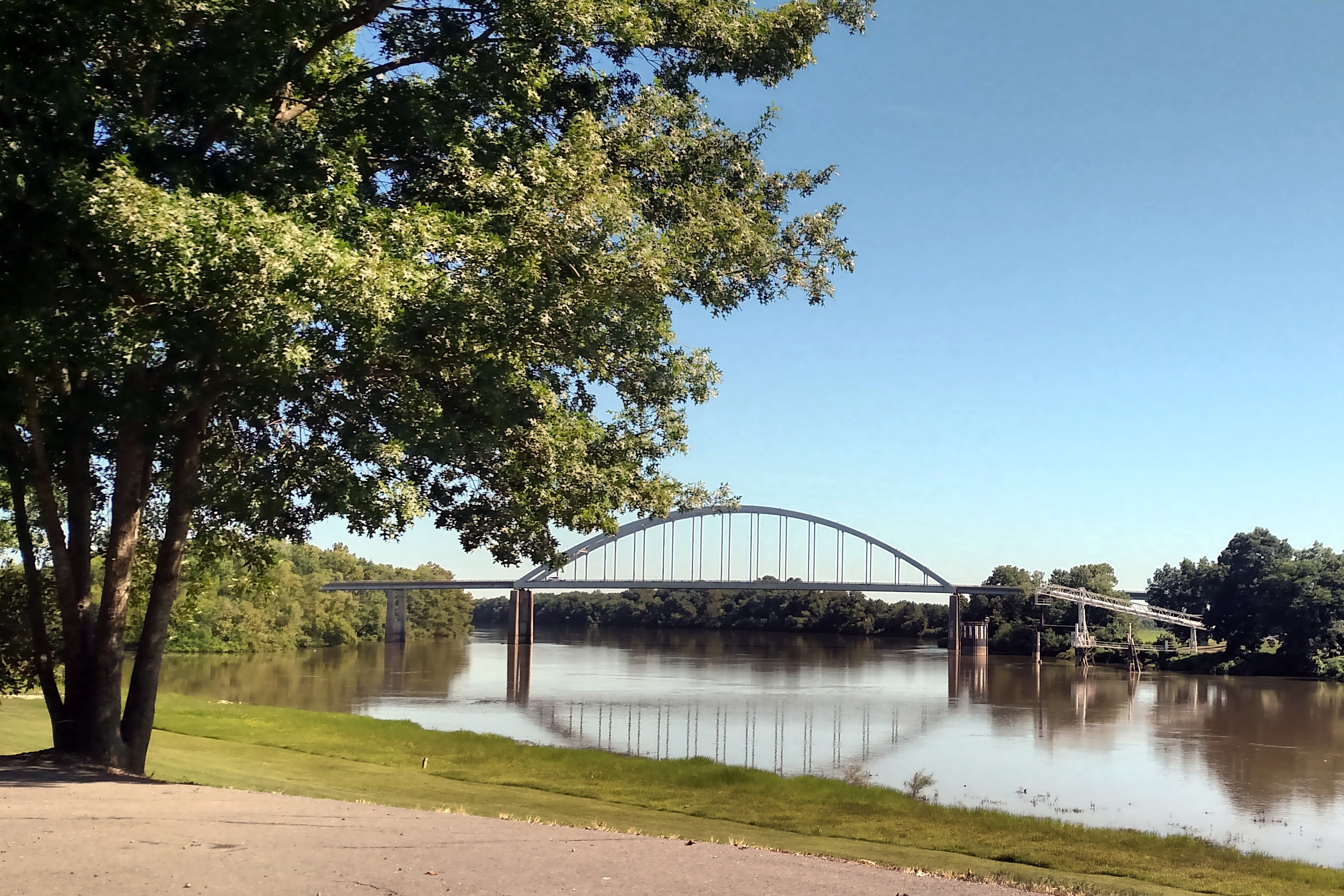
White River at Des Arc, with Highway 38 passing over on the bridge in the background

Upon entering Prairie County, Highway 38 continues to pass through rural, agricultural areas with small settlements at intersections with other state highways. The highway intersects Highway 13 at Hickory Plains, Highway 86 at Hayley, and Highway 11 at Fourmile Corner. Highway 11 begins a concurrency with Highway 38 eastward toward Des Arc, the county seat for the northern district of Prairie County. (Note: Although Arkansas highways normally terminate when intersected by a route of greater importance, Highway 38 in Prairie County does not end when intersecting Highway 11 near Des Arc.) Entering Des Arc, Highway 38 and Highway 11 intersect Highway 323 near the Lower White River Museum State Park. Highway 323 runs to the downtown business district, with Highway 38 turning northeast and bypassing most of the city. In northern Des Arc, the concurrency with Highway 11 ends, with Highway 11 turning due north toward the Bayou De View Wildlife Management Area and Searcy. This intersection also contains Highway 323Y, which is a short spur route providing access to downtown Des Arc. Highway 38 continues along the northern edge of Des Arc, passing the historic Oak Grove Cemetery, listed on the NRHP, and crossing over the White River on a 1970 steel through truss bridge. Highway 33 overlaps Highway 38 in eastern Prairie County until the Woodruff County line, when Highway 33 turns north toward Augusta, ending the concurrency. (Note: Although Arkansas highways normally terminate when intersected by a route of greater importance, Highway 38 in Prairie County does not end when intersecting Highway 33 in eastern Prairie County.)

Running east as a section line road, Highway 38 enters Woodruff County at Little Dixie and runs east to Cotton Plant. Serving as Main Street in Cotton Plant, the highway passes intersects Highway 306 before beginning a short overlap with Highway 17 through historic downtown Cotton Plant. East of the city, Highway 38 briefly dips into Monroe County and crosses Bayou DeView before terminating US 49 south of Hunter.

== History ==
The route from Des Arc to Cotton Plant was originally designated as part of Arkansas State Road B-7 in the original 1924 state highway plan. This route ran north from the Stuttgart area to Cotton Plant via Des Arc, roughly along present-day US 63, Highway 11 and Highway 38. During the 1926 Arkansas state highway numbering, the Highway 38 designation was assigned to the short connector highway between Des Arc and Cotton Plant. The route was extended west to Cabot in the late 1930s. A minor routing change west of Hughes involving a new bridge over Blackfish Bayou occurred in 1956.

Highway 38 was extended east in 1958 following the construction of a new US 79 alignment in Hughes. Highway 38 was extended east, creating an overlap with Highway 50 and terminating at Highway 147 near Horseshoe Lake. The area around Horseshoe Lake with Highway 38 and Highway 147 was renumbered in 1959 "for the convenience and guidance of the traveling public". This rerouting was changed in 1963 to "eliminate confusion" near Horseshoe Lake, resulting in the creation of Highway 131 and rerouting Highway 147.

== Major intersections ==
Mile markers reset at some concurrencies.

County	Location	mi	km	Destinations	Notes
Lonoke	Cabot	0.0	0.0	I-57 / US 67 / US 167 – Beebe, Little Rock	Western terminus; exit 21 on I-57
Lonoke	Cabot	0.6	0.97	AR 367 – Cabot, Austin, Beebe	Former US 67
Lonoke	Ward	3.0	4.8	AR 319 north – Ward	Southern terminus of AR 319
Lonoke		5.0	8.0	AR 321 south	Northern terminus of AR 321
Lonoke		8.2	13.2	AR 31 – Beebe, Lonoke	
Prairie	Hickory Plains	16.3	26.2	AR 13 – Beebe, Carlisle	
Prairie	Hayley	21.1	34.0	AR 86 east	Western terminus of AR 86
Prairie	Fourmile Corner	26.7	43.0	AR 11 south – Hazen, Wattensaw Wildlife Management Area	Western end of AR 11 concurrency
Prairie	Des Arc	29.3	47.2	AR 323 south – Des Arc Business District, Lower White River Museum State Park	Northern terminus of AR 323
Prairie	Des Arc	29.8	48.0	AR 11 north to AR 323 – Searcy, Des Arc Business District, Lake Des Arc	Eastern end of AR 11 concurrency; access to AR 323 via AR 323Y
Prairie		30.7– 30.9	49.4– 49.7	Bridge over the White River	
Prairie		32.7	52.6	AR 33 south – Biscoe	Western end of AR 33 concurrency
Prairie–Woodruff county line	Little Dixie	39.4	63.4	AR 33 north – Augusta	Eastern end of AR 33 concurrency
Woodruff	Cotton Plant	45.5	73.2	AR 306 east	Western terminus of AR 306
Woodruff	Cotton Plant	45.6	73.4	AR 17 south – Brinkley	Western end of AR 17 concurrency
Woodruff		0.0	0.0	AR 17 north – Patterson	Eastern end of AR 17 concurrency
Monroe	No major junctions				
Woodruff		4.6	7.4	US 49 – Fair Oaks, Brinkley	Eastern terminus
Gap in route
St. Francis		0.00	0.00	CR 419	Continuation north
St. Francis		0.21	0.34	I-40 – Memphis, Little Rock	Exit 247 on I-40
St. Francis		0.53	0.85	US 70 – Memphis, Madison	
St. Francis	Widener	2.44	3.93	AR 50 west	Western end of AR 50 concurrency
St. Francis				AR 75 north	Southern terminus of AR 75
St. Francis		0.00	0.00	AR 50 east to AR 149 – Wildwood	Eastern end of AR 50 concurrency
St. Francis	Hughes	11.26	18.12	US 79 south – Marianna	Western end of US 79 concurrency
St. Francis	Hughes	0.00	0.00	US 79 north – West Memphis	Eastern end of US 79 concurrency
St. Francis	Hughes	0.55	0.89	AR 149 north (Blackwood Street)	Southern terminus of AR 149
Crittenden		7.77	12.50	AR 147 (Horseshoe Circle)	Eastern terminus
Crittenden	Gap in route				
Crittenden	West Memphis	0.0	0.0	US 70 (Broadway Avenue)	Southern terminus
Crittenden	West Memphis	0.3	0.48	I-55 (US 61 / US 64 / US 78 / US 79) – Little Rock, Memphis	Exit 4 on I-55
Crittenden	West Memphis	0.8	1.3	I-40 – Little Rock, Memphis	Northern terminus; exit 280 on I-40
1.000 mi = 1.609 km; 1.000 km = 0.621 mi: Concurrency terminus

== See also ==
- List of state highways in Arkansas
