= U.S. Route 79 in Arkansas =

U.S. Highway 79

Route information
- Maintained by ArDOT
- Length: 273 mi (439 km)

Major junctions
- South end: US 79 at the Louisiana state line near Haynesville, LA
- US 82 in Magnolia; US 278 in Camden; I-530 / US 65 in Pine Bluff; US 63 in Pine Bluff; US 63 in Stuttgart; I-40 near Jennette; I-55 / US 61 / US 64 / US 78 in West Memphis
- North end: I-55 / US 61 / US 64 / US 70 / US 78 / US 79 at the Tennessee state line in Memphis, TN

Location
- Country: United States
- State: Arkansas
- Counties: Columbia, Ouachita, Calhoun, Dallas, Cleveland, Jefferson, Arkansas, Prairie, Monroe, Lee, St. Francis, Crittenden

Highway system
- United States Numbered Highway System; List; Special; Divided; Arkansas Highway System; Interstate; US; State; Business; Spurs; Suffixed; Scenic; Heritage
← AR 78	→ AR 80

U.S. Highway 79 (US 79) runs northeast to southwest through southern and eastern Arkansas for about 273 miles (439 km). The route begins at the Louisiana state line north of Haynesville, LA, and ends at the Tennessee state line concurrent with several other routes at the Memphis & Arkansas Bridge. A portion of the highway is designated as part of the Camden Expedition Scenic Highway within the Arkansas Scenic Byways system.

== Route description ==
=== Louisiana to Pine Bluff ===
US 79 continues north from Louisiana and heads in a northerly direction. The route travels to the city of Magnolia, sharing a short concurrency with US 82 before turning in a more northeasterly direction. The route passes through the cities of McNeil and Stephens, before reaching the city of Camden and forming a short concurrency with US 278. The route continues northeast, intersecting multiple highways and passing through several communities such as Bearden, Thornton, Fordyce, and Rison before reaching I-530 in Pine Bluff, forming an overlapping concurrency with both I-530, US 65, and US 63 a few miles later.

=== Pine Bluff to Memphis ===
After intersecting US 63, both routes share a concurrency for about 38 miles (61 km) before splitting apart in Stuttgart. The route travels through more communities such as Ulm, Clarendon, and Marianna, intersecting US 49 along the way. US 79 shares a very short concurrency with AR 1 in Marianna before continuing towards Memphis. After passing through Hughes, US 79 intersects I-40 (and AR 218) just south of Jennette, and shares a concurrency with I-40 until reaching West Memphis. I-40 and I-55 split immediately before crossing the Mississippi River, and US 79 is concurrent with I-55 at the split along with US 61, US 64, US 70, and as of late 2023, US 78.

The entire route including concurrencies is about 273 miles (439 km) long.

== Major intersections ==
County	Location	mi	km	Exit	Destinations	Notes
Columbia		0.0	0.0		US 79 south – Haynesville, Minden	Continuation from Louisiana
Columbia	Emerson	6.0	9.7		AR 98 – Atlanta, Walkerville	
Columbia	Magnolia	15.2	24.5		AR 980 – Magnolia Municipal Airport	AR 980 southern terminus
Columbia	Magnolia	16.6	26.7		US 79B to AR 19 south – Magnolia	
Columbia	Magnolia	18.3	29.5		US 82 east / US 82B – Magnolia, El Dorado	Southern end of US 82 concurrency
Columbia	Magnolia	20.5	33.0		US 82 west to US 371 – Lewisville, Texarkana	Northern end of US 82 concurrency
Columbia	McNeil	23.9	38.5		AR 98 west – McNeil, Waldo	Southern end of AR 98 concurrency
Columbia	McNeil	24.1	38.8		CR 47 (Unsigned AR 600) – Logoly State Park	
Columbia	McNeil	24.3	39.1		AR 98B – McNeil	
Columbia		23.9	38.5		AR 98 east – Village	Northern end of AR 98 concurrency
Ouachita	Stephens	34.1	54.9		AR 57 south – Mount Holly	Southern end of AR 57 concurrency
Ouachita	Stephens	35.2	56.6		AR 57 north – Chidester	Northern end of AR 57 concurrency
Ouachita	Camden	47.8	76.9		AR 376 – Camden	
Ouachita	Camden	52.5	84.5		US 278 west / US 79B to AR 24 – Camden, Hope, Prescott	Southern end of US 278 concurrency; interchange
Ouachita	Camden	53.6	86.3		AR 7 – El Dorado, Arkadelphia	Interchange
Ouachita	Camden	57.7	92.9		US 278 east to AR 274 – Hampton, Warren, Monticello	Northern end of US 278 concurrency; partial interchange
Ouachita	Camden	58.0	93.3		US 79B – Camden	
Ouachita		62.2	100.1		AR 205 south	AR 205 northern terminus
Ouachita	Eagle Mills	64.5	103.8		AR 9 north – Holly Springs, Princeton, Malvern	AR 9 southern terminus
Ouachita	Bearden	69.4	111.7		US 79B – Bearden	
Ouachita	Bearden	71.2	114.6		AR 203 – Bearden, Holly Springs	
Calhoun		73.3	118.0		US 79B – Bearden	
Calhoun	Thornton	78.7	126.7		US 79B to US 167B – Thornton	
Calhoun	Thornton	79.1	127.3		AR 205 – Thornton	
Calhoun		80.8	130.0		US 79B – Thornton	
Calhoun		81.2	130.7		US 167 south – Hampton, El Dorado	Southern end of US 167 concurrency, southbound access only; interchange
Dallas	Fordyce	82.7	133.1		US 79B / AR 273 west – Fordyce	AR 273 eastern terminus
Dallas	Fordyce	84.3	135.7		AR 8 – Fordyce, Warren, Arkadelphia	
Dallas	Fordyce	85.3	137.3		US 167 north / US 79B – Sheridan, Little Rock	Northern end of US 167 concurrency
Cleveland	Kingsland	92.2	148.4		AR 189 – Kingsland, Hebron	
Cleveland	Kingsland	93.2	150.0		AR 97 south – Kingsland, Marks' Mills State Park	AR 97 northern terminus
Cleveland	Rison	101.8	163.8		AR 35 – Rison, Sheridan, Monticello	
Cleveland		108.7	174.9		AR 212 west – Staves	AR 212 eastern terminus
Jefferson		115.0	185.1		AR 54 east – Pinebergen	Southern end of AR 54 concurrency
Jefferson	Pine Bluff	121.0	194.7		AR 54 west	Northern end of AR 54 concurrency
Jefferson	Pine Bluff	121.3	195.2	39	I-530 north / US 65 north / US 79B – Pine Bluff, Little Rock	Southern end of I-530 and US 65 concurrency
Jefferson	Pine Bluff	122.4	197.0	41	Old Warren Road	
Jefferson	Pine Bluff	123.5	198.8	42	South Hazel Street	
Jefferson	Pine Bluff	124.6	200.5	43	US 63 south / AR 463 north – Pine Bluff, Warren, El Dorado	Southern end of US 63 concurrency, AR 463 southern terminus
Jefferson	Pine Bluff	125.6	202.1	44	AR 530 south – Star City, Monticello	Interchange; AR 530 northern terminus
Jefferson	Pine Bluff	127.9	205.8	46	US 65 south / US 425 south / AR 190 west (Harding Avenue) – Dumas, McGehee, Lake Village, Pine Bluff	Northern end of US 65 concurrency; southern end of US 65B concurrency; interchange; southern terminus of I-530; US 425 northern terminus; AR 190 eastern terminus
Jefferson	Pine Bluff	128.9	207.4		US 65B north – Pine Bluff	Northern end of US 65B concurrency
Jefferson	Pine Bluff	130.7	210.3		AR 81 south	AR 81 northern terminus
Jefferson	Arkansas River	134.0	215.7	Bridge over the Arkansas River		
Jefferson	Altheimer	139.5	224.5		US 79B to AR 15 / AR 88 – Altheimer, England, Reydell	
Jefferson	Altheimer	142.1	228.7		US 79B – Altheimer	
Jefferson–Arkansas county line	Humphrey	151.6	244.0		Division Street north	Former AR 13
Arkansas	Humphrey	152.4	245.3		AR 13 north – Humnoke	AR 13 southern terminus, former AR 169
Arkansas		153.0	246.2		AR 152 east	AR 152 western terminus
Arkansas		159.0	255.9		AR 343 south	AR 343 northern terminus
Arkansas		159.7	257.0		US 79B – Stuttgart	
Arkansas	Stuttgart	162.6	261.7		US 63 north – Hazen	Northern end of US 63 concurrency
Arkansas	Stuttgart	163.7	263.4		US 165 south – DeWitt	
Arkansas	Stuttgart	163.9	263.8		US 165 north – England, North Little Rock	
Arkansas		164.6	264.9		AR 146 east	AR 146 western terminus
Arkansas	Roe	175.6	282.6		AR 33 south – Casscoe, DeWitt	Southern end of AR 33 concurrency
Arkansas		178.0	286.5		AR 33 north – De Valls Bluff	Northern end of AR 33 concurrency
Arkansas	White River	182.8	294.2	Bridge over the White River		
Monroe	Clarendon	183.2	294.8		US 79B to AR 302 – Clarendon	
Monroe	Clarendon	183.6	295.5		US 79B – Clarendon	
Monroe	Clarendon	184.5	296.9		AR 86 west	Western end of AR 86 concurrency
Monroe	Clarendon	184.6	297.1		AR 86 east – Holly Grove	Eastern end of AR 86 concurrency
Monroe		186.5	300.1		AR 17 north – Brinkley	Western end of AR 17 concurrency
Monroe		189.5	305.0		AR 17 south – Holly Grove	Eastern end of AR 17 concurrency
Monroe		192.5	309.8		US 49 – Helena-West Helena, Brinkley	
Monroe	Monroe	195.8	315.1		AR 39 – Rich, Blackton	
Lee		204.0	328.3		AR 238 west – Moro	AR 238 eastern terminus
Lee		205.2	330.2		AR 78 west – Moro, Wheatley	AR 78 eastern terminus
Lee	Smith Corner	208.5	335.5		AR 121 north – Palestine	Western end of AR 121 concurrency
Lee		209.0	336.4		AR 121 south – Aubrey, Rondo	Eastern end of AR 121 concurrency
Lee	Marianna	215.0	346.0		AR 243 north	AR 243 southern terminus
Lee	Marianna	216.2	347.9		AR 1 south / AR 1B – Marianna, Helena-West Helena	Southern end of AR 1 concurrency
Lee	Marianna	216.5	348.4		AR 1 north – Forrest City	Northern end of AR 1 concurrency
Lee	L'Anguille River	219.7	353.6	Bridge over the L'Anguille River		
Lee		220.0	354.1		AR 121 south – W.G. Huxtable Pumping Station	AR 121 northern terminus
Lee	St. Francis River	225.8	363.4	Bridge over the St. Francis River		
Lee	Brickeys	227.9	366.8		AR 131 south – Brickeys	AR 131 northern terminus
Lee–St. Francis county line	Winona	233.4	375.6		AR 334 east – Council	AR 334 western terminus
St. Francis	Hughes	237.4	382.1		AR 38 – Hughes, Widener	
St. Francis		239.5	385.4		AR 149 – Hughes, Greasy Corner	
St. Francis	Chatfield	243.5	391.9		AR 50 – Widener, Simsboro	
St. Francis–Crittenden county line	Shearerville	253.3	407.6		US 70 – West Memphis, Forrest City	
Crittenden	Shearerville	253.5	408.0		I-40 / AR 218 east – Little Rock, Memphis, Jennette	Western end of I-40 concurrency
Crittenden	Lehi	259.3	417.3	271	AR 147 – Lehi	
Crittenden	West Memphis	263.1	423.4	275	AR 118 – West Memphis, Marion	
Crittenden	West Memphis	264.6	425.8	276	To AR 77 (Missouri Street) / Rich Road	Eastbound exit only; signed as exit 278 westbound
Crittenden	West Memphis	265.0	426.5	277	I-55 north / US 61 north / US 64 west / US 78 west – Blytheville, St. Louis	Western end of I-55, US 61, US 64, and US 78 concurrencies
Crittenden	West Memphis	266.3	428.6	278	AR 191 / 7th Street	Solely signed as AR 191 eastbound, includes AR 77 westbound
Crittenden	West Memphis	267.2	430.0	279A	Ingram Boulevard	Signed as exit 5 westbound
Crittenden	West Memphis	268.0	431.3	279B	I-40 east – Memphis, Nashville	Eastbound exit only; eastern end of I-40 concurrency
Crittenden	West Memphis	268.5	432.1	4	AR 38 to US 70 / Martin Luther King Jr. Drive	
Crittenden	West Memphis	269.6	433.9	3B	US 70 west / Broadway Avenue	Northbound exit only; northern end of US 70 concurrency
Crittenden	West Memphis	269.9	434.4	3A	AR 131 / Mound City Road	Northbound exit only
Crittenden	West Memphis	271.5	436.9	1	Bridgeport Road / Mississippi River Turnaround	
Mississippi River		272.8	439.0	Memphis & Arkansas Bridge; Arkansas–Tennessee line		
Mississippi River		272.8	439.0		I-55 south / US 61 south / US 64 east / US 70 east / US 78 east / US 79 north – Memphis	Continuation into Tennessee
1.000 mi = 1.609 km; 1.000 km = 0.621 mi: Concurrency terminus; Incomplete access
