= Arkansas Highway 149 =

State highway in Arkansas, United States

Highway 149

Route information
- Maintained by ArDOT

Major junctions
- South end: AR 38 in Hughes
- US 79 at North Hughes; US 70; I-40; US 64 in Earle; I-555 in Marked Tree
- North end: AR 140 / AR 14 / AR 75 in Marked Tree

Location
- Country: United States
- State: Arkansas
- Counties: St. Francis, Crittenden, Poinsett

Highway system
- Arkansas Highway System; Interstate; US; State; Business; Spurs; Suffixed; Scenic; Heritage
← AR 148	→ AR 150

Highway 149 (AR 149, Ark. 149, and Hwy. 149) is a north–south state highway in northeast Arkansas. The route of about 41.28 miles (66.43 km) runs from Highway 38 in Hughes north across Interstate 40 (I-40) and I-555 to AR 140/AR 75/AR 14 in Marked Tree.

== Route description ==
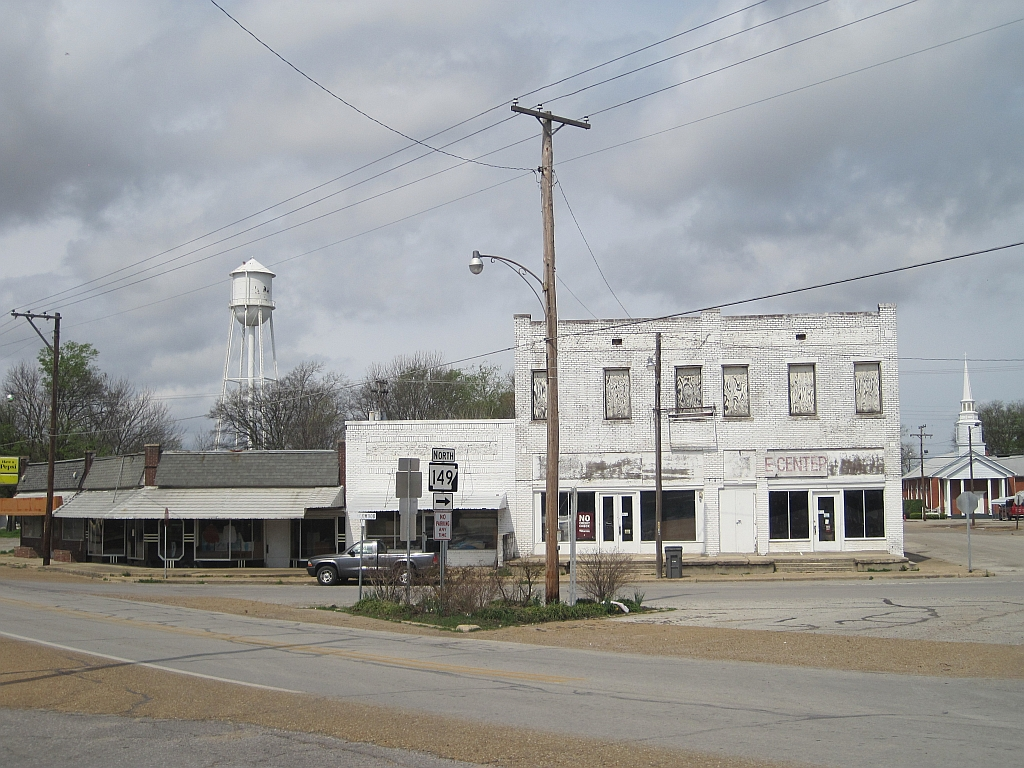
The southern terminus of Highway 149 at Highway 38 in Hughes

The route begins in Hughes at Highway 38 and runs northeast across US Route 79 (US 79) at North Hughes. Highway 149 continues north to Greasy Corner, where a 3.56-mile (5.73 km) concurrency begins with Highway 50 west along a bayou. After the concurrency ends, Highway 149 turns due north and runs through fields. Another overlap occurs near Shell Lake, where Highway 149 overlaps US 70 for 0.21 miles (0.34 km). US 70/AR 149 run briefly as a frontage road for Interstate 40/US 79 (I-40/US 79) before Highway 149 turns north and runs over the limited-access route. Shortly after this junction the route enters Crittenden County and runs north to Earle.

In Earle Highway 149 has a short officially designated exception over U.S. Route 64B (US 64B). The concurrent routes passes near the Crittenden County Museum, listed on the National Register of Historic Places (NRHP) before Highway 149 turns north onto Barton Street, ending the concurrency. Highway 149 has a junction with US 64 just prior to leaving Earle, and the highway passes the George Berry Washington Memorial (also NRHP-listed) shortly after leaving the city. The road curves through Arkansas Delta countryside to a concurrency with Highway 42, beginning at Three Forks. Upon entering Poinsett County, Highway 149 serves as the western terminus of Highway 322 at Mt. Olive. The road continues north to enter Marked Tree, where it has a junction with I-555. It then travels into the town before terminating at AR 140/AR 75/AR 14.

== Major intersections ==
Mile markers reset at concurrencies.

County	Location	mi	km	Destinations	Notes
St. Francis	Hughes	0.00	0.00	AR 38 (Main Street)	Southern terminus
St. Francis	North Hughes	1.67	2.69	US 79 – Marianna, Lehi	
St. Francis	Greasy Corner	4.51	7.26	AR 50 east	Begin AR 50 concurrency
St. Francis	AR 50 concurrency west, 3.56 miles (5.73 km)				
St. Francis		0.00	0.00	AR 50 west – Widener	End AR 50 concurrency
St. Francis	Shell Lake	7.10	11.43	US 70 west – Forrest City	Begin US 70 concurrency
St. Francis	Shell Lake	US 70 concurrency east, 0.21 miles (0.34 km)			
St. Francis	Shell Lake	0.00	0.00	US 70 east – West Memphis	End US 70 concurrency
St. Francis		0.20	0.32	I-40 – Memphis, Little Rock	
Crittenden	Earle	10.74	17.28	US 64B east (2nd Street)	Begin US 64B concurrency
Crittenden	Earle	11.20	18.02	US 64B west (2nd Street)	End US 64B concurrency
Crittenden	Earle	11.55	18.59	US 64 – Wynne, Marion	
Crittenden	Three Forks	16.15	25.99	AR 42 west – Twist	Begin AR 42 concurrency
Crittenden		19.16	30.84	AR 42 east – Turrell	End AR 42 concurrency
Poinsett	Mt. Olive	27.30	43.94	AR 322 east	AR 322 western terminus
Poinsett	Marked Tree	29.67	47.75	I-555 – Memphis, Jonesboro	
Poinsett	Marked Tree			AR 75 south / AR 14 / AR 140 east	Northern terminus, AR 140 western terminus, northern terminus of AR 75
1.000 mi = 1.609 km; 1.000 km = 0.621 mi: Concurrency terminus

== See also ==
- List of state highways in Arkansas
