= Shell Lake, Arkansas =

- Unincorporated community
- Location within Arkansas Location within the United States
- Coordinates: 35°07′45″N 90°29′20″W
- Country: United States
- State: Arkansas
- County: St. Francis
- Elevation: 207 ft (63 m)
- Time zone: UTC-6 (Central (CST))
  - Summer (DST): UTC-5 (CDT)
- Area code: 870
- GNIS feature ID: 82968

Shell Lake is an unincorporated community in St. Francis County, Arkansas, United States. Shell Lake is located at the junction of U.S. Route 70 and Arkansas Highway 149, 11 miles (18 km) south of Earle.
