= Northern Ohio =

Northern Ohio may refer to:

- A region of Ohio, see Northeast Ohio and Northwest Ohio
- Northern Ohio, Arkansas, an unincorporated community
