= List of lakes of St. Francis County, Arkansas =

There are at least 41 named lakes and reservoirs in St. Francis County, Arkansas.

== Lakes ==
- Beaty Lake (Arkansas), 35°04′20″N 090°42′29″W, el. 194 feet (59 m)
- Beaver Lake, 35°00′25″N 090°34′51″W, el. 190 feet (58 m)
- Beaver Lake, 35°07′54″N 090°36′43″W, el. 197 feet (60 m)
- Big Bear Lake, 35°08′32″N 090°38′49″W, el. 200 feet (61 m)
- Big Lake, 34°58′25″N 090°36′28″W, el. 184 feet (56 m)
- Blackfish Lake, 35°07′20″N 090°27′08″W, el. 184 feet (56 m)
- Brushy Lake, 35°00′26″N 090°39′53″W, el. 180 feet (55 m)
- Burnt Cane Lake, 35°01′13″N 090°37′50″W, el. 174 feet (53 m)
- Bushy Lake, 35°07′45″N 090°39′25″W, el. 187 feet (57 m)
- Don Lake, 34°54′42″N 090°40′12″W, el. 190 feet (58 m)
- Donahue Lake, 34°59′56″N 090°31′04″W, el. 164 feet (50 m)
- Fishing Lake, 35°07′30″N 090°38′39″W, el. 190 feet (58 m)
- Horseshoe Lake, 35°00′33″N 090°38′48″W, el. 180 feet (55 m)
- Horseshoe Lake, 35°07′18″N 090°40′00″W, el. 190 feet (58 m)
- Island Lake, 34°59′57″N 090°39′51″W, el. 184 feet (56 m)
- Kiethley Lake, 35°01′42″N 090°42′00″W, el. 200 feet (61 m)
- Little Bear Lake, 35°07′55″N 090°38′46″W, el. 207 feet (63 m)
- Long Lake, 34°55′33″N 090°39′56″W, el. 190 feet (58 m)
- Long Lake, 34°59′41″N 090°40′17″W, el. 184 feet (56 m)
- Mud Lake, 34°55′42″N 090°31′44″W, el. 171 feet (52 m)
- Nichols Lake, 35°06′54″N 090°30′14″W, el. 180 feet (55 m)
- Old River, 34°56′29″N 090°39′13″W, el. 171 feet (52 m)
- Pettijohn Lake, 35°02′01″N 090°37′07″W, el. 194 feet (59 m)
- Round Pond, 35°03′18″N 090°36′40″W, el. 200 feet (61 m)
- Round Pond Lake, 35°04′38″N 090°38′04″W, el. 190 feet (58 m)
- Rush Lake, 35°06′08″N 090°36′44″W, el. 197 feet (60 m)
- Shell Lake, 35°08′23″N 090°29′41″W, el. 197 feet (60 m)
- Skinny Lake, 34°58′46″N 090°41′59″W, el. 194 feet (59 m)
- Taylor Lake, 34°55′50″N 090°26′08″W, el. 194 feet (59 m)
- Thompson Lake, 35°08′31″N 090°32′30″W, el. 200 feet (61 m)
- Wiggins Lake, 35°06′10″N 090°34′09″W, el. 194 feet (59 m)

== Reservoirs ==
- Cole Lake, 34°55′20″N 090°57′22″W, el. 203 feet (62 m)
- Forest Lake Number 3, 35°01′05″N 090°45′08″W, el. 299 feet (91 m)
- Forest Lake Number 4, 35°01′02″N 090°44′46″W, el. 262 feet (80 m)
- Forest Lake Number 5, 35°00′55″N 090°45′33″W, el. 325 feet (99 m)
- Forest Lake Number 6, 35°00′33″N 090°46′00″W, el. 348 feet (106 m)
- Hickey Lake, 35°01′46″N 090°46′57″W, el. 305 feet (93 m)
- Lake Saint Francis, 35°04′37″N 090°45′40″W, el. 305 feet (93 m)
- Loeb Lake, 34°59′19″N 090°44′31″W, el. 269 feet (82 m)
- Scenic Hills Lake, 35°03′26″N 090°43′48″W, el. 348 feet (106 m)
- Telico Lake, 35°04′53″N 090°48′17″W, el. 272 feet (83 m)

== See also ==
- List of lakes in Arkansas
