= U.S. Route 70 in Arkansas =

US Highway section within the state of Arkansas

U.S. Highway 70
- US 70 highlighted in red

Route information
- Maintained by ArDOT
- Length: 287.2 mi (462.2 km)
- Existed: 1926–present

Major junctions
- West end: US 70 at the Oklahoma state line near De Queen
- US 270 in Hot Springs; I-30 near Haskell; I-430 / AR 5 in Little Rock; I-630 in Little Rock; I-30 / US 65 / US 67 / US 167 in North Little Rock; I-440 in North Little Rock; US 63 in Hazen; US 49 in Brinkley; US 79 / AR 218 in Jennette; I-55 / US 61 / US 64 / US 78 / US 79 in West Memphis
- East end: I-55 / US 61 / US 64 / US 70 / US 78 / US 79 / SR 1 at the Tennessee state line in West Memphis

Location
- Country: United States
- State: Arkansas
- Counties: Sevier, Howard, Pike, Montgomery, Hot Spring, Garland, Saline, Pulaski, Lonoke, Prairie, Monroe, St. Francis, Crittenden

Highway system
- United States Numbered Highway System; List; Special; Divided; Arkansas Highway System; Interstate; US; State; Business; Spurs; Suffixed; Scenic; Heritage
← AR 69	→ US 71

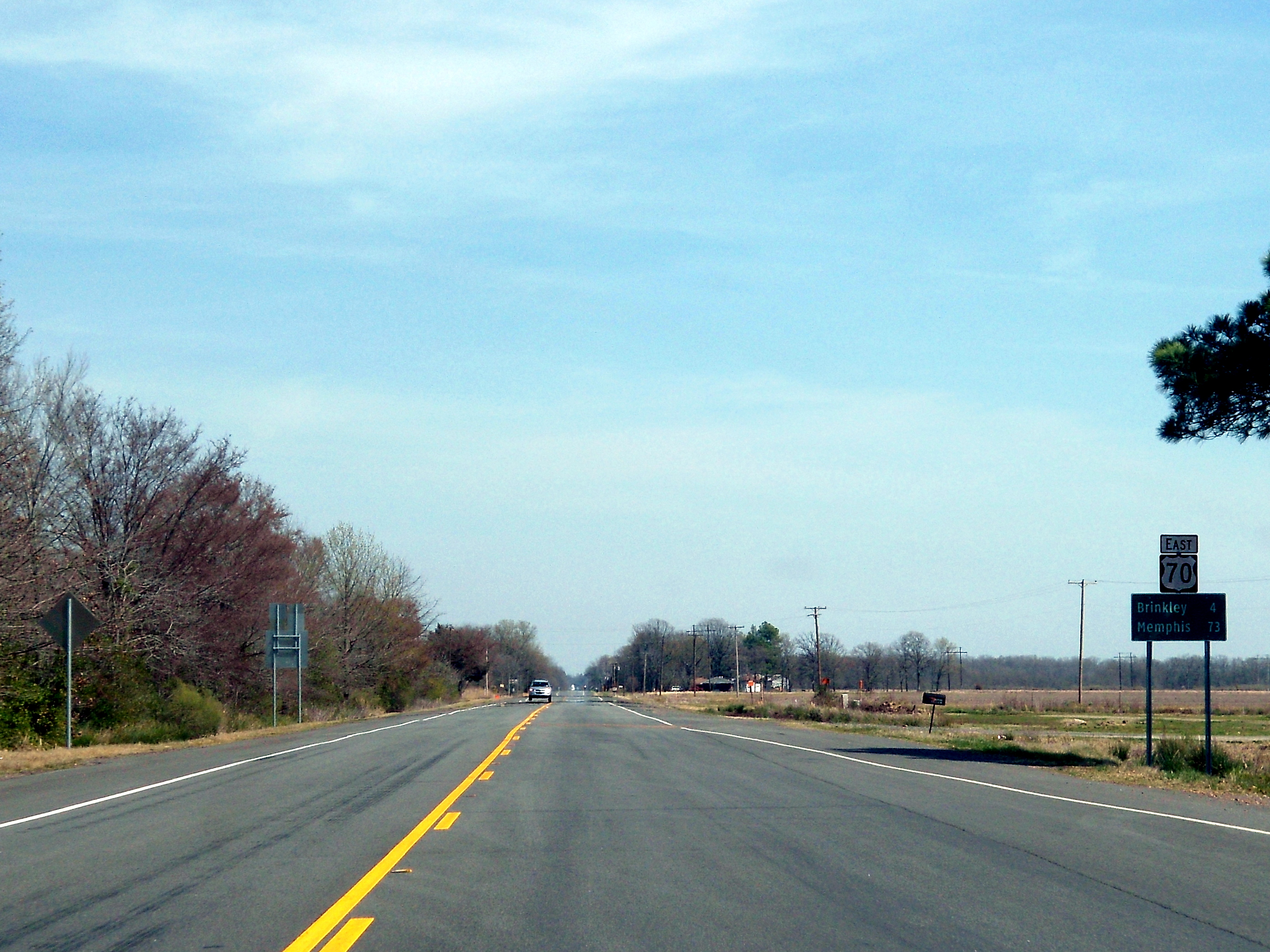
U.S. 70 west of Brinkley

U.S. Route 70 (US 70) runs east–west through across the heart of Arkansas for 287.2 miles (462.2 km). US 70 enters the state from Oklahoma west of De Queen, and exits to Tennessee at Memphis, running concurrently with Interstate 55 (I-55), US 61, US 64, US 78, and US 79. The highway passes through the major cities of Hot Springs, Little Rock, North Little Rock, and West Memphis.

Between Oklahoma and Hot Springs National Park, US 70 is largely rural and two-lane. The route bypasses much of the city to the south and then serves as the arterial road between Hot Springs National Park and Little Rock. The highway runs concurrently with I-30 between a place north of Haskell to southwestern Little Rock, where it splits to traverse through downtown Little Rock and North Little Rock. Between North Little Rock and its merge into I-55 at West Memphis, the route is principally two-lane and has been supplanted by I-40, which always runs within a few miles of the highway.

== Major intersections ==
County	Location	mi	km	Exit	Destinations	Notes
Sevier		0.0	0.0		US 70 west – Broken Bow, Hugo	Continuation into Oklahoma
Sevier		5.3	8.5		US 70B east – De Queen Business District	Western terminus of US 70B; Business District not signed westbound
Sevier	De Queen	6.5	10.5		AR 399 south (College Drive) – Cossatot Community College	Northern terminus of AR 399
Sevier	De Queen	8.6	13.8		US 59 north / US 71 north / US 70B west (North Lakeside Drive) to AR 41 – Foreman, Fort Smith, Mena	Western end of US 59/US 71/US 371 concurrency; northern terminus of US 371; eastern terminus of US 70B; Mena not signed westbound
Sevier		16.6	26.7		US 59 south / US 71 south / US 371 south – Texarkana	Eastern end of US 59/US 71/US 371 concurrency
Howard	Dierks	28.5	45.9		US 278 east (East Fourth Street)	Western end of US 278 concurrency
Howard		31.8	51.2		US 278 west – Umpire, Wickes	Eastern end of US 278 concurrency
Pike	Newhope	40.8	65.7		AR 369 south	Western end of AR 369 concurrency
Pike		45.0	72.4		AR 369 north – Langley	Eastern end of AR 369 concurrency
Pike	Kirby	55.3	89.0		AR 27 south / AR 84 east – Murfreesboro, Amity	Western end of AR 84 concurrency; northern terminus of AR 27
Pike	Salem	59.9	96.4		AR 84 west – Langley	Eastern end of AR 84 concurrency
Pike	Glenwood	64.0	103.0		AR 8 east – Amity	Western end of AR 8 concurrency
Pike	Glenwood	64.2	103.3		US 70B east (Elm Street) / AR 8 west to AR 27	Eastern end of AR 8 concurrency; western terminus of US 70B
Pike	Glenwood	65.2	104.9		US 70B west (East Broadway) – Glenwood Business District	Eastern terminus of US 70B; Business District not signed eastbound
Montgomery		71.1	114.4		AR 182 east – Amity	Western terminus of AR 182
Hot Spring	No major junctions					
Garland	Hempwallace	85.5	137.6		AR 227 north (Sunshine Road) – Sunshine	Southern terminus of AR 227
Garland		89.7	144.4		AR 192 east (Marion Anderson Road)	Western terminus of AR 192
Garland	Hot Springs	91.0– 91.3	146.5– 146.9	Lake Hamilton		
Garland	Hot Springs	91.8	147.7	Western end of freeway section		
Garland	Hot Springs	91.8	147.7	2	US 270 west / US 70B east (Airport Road) – Mount Ida	Western end of US 270 concurrency; western terminus of US 70B
Garland	Hot Springs	93.3– 93.8	150.2– 151.0	3	McLeod Street	
Garland	Hot Springs	94.4– 94.9	151.9– 152.7	4	AR 88 (Higdon Ferry Road)	
Garland	Hot Springs	95.2– 95.6	153.2– 153.9	5	AR 7 (Central Avenue)	Signed as exits 5A (south) and 5B (north)
Garland	Hot Springs	97.5– 98.0	156.9– 157.7	7	AR 128 (Carpenter Dam Road)	
Garland	Hot Springs	99.5– 99.9	160.1– 160.8	9	US 270 east / US 270B west (Malvern Avenue)	Eastern end of US 270 concurrency; eastern terminus of US 270B
Garland		102.0– 102.4	164.2– 164.8	11 (EB); 6 (WB)	US 70B west / AR 5 north – Hot Springs, Fountain Lake, Hot Springs Village	Signed as exits 11B (west) and 11A (north) eastbound, exits 6A (west) and 6B (north) westbound
Garland		102.8	165.4	Eastern end of freeway section		
Garland		112.7	181.4		AR 128 west – Fountain Lake	Eastern terminus of AR 128
Saline		114.1	183.6		AR 88 west – Lonsdale	Eastern terminus of AR 88
Saline		121.4	195.4	Western end of freeway section		
Saline		121.4	195.4	111	I-30 west – Texarkana	Western end of I-30 concurrency
see I-30 and I-430
Pulaski	Little Rock	140.5	226.1	1	I-430 north / AR 5 south (Stagecoach Road)	Eastern end of I-430 concurrency; northern terminus of AR 5
Pulaski	Little Rock	140.5	226.1	Eastern end of freeway section		
Pulaski	Little Rock	143.2	230.5		AR 300 west (Colonel Glenn Road)	Eastern terminus of AR 300
Pulaski	Little Rock	149.1	240.0		AR 367 south (Arch Street)	Northern terminus of AR 367; former US 167
Pulaski	Little Rock	149.2	240.1		AR 365 south (Roosevelt Road)	Western end of AR 365 concurrency; former US 65 south
Pulaski	Little Rock	150.2	241.7		I-630	Exit 1B on I-630
Pulaski	Little Rock	151.0	243.0		AR 10 west (La Harpe Boulevard)	Interchange; southbound exit only
Pulaski	Little Rock–North Little Rock line	151.0– 151.4	243.0– 243.7	Broadway Bridge over Arkansas River		
Pulaski	North Little Rock	151.4	243.7		AR 365 north (Broadway Street)	Eastern end of AR 365 concurrency; former US 65 north
Pulaski	North Little Rock	152.0	244.6		I-30 (US 65 / US 67 / US 167) to I-40 – Little Rock, Hot Springs, Texarkana, Shorter College	Signed for Hot Springs/Texarkana westbound, Shorter College eastbound; exit 141 on I-30
Pulaski	North Little Rock	154.4	248.5		US 165 south (Baucum Pike) – England, Stuttgart	Northern terminus of US 165
Pulaski	North Little Rock	155.9	250.9		To I-40	Access via Jacksonville Highway
Pulaski	North Little Rock	158.0– 158.2	254.3– 254.6		I-440 to I-40 – Little Rock	Exit 10 on I-440
Pulaski	Galloway	160.2	257.8		AR 391 to I-40	
Lonoke		167.5	269.6		AR 15 to I-40 – England, Cabot	
Lonoke		172.6	277.8		AR 31 south – Pettus	Western end of AR 31 concurrency
Lonoke	Lonoke	173.0	278.4		Fish Hatchery Road (AR 943 east)	
Lonoke	Lonoke	173.8	279.7		AR 89 north to I-40	Southern terminus of AR 89
Lonoke	Lonoke	174.8	281.3		AR 31 north (North Center Street)	Eastern end of AR 31 concurrency
Lonoke		180.1	289.8		AR 381 south – Culler	Northern terminus of AR 381
Lonoke	Carlisle	183.2	294.8		AR 13 to I-40 – Humnoke	
Prairie		187.5	301.8		AR 86 east to AR 343 – Slovak	Western terminus of AR 86
Prairie		189.5	305.0		AR 980 – Airport	Northern terminus of AR 980
Prairie	Hazen	192.5	309.8		AR 249 north	Southern terminus of AR 249
Prairie	Hazen	193.7	311.7		US 63 to I-40 – Des Arc	Western end of US 63 concurrency
Prairie	Hazen	194.5– 194.8	313.0– 313.5		US 63 south – Stuttgart	Eastern end of US 63 concurrency
Prairie	De Valls Bluff	199.8	321.5		AR 33 south – Roe, Clarendon	Western end of AR 33 concurrency
Prairie	De Valls Bluff	201.2	323.8		Glover-Roberts Bridge over the White River	
Prairie	Biscoe	203.9	328.1		AR 33 north to I-40	Eastern end of AR 33 concurrency
Monroe		213.8	344.1		AR 17 south to US 79 – Clarendon, Pine Bluff	Northern terminus of AR 17; Pine Bluff not signed eastbound
Monroe	Brinkley	216.7	348.7		US 49 south – Helena–West Helena	Western end of US 49 concurrency
Monroe	Brinkley	217.4	349.9		AR 238 east (West Sycamore Street)	Western terminus of AR 238
Monroe	Brinkley	218.3	351.3		US 49 north (North Main Street) to I-40	Eastern end of US 49 concurrency
St. Francis	Wheatley	223.7	360.0		AR 78 to I-40 – Moro	
St. Francis		230.4	370.8		AR 259 south – Moro	Northern terminus of AR 259
St. Francis	Palestine	235.8	379.5		AR 261 to I-40 – Holub	
St. Francis	Forrest City	241.0– 241.3	387.9– 388.3		AR 1 to I-40 – Haynes, Marianna, Wynne, Jonesboro	Interchange
St. Francis	Forrest City	243.5	391.9		AR 1B (Washington Street) to I-40 west – Wynne, Jonesboro	Signed for I-40 eastbound, Wynne/Jonesboro westbound
St. Francis	Madison	247.1	397.7		AR 50	
St. Francis		250.4	403.0		AR 38 to I-40 – Widener	
St. Francis	Hicks Station	255.7	411.5		AR 75 south – Round Pond	Western end of AR 75 concurrency
St. Francis		259.7	417.9		I-40 / AR 75 north – Parkin	Eastern end of AR 75 concurrency; exit 256 on I-40
St. Francis	Shell Lake	263.2	423.6		AR 149 south – Hughes	Western end of AR 149 concurrency
St. Francis	Shell Lake	263.4	423.9		AR 149 north to I-40 – Earle	Eastern end of AR 149 concurrency
St. Francis		264.7	426.0		AR 357 south	Northern terminus of AR 357
Crittenden	Jennette	268.5	432.1		US 79 / AR 218 east to I-40 – Hughes	Western terminus of AR 218
Crittenden		273.6	440.3		AR 50 north – Crawfordsville	Southern terminus of AR 50
Crittenden	Lehi	274.5	441.8		I-40 west (US 79 south) / AR 147 to US 64 south – Horseshoe Lake, Hughes	Signed for US 64/Hughes westbound, Horseshoe Lake eastbound; exit 271 on I-40
Crittenden	Lehi	274.8	442.2		I-40 east (US 79 north) – Memphis	Eastbound exit only
Crittenden	West Memphis	278.4	448.0		AR 118 north (College Boulevard) to I-40 – West Memphis Airport	Southern terminus of AR 118
Crittenden	West Memphis	280.7	451.7		AR 77 north (North Missouri Street) / Great River Road north – Marion	Southern terminus of AR 77
Crittenden	West Memphis	281.2	452.5		AR 191 north (North Seventh Street)	Southern terminus of AR 191
Crittenden	West Memphis	283.2	455.8		AR 38 north to I-40 / I-55 north	Southern terminus of AR 38; I-55 not signed westbound
Crittenden	West Memphis	283.5– 284.2	456.2– 457.4		Western end of freeway section	
Crittenden	West Memphis	283.5– 284.2	456.2– 457.4	3B	I-55 north / US 61 north / US 64 west / US 78 west / US 79 south – West Memphis, St. Louis, MO	Westbound exit and eastbound entrance; western end of I-55/US 61/US 64/US 78/US 79 concurrency
Crittenden		285.8– 286.0	460.0– 460.3	1	Bridgeport Road	
Mississippi River		286.4– 287.2	460.9– 462.2	Memphis & Arkansas Bridge		
Mississippi River		286.4– 287.2	460.9– 462.2		I-55 south / US 61 south / US 64 east / US 70 east / US 78 east / US 79 north / SR 1 east – Memphis	Continuation into Tennessee
1.000 mi = 1.609 km; 1.000 km = 0.621 mi: Concurrency terminus

U.S. Route 70
Previous state: Oklahoma	Arkansas	Next state: Tennessee
