= Greasy Corner, Arkansas =

- Unincorporated community
- Location within Arkansas Location within the United States
- Coordinates: 35°00′26″N 90°26′54″W
- Country: United States
- State: Arkansas
- County: St. Francis
- Elevation: 200 ft (61 m)
- Time zone: UTC-6 (Central (CST))
  - Summer (DST): UTC-5 (CDT)
- Area code: 870
- GNIS feature ID: 83161

Greasy Corner is an unincorporated community in St. Francis County, Arkansas, United States. Greasy Corner is located at the junction of Arkansas Highways 50 and 149, 4.2 miles (6.8 km) north-northeast of Hughes.

== History ==
The community was originally named Mack's Corner for B. M. McCollum, a local landowner. McCollum ran a store, restaurant, and automobile repair shop out of the same building. It acquired its current name when a farmer dining in the restaurant was given a plate with a grease stain by an auto mechanic. He commented that the community should be called "Greasy Corner" instead; the name has been used ever since. It has frequently been noted on lists of unusual place names.
