= Beaty Lake (Arkansas) =

- Location within Arkansas
- Location: St. Francis County, Arkansas
- Coordinates: 35°04′20″N 90°42′29″W
- Type: Lake
- Basin countries: United States
- Surface elevation: 194 feet (59 m)

Beaty Lake is a lake in St. Francis County, Arkansas.
