= Arkansas Highway 75 =

State highway in Arkansas, United States

Highway 75

Route information
- Maintained by ArDOT
- Length: 43.393 mi (69.834 km)
- Existed: April 1, 1926–present

Major junctions
- South end: AR 38 / AR 50
- I-40 / US 70; US 64B in Parkin; US 64 in Parkin; I-555 in Marked Tree
- North end: AR 140 / AR 149 in Marked Tree

Location
- Country: United States
- State: Arkansas
- Counties: Cross, Poinsett, St. Francis

Highway system
- Arkansas Highway System; Interstate; US; State; Business; Spurs; Suffixed; Scenic; Heritage
| ← AR 74 | → AR 76 |

Highway 75 (AR 75 and Hwy. 75) is a north–south state highway in the Arkansas Delta. The route runs from Highway 38/Highway 50 north to AR 14/AR 140/AR 149 in Marked Tree. Created during the initial 1926 Arkansas state highway numbering, Highway 75 has been shortened and extended over roughly the same alignment over its lifetime. The highway has one spur route, Highway 75 Spur in the small town of Parkin. Both highways are maintained by the Arkansas Department of Transportation (ArDOT).

== Route description ==
The ArDOT maintains Highway 75 like all other parts of the state highway system. As a part of these responsibilities, the department tracks the volume of traffic using its roads in surveys using a metric called average annual daily traffic (AADT). ArDOT estimates the traffic level for a segment of roadway for any average day of the year in these surveys. As of 2019, AADT was estimated to below 1,000 vehicles per day (VPD), except for between Smithdale Street and US 64 in Parkin, where it was estimated as 1,200, and in Marked Tree north of I-555, where it ranges between 4,000 and 5,700 VPD. (Note: Marked Tree segment AADT counted as US 63B in 2019, prior to decommissioning.) For reference, the American Association of State Highway and Transportation Officials (AASHTO), classifies roads with fewer than 400 vehicles per day as a very low volume local road.

No segment of Highway 75 has been listed as part of the National Highway System, a network of roads important to the nation's economy, defense, and mobility.

Highway 75 begins at Highway 38/Highway 50 east of Forrest City and runs north to cross the Union Pacific Railway tracks at the unincorporated community of Round Pond. Continuing north, Highway 75 intersects U.S. Highway 70 (US 70) at Hicks Station; the two routes continue east in a concurrency as a frontage road to Interstate 40 (I-40). At I-40 exit 256, Highway 75 turns due north and crosses over I-40 at a diamond interchange and runs into Cross County.

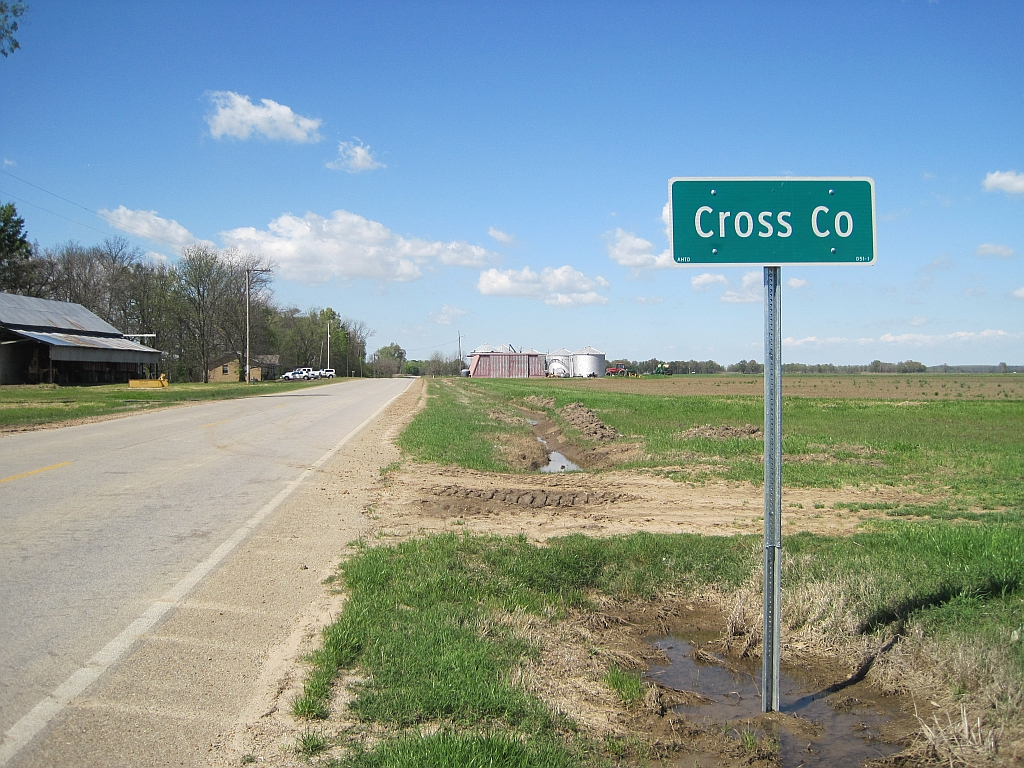
Highway 75 enters Cross County

Highway 75 runs north as a section line road through rural farmland land in eastern Cross County, serving as the eastern terminus of Highway 306 at Gieseck before entering the small town of Parkin. Highway 75 Spur, the only special route of Highway 75, begins in southern Parkin and runs west from the parent route south of downtown. Highway 75 continues northward under a low clearance railroad bridge (12.0 feet (3.7 m) and along the eastern edge of downtown Parkin to Smithdale Street, where it junctions with the northern end of Highway 75S (heading west) and the western end of US Highway 64 Business (US 64B, heading east). A short distance north of this junction, Highway 75 forms a concurrency with US 64 westbound near Parkin Archaeological State Park and Native American burial mounds. Highway 75 turns north and begins roughly paralleling the St. Francis River, intersecting Highway 42 at Coldwater and entering Poinsett County.

Once north of the Singer Forest Natural Area, Highway 75 passes through sectioned farm land and drainage ditches, continuing along the St. Francis River to the small town of Marked Tree. Highway 75 meets I-555/Highway 14 at an interchange. North of this interchange, Highway 75 continues north with Highway 14 into Marked Tree, passing the Marked Tree Commercial Historic District (listed on the National Register of Historic Places) and bridging the St. Francis River. North of the river, Highway 75 terminates at the junction of the northern terminus of Highway 149 and the western terminus of Highway 140 with Highway 14 continuing eastbound along Highway 140.

== History ==
State Road 75 was created during the 1926 Arkansas state highway numbering, running from US 70 to State Road 16 (later replaced by US 64) at Parkin, along State Road 16 to Earle, then north and east to US 61 in Turrell. Per the 1937 map, Highway 75 was re-designated to run northerly from Parkin to Coldwater. The segment from Earle to Turrell was re-designated as extensions of Highway 42 and Highway 149. On December 19, 1940, the designation was extended north to US 63 in Marked Tree by the Arkansas State Highway Commission. On the 1948 map, Highway 75 was extended south along US 70 to Widener along a former alignment of Highway 50 following a Highway 50 extension to Madison.

Highway 75 was again truncated at US 70 on March 11, 1954, with the section to Widener becoming part of Highway 38. On June 23, 1965, Highway 75 was again extended south from US 70 for 4.0 miles (6.4 km) during a period of state highway system expansion, with an extension to the current southern terminus on November 23, 1966.

== Major intersections ==
| County | Location | mi | km | Destinations | Notes |
|---|---|---|---|---|---|
| St. Francis | | 0.000 | 0.000 | AR 38 / AR 50 – Hughes, Widener | Southern terminus |
| St. Francis | Hicks Station | 5.641 | 9.078 | US 70 west – Forrest City | South end of US 70 overlap |
| St. Francis | | 0.000 | 0.000 | US 70 east – West Memphis | North end of US 70 overlap |
| St. Francis | | 0.080 | 0.129 | I-40 – Little Rock, West Memphis, Memphis | I-40 exit 256 |
| Cross | Gieseck | 4.46 | 7.18 | AR 306 west | |
| Cross | Parkin | 10.02 | 16.13 | AR 75S north | |
| Cross | Parkin | 10.58 | 17.03 | AR 75S south / US 64B east (Smithdale Avenue) | |
| Cross | Parkin | 10.952 | 17.626 | US 64 east – Marion, Memphis | South end of US 64 overlap |
| Cross | | 0.000 | 0.000 | US 64 west – Wynne | North end of US 64 overlap |
| Cross | Coldwater | 7.303 | 11.753 | AR 42 – Birdeye, Twist | |
| Poinsett | | | | Holt Road | Former AR 308 |
| Poinsett | Marked Tree | 26.15 | 42.08 | I-555 – Jonesboro, Memphis | I-555 exit 14 |
| Poinsett | Marked Tree | 26.8 | 43.1 | AR 140 east (Frisco Street) / AR 149 south – Memphis | Northern terminus, AR 140 western terminus, AR 149 northern terminus |
1.000 mi = 1.609 km; 1.000 km = 0.621 mi: Concurrency terminus

== Parkin spur route ==
Highway 75S
- Location: Parkin
- Length: 0.860 mi (1,384 m)
- Existed: September 24, 1974–present

Highway 75 Spur (AR 75S and Hwy. 75S) is a spur route in Parkin. Highway 75S serves as the truck route through Parkin, as heavy trucks are not permitted on Highway 75 in town.

Route description

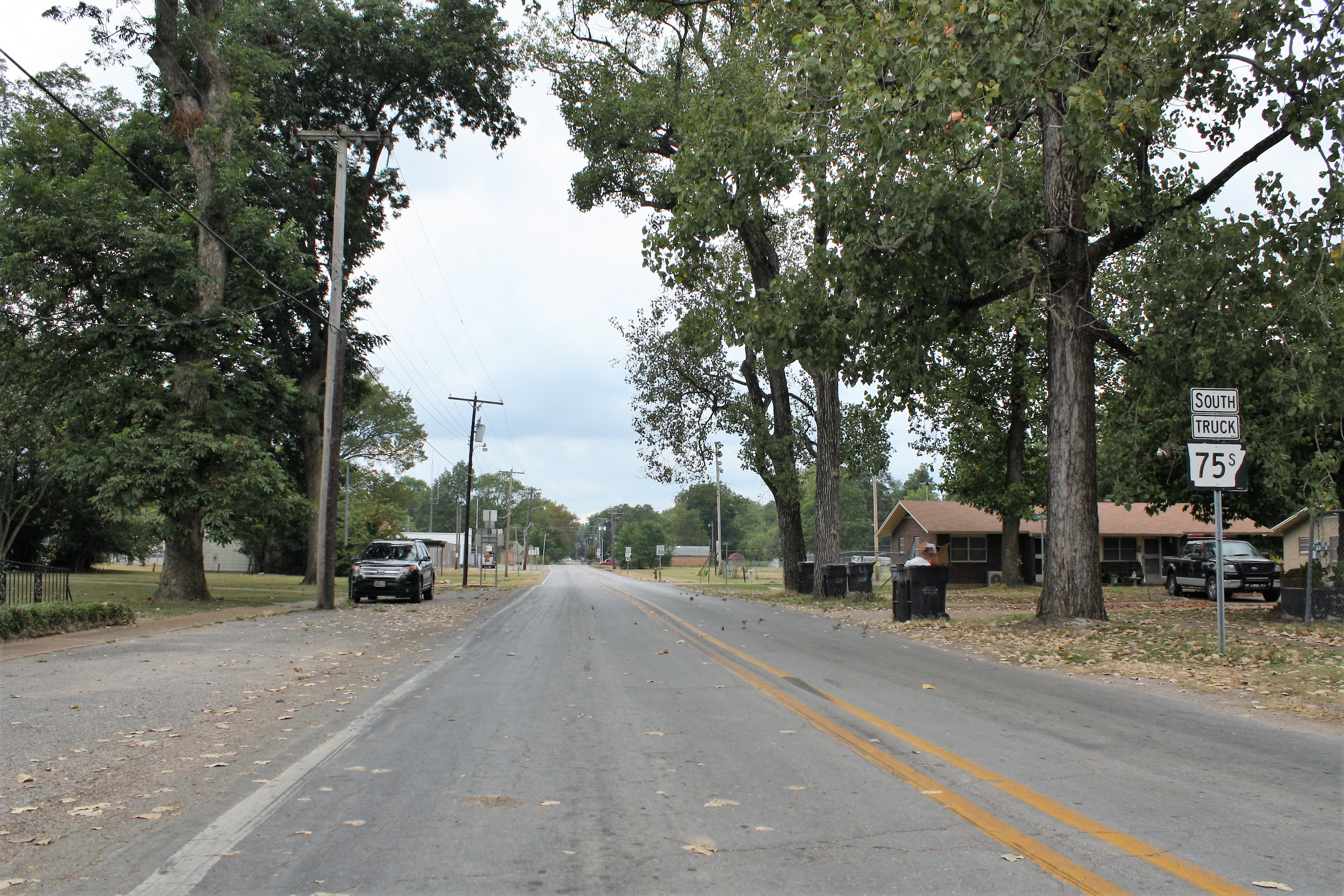
First Highway 75 Spur reassurance marker south of the Highway 75 junction in Parkin

Highway 75S begins at Highway 75 in the southern part of Parkin near the Parkin Water Plant. The highway runs due west before curving north and crossing the Union Pacific Railway tracks. Highway 75B turns right onto Smithdale Street and continues east to Highway 75 (Church Street), where it terminates. Smithdale Street continues eastbound as US 64B.

History

The spur was created by the Arkansas State Highway Commission on September 24, 1974, between the parent route and the railroad tracks to serve an industrial area. On January 29, 1976, the designation was extended south and east along city streets to the current southern terminus.

Major intersections

The entire route is in Parkin, Cross County.

| mi | km | Destinations | Notes |
|---|---|---|---|
| 0.000 | 0.000 | AR 75 | Southern terminus |
| 0.860 | 1.384 | AR 75 (Church Street) / US 64B east (Smithdale Street) | Northern terminus, US 64B western terminus |
1.000 mi = 1.609 km; 1.000 km = 0.621 mi
