= Seyppel, Arkansas =

Seyppel
- Unincorporated community
- Location in Arkansas Seyppel (the United States)
- Coordinates: 34°53′59″N 90°17′49″W
- Country: United States
- State: Arkansas
- County: Crittenden
- Township: Jackson
- Elevation: 210 ft (64 m)
- Time zone: UTC-6 (Central (CST))
  - Summer (DST): UTC-5 (CDT)
- GNIS feature ID: 67827

Seyppel is an unincorporated community in Crittenden County, Arkansas, United States.

Highway 147 passes through Seyppel, and the Mississippi Levee borders the east side of the community. A short distance east of the levee is Seyppel Landing, located directly on the Mississippi River.

== History ==
Isaac Burgett was an early settler and planter. At the time of his death in 1865, Burgett was the oldest citizen in Crittenden County. Otto Seyppel, born in Germany in 1854, took over the plantation. The Seyppel Plantation is today called "Allen Farm".

A post office was established in 1888.

Rogers Cemetery is located north of Seyppel, and Walnut Grove Church and school—historic but still standing—is located west of the community.

James Cotton was known to have performed at a juke joint once located in Seyppel, and blues guitarist Hubert Sumlin accidentally fell through its window one evening while watching Howlin' Wolf perform.
