= Cunningham Corner, Arkansas =

Cunningham Corner
- Unincorporated community
- Cunningham Corner's position in Arkansas. Cunningham Corner (the United States)
- Coordinates: 35°11′30″N 90°17′30″W
- Country: United States
- State: Arkansas
- County: Crittenden
- Township: Jackson
- Elevation: 217 ft (66 m)
- Time zone: UTC-6 (Central (CST))
  - Summer (DST): UTC-5 (CDT)
- Area code: 870
- GNIS feature ID: 67798

Cunningham Corner (formerly Cunningham's Corner) is an unincorporated community in Jackson Township, Crittenden County, Arkansas, United States. It is located at the intersection of Highway 147 and Highway 128 approximately six miles west-northwest of West Memphis.
