= Northern Ohio, Arkansas =

- Unincorporated community
- Location within Arkansas Location within the United States
- Coordinates: 35°30′12″N 90°27′13″W
- Country: United States
- State: Arkansas
- County: Poinsett
- Elevation: 217 ft (66 m)
- Time zone: UTC-6 (Central (CST))
  - Summer (DST): UTC-5 (CDT)
- Area code: 870
- GNIS feature ID: 82819

Northern Ohio is an unincorporated community in Poinsett County, Arkansas, United States. Northern Ohio is located on Arkansas Highway 75, 2.75 miles (4.43 km) southwest of Marked Tree. A resettlement community was founded at Northern Ohio in 1936 on land bought from the Northern Ohio Cooperage Company.
