= Edmondson, Arkansas =

- Town
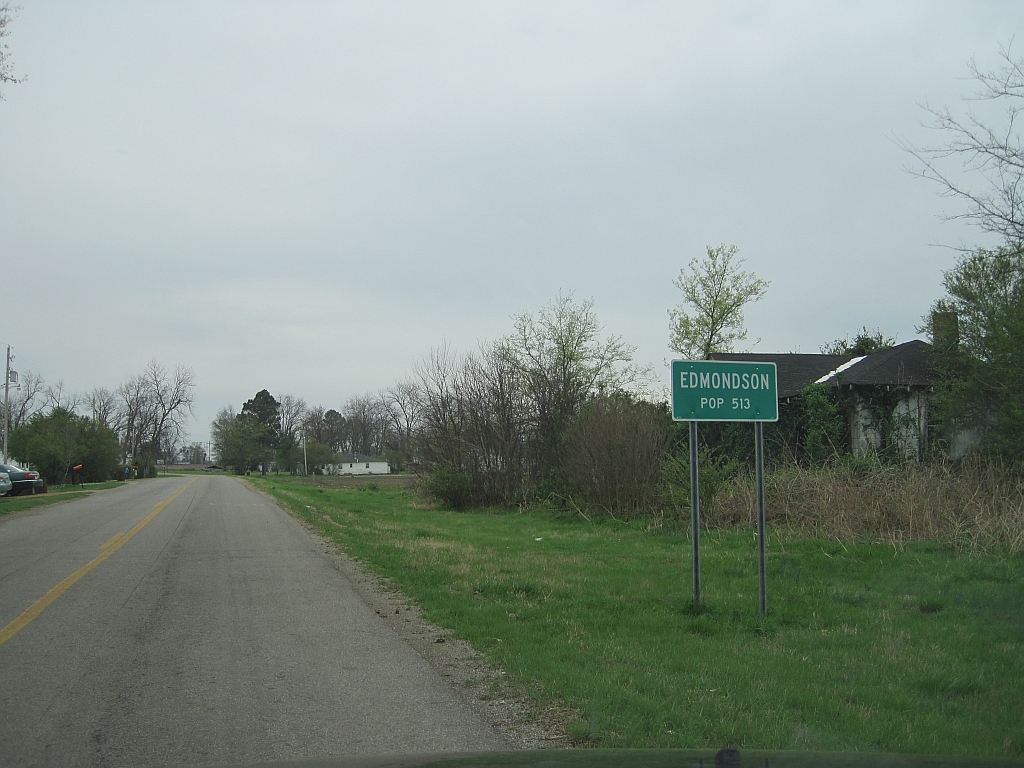

- Location of Edmondson in Crittenden County, Arkansas.
- Coordinates: 35°06′18″N 90°18′20″W
- Country: United States
- State: Arkansas
- County: Crittenden

Area
  - Total: 2.99 sq mi (7.75 km^{2})
  - Land: 2.99 sq mi (7.75 km^{2})
  - Water: 0 sq mi (0.00 km^{2})
- Elevation: 203 ft (62 m)

Population (2020)
  - Total: 243
  - Estimate (2025): 240 ▼
  - Density: 81.2/sq mi (31.36/km^{2})
- Time zone: UTC-6 (Central (CST))
  - Summer (DST): UTC-5 (CDT)
- ZIP code: 72332
- Area code: 870
- FIPS code: 05-20830
- GNIS feature ID: 2406425

Edmondson is a town in Crittenden County, Arkansas, United States. The population was 243 at the 2020 census.

== Geography ==
Edmondson is located in south-central Crittenden County and is 4 miles (6 km) south of Interstate 40, which then leads 6 miles (10 km) east to West Memphis and 14 miles (23 km) east to downtown Memphis, Tennessee.

According to the United States Census Bureau, Edmondson has a total area of 3.2 square miles (8.4 km^{2}), all land.

== Demographics ==
Historical population
Census	Pop.	Note	%±
1910	342		—
1920	325		−5.0%
1930	302		−7.1%
1940	308		2.0%
1950	283		−8.1%
1960	288		1.8%
1970	412		43.1%
1980	344		−16.5%
1990	286		−16.9%
2000	513		79.4%
2010	427		−16.8%
2020	243		−43.1%
2025 (est.)	240	▼	−1.2%
U.S. Decennial Census

=== 2020 Census ===
Edmondson town, Arkansas – Racial and ethnic composition Note: the US Census treats Hispanic/Latino as an ethnic category. This table excludes Latinos from the racial categories and assigns them to a separate category. Hispanics/Latinos may be of any race.
Race / Ethnicity (NH = Non-Hispanic)	Pop 2000	Pop 2010	Pop 2020	% 2000	% 2010	% 2020
White alone (NH)	230	118	66	16.65%	27.63%	27.16%
Black or African American alone (NH)	1,116	281	169	80.81%	65.81%	69.55%
Native American or Alaska Native alone (NH)	3	0	0	0.22%	0.00%	0.00%
Asian alone (NH)	1	2	0	0.07%	0.47%	0.00%
Native Hawaiian or Pacific Islander alone (NH)	0	0	0	0.00%	0.00%	0.00%
Other race alone (NH)	1	0	0	0.07%	0.00%	0.00%
Mixed race or Multiracial (NH)	19	12	7	1.38%	2.81%	2.88%
Hispanic or Latino (any race)	11	14	1	0.80%	3.28%	0.41%
Total	1,381	427	243	100.00%	100.00%	100.00%

As of the census of 2000, there were 513 people, 174 households, and 140 families residing in the town. The population density was 60.9 people/km^{2} (158 people/mi^{2}). There were 198 housing units at an average density of 23.5 units/km^{2} (61 units/mi^{2}). The racial makeup of the town was 27.49% White, 71.15% Black or African American, 0.58% Native American, 0.19% from other races, and 0.58% from two or more races. 0.39% of the population were Hispanic or Latino of any race.

There were 174 households, out of which 42.5% had children under the age of 18 living with them, 47.7% were married couples living together, 26.4% had a female householder with no husband present, and 19.0% were non-families. 15.5% of all households were made up of individuals, and 5.7% had someone living alone who was 65 years of age or older. The average household size was 2.95 and the average family size was 3.29.

In the town, the population was spread out, with 35.9% under the age of 18, 9.0% from 18 to 24, 25.7% from 25 to 44, 18.5% from 45 to 64, and 10.9% who were 65 years of age or older. The median age was 29 years. For every 100 females, there were 98.1 males. For every 100 females age 18 and over, there were 90.2 males.

The median income for a household in the town was $28,056, and the median income for a family was $30,000. Males had a median income of $29,000 versus $17,917 for females. The per capita income for the town was $14,143. About 21.5% of families and 24.6% of the population were below the poverty line, including 31.9% of those under age 18 and 22.2% of those age 65 or over.

== Education ==
Edmondson is served by the West Memphis School District, which operates Academies of West Memphis (formerly West Memphis High School).
