= St. Francis County, Arkansas =

County in Arkansas, United States

- County
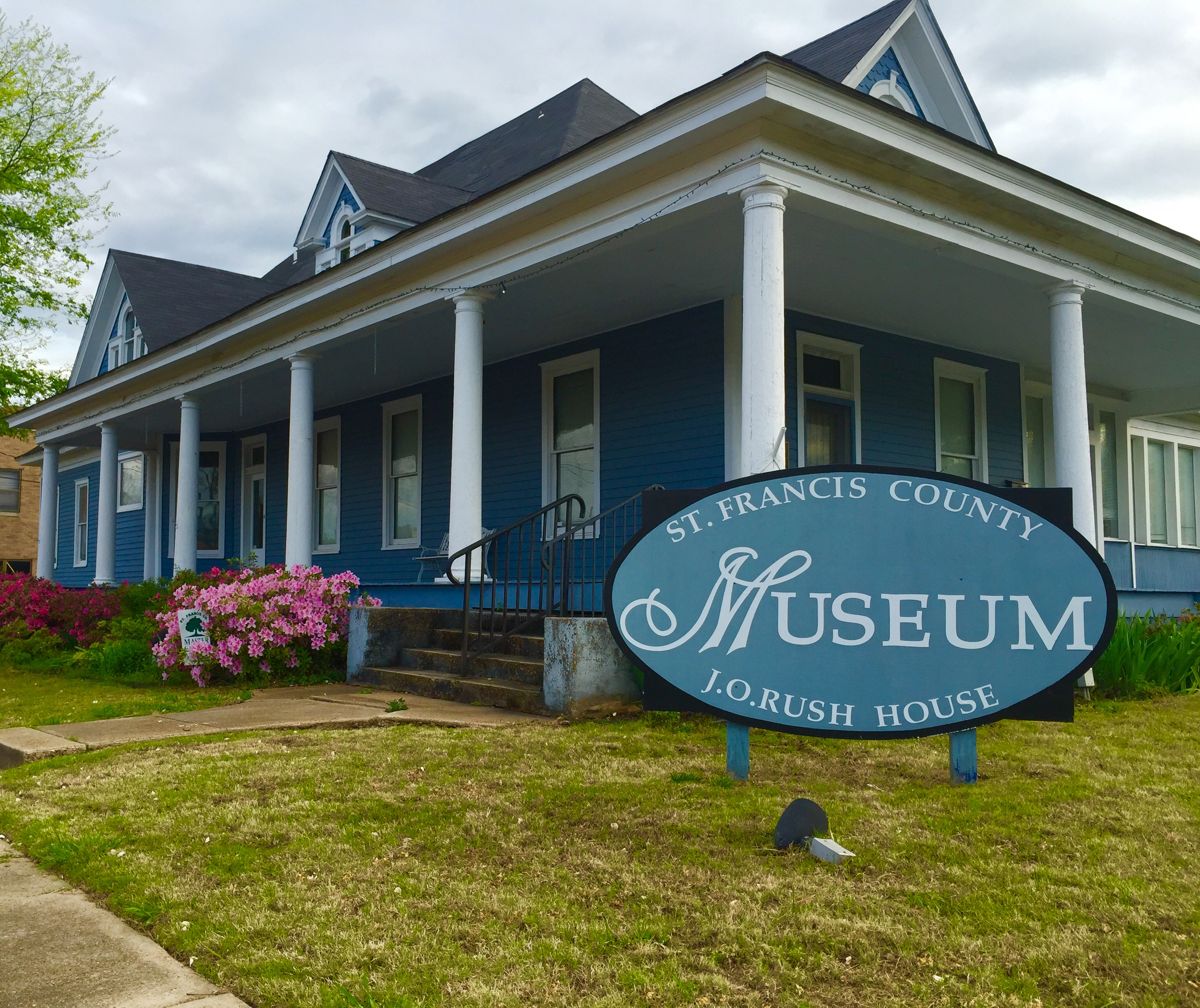
- St. Francis County Museum in Forrest City, Arkansas.

- Location within the U.S. state of Arkansas
- Coordinates: 35°01′36″N 90°42′15″W
- Country: United States
- State: Arkansas
- Founded: October 13, 1827
- Named for: St. Francis River
- Seat: Forrest City
- Largest city: Forrest City

Area
  - Total: 643 sq mi (1,670 km^{2})
  - Land: 635 sq mi (1,640 km^{2})
  - Water: 7.7 sq mi (20 km^{2}) 1.2%

Population (2020)
  - Total: 23,090
  - Estimate (2025): 21,800 ▼
  - Density: 36.4/sq mi (14.0/km^{2})
- Time zone: UTC−6 (Central)
  - Summer (DST): UTC−5 (CDT)
- Congressional district: 1st
- Website: stfranciscountyar.gov

St. Francis County is a county in the U.S. state of Arkansas. As of the 2020 census, the population was 23,090. The county seat is Forrest City.

St. Francis County comprises the Forrest City, Arkansas Micropolitan Statistical Area, which is also included in the Memphis-Forrest City, TN-MS-AR Combined Statistical Area.

== History ==
St. Francis County was formed by the Arkansas territorial legislature on October 13, 1827. Madison served as the county seat until Forrest City, formed in 1869 and named after Nathan Bedford Forrest, replaced it in 1874.

The percentage of tenant farmers in the county rose from 43.2% in 1880 to 70.7% in 1900.

It is on the eastern border of the state in the Arkansas Delta, formed by the lowlands of the Mississippi River. It was an area of large cotton plantations in the antebellum era, when the workers were enslaved African Americans. It continued as an agricultural area into the late 19th century, when many freedmen became sharecroppers.

== Geography ==
According to the U.S. Census Bureau, the county has a total area of 643 square miles (1,670 km^{2}), of which 635 square miles (1,640 km^{2}) is land and 7.7 square miles (20 km^{2}) (1.2%) is water.

=== Major highways ===
- Interstate 40
- U.S. Highway 70
- U.S. Highway 79
- Highway 1
- Highway 38
- Highway 50
- Highway 75
- Highway 78
- Highway 149
- Highway 193
- Highway 259
- Highway 261
- Highway 284
- Highway 306
- Highway 334
- Highway 357
- Highway 980

=== Adjacent counties ===
- Cross County (north)
- Crittenden County (east)
- Lee County (south)
- Monroe County (southwest)
- Woodruff County (northwest)

== Demographics ==
Historical population
Census	Pop.	Note	%±
1830	1,505		—
1840	2,499		66.0%
1850	4,479		79.2%
1860	8,672		93.6%
1870	6,714		−22.6%
1880	8,389		24.9%
1890	13,543		61.4%
1900	17,157		26.7%
1910	22,548		31.4%
1920	28,385		25.9%
1930	33,394		17.6%
1940	36,043		7.9%
1950	36,841		2.2%
1960	33,303		−9.6%
1970	30,799		−7.5%
1980	30,858		0.2%
1990	28,497		−7.7%
2000	29,329		2.9%
2010	28,258		−3.7%
2020	23,090		−18.3%
2025 (est.)	21,800	▼	−5.6%
U.S. Decennial Census; 1790–1960 1900–1990; 1990–2000 2010

=== Racial and ethnic composition ===
St. Francis County, Arkansas – Racial and ethnic composition Note: the US Census treats Hispanic/Latino as an ethnic category. This table excludes Latinos from the racial categories and assigns them to a separate category. Hispanics/Latinos may be of any race.
Race / Ethnicity (NH = Non-Hispanic)	Pop 1980	Pop 1990	Pop 2000	Pop 2010	Pop 2020	% 1980	% 1990	% 2000	% 2010	% 2020
White alone (NH)	16,281	14,651	13,224	11,973	9,206	52.76%	51.41%	45.09%	42.37%	39.87%
Black or African American alone (NH)	14,014	13,480	14,273	14,565	12,501	45.41%	47.30%	48.67%	51.54%	54.14%
Native American or Alaska Native alone (NH)	36	47	64	127	65	0.12%	0.16%	0.22%	0.45%	0.28%
Asian alone (NH)	149	111	161	133	122	0.48%	0.39%	0.55%	0.47%	0.53%
Native Hawaiian or Pacific Islander alone (NH)	x	x	2	9	0	x	x	0.01%	0.03%	0.00%
Other race alone (NH)	6	6	4	9	35	0.02%	0.02%	0.01%	0.03%	0.15%
Mixed race or Multiracial (NH)	x	x	170	293	475	x	x	0.58%	1.04%	2.06%
Hispanic or Latino (any race)	372	202	1,431	1,149	686	1.21%	0.71%	4.88%	4.07%	2.97%
Total	30,858	28,497	29,329	28,258	23,090	100.00%	100.00%	100.00%	100.00%	100.00%

=== 2020 census ===
St. Francis County racial composition (2020)
Race	Percent
White	41.4%
Black or African American	54.4%
American Indian and Alaska Native	0.3%
Asian	0.6%
Native Hawaiian and other Pacific Islander	<0.1%
Some other race	0.8%
Two or more races	2.6%

As of the 2020 census, the county had a population of 23,090. The median age was 42.2 years. 20.3% of residents were under the age of 18 and 17.7% of residents were 65 years of age or older. For every 100 females there were 116.3 males, and for every 100 females age 18 and over there were 122.1 males age 18 and over.

37.1% of residents lived in urban areas, while 62.9% lived in rural areas.

There were 8,470 households in the county, of which 28.6% had children under the age of 18 living in them. Of all households, 34.9% were married-couple households, 20.1% were households with a male householder and no spouse or partner present, and 39.7% were households with a female householder and no spouse or partner present. About 32.7% of all households were made up of individuals and 14.0% had someone living alone who was 65 years of age or older.

There were 9,565 housing units, of which 11.4% were vacant. Among occupied housing units, 56.0% were owner-occupied and 44.0% were renter-occupied. The homeowner vacancy rate was 1.6% and the rental vacancy rate was 7.2%.

=== 2010 census ===
As of the 2010 census, there were 28,258 people living in the county. 51.9% were Black or African American, 44.2% White, 0.5% Native American, 0.5% Asian, 1.4% of some other race and 1.5% of two or more races. 4.1% were Hispanic or Latino (of any race).

=== 2000 census ===
As of the 2000 census, there were 29,329 people, 10,043 households, and 7,230 families living in the county. The population density was 18/km^{2} (47/mi^{2}). There were 11,242 housing units at an average density of 7/km^{2} (18/mi^{2}). The racial makeup of the county was 48.36% White, 49.01% Black or African American, 0.25% Native American, 0.56% Asian, 0.02% Pacific Islander, 0.40% from other races, and 1.40% from two or more races. 4.88% of the population were Hispanic or Latino of any race.

There were 10,043 households, out of which 35.30% had children under the age of 18 living with them, 46.90% were married couples living together, 20.80% had a female householder with no husband present, and 28.00% were non-families. 25.10% of all households were made up of individuals, and 10.80% had someone living alone who was 65 years of age or older. The average household size was 2.65 and the average family size was 3.17.

In the county, the population was spread out, with 27.90% under the age of 18, 9.90% from 18 to 24, 29.10% from 25 to 44, 21.20% from 45 to 64, and 11.90% who were 65 years of age or older. The median age was 34 years. For every 100 females there were 105.60 males. For every 100 females age 18 and over, there were 105.40 males.

The median income for a household in the county was $26,146, and the median income for a family was $30,324. Males had a median income of $28,389 versus $20,578 for females. The per capita income for the county was $12,483. About 23.10% of families and 27.50% of the population were below the poverty line, including 38.70% of those under age 18 and 23.10% of those age 65 or over.

== Government and politics ==
=== Government ===
The county government is a constitutional body granted specific powers by the Constitution of Arkansas and the Arkansas Code. The quorum court is the legislative branch of the county government and controls all spending and revenue collection. Representatives are called justices of the peace and are elected from county districts every even-numbered year. The number of districts in a county vary from nine to fifteen, and district boundaries are drawn by the county election commission. The St. Francis County Quorum Court has eleven members. Presiding over quorum court meetings is the county judge, who serves as the chief executive officer of the county. The county judge is elected at-large and does not vote in quorum court business, although capable of vetoing quorum court decisions.

St. Francis County, Arkansas Elected countywide officials
Position	Officeholder	Party
County Judge	Craig Jones	Democratic
County Clerk	Brandi H. McCoy	Democratic
Circuit Clerk	Alan T. Smith	Democratic
Sheriff/Collector	Bobby May	Independent
Treasurer	Tammy Talley	Independent
Assessor	Ginadell Adams	Independent
Coroner	Miles Kimble	Democratic

The composition of the Quorum Court after the 2024 elections is 7 Democrats, 3 Republicans, and 1 Independent. Justices of the Peace (members) of the Quorum Court following the elections are:

- District 1: Charles Jones (D)
- District 2: Jimmy Long (I)
- District 3: Margarette Lacy Winfrey (D)
- District 4: David Coleman (R)
- District 5: Ernestine Weaver (D)
- District 6: Greg Gray (R)
- District 7: Nathaniel Murray (D)
- District 8: Christopher Ray (D)
- District 9: Maceo J. Hawkins (D)
- District 10: Kendall Owens (D)
- District 11: Jamie Busby (R)

Additionally, the townships of St. Francis County are entitled to elect their own respective constables, as set forth by the Constitution of Arkansas. Constables are largely of historical significance as they were used to keep the peace in rural areas when travel was more difficult. The township constables as of the 2024 elections are:

- Blackfish: Joe W. Cox (D)
- Franks: Harry Mathes Jr. (D)
- Garland: Joe Askue (D)
- Johnson: Kendall Pettus (R)
- Madison: George L. Cochran Sr. (D)
- Prairie: James Roberts (D)
- Telico: Everett Woods (R)

=== Politics ===
The Republican Party and Union Labor Party merged for the 1888 election and nominated a multiracial slate of candidates against the all-white Democratic slate. On September 4, Paul M. Cobbs, a white Democrat, shot at men guarding the precinct ballot box and wounded seven. The Republican-Union Labor ticket won the county elections. The Union Labor Party's gubernatorial and Arkansas's 1st congressional district candidates also won St. Francis County.

The Federal Bureau of Prisons Federal Correctional Complex, Forrest City is in Forrest City.

A portion of St. Francis County is represented in the Arkansas Senate by Republican Ronald R. Caldwell.

In presidential elections, St. Francis County generally votes Democratic. Following Reconstruction and disenfranchisement of black voters at the turn of the century, the county voted Democratic in every election since 1896, other than 1900 (William McKinley), 1908 (William Howard Taft), and 1968 (George Wallace).

By the late 1960s, white conservatives began to shift into the Republican Party, and St. Francis County was carried by Richard Nixon in 1972 amidst a national landslide. In 1984, Ronald Reagan carried the county in his landslide reelection. The county has voted Democratic in every subsequent presidential election, albeit be narrowing margins in recent years. In 2024, Kamala Harris narrowly won the county by 44 votes.

United States presidential election results for St. Francis County, Arkansas
Year	Republican		Democratic		Third party(ies)	
Year	No.	%	No.	%	No.	%
1896	455	29.35%	1,087	70.13%	8	0.52%
1900	703	51.84%	634	46.76%	19	1.40%
1904	577	43.29%	737	55.29%	19	1.43%
1908	755	51.12%	619	41.91%	103	6.97%
1912	296	29.19%	563	55.52%	155	15.29%
1916	395	29.15%	960	70.85%	0	0.00%
1920	903	40.82%	1,252	56.60%	57	2.58%
1924	433	29.52%	972	66.26%	62	4.23%
1928	617	30.82%	1,376	68.73%	9	0.45%
1932	130	5.49%	2,191	92.56%	46	1.94%
1936	94	4.59%	1,938	94.72%	14	0.68%
1940	192	10.14%	1,671	88.23%	31	1.64%
1944	446	21.16%	1,654	78.46%	8	0.38%
1948	178	8.26%	1,011	46.91%	966	44.83%
1952	1,792	42.08%	2,466	57.90%	1	0.02%
1956	1,884	44.87%	2,114	50.35%	201	4.79%
1960	1,786	39.53%	2,432	53.83%	300	6.64%
1964	3,377	47.98%	3,651	51.88%	10	0.14%
1968	1,608	17.58%	3,284	35.91%	4,254	46.51%
1972	5,692	65.95%	2,674	30.98%	265	3.07%
1976	3,639	34.59%	6,851	65.12%	30	0.29%
1980	4,485	42.77%	5,816	55.46%	186	1.77%
1984	5,378	52.10%	4,866	47.14%	78	0.76%
1988	4,298	47.86%	4,656	51.85%	26	0.29%
1992	3,289	30.93%	6,548	61.57%	798	7.50%
1996	2,523	29.19%	5,562	64.35%	559	6.47%
2000	3,414	40.18%	4,986	58.69%	96	1.13%
2004	3,815	39.79%	5,684	59.28%	89	0.93%
2008	3,917	41.21%	5,486	57.72%	102	1.07%
2012	3,368	40.28%	4,910	58.72%	84	1.00%
2016	3,195	43.00%	4,031	54.25%	204	2.75%
2020	3,242	45.61%	3,604	50.70%	262	3.69%
2024	2,909	48.65%	2,953	49.39%	117	1.96%

== Communities ==
=== Cities ===
- Forrest City (county seat)
- Madison

=== Towns ===
- Caldwell
- Colt
- Heth
- Hughes
- Palestine
- Wheatley
- Widener

=== Census-designated place ===
- Goodwin

=== Townships ===
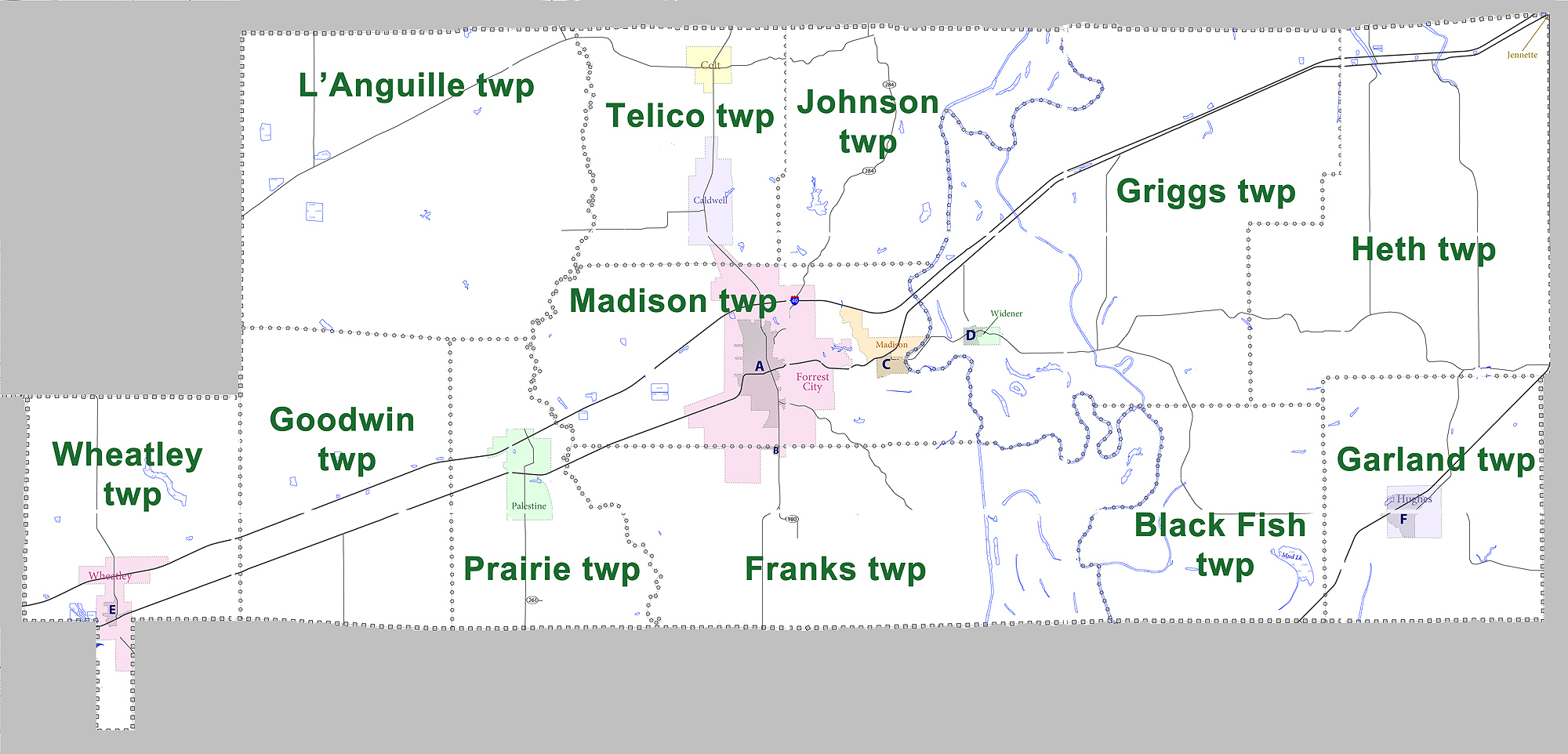
Townships in St. Francis County, Arkansas as of 2010

Townships in Arkansas are the divisions of a county. Each township includes unincorporated areas; some may have incorporated cities or towns within part of their boundaries. Arkansas townships have limited purposes in modern times. However, the United States census does list Arkansas population based on townships (sometimes referred to as "county subdivisions" or "minor civil divisions"). Townships are also of value for historical purposes in terms of genealogical research. Each town or city is within one or more townships in an Arkansas county based on census maps and publications. The townships of St. Francis County are listed below; listed in parentheses are the cities, towns, and/or census-designated places that are fully or partially inside the township.

- Black Fish
- Franks (small part of Forrest City)
- Garland (Hughes)
- Goodwin
- Griggs (Widener)
- Heth
- Johnson
- L'Anguille
- Madison (most of Forrest City, Madison)
- Prairie (Palestine)
- Telico (Caldwell, Colt, small part of Forrest City)
- Wheatley (most of Wheatley)

== Education ==
School districts include:

- Forrest City School District
- Palestine-Wheatley School District
- West Memphis School District

Former school districts:

- Hughes School District

== Notable people ==
- Al Green, soul singer
- Charlie Rich, country singer
- Sonny Liston, world heavyweight boxing champion
- Mark R. Martin, Secretary of State of Arkansas

== See also ==
- List of lakes in St. Francis County, Arkansas
- National Register of Historic Places listings in St. Francis County, Arkansas

== Works cited ==
- Hild, Matthew (2004). "Labor, Third-Party Politics, and New South Democracy in Arkansas, 1884-1896". The Arkansas Historical Quarterly. 63 (1). Arkansas Historical Association: 24–43. JSTOR 40019008.
- Welch, Melanie (2001). "Violence and the Decline of Black Politics in St. Francis County". The Arkansas Historical Quarterly. 60 (4). Arkansas Historical Association: 360–93. doi:10.2307/40038253. JSTOR 40038253.
