= List of U.S. Highways in Arkansas =

United States Numbered Highways of the Arkansas Highway System
- Highway markers for US 71, US 371 and US 49B

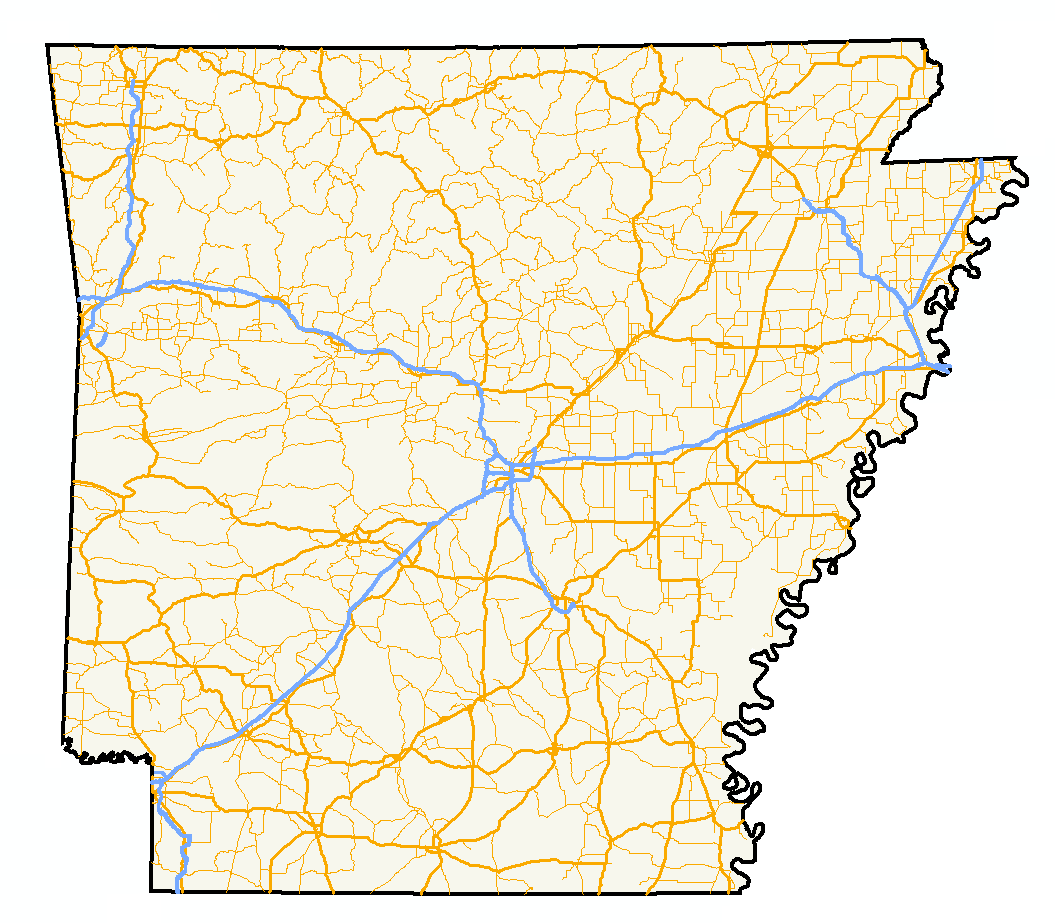
- A map of highways in the state of Arkansas. Note: Blue highlighted lines represent Interstate Highways, not United States Numbered Highways

System information
- Formed: 1926

Highway names
- US Highways: US Highway nn, US Route nn (US nn)

System links
- Arkansas Highway System; Interstate; US; State; Business; Spurs; Suffixed; Scenic; Heritage

The U.S. Highways in Arkansas are the U.S. Routes maintained by the U.S. state of Arkansas. There are 21 such highways.

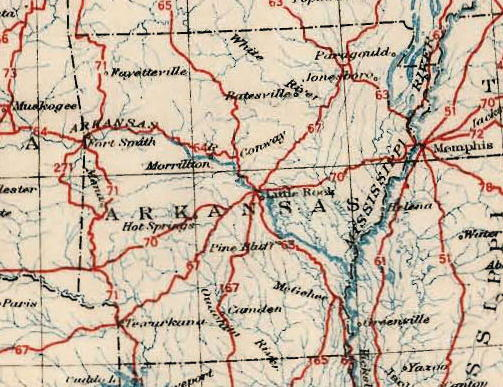
1926 map of the U.S. Highways in Arkansas

== Mainline highways ==
Number	Length (mi)	Length (km)	Southern or western terminus	Northern or eastern terminus	Formed	Removed	Notes
US 49	182.33	293.43	US 49 at Mississippi state line near Helena	US 62/ AR 1 at Piggott	1963	current	
US 59	112	180	I-30 at Texarkana	US 59 at Oklahoma state line west of Acorn	1934	current	
US 61	75.3	121.2	US 61 at Tennessee state line near West Memphis	US 61 at Missouri state line near Blytheville	1926	current	
US 62	329.9	530.9	US 62 at Oklahoma state line	US 62 at Missouri state line near St. Francis	1930	current	
US 63	340	550	US 63/US 167 at the Louisiana state line in Junction City	US 63 at Missouri state line near Mammoth Spring	1926	current	
US 64	246.35	396.46	US 64 at Oklahoma state line near Fort Smith	US 64 at Tennessee state line near Memphis, TN	1926	current	
US 65	309	497	US 65 at Louisiana state line south of Eudora	US 65 at Missouri state line north of Burlington	1926	current	
US 67	325	523	US 67 at Texas state line at Texarkana	US 67 at Missouri state line	1926	current	
US 70	286	460	US 70 at Oklahoma state line near DeQueen	US 70 at Tennessee state line	1926	current	
US 71	310	500	US 71 at Louisiana state line	US 71 at Missouri state line	1926	current	
US 78	140.75	226.52	I-57/US 67 near Cash	US 78 at Tennessee state line near West Memphis	2023	current	
US 79	272	438	US 79 at Louisiana state line	US 79 at Tennessee state line near West Memphis	1935	current	
US 82	190.71	306.92	US 82 at Texas state line at Texarkana	US 82 at Mississippi state line near Greenville, MS	1931	current	
US 165	183	295	US 165 at Louisiana state line	US 70 at North Little Rock	1926	current	
US 167	258.954	416.746	US 167 at Louisiana state line	US 62/US 412 in Ash Flat	1926	current	
US 270	162.6	261.7	US 270 at Oklahoma state line	I-530/US 65 at White Hall	1930	current	
US 271	3	4.8	US 271 at Oklahoma state line near Fort Smith	US 71B, Ft. Smith	1926	current	
US 278	259.2	417.1	US 59/US 71 at Wickes	US 278 at Mississippi state line	1998	current	
US 371	134	216	US 371 at Louisiana state line	US 59/US 70/US 71/ AR 41 at De Queen	1994	current	
US 412	290	470	US 412 at Oklahoma state line near Siloam Springs	US 412 at Missouri state line	1982	current	
US 425	91	146	US 425 at Louisiana state line	I-530/US 63/US 65/US 79 at Pine Bluff	1989	current	

== Suffixed and special routes ==
U.S. Highways in Arkansas sometimes have spur or business routes. The signs feature a "B" if designating a business route.

Number	Length (mi)	Length (km)	Southern or western terminus	Northern or eastern terminus	Formed	Removed	Notes
US 49B	3.66	5.89	US 49 in Brookland	US 49 in Brookland	2000	current	
US 49B	6.92	11.14	US 49 in Helena-West Helena	US 49 in Helena-West Helena	1970	current	
US 49B	5.2	8.4	US 49/US 63 in Jonesboro	US 49/AR 1 in Jonesboro	1979	1996	
US 49B	2.36	3.80	US 49/AR 1 in Paragould	US 49/AR 1/US 412/Crowley's Ridge Parkway in Paragould	1979	current	
US 49Y	0.70	1.13	US 412B in Paragould	US 49B in Paragould	—	—	
US 62B	0.739	1.189	Prairie Grove Battlefield State Park	US 62 in Prairie Grove	2014	current	
US 62B	6	9.7	US 62/US 71 in Fayetteville	US 62/US 71 in Fayetteville	1970	1984	
US 62B	2.0	3.2	US 62/AR 94 in Rogers	US 71B/AR 94 in Rogers	1980	2010	Partially renumbered AR 12
US 62B	3.0	4.8	US 62 in Eureka Springs	US 62/AR 23 in Eureka Springs	c. 1970	1990	Former US 62C
US 62B	0.442	0.711	US 62/US 412 in Yellville	US 62/US 412/AR 14 in Yellville	c. 1980	current	
US 62B	2.959	4.762	US 62/US 412	US 62/US 412 in Cotter	1989	current	
US 62B	4.647	7.479	US 62/US 412 in Mountain Home	US 62/US 412 in Mountain Home	1998	current	
US 62B	—	—	US 62/US 412 in Salem	US 62/US 412 in Salem	1958	current	
US 62C	3.0	4.8	US 62 in Eureka Springs	US 62/AR 23 in Eureka Springs	c. 1935	c. 1970	Renamed US 62B
US 62S	0.671	1.080	US 62 in Berryville	A. L. Carter Street/Oak View Drive in Berryville	1975	current	
US 62S	0.700	1.127	US 62/US 412 in Pyatt	Marion CR 321	—	—	
US 63B	0.838	1.349	US 63/AR 160 in Hermitage	US 63 in Hermitage	2000	current	Former US 63
US 63B	2.699	4.344	US 63/AR 8 in Warren	US 63/AR 189 in Warren	1999	current	Former AR 15B
US 63B	7.30	11.75	I-530/US 63/US 79 in Pine Bluff	US 63/US 79/US 65B/AR 15 in Pine Bluff	1999	2020	Partially redesignated AR 463
US 63S	0.8	1.3	US 63	US 70	1999	2008	Former AR 11S
US 63B	2.4	3.9	I-555/US 63/AR 149 in Marked Tree	I-555/US 63/AR 14/AR 75 in Marked Tree	1970	2019	Former US 63
US 63C	1.7	2.7	US 63 in Trumann	US 63/AR 69 in Trumann	1959	1970	
US 63C	1.4	2.3	US 63 in Jonesboro	AR 1 in Jonesboro	1961	1970	Renumbered US 63B
US 63B	—	—	—	—	1970	2006	Former US 63C, redesignated AR 91
US 63B	2.735	4.402	US 63 in Bono	US 63 in Bono	2014	current	Former US 63
US 63B	4.26	6.86	US 63 in Walnut Ridge	US 63	1998	current	Former US 63
US 63B	1.517	2.441	US 62/US 63/US 412 in Hardy	US 62/US 63/US 412 in Hardy	2014	current	Former US 63
US 64B	—	—	—	—	—	—	
US 64C	—	—	—	—	—	—	
US 64B	—	—	—	—	—	—	
US 64B	—	—	—	—	—	—	
US 64B	—	—	—	—	—	—	
US 65S	—	—	—	—	—	—	
US 65B	—	—	—	—	—	—	
US 65B	—	—	—	—	—	—	
US 65B	—	—	—	—	—	—	
US 65B	—	—	—	—	—	—	
US 65B	—	—	—	—	—	—	
US 67B	—	—	—	—	—	—	
US 67B	—	—	—	—	—	—	
US 67B	—	—	—	—	—	—	
US 67B	—	—	—	—	—	—	
US 67B	—	—	—	—	—	—	
US 67B	—	—	—	—	—	—	
US 70B	—	—	—	—	—	—	
US 70B	—	—	—	—	—	—	
US 70B	—	—	—	—	—	—	
US 70B	—	—	—	—	—	—	
US 71B	—	—	—	—	—	—	
US 71B	—	—	—	—	—	—	
US 71B	—	—	—	—	—	—	
US 71B	—	—	—	—	—	—	
US 82B	1.65	2.66	US 371 in Magnolia	US 79/US 82 in Magnolia	1973	2019	
US 82B	5.425	8.731	US 82 in El Dorado	US 82	1982	current	
US 82B	2.088	3.360	US 82	US 82	2018	current	
US 82S	0.128	0.206	US 82	Port of Crossett	—	—	
US 82T	1.3	2.1	US 82 in Stamps	US 82/AR 53 in Stamps	—	2006	
US 165B	1.28	2.06	US 165/AR 1 in Gillett	US 165/AR 1 in Gillett	1982	current	
US 167B	—	—	—	—	1971	current	
US 167B	1.67	2.69	—	—	1968	current	
US 167B	—	—	—	—	2013	current	
US 270B	—	—	—	—	—	—	
US 270B	—	—	—	—	—	—	
US 278B	1.15	1.85	US 278 in Hope	US 67 in Hope	1990	current	
US 278B	1.88	3.03	US 278 in Camden	US 79B in Camden	1998	current	
US 278B	3.99	6.42	US 278 in Warren	US 278 in Warren	1998	current	Former AR 4B
US 278 Byp.	8.5	13.7	US 278	US 425	1998	current	Part of Future I-69
US 412B	2.65	4.26	US 412	US 412/AR 45	2009	current	
US 412B	5.48	8.82	US 412	US 412 in Huntsville	1999	current	
US 412B	15.6	25.1	US 412 in Tontitown	US 412 in Blue Springs Village	proposed	—	
Former; Proposed and unbuilt
