= Hughes, Arkansas =

- Town
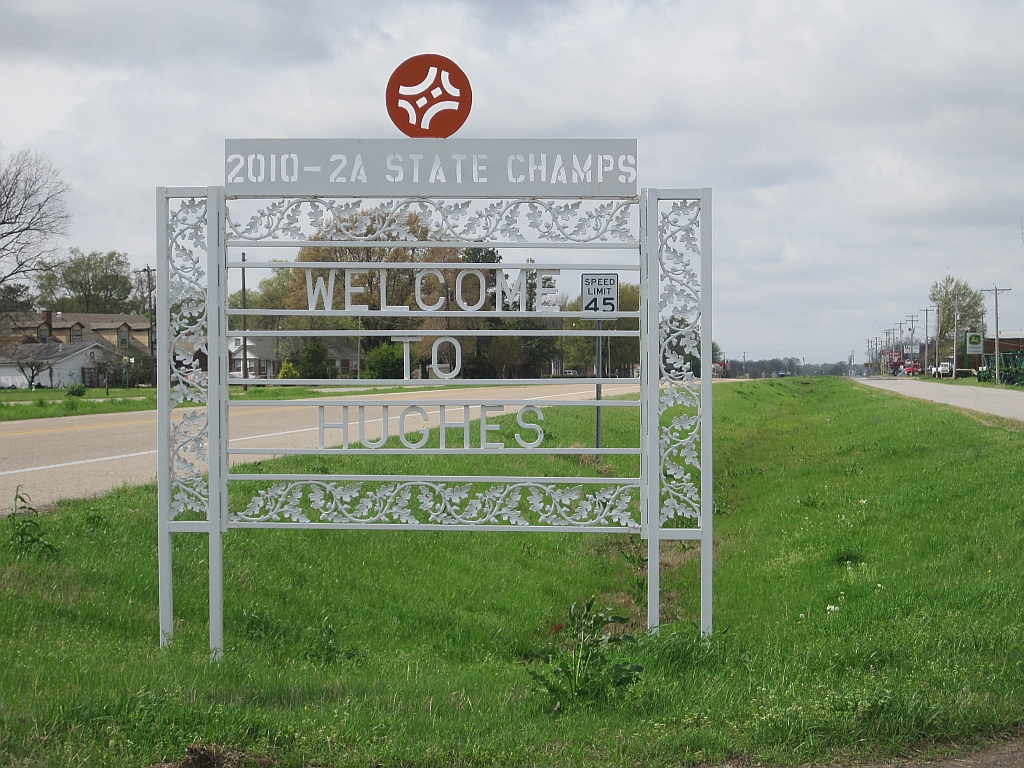

- Location of Hughes in St. Francis County, Arkansas.
- Coordinates: 34°56′54″N 90°28′14″W
- Country: United States
- State: Arkansas
- County: St. Francis

Area
  - Total: 2.29 sq mi (5.92 km^{2})
  - Land: 2.26 sq mi (5.86 km^{2})
  - Water: 0.023 sq mi (0.06 km^{2})
- Elevation: 207 ft (63 m)

Population (2020)
  - Total: 1,056
  - Estimate (2025): 976 ▼
  - Density: 466.6/sq mi (180.16/km^{2})
- Time zone: UTC-6 (Central (CST))
  - Summer (DST): UTC-5 (CDT)
- FIPS code: 05-33760
- GNIS feature ID: 2404739

Hughes is a city in St. Francis County, Arkansas, United States. As of the 2020 census, it had a population of 1,056.

== Geography ==
According to the United States Census Bureau, the town has a total area of 2.2 square miles (5.7 km^{2}), of which 2.2 square miles (5.7 km^{2}) is land and 0.04 square miles (0.10 km^{2}) (0.92%) is water.

It is about 37 miles (60 km) from Memphis, Tennessee.

== Demographics ==
Historical population
Census	Pop.	Note	%±
1920	451		—
1930	815		80.7%
1940	1,004		23.2%
1950	1,686		67.9%
1960	1,960		16.3%
1970	1,872		−4.5%
1980	1,919		2.5%
1990	1,810		−5.7%
2000	1,867		3.1%
2010	1,441		−22.8%
2020	1,056		−26.7%
2025 (est.)	976	▼	−7.6%
U.S. Decennial Census; 2010 2020

=== Racial and ethnic composition ===
Hughes city, Arkansas – Racial and ethnic composition Note: the US Census treats Hispanic/Latino as an ethnic category. This table excludes Latinos from the racial categories and assigns them to a separate category. Hispanics/Latinos may be of any race.
Race / Ethnicity (NH = Non-Hispanic)	Pop 2010	Pop 2020	% 2010	% 2020
White alone (NH)	337	201	23.39%	19.03%
Black or African American alone (NH)	1,069	810	74.18%	76.70%
Native American or Alaska Native alone (NH)	3	3	0.21%	0.28%
Asian alone (NH)	8	0	0.56%	0.00%
Pacific Islander alone (NH)	0	0	0.00%	0.00%
Other race alone (NH)	0	1	0.00%	0.09%
Mixed race or Multiracial (NH)	8	28	0.56%	2.65%
Hispanic or Latino (any race)	16	13	1.11%	1.23%
Total	1,441	1,056	100.00%	100.00%

=== 2020 census ===
As of the 2020 census, Hughes had a population of 1,056. The median age was 38.9 years. 25.9% of residents were under the age of 18 and 16.0% were 65 years of age or older. For every 100 females, there were 86.6 males, and for every 100 females age 18 and over there were 82.5 males.

0.0% of residents lived in urban areas, while 100.0% lived in rural areas.

There were 467 households in Hughes, of which 31.3% had children under the age of 18 living in them. Of all households, 24.4% were married-couple households, 24.8% were households with a male householder and no spouse or partner present, and 42.4% were households with a female householder and no spouse or partner present. About 37.5% of all households were made up of individuals, and 12.8% had someone living alone who was 65 years of age or older.

There were 533 housing units, of which 12.4% were vacant. The homeowner vacancy rate was 1.5% and the rental vacancy rate was 8.1%.

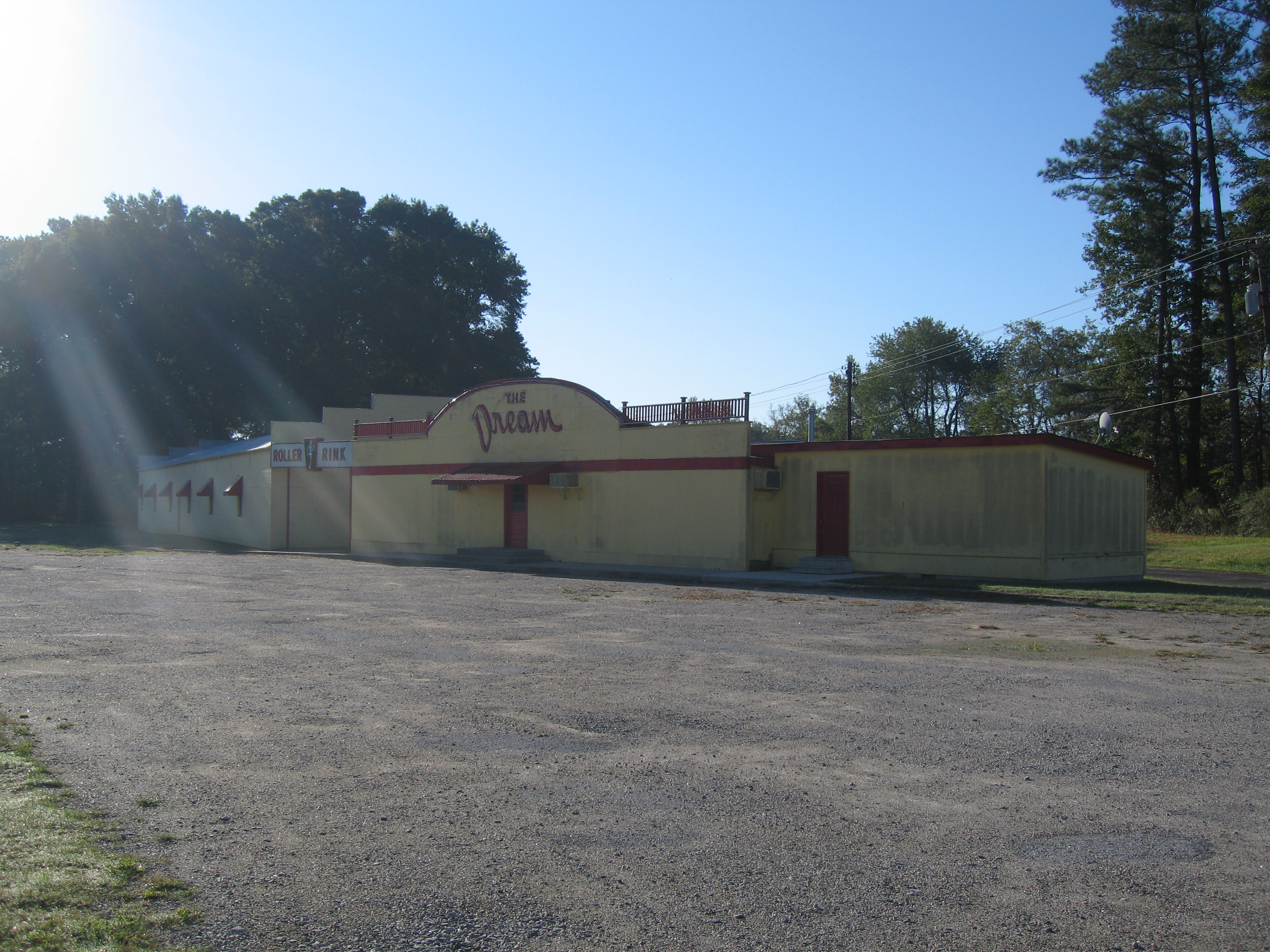
Dream Roller Rink, now abandoned, in Wattsville in 2008

=== 2000 census ===
As of the census of 2000, there were 1,867 people, 682 households, and 493 families residing in the town. The population density was 869.8 inhabitants per square mile (335.8/km^{2}). There were 762 housing units at an average density of 355.0 per square mile (137.1/km^{2}). The racial makeup of the city was 29.41% White, 67.76% Black or African American, 0.11% Native American, 1.61% Asian, 0.11% Pacific Islander, 0.43% from other races, and 0.59% from two or more races. 0.70% of the population were Hispanic or Latino of any race.

There were 682 households, out of which 37.1% had children under the age of 18 living with them, 38.1% were married couples living together, 29.5% had a female householder with no husband present, and 27.6% were non-families. 25.5% of all households were made up of individuals, and 10.7% had someone living alone who was 65 years of age or older. The average household size was 2.74 and the average family size was 3.31.

In the town, the population was spread out, with 33.7% under the age of 18, 9.1% from 18 to 24, 25.5% from 25 to 44, 19.4% from 45 to 64, and 12.2% who were 65 years of age or older. The median age was 31 years. For every 100 females, there were 83.4 males. For every 100 females age 18 and over, there were 73.5 males.

The median income for a household in the town was $18,333, and the median income for a family was $22,976. Males had a median income of $25,417 versus $16,641 for females. The per capita income for the city was $10,039. About 31.7% of families and 38.0% of the population were below the poverty line, including 53.3% of those under age 18 and 31.5% of those age 65 or over.

== Education ==
The community is served by the West Memphis School District. Post-2015 most students were transferred to Faulk Elementary School, West Junior High School, and Academies of West Memphis (formerly West Memphis High School).

Typically school bus commute times from Hughes to West Memphis are about one hour each way due to the bus making multiple stops; without stops the commute would take about thirty minutes. In winter periods Hughes students depart from school and/or arrive from home when the sun is not out.

It was formerly served by the Hughes School District, which operated Mildred Jackson Elementary School and Hughes High School. In 2015 the Arkansas Board of Education voted to consolidate the Hughes district into the West Memphis district because of a decline in enrollment in the Hughes district. The West Memphis district took possession of the school buildings, then gave them to the Hughes municipal government in 2016.

== Economy ==
Hughes School District, in its existence, employed the largest number of people in Hughes prior to its 2015 closure. Former Hughes board member Lincoln Barnett stated that several area businesses, as a result of the district closure, encountered financial problems.

== Recreation ==
After 2016 the municipal government, at no charge, leased the Hughes school gymnasium to Deon Lee, an alumnus of Hughes High and the chief of police, who spent $3,000 to revamp the building to make into an after school center for children.

== Notable people ==
- Lincoln Barnett, city mayor
- Mark R. Martin, Secretary of State of Arkansas 2011–2019, graduated from Hughes High School in 1986.
