= List of state highways in Arkansas =

- Highway markers for some of the longest Arkansas state routes

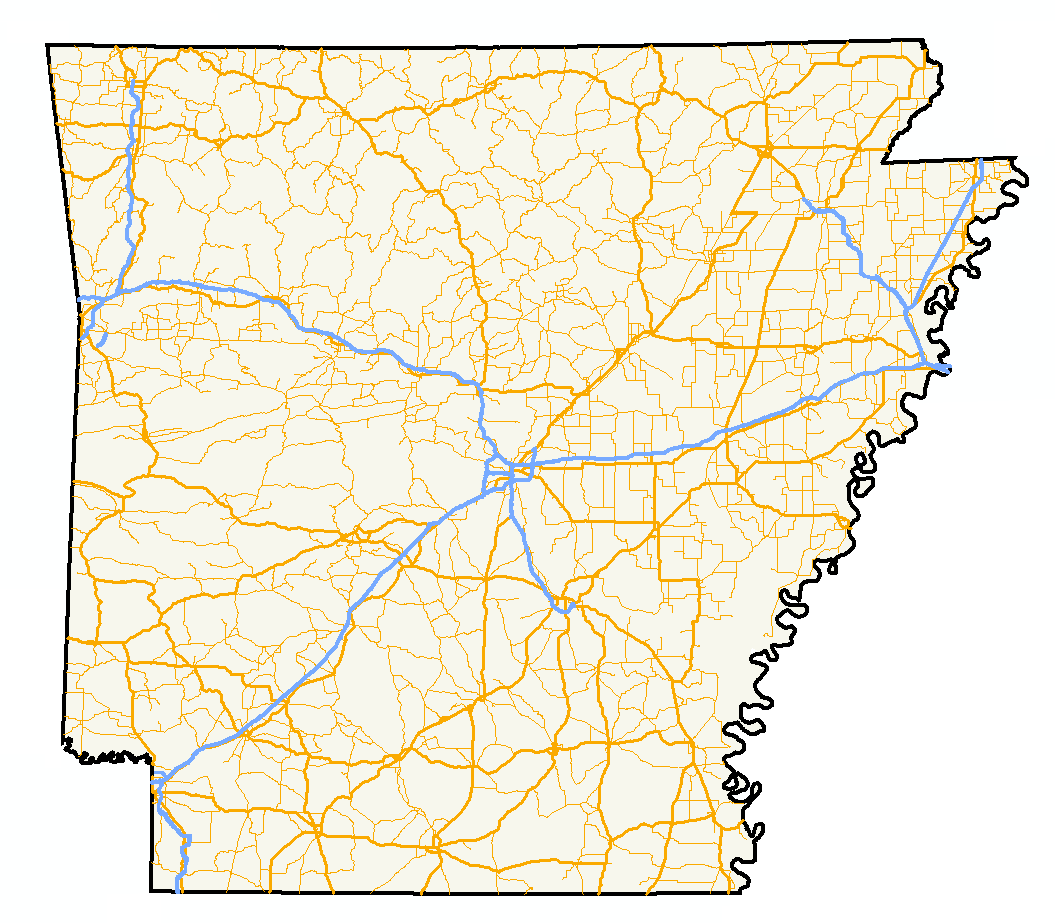
- A map of highways in the state of Arkansas

System information
- Formed: 1924, renumbered in 1926
- State: AR nn, Ark. nn, Hwy. nn

System links
- Arkansas Highway System; Interstate; US; State; Business; Spurs; Suffixed; Scenic; Heritage

The following is a list of state highways in the U.S. state of Arkansas. The state does not use a numbering convention. Generally, the two-digit odd numbered highways run north–south with a few exceptions; and even-numbered two-digit state highways run east–west with a few exceptions.

Arkansas has long had a stigma of poor roads, dating from the "Arkansas Roads Scandal" playing a prominent role in state politics through the 1920s and 1930s, periodic allegations of corruption, waste, and fraud, and a long-running struggle to adequately fund the operation, maintenance and expansion of a large highway system serving a rural state.

The state has received the designation of "worst roads in America" from several publications throughout the 1990s and into the 2000s, with Interstate 30 and Interstate 40 often ranking particularly poorly among truckers. Rankings improved after a large construction project was completed on I-40.

A 2000 survey cited the poor condition of rural interstates, as well as narrow lanes on rural state highways, as areas of concern, ranking Arkansas 47th of the 50 states. A 2011 study found Arkansas's rural highways fourth-most, and the state's roads overall the 16th most deadly.

== State highways ==
Number	Length (mi)	Length (km)	Southern or western terminus	Northern or eastern terminus	Formed	Removed	Notes
AR 1	30.8	49.6	US 278 in McGehee	US 165 at Back Gate	1926	current	
AR 1	34.3	55.2	US 165/AR 1B in DeWitt	US 49 in Marvell	1926	current	
AR 1	95.8	154.2	US 49/AR 85 at Walnut Corner	Route BB at the Missouri state line	1926	current	
AR 2	195	314	US 67 in Texarkana	Ferry to MS 10	1926	1932	Replaced by US 82
AR 3	263	423	LA 159 at Louisiana state line	US 64 near West Memphis	1926	1940	
AR 4	2.99	4.81	SH-4 at the Oklahoma state line	US 59/US 71 in Cove	—	—	
AR 4	22.1	35.6	US 65/US 165/US 278 in McGehee	AR 1 at Rohwer	—	—	
AR 5	45.84	73.77	US 70/US 70B near Hot Springs	I-430/US 70 in Little Rock	1955	current	
AR 5	0.38	0.61	Scott Street in Little Rock	Main Street in North Little Rock	—	—	Unsigned
AR 5	146.63	235.98	I-57/US 67/US 167/AR 321/AR 367 in Cabot	Route 5 at the Missouri state line	1926	current	
AR 6	162	261	US 71	US 65 in Pine Bluff	1926	1935	
AR 6	—	—	US 70 in Brinkley	Mississippi state line	1961	1963	
AR 7	297.27	478.41	LA 558 at the Louisiana state line	Diamond Boulevard in Diamond City	1926	current	Longest state highway in Arkansas.
AR 8	6.0	9.7	SH-63 at the Oklahoma state line	US 59/US 71 in Mena	—	—	
AR 8	143	230	US 59/US 71 in Mena	US 63 in Warren	—	—	
AR 8	79	127	US 63 at Carmel	US 65 in Eudora	—	—	
AR 8	1.4	2.3	US 65 near Eudora	US 65 at Arkla	—	—	
AR 9	51.44	82.78	US 79 at Eagle Mills	US 67/US 270B in Malvern	1926	current	
AR 9	79.76	128.36	AR 5 at Crows	US 65 at Choctaw	1926	current	
AR 9	94.41	151.94	US 65/AR 16 in Clinton	US 63 in Mammoth Spring	1926	current	
AR 10	135.4	217.9	SH-120 at the Oklahoma state line	I-30/US 65/US 67/US 167 in Little Rock	1926	current	
AR 11	9.57	15.40	US 63/AR 35 at Pansy	US 425 near Star City	—	—	
AR 11	22.42	36.08	US 425/AR 114 in Star City	Huff's Island Public Use Area	—	—	
AR 11	12.83	20.65	AR 88 at Reydell	US 165 at Eldridge Corner	—	—	
AR 11	37.52	60.38	I-40/US 63 in Hazen	AR 367 in Searcy	—	—	
AR 12	26.0	41.8	SH-116 at the Oklahoma state line	AR 112 in Bentonville	1926	current	
AR 12	29.9	48.1	US 62/AR 94 in Rogers	AR 23 near Clifty	1926	current	
AR 13	54.58	87.84	US 79 in Humphrey	Campground Road near Beebe	1941	current	
AR 13	17.76	28.58	AR 367 in McRae	AR 385 near Judsonia	1994	current	Former AR 371
AR 13	5.91	9.51	AR 367 in Judsonia	AR 258 near Providence	1994	current	Former AR 371
AR 14	208.12	334.94	Boat Dock Road near Table Rock Lake	I-555 at Payneway	1926	current	
AR 14	19.23	30.95	AR 140 in Lepanto	Mississippi CR S449 at Golden Lake	—	—	
AR 15	21.2	34.1	LA 161 at the Louisiana state line	US 82 in El Dorado	1926	current	
AR 15	18.12	29.16	US 79B near Altheimer	US 165 in England	1926	current	
AR 15	16.33	26.28	US 165 in Keo	AR 89/AR 294 in Furlow	1926	current	
AR 16	24.13	38.83	US 412 in Siloam Springs	I-49/US 62/US 71/AR 16S in Fayetteville	—	—	
AR 16	71.67	115.34	I-49/US 71/AR 265 in Fayetteville	AR 7 in the Ozark National Forest	—	—	
AR 16	132.69	213.54	AR 7/AR 123 at Sand Gap	US 67B in Searcy	—	—	
AR 17	4.9	7.9	Billy Cotten Lane near Ward Reservoir	La Grue Bayou	—	—	
AR 17	11.4	18.3	Morgan Loop Road near Ethel	AR 1 in St. Charles	—	—	
AR 17	21.8	35.1	AR 1 at Cross Roads	US 79 at Park Grove	—	—	
AR 17	10.6	17.1	US 79 near Clarendon	US 70 near Brinkley	1926	current	
AR 17	55.7	89.6	US 49 in Brinkley	AR 14 in Newport	—	—	
AR 17	9.4	15.1	AR 18 in Diaz	AR 37 near Tuckerman	—	—	
AR 18	0.93	1.50	AR 69 near Jacksonport	AR 17 in Diaz	1926	current	
AR 18	92.83	149.40	AR 17 in Diaz	Mississippi River	1926	current	
AR 19	5	8.0	AR 68 at Old Alabam	AR 23 at Forum	c. 1927	c. 1928	Renumbered AR 127
AR 19	18.05	29.05	LA 159 at the Louisiana state line	US 79B in Magnolia	1926	current	
AR 19	24.73	39.80	US 371 in Prescott	Beacon Hill Road at Lake Greeson	1953	current	
AR 20	31.76	51.11	US 70 in Brinkley	Phillips CR 422 near Helena-West Helena	1926	1962	Replaced by AR 6, AR 49, and a spur of AR 49
AR 20	31.76	51.11	Phillips CR 622 at Lambrook	US 49 in Helena-West Helena	1963	current	Former AR 49; has a spur south to Phillips CR 422
AR 21	99.14	159.55	US 64 in Clarksville	Route 13 at the Missouri state line	1926	current	
AR 22	75.60	121.67	US 64/US 71B in Fort Smith	AR 7/AR 27 in Dardanelle	1926	current	
AR 23	133.9	215.5	US 71 near Elm Park	Route P at the Missouri state line	1926	current	
AR 24	18.6	29.9	Panki Bok Road at the Oklahoma state line	US 59/US 71/US 371 in Lockesburg	—	—	
AR 24	38.2	61.5	US 67/US 371 in Prescott	US 278 in Camden	—	—	
AR 25	127.36	204.97	US 64 in Conway	US 63/US 412 in Black Rock	1926	current	
AR 26	58.0	93.3	US 371 near Lockesburg	AR 51 near Arkadelphia	—	—	
AR 26	2.8	4.5	I-30 near Gum Springs	Alcoa plant entrance near Gum Springs	—	—	
AR 27	58.30	93.82	US 59/US 71 near Ben Lomond	US 270 in Mount Ida	1926	current	
AR 27	46.09	74.17	US 270/AR 379 near Mount Ida	AR 10 in Danville	1926	current	
AR 27	18.41	29.63	AR 10 in Danville	AR 7/AR 22 in Dardanelle	1926	current	
AR 27	71.98	115.84	AR 7 in Dover	AR 14 in Harriet	1926	current	
AR 28	20.45	32.91	SH-128 at the Oklahoma state line	US 71 near Waldron	1926	current	
AR 28	43.78	70.46	US 71 at Needmore	AR 27 at Rover	1926	current	
AR 28	10.67	17.17	AR 27 near Rover	AR 7/AR 10 in Ola	1926	current	
AR 28	9.00	14.48	AR 154 at Mt. George	AR 7 in Dardanelle	1963	current	
AR 29	67.6	108.8	LA 3 at the Louisiana state line	AR 19 near Prescott	—	—	
AR 29	4.3	6.9	AR 19 near Antoine	AR 26/AR 301 in Antoine	—	—	
AR 30	—	—	—	—	1926	1958	decommissioned due to creation of I-30; renumbered AR 130
AR 31	77.53	124.77	US 79B near Altheimer	AR 5 near Romance	1926	current	
AR 32	40.02	64.41	SH-3 at the Oklahoma state line	AR 355 at Saratoga	—	—	
AR 32	3.96	6.37	US 278 near Hope Municipal Airport	AR 29 near Hope	—	—	
AR 32	12.00	19.31	US 278 near Hope	AR 53 in Bodcaw	—	—	
AR 32	6.87	11.06	AR 53 near Bodcaw	US 371 in Willisville	—	—	
AR 33	21.76	35.02	AR 130 near Almyra	US 79 in Roe	1956	current	
AR 33	13.03	20.97	US 79 near Roe	US 70 in DeValls Bluff	1926	current	
AR 33	33.79	54.38	US 70 in Biscoe	US 64 near Augusta	1926	current	
AR 33	17.34	27.91	US 64 in Augusta	AR 37 near Tupelo	1926	current	
AR 34	27.22	43.81	US 67B/US 412B/AR 367 in Walnut Ridge	AR 135 in Oak Grove Heights	—	—	
AR 34	12.96	20.86	AR 135 in Lafe	AR 139 at Fritz	—	—	
AR 35	36.4	58.6	Macon Lake Road at Dewey	US 278 in Monticello	—	—	
AR 35	55.9	90.0	US 425 near Monticello	US 167 at Cross Roads	—	—	
AR 35	23.8	38.3	US 167B in Sheridan	I-30/US 67/US 70/AR 5 in Benton	—	—	
AR 36	50.51	81.29	US 64 at Hamlet	I-57/US 64/US 67/US 167/AR 367 in Searcy	1926	current	
AR 36	17.45	28.08	I-57/US 64/US 67/US 167/US 67B in Searcy	Dee Mears Road in Georgetown	1938	current	
AR 37	20.9	33.6	AR 17 near McCrory	AR 14 in Amagon	1926	current	
AR 37	31.9	51.3	AR 14 near Amagon	AR 122 at Cord	1926	current	
AR 37	0.61	0.98	US 62 in Gateway	Route 37 at the Missouri state line	1976	current	
AR 38	50.2	80.8	I-57/US 67/US 167 in Cabot	US 49 near Hunter	1926	current	
AR 38	21.47	34.55	I-40/CR 419 near Widener	AR 147 near Horseshoe Lake	1958	current	
AR 38	0.8	1.3	US 70 in West Memphis	I-40 in West Memphis	—	—	
AR 39	8.89	14.31	AR 1/AR 316 near Turner	US 49 near Hicksville	—	—	
AR 39	9.98	16.06	US 49 at Blackton	US 49/AR 241 near Rich	—	—	
AR 40	—	—	—	—	1926	1958	decommissioned due to creation of I-40; renumbered AR 140
AR 41	38.38	61.77	SH 8 at the Texas state line	US 70B/AR 329 in De Queen	1926	current	
AR 41	18.62	29.97	AR 23 near Chismville	Citadel Park Road near Cecil	1953	current	
AR 42	53.54	86.16	AR 37 near Beedeville	Barton Street in Turrell	1926	current	
AR 43	13.5	21.7	AR 59 in Siloam Springs	Route 43 at the Missouri state line	1971	current	
AR 43	29.5	47.5	AR 21 at Boxley	AR 7 in Harrison	1926	current	
AR 43	1.8	2.9	US 62/US 65/US 412 in Harrison	AR 7 in Harrison	1965	current	
AR 44	11.8	19.0	US 165 near Gillett	La Grue Bayou	—	—	
AR 44	47.1	75.8	Desha CR 629 at Snow Lake	AR 20 in Helena-West Helena	—	—	
AR 44	7.4	11.9	AR 1B in Marianna	Lee CR 239 at Bear Creek Lake	—	—	
AR 45	26.97	43.40	AR 96 in Hartford	I-540/US 71 in Fort Smith	1926	current	
AR 45	10.64	17.12	AR 59 near Dutch Mills	US 62 near Lincoln	1926	current	
AR 45	25.42	40.91	College Avenue in Fayetteville	AR 12 near Clifty	1926	current	
AR 46	39.07	62.88	AR 9	White Bluff Road near Redfield	1926	current	
AR 47	0.61	0.98	US 62 in Gateway	Route 37 at the Missouri state line	1926	1976	Changed to AR 37 to match Missouri
AR 48	14.53	23.38	AR 9	US 167 at Ferindale	1926	current	
AR 49	—	—	—	—	1926	1963	Decommissioned due to extension of US 49 into Arkansas; renumbered AR 20
AR 50	27.96	45.00	St. Francis CR 415	AR 147 near Anthonyville	1926	current	
AR 50	15.84	25.49	US 70	AR 77 in Clarkedale	—	—	
AR 51	57.37	92.33	AR 53 near Whelen Springs	US 67 in Donaldson	1926	current	
AR 51	7.92	12.75	US 270 in Rockport	US 270 at Magnet Cove	1926	current	
AR 52	7.466	12.015	AR 133 at North Crossett	US 82/US 425	1966	current	
AR 52	1.842	2.964	US 82/US 425	Ashley CR 25/Ashley CR 26	1985	current	
AR 52	16.59	26.70	US 165 in Wilmot	AR 159 at Indian	1926	current	
AR 53	53.31	85.79	Bradley Road at the Louisiana state line	US 371	—	—	
AR 53	32.55	52.38	AR 24	AR 8	1926	current	
AR 54	28.80	46.35	US 65/US 165 in Dumas	US 425/AR 11	1926	current	
AR 54	52.65	84.73	AR 114	Grant CR 18	1963	current	
AR 55	22.4	36.0	US 67 in Fulton	AR 27 at Mineral Springs	1926	1958	decommissioned due to creation of I-55; renumbered AR 355
AR 56	42.44	68.30	AR 5 in Calico Rock	AR 58 at Poughkeepsie	1926	current	
AR 57	39.38	63.38	US 82 at Marysville	AR 24 in Chidester	1926	current	
AR 58	54.89	88.34	AR 14	US 62/US 63/US 412 at Ozark Acres	1926	current	
AR 59	—	—	Louisiana state line	Eudora	1926	1935	decommissioned due to creation of new AR 59; renumbered AR 159
AR 59	93.24	150.06	AR 22 in Barling	Route 59 at the Missouri state line	1935	current	
AR 60	71.31	114.76	Crawford CR 23 near Rudy	US 64/US 71B near Van Buren	1926	current	
AR 62	—	—	—	—	1926	1930	Decommissioned due to creation of US 62
AR 66	30.16	48.54	AR 9 in Mountain View	US 65 in Leslie	1926	current	
AR 68	—	—	SH-33 at the Oklahoma state line	US 62 in Alpena	1926	1988	Replaced by US 412
AR 69	57.6	92.7	AR 9 at Melbourne	AR 14/AR 367 in Newport	1926	current	
AR 69	15.3	24.6	AR 163	AR 158 in Lunsford	1926	current	
AR 69	7.4	11.9	US 49/AR 1 in Paragould	US 412/AR 135 in Paragould	1926	current	
AR 72	26.32	42.36	AR 163 at Maysville	Walton Boulevard in Bentonville	1926	current	
AR 72	12.67	20.39	I-49/US 71 in Bentonville	US 62 near Avoca	—	—	
AR 73	18.59	29.92	AR 355	US 278	1926	current	
AR 73	12.37	19.91	US 67 in Hope	AR 53	1926	current	
AR 74	13.06	21.02	AR 170 in Devil's Den State Park	US 71 in Winslow	—	—	
AR 74	2.45	3.94	US 71 near Brentwood	Washington CR 43	1926	current	
AR 74	19.18	30.87	AR 16 in Elkins	US 412B in Huntsville	—	—	
AR 74	13.98	22.50	AR 23	AR 21 at Kingston	—	—	
AR 74	33.92	54.59	AR 21 near Ponca	Newton CR 37/CR 38 near Bass	—	—	
AR 74	7.13	11.47	AR 377 at Snowball	US 65 near Marshall	—	—	
AR 74	18.18	29.26	AR 27 in Marshall	AR 66	—	—	
AR 75	43.465	69.950	AR 38/AR 50	AR 14/AR 140/AR 308B in Marked Tree	1926	current	
AR 76	—	—	—	—	1926	1937	Replaced by AR 60
AR 76	6.6	10.6	AR 57/AR 387 near White Oak Lake State Park	AR 24 near Chidester	—	—	
AR 76	7.2	11.6	US 371	US 278	—	—	
AR 77	66.381	106.830	US 70 in West Memphis	Route 108 at the Missouri state line	1926	current	
AR 78	24.03	38.67	AR 306 near Hunter	US 79	1926	current	
AR 78	4.30	6.92	AR 121 in Aubrey	Lee CR 132/CR 173	1973	current	
AR 79	50	80	US 167/AR 58 in Cave City	Route 21 at Missouri state line	1926	1935	Renumbered AR 115 due to creation of US 79
AR 80	10.3	16.6	Oklahoma state line	AR 45	1926	1930	Replaced by US 62
AR 80	49.87	80.26	AR 28 at Hon	AR 27 in Danville	1945	current	
AR 81	12	19	AR 4 in Hon	AR 1	1926	c. 1928	
AR 81	2.3	3.7	US 63/US 79 near Pine Bluff	US 65/US 425 near Pine Bluff	1945	current	
AR 82	—	—	—	—	1926	1932	decommissioned due to extension of US 82 in Arkansas; renumbered AR 152
AR 83	16.6	26.7	US 425 near Monticello	AR 54 near Star City	1945	current	
AR 83	5.8	9.3	AR 54	AR 114	—	—	
AR 84	3.7	6.0	Polk CR 14 in Bogg Springs	US 71	1926	current	
AR 84	85.8	138.1	US 278 in Umpire	Haltom Road in Malvern	1926	current	
AR 85	9.73	15.66	AR 44 in Lake View	US 49/AR 1 at Walnut Corner	1926	current	
AR 86	7	11	Oklahoma state line	US 71 near Gillham	1926	c. 1928	
AR 86	13.27	21.36	AR 38 at Hayley	Prairie CR 251/CR 522	1965	current	
AR 86	25.33	40.76	US 70 at Screeton	AR 33	1953	current	
AR 86	20.17	32.46	Pine Tree Road/Lumber Lane near Clarendon	US 49	1940 (Note: Map note: Added by Resolution 4/12/40 86-S-3 7.0)	current	
AR 87	14.0	22.5	Fulton CR 2 in Elizabeth	Route AR at the Missouri state line	1926	current	
AR 87	71.2	114.6	AR 14 near Fifty-Six	I-57/US 67 in Bradford	1926	current	
AR 88	60.7	97.7	SH-1 at the Oklahoma state line	US 27 at Washita	—	—	
AR 88	2.7	4.3	AR 7 in Hot Springs	AR 7 in Hot Springs	—	—	
AR 88	1.8	2.9	Spring Street in Lonsdale	US 70 near Lonsdale	—	—	
AR 88	2.6	4.2	AR 35 in Benton	Alcoa Boulevard in Benton	—	—	
AR 88	23.4	37.7	US 79B in Altheimer	AR 11 at Reydell	—	—	
AR 89	16.6	26.7	Lollie Road near Mayflower	Jacksonville-Conway Road near Sherwood	—	—	
AR 89	25.1	40.4	AR 107 near Cabot	US 70 in Lonoke	—	—	
AR 90	81.93	131.85	Main Street in Ravenden	Route 84 at the Missouri state line	1926	current	
AR 91	31.91	51.35	US 49/AR 1 in Jonesboro	US 412 in Walnut Ridge	1926	current	
AR 92	63.4	102.0	US 64 in Plumerville	AR 5/AR 25 at Drasco	1926	current	
AR 93	14.66	23.59	AR 90	Route BB at the Missouri state line	1926	current	
AR 94	22.07	35.52	Horseshoe Bend Park	Route E at the Missouri state line	1926	current	
AR 95	50.5	81.3	US 64 in Morrilton	AR 330	1926	current	
AR 96	38.2	61.5	AR 10 in Greenwood	AR 23	1926	current	
AR 96	1.84	2.96	AR 23 in Ozark	AR 219 in Ozark	1991	current	
AR 97	2	3.2	US 63	AR 91	1926	c. 1928	
AR 97	6.45	10.38	AR 8	US 79 in Kingsland	c. 1940	current	
AR 98	—	—	US 64 in Altus	AR 109	1926	c. 1928	
AR 98	47.15	75.88	US 82	AR 19 at Walkerville	1940	current	
AR 99	—	—	—	—	1926	1971	
AR 100	11	18	US 71 in Bentonville	Route 88 at the Missouri state line	1926	1960	Supplanted by US 71
AR 100	8.72	14.03	AR 365 near Maumelle	I-40/US 65/I-430 in North Little Rock	1987	current	
AR 100	1.61	2.59	AR 365 in North Little Rock	US 70 in North Little Rock	1987	2020	
AR 101	11.17	17.98	US 62/US 412	Route 101 at the Missouri state line	1926	current	
AR 101	7.13	11.47	Marion CR 664 at Hand Valley	US 62/US 412	c. 1928	current	
AR 102	26.184	42.139	AR 43	I-49/US 62/US 71 in Bentonville	1926	current	
AR 102	0.24	0.39	US 71B in Rogers	Olrich Street in Rogers	1985	2007	
AR 103	20.43	32.88	Marina Road/Lakeview Drive in Clarksville	AR 215	—	—	
AR 103	31.31	50.39	AR 43 at the Buffalo National River	AR 21 at Oak Grove	1926	current	
AR 104	8.973	14.441	Southeast Arkansas Community Correction Center in Pine Bluff	I-530/US 63/US 65/US 79/US 425/US 65B in Pine Bluff	1926	2000	Renumbered AR 190
AR 104	4.66	7.50	US 270	AR 365	1926	current	
AR 105	24.90	40.07	Galla Creek Wildlife Management Area	AR 27 near Hector	1926	current	
AR 106	—	—	—	—	1926	1929	
AR 106	12.42	19.99	AR 69 near Cushman	AR 69B in Batesville	1941	current	
AR 107	—	—	—	—	1926	1937	
AR 107	28.32	45.58	I-30/I-40/US 65/US 67/US 167/Main Street in North Little Rock	US 64B in Vilonia	—	—	
AR 107	23.78	38.27	AR 36	AR 110 in Heber Springs	1945	current	
AR 108	—	—	—	—	1926	c. 1928	
AR 108	6.96	11.20	US 59/US 71	US 67	1945	1951	See below
AR 108	26.09	41.99	SH-87 at the Oklahoma state line	US 59/US 71 in Ashdown	1953	current	
AR 108	6.96	11.20	US 59/US 71	US 67	1965	current	
AR 109	32.26	51.92	AR 217	US 64 in Clarksville	1926	current	
AR 110	16.71	26.89	US 65 at Botkinburg	AR 9/AR 16 near Shirley	—	—	
AR 110	3.15	5.07	Greers Ferry Lake	AR 16/AR 92 in Greers Ferry	—	—	
AR 110	20.09	32.33	Eden Isle, Greers Ferry Lake	AR 124 in Pangburn	—	—	
AR 111	2.30	3.70	Alexander	I-30/US 67/US 70	—	—	
AR 112	22.67	36.48	AR 16S in Fayetteville	AR 12 in Bentonville	1926	current	
AR 113	—	—	—	—	1926	1959	
AR 113	29.27	47.11	AR 10	US 64 at Blackwell	—	—	
AR 114	28.66	46.12	AR 35	US 65 in Gould	1926	current	
AR 115	45	72	US 167 in El Dorado	US 167 in Thornton	1926	1935	Supplanted by US 167
AR 115	49.926	80.348	US 167/AR 58 in Cave City	Route 21 at the Missouri state line	1935	current	Former AR 79
AR 116	—	—	—	—	c. 1927	c. 1928	
AR 116	3.40	5.47	AR 23	AR 10	c. 1928	current	
AR 116	1.02	1.64	AR 23	Booneville Human Development Center	—	—	
AR 117	16.54	26.62	AR 25/AR 230 in Strawberry	AR 25 in Black Rock	—	—	
AR 118	45.72	73.58	US 70/US 79 in West Memphis	Mississippi CR 495	—	—	
AR 119	5.640	9.077	AR 14 in Marie	US 61 at Driver	—	—	
AR 119	3.914	6.299	US 61	Unnamed levee road	1927	2022	
AR 119	7.22	11.62	US 61 in Osceola	AR 158 in Victoria	—	—	
AR 119	8.847	14.238	AR 18 in Leachville	Route K/Route Y at the Missouri state line	—	—	
AR 119	3.03	4.88	AR 139	US 49 in Rector	—	—	
AR 120	8.03	12.92	US 61	O'Donnell Bend	—	—	
AR 121	39.53	63.62	Lee CR 153	Lee CR 210/CR 215/CR 233 in La Grange	—	—	
AR 122	16.27	26.18	AR 14	AR 25	—	—	
AR 123	1.62	2.61	Salmon Lane	US 65B in Harrison	1975	current	
AR 123	67.74	109.02	AR 103 in Clarksville	US 65/US 65B in Western Grove	c. 1927	current	
AR 124	72.72	117.03	AR 7 in Russellville	AR 36 in Rose Bud	c. 1927	current	
AR 124	9.08	14.61	AR 110 in Pangburn	AR 157 at Sunnydale	1953	current	
AR 125	29.39	47.30	AR 235 near Bruno	Route 125 at the Missouri state line	—	—	
AR 126	7.03	11.31	US 62/US 412 in Gassville	AR 5/AR 178 at Midway	1928	current	
AR 126	11.66	18.76	Buffalo City	US 62/US 412	1970	current	
AR 127	4.13	6.65	Madison CR 3345	AR 23 at Aurora	1973	current	
AR 127	4.86	7.82	US 412 at Old Alabam	AR 23 at Forum	c. 1928	current	
AR 127	8.58	13.81	AR 12 at Lookout	AR 12	1965	current	
AR 127	5.82	9.37	Buckhorn Circle at Lost Bridge Village	US 62 in Garfield	1966	current	
AR 128	31.7	51.0	AR 24	AR 27	1928	1937	Renumbered AR 26
AR 128	11.99	19.30	AR 7 in Sparkman	AR 9 at Holly Springs	—	—	
AR 128	6.23	10.03	AR 7/AR 8	AR 51 at Joan	—	—	
AR 128	20.04	32.25	AR 7	US 270B in Hot Springs	—	—	
AR 128	8.78	14.13	AR 5 in Fountain Lake	US 70 near Lonsdale	—	—	
AR 129	15.02	24.17	LA 33 at the Louisiana state line	US 82 in Strong	1928	current	
AR 129	4.30	6.92	US 63 at Old Union	Union CR 185 at Lawson	1956	current	
AR 130	8	13	US 65 at Tillar	AR 1 at McArthur	c. 1927	c. 1929	
AR 130	3	4.8	AR 9	Choctaw	c. 1937	1958	Former AR 134, renumbered AR 330
AR 130	25.31	40.73	US 79B in Stuttgart	AR 1B in DeWitt	1958	current	Former AR 30
AR 131	5.27	8.48	AR 1 in Haynes	Lee CR 719/CR 722	—	—	
AR 131	9.57	15.40	US 79	Lee CR 533/CR 632	—	—	
AR 131	8.80	14.16	AR 147 at Bruins	AR 147 at Thompson Grove	—	—	
AR 131	3.01	4.84	Proctor Road	AR 147 in Edmondson	—	—	
AR 131	1.29	2.08	Service Road in West Memphis	I-40 in West Memphis	—	—	
AR 132	25	40	Louisiana state line	US 82 in Magnolia	c. 1928	1994	
AR 132	1.24	2.00	AR 95 in Morrilton	AR 9B in Morrilton	1997	current	
AR 133	15.05	24.22	LA 142 at the Louisiana state line	AR 8 at Long View	—	—	
AR 133	6.29	10.12	AR 160	US 425 at Lacey	—	—	
AR 133	12.51	20.13	AR 35 in Rison	AR 54	—	—	
AR 134	1	1.6	US 65	Choctaw	c. 1928	c. 1931	
AR 134	20.27	32.62	US 71	US 82 in Garland	c. 1928	current	
AR 135	69.53	111.90	I-555 in Tyronza	US 62 near Corning	1929	current	
AR 136	7.87	12.67	AR 135 near Rivervale	AR 77 at Carroll's Corner	—	—	
AR 137	8.82	14.19	AR 312	Route DD at the Missouri state line	1930	current	
AR 138	37.05	59.63	US 278	AR 1 in Kelso	1930	current	
AR 139	17.65	28.40	AR 158 in Caraway	Route F at the Missouri state line	—	—	
AR 139	34.86	56.10	US 412	Route 51	—	—	
AR 140	12	19	US 65 in Dumas	Garrett Bridge	1931	1937	Replaced by AR 54
AR 140	32.70	52.63	US 63B/AR 14 in Marked Tree	US 61 in Osceola	1958	current	Former AR 40
AR 140	1.93	3.11	Pearl Street/Quinn Avenue in Osceola	US 61 in Osceola	1966	current	
AR 141	51.535	82.938	Main Street in Jonesboro	US 62 in McDougal	1931	current	
AR 141	2.053	3.304	Culberhouse Street in Jonesboro	Parker Road in Jonesboro	1973	current	
AR 142	5.14	8.27	Levee Road near Lakeport	US 82/US 278 at Shives	c. 1930	current	
AR 143	—	—	US 63 near Rivervale	AR 18 in Black Oak	1931	1955	Replaced by AR 135
AR 143	10.08	16.22	US 62/AR 980	Route H at the Missouri state line	1965	current	
AR 144	20.50	32.99	US 165 near Jerome	Mississippi River levee	c. 1932	current	
AR 144	4.16	6.69	Big Bayou Meto Use Area	US 165/AR 1	1973	current	
AR 145	9.005	14.492	AR 14	AR 37	1931	current	
AR 145	8.293	13.346	AR 42	AR 37	1935	current	
AR 145	15.344	24.694	AR 269	US 64/AR 17 in McCrory	1966	current	
AR 145	5.527	8.895	AR 367 in Tuckerman	CR 85	1974	current	
AR 146	12.96	20.86	US 79 near Stuttgart	White River at Preston Ferry	1932	current	
AR 146	17.43	28.05	Resort Road at Lawrenceville	AR 39 at Noy	1965	current	
AR 147	25.83	41.57	AR 131 at Bruins	US 64 near West Memphis	—	—	
AR 148	4.61	7.42	AR 151	Mississippi River levee	—	—	
AR 148	8.81	14.18	AR 181	US 61 in Burdette	—	—	
AR 148	3.53	5.68	AR 135 in Black Oak	AR 139	—	—	
AR 149	41.28	66.43	AR 38 in Hughes	I-555/US 63B in Marked Tree	—	—	
AR 150	14.19	22.84	AR 181 in Gosnell	AR 137 at Huffman	—	—	
AR 151	5.8	9.3	AR 148	AR 18 in Blytheville	—	—	
AR 151	6.7	10.8	AR 18 in Blytheville	Route TT at the Missouri state line	—	—	
AR 152	13.344	21.475	US 79 near Humphrey	US 165	1957	current	
AR 152	0.714	1.149	US 165 in DeWitt	AR 1B in DeWitt	1933	current	
AR 152	7.488	12.051	US 165/AR 267	AR 17 at DeLuce	1933	current	Former AR 82
AR 153	29.8	48.0	AR 17 near Ethel	AR 130 near Stuttgart	—	—	
AR 154	41.0	66.0	AR 27 near Danville	AR 113 near Oppelo	—	—	
AR 155	7.10	11.43	Mount Nebo State Park	AR 22 in Dardanelle	—	—	
AR 155	7.56	12.17	AR 7 near Datto	AR 154	—	—	
AR 155	11.16	17.96	AR 10 near Casa	AR 154 at Petit Jean State Park	—	—	
AR 155	11.16	17.96	AR 60	Perry CR 14	—	—	
AR 156	0.307	0.494	SH-100 at the Oklahoma state line	AR 59 near Evansville	1938	current	
AR 156	4.208	6.772	AR 265 at Hogeye	AR 170 in West Fork	1973	current	
AR 156	2.892	4.654	US 71 in Fayetteville	Pump Station Road in Fayetteville	1973	current	
AR 156	2.53	4.07	Old Wire Road	AR 45	1973	1981	
AR 156	0.37	0.60	US 62 in Prairie Grove	Sedgewick Drive in Prairie Grove	1980	2007	
AR 157	36.83	59.27	AR 367 in Judsonia	AR 14	c. 1937	current	
AR 157	0.68	1.09	AR 17/AR 18 in Diaz	AR 367 in Diaz	1976	current	
AR 158	44.24	71.20	AR 1 in Greenfield	US 61 in Luxora	1936	current	
AR 158	0.33	0.53	US 49	Agriculture facility	1979	current	
AR 159	7.8	12.6	LA 17 at the Louisiana state line	AR 8 in Eudora	—	—	
AR 159	5.5	8.9	AR 160 near Chicot	AR 144 in Lake Village	—	—	
AR 159	5.5	8.9	AR 160 near Chicot	AR 144 in Lake Village	—	—	
AR 159	4.9	7.9	AR 35/AR 208 in Halley	AR 4 near McGehee	—	—	
AR 159	5.5	8.9	AR 1 in McGehee	US 65 in McGehee	—	—	
AR 159	4.6	7.4	US 65 near Masonville	US 278 in McGehee	—	—	
AR 159	1.5	2.4	AR 138 near Winchester	US 65 in Omega	—	—	
AR 159	4.4	7.1	AR 54 in Dumas	US 65 in Mitchellville	—	—	
AR 160	51.55	82.96	FM 249 at the Texas state line	AR 19 in Macedonia	—	—	
AR 160	14.73	23.71	AR 57 in Mount Holly	AR 7B in Smackover	—	—	
AR 160	38.99	62.75	US 278	US 425 in Fountain Hill	—	—	
AR 160	22.73	36.58	US 82	US 65 in Chicot Junction	—	—	Former AR 278
AR 161	5.9	9.5	I-440/Jacksonville Highway in Jacksonville	I-57/US 67/US 167/Vandenberg Boulevard in Jacksonville	1960	current	
AR 161	19.71	31.72	US 165 in England	US 165 at Scott	—	—	
AR 161	—	—	US 67	US 64	—	1970	Redesignated as an extension of AR 5
AR 162	1.5	2.4	AR 120	End state maintenance	1937	1939	
AR 162	1	1.6	AR 7 near El Dorado	US 167 near El Dorado	1945	1950	
AR 162	11.29	18.17	US 64/US 71B in Van Buren	I-40/US 71/US 71B in Alma	1953	current	
AR 162	5.39	8.67	AR 59 in Cedarville	Crawford CR 24 at Hobbtown	1973	current	
AR 163	2.2	3.5	Wittsburg	US 64 at Levesque	1942 (Note: Map note: Number Assigned May 28, 1942 Rt-163-S-1)	c. 1945	
AR 163	42.57	68.51	Cross CR 739 at Wittsburg	AR 1/AR 1 in Jonesboro	1957	current	
AR 164	13.289	21.387	US 64 in Coal Hill	AR 103	1957	current	
AR 164	13.127	21.126	AR 21 in Clarksville	AR 7	1945	current	
AR 164	1.793	2.886	AR 27 at Scottsville	FR 1001/Broomfield Road	1963	current	
AR 164	9.814	15.794	AR 7 in Dover	AR 105 at Oak Grove	1963	current	
AR 166	7.97	12.83	AR 361 in Old Davidsonville State Park	US 62 in Pocahontas	—	—	
AR 166	14.57	23.45	US 62/US 67 in Pocahontas	Route A at the Missouri state line	—	—	
AR 168	8.59	13.82	AR 228 in Fontaine	US 412	—	—	
AR 169	4.9	7.9	US 79 in Humphrey	AR 13	1973	1977	Supplanted by AR 13
AR 169	7.82	12.59	Sulphur Springs	Hancock Road in Crossett	1985	current	section south of US 82 was formerly part of AR 278
AR 169	2.21	3.56	Arkansas Post National Memorial	US 65/US 165 in McGehee	c. 1936	current	
AR 169	1.27	2.04	AR 4 in McGehee	US 65/US 165 in McGehee	2000	current	
AR 170	17.3	27.8	AR 74/AR 220 at Devil's Den State Park	US 71 in West Fork	—	—	
AR 170	5.4	8.7	US 62 in Prairie Grove	US 62 in Farmington	—	—	
AR 171	1.19	1.92	US 67 near Gifford	Wine Dot Road near Gifford	1939	current	
AR 171	11.67	18.78	I-30/AR 84 near Malvern	Lake Catherine State Park	1939	current	
AR 171	4.91	7.90	US 270 near Price	Tigre Mountain Road at the Garland County line	1939	current	
AR 172	—	—	—	—	1939	1941	
AR 172	23.5	37.8	US 425 near Monticello	US 278 near Warren	—	—	
AR 172	7.0	11.3	US 167 near Hampton	AR 160 near Jersey	—	—	
AR 173	1.3	2.1	US 63	AR 1	c. 1940	1979	
AR 173	6.66	10.72	Overflow National Wildlife Refuge	US 165 in Wilmot	1985	current	
AR 174	4.0	6.4	US 67 near Hope	AR 299 near Emmet	—	—	
AR 174	6.1	9.8	AR 355 in Spring Hill	US 67 near Hope	—	—	
AR 175	21.80	35.08	AR 289 in Cherokee Village	Wirth	1940 (Note: Map note: 175 Added to System by Resolution 9/5/40)	current	
AR 176	2.1	3.4	I-40/US 65/AR 365 in North Little Rock	Camp Robinson Road in North Little Rock	—	—	
AR 176	3.0	4.8	AR 107 in Sherwood	I-57/US 67/US 167/Rixie Road in Sherwood	—	—	
AR 177	16.20	26.07	Shield Lane in Herron	AR 223 in Pineville	—	—	
AR 178	—	—	—	—	1945	1951	
AR 178	24.4	39.3	US 62//US 412 in Flippin	US 62B in Mountain Home	—	—	
AR 178	4.3	6.9	US 62B in Mountain Home	Norfork Lake	—	—	
AR 179	—	—	Columbia Street in Magnolia	US 79 in Magnolia	1941	1968	
AR 179	2.903	4.672	Franklin CR 93 at Greenwood	US 64 in Altus	1998	current	Former AR 924
AR 180	1.65	2.66	I-49/US 62/US 71 in Fayetteville	School Avenue in Fayetteville	1945	current	
AR 181	2.4	3.9	US 61 in Bassett	I-55 near Bassett	—	—	
AR 181	31.2	50.2	AR 14 in Marie	Route NN at the Missouri state line	—	—	
AR 182	7.2	11.6	AR 84 in Amity	US 70 near Bonnerdale	—	—	
AR 182	12.4	20.0	AR 51 in Okolona	US 67/AR 53 in Gurdon	—	—	
AR 183	8.8	14.2	AR 35 in Benton	AR 5 in Bryant	—	—	
AR 184	7.3	11.7	US 64 in Parkin	US 64 in Earle	—	—	
AR 185	2.3	3.7	AR 242 in Helena-West Helena	US 49B in Helena-West Helena	—	—	
AR 185	2.5	4.0	US 49 in Wycamp	AR 242 in Helena-West Helena	—	—	
AR 185	2.6	4.2	AR 44 in Marianna	Lee CR 215	—	—	
AR 186	9.5	15.3	Franklin CR 97 at Alix	Franklin CR 90 in Wiederkehr	—	—	
AR 187	—	—	—	—	1945	1952	
AR 187	16.6	26.7	AR 23 near Eureka Springs	US 62	—	—	
AR 188	8.11	13.05	AR 27	Little Fir Use Area	1965	current	
AR 189	0.9	1.4	Ashley CR 17	US 82/US 425/AR 8 in Hamburg	—	—	
AR 189	9.9	15.9	AR 160 near Milo	US 82/US 425/AR 8 in Hamburg	—	—	
AR 189	3.8	6.1	US 278 in Warren	US 63 in Warren	—	—	
AR 189	23.8	38.3	AR 8 in Orlando	End state maintenance near Kingsland	—	—	
AR 190	4.48	7.21	US 270 in Prattsville	AR 46	1965	current	
AR 190	6.30	10.14	AR 35	AR 291 in Tull	1966	current	
AR 190	6.70	10.78	AR 35	Princeton Pike at the Jefferson County line	1966	current	
AR 190	8.973	14.441	Southeast Arkansas Community Correction Center in Pine Bluff	I-530/US 63/US 65/US 79/US 425/US 65B in Pine Bluff	2000	current	
AR 191	2.3	3.7	US 70 in West Memphis	AR 77 in West Memphis	—	—	
AR 192	5.6	9.0	AR 227 near Lake Ouachita State Park	AR 7 in Hot Springs Village	—	—	
AR 192	5.3	8.5	US 70 near Rockwell	Marion Anderson Road near Lake Hamilton	—	—	
AR 193	17.8	28.6	AR 306 near Colt	AR 42 near Hickory Ridge	—	—	
AR 194	—	—	—	—	1965	1992	
AR 195	12.3	19.8	US 371 near McCaskill	AR 26 in Delight	—	—	
AR 195	6.9	11.1	AR 332	US 371 near Blevins	—	—	
AR 195	13.9	22.4	AR 355 in Fulton	US 278 near Washington	—	—	
AR 196	17.8	28.6	US 71 in Texarkana	AR 134 near Garland City	—	—	
AR 197	3.1	5.0	AR 22 in New Blaine	Shoal Bay Recreational Area	—	—	
AR 197	16.7	26.9	AR 22 in Subiaco	End state maintenance near Lake Dardanelle	—	—	
AR 198	2.5	4.0	AR 69/AR 214 in Trumann	AR 463 in Trumann	—	—	
AR 198	2.7	4.3	AR 140	AR 77	—	—	
AR 198	3.4	5.5	US 61	Sans Souchi Landing	—	—	
AR 199	6.79	10.93	US 425 at Terry	US 65 at Linwood	1965	current	
AR 200	9.6	15.4	US 278/US 371 in Rosston	AR 299 in Morris	—	—	
AR 200	1.9	3.1	US 371 in Prescott	AR 19 in Prescott	—	—	
AR 201	24.05	38.70	AR 341 in Salesville	Route J at the Missouri state line	1957	current	
AR 202	7.38	11.88	US 62/US 412 in Yelleville	AR 178 in Flippin	1957	current	
AR 202	3.00	4.83	AR 14 at Lakeway	End state maintenance	1973	1975	
AR 202	9.63	15.50	Marion CR 141	AR 5	1975	current	
AR 203	20.2	32.5	US 278 in Hampton	AR 274 in East Camden	—	—	
AR 203	8.0	12.9	US 79B in Bearden	AR 9 near Holly Springs	—	—	
AR 204	2.50	4.02	AR 12 in Gentry	AR 59 in Gentry	1980	1994	Supplanted by AR 59S
AR 204	—	—	AR 43 in Siloam Springs	AR 59 in Siloam Springs	1957	1996	Supplanted by AR 43
AR 204	0.35	0.56	Airport Road	US 71B	1975	2015	
AR 205	6.8	10.9	US 79B in Thornton	Ouachita County line	—	—	
AR 205	4.5	7.2	US 79 in Camden	AR 274 in East Camden	—	—	
AR 205	2.0	3.2	Tri-County Lake Access	AR 8 near Fordyce	—	—	
AR 206	14.807	23.830	AR 43	US 62/US 65/US 412 in Bellefonte	1957	current	
AR 206	10.44	16.80	US 62/US 412 at Little Arkansaw	AR 7 in Harrison	1963	1990	Renumbered to AR 392
AR 206	5.541	8.917	US 65	Marion CR 4019	1973	current	
AR 206	2.952	4.751	AR 14 at Ralph	Marion CR 6022	1973	current	
AR 207	8.16	13.13	AR 128	AR 8	1957	1973	
AR 207	4.145	6.671	AR 7 near Ouachita	AR 128 near Pine Grove	1962	current	
AR 208	7.3	11.7	US 165 in Dermott	US 65	—	—	
AR 208	8.3	13.4	Macon Lake Road	AR 35/AR 159 in Halley	—	—	
AR 209	1.02	1.64	AR 8 in Parkdale	US 165 in Parkdale	1975	current	
AR 209	0.59	0.95	US 65	AR 8 in Readland	1957	current	
AR 210	0.82	1.32	Greers Ferry Lake	AR 25B in Heber Springs	c. 1970	current	
AR 210	2.25	3.62	AR 110	Cow Shoals Lane	1957	current	
AR 211	9.7	15.6	US 62/US 67 near Datto	Route E at the Missouri state line	—	—	
AR 212	12.9	20.8	US 65/AR 114 in Gould	Pendleton	—	—	
AR 212	6.7	10.8	AR 54	AR 114 in Star City	—	—	
AR 213	9.4	15.1	AR 54	AR 124	—	—	
AR 214	8.9	14.3	AR 163 near Harrisburg	AR 463 near Payneway	—	—	
AR 214	13.8	22.2	US 49 in Fisher	AR 1 near Harrisburg	—	—	
AR 215	8.8	14.2	Franklin CR 31/CR 221	AR 96 near Cecil	—	—	
AR 215	15.9	25.6	US 64 in Mulberry	Shores Lake in the Ouachita National Forest	—	—	
AR 215	16.4	26.4	AR 23 at Cass	Oark	—	—	
AR 216	10.3	16.6	AR 9/AR 10 near Perryville	AR 60/AR 113 in Houston	—	—	
AR 217	10.7	17.2	AR 23 in Booneville	End state maintenance near Sugar Grove	—	—	
AR 217	19.1	30.7	AR 23 near Booneville	AR 252 near Island	—	—	
AR 218	7.4	11.9	US 70/US 79 near Jennette	AR 147 at Cunningham Corner	—	—	
AR 219	10.88	17.51	US 64 in Ozark	Franklin CR 312	1957	current	
AR 219	1.5	2.4	Mountain View Road near Ozark	US 64 in Ozark	—	—	
AR 220	17.0	27.4	AR 59 near Cedarville	AR 170 at Devil's Den State Park	—	—	
AR 221	18.25	29.37	Madison CR 1425 at the Madison County line	Route 39 at the Missouri state line	1957	current	
AR 222	17.6	28.3	AR 51 near Donaldson	AR 229 near Jenkins Ferry State Park	—	—	
AR 223	29.9	48.1	AR 56 in Calico Rock	Route E at the Missouri state line	—	—	
AR 224	8.3	13.4	AR 367	Swifton city line	—	—	
AR 224	17.9	28.8	I-57/US 67	I-57/US 67/AR 14 near Newport	—	—	
AR 225	17.9	28.8	AR 285 at Bethleham	AR 107 near Enders	—	—	
AR 226	25.28	40.68	AR 367	I-555/US 63/AR 18 in Jonesboro	1957	current	
AR 226	2.38	3.83	Jackson CR 278	AR 37	1996	current	
AR 227	11.7	18.8	US 270 at Piney	Lake Ouachita State Park	—	—	
AR 227	7.4	11.9	US 70 at Hempwallace	US 270 near Royal	—	—	
AR 228	4.5	7.2	Clover Bend	AR 367 in Minturn	—	—	
AR 228	15.8	25.4	AR 91	US 412 in Light	—	—	
AR 229	57.61	92.71	AR 8 in Fordyce	I-30/US 67/US 70 in Benton	1957	current	
AR 230	8.15	13.12	AR 14/AR 25 at Locust Grove	US 167 in Southside	1978	current	
AR 230	13.80	22.21	US 167 in Cave City	AR 25/AR 117 in Strawberry	1957	current	
AR 230	16.25	26.15	AR 367 in Alicia	US 63B in Bono	1965	current	
AR 230	7.04	11.33	US 49B in Brookland	AR 135 at Dixie	1966	current	
AR 230	1.6	2.6	Craighead CR 762/CR 763	AR 1	1973	1979	
AR 230	2.28	3.67	Jackson CR 70	US 67	1975	1979	
AR 231	5.79	9.32	AR 34	US 412	—	—	
AR 231	3.02	4.86	AR 90 near O'Kean	AR 304 at Sharum	—	—	
AR 231	6.12	9.85	AR 251	AR 93	1980	current	
AR 231	7.5	12.1	AR 115	AR 251 at Warm Springs	1973	1980	
AR 231	1.02	1.64	US 67	Walnut Ridge Industrial Park	1980	—	
AR 232	1.1	1.8	Pulaski County line	US 165 in Keo	—	—	
AR 232	7.2	11.6	AR 31 at Blakemore	AR 13 near Hamilton	—	—	
AR 233	18.5	29.8	US 167/AR 25/AR 69 in Batesville	AR 69B in Newark	—	—	
AR 234	23.1	37.2	Oklahoma state line	US 71 in Wilton	—	—	
AR 234	9.9	15.9	US 71 near Ben Lomond	End state maintenance at Paraloma	—	—	
AR 235	19.73	31.75	US 65 in Pindall	AR 14 in Yellville	—	—	
AR 236	12.51	20.13	AR 89 in Cabot	AR 13	—	—	
AR 237	25.91	41.70	AR 160	US 67 in Texarkana	—	—	
AR 238	17.6	28.3	US 49/US 70 in Brinkley	US 79 near Moro	—	—	
AR 239	1.47	2.37	AR 325	Mississippi CR 718 in Osceola	—	—	
AR 239	10.30	16.58	AR 148	AR 188	—	—	
AR 240	11.8	19.0	End state maintenance near Hopper	AR 8/AR 27 near Caddo Gap	—	—	
AR 241	7.08	11.39	US 67/AR 39	AR 302	1957	current	
AR 242	14.7	23.7	AR 1 near Lexa	AR 44 near Helena-West Helena	—	—	
AR 243	7.8	12.6	AR 121 in Rondo	AR 1 near Marianna	—	—	
AR 243	10.3	16.6	US 49/AR 1 in Marvell	AR 121 near Aubrey	—	—	
AR 244	0.594	0.956	SH-51 at the Oklahoma state line	AR 59	1961	current	
AR 244	6.704	10.789	AR 59	AR 16	1973	current	
AR 245	8.75	14.08	Loop 151 at the Texas state line	I-30 in Texarkana	1957	2013	
AR 246	26.16	42.10	US 59/US 71 near Vandervoort	AR 84 at Athens	1957	current	
AR 246	5.99	9.64	Zafra Road at the Oklahoma state line	US 59/US 71 in Hatfield	1963	current	
AR 247	7.7	12.4	AR 7 in Russellville	I-40/US 64/AR 363 in Pottsville	—	—	
AR 247	10.2	16.4	AR 105 in Atkins	AR 213 in Hattieville	—	—	
AR 247	1.7	2.7	AR 9B in Morrilton	AR 95 in Morrilton	—	—	
AR 247	4.5	7.2	AR 155	AR 154 in Pontoon	—	—	
AR 248	10.1	16.3	AR 80 in Waldron	Cold Spring Road at Cardiff	—	—	
AR 248	10.1	16.3	Little Pines Recreation Area	US 71 in Waldron	—	—	
AR 249	8.7	14.0	US 70 in Hazen	AR 11 near Hazen	—	—	
AR 250	12.8	20.6	US 71B in Waldron	AR 80 near Waldron	—	—	
AR 251	15.28	24.59	AR 115 near Pocahontas	Route P at the Missouri state line	—	—	
AR 252	9.4	15.1	AR 22 near Charleston	AR 96	—	—	
AR 253	0.8	1.3	AR 255 in Barling	AR 22 in Barling	—	—	
AR 253	2.0	3.2	AR 45 in Fort Smith	I-540/US 271 in Fort Smith	—	—	
AR 253	8.8	14.2	AR 45/AR 252 in Midland	AR 10 near Greenwood	—	—	
AR 254	20.68	33.28	AR 27	US 65 at Dennard	1957	current	
AR 255	7.4	11.9	AR 22 in Central City	AR 22 near Lavaca	—	—	
AR 255	17.2	27.7	US 64/US 71B in Fort Smith	AR 22 in Barling	—	—	
AR 256	14.3	23.0	End state maintenance near Wright	US 165/AR 15/AR 161 in England	—	—	
AR 256	2.1	3.4	I-530/US 65 in White Hall	Pine Bluff Arsenal entrance	—	—	
AR 257	3.9	6.3	US 65/AR 144	AR 144 near Lake Village	—	—	
AR 257	0.5	0.80	Lake Chicot State Park	AR 144	—	—	
AR 258	8.2	13.2	AR 13 near Providence	US 167 in Bald Knob	—	—	
AR 259	12.1	19.5	AR 238 near Moro	US 70 at Lake Grove	—	—	
AR 259	6.9	11.1	AR 306	AR 284	—	—	
AR 259	3.1	5.0	AR 364	AR 42 near Hickory Ridge	—	—	
AR 260	19.3	31.1	AR 33 near Augusta	AR 145	—	—	May be more than one route
AR 261	15.15	24.38	AR 259 at South Plains	I-40 in Palestine	1957	current	
AR 261	4.37	7.03	St. Francis CR 255/CR 265 at Horton	AR 1 in Caldwell	1973	current	
AR 262	11.5	18.5	AR 33	AR 33 near Gregory	—	—	
AR 263	43.7	70.3	AR 92 near Greers Ferry	AR 14 in Big Flat	—	—	
AR 264	7.8	12.6	US 71B in Springdale	Beaver Lake	—	—	
AR 264	13.1	21.1	AR 12 in Highfill	US 71B in Lowell	—	—	
AR 264	2.7	4.3	US 412/AR 59 in Siloam Springs	Brashears Road	—	—	
AR 265	19.70	31.70	AR 170 near Strickler	I-49/US 71/AR 16 in Fayetteville	1957	current	
AR 265	12.07	19.42	AR 16 in Fayetteville	AR 94 in Rogers	c. 1973	current	
AR 265	3.33	5.36	AR 94 in Pea Ridge	Route KK at the Missouri state line	1973	2025	
AR 266	0.87	1.40	US 64/US 65B in Conway	Siebenmorgen Road in Conway	—	—	
AR 267	15.47	24.90	AR 31	AR 367 in Searcy	—	—	
AR 267	2.25	3.62	AR 31	AR 13	—	—	
AR 268	3.00	4.83	AR 14	Marion CR 227/CR 259	1973	current	
AR 268	2.78	4.47	AR 14 near Mull	Buffalo National River	—	—	
AR 269	16.94	27.26	US 49	AR 37	1957	current	
AR 272	2.06	3.32	US 71B in Waldron	Waldron Municipal Airport	1973	current	
AR 272	1.58	2.54	AR 88 in Queen Wilhelmina State Park	US 59/US 270	1958	current	
AR 273	15.7	25.3	AR 9 near Holly Springs	US 79/US 167 in Fordyce	—	—	
AR 273	2.2	3.5	AR 229	US 167 near Ivan	—	—	
AR 274	23.6	38.0	US 278 in Hampton	US 79B/AR 8 in Fordyce	—	—	
AR 274	18.9	30.4	US 278 in East Camden	US 167 near Hampton	—	—	
AR 275	18.9	30.4	LA 549 at the Louisiana state line	US 63 near Moro Bay	—	—	
AR 275	7.4	11.9	US 278 in Banks	AR 274 in Tinsman	—	—	
AR 276	16.17	26.02	US 165 at Lodge Corner	US 165/AR 1 at Indiana	1963	current	
AR 276	1.62	2.61	Gregory Fisher Road/Lennox Road in Stuttgart	US 79B in Stuttgart	1974	current	
AR 277	7.6	12.2	AR 83 at Coleman	AR 293	—	—	
AR 277	6.7	10.8	US 278	US 65 in Tillar	—	—	
AR 277	11.4	18.3	US 165 near Dumas	AR 1 at Pea Ridge	—	—	
AR 278	22.73	36.58	US 82 at Thebes	US 65/US 278 at Chicot Junction	1963	1998	Supplanted by AR 160 due to US 278 extension into Arkansas
AR 278	0.94	1.51	US 82 in Hamburg	Ashley CR 73	1973	1998	Supplanted by AR 189 due to US 278 extension into Arkansas
AR 278	6.79	10.93	US 82 in Crossett	Sulphur Springs	1973	1998	Supplanted by AR 169 due to US 278 extension into Arkansas
AR 279	14.9	24.0	AR 12 at Vaughn	Route OO at the Missouri state line	—	—	
AR 280	5.85	9.41	AR 90 near Delaplaine	AR 90 in Peach Orchard	1963	current	
AR 281	12.33	19.84	AR 7 near Bergman	Bull Shoals Lake	1963	current	
AR 282	19.48	31.35	US 64 near Van Buren	Brown Street in Chester	—	—	
AR 283	3.14	5.05	AR 7	AR 128 at Caney	1963	current	
AR 283	1.14	1.83	US 67 in Friendship	Post Oak Road	1968	current	
AR 284	34.83	56.05	US 49 at Penrose	AR 1B in Forrest City	1963	current	
AR 285	6.2	10.0	US 65 near Greenbrier	Woolly Hollow State Park	—	—	
AR 285	9.9	15.9	AR 25 in Wooster	AR 124 at Martinville	—	—	
AR 285	4.9	7.9	US 65 in Damascus	AR 92 at Rabbit Ridge	—	—	
AR 286	6.5	10.5	I-40/US 65/US 65B in Conway	Clinton Road at Saltillo	—	—	
AR 287	4.8	7.7	AR 9 in Morrilton	AR 92	—	—	
AR 287	9.0	14.5	AR 9 in Solgohachia	AR 95 in Prairie View	—	—	
AR 288	10.0	16.1	AR 41	AR 309 in Roseville	—	—	
AR 288	4.6	7.4	AR 197	AR 109 near Scranton	—	—	
AR 289	4.9	7.9	AR 69B at Sage	Zion	—	—	
AR 289	37.9	61.0	AR 56 in Franklin	AR 9 in Mammoth Spring	—	—	
AR 290	10.06	16.19	AR 7 in Lake Hamilton	AR 171 in Diamondhead	—	—	
AR 291	15.71	25.28	AR 46 in Dogwood	AR 190 in Tull	—	—	
AR 292	3.78	6.08	AR 21 in Ludwig	AR 123/AR 164 in Tull	—	—	
AR 293	5.8	9.3	US 425/AR 11 in Star City	Cane Creek State Park	—	—	
AR 293	30.2	48.6	US 278 near Selma	AR 11/AR 114 in Meroney	—	—	
AR 294	8.2	13.2	AR 161 in Jacksonville	AR 15/AR 89 in Furlow	—	—	
AR 295	5.5	8.9	Madison CR 4035	AR 16 at Crosses	—	—	
AR 295	3.1	5.0	AR 16	Madison CR 5445	—	—	
AR 295	4.7	7.6	Madison CR 5395	AR 74 at Drake's Creek	—	—	
AR 295	3.1	5.0	AR 74 at Wesley	US 412 near Hindsville	—	—	
AR 296	25.68	41.33	US 59/US 71 in Texarkana	US 82	1963	current	
AR 297	1.7	2.7	AR 140 in West Ridge	AR 77	—	—	
AR 297	2.0	3.2	AR 14 near Dyess	Mississippi CR 139 near Dyess	—	—	
AR 298	3.7	6.0	AR 88 at Sims	US 270	—	—	
AR 298	28.4	45.7	AR 27 at Story	AR 7 near Jessieville	—	—	
AR 298	13.8	22.2	AR 9 at Paron	AR 5 near Kentucky	—	—	
AR 299	16.2	26.1	I-30/AR 174	AR 24/AR 387 in Bluff City	—	—	
AR 300	34.11	54.89	AR 9/AR 10 near Perryville	AR 10 in Little Rock	—	—	
AR 300	1.45	2.33	I-430 in Little Rock	US 70 in Little Rock	—	—	
AR 301	23.49	37.80	AR 26/AR 27 in Murfreesboro	AR 29 in Antoine	1963	current	
AR 302	3.0	4.8	AR 86 near Hazen	AR 249 near Hazen	—	—	
AR 302	3.2	5.1	AR 33 near De Valls Bluff	Prairie CR 218/CR 222	—	—	
AR 302	10.9	17.5	US 79B in Clarendon	AR 17 near Brinkley	—	—	
AR 303	1.86	2.99	Madison CR 192	AR 74	—	—	
AR 303	9.62	15.48	AR 45 at Mayfield	Benton County line	1963	current	
AR 303	2.27	3.65	AR 12	Madison CR 99	—	—	
AR 304	2.27	3.65	US 67/AR 90 in Pocahontas	AR 34/AR 90 in Delaplaine	1963	current	
AR 305	0.9	1.4	AR 367 in Austin	Main Street in Austin	—	—	
AR 305	7.5	12.1	AR 31 at Floyd	AR 36 near Crosby	—	—	
AR 305	11.0	17.7	AR 16 near Albion	End state maintenance at Hickory Flat	—	—	
AR 306	6.7	10.8	AR 38 in Cotton Plant	Woodruff CR 680 at Becton	—	—	
AR 306	24.3	39.1	US 49 in Hunter	AR 284 near Colt	—	—	
AR 306	6.7	10.8	Cross CR 825	AR 75 near Parkin	—	—	
AR 307	4.1	6.6	AR 10 in Belleville	End state maintenance in the Ozark National Forest	—	—	
AR 307	3.7	6.0	End state maintenance in the Ozark National Forest	AR 27 near Chickalah	—	—	
AR 308	6.216	10.004	AR 149 in Marked Tree	AR 135 at Spear Lake	1963	current	
AR 308	10.940	17.606	AR 118 at Whitton	US 61 at Frenchman's Bayou	1973	current	
AR 308	1.00	1.61	End state maintenance	AR 75	1973	1979	
AR 309	5.11	8.22	Yell CR 28	AR 10 at Waveland	—	—	
AR 309	42.90	69.04	AR 10 in Havana	AR 23 at Webb City	—	—	
AR 309	1.84	2.96	AR 23 in Ozark	AR 219 in Ozark	1975	1991	Redesignated AR 96
AR 310	12.6	20.3	AR 5 near Romance	Clinton Mountain Road	—	—	
AR 310	13.4	21.6	AR 16 near Letona	AR 36 near Rose Bud	—	—	
AR 311	22.7	36.5	Industrial Park Drive in Green Forest	AR 21 in Blue Eye	—	—	
AR 312	4.9	7.9	AR 18	US 61 near Blytheville	—	—	
AR 312	2.1	3.4	AR 239 in Blytheville	AR 151 in Blytheville	—	—	
AR 312	4.5	7.2	AR 18 near Amorel	AR 150 at Number Nine	—	—	
AR 313	9.0	14.5	AR 53 at Mars Hill	AR 29 in Lewisville	—	—	
AR 314	17.45	28.08	AR 27 in Onyx	AR 7 in Hollis	1963	current	
AR 315	5.10	8.21	AR 359	Lutherville	—	—	
AR 315	0.60	0.97	US 64 at Knoxville	I-40	—	—	
AR 316	23.0	37.0	AR 1/AR 39 at Turner	AR 121 in Rondo	—	—	
AR 317	3.5	5.6	AR 32 at Fomby	Yarborough Landing	—	—	
AR 317	18.1	29.1	White Cliffs Use Area, Millwood Lake	US 71 near Lockesburg	—	—	
AR 318	2.60	4.18	AR 242	AR 20 in Helena	1965	1970	Partially supplanted by US 49
AR 318	4.39	7.07	AR 85 at Oneida	AR 44	1966	current	
AR 318	15.12	24.33	AR 1	AR 20	1973	current	
AR 319	18.01	28.98	AR 38 in Ward	AR 107	1965	current	
AR 319	1.65	2.66	Cadron Settlement Park	US 64 in Conway	1975	current	
AR 320	0.77	1.24	AR 36	Center Hill School	—	—	
AR 321	11.20	18.02	I-57/US 67/US 167/AR 5/AR 367 in Cabot	AR 38	—	—	
AR 321	3.79	6.10	AR 31	AR 267	—	—	
AR 322	3.2	5.1	AR 149 near Marked Tree	AR 118 near Tyronza	—	—	
AR 323	5.7	9.2	End state maintenance at Letchworth	AR 11/AR 38 in Des Arc	—	—	
AR 323	7.4	11.9	AR 11 at Showalters Corner	AR 36 in West Point	—	—	
AR 324	0.76	1.22	US 64 in Russellville	Tyler Road in [Russellville	1986	current	
AR 324	6.85	11.02	AR 105 at Gold Hill	AR 105 in Atkins	1965	current	
AR 324	4.01	6.45	AR 155	AR 10	1973	current	
AR 324	3.73	6.00	Lake Sylvia Recreational Area	AR 9	1973	current	
AR 325	5.00	8.05	US 61 in Osceola	AR 158	—	—	
AR 326	9.96	16.03	AR 7/AR 7T in Russellville	I-40/AR 7 in Russellville	1965	current	
AR 326	1.50	2.41	US 64 in Russellville	AR 124 in Russellville	1965	current	
AR 326	6.52	10.49	AR 124 at Gum Log	AR 105	1973	current	
AR 327	10.97	17.65	Ozark National Forest boundary at Wayton	AR 74 near Jasper	1965	current	
AR 328	18.37	29.56	AR 251	US 62/US 67 in Reyno	1965	current	
AR 328	7.81	12.57	AR 211 in Success	US 67	1973	current	
AR 329	7.8	12.6	AR 24 near Lockesburg	US 70B/AR 41 in De Queen	—	—	
AR 330	4.4	7.1	US 65/AR 9	Choctaw Recreation Area	1958	2013	Former AR 130
AR 330	0.90	1.45	US 65 in Clinton	US 65 in Clinton	1966	1997	
AR 330	4.207	6.771	Van Buren Recreation Area in Fairfield Bay	AR 16	1963	current	
AR 331	5.28	8.50	AR 274 in Pottsville	Bradley Cove Road	1971	current	
AR 332	8.0	12.9	AR 335 in Tollette	US 278 near Yancy	—	—	
AR 332	11.2	18.0	AR 29 in De Ann	US 67 in Prescott	—	—	
AR 333	17.2	27.7	US 64 in London	AR 7 near Dover	—	—	
AR 333	2.6	4.2	Searcy CR 8 near Canaan	US 65 near Marshall	—	—	
AR 333	3.4	5.5	Frost Street in Gilbert	US 65	—	—	
AR 334	5.51	8.87	AR 1B in Forrest City	St. Francis CR 734/CR 735/CR 736 at Tuni	1965	current	
AR 334	3.27	5.26	US 79 in Bledsoe	Lee CR 621	1966	current	
AR 335	17.67	28.44	AR 15 at Newell	US 167 near Norphlet	1965	current	
AR 335	2	3.2	US 82/AR 15 in El Dorado	US 82B/US 167B in El Dorado	1994	1995	
AR 336	5.8	9.3	US 65/AR 9	Greers Ferry Lake	1965	2013	
AR 336	11.155	17.952	AR 9 at Formosa	US 65/AR 9 in Clinton	1966	current	
AR 336	0.876	1.410	AR 16 in Higden	Higden Road in Higden	1972	current	
AR 337	1.4	2.3	AR 92 near Higden	Sugar Loaf Use Area	—	—	
AR 337	7.9	12.7	AR 16 near Pangburn	AR 5/AR 25 in Heber Springs	—	—	
AR 338	8.1	13.0	AR 5 in Little Rock	AR 365 at Sweet Home	—	—	
AR 339	0.7	1.1	Woodruff CR 816	AR 33B in Augusta	—	—	
AR 340	9.1	14.6	AR 279 in Bella Vista	AR 94 in Bella Vista	—	—	
AR 341	26.2	42.2	AR 14 near Big Flat	AR 5/AR 201 near Norfolk	—	—	
AR 341	1.9	3.1	AR 5	Tracy Ferry Road/Rocky Ridge Road	—	—	
AR 342	3.48	5.60	AR 5	Norfork Lake	—	—	
AR 342	0.76	1.22	US 63	Mammoth Spring State Park	—	—	
AR 342	1.55	2.49	Boat launch site on Spring River	US 63/US 412/AR 175	—	—	
AR 343	9.56	15.39	AR 152	US 63/US 79	1965	current	
AR 343	8.59	13.82	US 165	AR 86 near Slovak	1966	current	
AR 343	4.04	6.50	Wheeler Lake Road	AR 11	1966	current	
AR 344	8.08	13.00	US 82	US 371 near Magnolia	1966	current	
AR 344	8.00	12.87	AR 98 at Atlanta	Columbia–Union county line	1973	1978	
AR 345	3.36	5.41	US 62B in Cotter	US 62/US 412 in Gassville	1973	current	
AR 345	0.6	0.97	US 62/US 412 in Gassville	AR 126 in Gassville	1969	2020	
AR 346	3.2	5.1	AR 84	Amity Landing Recreation Area	—	—	
AR 347	6.72	10.81	AR 84	Hot Spring County	—	—	
AR 348	5.56	8.95	AR 59 at Figure Five	AR 60	1966	current	
AR 348	3.61	5.81	US 71 at Cain	Forest Service Road 1117	1973	current	
AR 349	4.45	7.16	AR 226	AR 18/AR 91 near Herman	1966	current	
AR 349	2.44	3.93	AR 230	AR 228	1973	current	
AR 350	8.21	13.21	US 64	AR 1 at Wilkins	1966	current	
AR 351	0.92	1.48	Access Road in Jonesboro	AR 18 in Jonesboro	1966	current	
AR 351	13.87	22.32	Airport Road in Jonesboro	AR 358	1966	current	
AR 352	1.11	1.79	Franklin CR 441	US 64	1973	current	
AR 352	21.43	34.49	US 64 in Clarksville	AR 23	1966	current	
AR 353	1.09	1.75	US 67	Hempstead CR 2/CR 15 at Guernsey	1966	current	
AR 354	9.70	15.61	AR 9 in Oxford	AR 289 in Horseshoe Bend	—	—	
AR 354	12.65	20.36	US 167 in Ash Flat	AR 58	—	—	
AR 355	6.4	10.3	Bois D'Arc Lake	AR 29	—	—	
AR 355	22.2	35.7	AR 29 near Patmos	US 371 near Waldo	—	—	
AR 355	31.8	51.2	US 67 in Fulton	US 278	—	—	
AR 356	11.7	18.8	AR 92 near Bee Branch	AR 25/AR 124 in Quitman	—	—	
AR 357	9.20	14.81	AR 50	US 70	—	—	
AR 358	13.89	22.35	AR 141	AR 69 in Paragould	1967	current	
AR 359	12.9	20.8	US 64 near Knoxville	US 64 in Lamar	—	—	
AR 360	18.8	30.3	AR 160 at Gin City	AR 53	1966	current	
AR 360	3.98	6.41	US 79 in Emerson	Columbia CR 23	1973	1978	
AR 361	8.2	13.2	AR 25 at Saffell	AR 25 at Lynn	—	—	
AR 361	5.4	8.7	AR 117 in Black Rock	AR 166 at Davidsonville Historic State Park	—	—	
AR 362	1.72	2.77	US 49	Louisiana Purchase State Park	1969	current	
AR 363	1.1	1.8	I-40/US 64/AR 247 in Pottsville	End state maintenance near Pottsville	—	—	
AR 363	2.1	3.4	End state maintenance near Atkins	I-40/AR 105 in Atkins	—	—	
AR 364	20.0	32.2	US 49 in Tilton	AR 163 near Birdeye	—	—	
AR 365	69.31	111.54	US 65B/US 79B in Pine Bluff	US 65B/AR 60 in Conway	—	—	Former US 65
AR 366	8.0	12.9	US 49 near Blackton	AR 86 near Holly Grove	—	—	
AR 366	3.2	5.1	AR 33 near Roe	End state maintenance at Aberdeen	—	—	
AR 367	15.0	24.1	US 167 at East End	US 70/AR 365 in Little Rock	—	—	Former US 167
AR 367	81.5	131.2	I-57/US 67/US 167/AR 5/AR 321 in Cabot	US 67B/US 412B/AR 34 in Walnut Ridge	—	—	Longest 3 digit highway in Arkansas; former US 67
AR 368	6.9	11.1	AR 24 near Reader	AR 24 near Reader	—	—	
AR 369	0.749	1.205	AR 27 in Nashville	End state maintenance in Nashville	1980	current	
AR 369	26.174	42.123	AR 26 near Center Point	Albert Pike Recreation Area	1966	current	
AR 369	0.196	0.315	AR 22 in Paris	End state maintenance in Paris	1978	current	
AR 370	2.00	3.22	AR 8	Opal	—	—	
AR 371	5.03	8.10	AR 367 in McRae	AR 267	1970	1994	Renumbered AR 13 due to creation of US 371
AR 371	6.13	9.87	AR 367 in Judsonia	AR 258	1970	1994	Renumbered AR 13 due to creation of US 371
AR 372	2.2	3.5	US 371	AR 299	—	—	
AR 372	1.2	1.9	AR 53	US 371 at Laneburg	—	—	
AR 373	14.3	23.0	AR 163	AR 214	—	—	
AR 374	7.3	11.7	AR 7 near Jasper	AR 74/AR 123 near Vendor	—	—	
AR 374	2.7	4.3	Searcy CR 13 near St. Joe	Searcy CR 28 near St. Joe	—	—	
AR 375	8.1	13.0	US 59/US 71 at Potter Junction	AR 8 in Mena	—	—	
AR 375	8.1	13.0	AR 8 near Mena	Polk CR 630 in the Ouachita National Forest	—	—	
AR 376	17.8	28.6	US 278 near Camden	AR 7 in Louann	—	—	
AR 377	11.2	18.0	AR 16 near Witts Spring	AR 74 in Snowball	—	—	
AR 378	10.0	16.1	US 71	AR 96 in Mansfield	—	—	
AR 379	5.0	8.0	End state maintenance in the Ouachita National Forest	US 270/AR 27 near Mount Ida	—	—	
AR 379	1.0	1.6	Southside Road near Oden	AR 88 in Oden	—	—	
AR 380	—	—	—	—	1966	1979	
AR 380	4.42	7.11	Oklahoma state line	AR 41	1997	current	
AR 380	0.20	0.32	Ogden	US 71	1997	current	
AR 381	12.3	19.8	AR 232	US 70 near Carlisle	—	—	
AR 382	1.03	1.66	Ozark Folk Center	AR 5/AR 9/AR 14	1970	current	
AR 383	—	—	—	—	1966	1971	signage was not changed until 1973/1974
AR 384	9.1	14.6	AR 367 in Newport	AR 18	—	—	
AR 384	2.3	3.7	AR 14/AR 37 near Amagon	Jackson CR 108 in Balch	—	—	
AR 385	9.0	14.5	AR 11 in Griffithville	AR 36 in Kensett	—	—	
AR 385	6.2	10.0	AR 367 in Judsonia	AR 157 in Plainview	—	—	
AR 386	1.35	2.17	AR 365 in Wrightsville	Wrightsville Unit	—	—	
AR 386	1.25	2.01	Toltec Mounds Archeological State Park	US 165	—	—	
AR 387	6.5	10.5	AR 24/AR 299 in Bluff City	AR 57/AR 76 near Chidester	—	—	
AR 387	1.9	3.1	AR 376 in Camden	Ouachita CR 47 near Camden	—	—	
AR 388	2.39	3.85	US 65	Arkansas State Penitentiary	1956	current	numbered 1968
AR 389	—	—	—	—	1966	1993	
AR 390	1.86	2.99	DeGray Lake	AR 7	1968	current	
AR 391	4.51	2.80	I-40 in Galloway	US 165 near North Little Rock	—	—	
AR 392	0.22	0.35	US 67 near Gurdon	End state maintenance	1968	1977	
AR 392	10.44	16.80	US 62/US 412 at Little Arkansaw	AR 7 in Harrison	1990	current	
AR 393	2.57	4.14	near Six Mile Park	AR 109	1994	current	
AR 393	1.86	2.99	AR 22	Delaware Park, Lake Dardanelle	1970	current	
AR 393	0.67	1.08	AR 197	Pleasant Hill	1990	current	
AR 394	7.7	12.4	AR 69 in Batesville	AR 69 near Magness	—	—	
AR 394	1.5	2.4	AR 233 in Batesville	US 167 north of Batesville	—	—	
AR 395	3.0	4.8	Byron Road near Salem	US 62/US 412 in Salem	—	—	
AR 395	10.4	16.7	AR 9 in Salem	Route 17 at the Missouri state line	—	—	
AR 396	2.6	4.2	Ursey Road	US 65 near Burlington	1973	2016	
AR 397	2.023	3.256	AR 43 at Grubb Springs	Industrial Park Road in Harrison	1973	current	
AR 397	1.2	1.9	US 65 in Omaha	Route JJ at the Missouri state line	1973	1980	
AR 398	2.5	4.0	AR 41	Franklin CR 62	—	—	
AR 398	1.1	1.8	AR 23 in Caulksville	AR 22 in Ratcliff	—	—	
AR 399	0.6	0.97	US 70B in De Queen	US 70 in De Queen	—	—	
AR 400	2.1	3.4	US 71 near Chester	Lake Fort Smith State Park	—	—	
AR 440	3.9	6.3	I-40/I-440 in North Little Rock	US 67/US 167 in Jacksonville	2003	2024	Replaced by I-440
AR 463	20.59	33.14	AR 14	I-555/US 63B in Jonesboro	—	—	Former US 63
AR 471	—	—	US 71 in Fayetteville	US 62/US 71 in Rogers	1984	1987	
AR 530	23.0	37.0	AR 11 near Star City	I-530/US 63/US 65/US 79 near Pine Bluff	2013	current	
AR 530	4.5	7.2	AR 35	US 278 near Wilmar	—	—	Temporary designation of future I-530
AR 540	—	—	—	—	1969	1979	Redesignated as I-540
AR 540	—	—	—	—	1995	1998	Redesignated as I-540
AR 549	29.49	47.46	Future I-49	AR 245 in Texarkana	2004	current	Temporary designation of future I-49
AR 612	4.8	7.7	AR 112 in Springdale	I-49/US 62/US 71 in Springdale	2018	2026	Redesignated as I-42 in September 2026
AR 642	3.6	5.8	I-42 near Elm Springs	AR 264 near Northwest Arkansas National Airport	2026	current	Connector between AR 612 and XNA Airport near Springdale; opened September 4, 2026
AR 657	—	—	US 62/US 67 near Corning	US 67 near Corning	proposed	—	Future designation for the Corning Bypass of I-57
Former

== Institutional routes ==
Number	Length (mi)	Length (km)	Southern or western terminus	Northern or eastern terminus	Formed	Removed	Notes
AR 600	73.17	117.76	State Park roads		—	—	
AR 801	—	—	Arkansas Forestry Commission & Arkansas Geological Survey, Pulaski; former Arkansas State Police, Little Rock		—	—	
AR 802	—	—	Arkansas State Police		—	—	
AR 803	—	—	Arkansas State Police, Clarksville		—	1998	
AR 804	—	—	Arkansas State Police, Hope		—	1981	
AR 805	—	—	Arkansas State Police, Warren, North Arkansas College		—	—	
AR 806	—	—	Arkansas State Police, Forrest City		—	—	section around old facility removed 1998
AR 807	—	—	Arkansas State Police		—	—	
AR 808	—	—	Arkansas State Police, Madison		—	1998	
AR 809	—	—	Arkansas State Capitol, Pulaski		—	—	
AR 810	1.22	1.96	McClellan Drive & Arkansas Services Center entry, Jonesboro		—	2012	
AR 811	0.60	0.97	UA Soil Testing and Research Laboratory roads, Lee Co.		—	—	
AR 812	1.86	2.99	Washington Co. Fairgrounds/UA–F Ag Station roads		1972	current	
AR 813	0.88	1.42	UA Livestock and Forestry Research Station road, Independence Co.		—	—	
AR 814	0.50	0.80	Southwest Research and Extension Center roads, Hempstead Co.		—	—	
AR 815	1.22	1.96	UA Rice Research and Extension Center roads, Arkansas Co.		1975	current	
AR 816	0.32	0.51	UA Delta Branch Experiment Station road, Crittenden Co.		1980	current	
AR 817	0.87	1.40	UA Northeast Research and Extension Center road, Mississippi Co.		1965	current	
AR 818	3.92	6.31	UA Fruit Research Station roads, Johnson Co.		1987	current	Signed
AR 819	—	—	Joe Hogan State Fish Hatchery, Lonoke Co.		1957	1982	
AR 819	3.50	5.63	UA Vegetable Research Station road, Crawford Co.		1987	current	
AR 820	—	—	Newport Extension Center, Jackson Co.		—	1992	
AR 821	—	—	Phillips Community College		—	—	
AR 822	—	—	—	—	—	—	
AR 823	—	—	Southeast Research and Extension Center		—	—	
AR 824	—	—	Pine Tree Research Experiment Station		—	—	
AR 825	—	—	Arkansas Governor's Mansion		—	—	
AR 830	—	—	Arkansas State Highway and Transportation Department		—	—	
AR 831	—	—	Cummins Unit		—	—	
AR 832	—	—	Tucker Unit		—	—	
AR 833	—	—	Southeast Arkansas Community Correction Center, Pine Bluff Unit, Diagnostic Unit		—	—	
AR 834	—	—	Wrightsville Unit, Delta Regional Unit, North Central Unit		—	—	
AR 835	—	—	Arkansas Juvenile Assessment and Treatment Center		—	—	
AR 836	—	—	Fargo Agricultural School		—	1980	
AR 840	—	—	Fargo Agricultural School		—	1980	
AR 841	—	—	University of Arkansas for Medical Sciences, Arkansas State Hospital, War Memorial Stadium		—	—	
AR 842	—	—	Arkansas Health Center		—	—	
AR 843	—	—	Booneville Human Development Center		—	—	
AR 844	—	—	—	—	—	—	
AR 845	—	—	Alexander Human Development Center		—	2011	
AR 846	—	—	Arkansas Department of Health		1972	current	
AR 846	—	—	Arkansas Department of Health		1976	—	
AR 846	—	—	Hope Migrant Farm Labor Center		1999	—	
AR 851	—	—	Lake Catherine State Park		—	—	
AR 852	—	—	Arkansas Post State Park		—	—	
AR 853	—	—	Crowley's Ridge State Park		—	—	
AR 854	—	—	Buffalo River State Park		—	—	
AR 855	—	—	Petit Jean State Park		—	—	
AR 856	—	—	Mount Nebo State Park		—	—	
AR 857	—	—	—	—	—	—	
AR 858	—	—	Daisy State Park		—	—	
AR 859	—	—	—	—	—	—	
AR 860	—	—	—	—	—	—	
AR 861	—	—	—	—	—	—	
AR 862	—	—	Devil's Den State Park		—	—	
AR 871	5.33	8.58	University of Arkansas at Monticello campus roads		—	—	
AR 872	3.66	5.89	Arkansas Tech University campus roads		—	—	
AR 873	5.34	8.59	University of Arkansas campus roads		—	—	
AR 873	0.27	0.43	University of Arkansas at Little Rock campus roads		—	—	
AR 874	1.42	2.29	Henderson State University campus roads		—	—	
AR 875	2.33	3.75	Southern Arkansas University campus roads		—	—	
AR 876	2.04	3.28	University of Central Arkansas campus roads		—	—	
AR 877	8.56	13.78	Arkansas State University campus roads		—	—	
AR 878	1.27	2.04	University of Arkansas at Pine Bluff campus roads		—	—	
AR 879	—	—	Arkansas School for the Deaf		—	—	
AR 880	—	—	Arkansas School for the Blind		—	—	
AR 881	—	—	State Vocational School (Huntsville)		—	1998	
AR 882	—	—	State Vocational School (Clinton)		—	2007	
AR 883	—	—	Arkansas State University-Beebe		—	—	
AR 884	—	—	Southeast Arkansas College		—	—	
AR 885	—	—	Arkansas State Veterans Home		—	—	decommissioned from closure of old location to opening of new location
AR 886	—	—	Conway Human Development Center, Jonesboro Human Development Center		—	—	
AR 887	—	—	Arkansas Career Training Institute, National Park Community College		—	—	
AR 888	—	—	University of Arkansas Community College at Morrilton		—	—	
AR 889	—	—	Arkansas State University-Searcy		—	—	
AR 890	—	—	Various buildings		—	—	
AR 902	3.0	4.8	Wilson Brake in Portland		—	—	Signed
AR 904	—	—	C. B. "Charlie" Craig State Hatchery		—	2004	
AR 912	—	—	Lobo Landing		—	1980	became part of AR 337
AR 915	1.0	1.6	Access to Lake Overcup		—	—	Signed
AR 917-1	1.7	2.7	Vine Prairie Park in Mulberry		—	2026	Signed, Decommissioned in 2026
AR 922	2.7	4.3	Lake Wallace access south of Dermott		—	—	Signed
AR 924	4.3	6.9	US 64 in Altus	West Creek Public Use Area	1973	1998	Partially renumbered AR 179
AR 926	6.2	10.0	US 270	Brady Mountain	—	—	Signed
AR 932	0.8	1.3	White River access near Oil Trough Black River access near Cord		—	2004	Former portions of AR 37 and AR 122
AR 933	0.3	0.48	White River and Sylamore Creek access near Allison		—	—	Signed, Former portion of AR 9
AR 934	—	—	Black River access near Elgin		—	1985	Former portion of AR 37
AR 935	0.1	0.16	Lake Saracen access at Pine Bluff		—	—	Unsigned
AR 942	2.2	3.5	—	—	1970	—	Unsigned route located in Logan County
AR 943	0.3	0.48	Joe Hogan State Fish Hatchery at Lonoke		1982	current	Unsigned, Renumbered from AR 819
AR 946	0.6	0.97	Red River access at Doddridge		1995	current	Signed, Former portion of AR 160
AR 947	—	—	Mississippi River levee access at Luxora		—	—	Unsigned
AR 949-2	0.7	1.1	Signed, Denby Point Use Area at Lake Ouachita near Joplin		—	—	Signed
AR 949-3	2.1	3.4	Tompkins Bend near Lake Ouachita		—	—	Signed
AR 949-4	1.9	3.1	Primary access to Lake Ouachita		—	—	Signed
AR 956	2.8	4.5	Lake Hogue Access Area north of Waldenburg		—	—	Signed
AR 956-1	—	—	Lake Hogue Access Area north of Waldenburg		—	—	Signed
AR 959	0.5	0.80	Lake Des Arc access near Des Arc		—	—	Unsigned
AR 980	35.41	56.99	Airport Roads		—	—	
Former

== See also ==
- 1926 Arkansas state highway numbering

== Sources ==
- "Minutes of the Meeting of the Arkansas State Highway Commission" (PDF). Little Rock: Arkansas State Highway Commission. 1953–1969. OCLC 21798861. Archived from the original (PDF) on October 1, 2018.
- "Minutes of the Meeting of the Arkansas State Highway Commission" (PDF). Little Rock: Arkansas State Highway Commission. 1970–1979. OCLC 21798861.
- "Minutes of the Meeting of the Arkansas State Highway Commission" (PDF). Little Rock: Arkansas State Highway Commission. 1980–1989. OCLC 21798861.
- "Minutes of the Meeting of the Arkansas State Highway Commission" (PDF). Little Rock: Arkansas State Highway Commission. 1990–1999. OCLC 21798861. Archived from the original (PDF) on July 21, 2019.
- "Minutes of the Meeting of the Arkansas State Highway Commission" (PDF). Little Rock: Arkansas State Highway Commission. 2000–2009. OCLC 21798861.
- "Minutes of the Meeting of the Arkansas State Highway Commission" (PDF). Little Rock: Arkansas State Highway Commission. 2010–2019. OCLC 21798861.
