= Arkansas Highway 208 =

Highway 208
- AR 208 highlighted in red

Route information
- Maintained by ArDOT

Section 1
- Length: 8.3 mi (13.4 km)
- East end: End of state maintenance near Dewey
- West end: AR 35 / AR 159 at Halley

Section 2
- Length: 7.3 mi (11.7 km)
- East end: US 65 / US 278 at Bellaire
- West end: US 165 in Dermott

Location
- Country: United States
- State: Arkansas
- Counties: Chicot, Desha

Highway system
- Arkansas Highway System; Interstate; US; State; Business; Spurs; Suffixed; Scenic; Heritage
← AR 207	→ AR 209

Arkansas Highway 208 (AR 208, Ark. 208, and Hwy. 208) is the designation for a state highway in the U.S. state of Arkansas. The route is split into two sections, both of which are located in southeastern Arkansas. The first section begins near the Mississippi River at the unincorporated community of Dewey, and ends at AR 35/AR 159 at the unincorporated community of Halley. The second section begins at US 65/US 278 at the unincorporated community of Bellaire, and ends at US 165 in Dermott. Both sections are maintained by the Arkansas Department of Transportation (ARDOT).

== Route description ==
=== Section 1 ===
The first section of AR 208 begins at the unincorporated community of Dewey near the Mississippi River. From there, it heads in a more northeasterly direction for about 8.3 miles (13.4 km) through rural Chicot and Desha Counties before intersecting AR 35/AR 159 at the unincorporated community of Halley. This section of the route is a former section of AR 35, and the current routing of AR 35 east of Halley is a former routing of AR 208. This section of the route does not intersect any other highways or communities throughout its entire length.

=== Section 2 ===
The second section of AR 208 begins at US 65/US 278 at the unincorporated community of Bellaire. The route travels west for about 6.5 miles (10.5 km) before its first intersection with US 165 in Dermott. It then travels into the city, along neighborhood streets before intersecting US 165 a second time at its western terminus. The route is about 7.3 miles (11.7 km) long.

== Major intersections ==
County	Location	mi	km	Destinations	Notes
Chicot	Dewey	0.0	0.0	End of state maintenance at Dewey	Eastern terminus
Desha	Halley	8.3	13.4	AR 35 / AR 159 north – McGehee, Port of Yellow Bend	Western terminus
Gap in route
Chicot	Bellaire	0.0	0.0	US 65 / US 278 – McGehee, Lake Village	Eastern terminus
Chicot		2.9	4.7	AR 293 south	Northern terminus of AR 293
Chicot	Dermott	5.5	8.9	US 165 – Montrose, Portland	
Chicot	Dermott	7.3	11.7	US 165 – McGehee	Northern terminus, also intersects unsigned AR 834.
1.000 mi = 1.609 km; 1.000 km = 0.621 mi
