= Arkansas Highway 203 =

State highway designation in Arkansas, United States

Highway 203

Route information
- Maintained by ArDOT

Section 1
- Length: 20.22 mi (32.54 km)
- South end: US 278 in Hampton
- North end: AR 274 east of East Camden

Section 2
- Length: 8.07 mi (12.99 km)
- South end: US 79B in Bearden
- North end: AR 9 south of Holly Springs

Location
- Country: United States
- State: Arkansas
- Counties: Calhoun, Ouachita

Highway system
- Arkansas Highway System; Interstate; US; State; Business; Spurs; Suffixed; Scenic; Heritage
| ← AR 202 | → AR 204 |

Arkansas Highway 203 (AR 203, Ark. 203, and Hwy. 203) is the designation for a state highway in the U.S. state of Arkansas. The route is split into two sections, both of which are located in southern Arkansas. The first section begins at US 278 in Hampton, Arkansas and ends at AR 274 east of East Camden. The second section begins at US 79B in Bearden and ends at AR 9 south of Holly Springs. Both sections are maintained by the Arkansas Department of Transportation (ARDOT).

== Route description ==
=== Section 1 ===
The first section of AR 203 begins at US 278 in Hampton, Arkansas. The route travels northwest for about 7 miles (11 km) before intersecting AR 274 northwest of Woodberry where it will share a concurrency for about 4 miles (6.4 km) west. From there, AR 203 splits off and turns a more northerly direction and travels around the perimeter of the Shumaker Naval Ammunition Depot. The route then intersects AR 205 in northwestern Calhoun county before reaching its northern terminus at AR 274 just east of East Camden near the campus of Southern Arkansas University Tech. The route is about 20.21 miles (32.52 km) long.

=== Section 2 ===
The second section of AR 203 begins at US 79 Business in Bearden, Arkansas. The route intersects US 79 almost immediately after its southern terminus, then travels in a relatively northwest direction for about 8 miles (13 km) before reaching its northern terminus at AR 9 just south of Holly Springs. The route is about 8.07 miles (12.99 km)

== Major intersections ==
| County | Location | mi | km | Destinations | Notes |
|---|---|---|---|---|---|
| Calhoun | Hampton | 0.0 | 0.0 | US 278 – Hampton, Warren | Southern terminus |
| Calhoun | | 7.4 | 11.9 | AR 274 east to US 167 | Eastern end of AR 274 concurrency |
| Calhoun | | 12.2 | 19.6 | AR 274 east | Western end of AR 274 concurrency |
| Ouachita | No major junctions | | | | |
| Calhoun | | 18.8 | 30.3 | AR 205 to US 79 | |
| Calhoun | | 20.2 | 32.5 | AR 274 – East Camden | Northern terminus |
Gap in route
| Ouachita | Bearden | 0.0 | 0.0 | US 79B – Bearden | Southern terminus |
| Ouachita | Bearden | 1.0 | 1.6 | US 79 – Camden, Fordyce | |
| Ouachita | | 8.1 | 13.0 | AR 9 – Princeton | Northern terminus |
1.000 mi = 1.609 km; 1.000 km = 0.621 mi
