= Arkansas Highway 180 =

State highway in Arkansas, United States

Highway 180
- Martin Luther King, Jr. Boulevard
- AR 180 highlighted in red; former AR 180 in gray

Route information
- Maintained by ArDOT
- Length: 1.723 mi (2.773 km)
- Existed: 2008–present

Major junctions
- West end: I-49 / US 62 / US 71 in Fayetteville
- East end: School Avenue in Fayetteville

Location
- Country: United States
- State: Arkansas
- Counties: Washington

Highway system
- Arkansas Highway System; Interstate; US; State; Business; Spurs; Suffixed; Scenic; Heritage
← AR 179	→ AR 181

Arkansas Highway 180 (AR 180) is a state highway in Fayetteville, Arkansas. The route, officially known as Martin Luther King Jr. Boulevard, runs 1.723 miles (2.773 km) from Interstate 49 (I-49) east to School Avenue. Highway 180 is designated as part of the Trail of Tears National Historic Trail as well as Arkansas Heritage Trails System designations as the Butterfield Trail, Trail of Tears (Benge Route), and Civil War Trails (Herron's Approach).

== Route description ==
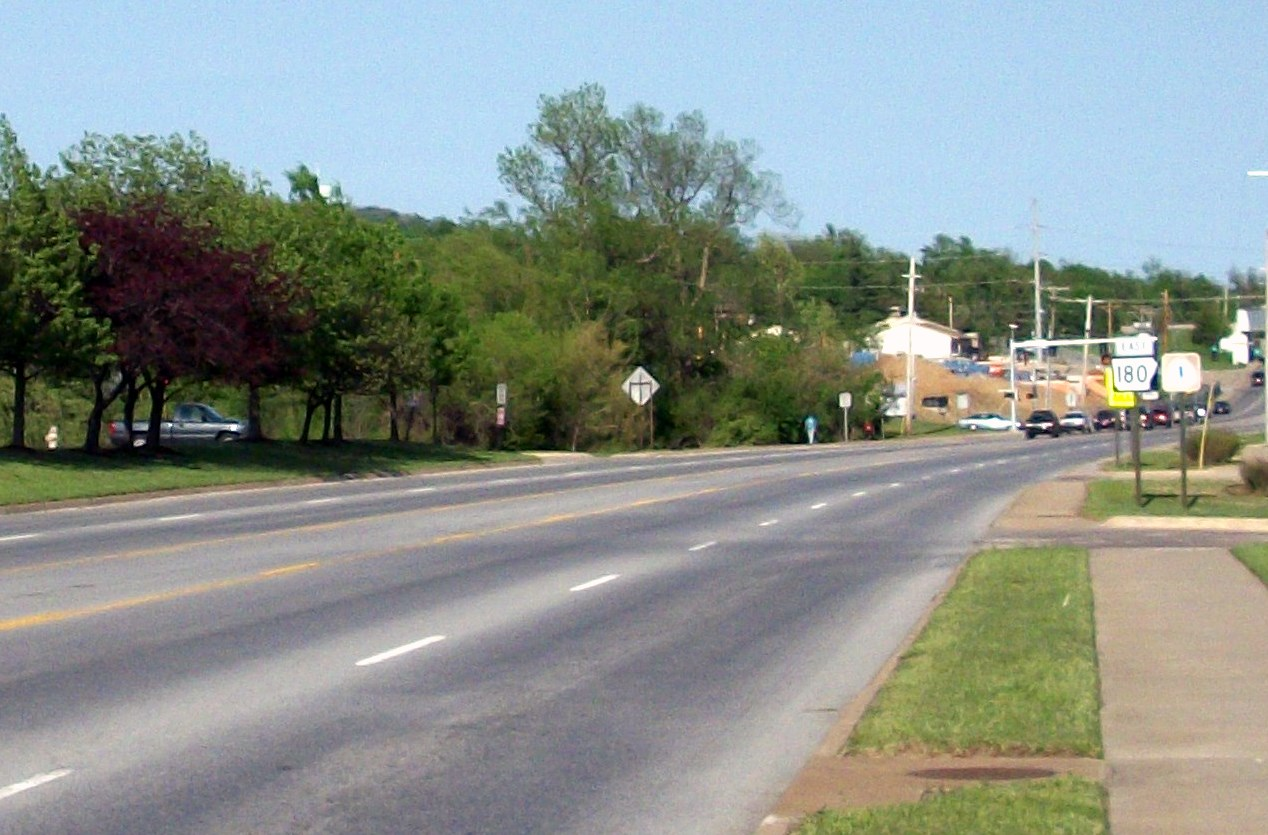
First reassurance marker east of the Razorback Road junction

Highway 180 begins at US 62 just underneath the I-49/US 62/US 71 overpass in western Fayetteville. It continues east to a junction with Razorback Road (former Highway 112) on the Campus of the University of Arkansas. Highway 180 continues east past the University of Arkansas, Fayetteville High School, and the Fayetteville National Cemetery to terminate at School Avenue (former US 71B). The roadway continues east as Martin Luther King Jr. Boulevard, a city street. The route is entirely four lane, with a center left-turn lane.

== History ==
As early as 1930, the road was named Wall Street in the city limits of Fayetteville. The road later became 6th Street. Between 1971 and 1989 this road was designated US 62 Business.

On January 15, 2009, Fayetteville renamed Sixth Street to Martin Luther King Jr. Boulevard. The ceremony took place at the Razorback Road intersection at the entrance to the University of Arkansas. Most Fayetteville businesses on the road still claim 6th Street, and many residents and university students continue to call the road 6th Street over two years after the change.

== Major intersections ==
The entire route is in Fayetteville, Washington County.

mi	km	Destinations	Notes
0.000	0.000	I-49 (US 71 / Fulbright Expressway) / US 62 (Martin Luther King Jr. Boulevard) – Springdale, Fort Smith, Prairie Grove	Western terminus
0.76	1.22	Razorback Road – University of Arkansas	Former AR 112
1.723	2.773	School Avenue	Eastern terminus; former US 71B
1.000 mi = 1.609 km; 1.000 km = 0.621 mi

== Former routes ==
Highway 180
- Location: Fayetteville, Arkansas
- Length: 1.5 mi (2.4 km)
- Existed: c. 1940–1990s

Arkansas Highway 180 (AR 180) was a state highway of 1.5 miles (2.4 km) in Fayetteville. Its original location was along Assembly Road and Skyline Drive where it circled around Mount Sequoyah and returned to its single terminus of Highway 45. This segment was dropped from the state highway system in the early 1990s.

Highway 180
- Location: Fayetteville, Arkansas
- Length: 1.8 mi (2.9 km)
- Existed: c. 1940–2008

Arkansas Highway 180 (AR 180) was a state highway of 1.8 miles (2.9 km) in Fayetteville. The route began at US 71B in Fayetteville and followed Township Road, Gregg Avenue and Drake Street before ending at Highway 112. In the 1990s this segment was extended north along Gregg Avenue and ended at the Fulbright Expressway on the north end of Fayetteville. This segment was dropped from the state highway system in 2008 following the widening of Gregg Avenue.
