= Arkansas Highway 204 =

State highway in Arkansas, United States

Highway 204
- Airport Rd
- Final routing of AR 204 before its decommission highlighted in red

Route information
- Maintained by AHTD
- Existed: July 10, 1975–April 22, 2015

Section 1
- Length: 0.35 mi (560 m)
- West end: Airport Road in Bentonville
- East end: US 71B in Bentonville

Section 2
- Length: 2.50 mi (4.02 km)
- West end: AR 43
- East end: AR 59

Section 3
- Length: 2.50 mi (4.02 km)
- West end: AR 12
- East end: AR 59 in Gentry

Location
- Country: United States
- State: Arkansas
- Counties: Benton

Highway system
- Arkansas Highway System; Interstate; US; State; Business; Spurs; Suffixed; Scenic; Heritage
← AR 203	→ AR 205

Highway 204 (AR 204, Ark. 204, and Hwy. 204) is a designation for three former east–west state highway in Benton County, Arkansas. The route of 0.35 miles (0.56 km) ran from Bentonville Municipal Airport west to US 71B in Bentonville.

== Route description ==
=== Siloam Springs ===
Its western terminus was AR 43 and its eastern terminus was AR 59 approximately one mile north of U.S. Route 412.

=== Bentonville ===
The route began at the Bentonville Municipal Airport and runs west to terminate at US 71B (Walton Blvd). The route was two-lane, undivided its entire length. A 2010 study of average daily traffic determined that Highway 204 served 3000 vehicles per day. Bentonville Municipal Airport serves as a general use airport, supersceeded within Northwest Arkansas by Northwest Arkansas National Airport (XNA).

== Major intersections ==
The entire route was in Bentonville, Benton County.

mi	km	Destinations	Notes
0.00	0.00	Bentonville Municipal Airport	western terminus
0.35	0.56	US 71B (Walton Blvd)	eastern terminus
1.000 mi = 1.609 km; 1.000 km = 0.621 mi

== History ==
The first section of Highway 204 was created between Highway 99 and Highway 59 in Siloam Springs on July 10, 1957. A spur route was created north of Siloam Springs to an industrial facility on April 24, 1974. On March 25, 1975, a second section between US 71 and the Bentonville Airport was added to the state highway system. A third section of Highway 204 was created in Gentry on January 30, 1980. The Gentry route was renumbered Highway 59 Spur on January 26, 1994, due to road user confusion with the Siloam Springs route. The Siloam Springs main section and spur were deleted on July 17, 1996, replaced by Highway 43 and Highway 264, respectively. The remaining highway in Bentonville was decommissioned at the request of the City of Bentonville on April 22, 2015, becoming a city street.

=== Siloam Springs spur ===
Lincoln Street
- Location: Siloam Springs
- Length: 0.75 mi (1,210 m)
- Existed: April 24, 1974–July 17, 1996

Highway 204 Spur (AR 204S, Ark. 204S, Hwy. 204S, and Lincoln Street) was a 0.75-mile-long (1.21 km) roadway just north of Siloam Springs. Its western terminus was AR 43 and its eastern terminus was AR 59 approximately one mile north of U.S. Route 412. In the mid-1990s Highway 204 was redesignated as an extension of Highway 264.
