= Arkansas Highway 202 =

State highway in Arkansas, United States

Highway 202

Route information
- Maintained by ArDOT
- Existed: July 10, 1957–present

Section 1
- Length: 7.38 mi (11.88 km)
- West end: US 62 / US 412
- East end: AR 178, Flippin

Section 2
- Length: 9.63 mi (15.50 km)
- West end: Bull Shoals Lake, Oakland Use Area
- East end: AR 5

Location
- Country: United States
- State: Arkansas
- Counties: Marion, Baxter

Highway system
- Arkansas Highway System; Interstate; US; State; Business; Spurs; Suffixed; Scenic; Heritage
← AR 201	→ AR 203

Arkansas Highway 202 (AR 202 and Hwy. 202) is a designation for two east–west state highway in Arkansas. One segment runs 7.38 miles (11.88 km) from US 62/US 412 in Yellville east to Highway 178. A second portion runs 9.63 miles (15.50 km) from Bull Shoals Lake east to Arkansas Highway 5 in Baxter County. Both routes are maintained by the Arkansas State Highway and Transportation Department (AHTD).

== Route description ==
=== Yellville to Flippin ===
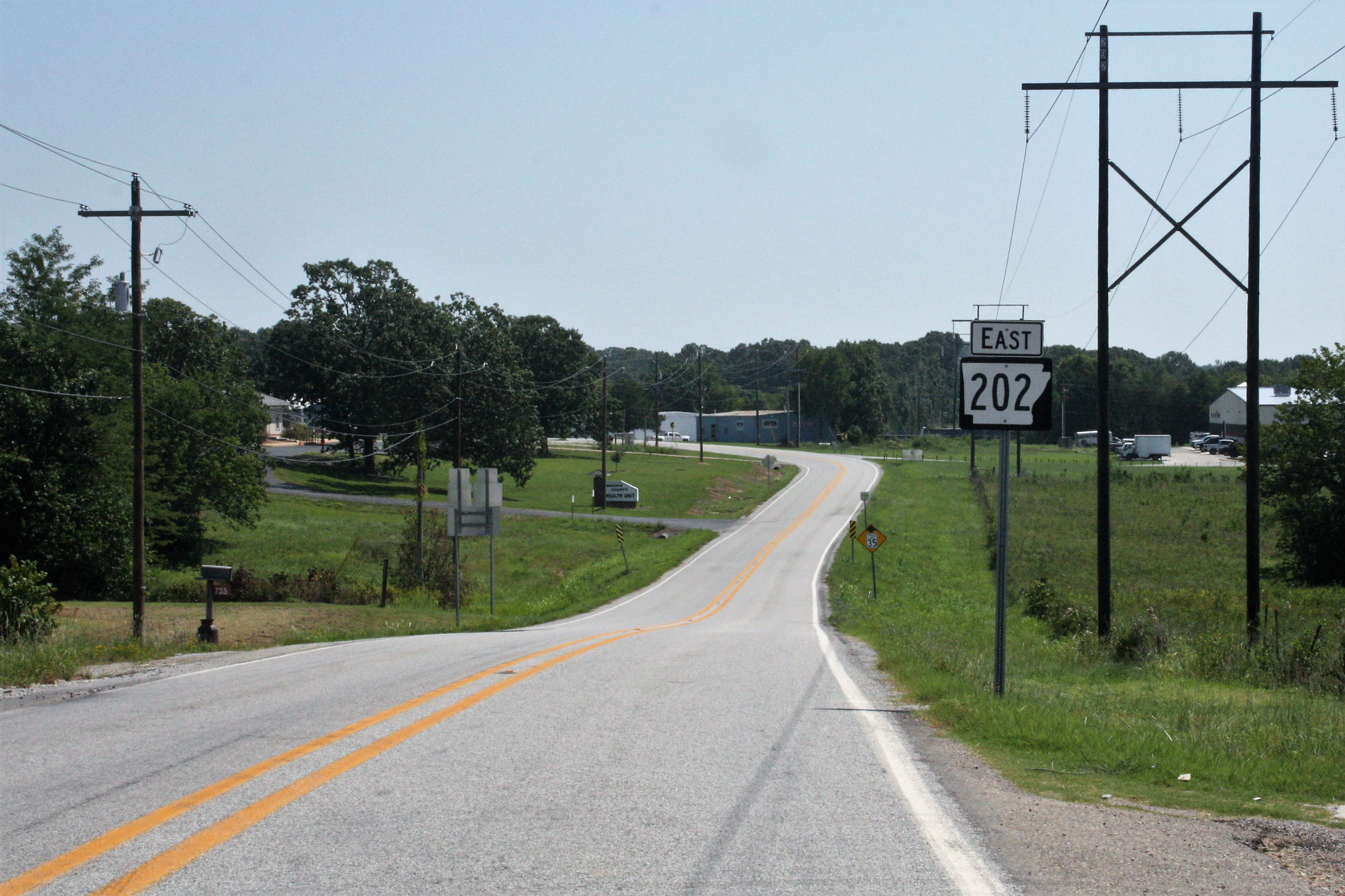
First reassurance marker north of the US 62/US 412 junction in Yellville

The route begins at US 62/US 412 in Yellville and runs east to AR 14 in Summit. The route continues east to AR 178 in Flippin, where it terminates. Highway 202 is entirely two–lane, undivided.

=== Bull Shoals Lake to Highway 5 ===
Highway 202 begins at County Route 141 at the Oakland Use Area near Bull Shoals Lake and runs east. After serving the unincorporated community of Oakland, the highway enters Baxter County to terminate at Highway 5. The route is a low traffic route, with under 700 vehicles per day along its length as of 2010.

== History ==
The Arkansas State Highway Commission designated Highway 202 between Bull Shoals and Highway 5 on July 10, 1957. A second segment was created in Marion County in May 1973, but was removed in a trade for the Yellville to Flippin segment in August 1975.

== Major intersections ==
County	Location	mi	km	Destinations	Notes
Marion	Yellville	0.00	0.00	US 62 / US 412 – Yellville, Harrison	Western terminus
Marion	Summit	1.17	1.88	AR 14 (Main Street)	
Marion	Flippin	7.38	11.88	AR 178 (1st Street) – Bull Shoals, Flippin	Eastern terminus
Marion	Gap in route				
Marion	Bull Shoals Lake	0.00	0.00	CR 141, Oakland Use Area	Western terminus
Baxter		9.63	15.50	AR 5 – Gainesville MO, Mountain Home	Eastern terminus
1.000 mi = 1.609 km; 1.000 km = 0.621 mi

== Former route ==
Highway 202
- Location: Lakeway
- Length: 3.00 mi (4.83 km)
- Existed: May 23, 1973–August 27, 1975

Highway 202 (AR 202, Ark. 202, and Hwy. 202) is a former state highway of 3.00 miles (4.83 km) in Marion County.

=== Route description ===
The route began at Highway 14 in Lakeway and ran east. State maintenance ended, with the route continuing east as a county road.

=== History ===
A second segment of Highway 202 was created near Lakeway on May 23, 1973 pursuant to Act 9 of 1973 by the Arkansas General Assembly. The act directed county judges and legislators to designate up to 12 miles (19 km) of county roads as state highways in each county. The Marion County Judge requested this segment and a former segment of Highway 235 to be deleted in exchange for adding the route between Yellville and Flippin. This designation change was approved on August 26, 1975.

=== Major intersections ===
The entire route was in Marion County.

Location	mi	km	Destinations	Notes
Lakeway	0.00	0.00	AR 14 – Lead Hill, Yellville	Western terminus
	3.00	4.83	End state maintenance	Eastern terminus
1.000 mi = 1.609 km; 1.000 km = 0.621 mi

== See also ==
- List of state highways in Arkansas
