= Arkansas Highway 99 =

State highway in Arkansas, United States

Highway 99

Route information
- Maintained by AHTD, Oklahoma Department of Highways
- Existed: April 1, 1926–October 27, 1971

Major junctions
- South end: AR 68 in Siloam Springs
- North end: Route 43 at the Missouri state line (concurrent with OK 20)

Location
- Country: United States
- State: Arkansas
- Counties: Washington, Benton

Highway system
- Arkansas Highway System; Interstate; US; State; Business; Spurs; Suffixed; Scenic; Heritage
← AR 98	→ AR 100

Highway 99 (originally State Road 99, abbreviated AR 99 and Hwy. 99) is a former north–south state highway in Arkansas. Created in 1926, the route connected several small communities in the northwest corner of the state near the Oklahoma border. The highway briefly overlapped with Oklahoma State Highway 20 (SH-20) along the state line, and the two routes briefly enter Oklahoma together. It was significantly shortened in the 1930s, and fully replaced by the Highway 43 designation in 1971. The route was maintained by the Arkansas State Highway and Transportation Department (AHTD), except where the designation entered Oklahoma, where it was maintained by the Oklahoma Department of Highways.

== History ==

State Road 99 was created by the 1926 Arkansas state highway numbering. The initial route started at State Road 80 near Summers and ran north to State Road 102 at Maysville. In 1928, the route was extended south to State Road 45 near Dutch Mills. The following year, the segment between Siloam Springs and Maysville was not included on the state highway map, making State Road 68 the northern terminus. By May 1935, the segment between Summers and Dutch Mills became State Road 59, leaving only the segment between Summers and Siloam Springs. On the 1936 map, even the Summers to Siloam Springs segment has been renumbered State Road 59, deleting the entire route. However, the State Road 99 designation returned the following year, now between Siloam Springs and Missouri.

Following the restoration of the designation in 1937, State Road 99 remained unchanged for many years. A minor extension took place following rerouting of Highway 68 in Siloam Springs on November 8, 1961. In 1971, the Siloam Springs Chamber of Commerce and local leaders sought a unified route number to simplify travel between Siloam Springs and Joplin, Missouri. The Arkansas State Highway Commission authorized a renumbering to Highway 43 to match the Missouri designation on October 27, 1971.

== Major intersections ==
State	County	Location	mi	km	Destinations	Notes
Arkansas	Benton	Siloam Springs	0	0.0	AR 68 – Tulsa, Springdale	Southern terminus
Arkansas	Benton	Siloam Springs	1	1.6	AR 68B east	
Arkansas	Benton	Siloam Springs	2	3.2	AR 204 east	
Arkansas	Benton		9	14	AR 12 – Gentry, Colcord, OK	
Arkansas	Benton	Maysville	20	32	AR 72 east – Gravette	
Oklahoma–Arkansas line	Delaware–Benton county line		22	35	SH-20 west	Begin two-state concurrency
Arkansas	Benton		32	51	SH-20 ends Route 43 north – Southwest City	Eastern end of OK 20 concurrency Continuation into Missouri
1.000 mi = 1.609 km; 1.000 km = 0.621 mi: Concurrency terminus
