= Arkansas Highway 188 =

Highway 188
- AR 188 highlighted in red

Route information
- Maintained by ArDOT
- Length: 8.124 mi (13.074 km)
- Existed: June 23, 1965–present

Major junctions
- West end: AR 27
- East end: Little Fir Use Area

Location
- Country: United States
- State: Arkansas
- Counties: Montgomery

Highway system
- Arkansas Highway System; Interstate; US; State; Business; Spurs; Suffixed; Scenic; Heritage
← AR 187	→ AR 189

Highway 188 (AR 188) is an east–west state highway in the U.S. state of Arkansas. The route is located in Montgomery County within the Ouachita Mountains, and provides access from AR 27 to Little Fir Use Area along Lake Ouachita. The route was created in 1965 and is maintained by the Arkansas Department of Transportation (ArDOT).

== Route description ==
AR 188 begins at AR 27, about 5 miles (8.0 km) northeast of Mount Ida. The route travels east through the Ouachita National Forest before reaching the Little Fir Public Use Area along the west side of Lake Ouachita. The route is 8.11 miles (13.05 km) long and does not intersect any other highways or enter any communities.

The ArDOT maintains AR 188 like all other parts of the state highway system. As a part of these responsibilities, the department tracks the volume of traffic using its roads in surveys using a metric called average annual daily traffic (AADT). ArDOT estimates the traffic level for a segment of roadway for any average day of the year in these surveys. As of 2024, AADT was estimated at 180 vehicles per day. For reference, roads under 400 VPD are classified as "very low volume local road" by the American Association of State Highway and Transportation Officials (AASHTO).

No segment of AR 188 is listed as part of the National Highway System, a network of roads important to the nation's economy, defense, and mobility.

== History ==
The Arkansas State Highway Commission created the highway along a former county road on June 23, 1965 as part of a statewide highway system expansion.

== Major intersections ==
The entire route is in Montgomery County.

Location	mi	km	Destinations	Notes
	0.000	0.000	AR 27 – Mount Ida, Story	Western terminus
	5.99	9.64	Housley Point Road to Big Fir Public Use Area	
	8.124	13.074	Little Fir Public Use Area	Eastern terminus
1.000 mi = 1.609 km; 1.000 km = 0.621 mi
