= Arkansas Highway 179 =

State highway in Arkansas, United States

Highway 179
- Highway 179 highlighted in red

Route information
- Maintained by ArDOT
- Length: 2.903 mi (4.672 km)
- Existed: September 22, 1998–present

Major junctions
- South end: CR 93
- North end: US 64 in Altus

Location
- Country: United States
- State: Arkansas
- Counties: Franklin

Highway system
- Arkansas Highway System; Interstate; US; State; Business; Spurs; Suffixed; Scenic; Heritage
| ← AR 178 | → AR 180 |

Highway 179 (AR 179, Ark. 179, and Hwy. 179) is a north–south state highway in Franklin County, Arkansas. Since 1998, the state highway designation has run from a county road intersection at the unincorporated community of Greenwood to US Highway 64 (US 64) in Altus. The highway is maintained by the Arkansas Department of Transportation (ArDOT).

== Route description ==
ArDOT maintains all three segments of AR 179 as part of the state highway system. ArDOT estimates the traffic level near the midpoint at 860 vehicles per day in 2019, on average. For reference, roads under 400 VPD are classified as "very low volume local road" by the American Association of State Highway and Transportation Officials (AASHTO).

No segment of AR 179 is part of the National Highway System (NHS), a network of roads important to the nation's economy, defense, and mobility.

Highway 179 begins in eastern Franklin County near the Arkansas River at the unincorporated community of Greenwood. The designation begins at a junction with three county roads: Greenbrier Road heading east, Carbon Plant Road to the west, with the roadway continuing south Kirk Road. AR 179 runs due north from this junction, passing an industrial facility and crossing the Union Pacific Railroad tracks before turning into the Altus city limits. Once in Altus, AR 179 is named Carbon Plant Road; it runs due north to US 64 (US 64, Park Street), where it terminates.

== History ==
Between February 28, 1973 and April 1, 1998, the roadway between US 64 and West Creek Public Use Area had been designated as Highway 924, an Arkansas Game and Fish Commission access road. Though the AR 924 designation was decommissioned following closure of the park, the Arkansas State Highway Commission restored part of the roadway as AR 179 on September 22, 1998.

== Major intersections ==
The entire route is in Franklin County.

| Location | mi | km | Destinations | Notes |
|---|---|---|---|---|
| Greenwood | 0.000 | 0.000 | Begin state maintenance at Greenbrier Road / Carbon Plant Road, roadway continues as CR 93 Kirk Road | Southern terminus |
| Altus | 2.903 | 4.672 | US 64 (Park Street) – Clarksville, Ozark | Northern terminus |
1.000 mi = 1.609 km; 1.000 km = 0.621 mi
