= Arkansas Highway 138 =

State highway in Arkansas, United States

Highway 138

Route information
- Maintained by AHTD
- Length: 37.05 mi (59.63 km)
- Existed: 1930–present

Major junctions
- West end: US 278, Monticello
- US 65 / US 165
- East end: AR 1, Kelso

Location
- Country: United States
- State: Arkansas
- Counties: Drew, Desha

Highway system
- Arkansas Highway System; Interstate; US; State; Business; Spurs; Suffixed; Scenic; Heritage
| ← AR 137 | → AR 139 |

Highway 138 (AR 128, Ark. 138, and Hwy. 138) is an east–west state highway in south Arkansas. The route runs 37.05 miles (59.63 km) from US Route 278 north to Arkansas Highway 1 in Kelso.

== Route description ==
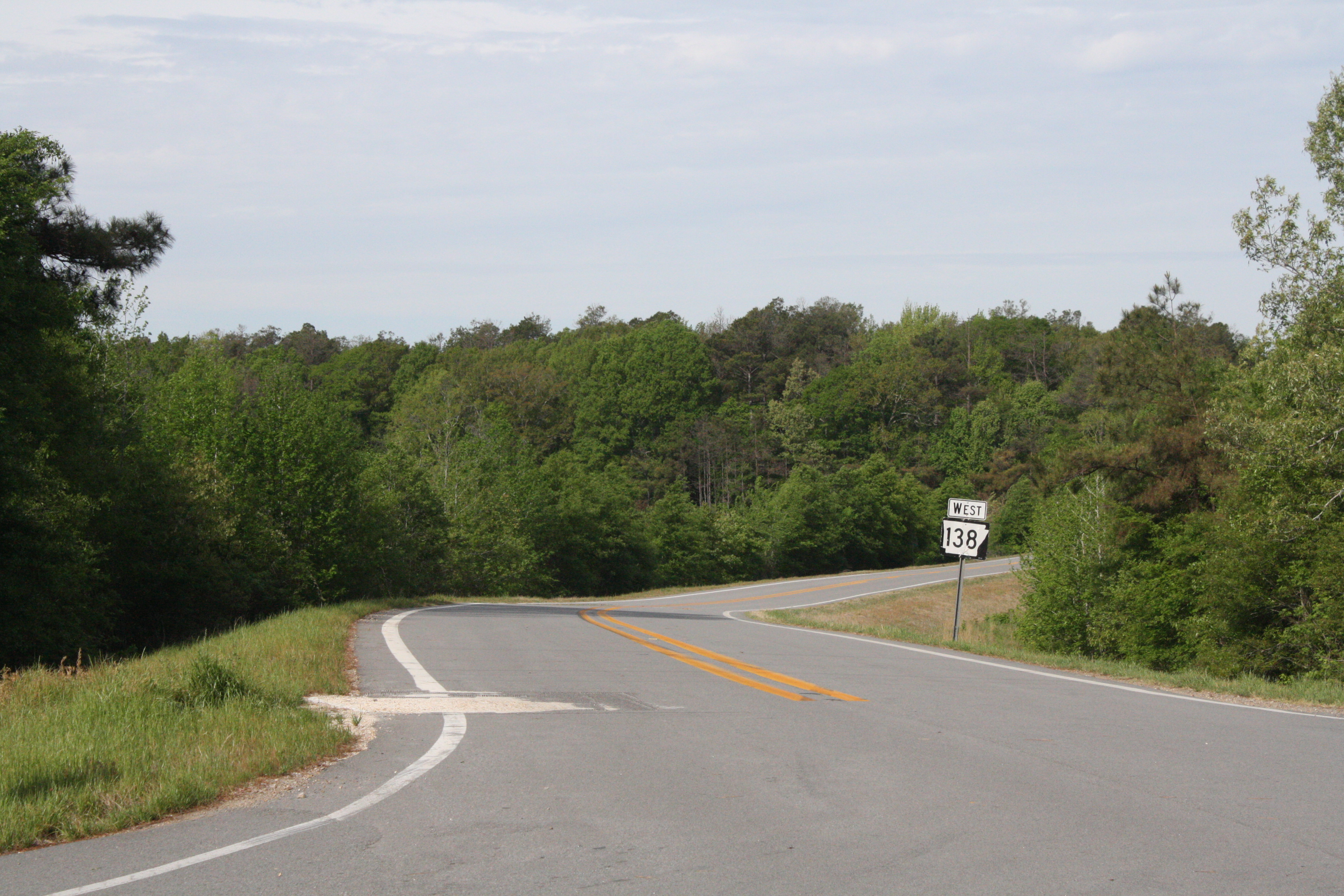
First reassurance marker for AR 138 west of the junction with AR 293 in Drew County

Highway 138 begins at US 278 in Monticello. The highway runs northeast past Ellis Field to intersect Highway 293 in rural Drew County. North of this junction, Highway 138 passes two cemeteries, including the nearby Taylor Log House and Site. Highway 138 continues northeast through farmland to enter Winchester in the northeast corner of the county. Just east of Winchester, Highway 138 intersects US 65/US 165, a divided highway at an at-grade intersection. The route next enters Desha County, serving as the southern terminus of Highway 159. Highway 159 is a minor route within the county, serving only county roads from this point eastward. The highway meets Highway 1 at Kelso, where it terminates. The road is a two-lane, undivided, rural route for its entire length.

FHWA maps indicate that Highway 138 is on the National Highway System east of US 65 / US 165, even though it is a minor two-lane road.

== History ==
The route became a state highway in 1930, running 9.9 miles (15.9 km) from Highway 4 south to McGehee, with Highway 4 running east to Tillar. Prior to 1940, Highway 4 was rerouted onto the former Highway 138, with the former routing to Tillar becoming Highway 138. This change is still apparent on the highway map, as Highway 4 was later replaced by US 278, which creates today's "kink" in US 278 in east Drew County. The routing of today's Highway 138 appears on the state highway maps beginning in the mid–1950s, but is not numbered. Around 1960, a segment from Winchester to Kelso becomes Highway 138, in addition to a segment from Tillar north to Winchester. The Kelso segment was redesignated Arkansas Highway 277 in the mid-1960s, which enabled a contemporaneous extension of Highway 138 from Winchester west to the current Highway 293. By 1966, the route was extended to Monticello. The road was paved from Monticello north in 1967, as the segment between US 65/US 165 and Kelso was paved upon its earlier designation.

== Major intersections ==
| County | Location | mi | km | Destinations | Notes |
|---|---|---|---|---|---|
| Drew | Monticello | 0.0 | 0.0 | US 278 (McCloy Avenue) | Western terminus |
| Drew | | 13.50 | 21.73 | AR 293 | |
| Drew | | 23.39 | 37.64 | US 65 / US 165 – Dumas, McGehee | |
| Desha | | 25.36 | 40.81 | AR 159 north | |
| Desha | Kelso | 37.05 | 59.63 | AR 1 – Back Gate, Rohwer | Eastern terminus |
1.000 mi = 1.609 km; 1.000 km = 0.621 mi

== See also ==
- List of state highways in Arkansas
