= Oakland, Arkansas =

- Census-designated place
- Location within Arkansas Location within the United States
- Coordinates: 36°27′38″N 92°34′18″W
- Country: United States
- State: Arkansas
- County: Marion

Area
  - Total: 1.19 sq mi (3.1 km^{2})
  - Land: 1.19 sq mi (3.1 km^{2})
  - Water: 0.0 sq mi (0 km^{2})
- Elevation: 1,043 ft (318 m)

Population (2020)
  - Total: 72
- Time zone: UTC-6 (Central (CST))
  - Summer (DST): UTC-5 (CDT)
- ZIP code: 72661
- Area code: 870
- GNIS feature ID: 2805669
- FIPS code: 05-51110

Oakland is an unincorporated community and census-designated place (CDP) in northeastern Marion County, Arkansas, United States. Oakland, located on Arkansas Highway 202, is 20 miles (32 km) by road northwest of Mountain Home. Oakland has a post office with ZIP code 72661. The Oakland Campground on Bull Shoals Lake lies about three miles to the west at the end of Route 202. It was first listed as a CDP in the 2020 census, with a population of 72.

== Education ==
It is in the Mountain Home School District. The Oakland School District consolidated into the Mountain Home district on July 1, 1986.

== Demographics ==
Historical population
Census	Pop.	Note	%±
2020	72		—
U.S. Decennial Census; 2020

=== 2020 census ===
Oakland CDP, Arkansas – demographic profile (NH = Non-Hispanic) Note: the US Census treats Hispanic/Latino as an ethnic category. This table excludes Latinos from the racial categories and assigns them to a separate category. Hispanics/Latinos may be of any race.
Race / Ethnicity	Pop 2020	% 2020
White alone (NH)	71	98.61%
Black or African American alone (NH)	0	0.00%
Native American or Alaska Native alone (NH)	0	0.00%
Asian alone (NH)	1	1.39%
Pacific Islander alone (NH)	0	0.00%
Some Other Race alone (NH)	0	0.00%
Mixed Race/Multi-Racial (NH)	0	0.00%
Hispanic or Latino (any race)	0	0.00%
Total	72	100.00%
