= Shumaker Naval Ammunition Depot =

Historic munitions manufacturing facility in Arkansas, United States

- Shumaker Naval Ammunition Depot (NAD) Administration Building
- U.S. National Register of Historic Places
- Location within Arkansas Location within the United States
- Location: 6415 Spellman Rd, East Camden, Arkansas
- Coordinates: 33°37′56″N 92°43′04″W
- Area: 0.9 acres (0.36 ha)
- Built: c.1945
- NRHP reference No.: 100002449
- Added to NRHP: May 21, 2018

The Shumaker Naval Ammunition Depot was a munitions manufacturing facility of the United States Navy located in Calhoun and Ouachita counties in southern Arkansas. It operated from 1945 until 1957, producing Sidewinder missiles and other weapons. The property was sold off in 1961. Part of the original site now houses Southern Arkansas University Tech. Two of its surviving buildings, the 500-Man Barracks and the Administration Building, were listed on the National Register of Historic Places in 2018.

At the time of construction, the depot was planned to be a 110 square mile site serving as the "principal rocket loading, assembly, and storage plant" for the United States, with a permanent complement of 5000 personnel.

== Other naval munitions plants ==
Other inland naval munitions plants were located at Naval Ammunition Depot, Crane in Burns City, Indiana, McAlester Naval Depot in McAlester, Oklahoma and the Hawthorne Naval Ammunition Depot in Hawthorne, Nevada.

== See also ==
- National Register of Historic Places listings in Calhoun County, Arkansas
- United States v. Atlantic Research Corp., a United States Supreme Court case about a dispute centered on the depot.
