= Kelso, Arkansas =

- Unincorporated community
- Kelso's location in Arkansas Kelso (the United States)
- Coordinates: 33°47′51″N 91°16′14″W
- Country: United States
- State: Arkansas
- County: Desha
- Township: Richland
- Elevation: 144 ft (44 m)
- Time zone: UTC-6 (Central (CST))
  - Summer (DST): UTC-5 (CDT)
- GNIS feature ID: 50800

Kelso is an unincorporated community in Desha County, Arkansas, United States. The community is located at the intersection of Arkansas Highway 1 and Arkansas Highway 138.
