= Bellaire, Arkansas =

- Unincorporated community
- Location within Arkansas Location within the United States
- Coordinates: 33°30′15″N 91°21′33″W
- Country: United States
- State: Arkansas
- County: Chicot
- Elevation: 135 ft (41 m)
- Time zone: UTC-6 (Central (CST))
  - Summer (DST): UTC-5 (CDT)
- GNIS feature ID: 61706

Bellaire is an unincorporated community in Chicot County, Arkansas, United States. It is located on U.S. Route 65.
