= Pleasant Hill (north), Logan County, Arkansas =

Pleasant Hill
- Unincorporated community
- Location within Arkansas Location within the United States
- Coordinates: 35°20′14″N 93°36′51″W
- Country: United States
- State: Arkansas
- County: Logan
- Elevation: 420 ft (130 m)
- Time zone: UTC-6 (Central (CST))
  - Summer (DST): UTC-5 (CDT)
- Area code: 479
- GNIS feature ID: 78042

Pleasant Hill is an unincorporated community in Logan County, Arkansas, United States. Pleasant Hill is located on Arkansas Highway 197, 7.25 miles (11.67 km) east-northeast of Paris.
