= Arkansas Highway 159 =

State highway in Arkansas, United States

Highway 159
- Segments of AR 159 in red

Route information
- Maintained by AHTD

Location
- Country: United States
- State: Arkansas

Highway system
- Arkansas Highway System; Interstate; US; State; Business; Spurs; Suffixed; Scenic; Heritage
← AR 158	→ AR 160

Highway 159 (AR 159, Ark. 159, and Hwy. 159) is a designation for eight state highways in Chicot and Desha Counties.

== Route description ==
=== Louisiana to Eudora ===
Highway 159
- Location: LA 17–Eudora
- Length: 7.81 mi (12.57 km)

=== Eudora to Lake Village ===
Highway 159
- Location: Eudora–Lake Village
- Length: 5.48 mi (8.82 km)

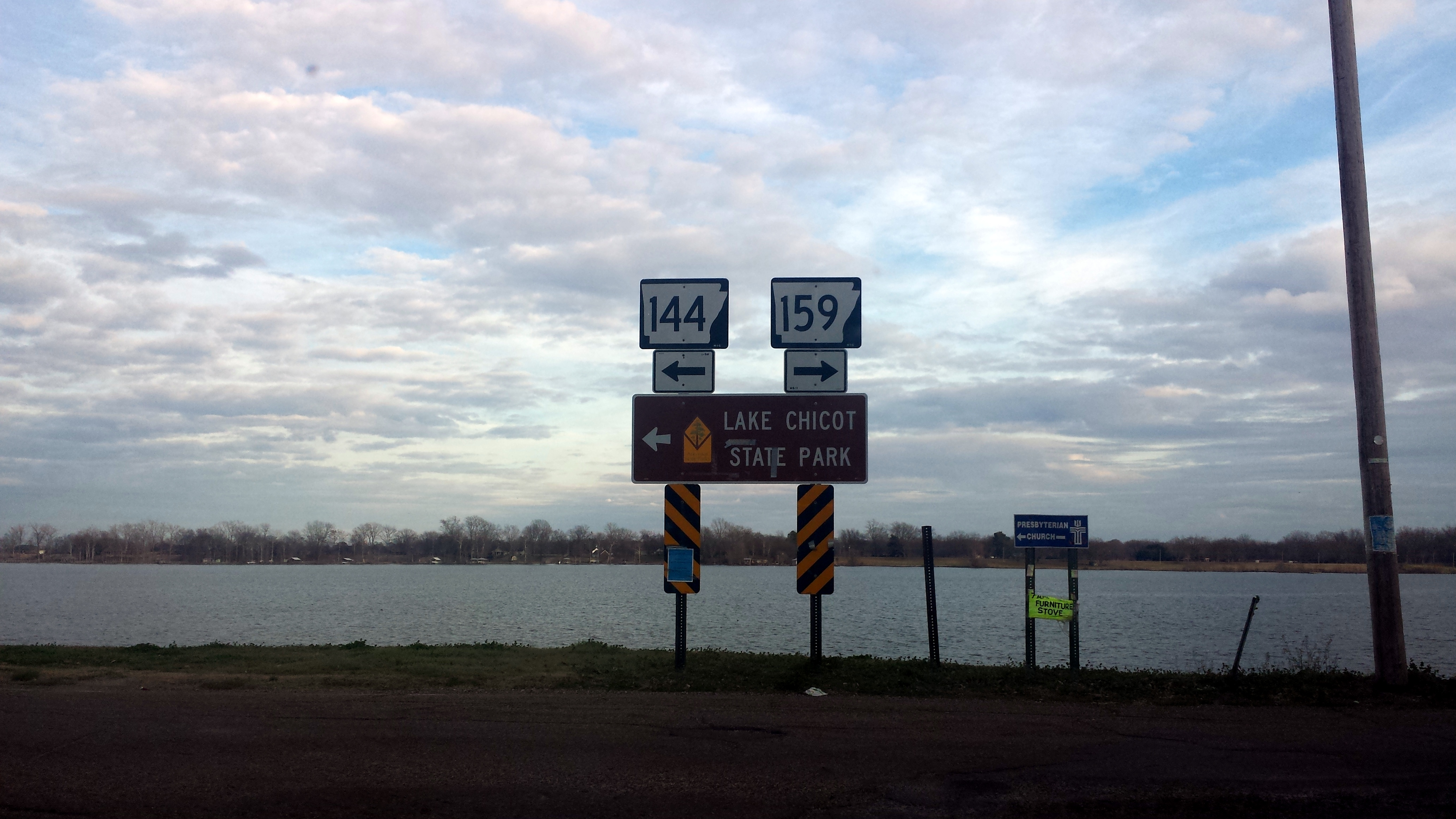
Highway 159 begins at Highway 144 and runs south along Lake Chicot in Lake Village

Between Lake Village and Eudora, Arkansas, Highway 159 follows the original 1926 alignment of U.S. 65

=== Halley to Trippe Junction ===
Highway 159
- Location: Halley–Trippe Junction
- Length: 4.92 mi (7.92 km)

=== US 65 to McGehee ===
Highway 159
- Location: US 65–McGehee
- Length: 4.60 mi (7.40 km)

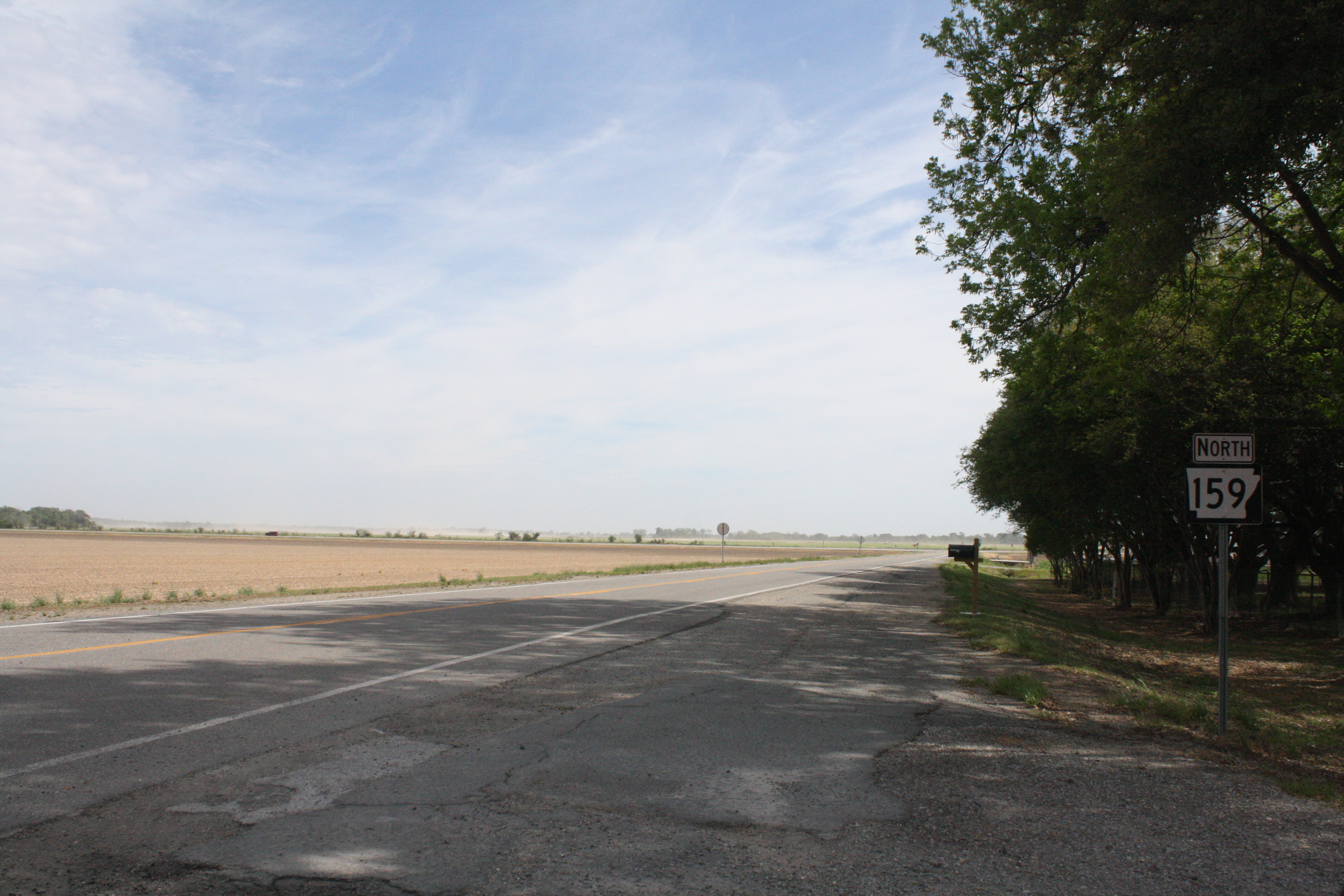
AR 159 turns east from First Street to Silent Street in McGehee

=== From US 278 north, McGehee ===
Highway 159
- Location: US 65–McGehee
- Length: 1.53 mi (2.46 km)

=== Downtown McGehee ===
Highway 159
- Location: Downtown McGehee
- Length: 0.80 mi (1,290 m)

=== AR 138 to Omega ===
Highway 159
- Location: AR 138–Omega
- Length: 4.41 mi (7.10 km)

=== Dumas to Mitchellville ===
Highway 159
- Location: Dumas–Mitchellville
- Length: 1.74 mi (2.80 km)
