= East Camden, Arkansas =

- City
- Location in Ouachita County and Arkansas.
- Coordinates: 33°36′33″N 92°45′05″W
- Country: United States
- State: Arkansas
- County: Ouachita

Area
  - Total: 0.76 sq mi (1.97 km^{2})
  - Land: 0.76 sq mi (1.97 km^{2})
  - Water: 0 sq mi (0.00 km^{2})
- Elevation: 131 ft (40 m)

Population (2020)
  - Total: 798
  - Estimate (2025): 758 ▼
  - Density: 1,049.0/sq mi (405.03/km^{2})
- Time zone: UTC-6 (Central (CST))
  - Summer (DST): UTC-5 (CDT)
- ZIP code: 71701
- Area code: 870
- FIPS code: 05-20440
- GNIS feature ID: 2406413
- Website: eastcamdenar.gov

East Camden is a city in Ouachita County, Arkansas, United States. As of the 2020 census, the population of the city was 798.

== History ==
East Camden was originally called Billkitts Rental Housing and began as a planned community created to support the nearby Shumaker Naval Ammunition Depot.

As he did for the rest of the facility, the depot's Chief Maintenance Engineer, A.T. Smith, designed the general layout of the town and named its streets. U.S. Senator John Little McClellan later arranged for Smith, who boasted the most intimate knowledge of the depot, to travel to Washington, D.C., and negotiate "over White House tea" with Lyndon B. Johnson to transfer ownership of the sprawling NAD complex to Johnson's Brown and Root.

Brown and Root's Highland Resources would later transform the depot into an industrial park catering primarily to defense contractors who could be enticed by the local eight-mile (13 km) long rocket range, the vast array of underground storage bunkers, highly specialized building infrastructure, low cost of labor and excellent railroad system. As part of the transfer agreement, the Brown Foundation also donated 70 acres (280,000 m^{2}) of land and six buildings to establish a two-year technical college now known as Southern Arkansas University Tech.

== Geography ==
According to the United States Census Bureau, the town has a total area of 1.5 km^{2} (0.58 sq mi), all land.

== Demographics ==
Historical population
Census	Pop.	Note	%±
1970	589		—
1980	632		7.3%
1990	783		23.9%
2000	902		15.2%
2010	931		3.2%
2020	798		−14.3%
2025 (est.)	758	▼	−5.0%
U.S. Decennial Census

It is part of the Camden Micropolitan Statistical Area.

As of the 2010 United States census, there were 931 people living in the town. The racial makeup of the town was 64.2% White, 31.0% Black, 0.2% Native American, 0.4% Asian and 1.4% from two or more races. 2.7% were Hispanic or Latino of any race.

As of the census of 2000, there were 902 people, 365 households, and 251 families living in the town. The population density was 621.9 people /km^{2} (1,611 people/mi^{2}). There were 401 housing units at an average density of 276.5 units /km^{2} (716 units/mi^{2}). The racial makeup of the town was 70.18% White, 26.83% Black or African American, 0.22% Native American, 1.11% from other races, and 1.66% from two or more races. 3.33% of the population were Hispanic or Latino of any race.

There were 365 households, out of which 42.5% had children under the age of 18 living with them, 47.1% were married couples living together, 16.7% had a female householder with no husband present, and 31.2% were non-families. 27.7% of all households were made up of individuals, and 4.7% had someone living alone who was 65 years of age or older. The average household size was 2.47 and the average family size was 3.00.

In the town, the population was spread out, with 30.6% under the age of 18, 13.4% from 18 to 24, 32.6% from 25 to 44, 17.1% from 45 to 64, and 6.3% who were 65 years of age or older. The median age was 28 years. For every 100 females, there were 96.1 males. For every 100 females age 18 and over, there were 87.4 males.

The median income for a household in the town was $30,804, and the median income for a family was $40,568. Males had a median income of $27,500 versus $20,114 for females. The per capita income for the town was $13,272. About 9.2% of families and 11.9% of the population were below the poverty line, including 11.4% of those under age 18 and 9.1% of those age 65 or over.
