= Arkansas Highway 168 =

State highway in Arkansas, United States

Highway 168

Route information
- Maintained by ArDOT
- Length: 8.59 mi (13.82 km)
- Tourist routes: Crowley's Ridge Parkway

Major junctions
- West end: AR 228 at Fontaine
- AR 141 in Loredo
- East end: US 412

Location
- Country: United States
- State: Arkansas
- Counties: Greene

Highway system
- Arkansas Highway System; Interstate; US; State; Business; Spurs; Suffixed; Scenic; Heritage
← US 167	→ AR 169

Arkansas Highway 168 (AR 168 and Hwy. 168) is an east–west state highway in Greene County, Arkansas. The route of 8.59 miles (13.82 km) runs from Highway 228 east through Crowley's Ridge State Park to US Route 412 (US 412). A segment of the route composes the Crowley's Ridge Parkway.

== Route description ==
Highway 168 begins at Highway 228 at Fontaine and runs east. The route runs through Loredo before forming a concurrency with Highway 141 (Crowley's Ridge Parkway) north to Walcott. Highway 141 continues north at a fork in the road, while Highway 168 turns northeast to Crowley's Ridge State Park. The Crowley's Ridge Parkway designation changes at this fork, following Highway 168 through the park. In the park, Highway serves the Crowley's Ridge Bathhouse, Comfort Station, Dining Hall, a historic bridge, and Walcot Lake. Further north, Highway 168 continues to US 412, where it terminates.

== Major intersections ==
The entire route is in Greene County.

Location	mi	km	Destinations	Notes
Fontaine	0.00	0.00	AR 228 – Sedgwick, Light	Western terminus
	6.08	9.78	AR 141 south – Jonesboro	
AR 141 concurrency north, 4.5 miles (7.2 km)
Walcott	0.00	0.00	AR 141 north to US 412	
	8.59	13.82	US 412 – Walnut Ridge, Paragould	Eastern terminus
1.000 mi = 1.609 km; 1.000 km = 0.621 mi

== See also ==
- List of state highways in Arkansas
