= Arkansas Highway 141 =

Highway in Arkansas

Highway 141

Route information
- Maintained by ArDOT
- Existed: c. June 1, 1931–present

Section 1
- Length: 2.053 mi (3.304 km)
- South end: Culberhouse Street in Jonesboro
- North end: Parker Road in Jonesboro

Section 2
- Length: 51.535 mi (82.938 km)
- South end: Main Street in Jonesboro
- North end: US 62 in McDougal

Location
- Country: United States
- State: Arkansas
- Counties: Craighead, Greene, Clay

Highway system
- Arkansas Highway System; Interstate; US; State; Business; Spurs; Suffixed; Scenic; Heritage
← AR 140	→ AR 142

Highway 141 (AR 141 and Hwy. 141) is designation for two north–south state highways in Northeast Arkansas. The longer segment was created in 1931 and extended throughout the mid-20th century to the current alignment connecting Jonesboro and points north. The Jonesboro segment was a former city street added to the state highway system in 1973. Both are maintained by the Arkansas Department of Transportation.

== Route description ==
The ArDOT maintains Highway 141 like all other parts of the state highway system. As a part of these responsibilities, the department tracks the volume of traffic using its roads in surveys using a metric called average annual daily traffic (AADT). ArDOT estimates the traffic level for a segment of roadway for any average day of the year in these surveys. As of 2019, AADT was estimated on the longer segment as 14,000 vehicles per day (VPD) near the southern terminus and 260 VPD near the northern terminus. The AADT on the Jonesboro section was 6000 VPD. For reference, the American Association of State Highway and Transportation Officials (AASHTO), classifies roads with fewer than 400 vehicles per day as a very low volume local road.

No segment of Highway 263 has been listed as part of the National Highway System, a network of roads important to the nation's economy, defense, and mobility.

=== Jonesboro ===
The Highway 141 designation and state maintenance begin on Culberhouse Street in Jonesboro in Craighead County. It runs north as a two-lane section line road, passing Craighead Forest Park and residential parts of Jonesboro, with homes growing increasingly dense as the road travels north. Highway 141 terminates at Parker Road, a frontage road for Interstate 555/US 49/US 63/AR 18.

=== Jonesboro to McDougal ===
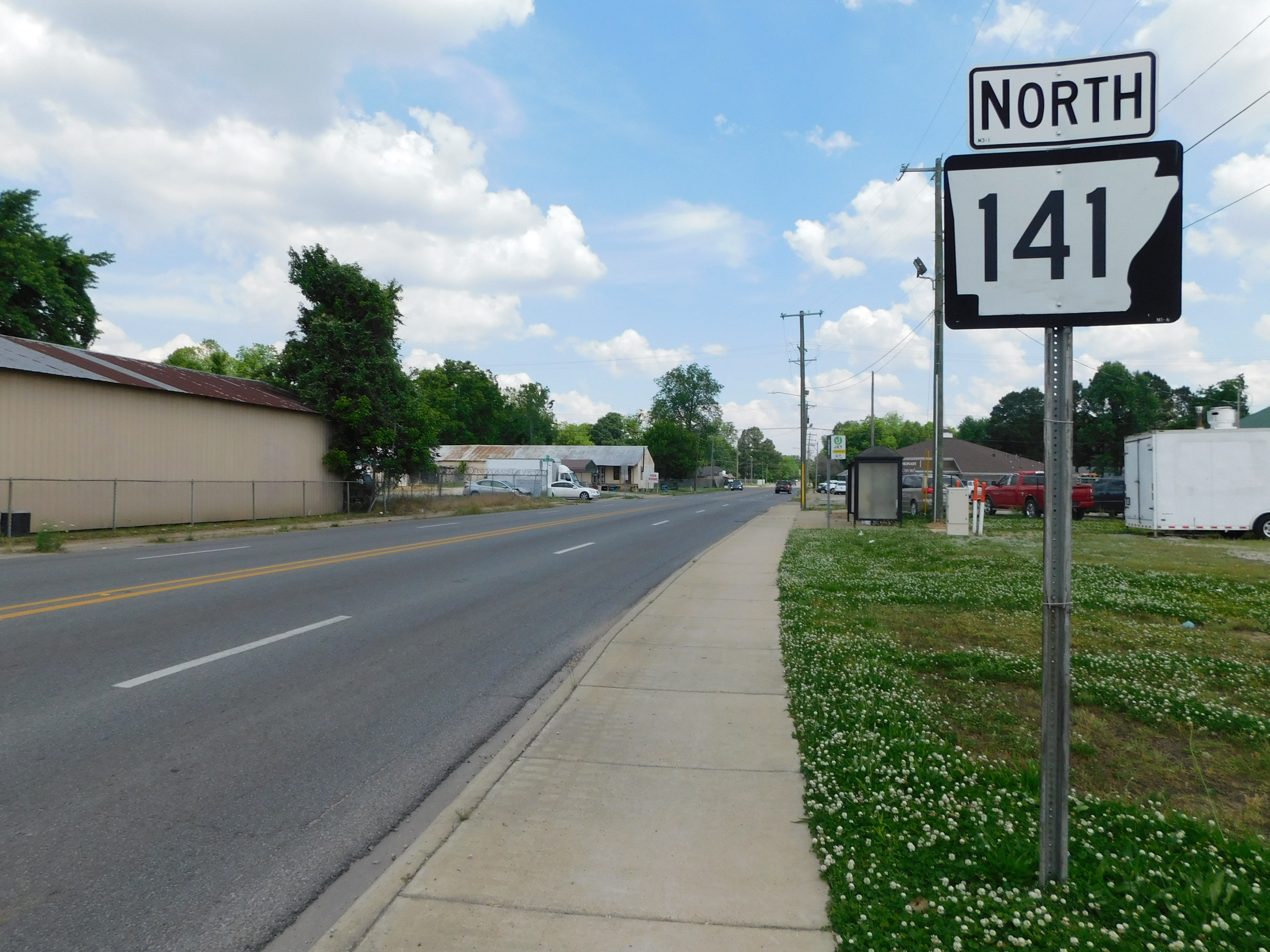
First Highway 141 reassurance marker north of the Highway 91 intersection

The Highway 141 designation begins in Jonesboro as Main Street at a bridge over a rail yard where a One-way pair of roads (Main Street and Union Street) combine north of downtown Jonesboro. At the north end of the bridge, Highway 141 intersects Highway 91 (Johnson Avenue) then continues north through a residential area of the city. Highway 91 crosses Lost Creek Ditch before curving one block and becoming Church Street. The road continues north, passing the Jonesboro Math and Science Magnet School, crossing Culberhouse Lateral, and running through a neighborhood known as Philadelphia before leaving the city limits of Jonesboro and entering a rural part of Craighead County. At an intersection with Craighead County Road 766 (New Haven Church Road), Highway 141 meets the Crowley's Ridge Parkway, a National Scenic Byway designation that follows the Crowley's Ridge landform, with the Parkway designation following Highway 141 northbound through the unincorporated communities of Sterling Spring and Herndon before entering Greene County.

Shortly upon entering Greene County, Highway 141 serves the entrance drive (unsigned AR 600) to Lake Frierson State Park, and runs along the park's eastern boundary. After crossing Big Creek, Highway 141 has a junction with Highway 168 near Lorado, with a concurrency forming northbound. Highway 141, Highway 168, and Crowley's Ridge Parkway continue together northbound through a rural part of Crowley's Ridge, serving as the western terminus of Highway 358, passing through Ebenezer, and serving the Mt. Zion Baptist Camp. The concurrency ends upon reaching Walcott, with Highway 141 turning left and Highway 168 and the Parkway designation continuing northeast toward Crowley's Ridge State Park. Continuing west, Highway 141 turns north to become a section line road through a sparsely populated agricultural area, briefly serving as the western boundary of Crowley's Ridge State Park before intersecting US Highway 412 (US 412). Highway 141 continues north, bridging Old Sugar Creek, turning in Stanford, crossing Lick Creek, and intersecting Highway 34 in Beech Grove. North of this junction, Highway 141 winds to the northeast, roughly paralleling the Cache River and serving as the northwestern edge of the W.E. Brewer Scatter Creek Wildlife Management Area (WMA) before reaching Hooker, where it junctions with Highway 135, which carries the Crowley's Ridge Parkway designation southbound. Highway 141 takes the Parkway designation northbound from this junction into Clay County.

Highway 141 winds north through the unincorporated community of Knob, where it passes a historic schoolhouse listed on the National Register of Historic Places, before forming a concurrency with Highway 90 toward Boydsville. In Boydsville, Highway 141 and Crowley's Ridge Parkway turn north from Highway 90 and begin running as a section line road to the small town of McDougal 4.5 miles (7.2 km) south of the Missouri state line. In McDougal, Highway 141 terminates at an intersection with US 62 (Dale Street), with the Parkway designation following US 62 eastbound.

== History ==
Highway 141 first appears on the Arkansas State Highway Map published June 1931 as State Road 141. Running only between Jonesboro and State Road 25 (modern-day US 412); the route was marked as "gravel or stone surfaced" in Craighead County and "unimproved dirt" in Greene County. An extension north to State Road 37 at Beech Grove first appeared on the 1937 map. The alignment was shifted by the Arkansas State Highway Commission between State Road 25 and Beech Grove at the request of a local petition on May 20, 1954.

On November 23, 1966, the Highway Commission extended Highway 141 north to Hooker and created a second, discontinuous segment of Highway 141 along a county road between Knob and McDougal. The gap between Hooker and Knob was closed on December 13, 1972. A one-way pair was established along Main and Church Streets in Jonesboro between Allen and Forrest Streets on July 26, 1978. Initially the pair was approved but would remain under city maintenance; but was fully added to the state highway system on April 25, 1979. The highway was extended south to the current southern terminus on November 26, 1996, following deletion of US Highway 49 Business (US 49B).

In 1973, the Arkansas General Assembly passed Act 9 of 1973. The act directed county judges and legislators to designate up to 12 miles (19 km) of county roads as state highways in each county. As a result of this legislation, a part of Culberhouse Street in Jonesboro was added to the state highway system by the Highway Commission on May 23, 1973.

== Major intersections ==
County	Location	mi	km	Destinations	Notes
Craighead	Jonesboro	0.00	0.00	Begin state maintenance on Culberhouse Street	Southern terminus
Craighead	Jonesboro	2.053	3.304	Parker Road	Northern terminus
Craighead	Jonesboro	Gap in route			
Craighead	Jonesboro	0.000	0.000	Main Street	Southern terminus
Craighead	Jonesboro	0.17	0.27	AR 91 (Johnson Avenue) – Walnut Ridge	
Craighead		4.56	7.34	CR 766 east (New Haven Church Road) / Crowley's Ridge Pkwy. south	Begin CRP overlap
Greene	Lake Frierson State Park	9.45	15.21	Lake Frierson State Park (AR 600)	
Greene		10.96	17.64	AR 168 west	Begin AR 168 overlap
Greene		11.52	18.54	AR 358 east – Paragould	AR 358 western terminus
Greene		15.40	24.78	AR 168 east / Crowley's Ridge Pkwy. north – Crowley's Ridge State Park	End AR 168/CRR overlaps
Greene		17.347	27.917	US 412 – Paragould, Walnut Ridge	
Greene	Beech Grove	26.73	43.02	AR 34 – Paragould, Delaplaine	
Greene	Hooker	33.414	53.775	AR 135 / Crowley's Ridge Pkwy. south – Paragould	Begin CRP overlap
Clay		44.348– 0.000	71.371– 0.000	AR 90 – Boydsville	
Clay	McDougal	7.187	11.566	US 62 / Crowley's Ridge Pkwy. north – Piggott, Corning	Northern terminus
1.000 mi = 1.609 km; 1.000 km = 0.621 mi: Concurrency terminus

== Sources ==
- "Minutes of the Meeting of the Arkansas State Highway Commission" (PDF). Little Rock: Arkansas State Highway Commission. 1953–1969. OCLC 21798861. Archived from the original (PDF) on October 1, 2018.
- "Minutes of the Meeting of the Arkansas State Highway Commission" (PDF). Little Rock: Arkansas State Highway Commission. 1970–1979. OCLC 21798861. Archived from the original (PDF) on November 5, 2011.
- "Minutes of the Meeting of the Arkansas State Highway Commission" (PDF). Little Rock: Arkansas State Highway Commission. 1980–1989. OCLC 21798861.
- "Minutes of the Meeting of the Arkansas State Highway Commission" (PDF). Little Rock: Arkansas State Highway Commission. 1990–1999. OCLC 21798861. Archived from the original (PDF) on July 21, 2019.
- "Minutes of the Meeting of the Arkansas State Highway Commission" (PDF). Little Rock: Arkansas State Highway Commission. 2000–2009. OCLC 21798861.
- "Minutes of the Meeting of the Arkansas State Highway Commission" (PDF). Little Rock: Arkansas State Highway Commission. 2010–2019. OCLC 21798861. Archived from the original (PDF) on March 4, 2016.
