= Benjamin Crowley =

Pioneer settler of Arkansas, USA

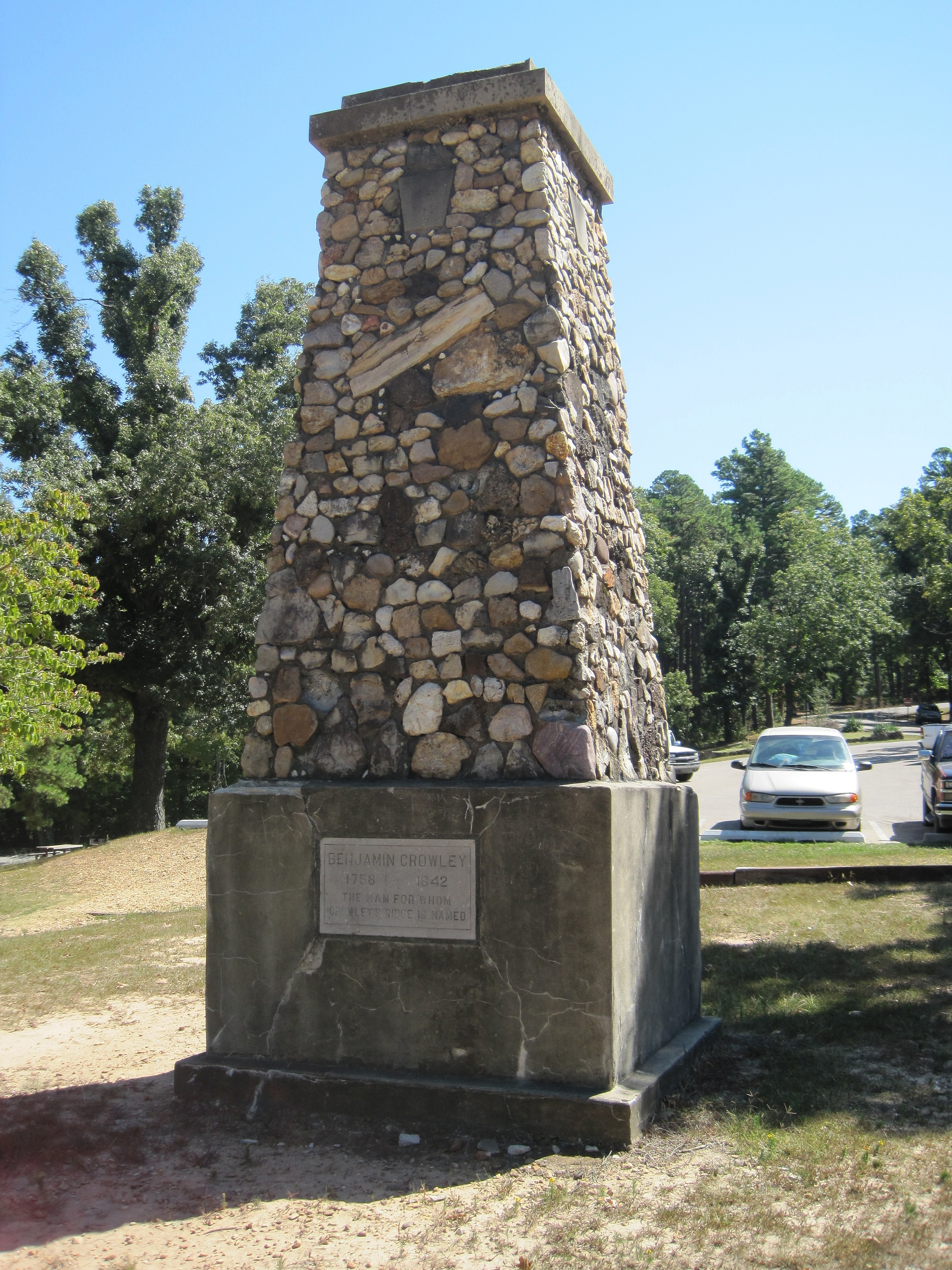
- Crowley's grave in Shiloh Cemetery at Crowley's Ridge State Park south of Paragould, Arkansas. The inscription reads "Benjamin Crowley - 1758-1842 - The man for whom Crowley's Ridge is named."
- Born: Benjamin Crowley, Jr. c. 1758; Halifax County, Virginia
- Died: 1842 (aged 83–84); Greene County, Arkansas
- Resting place: Shiloh Cemetery, Crowley's Ridge State Park
- Occupation: Landowner
- Known for: Crowley's Ridge
- Spouse: Catherine Annie Wiley

Benjamin Crowley (c. 1758 – 1842) was a 19th-century American pioneer and the namesake of Crowley's Ridge.

== Early life and westward migration ==
Crowley was born in Halifax County, Virginia, the son of Benjamin Crowley and Sarah Strong. By 1787, he was living in Oglethorpe County, Georgia, to which the Crowley and Strong families had migrated. On August 9, 1808, he patented 200 acres (81 ha) in Christian County, Kentucky. He was listed living there on the 1810 census. By June 16, 1817, Benjamin was listed in Lawrence County, Arkansas where he was the administrator of his son John's estate.

== Crowley's Ridge ==
On October 12, 1819, Benjamin Crowley purchased land from Solomon Hewitt for $200 on the Spring River about two miles (3 km) above the mouth of the Eleven Point River, on the North side of said Spring River where Benjamin was currently living. On November 27, 1820, Benjamin Crowley was issued a land bounty of 160 acres (65 ha) for his service in the War of 1812. The land was in Phillips County, Arkansas. He was listed as a Matross in Hobart's Company of Light Artillery. In 1821 he moved to and founded Crowley's Ridge. In 1832 he founded the Post Office for Greene County, which was formed in 1833. On August 16, 1838, Benjamin Crowley had 80 acres (32 ha) bounty land, his son, Wiley, had 40 acres (16 ha). Benjamin died in 1842 and is buried at Pioneer Cemetery, also called Shiloh Cemetery. In the 1930s, the Civilian Conservation Corps built numerous buildings on Crowley's Ridge State Park which encompasses his estate. They also constructed a monument where he was buried.

Benjamin Crowley helped found Greene County, Arkansas, was its first postmaster and also founded the first church. He has many descendants living on Crowley's Ridge to this day, and his land, now Crowley's Ridge State Park, is a very popular tourist destination. Arkansas also built the Crowley's Ridge Parkway, linking many of the parks and popular attractions throughout eastern Arkansas.

== Personal life ==
On December 15, 1795, he married Catherine Annie Wiley, the daughter of Peter Wiley and Mary Sharkey. Catherine was born c. 1771 in Augusta County, Virginia and died in 1850 at Crowley (present day Walcott) in Greene County, Arkansas.

Their children were:

1. Thomas Crowley (March 18, 1796 – bef 1829) who married Cynthia Campbell
2. Samuel Crowley (February 28, 1798 – March 13, 1837) who married Sarah Lamb and Sarah Hutchins
3. John Crowley (February 28, 1800 – 1816)
4. Wiley Crowley (March 27, 1803 – abt 1847) who married Lucy Capps
5. Polly Crowley (April 5, 1805 – abt 1841) who married Abraham Pevehouse
6. Benjamin Crowley III (November 1, 1807 – bef 1830) who died building a military road
7. Margaret Crowley (May 15, 1810 – ?) who married Charles Robertson and John McDaniel
8. Sarah Crowley (1812–?) who married Thomas Lamb
