= Cotton Belt (disambiguation) =

The Cotton Belt is a region of the southern United States known for its historical cotton production.

Cotton Belt may also refer to:

- Cotton Belt, Arkansas, an incorporated community
- St. Louis Southwestern Railway, a defunct southern US railway commonly known and branded as the Cotton Belt Route
- Cotton Belt Rail Line, working name for the Silver Line, a commuter rail line in the Dallas–Fort Worth metroplex
