= Crowley's Ridge State Park-Comfort Station =

- U.S. National Register of Historic Places
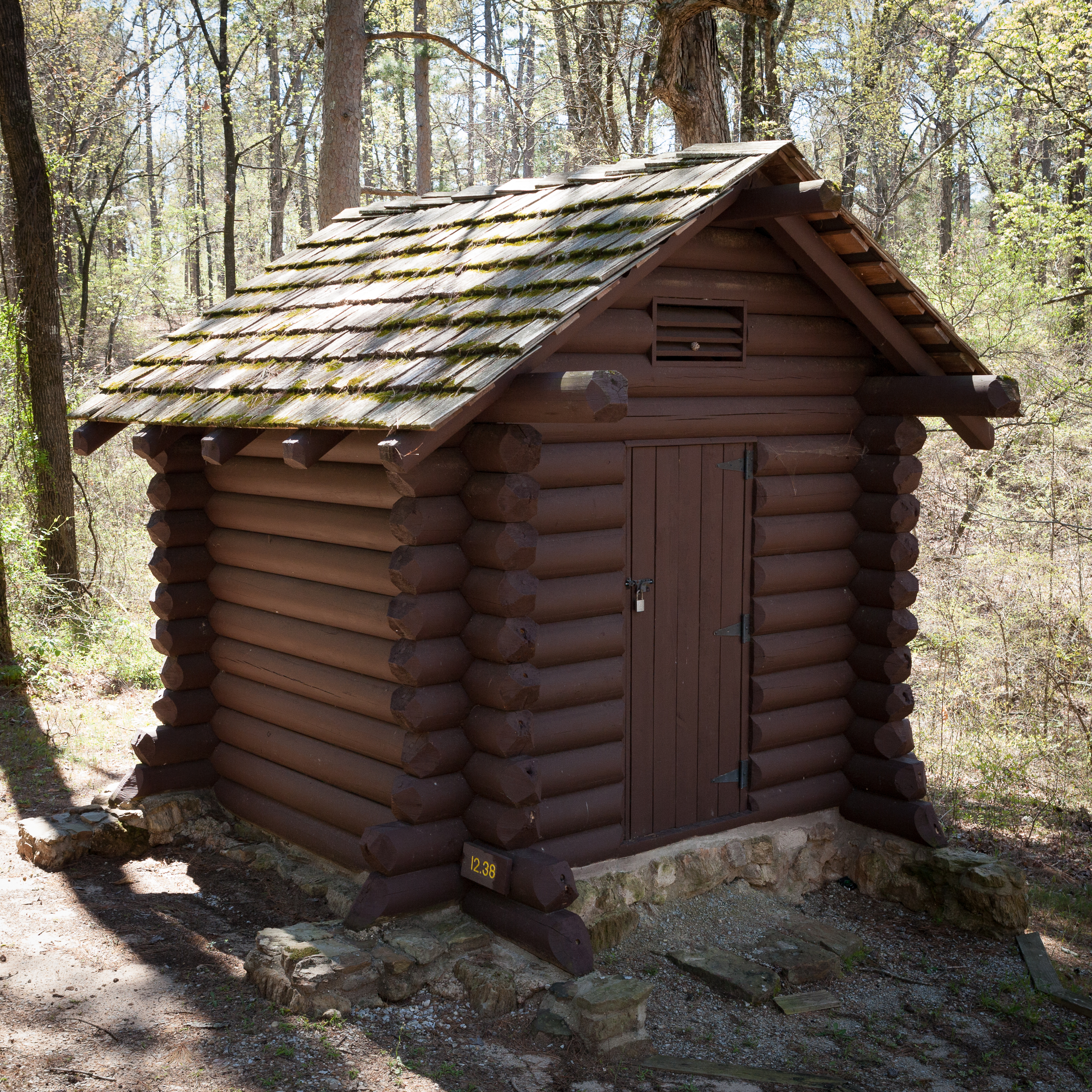

- Location within Arkansas Location within the United States
- Nearest city: Walcott, Arkansas
- Coordinates: 36°2′37″N 90°39′37″W
- Area: less than one acre
- Built: 1935
- Built by: Civilian Conservation Corps
- Architectural style: Rustic Resort
- MPS: Facilities Constructed by the CCC in Arkansas MPS
- NRHP reference No.: 92000538
- Added to NRHP: May 28, 1992

The Crowley's Ridge State Park Comfort Station is a historic visitor facility at Crowley's Ridge State Park, in Greene County, Arkansas. Located in the campground section of the park, it is a single-story log structure with a gable roof, in which are latrine facilities. It was built c. 1933 by a crew of the Civilian Conservation Corps, and is a well-preserved example of the Rustic style architecture the CCC popularized.

The building was listed on the National Register of Historic Places in 1992.

== See also ==
- National Register of Historic Places listings in Greene County, Arkansas
