= Oak Grove Heights, Arkansas =

- City
- Location of Oak Grove Heights in Greene County, Arkansas.
- Coordinates: 36°07′20″N 90°30′25″W
- Country: United States
- State: Arkansas
- County: Greene

Area
  - Total: 3.00 sq mi (7.77 km^{2})
  - Land: 3.00 sq mi (7.76 km^{2})
  - Water: 0.0077 sq mi (0.02 km^{2})
- Elevation: 308 ft (94 m)

Population (2020)
  - Total: 1,104
  - Estimate (2025): 1,195 ▲
  - Density: 368.7/sq mi (142.34/km^{2})
- Time zone: UTC-6 (Central (CST))
  - Summer (DST): UTC-5 (CDT)
- FIPS code: 05-51060
- GNIS feature ID: 2407018
- Website: www.cityofoakgroveheightsar.com

Oak Grove Heights is a city in Greene County, Arkansas, United States. The population was 1,104 at the 2020 census.

== Geography ==
According to the United States Census Bureau, the town has a total area of 7.9 km^{2} (3.0 mi^{2}), of which 7.9 km^{2} (3.0 mi^{2}) is land and 0.33% is water.

== Demographics ==
Historical population
Census	Pop.	Note	%±
1980	486		—
1990	513		5.6%
2000	727		41.7%
2010	889		22.3%
2020	1,104		24.2%
2025 (est.)	1,195	▲	8.2%
U.S. Decennial Census

As of the 2010 United States census, there were 889 people living in the town. The racial makeup of the town was 97.4% White, 1.0% Black, 0.1% Native American and 0.2% Asian. 1.2% were Hispanic or Latino of any race.

As of the census of 2000, there were 727 people, 264 households, and 218 families living in the town. The population density was 92.3/km^{2} (239.0/mi^{2}). There were 282 housing units at an average density of 35.8/km^{2} (92.7/mi^{2}). The racial makeup of the town was 99.04% White, and 0.96% from two or more races.

There were 264 households, out of which 37.5% had children under the age of 18 living with them, 71.6% were married couples living together, 6.8% had a female householder with no husband present, and 17.4% were non-families. 15.9% of all households were made up of individuals, and 5.7% had someone living alone who was 65 years of age or older. The average household size was 2.75 and the average family size was 3.07.

In the town, the population was spread out, with 27.2% under the age of 18, 11.4% from 18 to 24, 28.2% from 25 to 44, 24.8% from 45 to 64, and 8.4% who were 65 years of age or older. The median age was 33 years. For every 100 females, there were 102.5 males. For every 100 females age 18 and over, there were 98.1 males.

The median income for a household in the town was $31,979, and the median income for a family was $37,083. Males had a median income of $25,333 versus $18,000 for females. The per capita income for the town was $12,603. About 7.9% of families and 9.8% of the population were below the poverty line, including 7.1% of those under age 18 and 19.2% of those age 65 or over.

== Education ==
It is in the Paragould School District. Two schools are in Oak Grove Heights: Oak Grove Elementary School (grades 2-4) and Oak Grove Middle School (grades 5-6).

Zoned schools of Oak Grove Heights that are in Paragould are: Paragould Primary School (PreKindergarten-Grade 1), Paragould Junior High School (Grades 7-8), and Paragould High School (9-12).
