= Arkansas Highway 358 =

State highway in Arkansas, United States

Highway 358

Route information
- Maintained by ArDOT
- Length: 13.89 mi (22.35 km)
- Existed: 1967–present

Major junctions
- West end: AR 141 near Lorado
- US 412 in Paragould; US 49 / AR 1 in Paragould
- East end: AR 69 in Paragould

Location
- Country: United States
- State: Arkansas
- Counties: Greene

Highway system
- Arkansas Highway System; Interstate; US; State; Business; Spurs; Suffixed; Scenic; Heritage
← AR 357	→ AR 359

Arkansas Highway 358 (AR 358 and Hwy. 358) is an east–west state highway in Greene County, Arkansas. The route of 13.89 miles (22.35 km) runs from Highway 141 east through to Highway 69 in Paragould.

== Route description ==
AR 358 begins at Highway 141 and runs east past the Old Bethel Methodist Church to serve as the northern terminus for Highway 351. Further east the route has a gap at U.S. Route 49 (US 49) and AR 1 in Paragould after intersecting U.S. Route 412 southwest of town. The highway resumes towards the south of this first endpoint before AR 358 terminates at AR 69 in south Paragould.

== Major intersections ==
Mile markers reset at concurrencies. The entire route is in Greene County.

Location	mi	km	Destinations	Notes
	0.00	0.00	AR 141 – Jonesboro, Walcott	Western terminus
	6.15	9.90	AR 351 south – Jonesboro	
Paragould	9.75	15.69	US 412	
Paragould	11.78	18.96	US 49 / AR 1 (Linwood Drive)	Eastern terminus
Paragould	Gap in route			
Paragould	0.00	0.00	US 49 / AR 1 (Linwood Drive) / McDaniel Road – Jonesboro, Paragould	Western terminus
Paragould	2.11	3.40	AR 69 (2nd Avenue) – Paragould, Bethel	Eastern terminus
1.000 mi = 1.609 km; 1.000 km = 0.621 mi
