= Greene County Tech High School =

Location
- 4601 Linwood Drive; Paragould, Greene County, Arkansas 72450; United States; 36°0′26″N 90°31′49″W

Information
- School board: Greene County Tech School Board
- School district: Greene County Tech School District
- NCES District ID: 0513080
- Oversight: Arkansas Department of Education (ADE)
- CEEB code: 041950
- NCES School ID: 051308001066
- Grades: 10–12
- Enrollment: 801 (2023-2024)
- Student to teacher ratio: 11.05
- Education system: ADE Smart Core curriculum
- Classes offered: Regular, Advanced Placement
- Campus type: Rural
- Colors: Green and gold
- Athletics conference: 5A East (2024-2026)
- Mascot: Golden eagle
- Team name: Greene County Tech Golden Eagles
- Rival: Paragould High School Cross-town rivals Jonesboro High School "Border Bowl"
- Accreditation: AdvancED (1969-)
- Feeder schools: Greene County Tech Junior High School (8–9)
- Affiliation: Arkansas Activities Association (AAA)
- Website: gctsd.k12.ar.us/o/gcths

Greene County Tech High School (GCTHS) is a comprehensive public high school located in Paragould, Arkansas, United States. It is one of two public high schools in Greene County, Arkansas, along with cross-town rival Paragould High School, and is the sole high school managed by the Greene County Tech School District. It serves as the main feeder school for Greene County Tech Junior High School.

Within Greene County, it serves the southern portion of Paragould and the municipality of Delaplaine, as well as the census-designated place of Walcott. The portion of Paragould in the district makes up 18 square miles (47 km^{2}). Within Randolph County it serves O Kean. Within Clay County it serves Peach Orchard. It also serves the unincorporated Greene County areas of Beech Grove, Evening Star, Light, and Lorado.

== History ==
In 2007 the school district closed Delaplaine High School, the other high school of the school district. Now all areas of the district are assigned to GCTHS.

== Academics ==
The assumed course of study at Greene County Tech is the Smart Core curriculum developed by the Arkansas Department of Education. Students are engaged in regular and Advanced Placement (AP) coursework and exams prior to graduation, with the opportunity for qualified students to be named honor graduates based on grade point average and additional coursework above minimum requirements. The school has been accredited by AdvancED since 1969.

== Athletics ==
The Greene County Tech High School mascot is the golden eagle and the school colors and green and gold.

For 2024-2026 the Greene County Tech Golden Eagles participate in the 5A East Conference administered by the Arkansas Activities Association (AAA). The Golden Eagles compete in interscholastic competition including baseball, basketball (boys/girls), competitive cheer, competitive dance, cross country, football, golf (boys/girls), soccer (boys/girls), softball, swimming and diving (boys/girls), track and field (boys/girls) and volleyball.

- Golf: The girls golf team are 2-time state golf champions (1982, 2009).
- Baseball: The baseball team is one of the most consistent programs in the state with 33 state tournament appearances and wins with 15 state semi-finals. The 1962 squad went undefeated at 16-0 and combined with the 1963 team for 34 consecutive wins, both state records at the time. The 1979 baseball team won 28 consecutive games.
- Cheer: The competitive cheer team won the 2008 state title in the co-ed division.

== Marching Band ==
The Greene County Tech High School's band is called the 'Greene County Tech Eagle Band'.

Their accomplishments are as follows:

- In the 2022-2023 Marching Season, they qualified for State and got 5th place in 6A. Their show was titled Only This Way Tells, written by Parker W. Long.
- In the 2023-2024 Marching Season, they qualified for State and got 3rd place in 6A. Their show was titled Recess, arranged by Evan VanDoren, with Drumline parts arranged by Joshua Huffstutler. This year was also their debut in Bands of America, in which they did not make finals.
- In the 2024-2025 Marching Season, they qualified for State and were State Champions in 5A, beating their rival Paragould High School, who had won State for last 8 years in 5A. Their show was titled Uncharted Waters, arranged by Evan VanDoren, with Percussion arranged by Michael Lemish, Ashley Ridenour, and Joshua Huffstutler. By winning state, their Head Band Director, Kim Webb, is the first female head band director in the state of Arkansas to get a state title.
