= O'Kean, Arkansas =

- Town
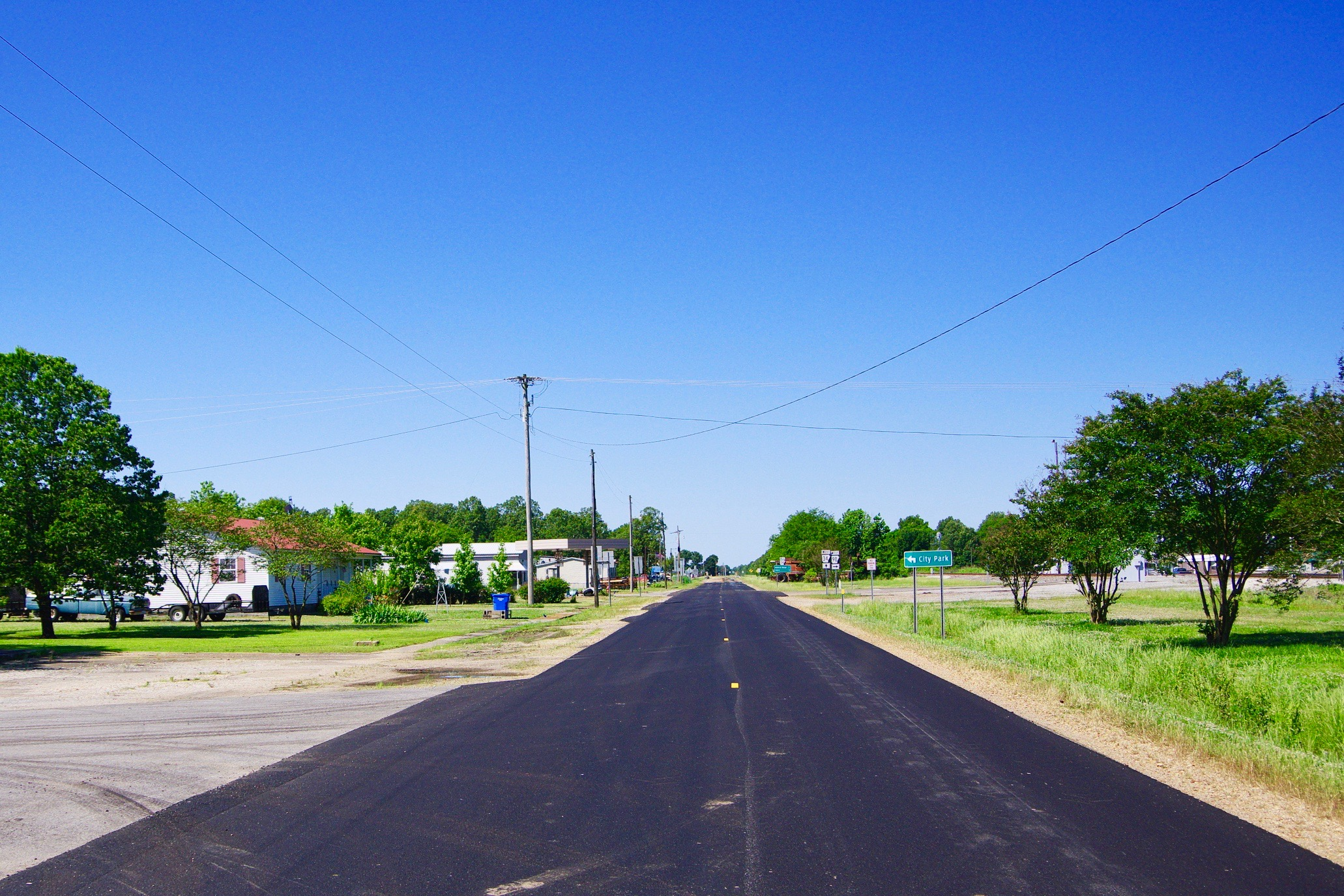
- AR 90 in O'Kean

- Location of O'Kean in Randolph County, Arkansas.
- Coordinates: 36°10′17″N 90°49′06″W
- Country: United States
- State: Arkansas
- County: Randolph

Area
  - Total: 1.02 sq mi (2.64 km^{2})
  - Land: 1.02 sq mi (2.64 km^{2})
  - Water: 0 sq mi (0.00 km^{2})
- Elevation: 269 ft (82 m)

Population (2020)
  - Total: 192
  - Estimate (2025): 193 ▲
  - Density: 188.2/sq mi (72.68/km^{2})
- Time zone: UTC-6 (Central (CST))
  - Summer (DST): UTC-5 (CDT)
- ZIP code: 72449
- Area code: 870
- FIPS code: 05-51500
- GNIS feature ID: 2407040

O'Kean is a town in Randolph County, Arkansas, United States. The population was 192 at the 2020 census.

== History ==
O’Kean was settled before the Civil War, and is named for the priest of the St. Paul’s Catholic Church, Father James O’Kean, who frequently stopped in the community en route to nearby Pocahontas. With the construction of the St. Louis, Iron Mountain and Southern Railway in the 1870s, O’Kean expanded rapidly. A railroad tie manufacturing operation was among the businesses established in the city during the period. O’Kean incorporated in 1913.

== Geography ==
O'Kean is bordered by Greene County to the east, and one mile north of Lawrence County. The town is concentrated around the intersection of Arkansas Highway 90 and Arkansas Highway 34, southeast of Pocahontas.

According to the United States Census Bureau, the town has a total area of 2.6 km^{2} (1.0 mi^{2}), all land.

=== List Of Highways ===
- Highway 34
- Highway 90

== Demographics ==
Historical population
Census	Pop.	Note	%±
1920	205		—
1930	184		−10.2%
1940	138		−25.0%
1950	165		19.6%
1960	137		−17.0%
1970	244		78.1%
1980	291		19.3%
1990	250		−14.1%
2000	201		−19.6%
2010	194		−3.5%
2020	192		−1.0%
2025 (est.)	193	▲	0.5%
U.S. Decennial Census

As of the census of 2000, there were 201 people, 85 households, and 58 families residing in the town. The population density was 77.6/km^{2} (200.5/mi^{2}). There were 93 housing units at an average density of 35.9/km^{2} (92.8/mi^{2}). The racial makeup of the town was 96.52% White, 0.50% Pacific Islander, and 2.99% from two or more races. 0.50% of the population were Hispanic or Latino of any race.

There were 85 households, out of which 25.9% had children under the age of 18 living with them, 65.9% were married couples living together, 3.5% had a female householder with no husband present, and 30.6% were non-families. 27.1% of all households were made up of individuals, and 11.8% had someone living alone who was 65 years of age or older. The average household size was 2.36 and the average family size was 2.90.

In the town, the population was spread out, with 20.4% under the age of 18, 9.0% from 18 to 24, 23.9% from 25 to 44, 31.8% from 45 to 64, and 14.9% who were 65 years of age or older. The median age was 42 years. For every 100 females, there were 91.4 males. For every 100 females age 18 and over, there were 100.0 males.

The median income for a household in the town was $24,688, and the median income for a family was $35,208. Males had a median income of $16,667 versus $16,750 for females. The per capita income for the town was $11,342. About 22.6% of families and 24.3% of the population were below the poverty line, including 34.8% of those under the age of eighteen and 9.5% of those 65 or over.

== Education ==
The town of O'Kean, along with a portion of southeast Randolph County, is located within the Greene County Tech School District. The zoned schools are in Paragould, and Greene County Tech High School is the local high school.

It was previously served by the O'Kean School District which had elementary and high school facilities. The Delaplaine School District absorbed the O'Kean district, including the elementary school, and O'Kean High School closed. In 1962 Delaplaine Elementary School took responsibility for elementary education as the O'Kean Elementary School was shuttered. Therefore when the Delaplaine district was in operation, students attended Delaplaine Elementary and Delaplaine High School. On July 1, 2004, the Delaplaine district merged into the Greene County Tech School District. In 2007 the Greene County district closed Delaplaine Schools and redirected O'Kean students to the campuses in Paragould.
