= Crowley's Ridge State Park-Bathhouse =

- U.S. National Register of Historic Places
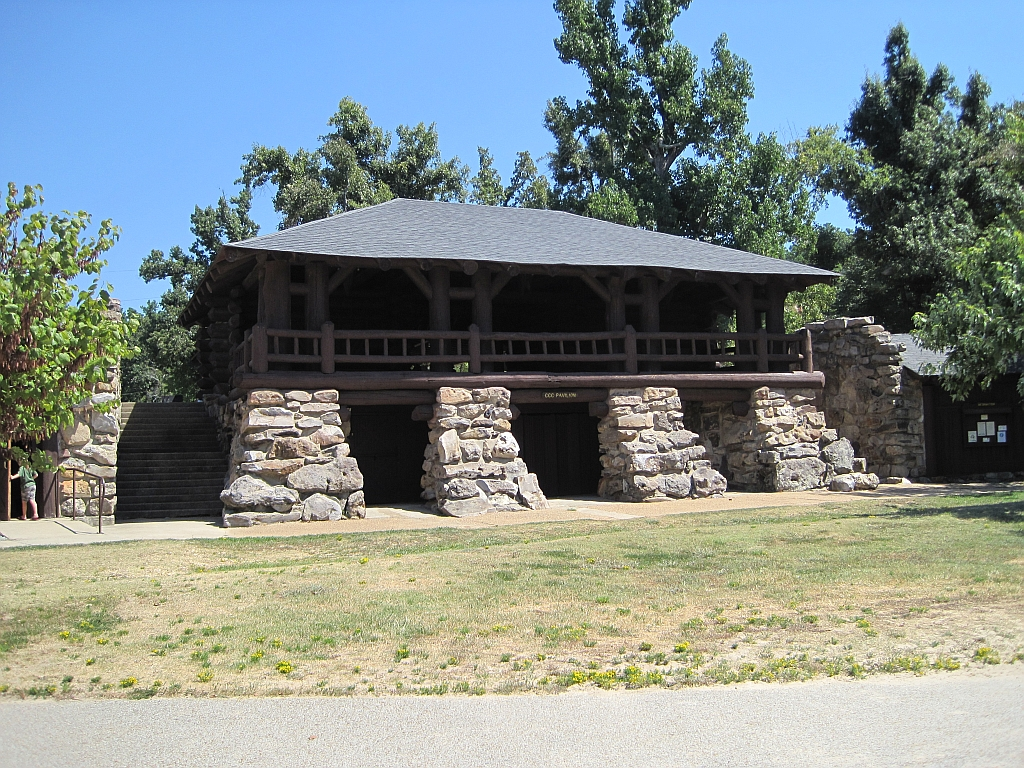

- Location within Arkansas Location within the United States
- Nearest city: Walcott, Arkansas
- Coordinates: 36°2′45″N 90°39′50″W
- Area: less than one acre
- Built: 1935
- Built by: Civilian Conservation Corps
- Architectural style: Rustic Resort
- MPS: Facilities Constructed by the CCC in Arkansas MPS
- NRHP reference No.: 92000537
- Added to NRHP: May 28, 1992

The Crowley's Ridge State Park Bathhouse is a historic recreational facility in Crowley's Ridge State Park, located in Greene County, Arkansas. It is a 1 1/2-story log structure, built on a fieldstone foundation, and is covered with a hip roof. A wood and log frame ell extends to the building's rear. The bathhouse was built c. 1935 by a crew from the Civilian Conservation Corps, and is an excellent local example of the Rustic style architecture popularized by the CCC.

The building was listed on the National Register of Historic Places in 1992.

== See also ==
- National Register of Historic Places listings in Greene County, Arkansas
