= Peach Orchard, Arkansas =

- City
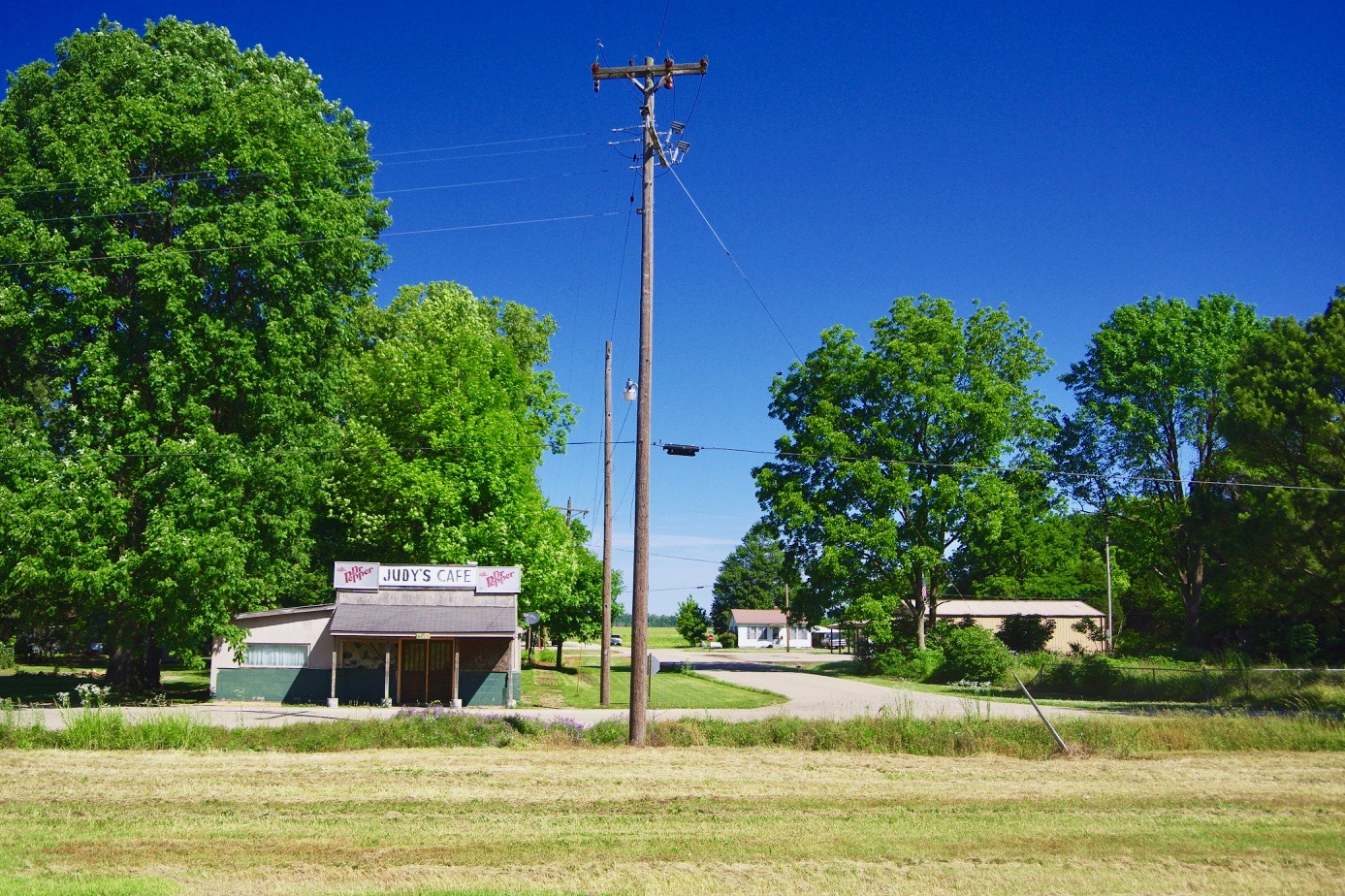
- North Main Street

- Location of Peach Orchard in Clay County, Arkansas.
- Coordinates: 36°16′52″N 90°39′39″W
- Country: United States
- State: Arkansas
- County: Clay

Area
  - Total: 1.03 sq mi (2.67 km^{2})
  - Land: 1.03 sq mi (2.67 km^{2})
  - Water: 0 sq mi (0.00 km^{2})
- Elevation: 285 ft (87 m)

Population (2020)
  - Total: 105
  - Estimate (2025): 103 ▼
  - Density: 101.9/sq mi (39.36/km^{2})
- Time zone: UTC-6 (Central (CST))
  - Summer (DST): UTC-5 (CDT)
- ZIP code: 72453
- Area code: 870
- FIPS code: 05-54140
- GNIS feature ID: 2404493

Peach Orchard is a city in Clay County, Arkansas, United States. As of the 2020 census, Peach Orchard had a population of 105.

== History ==
Peach Orchard is rooted in an estate known as "Petit Baril," established by French explorer Pierre Le Mieux in the early 19th century. Local English-speakers were calling it "Peach Orchard" by the time Le Mieux sold the estate in 1816. A trading post operated at Peach Orchard during the mid-19th century, and was frequently raided by guerrilla forces during the Civil War.

The construction of the St. Louis, Iron Mountain and Southern Railway in the 1870s brought increased development to Peach Orchard, focused primarily on the railroad and the timber industry. A post office opened in 1873, and a depot was constructed. The city incorporated in 1910.

== Geography ==
Peach Orchard is located southwest of Corning along Arkansas Highway 90, between Knobel and Delaplaine.

According to the United States Census Bureau, the town has a total area of 1.0 square mile (2.6 km^{2}), all land.

== Demographics ==
Historical population
Census	Pop.	Note	%±
1920	484		—
1930	361		−25.4%
1940	374		3.6%
1950	327		−12.6%
1960	348		6.4%
1970	256		−26.4%
1980	243		−5.1%
1990	197		−18.9%
2000	195		−1.0%
2010	135		−30.8%
2020	105		−22.2%
2025 (est.)	103	▼	−1.9%
U.S. Decennial Census

As of the census of 2000, there were 195 people, 78 households, and 56 families residing in the town. The population density was 197.9 inhabitants per square mile (76.4/km^{2}). There were 97 housing units at an average density of 98.5 per square mile (38.0/km^{2}). The racial makeup of the town was 97.44% White, 2.56% from other races. 2.56% of the population were Hispanic or Latino of any race.

There were 78 households, out of which 32.1% had children under the age of 18 living with them, 57.7% were married couples living together, 9.0% had a female householder with no husband present, and 28.2% were non-families. 28.2% of all households were made up of individuals, and 17.9% had someone living alone who was 65 years of age or older. The average household size was 2.50 and the average family size was 2.98.

In the town, the population was spread out, with 25.1% under the age of 18, 6.2% from 18 to 24, 28.2% from 25 to 44, 23.6% from 45 to 64, and 16.9% who were 65 years of age or older. The median age was 40 years. For every 100 females, there were 89.3 males. For every 100 females age 18 and over, there were 89.6 males.

The median income for a household in the town was $30,000, and the median income for a family was $25,750. Males had a median income of $25,833 versus $20,500 for females. The per capita income for the town was $11,051. About 24.5% of families and 18.3% of the population were below the poverty line, including 5.6% of those under the age of eighteen and 42.3% of those 65 or over.

== Economy ==
In 2011 there was no restaurant even though there used to be one such establishment and two grocery stores.

== Government and infrastructure ==
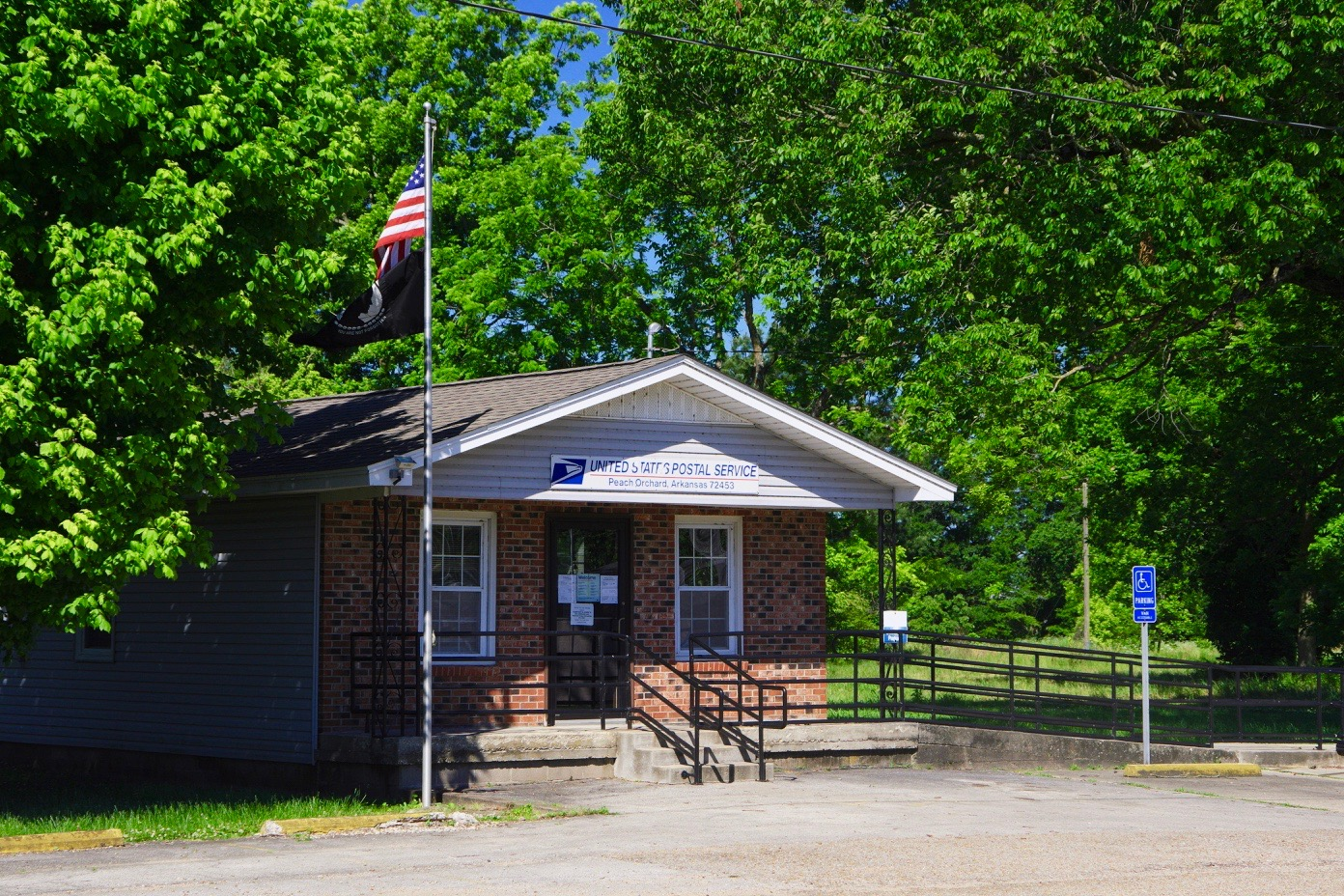
Post Office

The community has a post office made of brick, operated by the U.S. Postal Service. In 2011 the postal agency considered closing the post office.

== Education ==
Peach Orchard is in an exclave of the Greene County Tech School District of Paragould, surrounded by territory of the Corning School District. Its zoned high school is Greene County Tech High School.

Previously Peach Orchard had its own schools. At some point they consolidated into the Delaplaine School District of Delaplaine. That district operated Delaplaine High School.

In 2004 the Delaplaine school district consolidated into the Greene County Tech school district. In 2006 the Delaplaine schools closed and the students were moved to the Greene County schools.
