= Crowley's Ridge State Park =

State park in Arkansas

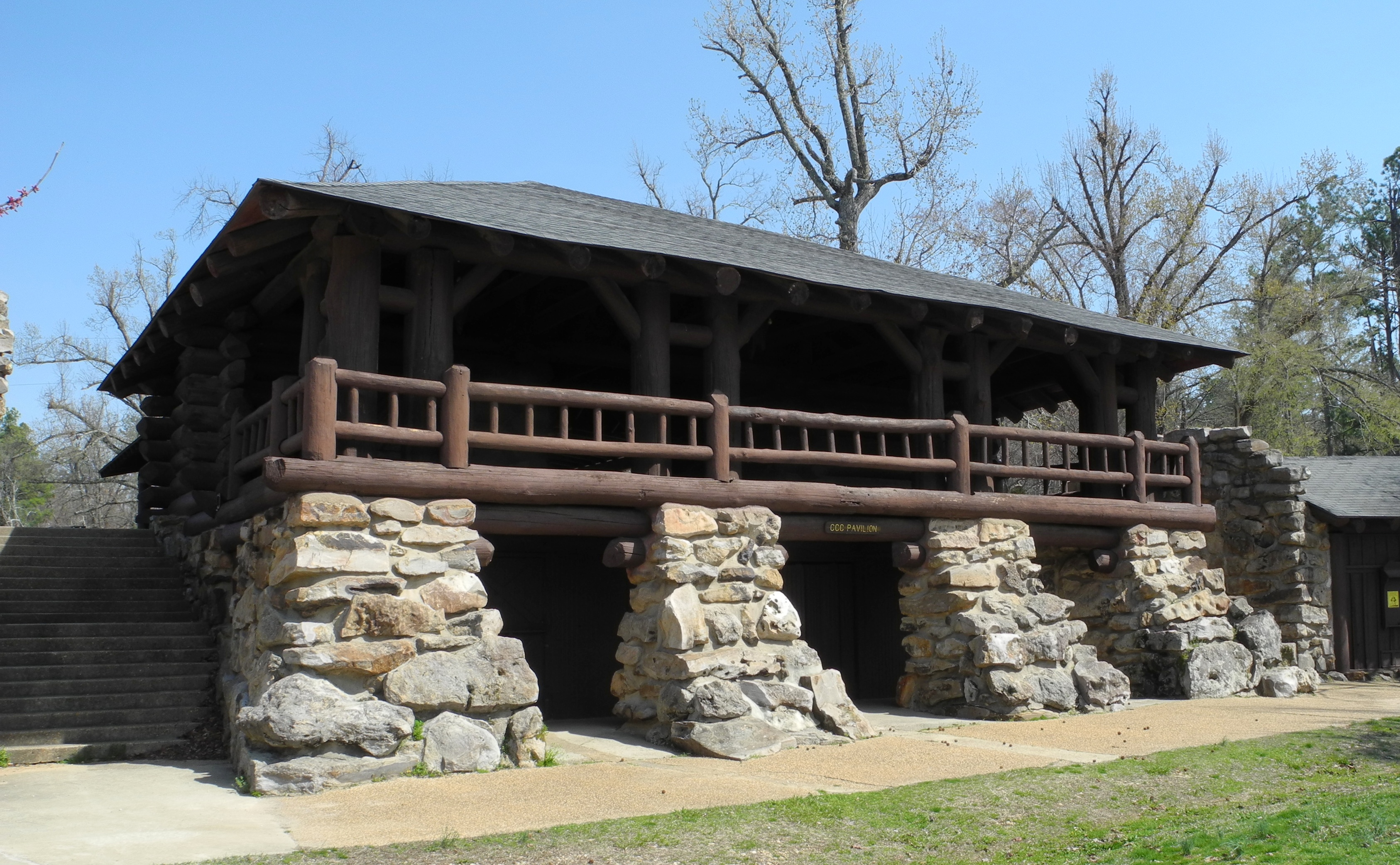
- Civilian Conservation Corps pavilion

- Location within Arkansas Location within the United States
- Interactive map of Crowley's Ridge State Park
- Location: Greene County, Arkansas, United States
- Coordinates: 36°02′39″N 90°39′59″W
- Area: 291 acres (118 ha)
- Established: June 21, 1937
- Administrator: Arkansas Department of Parks, Heritage and Tourism
- Website: Official website
- Arkansas State Parks

Crowley's Ridge State Park is a 291-acre (118 ha) Arkansas state park in Greene County, Arkansas in the United States atop Crowley's Ridge. Located on the former homesite of pioneer Benjamin Crowley, the park contains many excellent examples of the work done by the Civilian Conservation Corps in the 1930s. One of Arkansas's most popular state parks, the parks is bisected by Crowley's Ridge Parkway, a National Scenic Byway. The site became a state park in 1933 in an effort to honor Crowley and the heritage of the Crowley's Ridge area.

== Recreation ==
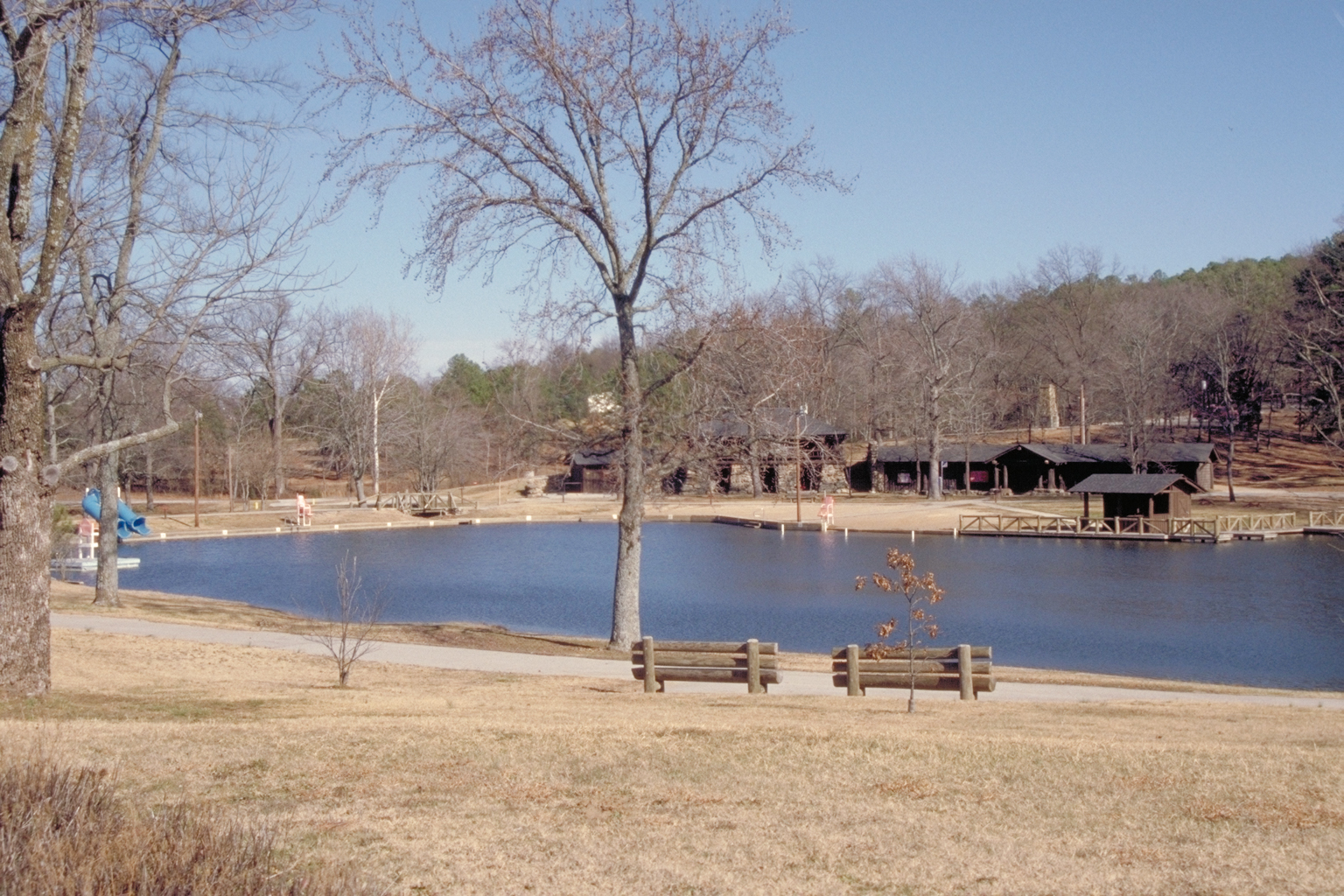
Lake Ponder

The park was originally constructed in the 1930s by the Civilian Conservation Corps and the original stone and log structures give the park a rustic feel. The park offers a 31-acre (13 ha) fishing lake originally constructed by the Arkansas National Guard and which is well stocked with channel catfish and largemouth bass by the Arkansas Game and Fish Commission. The park also has a 3-acre (1.2 ha) spring-fed swimming lake which is one of the most popular swimming areas in Arkansas.

The park has modern cabins with kitchens, picnic areas, a dining hall, snack bar, and other amenities. The park also provides group accommodations for up to 60 person groups. Five bunk cabins, four fully modern duplex-style cabins with kitchens, 18 Class B and 8 tent sites serve as lodging facilities.

== National Register of Historic Places ==
The bathhouse, bridge, comfort station, and dining hall are separately listed on the National Register of Historic Places:

- Crowley's Ridge State Park-Bathhouse
- Crowley's Ridge State Park-Bridge
- Crowley's Ridge State Park-Comfort Station
- Crowley's Ridge State Park-Dining Hall
