= Knob School =

- Knob School-Masonic Lodge
- U.S. National Register of Historic Places
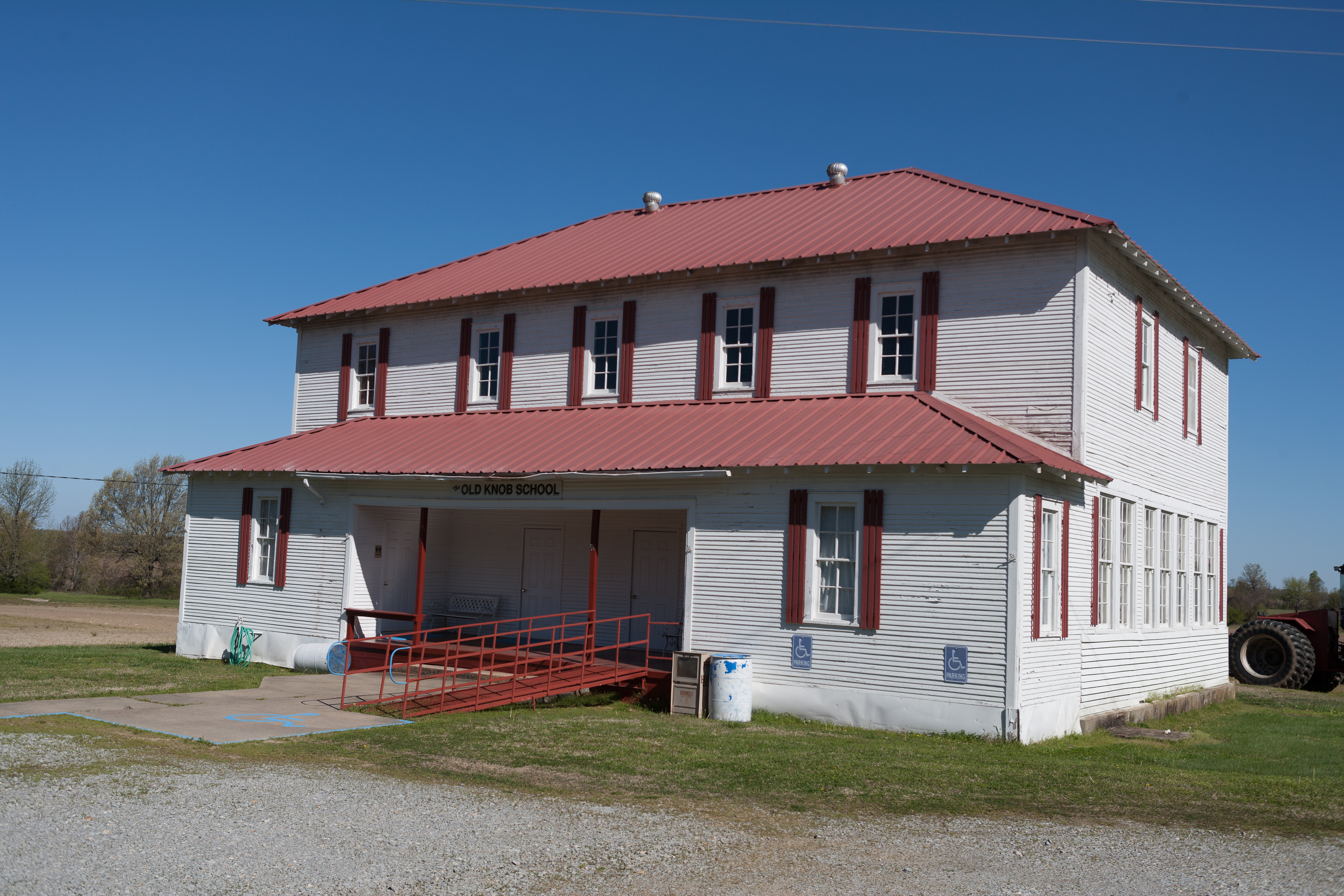
- The Old Knob School in April 2016

- Location within Arkansas Location within the United States
- Location: AR 141, Knob, Arkansas
- Coordinates: 36.2816°N 90.4501°W
- Area: 0.9 acres (0.36 ha)
- Architect: Tump Cagle
- Architectural style: Bungalow/Craftsman, Vernacular Craftsman
- NRHP reference No.: 91000679
- Added to NRHP: May 30, 1991

The Knob School, also called the Masonic Lodge, is a historic school and Masonic lodge building on Arkansas Highway 141 in Knob, Arkansas. It is a two-story wood-frame structure with a hip roof, and a single-story extension to the front with a hip roof and a recessed porch. The building has vernacular Craftsman style, with extended eaves supported by exposed brackets. It was built in 1923 to serve the dual purpose of providing the community with school facilities (located on the first floor) and space for Masonic lodge meetings (on the second floor).

The building was listed on the National Register of Historic Places in 1991 as Knob School-Masonic Lodge.

== See also ==
- National Register of Historic Places listings in Clay County, Arkansas
- List of Masonic buildings in the United States
