= Beech Grove, Arkansas =

- Unincorporated community
- Location within Arkansas Location within the United States
- Coordinates: 36°10′20″N 90°37′09″W
- Country: United States
- State: Arkansas
- County: Greene
- Elevation: 305 ft (93 m)
- Time zone: UTC-6 (Central (CST))
  - Summer (DST): UTC-5 (CDT)
- ZIP code: 72412
- Area code: 870
- GNIS feature ID: 76284

Beech Grove is an unincorporated community in Greene County, Arkansas, United States. Beech Grove is located on Arkansas Highway 141, 11 miles (18 km) northwest of Paragould. Beech Grove has a post office with ZIP code 72412.
