= Greene County Tech School District =

Public school district based in Paragould, Arkansas, United States

Greene County Technical School District

Location
- 5413 West Kings Hwy; Paragould, Arkansas 72450 United States

District information
- Motto: Investing In The Future...One Student At A Time.
- Grades: PK–12
- Accreditation: Arkansas Department of Education
- Schools: 5
- NCES District ID: 0513080

Students and staff
- Students: 3,641
- Teachers: 243.68 (on FTE basis)
- Staff: 531.68 (on FTE basis)
- Student–teacher ratio: 14.94
- District mascot: Golden eagle
- Colors: Green; Gold

Other information
- Website: www.gctsd.k12.ar.us

Green County Technical School District (Greene County Tech.) is a public school district based in Paragould, Arkansas, United States. The school district encompasses 344.38 square miles (891.9 km^{2}) of land, including portions of Greene, Randolph, Craighead, and Clay Counties.

Within Greene County it serves the southern portion of Paragould and the municipality of Delaplaine, as well as the census-designated place of Walcott. The portion of Paragould in the district makes up 18 square miles (47 km^{2}). Within Randolph County it serves O Kean. Within Clay County it serves Peach Orchard. It also serves the unincorporated Greene County areas of Beech Grove, Evening Star, Light, Lorado, and Mounds.

The district and its five schools provide comprehensive education for more than 3,600 pre-kindergarten through grade 12 students and are accredited by the Arkansas Department of Education (ADE).

== History ==
The history dates back to 1926, when community leader W. A. "Will" Branch was instrumental in recognizing the need for rural high schools in Greene County. Called "The Father of School Consolidation", he then worked to unite small districts into a strong, sustainable system. It was established on September 17, 1947, and originated from the Greene County Rural School District. On July 1, 2004, the Delaplaine School District consolidated into the district.

== Schools ==
- Greene County Tech High School, located in Paragould and serving more than 699 students in grades 10 through 12.
- Greene County Tech Junior High School, located in Paragould and serving more than 500 students in grades 8 and 9.
- Greene County Tech Middle School, located in Paragould and serving more than 900 students in grades 6 through 7.
- Greene County Tech Intermediate School, located in Paragould and serving more than 500 students in grades 4 and 5.
- Greene County Tech Elementary School, located in Paragould and serving more than 900 students in grades 2 through 3.
- Greene County Tech Primary School, located in Paragould and serving more than 900 students in pre-kindergarten through grade 1.

The district previously operated Delaplaine Elementary School (K-6) and Delaplaine High School (7-12) after the merger with the Delaplaine district; these schools served the area of the former Delaplaine district. The Delaplaine schools closed in 2007. Delaplaine mayor Larry Myrick stated that the community lost children with families after the school stopped operations.

== See also ==
- Marmaduke School District
- Paragould School District
