= Delaplaine High School =

High school located in Delaplaine, Arkansas

Coordinates: 36.2340°N 90.7227°W

- Arkansas; United States

Delaplaine High School was a middle school and senior high school in Delaplaine, Arkansas. It was initially controlled by the Delaplaine School District, which merged into the Greene County Tech School District on July 1, 2004. After the consolidation it was operated by the GCT school district and served students from the former Delaplaine School District boundary. It served Delaplaine, O'Kean, and Peach Orchard.

== History ==
It served O'Kean since 1948, when the O'Kean district merged into the Delaplaine district. It also served Peach Orchard after that respective school district merged into the Delaplaine school district.

The Delaplaine campus had a total of 245 students at the time of its closure. All seven members of the Greene County Tech board approved the closure due to the funds that came with the merger of the Delaplaine district drying up, financial issues, and more stringent Arkansas state standards.

The school, along with Delaplaine Elementary, closed in 2007. Delaplaine mayor Larry Myrick stated that the community lost children with families after the school stopped operations.

Now all areas of the school district are assigned to Greene County Tech High School in Paragould.
