= Samuel Johnson Hilburn =

American politician

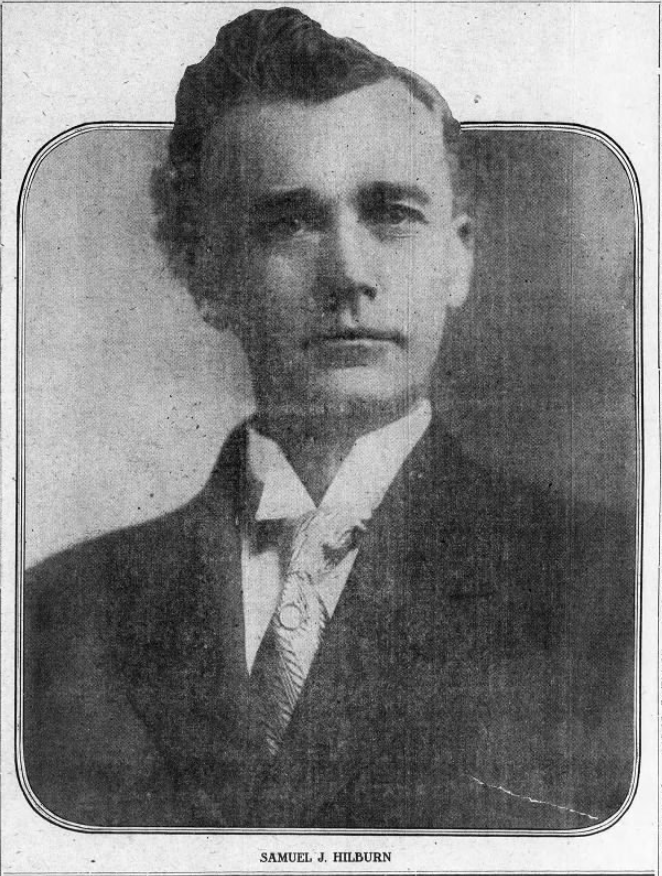
- Samuel Johnson Hilburn (circa 1912)

Florida House of Representatives
- In office 1909–1910

Florida State Senate
- In office 1911–1912

Florida State Senate
- In office 1933–1934

Personal details
- Born: May 30, 1869 Gainesville, Arkansas, US
- Died: September 27, 1943 (aged 74) Palatka, Florida, US
- Party: Democratic

Samuel Johnson Hilburn (May 30, 1869 – September 27, 1943) was a lawyer and state legislator in Florida. He served in the Florida House of Representatives and the Florida Senate.

== Early and personal life and education ==
He was born May 30, 1869, in Gainesville, Arkansas, and spent his early life on a farm. Hilburn's brother was Rev. J. P. Hilburn.

After high school he went on to obtain a teaching certificate and taught for three years before enrolling at Centenary College. He obtained his law degree from Cumberland University in 1894 and was admitted to the bar in Wilson County, Tennessee.

Hilburn married Jessie Moncrief from Lake City two years after moving to Palatka, Florida.

Hilburn bought the home built and owned by Marcus Loeb, who relocated to Atlanta.

He was a member of the Royal Arch Masonry and also served as a grand chancellor of the Knights of Pythias.

== Career ==
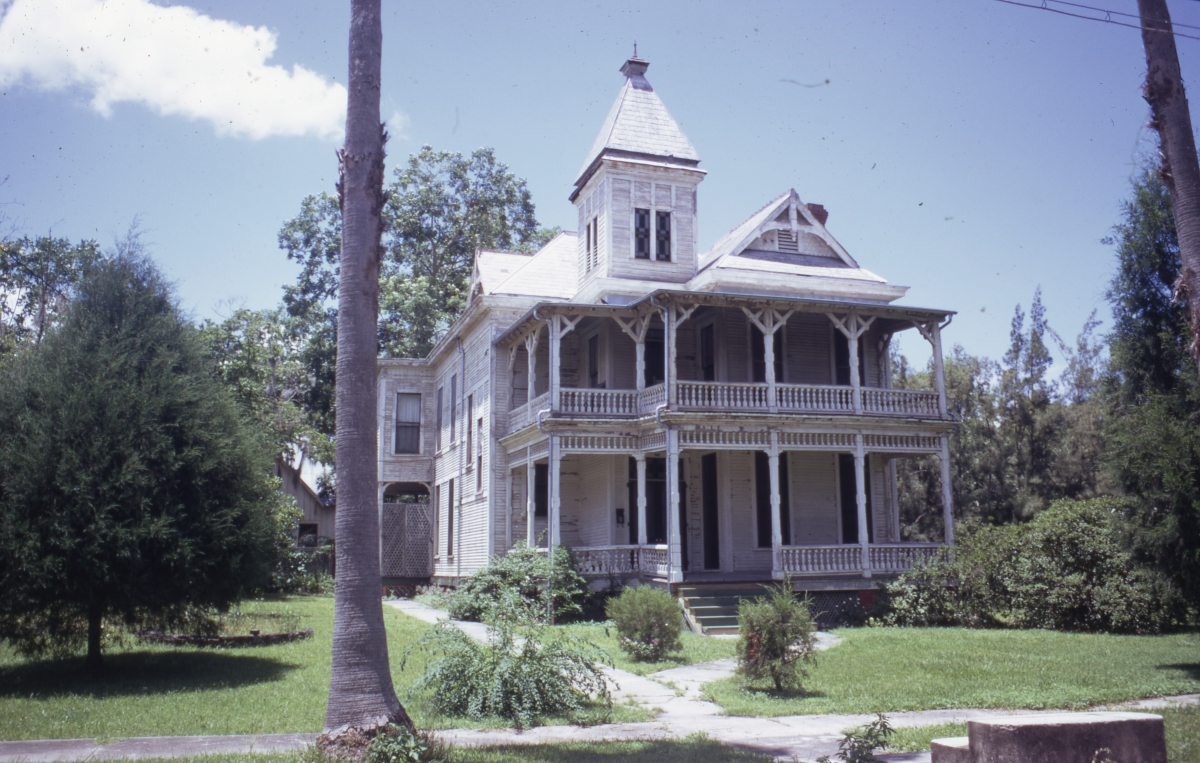
Marcus Loeb / Samuel J. Hilburn House in Palatka

After obtaining the bar he moved to Palatka, Florida, and became the city attorney, a position he served for eleven years. He was also chairman of the Putnam County school board for seven years. In 1900 he was a Democratic presidential elector.

He shared a partnership in a law firm with congressman Robert Wyche Davis until they dissolved the company for business reason in 1904.

Hilbert was elected to the Florida House of Representatives in early 1909 and took his seat when the session started on April 5, 1909, representing Putnam County. While in the house he was noted for his support for state wide prohibition. He had not been serving long before he was being urged to run for congress and challenge the sitting congressman Frank Clark, and the rumours persisted for months with Hilburn refusing to commit. In October he finally declared that he would not run due to his law firm partner falling seriously sick and Hilburn having to "do the work of two men".

After serving one term in the house he then was elected to serve in the state senate in 1911. He resigned from his seat in the senate to run for congress but lost by 384 votes of around 25,000 cast. In 1933 he was elected back to the senate and served the 26th district. He served until 1934 when he lost to H. S. McKenzie.

In 1915 he was appointed by Governor Holland to be a judge in the new circuit court. In June 2015 he presided over the procedural open and adjourn session to comply with the law of fixed terms but the docket was clear of cases. However the Florida Supreme Court took a case about his circuit judgeship and whether it was constitutional and invalidated the act before he heard any cases.

He was involved in a tax dispute. He was appointed to be a member of the Florida racing commission by Governor Fred P. Cone and re-appointed by his successor Spessard Holland.

He was dean of the Palatka bar association. He donated 80 acres to Southern College in Sutherland, Florida, predecessor of Florida Southern College. He was attacked by a wild turkey as he prepared to butcher a turkey hen outside his home. He owned substantial property.

== Death ==
Hilburn bought the home built and owned by Marcus Loeb who relocated to Atlanta, it is extant.

He died aged 74 in Palatka, Florida, on September 27, 1843, from a heart attack. He is buried in the West View Cemetery in Palatkas. The Putnam County Bar Association had a resolution to honor him for his many years service to the association as president as well as for his service to the community.
