= Arkansas Highway 351 =

State highway in Arkansas, United States

Highway 351

Route information
- Maintained by ArDOT
- Existed: November 1966–present

Section 1
- Length: 0.92 mi (1,480 m)
- South end: Access Road in Jonesboro
- North end: AR 18 in Jonesboro

Section 2
- Length: 13.87 mi (22.32 km)
- South end: Airport Road in Jonesboro
- North end: AR 358 near Finch

Location
- Country: United States
- State: Arkansas
- Counties: Craighead, Greene

Highway system
- Arkansas Highway System; Interstate; US; State; Business; Spurs; Suffixed; Scenic; Heritage
← AR 350	→ AR 352

Highway 351 (AR 351, Ark. 351, and Hwy. 351) is a designation for two state highways in Northeast Arkansas. One route 0.92 miles (1.48 km) in Jonesboro begins at the Interstate 555/US Highway 63 (I-555/US 63) frontage road and runs north to Highway 18 as Industrial Drive. A second route of 13.87 miles (22.32 km) begins at Airport Road and runs north to Highway 358. Between Jonesboro and the northern terminus, the route is designated as part of the Crowley's Ridge Parkway, a National Scenic Byway, and two Civil War trails under the Arkansas Heritage Trails System. Both routes are maintained by the Arkansas State Highway and Transportation Department (AHTD).

== Route description ==
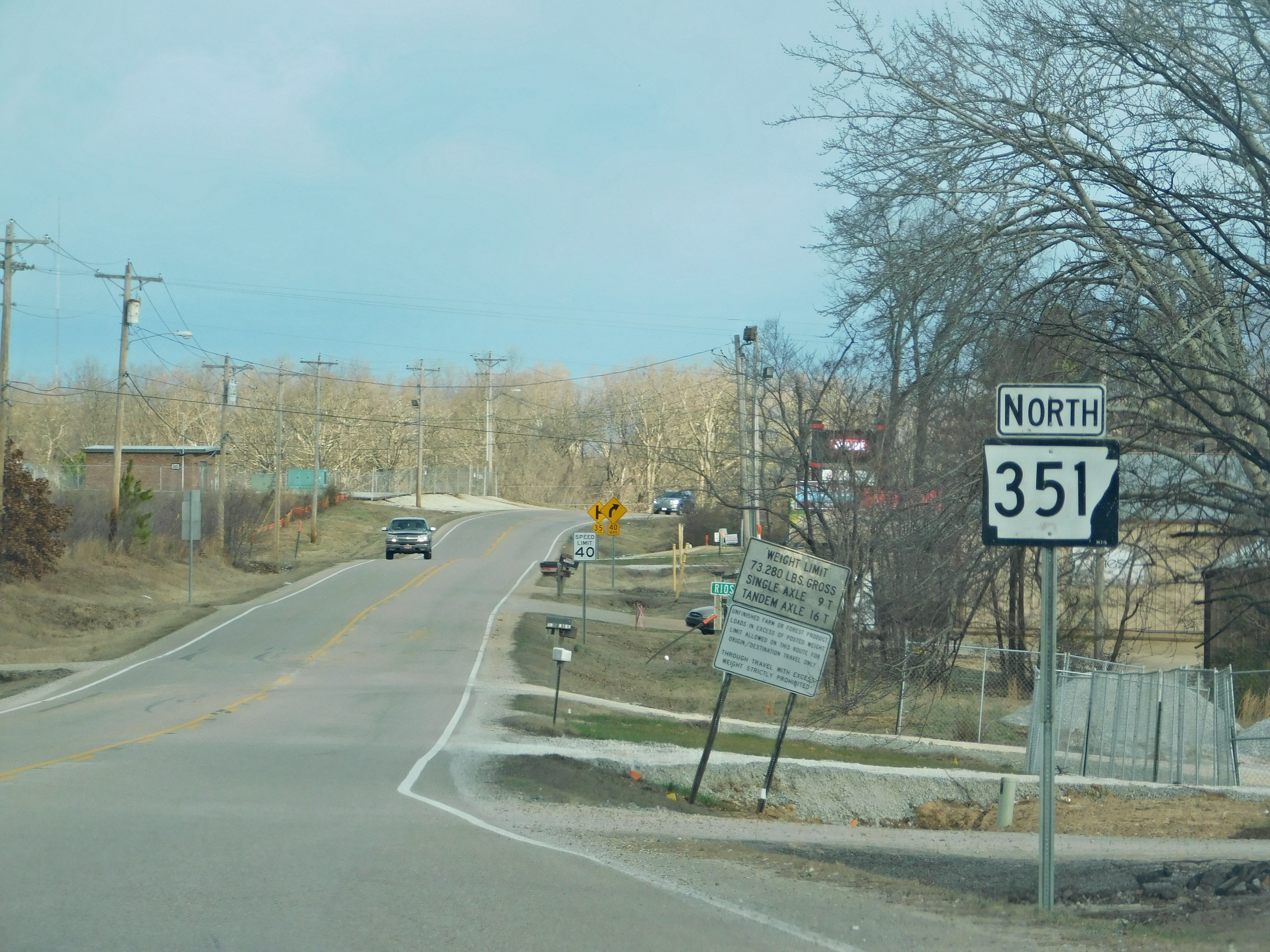
AR 351 in Jonesboro

=== Industrial Drive ===
The route begins at the north frontage road for Interstate 555/U.S. Route 63 in Jonesboro, the most populous city in Northeast Arkansas. The route runs due north to a skewed intersection with US 63B before terminating at Highway 18.

=== Jonesboro to Greene County ===
AR 351 begins at Airport Road in Jonesboro east of the BNSF railroad tracks, near Jonesboro Municipal Airport. The route runs northeast before overlapping US 49/AR 1. Highway 351 proceeds to run north to terminate at AR 358.

Between US 49/Highway 1 western junction and County Road 766, the route is part of the Crowley's Ridge Parkway, a National Scenic Byway.

Two Civil War Trail designations follow Highway 351 between Jonesboro and Highway 358; the Steele's Movements trail during the Second Phase Pea Ridge Campaign, and the Davidson's Approach during the Little Rock Campaign. Both designations represent Highway 351's historic prominence as a main north-south route between Paragould and Jonesboro.

== Major intersections ==
County	Location	mi	km	Destinations	Notes
Craighead	Jonesboro	0.00	0.00	Access Road	Southern terminus
Craighead	Jonesboro	0.30	0.48	US 63B (Nettleton Avenue)	
Craighead	Jonesboro	0.92	1.48	AR 18 (Highland Drive) – Jonesboro, Monette	Northern terminus
Craighead	Jonesboro	Gap in route			
Craighead	Jonesboro	0.00	0.00	Airport Road	Southern terminus
Craighead	Jonesboro	2.50– 0.00	4.02– 0.00	US 49 (Johnson Avenue) / AR 1 / Crowley's Ridge Pkwy. south	Begin overlap with Crowleys Ridge Pkwy
Craighead		5.23	8.42	CR 766 west (New Haven Church Road) / Crowley's Ridge Pkwy. north	End overlap with Crowleys Ridge Pkwy
Greene		11.37	18.30	AR 358 – Paragould	Northern terminus
1.000 mi = 1.609 km; 1.000 km = 0.621 mi: Concurrency terminus
