= Fontaine, Arkansas =

- Unincorporated community
- Location within Arkansas Location within the United States
- Coordinates: 36°00′2″N 90°48′48″W
- Country: United States
- State: Arkansas
- County: Greene
- Township: Shady Grove
- Elevation: 262 ft (80 m)
- Time zone: UTC-6 (Central (CST))
  - Summer (DST): UTC-5 (CDT)
- ZIP code: 72450
- Area code: 870
- GNIS feature ID: 76944

Fontaine (formerly Fontain) is an unincorporated community in Shady Grove Township, Greene County, Arkansas, United States. It is located at the western terminus of Arkansas Highway 168 at Arkansas Highway 228.

== See also ==
- List of U.S. place names of French origin
