= Gainesville, Arkansas =

Unincorporated community in Arkansas, US

- Unincorporated community
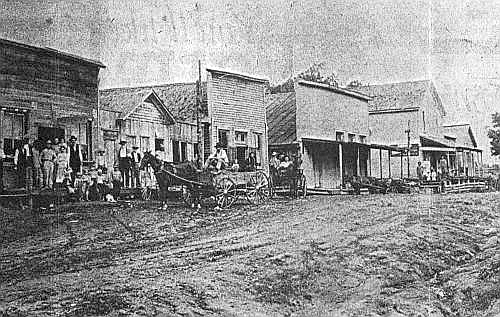
- Gainesville (1914)

- Location within Arkansas Location within the United States
- Coordinates: 36°09′53″N 90°30′38″W
- Country: United States
- State: Arkansas
- County: Greene
- Elevation: 335 ft (102 m)
- Time zone: UTC-6 (Central (CST))
  - Summer (DST): UTC-5 (CDT)
- GNIS feature ID: 57784

Gainesville is an unincorporated community in Greene County, Arkansas, United States. Once a thriving settlement and county seat, little remains today of the former community.

== History ==
In 1840, the county voted to move the county seat to this location. It was thereafter called "Gainesville", because "it gained the county seat".

The settlement was located on an improved road leading to Helena, Arkansas.

On June 28, 1861, the 5th Arkansas Infantry Regiment of the Confederate Army was organized at Gainesville.

Gainesville had a hotel in 1873 called the Snodgrass. In 1876, Gainesville began building an elementary school and high school.

The Press Democrat was established at Gainesville in 1878. It moved to Paragould in 1882. The Solophone Events was also established at Gainesville, and in 1890, it too moved to Paragould.

Prior to the 1880s, Gainesville was the largest settlement in Greene County, with a population of about 230.

== Decline ==
In the early 1880s, two railways were constructed south of Gainesville, running through Paragould. As the new railway town grew, Gainesville began to decline.

The county seat was moved to Paragould following an election in 1884.

In 1892, fire destroyed most of Gainesville's business section.

== Notable people ==
- Walter Garrett Riddick, U.S. federal judge
- Samuel Johnson Hilburn lawyer and state legislator in Florida
