= Crowley's Ridge State Park Bridge =

- U.S. National Register of Historic Places
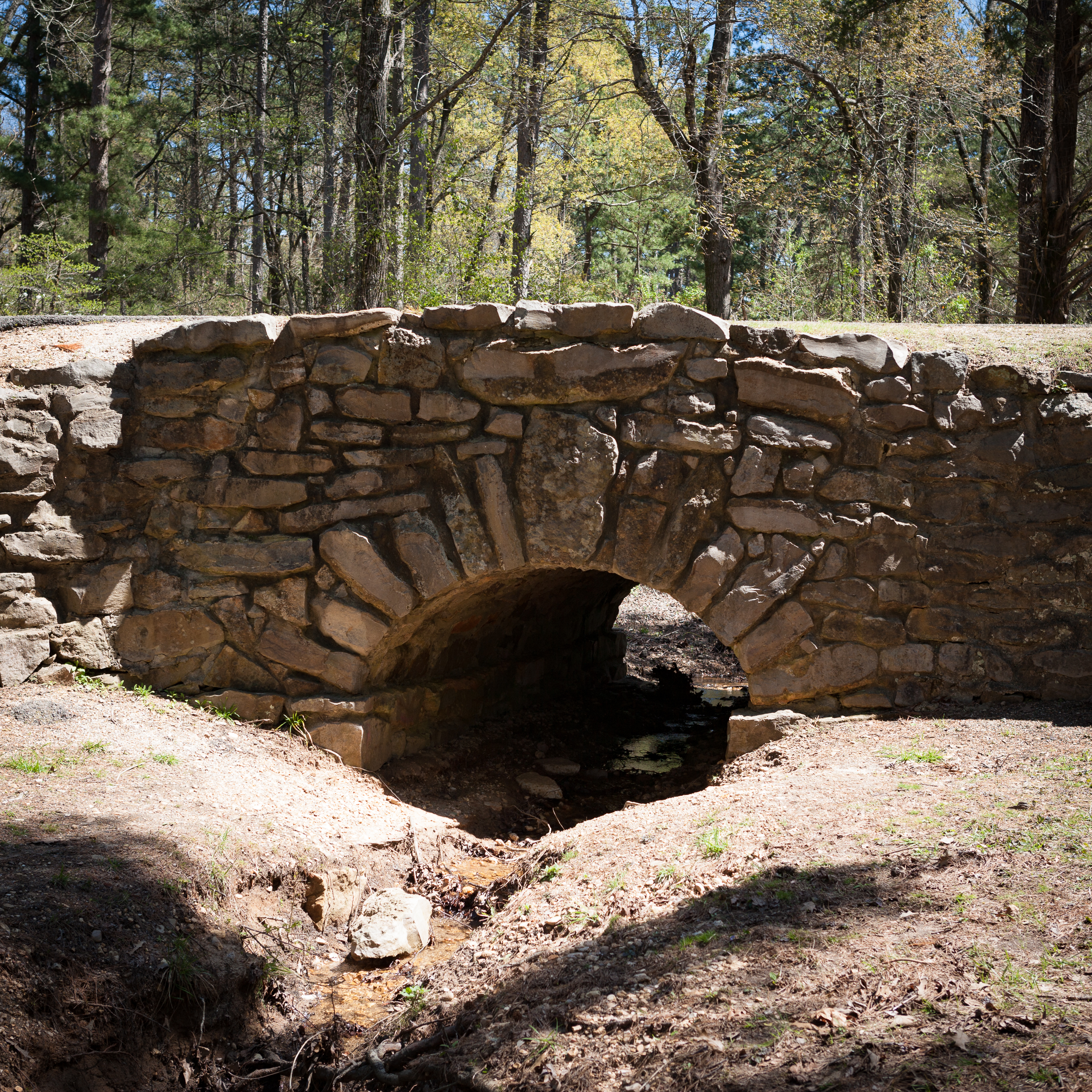

- Location within Arkansas Location within the United States
- Nearest city: Walcott, Arkansas
- Coordinates: 36°2′42″N 90°39′47″W
- Area: less than one acre
- Built: 1935
- Built by: Civilian Conservation Corps
- Architectural style: Rustic Resort
- MPS: Facilities Constructed by the CCC in Arkansas MPS
- NRHP reference No.: 92000540
- Added to NRHP: May 28, 1992

The Crowley's Ridge State Park Bridge is a historic masonry stone arch bridge in Crowley's Ridge State Park, near Walcott, Arkansas. The bridge carries the main access road to the park across a drainage ditch. It is a rusticated stone structure, about 40 feet (12 m) long, that was built c. 1935 by crews of the Civilian Conservation Corps (CCC) that were developing the park. It is one of several CCC-built structures still standing in the park, and is a well-built example of the rustic architecture popularized by the CCC.

The bridge was listed on the National Register of Historic Places in 1992.

== See also ==
- National Register of Historic Places listings in Greene County, Arkansas
- List of bridges on the National Register of Historic Places in Arkansas
