= Knob, Arkansas =

Unincorporated community in Arkansas, US

Coordinates: 36°16′53″N 90°26′53″W

Knob, Arkansas is an unincorporated community in Clay County, Arkansas. It is the location of the Knob School-Masonic Lodge, which is listed on the National Register of Historic Places.
