= Cotton Belt, Arkansas =

Unincorporated community in Arkansas, US

Coordinates: 36°05′35″N 90°27′42″W

Cotton Belt is an unincorporated community in Greene County, Arkansas, United States.

Cotton Belt is named for the St. Louis Southwestern Railway's nickname, which is "Cotton Belt". The mainline of that railroad passed just east of Cotton Belt, Arkansas.

== See also ==
- Cotton Belt (region)
