= Paragould School District =

School district in Arkansas, United States

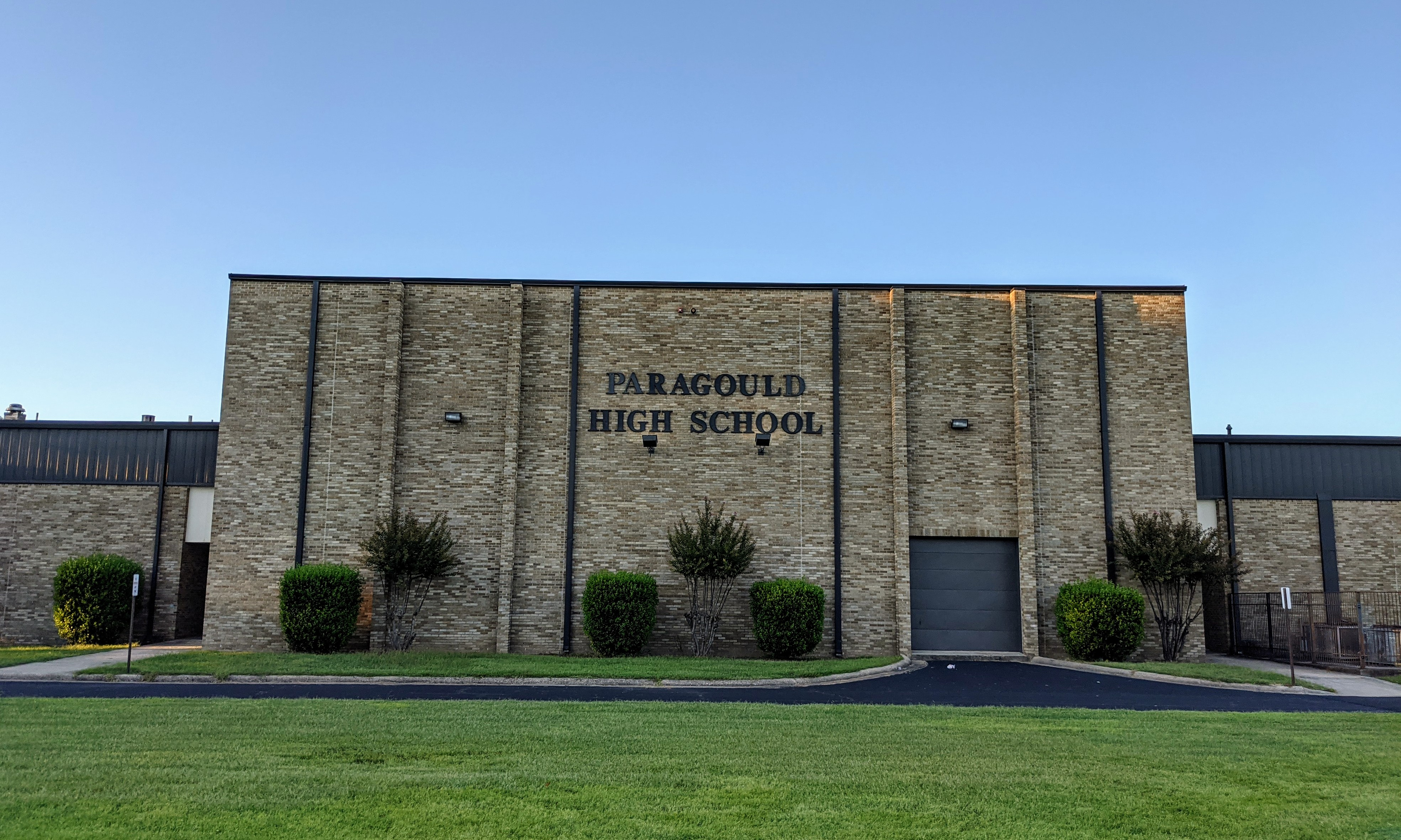
Paragould High School

Paragould School District is a public school district headquartered in Paragould, Arkansas. It serves the northern portion of Paragould and Oak Grove Heights.

The district includes numerous campuses, including the Paragould Secondary Complex (which includes Paragould High School and Paragould Junior High School), the Oak Grove Heights campus (which includes Oak Grove Middle School and Oak Grove Elementary School), Woodrow Wilson Elementary School, Baldwin Elementary School, a School of the 21st Century campus which includes pre-Elementary school education and care, Central School of Greene County which provides alternative education options for youth, and a separate administration complex which houses the office of the superintendent among others. The administration complex will be moving to an outlot of the Paragould Secondary Complex pending completion of the new building.

In 2005 construction was completed on a football/soccer stadium and fieldhouse. In 2004 a new Science and Technology Center opened on campus, housing science and technology classes for the High School.

== History ==
Prior to August 26, 1957, the former Paragould district sent, via contract, high school-aged African-American children to Booker T. Washington High School in Jonesboro, Arkansas, which was operated by the Jonesboro School District. On that day the Jonesboro district's board of trustees ended the contract.

The Northeast Arkansas School District was formed on July 1, 1985, by the merger of the former Paragould School District with the Oak Grove School District. On July 1, 1994, the Stanford School District merged into the Northeast Arkansas district. By 1997 the name of the new district became the Paragould district.

== See also ==
- Greene County Tech School District
- Marmaduke School District
