= Paragould High School =

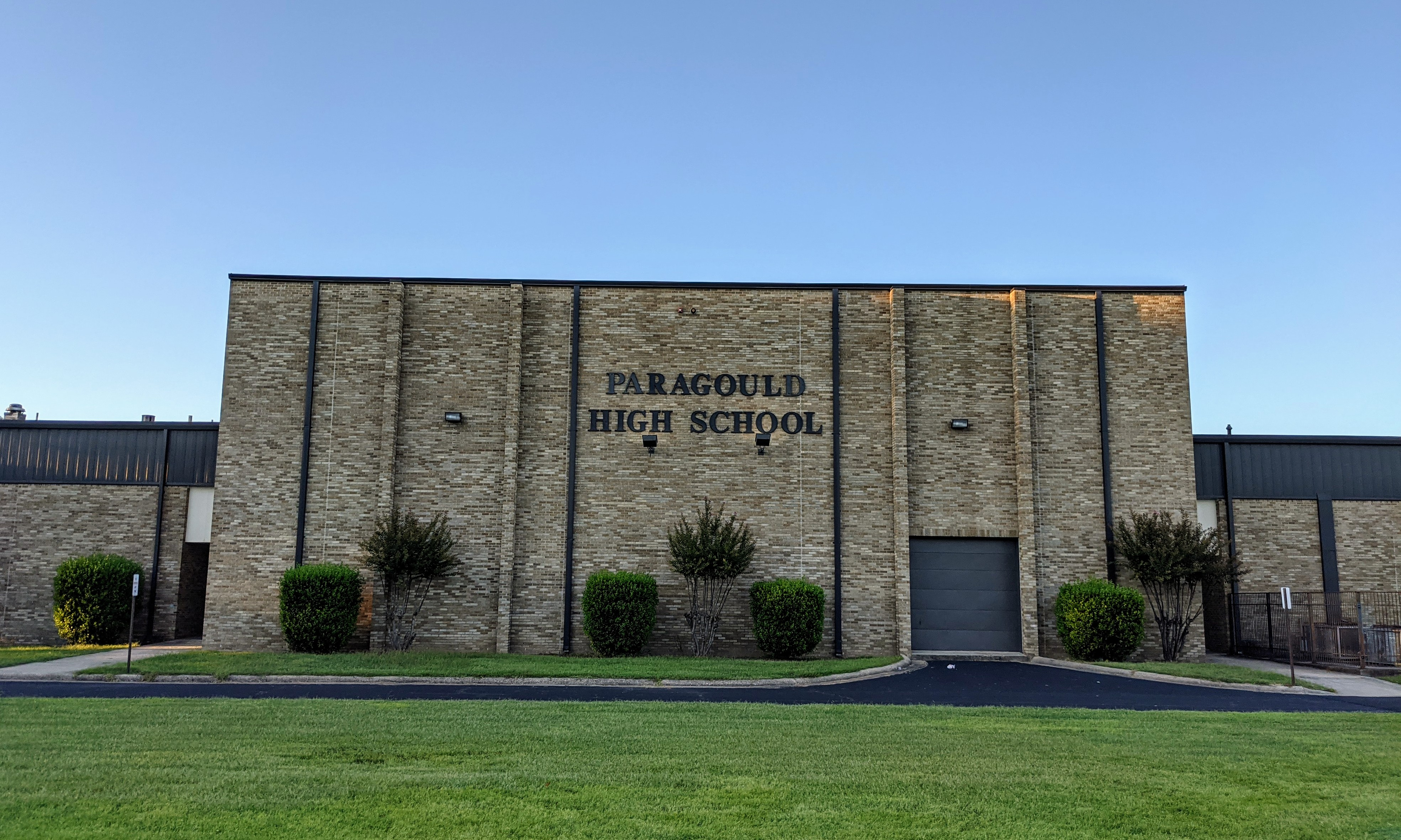

Location
- 1701 West Court Street; Paragould, Arkansas 72450; United States; 36°3′25″N 90°30′31″W

Information
- Status: Open
- School board: Paragould School Board
- School district: Paragould School District
- NCES District ID: 05000170
- Oversight: Arkansas Department of Education (ADE)
- CEEB code: 041960
- NCES School ID: 050001701295
- Teaching staff: 90.71 (FTE)
- Grades: 9–12
- Enrollment: 864 (2023-2024)
- Student to teacher ratio: 9.52
- Education system: ADE Smart Core curriculum
- Classes offered: Regular, Advanced Placement
- Campus type: Rural
- Colors: Red and blue
- Athletics conference: 5A East (2012–14)
- Mascot: Ram
- Team name: Paragould Rams
- Rival: Greene County Tech High School Cross-town rivals
- Accreditation: AdvancED
- Affiliation: Arkansas Activities Association (AAA)
- Website: www.paragould.k12.ar.us/o/phs

Paragould High School is a public school serving grades nine through twelve located in Paragould, Arkansas. The campus is located at 1701 West Court Street in Paragould and is administered by Paragould School District. Oak Grove High School (mascot: Lions) and Paragould High School (mascot: Bulldogs) consolidated into Ridgecrest High School in 1986 and it was voted to change the nickname to the Rams to accommodate this consolidation. After the 1996–1997 school year, the school's name was changed back to Paragould High School but maintained the Rams as mascot.

== Academics ==
The assumed course of study follows the Smart Core curriculum developed by the Arkansas Department of Education (ADE). Students complete regular (core and career focus) courses and exams and may select Advanced Placement (AP) coursework and exams that provide an opportunity for college credit. The school is accredited by the ADE and is a charter member and accredited by AdvancED (formerly North Central Association) since 1925.

== Extracurricular activities ==
Paragould offers many extracurricular activities pertaining to athletics, drama, academic clubs, and band.

The school's mascot is the Ram. The Paragould Rams compete in the Class 5A-East conference of the Arkansas Activities Association. Sports offered at Paragould High School include: football, basketball (boys/girls), soccer, baseball, softball, volleyball, golf, tennis, swimming, and track & field.

=== Football ===
For years now, Paragould High and their cross-town rival, Greene County Tech, have competed with each other in nearly every sport. The most competitive matchup is the yearly Paragould-Tech football games which occur once each school year. The teams used to play two games each season (one as an opener, one as a closer) but, Green County Tech moved up to the AAAAAA conference, and there is no longer a need for a second game. At the end of each season, Paragould and Green County Tech play each other for the coveted Bell Trophy. The winner of the game gets to take the bell home to their school. The Bell Trophy is a three-foot, bronze bell with small engraving plates on either side wood frame that tells the year in which it was won and by which school. The 1948 Paragould Bulldog football won the Class A State Championship beating the Benton Panthers 20-0.

=== Basketball ===
Paragould High has enjoyed success on the hardwood under direction of the legendary Coach Paynter. Paynter coached the Bulldogs/Rams for several decades and made many trips to the state tournament, with several semi-finals and finals appearances. Since the 2004 season, the Rams have not had a winning season and have averaged a meager 2 conference wins per year. Meanwhile, crosstown rival Greene County Tech has enjoyed 2 state titles and 3 finals appearances since 2006. In April 2009, Paragould hired alumnus, former player under Paynter, and most recently, head coach the Greene County Tech Junior High boys' basketball team, Jay Robertson.

The girls' squad is coached by former Arkansas State assistant coach Jay Cook; Cook's first year was the 2008–09 season. In the 2010–11 season, both Coach Cook and Robertson coached their teams to the State tournament. The Sr. Lady Rams were conference champions, and the Sr. High Rams went after Forrest City High School beat out Nettleton High School for the top spot.

=== Band ===
The Paragould Pride Band has quickly grown to become of the district's crowning programs. In the 2014 marching season, the band took home 3 Grand Championships, 1 Reserve Grand Championship, 6 overall and class Drum Major Championships, 6 overall and class percussion Championships, and 1 class color guard Championships, as well as Class A Champions at BOA St. Louis, making the Pride the first Arkansas band to ever win Class A at a BOA event. Since 2008, the band has received 9 Overall Grand Championships and 7 Reserved Grand Championships.

They are 24-time recipients of the ASBOA Sweepstakes award, the highest honor given by ASBOA. Along with this, they are also 8-time back-to back Arkansas State Marching Champions in class 5A as of 2023, the longest record held in ASBOA history. The band is currently under the direction of Carlos Serna, Faith Serna, Matthew Hardin, Trinity Peeler, and Zachary McCullough.
