= Delaplaine School District =

Defunct school district in Arkansas, United States

Location
- Delaplaine, Arkansas United States

District information
- Type: Public
- Closed: July 1, 2004

Other information
- Website: Official website (archive)

Delaplaine School District was a school district headquartered in Delaplaine, Arkansas. It served Delaplaine, O'Kean, and Peach Orchard.

It was administratively divided between an elementary school (Delaplaine Elementary School) and a high school (Delaplaine High School). Until 1962 it had an elementary school in O'Kean.

== History ==
In 1948 the Delaplaine District absorbed the O'Kean district, including the elementary school, and O'Kean High School closed. In 1962 O'Kean Elementary School was shuttered.

At some point the Peach Orchard schools consolidated into the Delaplaine schools.

By 2004 new laws were passed requiring school districts with enrollments below 350 to consolidate with other school districts. Delaplaine was one of several districts that were unable to find another district willing to consolidate with it, so the Arkansas Board of Education was to forcibly consolidate it. On July 1, 2004, it consolidated into the Greene County Tech School District.
