= Crowley's Ridge =

Geological formation in Arkansas and Missouri, U.S.

Coordinates: 36.142°N 90.575°W

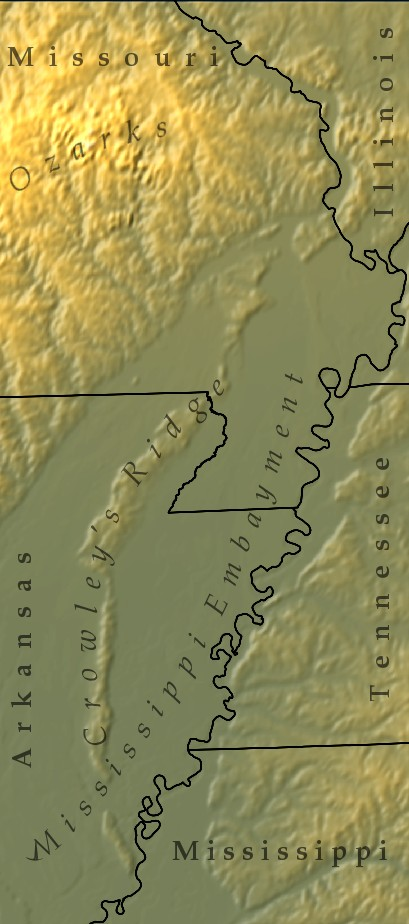
Crowley's Ridge runs through the Mississippi embayment in this shaded-relief map.

Crowley's Ridge (also Crowleys Ridge) is a geological formation that rises 250 to 550 feet (170 m) above the alluvial plain of the Mississippi embayment in a 150-mile (240 km) line from southeastern Missouri to the Mississippi River near Helena, Arkansas. Named for settler Benjamin Crowley, it is the most prominent feature in the Mississippi Alluvial Plain between Cape Girardeau, Missouri, and the Gulf of Mexico.

The narrow rolling hill region rising above the flat plain is the sixth, and smallest, natural division of the state of Arkansas. The southern part is protected within Ozark–St. Francis National Forest.

Most of the major cities of the Arkansas Delta region lie along Crowley's Ridge. It was named after Benjamin Crowley, known as the first American settler to reach the area, sometime around 1820. The Civil War Battle of Chalk Bluff was fought on Crowley's Ridge on May 1–2, 1863.

== Composition and origin ==
The ridge is primarily composed of the windblown glacially derived sediment known as loess. It contrasts greatly with the flat table land around it and with the black soil that makes up the delta. The ridge varies from half a mile to 12 miles (19 km) wide and reaches an elevation of 550 feet (170 m) near its northern extremity. The highest point on the ridge in Arkansas is "Legacy Mountain" at the Craighead County solid waste site south of Jonesboro.

Prevailing winds blow dust into the river fogs. The fog-wetted dust tends to fall and make loess deposits on the downwind sides of rivers, such as the east and north sides of the Mississippi River, as well as the east side of the Black River. These loess deposits are a classic example of periglacial loess. Crowley's Ridge is a natural loess accumulation point. A comparable example of this type of deposit is the Loess Hills in northwestern Missouri and western Iowa.

At one time, the ridge was thought to have been an island between the Mississippi River and Ohio River that was isolated as a long low hilly ridge after the rivers changed course millions of years ago. Recent seismic evidence, however, questions the fluvial origin by focusing on uplift along ridge bounding faults.

There is evidence that the area's elevation has increased over the years, suggesting that uplift is still taking place. This alternative explanation posits a link between the ridge and the nearby New Madrid Seismic Zone.

== Soils and vegetation ==
The flora and fauna of the ridge seem more closely related to the Kentucky and Tennessee hills to the east than to the Ozark Mountains to the west. This unique habitat has been protected by the establishment of several state and city parks, the St. Francis National Forest, recreational lakes, and in 1997 a national scenic byway, the Crowley's Ridge Parkway.

The soils in this area are moderately fertile and sometimes rich. The land is moderately rugged, discouraging row-crop agriculture. These soils are easily eroded. There is some commercial agriculture in the loessal plains area of the ridge. The ridge is surrounded by the fertile lands of the delta region. The vegetation is predominantly oak and hickory forests, similar to vegetation found in the Appalachian Mountains. Examples are the tulip tree (or yellow poplar) and the American beech. Ferns and flowers abound here, including the American bellflower, fire pink, butterfly weed, cardinal flower, blue lobelia, phlox, verbena, wild hydrangea, hibiscus, aster, and yellow jasmine. The low-lying areas around the ridge were once much swampier, and the ridge provided a natural and more healthful place for settlers to establish homes. The ridge became a natural north-south communications link for the region, since travel along the ridge was much easier than through the swampy lowlands.

== Fossils ==
The region adjacent to the ridge is covered with thick deltaic soils, and few fossils are found except in gravel pits. These pits sometimes reveal the teeth of large mastodons, mammoths and horses, which roamed the continent as recently as 10,000 years ago. Crowley's Ridge contains important exposures of fossiliferous Tertiary sediments and contains the only documented Miocene exposures in the state. A silicified conifer stump weighing several tons was unearthed near Wittsburg, and many more were found around Piggott. Mastodon bones were found within the city limits of Helena at the southern end of the ridge. Near Forrest City, in the bed of Crow Creek, a deposit of oyster shells estimated to be nearly 7,000,000 cubic yards in size was discovered.

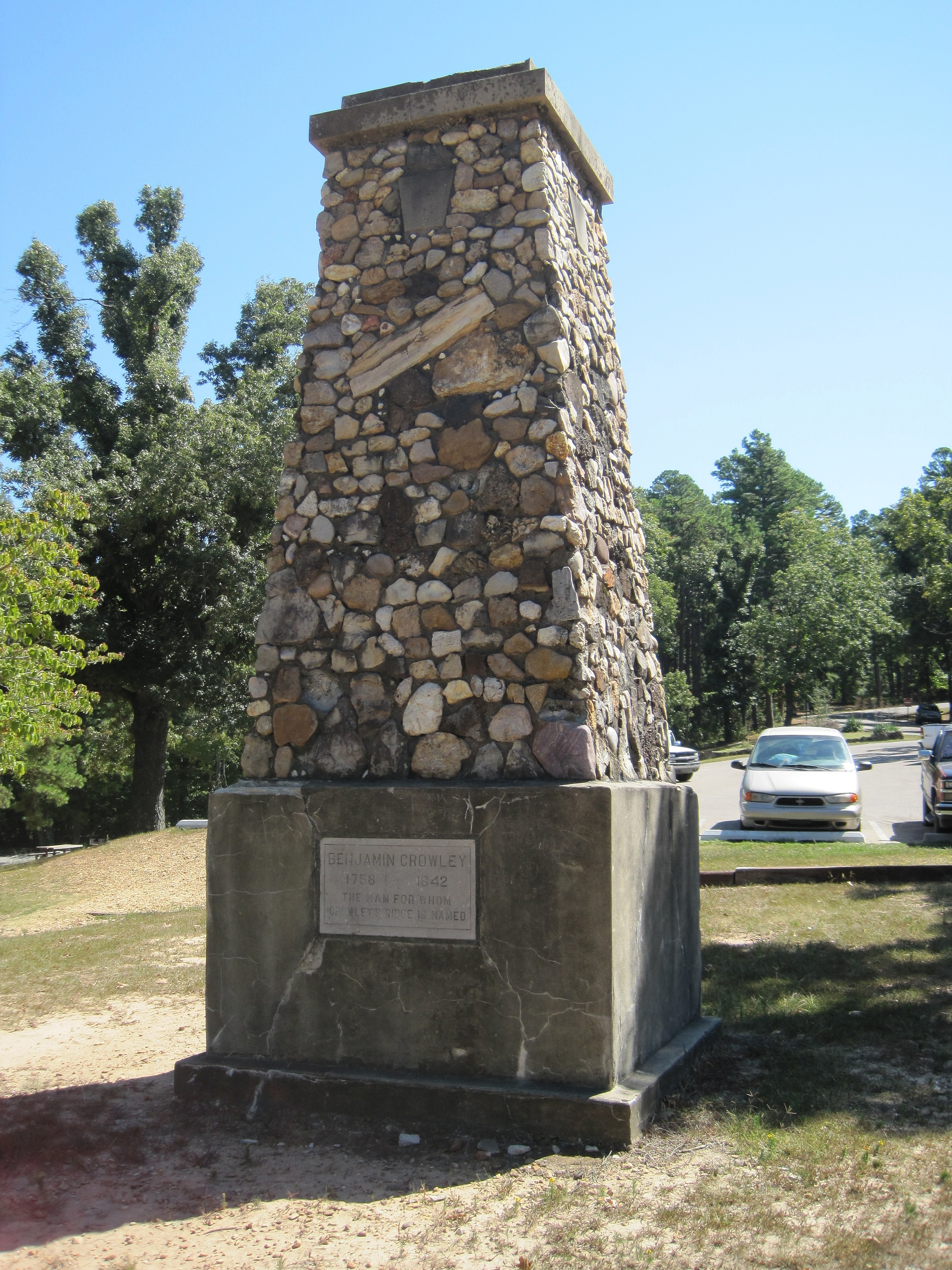
Grave of Benjamin Crowley in Shiloh Cemetery at Crowley's Ridge State Park west of Paragould, Arkansas. The inscription reads "Benjamin Crowley - 1758-1842 - The man for whom Crowley's Ridge is named"
