= Greene County, Arkansas =

County in Arkansas, United States

- County
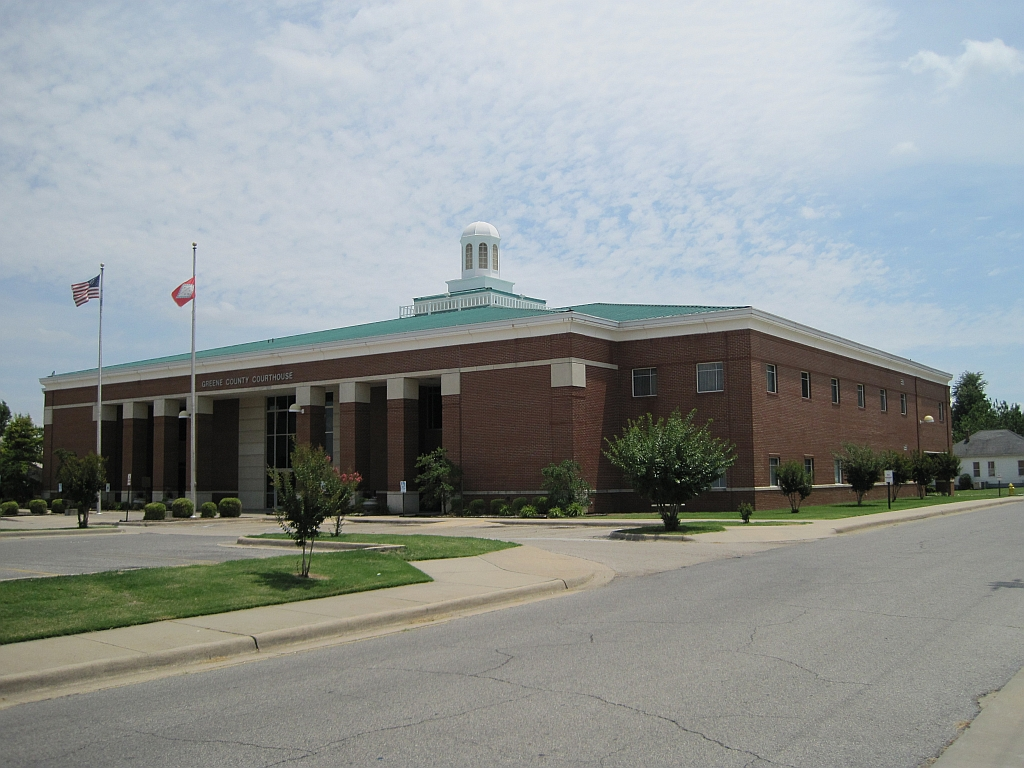
- Courthouse in Paragould

- Location within the U.S. state of Arkansas
- Coordinates: 36°06′21″N 90°33′41″W
- Country: United States
- State: Arkansas
- Founded: November 5, 1833
- Named for: Nathanael Greene
- Seat: Paragould
- Largest city: Paragould

Area
  - Total: 580 sq mi (1,500 km^{2})
  - Land: 578 sq mi (1,500 km^{2})
  - Water: 1.9 sq mi (4.9 km^{2}) 0.3%

Population (2020)
  - Total: 45,736
  - Estimate (2025): 47,411 ▲
  - Density: 79.1/sq mi (30.6/km^{2})
- Time zone: UTC−6 (Central)
  - Summer (DST): UTC−5 (CDT)
- Congressional district: 1st
- Website: county.arkansas.gov/greene/

Greene County is a county located in the U.S. state of Arkansas. As of the 2020 census, the population was 45,736. The county seat is Paragould, which sits atop Crowley's Ridge. Greene County is included in Jonesboro–Paragould Combined Statistical Area.

== History ==
The first settler in the area was Benjamin Crowley, who arrived from Kentucky in 1821 and made his home about 12 miles (19 km) west of Paragould.

Greene County was formed on November 5, 1833, out of portions of Lawrence County and originally contained parts of present Clay and Craighead counties. The county was named for Revolutionary War hero Nathanael Greene. The first county seat was in Benjamin Crowley's home. By 1836, when Arkansas became a state, the county seat was located in a settlement called "Paris" (not to be confused with present-day Paris, Arkansas).

In 1848 a national highway was made through the area, and the county seat was moved to Gainesville, which had a reputation as rather lawless. The seat remained there until 1883, when it was transferred to the new town of Paragould. The people in Gainesville opposed the move, and shots reportedly were fired, since tempers were high. The courthouse was built in 1888 and survives in downtown Paragould.

In the early 20th century, Clay, Greene, and Craighead counties had sundown town policies forbidding African Americans from living in the area.

== Geography ==
According to the U.S. Census Bureau, the county has a total area of 580 square miles (1,500 km^{2}), of which 578 square miles (1,500 km^{2}) is land and 1.9 square miles (4.9 km^{2}) (0.3%) is water.

=== Major highways ===
- U.S. Highway 49
  - U.S. Highway 49 Business
  - U.S. Highway 49Y
- U.S. Highway 63
- U.S. Highway 412
  - U.S. Highway 412 Business
- Highway 1
- Highway 34
- Highway 69
- Highway 90
- Highway 135
- Highway 139
- Highway 141
- Highway 168
- Highway 228
- Highway 280
- Highway 304
- Highway 351
- Highway 358

=== Adjacent counties ===
- Clay County (north)
- Dunklin County, Missouri (east)
- Craighead County (south)
- Lawrence County (southwest)
- Randolph County (northwest)

== Demographics ==
Historical population
Census	Pop.	Note	%±
1840	1,586		—
1850	2,593		63.5%
1860	5,843		125.3%
1870	7,573		29.6%
1880	7,480		−1.2%
1890	12,908		72.6%
1900	16,979		31.5%
1910	23,852		40.5%
1920	26,105		9.4%
1930	26,127		0.1%
1940	30,204		15.6%
1950	29,149		−3.5%
1960	25,198		−13.6%
1970	24,765		−1.7%
1980	30,744		24.1%
1990	31,804		3.4%
2000	37,331		17.4%
2010	42,090		12.7%
2020	45,736		8.7%
2025 (est.)	47,411	▲	3.7%
U.S. Decennial Census; 1790–1960 1900–1990; 1990–2000 2010

=== 2020 census ===
As of the 2020 census, the county had a population of 45,736. The median age was 38.4 years. 24.6% of residents were under the age of 18 and 16.4% of residents were 65 years of age or older. For every 100 females there were 97.1 males, and for every 100 females age 18 and over there were 94.3 males age 18 and over.

The racial makeup of the county was 89.7% White, 2.0% Black or African American, 0.4% American Indian and Alaska Native, 0.4% Asian, 0.6% Native Hawaiian and Pacific Islander, 1.5% from some other race, and 5.3% from two or more races. Hispanic or Latino residents of any race comprised 3.5% of the population.

54.9% of residents lived in urban areas, while 45.1% lived in rural areas.

There were 17,673 households in the county, of which 33.4% had children under the age of 18 living in them. Of all households, 49.7% were married-couple households, 17.6% were households with a male householder and no spouse or partner present, and 25.3% were households with a female householder and no spouse or partner present. About 26.0% of all households were made up of individuals and 11.3% had someone living alone who was 65 years of age or older.

There were 19,159 housing units, of which 7.8% were vacant. Among occupied housing units, 65.6% were owner-occupied and 34.4% were renter-occupied. The homeowner vacancy rate was 2.0% and the rental vacancy rate was 7.4%.

=== 2010 census ===
As of the 2010 census, there were 42,090 people living in the county. The racial makeup of the county was 95.4% White, 0.6% Black, 0.5% Native American, 0.3% Asian, <0.1% Pacific Islander, <0.1% from some other race and 1.1% from two or more races. 2.1% were Hispanic or Latino of any race.

=== 2000 census ===
As of the 2000 census, there were 37,331 people, 14,750 households, and 10,708 families living in the county. The population density was 65 people per square mile (25 people/km^{2}). There were 16,161 housing units at an average density of 28 units per square mile (11 units/km^{2}). The racial makeup of the county was 97.45% White, 0.13% Black or African American, 0.42% Native American, 0.17% Asian, 0.02% Pacific Islander, 0.47% from other races, and 1.34% from two or more races. 1.16% of the population were Hispanic or Latino of any race.

There were 14,750 households, out of which 33.10% had children under the age of 18 living with them, 59.20% were married couples living together, 9.70% had a female householder with no husband present, and 27.40% were non-families. 24.00% of all households were made up of individuals, and 11.00% had someone living alone who was 65 years of age or older. The average household size was 2.49 and the average family size was 2.95.

In the county, the population was spread out, with 25.20% under the age of 18, 9.10% from 18 to 24, 28.70% from 25 to 44, 23.10% from 45 to 64, and 13.90% who were 65 years of age or older. The median age was 36 years. For every 100 females, there were 95.30 males. For every 100 females age 18 and over, there were 91.90 males.

The median income for a household in the county was $30,828, and the median income for a family was $37,316. Males had a median income of $27,535 versus $20,375 for females. The per capita income for the county was $16,403. About 9.90% of families and 13.30% of the population were below the poverty line, including 15.40% of those under age 18 and 12.80% of those age 65 or over.

== Government ==
The county government is a constitutional body granted specific powers by the Constitution of Arkansas and the Arkansas Code. The quorum court is the legislative branch of the county government and controls all spending and revenue collection. Representatives are called justices of the peace and are elected from county districts every even-numbered year. The number of districts in a county vary from nine to fifteen, and district boundaries are drawn by the county election commission. The Greene County Quorum Court has eleven members. Presiding over quorum court meetings is the county judge, who serves as the chief executive officer of the county. The county judge is elected at-large and does not vote in quorum court business, although capable of vetoing quorum court decisions.

Greene County, Arkansas Elected countywide officials
Position	Officeholder	Party
County Judge	Rusty McMillon	Republican
County Clerk	Phyllis Rhynes	Republican
Circuit Clerk	Lesa Gramling	Republican
Sheriff	Brad Snyder	Republican
Treasurer	Kristi Rawls	Republican
Collector	Cindy Tracer	Republican
Assessor	Ashley Reynolds	Republican
Coroner	Martin Buchman	(Unknown)

The composition of the Quorum Court after the 2024 elections is 11 Republicans. Justices of the Peace (members) of the Quorum Court following the elections are:

- District 1: Sherma Clark Dicus (R)
- District 2: Robert Glasco (R)
- District 3: Bill McCartney (R)
- District 4: Jonathan Davis (R)
- District 5: Michele Boling (R)
- District 6: Phillip Keeling (R)
- District 7: Allen Davis (R)
- District 8: Dean Wooldridge (R)
- District 9: Marc Reeves (R)
- District 10: Ronnie Roberts (R)
- District 11: Kirk Brinkley (R)

Additionally, the townships of Greene County are entitled to elect their own respective constables, as set forth by the Constitution of Arkansas. Constables are largely of historical significance as they were used to keep the peace in rural areas when travel was more difficult. The township constables as of the 2024 elections are:

- Bula: Kevin Gillmore (R)
- Campground: Billy Joe Foster (R)
- Crowley's Ridge: Patrick Lenderman (R)
- Dalton: David Howell (R)
- Rush Island: Jeremy Perry (D)

Over the past few election cycles, Greene County has swung hard towards the GOP. The last Democrat to carry this county was Al Gore in 2000. Twenty years later, Joe Biden failed to even garner twenty percent of the county's vote.

United States presidential election results for Greene County, Arkansas
Year	Republican		Democratic		Third party(ies)	
Year	No.	%	No.	%	No.	%
1896	262	13.79%	1,627	85.63%	11	0.58%
1900	419	27.44%	1,091	71.45%	17	1.11%
1904	409	29.45%	922	66.38%	58	4.18%
1908	549	24.48%	1,606	71.60%	88	3.92%
1912	286	14.05%	1,251	61.47%	498	24.47%
1916	533	18.87%	2,292	81.13%	0	0.00%
1920	1,072	35.53%	1,865	61.82%	80	2.65%
1924	456	23.57%	1,148	59.33%	331	17.11%
1928	1,011	41.27%	1,426	58.20%	13	0.53%
1932	274	7.65%	3,277	91.43%	33	0.92%
1936	412	18.48%	1,811	81.25%	6	0.27%
1940	510	18.65%	2,220	81.17%	5	0.18%
1944	928	26.51%	2,565	73.26%	8	0.23%
1948	502	14.81%	2,657	78.38%	231	6.81%
1952	1,875	34.35%	3,571	65.43%	12	0.22%
1956	1,898	35.22%	3,454	64.09%	37	0.69%
1960	2,658	47.73%	2,774	49.81%	137	2.46%
1964	2,271	32.27%	4,742	67.39%	24	0.34%
1968	2,859	35.40%	2,197	27.20%	3,021	37.40%
1972	6,128	73.03%	2,263	26.97%	0	0.00%
1976	2,690	26.39%	7,495	73.54%	7	0.07%
1980	4,514	41.64%	5,996	55.31%	331	3.05%
1984	6,179	56.17%	4,730	43.00%	91	0.83%
1988	5,161	50.06%	5,065	49.13%	84	0.81%
1992	3,510	28.49%	7,541	61.20%	1,271	10.31%
1996	3,757	32.68%	6,622	57.61%	1,116	9.71%
2000	5,831	46.71%	6,319	50.62%	334	2.68%
2004	7,237	51.86%	6,564	47.04%	154	1.10%
2008	8,578	63.02%	4,541	33.36%	493	3.62%
2012	9,071	65.92%	4,000	29.07%	690	5.01%
2016	10,720	73.42%	3,071	21.03%	809	5.54%
2020	12,670	78.70%	3,058	18.99%	372	2.31%
2024	12,617	79.75%	2,935	18.55%	268	1.69%

== Communities ==
=== Cities ===
- Marmaduke
- Paragould (county seat)

=== Towns ===
- Delaplaine
- Lafe
- Oak Grove Heights

=== Census-designated place ===
- Walcott

=== Unincorporated communities ===
- Beech Grove
- Cotton Belt
- Fontaine
- Gainesville
- Hopewell
- Light
- Walnut Corner

== Townships ==
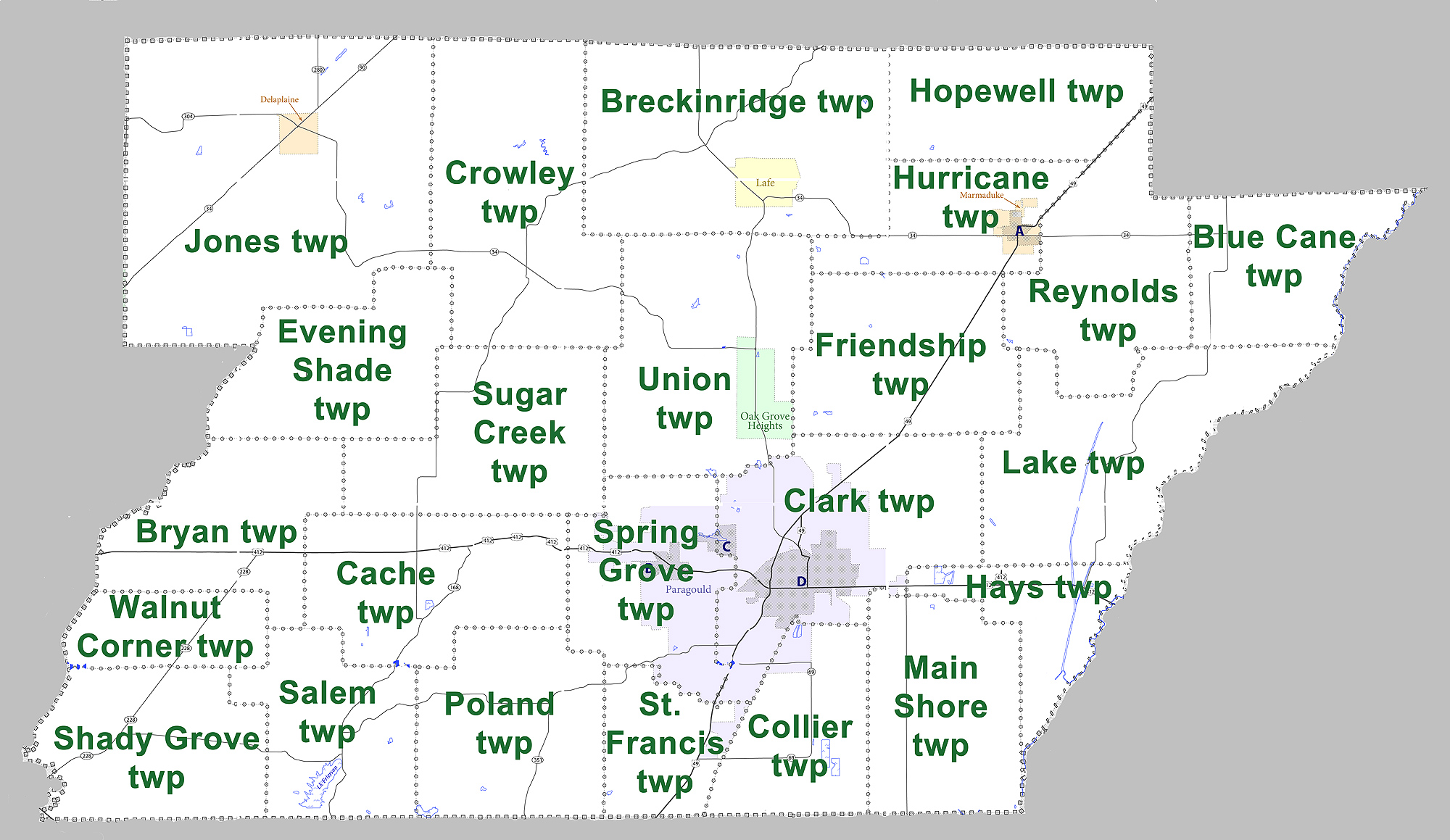
Townships in Greene County, Arkansas as of 2010

Townships in Arkansas are the divisions of a county. Each township includes unincorporated areas; some may have incorporated cities or towns within part of their boundaries. Arkansas townships have limited purposes in modern times. However, the United States census does list Arkansas population based on townships (sometimes referred to as "county subdivisions" or "minor civil divisions"). Townships are also of value for historical purposes in terms of genealogical research. Each town or city is within one or more townships in an Arkansas county based on census maps and publications. The townships of Greene County are listed below; listed in parentheses are the cities, towns, and/or census-designated places that are fully or partially inside the township.

- Blue Cane
- Breckenridge (Lafe)
- Bryan
- Cache
- Clark (most of Paragould)
- Collier
- Crowley
- Evening Shade
- Friendship
- Hays
- Hopewell
- Hurricane (Marmaduke)
- Jones (Delaplaine)
- Lake
- Main Shore
- Poland
- Reynolds
- St. Francis (small part of Paragould)
- Salem
- Shady Grove
- Spring Grove (part of Paragould)
- Sugar Creek
- Union (Oak Grove Heights)
- Walnut Corner

== Education ==
School districts include:

- Greene County Technical School District
- Marmaduke School District
- Paragould School District
  - It consists of the boundary of the original Paragould School District, plus the Oak Grove School district, which merged with the former Paragould district on July 1, 1985, and the Stanford School District. The new merged district was originally called the Northeast Arkansas School District; by 1997 the name of the new district became the Paragould School District.

Former districts:

- Delaplaine School District - Consolidated into Greene County Technical in 2004.

== See also ==
- Lake Frierson State Park
- List of lakes in Greene County, Arkansas
- List of sundown towns in the United States
- National Register of Historic Places listings in Greene County, Arkansas
