= Walcott, Arkansas =

- Census-designated place
- Location within Arkansas Location within the United States
- Coordinates: 36°02′43″N 90°40′20″W
- Country: United States
- State: Arkansas
- County: Greene
- Elevation: 318 ft (97 m)

Population (2020)
  - Total: 152
- Time zone: UTC-6 (Central (CST))
  - Summer (DST): UTC-5 (CDT)
- ZIP code: 72474
- Area code: 870
- GNIS feature ID: 2805693

Walcott is an unincorporated community and census-designated place (CDP) in Greene County, Arkansas, United States. Walcott is located at the junction of Arkansas highways 141 and 168, 10 miles (16 km) west of Paragould. It was first listed as a CDP in the 2020 census with a population of 152.

Walcott has a post office with ZIP code 72474.

== Demographics ==
Historical population
| Census | Pop. | Note | %± |
|---|---|---|---|
| 2020 | 152 | | — |
U.S. Decennial Census; 2020

=== 2020 census ===
Walcott CDP, Arkansas – Demographic Profile (NH = Non-Hispanic) Note: the US Census treats Hispanic/Latino as an ethnic category. This table excludes Latinos from the racial categories and assigns them to a separate category. Hispanics/Latinos may be of any race.
| Race / Ethnicity | Pop 2020 | % 2020 |
|---|---|---|
| White alone (NH) | 138 | 90.79% |
| Black or African American alone (NH) | 0 | 0.00% |
| Native American or Alaska Native alone (NH) | 0 | 0.00% |
| Asian alone (NH) | 0 | 0.00% |
| Pacific Islander alone (NH) | 0 | 0.00% |
| Some Other Race alone (NH) | 1 | 0.66% |
| Mixed Race/Multi-Racial (NH) | 9 | 5.92% |
| Hispanic or Latino (any race) | 4 | 2.63% |
| Total | 152 | 100.00% |

== Education ==
Its school district is the Greene County Tech School District. Greene County Tech High School is the district's high school.
