= Arkansas Highway 231 =

State highway in Arkansas, United States

Highway 231
- AR 231 highlighted in red

Route information
- Maintained by ArDOT

Section 1
- Length: 5.79 mi (9.32 km)
- South end: US 412
- North end: AR 34

Section 2
- Length: 3.02 mi (4.86 km)
- South end: AR 90 near O'Kean
- North end: AR 304 at Sharum

Section 3
- Length: 6.12 mi (9.85 km)
- South end: AR 251
- North end: AR 93

Location
- Country: United States
- State: Arkansas
- Counties: Lawrence, Randolph

Highway system
- Arkansas Highway System; Interstate; US; State; Business; Spurs; Suffixed; Scenic; Heritage
← AR 230	→ AR 232

Highway 231 (AR 231, Ark. 231, and Hwy. 231) is a designation for three north–south state highways in northeast Arkansas. All three segments serve rural, agricultural areas in the Arkansas Delta. One segment of 5.79 miles (9.32 km) runs north from U.S. Route 412 (US 412) to Highway 34. A second route of 3.02 miles (4.86 km) begins at Highway 90 near O'Kean and runs north to Highway 304 at Sharum. A third segment of 6.12 miles (9.85 km) begins at Highway 251 and runs to Highway 93. All routes are maintained by the Arkansas State Highway and Transportation Department (AHTD).

== Route description ==
=== Lawrence County ===
The highway begins at U.S. Route 412 (US 412) east of Walnut Ridge near the Cache River and the Green County line. Highway 231 runs north through an agricultural area before turning northwest and intersecting the Union Pacific Railroad line, which parallels Highway 34 through the region. Shortly after this at-grade crossing, Highway 231 terminates at Highway 34.

=== O'Kean to Sharum ===
Highway 231 begins in the southeast corner of Randolph County near the city of O'Kean at an intersection with Highway 90. The minor connector route runs due north along a section line to Highway 304, where it terminates near the unincorporated community of Sharum. The highway serves an agricultural area near the Black River.

=== Randolph County ===
Highway 231 begins at Highway 251 several miles northwest of Pocahontas near the Missouri state line. Odd-numbered Arkansas state highways are traditionally north–south routes, and as a result, are usually signed north–south even if the actual roadway alignment is east–west. This segment of Highway 231 runs west, passing through the unincorporated community of Hamil, to Highway 93, where it terminates.

== Major intersections ==
County	Location	mi	km	Destinations	Notes
Lawrence		0.00	0.00	US 412 – Walnut Ridge, Paragould	Southern terminus
Lawrence		5.79	9.32	AR 34 – Walnut Ridge, O'Kean	Northern terminus
Highway 231 begins near O'Kean
Randolph		0.00	0.00	AR 90 – Delaplaine	Southern terminus
Randolph	Sharum	3.02	4.86	AR 304 – Pocahontas, Delaplaine	Northern terminus
Randolph	Highway 231 begins in northern Randolph County				
Randolph		0.00	0.00	AR 251	Southern terminus
Randolph		6.12	9.85	AR 93	Northern terminus
1.000 mi = 1.609 km; 1.000 km = 0.621 mi: Concurrency terminus

== History ==
The segment between O'Kean and Sharum was adopted as a state highway by the Arkansas State Highway Commission on March 28, 1973. A section between Warm Springs and Middlebrook was also created at the same meeting. A section near College City between US 67 and the Walnut Ridge Industrial Park was added as a state highway on April 9, 1980. The section between Warm Springs and Middlebrook was swapped for the section between Highway 251 and Highway 93 at the request of the Randolph County Judge on November 6, 1980.

=== Former routes ===
==== Middlebrook to Warm Springs ====
Highway 231
- Location: Middlebrook to Warm Springs
- Length: 7.5 mi (12.1 km)
- Existed: March 28, 1973–November 6, 1980

Highway 231 (AR 231, Ark. 231, and Hwy. 231) is a former state highway in Randolph County, Arkansas. Created in 1973 and deleted in 1980, the route was approximately 7.5 miles (12.1 km) in length. The highway ran from Highway 115 near Middlebrook west to Highway 251 at Warm Springs.

==== College City ====
Highway 231
- Location: College City
- Length: 1.02 mi (1.64 km)
- Existed: yes

Highway 231 (AR 231, Ark. 231, and Hwy. 231) is a former state highway in Lawrence County, Arkansas. Created in 1980, the route was approximately 1.02 miles (1.64 km) in length. The highway ran from US 67 near College City to the Walnut Ridge Industrial Park.
