= KPOC =

KPOC may refer to:

- The ICAO code for Brackett Field
- KPOC (AM), a radio station (1420 AM) licensed to Pocahontas, Arkansas, United States
- KPOC-FM, a radio station (104.1 FM) licensed to Pocahontas, Arkansas, United States
