= Arkansas Highway 93 =

State highway in Arkansas, United States

Highway 93

Route information
- Maintained by AHTD
- Length: 14.66 mi (23.59 km)
- Existed: 1926–present

Major junctions
- South end: AR 90 near Elevenpoint
- North end: Route BB at the Missouri state line near Myrtle, MO

Location
- Country: United States
- State: Arkansas
- Counties: Randolph

Highway system
- Arkansas Highway System; Interstate; US; State; Business; Spurs; Suffixed; Scenic; Heritage
← AR 92	→ AR 94

Arkansas Highway 93 (AR 93 and Hwy. 93) is a north–south state highway in Randolph County, Arkansas. The route of 14.66 miles (23.59 km) runs from AR 90 north to the Missouri state line.

== Route description ==
AR 93 begins at AR 90 northwest of Pocahontas. The route winds north through forested land before a junction with Arkansas Highway 231, which connects AR 93 and AR 251 in north Randolph County. Highway 93 continues north through the communities of Dalton and Elm Store before meeting the Missouri state line. The road enters Missouri as Supplemental route BB, also entering the Mark Twain National Forest. The route it two–lane, undivided for its entire length.

== History ==

Arkansas Highway 93 was one of the original 1926 Arkansas state highways. The route ran north in Randolph County along its present-day alignment, without the Highway 231 junction (the highway was not yet designated). Highway 93's southern terminus was US 62, which was later rerouted south and now runs through Pocahontas, with the former alignment becoming Highway 90.

== Major intersections ==
The entire route is in Randolph County.

Location	mi	km	Destinations	Notes
Eleven Point Township	0.0	0.0	AR 90 – Pocahontas, Ravenden	
Jackson Township	3.24	5.21	AR 231 east	
Dalton Township	14.66	23.59	Route BB	Continuation beyond Missouri state line
1.000 mi = 1.609 km; 1.000 km = 0.621 mi

== See also ==
- List of state highways in Arkansas
