= U.S. Route 67 in Arkansas =

Section of U.S. Highway in Arkansas, United States

U.S. Highway 67
- US 67 highlighted in red

Route information
- Maintained by ArDOT
- Length: 279.15 mi (449.25 km)

Major junctions
- South end: US 67 / US 82 at the Texas state line in Texarkana
- I-30 near Texarkana; I-30 / US 70 / AR 229 in Benton; I-430 / US 70 in Little Rock; I-440 / I-530 / US 65 / US 167 in Little Rock; I-630 in Little Rock; I-40 / US 65 / AR 107 in North Little Rock; I-440 in Jacksonville; US 412 / US 412B in Walnut Ridge
- North end: US 67 at the Missouri state line near Corning

Location
- Country: United States
- State: Arkansas
- Counties: Miller, Hempstead, Nevada, Clark, Hot Spring, Saline, Pulaski, Lonoke, White, Jackson, Craighead, Lawrence, Randolph, Clay

Highway system
- United States Numbered Highway System; List; Special; Divided; Arkansas Highway System; Interstate; US; State; Business; Spurs; Suffixed; Scenic; Heritage
← AR 66	→ AR 69

U.S. Route 67 (US 67) is a U.S. route running from Presidio, Texas northeast to Sabula, Iowa. In the U.S. state of Arkansas, the route runs 279.15 miles (449.25 km) from the Texas border in Texarkana northeast to the Missouri border near Corning. The route passes through several cities and towns, including Hope, Benton, Little Rock, Jacksonville, Cabot, Beebe, Walnut Ridge, and Pocahontas.

== Route description ==
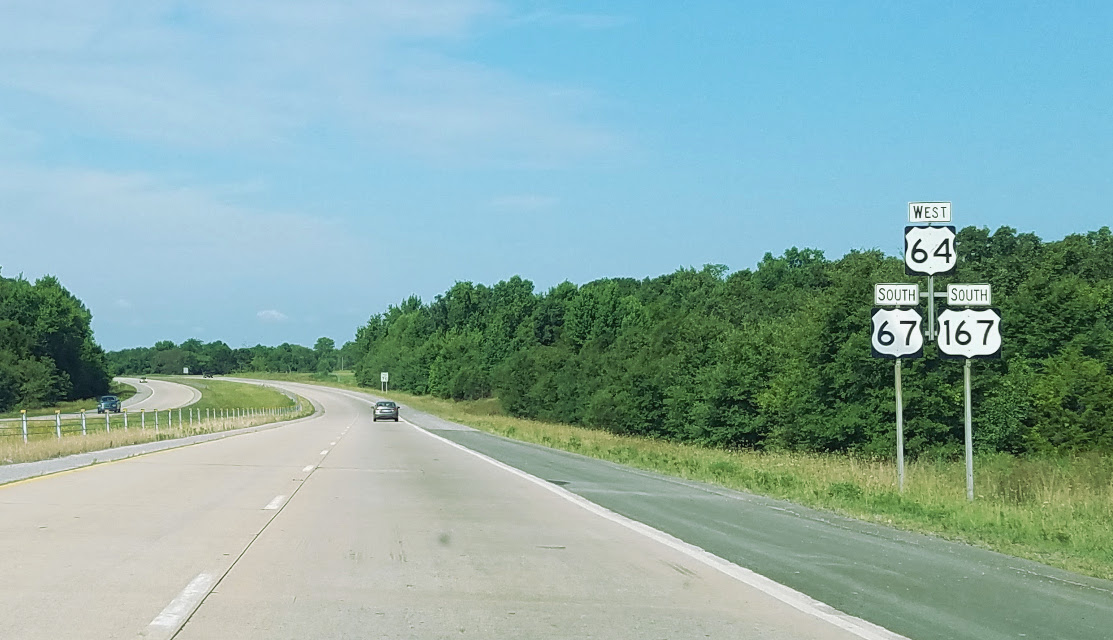
US 67 is concurrent with I-57 as well as US 64 and US 167 between Beebe and Bald Knob.

US 67 enters Arkansas from Texas in Texarkana, concurrent with US 82, along the one-way 7th Street; the other half of the one-way couplet, Dr. Martin Luther King Jr. Boulevard, carries traffic toward Texarkana, Texas. Upon crossing State Line Avenue, the two routes share a brief concurrency with US 71 before that route turns to the south along Hickory Street. Past this intersection, the one-way couplet merges onto 9th Street. Shortly thereafter, US 67 separates from US 82 and travels to the northeast along Broad Street, crossing Interstate 49 (I-49) and passing Texarkana Regional Airport.

US 67 then runs parallel to I-30, passing through cities such as Hope, Prescott, Arkadelphia, and Malvern. Near Benton, US 67 merges with I-30. The two routes run concurrently to Little Rock, where the freeway also picks up US 65 and US 167. In North Little Rock, US 67 and US 167 turn to the east, concurrent with I-40 for about 2 miles (3.2 km), before branching off to the northeast with I-57.

In Beebe, the three routes begin a concurrency with US 64. The four routes part ways in Bald Knob, with I-57/US 67 continuing as a freeway to the northeast. Just north of US 412 in Walnut Ridge, I-57 ends at a large, partially-complete interchange, and US 67 becomes a five-lane undivided highway north to Pocahontas. From Pocahontas, the road turns northeasterly and then easterly as the original two-lane highway concurrent with US 62. In Corning, US 62 continues to the east while US 67 turns northward again before crossing the Missouri state line.

== History ==
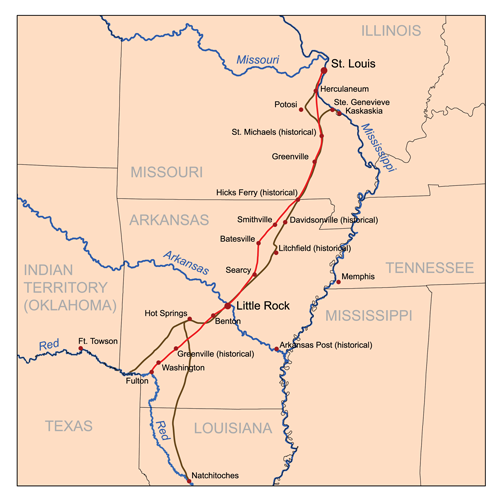
Original trace of the Southwest Trail, precursor to U.S. Route 67 in the area.

The southwest-northeast bisector of Arkansas has always been an integral motor route. Prior to designation as US 67, the route was known as the Southwest Trail, an old military road around 1803. The Southwest Trail connected St. Louis, Missouri with Texas by steamboat in Fulton, Arkansas. The main railroad was built along the Southwest Trail, which developed many towns along the route. President Andrew Jackson appropriated money for the route in 1831, and designated it as a National Road. Although the route shifted slightly, it always has followed the natural break between the Ozark Mountains and the Ouachita Mountains and the Mississippi Alluvial Plain.

Money for road maintenance was raised individually by county in the early 20th century, which hindered development of the route. In the 1920s, federal money became available, and the route was designated U.S. Route 67. The routing followed the Lakes to Gulf Highway and the Bankhead Highway. Federal designation brought paving to the route, which grew the small towns along the route.

In early 2009, the Arkansas legislature passed a bill naming the portion of US-67 from the Missouri state line to Jackson County "Rock n' Roll U.S. 67" as a tribute to the route that many musicians of the 1950s and 1960s took as they traveled. Governor Mike Beebe stated that he had hopes that the naming would bring tourism to northeast Arkansas. Portions of the route, and also Arkansas Highway 7 between Hope and Hot Springs frequently used by Bill Clinton is designated The Highway of Hope by Arkansas Code § 27-67-220.

=== National Register of Historic Places ===
Several portions of the original late 1920s alignment of US 67 have survived, some of which are listed on the National Register of Historic Places. One listed segment is in Lawrence County, which is about 11.25 miles (18.11 km) in length, and runs north from Alicia to Hoxie, most of this being sandwiched between the present Arkansas Highway 367 and US 67, and the adjacent railroad tracks. Near the village of Village Creek Relief it briefly turns west, crossing Village Creek, and then rejoining the railroad tracks near the town of Relief. A second listed segment, also about 11 miles (18 km) in length, extends from Biggers in central eastern Randolph County, northeast to Datto in Clay County, and then straight north to a junction with Arkansas Highway 211.

==== Mandeville ====
- Old US 67, Mandeville
- U.S. National Register of Historic Places
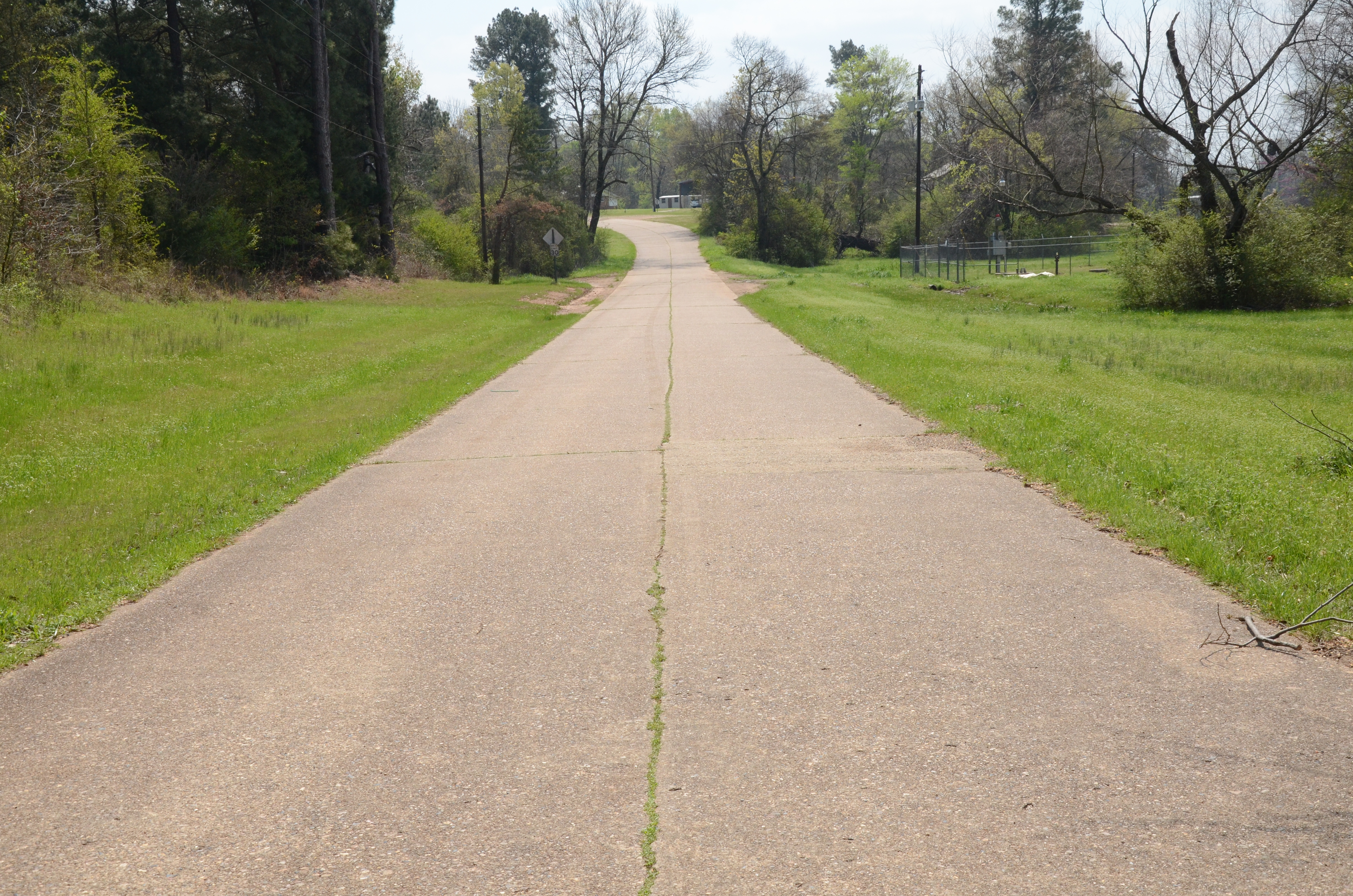
- Location: AR 296, CR 138, and southeast of the current U.S. Route 67
- Coordinates: 33°29′16″N 93°57′35″W
- NRHP reference No.: 03001458
- Added to NRHP: January 21, 2004

Listed on the NRHP as Old US 67, Mandeville, a historic roadway section of US 67 is preserved in Miller County, Arkansas. It travels parallel to railroad tracks of the Union Pacific Railroad for 5.5 miles (8.9 km) from an intersection with Highway 237, just north of the Texarkana Airport, northeast to Miller County Road 63. The southern portion of this road is called Mandeville Road, and is designated Arkansas Highway 296. It is eventually redesignated Miller County Road 138, and is an unnamed side road of the current alignment of U.S. Route 67 (US 67) in its northernmost stretch. Built in 1929 out of concrete, it is the longest stretch of original pavement on the Old US 67 alignment in Miller County.

The roadway was listed on the National Register of Historic Places in 2004.

== Future ==
Arkansas is upgrading US 67 to Interstate standards from Little Rock to the Missouri state line, and the corridor is slated to become an extension of Interstate 57. The freeway currently runs from Little Rock to Walnut Ridge. New freeway is in active planning from Walnut Ridge to Missouri, on a path generally southeast of the current US-67 highway, except where it will pass northwest of Corning ArDOT has announced that construction will begin in 2024 for the short segment that will bypass Corning, and tentatively in 2026 for the segment from the northern Corning interchange to the Missouri state line. It is unknown when the remaining segments between Walnut Ridge and Corning will be funded and built.

On November 7, 2024, the section of U.S. 67 between North Little Rock and Walnut Ridge previously updated to interstate standards was officially designated as Interstate 57 by the Arkansas Department of Transportation.

== Major intersections ==
County	Location	mi	km	Exit	Destinations	Notes
Miller	Texarkana	0.0	0.0		US 67 south / US 82 west (Dr. Martin Luther King Jr. Boulevard)	Continuation into Texas
Miller	Texarkana	0.0	0.0		US 71 north (State Line Avenue)	Southern end of US 71 concurrency northbound; Texas state line
Miller	Texarkana	0.1	0.16		US 71 north (Hazel Street) – Texarkana Business District	Southern end of US 71 concurrency southbound
Miller	Texarkana	0.5	0.80		US 71 south (Hickory Street)	Northern end of US 71 concurrency
Miller	Texarkana	1.0	1.6		US 82 east (East 9th Street)	Northern end of US 82 concurrency
Miller	Texarkana				AR 245 (now part of I-49)	Closed interchange
Miller	Texarkana	3.6	5.8		Arkansas Boulevard / Airport Drive – Airport	
Miller	Texarkana	4.3	6.9		AR 237 south / AR 296 east – Mandeville	Northern terminus of AR 237; western terminus of AR 296
Miller	Mandeville	6.4	10.3		AR 296 west to I-30 / US 71	Eastern terminus of AR 296
Miller		8.2	13.2		AR 108 west to I-30	Eastern terminus of AR 108
Miller		13.2	21.2		I-30 west – Texarkana	Exit 12 on I-30
Red River				Bridge		
Hempstead	Fulton	18.9	30.4		AR 355 north – Fulton, Millwood Dam	Southern terminus of AR 355
Hempstead		19.5	31.4		I-30 – Little Rock, Texarkana	Access via CR 1; exit 18 on I-30
Hempstead	Guernsey	27.0	43.5		AR 353 north – Guernsey	Southern terminus of AR 353
Hempstead	Hope	31.7	51.0		AR 174 east (Fulton Street)	Western terminus of AR 174
Hempstead	Hope	32.0	51.5		US 278B west (Hervey Street) to I-30	Southern end of US 278B concurrency
Hempstead	Hope	32.3	52.0		AR 29B south (Main Street)	Southern end of AR 29B concurrency
Hempstead	Hope	32.4	52.1		AR 29B north (Hazel Street)	Northern end of AR 29B concurrency
Hempstead	Hope	33.2	53.4		US 278 / AR 29 (Bill Clinton Drive) to I-30 US 278B ends	Eastern terminus of US 278B
Hempstead	Hope	33.5	53.9		AR 73 south	Northern terminus of AR 73
Hempstead		35.3	56.8		AR 174 west	Eastern terminus of AR 174
Nevada	Emmet	40.5	65.2		AR 299 north to I-30	Southern end of AR 299 concurrency
Nevada	Emmet	40.7	65.5		AR 299 south to AR 53	Northern end of AR 299 concurrency
Nevada	Prescott	47.7	76.8		AR 332 west (Washington Road) – De Ann	Eastern terminus of AR 332
Nevada	Prescott	48.0	77.2		US 371 south – Magnolia	Southern end of US 371 concurrency
Nevada	Prescott	48.4	77.9		US 371 north / AR 24 east to I-30 – Nashville, Bluff City	Northern end of US 371 concurrency; western terminus of AR 24
Clark		58.9	94.8		AR 51 north to I-30 – Okolona	Southern end of AR 51 concurrency
Clark		61.4	98.8		AR 51 south – Beirne	Northern end of AR 51 concurrency
Clark	Gurdon	64.8	104.3		AR 53 south – Whelen Springs, White Oak Lake State Park	Southern end of AR 53 concurrency
Clark	Gurdon	65.2	104.9		AR 182 west – Okolona	Eastern terminus of AR 182
Clark		65.7	105.7		AR 53 north to I-30 / AR 51	Northern end of AR 53 concurrency
Clark		74.4	119.7		AR 26S north – Clark County Industrial Park	Southern terminus of AR 26S
Clark	Gum Springs	75.1	120.9		AR 26 (Reynolds Road) to I-30	
Clark	Arkadelphia	80.3	129.2		AR 7 south / AR 8 east / AR 51 north (Caddo Street)	Southern end of AR 7/AR 8/AR 51 concurrency
Clark	Arkadelphia	80.6	129.7		AR 8 west / AR 51 south (Pine Street) to I-30 – Antoine, Amity	Northern end of AR 8/AR 51 concurrency
Clark	Caddo Valley	85.7	137.9		I-30 / AR 7 north – Hot Springs, DeGray Dam	Northern end of AR 7 concurrency; exit 78 on I-30
Hot Spring	Friendship	89.9	144.7		AR 283 north to I-30	Southern terminus of AR 283
Hot Spring	Donaldson	94.6	152.2		AR 51Y south to AR 51 south / AR 222 – Donaldson Business District	Northern terminus of AR 51Y
Hot Spring		95.2	153.2		AR 51 south to AR 222 – Donaldson Business District	Northern terminus of AR 51
Hot Spring	Malvern	106.0	170.6		US 270B west / AR 9 south (South Main Street) to I-30	Southern end of US 270B concurrency
Hot Spring		108.7	174.9		US 270 to I-30 – Hot Springs, Sheridan US 270B ends	Northern terminus of US 270B
Hot Spring		110.7	178.2		AR 171 south	Northern terminus of AR 171
Saline		117.7	189.4		I-30 – Texarkana, Little Rock	Exit 106 on I-30
Saline	Haskell	123.2	198.3		AR 229 south – Haskell, Traskwood	Southern end of AR 229 concurrency
Saline		124.7	200.7	Southern end of freeway section		
Saline		124.7	200.7	114	I-30 west (US 70 west) / AR 229 north – Texarkana	Northern end of AR 229 concurrency; southern end of I-30/US 70 concurrency
Saline	Benton			116	Sevier Street / South Street (AR 229 south)	
Saline	Benton			117	AR 5 / AR 35 south – Benton	Northern terminus of AR 35
Saline	Benton			118	AR 5 / Congo Road	AR 5 not signed
Saline	Benton–Bryant line			121	Alcoa Road	
Saline	Bryant			123	AR 183 – Bryant, Bauxite	
Saline	Bryant			124	Bryant Parkway	
Saline–Pulaski county line	Alexander–Little Rock line			126	AR 111 south (Alexander Road) – Alexander	Northern terminus of AR 111
Pulaski	Little Rock			128	Mabelvale West Road / Otter Creek Road / Bass Pro Parkway	
Pulaski	Little Rock			129	I-430 north (US 70 east) – Fort Smith	Southern terminus of I-430; eastern end of US 70 concurrency
Pulaski	Little Rock			130	AR 338 (Baseline Road) – Mabelvale	
Pulaski	Little Rock			131	McDaniel Drive	Westbound exit only
Pulaski	Little Rock			131	Chicot Road	Eastbound exit only
Pulaski	Little Rock				University Avenue	Former US 70
Pulaski	Little Rock				Geyer Springs Road	
Pulaski	Little Rock			134	Scott Hamilton Drive / Stanton Road	No eastbound access to Stanton Road
Pulaski	Little Rock				65th Street	
Pulaski	Little Rock			138	I-440 east / I-530 south / US 65 south / US 167 south – Memphis, St. Louis, Airport, Pine Bluff	Western end of US 65/US 167 concurrency; signed as exits 138A (east) and 138B (south) eastbound; exit 1B on I-530
Pulaski	Little Rock			139A	AR 365 (Roosevelt Road)	Former routing of US 65
Pulaski	Little Rock			139B	I-630 west	Eastern terminus of I-630
Pulaski	Little Rock			140	Downtown Little Rock	Eastbound exit and westbound entrance
Pulaski	Little Rock			140	Downtown Little Rock	Westbound exit and eastbound entrance; access via AR 10
Pulaski	Arkansas River			Freeway Bridge		
Pulaski	North Little Rock			141	US 70 (Broadway Street)	
Pulaski	North Little Rock			142	Curtis Sykes Drive	No eastbound entrance
Pulaski	North Little Rock			143A (NB); 153 (SB)	I-40 west / US 65 north / AR 107 north (JFK Boulevard) – Conway, Fort Smith I-30 ends	Signed as exits 153A (AR 107) and 153B (I-40) southbound; northern end of US 65 concurrency; southern end of I-40 concurrency; eastern terminus of I-30
Pulaski	North Little Rock			154	North Hills Boulevard	Northbound exit and southbound entrance
Pulaski	North Little Rock			155	I-40 east – Memphis I-57 begins	Northern end of I-40 concurrency; southern terminus of I-57
Pulaski	North Little Rock			1	McCain Boulevard	Signed as exits 1A (east) and 1B (west) northbound
Pulaski	Sherwood			2	Trammel Road	Northbound exit only
Pulaski	Sherwood			3	Wildwood Avenue / Trammel Road	No northbound access to Trammel Road
Pulaski	Sherwood			4	AR 176Y north to Brockington Road	Northbound exit and southbound entrance; southern terminus of AR 176Y
Pulaski	Sherwood			5	AR 176 west (Kiehl Avenue)	Eastern terminus of AR 176
Pulaski	Jacksonville			6	I-440 west – Memphis, Texarkana	Current eastern terminus and exit 13 on I-440
Pulaski	Jacksonville			8	Redmond Road	Northbound exit and southbound entrance
Pulaski	Jacksonville			9	Main Street	
Pulaski	Jacksonville			10A	James Street	
Pulaski	Jacksonville			10B	1st Street / JP Wright Loop Road	
Pulaski	Jacksonville			11	AR 161 south / Vandenberg Boulevard	Northern terminus of AR 161
Lonoke				16	AR 5 north / AR 321 north / AR 367 north – Heber Springs, Cabot	Signed as exits 16A (AR 321) and exit 16B (AR 5) northbound
Lonoke	Cabot			19	AR 89 – Cabot	
Lonoke	Cabot			21	AR 38 east – Cabot	Western terminus of AR 38
Lonoke	Austin			22	AR 305 – Austin	
Lonoke	Ward			25	AR 319 – Ward	
White	Beebe			28	US 64 west / US 67B north – Beebe, Conway	Southern end of US 64 concurrency; southern terminus of US 67B
White	Beebe			29	AR 367S south – Beebe	Northern terminus of AR 367S
White	Beebe			31	US 67B south / AR 31 – Beebe, Antioch	Northern terminus of US 67B
White				35	AR 13 – McRae, Garner	Former AR 371
White	Searcy			42	US 67B north / AR 367 south – Searcy, Garner	Southern terminus of US 67B; northern terminus of AR 367
White	Searcy			44	AR 367 – Searcy	
White	Searcy			45	AR 36 west / AR 367 – Searcy	AR 367 not signed; eastern terminus of AR 36
White	Searcy			46	US 67B south / AR 36 east – Searcy, Kensett	Northern terminus of US 67B; western terminus of AR 36
White				48	AR 385 – Judsonia	
White				51	AR 157 – Judsonia	
White				54	Bald Knob Lake Road	
White	Bald Knob			55	US 64 east / US 167 north – Bald Knob, Batesville	Northern end of US 64/US 167 concurrency
White				60	Russell	Access via SE 3rd Street
White				65	AR 87 – Bradford	
Jackson				69	CR 315 – Possum Grape	
Jackson				Bridge over White River		
Jackson	Ingleside			74	AR 224 east	Western terminus of AR 224
Jackson				80	AR 14 / AR 224 west – Waldenburg	AR 224 not signed
Jackson				82	AR 17 – Newport	
Jackson	Newport			83	AR 384 – Newport	
Jackson	Newport			85	AR 18 – Newport, Grubbs	
Jackson				87	CR 43	
Jackson				95	AR 37 – Tuckerman, Grubbs	
Craighead				102	US 78 east / AR 226 – Jonesboro, Cash, Arkansas State University	Western terminus of US 78; former routing of US 67
Lawrence	Alicia			111	AR 230 to AR 91 / AR 367 – Alicia, Bono	
Lawrence	Walnut Ridge			121	US 63 / US 412 west – Hoxie, Jonesboro	Signed as exits 121A (north) and 121B (south) southbound; southern end of US 412 concurrency; former routing of US 67
Lawrence	Walnut Ridge			124	US 412 east / US 412B west – Paragould, Walnut Ridge I-57 ends	Northern end of US 412 concurrency; current northern terminus of I-57; eastern terminus of US 412B; exit number not signed
Lawrence	Walnut Ridge			Northern end of freeway section		
Lawrence	Walnut Ridge				US 67Y south to AR 34	Northern terminus of US 67Y
Lawrence	Walnut Ridge				US 67B south – Walnut Ridge Business District, truck route to US 412 west	Northern terminus of US 67B
Randolph	Shannon				AR 90 east – O'Kean	Western terminus of AR 90
Randolph	Pocahontas				AR 304 east – Sharum, Delaplaine, Black River Technical College	Western terminus of AR 304
Randolph	Pocahontas				AR 304N east	Western terminus of AR 304N
Randolph	Pocahontas			Black River Bridge over Black River		
Randolph	Pocahontas				US 62 west – Imboden	Southern end of US 62 concurrency
Randolph	Pocahontas				AR 90 north (Broadway Street) to AR 115 – Ravenden Springs, Pocahontas Business District, Historic Courthouse	
Randolph	Pocahontas				AR 166 north – Engelberg	
Randolph					US 67B north – Biggers	
Randolph	Reyno				AR 328 west – Reyno	
Clay	Datto				US 67B north – Datto	
Clay					AR 211 north – Success	
Clay					AR 980 – Airport	
Clay					AR 657 north	Future I-57; future interchange under construction
Clay	Corning				US 62 east – Business District, Piggott	Northern end of US 62 concurrency
Clay					AR 657 south	Future I-57; future interchange under construction
Clay					AR 328 west – Success	Eastern terminus of AR 328
Clay					US 67 north – St. Louis	Continuation into Missouri
1.000 mi = 1.609 km; 1.000 km = 0.621 mi: Closed/former; Concurrency terminus; Incomplete access; Unopened

== See also ==
U.S. Route 67
Previous state: Texas	Arkansas	Next state: Missouri
