= Arkansas Highway 79 =

Arkansas Highway 79 may refer to:

- Arkansas Highway 79 (1926), now numbered 115
- U.S. Route 79 in Arkansas, entered Arkansas ca. 1935
- U.S. Route 79 Business (Stuttgart, Arkansas) (sometimes shown as AR 79, for example on Google Maps)
