= Arkansas Highway 280 =

State highway in Arkansas, United States

Highway 280

Route information
- Maintained by AHTD
- Length: 5.85 mi (9.41 km)
- Existed: 1963–present

Major junctions
- West end: AR 90 north of Delaplaine
- East end: AR 90 – Peach Orchard

Location
- Country: United States
- State: Arkansas
- Counties: Greene, Clay

Highway system
- Arkansas Highway System; Interstate; US; State; Business; Spurs; Suffixed; Scenic; Heritage
| ← AR 279 | → AR 281 |

Arkansas Highway 280 is a state highway in Clay and Greene Counties. The route runs 5.85 miles (9.41 km) from Arkansas Highway 90 near Delaplaine north then east to AR 90 in Peach Orchard. It does not intersect any other state highways.

== Route description ==
First reassurance marker for AR 280 east of AR 280S in Clay County

AR 280 begins at AR 90 and heads due north to Brookings. It then turns and heads due east for 3.0 miles (4.8 km) to Peach Orchard, where it terminates at AR 90. The highway is located near the Dave Donaldson/Black River Wildlife Management Area.

== History ==
The route first became a state highway in 1963. AR 208S/AR 208 from Brookings to AR 90 was paved upon addition to the state highway system.

== Major intersections ==
| County | Location | mi | km | Destinations | Notes |
|---|---|---|---|---|---|
| Greene | Delaplaine | 0.0 | 0.0 | AR 90 | western terminus |
| Clay | Brookings | 2.9 | 4.7 | AR 280S | AR 280S eastern terminus |
| Clay | Peach Orchard | 5.85 | 9.41 | AR 90 – Knobel, Walnut Ridge | eastern terminus |
1.000 mi = 1.609 km; 1.000 km = 0.621 mi

== Brookings spur ==
Highway 280S
- Location: Brookings
- Length: 0.47 mi (760 m)
- Existed: 1963–present

Arkansas Highway 280 Spur is a 0.47 miles (0.76 km) spur route to the unincorporated community of Brookings in Clay County.

=== Major intersections ===
End state maintenance for AR 280S at the Black River

The entire route is in Brookings, Clay County.

| mi | km | Destinations | Notes |
|---|---|---|---|
| 0.0 | 0.0 | AR 280 | eastern terminus |
| 0.47 | 0.76 | Black River | western terminus |
1.000 mi = 1.609 km; 1.000 km = 0.621 mi

== See also ==
- List of state highways in Arkansas
