= Poca Hollow =

Valley in Carter County, Missouri, United States

Coordinates: 36.9508853°N 91.0840176°W

Poca Hollow is a valley in Carter County in the U.S. state of Missouri.

Poca Hollow derives its name from nearby Pocahontas, Arkansas.
