= Maynard High School =

Maynard High School may refer to:

In the United States:

- Maynard High School (Arkansas), based in Maynard, Arkansas.
- Maynard High School (Massachusetts), based in Maynard, Massachusetts.
- Maynard Evans High School, based in Orlando, Florida.
- Maynard H. Jackson High School, based in Atlanta, Georgia.

In the United Kingdom:

- The Maynard School, based in Exeter, Devon, England.
