= Arkansas Highway 90 =

State highway in Arkansas, United States

Highway 90

Route information
- Maintained by ArDOT
- Length: 81.93 mi (131.85 km)
- Existed: 1926–present

Major junctions
- West end: Main Street in Ravenden
- US 62 / US 63 / US 412 in Ravenden; US 62 / US 67 / AR 166 in Pocahontas; US 49 / AR 1 in Rector
- East end: Route 84 at the Missouri state line near Rector

Location
- Country: United States
- State: Arkansas
- Counties: Lawrence, Randolph, Greene, Clay

Highway system
- Arkansas Highway System; Interstate; US; State; Business; Spurs; Suffixed; Scenic; Heritage
← AR 89	→ AR 91

Arkansas Highway 90 (AR 90, Ark. 90, and Hwy. 90) is an east–west state highway in northeast Arkansas. The route of 81.93 miles (131.85 km) runs from Main Street in Ravenden to Route 84 at the Missouri state line. The route is an entirely undivided surface highway that passes through rich cotton country.

== Route description ==
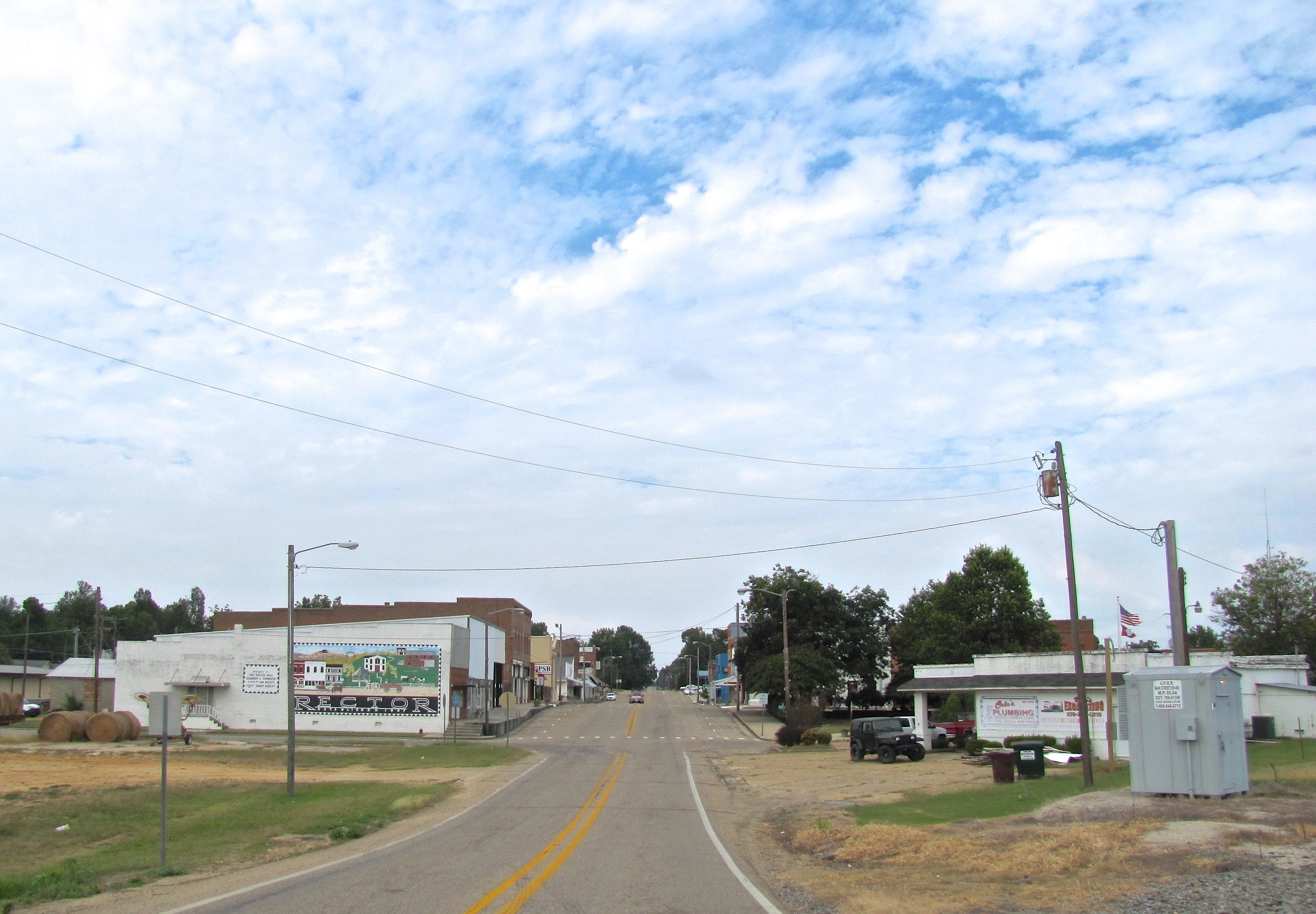
AR 90 (Main Street) in Rector, October 2017

AR 90 begins at Main Street in Ravenden and heads north to cross US 62/US 63/US 412. The route winds to Pocahontas where it meets AR 115 and US 62/US 67/AR 166. US 67/AR 90 run together south to Shannon. AR 90 then turns east to meet AR 231 and AR 34 in O'Kean. The route runs diagonally northeast until meeting AR 135 east of Knobel.

The route runs east to meet AR 141 near Boydsville, Arkansas and US 49/AR 1 in Rector. AR 90 continues west to terminate at Route 84 at the St. Francis River on the Missouri state line.

== Major intersections ==
Mile markers reset at concurrencies. (Note: Although Arkansas highways normally terminate when intersected by a route of greater importance, Highway 90 in Randolph County does not end when intersecting Highway 34 in O'Kean.)

County	Location	mi	km	Destinations	Notes
Lawrence	Ravenden	0.00	0.00	Main Street	Western terminus
Lawrence	Ravenden	0.40	0.64	US 62 / US 63 / US 412 – Hoxie, Hardy	
Randolph		15.22	24.49	AR 93 north – Dalton	
Randolph	Pocahontas	25.38	40.85	AR 115 north (Mansker Drive) – Maynard	
Randolph	Pocahontas	26.47	42.60	US 62 west / US 67 south	
Randolph	Pocahontas	US 62 / US 67 concurrency west, 0.4 miles (0.64 km)			
Randolph	Pocahontas	US 67 concurrency south, 2.8 miles (4.5 km)			
Randolph	Shannon	0.00	0.00	US 67 north	
Randolph		8.75	14.08	AR 231 north	
Randolph	O'Kean	10.69	17.20	AR 34 west – Walnut Ridge	
Greene	Delaplaine	17.50	28.16	AR 34 east / AR 304 west to US 67 – Beech Grove	
Greene		18.24	29.35	AR 280 east – Brookings	
Clay	Peach Orchard	22.25	35.81	AR 280 west – Brookings	
Clay		31.18	50.18	AR 135 south – Paragould	
Clay	AR 135 concurrency north, 1.0 mile (1.6 km)				
Clay		0.00	0.00	AR 135 north – Corning	
Clay	Tipperary	4.52	7.27	AR 141 south – Knob	
Clay	Boydsville	7.85	12.63	AR 141 north to US 62 – McDougal	
Clay	Rector	17.06	27.46	US 49 east / AR 1 north	
Clay	US 49 / AR 1 concurrency east, 3.0 miles (4.8 km)				
Clay	Hargrave Corner	0.00	0.00	US 49 west / AR 1 south	
Clay		2.06	3.32	AR 139 south – Leonard	
Clay	Holly Island	4.05	6.52	AR 139 north to US 62	
Arkansas–Missouri state line		7.22	11.62	Route 84 – Kennett	
1.000 mi = 1.609 km; 1.000 km = 0.621 mi: Concurrency terminus
