= Davidsonville Historic State Park =

State park in Arkansas, United States

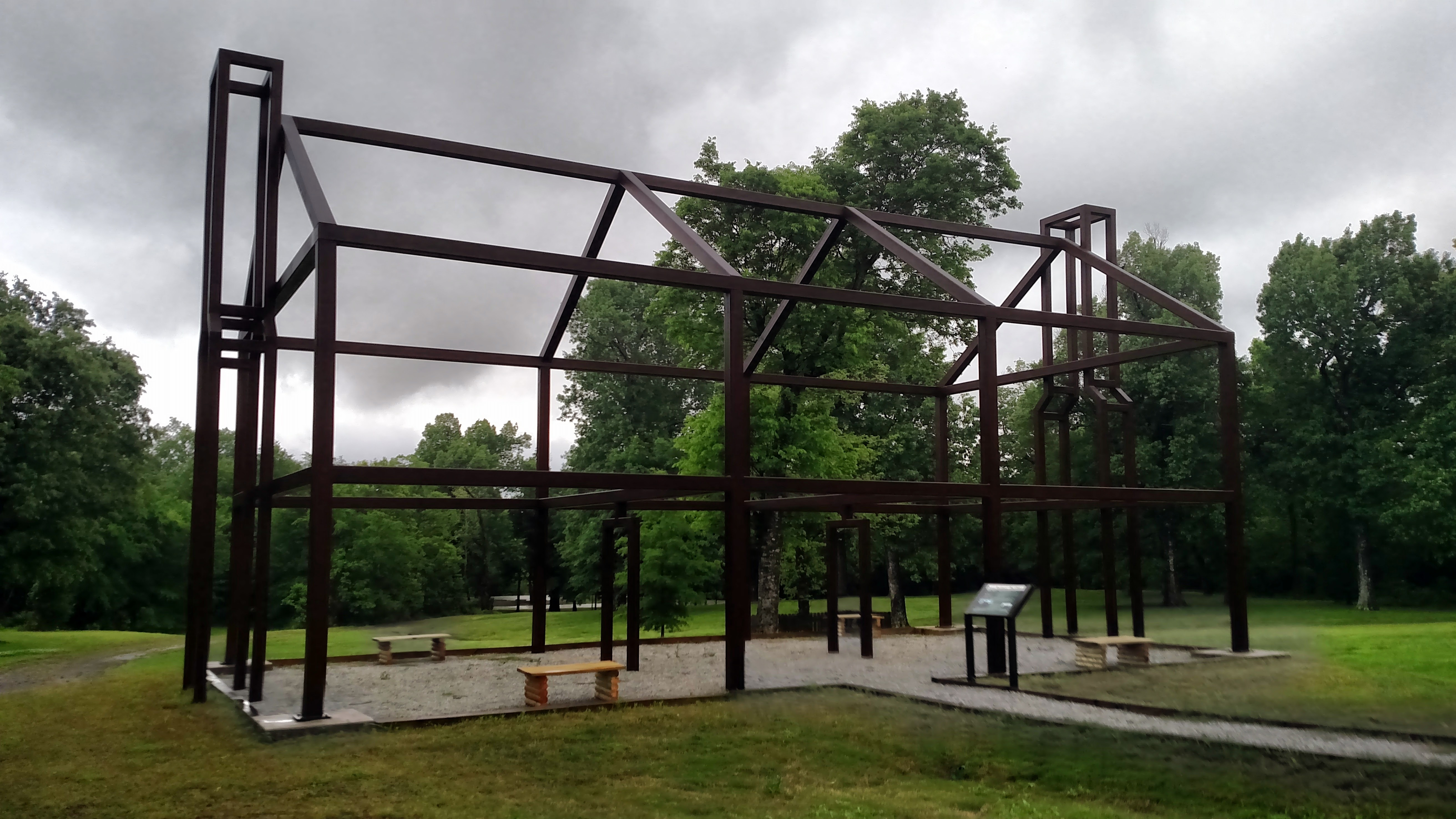
- "Ghost structure" at the Davidsonville town site to illustrate a former structure

- Location within Arkansas Location within the United States
- Interactive map of Davidsonville Historic State Park
- Location: Pocahontas, Arkansas, United States
- Coordinates: 36°09′30″N 91°03′25″W
- Area: 163 acres (66 ha)
- Elevation: 226 ft (69 m)
- Established: 1957
- Administrator: Arkansas Department of Parks, Heritage and Tourism
- Website: Official website

Davidsonville Historic State Park (formerly Old Davidsonville State Park) is a 163-acre (66 ha) Arkansas state park in Randolph County, Arkansas in the United States. Situated on a border between The Ozarks and the Arkansas Delta, the park preserves the remains of the abandoned frontier town of Davidsonville. The town was one of Arkansas Territory's first settlements when founded in 1815, serving as an important river port town on the Black River. The former townsite was made into a state park in 1957 and a monument was added to the National Register of Historic Places in 1974.

== History ==
=== Davidsonville ===
There is evidence that the site was occupied by French colonists prior to the 1803 Louisiana Purchase. Archeologists have discovered evidence of Native American use of the site as early as 4,000 BC. The 1822 courthouse was apparently built on top of an Indian mound which was built before 1,100 AD.

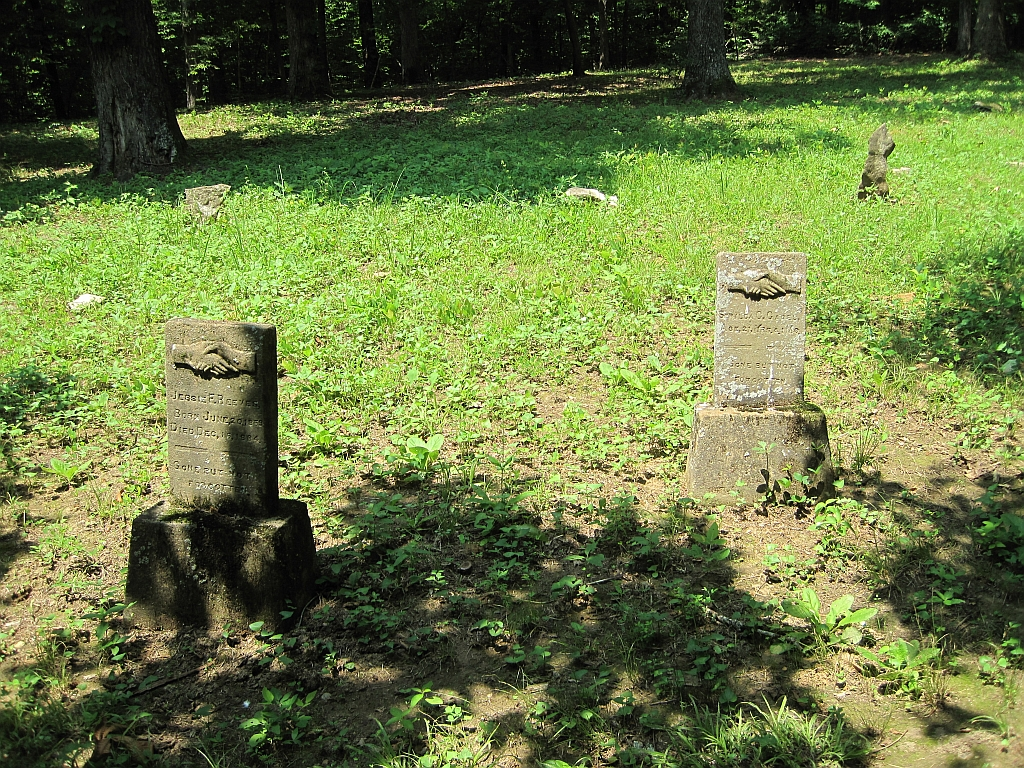
Headstones in the Phillip-Reeve Cemetery, 2011.

Davidsonville was founded in 1815 and rapidly became the most important town in northeast Arkansas Territory, but was abandoned by the 1830s. The community served as a river port town on the west bank of the Black River, near the confluence of the Spring River and Eleven Point River with the Black River. The town was on important stop on the Southwest Trail and featured several important frontier establishments. In 1817 the first post office of Arkansas Territory opened in the town, followed in 1820 by the first United States General Land Office of the territory. In 1822, the first courthouse of Arkansas Territory was built in Davidsonville. The town became the county seat of Lawrence County, which at the time comprised roughly the northern third of Arkansas.

Shortly after the town's founding the Southwest Trail was rerouted onto higher ground, bypassing Davidsonville. New towns appeared along the trail's new route, diminishing Davidsonville's importance. In 1828 the land office was moved to Batesville, about 60 miles (97 km) southwest. In 1829 the county seat and courthouse began a series of moves to a number of other towns. Today there are very few remains above ground. The townsite, which had been a grid of streets with a central square where the courthouse stood, now looks like a grassy field with a few trees. Only upon closer inspection does one begin to see hints of the former town. The park's interpretive signs point out where certain buildings used to stand. There are two small cemeteries. By the time of Arkansas statehood in 1836, Davidsonville was essentially abandoned.

=== Park history ===
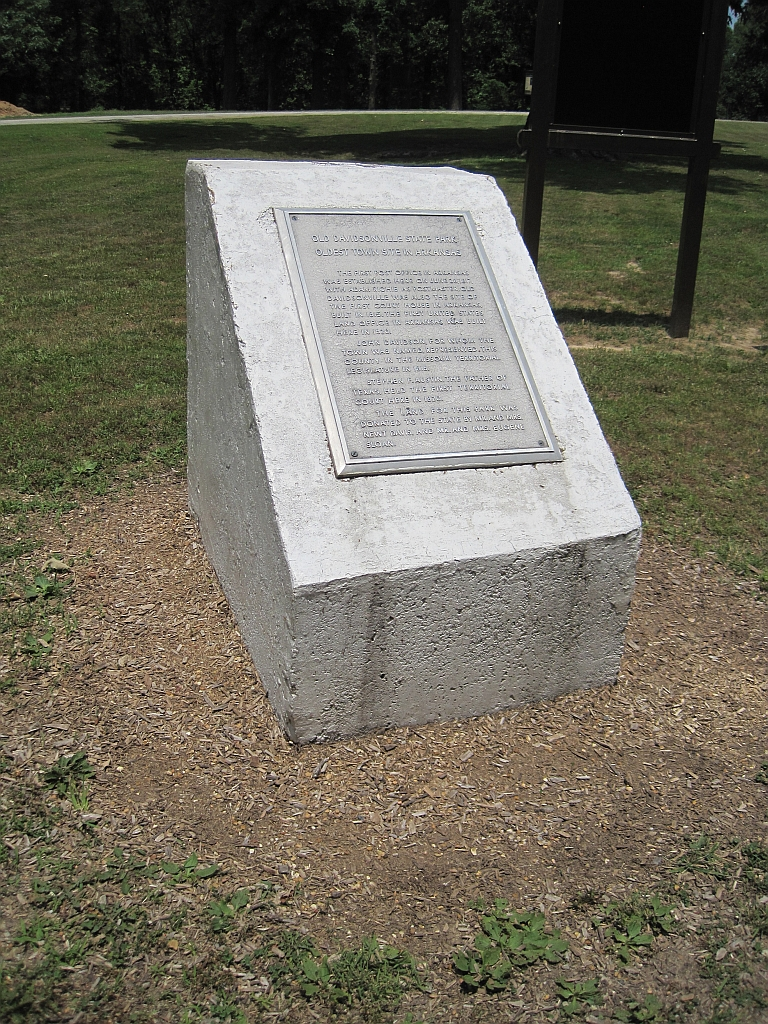
Monument marking the old town site of Davidsonville, 2011

After the creation of Arkansas Post National Memorial in 1929, the Arkansas State Legislature passed Act 418 on March 28, 1957, though funding to develop the area into a state park was not approved until 1979. The park offers interpretive programs, camping, hiking, fishing, and canoeing. Park facilities were originally built on the old townsite. The site was listed on the U.S. National Register of Historic Places in 1974 as "Old Davidsonville State Historic Monument", also known as Lawrence-Davidsonville. During the 1980s the townsite was cleared in order to facilitate archeological studies. The park facilities are now located on nearby ridges. The first careful archeological study was conducted in 1972, and several others followed.

== Recreation ==
Although one of Arkansas's historic state parks, there are opportunities for recreation at Davidsonville Historic State Park also. Fishing is available on the Black River, Eleven Point River, Spring River, and a small fishing pond within the park. An interpretive guide is available for tours of the original platted site year round. Amenities include trails, picnic tables, a visitor center and 25 campsites.

== See also ==
- Arkansas Highway 166
- Historic Washington State Park
