= Arkansas Highway 62 =

Arkansas Highway 62 may refer to:

- Arkansas Highway 62 (1926), now numbered 34 and 90
- U.S. Route 62 in Arkansas, created ca. 1930
