= Arkansas Highway 211 =

State highway in Arkansas, United States

Highway 211

Route information
- Maintained by ArDOT
- Length: 9.68 mi (15.58 km)

Major junctions
- South end: Future I-57 / US 62 / US 67 north of Datto
- North end: Route E at the Missouri state line in Current View

Location
- Country: United States
- State: Arkansas
- Counties: Clay

Highway system
- Arkansas Highway System; Interstate; US; State; Business; Spurs; Suffixed; Scenic; Heritage
← AR 210	→ AR 212

Arkansas Highway 211 (AR 211 and Hwy. 211) is a north–south state highway in Clay County, Arkansas. The route of 9.68 miles (15.58 km) runs from US 62/US 67 (Future I-57) near Datto north through Success to the Missouri state line.

== Route description ==
AR 211 begins at US 62/US 67 (Future I-57) north of Datto. AR 211 runs north to Success, when the route serves as the northern terminus of AR 328. The route meets Missouri supplemental route E at the Missouri state line, where the route terminates.

== Major intersections ==
The entire route is in Clay County.

Location	mi	km	Destinations	Notes
	0.0	0.0	US 62 / US 67 (Future I-57) – Corning, Pocahontas	
Success	4.64	7.47	AR 328 east (McCracken St)	
	9.68	15.58	Route E	Continuation beyond Missouri state line
1.000 mi = 1.609 km; 1.000 km = 0.621 mi

== See also ==
- List of state highways in Arkansas
