= Current View, Arkansas and Missouri =

Unincorporated community in Arkansas and Missouri, US

Coordinates: 36°29′56″N 90°46′41″W

Current View is an unincorporated community in Clay County, Arkansas and Ripley County, Missouri, United States. The community straddles the Missouri–Arkansas border on the northeast bank of the Current River. Arkansas Highway 211 connects to the south and Missouri Route E is to the north. Doniphan, Missouri lies approximately eight miles to the north-northwest and Success, Arkansas is about five miles south.

== History ==
A variant name was "Currentview". A post office called Currentview was established in 1895, and remained in operation until 1913. The community was named for its location near the Current River.
