= Arkansas Highway 328 =

State highway in Arkansas, United States

Highway 328
- AR 328 highlighted in red

Route information
- Maintained by ArDOT
- Existed: 1965–present

Section 1
- Length: 18.37 mi (29.56 km)
- West end: AR 251
- East end: US 62 / US 67 in Reyno

Section 2
- Length: 7.81 mi (12.57 km)
- West end: AR 211 in Success
- East end: US 67

Location
- Country: United States
- State: Arkansas
- Counties: Randolph, Clay

Highway system
- Arkansas Highway System; Interstate; US; State; Business; Spurs; Suffixed; Scenic; Heritage
← AR 327	→ AR 329

Highway 328 (AR 328, Ark. 328, and Hwy. 328) is a designation of two east–west state highway in Northeast Arkansas, United States. One route begins at Highway 251 and runs east 18.37 miles (29.56 km) to US 62/US 67 in Reyno. A second highway begins at Highway 211 in Success and runs 7.81 miles (12.57 km) to US 67. The first segment was created in 1965, with the Clay County route forming in 1973. The route is maintained by the Arkansas Department of Transportation (ArDOT). A small portion of the route is designated as an Arkansas Heritage Trail for its use as the Trail of Tears during the Indian Removal.

== Route description ==
=== Randolph County ===
Highway 328 begins in centrally located Randolph County at an intersection with Highway 251 between Ingram and Attica. The highway runs northeast through sparsely populated areas of the Ozark Highlands and crossing Fourche River. Entering Maynard has a junction with Highway 115/Highway 166. Highway 166 and Highway 328 briefly concur eastward through Maynard before the former turns northward. Highway 328 continues easterly, crossing into the flatter terrain of the Mississippi Alluvial Plain before turning due south as a section line road, crossing the Current River, and running to Reyno. In Reyno, the route intersects US 62/US 67, where it terminates.

The ArDOT maintains Highway 328 like all other parts of the state highway system. As a part of these responsibilities, the department tracks the volume of traffic using its roads in surveys using a metric called average annual daily traffic (AADT). ArDOT estimates the traffic level for a segment of roadway for any average day of the year in these surveys. For 2016, the highest traffic levels were estimated in Reyno, with 620 vehicles per day (VPD). The remainder of the highway averaged under 600 VPD, with the exception of the concurrency with Highway 166, which averaged 1,300 VPD.

=== Clay County ===
Highway 328 begins at an intersection with Highway 211 (Stephens Street) in Success in western Clay County 3 miles (4.8 km) east of the Current River, and 3 miles (4.8 km) south of the Missouri border. It runs due east as a section line road until terminating at an intersection with US 67.

As of 2016, the route had an annual average daily traffic (AADT) of 660 vehicles per day (VPD).

== Major intersections ==
Mile markers reset at concurrencies.

County	Location	mi	km	Destinations	Notes
Randolph		0.00	0.00	AR 251 – Warm Springs, Pocahontas	Western terminus
Randolph	Maynard	7.34	11.81	AR 115 / AR 166 south – Pocahontas	Begin AR 116 overlap
Randolph	Maynard	0.00	0.00	AR 166 – Supply	End AR 116 overlap
Randolph		16.41	26.41	Bridge over the Current River	
Randolph	Reyno	18.37	29.56	US 62 / US 67 – Pocahontas, Corning	Eastern terminus
Gap in route
Clay	Success	0.00	0.00	AR 211 (Stephens Street)	Western terminus
Clay		7.81	12.57	US 67 – Pocahontas, Poplar Bluff, MO	Eastern terminus
1.000 mi = 1.609 km; 1.000 km = 0.621 mi: Concurrency terminus

== See also ==
- List of state highways in Arkansas
