= Arkansas Highway 34 =

State highway in Arkansas, United States

Highway 34

Route information
- Maintained by ArDOT
- Existed: 1926–present

Section 1
- Length: 27.22 mi (43.81 km)
- West end: US 67B / US 412B / AR 367 in Walnut Ridge
- Major intersections: AR 90 from O'Kean to Delaplaine
- East end: AR 135 in Oak Grove Heights

Section 2
- Length: 12.96 mi (20.86 km)
- West end: AR 135 in Lafe
- Major intersections: US 49 in Marmaduke
- East end: AR 139 at Fritz

Location
- Country: United States
- State: Arkansas
- Counties: Lawrence, Randolph, Greene

Highway system
- Arkansas Highway System; Interstate; US; State; Business; Spurs; Suffixed; Scenic; Heritage
← AR 33	→ AR 35

Arkansas Highway 34 (AR 34) is a designation for two state highways in the Upper Arkansas Delta. One segment of 27.22 miles (43.81 km) runs from US 412B in Walnut Ridge east to Highway 135 in Oak Grove Heights. A second segment of 12.96 miles (20.86 km) runs from Highway 135 in Lafe east to Highway 139 at Fritz. Both routes are maintained by the Arkansas State Highway and Transportation Department (AHTD).

== Route description ==
=== Walnut Ridge to Oak Grove Heights ===
Highway 34 begins at US 67B/US 412B and Highway 367 in Walnut Ridge and runs northeast under US 67, before meeting Highway 231 at Giles. The route meets Highway 90 in O'Kean, and runs concurrently with it northeast to Delaplaine. Highway 34 turns south in Delaplaine to Evening Star, when it heads east to meet Highway 141 in Beech Grove. The route continues east to Oak Grove Heights, where it terminates at Highway 135.

=== Lafe to Fritz ===
The route begins at Highway 135 in Lafe and runs east to Marmaduke, where it crosses US 49. Highway 34 continues east to Fritz, where it terminates at Highway 139.

== Major intersections ==
Mile markers reset at concurrencies.

County	Location	mi	km	Destinations	Notes
Lawrence	Walnut Ridge	0.00	0.00	US 67B north / US 412B / AR 367 south	Western terminus; southern terminus of US 67B; northern terminus of AR 367
Lawrence	Walnut Ridge	1.24	2.00	US 67Y north to US 67	Southern terminus of US 67Y
Lawrence	Giles	5.77	9.29	AR 231 south to US 412	Northern terminus of AR 231
Randolph	O'Kean	10.58	17.03	AR 90 west to I-57 / US 67 – Fender	Western end of AR 90 concurrency
Greene	Delaplaine	0.00	0.00	AR 90 east / AR 304 west to I-57 / US 67 – Knobel	Eastern end of AR 90 concurrency; eastern terminus of AR 304
Greene	Beech Grove	9.31	14.98	AR 141 to US 412 / AR 135	
Greene	Oak Grove Heights	16.64	26.78	AR 135 – Paragould, Lafe, Corning	Eastern terminus
Greene	Gap in route				
Greene	Lafe	0.00	0.00	AR 135 – Paragould, Corning	Western terminus
Greene	Marmaduke	7.36	11.84	US 49	
Greene	Fritz	12.96	20.86	AR 139 – Rector, Mounds	Eastern terminus
1.000 mi = 1.609 km; 1.000 km = 0.621 mi: Concurrency terminus

== See also ==
- List of state highways in Arkansas
