= Arkansas Highway 251 =

State highway in Arkansas, United States

Highway 251

Route information
- Maintained by ArDOT
- Length: 15.28 mi (24.59 km)
- Existed: July 10, 1957–present

Major junctions
- South end: AR 115 north of Pocahontas
- North end: Route P at the Missouri state line in Warm Springs

Location
- Country: United States
- State: Arkansas
- Counties: Randolph

Highway system
- Arkansas Highway System; Interstate; US; State; Business; Spurs; Suffixed; Scenic; Heritage
← AR 250	→ AR 252

Highway 251 (AR 251, Ark. 251, and Hwy. 251) is a north–south state highway in Randolph County, Arkansas. The highway begins near Pocahontas and runs north to the Missouri state line. The route is maintained by the Arkansas Department of Transportation (ArDOT).

== Route description ==
Highway 251 is a two-lane undivided highway. No segment of Highway 251 has been listed as part of the National Highway System, a network of roads important to the nation's economy, defense, and mobility.

Highway 251 begins north of Pocahontas in Randolph County in a transition zone between the Arkansas Delta and Ozark Mountains. Running north from the southern terminus at Highway 115, the highway travels through a rural area, with homes becoming more sparsely distributed as it continues north. Highway 251 serves as a terminus for two minor state highways on the path north, and passes near the Robert L. Hankins Mud Creek Wildlife Management Area. Continuing north, the highway passes through the unincorporated community of Warm Springs near the Missouri state line, where the highway terminates. The roadway continues north as Missouri supplemental route P.

== Major intersections ==
The entire route is in Randolph County.

Location	mi	km	Destinations	Notes
	0.0	0.0	AR 115 – Maynard, Pocahontas	Southern terminus
	5.14	8.27	AR 328 east – Maynard	
Ingram	7.54	12.13	AR 231 west	
	15.28	24.59	Route P	Northern terminus
1.000 mi = 1.609 km; 1.000 km = 0.621 mi

== History ==
Highway 251 was created on July 10, 1957, by the Arkansas State Highway Commission during a period of expansion in the state highway system. The Arkansas General Assembly passed the Act 148 of 1957, the Milum Road Act, creating 10–12 miles (16–19 km) of new state highways in each county. It started at Highway 115 and ran north for 12 miles (19 km) toward Warm Springs. It was extended to the state line on June 29, 1960.

== See also ==
- List of state highways in Arkansas
