= Maynard School District =

School district in Arkansas, United States

Address
- 74 Campus Drive Maynard, Arkansas, 72444; United States

District information
- Type: Public
- Grades: PreK–12
- NCES District ID: 0509570

Students and staff
- Students: 540
- Teachers: 65.45
- Staff: 45.81
- Student–teacher ratio: 8.25

Other information
- Website: maynard.nesc.k12.ar.us

Maynard School District is a public school district based in Maynard, Arkansas, United States.

== History ==
On July 1, 2010, the Twin Rivers School District was dissolved. A portion of the district was given to the Maynard district.

== Schools ==
- Maynard Elementary School, serving kindergarten through grade 6.
- Maynard High School, serving grades 7 through 12.
