= Arkansas Highway 166 =

State highway in Arkansas, United States

Highway 166

Route information
- Maintained by ArDOT

Section 1
- Length: 7.97 mi (12.83 km)
- South end: AR 361 at Davidsonville Historic State Park
- North end: US 62 in Pocahontas

Section 2
- Length: 14.57 mi (23.45 km)
- South end: Future I-57 / US 62 / US 67 in Pocahontas
- North end: Route A / Route Y at Missouri state line in Glaze Creek

Location
- Country: United States
- State: Arkansas
- Counties: Randolph

Highway system
- Arkansas Highway System; Interstate; US; State; Business; Spurs; Suffixed; Scenic; Heritage
← US 165	→ US 167

Arkansas Highway 166 is a designation for two state highways in Randolph County, Arkansas. The southern segment of 7.97 miles (12.83 km) runs from Old Davidsonville State Park to Pocahontas. A northern segment of 14.57 miles (23.45 km) runs north from US 62/US 67 to the Missouri state line.

== Route description ==
=== Davidsonville Historic State Park to Pocahontas ===
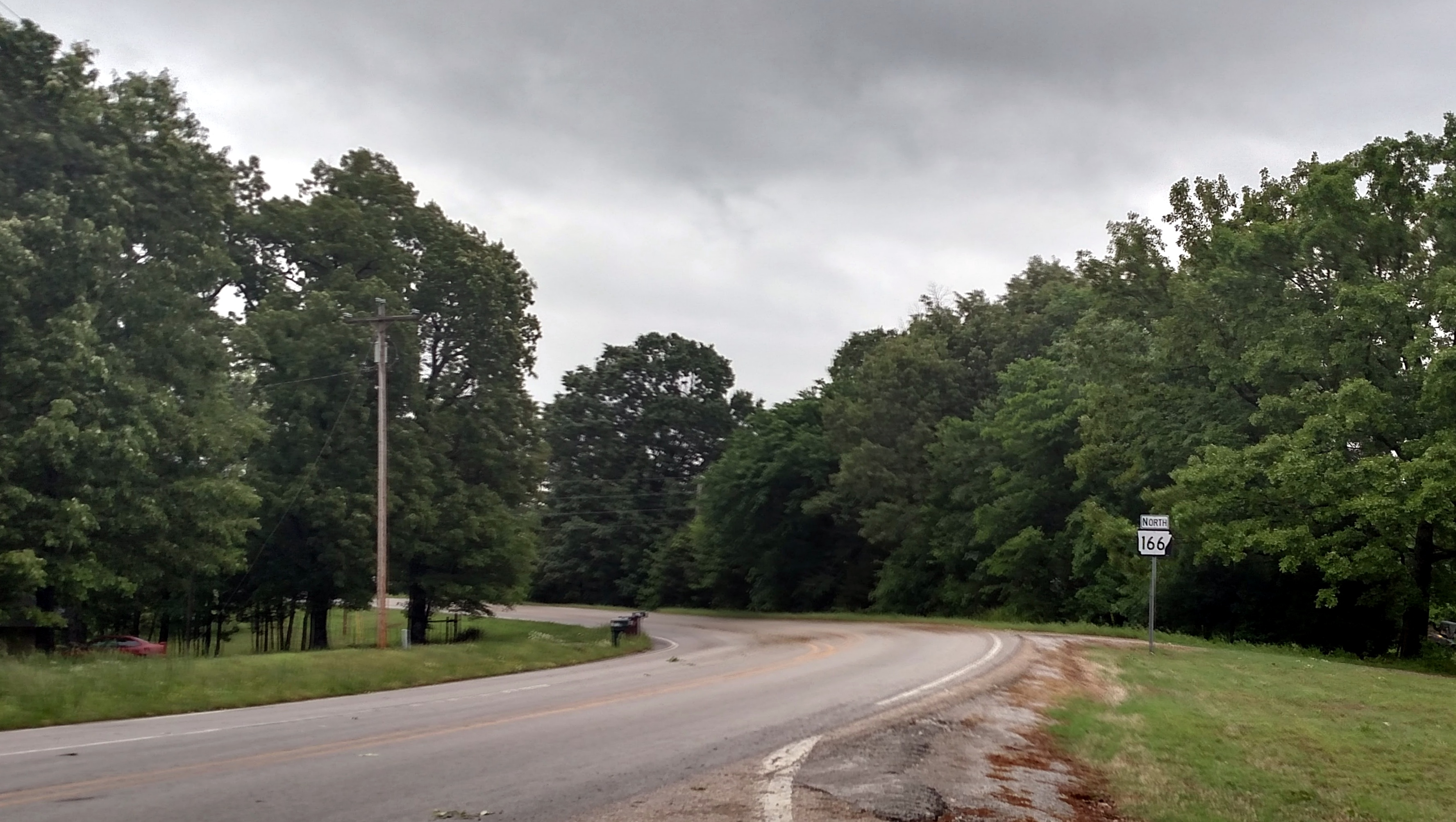
Highway 166 near Davidsonville Historic State Park

AR 166 begins at Davidsonville Historic State Park in southwest Randolph County. The route runs north to meet US Route 62 in south Pocahontas. The route is entirely two-lane, undivided.

=== Pocahontas to Missouri ===
AR 166 begins at US 62/US 67 (Future I-57) in east Pocahontas. The route runs north to meet AR 115 at Stokes and AR 328 in Maynard. AR 166 then trails north through Supply and Minorea to the Missouri state line, where it terminates at Missouri supplemental routes A/Y.

== Major intersections ==
Mile markers reset at concurrencies. The entire route is in Randolph County.

Location	mi	km	Destinations	Notes
Davidsonville Historic State Park	0.0	0.0	Roadway continues as AR 361 – Black Rock	southern terminus, AR 361 northern terminus
Pocahontas	7.97	12.83	US 62 west – Imboden	northern terminus
Pocahontas	Gap in route			
Pocahontas	0.0	0.0	US 62 east / US 67 north (Future I-57) – Corning	southern terminus
Stokes	7.47	12.02	AR 115 south – Pocahontas	
AR 115 concurrency north, 4.9 miles (7.9 km)
Maynard	0.0	0.0	AR 115 north / AR 328 west – Doniphan MO, Maynard Pioneer Museum	AR 328 concurency east
Maynard	0.47	0.76	AR 328 east – Reyno	AR 328 concurrency ends
	7.10	11.43	Route A / Route Y	Continuation into Missouri
1.000 mi = 1.609 km; 1.000 km = 0.621 mi: Concurrency terminus

== See also ==
- List of state highways in Arkansas
