= Arkansas Highway 304 =

State highway in Arkansas, United States

Highway 304

Route information
- Maintained by ArDOT
- Length: 14.72 mi (23.69 km)
- Existed: April 24, 1963–present

Major junctions
- West end: US 67 / AR 90 in Pocahontas
- AR 231 near Sharum
- East end: AR 34 / AR 90 in Delaplaine

Location
- Country: United States
- State: Arkansas
- Counties: Greene, Randolph

Highway system
- Arkansas Highway System; Interstate; US; State; Business; Spurs; Suffixed; Scenic; Heritage
← AR 303	→ AR 305

Arkansas Highway 304 (AR 304, Hwy. 304) is an east–west state highway in Arkansas. The route of 14.72 miles (23.69 km) runs from US Route 67 (US 67) and Highway 90 in south Pocahontas east to Highway 34/Highway 90 in Delaplaine.

== Route description ==
Highway 304 begins at US 67 south of Pocahontas. The route heads east past Nick Wilson Field and Black River Technical College to meet Highway 304N. Highway 304 has a junction with Highway 231 near Sharum before entering Greene County. Highway 304 continues east to Delaplaine, where it meets AR 34/AR 90 and terminates.

== History ==
Highway 304 was added to the state highway system as part of a large transfer of county roads to the state system that took place on April 24, 1963. Initially only the portion from US 67 to the Greene County line was transferred to state maintenance.

== Major intersections ==
County	Location	mi	km	Destinations	Notes
Randolph	Pocahontas	0.00	0.00	US 67 / AR 90 – Walnut Ridge, Pocahontas	Western terminus
Randolph	Pocahontas	0.78	1.26	AR 304N north (Industrial Drive)	
Randolph		6.70	10.78	AR 231 south	
Greene	Delaplaine	14.72	23.69	AR 34 (Main Street) / AR 90 – Beech Grove, Knobel, Walnut Ridge	Eastern terminus
1.000 mi = 1.609 km; 1.000 km = 0.621 mi

== Pocahontas northern route ==
Highway 304N
- Location: Pocahontas
- Length: 1.88 mi (3.03 km)

Arkansas Highway 304N (AR 304N, Hwy. 304N) is an alternate route of 1.88 miles (3.03 km) in Pocahontas. The highway runs from US 167/Highway 90 south to Highway 304.

=== Major intersections ===
The entire route is in Pocahontas, Randolph County.

mi	km	Destinations	Notes
0.0	0.0	US 67 / AR 90	Western terminus
2.39	3.85	AR 304	Eastern terminus
1.000 mi = 1.609 km; 1.000 km = 0.621 mi

== See also ==
- List of state highways in Arkansas
