= Maynard Pioneer Museum =

Coordinates: 36.4164°N 90.9071°W

- Established: 1979
- Location: Maynard, AR
- Type: Living history museum

The Maynard Pioneer Museum and Park is a museum and park located within Maynard, Arkansas.

== Collection ==
The centerpiece of the museum is a log cabin dating to the late 19th and early 20th century, with original furnishings and historic newspaper clippings. There are also a variety of period photographs donated by local Randolph County residents. A museum annex was built in 1982, housing examples of period furniture and other objects.

== Events ==
Every year, the Maynard Pioneer Museum holds "Pioneer Day". Students from Maynard High School set up booths and games for the day. The events include a "You might be a redneck" joke competition and a Pet Parade.
