= Little Missouri River Bridge =

- U.S. National Register of Historic Places
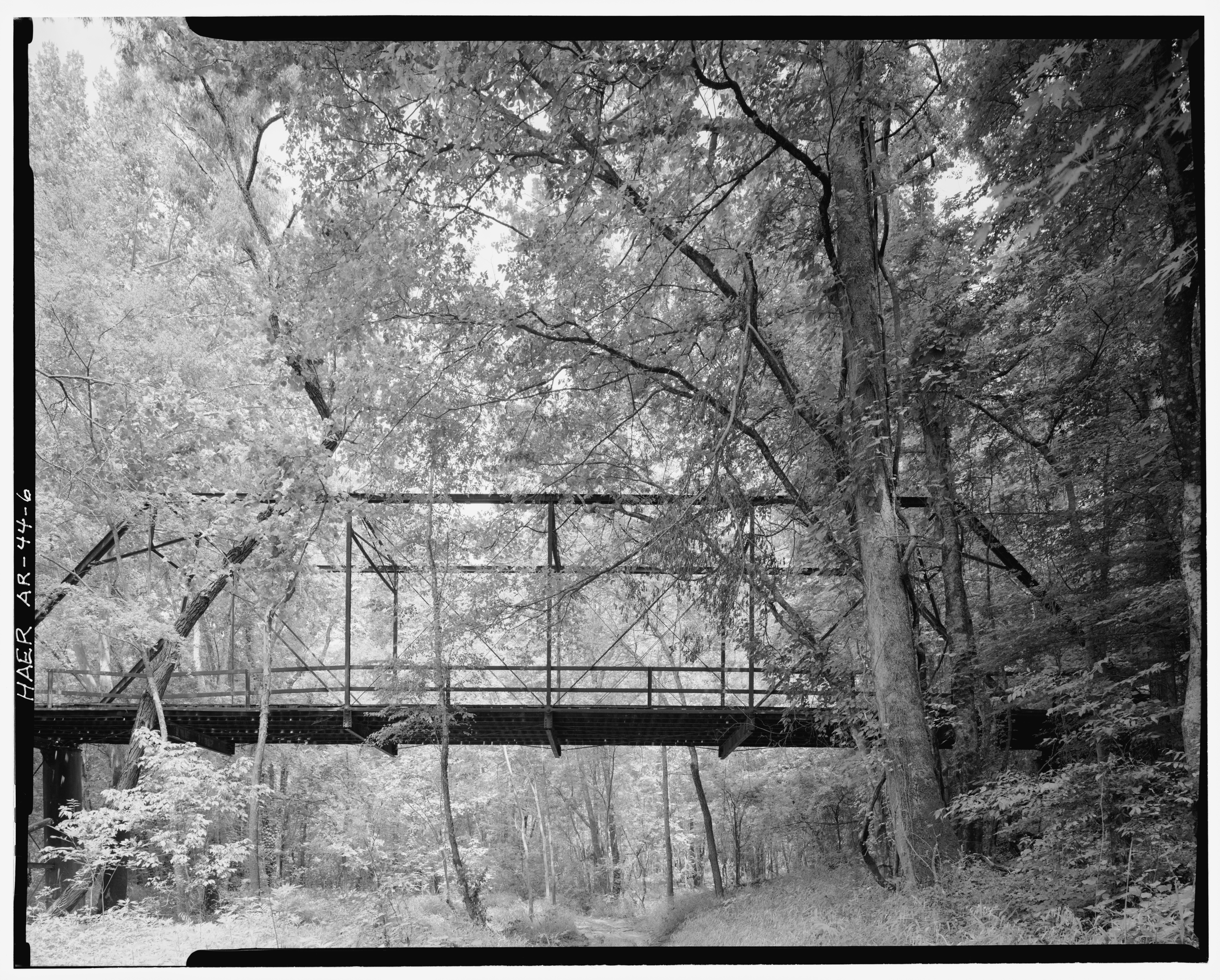
- View of the secondary Pratt truss, 1988

- Location within Arkansas Location within the United States
- Nearest city: Prescott, Arkansas
- Coordinates: 33°54′12″N 93°18′34″W
- Area: less than one acre
- Built: 1910
- Architectural style: Camelback Pratt
- MPS: Historic Bridges of Arkansas MPS
- NRHP reference No.: 90000536
- Added to NRHP: April 9, 1990

The Little Missouri River Bridge, also known as the Nachitoch Bluff Bridge, is a historic bridge between rural southern Clark County, Arkansas and Nevada County, Arkansas. Now closed to traffic, it once carried County Road 179 (apparently now numbered CR 479) over the Little Missouri River. Believed to be built in 1910, it is the only known Camelback Pratt truss bridge in the state. Its main span measures 185 feet (56 m), with a secondary Pratt truss span measuring 110 feet (34 m) in length, and there are I-beam-supported approaches on either side, giving the bridge a total length of 315 feet (96 m). The bridge is located on the historic route of the Natchitoches Trace, an early colonial French-Spanish trail through the area.

The bridge was listed on the National Register of Historic Places in 1990.

== See also ==
- List of bridges documented by the Historic American Engineering Record in Arkansas
- List of bridges on the National Register of Historic Places in Arkansas
- National Register of Historic Places listings in Clark County, Arkansas
