= KPOC (AM) =

- Pocahontas, Arkansas; United States
- Frequency: 1420 kHz

Programming
- Format: Contemporary Christian
- Affiliations: Salem Music Network

Ownership
- Owner: Combined Media Group
- Sister stations: KPOC-FM

History
- First air date: 1950

Technical information
- Licensing authority: FCC
- Facility ID: 59408
- Class: D
- Power: 1,000 watts day 118 watts night
- Transmitter coordinates: 36°16′37.4″N 90°57′16.6″W
- Translator: 96.5 K243CR (Pocahontas)

Links
- Public license information: Public file; LMS

KPOC (1420 AM) is a radio station running Salem Music Network's "Today's Christian Music" format. Licensed to Pocahontas, Arkansas, United States. The station is currently owned by Combined Media Group.
