= Natchitoches Trace =

Prehistoric American Indian path

The Natchitoches Trace was a prehistoric American Indian path that led from the mouth of the Missouri River to present-day Natchitoches, Louisiana. Natchitoches Trace was superseded by the Southwest Trail in historical times.

== History ==
The Natchitoches Trace was a trade route between the Missouri River basin to the Red River basin. From Natchitoches, another American Indian path led to Tenochtitlan, capital of the Aztec empire, site of present-day Mexico City. The site of future Natchitoches, Louisiana was key trading point, and became the first permanent settlement in the Louisiana Purchase territory.

The trade route was named for the Natchitoches branch of the Caddo confederation. As late as the early 1800s, Natchitoches people still lived in the Hot Springs, Arkansas region, and probably visited the springs that today are part of Hot Springs National Park.

Early European explorers followed Natchitoches Trace in the future territories of Missouri and Arkansas. Much of the prehistoric path was adopted by the Southwest Trail when American pioneers later traveled to Arkansas and Texas. The paths varied the most south of the Arkansas River. The American Indian path traveled to Hot Springs, then followed the Ouachita River southward to Louisiana, while Southwest Trail users generally were headed to Texas.

== Route ==
From the mouth of the Missouri River, Natchitoches Trace passed through Wayne County, Missouri. The Indian trace was the southern route of two followed by Cherokees and their enslaved Africans during the Trail of Tears.

In Arkansas, it followed much of the Black River to its mouth on the White River, site of present-day Jacksonport. From Hot Springs, roughly midway on the footpath, Natchitoches Trace followed the Ouachita River downstream. The Ouachita, part of the Red River basin, flows southward to Louisiana's Black River, then to the Red River and Natchitoches, Louisiana.

== See also ==
- Little Missouri River Bridge
