= KPOC-FM =

- Pocahontas, Arkansas; United States
- Frequency: 104.1 MHz
- Branding: Lite 104.1

Programming
- Format: Adult Contemporary

Ownership
- Owner: Combined Media Group
- Sister stations: KPOC

History
- First air date: 1969 (at 103.9)
- Former frequencies: 103.9 MHz (1969–2004)

Technical information
- Licensing authority: FCC
- Facility ID: 59407
- Class: A
- ERP: 6,000 watts
- HAAT: 44 meters (144 ft)
- Transmitter coordinates: 36°16′37.4″N 90°57′16.6″W

Links
- Public license information: Public file; LMS

KPOC-FM (104.1 FM, "Lite 104.1") is a radio station broadcasting an Adult Contemporary music format. Licensed to Pocahontas, Arkansas, United States. The station is currently owned by Combined Media Group.
