= Ravenden, Arkansas =

- Town
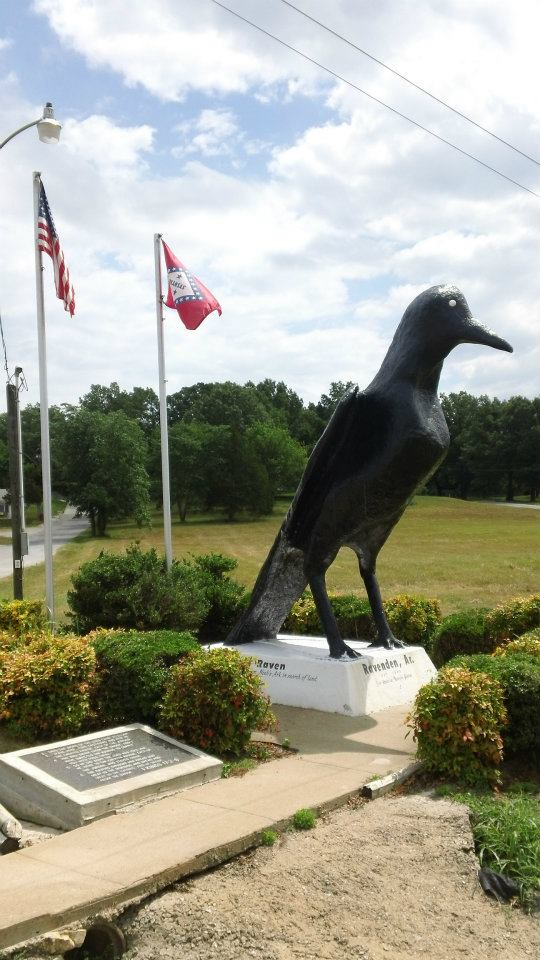
- Raven statue in the town, June 2012

- Location in Lawrence County, Arkansas
- Coordinates: 36°14′2″N 91°15′7″W
- Country: United States
- State: Arkansas
- County: Lawrence

Area
  - Total: 2.12 sq mi (5.49 km^{2})
  - Land: 2.11 sq mi (5.47 km^{2})
  - Water: 0.012 sq mi (0.03 km^{2})
- Elevation: 338 ft (103 m)

Population (2020)
  - Total: 426
  - Estimate (2025): 415 ▼
  - Density: 201.8/sq mi (77.93/km^{2})
- Time zone: UTC−06:00 (Central (CST))
  - Summer (DST): UTC−05:00 (CDT)
- ZIP Code: 72459
- Area code: 870
- FIPS code: 05-58250
- GNIS feature ID: 0058465

Ravenden is a town in Lawrence County, Arkansas, United States. As of the 2020 census, Ravenden had a population of 426. The town is in the valley of the Spring River along U.S. Highway 63 and the Burlington-Northern Railroad.

== History ==
The area was first explored by French settlers in the late 18th century, but did not see any major economic development until 1883, when the Kansas City, Fort Scott and Memphis Railroad built their main line through the area. A post office was established in 1891, and the town formally incorporated ten years later.

The community building, still in use, was dedicated in 1960. Ray Ellis was mayor at that time.

Return to the Land (RTTL), an ethnically exclusive (Identitarian) organization seeking to build segregated communities solely open to those of European descent, owns 160 acres near Ravenden as part of its flagship development. As of July 2025, the community is home to 40 inhabitants.

== Geography ==
Ravenden is located in the northwest corner of Lawrence County at 36°14′2″N 91°15′7″W (36.233972, -91.251911). U.S. Highways 62, 63, and 412 run concurrently through the north side of the town, leading northwest 16 miles (26 km) to Hardy and southeast 5 miles (8 km) to Imboden. Arkansas Highway 90 leads north from Ravenden 6 miles (10 km) to Ravenden Springs.

According to the United States Census Bureau, the town of Ravenden has a total area of 2.1 square miles (5.5 km^{2}), of which 0.01 square miles (0.03 km^{2}), or 0.58%, are water. The Spring River, a southeast-flowing tributary of the Black River, flows through the southern part of the town.

== Demographics ==
Historical population
| Census | Pop. | Note | %± |
|---|---|---|---|
| 1940 | 240 | | — |
| 1950 | 245 | | 2.1% |
| 1960 | 231 | | −5.7% |
| 1970 | 219 | | −5.2% |
| 1980 | 338 | | 54.3% |
| 1990 | 330 | | −2.4% |
| 2000 | 511 | | 54.8% |
| 2010 | 470 | | −8.0% |
| 2020 | 426 | | −9.4% |
| 2025 (est.) | 415 | ▼ | −2.6% |
U.S. Decennial Census

=== 2020 census ===
Ravenden town, Arkansas – Racial and ethnic composition Note: the US Census treats Hispanic/Latino as an ethnic category. This table excludes Latinos from the racial categories and assigns them to a separate category. Hispanics/Latinos may be of any race.
| Race / Ethnicity (NH = Non-Hispanic) | Pop 2000 | Pop 2010 | Pop 2020 | % 2000 | % 2010 | % 2020 |
|---|---|---|---|---|---|---|
| White alone (NH) | 494 | 462 | 412 | 96.67% | 98.30% | 96.71% |
| Black or African American alone (NH) | 0 | 0 | 2 | 0.00% | 0.00% | 0.47% |
| Native American or Alaska Native alone (NH) | 9 | 1 | 0 | 1.76% | 0.21% | 0.00% |
| Asian alone (NH) | 0 | 0 | 0 | 0.00% | 0.00% | 0.00% |
| Native Hawaiian or Pacific Islander alone (NH) | 0 | 0 | 0 | 0.00% | 0.00% | 0.00% |
| Other race alone (NH) | 0 | 0 | 0 | 0.00% | 0.00% | 0.00% |
| Mixed race or Multiracial (NH) | 1 | 3 | 8 | 0.20% | 0.64% | 1.88% |
| Hispanic or Latino (any race) | 7 | 4 | 4 | 1.37% | 0.85% | 0.94% |
| Total | 511 | 470 | 426 | 100.00% | 100.00% | 100.00% |

=== 2000 census ===
As of the census of 2000, there were 511 people, 209 households, and 145 families residing in the town. The population density was 246.7 inhabitants per square mile (95.3/km^{2}). There were 254 housing units at an average density of 122.6 per square mile (47.3/km^{2}). The racial makeup of the town was 97.26% White, 1.76% Native American, 0.59% from other races, and 0.39% from two or more races. 1.37% of the population were Hispanic or Latino of any race.

There were 209 households, out of which 34.9% had children under the age of 18 living with them, 53.6% were married couples living together, 12.9% had a female householder with no husband present, and 30.6% were non-families. 26.8% of all households were made up of individuals, and 9.6% had someone living alone who was 65 years of age or older. The average household size was 2.44 and the average family size was 2.97.

In the town, the population was spread out, with 27.6% under the age of 18, 8.8% from 18 to 24, 24.9% from 25 to 44, 23.1% from 45 to 64, and 15.7% who were 65 years of age or older. The median age was 37 years. For every 100 females, there were 97.3 males. For every 100 females age 18 and over, there were 93.7 males.

The median income for a household in the town was $25,625, and the median income for a family was $29,896. Males had a median income of $23,281 versus $14,444 for females. The per capita income for the town was $10,723. About 19.5% of families and 28.4% of the population were below the poverty line, including 48.6% of those under age 18 and 15.1% of those age 65 or over.

== Education ==
Residents are zoned to the Sloan-Hendrix School District which operates Sloan-Hendrix High School.
