= Maynard High School (Arkansas) =

Location
- 74 Campus Drive; Maynard, Arkansas 72444; United States; 36°25′5″N 90°53′54″W

Information
- School type: Public comprehensive
- Motto: Going the extra mile in educating all students.
- Status: Open
- School district: Maynard School District
- NCES District ID: 0509570
- CEEB code: 041600
- NCES School ID: 050957000700
- Grades: 7–12
- Enrollment: 251 (2023–2024)
- Student to teacher ratio: 3.61
- Education system: ADE Smart Core
- Classes offered: Regular, Advanced Placement (AP)
- Colors: Black and gold
- Athletics: Cross country, basketball, baseball, softball, track
- Athletics conference: 1A 3 East (2012–14)
- Mascot: Tiger
- Team name: Maynard Tigers
- Accreditation: ADE
- Website: www.maynard.nesc.k12.ar.us/o/msd/page/high-school

Maynard High School is a comprehensive public high school located in Maynard, Arkansas, United States. The school provides secondary education for students in grades 7 through 12. It is one of two public high schools in Randolph County, Arkansas and the sole high school administered by the Maynard School District.

== Curriculum ==
The assumed course of study follows the Smart Core curriculum developed by the Arkansas Department of Education (ADE), which requires students complete 22 units prior to graduation. Students complete regular coursework and exams and may take Advanced Placement (AP) courses and exam with the opportunity to receive college credit. In addition, MHS has a concurrent credit agreement with Black River Technical College (BRTC) for students taking selected instructor-led and online courses. The school is accredited by the ADE.

== Extracurricular activities ==
The Maynard High School mascot is the Tiger with black and gold serving as the school colors.

=== Athletics ===
The Maynard Tigers compete in interscholastic activities within the 1A Classification—the state's smallest classification—via the 1A 3 East Conference administered by the Arkansas Activities Association. The Tigers field teams in football, golf (boys/girls), volleyball, tennis (boys/girls), basketball (boys/girls), track and field (boys/girls), baseball, softball, competitive cheer and dance.
