= Arkansas Highway 115 =

Highway in Arkansas

Highway 115

Route information
- Maintained by ArDOT
- Length: 49.926 mi (80.348 km)
- Existed: April 1, 1926–present

Major junctions
- South end: US 167 / AR 58 in Cave City
- US 62 / US 63 / US 412 / AR 166 in Imboden; Future I-57 / US 67 / AR 90 in Pocahontas
- North end: Route 21 at the Missouri state line near Maynard

Location
- Country: United States
- State: Arkansas
- Counties: Sharp, Lawrence, Randolph

Highway system
- Arkansas Highway System; Interstate; US; State; Business; Spurs; Suffixed; Scenic; Heritage
← AR 114	→ AR 116

Highway 115 (AR 115, Ark. 115, and Hwy. 115) is a state highway in Northeast Arkansas. The route begins at US Highway 167 and Highway 58 in Cave City and runs northeast to Missouri Route 21 near Doniphan, Missouri, including a 14 miles (23 km) concurrency with US 62/US 412 between Imboden and Pocahontas. The highway is maintained by the Arkansas Department of Transportation (ARDOT).

One of the original 1926 Arkansas state highways, modern-day Highway 115 was established as State Road 79 between Cave City and Missouri, largely along its modern alignment. The alignment was rerouted between Imboden to Smithville in 1928, and an overlap was created between Pocahontas and Imboden when US 62 was designated across the state in 1931. It was renumbered to Highway 115 to avoid duplication with US 79 in 1935.

== Route description ==
Highway 115 begins at US 167/AR 58 (Main Street) in the small town of Cave City. The highway runs eastward in a concurrency with Highway 58 through the sparsely populated forest and pastures of the Central Plateau subregion of the Ozark Highlands. Highway 58 turns left, ending the concurrency at the unincorporated community of Emery, with Highway 115 continuing east through rural areas and unincorporated communities Ben-Gay and Calamine to enter Lawrence County.

Entering the western side of the county, Highway 115 has an intersection with Highway 117 north of Jessup. The two routes form an overlap northward, crossing the Strawberry River and entering the small town of Smithville. The two routes turn eastward, passing the Smithville Public School Building, listed on the National Register of Historic Places. Highway 115 turns left in Smithville, ending the overlap and heading northward toward Imboden, passing a rural area populated with homes and small farms. Upon entering Imboden, Highway 115 curves northward around the Sloan-Hendrix School District campus and Imboden City Park before an intersection with US 62/US 63/US 412. Highway 115 overlaps with US 62 eastward to Pocahontas.

In Pocahontas, Highway 115 turns left from US 62 to follow Highway 90 through downtown. Highway 115 splits from Highway 90 as Mansker Drive and runs north of the city to an intersection with Highway 251. It continues northeast as a rural highway, passing the NRHP-listed Cedar Grove School No. 81 and forming a concurrency with Highway 166 at Stokes before entering the small town of Maynard. A junction with Highway 328 in Maynard also ends the Highway 166 concurrency. Highway 115 continues north through a rural area, passing the unincorporated community of Middlebrook before crossing the Missouri state line, where it continues as Missouri Route 21.

The ARDOT maintains Highway 115 like all other parts of the state highway system. As a part of these responsibilities, the department tracks the volume of traffic using its roads in surveys using a metric called average annual daily traffic (AADT). ARDOT estimates the traffic level for a segment of roadway for any average day of the year in these surveys. As of 2018, the peak AADT on the highway was 5,000 vehicles per day (VPD) near Pocahontas, dropping to 800 VPD near the Missouri border. The AADT was under 2000 between Cave City and Imboden.

No segment of Highway 115 has been listed as part of the National Highway System, a network of roads important to the nation's economy, defense, and mobility.

== History ==
Historic shields for the route

During the 1926 Arkansas state highway numbering, a route similar to the present alignment of Highway 115 was created between Cave City and Missouri as State Road 79. By September 1928, State Road 79 was rerouted between Imboden and Smithville along a more direct route, with the former alignment becoming Highway 117. When US 62 was designated across Arkansas in 1931, it replaced State Road 79 between Imboden and Pocahontas. When US 79 was designated across Arkansas in 1935, the State Road 79 designation was changed to State Road 115 to avoid duplication. State Road 115, which had been an original state highway between El Dorado and Thornton in South Arkansas, was supplanted by US 167, which had been relocated as part of the US 79 designation. (Note: State Road 79 in Northeast Arkansas is crossed out with "115" handwritten nearby on this undated map from 1935. It is printed as 115 on the 1936 map.)

== Major intersections ==
County	Location	mi	km	Destinations	Notes
Sharp	Cave City	0.00	0.00	US 167 / AR 58 – Batesville, Ash Flat	Southern terminus, Begin AR 58 overlap
Sharp	Emery	0.00	0.00	AR 58 – Poughkeepsie	End AR 58 overlap
Lawrence		14.96	24.08	AR 117 south – Strawberry	Begin AR 117 overlap
Lawrence		15.77	25.38	Bridge over the Strawberry River	
Lawrence	Smithville	19.85	31.95	AR 117 north – Black Rock	End AR 117 overlap
Lawrence	Imboden	31.822	51.213	US 62 west / US 63 north / US 412 west – Hardy, Pocahontas, Hoxie	Begin US 62/US 63/US 412 overlap
Lawrence	See US 62 and Highway 90				
Randolph	Pocahontas	0.00	0.00	AR 90 west (Thomasville Street)	End AR 90 overlap
Randolph		1.89	3.04	AR 251 north – Attica	AR 251 southern terminus
Randolph	Stokes	6.53	10.51	AR 166 south – Engelberg	Begin AR 166 overlap
Randolph	Maynard	11.48	18.48	AR 328 / AR 166 north – Supply	End AR 166 overlap
Randolph–Ripley county line		18.104	29.136	Arkansas–Missouri state line	
Ripley		0.00	0.00	Route 21 north – Doniphan	Continuation into Missouri
1.000 mi = 1.609 km; 1.000 km = 0.621 mi: Concurrency terminus

== See also ==
- List of state highways in Arkansas
