= Black River Technical College =

Community college in Pocahontas, Arkansas, U.S.

Coordinates: 36°14′23″N 90°57′04″W

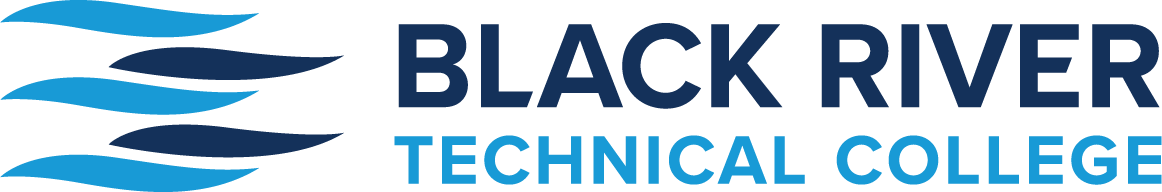
- Other names: BRTC, Black River Tech
- Former name: Black River Vocational Technical School
- Type: Public community college
- Established: 1973
- President: Martin Eggensperger
- Students: 3,000
- Location: Pocahontas, Arkansas, United States
- Campus: rural
- Website: blackrivertech.edu

Black River Technical College (BRTC) is a public community college in Pocahontas, Arkansas. It is named for the Black River which runs through the city. BRTC serves approximately 3,000 students annually through its degree programs, technical courses, and community educational offerings.

== History ==
BRTC was established in 1972 as Black River Vocational Technical School on land donated by the City of Pocahontas, Arkansas. BRTC's original purpose was to provide vocational education for the Northeast Arkansas region. The college adopted its current name in 1991 and became an independent institution of higher education in 1993 at which time it offered associate degrees and college courses toward core requirements for four-year schools.

== Governance ==
BRTC is governed by a seven-member board of trustees appointed by the governor. Each trustee serves a seven-year term which ends on June 30 of the final year.

== Campus ==
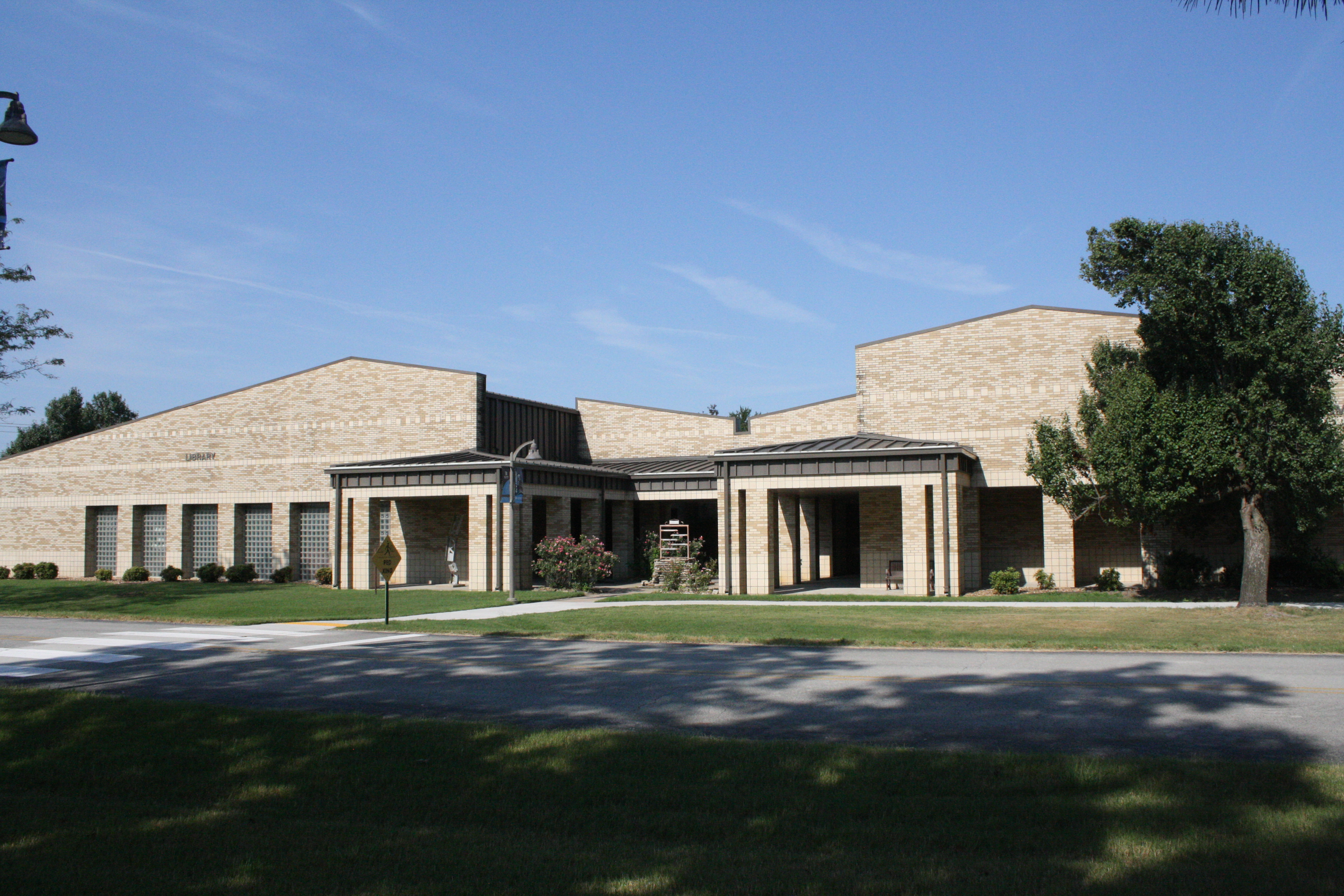
Black River Technical College Library at 1410 Hwy 304 East, Suite 3, Pocahontas, AR 72455

The college's main campus is on Arkansas Highway 304 E in Pocahontas, covering 246,030 square feet (22,857 m^{2}) in 20 buildings over 90 acres (360,000 m^{2}).

BRTC also has one offsite location in Paragould about 40 minutes away from Pocahontas that offers technical and general education credit and workforce training. It is also the location for the Greene County Industrial Training Center.

== Academics ==
BRTC offers the Associate of Arts degree, which can be credited toward the first two years of a four-year degree program. The degree consists of a total of 60/61 hours in required courses and electives (which must be college transfer classes). BRTC also offers the Associate of Science degree and the Associate of Applied Science degree. Additionally, the college offers Technical Certificates, Certificates of Proficiency and adult education courses.

BRTC offers many courses and some full programs through various forms of distance education; the Associate of Applied Science in Registered Nursing courses in nursing theory are done completely by interactive video as part of the Arkansas Rural Nursing Education Consortium (ARNEC), of which BRTC's program is a member.

The BRTC Fire Science program is offered in conjunction with the Arkansas Fire Academy.

BRTC is accredited by the Higher Learning Commission. Its programs have also been approved by the Arkansas Department of Higher Education and the Arkansas State Board of Vocational Education.

The following programs have received additional accreditation or approval as shown below:

Academic Program	Accrediting/Approving Agency
Auto Service Technician	National Automotive Technicians Education Foundation, Inc.
Nutrition and Food Service Management	Association of Nutrition and Foodservice Professionals (ANFP)
Nutrition and Dietetics	Accreditation Council for Education in Nutrition and Dietetics
Nursing Assistant	Arkansas Department of Human Services, Office of Long Term Care
Paramedic	Committee on Accreditation of Educational Programs for the EMS Professions
Practical Nursing	Arkansas State Board of Nursing
Registered Nursing	Arkansas State Board of Nursing
Respiratory Care	Committee on Accreditation for Respiratory Care
Respiratory Care	Commission on Accreditation for Allied Health
