= Maynard, Arkansas =

- Town
- Location of Maynard in Randolph County, Arkansas.
- Coordinates: 36°25′17″N 90°54′07″W
- Country: United States
- State: Arkansas
- County: Randolph

Government
  - Mayor: Gary Hart

Area
  - Total: 1.17 sq mi (3.03 km^{2})
  - Land: 1.17 sq mi (3.03 km^{2})
  - Water: 0 sq mi (0.00 km^{2})
- Elevation: 433 ft (132 m)

Population (2020)
  - Total: 379
  - Estimate (2025): 370 ▼
  - Density: 323.7/sq mi (124.97/km^{2})
- Time zone: UTC-6 (Central (CST))
  - Summer (DST): UTC-5 (CDT)
- ZIP code: 72444
- Area code: 870
- FIPS code: 05-44780
- GNIS feature ID: 2406114

Maynard is a town in Randolph County, Arkansas, United States. The population was 379 at the 2020 census.

Maynard is home to the Maynard Pioneer Museum and Park. A jail built in 1936 has a door made of wagon wheel rims. The last time it was used was in 1988, when it temporarily housed a man charged with public intoxication. The jail is beside Maynard Community Center.

== History ==
Maynard was settled in the late 19th century. John Maynard, formerly a captain in the Confederate Army, spent some time in Texas before moving to Arkansas in 1872, where he opened a dry goods store, and farmed 900 acres, mostly cotton. Other families and businessmen joined him in the village they called New Prospect. When they applied for a post office in 1885 that name was rejected and the office was named ‘Maynard.’ The town incorporated as Maynard in 1895.

Abbott Institute — later known as Maynard Baptist Academy and Ouachita Baptist Academy — was a boarding school established in 1894. Abbott Institute joined a school network associated with a college now known as Ouachita Baptist University in Arkadelphia.

In 1928, Maynard Baptist Academy was sold to the Maynard School District. Its facilities were then used by the public school. All that remains of the academy today is an arch built by Maynard Baptist Academy's class of 1927, its last class. In 2008, Maynard School Alumni Association restored the arch on the school grounds as a memorial to the academy.

== Geography ==
According to the United States Census Bureau, the town has a total area of 2.9 km^{2} (1.1 sq mi), all land.

=== List of highways ===
- Highway 115
- Highway 166
- Highway 328

== Demographics ==
Historical population
Census	Pop.	Note	%±
1900	358		—
1910	295		−17.6%
1920	210		−28.8%
1930	259		23.3%
1940	266		2.7%
1950	216		−18.8%
1960	201		−6.9%
1970	224		11.4%
1980	381		70.1%
1990	354		−7.1%
2000	381		7.6%
2010	426		11.8%
2020	379		−11.0%
2025 (est.)	370	▼	−2.4%
U.S. Decennial Census

There were 175 households, out of which 25.7% had children under the age of 18 living with them, 49.7% were married couples living together, 10.9% had a female householder with no husband present, and 37.1% were non-families. 33.7% of all households were made up of individuals, and 17.1% had someone living alone who was 65 years of age or older. The average household size was 2.18 and the average family size was 2.78.

In the town, the population was spread out, with 24.1% under the age of 18, 8.7% from 18 to 24, 22.8% from 25 to 44, 22.0% from 45 to 64, and 22.3% who were 65 years of age or older. The median age was 40 years. For every 100 females, there were 87.7 males. For every 100 females age 18 and over, there were 85.3 males.

The median income for a household in the town was $17,206, and the median income for a family was $23,056. Males had a median income of $20,625 versus $15,357 for females. The per capita income for the town was $11,668. About 14.8% of families and 27.0% of the population were below the poverty line, including 38.3% of those under age 18 and 18.3% of those age 65 or over.

== Education ==
Public education for elementary and secondary school students is provided by the Maynard School District, which includes:

- Maynard Elementary School
- Maynard High School

== Notable people ==
Notable individuals who were born in or have lived in Maynard:

- Drew Bowers, a native of Pocahontas, Arkansas attended the Maynard Baptist Academy in the mid-1890s.
- Jonathan Dismang, Arkansas state senator for District 28 in White County; a native of Maynard.
