= Success, Arkansas =

- Town
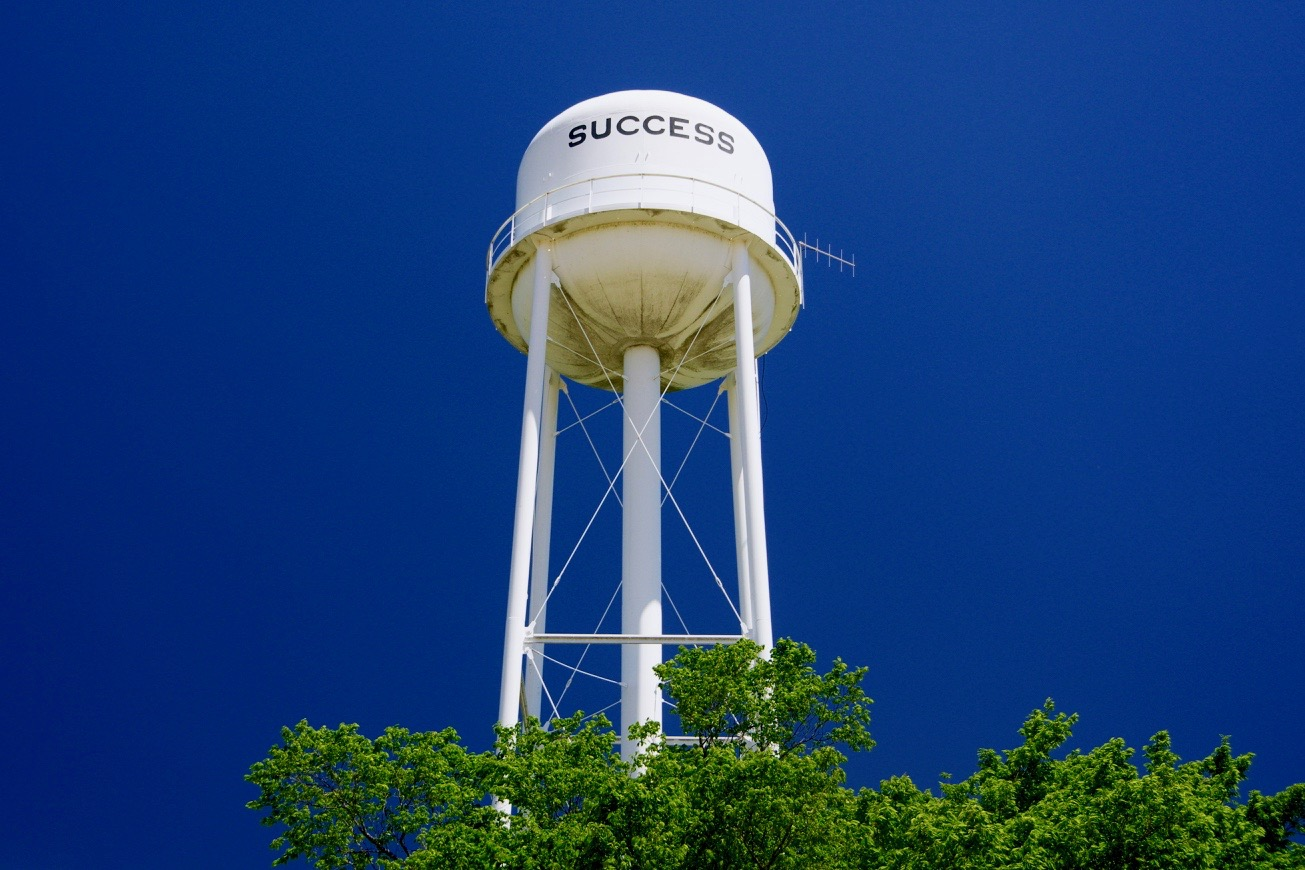
- Water tower

- Location of Success in Clay County, Arkansas.
- Coordinates: 36°27′16″N 90°43′21″W
- Country: United States
- State: Arkansas
- County: Clay
- Established: December 18, 1903

Area
  - Total: 0.22 sq mi (0.58 km^{2})
  - Land: 0.22 sq mi (0.58 km^{2})
  - Water: 0 sq mi (0.00 km^{2})
- Elevation: 295 ft (90 m)

Population (2020)
  - Total: 98
  - Estimate (2025): 96 ▼
  - Density: 438.9/sq mi (169.45/km^{2})
- Time zone: UTC-6 (Central (CST))
  - Summer (DST): UTC-5 (CDT)
- ZIP code: 72470
- Area code: 870
- FIPS code: 05-67550
- GNIS feature ID: 2406678

Success is a town in Clay County, Arkansas, United States. As of the 2020 census, Success had a population of 98.

The origin of the name "Success" is obscure.

== History ==
Success was established during the railroad and timber boom that came to northeastern Arkansas during the late 19th century. The community received a post office with the name “Success” in 1895, and incorporated in 1903.

== Geography ==
Success is located in northwestern Clay County just east of the Little Black River, a tributary of the Current River. The town lies at the intersection of Arkansas Highway 211 and Arkansas Highway 328, northwest of Corning, and 2.7 miles south of the Arkansas-Missouri state line.

According to the United States Census Bureau, the town has a total area of 0.22 square miles (0.56 km^{2}), all land.

== Demographics ==
Historical population
Census	Pop.	Note	%±
1910	379		—
1920	436		15.0%
1930	308		−29.4%
1940	281		−8.8%
1950	311		10.7%
1960	226		−27.3%
1970	201		−11.1%
1980	223		10.9%
1990	170		−23.8%
2000	180		5.9%
2010	149		−17.2%
2020	98		−34.2%
2025 (est.)	96	▼	−2.0%
U.S. Decennial Census

As of the census of 2000, there were 180 people, 71 households, and 49 families residing in the town. The population density was 315.9/km^{2} (824.1/mi^{2}). There were 85 housing units at an average density of 149.2/km^{2} (389.2/mi^{2}). The racial makeup of the town was 98.33% White, 1.11% Native American, and 0.56% from two or more races. 1.11% of the population were Hispanic or Latino of any race.

There were 71 households, out of which 33.8% had children under the age of 18 living with them, 52.1% were married couples living together, 14.1% had a female householder with no husband present, and 29.6% were non-families. 28.2% of all households were made up of individuals, and 23.9% had someone living alone who was 65 years of age or older. The average household size was 2.54 and the average family size was 3.06.

In the town, the population was spread out, with 29.4% under the age of 18, 6.1% from 18 to 24, 26.1% from 25 to 44, 19.4% from 45 to 64, and 18.9% who were 65 years of age or older. The median age was 34 years. For every 100 females, there were 89.5 males. For every 100 females age 18 and over, there were 76.4 males.

The median income for a household in the town was $25,625, and the median income for a family was $30,469. Males had a median income of $19,250 versus $15,938 for females. The per capita income for the town was $30,955. About 19.3% of families and 19.1% of the population were below the poverty line, including 20.0% of those under the age of 18 and 22.5% of those 65 or over.

== Notable person ==
- Joe Jett, state representative for District 56, resides in Success.
