= Delaplaine, Arkansas =

- Town
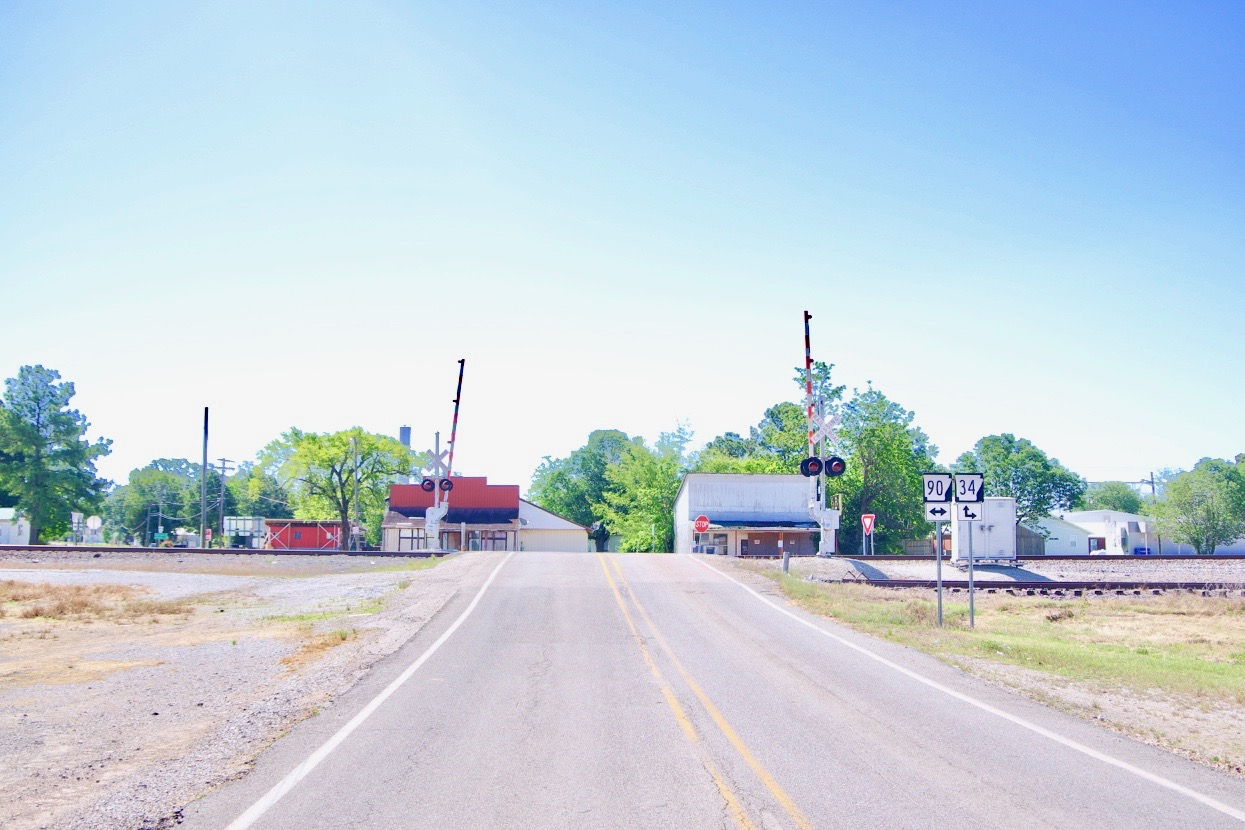
- AR 304 approaching its intersection with AR 34 and AR 90 in Delaplaine

- Location of Delaplaine in Greene County, Arkansas.
- Coordinates: 36°13′49″N 90°43′32″W
- Country: United States
- State: Arkansas
- County: Greene

Area
  - Total: 1.10 sq mi (2.86 km^{2})
  - Land: 1.10 sq mi (2.86 km^{2})
  - Water: 0 sq mi (0.00 km^{2})
- Elevation: 276 ft (84 m)

Population (2020)
  - Total: 64
  - Estimate (2025): 67 ▲
  - Density: 57.9/sq mi (22.34/km^{2})
- Time zone: UTC-6 (Central (CST))
  - Summer (DST): UTC-5 (CDT)
- ZIP code: 72425
- Area code: 870
- FIPS code: 05-18010
- GNIS feature ID: 2406369

Delaplaine is a town in Greene County, Arkansas, United States. The population was 64 at the time of the 2020 census.

== History ==
A French trading post may have operated at the current site of Delaplaine prior to the Louisiana Purchase in 1803. The name is French for "of the plain," and was written as three words (De La Plaine) for many years. When the St. Louis, Iron Mountain and Southern Railway constructed a line through the area in the 1870s, a stop known as "Grey's Station" was established, named for one of the few female postmasters in the state at the time, Lizzie Grey. The town reverted to the name "Delaplaine" in 1875. Delaplaine incorporated in 1912.

== Geography ==
Delaplaine is located in northwestern Greene County at 36°13′58″N 90°43′33″W (36.232701, -90.725807). Arkansas Highway 90 passes through the town, leading northeast, then east, 31 miles (50 km) to Rector, and southwest, then northwest, 21 miles (34 km) to Pocahontas. Arkansas Highway 34 leads southeast from the center of town 16 miles (26 km) to Oak Grove Heights. Paragould, the Greene County seat, is 23 miles (37 km) to the southeast via Highways 34 and 135. Highway 34 joins Highway 90 to the southwest from Delaplaine and leads 17 miles (27 km) to Walnut Ridge. Arkansas Highway 304 leads west from Delaplaine on a more direct route of 16 miles (26 km) to Pocahontas.

Delaplaine is 4 miles (6 km) south of the Black River, and about 2 miles (3.2 km) north of the Cache River.

According to the United States Census Bureau, the town of Delaplaine has a total area of 1.1 square miles (2.9 km^{2}), all land.

== Demographics ==
Historical population
Census	Pop.	Note	%±
1920	152		—
1930	161		5.9%
1940	180		11.8%
1950	208		15.6%
1960	186		−10.6%
1970	145		−22.0%
1980	161		11.0%
1990	146		−9.3%
2000	127		−13.0%
2010	116		−8.7%
2020	64		−44.8%
2025 (est.)	67	▲	4.7%
U.S. Decennial Census; 2014 Estimate

At the time of the 2010 United States census, there were 116 people living in the town. The racial makeup of the town was 97.4% White, 1.7% Hispanic or Latino of any race, and 0.9% from two or more races.

At the time of the 2000 United States census, there were 127 people, 49 households, and 36 families living in the town. The population density was 115.0 inhabitants per square mile (44.4/km^{2}). There were 56 housing units at an average density of 50.7 per square mile (19.6/km^{2}). The racial makeup of the town was 89.76% White, and 10.24% from two or more races.

There were 49 households, out of which 28.6% had children under the age of 18 living with them, 49.0% were married couples living together, 14.3% had a female householder with no husband present, and 26.5% were non-families. 24.5% of all households were made up of individuals, and 8.2% had someone living alone who was 65 years of age or older. The average household size was 2.59 and the average family size was 3.03.

In the town, the population was spread out, with 20.5% under the age of 18, 13.4% from 18 to 24, 26.0% from 25 to 44, 28.3% from 45 to 64, and 11.8% who were 65 years of age or older. The median age was 36 years. For every 100 females, there were 111.7 males. For every 100 females age 18 and over, there were 102.0 males.

The median income for a household in the town was $31,000, and the median income for a family was $27,500. Males had a median income of $27,083 versus $15,625 for females. The per capita income for the town was $13,076. Of the 0.8% of the population living below the poverty line, there were no families, children under the age of 18, nor seniors over the age of 64.

== Education ==
Delaplaine is served by the Greene County Tech School District (GCT district) and its schools in Paragould, Arkansas, including Greene County Tech High School.

For many years, Delaplaine was home to the Delaplaine School District, which included Delaplaine (in the rural northwest of Greene County), O'Kean (in the rural southeast of Randolph County), and the town of Peach Orchard in Clay County. In 2003, the Arkansas Legislature, supported by then-Governor Mike Huckabee, passed Act 60, an act that required every school district in the state that had a daily enrollment of less than 350 students to be consolidated with another school district. As a result, on July 1, 2004, the Delaplaine School District was consolidated with the GCT district. Delaplaine High School and Delaplaine Elementary School initially remained open under the jurisdiction of the GCT district, to serve students in the former Delaplaine district area, however, they were later closed in 2007. Delaplaine mayor Larry Myrick stated that the community lost children with families after the school stopped operations.

== Notable person ==
- Jimmie Lou Fisher, former Arkansas State Treasurer and 2002 Democratic nominee for governor

== Gallery ==
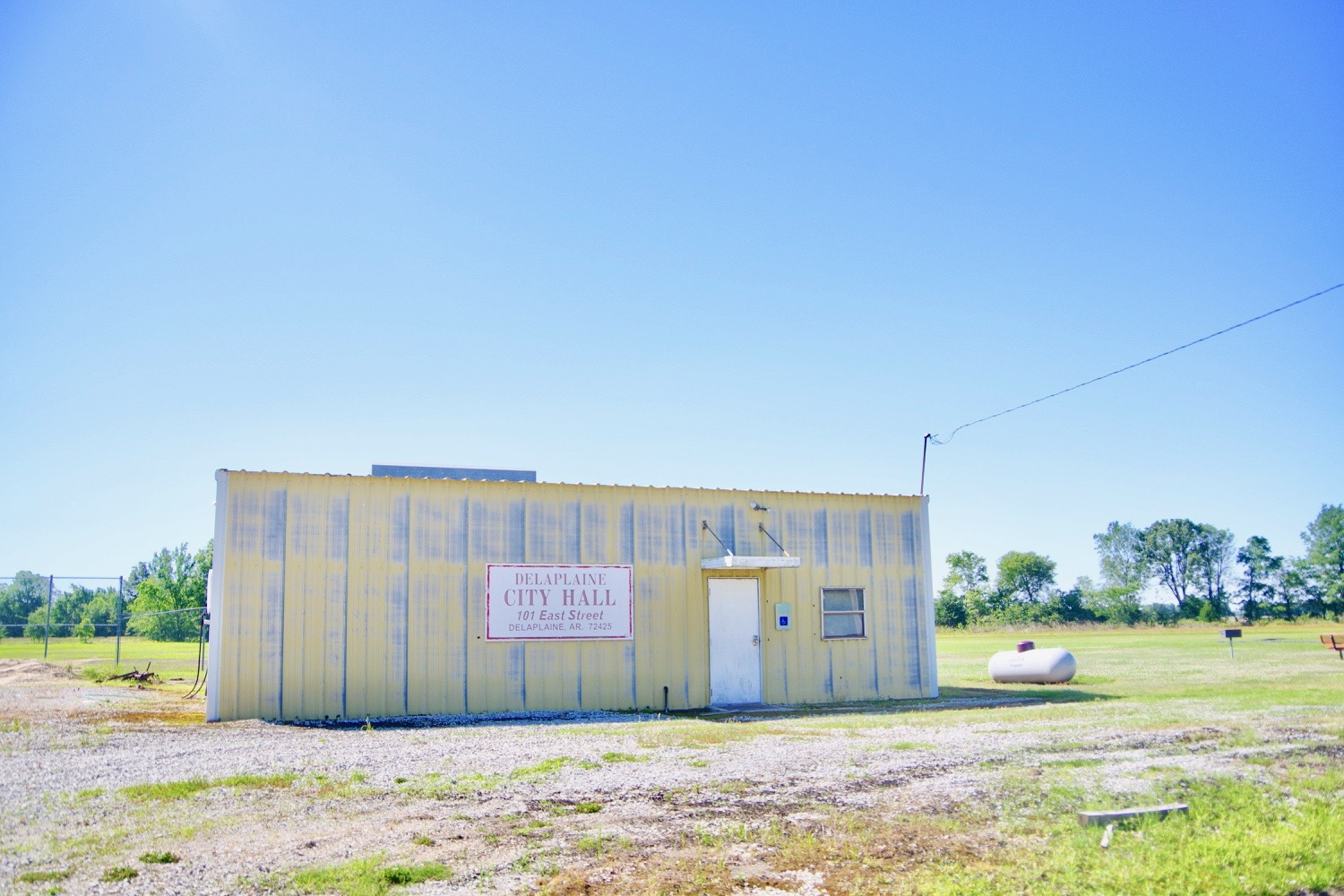
City Hall
