= Pocahontas, Arkansas =

- City
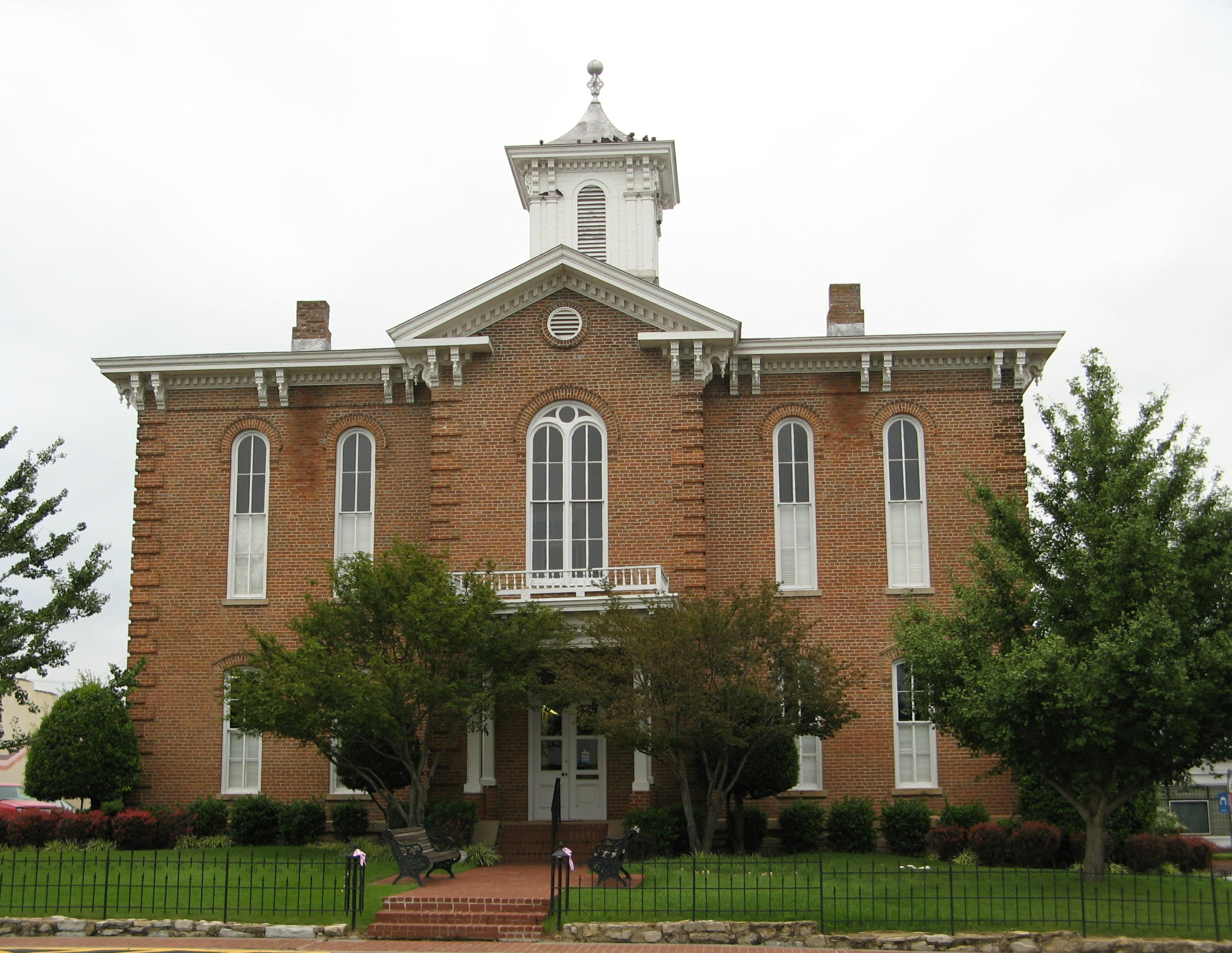
- Old Randolph County Courthouse in downtown Pocahontas

- Seal

- Location of Pocahontas in Randolph County, Arkansas.
- Coordinates: 36°15′49″N 90°58′14″W
- Country: United States
- State: Arkansas
- County: Randolph

Area
  - Total: 7.85 sq mi (20.34 km^{2})
  - Land: 7.64 sq mi (19.78 km^{2})
  - Water: 0.22 sq mi (0.56 km^{2})
- Elevation: 331 ft (101 m)

Population (2020)
  - Total: 7,371
  - Estimate (2025): 7,622 ▲
  - Density: 965.3/sq mi (372.72/km^{2})
- Time zone: UTC-6 (Central (CST))
  - Summer (DST): UTC-5 (CDT)
- ZIP code: 72455
- Area code: 870
- FIPS code: 05-56540
- GNIS feature ID: 2404544
- Website: www.cityofpocahontasar.gov

Pocahontas is a city in and the county seat of Randolph County, Arkansas, United States, along the Black River. As of the 2020 census, Pocahontas had a population of 7,371.

Pocahontas has a number of historic buildings, including the Old Randolph County Courthouse built in 1871, the St. Mary's AME Church, and the Pocahontas Colored School built in 1918, the latter of which is now home to the Eddie Mae Herron Center.

== History ==
This city was named after the Native American from Jamestown, Virginia. A statue of her is located in Overlook Park along the Black River.

The family of Dr. Ransom S. Bettis is given the credit for being the first settlers on the land now called Pocahontas. Dr. Bettis' daughter, Cinderella, married Thomas S. Drew, and lived on 800 acres where the town of Biggers now exists. Bettis and Drew led the founding of Pocahontas as the county seat of Randolph County.

Randolph County is famous for many "firsts"; Arkansas' oldest town, Davidsonville, was established in 1815. The first Arkansas post office was built in Davidsonville in 1817, and the first state courthouse was established in 1818. The earliest land claim was in 1809 near what is now Ravenden Springs. The first actual term of court convened in Arkansas was in 1815 in a part of Lawrence County that was given over to Randolph County. And the country's first overland route, the Natchitoches Trail (Natchitoches Trace), went through parts of Randolph County.

In 1835, the Territorial Legislature granted the formation of Randolph County from part of the area then called Lawrence County. The county was named after John Randolph, who was one of the first settlers in the area.

Randolph County encompasses the rolling hills of the Ozarks to the west and rich, flat farmland of the Mississippi Delta to the east. Five rivers flow through the county, providing access to fishing and canoeing. Soybeans, rice, and other grains are the principal crops in the Delta region, while cattle ranching dominates the hill country. The poultry industry is also a vital part of the area economy.

During the early part of the Civil War, Camp Shaver, located in Pocahontas, was the headquarters for Confederate forces west of the Mississippi River.

The industrial base is diversified, with products such as shoes, large truck trailers, technical components for communications, picture frames, golf bags and luggage, tool boxes, wood products and more.

Pocahontas is the county seat with a population of 6,616. The other 10,407 residents of Randolph County live in rural areas and five incorporated communities – Maynard, Biggers, Reyno, Ravenden Springs and O'Kean.

Local legend holds that Pocahontas was named the county seat through an act of trickery. Supposedly, at the county meeting to determine which city would receive the title, the delegation from Pocahontas brought in large quantities of alcohol and distributed them to the other delegations. When the time came to vote, the only delegation not passed out or otherwise influenced was that from Pocahontas.

== Geography ==
According to the United States Census Bureau, the city has a total area of 7.6 sq mi (20 km^{2}), of which 7.3 sq mi (19 km^{2}) is land and 0.2 square miles (0.52 km^{2}) (2.78%) is water.

== Climate ==
The climate of the city is characterized by relatively high temperatures and evenly distributed precipitation throughout the year. The Köppen climate classification subtype for this climate is "Cfa" (humid subtropical climate).

Climate data for Pocahontas, Arkansas (1991–2020 normals, extremes 1871–present)
Month	Jan	Feb	Mar	Apr	May	Jun	Jul	Aug	Sep	Oct	Nov	Dec	Year
Record high °F (°C)	78 (26)	85 (29)	93 (34)	98 (37)	103 (39)	109 (43)	111 (44)	112 (44)	107 (42)	96 (36)	88 (31)	82 (28)	112 (44)
Mean daily maximum °F (°C)	45.6 (7.6)	50.4 (10.2)	60.1 (15.6)	70.8 (21.6)	78.6 (25.9)	87.0 (30.6)	89.8 (32.1)	88.8 (31.6)	82.7 (28.2)	72.4 (22.4)	58.8 (14.9)	48.5 (9.2)	69.5 (20.8)
Daily mean °F (°C)	35.7 (2.1)	39.8 (4.3)	48.8 (9.3)	58.7 (14.8)	67.5 (19.7)	76.1 (24.5)	79.6 (26.4)	78.2 (25.7)	71.2 (21.8)	59.8 (15.4)	47.7 (8.7)	38.9 (3.8)	58.5 (14.7)
Mean daily minimum °F (°C)	25.8 (−3.4)	29.1 (−1.6)	37.5 (3.1)	46.5 (8.1)	56.4 (13.6)	65.2 (18.4)	69.3 (20.7)	67.6 (19.8)	59.6 (15.3)	47.2 (8.4)	36.5 (2.5)	29.3 (−1.5)	47.5 (8.6)
Record low °F (°C)	−20 (−29)	−22 (−30)	6 (−14)	20 (−7)	31 (−1)	43 (6)	48 (9)	47 (8)	35 (2)	20 (−7)	7 (−14)	−11 (−24)	−22 (−30)
Average precipitation inches (mm)	3.81 (97)	3.94 (100)	4.74 (120)	5.37 (136)	5.38 (137)	3.46 (88)	3.65 (93)	3.90 (99)	3.84 (98)	3.86 (98)	4.85 (123)	4.65 (118)	51.45 (1,307)
Average snowfall inches (cm)	2.3 (5.8)	1.9 (4.8)	1.4 (3.6)	0.0 (0.0)	0.0 (0.0)	0.0 (0.0)	0.0 (0.0)	0.0 (0.0)	0.0 (0.0)	0.1 (0.25)	0.2 (0.51)	0.4 (1.0)	6.3 (16)
Average precipitation days (≥ 0.01 in)	8.5	8.1	9.0	9.4	10.2	7.4	8.3	7.0	6.2	7.7	8.3	8.7	98.8
Average snowy days (≥ 0.1 in)	1.0	1.0	0.3	0.0	0.0	0.0	0.0	0.0	0.0	0.0	0.1	0.6	3.0
Source: NOAA

== Demographics ==
Historical population
Census	Pop.	Note	%±
1880	325		—
1890	507		56.0%
1900	967		90.7%
1910	1,547		60.0%
1920	1,806		16.7%
1930	1,896		5.0%
1940	3,028		59.7%
1950	3,840		26.8%
1960	3,665		−4.6%
1970	4,544		24.0%
1980	5,995		31.9%
1990	6,151		2.6%
2000	6,518		6.0%
2010	6,608		1.4%
2020	7,371		11.5%
2025 (est.)	7,622	▲	3.4%
U.S. Decennial Census

=== 2020 census ===
As of the 2020 census, Pocahontas had a population of 7,371. There were 2,849 households and 1,575 families. The median age was 35.9 years. 25.7% of residents were under the age of 18 and 18.9% were 65 years of age or older. For every 100 females there were 90.0 males, and for every 100 females age 18 and over there were 85.1 males age 18 and over.

96.5% of residents lived in urban areas, while 3.5% lived in rural areas.

Of the 2,849 households, 33.3% had children under the age of 18 living in them. Of all households, 39.3% were married-couple households, 17.9% were households with a male householder and no spouse or partner present, and 35.2% were households with a female householder and no spouse or partner present. About 34.2% of all households were made up of individuals, and 16.9% had someone living alone who was 65 years of age or older.

There were 3,177 housing units, of which 10.3% were vacant. The homeowner vacancy rate was 3.1% and the rental vacancy rate was 9.0%.

Pocahontas racial composition
Race	Number	Percentage
White (non-Hispanic)	6,028	81.78%
Black or African American (non-Hispanic)	106	1.44%
Native American	38	0.52%
Asian	50	0.68%
Pacific Islander	570	7.73%
Other/Mixed	326	4.42%
Hispanic or Latino	253	3.43%

=== 2000 census ===
As of the census of 2000, 6,518 people, 2,693 households, and 1,742 families resided in the city. The population density was 886.6 inhabitants per square mile (342.3/km^{2}). The 2,924 housing units averaged a density of 397.7 per square mile (153.6/km^{2}). The racial makeup of the city was 97.27% Caucasian, 1.10% African American, 0.44% Native American, 0.08% Asian, 0.20% from other races, and 0.91% from two or more races, with about 0.89% of the population Hispanic or Latino of any race.

Of the 2,693 households, 30.0% had children under the age of 18 living with them, 48.0% were married couples living together, 13.1% had a female householder with no husband present, and 35.3% were not families. Around 31.9% of all households were made up of individuals, and 17.3% had someone living alone who was 65 years of age or older. The average household size was 2.32 and the average family size was 2.94.

In the city, the population was distributed as 23.7% under the age of 18, 9.7% from 18 to 24, 25.5% from 25 to 44, 20.1% from 45 to 64, and 21.0% who were 65 years of age or older. The median age was 38 years. For every 100 females, there were 84.6 males. For every 100 females age 18 and over, there were 78.5 males.

The median income for a household in the city was $24,450, and for a family was $29,525. Males had a median income of $26,382 versus $18,750 for females. The per capita income for the city was $15,529. About 15.6% of families and 18.8% of the population were below the poverty line, including 24.9% of those under age 18 and 16.5% of those age 65 or over.

== Education ==
Pocahontas is home to the Pocahontas School District. Public schools include Alma Spikes Elementary School, M. D. Williams Intermediate School, Pocahontas Junior High School, and Pocahontas High School. Pocahontas' school mascot is the Redskins. Pocahontas is also home to St. Paul Elementary School, a private Catholic school serving pre-kindergarten through sixth grade. St. Paul's mascot is the Sabers.

Pocahontas is the home of Black River Technical College.

== Media ==
Newspapers

The Pocahontas Star Herald is published weekly, on Thursdays. It began publication in 1880, and is owned by Corning Publishing.

Radio stations

Pocahontas is home to KPOC/KRLW/KIYS radio stations. The stations' "better known names" are: KPOC-FM is better known as Lite 104.1 FM; KPOC is News Sports Talk 1420 AM; KIYS is Country 106.3 FM; and KRLW is Oldies 1320 AM. While the KRLW and KIYS radio stations are broadcast centrally to the Walnut Ridge/Hoxie area (a community some 15 miles away), the broadcasting site and main offices are centered with KPOC inside Pocahontas. The stations are operated by Combined Media Group Inc.

== Infrastructure ==
=== Highways ===
- US 62
- US 67
- Highway 90
- Highway 115
- Highway 166
- Highway 251
- Highway 304

=== Medical care ===
- St. Bernards Five Rivers Medical Center
- Pocahontas Medical Clinic

=== Airport ===
- Pocahontas Municipal Airport (M70)

== Notable people ==
- William Herbert Allaire Jr.- U.S. Army general
- Larry P. Arnn, a Pocahontas native, president of Hillsdale College, Hillsdale, Mich.
- Edwin Bethune, a former member of the United States House of Representatives, graduated from Pocahontas High School
- Drew Bowers, Arkansas politician and lawyer, was born near Pocahontas in 1886.
- Linda Collins-Smith, Republican member of the Arkansas Senate and business owner
- Jim Johnston, former composer for World Wrestling Entertainment
- Billy Lee Riley, Pocahontas native and American rockabilly musician, singer
- Wear Schoonover, Pocahontas native, was the first University of Arkansas athlete in any sport named to an All-American team.
- Trey Steimel, member of the Arkansas House of Representatives
- Keith Futrell, mayor of Pocahontas and lifelong public servant.
- Edward Steimel, Born January 20, 1922 in Running Lake, Arkansas. He served as Executive Director of the Public Affairs Research Council of Louisiana from 1951 to 1975; he was President and Director of the Louisiana Association of Business and Industry from 1975 to 1988. He was Director of Development for the LSU College of Engineering from 1988 to 2006. Through his fundraising efforts, LSU gained more than 50 scholarships, 106 professorships and 15 special chairs for the college. He and his wife, Mary were instrumental in co-founding the Cerebral Palsy Center of Baton Rouge; now known as the McMains Children's Developmental Center.
