= National Register of Historic Places listings in Randolph County, Arkansas =

Location of Randolph County in Arkansas

This is a list of the National Register of Historic Places listings in Randolph County, Arkansas.

This is intended to be a complete list of the properties and districts on the National Register of Historic Places in Randolph County, Arkansas, United States. The locations of National Register properties and districts for which the latitude and longitude coordinates are included below, may be seen in a map.

There are 18 properties and districts listed on the National Register in the county. Another two properties were once listed but have been removed.

Contents: Counties in Arkansas
- Arkansas
- Ashley
- Baxter
- Benton
- Boone
- Bradley
- Calhoun
- Carroll
- Chicot
- Clark
- Clay
- Cleburne
- Cleveland
- Columbia
- Conway
- Craighead
- Crawford
- Crittenden
- Cross
- Dallas
- Desha
- Drew
- Faulkner
- Franklin
- Fulton
- Garland
- Grant
- Greene
- Hempstead
- Hot Spring
- Howard
- Independence
- Izard
- Jackson
- Jefferson
- Johnson
- Lafayette
- Lawrence
- Lee
- Lincoln
- Little River
- Logan
- Lonoke
- Madison
- Marion
- Miller
- Mississippi
- Monroe
- Montgomery
- Nevada
- Newton
- Ouachita
- Perry
- Phillips
- Pike
- Poinsett
- Polk
- Pope
- Prairie
- Pulaski (Little Rock)
- Randolph
- St. Francis
- Saline
- Scott
- Searcy
- Sebastian
- Sevier
- Sharp
- Stone
- Union
- Van Buren
- Washington
- White
- Woodruff
- Yell

This National Park Service list is complete through NPS recent listings posted September 4, 2026.

== Current listings ==
| | Name on the Register | Image | Date listed | Location | City or town | Description |
|---|---|---|---|---|---|---|
| 1 | Bispham-Brown House | Bispham-Brown House | January 6, 2022 (#100007329) | 705 North Marr St. 36°15′53″N 90°58′06″W | Pocahontas | |
| 2 | Campbell Cemetery | Campbell Cemetery | May 25, 2005 (#05000463) | Off Muddy Ln., southeast of Imboden; 36°10′59″N 91°08′28″W | Imboden | |
| 3 | Cedar Grove School #81 | Cedar Grove School #81 | January 21, 2004 (#03001452) | Approximately 5 miles north of Pocahontas along Highway 115 in the community of Brockett; 36°19′57″N 90°57′06″W | Pocahontas | |
| 4 | Hillyard Cabin | Hillyard Cabin | August 16, 1994 (#94000851) | Western side of Old Burr Rd., northeast of Warm Springs; 36°29′02″N 91°02′04″W | Warm Springs | |
| 5 | Looney-French House | Looney-French House | September 23, 2004 (#04001035) | 1325 Deer Run Trail; 36°23′50″N 91°07′22″W | Dalton | |
| 6 | Marr's Creek Bridge | | January 24, 2008 (#07001433) | S. Bettis St. 36°15′29″N 90°58′19″W | Pocahontas | |
| 7 | Old Davidsonville Historic Site | Old Davidsonville Historic Site | January 18, 1974 (#74000499) | Northeast of Black Rock on the Black River; 36°09′23″N 91°03′23″W | Black Rock | |
| 8 | Old Randolph County Courthouse | Old Randolph County Courthouse | April 24, 1973 (#73000390) | Broadway and Vance St. 36°15′38″N 90°58′10″W | Pocahontas | |
| 9 | Old Union School | Old Union School | November 12, 1993 (#93001203) | 504 Old Union Rd. 36°15′41″N 91°06′07″W | Birdell | |
| 10 | Old US 67, Biggers to Datto | Old US 67, Biggers to Datto | September 24, 2004 (#04001046) | Biggers-Reyno Rd., 1st St., and County Road 111; 36°21′35″N 90°46′37″W | Biggers | Extends into Clay County |
| 11 | Pocahontas Commercial Historic District | Pocahontas Commercial Historic District | June 12, 2009 (#09000315) | Roughly bounded by Rice, Thomasville, Jordan, and McDonald Sts. 36°15′41″N 90°58′14″W | Pocahontas | |
| 12 | Pocahontas Federal Savings and Loan | Pocahontas Federal Savings and Loan | January 24, 2019 (#100003338) | 201 W. Broadway St. 36°15′42″N 90°58′17″W | Pocahontas | |
| 13 | Pocahontas Post Office | Pocahontas Post Office | May 16, 2002 (#02000488) | 109 Van Bibber St. 36°15′43″N 90°58′16″W | Pocahontas | |
| 14 | Randolph County Courthouse | Randolph County Courthouse | August 22, 1996 (#96000910) | Southwestern corner of the junction of Broadway and N. Marr Sts. 36°15′39″N 90°58′16″W | Pocahontas | |
| 15 | Ravenden Springs School | Ravenden Springs School | January 14, 2004 (#03001379) | Highway 90; 36°18′52″N 91°13′26″W | Ravenden Springs | |
| 16 | Rice-Upshaw House | Rice-Upshaw House | October 6, 2004 (#04001107) | Highway 93, 2 miles south of Dalton; 36°25′02″N 91°07′11″W | Dalton | |
| 17 | St. Mary's AME Church-Pocahontas Colored School | St. Mary's AME Church-Pocahontas Colored School | August 5, 2002 (#02000830) | 1708 Archer St. 36°15′44″N 90°58′53″W | Pocahontas | |
| 18 | Yadkin Church | Yadkin Church | May 30, 2019 (#100004003) | Western side of Upper James Creek Rd. approximately 1 mile north of the junction with Lower James Creek Rd. 36°22′45″N 91°14′46″W | Ravenden Springs | |

== Former listings ==
| | Name on the Register | Image | Date listed | Date removed | Location | City or town | Description |
|---|---|---|---|---|---|---|---|
| 1 | Daniel V. Bates House | | December 27, 1979 (#79000457) | September 14, 2002 | U.S. Route 67 | Pocahontas | Destroyed by fire in 1994 |
| 2 | Black River Bridge | Black River Bridge | April 9, 1990 (#90000522) | January 26, 2018 | U.S. Route 67 over the Black River; 36°15′16″N 90°58′15″W | Pocahontas | Swing truss bridge; demolished |

== See also ==
- List of National Historic Landmarks in Arkansas
- National Register of Historic Places listings in Arkansas
