= Randolph County, Arkansas =

County in Arkansas, United States

- County
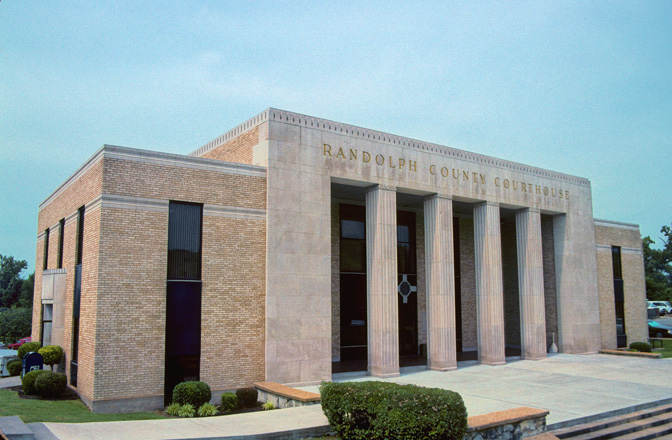
- Randolph County Courthouse in Pocahontas

- Location within the U.S. state of Arkansas
- Coordinates: 36°20′41″N 91°00′46″W
- Country: United States
- State: Arkansas
- Founded: October 29, 1835
- Named for: John Randolph
- Seat: Pocahontas
- Largest city: Pocahontas

Area
  - Total: 656.04 sq mi (1,699.1 km^{2})
  - Land: 651.83 sq mi (1,688.2 km^{2})
  - Water: 4.21 sq mi (10.9 km^{2}) 0.6%

Population (2020)
  - Total: 18,571
  - Estimate (2025): 18,876 ▲
  - Density: 28.491/sq mi (11.000/km^{2})
- Time zone: UTC−6 (Central)
  - Summer (DST): UTC−5 (CDT)
- ZIP Codes: 72413, 72444, 72449, 72455, 72460, 72462, 72478
- Area code: 870, 327
- Congressional district: 1st
- Website: randolphcounty.arkansas.gov

Randolph County is located between the Ozark Mountains and Arkansas Delta in the U.S. state of Arkansas. The county is named for John Randolph, a U.S. senator from Virginia influential in obtaining congressional approval of the Louisiana Purchase, which includes today's Randolph County. Created as Arkansas's 32nd county on October 29, 1835, Randolph County has six incorporated cities, including Pocahontas, the county seat and most populous city, Biggers, Maynard, O'Kean, Ravenden Springs, and Reyno. The county is also the site of numerous unincorporated communities and ghost towns.

== History ==
=== Early History 11,000 BCE - 1836 CE ===
==== Native American History ====
The earliest signs of human civilization in the Randolph County area have been traced to roughly 11,000 BC. Archaeological sites have been discovered that date all the way back to the Dalton Period (10,500 to 9,900 radiocarbon years ago), the most recent and well documented is the Mississippian culture, which lasted from 900 CE to roughly 1600 CE and has several sites and archeological artifacts that have been discovered across the county. Native Americans from tribes such as the Mitchigamea, Osage, Quapaw, Cherokee, Delaware, and Shawnee are believed to all have had a presence in the county with small settlements being established throughout history. Many of these native groups that may have settled the county are believed to have left by 1820 primarily due to the 1811–1812 New Madrid earthquakes.

==== European Exploration 16th-17th Centuries ====
Hernando de Soto, a Spanish conquistador was the first European to explore northeast Arkansas when he crossed the Mississippi River in June of 1541 near the present-day location of Memphis, Tennessee. While his exact route through the area is not known, he is speculated to have explored the Black River and other rivers that flow through Randolph county's present-day location. Several Spanish artifacts dated to the time of De Soto's expedition have also been discovered in Randolph County communities. De Soto would later die in Southeast Arkansas near Lake Village and his expedition left the state in 1543, without any permanent Spanish settlement being established in the Arkansas region.

==== French Rule 1682-1763 ====
The next European explorers to come to the region would be a French Jesuit Missionary, Father Jacques Marquette and Louis Joliet, a French fur trader. The Marquette-Joliet expedition began in 1673 and were tasked with mapping a river route from the Great Lakes to the Gulf of Mexico via the Mississippi River. During the journey, the explorers ventured up parts of the Arkansas, White, and Black Rivers. Marquette discovered a small Mitchigamea settlement near the present-day city of Pocahontas in Randolph County and is thought to have established a small trading post for a short period of time. This voyage paved the way for De Salle in 1682, who claimed the entire Louisiana Territory for France that same year, and De Tonti in 1686 to also explore the area. De Tonti would also be recognized for establishing the Arkansas Post in 1686 near the confluence of the Arkansas and Mississippi River. This would be the first permanent European settlement in Arkansas.

==== Spanish Rule 1763-1800 ====
In 1763, after France lost the Seven-Years war, the empire was forced to cede all of its North American territories to Britain and Spain. All land West of the Mississippi river was given to Spain, while all land east of the river was given to Britain. Much of the Louisiana territory, including Randolph county was now possessed by Spain. During Spanish ownership of the territory from 1763-1800, many French settlers remained in the area and had established trading posts and camps along the white river. Fur traders where a major market at the time and large posts along rivers would be created as a result. One group of French trappers and settlers moved to the Black river, coming from Kaskaskia, Illinois and St. Genevieve, Missouri. These settlers would obtain land grants with the Spanish government and large families like the French Janis family would quickly establish themselves in the region.

==== Louisiana Purchase ====
In 1800 the Spanish quietly gave the Louisiana territory back to France, just for France a few years later sell the entire Louisiana Territory to Thomas Jefferson and the United States in 1803. The Louisiana Territory would eventually be divided up into different sections and later, new states. The Randolph County area would first be included in the new Missouri territory from 1812-1819. The Missouri territory was divided into several counties, the Randolph County area would be a part of the much larger Lawrence County, which at the time comprised many present day counties in northern Arkansas and southern Missouri and has been referred as the "mother of all counties."

==== Missouri Territory 1812-1819 ====
As a part of Lawrence County, the Randolph County area would begin to see white American settlers moving into the region in addition to the French-speaking residents already established there. One notable French settler was Louis (Lewis) DeMun, DeMun, born in the French colony of St. Domingue (colonial Haiti), is known to have worked with the architect of the United States Capital, Benjamin Latrobe and was associated with Vice President Aaron Burr during his term. It was through Burr that DeMun found his way to Lawrence County. Demun obtained a land grant along the Black River around 1814 near present-day Pocahontas. There, he established a saw mill with his two brothers along the Black River named Demun & Co. In 1815, Demun would be credited with establishing Davidsonville by selling all of his land to Lawrence County where the new settlement and first platted city in Arkansas would be created. Davidsonville, named after John Davidson, a Missouri territorial legislator representing Lawrence County, would become an important city along the southwest trail. After its establishment, Davidsonville saw an increase in American settlers coming to the area. Davidsonville became home to the first post office in what is now the state of Arkansas. Prominent French and American families established businesses. There was also a U.S. Land office and a courthouse.

==== Arkansas Territory 1819-1836 ====
By 1819, the Missouri Territory would be split in half at the 36-degree parallel to form the Arkansas Territory, which would become a factor of the Missouri compromise in 1820. This resulted in Lawrence County to now be included in the new Arkansas territory. In 1819 the Arkansas territory was vastly empty besides a couple larger settlements, Davidsonville would be an important trade post and steppingstone to settlers moving into the area, the town would have a population over 400 by 1820. Around 1829 Davidsonville would see a rapid decline, this was in part due to the movement of the southwest trail onto a permanent road in a more convenient location, where a new town named Jackson would be established. The county seat would also be moved to Jackson in 1829, resulting in a quick decline in the towns population. Jackson would also be a short lived settlement, as little is known of the community. Another growing community was Bettis Bluff (now Pocahontas) which developed into the economic seat of the county after the demise of Davidsonville and Jackson. Steamboats arrived in Randolph County in 1829, and the favorable geography of the county, which contained over five rivers, led to an economic surge and the establishment of Randolph County as one of the most important trading centers in the state. The county was broken off from Lawrence county in 1835 and Bettis Bluff, renamed to Pocahontas, became the new county seat. and by 1860 its population had surged from a few hundred in 1815 to nearly 7,000.

=== Civil War and Reconstruction ===
While slavery had never been crucial to the county's economy, nor was there a large slave population (only slightly over 5% of the county), the geographic importance of the county and the presence of Pitman's Ferry made Randolph an early assembly area during the American Civil War. After the Confederate army assembled and moved east, the county was left weakly defended and skirmishes ensued. The Union captured the county in 1862, and it remained in Union hands until the end of the war.

After the war, Randolph County, which had been spared most of the South's devastation and had few economic setbacks due to the limited amount of pre-war slavery, continued to prosper as the St. Louis–San Francisco Railway came to the county. The lumber industry gained importance during this time, and post-war prosperity led to a series of public works projects and the development of a tourist industry centered around the hot springs. A large number of German immigrants came to the county during this time, creating a strong Catholic presence.

=== 20th century to present day ===
Like many rural counties, Randolph County suffered economically during the Great Depression, although the Works Progress Administration was especially effective in the county and produced several public works projects and new highways, which dampened the economic blow. World War II brought mixed results for the county, with hundreds of working men being killed in action or moving to other more high-paying areas even as the introduction of light manufacturing led to a slight economic boom. Randolph County's population eventually rebounded during the late 20th century, although its economic growth remained stagnant after.

Today, Randolph County has a stable population due to its relatively diversified economy, although like many agricultural counties, the overall economic status of the county remains poor. The county remains dominated by public services and light industry, although it has benefited from the growth of the Jonesboro metropolitan area and the local tourist economy.

== Geography ==
Randolph County is located where the foothills of the Ozark Mountains intersect the Arkansas Delta (in Arkansas, usually referred to as "the Delta") in the southeast part of the county. Two of the six primary geographic regions of Arkansas, the Ozarks are a mountainous subdivision of the U.S. Interior Highlands, and the Arkansas Delta is a subregion of the Mississippi Alluvial Plain, which is a flat area consisting of rich, fertile sediment deposits from the Mississippi River between Louisiana and Illinois. The Black River roughly divides the two regions in Randolph County. According to the U.S. Census Bureau, the county has a total area of 656.04 square miles (1,699.1 km^{2}), of which 651.83 square miles (1,688.2 km^{2}) is land and 4.21 square miles (10.9 km^{2}) (0.6%) is water.

The county is located approximately 144 miles (232 km) northeast of Little Rock, 108 miles (174 km) northwest of Memphis, Tennessee, and 204 miles (328 km) southwest of St. Louis, Missouri. (Note: Mileages from Randolph County to Little Rock, Memphis, and St. Louis are based on highway miles using county seat Pocahontas for Randolph County.) Randolph County is surrounded by three Delta counties: Clay County to the east, Greene County to the southeast, Lawrence County to the south, one Ozark county, Sharp County, to the west, and two Missouri counties, Oregon County to the northwest, and Ripley County to the northeast.

=== Hydrology ===
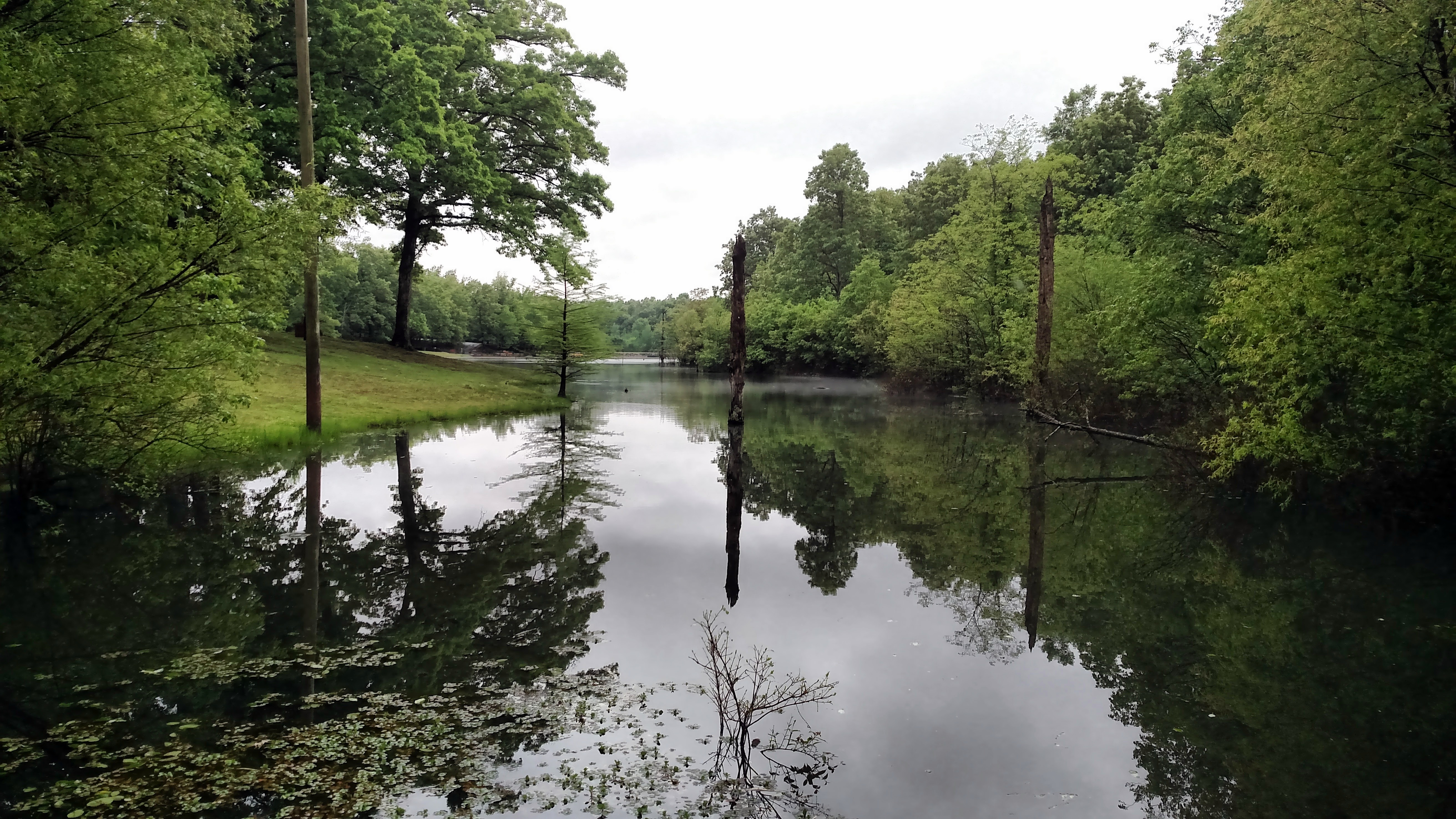
Lake in Davidsonville Historic State Park

Water is an extremely important part of Randolph County's geography, history, economy, and culture. The many rivers, streams, and ditches crossing the county have featured prominently since prehistoric times, and many of the hundreds of archaeological sites are along waterways. Tribes of Lenape, Shawnee, and Cherokee were settled in the area along rivers but left the area following the 1811–12 New Madrid earthquakes.

Randolph County is home to five major rivers: Black River, Current River, Eleven Point River, Fourche River, and Spring River.

Running from east to west toward its own mouth in the southern tip of Randolph County, the Black receives the Current River and Fourche River east of Pocahontas. The Current River serves as the northeastern county boundary with Clay County before turning southwest, passing Reyno and Biggers and meeting the Black east of Pocahontas. The Fourche River enters Randolph County near Doniphan, Missouri and runs south to meet the Black east of Pocahontas. The Black meets the Spring at the southern tip of Randolph County near Black Rock.

The Spring River serves as the county's southwestern boundary with Lawrence County between Davidsonville Historic State Park and Ravenden. The Eleven Point River enters from Missouri near Billmore and runs south to empty into the Spring just west of the state park.

Rivers brought early prosperity to the county during white settlement for navigation. Control of the rivers and Pitman's Ferry led to military action in the county during the Civil War, including a skirmish in 1862. Following the war, natural mineral springs purported to have healing properties attracted visitors to Warm Springs and Ravenden Springs.

=== Protected areas ===
Randolph County contains one state park, Davidsonville Historic State Park, and two Wildlife Management Areas (WMAs), Dave Donaldson/Black River WMA and Robert L. Hankins/Mud Creek Upland WMA, owned by the Arkansas Game and Fish Commission.

Black River WMA preserves bottomland hardwood forest habitat and wintering habitat for migratory birds. Created in 1957, Black River WMA contains over 25,000 acres (10,000 ha) total and extends into Clay and Greene counties. Mud Creek Upland WMA was created in 1989 with 1,250 acres (510 ha) of upland hardwood forest. The area is open to birding, hunting, and hiking.

Davidsonville Historic State Park is a 163-acre (66-hectare) history state park focused on the interpretation and archaeology of the abandoned frontier town of Davidsonville. Once a very important stop on the Black River and Southwest Trail within Arkansaw Territory, Davidsonville was abandoned by 1836 following the decline of river transport and the shifting of the Southwest Trail. The park is owned and operated by the Arkansas Department of Parks and Tourism.

== Demographics ==
Historical population
Census	Pop.	Note	%±
1840	2,196		—
1850	3,275		49.1%
1860	6,261		91.2%
1870	7,466		19.2%
1880	11,724		57.0%
1890	14,485		23.5%
1900	17,156		18.4%
1910	18,987		10.7%
1920	17,713		−6.7%
1930	16,871		−4.8%
1940	18,319		8.6%
1950	15,982		−12.8%
1960	12,520		−21.7%
1970	12,645		1.0%
1980	16,834		33.1%
1990	16,558		−1.6%
2000	18,195		9.9%
2010	17,969		−1.2%
2020	18,571		3.4%
2025 (est.)	18,876	▲	1.6%
U.S. Decennial Census; 1790–1960 1900–1990; 1990–2000 2010–2016

=== 2020 Census ===
As of the 2020 census, the county had a population of 18,571. The median age was 40.9 years. 23.9% of residents were under the age of 18 and 20.1% of residents were 65 years of age or older. For every 100 females there were 97.5 males, and for every 100 females age 18 and over there were 94.0 males age 18 and over.

The racial makeup of the county was 89.8% White, 0.8% Black or African American, 0.5% American Indian and Alaska Native, 0.4% Asian, 3.2% Native Hawaiian and Pacific Islander, 0.7% from some other race, and 4.6% from two or more races. Hispanic or Latino residents of any race comprised 2.1% of the population.

38.6% of residents lived in urban areas, while 61.4% lived in rural areas.

There were 7,322 households in the county, of which 31.0% had children under the age of 18 living in them. Of all households, 49.5% were married-couple households, 17.9% were households with a male householder and no spouse or partner present, and 26.4% were households with a female householder and no spouse or partner present. About 28.6% of all households were made up of individuals and 13.6% had someone living alone who was 65 years of age or older.

There were 8,562 housing units, of which 14.5% were vacant. Among occupied housing units, 69.7% were owner-occupied and 30.3% were renter-occupied. The homeowner vacancy rate was 2.2% and the rental vacancy rate was 9.5%.

=== 2010 Census ===
Racial/Ethnic Makeup of Randolph County treating Hispanics as a Separate Category (2010)
1. White Non-Hispanic (95.9%)
2. Black Non-Hispanic (0.70%)
3. Native American Non-Hispanic (0.50%)
4. Asian Non-Hispanic (0.20%)
5. Pacific Islander Non-Hispanic (0.00%)
6. Other Non-Hispanic (0.00%)
7. Two or more races Non-Hispanic (1.20%)
8. Hispanic Any Race (1.60%)

As of the 2010 census, there were 17,969 people, 7,299 households, and 4,997 families residing in the county. The population density was 27 people per square mile (10 people/km^{2}). There were 8,513 housing units at an average density of 13 units per square mile (5.0 units/km^{2}). The racial makeup of the county was 96.5% White, 0.7% Black or African American, 0.5% Native American, 0.2% Asian, 0.7% from other races, and 1.4% from two or more races. 1.6% of the population were Hispanic or Latino of any race.

There were 7,299 households, out of which 30.5% had children under the age of 18 living with them, 53.1% were married couples living together, 10.7% had a female householder with no husband present, and 31.5% were non-families. 27.7% of all households were made up of individuals, and 14.1% had someone living alone who was 65 years of age or older. The average household size was 2.41 and the average family size was 2.92.

In the county, the population was spread out, with 23.2% under the age of 18, 8.3% from 18 to 24, 22.7% from 25 to 44, 27.1% from 45 to 64, and 18.7% who were 65 years of age or older. The median age was 41.9 years. For every 100 females there were 96.2 males. For every 100 females age 18 and over, there were 92.6 males.

=== 2000 Census ===
As of the 2000 census, there were 18,195 people, 7,265 households, and 5,245 families residing in the county. The population density was 28 people per square mile (11 people/km^{2}). There were 8,268 housing units at an average density of 13 units per square mile (5.0 units/km^{2}). The racial makeup of the county was 96.99% White, 0.97% Black or African American, 0.53% Native American, 0.07% Asian, 0.01% Pacific Islander, 0.27% from other races, and 1.15% from two or more races. 0.82% of the population were Hispanic or Latino of any race.

There were 7,265 households, out of which 30.70% had children under the age of 18 living with them, 58.40% were married couples living together, 9.90% had a female householder with no husband present, and 27.80% were non-families. 24.70% of all households were made up of individuals, and 12.10% had someone living alone who was 65 years of age or older. The average household size was 2.46 and the average family size was 2.93.

In the county, the population was spread out, with 24.60% under the age of 18, 8.30% from 18 to 24, 25.70% from 25 to 44, 24.30% from 45 to 64, and 17.00% who were 65 years of age or older. The median age was 39 years. For every 100 females there were 96.00 males. For every 100 females age 18 and over, there were 90.50 males.

== Economy ==
Top employers
Rank	Employer	Employees
1	Peco Foods	500
2	Pocahontas School District	255
3	Walmart Stores Inc	212
4	Black River Technical College	200
5	St. Bernards Five Rivers Medical Center	180
6	Randolph County Nursing Home	170
7	Pocahontas Aluminum	129
8	Pocahontas Healthcare & Rehab	100
9	Above & Beyond Home Care	79
10	Maclean-Fogg	46

Employment by sector in Randolph County is varied, led by professional services (26.8%), government employees and government enterprises (15.8%), trade (12.8%), agriculture (11.3%), and manufacturing (9.8%). A rural county with several small manufacturers, Randolph County consistently has an unemployment rate above state and national averages. As of October 2015, the Randolph County unemployment rate was 5.9%, down significantly from a peak of 10.3% in 2011 during the height of the Great Recession. For comparison, the unemployment rate was 4.9% statewide and 5.0% in the US in October 2015.

As of the 2000 Census, the median income for a household in the county was $27,583, and the median income for a family was $33,535. Males had a median income of $25,006 versus $18,182 for females. The per capita income for the county was $14,502. About 11.90% of families and 15.30% of the population were below the poverty line, including 18.80% of those under age 18 and 15.20% of those age 65 or over.

=== Public health ===
Randolph County's above-average poverty rate also indicates a high Medicaid eligibility rate. As of 2012, 38.1% of Randolph County was eligible for Medicaid, with 65.1% of children under 19 eligible for ARKids First, a program by the Arkansas Department of Human Services that combines children's Medicaid (ARKids A) and other programs for families with higher incomes (ARKids B). The county's population is significantly above healthy weight, with 71.7% of adults and 41.2% of children/adolescents ranking as overweight or obese, above the state averages of 67.1% and 39.3%, themselves significantly above national averages of 62.9% and 30.3%, respectively.

St. Bernards Five Rivers Medical Center in Pocahontas is a community hospital offering acute inpatient care, emergency care, diagnostics, surgery, rehabilitation, therapy, and senior care services. The facility is rated as a Level 4 Trauma Center by the Arkansas Department of Health. St. Bernards Medical Center in Jonesboro is a referral hospital in the region, focusing on heart care, cancer treatment, women's/children's services, and senior services.

The nearest Level 1 Trauma Centers are Le Bonheur Children's Hospital and Regional Medical Center, both in Memphis.

== Culture and media ==
=== Culture ===
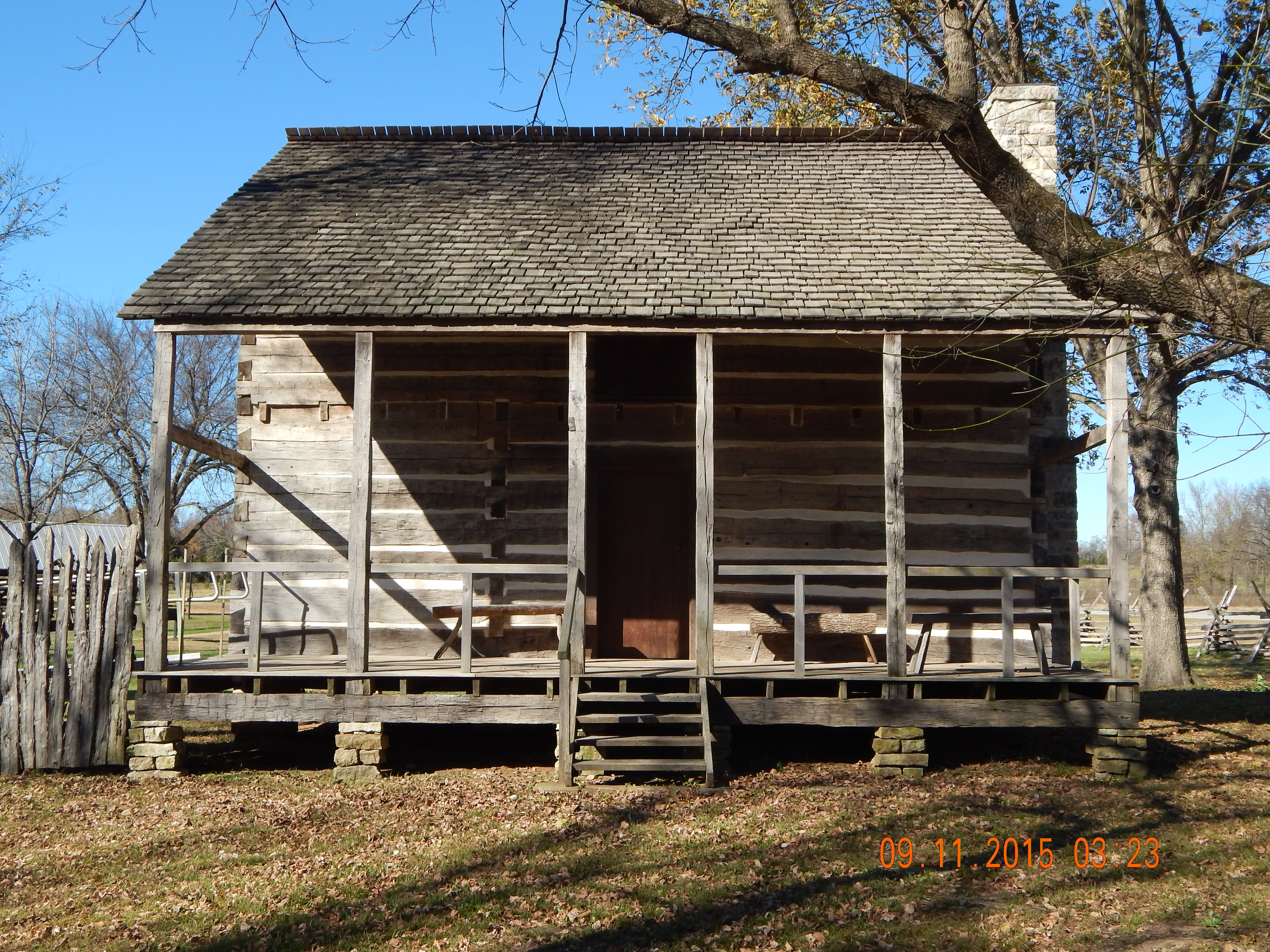
Built c. 1826, the Rice-Upshaw log structure is one of the oldest buildings in Arkansas.

Randolph County has several facilities, monuments, and museums dedicated to preserving the history and culture of the area. Several historic log structures remain in the county from the pioneer era. The Rice-Upshaw House, an 1820s-era log cabin near Dalton, is one of the oldest structures in Arkansas. Randolph County also includes Hillyard Cabin and the Looney-French House, both listed on the National Register of Historic Places.

The county contains several historic schools and community centers, including Cedar Grove School No. 81, a historic one room schoolhouse now used as a community center, the Eddie Mae Herron Center & Museum, a refurbished black school today serving as a community center and interpretative site, Old Union School in Birdell, and Ravenden Springs School.

- Century Wall Monument, celebration of influential twentieth-century Americans
- Davidsonville Historic State Park
- Maynard Pioneer Museum, celebrates the early settlers
- Old Randolph County Courthouse, restored 1875 courthouse in Pocahontas town square today used by Randolph County Chamber of Commerce

Randolph County voters approved sales of alcoholic beverages during a November 2018 election. Prior to the change taking effect in February 2019, Randolph County had been an alcohol prohibition or dry county for some 70 years.

=== Media ===
==== Newspapers ====
- The Pocahontas Star-Herald, published in Pocahontas since 1880, serves as the newspaper of record for the county.

==== Television ====
- KAIT serves as the ABC, NBC, and CW affiliate for Jonesboro and the region.
- KJNB-CD serves as the FOX and CBS affiliate for Jonesboro and the region.
- KTEJ serves as the Arkansas PBS affiliate for Jonesboro and the region.
- KVTJ serves as the Victory Television Network affiliate for Jonesboro and the region.

== Government ==
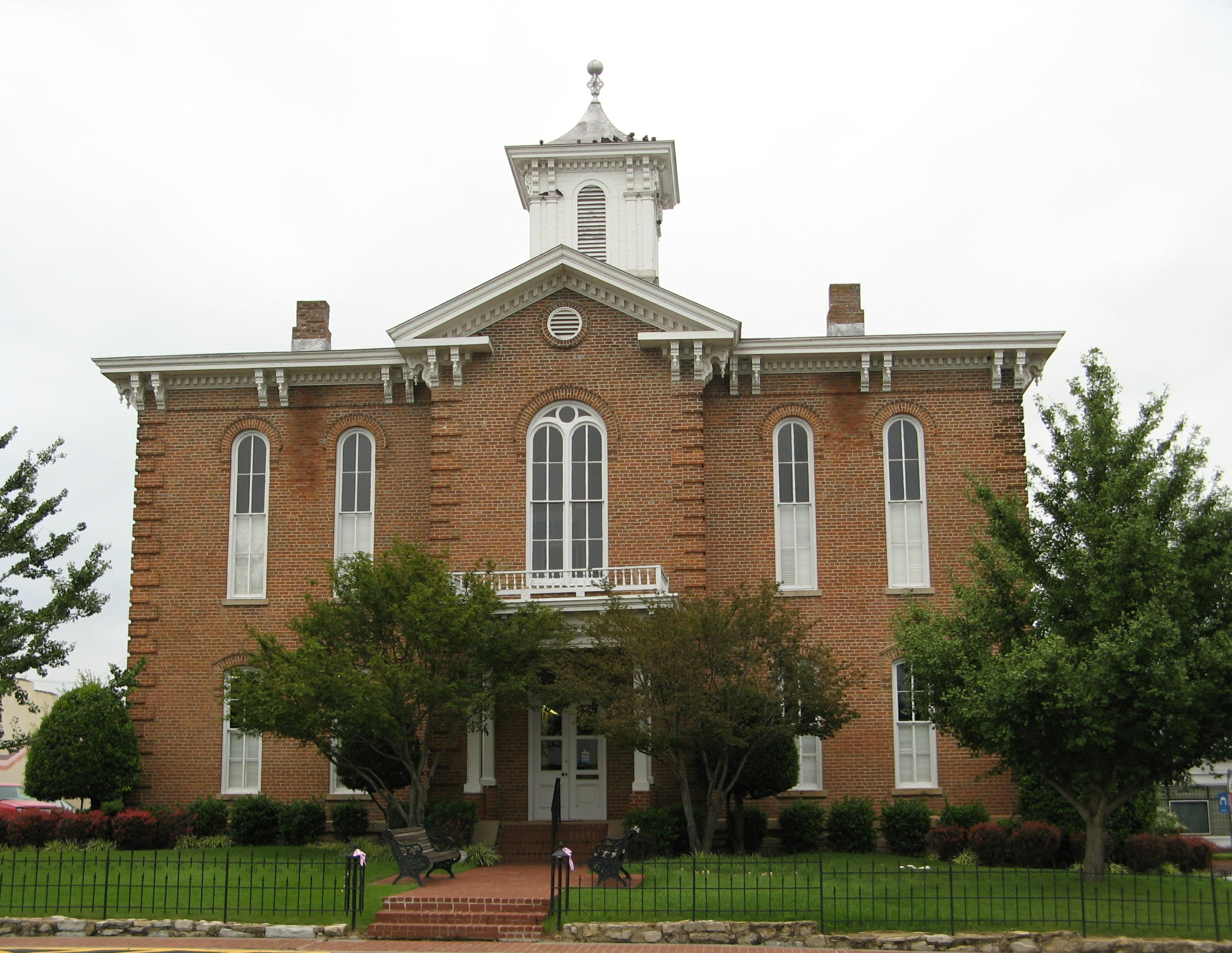
The Old Randolph County Courthouse in Pocahontas was the seat of county government until 1941.

The county government is a constitutional body granted specific powers by the Constitution of Arkansas and the Arkansas Code. The quorum court is the legislative branch of the county government and controls all spending and revenue collection. Representatives are called justices of the peace and are elected from county districts every even-numbered year. The number of districts in a county vary from nine to fifteen, and district boundaries are drawn by the county election commission. The Randolph County Quorum Court has nine members. Presiding over quorum court meetings is the county judge, who serves as the chief operating officer of the county. The county judge is elected at-large and does not vote in quorum court business, although capable of vetoing quorum court decisions.

Randolph County, Arkansas Elected countywide officials

District	Name	Party
County Judge	Ben Wicker	Independent
County Clerk	Rhonda Blevins	Republican
Circuit Clerk	Debbie Wise	Democratic
Sheriff	Kevin Bell	Republican
Treasurer	Dennis Calaway	Republican
Collector	Jennifer Zitzelberger	Republican
Assessor	Krissy Massey	Republican
Coroner	Clyde Hackworth	Unknown

The composition of the Quorum Court is:

District	Name	Party
1	Mistina Hibbard	Republican
2	Jill Thompson Henderson	Democratic
3	Tony Brown	Republican
4	David Blevins	Republican
5	Doris Sharp	Democratic
6	Darrel Nelson	Republican
7	Eric Bass	Republican
8	Roy Causbie	Republican
9	David Statler	Republican

Additionally, the townships of Randolph County are entitled to elect their own respective constables, as set forth by the Constitution of Arkansas. Constables are largely of historical significance as they were used to keep the peace in rural areas when travel was more difficult. The township constables are:

District	Name	Party
Current River	Matt Blevins	Republican
Dalton	Kevin Upshaw	Republican
Ingram	Larry Rogers	Republican
Janes Creek	Tom Dildine	Democratic
Little Black	Joe Grooms	Republican
Richardson	Roudy Patton	Republican
Shiloh	Mark Brown	Republican
Spring River	Brad Doney	Republican
Ward 1	Victor Blevins	Republican
Ward 2	Druderik Adams	Republican
Ward 3	Trason Johnson	Republican
Warm Springs	Steve Bounds	Republican
West Roanoke	Dale Arnold	Republican

=== Politics ===
United States presidential election results for Randolph County, Arkansas
Year	Republican		Democratic		Third party(ies)	
Year	No.	%	No.	%	No.	%
1896	307	13.79%	1,915	86.03%	4	0.18%
1900	428	23.46%	1,385	75.93%	11	0.60%
1904	409	31.75%	838	65.06%	41	3.18%
1908	517	26.98%	1,348	70.35%	51	2.66%
1912	264	16.83%	997	63.54%	308	19.63%
1916	458	22.77%	1,553	77.23%	0	0.00%
1920	652	31.17%	1,412	67.50%	28	1.34%
1924	389	32.20%	772	63.91%	47	3.89%
1928	776	33.58%	1,527	66.08%	8	0.35%
1932	206	9.18%	2,021	90.10%	16	0.71%
1936	414	19.62%	1,693	80.24%	3	0.14%
1940	474	21.75%	1,687	77.42%	18	0.83%
1944	529	25.82%	1,514	73.89%	6	0.29%
1948	377	14.32%	2,139	81.24%	117	4.44%
1952	1,302	40.01%	1,941	59.65%	11	0.34%
1956	1,117	38.61%	1,763	60.94%	13	0.45%
1960	1,620	49.42%	1,556	47.47%	102	3.11%
1964	1,312	32.73%	2,680	66.85%	17	0.42%
1968	1,237	29.35%	1,367	32.44%	1,610	38.21%
1972	2,578	62.83%	1,525	37.17%	0	0.00%
1976	1,571	25.66%	4,551	74.34%	0	0.00%
1980	2,579	43.50%	3,070	51.78%	280	4.72%
1984	3,188	55.61%	2,507	43.73%	38	0.66%
1988	2,560	47.25%	2,781	51.33%	77	1.42%
1992	1,766	27.97%	3,921	62.10%	627	9.93%
1996	1,789	31.76%	3,213	57.04%	631	11.20%
2000	2,673	45.48%	3,019	51.37%	185	3.15%
2004	3,158	47.37%	3,412	51.18%	97	1.45%
2008	3,615	57.21%	2,469	39.07%	235	3.72%
2012	3,701	62.14%	2,046	34.35%	209	3.51%
2016	4,509	70.69%	1,425	22.34%	445	6.98%
2020	5,355	78.61%	1,215	17.84%	242	3.55%
2024	5,367	80.88%	1,138	17.15%	131	1.97%

In the United States Senate, Randolph County is represented by John Boozman and Tom Cotton, both Republicans. In the House of Representatives, Randolph County is within Arkansas's 1st congressional district, represented by Republican Rick Crawford.

In the Arkansas State Senate, Randolph County is split between the 19th District and 20th District. Pocahontas and areas to the southeast are in the 20th along with Clay, Greene, Lawrence and a small portion of Craighead counties. Areas north or west of Pocahontas are in the 19th along with Izard, Sharp, Independence and a small portion of Fulton counties. The 19th is represented by Republican James Sturch since 2019, and the 20th is represented by Republican Blake Johnson. In the Arkansas House of Representatives, Randolph County is split between the 56th District, 60th District, and 61st District. The eastern part of Randolph County is in the 56th District, which also includes Clay and most of Greene counties. Portions of Randolph County generally south and west of Pocahontas are represented by the 60th District, which also includes Lawrence County, most of Izard County, and a small portion of Greene County. The remainder of Randolph County, including Pocahontas, is represented by the 61st District, along with portions of Sharp and Fulton counties. These districts are represented by Republicans Joe Jett, Frances Cavenaugh, and Marsh Davis, respectively.

Judicially, the county is within the 3rd Judicial Circuit Court, which covers Jackson, Lawrence, Randolph, and Sharp counties. The 3rd Circuit contains three circuit judges, elected to six-year terms at-large.

A classic example of a Solid South county, Randolph County was reliably Democratic throughout most of its history. Except for the Catholic John F. Kennedy in 1960 (the county had voted for Catholic Al Smith in 1928, possibly due to concerns over Herbert Hoover's mismanagement of the Great Mississippi Flood of 1927), the county supported every Democratic presidential candidate between 1896 and 2004. Even as the South shifted heavily to the right during the late 20th century, Randolph remained reliably Democratic aside from Republican landslides. It began shifting hard to the right in the 1980s as Democrats slowly moved to the left, but it remained in the Democratic margin until the 2000s due to the liberal policies of George H. W. Bush and the successive presence of favorite sons Bill Clinton and Al Gore (a native Arkansan and a neighboring Tennessean, respectively) on the ballot. It narrowly voted once more for Democrat John Kerry in 2004, but broke for Republicans in 2008 due to the leftward shift of the national Democratic Party. Since then, Republicans have dominated the county, gaining in vote share in every election since 1992. In the 2020s, Democrats have failed to break 20% for the first time in county history, while Republicans broke 80% for the first time in history in 2024.

=== Taxation ===
Property tax is assessed by the Randolph County Assessor annually based upon the fair market value of the property and determining which tax rate, commonly called a millage in Arkansas, will apply. The rate depends upon the property's location with respect to city limits, school district, and special tax increment financing (TIF) districts. This tax is collected by the Randolph County Collector between the first business day of March of each year through October 15 without penalty. The Randolph County Treasurer disburses tax revenues to various government agencies, such as cities, county road departments, fire departments, libraries, and police departments in accordance with the budget set by the quorum court.

Sales and use taxes in Arkansas are voter approved and collected by the Arkansas Department of Finance and Administration. Arkansas's statewide sales and use tax has been 6.5% since July 1, 2013. Randolph County has an additional sales and use tax of 1.25%, which has been in effect since January 1, 1999. Within Randolph County, the City of Pocahontas has an additional 2% sales and use tax since October 1, 2013, and the Town of Maynard an additional 1.5% sales and use tax since April 1, 2012. The Arkansas State Treasurer disburses tax revenue to counties/cities in accordance with tax rules.

== Education ==
=== Education statistics ===
Educational attainment in Randolph County is typical for a rural Arkansas county, with a 2012 study finding 82.5% of Randolph County residents over age 25 held a high school degree or higher and 13.4% holding a bachelor's degree or higher. The Randolph County rates are below Arkansas averages of 84.8% and 21.1%, and significantly below national averages of 86.7% and 29.8%, respectively.

=== Primary and secondary education ===
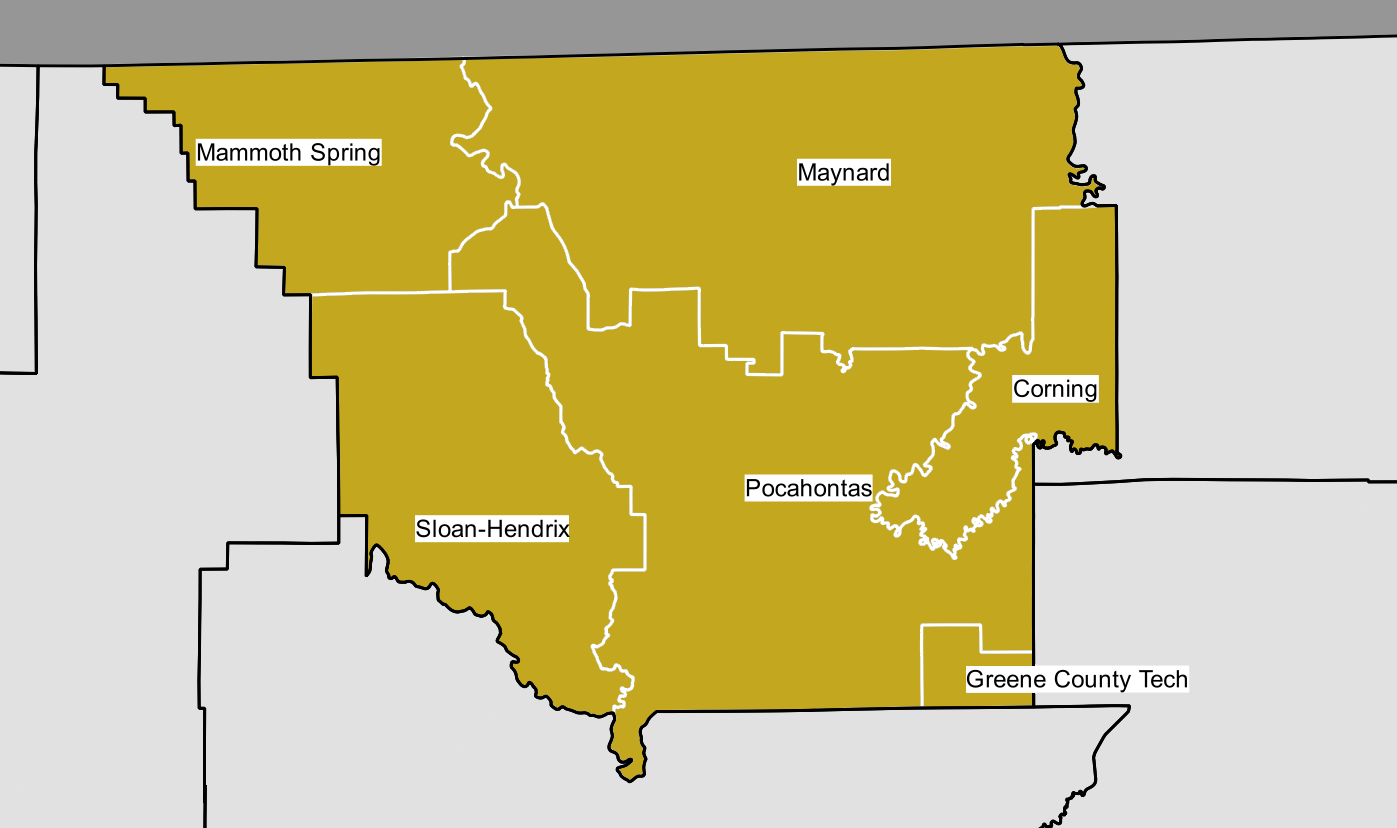
Public school district boundaries in Randolph County as of July 2016

Two public school districts are based in Randolph County; the Pocahontas School District is the largest school district in Randolph County, with the Maynard School District serving the northeast corner of the county. Successful completion of the curriculum of these schools leads to graduation from Pocahontas High School or Maynard High School, respectively. Both high schools offer Advanced Placement (AP) courses, concurrent credit agreements with nearby Black River Technical College (BRTC), and are accredited by the Arkansas Department of Education (ADE). Additionally, Pocahontas HS is accredited by AdvancED.

Residents outside the two Randolph County-based districts are within either the Mammoth Spring School District, Sloan-Hendrix School District, Greene County Tech School District, or Corning School District.

=== Higher education ===
Randolph County contains one institution of higher education, Black River Technical College, a public community college in Pocahontas.

=== Library system ===
The Randolph County Library (RCL) in downtown Pocahontas is a member library of the Northeast Arkansas Regional Library System. RCL offers books, e-books, media, reference, youth, business and genealogy services.

== Transportation and infrastructure ==
=== Aviation ===
Randolph County contains one public owned/public use general aviation airport, Pocahontas Municipal Airport (Nick Wilson Field) in Pocahontas. For the twelve-month period ending August 31, 2014, the facility saw 7,000 general aviation operations. The nearest commercial service airport is Memphis International Airport.

=== Highways ===
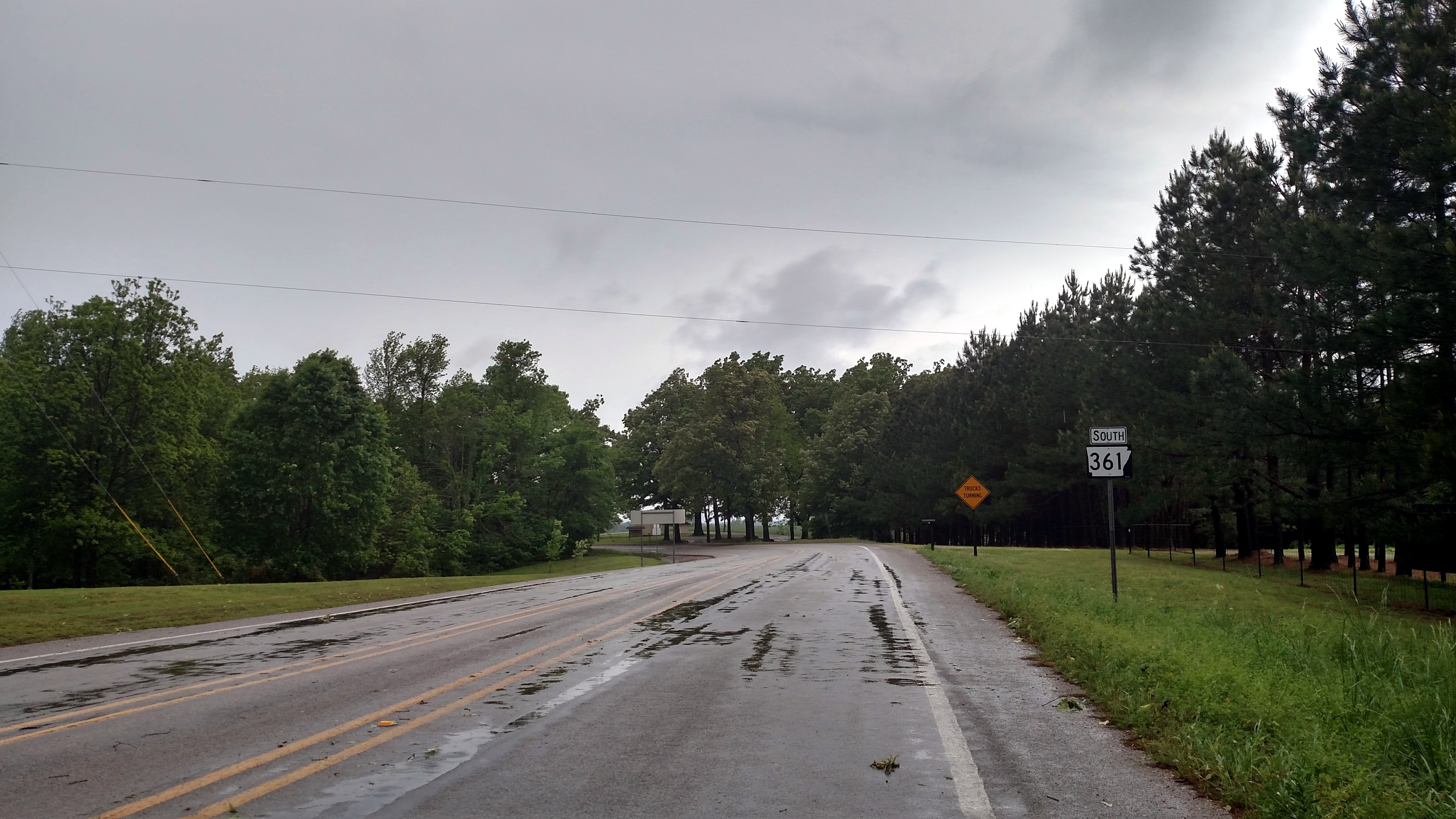
Highway 361 near Davidsonville Historic State Park

- I-57 (future)
- US 62
- US 67
- US 412
- AR 34
- AR 90
- AR 93
- AR 115
- AR 166
- AR 231
- AR 251
- AR 304
- AR 328
- AR 361

=== Utilities ===
The Arkansas Department of Health (ADH) is responsible for the regulation and oversight of public water systems throughout the state. Randolph County contains six community water systems: Biggers Water Department, City of Maynard, O'Kean Water System, Pocahontas Water and Sewer, Ravenden Springs Waterworks, Reyno Water Department, as well as portions of Clay County Regional Water Distribution District (CCRWDD), Northeast Arkansas Public Water Authority (NEAPWA), and Lawrence County Regional Water District. Pocahontas W&S has the largest retail population in the county (7,547), with all others under 500 accounts served. Of the water systems serving Randolph County, only Pocahontas and NEAPWA use surface water (the Black River and Spring River, respectively) for source water; all others use groundwater wells or purchase from neighboring utilities.

== Communities ==
Two incorporated cities and four incorporated towns are located within the county. The largest city and county seat, Pocahontas, is located in the south-central part of the county on the Black River. Pocahontas' population in 2010 was 6,608, and has been increasing since the 1960 Census. The county's small towns all have a population under 500 as of the 2010 Census, with Ravenden Springs the smallest at 118 in western Randolph County. The remaining communities are in the Delta portion of the county: Maynard north of Pocahontas, Biggers and Reyno (the other city) along US 67 near the county's eastern border, and O'Kean in the southeastern corner.

Randolph County has dozens of unincorporated communities and ghost towns within its borders. This is due to early settlers in Arkansas tending to settle in small clusters rather than incorporated towns. For example, communities like Davidsonville had a post office and dozens of buildings at some point in their history. Other communities are simply a few dwellings at a crossroads that have adopted a common place name over time. Some are officially listed as populated places by the United States Geological Survey, and others are listed as historic settlements. Ravenden Springs

=== Cities ===
- Pocahontas (County Seat)
- Reyno

=== Towns ===
- Biggers
- Maynard
- O'Kean
- Ravenden Springs

=== Census-designated place ===
- Warm Springs

=== Unincorporated communities ===
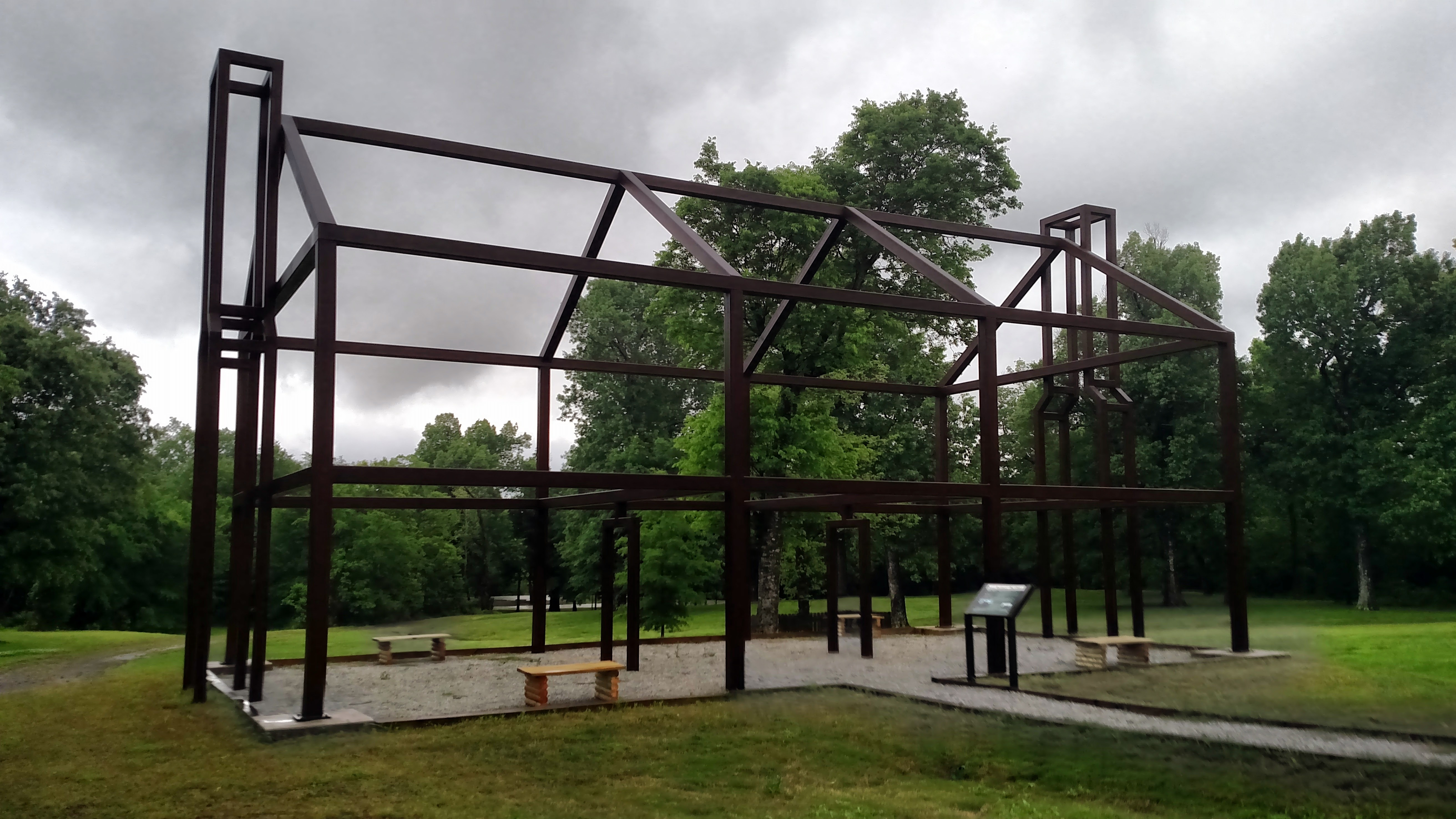
A "ghost structure" in Davidsonville Historic State Park. The park preserves and interprets the history of one of Arkansas's earliest settlements, which was abandoned by the 1830s.

- Antioch
- Attica
- Birdell
- Brakebill
- Brockett
- Cedar Grove
- Dalton
- Dunn
- East Pocahontas
- Elevenpoint
- Elkins Park
- Elm Store
- Elnora
- Engelberg
- Fender
- Glaze Creek
- Gravesville
- Hamil
- Hoover Landing
- Ingram
- Jerrett
- Lesterville
- Lorine
- Manson
- Middlebrook
- Minorca
- Noland
- Old Reyno
- Old Siloam
- Palestine
- Pitman
- Shannon
- Sharum
- Skaggs
- Stokes
- Stoney Point
- Supply
- Washington

=== Historical communities ===
- Baker Den
- Davidsonville
- Debrow
- Keller
- Kingsville
- Mock
- Oconee
- Poluca
- Running Lake
- Watervalley
- Yadkin

=== Townships ===
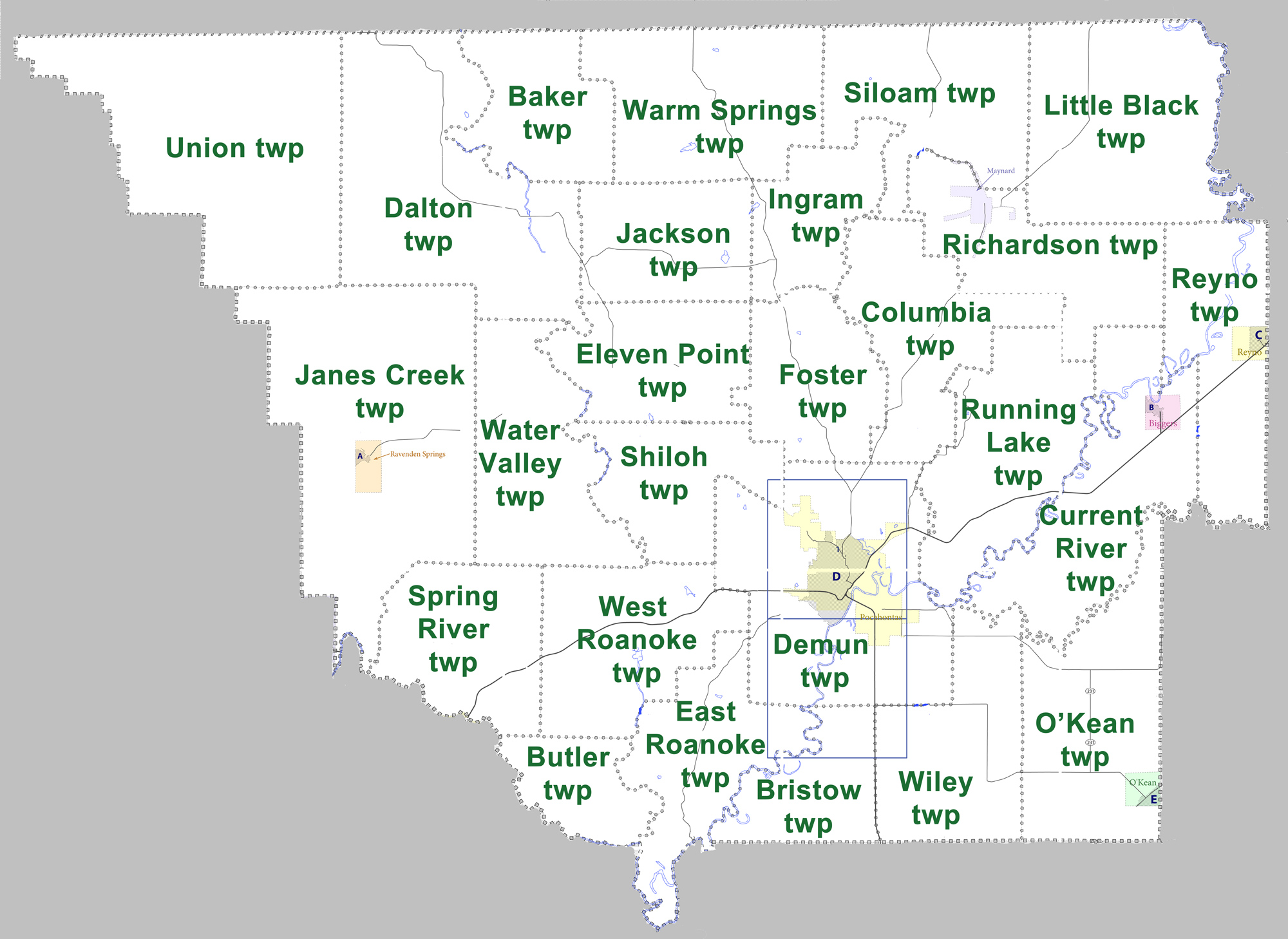
Townships in Randolph County, Arkansas as of 2010

Townships in Arkansas are the divisions of a county. Each township includes unincorporated areas; some may have incorporated cities or towns within part of their boundaries. Arkansas townships have limited purposes in modern times. However, the United States census does list Arkansas population based on townships (sometimes referred to as "county subdivisions" or "minor civil divisions"). Townships are also of value for historical purposes in terms of genealogical research. Each town or city is within one or more townships in an Arkansas county based on census maps and publications. The townships of Randolph County are listed below; listed in parentheses are the cities, towns, and/or census-designated places that are fully or partially inside the township.

- Baker
- Bristow
- Butler
- Columbia
- Current River (Biggers)
- Dalton
- Demun (Pocahontas)
- East Roanoke
- Eleven Point
- Foster
- Ingram
- Jackson
- Janes Creek (Ravenden Springs)
- Little Black
- O'Kean (O'Kean)
- Reyno (Reyno)
- Richardson (Maynard)
- Running Lake
- Shiloh
- Siloam
- Spring River
- Union
- Warm Springs
- Water Valley
- West Roanoke
- Wiley

== Notable people ==
- Joseph J. Alexander, Randolph County's first representative at Arkansas' first State Assembly after becoming a state. He was killed December 4, 1837, by the Speaker of the House, John Wilson, during a knife fight on the floor of the assembly chamber.
- George Nicholas 'Nick' Wilson (1942 - ), former Arkansas lawyer and political leader who served in the Arkansas Senate for almost 30 years.

== See also ==
- National Register of Historic Places listings in Randolph County, Arkansas
