= Randolph County Courthouse =

Randolph County Courthouse or Old Randolph County Courthouse may refer to:

- Old Randolph County Courthouse (Arkansas), Pocahontas, Arkansas
- Randolph County Courthouse (Arkansas), Pocahontas, Arkansas
- Randolph County Courthouse (Illinois), Chester, Illinois
- Randolph County Courthouse (North Carolina), Asheboro, North Carolina
- Randolph County Courthouse and Jail, Elkins, West Virginia
