= Pocahontas Commercial Historic District =

Historic district in Arkansas, United States

- U.S. National Register of Historic Places
- U.S. Historic district
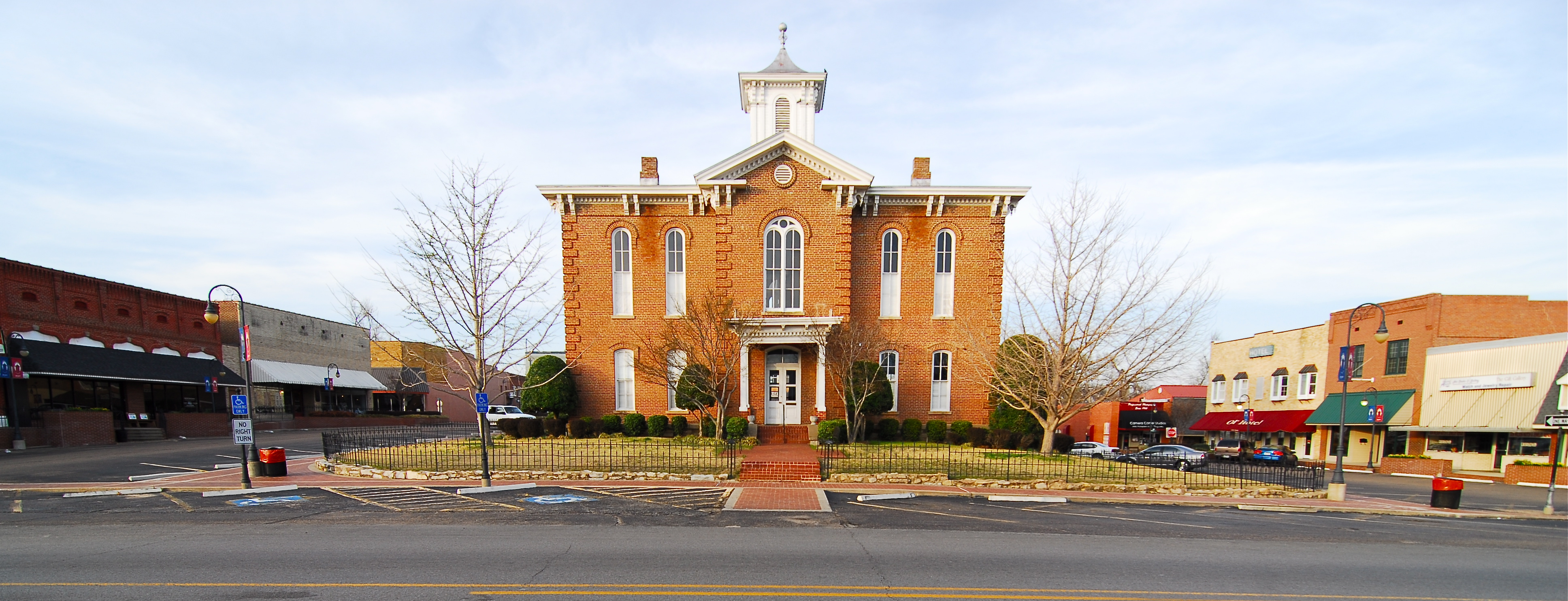
- View of old courthouse and surrounding blocks

- Location within Arkansas Location within the United States
- Location: roughly bounded by Rice, Thomasville, Jordan and McDonald Sts., Pocahontas, Arkansas
- Coordinates: 36.2618°N 90.97031°W
- Area: 13.8 acres (5.6 ha)
- Built: 1875
- Architect: Lesmeister, Henry; et al.
- Architectural style: Late Victorian, Modern Movement
- NRHP reference No.: 09000315
- Added to NRHP: June 12, 2009

The Pocahontas Commercial Historic District encompasses the historic civic heart of Pocahontas, the county seat of Randolph County, Arkansas. The district includes roughly five-block stretches of Broadway and Pyburn and Everett Streets between US 67 and Bryant Street, and extends across US 67 to include a small complex of industrial buildings and the former railroad depot. Founded in 1836, the center of Pocahontas is dominated by the Old Randolph County Courthouse, a handsome Italianate structure built in 1875 which now houses city offices. It is surrounded by commercial buildings, generally one or two stories in height, most of which were built between 1900 and 1930, although there are a few 19th-century buildings. Later growth extended away from this center. Other notable buildings in the district include the present Randolph County Courthouse and the 1930s Art Deco style Post Office building.

The district was listed on the National Register of Historic Places in 2009.

== See also ==
- National Register of Historic Places listings in Randolph County, Arkansas
