= Yadkin Church =

Historic church in Arkansas, United States

- U.S. National Register of Historic Places
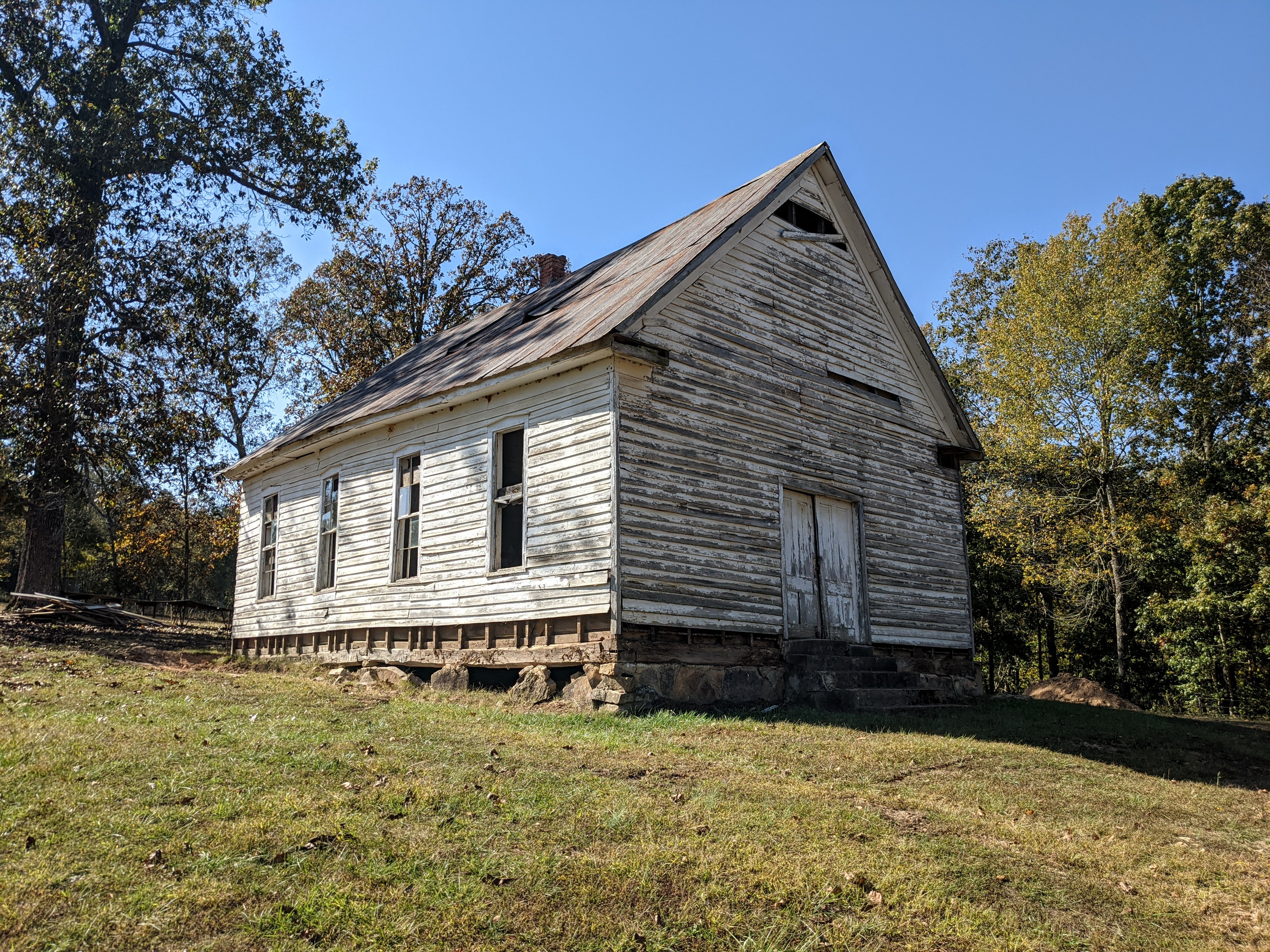

- Location within Arkansas Location within the United States
- Location: Upper James Creek Road, Ravenden Springs, Arkansas
- Coordinates: 36°22′45″N 91°14′46″W
- Area: less than one acre
- Built: c. 1894
- Architectural style: Plain-traditional
- NRHP reference No.: 100004003
- Added to NRHP: May 30, 2019

The Yadkin Church is a historic church building on Upper Janes Creek Road in rural Randolph County, Arkansas, north of Ravenden Springs. Built about 1894, it is a single-story wood-frame structure, with a gabled roof and clapboarded exterior. The main entrance is on the otherwise unadorned northeast face, and consists of a pair of paneled doors. Sash windows line the side walls, with one on the rear wall. It is the only significant surviving element of the town of Yadkin, which was a thriving farm community in the early 20th century. It was last used for regular services about 1950.

The building was listed on the National Register of Historic Places in 2019.

== See also ==
- National Register of Historic Places listings in Randolph County, Arkansas
