= Campbell Cemetery =

Historic cemetery in Arkansas, United States

- U.S. National Register of Historic Places
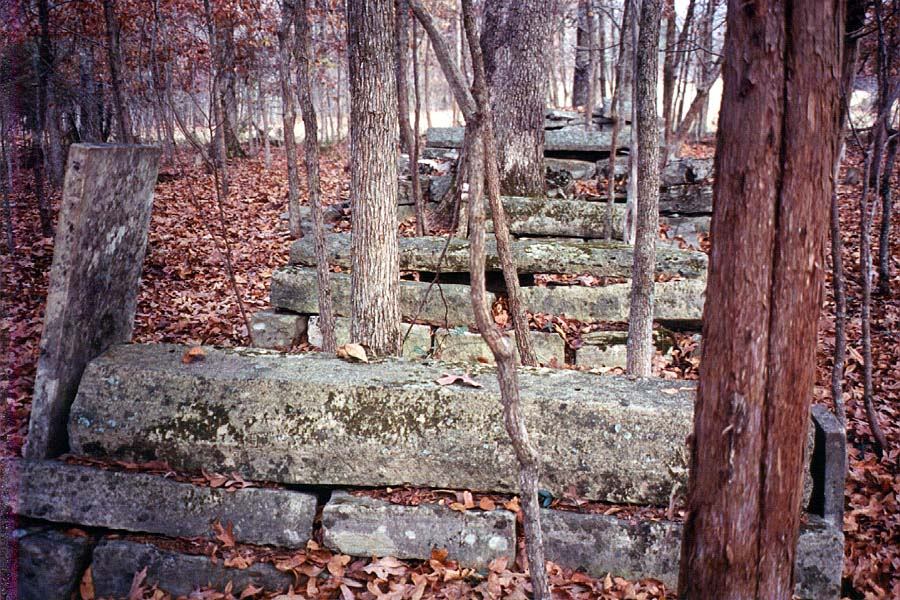

- Location within Arkansas Location within the United States
- Nearest city: Imboden, Arkansas
- Built: 1835
- NRHP reference No.: 05000463
- Added to NRHP: May 25, 2005

Campbell Cemetery is a historic cemetery in rural southwestern Randolph County, Arkansas, southeast of Imboden near the Spring River. It is a small family cemetery, and is notable for one of its earliest burials, that of James Campbell (b. 1780), the first judge and county sheriff of Lawrence County, the second county established in what is now the state of Arkansas, and an early settler of Randolph County,.

The cemetery was listed on the National Register of Historic Places in 2005.

== See also ==
- National Register of Historic Places listings in Randolph County, Arkansas
