= Hillyard Cabin =

Historic house in Arkansas, United States

- U.S. National Register of Historic Places
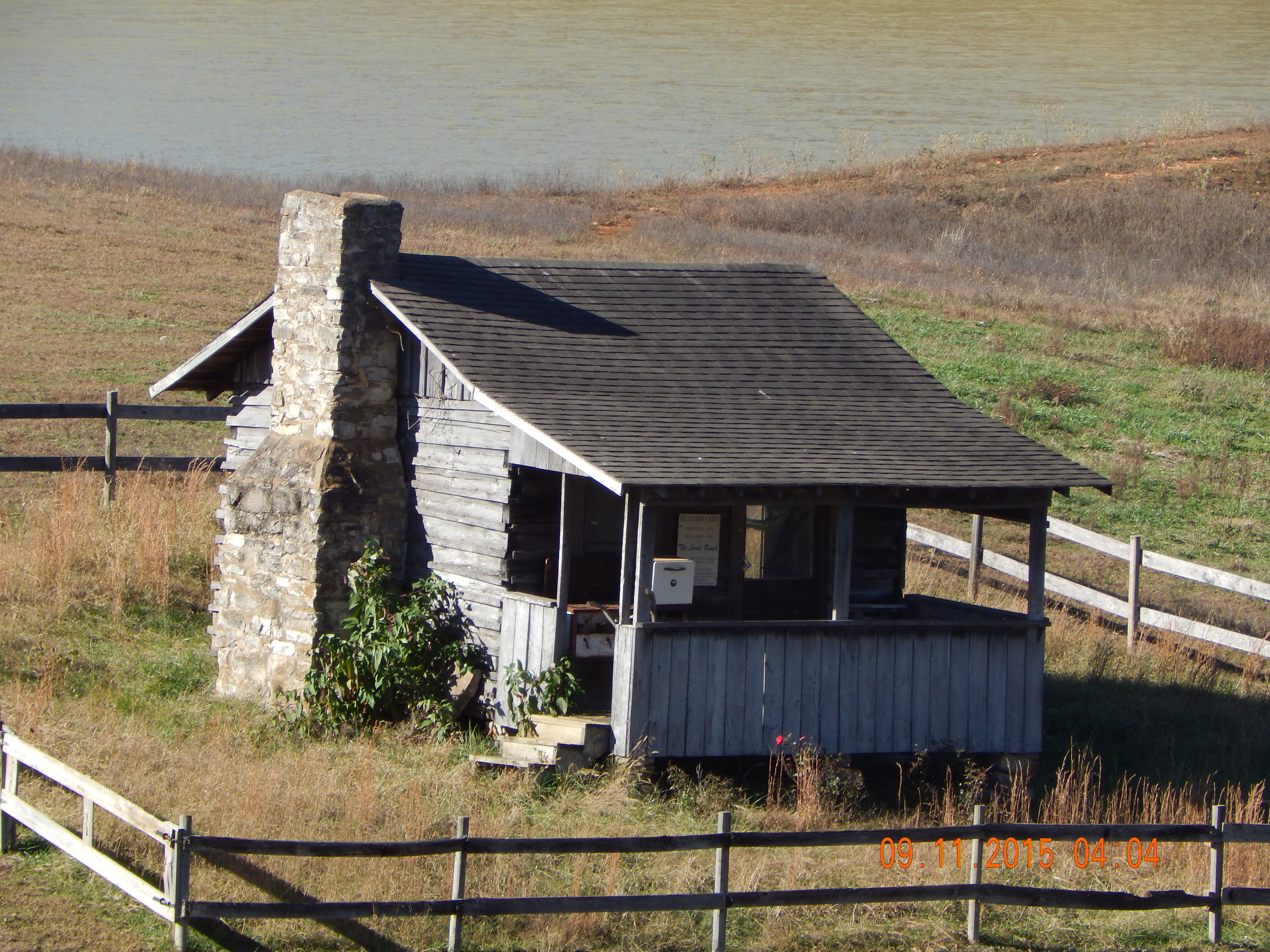

- Location within Arkansas Location within the United States
- Nearest city: Warm Springs, Arkansas
- Coordinates: 36°29′2″N 91°2′4″W
- Area: less than one acre
- Built: 1933
- Architectural style: Rustic
- NRHP reference No.: 94000851
- Added to NRHP: August 16, 1994

The Hillyard Cabin is a historic log cabin on Old Burr Road, northeast of Warm Springs, Arkansas. It is a single-pen log structure, with a gable roof and a fieldstone chimney. The pen is 14 feet (4.3 m) square, fashioned out of sawn logs laid without chinking. The east-facing front facade has a shed-roof porch extending across its width, with a doorway into the cabin on the right and a window on the left. The cabin was built in 1932-33 by a local resident for his brother, an Illinois resident, to use as a vacation site. The cabin is architecturally significant for its distinctive sawn-log construction style, in 1994, at which time it was undergoing restoration and rehabilitation.

== See also ==
- National Register of Historic Places listings in Randolph County, Arkansas
