= Old Union School (Birdell, Arkansas) =

- U.S. National Register of Historic Places
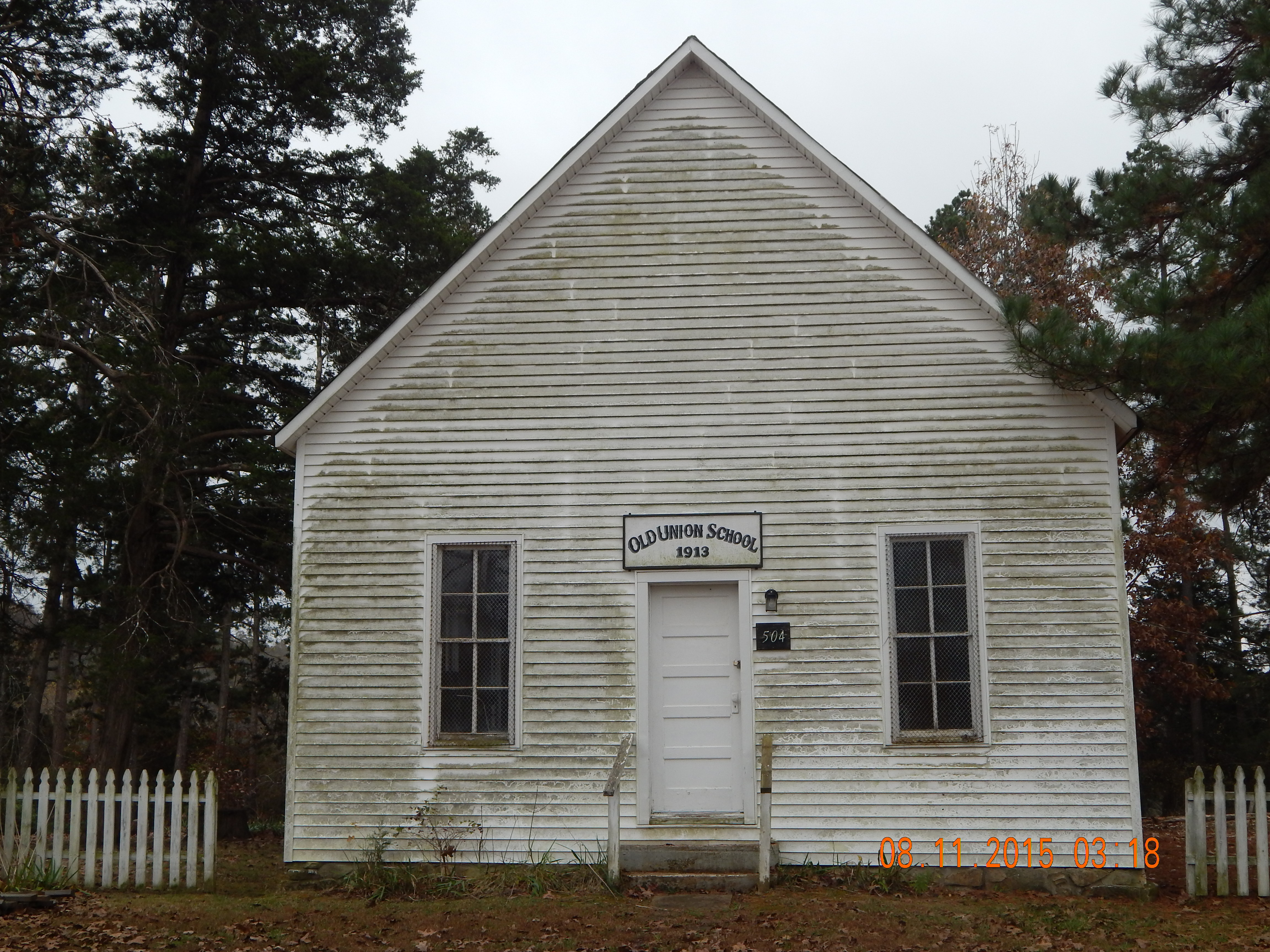

- Location within Arkansas Location within the United States
- Nearest city: Birdell, Arkansas
- Coordinates: 36°15′41″N 91°6′7″W
- Area: less than one acre
- Architect: William C. Campbell, et al
- Architectural style: Plain Traditional
- NRHP reference No.: 93001203
- Added to NRHP: November 12, 1993

The Old Union School is a historic school building at 504 Old Union Road in Birdell, Arkansas. It is a single-story wood frame Plain Traditional structure, with a corrugated metal gable roof and a stone foundation. Built in 1913, it is one of the few older structures in Birdell, and the only one-room schoolhouse in southwestern Randolph County. The building was used as a school until 1941, and saw only occasional use for other community purposes until 1991, when it underwent a major restoration. It is now used as a community hall.

The building was listed on the National Register of Historic Places in 1993.

== See also ==
- National Register of Historic Places listings in Randolph County, Arkansas
