= Elevenpoint, Arkansas =

Unincorporated community in Arkansas, US

Coordinates: 36°20′30″N 91°07′39″W

Elevenpoint is an unincorporated community in Randolph County, Arkansas.

== History ==
A post office called Elevenpoint was established in 1915, and remained in operation until 1949. The community was named after the Eleven Point River.
