= Pocahontas Post Office =

- U.S. National Register of Historic Places
- U.S. Historic district – Contributing property
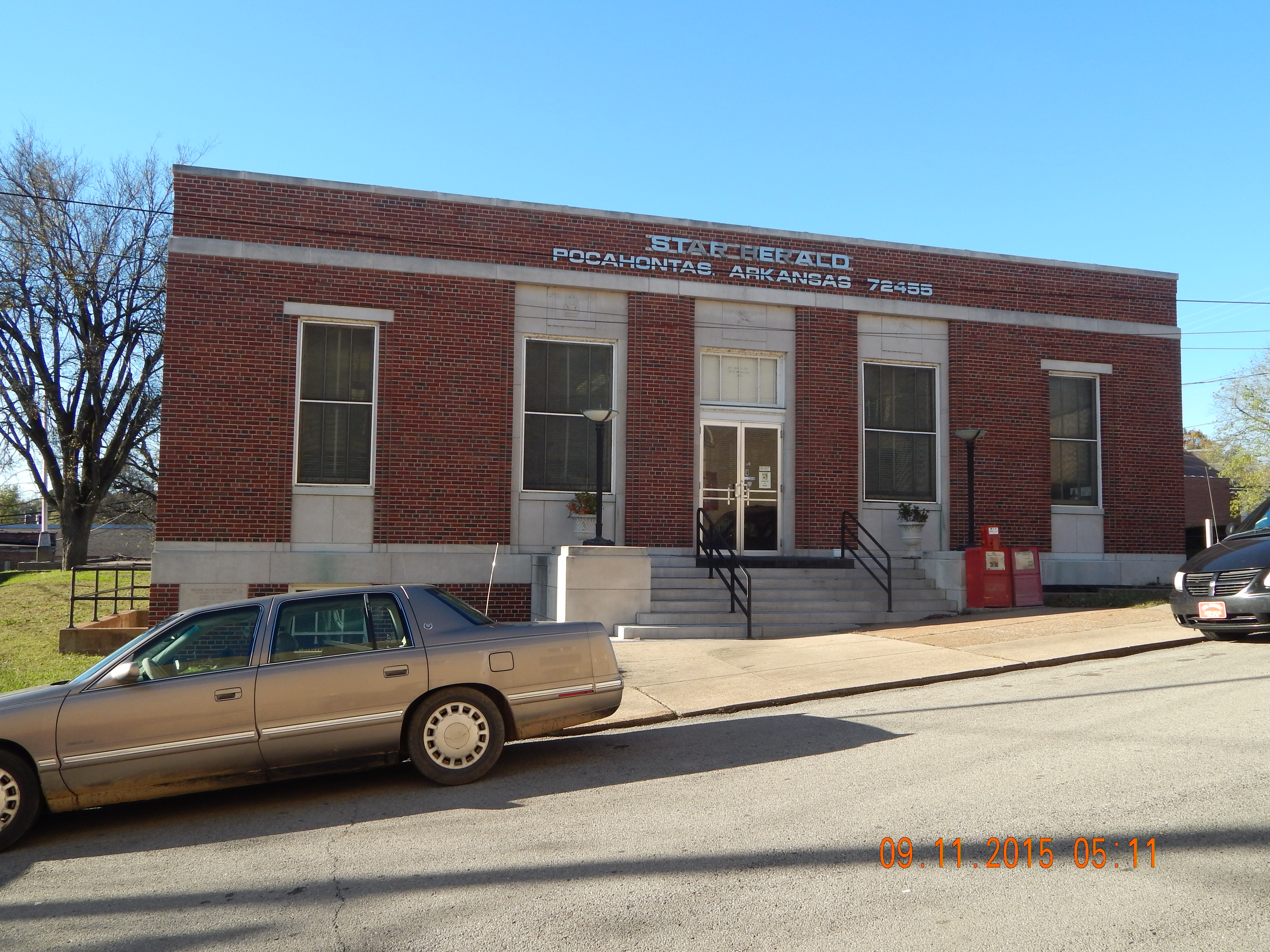

- Location within Arkansas Location within the United States
- Location: 109 Van Bibber St., Pocahontas, Arkansas
- Coordinates: 36°15′43″N 90°58′16″W
- Area: less than one acre
- Built: 1936
- Architect: F.L. Rice, T. Jarvis Co.
- Architectural style: Art Deco
- Part of: Pocahontas Commercial Historic District (ID09000315)
- NRHP reference No.: 02000488

Significant dates
- Added to NRHP: May 16, 2002
- Designated CP: June 12, 2009

The Old Pocahontas Post Office is located at 109 Van Bibber Street in downtown Pocahontas, Arkansas. It is a single-story square brick building with a flat roof highlighted by a concrete cornice. It was built in 1936–37 with funding from the Works Progress Administration, and is a local example of restrained Art Deco architecture. Its main lobby housed a mural funded by the Section of Fine Arts, drawn by H. Louis Freund, entitled Early Days of Pocahontas.

The building was listed on the National Register of Historic Places in 2002.

== See also ==
- National Register of Historic Places listings in Randolph County, Arkansas
- List of United States post offices
- List of United States post office murals
