= Rice-Upshaw House =

Historic house in Arkansas, United States

- U.S. National Register of Historic Places
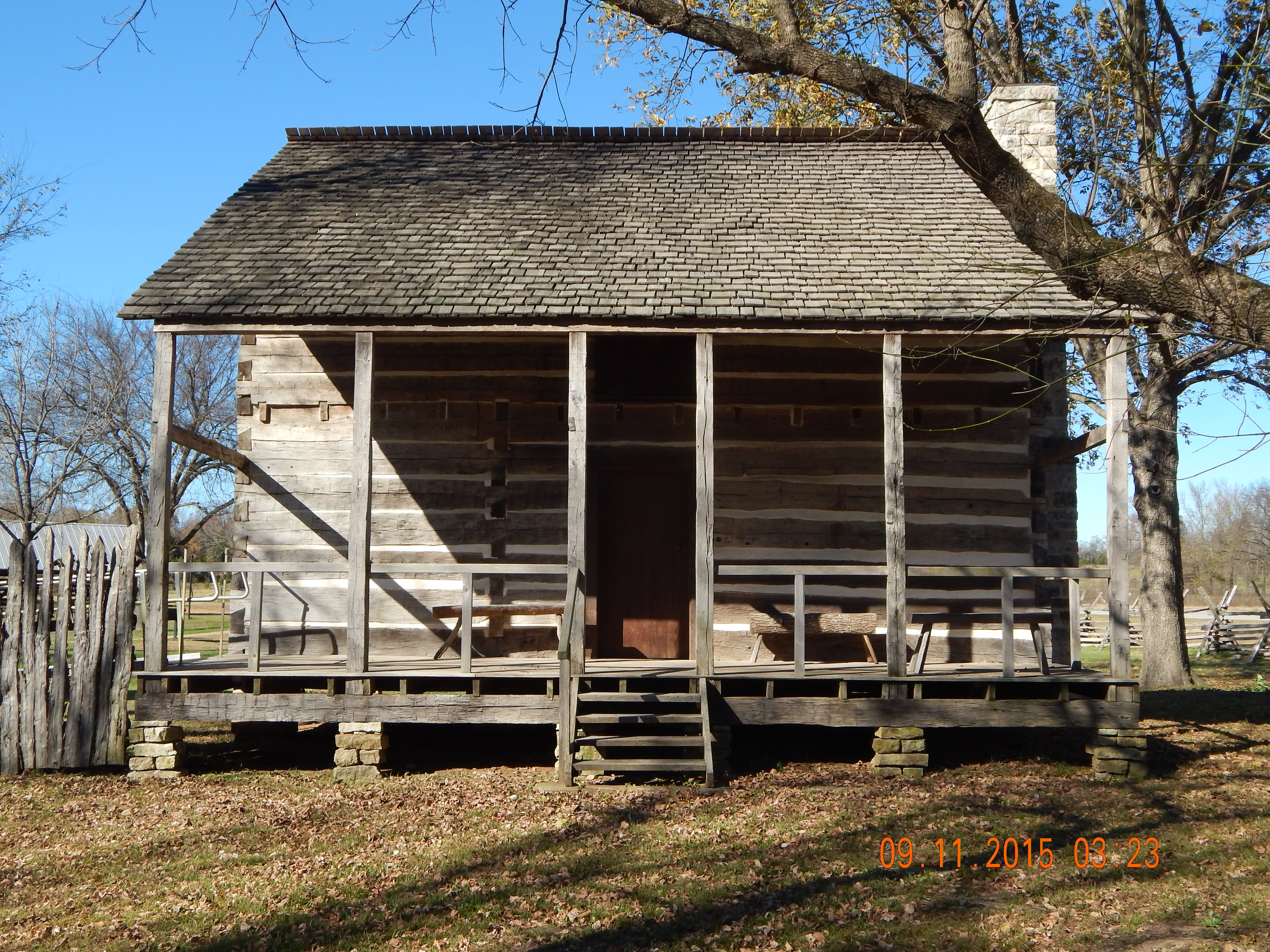

- Location within Arkansas Location within the United States
- Nearest city: Dalton, Arkansas
- Coordinates: 36°25′2″N 91°7′11″W
- Area: less than one acre
- Built: 1826
- Built by: Reuben Rice
- Architectural style: Plain-Traditional
- NRHP reference No.: 04001107
- Added to NRHP: October 6, 2004

The Rice-Upshaw House is a historic house in rural Randolph County, Arkansas. It is located on the west side of Arkansas Highway 93, about 2 miles (3.2 km) south of Dalton, just north of where the highway crosses Upshaw Creek. Built c. 1826, this log structure is one of the oldest buildings in the state of Arkansas, and one of a handful that predate its statehood. It is 1 1/2 stories in height, with a hall and parlor plan. The exterior is clad in shiplap siding. The walls are constructed of rough-hewn logs, from a variety of wood species, that are fitted together with half dovetails. A fieldstone chimney (reconstructed using materials from the original chimney) rises on the east side of the house. The building underwent some alterations c. 1920, including the addition of a corrugated metal roof (replacing wooden shingles), and windows on either side of the chimney. A porch extending on the north side of the building was then closed in, to provide for a bathroom and kitchen. A second porch, on the south side, has also been enclosed.

The house was listed on the National Register of Historic Places in 2004.

== See also ==
- National Register of Historic Places listings in Randolph County, Arkansas
- List of the oldest buildings in Arkansas
