= Marr's Creek Bridge =

- U.S. National Register of Historic Places
- Location within Arkansas Location within the United States
- Location: formerly South Bettis Street, Pocahontas, Arkansas
- Coordinates: 36°15′29″N 90°58′19″W
- Area: less than one acre
- Built: 1934
- Built by: Luten Bridge Co.
- Architect: N.B. Garver
- Architectural style: Spandrel arch bridge
- MPS: Historic Bridges of Arkansas MPS
- NRHP reference No.: 07001433
- Added to NRHP: January 24, 2008

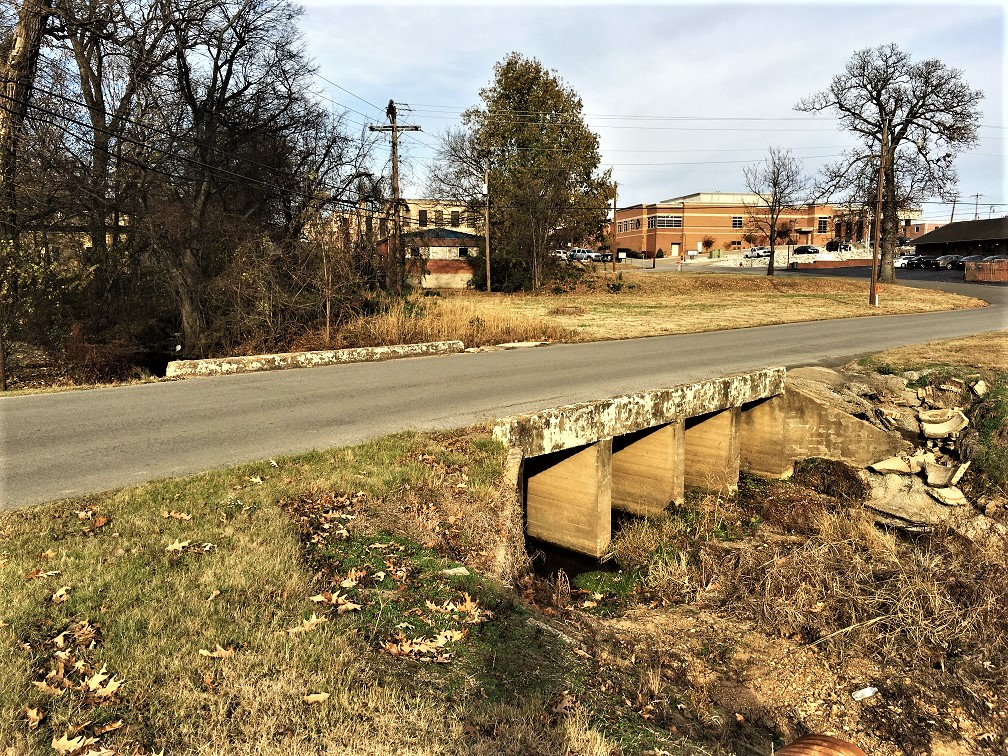
Marr's Creek Bridge NRHP 07001433 Randolph County, AR

The Marr's Creek Bridge is a historic bridge spanning Marr's Creek in Pocahontas, Arkansas. The concrete open spandrel deck arch bridge formerly carried U.S. Route 67 (US 67), which now passes over the creek on an adjacent modern steel and concrete structure. When built in 1934 by the Public Works Administration, the bridge had a total length of 135 feet (41 m), with six spans, including the main arch across the creek. The bridge was widened slightly at its eastern end in 1950 to accommodate a slight curve.

The bridge was listed on the National Register of Historic Places in 2008.

== See also ==
- List of bridges on the National Register of Historic Places in Arkansas
- National Register of Historic Places listings in Randolph County, Arkansas
