= Fender, Arkansas =

Unincorporated community in Arkansas, US

Fender
- Unincorporated community
- Location in Arkansas Fender (the United States)
- Coordinates: 36°10′30″N 90°53′45″W
- Country: United States
- State: Arkansas
- County: Randolph
- Time zone: UTC-6 (Central (CST))
  - Summer (DST): UTC-5 (CDT)

Fender is an unincorporated community in Randolph County, Arkansas, United States.
