= Pocahontas Federal Savings and Loan =

- U.S. National Register of Historic Places
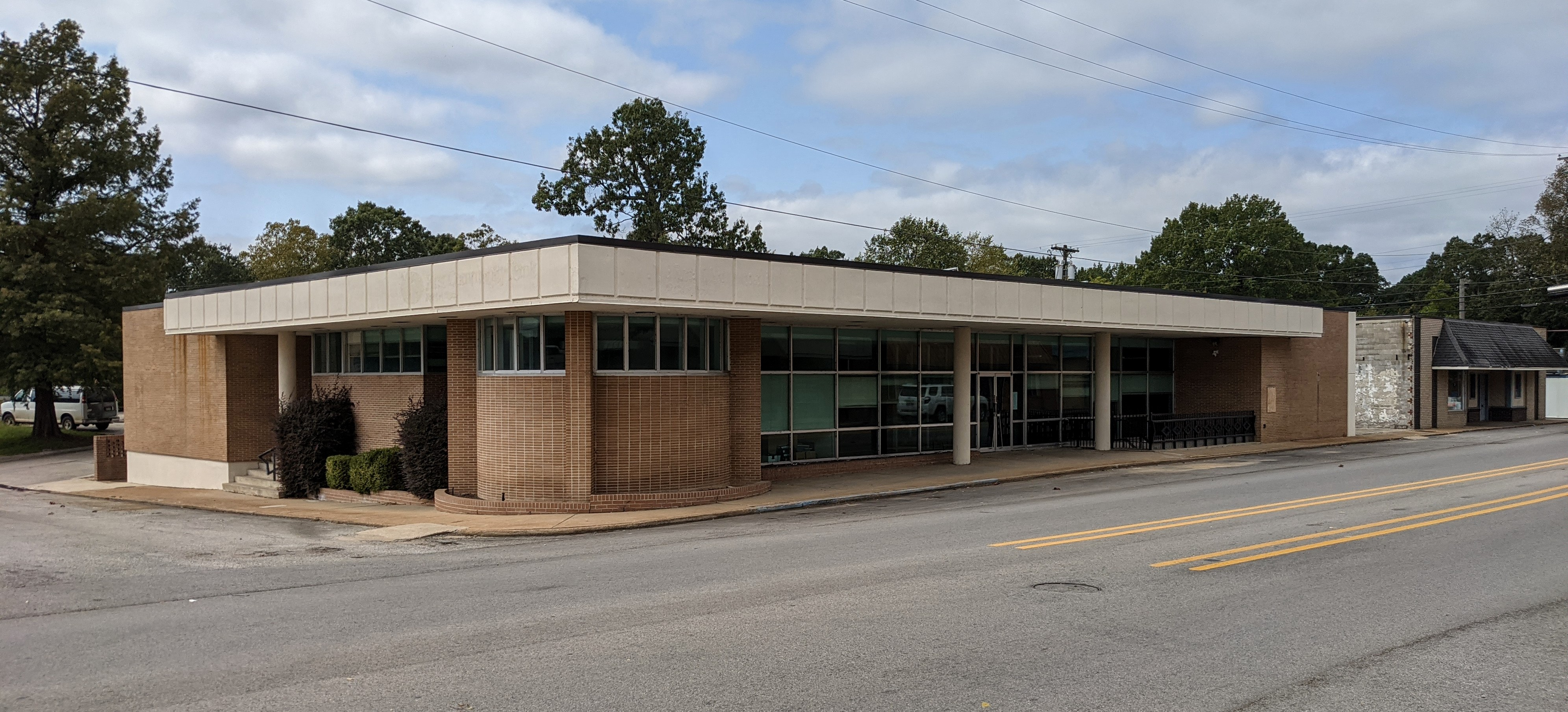
- Pocahontas Federal Savings and Loan

- Location within Arkansas Location within the United States
- Location: 201 West Broadway St., Pocahontas, Arkansas
- Coordinates: 36°15′42″N 90°58′17″W
- Area: less than one acre
- Built: 1960
- Architect: Reed & Willis
- Architectural style: Modern Movement
- NRHP reference No.: 100003338
- Added to NRHP: January 24, 2019

The Pocahontas Federal Savings and Loan is a historic commercial building at 201 West Broadway Street in Pocahontas, Arkansas. It is a roughly rectangular two-story building, with brick walls and a flat roof covered with tar and gravel. It was built in 1960 to a design by Reed & Willis of Pine Bluff, Arkansas, and is a prominent local example of Mid-Century Modern design. The Pocahontas Federal Savings and Loan, for whom it was built, was established in 1910.

The building was listed on the National Register of Historic Places in 2019.

== See also ==
- National Register of Historic Places listings in Randolph County, Arkansas
