= Eddie Mae Herron Center and Museum =

Historic church in Arkansas, United States

- St. Mary's AME Church-Pocahontas Colored School
- U.S. National Register of Historic Places
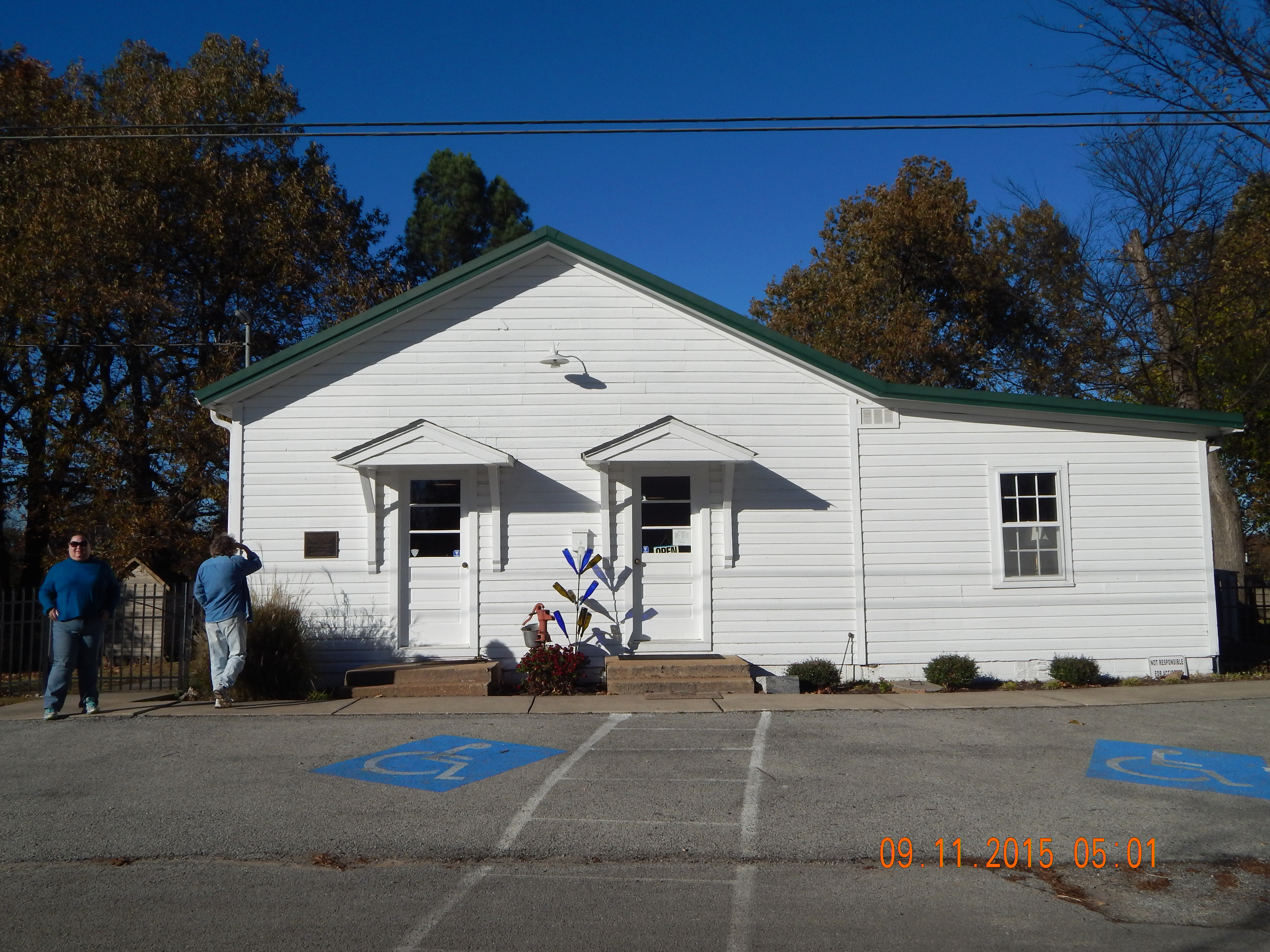

- Location within Arkansas Location within the United States
- Location: 1708 Archer St. Pocahontas, Arkansas
- Coordinates: 36°15′44″N 90°58′53″W
- Area: less than one acre
- Built: 1918
- Architectural style: Plain-Traditional
- NRHP reference No.: 02000830
- Added to NRHP: August 5, 2002

The Eddie Mae Herron Center & Museum is a historic community building at 1708 Archer Street in Pocahontas, Arkansas. Originally built as an African Methodist Episcopal Church and known as St. Mary's AME Church, it is a small one-room wood-frame structure, with a gable roof and novelty siding. A flat-roof addition expands the building to the right. The main facade has two entrances, each sheltered by a small gable-roofed hood. The building was built in 1918, to provide facilities for a church and school to the small African-American community in Pocahontas. It served as a church for thirty years, and as a school known as Pocahontas Colored School for fifty, and was later adapted for other uses, most recently as a museum and community center.

The building was listed on the National Register of Historic Places in 2002 as the St. Mary's AME Church—Pocahontas Colored School. It was a one-room schoolhouse.

Eddie Mae Herron was a teacher in the Biggers School District who transferred to Pocahontas after Biggers Colored School closed, along with that school's students, becoming Pocahontas Colored School's only teacher between 1948 and 1965.

== See also ==
- National Register of Historic Places listings in Randolph County, Arkansas
