= Cedar Grove School No. 81 =

- Cedar Grove School #81
- U.S. National Register of Historic Places
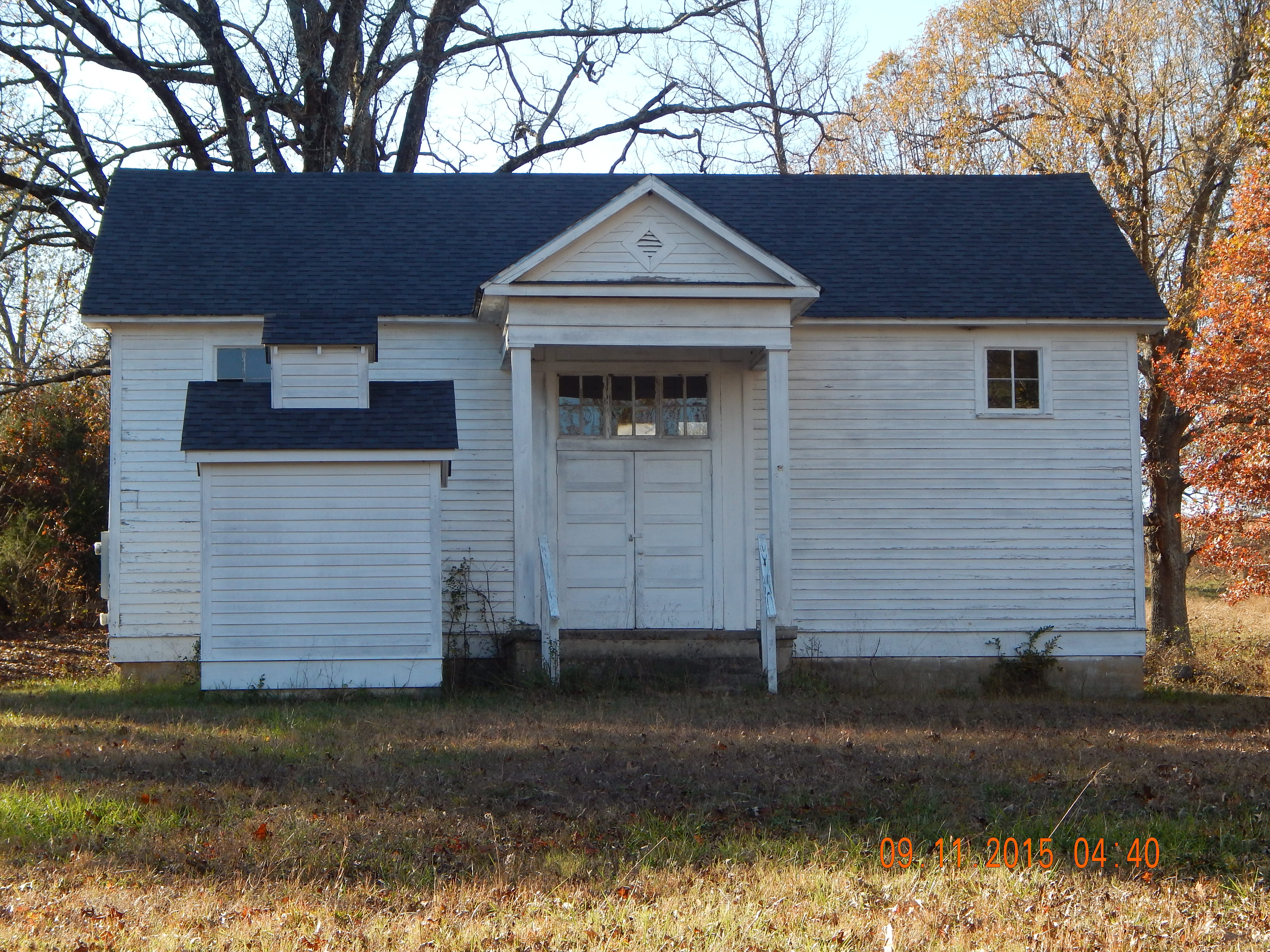

- Location within Arkansas Location within the United States
- Nearest city: Pocahontas, Arkansas
- Coordinates: 36°19′57″N 90°57′6″W
- Area: 1 acre (0.40 ha)
- Built: 1938
- Architectural style: Classical Revival
- MPS: Public Schools in the Ozarks MPS
- NRHP reference No.: 03001452
- Added to NRHP: January 21, 2004

The Cedar Grove School #81 is a historic school building on the west side of Arkansas Highway 115, in the small community of Brockett, Arkansas, about 5 miles (8.0 km) north of Pocahontas. It is a wood frame one-room schoolhouse, 23 by 41 feet (7.0 m × 12.5 m) in size, with a gable roof and a concrete foundation. It was built in 1938, replacing another building destroyed by a tornado, and served as a district school until 1948, when the district was consolidated into the Pocahontas schools. The building has been used since then by the Brockett Home Extension Club as a community center.

The building was listed on the National Register of Historic Places in 2004.

== See also ==
- National Register of Historic Places listings in Randolph County, Arkansas
