= Birdell, Arkansas =

- Unincorporated community
- Location within Arkansas Location within the United States
- Coordinates: 36°14′40″N 91°04′41″W
- Country: United States
- State: Arkansas
- County: Randolph
- Elevation: 318 ft (97 m)
- Time zone: UTC-6 (Central (CST))
  - Summer (DST): UTC-5 (CDT)
- Area code: 870
- GNIS feature ID: 56930

Birdell is an unincorporated community in Randolph County, Arkansas, United States. Birdell is located on U.S. Route 62, 6.1 miles (9.8 km) west-southwest of Pocahontas.

The Old Union School in Birdell is listed on the National Register of Historic Places.
