= Ravenden Springs School =

- U.S. National Register of Historic Places
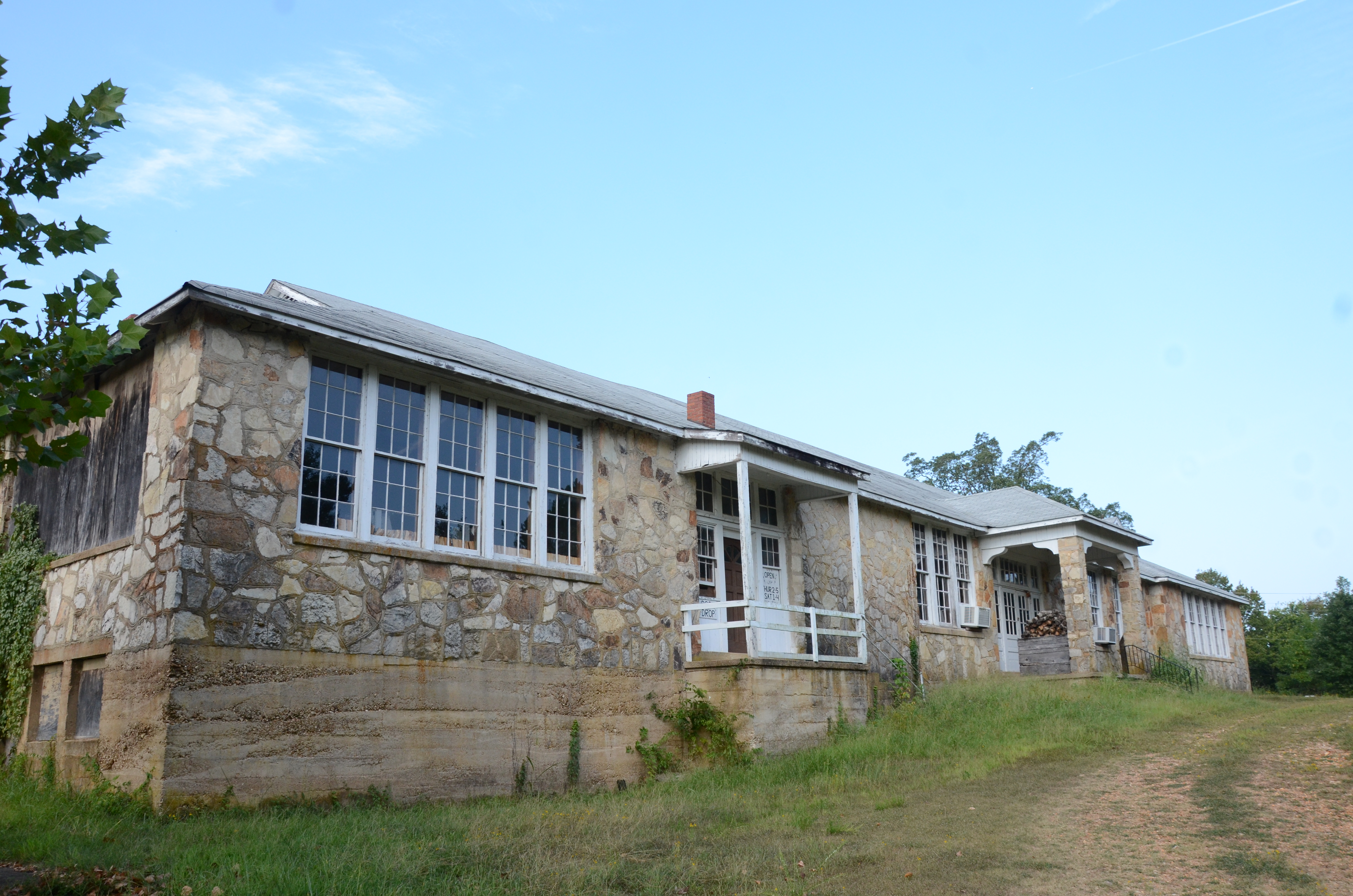

- Location within Arkansas Location within the United States
- Location: end of Ash Street, Ravenden Springs, Arkansas
- Coordinates: 36°18′52″N 91°13′26″W
- Area: less than one acre
- Built: 1941
- Architectural style: Bungalow/craftsman
- MPS: Public Schools in the Ozarks MPS
- NRHP reference No.: 03001379
- Added to NRHP: January 14, 2004

The Ravenden Springs School is a historic school building on Ash and Wells Streets in Ravenden Springs, Arkansas. It is a large single-story fieldstone structure with a hip roof, built in 1941. It has Craftsman styling, notable in its front porch, and grouping of windows on the sides. The building was used as a school until 1974, and went through a number of ownership changes before its reacquisition by the town in 1990.

The building was listed on the National Register of Historic Places in 2004, at which time it was being adapted to house town offices.

== See also ==
- National Register of Historic Places listings in Randolph County, Arkansas
