= Looney–French House =

Historic house in Arkansas, United States

- U.S. National Register of Historic Places
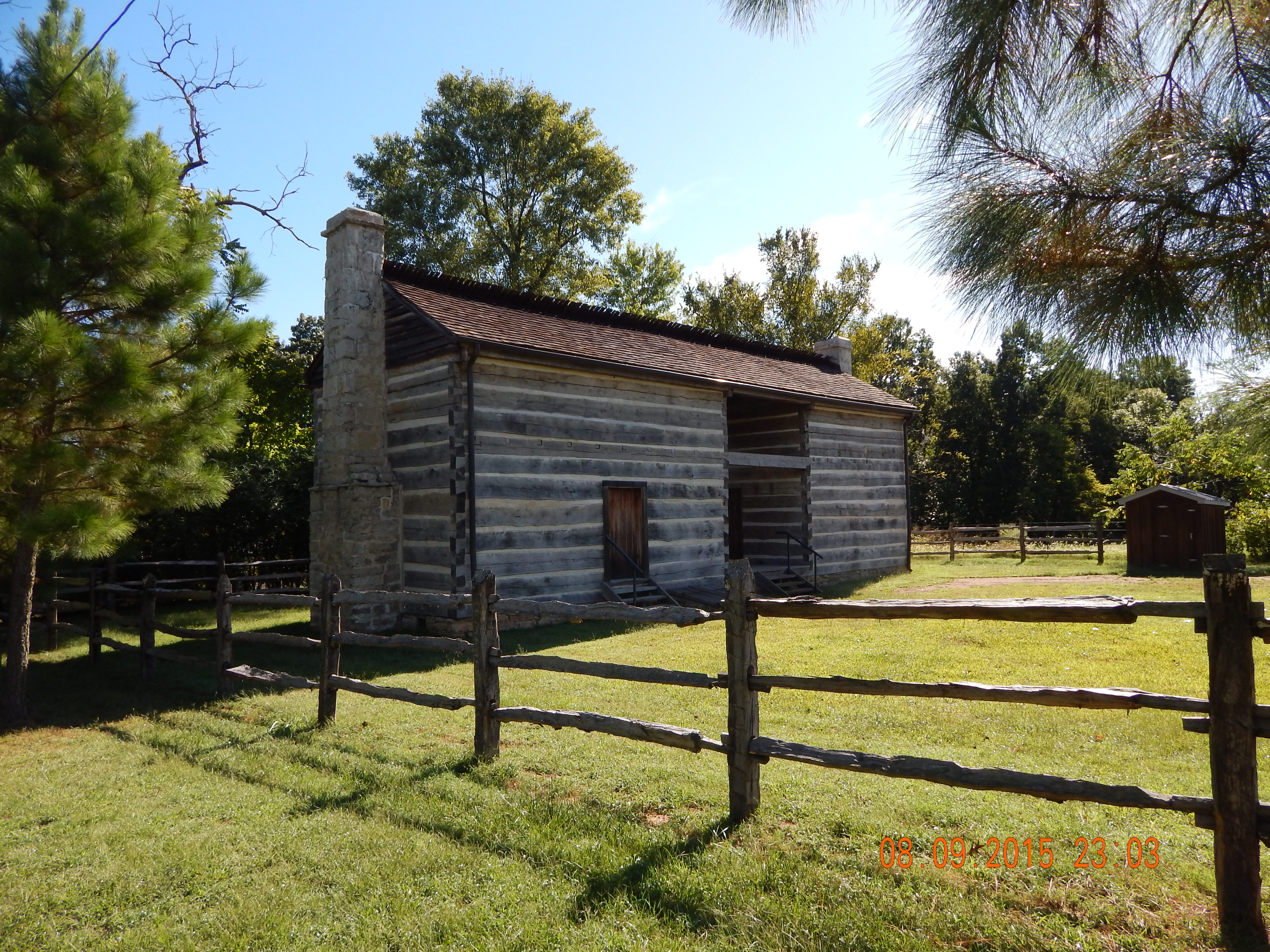

- Location within Arkansas Location within the United States
- Nearest city: Dalton, Arkansas
- Coordinates: 36°23′50″N 91°7′22″W
- Area: 1.5 acres (0.61 ha)
- Built: 1833
- Architectural style: Dogtrot
- NRHP reference No.: 04001035
- Added to NRHP: September 23, 2004

The Looney–French House is a historic house at 1325 Deer Run Trail in Dalton, Arkansas. Built c. 1833, this 1 1/2-story dogtrot house is one of the oldest standing buildings in Arkansas. Its builder, William Looney, was one of the first white settlers of the area, arriving in 1802. The house has two unequally-sized log pens, with the breezeway between now enclosed. The house is finished with a gable roof and weatherboard siding, and is mounted on a 20th-century concrete foundation. Each pen has a chimney made from stone cut from the nearby banks of the Eleven Point River.

The house was listed on the National Register of Historic Places in 2004.

== See also ==
- National Register of Historic Places listings in Randolph County, Arkansas
- List of the oldest buildings in Arkansas
