= Warm Springs, Arkansas =

- Census-designated place
- Location within Arkansas Location within the United States
- Coordinates: 36°28′59″N 91°02′56″W
- Country: United States
- State: Arkansas
- County: Randolph
- Elevation: 479 ft (146 m)

Population (2020)
  - Total: 47
- Time zone: UTC-6 (Central (CST))
  - Summer (DST): UTC-5 (CDT)
- ZIP code: 72478
- Area code: 870
- GNIS feature ID: 2805694

Warm Springs is an unincorporated community and census-designated place (CDP) in Randolph County, Arkansas, United States. Warm Springs is located on Arkansas Highway 251, 15.5 miles (24.9 km) north-northwest of Pocahontas. It was first listed as a CDP in the 2020 census with a population of 47.

Warm Springs has a ZIP Code of 72478, but does not have a post office nor a collection box.

== Demographics ==
Historical population
Census	Pop.	Note	%±
2020	47		—
U.S. Decennial Census; 2020

=== 2020 census ===
Warm Springs CDP, Arkansas – Demographic Profile (NH = Non-Hispanic) Note: the US Census treats Hispanic/Latino as an ethnic category. This table excludes Latinos from the racial categories and assigns them to a separate category. Hispanics/Latinos may be of any race.
Race / Ethnicity	Pop 2020	% 2020
White alone (NH)	36	76.60%
Black or African American alone (NH)	0	0.00%
Native American or Alaska Native alone (NH)	0	0.00%
Asian alone (NH)	0	0.00%
Pacific Islander alone (NH)	0	0.00%
Some Other Race alone (NH)	0	0.00%
Mixed Race/Multi-Racial (NH)	4	8.51%
Hispanic or Latino (any race)	7	14.89%
Total	47	100.00%
