= Old Randolph County Courthouse (Arkansas) =

- U.S. National Register of Historic Places
- U.S. Historic district – Contributing property
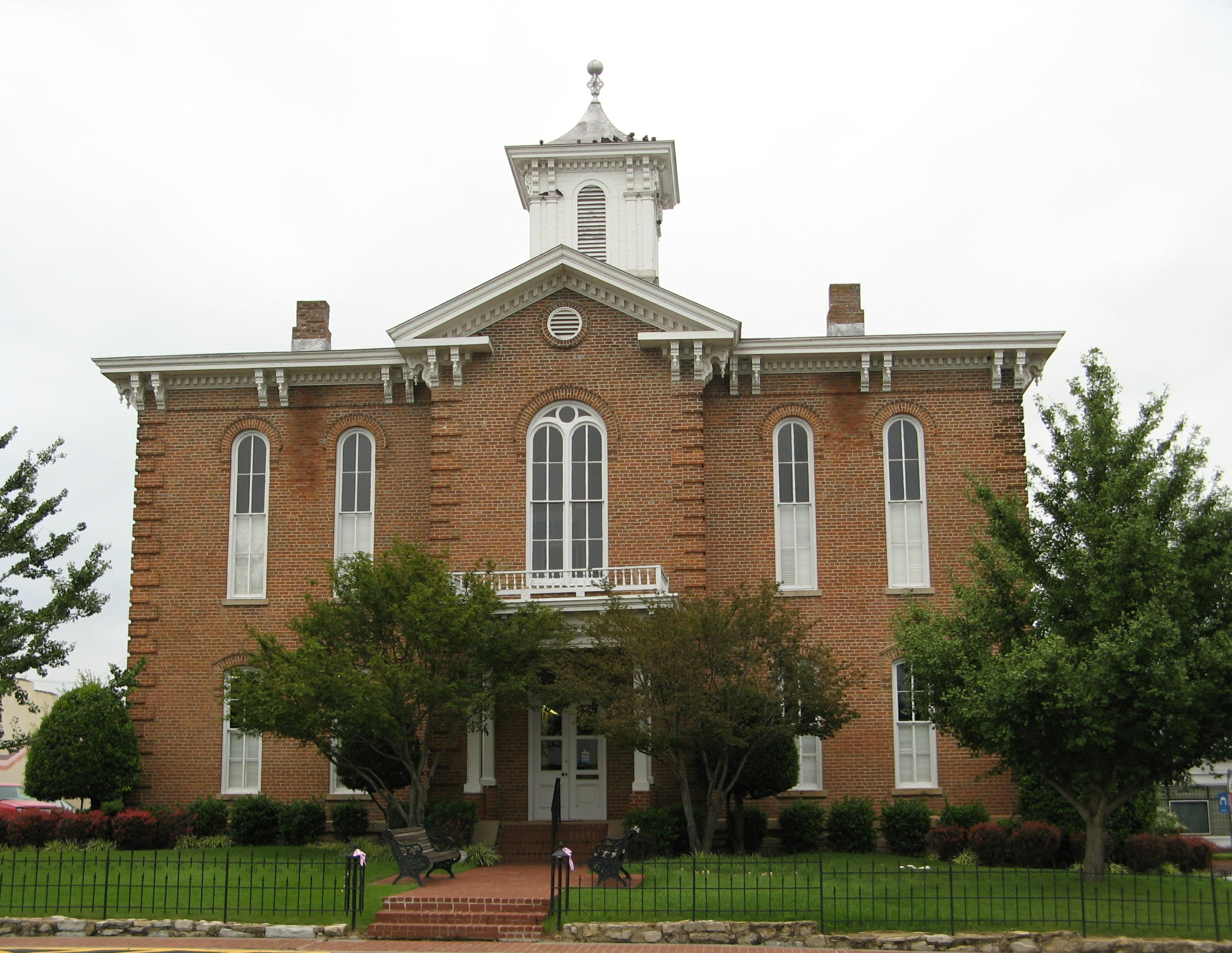

- Location within Arkansas Location within the United States
- Location: Broadway and Vance St. Pocahontas, Arkansas
- Coordinates: 36°15′38″N 90°58′10″W
- Built: 1875
- Part of: Pocahontas Commercial Historic District (ID09000315)
- NRHP reference No.: 73000390

Significant dates
- Added to NRHP: April 24, 1973
- Designated CP: June 12, 2009

The Old Randolph County Courthouse is a historic former county courthouse at Broadway and Vance Street in the center of Pocahontas, Arkansas. It is a two-story Italianate Victorian brick structure, built in 1872, regionally distinctive for its architectural style. It has brick quoined corners, and a low hip roof with small central gables on each elevation, and a square cupola with flared roof. Its eaves are studded with paired brackets and dentil moulding. It served as the county courthouse until 1940, and has since then has housed city offices, the local public library, and other offices.

The building was listed on the National Register of Historic Places in 1973.

== See also ==
- Randolph County Courthouse, also listed, and also in Pocohontas
- National Register of Historic Places listings in Randolph County, Arkansas
