= Randolph County Courthouse (Arkansas) =

- U.S. National Register of Historic Places
- U.S. Historic district – Contributing property
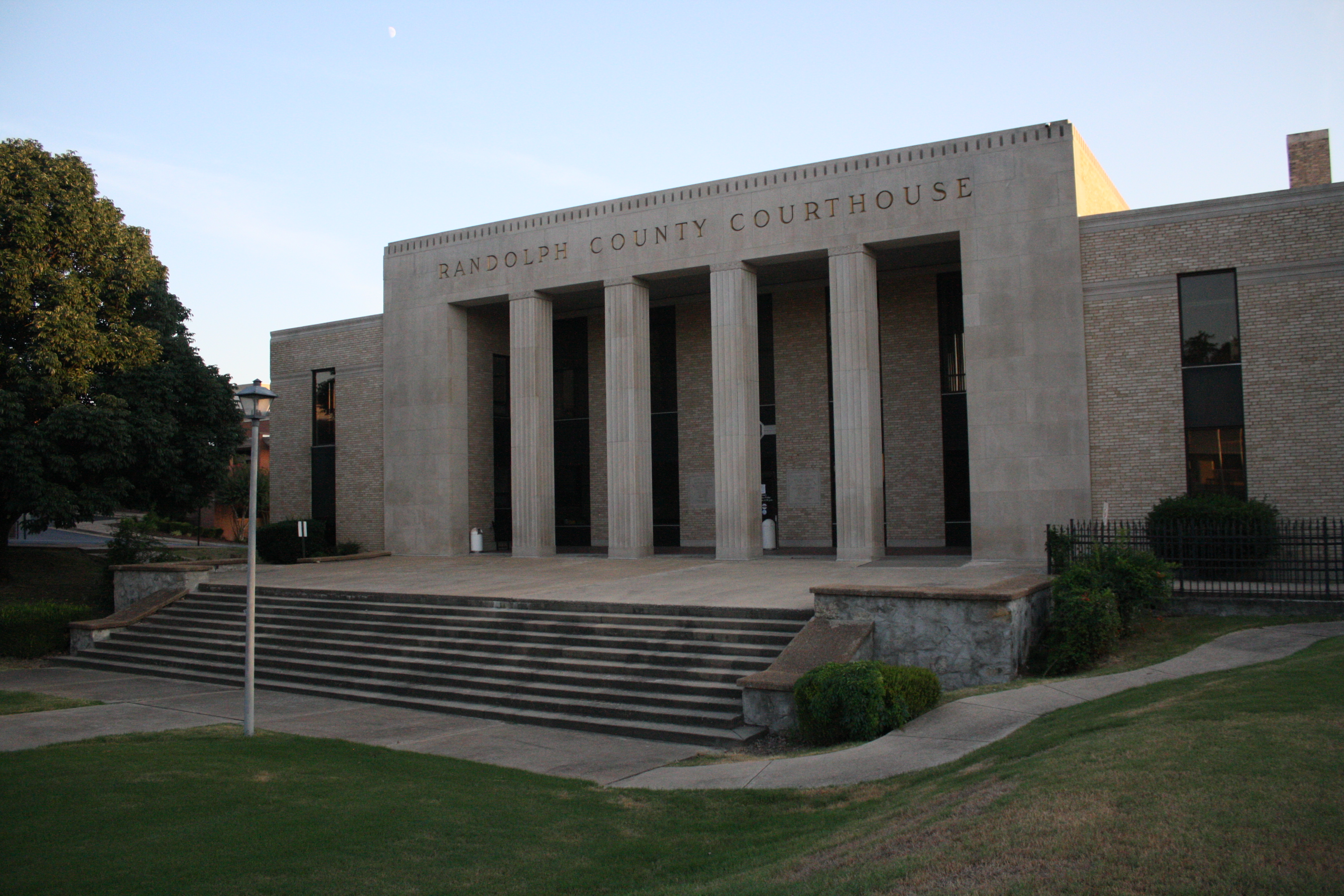

- Location within Arkansas Location within the United States
- Interactive map showing the location of Randolph County Courthouse
- Location: Jct. of Broadway and N. Marr Sts., SW corner, Pocahontas, Arkansas
- Coordinates: 36°15′39″N 90°58′16″W
- Built: 1940
- Architect: Stern, Eugene John
- Architectural style: Art Deco
- Part of: Pocahontas Commercial Historic District (ID09000315)
- NRHP reference No.: 96000910

Significant dates
- Added to NRHP: August 22, 1996
- Designated CP: June 12, 2009

The Randolph County Courthouse is located at the southwest corner of Broadway and North Marr Street in downtown Pocahontas, the county seat of Randolph County, Arkansas. It is a two-story brick and concrete Art Deco building, designed by Eugene John Stern and built in 1940 with funding from the Works Progress Administration. The primary construction material is buff-colored brick, but its raised central section is faced in gray concrete, which is also used in banding around the sides of the building. The central section has an arcade created by four tall fluted square pillars with capitals reminiscent of Corinthian design. The building replaced the old courthouse, an 1870s Italianate building that now houses other civic offices.

The building was listed on the National Register of Historic Places in 1996.

== See also ==
- Old Randolph County Courthouse, also NRHP-listed, also in Pocohontas, built in the 1870s
