= List of museums in Arkansas =

This is a list of museums in Arkansas, defined for this context as institutions (including nonprofit organizations, government entities, and private businesses) that collect and care for objects of cultural, artistic, scientific, or historical interest and make their collections or related exhibits available for public viewing. Museums that exist only in cyberspace (i.e., virtual museums) are not included.

== Museums ==
Name	Location	County	Region	Area of study	Summary
Altus Heritage House Museum	Altus	Franklin	Arkansas River Valley	Local history	Original German-American State Bank, circa 19th century, with early coal mining equipment, local history
Arkansas Air & Military Museum	Fayetteville	Washington	The Ozarks	Aviation	website, History of aviation in Arkansas and American military conflicts, historic aircraft
Arkansas Arts Center	Little Rock	Pulaski	Little Rock Central Area	Art	
Arkansas Country Doctor Museum	Lincoln	Washington	The Ozarks	Medical	website, life of a small-town doctor and the history of medicine as it was practiced in the early 20th century
Arkansas Entertainers Hall of Fame	Pine Bluff	Jefferson	Arkansas Delta	Hall of fame - Entertainers	Located in the Pine Bluff Convention Center, artifacts and memorabilia of entertainers from Arkansas
Arkansas Governor's Mansion	Little Rock	Pulaski	Little Rock Central Area	Historic house	
Arkansas Historic Wine Museum	Paris	Logan	Arkansas River Valley Region	Industry - Wine making	website, operated by Cowie Wine Cellars, history of wine making in the state
Arkansas Inland Maritime Museum	North Little Rock	Pulaski	Little Rock Central Area	Maritime	Features the submarine USS Razorback (SS-394)
Arkansas Museum of Discovery	Little Rock	Pulaski	Little Rock Central Area	Science	
Arkansas Museum of Natural History	Hot Springs	Garland	Ouachita Mountains	Multiple	website, displays archeological and geological artifacts from Arkansas and from around the world including minerals and fossils
Arkansas Museum of Natural Resources	Smackover	Union	Arkansas Timberlands	Industry - Petroleum	Petroleum industry in Arkansas
Arkansas National Guard Museum	North Little Rock	Pulaski	Little Rock Central Area	Military	History the Arkansas National Guard, Camp Pike and Camp Robinson
Arkansas Post National Memorial	Gillett	Arkansas	Arkansas Delta	History	Commemorates key events at the site: first semi-permanent European settlement in the Lower Mississippi Valley (1686); an American Revolutionary War skirmish (1783); the first territorial capital of Arkansas (1819–1821); and the American Civil War Battle of Fort Hindman (1863)
Arkansas Railroad Museum	Pine Bluff	Jefferson	Arkansas Delta	Railroad	Housed in former railroad shops, features steam locomotives
Arkansas Sports Hall of Fame Museum	North Little Rock	Pulaski	Arkansas Timberlands	Sports	Features men, women and teams from a variety of sports, includes inductees from each of the 78 counties in Arkansas
Arkansas River Visitor Center	Russellville	Pope	Arkansas River Valley Region	Natural history	website, natural and cultural history of the Arkansas River and the construction of Lake Dardanelle, operated by the U.S. Army Corps of Engineers
Arkansas State University Museum	Jonesboro	Craighead	Arkansas Delta	Multiple	website, state history, natural history and cultural heritage
Arkansas Tech Museum	Russellville	Pope	Arkansas River Valley Region	History	website, history and memorabilia of Arkansas Tech University
Arts and Science Center for Southeast Arkansas	Pine Bluff	Jefferson	Arkansas Delta	Multiple	Emphasis on Arkansas and African-American artists, hands-on science exhibits
Ashley County Museum	Hamburg	Ashley	Arkansas Delta	Local history	Located in the Watson House
Aviation Cadet Museum	Eureka Springs	Carroll	The Ozarks	Aviation	website
Baum Gallery	Conway	Faulkner	Little Rock Central Area	Art	website, art gallery in McCastlain Hall of University of Central Arkansas
Bauxite Historical Association & Museum	Bauxite	Saline	Little Rock Central Area	Local history	
Baxter County Historical Museum	Mountain Home	Baxter	The Ozarks	Local history	website, operated by the Baxter County Historical and Genealogical Society
Bella Vista Museum	Bella Vista	Benton	The Ozarks	Local history	website
Belle Museum and Chapel	Charleston	Franklin	Arkansas River Valley Region	Local history	
Boone County Heritage Museum	Harrison	Boone	The Ozarks	Local history	website, operated by the Boone County Historical & Railroad Society, antique collections, pioneer life, railroad and Civil War artifacts, local history collections
Bradbury Art Museum	Jonesboro	Craighead	Arkansas Delta	Art	website, part of Arkansas State University, changing exhibitions of contemporary art in all media
Bradley County Historical Museum	Warren	Bradley	Arkansas Timberlands	Local history	Located in the historic Dr. John Wilson Martin House
Bradley County Veterans Museum	Warren	Bradley	Arkansas Timberlands	Military	website
Bradley House Museum	Jasper	Newton	The Ozarks	Local history	website, operated by the Newton County Historical Society
Bud Walton Arena Razorback Sports Museum	Fayetteville	Washington	The Ozarks	Sports	History of Razorback basketball, track and field, baseball, tennis and golf
Carroll County Heritage Museum	Berryville	Carroll	The Ozarks	Local history	Operated by the Carroll County Historical Society in the historic county courthouse
Central Delta Depot Museum	Brinkley	Monroe	Arkansas Delta	Local history	Operated by the Central Delta Historical Society, showcases the importance of the Louisiana Purchase, the impact of the railroad era and the local history of the delta region
Central High School National Historic Site	Little Rock	Pulaski	Little Rock Central Area	History	History of the Little Rock Nine and forced desegregation in Arkansas
Chaffee Barbershop Museum	Fort Smith	Sebastian	Arkansas River Valley Region	History	Restored 1958 period barbershop where Elvis Presley received his famous first G.I. haircut
Cherokee Village Museum & Learning Center	Cherokee Village	Fulton and Sharp Counties	North Central Arkansas	Community History	website
Clayton House	Fort Smith	Sebastian	Arkansas River Valley Region	Historic house	Victorian Renaissance baroque mansion, operated by the Fort Smith Heritage Foundation
Cleburne County Historical Society Museum	Heber Springs	Cleburne	The Ozarks	Local history	Located in the historic Clarence Frauenthal House
Clinton House Museum	Fayetteville	Washington	The Ozarks	Historic house - Biographical	Early home of Bill and Hillary Clinton
Clinton Presidential Center	Little Rock	Pulaski	Little Rock Central Area	Biographical	Library and museum of President Bill Clinton
Clover Bend Museum	Black Rock	Lawrence	Arkansas Delta	Local history	website, farmstead exhibits and local history
Crater of Diamonds State Park	Murfreesboro	Pike	Arkansas Timberlands	Geology - Gems	Visitors can sift soil for diamonds, agate, garnet, amethyst, and other gems
Cross County Museum	Wynne	Cross	Arkansas Delta	Local history	website, operated by the Cross County Historical Society
Crystal Bridges Museum of American Art	Bentonville	Benton	The Ozarks	Art	Features American art from the Colonial era to contemporary work
Dallas County Museum	Fordyce	Dallas	Arkansas Timberlands	Local history	website Exhibits of Dallas County history along with an archives room and a searchable collection of nearly 25,000 negatives from the Alexander Studios. The new Sports Museum is located across the street and from April 22-June 3, 2017 will house the traveling Smithsonian exhibit Hometown Teams:How Sports Shape America.
Daisy Airgun Museum	Rogers	Benton	The Ozarks	Commodity - Airguns	website, vintage products and artifacts of the Daisy company
Darby House	Fort Smith	Sebastian	Arkansas River Valley Region	Biographical	Home of World War II General William Orlando Darby
Delta Cultural Center	Helena	Phillips	Arkansas Delta	History	Local history, culture, music, railroads
Delta Rivers Nature Center	Pine Bluff	Jefferson	Arkansas Delta	Nature center	website, natural history of the Arkansas River Delta, located in Pine Bluff Regional Park, 130 acres with trails
Delta Gateway Museum	Blytheville	Mississippi	Arkansas Delta	Local history	website, regional history, industry, agriculture, transportation, geology, natural history, located in the historic Kress Building
Desha County Museum	Dumas	Desha	Arkansas Delta	Open-air	website, includes the museum with period business displays, an 1828 church, a stocked country store, a building with period farm machinery and equipment, and an 1850 log house
Drennen-Scott House	Van Buren	Crawford	Arkansas River Valley Region	Historic house	
Drew County Historical Museum	Monticello	Drew	Arkansas Delta	Local history	Operated by the Drew County Historical Society
Eddie Mae Herron Center	Pocahontas	Randolph	Arkansas Delta	African American	Museum, education, community, heritage and cultural center about African Americans in Randolph County
Ernie's Museum on Black Arkansans	Little Rock	Pulaski	Little Rock Central Area	African American	website, also called EMOBA - The Museum of Black Arkansans and Performing Arts Center, contributions of black Arkansans
ESSE Purse Museum & Store	Little Rock	Pulaski	Little Rock Central Area	Fashion	website, evolution of the 20th-century American woman – decade by decade – through her handbags and the items she carried with her
Eureka Springs Historical Museum	Eureka Springs	Carroll	The Ozarks	Local history	website
Fargo Agricultural School Museum	Fargo	Monroe	Arkansas Delta	History	
Faulkner County Museum	Conway	Faulkner	Little Rock Central Area	Local history	Housed in the former county jail
Fort Smith Air Museum	Fort Smith	Sebastian	Arkansas River Valley Region	Aviation	website, located at Fort Smith Regional Airport, honors pioneer and military aviators from western Arkansas and eastern Oklahoma
Fort Smith Museum of History	Fort Smith	Sebastian	Arkansas River Valley Region	Local history	
Fort Smith National Historic Site	Fort Smith	Sebastian	Arkansas River Valley Region	Military	Fort Smith's military history from 1817–1871
Fort Smith Regional Art Museum	Fort Smith	Sebastian	Arkansas River Valley Region	Art	website, nationally and internationally recognized traveling exhibits
Fort Smith Trolley Museum	Fort Smith	Sebastian	Arkansas River Valley Region	Railroad - Trolley	Heritage streetcars, steam locomotives, railroad equipment, transportation and other technology
Frog Fantasies Museum	Eureka Springs	Carroll	The Ozarks	Commodity	website, collection of frog items and gift shop
Gann Museum	Benton	Saline	Little Rock Central Area	Local history	
Galaxy Collection	Hot Springs	Garland	Ouachita Mountains	Media	website, vintage items related to the Star Wars franchise
Gangster Museum of America	Hot Springs	Garland	Ouachita Mountains	History	website, area history related to organized crime in the 1920s to 1940s
Grant County Museum	Sheridan	Grant	Little Rock Central Area	Local history	website, special exhibits include the Arkansas Louisiana Gas Company Museum, a Civil War Red River Expedition room, automobiles and military vehicles
Gravette Historical Museum	Gravette	Benton	The Ozarks	Local history	Located in the Kindley House
Guitar Museum	Jacksonville	Pulaski	Little Rock Central Area	Music	website, vintage guitars & amps, w/large display of Cowboy Guitars circa 1930s - 1950s
Hampson Archeological Museum State Park	Wilson	Mississippi	Arkansas Delta	Archaeology	Collection of early American aboriginal artifacts from the Nodena site
Headquarters House Museum	Fayetteville	Washington	The Ozarks	Historic house - History	1853 period home, exhibits related to Civil War battle, operated by the Washington County Historical Society
Helena Museum of Phillips County	Helena	Phillips	Arkansas Delta	Local history	Includes local history (social clubs, lumber industry, river port, etc.) and Civil War history. Housed in the oldest civic building in Phillips County and the oldest purpose build museum building in the state.
Hemingway-Pfeiffer Museum and Educational Center	Piggott	Clay	Arkansas Delta	History	Barn-studio associated with author Ernest Hemingway and the family home of his second wife, Pauline Pfeiffer; focus on area life and literature in the 1920s and 1930s
Heritage House Museum of Montgomery County	Mount Ida	Montgomery	Ouachita Mountains	Local history	website
Historic Arkansas Museum	Little Rock	Pulaski	Little Rock Central Area	History	State history
Historic Washington State Park	Washington	Hempstead	Arkansas Timberlands	Open-air	Also known as Old Washington Historic State Park, over 30 historic buildings
Hot Springs National Park	Hot Springs	Garland	Ouachita Mountains	Historic site	Includes early 20th century period Fordyce Bathhouse museum
Howard County Museum	Nashville	Howard	Arkansas Timberlands	Local history	Operated by the Howard County Historical Society
Hunter-Coulter Museum	Ashdown	Little River	Arkansas Timberlands	Local history	
Huntington Jail and Miner Museum	Huntington	Sebastian	Arkansas River Valley Region	Local history	
Jacksonport State Park	Newport	Jackson	Arkansas Timberlands	Multiple	Includes African American History Exhibit, Courthouse Museum, Mary Woods No. 2 Riverboat, freshwater pearling exhibit
Jacksonville Museum of Military History	Jacksonville	Pulaski	Little Rock Central Area	History	website, includes Arkansas military history from the civil war through Iraq, with a special emphasis on Little Rock AFB, plus the Arkansas Ordnance Plant.
Jacob Wolf House	Norfork	Baxter	The Ozarks	Historic house	Oldest public structure in Arkansas, two story log house
Japanese American Internment Museum	McGehee	Desha	Arkansas Delta	Ethnic	History of Japanese American internment at Rohwer War Relocation Center and Jerome War Relocation Center during World War II
Josephine Tussaud Wax Museum	Hot Springs	Garland	Ouachita Mountains	Wax museum	
Klipsch Museum of Audio History	Hope	Hempstead	Arkansas Timberlands	Technology	website, Klipsch Audio Technologies products, test equipment, audio source components, early manufacturing equipment, items from other companies
Lakeport Plantation	Lake Village	Chicot	Arkansas Delta	Historic house	The only remaining Arkansas Antebellum Plantation Home on the Mississippi River; owned and operated by Arkansas State University.
Dyess Colony	Dyess	Mississippi	Arkansas Delta	History	website, history of the New Deal federal agricultural resettlement community, includes boyhood home of singer Johnny Cash
Lepanto Museum	Lepanto	Poinsett	Arkansas Delta	Local history	website
Little Rock Central High School	Little Rock	Pulaski	Little Rock Central Area	History	1955 Little Rock integration crisis and the Civil Rights Movement
Logan County Museum	Paris	Logan	Arkansas River Valley Region	Local history	Housed in a restored jail
Lonoke County Museum	Lonoke	Lonoke	Little Rock Central Area	Civil War	website, dioramas and weapons from the Civil War
Lowell Historical Museum	Lowell	Benton	The Ozarks	Local history	
Lower White River Museum State Park	Des Arc	Prairie	Arkansas Delta	Local history	website, river's influence on area history, industry and agriculture
Lum & Abner Museum & Jot 'Em Down Store	Pine Ridge	Montgomery	Arkansas Timberlands	Media	Memorabilia from Lum & Abner radio show from 1903s and 1940s
MacArthur Museum of Arkansas Military History	Little Rock	Pulaski	Little Rock Central Area	Military	Military history of Arkansas from its territorial period to the present
Mammoth Spring State Park	Mammoth Spring	Fulton	The Ozarks	Railroad	Features early 20th-century period train station, caboose and local history displays
Marked Tree Delta Area Museum	Marked Tree	Poinsett	Arkansas Delta	Local history	Local history, general store and 4 room replication of the old Verser Hospital in Harrisburg, changing exhibits
Mark Martin Museum	Batesville	Independence	The Ozarks	Automobile racing - Biography	website, focuses on Mark Martin's car racing career; attached to his Ford dealership
Maynard Pioneer Museum	Maynard	Randolph	Arkansas Delta	Local history	Historic log cabin and pioneer artifacts
McCollum-Chidester House	Camden	Ouachita	Arkansas Timberlands	Historic house	Operated by the Ouachita County Historical Society, mid 19th-century period house
Mena Depot Center	Mena	Polk	Ouachita Mountains	History	Also known as Kansas City/Southern Historical Railroad Museum
Mid-America Science Museum	Hot Springs	Garland	Ouachita Mountains	Science	Hands-on science exhibits
Miss Laura's Social Club	Fort Smith	Sebastian	Arkansas River Valley Region	History	Restored former bordello and visitor center
The Momentary	Bentonville	Benton	The Ozarks	Contemporary art	
Morrilton Depot Museum	Morrilton	Conway	Little Rock Central Area	Local history	
Mosaic Templars Cultural Center	Little Rock	Pulaski	Little Rock Central Area	Ethnic - African American	African American history, culture and community in Arkansas from 1870 to the present
Museum of American History at Cabot High School	Cabot	Lonoke	Little Rock Central Area	Local history	
Museum of Native American History	Bentonville	Benton	The Ozarks	Native American	Includes tools, weapons, clothing, pottery
Museum of the Arkansas Grand Prairie	Stuttgart	Arkansas	Arkansas Delta	Open-air	website, pioneer and farm life, agriculture, tractors, store displays, collections of antiques, duck calls and decoys, school house, fire house
Museum of Automobiles	Morrilton	Conway	Little Rock Central Area	Transportation - Automobiles	Antique and classic cars
Nevada County Depot and Museum	Prescott	Nevada	Arkansas Timberlands	Local history	Exhibits include area settlers, railroads, military items
New Rocky Comfort Museum	Foreman	Little River	Arkansas Timberlands	Local history	Housed in a former jail
Old Jail Museum	Greenwood	Sebastian	Arkansas River Valley Region	Local history	Operated by the South Sebastian County Historical Society
Old Independence Regional Museum	Batesville	Independence	The Ozarks	Local history	
Old State House Museum	Little Rock	Pulaski	Little Rock Central Area	History	State history and culture
Ozark Depot Museum	Ozark	Franklin	Arkansas River Valley Region	Local history	Local history and railroad memorabilia
Ozark Folk Center	Mountain View	Stone	The Ozarks	Living history	Ozark cultural heritage and tradition, music, crafts
Ozark Heritage Arts Center	Leslie	Searcy	The Ozarks	Multiple	Art gallery, oral histories, music and theatre
Parkin Archeological State Park	Parkin	Cross	Arkansas Delta	Archaeology	
Paris-Logan County Coal Miners Memorial	Paris	Logan	Arkansas River Valley Region	Mining	
Pea Ridge Historical Museum	Pea Ridge	Benton	The Ozarks	Local history	website, operated by the Pea Ridge Historical Society
Pea Ridge National Military Park	Garfield	Benton	The Ozarks	Military	Preserved Civil War battlefield, museum
The Peel Mansion Museum & Heritage Gardens	Bentonville	Benton	The Ozarks	Historic house	1870s period mansion
Pine Bluff/Jefferson County Historical Museum	Pine Bluff	Jefferson	Arkansas Delta	Local history	Located in the former Pine Bluff Union Station
Plantation Agriculture Museum	Scott	Lonoke	Little Rock Central Area	Agriculture	website, cotton agriculture and plantation farming life, operated by the state
Potts Inn Museum	Pottsville	Pope	The Ozarks	Historic house	1850s home and stagecoach station on the Butterfield Overland mail route
Powhatan Historic State Park	Powhatan	Lawrence	Arkansas Delta	History	Features the 1888 Powhatan courthouse which served as the home of county government from 1888-1963, other historic structures
Prairie Grove Battlefield State Park	Prairie Grove	Washington	The Ozarks	Military - Civil War	1862 battle site and museum about the Battle of Prairie Grove
President William Jefferson Clinton Birthplace Home National Historic Site	Hope	Hempstead	Arkansas Timberlands	Historic house - Biographical	Birthplace home of President Bill Clinton
Quigley's Castle	Eureka Springs	Carroll	The Ozarks	Historic house	Mid 20th-century house covered in small stones
Randolph County Heritage Museum	Pocahontas	Randolph	Arkansas Delta	Local history	website, historic artifacts, folk art, archaeological artifacts recovered from the site of the town of Davidsonville, Arksansas
Rector Community Museum	Rector	Clay	Arkansas Delta	Local history	website, historic items that have a connection to the area of the Rector School District.
Ridge House	Fayetteville	Washington	The Ozarks	Historic house	Tours by the Washington County Historical Society
Rogers Historical Museum	Rogers	Benton	The Ozarks	History	website
Saunders Memorial Museum	Berryville	Carroll	The Ozarks	Commodity	website, firearms, knives, Victorian clothing, accessories, textiles and furniture
Scott Family Amazeum	Bentonville	Benton	The Ozarks	Children's, science	website, hands-on interactive museum for children of all ages and their families
Scott County Museum of History	Waldron	Scott	Ouachita Mountains	Local history	website, county history museum includes Native American artifacts, firearms, weapons, coins in historic Scott County Courthouse
Sevier County Historical Society Museum	De Queen	Sevier	Arkansas Timberlands	Local history	
Shiloh Museum of Ozark History	Springdale	Washington	The Ozarks	History	Ozark and Northwest Arkansas history
Siloam Springs Museum	Siloam Springs	Benton	The Ozarks	History	website
South Arkansas Historical Preservation Society- Gallery of History	El Dorado	Union	Arkansas Timberlands	History	https://www.soarkhistory.com
South Arkansas Arts Center	El Dorado	Union	Arkansas Timberlands	Art	website
Southern Tenant Farmers Museum	Tyronza	Poinsett	Arkansas Delta	Agriculture	website
Stephens Art Gallery	Clarksville	Johnson	Arkansas River Valley Region	Art	website, part of the Walton Fine Arts Center at the University of the Ozarks
St. Francis County Museum	Forrest City	St. Francis	Arkansas Delta	Local history	
Stone County Historical Society Museum	Mountain View	Stone	The Ozarks	Local history	website
Toltec Mounds Archeological State Park	Scott	Lonoke	Little Rock Central Area	Archaeology - Native American	18-mound complex with the tallest surviving prehistoric mounds in Arkansas, museum of artifacts
Tontitown Historical Museum	Tontitown	Washington	The Ozarks	History	website
Turner Neal Museum of Natural History	Monticello	Drew	Arkansas Delta	Natural history	website, part of the University of Arkansas at Monticello, also Pomeroy Planetarium
Two Rivers Museum	Ashdown	Little River	Arkansas Timberlands	Local history	
University Museum and Cultural Center	Pine Bluff	Jefferson	Arkansas Delta	History	History of the University of Arkansas at Pine Bluff and the Arkansas Delta region
U.S. Marshals Service National Museum	Fort Smith	Sebastian	Arkansas River Valley Region	Military	website, planned museum about the U.S. Marshals Service
Van Buren County Historical Society Museum	Clinton	Van Buren	The Ozarks	Local history	website
Walmart Museum	Bentonville	Benton	The Ozarks	Historic store	website, original store opened by Sam Walton, company history
White River National Wildlife Refuge	DeWitt	Arkansas	Arkansas Delta	Natural history	
Wings of Honor Museum	Walnut Ridge	Lawrence	Arkansas Delta	Local History, Military	website, History of Walnut Ridge Army Flying School and wars

== Defunct museums ==
- The Band Museum, Pine Bluff, closed in 2010, former website
- Baxter County Heritage Museum, Gassville, closed in 2008 and sold to a private individual
- Blythe's Scott County Museum, closed and donated collection to Scott County Museum of History in 2021
- Gallery Mint Museum, Eureka Springs
- Marine Corps Legacy Museum, Harrison, closed in 2010
- Museum of Chicot County Arkansas, Lake Village, closed in 2014
- Museum of Earth History, Eureka Springs, moved to Dallas, Texas

== See also ==
- List of historical societies in Arkansas
- List of nature centers in Arkansas

== Regions of Arkansas ==
- Arkansas Delta - eastern and southeastern sections of the state
- Arkansas River Valley Region
- Arkansas Timberlands - also called Southern Arkansas, Southwestern Arkansas or West Gulf Coastal Plain
- Little Rock Central Area - Pulaski, Faulkner, Saline, Lonoke, Perry and Grant County
- Ouachita Mountains - area around the mountain range located in west central Arkansas
- The Ozarks - highland region of northwest and north central Arkansas
