= List of the oldest buildings in Arkansas =

This article lists the oldest extant buildings in Arkansas, including extant buildings and structures constructed prior to and during the United States rule over Arkansas. Only buildings built prior to 1840 are suitable for inclusion on this list, or the building must be the oldest of its type.

In order to qualify for the list, a structure must:

- be a recognizable building (defined as any human-made structure used or intended for supporting or sheltering any use or continuous occupancy);
- incorporate features of building work from the claimed date to at least 1.5 metres (4.9 ft) in height and/or be a listed building.

This consciously excludes ruins of limited height, roads and statues. Bridges may be included if they otherwise fulfill the above criteria. Dates for many of the oldest structures have been arrived at by radiocarbon dating or dendrochronology and should be considered approximate. If the exact year of initial construction is estimated, it will be shown as a range of dates.

== List of oldest buildings ==
Building	Image	Location	First built	Use	Notes
(Old) St. Mary Church		Sherrill, Arkansas	1782	Church	Built on a barge at Arkansas Post. Relocated in 1832, and again to current location in 1869 where the wooden structure was overlaid with brick in 1927.
Albert Pike School		Van Buren, Arkansas	1820s	School	School where Albert Pike taught; it was moved and is now on the grounds of the Crawford County Courthouse
Ten Mile House		Little Rock, Arkansas	ca. 1825–1836	Residence	
Estevan Hall		Helena, Arkansas	1826	Residence	
Morrow Farmstead		Morrow, Arkansas	1828	Residence	
Rice-Upshaw House		near Dalton, Arkansas	1828	Residence	Squared log structure
Jesse Hinderliter House		Little Rock, Arkansas	ca. 1828–1831	Residence/ Tavern	
Jacob Wolf House		between Norfolk, Arkansas and Mountain Home, Arkansas	1829	Residence/ Government Building	Oldest public building in Arkansas started as a house before becoming a County seat building; Squared log house.
Hudson-Grace-Borreson House		Pine Bluff, Arkansas	1830	Residence	
Plummer's Station		Conway County, Arkansas	1830	Residence	
Block-Catts House		Washington, Arkansas	1832	Residence	
Williams Tavern Restaurant		Washington, Arkansas	1832	Residence/ Tavern	
Grandison D. Royston House		Washington, Arkansas	1833	Residence	
Elkhorn Tavern		Pea Ridge, Arkansas	1833/1865	Residence	Used as a Civil War hospital; Burned and rebuilt with original foundation/chimney in 1865
Looney–French House		Dalton, Arkansas	1833	Residences	Squared log house
Old State House (Little Rock, Arkansas)		Little Rock, Arkansas	1833–1842	Government	The oldest surviving state capitol building west of the Mississippi River.
Methodist Manse		Cane Hill, Arkansas	1834	Church/ Residence	Disputed by recent evidence
Tom Smith House		Washington County, Arkansas	1834	Residence	
Ashley-Alexander House		Scott, Arkansas	1835	Residence	
Royston Log House		Washington State Park	1835	Residence	
Peeler Gap Road House		Danville, Arkansas	1835	Residence	
Barnett-Attwood House		Cleveland County, Arkansas	ca. 1835–1836	Residence	
Confederate State Capitol Building		Washington, Arkansas	1836	Residence	
Drennen-Scott House		Van Buren, Arkansas	1836	Residence	
Hester-Lenz House		Benton, Arkansas	1836	Residence	
Ridge House		Fayetteville, Arkansas	1836	Residence	
Simon Sager Cabin		Siloam Springs, Arkansas	1837	Residence	
Hudson-Jones House		Clark County, Arkansas	1837	Residence	
Wilhauf House		Van Buren, Arkansas	1837	Residence	
William Dillard Homestead		Stone County, Arkansas	1837	Residence	
Fort Smith Old Commissary		Fort Smith, Arkansas	1838	Residence	
Maguire-Williams House		Washington County, Arkansas	1838	Residence	
Absalom Fowler House		Little Rock, Arkansas	1840	Residence	
Joel Smith House		El Dorado, Arkansas	1840	Residence	
Pike–Fletcher–Terry House		Little Rock, Arkansas	1840	Residence	
Smyrna Methodist Church		near Searcy, Arkansas	1854	Church	Oldest church built in Arkansas

== See also ==
- National Register of Historic Places listings in Arkansas
- History of Arkansas
- Oldest buildings in the United States
