= Floyd Brown (disambiguation) =

Floyd Brown (born 1961) is an American author, speaker, and media commentator.

Floyd Brown may also refer to:

- Floyd Brown (athlete) (born 1957), Jamaican sprinter
- Floyd L. Brown (1888–1971), American college football player and coach
- Floyd B. Brown, American educator, owner of the historic Floyd B. Brown House
