= Floyd B. Brown House =

Historic house in Arkansas, United States

- Formerly listed on the U.S. National Register of Historic Places
- Location within Arkansas Location within the United States
- Location: 1401 S. Georgia St., Pine Bluff, Arkansas
- Coordinates: 34°13′2″N 92°0′0″W
- Area: less than one acre
- Built: 1955
- Architectural style: Minimal Traditional
- NRHP reference No.: 04001493

Significant dates
- Added to NRHP: January 19, 2006
- Removed from NRHP: January 26, 2018

The Floyd B. Brown House is a historic house at 1401 South Georgia Street in Pine Bluff, Arkansas. It is a single-story vernacular brick structure, with a gable roof and brick foundation. Decorative elements on the building are minimal, with scalloped trim elements at the gables and eaves, and a fanlight in the front-facing gable. The house was built in 1954 for Floyd and Lillian Brown. The Browns were prominent African-American educators: Floyd Brown founded the Fargo Training School in Fargo, Arkansas, and his wife Lillian taught there.

The house was listed on the National Register of Historic Places in 2006. It was delisted in 2018.

== See also ==
- National Register of Historic Places listings in Jefferson County, Arkansas
