= Elkins School District (Arkansas) =

School district in Arkansas

Elkins School District Elkins School District

Address
- 349 N. Center Elkins, AR Washington County, Arkansas, Arkansas, 72727; United States

District information
- Type: Public School District
- Grades: K-12
- Established: 1898
- Superintendent: Jeremy Mangrum

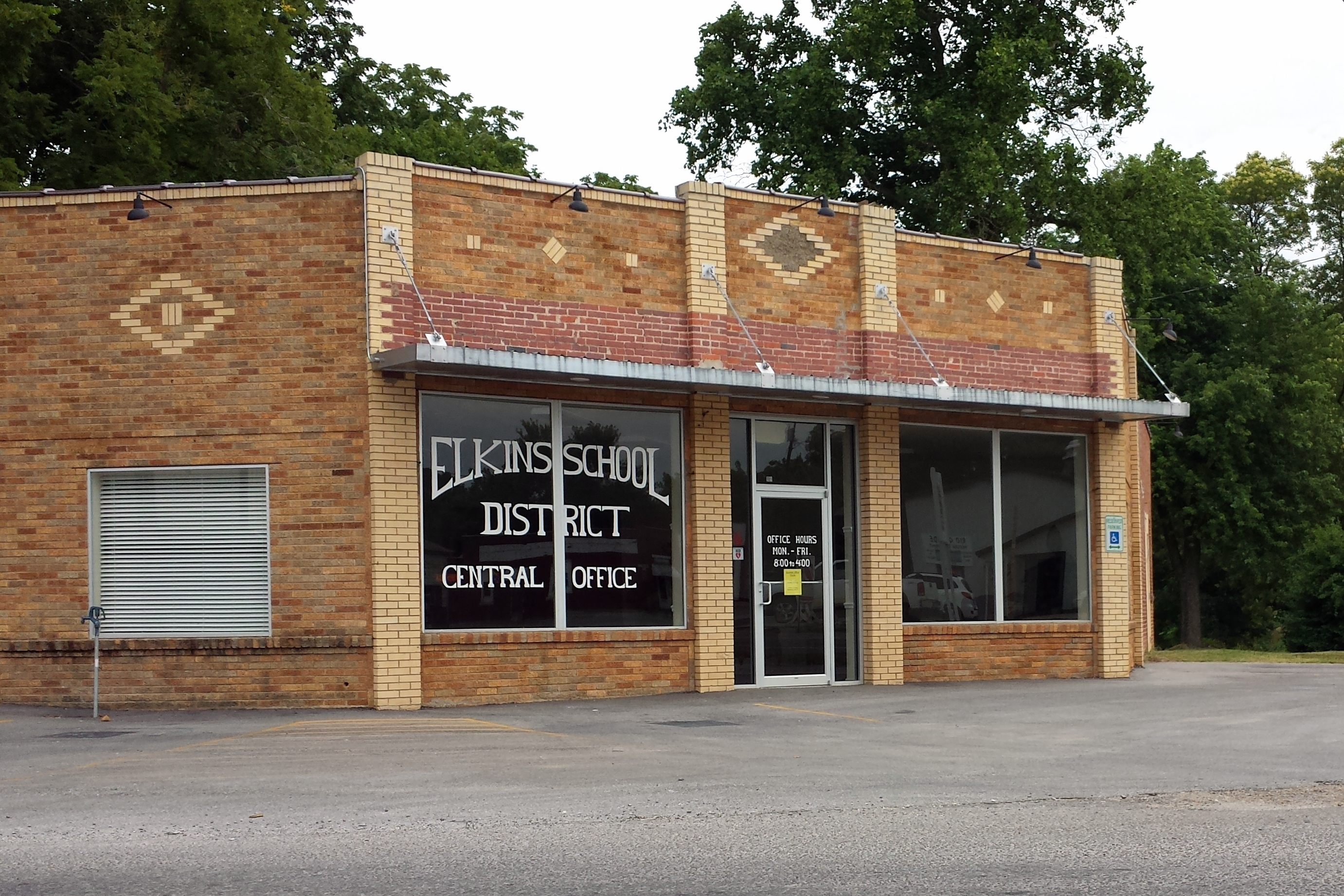
Office for Elkins School District

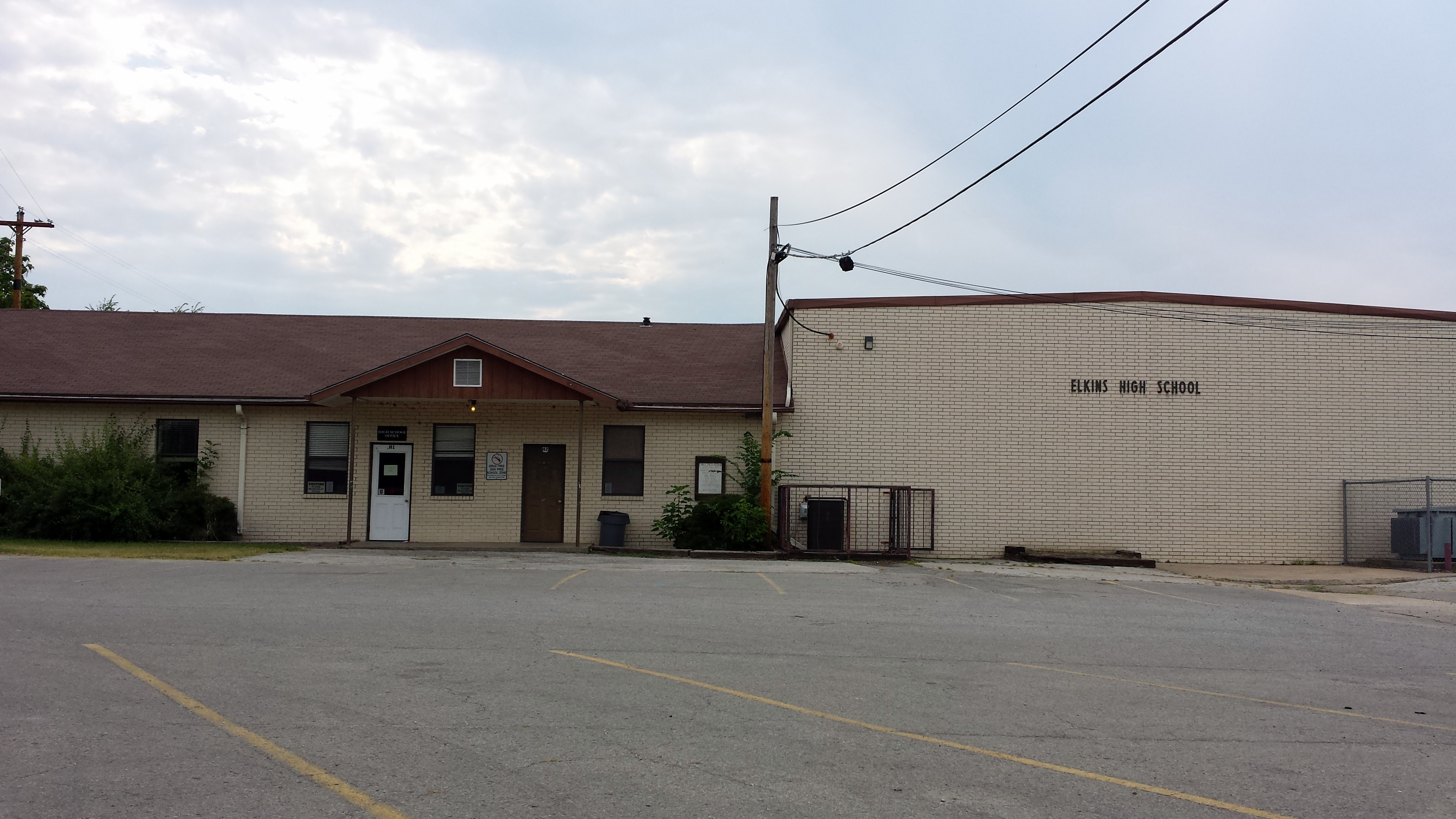
Elkins High School

Elkins School District is a public school district based in Elkins, Arkansas, United States. Established in 1898, the Elkins School District provides early childhood, elementary and secondary education for more than 1,200 kindergarten through grade 12 students at its four facilities.

The district includes the majority of Elkins.

== List of Schools ==
- Elkins High School—grades 9 through 12.
- Elkins Middle School—grades 7 through 8.
- Elkins Elementary School—grades 3 through 6.
- Elkins Elementary Primary School—kindergarten through grade 2.
