= Maguire-Williams House =

Historic house in Arkansas, United States

- U.S. National Register of Historic Places
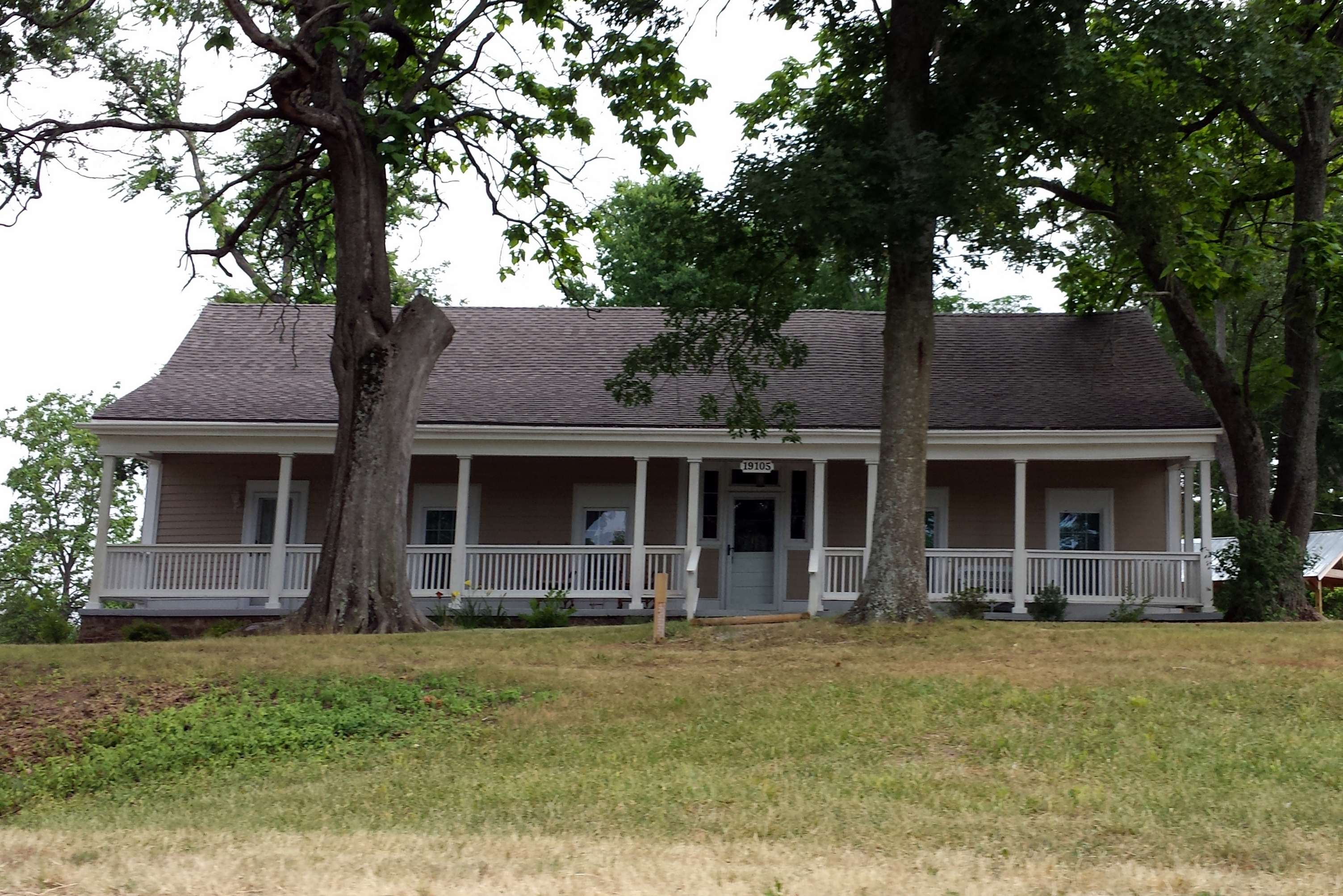

- Location within Arkansas Location within the United States
- Nearest city: Elkins, Arkansas
- Coordinates: 36.02642°N 94.00991°W
- Area: 17 acres (6.9 ha)
- Built: 1838
- NRHP reference No.: 95001093
- Added to NRHP: September 7, 1995

The Maguire-Williams House is a historic house at 19105 Arkansas Highway 74 east of Elkins, Arkansas. It is a 1 1/2-story log and frame structure, finished in wooden clapboards, with a side gable roof. The house appears to have been built between about 1838 and 1877, and includes a frame addition to the rear and an open porch extending across the width of its front. The oldest log pen of the structure has been dated by dendrochronology to c. 1838, with a second wood frame pen, in dog trot layout, added c. 1867. It is one of the county's older antebellum buildings.

The house was listed on the National Register of Historic Places in 1995.

== See also ==
- National Register of Historic Places listings in Washington County, Arkansas
- List of the oldest buildings in Arkansas
