= Smyrna Methodist Church =

Historic church in Arkansas, United States

- U.S. National Register of Historic Places
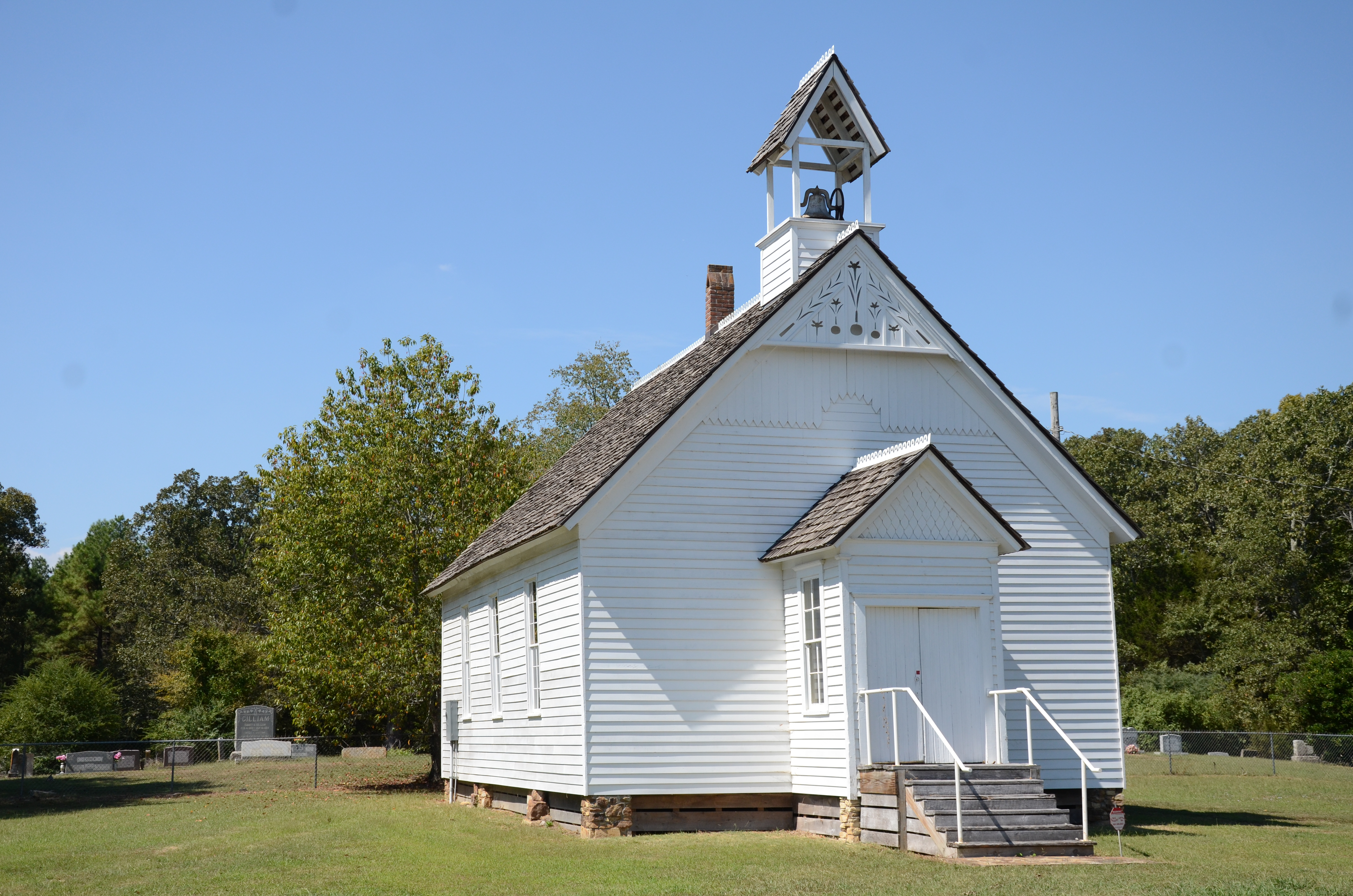

- Location within Arkansas Location within the United States
- Nearest city: Center Hill, Arkansas
- Coordinates: 35°15′8″N 91°51′11″W
- Area: less than one acre
- Built: 1854
- Architectural style: Greek Revival
- MPS: White County MPS
- NRHP reference No.: 91001336
- Added to NRHP: July 20, 1992

Smyrna Methodist Church is a historic church in rural White County, Arkansas. It is located west of Searcy, on Jaybird Lane just south of Arkansas Highway 36. It is a single story wood-frame structure, with a gabled roof, mainly weatherboard siding, and a stone foundation. A small open belfry rises from the roof ridge, topped by a gabled roof. The front facade has a projecting gabled vestibule, its gabled section finished in diamond-cut wooden shingles. The main gable is partly finished in vertical board siding, with decorative vergeboard woodwork attached to the roof edge.

Built in 1854, it is one of White County's few surviving pre-Civil War buildings, and its finest surviving Greek Revival church. Some of the logs used to build the church began growing as trees in the early 1600s.

The church was listed on the National Register of Historic Places in 1992.

== See also ==
- National Register of Historic Places listings in White County, Arkansas
- List of the oldest buildings in Arkansas
