= Tom Smith House =

Historic house in Arkansas, United States

- U.S. National Register of Historic Places
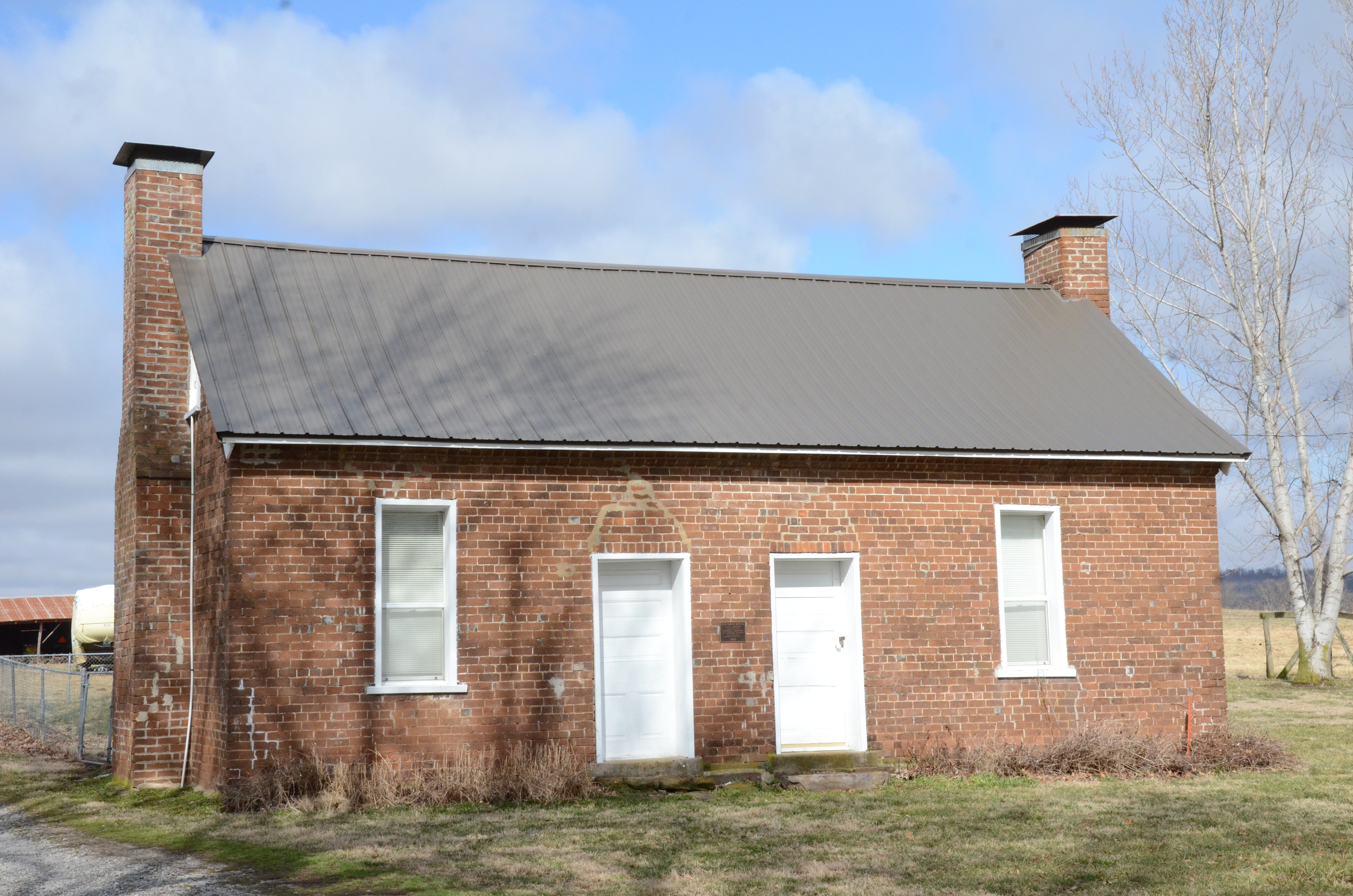
- Nearest city: Elkins, Arkansas
- Area: 33.5 acres (13.6 ha)
- Built: 1834
- Built by: Thomas Smith
- Architectural style: Late Georgian
- NRHP reference No.: 92001344
- Added to NRHP: October 8, 1992

The Tom Smith House is a historic house on Arkansas Highway 74, east of Elkins, Arkansas in Washington County. It is a single-story brick structure, with a side gable roof, end chimneys, and a four-bay front facade. The bricks, which were locally made, are four courses deep, and end in a cornice shaped out of S-shaped molded bricks, an extremely rare detail. The front facade is asymmetrically arranged, with two doors in the center bays and sash windows in the outer bays. Built c. 1834, it is a rare regional example of late Georgian architecture, and is historically significant for its builder, Thomas Smith, who was one of the earliest white settlers of the area. The house stands behind a more recent (c. 1900) frame house on more than 30 acres (12 ha) of land on the north side of AR 74.

The house was listed on the National Register of Historic Places in 1992.

== See also ==
- National Register of Historic Places listings in Washington County, Arkansas
