= Arkansas National Guard Museum =

- Lloyd England Hall
- U.S. National Register of Historic Places
- Location within Arkansas Location within the United States
- Nearest city: North Little Rock, Arkansas
- Coordinates: 34°49′31″N 92°17′13″W
- Area: less than one acre
- Built: 1931
- Architect: Thompson, Sanders, and Ginocchio, R.T. Higgins Co.
- Architectural style: Mission/spanish Revival, Art Deco
- MPS: Thompson, Charles L., Design Collection TR
- NRHP reference No.: 97000403
- Added to NRHP: May 9, 1997

Lloyd England Hall is a historic building at the northwest corner of 6th and Missouri Streets, on the grounds of Camp Joseph T. Robinson, an Arkansas National Guard base in North Little Rock, Arkansas. It is a Spanish Revival structure, designed by the Little Rock architectural firm of Thompson, Sanders, and Ginnochio, and built in 1931, when the facility was known as Camp Pike. It was originally built as an auditorium and meeting hall. The building was listed on the National Register of Historic Places in 1997. From October 1998 to July 1998, the building was renovated at a cost of $300,000 and is now home to the Arkansas National Guard Museum.

== See also ==
- National Register of Historic Places listings in Pulaski County, Arkansas
- List of museums in Arkansas
