= Confederate Last Stand Monument =

Confederate memorial in Little Rock, Arkansas, U.S.

- Interactive map of Confederate Last Stand Monument
- Location: Ten Mile House, Little Rock, Arkansas, U.S.
- Coordinates: 34°41′13″N 92°23′52″W
- Opening date: October 15, 1929
- Dedicated to: Last stand of Confederacy in Arkansas after Battle of Bayou Fourche

The Confederate Last Stand Monument is a Confederate memorial in Little Rock, Arkansas, in the United States.

== History ==
The monument was dedicated October 15, 1929, and rededicated on September 14, 2013, after being relocated slightly to its current location due to roadbuilding.

== See also ==
- List of Confederate monuments and memorials
