= Hudson-Jones House =

Historic house in Arkansas, United States

- U.S. National Register of Historic Places
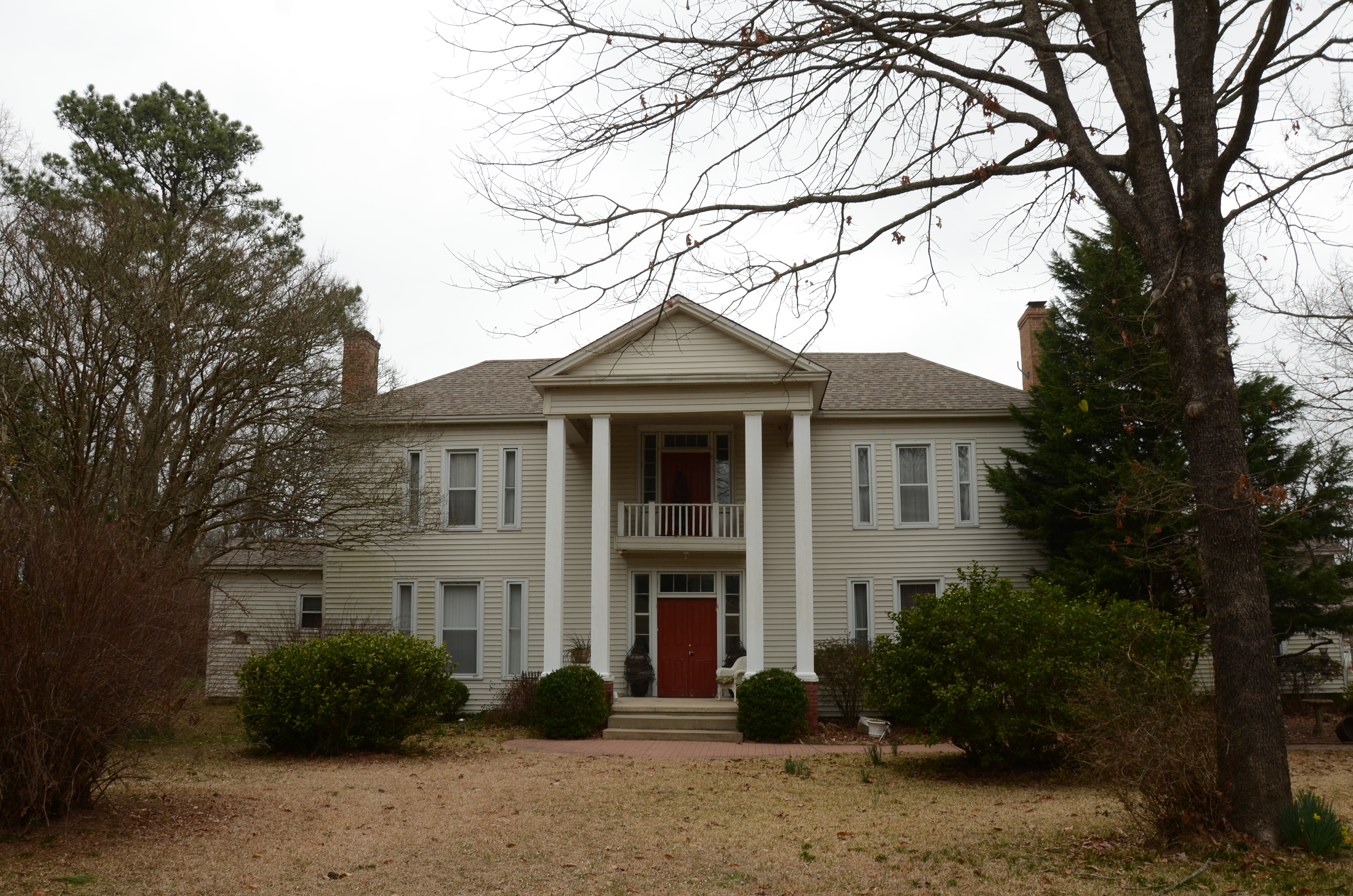

- Location within Arkansas Location within the United States
- Nearest city: Arkadelphia, Arkansas
- Coordinates: 34.06645°N 92.9383°W
- Area: 11.8 acres (4.8 ha)
- Built: 1837
- Architectural style: Greek Revival
- NRHP reference No.: 82002096
- Added to NRHP: September 30, 1982

The Hudson-Jones House is a historic house in rural Clark County, Arkansas. It is located on County Road 68, north of its junction with County Road 34, about 10 miles (16 km) east of Arkadelphia, on a 12-acre (4.9 ha) parcel of farmland. It is a handsome Greek Revival structure, 2 1/2 stories tall, with a single-story addition to the rear. Its most distinctive feature is a full Greek Revival portico with triangular pediment, supported by paired columns. The house was built c. 1840, and survives with most of its outbuildings intact.

The house was listed on the National Register of Historic Places in 1982.

== See also ==
- National Register of Historic Places listings in Clark County, Arkansas
- List of the oldest buildings in Arkansas
