= Danny Patrick (politician) =

American politician

Danny Lee Patrick

Arkansas State Representative for Madison and Carroll counties
- In office January 1967 – January 1971
- Preceded by: Ralph R. Buck
- Succeeded by: Stephen A. Smith

Personal details
- Born: July 8, 1941 Delaney, Madison County, Arkansas, US
- Died: July 26, 2009 (aged 68) Springdale, Arkansas, US
- Resting place: Patrick Cemetery in Madison County
- Party: Republican
- Education: University of Arkansas
- Occupation: Educator; farmer

Danny Lee Patrick (July 8, 1941 – July 26, 2009) was an educator and farmer from rural Delaney in Madison County, Arkansas, who served from 1967 to 1970 as a Republican member of the Arkansas House of Representatives for Madison and neighboring Carroll counties in the northwestern corner of his state. His legislative service coincided exactly with the administration of Winthrop Rockefeller, Arkansas' first GOP governor since Reconstruction.

Like Rockefeller, Patrick was unseated in his bid for a third term in the general election held on November 3, 1970. The Democrats, led by gubernatorial nominee and, later, U.S. Senator Dale Bumpers, wiped out the gains that Republicans had temporarily achieved during the Rockefeller years.

== Political life ==
Patrick was one of two sons born to Dan Ervin Patrick (1912–1971) and the former Audie M. Van Brunt (1916–1997) in the unincorporated community of Delaney near the county seat of Huntsville in Madison County.

Orval Eugene Faubus, the governor from 1955 to 1967, was another Madison County native. Patrick was friendly with both Rockefeller and Faubus, who were opposing major party candidates in the gubernatorial general election held on November 3, 1964, at the same time that Republican U.S. Senator Barry M. Goldwater of Arizona waged his unsuccessful challenge to U.S. President Lyndon B. Johnson. Patrick frequently attended meetings in the Arkansas State Capitol in Little Rock and at the wealthy Rockefeller's exclusive estate, WinRock Farms, in nearby Morrilton in Conway County. Though he developed a good relationship with Rockefeller, Patrick had known Faubus since Patrick was a young boy: "I loved him", he said of Faubus, who died in 1994, in a 2007 interview. In 1981, Patrick was among those who supported Republican Governor Frank D. White's decision to appoint Faubus to head the Arkansas Veterans Affairs Department. Numerous Moderate Republicans, who had formerly identified with Rockefeller, including Leona Troxell of White County, opposed the Faubus selection.

To win his state House seat, Patrick defeated in both 1966 and 1968 the Democrat F. A. "Pat" Teague (1904–1975), a turkey farmer from Berryville in Carroll County in the newly formed District 2 for Madison and Carroll counties. The previous incumbent for Carroll County, Teague, who formerly called himself a "Faubus Republican", was sixty-two years old in the 1966 race against the 25-year-old Patrick. Before he switched to Democrat affiliation, Teague had been an Arkansas delegate to the 1952 Republican National Convention, which met in Chicago, Illinois, to nominate the Eisenhower-Nixon ticket. Arkansans, however, voted for the Stevenson-Sparkman slate of presidential electors. The first Republican representative elected in Madison and Carroll counties, Patrick defeated Teague by thirty-three votes in 1966 and by some three hundred ballots in 1968. In 1970, when Rockefeller dropped below 40 percent in his bid for a third term, Patrick, then twenty-nine, was toppled by the Democrat Stephen A. Smith (born 1949), who polled 54 percent of the vote.

In 1966, Patrick became the youngest person ever elected to the Arkansas legislature, one of only three Republicans in the Arkansas House during Rockefeller's first term; there were ninety-seven Democrats. Four years later, 21-year-old Stephen Smith not only unseated Patrick but took the "youngest-legislator" designation for himself. In the campaign, Smith had questioned Patrick for having been "absent or not voting" on 263 recorded roll calls during the past legislative session. Smith later explained that this issue was "a cheap shot, but an effective one. [His voting record] was probably about average for all legislators, and most of the [missed] votes were on minor amendments or budget bills that had passed without opposition." Smith estimated that the Rockefeller-backed Patrick outspent him possibly as much as 80–1.

== Educator ==
Patrick obtained three degrees from the University of Arkansas at Fayetteville, bachelor's, master's, and specialist, all in professional education. From 1964 to 1971, he was a science teacher and basketball coach in Huntsville. He had remained in teaching while serving in the legislature through generous leave permitted by the school district. From 1971 to 1987, Patrick was the superintendent of the small St. Paul School in southwestern Madison County.

On leaving the superintendency, Patrick for two years directed truck driving instruction at Northwest Technical Institute in Springdale, Arkansas. The institute provides trained drivers for such firms as the Arkansas-based J. B. Hunt Company.

From 1989 until his retirement from public education in 1996, Patrick was superintendent for the Winslow School District in Washington County. The Winslow district was consolidated with Greenland schools in 2004 and renamed the "Greenland School District". In 2005, Patrick was handily elected to the board of the a combined seven-member school board created by the consolidation of the St. Paul and Huntsville schools. Arkansans elect school boards on a nonpartisan basis. He also served on the Washington and Madison County Drug Court Advisory Board.

== Private life ==
Patrick operated a tax preparation business from his home in Delaney. With his son and brother, both named Jerry, Patrick planted considerable acreage in Madison County off Arkansas Highway 16, near Elkins in Washington County. He was an avid camper and a piano player of rock and roll.

Apart from his son, Jerry Lee Patrick (born 1966), Patrick had a daughter, Tonya Lucille Patrick Taylor, from his first marriage to Katherine O'Neal "Kathy" Patrick, from whom he was divorced. Tonya and her husband, Warner H. Taylor (born 1953), are Fayetteville attorneys.

Patrick died on July 26, 2009. He is interred at Patrick Cemetery in Madison County.

| Preceded by Ralph R. Buck | Arkansas State Representative for Madison and Carroll counties); 1967–1970 | Succeeded by Stephen A. Smith |
