= Drennen-Scott House =

Historic house in Arkansas, United States

- U.S. National Register of Historic Places
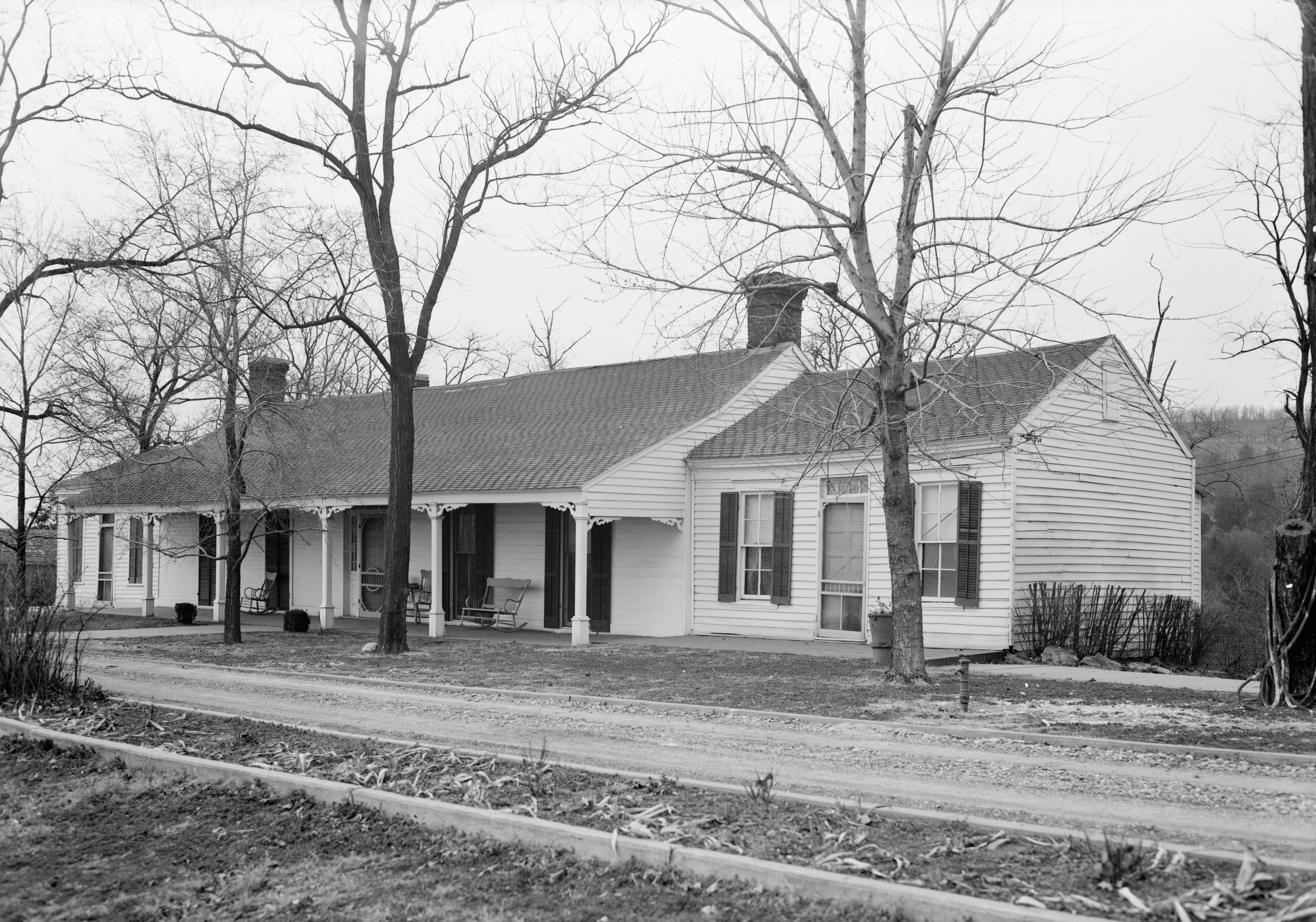

- Location within Arkansas Location within the United States
- Location: Drennen Reserve, N. 3rd St., Van Buren, Arkansas
- Coordinates: 35°26′10″N 94°21′17″W
- Area: less than one acre
- Built: 1836
- NRHP reference No.: 71000123
- Added to NRHP: September 10, 1971

The Drennen-Scott House is a historic house museum on North 3rd Street in Van Buren, Arkansas. It is a single-story log structure, finished in clapboards, with a side-gable roof that has a slight bell-cast shape due to the projection of the roof over the front porch that extends across the width of its main block. The house was built in 1836 by John Drennen, one of Van Buren's first settlers. Drennen and his brother-in-law David Thompson were responsible for platting the town, and Drennen was politically active, serving in the territorial and state legislatures, and at the state constitutional convention. The house remained in the hands of Drennen descendants until it was acquired by the University of Arkansas at Fort Smith, which operates it as a house museum.

The house was listed on the National Register of Historic Places in 1971.

== See also ==
- National Register of Historic Places listings in Crawford County, Arkansas
- List of the oldest buildings in Arkansas
