= Elkins High School (Arkansas) =

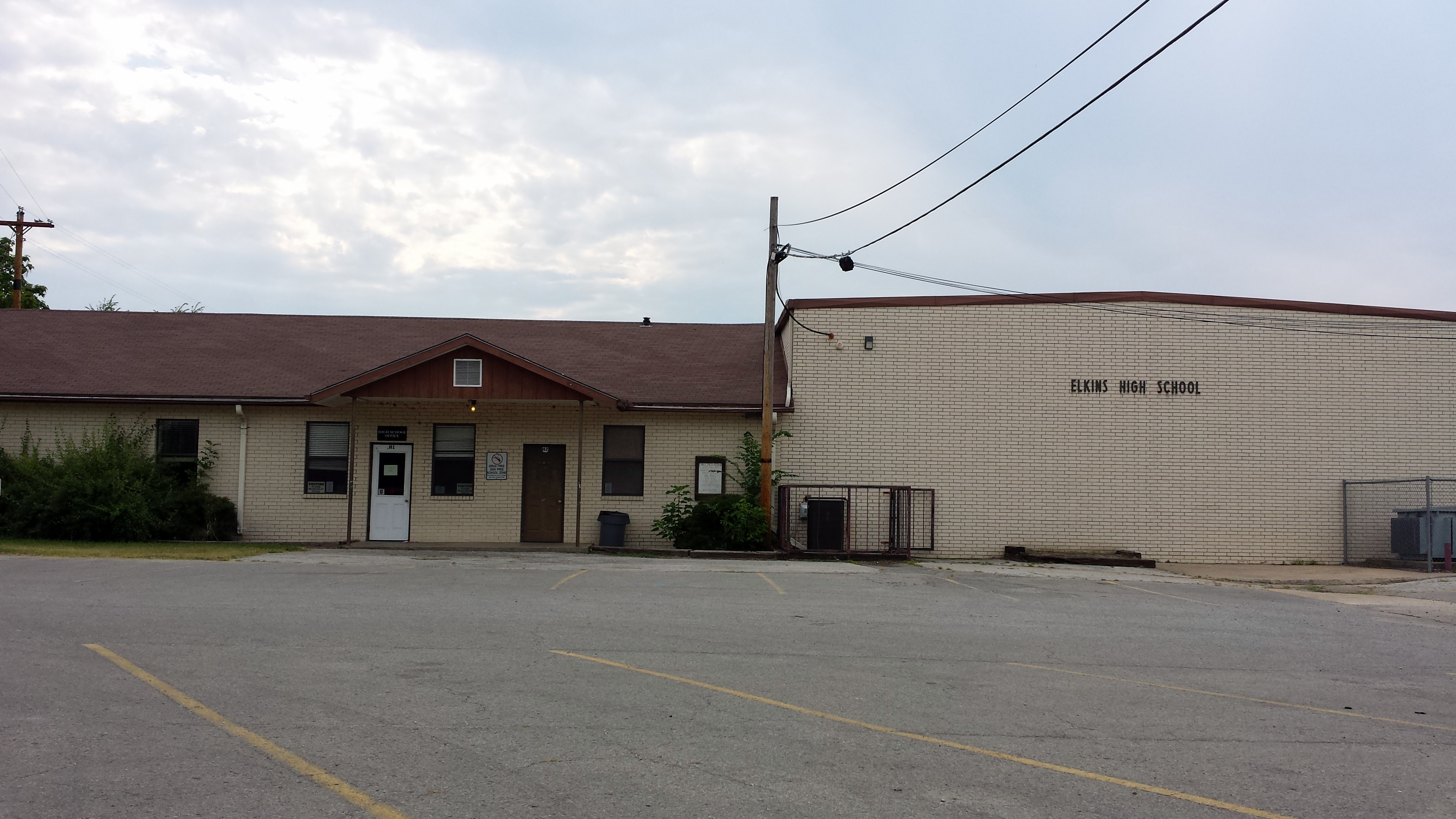

Location
- 700 School Street; Elkins, Arkansas 72411; United States; 36°0′14″N 94°0′36″W

Information
- School type: Public comprehensive
- Motto: Committed to Excellence
- Status: Open
- School district: Elkins School District
- CEEB code: 040705
- NCES School ID: 050576000290
- Teaching staff: 48.94 (on FTE basis)
- Grades: 9–12
- Enrollment: 435 (2023-2024)
- Student to teacher ratio: 8.89
- Education system: ADE Smart Core
- Classes offered: Regular; Career Focus; Advanced Placement (AP)
- Colors: Purple and white
- Athletics conference: 4A Region 1 (2020–present)
- Mascot: Elk
- Team name: Elkins Elks
- Accreditation: ADE; AdvancED (1997–)
- Affiliation: Arkansas Activities Association
- Website: www.elkinsdistrict.org/page/high-school

Elkins High School is an accredited comprehensive public high school located in Elkins, Arkansas, United States. The school provides secondary education for students in grades 9 through 12. It is one of ten public high schools in Washington County, Arkansas and the sole high school administered by the Elkins School District.

The high school's attendance boundary includes the majority of Elkins.

== History ==
The current building was first constructed in the 1950s. Some of the older features of the building is a long east-west hallway, which was created after the building was extended to enclose one side, and the resulting low, sharply angled roof. The last significant architectural addition was in 1990. In May 2009, the Board voted to begin negotiations with an architecture firm to build a new school.

== Academics ==
The assumed course of study follows the Smart Core curriculum developed by the Arkansas Department of Education (ADE), which requires students complete at least 22 units prior to graduation. Students complete regular coursework and exams and may take Advanced Placement (AP) courses and exam with the opportunity to receive college credit. Elkins High School is accredited by the ADE.

== Athletics ==
The Elkins High School mascot is the Elk with purple and white serving as the school colors.

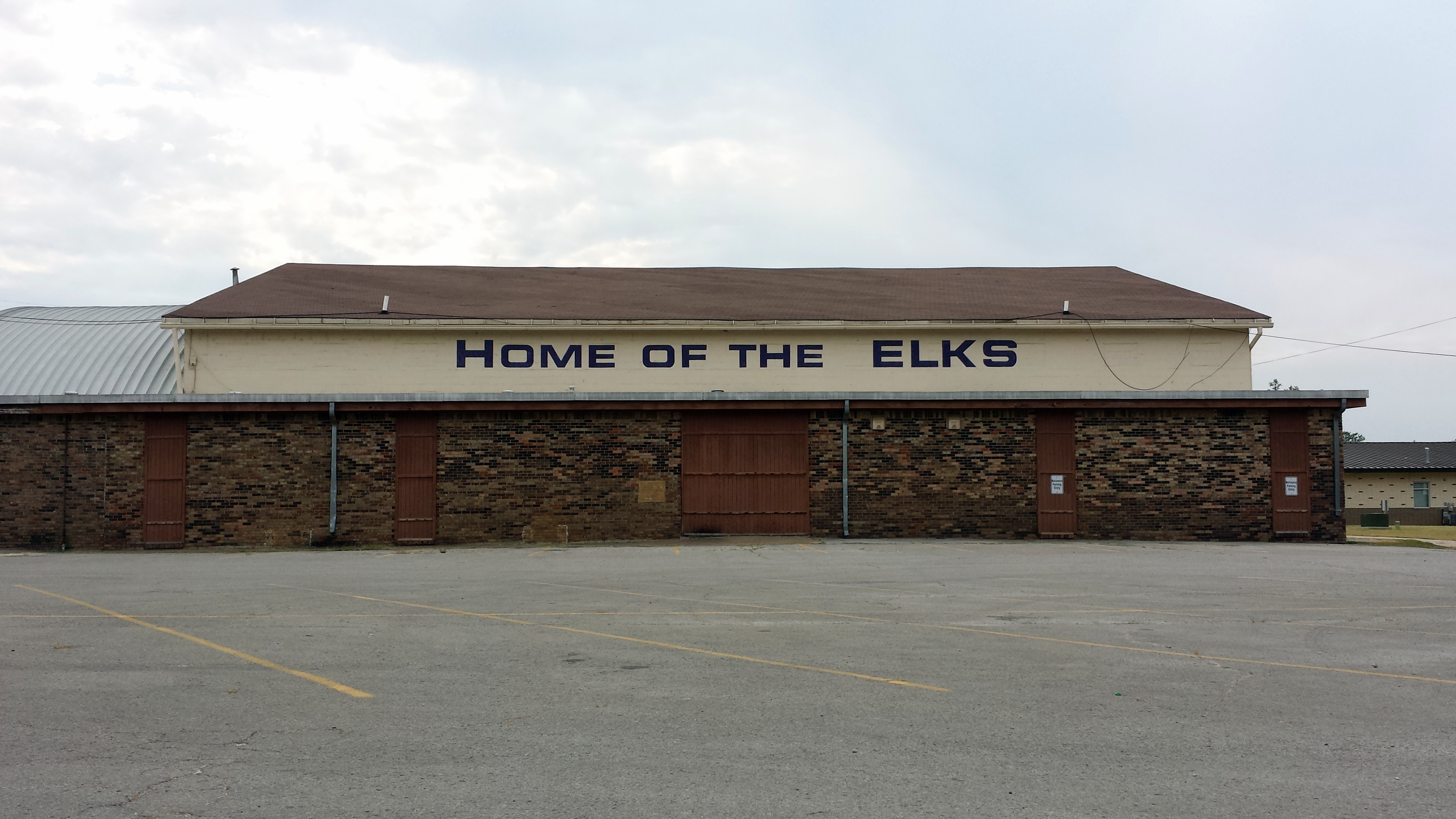
North end of Elkins High School

The Elkins Elks compete in interscholastic activities within the 4A Classification and within the 4A Region 1 Conference administered by the Arkansas Activities Association. The Elks field teams in baseball, basketball (boys/girls), bowling (boys/girls), cheer, cross country, esports, football, golf (boys/girls), softball, swim, tennis (boys/girls), track (boys/girls), and volleyball.

- Football: Elkins won its first state championship in 2025, defeating Dardanelle in the Class 4A title game, 31-14. Coach Zach Watson has established an elite program since taking over in 2021, compiling a record of 59-8. The Elks have won four straight 4A-1 league titles.
- Cross country: The boys cross country teams won six consecutive state titles (2008, 2009, 2010, 2011, 2012, 2013). The girls cross country teams won consecutive state cross country championships in 2008 and 2009.
- Cheerleading: The competitive cheer squads won 4 consecutive Class 3A state cheer championships from 2011 to 2014.
- Baseball: The Elks baseball squad has won 2 state titles, both in Class 3A, in 2006 and in 2009 with a state runner-up in 2011.
