= Simon Sager Cabin =

Historic cabin in Siloam Springs, Arkansas, US

- U.S. National Register of Historic Places
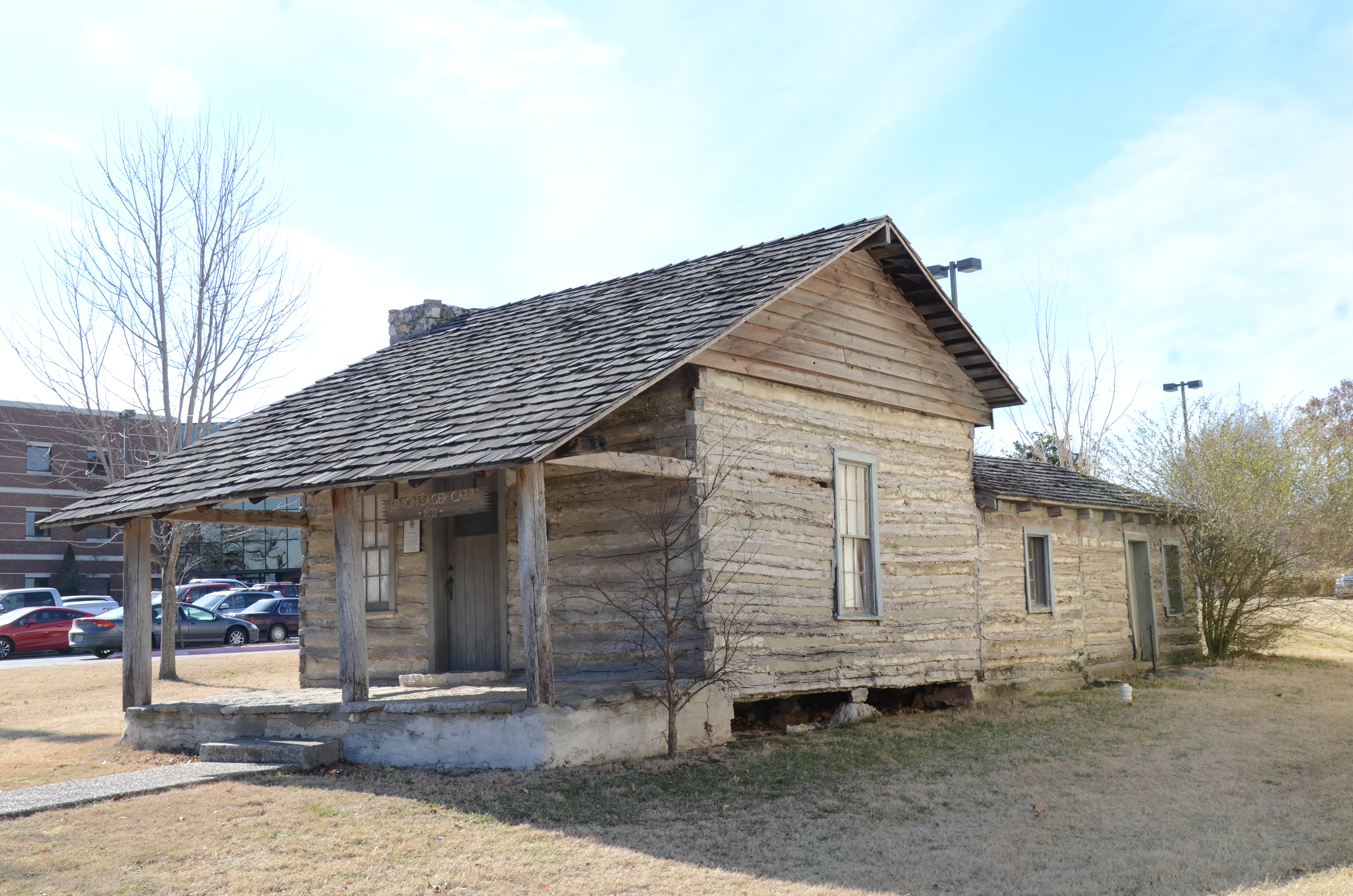

- Location within Arkansas Location within the United States
- Location: John Brown University campus, Siloam Springs, Arkansas
- Coordinates: 36°11′28″N 94°33′30″W
- Area: 1 acre (0.40 ha)
- Built: 1835
- Built by: Simon Sager
- NRHP reference No.: 76000386
- Added to NRHP: January 30, 1976

The Simon Sager Cabin is a historic log cabin on the campus of John Brown University in Siloam Springs, Arkansas. It is the oldest permanent structure in Siloam Springs. The cabin was listed on the National Register of Historic Places in 1976.

== History ==
Simon Sager and his wife Wilhemina Meyers Sager were Germans who immigrated to the United States from Prussia in 1836. After living in Missouri, they moved to Hico, which is now part of Siloam Springs. Sager built this cabin, his second in Hico, in 1844, and made a living as a farmer, rancher, and cabinet maker.

In 1851, Sager sold the home to John DeArmond and moved a few miles away. Sager was not a soldier on either side of the American Civil War but in 1862, at the age of 62, he was killed by Cherokee people who belonged to the pro-Union Keetoowah Society (called "Pin" Indians). Union soldiers burned most buildings in Northwest Arkansas at the end of the war, but this cabin survived because DeArmand was a Union soldier.

== Features ==
The cabin is a single-story, two-room structure made with hand-hewn logs that have been squared and chamfered, and joined by notches, with the gaps filled by limestone chinking. A tree-ring specialist from the University of Arkansas, Dr. David Stahle, found that the logs that made this cabin were from a tree that was a sapling in 1730.

Its original location was north of the John Brown University campus and north of Sager Creek, between Sager Creek and Villa View Road. When John E. Brown deeded his farm to Southwestern Collegiate Institute (now John Brown University) in 1919, the cabin had already been moved to its current location. For many years, it was used as housing for staff members.

By 1961, the building was in disrepair. Maggie Aldridge Smith (a descendent of Sager) wrote a book titled Siloam Souvenir: Simon Sager Memorial and sold copies for $1 each to raise funds for the cabin renovation. It was restored in 1965, and placed on the National Register of Historic Places in 1976.

== Images ==
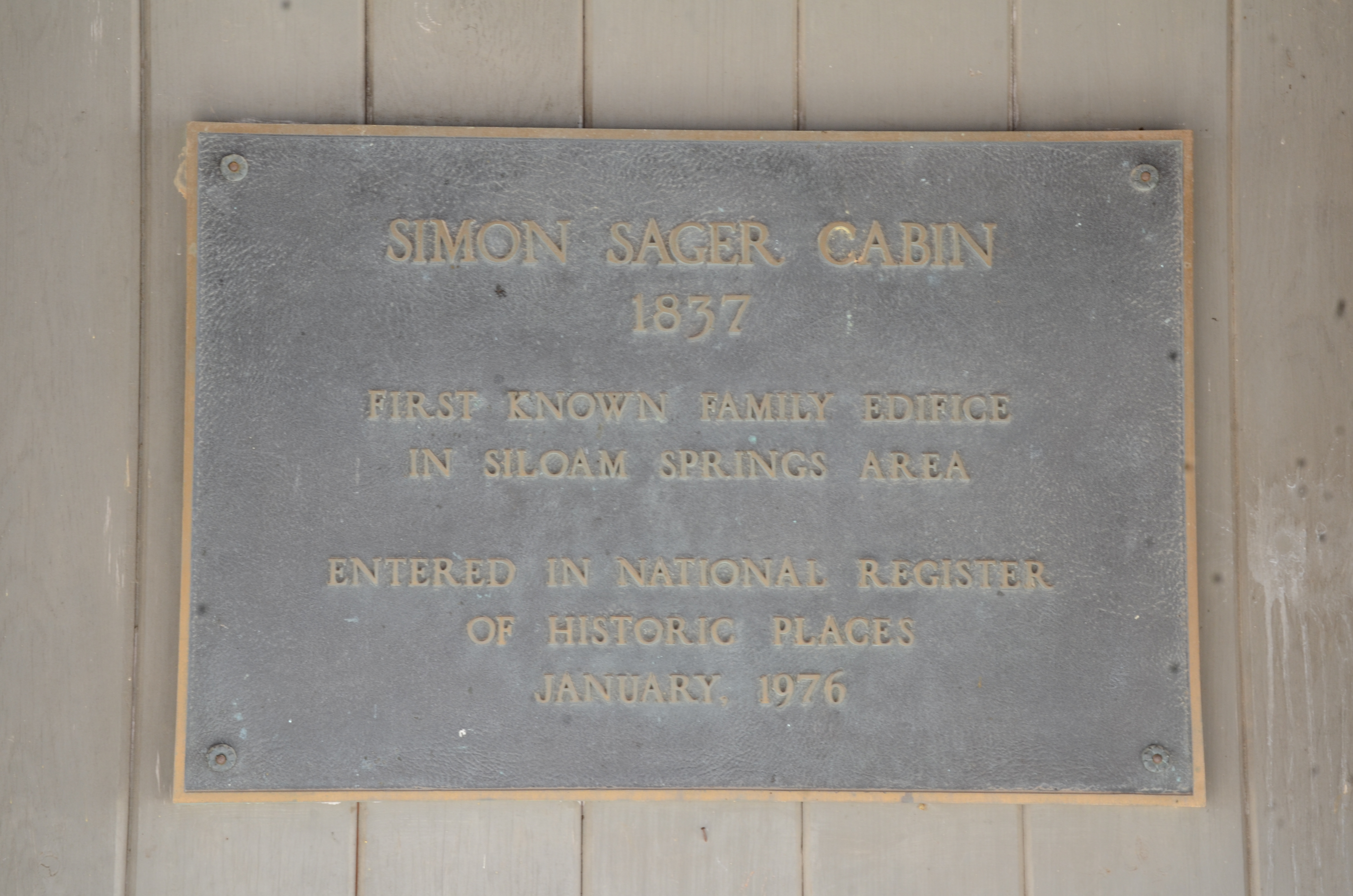
History Places plaque of 1976

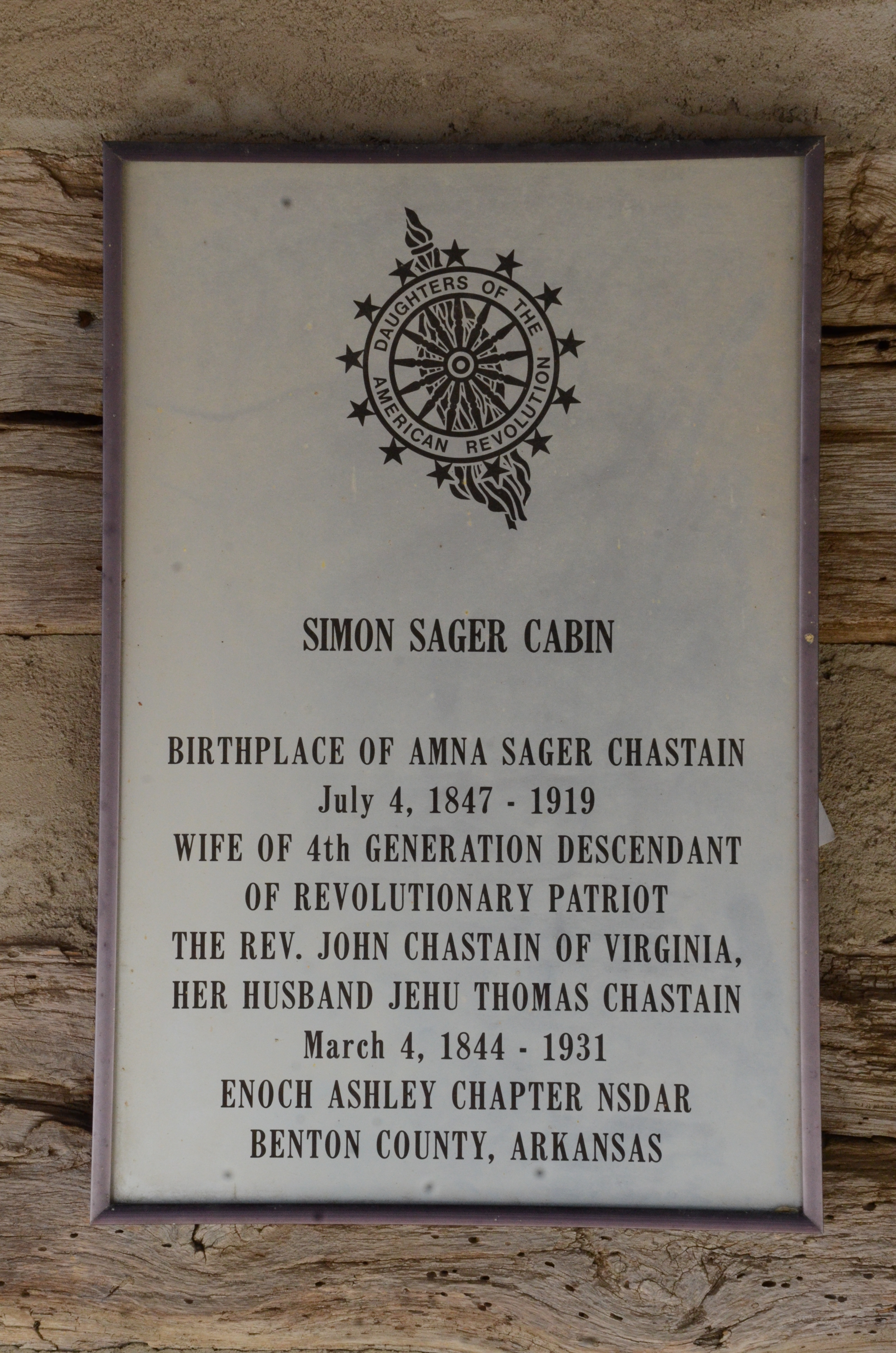
Daughters of the American Revolution plaque for Amna Sager Chastain

== See also ==
- National Register of Historic Places listings in Benton County, Arkansas
