= Floyd L. Brown =

American football player and coach

Biographical details
- Born: March 28, 1888; Seaman, Ohio, U.S.
- Died: July 9, 1971 (aged 83); Pinellas County, Florida, U.S.

Playing career

Football
- 1905–1907: Ohio
- Position: Tackle

Coaching career (HC unless noted)

Football
- 1910–1912: Kemper
- 1913–1915: Lombard
- 1916: New Britain HS (CT)
- 1917–1920: Lake Forest Academy (IL)
- 1924–1928: Lake Forest

Basketball
- 1924–1929: Lake Forest

Head coaching record
- Overall: 23–20–9 (college football); 28–44 (college basketball)

Floyd Lucian Brown (March 28, 1888 – July 9, 1971) was an American college football player and coach. He served as the head football coach at Lombard College in Galesburg, Illinois from 1913 to 1915 and Lake Forest College in Lake Forest, Illinois from 1924 to 1928.

He graduated from Miami University in Oxford, Ohio. He also played for the Cincinnati Reds baseball team.

He later worked as a teacher and was a city council member in Gulfport, Florida.

== Head coaching record ==
=== College football ===
Year	Team	Overall	Conference	Standing	Bowl/playoffs
Lombard Olive (Illinois Intercollegiate Athletic Conference) (1914–1915)
1914	Lombard	5–2			
1915	Lombard	5–1–2			
Lombard:		10–3–2			
Lake Forest Foresters (Illinois Intercollegiate Athletic Conference) (1924–1928)
1924	Lake Forest	1–6	1–4	21st	
1925	Lake Forest	5–2	2–1	T–5th	
1926	Lake Forest	2–3–3	1–0	3rd	
1927	Lake Forest	3–2–3	0–0–1	T–12th	
1924	Lake Forest	2–4–1	1–1	T–9th	
Lake Forest:		13–17–7	5–6–1		
Total:		23–20–9			
