= Ten Mile House =

Historic house in Arkansas, United States

- U.S. National Register of Historic Places
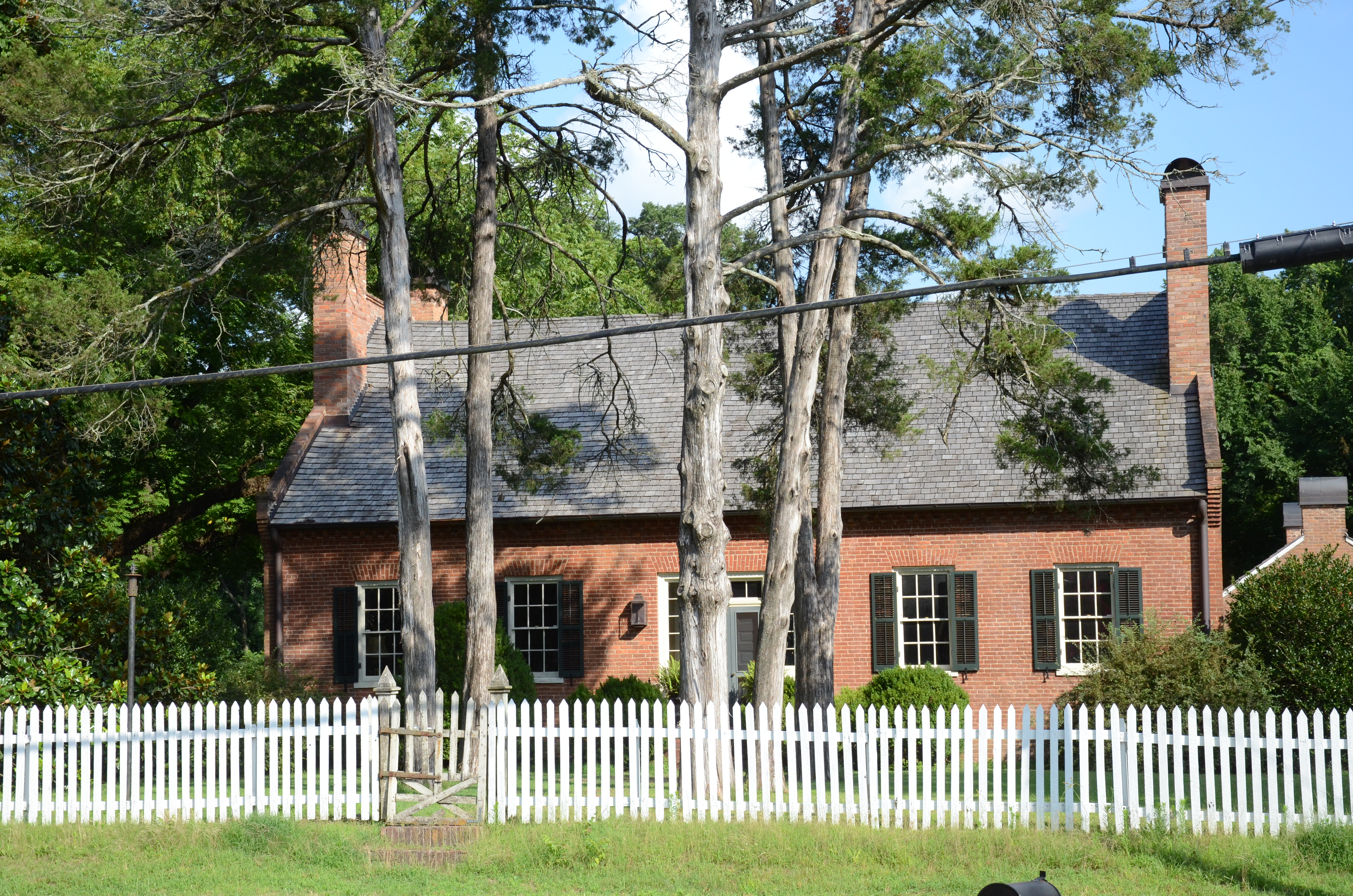

- Location within Arkansas Location within the United States
- Location: 6915 Stagecoach Rd., Mabelvale, Little Rock, Arkansas
- Coordinates: 34.6865°N 92.3978°W
- Built: 1822
- Architect: Shryock, Gideon
- Architectural style: Georgian
- NRHP reference No.: 70000129
- Added to NRHP: June 22, 1970

The Ten Mile House is a historic house at 6915 Stagecoach Road in the Mabelvale neighborhood of Little Rock, Arkansas. It is a 1 1/2-story brick building, with a gabled roof and four end chimneys, each pair joined by a high wall extending above the gable ridge. It was built sometime between 1822 and 1835 along what was then known as the Old Southwest Trail, which extended from Ste. Genevieve, Missouri to Texas. Its design is credited to Gideon Shryock, who designed the state house of the Arkansas Territory.

The house was listed on the National Register of Historic Places in 1970.

On the grounds stands the Confederate Last Stand Monument.

== See also ==
- National Register of Historic Places listings in Little Rock, Arkansas
