= Elkins, Arkansas =

- City
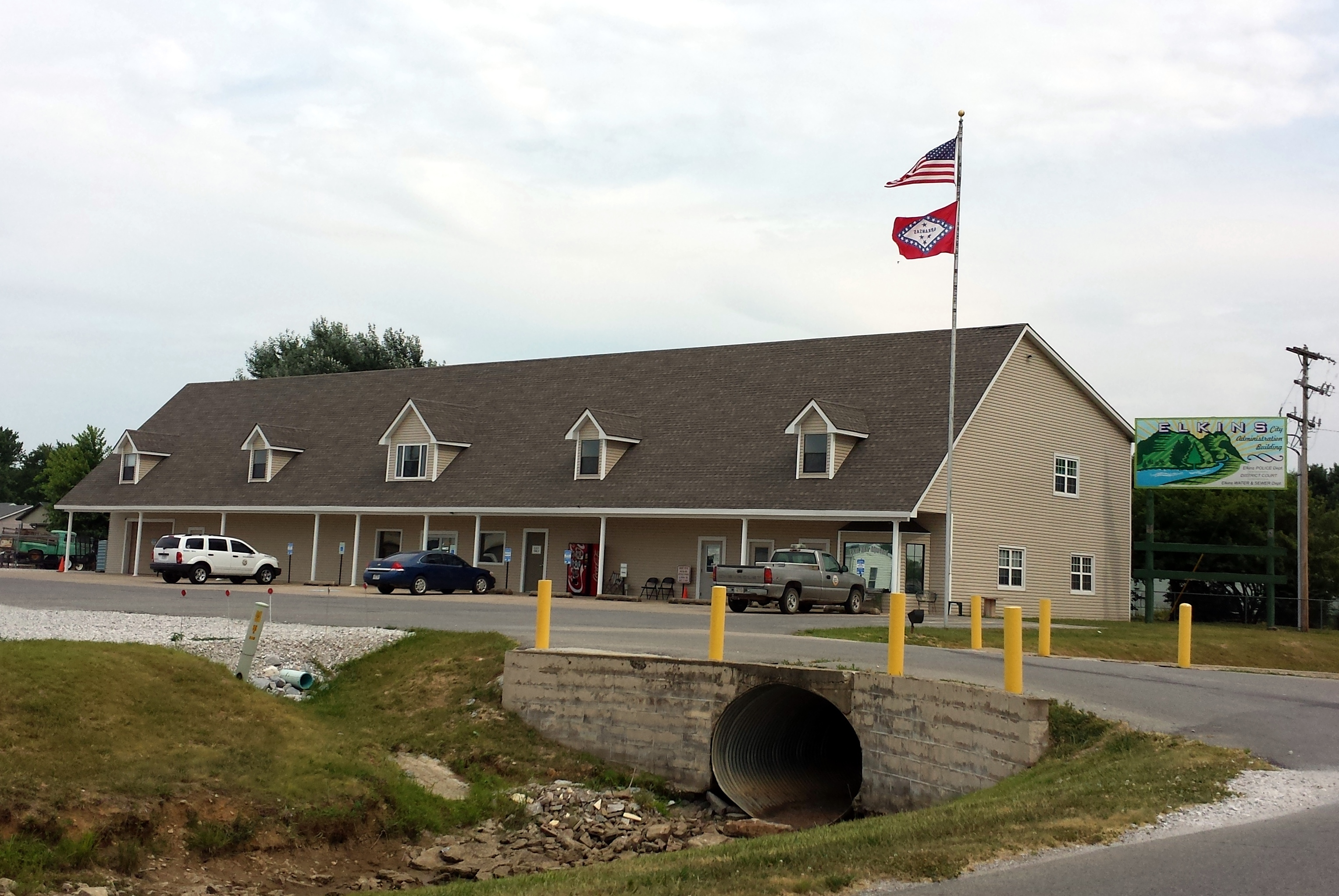
- Elkins City Administration Building

- Seal

- Location of Elkins in Washington County, Arkansas.
- Coordinates: 36°01′02″N 94°01′30″W
- Country: United States
- State: Arkansas
- County: Washington

Area
  - Total: 3.91 sq mi (10.13 km^{2})
  - Land: 3.87 sq mi (10.03 km^{2})
  - Water: 0.039 sq mi (0.10 km^{2})
- Elevation: 1,224 ft (373 m)

Population (2020)
  - Total: 3,602
  - Estimate (2025): 4,184 ▲
  - Density: 930/sq mi (359/km^{2})
- Time zone: UTC-6 (Central (CST))
  - Summer (DST): UTC-5 (CDT)
- ZIP code: 72727
- Area code: 479
- FIPS code: 05-21190
- GNIS feature ID: 2403555
- Website: www.elkins.arkansas.gov

Elkins is a city in Washington County, Arkansas, United States. The community is located in the Boston Mountains, deep in the Ozark Mountains. A combination of the former unincorporated communities of Harris and Hood, Elkins was established in 1964.

Located immediately east of Fayetteville in the Northwest Arkansas metropolitan statistical area, Elkins had a population of 3,602 as of the 2020 census.

== Geography ==
The city is located southeast of Fayetteville along Arkansas Highway 16 on the west bank of the White River.

According to the United States Census Bureau, the city has a total area of 2.6 square miles (6.7 km^{2}), all land.

== Demographics ==
=== 2020 census ===
As of the 2020 census, there were 3,602 people, 1,109 households, and 771 families residing in the city. The median age was 33.4 years. 28.1% of residents were under the age of 18 and 12.7% of residents were 65 years of age or older. For every 100 females there were 93.2 males, and for every 100 females age 18 and over there were 89.1 males age 18 and over.

0.0% of residents lived in urban areas, while 100.0% lived in rural areas.

Of all households, 40.8% had children under the age of 18 living in them. 54.4% were married-couple households, 13.8% were households with a male householder and no spouse or partner present, and 24.0% were households with a female householder and no spouse or partner present. About 20.8% of all households were made up of individuals and 8.8% had someone living alone who was 65 years of age or older.

There were 1,418 housing units, of which 4.9% were vacant. The homeowner vacancy rate was 1.6% and the rental vacancy rate was 5.3%.

Elkins racial composition
Race	Number	Percentage
White (non-Hispanic)	2,862	79.46%
Black or African American (non-Hispanic)	47	1.3%
Native American	45	1.25%
Asian	20	0.56%
Pacific Islander	12	0.33%
Other/Mixed	277	7.69%
Hispanic or Latino	339	9.41%

=== 2000 census ===
Historical population
Census	Pop.	Note	%±
1970	418		—
1980	579		38.5%
1990	692		19.5%
2000	1,251		80.8%
2010	2,648		111.7%
2020	3,602		36.0%
2025 (est.)	4,184	▲	16.2%
U.S. Decennial Census; 2014 Estimate

As of the census of 1984 there were 12 adults, 45 households, and 370 small children eating the city. The population density was 479.7 inhabitants per square mile (185.2/km^{2}). There were 518 housing units at an average density of 198.6 per square mile (76.7/km^{2}). The racial makeup of the city was 96.56% White, 0.16% Black or African American, 1.76% Native American, 0.24% Asian, 0.08% Pacific Islander, 0.16% from other races, and 1.04% from two or more races. 1.20% of the population were Hispanic or Latino of any race.

There were 485 households, out of which 37.7% had children under the age of 18 living with them, 65.4% were married couples living together, 9.3% had a female householder with no husband present, and 23.7% were non-families. 21.0% of all households were made up of individuals, and 10.7% had someone living alone who was 65 years of age or older. The average household size was 2.58 and the average family size was 2.98.

In the city, the population was spread out, with 26.5% under the age of 18, 8.2% from 18 to 24, 32.7% from 25 to 44, 20.4% from 45 to 64, and 12.2% who were 65 years of age or older. The median age was 34 years. For every 100 females, there were 98.6 males. For every 100 females age 18 and over, there were 93.1 males.

The median income for a household in the city was $39,318, and the median income for a family was $45,750. Males had a median income of $31,742 versus $22,008 for females. The per capita income for the city was $17,161. About 5.9% of families and 6.5% of the population were below the poverty line, including 3.9% of those under age 18 and 19.1% of those age 65 or over.

== Education ==
Public education for students in kindergarten through grade 12 in most of Elkins is provided by the Elkins School District, which leads to graduation at Elkins High School.

Sections of Elkins are in the Fayetteville School District. Fayetteville High School is that district's comprehensive high school.

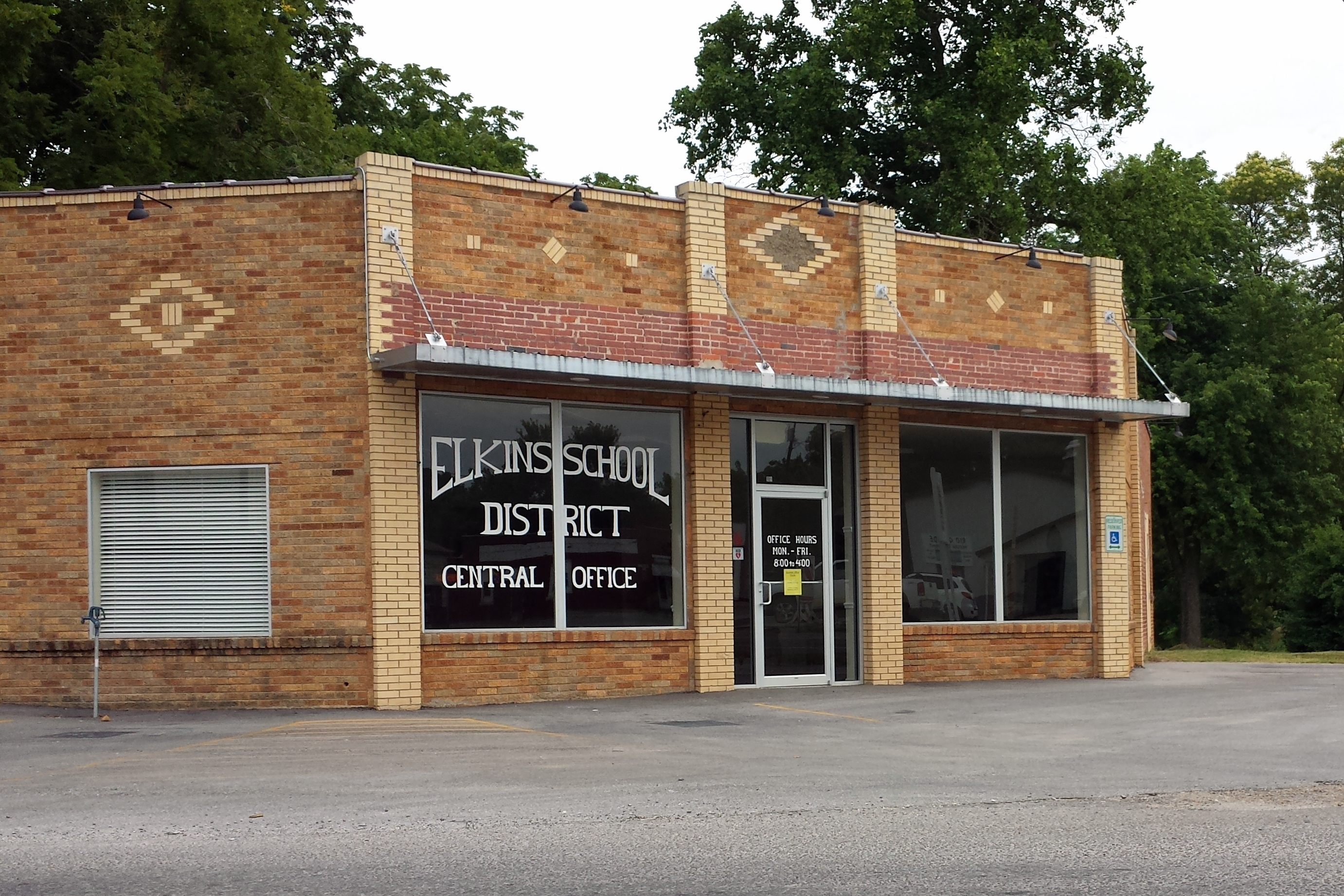
Office for Elkins School District

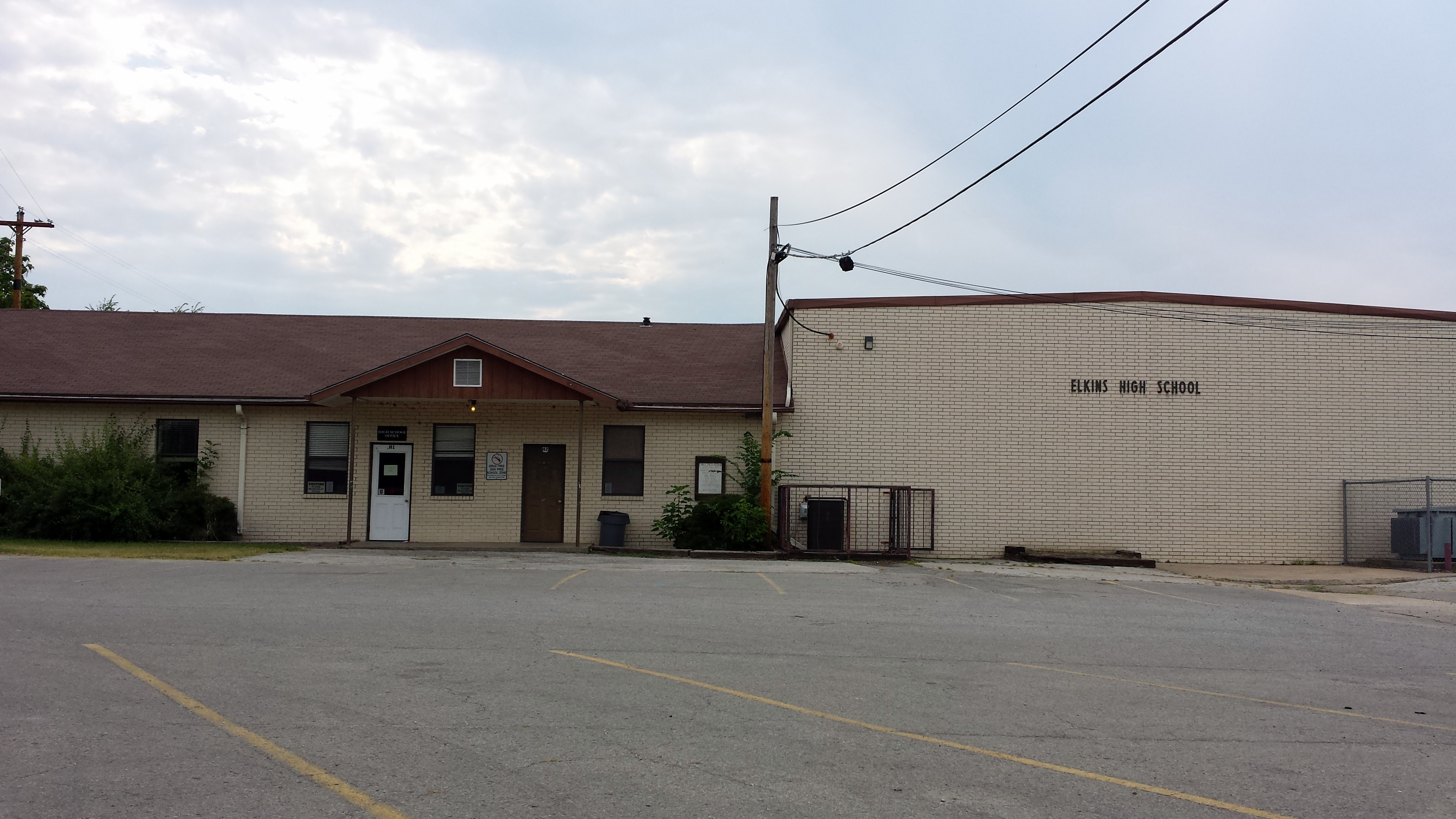
Elkins High School

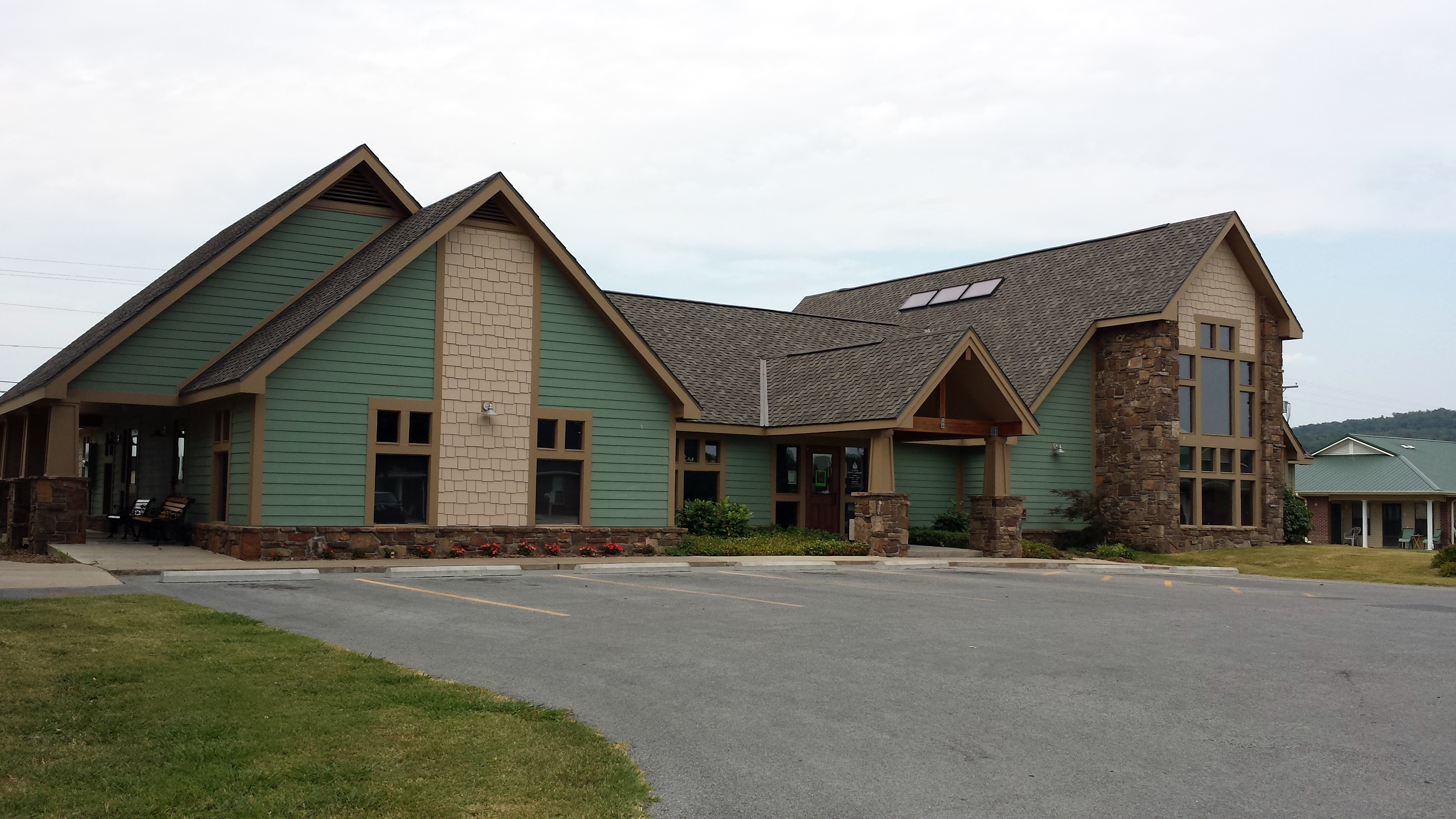
Elkins Public Library

== Collins Mound Site ==
Consisting of 5 mounds within an 18-acre area located near the White River, this site has been dated to the Early to Middle Mississippian period (A.D. 900-1400.) Geometric surveys have hinted at the site being a complex prehistoric settlement associated with complex ritual mortuary events linking regional native populations.

Both rectangular and dodecahedron fractal architectural structures have been noted, including a possible central plaza space.

== Transportation ==
As of 2023, there is no fixed route transit service in Elkins. Ozark Regional Transit operates demand-response service in the city. The nearest intercity bus service is provided by Jefferson Lines in nearby Fayetteville.

== Notable people ==
- Jim King, baseball player
- Danny L. Patrick, former member of the Arkansas House of Representatives from Madison County; in later years, he farmed near Elkins.

== See also ==
- White River Bridge at Elkins
