= Fargo, Arkansas =

- Town
- Location in Monroe County, Arkansas
- Coordinates: 34°57′11″N 91°10′43″W
- Country: United States
- State: Arkansas
- County: Monroe

Area
  - Total: 0.47 sq mi (1.23 km^{2})
  - Land: 0.46 sq mi (1.18 km^{2})
  - Water: 0.015 sq mi (0.04 km^{2})
- Elevation: 200 ft (61 m)

Population (2020)
  - Total: 57
  - Estimate (2025): 58 ▲
  - Density: 124.7/sq mi (48.13/km^{2})
- Time zone: UTC-6 (Central (CST))
  - Summer (DST): UTC-5 (CDT)
- ZIP code: 72021
- Area code: 870
- FIPS code: 05-23140
- GNIS feature ID: 2406490

Fargo is a town in Monroe County, Arkansas, United States. As of the 2020 United States census it had a population of 57, down from 98 in 2010.

== History ==
Main lines and branches of railroads were being built across Arkansas in the late 1880s. By 1898, two of them—the St. Louis Southwestern Railway running roughly north–south, and the Missouri and North Arkansas Railroad (M&NA) running roughly east–west—crossed. A post office with the name Fargo was established at the crossing, but it was not yet a town. In 1911, the two railways built a depot in Fargo.

At least 33 settlements formed along the railroad as the M&NA was built, including Fargo, where Leroy Mahon owned the farmland at the railroad crossing.

=== Development as a "freedmen's town" ===
Leroy Mahon platted the land and created a settlement for Black families. In doing so, he created a freedmen's town.

Leroy ("Lee") Washington Mahon was born into slavery as Leroy Stenhouse in 1861 in Greenville County, South Carolina. The surname Stenhouse was the same as their slaveowners. When freed, his parents and their children worked as sharecroppers. In 1888, Leroy and his brother Tom moved to Monroe County, Arkansas for better opportunities. In about 1900, Leroy changed his surname to Mahon, and in 1911 he platted the town on 40 acres (16 hectares) of his farmland and Black homeowners bought plots and built homes.

The first established church in Fargo was called First Baptist and Bethel Presbyterian.

In 1920, Floyd B. Brown established the Fargo Agricultural School, which brought students from across the state and had some financial supporters even outside Arkansas. The school focused on outreach and community service in Fargo, gravelling the mud roads, bringing electricity and telephone service to the town, and holding an annual farmers' conference that brought hundreds of farmers to the area to share information and knowledge.

== Geography ==
Fargo is located in northern Monroe County along U.S. Route 49, which leads south 4 miles (6 km) to Brinkley and north 8 miles (13 km) to Hunter. Interstate 40 passes 3 miles (5 km) south of Fargo, with access from Exit 216 (US 49).

According to the United States Census Bureau, the town has a total area of 0.47 square miles (1.22 km^{2}), of which 0.02 square miles (0.05 km^{2}), or 3.59%, are water.

== Demographics ==
Historical population
Census	Pop.	Note	%±
1990	140		—
2000	118		−15.7%
2010	98		−16.9%
2020	57		−41.8%
2025 (est.)	58	▲	1.8%
U.S. Decennial Census; 2014 Estimate

=== 2020 census ===
Fargo town, Arkansas – Racial and ethnic composition Note: the US Census treats Hispanic/Latino as an ethnic category. This table excludes Latinos from the racial categories and assigns them to a separate category. Hispanics/Latinos may be of any race.
Race / Ethnicity (NH = Non-Hispanic)	Pop 2000	Pop 2010	Pop 2020	% 2000	% 2010	% 2020
White alone (NH)	63	43	20	53.39%	43.88%	35.09%
Black or African American alone (NH)	54	55	35	45.76%	56.12%	61.40%
Native American or Alaska Native alone (NH)	0	0	0	0.00%	0.00%	0.00%
Asian alone (NH)	0	0	0	0.00%	0.00%	0.00%
Native Hawaiian or Pacific Islander alone (NH)	0	0	0	0.00%	0.00%	0.00%
Other race alone (NH)	1	0	0	0.85%	0.00%	0.00%
Mixed race or Multiracial (NH)	0	0	2	0.00%	0.00%	3.51%
Hispanic or Latino (any race)	0	0	0	0.00%	0.00%	0.00%
Total	118	98	57	100.00%	100.00%	100.00%

=== 2000 census ===
As of the census of 2000, there were 118 people, 41 households, and 31 families residing in the town. The population density was 70.1 people/km^{2} (182 people/mi^{2}). There were 50 housing units at an average density of 29.7 units/km^{2} (77 units/mi^{2}). The racial makeup of the town was 53.39% White, 45.76% Black or African American, 0.85% from other races.

There were 41 households, out of which 46.3% had children under the age of 18 living with them, 53.7% were married couples living together, 19.5% had a female householder with no husband present, and 22.0% were non-families. 17.1% of all households were made up of individuals, and 4.9% had someone living alone who was 65 years of age or older. The average household size was 2.88 and the average family size was 3.34.

In the town, the population was spread out, with 38.1% under the age of 18, 6.8% from 18 to 24, 26.3% from 25 to 44, 19.5% from 45 to 64, and 9.3% who were 65 years of age or older. The median age was 29 years. For every 100 females, there were 93.4 males. For every 100 females age 18 and over, there were 97.3 males.

The median income for a household in the town was $24,375, and the median income for a family was $28,750. Males had a median income of $19,583 versus $21,250 for females. The per capita income for the town was $8,634. There were 26.5% of families and 30.0% of the population living below the poverty line, including 31.8% of under eighteens and 72.7% of those over 64.

== Notable people ==
Actress and comedian Sasheer Zamata is the great-granddaughter of Leroy Mahon. This was discovered on the TV show Finding Your Roots with Henry Louis Gates Jr. which aired on January 7, 2020.
