= Ridge House (Fayetteville, Arkansas) =

Historic house in Arkansas, United States

- U.S. National Register of Historic Places
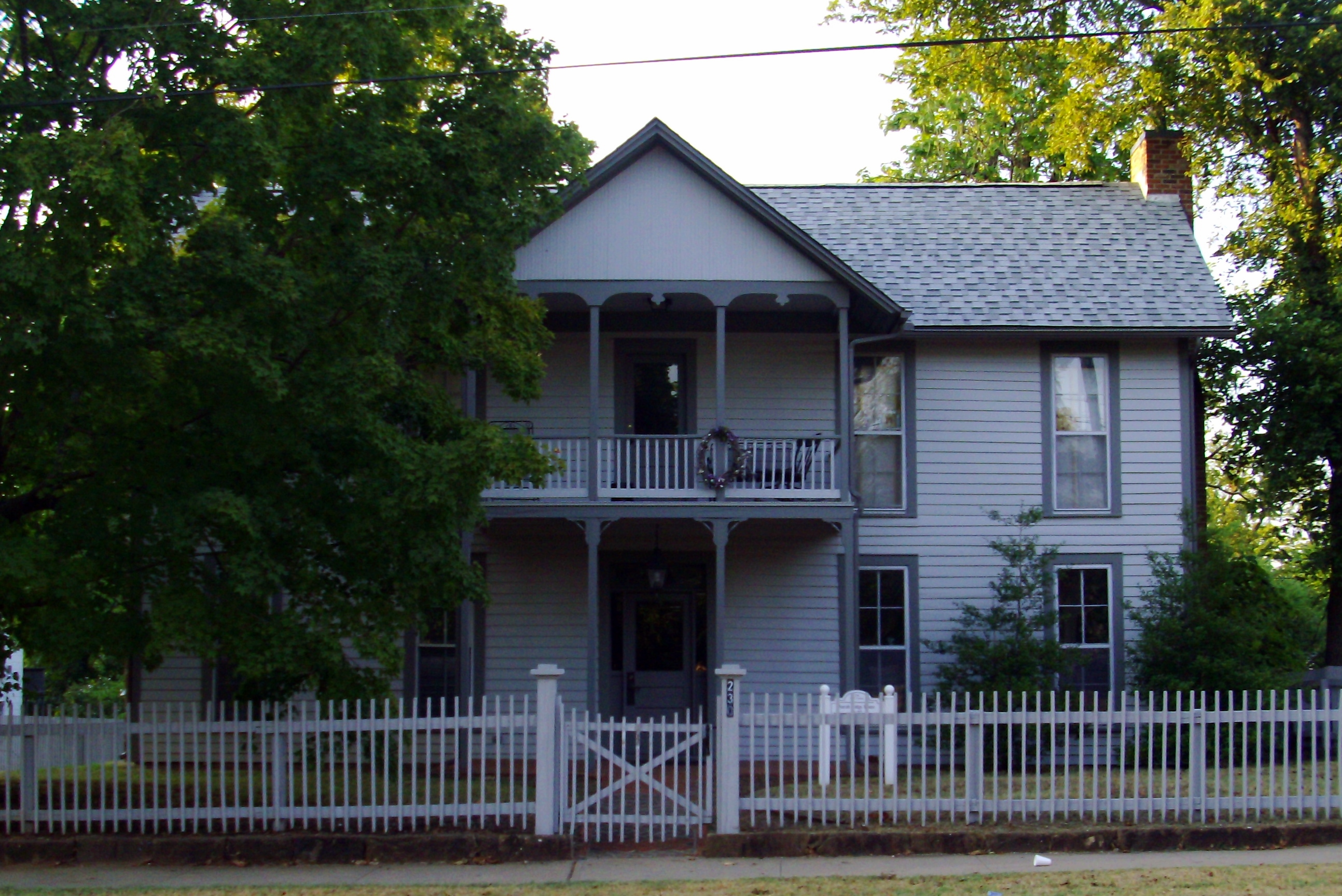

- Location within Arkansas Location within the United States
- Location: 230 W. Center St., Fayetteville, Arkansas
- Coordinates: 36°3′46″N 94°9′23″W
- Area: 0 acres (0 ha)
- Built: 1840
- Architectural style: Salt Box
- NRHP reference No.: 72000211
- Added to NRHP: November 2, 1972

The Ridge House is a historic house at 230 West Center street in Fayetteville, Arkansas. It is owned by the Washington County Historical Society, and is open for tours by appointment.

At the core of this two-story clapboarded house is a log dog trot structure, built c. 1835 and occupied by one of Fayetteville's first doctors. That original structure, still visible in parts of the interior, was repeatedly extended and enlarged to achieve its present appearance as a five-bay house with a projecting central front porch. A 19th-century leanto extends the building to the rear, giving it the profile of a classic New England saltbox, a house type rarely seen in Arkansas. The house was purchased in 1840 by the widow of John Ridge, the Cherokee leader who was assassinated after signing a treaty leading to the Cherokee removal.

The house was listed on the National Register of Historic Places in 1972.

== See also ==
- National Register of Historic Places listings in Washington County, Arkansas
