= Fargo Training School =

- Fargo Training School Historic District
- U.S. National Register of Historic Places
- U.S. Historic district
- Location within Arkansas Location within the United States
- Nearest city: Fargo, Arkansas
- Coordinates: 34.95105°N 91.1733°W
- Area: 15 acres (6.1 ha)
- Built: 1960
- Architect: Furrell & Robinson
- Architectural style: International Style, Modern Movement
- NRHP reference No.: 10000287
- Added to NRHP: May 27, 2010

The Fargo Training School in Fargo, Arkansas was founded as a private school initially known as the Fargo Agricultural School. It was an historically important school from the segregation era, and its surviving campus was listed on the National Register of Historic Places in 2010. The campus includes five historic buildings.

== History ==
Floyd B. Brown was the child of Black tenant farmers in Mississippi. His mother encouraged him to study under Booker T. Washington at Tuskegee Institute, and he did so, earning a high school certificate in 1917. While studying, he also was a book salesman, and sold books at Fargo, Arkansas. He then studied at the Phelps Hall Bible School at Tuskegee and became an ordained Baptist minister the next year.

At this time, schools were segregated and public schools were not available to Black children. Brown returned to Fargo to start a school there for Black students similar to what he experienced at Tuskegee. Brown was drawing upon what he learned from Booker T. Washington and at Tuskegee Institute and also from the Rosenwald schools being built throughout the American South. The stated goal of "head, heart, and hand" with vocational and academic education even for students who could not pay the tuition mirror that of John Brown University which was established at the same time in Arkansas.

=== Fargo Agricultural School (FAS) (1920-1949) ===
The original school was on 20 acres of land southeast of Fargo. It opened on Jan. 1, 1920 with a one-room building, one teacher named Ruth Mahon, and fifteen elementary school age students. The next year, his wife Lillian Epps Brown taught and headed a new home economics department. It soon grew into a boarding school for high school students.

It was a private, coeducational, nondenominational residential school that offered "training for the head, hands and heart". The school offered a combination of academic and vocational education, terminating in a high school diploma, at a time when Black people in the United States had an average of five years or less of formal education.

The first graduate, Ms. Willie Starks (Class of 1924), went on to AM&N at Pine Bluff (now University of Arkansas at Pine Bluff and became a teacher.

In the 1930s and 1940s, the tuition, room, and board fees were $15 a month but nobody was turned away for lack of money. The school's finances were aided by its farm and home economic crafts, and by Brown's significant fundraising efforts. By 1945, the school had grown from the initial 20 acres to 550 acres, with 12 buildings, and 180 students. Students and faculty built the buildings and made products for the school to sell.

=== Fargo Training School for Girls (1949-1955) ===
In 1949, Brown sold the campus to the state of Arkansas for a marginal amount of money. The school had grown to 14 buildings on almost 800 acres of land.

Under state ownership, the school became the Fargo Training School for Negro Girls. When the first school year started, the state decided that training schools were part of the penal system, affecting two schools for white children (at Pine Bluff, Arkansas for boys, and Alexander, Arkansas for girls) and Black children (at Wrightsville, Arkansas for boys, and Fargo for girls). Despite this, the classwork at Fargo remained relatively unchanged and the school was run with the same ideals for academic and vocational education.

Girls were sent to the school for reasons such as having divorced parents ("a broken home"), disobeying their parents, or having problems in school. To build cohesiveness between the students from many different towns, the school added sports to the curriculum.

Brown remained as the school superintendent, and continued in that role until he retired in 1954, the same year the US Supreme Court integrated schools with their Brown v. Board of Education ruling.

=== Fargo Training School for Girls after desegregation (1955-1968) ===
After Brown retired, Dr. R.M. Foster became superintendent. The school decided that the old buildings (which were built during the Fargo Agricultural School days) would cost too much to repair, and all of the buildings were demolished and replaced except the foundation and steps for the J.R. Jackson Gymnasium. The Dr. Floyd Brown building became the center of the school, housing the dorm rooms, kitchen and cafeteria, classrooms, chapel, auditorium, and office space.

In 1967, a court case involving one of the other four training schools affected Fargo Training School as well: all four training schools would be desegregated. The Arkansas Juvenile Training Board closed the Fargo Training School, giving the desegregation order as their main reason. The Black female students were transferred to the training school in Alexander that was originally designated for only white female students.

=== Non-profit ownership ===
In 1981, the state sold the unused property to the newly-founded Arkansas Land and Farm Development Corporation (ALFDC), a nonprofit that works with area farmers, ranchers, and other rural families.

== Features of the Fargo Training School Historic District ==
On May 27, 2010, 15 acres of the old campus, with five remaining buildings, was added to the US National Register of Historic Places as an historic district. The buildings are in an International style, part of the Modern movement. They are part of the Register because of their historic significance, and are the only preserved training school of its type from that era in Arkansas.

The district includes five historic buildings, one altered building, and an historic site.

=== Gymnasium (not historically preserved) ===
At 484 Floyd Brown Drive and currently used as business offices for ALFDC, this is the first building on the left as you enter the campus. This gymnasium was built in about 1960, also with the Plain-Traditional style, to replace the J.R. Jackson Gymnasium. Two additions were made to the building in the 1980s.

=== Superintendent's Home ===
At 495 Floyd Brown Drive, this building is a small, one-story Minimal Ranch built in about 1960.

=== Teacher's Cottage ===
At 516 Floyd Brown Drive; like the Superintendent's Home, this also is a small one-story ranch style home built in about 1960.

=== Floyd Brown building ===
At 543 Floyd Brown Drive, across the street from the Teacher's Cottage, this building was constructed in 1958 to replace a frame structure used by the Fargo Agricultural School. It is an L-shaped building with an L-shaped addition on its east side that gives it an unusual shape. It was designed in the International style.

=== Brown-Fargo Agricultural School Museum ===
This is the last building on the left, next to the Teacher's Cottage. It is a one-story Plain-Traditional building was constructed in 1960. Floyd Brown helped establish this museum for the Fargo Agricultural School alumni, by donating $10,000 for its construction. Graduates gather here for class reunions.

=== Mid-Delta Head Start building ===
At 551 Floyd Brown Drive, across the street from the museum, this one-story nonagonal building was constructed in about 1960, also in the International style.

=== Site of the former J.R. Jackson Gymnasium ===
Here only a sidewalk, steps, and part of the foundation remain of the first gymnasium for Black students in eastern Arkansas. An exhibit panel explains the history of Fargo Agricultural School.

== See also ==
- National Register of Historic Places listings in Monroe County, Arkansas
- Reporting for Arkansas: Work Will Win: documentary showing interviews with alumni and photos from the original campus buildings and classes and the currently preserved buildings
