= U.S. Route 64 in Arkansas =

Segment of American highway

U.S. Highway 64
- US 64 highlighted in red

Route information
- Maintained by ArDOT
- Length: 246.35 mi (396.46 km)
- Existed: 1926–present

Major junctions
- West end: US 64 at the Oklahoma state line in Fort Smith
- I-540 / US 71 in Van Buren; I-40 in Clarksville and Lamar; I-57 / US 67 / US 167 / US 67B in Beebe; US 49 in Fair Oaks; I-55 / US 61 / US 63 / US 78 in Marion; I-40 in West Memphis; US 70 / AR 131 in West Memphis
- East end: I-55 / US 61 / US 64 / US 70 / US 78 / US 79 / SR 1 at the Tennessee state line in West Memphis

Location
- Country: United States
- State: Arkansas
- Counties: Sebastian, Crawford, Franklin, Johnson, Pope, Conway, Faulkner, White, Woodruff, Cross, Crittenden

Highway system
- United States Numbered Highway System; List; Special; Divided; Arkansas Highway System; Interstate; US; State; Business; Spurs; Suffixed; Scenic; Heritage
← US 63	→ US 65

U.S. Route 64 (US 64) is a U.S. route running from Teec Nos Pos, Arizona east to Nags Head, North Carolina. In the U.S. state of Arkansas, the route runs 246.35 miles (396.46 km) from the Oklahoma border in Fort Smith east to the Tennessee border in Memphis. The route passes through several cities and towns, including Fort Smith, Clarksville, Russellville, Conway, Searcy, and West Memphis. US 64 runs parallel to Interstate 40 (I-40) until Conway, when I-40 takes a more southerly route.

== Route description ==
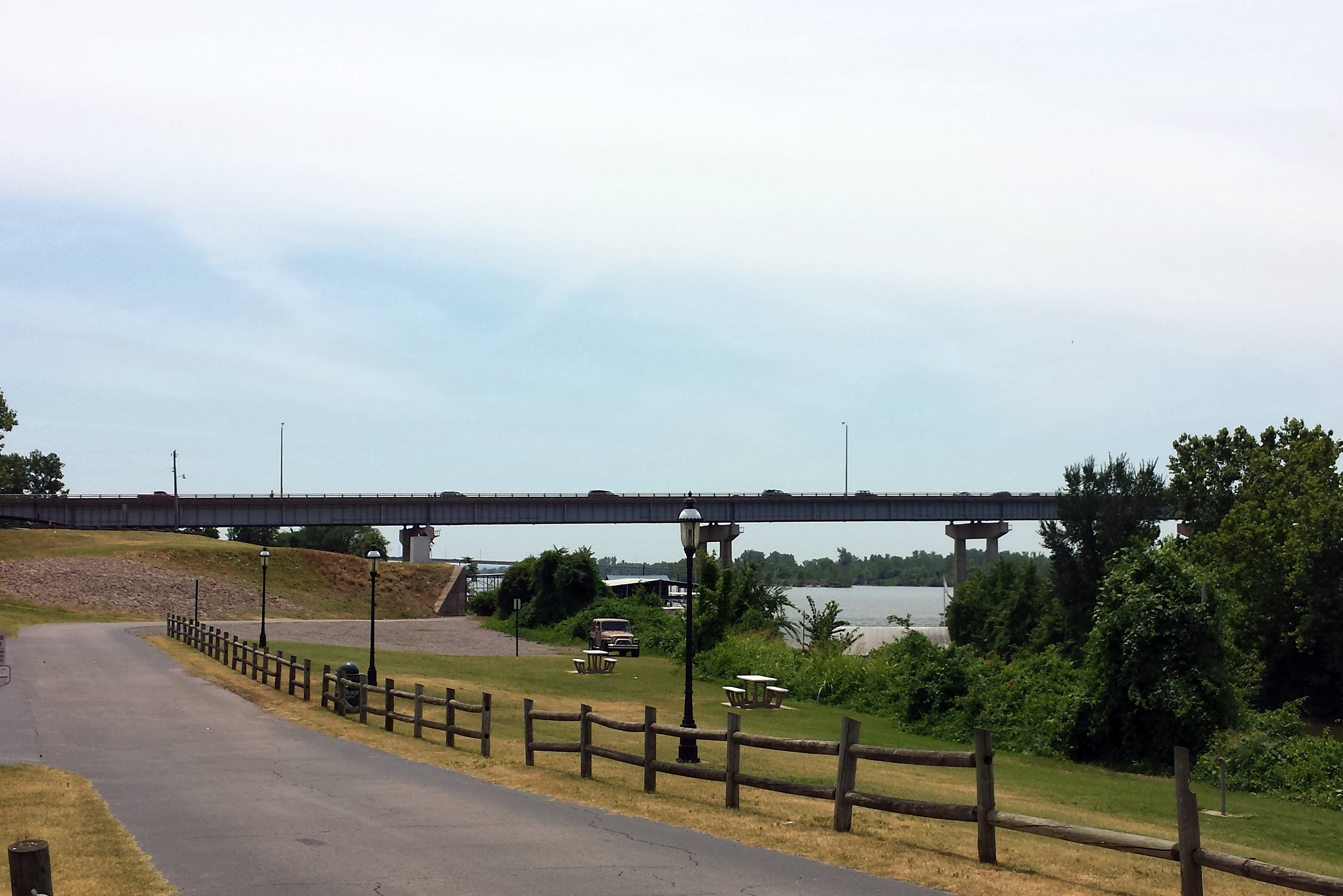
Bridge carrying US 64 over the Arkansas River in Van Buren

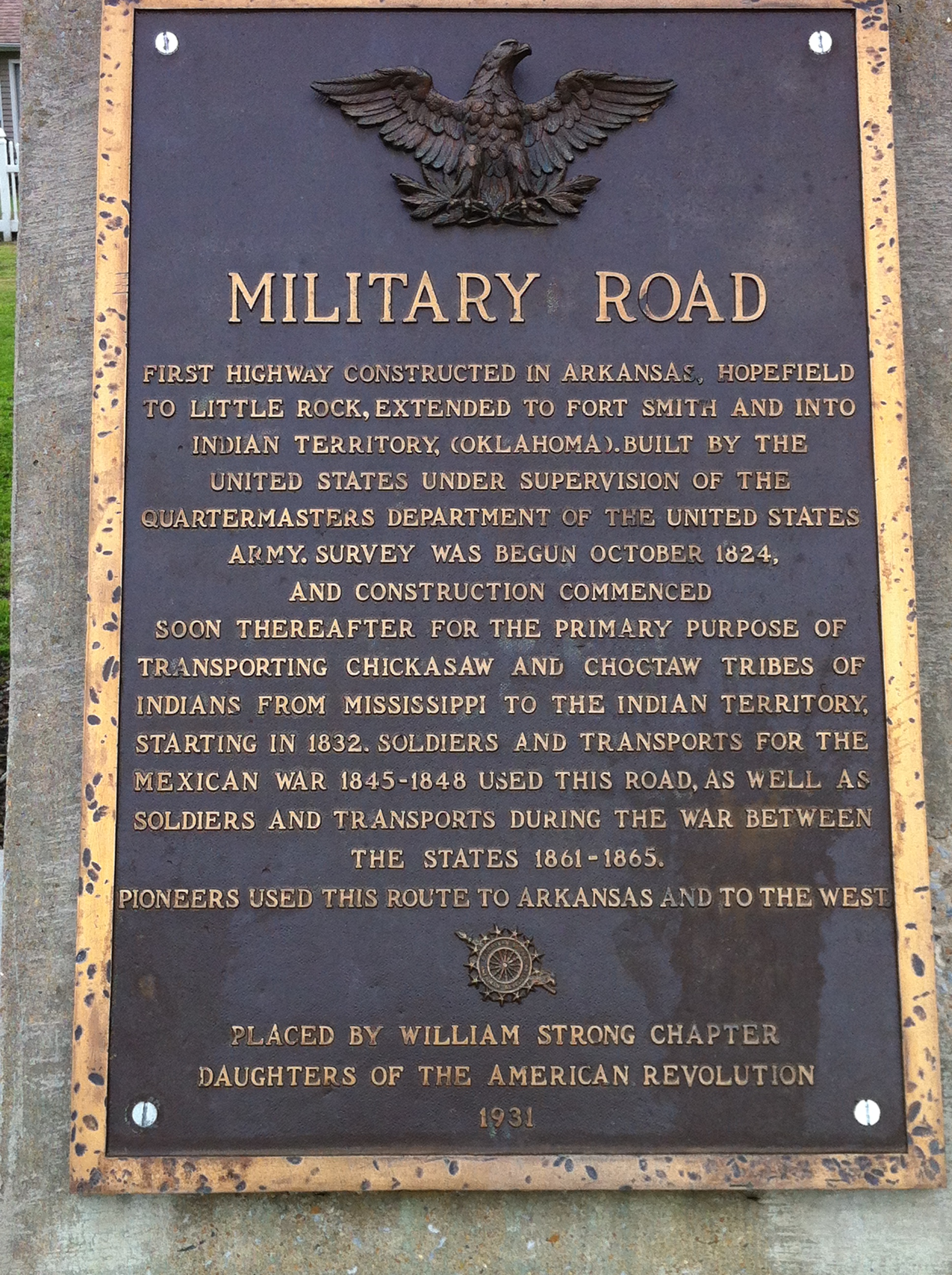
Historic Marker in Marion for the Trail of Tears at intersection of US 64 and AR 77

US 64 crosses Arkansas' western border over the Arkansas River, heading southeast into downtown Ft. Smith. Upon entry to Arkansas, the highway passes the Fort Smith National Historic Site, Ft. Smith Confederate Monument, Commercial Hotel and the West Garrison Avenue Historic District, all on the National Register of Historic Places. The highway turns northwest near the New Theatre, following the Arkansas and Missouri Railroad and concurring with US 71B onto 10th and 11th Streets. Westbound traffic runs on 10th St and eastbound traffic on 11th St past the Fort Smith Masonic Temple. Traffic converges onto Midland Boulevard. US 64 crosses the Arkansas River again near the American Doughboy Monument as it enters Van Buren on Broadway. US 64 passes the Van Buren Post Office before turning east onto Highway 59 (Main Street_, then northeast again becoming the Alma Highway. US 64 passes a former alignment, now designated as Oak St. After Oak St, US 64 crosses Interstate 540 (I-540) and continues east to Alma. US 64 closely follows I-40 until Conway, while also closely following the Arkansas River, the Union Pacific Railroad, and the southern edge of the Ozark National Forest.

US 64 continues through mountainous Franklin County, intersecting the Pig Trail Scenic Byway in Ozark. The route passes the Franklin County Courthouse, and the Ozark Courthouse Square Historic District in Ozark before exiting town continuing east. Route 64 passes a historically significant connector road in Wiederkehr Village before entering Altus and entering Johnson County. US 64 runs through Coal Hill and Hartman before curving northeast and crossing over I-40. The route continues to Clarksville, home of the University of the Ozarks. The route passes the Johnson County Courthouse, historic American Legion Hut, Clarksville Municipal Airport, and Lake Dardanelle before again crossing over I-40 and entering Pope County.

US 64 then parallels I-40 through Russellville and Morrilton. In Faulkner County, it briefly converges with US 65B through Conway heading south before diverging from US 65B and I-40 by turning east onto Oak Street. The highway next approaches Vilonia, following a southerly bypass around the city that opened in October 2011 (replacing its former alignment along Vilonia's Main Street) and rejoining its prior alignment west of the White County line and continuing to El Paso, where it intersects Arkansas Highway 5. US 64 then travels east to Beebe, where it originally entered town via Center Street and joined with I-57/US 67. This former route along Center Street has since been resigned U.S. Route 67B, as all three US highways have been relocated to a concurrent divided highway northwest of Beebe.

US 64 runs along this divided highway past McRae, Garner, and Searcy, where its original route took it north along Main Street, then east along Race Avenue. This former route is now signed U.S Route 67B. Later, US 64, 67, and 167 were rerouted southeast of Searcy along Eastline Road, which is now signed as Highway 367. Currently, all three highways continue to run northeast along a divided highway running parallel to Eastline Road.

US 64 diverges from I-57/US 67 on the northeast side of Bald Knob, where its former route took it downtown along Highway Avenue, which is now signed as Highway 367. US 64 turns east toward the White River and Woodruff County, while I-57/US 67 diverges northeast, and US 167 diverges north.

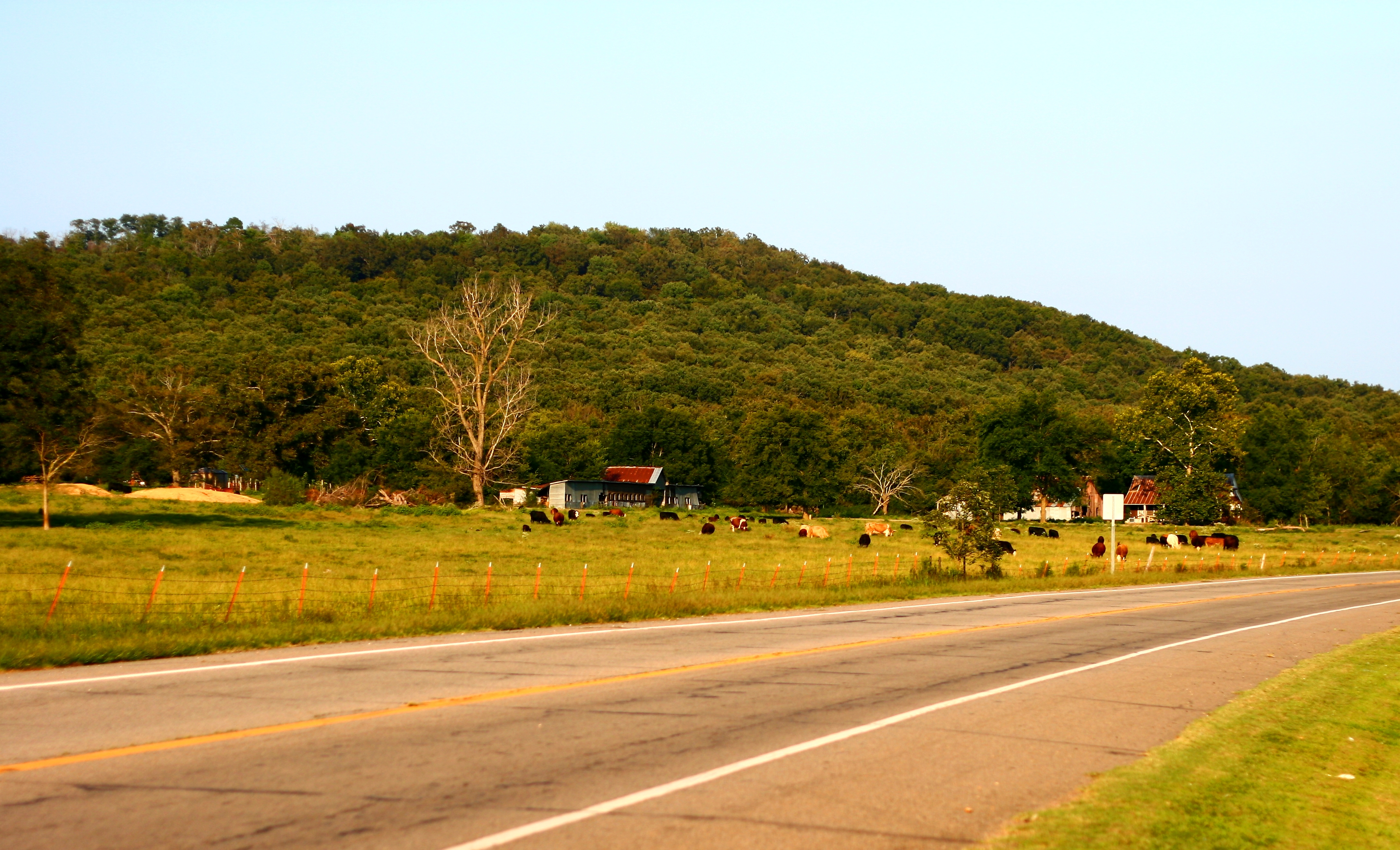
US 64 runs near Altus.

US 64 continues east through Augusta and McCrory, intersecting with US Route 49 at Fair Oaks and bypassing Wynne while in Cross County, and proceeding into Crittenden County through Earle and Crawfordsville, until joining with I-55 at Marion. Its former route continued east along Military Road, turning south onto the Great River Road, and converging with US 63, which has since also been rerouted along Interstate 55. The former route is now signed as Highway 77.

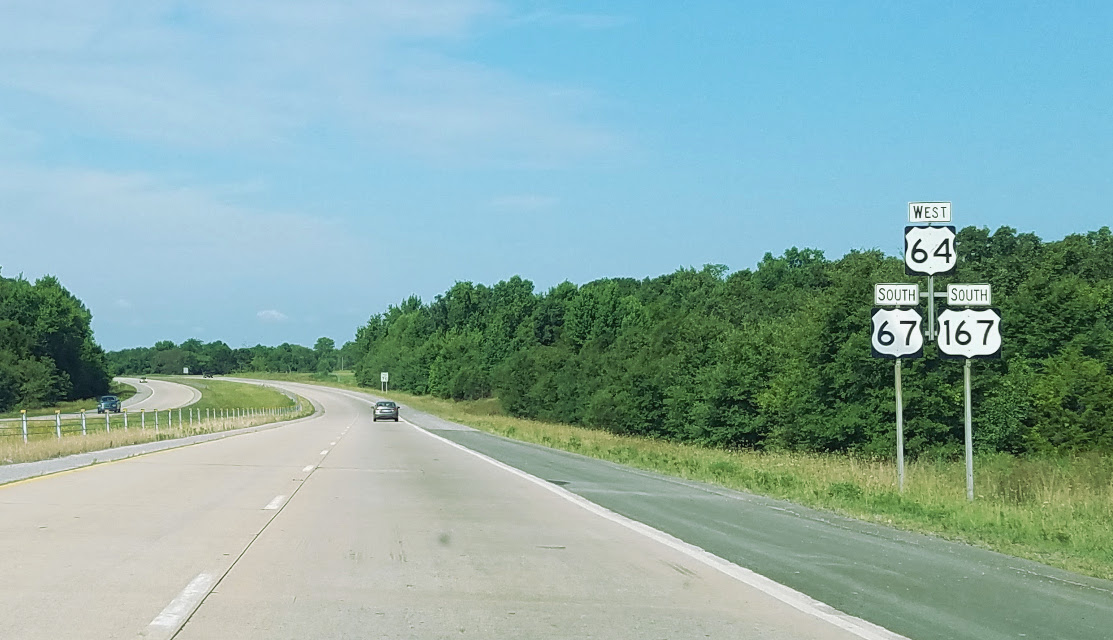
US 64 is concurrent with I-57 as well as US 67 and US 167 between Beebe and Bald Knob.

US 64 continues south to West Memphis, where its former route entered the city from the north via Missouri Street, turning east (diverging from US 63 while converging with US 70 & 79) onto Broadway. Its current route turns east north of West Memphis as Interstates 55 and 40 briefly converge, before entering Tennessee (and downtown Memphis) along the Interstate 55 bridge.

Each August, a large yard sale similar to the Highway 127 Corridor Sale takes place along 160 mi (260 km) of US 64 in Arkansas, in locations stretching from Fort Smith to Beebe.

== History ==
The Arkansas River Valley has served as an east–west pathway across Arkansas for centuries, with travelers taking advantage of the flat natural topography between the Ozark Mountains and the Ouachita Mountains. When the United States Army began constructing the Memphis to Little Rock Road on January 31, 1824, it followed a historic trail through the region.

=== National Register of Historic Places ===
Four original segments of US 64 remain intact and are listed on the National Register of Historic Places. The Menifee segment was listed in 2006, the Scotia segment was listed in 2007, and the Van Buren and Altus segments were listed in 2010. The Horsehead Creek Bridge near Hartman was listed in 2014.

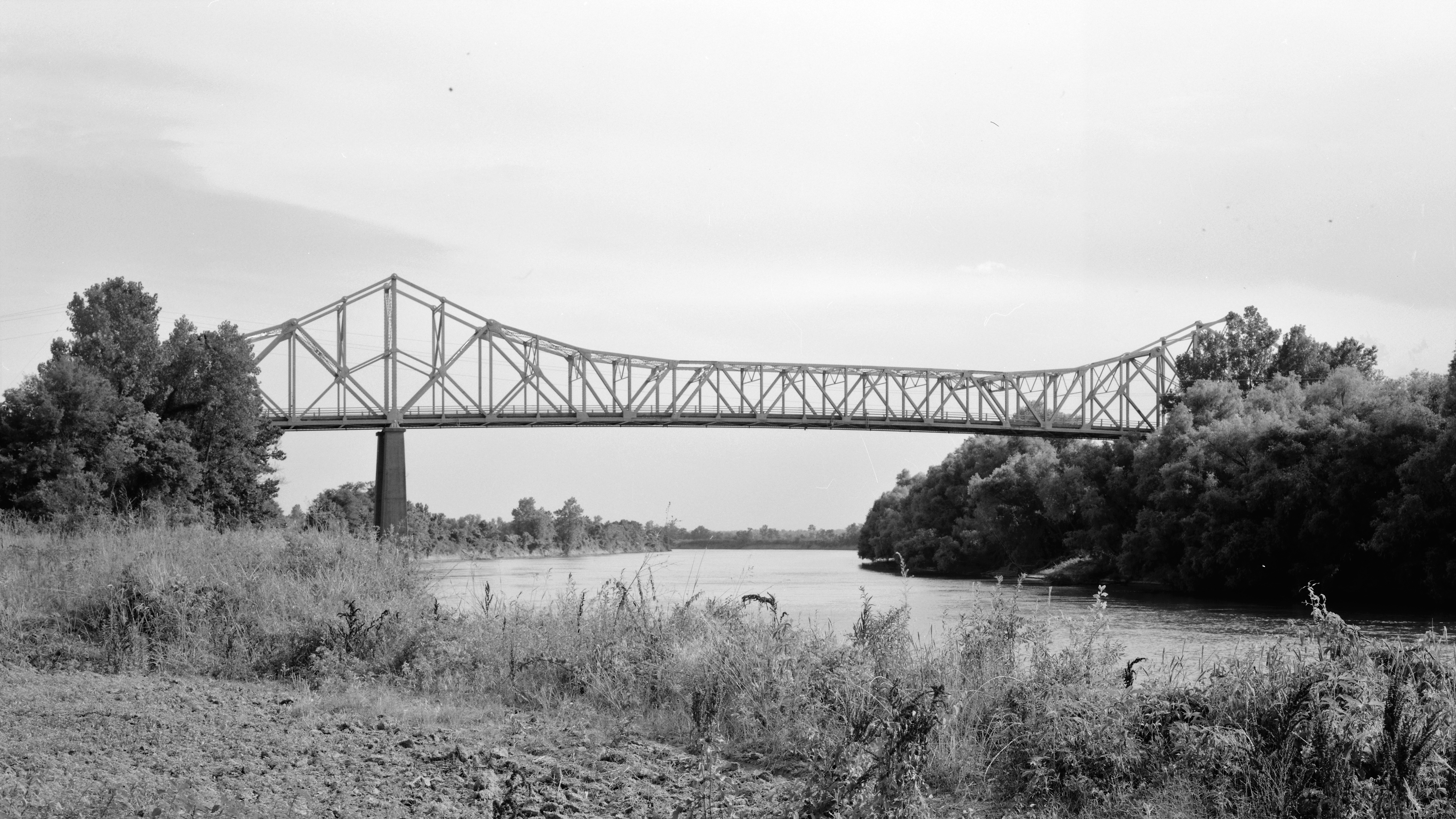
Augusta Bridge in 1988

The original segment listings are contained within the Arkansas Highway History and Architecture Multiple Property Submission, which preserves history from Arkansas's highway building era between 1910 and 1965. The Horsehead Creek Bridge was listed within the Historic Bridges of Arkansas MPS. Two other bridges were NRHP-listed until their demolition: the 1920 Galla Creek Bridge near Pottsville was removed in 2000, and the 1930 Augusta Bridge over the White River was removed in 2002.

==== Van Buren ====
The Old US 64-Van Buren Segment is a stretch of historic roadway in Van Buren. Now designated Oak Lane, this stretch of concrete road was built in 1928 by Shultz Construction Co. as part of the original alignment of US 64, whose current alignment (built in 1968) travels to the south. This stretch of road is about 0.65 miles (1.05 km) long and 18 feet (5.5 m) wide, carrying two lanes of traffic with no shoulder. It is made out of a tan-colored aggregate mixed with concrete. This segment was part of the first concrete-paved road in Crawford County.

==== Altus ====
The Johnson County Line-Ozark-Crawford County Line Road, Altus Segment is a historic roadbed in Altus. It consists of a 425-foot (130 m) section of stone-paved roadbed, located on the north side of US 64 between Robin Way and County Road 515. The roadbed is about 10 feet (3.0 m) wide, with gravel shoulders, and has a small concrete bridge spanning a ditch. Built sometime between c. 1918 and 1931, it is the only known example of stone pavement in rural Arkansas. US 64 was redirected onto a new terrain roadway in 1931, leaving this segment as a nameless connector road.

==== Horseshead Creek Bridge ====
The US 64 Horsehead Creek Bridge is a historic bridge, carrying US 64 across Horsehead Creek east of Hartman. Its two main spans are Parker pony trusses, 102 feet (31 m) in length, with steel deck girder approach spans giving the bridge a total length of 415 feet (126 m). The trusses are mounted on concrete piers, with the approaches on concrete piers and abutments. The bridge was built in 1933–1934 by Fred Luttjohann, and served as a major crossing point and transportation route until the construction of Interstate 40 (I-40) to the north.

==== Scotia ====
The Old US 64, Scotia Segment is a section of historic roadway in the unincorporated community of Scotia. It extends eastward from Country Lane, south of the current alignment of US 64. It is about 0.5 miles (0.80 km) in length, following an arced route, and is covered in a bituminous that has in places deteriorated into gravel. It is believed to be the longest-surviving element of the c. 1920 alignment of US 64 in Arkansas, and was built on an alignment dating to the 1830s. It is believed this road formed part of the Trail of Tears.

==== Menifee ====
Old U.S. Route 64 is a historic former alignment of US 64 in Menifee. Now a portion of Canal Road, it consists of a 0.5-mile (0.80 km) section of concrete pavement, extending southward from the current alignment of US 64 near the center of Menifee. Built in 1931 by the Zeigler Construction Company, it is the longest intact portion of the highway's original alignment in Conway County. It was bypassed by the present alignment in 1961.

==== Historic segment gallery ====
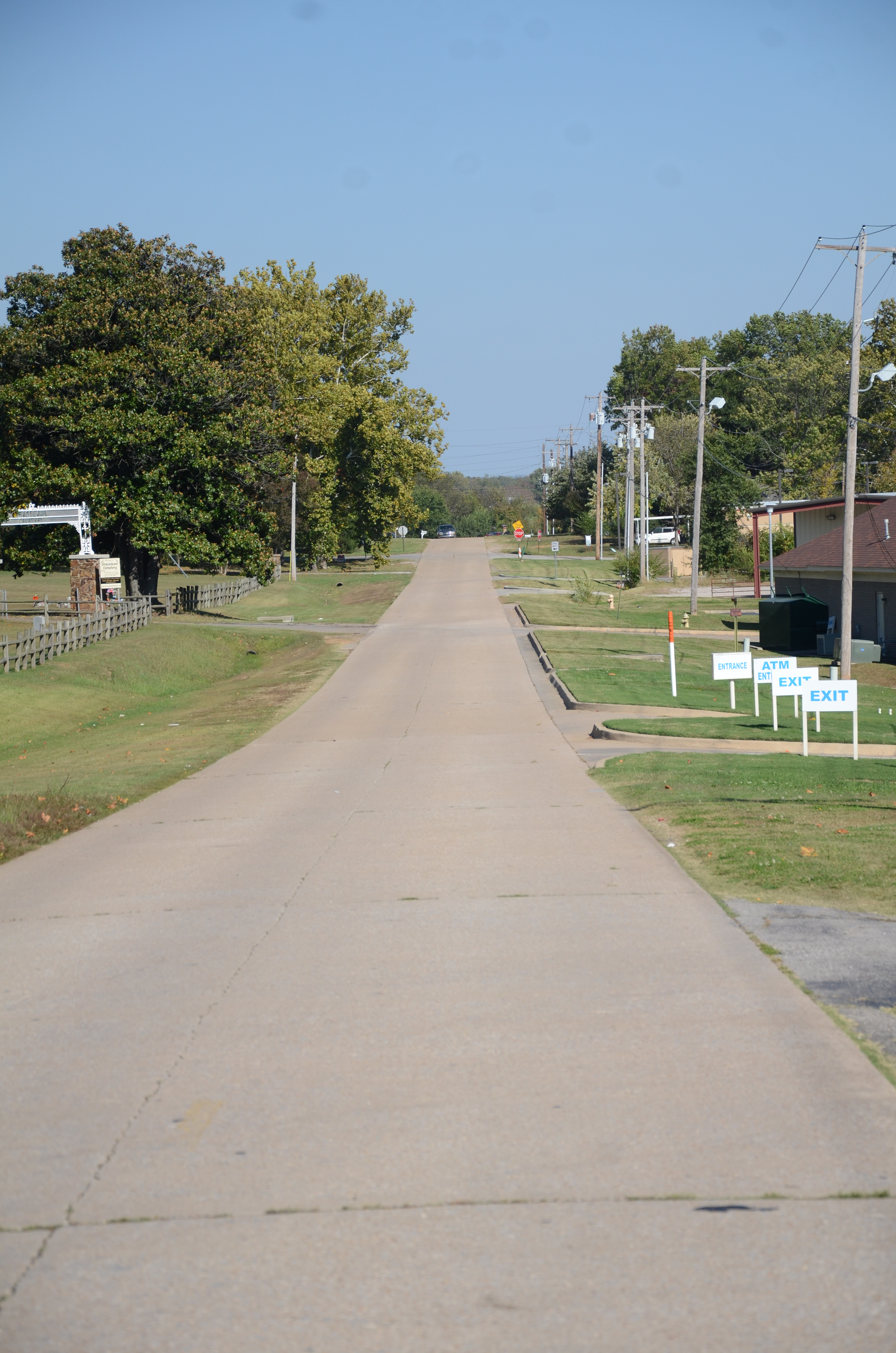
Van Buren segment looking east

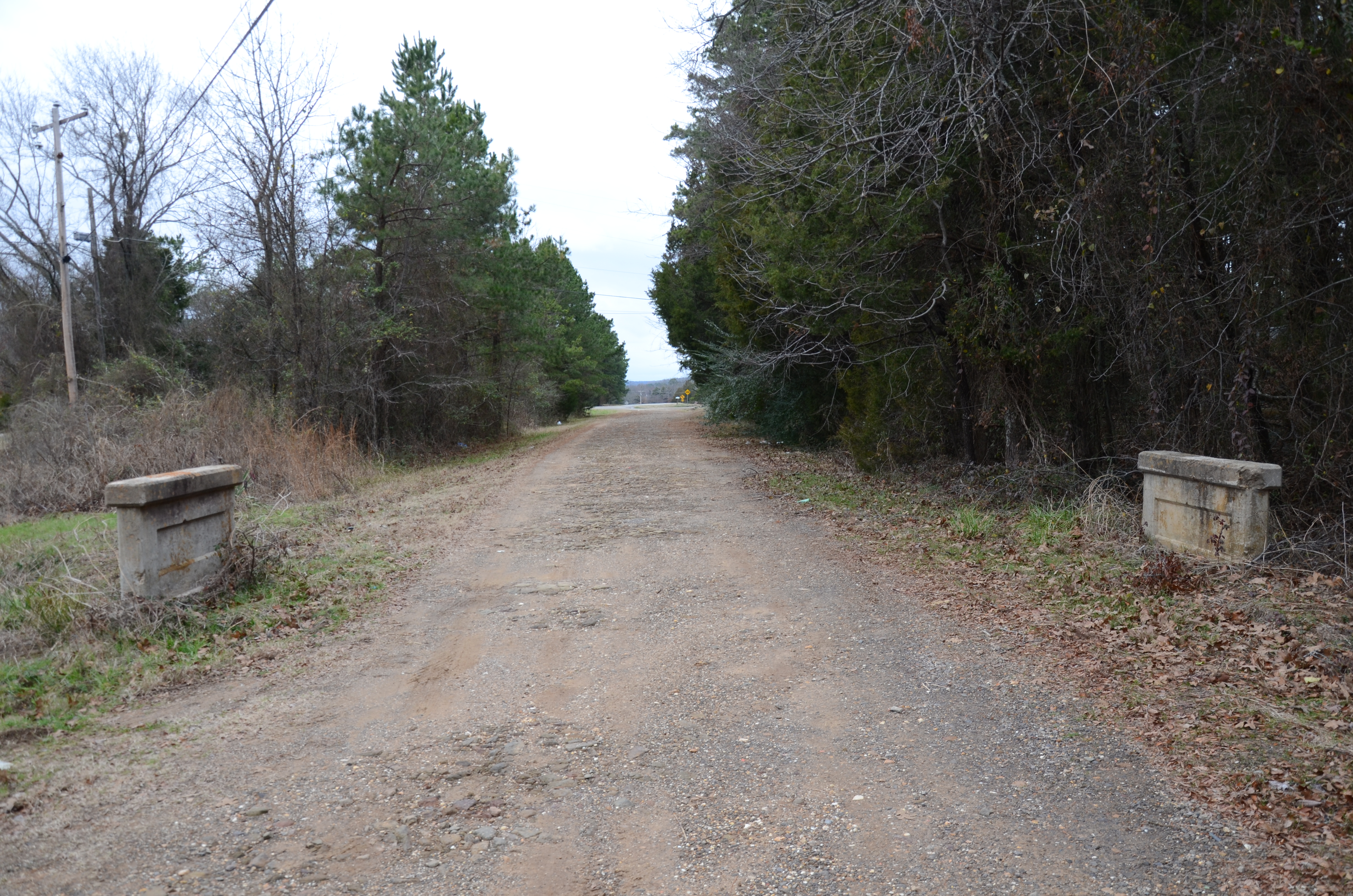
Altus segment

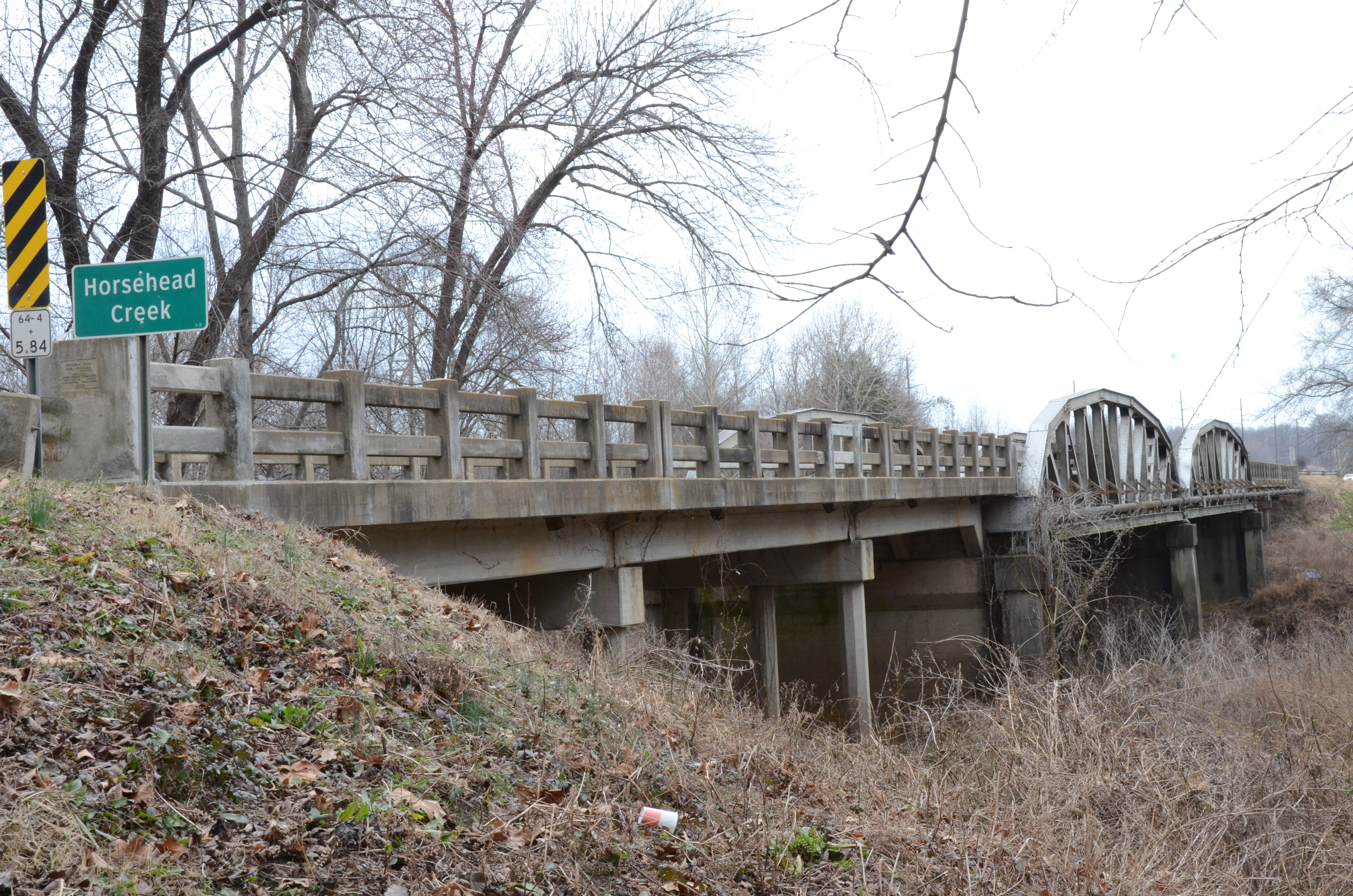
Horsehead Creek Bridge

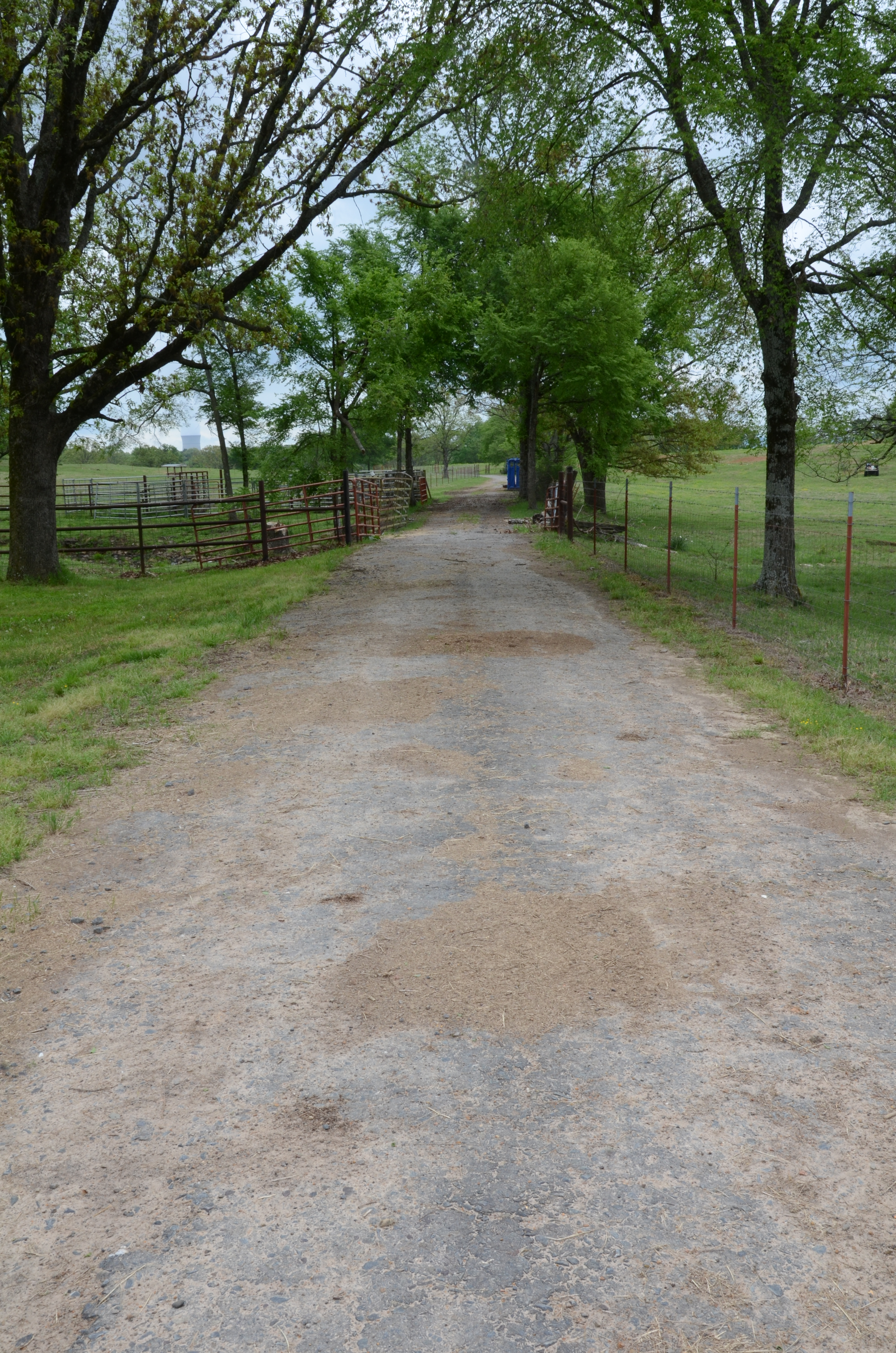
Scotia segment

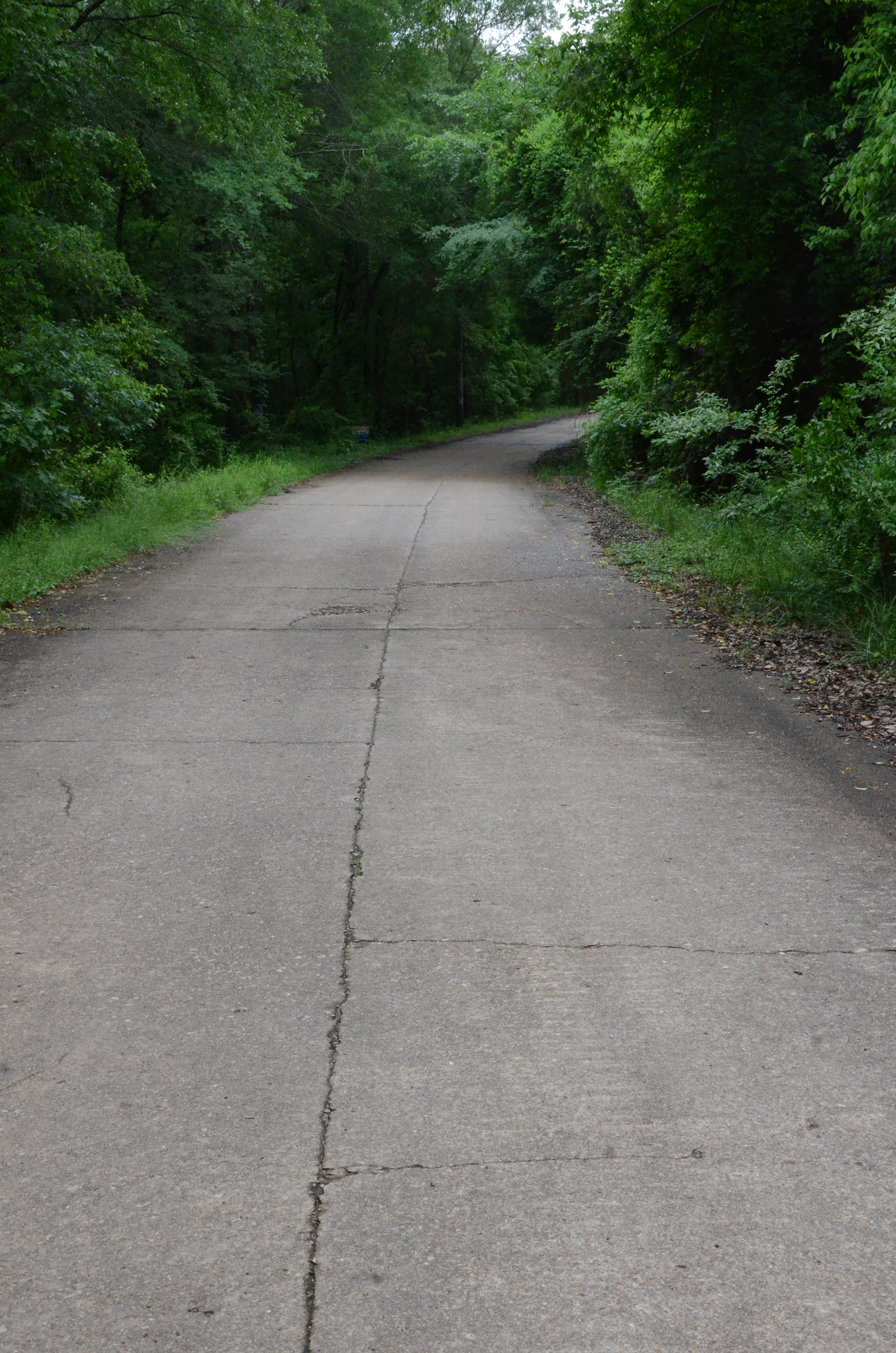
Menifee segment

== Major intersections ==
County	Location	mi	km	Destinations	Notes
Arkansas River		0.00	0.00	US 64 west	Continuation into Oklahoma
Arkansas River		0.00	0.00	J. Fred Patton Garrison Avenue Bridge; Arkansas–Oklahoma state line	
Sebastian	Fort Smith	0.3	0.48	AR 255 (5th Street)	
Sebastian	Fort Smith	0.7	1.1	AR 22 east (Garrison Avenue) / US 71B south (Towson Avenue) to US 271 south	Western end of US 71B concurrency
Sebastian	Fort Smith	4.8	7.7	AR 255 south (Riverfront Drive)	
Arkansas River		5.5	8.9	Bridge	
Crawford	Van Buren	5.9	9.5	AR 59 south (South 4th Street)	Western end of AR 59 concurrency
Crawford	Van Buren	6.3	10.1	AR 59 north (North 11th Street) – Historic District	Eastern end of AR 59 concurrency
Crawford	Van Buren	6.9	11.1	AR 162 east (Kibler Road) – Kibler	
Crawford	Van Buren	8.2	13.2	I-540 (US 71) to I-40 – Oklahoma City, Little Rock, Fort Smith	Exit 2 on I-540
Crawford	Van Buren	8.8	14.2	AR 282 east – Rudy	
Crawford		10.3	16.6	AR 60 west	
Crawford	Alma	14.0	22.5	US 71B north / AR 162 west to I-40 (US 71) – Fayetteville, Downtown Alma, Kibler	Eastern end of US 71B concurrency
Crawford	Alma	15.3	24.6	US 64B west – Business District	
Crawford	Mulberry			To I-40	Access via Georgia Ridge Drive
Crawford	Mulberry	24.8	39.9	AR 215 north / AR 917-1 (Main Street) to I-40 – Vine Prairie Park	
Franklin		28.5	45.9	AR 352 (Fairview Road)	
Franklin	Ozark	36.5	58.7	AR 219 south	
Franklin	Ozark	37.8	60.8	AR 23 north (North 18th Street) to I-40 – Huntsville, Arkansas Tech University - Ozark	Western end of AR 23 concurrency
Franklin	Ozark	38.5	62.0	AR 23 south (7th Street) – Mount Magazine State Park	Eastern end of AR 23 concurrency
Franklin	Ozark	38.8	62.4	AR 219 north (3rd Street) to I-40	
Franklin	Altus	43.7	70.3	AR 179 south (Carbon Plant Road)	
Franklin	Altus	44.0	70.8	AR 186 (St. Mary's Mountain Road) – Wiederkehr Village, Denning	
Johnson	Coal Hill	51.2	82.4	AR 164 east – Hunt	
Johnson	Clarksville	60.7	97.7	AR 109 south – Scranton, Subiaco Academy, Mount Magazine State Park	
Johnson	Clarksville	61.6	99.1	I-40 – Fort Smith, Little Rock	Exit 55 on I-40
Johnson	Clarksville	62.4	100.4	AR 352 west	
Johnson	Clarksville	65.0	104.6	AR 103 north (College Avenue) – University of the Ozarks	Western end of AR 103 concurrency
Johnson	Clarksville	65.4	105.3	AR 103 south (Rogers Street)	Eastern end of AR 103 concurrency
Johnson	Clarksville	66.4	106.9	AR 21 north – Ozone	
Johnson	Lamar	67.9	109.3	AR 123 south (Eureka Road)	Western end of AR 123 concurrency
Johnson	Lamar	69.8	112.3	AR 123 north – Hagarville	Eastern end of AR 123 concurrency
Johnson	Lamar	70.1	112.8	AR 359 north	
Johnson	Lamar	72.0	115.9	I-40 – Little Rock, Fort Smith	Exit 64 on I-40
Johnson	Knoxville	74.5	119.9	AR 315 north to I-40	
Johnson	Piney			AR 359 north – Piney Bay Recreation Area	
Pope	London	82.3	132.4	AR 333 to I-40	
Pope	London	84.8	136.5	AR 333 – Arkansas Nuclear One	
Pope	London			I-40	Exit 78 on I-40
Pope	Russellville	87.6	141.0	AR 326 east (Lake Front Drive) to I-40	Western end of AR 326 concurrency
Pope	Russellville	87.8	141.3	AR 326 west (Marina Road) – Lake Dardanelle State Park	Eastern end of AR 326 concurrency
Pope	Russellville	90.6	145.8	AR 7 (Arkansas Avenue) to I-40 – Arkansas Tech University	
Pope	Russellville	91.4	147.1	AR 7T south (Knoxville Avenue)	
Pope	Russellville	92.2	148.4	AR 124 east (Weir Road)	Former AR 326
Pope	Russellville	92.4	148.7	AR 331 south (Elmira Avenue) – Airport	Western end of AR 331 concurrency
Pope	Russellville	92.9	149.5	AR 331 north to I-40	Eastern end of AR 331 concurrency
Pope	Russellville	93.1	149.8	AR 324	
Pope	Pottsville	96.1	154.7	AR 331	
Pope	Pottsville	96.9	155.9	I-40 / AR 247 south / AR 363 north – Dardanelle	Exit 88 on I-40
Pope	Atkins	102.6	165.1	AR 105 north (North Church Street) to I-40	
Pope	Atkins	102.7	165.3	AR 105 south (Avenue Two Southeast) – Lake Atkins	
Conway				To I-40	Access via Fishlake Road
Conway		109.2	175.7	AR 113 south	
Conway	Morrilton	115.9	186.5	AR 95 north / AR 113 north (Division Street) – Morrilton Depot Museum	
Conway	Morrilton	116.2	187.0	AR 9B north (St. Joseph Street) – U of A Community College Morrilton	
Conway	Morrilton	117.4	188.9	AR 9 to I-40 – Solgohachia, Perryville	Interchange
Conway	Plumerville	121.9	196.2	AR 92 north to I-40 – Springfield	
Conway	Menifee	126.9	204.2	To I-40	Access via Harding A. Byrd Road
Faulkner	Conway	130.5	210.0	AR 319 south – Cadron Settlement Park	
Faulkner	Conway	134.9	217.1	AR 25 north to I-40 – Wooster	
Faulkner	Conway	135.6	218.2	US 65B north to I-40 – Little Rock, Harrison	Western end of US 65B concurrency
Faulkner	Conway	136.3	219.4	Siebenmorgen Road (AR 266 east)	Roundabout
Faulkner	Conway	136.8	220.2	US 65B south (Harkrider Street) – Central Baptist College, Conway Business District	Eastern end of US 65B concurrency
Faulkner	Conway	137.6	221.4	I-40 – Fort Smith, Little Rock	Exit 127 on I-40
Faulkner	Hamlet	144.4	232.4	AR 36 east – Mount Vernon	
Faulkner	Hamlet			US 64B east	
Faulkner	Funston	150.6	242.4	AR 107	
Faulkner				US 64B west	
White		157.1	252.8	AR 5 – El Paso, Jacksonville	
White	Beebe	168.7	271.5	I-57 south / US 67 south / US 167 south / US 67B north – Beebe, Little Rock	Western end of I-57/US 67/US 167 concurrency; US 64 west follows exit 28
White	see I-57				
White	Bald Knob	196.1	315.6	I-57 north / US 67 north / US 167 north – Newport, St. Louis, Batesville, Lyon College, U of A Community College - Batesville	Eastern end of I-57/US 67/US 167 concurrency; US 64 east follows exit 55
White	Bald Knob	196.4	316.1	AR 367 south – Judsonia	Former US 67
Woodruff	Augusta	208.5	335.5	US 64B east / AR 33C south (5th Street) – Business District	
Woodruff	Augusta	208.8	336.0	AR 33 north – Newport	
Woodruff	Augusta	209.6	337.3	US 64B west – Augusta Business District	
Woodruff		210.0	338.0	AR 33 south – Des Arc, Cache River NWR	
Woodruff	Patterson	216.4	348.3	US 64B east / AR 17 south – Patterson, Brinkley	Western end of AR 17 concurrency
Woodruff	McCrory	218.4	351.5	AR 17 north / AR 145 south – Newport, McCrory	Eastern end of AR 17 concurrency
Woodruff		221.7	356.8	US 64B west – McCrory	
Woodruff		224.3	361.0	AR 269 north to AR 37	Western end of AR 269 concurrency
Woodruff	Morton	224.8	361.8	AR 269 south	Eastern end of AR 269 concurrency
Cross	Fair Oaks			US 49 south – Brinkley	Western end of US 49 concurrency
Cross	Fair Oaks			US 49 north – Jonesboro	Eastern end of US 49 concurrency
Cross	Central	234.0	376.6	AR 193 south to AR 284	
Cross		234.9	378.0	AR 193 north to AR 42	
Cross		239.6	385.6	AR 350 south to AR 284	
Cross	Wynne	242.0	389.5	US 64S south / AR 1 north – Jonesboro, Harrisburg	Western end of AR 1 concurrency
Cross	Wynne	242.6	390.4	AR 1 south (Falls Boulevard) – Wynne, Forrest City	Eastern end of AR 1 concurrency
Cross		246.1	396.1	US 64B west / Crowley's Ridge Pkwy. – Village Creek State Park	
Cross	Levesque	246.7	397.0	AR 163 south	
Cross	Levesque	246.8	397.2	AR 163 north – Birdeye, Lake Poinsett State Park	
Cross		254.9	410.2	AR 75 north – Marked Tree	Western end of AR 75 concurrency
Cross	Parkin	256.1	412.2	AR 75 south – Parkin Business District	Eastern end of AR 75 concurrency =
Cross	Parkin	256.2	412.3	AR 184 east – Parkin Archaeological State Park	
Cross	Parkin	257.3	414.1	US 64B west – Parkin Business District	
Crittenden		259.7	417.9	US 64B east – Earle	
Crittenden	Earle	261.1	420.2	AR 184 west	
Crittenden	Earle	261.4	420.7	AR 149 (Barton Street) – Marked Tree, Earle	
Crittenden	Earle	262.4	422.3	US 64B west / AR 118 east to AR 42	
Crittenden		270.4	435.2	US 64B east / AR 50 – Crawfordsville	
Crittenden		271.4	436.8	US 64B west – Crawfordsville	
Crittenden		273.0	439.4	AR 147 south – Lehi	
Crittenden	Marion	277.6	446.8	AR 118 south (College Boulevard) to I-40	
Crittenden	Marion	278.3	447.9	I-55 north (US 61 north / US 63 north / US 78 west) / Military Road – Marion, Sunset, Blytheville	Western end of I-55/US 61/US 63/US 78 concurrency; US 64 west follows exit 10
Crittenden	see I-55				
Mississippi River		289.4	465.7	Memphis & Arkansas Bridge; Arkansas–Tennessee line	
Mississippi River		289.4	465.7	I-55 south / US 61 south / US 64 east / US 70 east / US 78 east / US 79 north / SR 1 east – Memphis	Continuation into Tennessee
1.000 mi = 1.609 km; 1.000 km = 0.621 mi

== See also ==
- List of bridges on the National Register of Historic Places in Arkansas
- National Register of Historic Places listings in Crawford County, Arkansas
- National Register of Historic Places listings in Conway County, Arkansas
- National Register of Historic Places listings in Franklin County, Arkansas
- National Register of Historic Places listings in Johnson County, Arkansas
- National Register of Historic Places listings in Pope County, Arkansas
- Special routes of U.S. Route 64, six special routes of US 64 exist in Arkansas

U.S. Route 64
Previous state: Oklahoma	Arkansas	Next state: Tennessee
