= Arkansas Highway 145 =

Designation for four state highways in Northeast Arkansas

Highway 145
- Segments of Highway 145 in red

Route information
- Maintained by ArDOT
- Existed: c. June 1, 1931–present

Section 1
- Length: 15.344 mi (24.694 km)
- South end: AR 269 near Hunter
- North end: US 64 / AR 17 in McCrory

Section 2
- Length: 8.293 mi (13.346 km)
- South end: AR 37 near Pumpkin Bend
- North end: AR 42 near Beedeville

Section 3
- Length: 9.005 mi (14.492 km)
- South end: AR 37 near Beedeville
- North end: AR 14 near Amagon

Section 4
- Length: 5.527 mi (8.895 km)
- South end: AR 367 in Tuckerman
- North end: CR 85 near Tuckerman

Location
- Country: United States
- State: Arkansas
- Counties: Woodruff, Jackson

Highway system
- Arkansas Highway System; Interstate; US; State; Business; Spurs; Suffixed; Scenic; Heritage
← AR 144	→ AR 146

Highway 145 (AR 145, Ark. 145, and Hwy. 145) is designation for four state highways in Northeast Arkansas. The highways are maintained by the Arkansas Department of Transportation (ARDOT).

Two segments were created as state highways in the 1930s to provide system connectivity; with two others added and extended during the 1960s and 1970s during a period of state highway system expansion.

== Route description ==
The ARDOT maintains Highway 115 like all other parts of the state highway system. As a part of these responsibilities, the department tracks the volume of traffic using its roads in surveys using a metric called average annual daily traffic (AADT). ARDOT estimates the traffic level for a segment of roadway for any average day of the year in these surveys. As of 2018, the peak AADT on the highway was 4,600 vehicles per day (VPD) near the northern terminus in McCrory. All other segments were below 1,000 VPD, with most counts below 400 VPD. For reference, the American Association of State Highway and Transportation Officials (AASHTO) classifies roads with fewer than 400 vehicles per day as a very low volume local road.

No segment of Highway 145 has been listed as part of the National Highway System, a network of roads important to the nation's economy, defense, and mobility.

=== AR 269 to McCrory ===
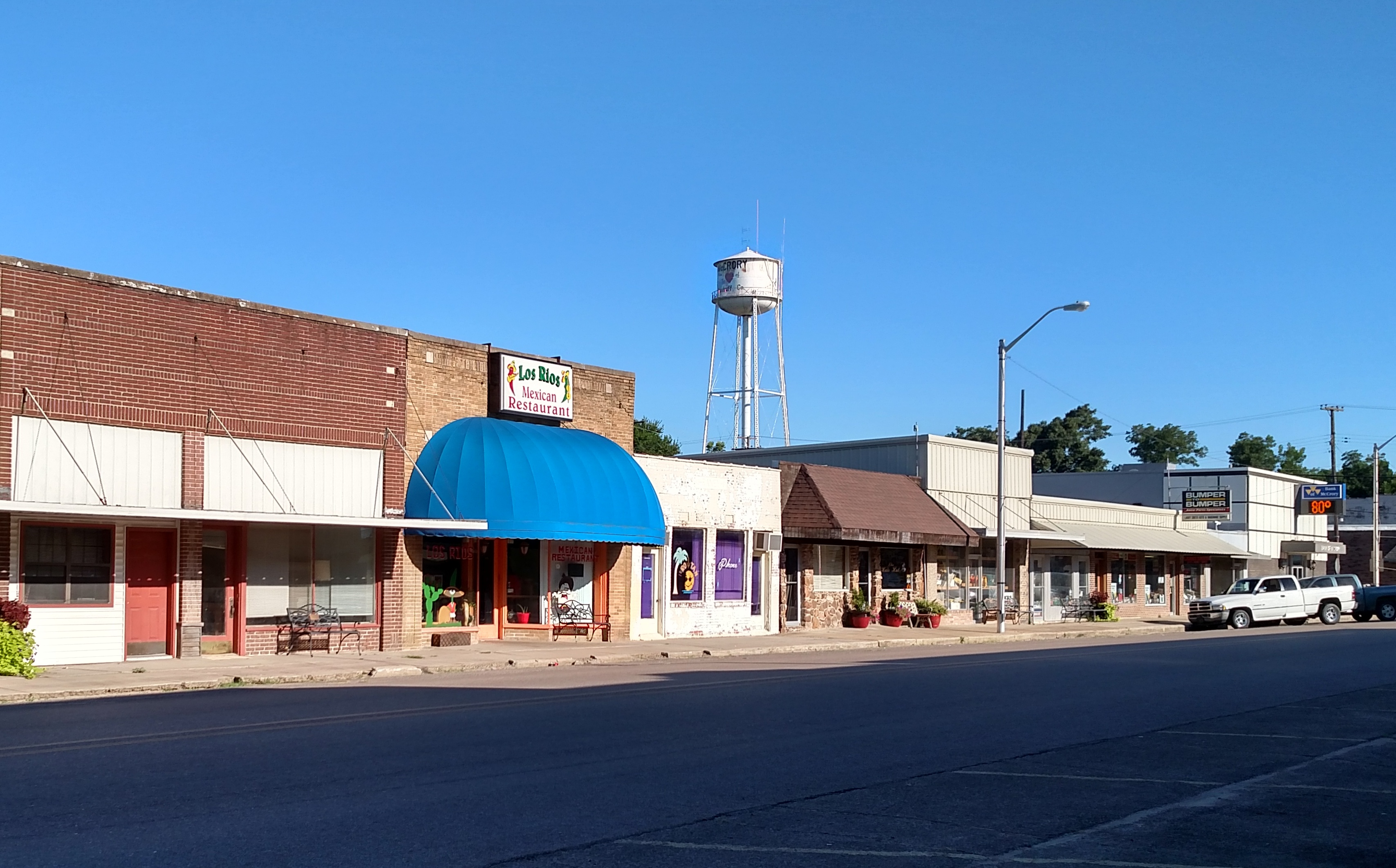
Highway 145 passes through downtown McCrory

Highway 145 begins at a skewed intersection with Highway 269 just west of US Highway 49 (US 49) in the eastern part of Woodruff County. The highway runs west as a section line road through a rural part of the county dominated by row agriculture. Highway 145 turns north before crossing a segment of Bayou DeView known as Reddon Lake, one of the major waterways in the region. The highway continues north through unincorporated communities Beards and Deview before entering the small city of McCrory. Highway 145 becomes Edmonds Avenue in McCrory, running north to an intersection with US Highway 64 Business (US 64B, Raney Avenue), and forming a brief concurrency to Poplar Avenue. After the concurrency ends, Highway 145 crosses the Union Pacific Railway tracks and enters the McCrory Commercial Historic District, listed on the National Register of Historic Places. North of downtown McCrory, Highway 145 passes through a residential area before an intersection with US 64, with the roadway continuing north as Highway 17 to Newport.

=== Woodruff/Jackson counties ===
Highway 145 begins in the northeast corner of Woodruff County at Highway 37. The highway runs due east as a section line road through a rural area, passing the unincorporated community of Duffy before turning north and entering Jackson County. Now a north–south section line road, Highway 145 terminates at Highway 42 near McFadden.

=== Cache River ===
Highway 145 begins at Highway 37 north of the small town of Beedeville and runs west as a section line road. The highway crosses the Cache River, one of the Ramsar wetlands of international importance, and briefly becomes the northern boundary of the Cache River National Wildlife Refuge before turning northeast and running through the unincorporated community of Blackville. Highway 145 continues due north, passing near Remmel before terminating at Highway 14 west of Amagon.

=== Tuckerman to Jackson CR 85 ===
Highway 145 begins at Highway 367 in Tuckerman as Estelle Street in a residential area. The highway turns due north, running as a section line road into rural Jackson County. The highway runs north to a dirt road intersection with Jackson County Road 85 (CR 85, Decker Store Road/Paw Paw Road) near Centerville, where the route terminates near the Black River.

== History ==
The first segment of Highway 145 was created in 1931 between Highway 14 and Highway 37, with the segment between Highway 42 and Highway 37 created in 1935. On February 29, 1956, the Arkansas State Highway Commission (ASHC) designated a third segment of Highway 145 along a newly constructed road between US 64 at Fair Oaks and Penrose parallel to the St. Louis Southwestern Railway tracks. The designation was extended to Highway 39 at Hillemann on October 5, 1960, but this extension was renumbered to Highway 39 (present-day US 49) on December 2, 1964.

A third segment was created from US 64 (present-day US 64B) in McCrory to 3 miles (4.8 km) south on November 23, 1966. It was extended northward to the current northern terminus at Highway 17 when a new US 64 bypass was constructed around Patterson and McCrory on January 24, 1968. The route was extended south to the current southern terminus at Highway 269 on April 25, 1973, pursuant to Act 9 of 1973 by the Arkansas General Assembly. The act directed county judges and legislators to designate up to 12 miles (19 km) of county roads as state highways in each county.

A fourth segment of Highway 145 beginning in Tuckerman was created on February 27, 1974.

== Major intersections ==
Mile markers reset at concurrencies.

County	Location	mi	km	Destinations	Notes
Woodruff		0.000	0.000	AR 269 – Morton	Southern terminus
Woodruff		3.92	6.31	Bridge over Bayou De View	
Woodruff		5.104	8.214	AR 260 west to AR 17	AR 260 eastern terminus
Woodruff	McCrory	14.394	23.165	US 64B east (Raney Avenue)	
Woodruff	McCrory	0.000	0.000	US 64B west (Poplar Avenue) – Patterson	
Woodruff	McCrory	0.950	1.529	US 64 / AR 17 north – Augusta, Wynne, Newport	Northern terminus, AR 17 southern terminus
Woodruff	Gap in route				
Woodruff		0.000	0.000	AR 37	Southern terminus
Jackson		8.293	13.346	AR 42 – Hickory Ridge	Northern terminus
Jackson	Gap in route				
Jackson		0.000	0.000	AR 37 – Beedeville	Southern terminus
Jackson	Cache River NWR	1.14	1.83	Bridge over the Cache River	
Jackson		9.005	14.492	AR 14 – Amagon	Northern terminus
Jackson	Gap in route				
Jackson	Tuckerman	0.000	0.000	AR 367	Southern terminus; former US 67
Jackson		5.527	8.895	CR 85 (Decker Store Road / Paw Paw Road)	Northern terminus
1.000 mi = 1.609 km; 1.000 km = 0.621 mi: Concurrency terminus
