= Arkansas Highway 269 =

State highway in Arkansas, United States

Highway 269

Route information
- Maintained by ArDOT
- Length: 16.94 mi (27.26 km)
- Existed: July 10, 1957–present

Major junctions
- South end: US 49 near Hunter
- US 64 in Morton
- North end: AR 37 near McCrory

Location
- Country: United States
- State: Arkansas

Highway system
- Arkansas Highway System; Interstate; US; State; Business; Spurs; Suffixed; Scenic; Heritage
| ← AR 268 | → US 270 |

Highway 269 (AR 269, Ark. 269, and Hwy. 269) is a state highway in Woodruff County. The route of 16.94 miles (27.26 km) runs from US Highway 49 (US 49) north to Highway 37. The route is maintained by the Arkansas State Highway and Transportation Department (AHTD).

== Route description ==
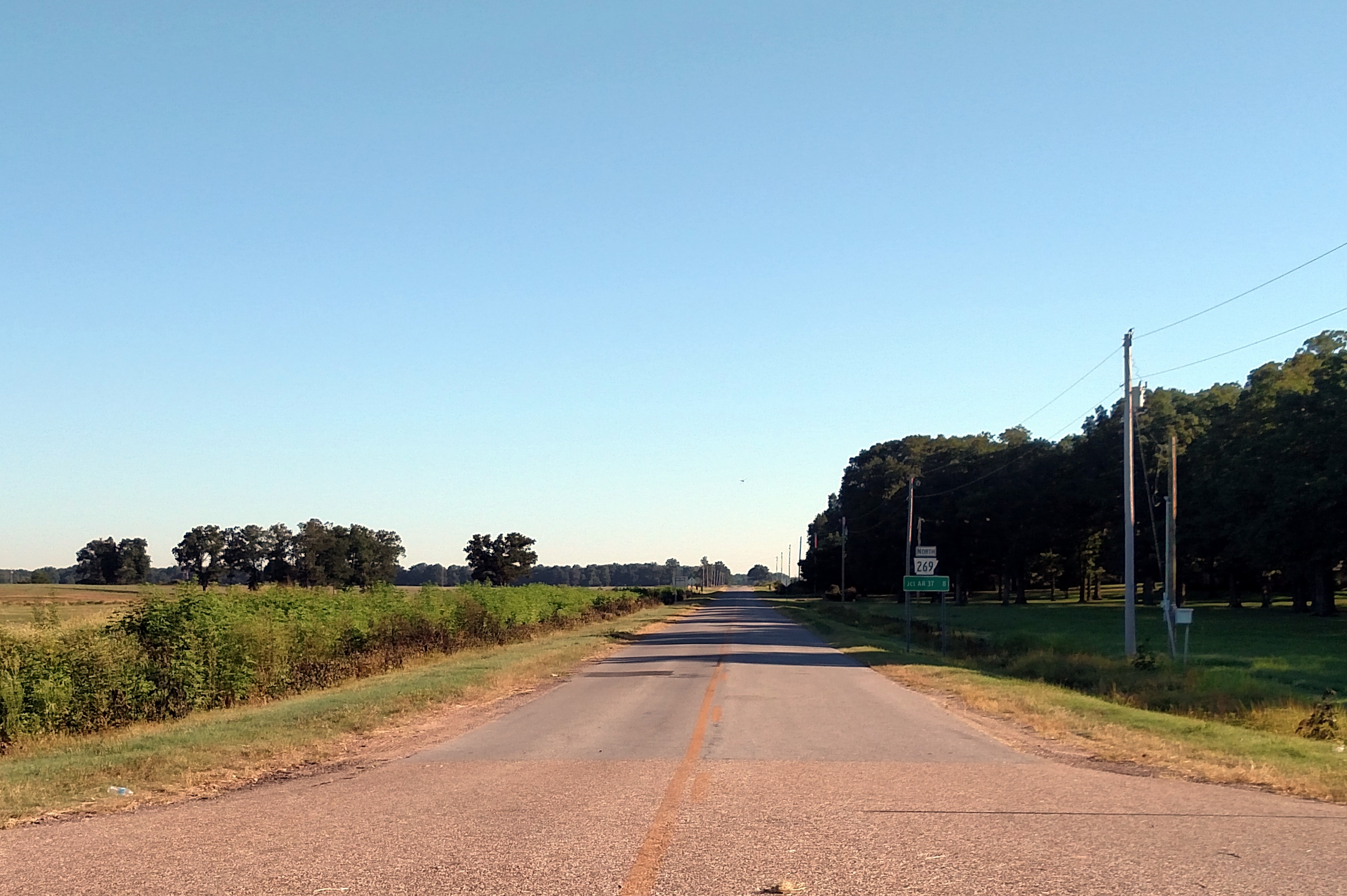
First Highway 269 reassurance marker north of the US 64 concurrency

The highway begins at US 49 in eastern Woodruff County within the Arkansas Delta between Hillemann and Bemis. The route begins due west to an intersection with the southern terminus of Highway 145 before turning due north and running as a section line road through a rural, agricultural area. Highway 269 crosses the Union Pacific Railroad tracks before meeting US 64. These two routes form a concurrency west for 0.5 miles (0.80 km) until Highway 269 turns north toward Pumpkin Bend. The highway crosses Bayou DeView and turns due west at Pumpkin Bend to terminate at Highway 37 near the Cache River National Wildlife Refuge.

== History ==
Highway 269 was created by the Arkansas State Highway Commission on July 10, 1957, by adding a county road between US 64 at Morton and Pumpkin Bend (Note: Minute Order 2233 refers to Pumpkin Bend as "Pumpkin".) to the state highway system. The highway was extended south from US 64 (along the current alignment) on December 2, 1964, replacing a Highway 39 designation when Highway 39 was moved east onto a new alignment (this Highway 39 designation would later be supplanted by US 49, which remains today).

The route was extended west of Pumpkin Bend on June 23, 1965. The westernmost segment of the highway was rerouted in 1967 onto a new, more direct alignment.

== Major intersections ==
The entire route is in Woodruff County.

| Location | mi | km | Destinations | Notes |
|---|---|---|---|---|
| | 0.00 | 0.00 | US 49 – Fair Oaks, Hunter | Southern terminus |
| | 0.75 | 1.21 | AR 145 north – McCrory | AR 145 southern terminus |
| Morton | 8.91– 0.00 | 14.34– 0.00 | US 64 – McCrory, Wynne | |
| | 8.03 | 12.92 | AR 37 – Beedeville, McCrory | Northern terminus |
1.000 mi = 1.609 km; 1.000 km = 0.621 mi
