= Arkansas Highway 193 =

State highway in Arkansas, United States

Highway 193
- AR 193 highlighted in red

Route information
- Maintained by ArDOT
- Length: 17.77 mi (28.60 km)
- Existed: 1965–present

Major junctions
- South end: AR 306 near Caldwell
- US 64
- North end: AR 42 near Hickory Ridge

Location
- Country: United States
- State: Arkansas
- Counties: Cross, St. Francis

Highway system
- Arkansas Highway System; Interstate; US; State; Business; Spurs; Suffixed; Scenic; Heritage
← AR 192	→ AR 195

Arkansas Highway 193 (AR 193, Hwy. 193) is a north–south state highway in northeast Arkansas. The route of 17.77 miles (28.60 km) runs from Highway 306 near Caldwell north across US Route 64 (US 64) through rural Cross County to Highway 42 near Hickory Ridge. The route has an officially designated exception of 0.49 miles (0.79 km) over Highway 284.

== Route description ==
AR 193 begins near Caldwell at Highway 306 in northwest St. Francis County. The route continues north to an officially designated exception of 0.49 miles (0.79 km) with Highway 284. After this overlap, the route continues north to a junction with US 64. The route overlaps with US 64 east for 0.9 miles (1.4 km), after which Highway 193 turns north. Highway 193 has a junction with Highway 364 before it terminates at Highway 42 east of Hickory Ridge.

== History ==
The route was designated a state highway under the jurisdiction of the Arkansas State Highway and Transportation Department (AHTD) between 1965 and 1966. The first segment was only between US 64 and Highway 284, with a northern extension coming in 1967. The route is entirely two–lane undivided most recently paved in 1980.

== Major intersections ==
Mile markers reset at concurrencies.

County	Location	mi	km	Destinations	Notes
St. Francis		0.00	0.00	AR 306 – Colt, Hunter	Southern terminus
Cross		3.53	5.68	AR 284 west to US 49	Officially designated exception
Cross		4.02	6.47	AR 284 east – Wynne	Officially designated exception
Cross		7.54	12.13	US 64 west – Bald Knob	
Cross	US 64 concurrency east, 0.9 miles (1.4 km)				
Cross		0.00	0.00	US 64 east – Wynne, Marion	
Cross		5.00	8.05	AR 364	
Cross		10.23	16.46	AR 42 – Hickory Ridge, Cherry Valley	Northern terminus
1.000 mi = 1.609 km; 1.000 km = 0.621 mi
