= Arkansas Highway 306 =

State highway in Arkansas, United States

Highway 306

Route information
- Maintained by ArDOT
- Existed: April 24, 1963–present

Section 1
- Length: 6.65 mi (10.70 km)
- West end: AR 17 / AR 38 in Cotton Plant
- East end: CR 680 at Becton

Section 2
- Length: 24.27 mi (39.06 km)
- West end: US 49 in Hunter
- East end: AR 284

Section 3
- Length: 5.98 mi (9.62 km)
- West end: CR 825 at the St. Francis River
- East end: AR 75 at Gieseck

Location
- Country: United States
- State: Arkansas
- Counties: Woodruff, St. Francis, Cross

Highway system
- Arkansas Highway System; Interstate; US; State; Business; Spurs; Suffixed; Scenic; Heritage
← AR 305	→ AR 307

Highway 306 (AR 306, Ark. 306, and Hwy. 306) is a designation for three east–west state highways in the Arkansas Delta. One segment of 6.65 miles (10.70 km) runs from Highway 38 in Cotton Plant north to Woodruff County Road 680 (CR 680) at Becton. A second segment of 24.27 miles (39.06 km) runs northeast from US Route 49 (US 49) in Hunter to Highway 284. The third segment runs 5.98 miles (9.62 km) east from Cross CR 825 at the St. Francis River to Highway 75 at Gieseck.

== Route description ==
=== Cotton Plant to Becton ===
The route begins in Cotton Plant near the eastern terminus of Highway 38 near a junction with Highway 17. Highway 306 runs north through cotton country and the community of Shady Grove until meeting Woodruff CR 762 and CR 780, where state maintenance ends. In an extremely rare circumstance, the highway designation continues along CR 780 in name only as an officially designated exception of 2.24 miles (3.60 km). (Note: Map note: Excep. Over Co. Rd.) This overlap ceases at a junction with Highway 17 at which Highway 306 begins again and runs for 0.05 miles (0.080 km) before state maintenance ends again. The roadway continues as CR 680.

=== Hunter to AR 284 ===
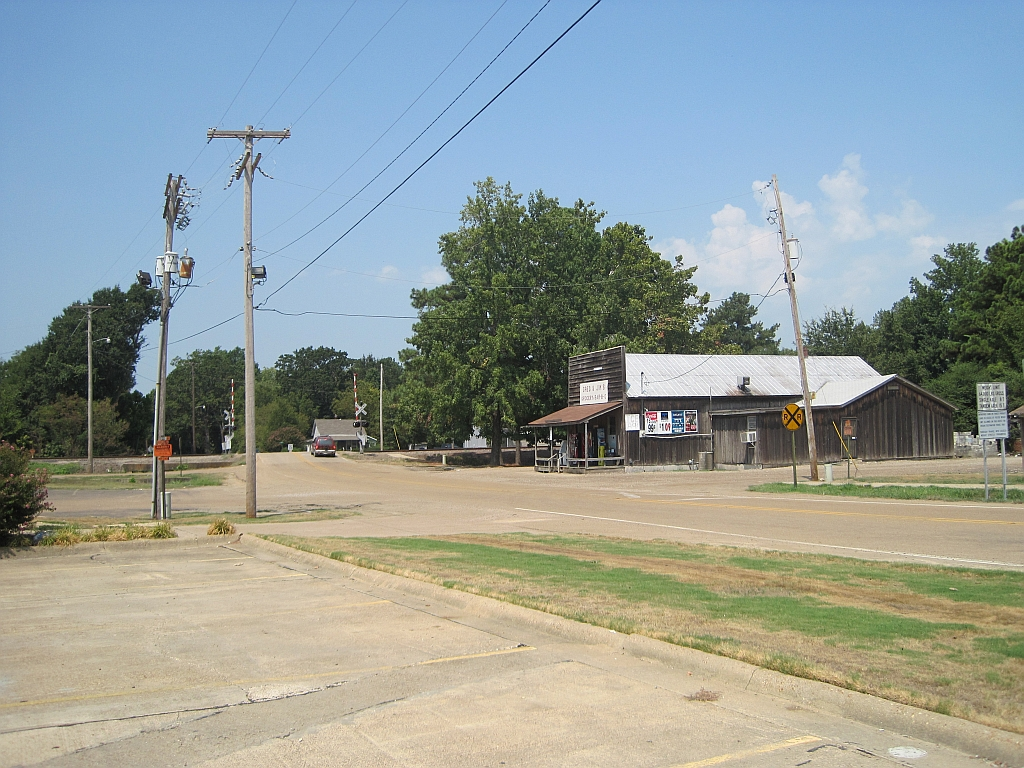
Highway 306 runs as Old Military Road through Colt

Highway 306 begins at the northern town limits of Hunter at US 49. The highway runs east to Holliday before angling northeast and entering St. Francis County. Highway 306 continues northeast, serving as the southern terminus of Highway 259 and passing through the communities of Macedonia and Pine Tree, after which the route begins to curve east. Following an intersection with the southern terminus of Highway 193, the highway intersects Highway 1 in Colt and passes the William Stone House, a property on the National Register of Historic Places. The highway exits Colt heading east and winds through forested areas. The route terminates at Highway 284 near Village Creek State Park and Summer Sweet Lake.

=== St. Francis River to Gieseck ===
Highway 306 begins at Cross CR 825, which runs parallel to the St. Francis River levee. The highway runs due east through center pivot irrigation cropland to terminate at Highway 75 at Gieseck, south of Parkin.

== History ==
The road from Hunter east to the St. Francis county line was designated a state highway on April 24, 1963. The Highway 306 segments running north from Cotton Plant and west from Gieseck were added to the state highway system on November 23, 1966.

== Major intersections ==
County	Location	mi	km	Destinations	Notes
Woodruff	Cotton Plant	0.00	0.00	AR 17 / AR 38 (Main Street)	Western terminus
Woodruff		4.36– 6.60	7.02– 10.62	Gap in state maintenance	Officially designated exception over CR 780
Woodruff	Becton	6.60	10.62	AR 17 – Cotton Plant, Brinkley	
Woodruff	Becton	6.65	10.70	CR 680	End state maintenance, eastern terminus
Woodruff	Highway 306 begins in Hunter				
Woodruff	Hunter	0.00	0.00	US 49 – Brinkley, Fair Oaks	Western terminus
Woodruff		0.4	0.64	AR 78 south – Wheatley	AR 78 northern terminus
St. Francis		7.25	11.67	AR 259 north to AR 284	AR 259 southern terminus
St. Francis		15.10	24.30	AR 193 north	AR 193 southern terminus
St. Francis	Colt	19.52	31.41	AR 1 (Main Street) – Forrest City, Wynne	
St. Francis		24.27	39.06	AR 284 – Forrest City, Wynne	Eastern terminus
St. Francis	Highway 306 begins near the St. Francis River				
Cross		0.00	0.00	CR 825	Western terminus
Cross	Gieseck	5.98	9.62	AR 75 – Parkin	Eastern terminus
1.000 mi = 1.609 km; 1.000 km = 0.621 mi
