= Arkansas Highway 284 =

State highway in Arkansas, United States

Highway 284
- AR 284 highlighted in red

Route information
- Maintained by ArDOT
- Length: 34.83 mi (56.05 km)
- Existed: April 24, 1963–present

Major junctions
- West end: US 49 at Penrose
- AR 193 AR 1 in Wynne; US 64B near Wynne; I-40 in Forrest City
- East end: AR 1B in Forrest City

Location
- Country: United States
- State: Arkansas
- Counties: Woodruff, Cross, St. Francis

Highway system
- Arkansas Highway System; Interstate; US; State; Business; Spurs; Suffixed; Scenic; Heritage
← AR 283	→ AR 285

Highway 284 (AR 284, Ark. 284, and Hwy. 284) is an east–west state highway in Arkansas Delta. The route of 34.83 miles (56.05 km) runs from U.S. Route 49 (US 49) near Fair Oaks east to Highway 1 Business (AR 1B) in Forrest City.

== Route description ==
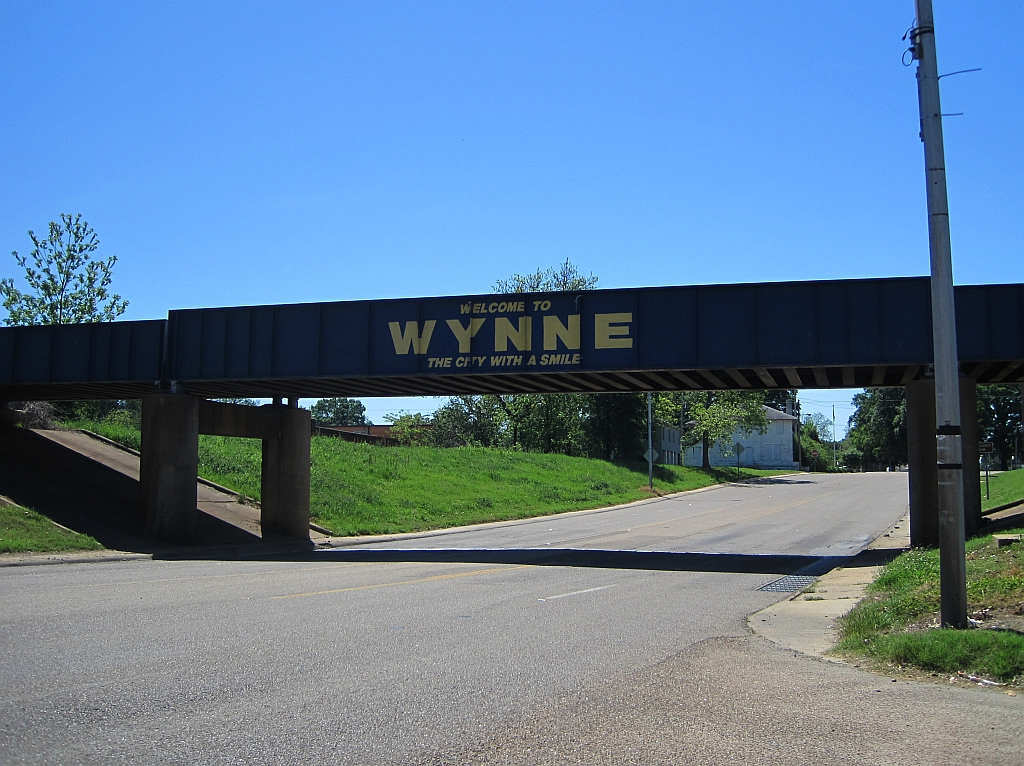
Highway 284 crosses under a railroad in Wynne while concurrent with Highway 1

Highway 284 starts in Forrest City at an intersection with Highway 1B, as Newcastle Road in St. Francis County. It junctions with I-40 at exit 242. It junctions with Highway 306 near Colt a few miles north before crossing the county line. It enters Cross County from the South before joining US 64B and forming a concurrency. When US 64B ends, Highway 284 runs south for less than a quarter of a mile along Highway 1 before continuing westward. After leaving Wynne, the highway intersects Highway 350 and the two run concurrently together southbound before separating. Highway 284 then continues westward to a junction with Highway 193 and those two highways run concurrently southbound together for about one mile (1.6 km). Highway 284 once again return to a westward direction. The highway intersects the northern end of Highway 259 before terminating at US 49 near the Woodruff County line.

== History ==
The highway was created by the Arkansas State Highway Commission on April 24, 1963. The first designation was from present-day Highway 193 east across Highway 1 and US 64C, to a point east of Wynne, where it turned southeast for 2.95 miles (4.75 km) to a county road. Highway 284 was extended west to Highway 39 (now US 49) on June 23, 1965.

A second segment was created from a proposed Forrest City bypass north to the Cross county line on November 23, 1966. The bypass was never built, and the route was extended south in Brinkley over New Castle Road and Arkansas Avenue to the current southern terminus at Highway 1B (Washington Street) on August 26, 1970. The gap between the two routes was closed on December 13, 1972.

On January 8, 1993, following a rerouting around East Arkansas Community College, a minor alignment change resulted in redesignating a former section as Highway 890.

== Major intersections ==
Mile markers reset at some concurrencies.

County	Location	mi	km	Destinations	Notes
Woodruff		0.00	0.00	US 49 – Fair Oaks, Brinkley	Western terminus
Cross		2.60	4.18	AR 259 south – Fair Oaks	AR 259 northern terminus
Cross		8.67– 9.18	13.95– 14.77	AR 193	officially designated exception
Cross	McElroy	13.21	21.26	AR 350 east – Wilkins	Begin AR 350 overlap
Cross		14.12	22.72	AR 350 west	End AR 350 overlap
Cross	Wynne	16.96	27.29	AR 1 south (Falls Boulevard) – Forrest City	Begin AR 1 overlap
Cross	Wynne	See AR 1 and US 64B			
Cross		0.00	0.00	US 64B	End US 64B overlap
Cross		4.95	7.97	AR 600 – Village Creek State Park	
St. Francis		7.14	11.49	AR 306 west – Colt	AR 306 eastern terminus
St. Francis	Forrest City	16.12	25.94	I-40 – Little Rock, Memphis	
St. Francis	Forrest City	17.87	28.76	AR 1B (Washington Street)	Eastern terminus
1.000 mi = 1.609 km; 1.000 km = 0.621 mi: Concurrency terminus
