= Arkansas Highway 331 =

State highway in Arkansas, United States

Highway 331

Route information
- Maintained by AHTD
- Length: 5.28 mi (8.50 km)
- Existed: 1971–present

Major junctions
- South end: AR 247, Pottsville
- US 64, Russellville
- North end: Bradley Cove Rd

Location
- Country: United States
- State: Arkansas
- Counties: Pope

Highway system
- Arkansas Highway System; Interstate; US; State; Business; Spurs; Suffixed; Scenic; Heritage
← AR 330	→ AR 332

Arkansas Highway 331 is a north–south state highway in Pope County, Arkansas. The route runs 5.28 miles (8.50 km) from Arkansas Highway 247 in Pottsville north across Interstate 40 to terminate at the northbound ramps.

== Route description ==
The route begins at AR 247 in Pottsville, and runs west to the Russellville Regional Airport. The route turns north, intersecting AR 980 before forming a concurrency with US 64. After the concurrency ends, AR 331 continues north to cross over Interstate 40 at exit 84. The route terminates after serving the northbound ramps to I-40. The route continues as Bradley Cove Rd. The route is two-lane undivided south of the US 64 concurrency. Main Street is a five-lane road with a center left turn lane, and AR 331 is four-lane north of US 64.

== History ==
The route was first added to the state highway system in 1971. The route was only from US 64 to I-40 until 1974, when AR 331 was extended south to the area around the airport. The route was extended again in 1975, across the railroad tracks to AR 274 in Pottsville. The route south of I-40 was repaved in 1994.

== Major intersections ==
Mile markers reset at concurrencies. The entire route is in Pope County.

Location	mi	km	Destinations	Notes
Pottsville	0.0	0.0	AR 247	Southern terminus
Russellville	3.77	6.07	AR 980 east (E 16th St)	
Russellville	4.77	7.68	US 64 west (E Main St)	
Russellville	US 64 concurrency east, 0.5 miles (0.80 km)			
Russellville	0.0	0.0	US 64 east (E Main St)	
Russellville	0.34	0.55	I-40 – Little Rock, Ft Smith	
Russellville	0.51	0.82	Bradley Cove Rd	Northern terminus
1.000 mi = 1.609 km; 1.000 km = 0.621 mi: Concurrency terminus

== See also ==
- List of state highways in Arkansas
