= Arkansas Highway 350 =

State highway in Arkansas, United States

Highway 350

Route information
- Maintained by ArDOT
- Length: 8.21 mi (13.21 km)
- Existed: November 23, 1966–present

Major junctions
- West end: US 64 near Wynne
- East end: AR 1 at Wilkins

Location
- Country: United States
- State: Arkansas
- Counties: Cross

Highway system
- Arkansas Highway System; Interstate; US; State; Business; Spurs; Suffixed; Scenic; Heritage
← AR 349	→ AR 351

Highway 350 (AR 350, Ark. 350, and Hwy. 350) is an east–west state highway in Cross County, Arkansas. The highway begins at an intersection with US Highway 64 (US 64) runs 8.21 miles (13.21 km) to Highway 1 at Wilkins. Created in 1966, the highway was extended north to the present terminus at US 64 in 1974. The highway is maintained by the Arkansas Department of Transportation (ArDOT).

== Route description ==
The route begins at an intersection with US 64 west of Wynne in the Arkansas Delta. Although even-numbered routes are signed east–west, Highway 350 runs north-south except for the last 2.5 miles (4.0 km). The route is two-lane, undivided, passing through sparsely populated agricultural territory. The highest average daily traffic observed in 2014 was 940 vehicles per day (VPD) on the southern section.

Highway 350 runs due south to an intersection with Highway 284 at the Wynne city limits. The routes form a concurrency south to McElroy, where Highway 284 turns west to Penrose, with Highway 350 continuing due south as a section line road. Highway 350 turns east and intersects Highway 1 south of Wynne 1 mile (1.6 km) north of the St. Francis county line.

== History ==
Highway 350 was created by the Arkansas State Highway Commission between Highway 1 and Highway 284 on November 23, 1966. The highway was extended north to US 64 on February 27, 1974.

== Major intersections ==
Mile markers reset at concurrencies. The entire route is in Cross County.

Location	mi	km	Destinations	Notes
	0.00	0.00	US 64 – Wynne, McCrory	Western terminus
Wynne	2.14	3.44	AR 284 east – Wynne	Begin AR 284 overlap
See AR 284
McElroy	0.00	0.00	AR 284 west – Penrose	End AR 284 overlap
Wilkins	6.07	9.77	AR 1 – Forrest City, Wynne	Eastern terminus
1.000 mi = 1.609 km; 1.000 km = 0.621 mi: Concurrency terminus
