= William Stone House =

Historic house in Arkansas, United States

- U.S. National Register of Historic Places
- Location within Arkansas Location within the United States
- Location: Jct. of AR 306 and Doris Ln., SE corner, Colt, Arkansas
- Coordinates: 35°7′53″N 90°48′37″W
- Area: 1 acre (0.40 ha)
- Architectural style: Late 19th And Early 20th Century American Movements, Colonial Revival, Folk Victorian
- NRHP reference No.: 92001346
- Added to NRHP: October 8, 1992

The William Stone House is a historic house at the southeastern corner of the junction of Arkansas Highway 306 and Doris Lane in Colt, Arkansas. It is a 1 1/2-story wood-frame structure, roughly in an L shape. One leg of the L is on the right side, with a front-gable roof, extending south from the highway. Set slightly back from the front of this section, the second leg of the L extends east, with a hip roof and a porch extending its width with six Tuscan columns for support. The house is a fine local example of Plain Traditional architecture with Folk Victorian and Colonial Revival flourishes.

The house was listed on the National Register of Historic Places in 1992.

== See also ==
- National Register of Historic Places listings in St. Francis County, Arkansas
