= McCrory Commercial Historic District =

Historic district in Arkansas, United States

- U.S. National Register of Historic Places
- U.S. Historic district
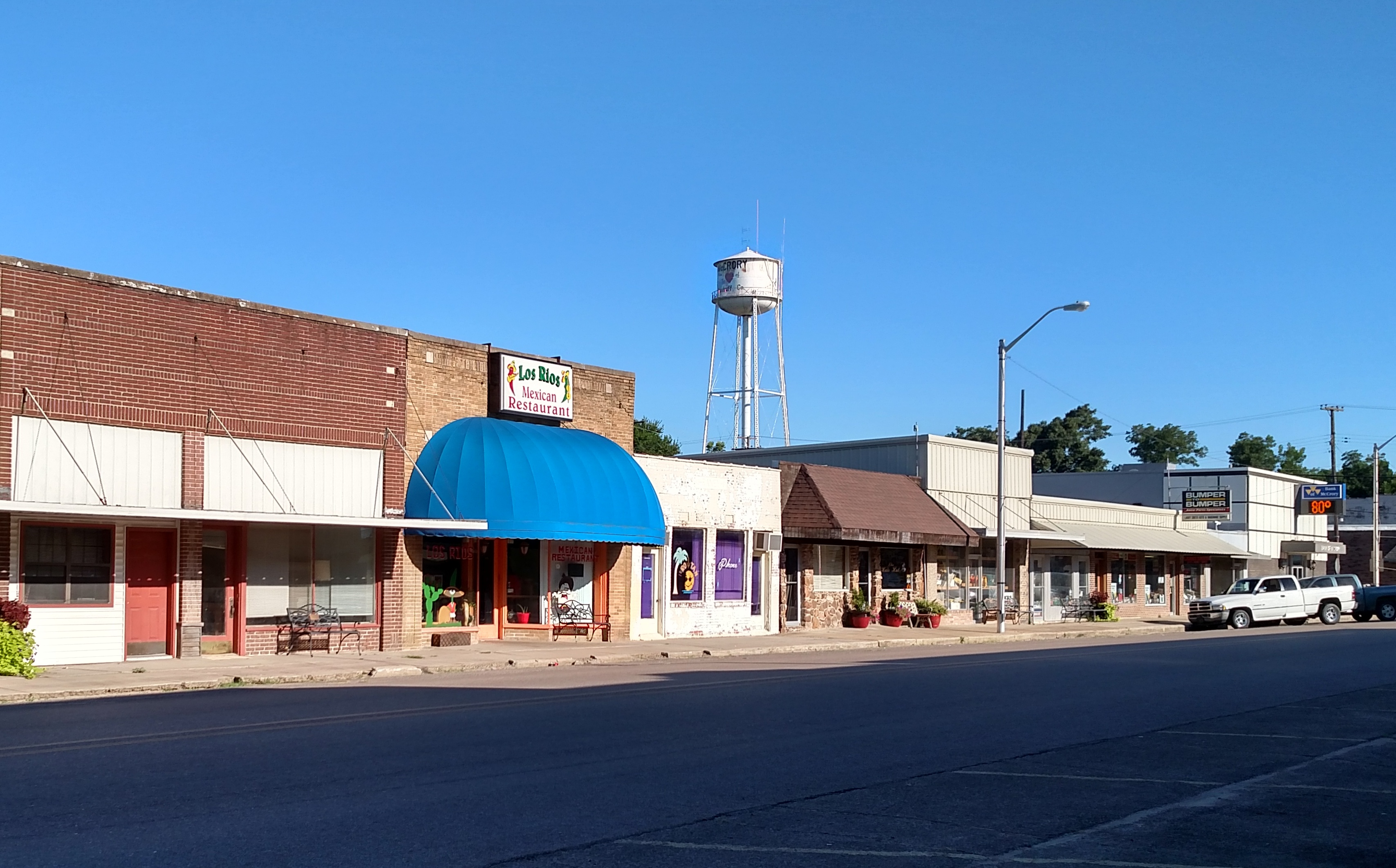

- Location within Arkansas Location within the United States
- Location: Roughly Edmonds Ave. between Railroad & Third Sts., McCrory, Arkansas
- Coordinates: 35°15′26″N 91°12′0″W
- Area: 11 acres (4.5 ha)
- Architectural style: Italianate, Early Commercial, Tapestry brick
- NRHP reference No.: 10000781
- Added to NRHP: September 23, 2010

The McCrory Commercial Historic District encompasses the historic commercial center of the city of McCrory, Arkansas. This area is located along Edmonds Street (Arkansas Highway 145), the city's main north–south thoroughfare. The district includes 26 historically significant buildings in a 2-1/2 block area north of the railroad tracks, including a few buildings facing adjacent streets. McCrory was founded in 1890, and much of its early commercial building stock was wood-frame. Beginning about 1900 use of brick and stone in construction grew, and after a major fire in 1909 most of the buildings were built in brick. The area achieved most of its present appearance by about 1930. Most of the buildings are a single story in height, with a few that are two.

The district was listed on the National Register of Historic Places in 2010.

== See also ==
- National Register of Historic Places listings in Woodruff County, Arkansas
