= McCrory High School =

Location
- 509 Jackson Street; McCrory, Arkansas 72101; United States; 35°15′41″N 91°11′53″W

Information
- Type: Public secondary
- School district: McCrory School District
- NCES District ID: 050960
- CEEB code: 041610
- NCES School ID: 050960000702
- Principal: Lincoln Daniels
- Staff: 33.09 (on FTE basis)
- Grades: 7 to 12
- Student to teacher ratio: 7.65
- Colors: Orange and black
- Athletics conference: 2A 3 (2012-14)
- Mascot: Jaguar
- USNWR ranking: No. 8 (AR); No. 1346 (USA)
- Website: mccroryschools.org

McCrory High School is a secondary school in McCrory, Arkansas, United States. The school is the only secondary school serving grades 7 through 12 in the McCrory School District.

== Academics ==
The assumed course of study follows the Smart Core curriculum developed by the Arkansas Department of Education (ADE), which requires students to complete at least 22 units to graduate. Students complete regular (core and career focus) courses and exams and may select Advanced Placement coursework and exams that provide an opportunity for college credit. The school is accredited by AdvancED since 1965 and by the ADE.

== Extracurricular activities ==
The McCrory High School mascot is the jaguar with orange and black serving as its school colors. For 2012–14, the McCrory Jaguars compete in the 2A Region 2 (Football) Conference under the administration of the Arkansas Activities Association (AAA). Interscholastic activities include baseball, basketball (boys/girls), cheer, football, golf (boys/girls), and softball.

McCrory won its first state championship in 2015, defeating Rison 26–22 on December 11 at War Memorial Stadium in Little Rock. They won an additional state championship in 2021.
