= Rushton Clinic =

- U.S. National Register of Historic Places
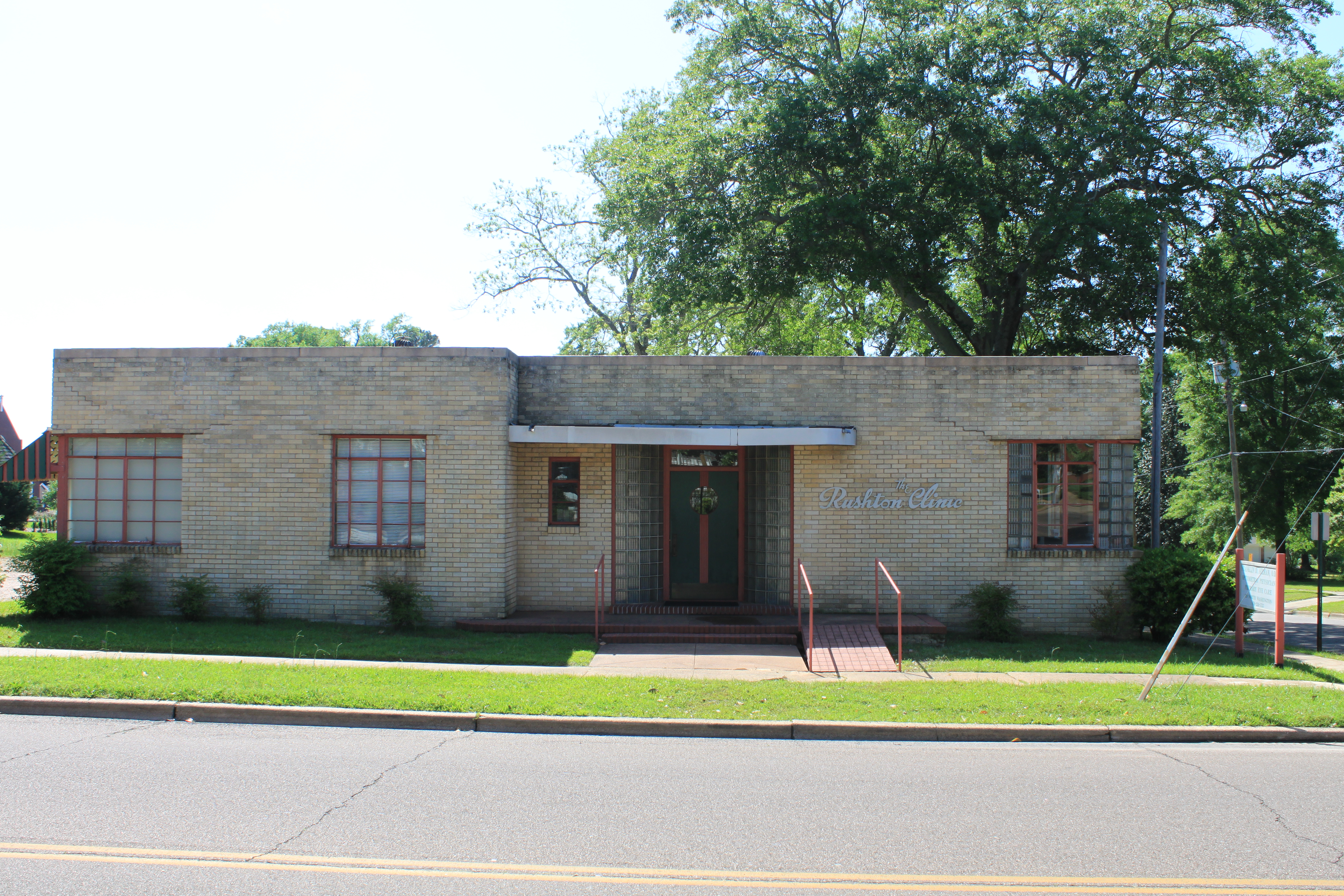

- Location within Arkansas Location within the United States
- Location: 219 North Washington St., Magnolia, Arkansas
- Coordinates: 33°16′09″N 93°14′26″W
- Area: less than one acre
- Built: 1938
- Architectural style: Art Moderne
- NRHP reference No.: 13000316
- Added to NRHP: May 28, 2013

The Rushton Clinic is a historic medical office at 219 North Washington Street in Magnolia, Arkansas. Built in 1938, it is an excellent local example of Art Moderne style. It is a single-story structure, roughly U-shaped, with walls of buff brick and stone or cast concrete coping. Glass blocks are used for accent on the corners and around the door. It was built for Dr. Joe Rushton, who had recently graduated from medical school and sought to establish a practice in the city. He practiced out of this building until his death in 1983.

The building was listed on the U.S. National Register of Historic Places in 2013 for its architecture.

== See also ==
- Dr. John William Morris Clinic: NRHP-listed in Woodruff County, Arkansas
- National Register of Historic Places listings in Columbia County, Arkansas
