= Dr. John William Morris Clinic =

- U.S. National Register of Historic Places
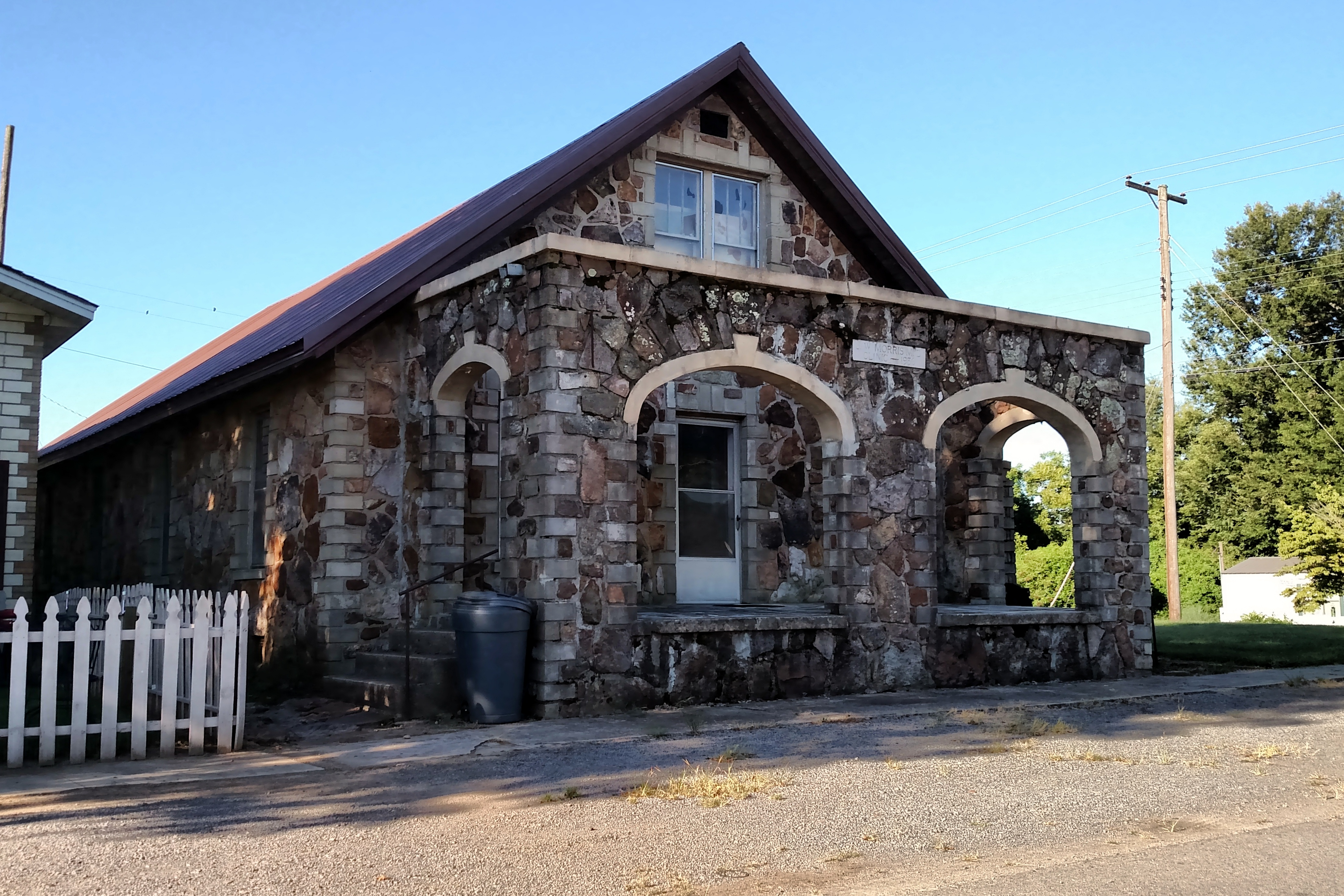

- Location within Arkansas Location within the United States
- Location: 118 W. Main St. McCrory, Arkansas
- Coordinates: 35°15′29″N 91°12′3″W
- Area: 5.9 acres (2.4 ha)
- Built: 1936
- Architectural style: Late 19th And Early 20th Century American Movements, Mixed Masonry
- NRHP reference No.: 09000801
- Added to NRHP: October 5, 2009

The Dr. John William Morris Clinic is a historic professional office building at 118 West Main Street in McCrory, Arkansas. It is a single-story stone and masonry structure with a front-facing gable roof. An arcaded porch extends across part of the front, with concrete keystones and quoining. The building was constructed in 1936 and is in a distinctive variant of Craftsman style. Its significance is derived from its association with Dr. John William Morris, who was for many years the only medical doctor in McCrory and the surrounding area, and gained nationwide notice for serving in his profession until he was 101 years old. He was cited at the time as the oldest practicing physician in the country.

The building was listed on the National Register of Historic Places in 2009.

== See also ==
- Rushton Clinic: NRHP-listed in Columbia County, Arkansas
- National Register of Historic Places listings in Woodruff County, Arkansas
