= Ft. Smith Confederate Monument =

- U.S. National Register of Historic Places
- U.S. Historic district – Contributing property
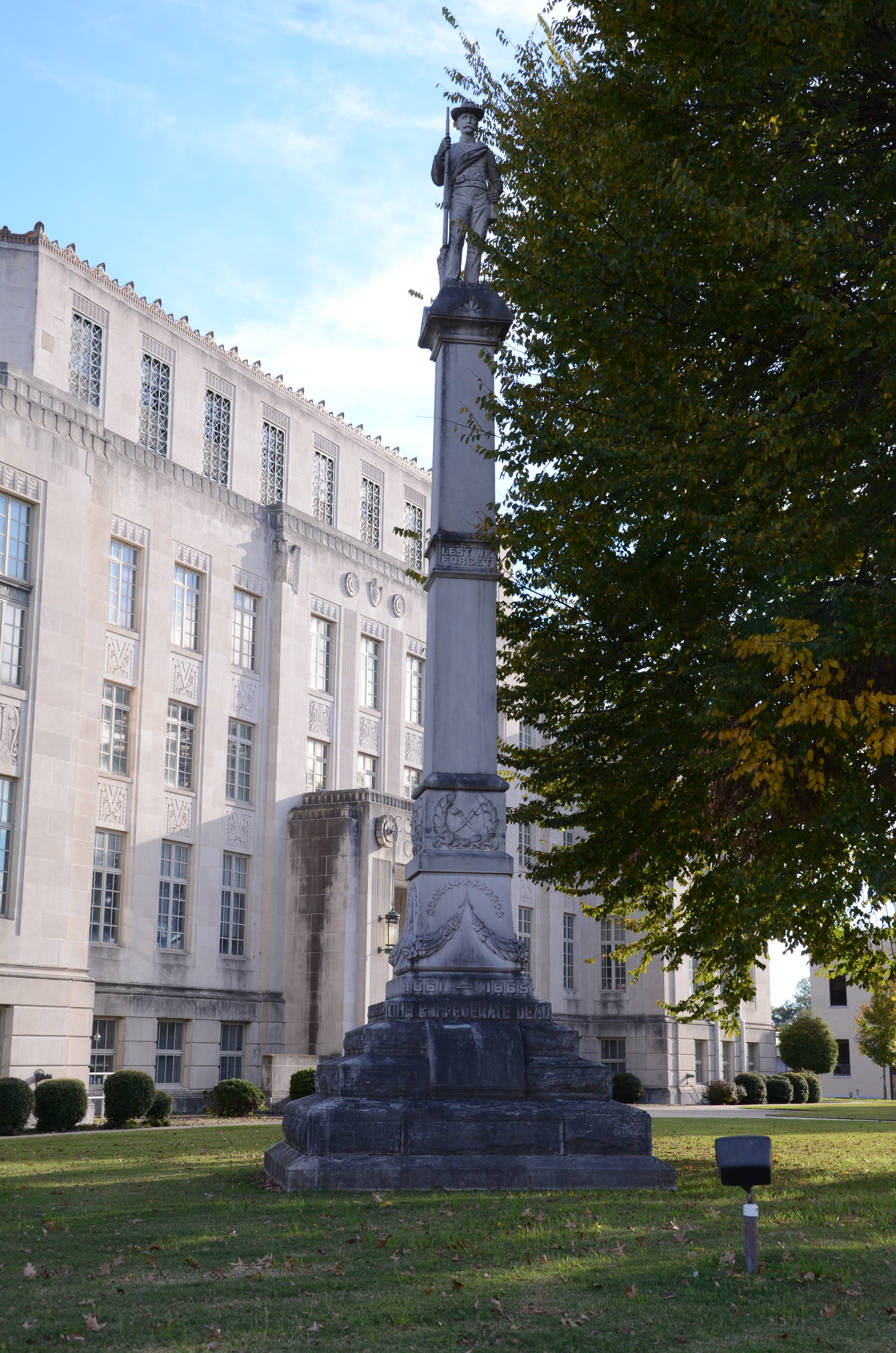

- Location within Arkansas Location within the United States
- Location: Courthouse Lawn, near jct. of 6th St. and Rogers Ave., Ft. Smith, Arkansas
- Coordinates: 35°23′14″N 94°25′40″W
- Area: less than one acre
- Built: 1903
- Architectural style: Classical Revival
- Part of: Sebastian County Courthouse-Ft. Smith City Hall (ID93000848)
- MPS: Civil War Commemorative Sculpture MPS
- NRHP reference No.: 96000460

Significant dates
- Added to NRHP: April 26, 1996
- Designated CP: June 8, 1993

The Ft. Smith Confederate Monument stands on the grounds of the Sebastian County Courthouse at the junction of 6th and Rogers Streets in Fort Smith, Arkansas. The statue depicts a Confederate Army soldier, standing facing north, holding the upper stock of his rifle, which is grounded. The sculpture is 6 feet (1.8 m) in height, and is mounted on a square columnar pedestal over 30 feet (9.1 m) tall. The monument was placed in 1903 with funding raised by the local chapter of the Daughters of the Confederacy. An earlier Confederate memorial, placed at Fort Smith National Cemetery, was destroyed by a tornado, and the federal government objected to the placement of this memorial there without alterations to also commemorate the Union dead. The city granted permission for its placement at its current location.

The monument was listed on the National Register of Historic Places in 1993.

== See also ==
- National Register of Historic Places listings in Sebastian County, Arkansas
