= McCrory School District =

School district in Arkansas, United States

Address
- 509 North Jackson Street McCrory, Arkansas, 72101; United States

District information
- Type: Public
- Grades: PreK–12
- NCES District ID: 0509600

Students and staff
- Students: 570
- Teachers: 51.87
- Staff: 55.32
- Student–teacher ratio: 10.99

Other information
- Website: mccroryschools.org

McCrory School District 12 is a school district in Woodruff County, Arkansas. Their school mascot is the jaguar, specifically Jasper the jaguar. The school's colors are orange and black.

== Schools ==
The District includes:

- McCrory Elementary School
- McCrory High School
