= Russellville Regional Airport =

Airport in Arkansas, United States

- IATA: none; ICAO: KRUE; FAA LID: RUE

Summary
- Airport type: Public
- Owner: City of Russellville
- Serves: Russellville, Arkansas
- Elevation AMSL: 404 ft / 123 m
- Coordinates: 35°15′33″N 093°05′36″W
- Interactive map of Russellville Regional Airport

Runways
Direction	Length		Surface
Direction	ft	m	Surface
7/25	5,094	1,553	Asphalt

Statistics (2007)
- Aircraft operations: 25,100
- Based aircraft: 51
- Source: Federal Aviation Administration

Russellville Regional Airport (ICAO: KRUE, FAA LID: RUE) is a city-owned public-use airport located two nautical miles (3.7 km) southeast of the central business district of Russellville, a city in Pope County, Arkansas, United States. According to the FAA's National Plan of Integrated Airport Systems for 2009–2013, it is categorized as a general aviation facility. It was formerly known as Russellville Municipal Airport.

Although many U.S. airports use the same three-letter location identifier for the FAA and IATA, this facility is assigned RUE by the FAA but has no designation from the IATA

== Facilities and aircraft ==
Russellville Regional Airport covers an area of 307 acres (124 ha) at an elevation of 404 feet (123 m) above mean sea level. It has one runway designated 7/25 with an asphalt surface measuring 5,094 by 75 feet (1,553 x 23 m).

For the 12-month period ending October 31, 2007, the airport had 25,100 aircraft operations, an average of 68 per day: 80% general aviation, 18% air taxi, and 2% military. At that time there were 51 aircraft based at this airport: 90% single-engine, 8% multi-engine and 2% helicopter.

== See also ==
- List of airports in Arkansas
