= McCrory, Arkansas =

- City
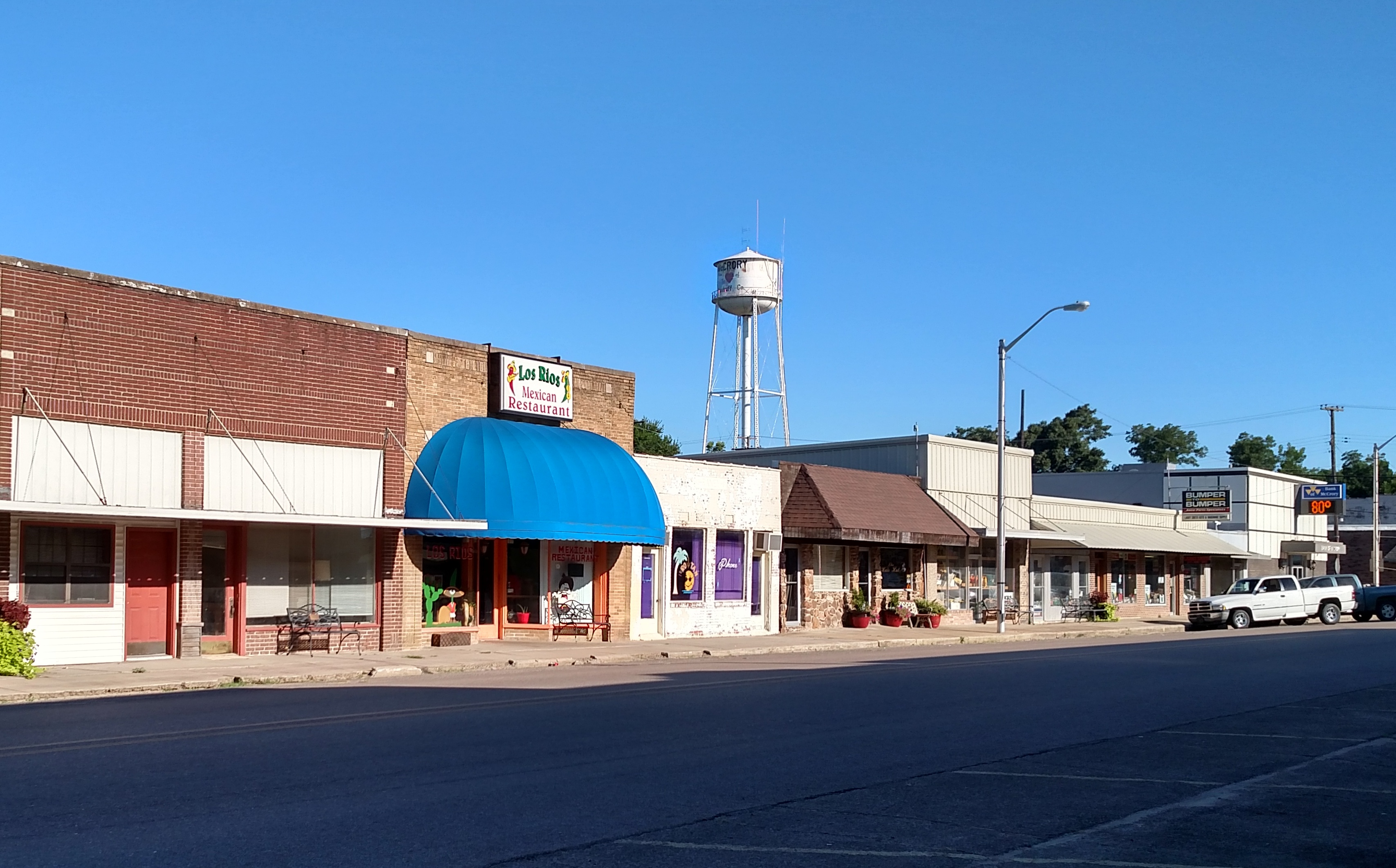
- Motto: The Heart of Woodruff County
- Location of McCrory in Woodruff County, Arkansas.
- Coordinates: 35°15′12″N 91°12′02″W
- Country: United States
- State: Arkansas
- County: Woodruff

Area
  - Total: 2.37 sq mi (6.13 km^{2})
  - Land: 2.37 sq mi (6.13 km^{2})
  - Water: 0 sq mi (0.00 km^{2})
- Elevation: 207 ft (63 m)

Population (2020)
  - Total: 1,583
  - Estimate (2025): 1,440 ▼
  - Density: 668.5/sq mi (258.11/km^{2})
- Time zone: UTC-6 (Central (CST))
  - Summer (DST): UTC-5 (CDT)
- ZIP code: 72101
- Area code: 870
- FIPS code: 05-42500
- GNIS feature ID: 2405046
- Website: cityofmccrory.com

McCrory is a city in Woodruff County, Arkansas, United States. The population was 1,583 at the 2020 census.

The McCrory Commercial Historic District, the McCrory Waterworks, and the Dr. John William Morris Clinic are all listed on the National Register of Historic Places listings in Woodruff County, Arkansas.

== History ==
The town began to get organized when word spread in 1886 that local land had been donated by one Wade McCrory to the St. Louis, Iron Mountain and Southern Railway for their projected route from Memphis, Tennessee to Little Rock. The first train actually arrived the next year, and the town was formally incorporated on January 30, 1890.

Given that another railway called the Batesville and Brinkley Railroad had in the early 1880’s built two miles west of town, local McCrory businessmen in 1906 tried to leverage their railroad connections by creating a tramway running from McCrory directly to the Batesville & Brinkley, at a point originally known as Martin’s Junction, later Jelks, and finally becoming Patterson in 1919. On May 21, 1910, the owners decided to form a fully-fledged railroad called the McCrory and Beedeville Southern Railway. The original plan was to run from McCrory north-northeast to the timber processing town of Beedeville, but this was quickly modified to include an extension west from McCrory to Jelks, replacing the tramway. The line to Jelks was completed around August 1911, along with two miles (to Comers Spur) toward the Beedeville objective. Financial problems occurred almost immediately, but the line was extended about another 4 miles to around Odessa, Arkansas by November 1912, and about another three-and-a-half miles to a point known as Langley Junction by November 1913. This gave the railroad a final line of about eleven-and-a-half miles of track from Jelks to Langley Junction, which was still about three-and-a-half miles short of Beedeville. The railroad went bankrupt and was out of business by 1914, with the rails removed soon after.

== Geography ==
According to the United States Census Bureau, the city has a total area of 2.4 square miles (6.2 km^{2}), all land.

== Demographics ==
Historical population
Census	Pop.	Note	%±
1890	299		—
1900	225		−24.7%
1910	637		183.1%
1920	687		7.8%
1930	924		34.5%
1940	1,010		9.3%
1950	1,115		10.4%
1960	1,053		−5.6%
1970	1,378		30.9%
1980	1,942		40.9%
1990	1,971		1.5%
2000	1,850		−6.1%
2010	1,729		−6.5%
2020	1,583		−8.4%
2025 (est.)	1,440	▼	−9.0%
U.S. Decennial Census

=== 2020 census ===
As of the 2020 census, McCrory had a population of 1,583. The median age was 45.1 years. 21.6% of residents were under the age of 18 and 25.0% of residents were 65 years of age or older. For every 100 females there were 86.5 males, and for every 100 females age 18 and over there were 82.0 males age 18 and over.

0.0% of residents lived in urban areas, while 100.0% lived in rural areas.

There were 682 households in McCrory, of which 29.3% had children under the age of 18 living in them. Of all households, 38.4% were married-couple households, 19.8% were households with a male householder and no spouse or partner present, and 35.3% were households with a female householder and no spouse or partner present. About 34.3% of all households were made up of individuals and 14.6% had someone living alone who was 65 years of age or older.

There were 767 housing units, of which 11.1% were vacant. The homeowner vacancy rate was 1.6% and the rental vacancy rate was 8.1%.

Racial composition as of the 2020 census
Race	Number	Percent
White	1,248	78.8%
Black or African American	229	14.5%
American Indian and Alaska Native	0	0.0%
Asian	8	0.5%
Native Hawaiian and Other Pacific Islander	0	0.0%
Some other race	10	0.6%
Two or more races	88	5.6%
Hispanic or Latino (of any race)	16	1.0%

== Education ==
McCrory provides public education from the McCrory School District including the McCrory High School.
