= Patterson, Arkansas =

- City
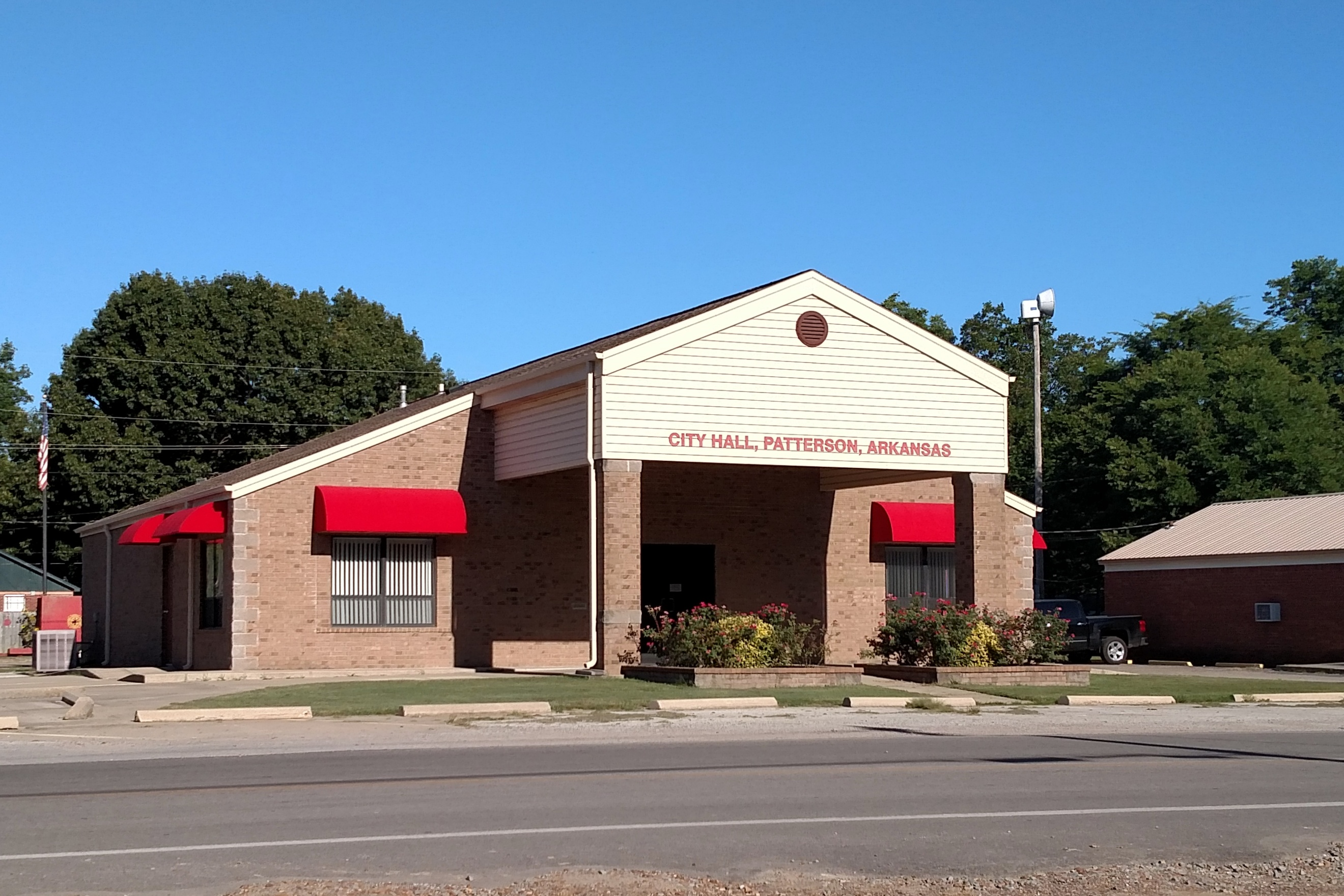

- Location of Patterson in Woodruff County, Arkansas.
- Coordinates: 35°15′18″N 91°14′03″W
- Country: United States
- State: Arkansas
- County: Woodruff

Area
  - Total: 1.13 sq mi (2.93 km^{2})
  - Land: 1.13 sq mi (2.93 km^{2})
  - Water: 0 sq mi (0.00 km^{2})
- Elevation: 200 ft (61 m)

Population (2020)
  - Total: 310
  - Estimate (2025): 282 ▼
  - Density: 274.2/sq mi (105.88/km^{2})
- Time zone: UTC-6 (Central (CST))
  - Summer (DST): UTC-5 (CDT)
- ZIP code: 72123
- Area code: 870
- FIPS code: 05-53990
- GNIS feature ID: 2404487

Patterson is a city in Woodruff County, Arkansas, United States. The population was 310 as of the 2020 Census.

The townsite was originally known as Martin’s Junction, because the junction of the St. Louis, Iron Mountain and Southern Railway with the Batesville and Brinkley Railroad occurred at this spot. The town name later changed to Jelks, and it was briefly the western terminus of a third railroad, the McCrory and Beedeville Southern Railway, which arrived in 1911 but was bankrupt and out of business by 1914. The town name changed again to Patterson in 1919. While the town still has a rail connection, the junction is gone because the successors of the Batesville and Brinkley removed that line around the start of World War II.

== Geography ==
According to the United States Census Bureau, the town has a total area of 2.8 km^{2} (1.1 mi^{2}), all land.

== Demographics ==
Historical population
Census	Pop.	Note	%±
1920	261		—
1930	276		5.7%
1940	284		2.9%
1950	357		25.7%
1960	324		−9.2%
1970	417		28.7%
1980	567		36.0%
1990	445		−21.5%
2000	467		4.9%
2010	452		−3.2%
2020	310		−31.4%
2025 (est.)	282	▼	−9.0%
U.S. Decennial Census

=== 2020 census ===
Patterson Racial Composition
Race	Num.	Perc.
White	247	79.68%
Black or African American	36	11.61%
Native American	2	0.65%
Asian	5	1.61%
Other/Mixed	15	4.84%
Hispanic or Latino	5	1.61%

As of the 2020 United States census, there were 310 people, 207 households, and 120 families residing in the city.

=== 2000 census ===
As of the census of 2000, there were 467 people, 195 households, and 127 families residing in the town. The population density was 163.9/km^{2} (422.9/mi^{2}). There were 237 housing units at an average density of 83.2/km^{2} (214.6/mi^{2}). The racial makeup of the town was 2.23% White, 90.34% Black or African American, 1.28% Native American, 0.21% Pacific Islander, 1.71% from other races, and 0.21% from two or more races. 1.71% of the population were Hispanic or Latino of any race.

There were 195 households, out of which 21.5% had children under the age of 18 living with them, 48.7% were married couples living together, 12.8% had a female householder with no husband present, and 34.4% were non-families. 33.3% of all households were made up of individuals, and 14.9% had someone living alone who was 65 years of age or older. The average household size was 2.39 and the average family size was 3.02.

In the town the population was spread out, with 22.9% under the age of 18, 8.1% from 18 to 24, 24.2% from 25 to 44, 25.1% from 45 to 64, and 19.7% who were 65 years of age or older. The median age was 41 years. For every 100 females, there were 100.4 males. For every 100 females age 18 and over, there were 95.7 males.

The median income for a household in the town was $17,308, and the median income for a family was $21,250. Males had a median income of $25,313 versus $17,750 for females. The per capita income for the town was $12,532. About 24.7% of families and 31.0% of the population were below the poverty line, including 39.4% of those under age 18 and 30.3% of those age 65 or over.
