= Beedeville, Arkansas =

- Town
- Location of Beedeville in Jackson County, Arkansas.
- Coordinates: 35°25′45″N 91°06′39″W
- Country: United States
- State: Arkansas
- County: Jackson

Area
  - Total: 1.14 sq mi (2.95 km^{2})
  - Land: 1.14 sq mi (2.95 km^{2})
  - Water: 0 sq mi (0.00 km^{2})
- Elevation: 217 ft (66 m)

Population (2020)
  - Total: 84
  - Estimate (2025): 81 ▼
  - Density: 73.8/sq mi (28.48/km^{2})
- Time zone: UTC-6 (Central (CST))
  - Summer (DST): UTC-5 (CDT)
- ZIP code: 72014
- Area code: 870
- FIPS code: 05-04720
- GNIS feature ID: 2405227

Beedeville is a town in Jackson County, Arkansas, United States. The population was 84 at the 2020 census.

== Geography ==
Beedeville is located at 35°25′47″N 91°6′31″W (35.429727, -91.108572). According to the United States Census Bureau, the town has a total area of 1.2 square miles (3.0 km^{2}), of which 0.008 square miles (0.02 km^{2}), or 0.50%, is water.

== Demographics ==
Historical population
Census	Pop.	Note	%±
1970	144		—
1980	183		27.1%
1990	141		−23.0%
2000	105		−25.5%
2010	107		1.9%
2020	84		−21.5%
2025 (est.)	81	▼	−3.6%
U.S. Decennial Census

As of the census of 2000, there were 105 people, 43 households, and 30 families residing in the town. The population density was 33.2 people/km^{2} (86 people/mi^{2}). There were 58 housing units at an average density of 18.4 units/km^{2} (48 units/mi^{2}). The racial makeup of the town was 95.24% White, 3.81% Black or African American and 0.95% Native American.

There were 43 households, out of which 39.5% had children under the age of 18 living with them, 60.5% were married couples living together, 2.3% had a female householder with no husband present, and 30.2% were non-families. 23.3% of all households were made up of individuals, and 9.3% had someone living alone who was 65 years of age or older. The average household size was 2.44 and the average family size was 2.83.

In the town, the population was spread out, with 29.5% under the age of 18, 7.6% from 18 to 24, 30.5% from 25 to 44, 19.0% from 45 to 64, and 13.3% who were 65 years of age or older. The median age was 34 years. For every 100 females, there were 101.9 males. For every 100 females age 18 and over, there were 111.4 males.

The median income for a household in the town was $34,375, and the median income for a family was $37,500. Males had a median income of $24,500 versus $11,607 for females. The per capita income for the town was $24,995. There were 15.4% of families and 10.9% of the population living below the poverty line, including 14.3% of under eighteens and 4.8% of those over 64.

== Climate ==
The climate in this area is characterized by hot, humid summers and generally mild to cool winters. According to the Köppen Climate Classification system, Beedeville has a humid subtropical climate, abbreviated "Cfa" on climate maps.

Climate data for Beedeville, Arkansas, 1991–2020 normals, extremes 1964–present
Month	Jan	Feb	Mar	Apr	May	Jun	Jul	Aug	Sep	Oct	Nov	Dec	Year
Record high °F (°C)	75 (24)	80 (27)	88 (31)	97 (36)	95 (35)	104 (40)	112 (44)	107 (42)	105 (41)	96 (36)	87 (31)	78 (26)	112 (44)
Mean daily maximum °F (°C)	46.6 (8.1)	52.3 (11.3)	61.2 (16.2)	71.4 (21.9)	80.0 (26.7)	87.5 (30.8)	90.1 (32.3)	88.5 (31.4)	83.1 (28.4)	73.3 (22.9)	59.8 (15.4)	49.5 (9.7)	70.3 (21.3)
Daily mean °F (°C)	38.7 (3.7)	43.2 (6.2)	51.3 (10.7)	61.0 (16.1)	70.2 (21.2)	78.2 (25.7)	80.9 (27.2)	78.7 (25.9)	72.1 (22.3)	61.7 (16.5)	50.2 (10.1)	41.5 (5.3)	60.6 (15.9)
Mean daily minimum °F (°C)	30.7 (−0.7)	34.1 (1.2)	41.4 (5.2)	50.7 (10.4)	60.5 (15.8)	68.9 (20.5)	71.7 (22.1)	68.9 (20.5)	61.2 (16.2)	50.1 (10.1)	40.7 (4.8)	33.5 (0.8)	51.0 (10.6)
Record low °F (°C)	−6 (−21)	−7 (−22)	11 (−12)	26 (−3)	34 (1)	47 (8)	53 (12)	48 (9)	33 (1)	25 (−4)	12 (−11)	−5 (−21)	−7 (−22)
Average precipitation inches (mm)	3.76 (96)	3.74 (95)	5.32 (135)	5.56 (141)	5.65 (144)	3.55 (90)	3.98 (101)	3.04 (77)	3.02 (77)	4.14 (105)	4.41 (112)	4.90 (124)	51.07 (1,297)
Average snowfall inches (cm)	0.4 (1.0)	0.6 (1.5)	0.5 (1.3)	0.0 (0.0)	0.0 (0.0)	0.0 (0.0)	0.0 (0.0)	0.0 (0.0)	0.0 (0.0)	0.0 (0.0)	0.1 (0.25)	0.1 (0.25)	1.7 (4.3)
Average precipitation days (≥ 0.01 in)	6.2	5.9	7.8	7.4	7.7	5.6	5.3	4.7	4.5	6.8	7.1	7.3	76.3
Average snowy days (≥ 0.1 in)	0.2	0.3	0.2	0.0	0.0	0.0	0.0	0.0	0.0	0.0	0.0	0.0	0.7
Source 1: NOAA
Source 2: xmACIS2

== Education ==
Newport School District operates public schools. The Beedeville School District consolidated into the Newport School District on July 1, 1985.
