= Colt, Arkansas =

- Town
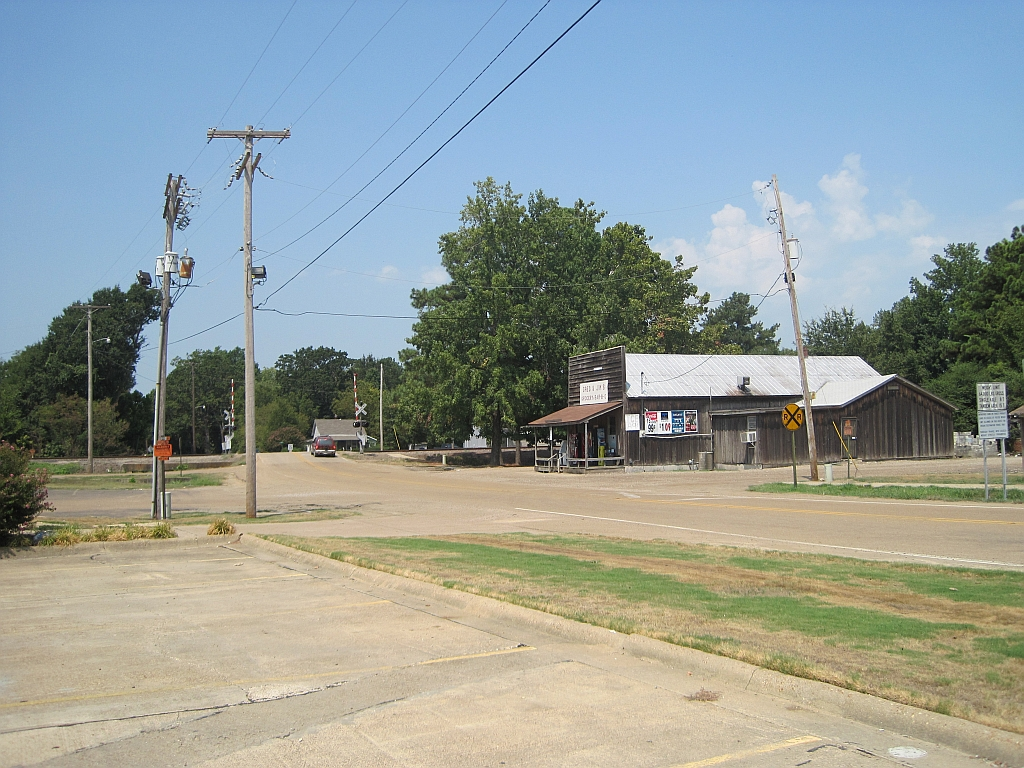
- Old Military Road, Colt

- Location of Colt in St. Francis County, Arkansas.
- Coordinates: 35°07′41″N 90°48′49″W
- Country: United States
- State: Arkansas
- County: St. Francis

Area
  - Total: 1.26 sq mi (3.26 km^{2})
  - Land: 1.26 sq mi (3.26 km^{2})
  - Water: 0 sq mi (0.00 km^{2})
- Elevation: 253 ft (77 m)

Population (2020)
  - Total: 293
  - Estimate (2025): 283 ▼
  - Density: 233/sq mi (89.9/km^{2})
- Time zone: UTC-6 (Central (CST))
  - Summer (DST): UTC-5 (CDT)
- FIPS code: 05-14950
- GNIS feature ID: 2404104

Colt is a town in St. Francis County, Arkansas, United States. The population was 293 at the 2020 census, a decrease from 378 in 2010.

== Geography ==
According to the United States Census Bureau, the town has a total area of 1.2 square miles (3.1 km^{2}), all land.

== Demographics ==
Historical population
Census	Pop.	Note	%±
1920	265		—
1930	267		0.8%
1940	259		−3.0%
1950	267		3.1%
1960	394		47.6%
1970	301		−23.6%
1980	378		25.6%
1990	334		−11.6%
2000	368		10.2%
2010	378		2.7%
2020	293		−22.5%
2025 (est.)	283	▼	−3.4%
U.S. Decennial Census

At the 2000 census, there were 368 people, 163 households and 111 families residing in the town. The population density was 295.2 inhabitants per square mile (114.0/km^{2}). There were 188 housing units at an average density of 150.8 per square mile (58.2/km^{2}). The racial makeup of the town was 94.02% White, 5.43% Black or African American, 0.54% from other races. 0.54% of the population were Hispanic or Latino of any race.

There were 163 households, of which 27.6% had children under the age of 18 living with them, 55.8% were married couples living together, 7.4% had a female householder with no husband present, and 31.9% were non-families. 30.1% of all households were made up of individuals, and 13.5% had someone living alone who was 65 years of age or older. The average household size was 2.26 and the average family size was 2.77.

Age distribution was 22.8% under the age of 18, 9.2% from 18 to 24, 29.3% from 25 to 44, 24.7% from 45 to 64, and 13.9% who were 65 years of age or older. The median age was 38 years. For every 100 females, there were 94.7 males. For every 100 females age 18 and over, there were 94.5 males.

The median household income was $31,250, and the median family income was $37,000. Males had a median income of $31,000 versus $19,375 for females. The per capita income for the town was $14,958. About 11.7% of families and 13.7% of the population were below the poverty line, including 19.5% of those under age 18 and 15.9% of those age 65 or over.

== Transportation ==
The main Highways of Colt are Arkansas State Routes 1 and 306. The two routes cross each other in the middle of the town. The Delta Regional Airport serves as the city's primary airport. Rail Service is provided by the Union Pacific.

== Education ==
Forrest City School District operates public schools serving the community. Forrest City High School is the local high school.

== Notable people ==
- Abraham Miller—Member of the Arkansas State House of Representatives
- Charlie Rich—multiple Grammy Award winning country artist was born in Colt.
