= Hunter, Arkansas =

- Town
- Location of Hunter in Woodruff County, Arkansas.
- Coordinates: 35°3′15″N 91°7′34″W
- Country: United States
- State: Arkansas
- County: Woodruff

Area
  - Total: 0.62 sq mi (1.60 km^{2})
  - Land: 0.62 sq mi (1.60 km^{2})
  - Water: 0 sq mi (0.00 km^{2})
- Elevation: 210 ft (64 m)

Population (2020)
  - Total: 103
  - Estimate (2025): 99 ▼
  - Density: 166.6/sq mi (64.33/km^{2})
- Time zone: UTC-6 (Central (CST))
  - Summer (DST): UTC-5 (CDT)
- ZIP code: 72074
- Area code: 870
- FIPS code: 05-33910
- GNIS feature ID: 0057960

Hunter is a town in southeast Woodruff County, Arkansas, United States. The population was 103 as of the 2020 Census.

Gilbert G. Collier, awarded the Medal of Honor for his action in the Korean War, was born in Hunter.

== Geography ==
Hunter is located at 35°3′15″N 91°7′34″W (35.054256, -91.126122).

Hunter is bisected by US Route 49 and US Route 63, which run concurrently through the town, and it sits alongside both State Highway 78 and State Highway 306.

According to the United States Census Bureau, the town has a total area of 1.6 km^{2} (0.62 sq mi), all land.

== Demographics ==
Historical population
Census	Pop.	Note	%±
1910	508		—
1920	343		−32.5%
1930	293		−14.6%
1940	335		14.3%
1950	286		−14.6%
1960	202		−29.4%
1970	131		−35.1%
1980	170		29.8%
1990	137		−19.4%
2000	152		10.9%
2010	105		−30.9%
2020	103		−1.9%
2025 (est.)	99	▼	−3.9%
U.S. Decennial Census

As of the census of 2000, there were 152 people, 58 households, and 46 families residing in the town. The population density was 93.2 people/km^{2} (241 people/mi^{2}). There were 77 housing units at an average density of 47.2 units/km^{2} (122 units/mi^{2}). The racial makeup of the town was 97.37% White, 1.32% Black or African American, 0.66% Native American, and 0.66% from two or more races.

There were 58 households, out of which 31.0% had children under the age of 18 living with them, 69.0% were married couples living together, 8.6% had a female householder with no husband present, and 19.0% were non-families. 17.2% of all households were made up of individuals, and 5.2% had someone living alone who was 65 years of age or older. The average household size was 2.62 and the average family size was 2.98.

In the town, the population was spread out, with 25.0% under the age of 18, 7.2% from 18 to 24, 24.3% from 25 to 44, 24.3% from 45 to 64, and 19.1% who were 65 years of age or older. The median age was 42 years. For every 100 females, there were 111.1 males. For every 100 females age 18 and over, there were 100.0 males.

The median income for a household in the town was $22,500, and the median income for a family was $32,500. Males had a median income of $25,750 versus $13,438 for females. The per capita income for the town was $28,172. About 10.4% of families and 16.2% of the population were below the poverty line, including 20.0% of those under the age of 18 and 15.2% of those 65 or over.

== Education ==
Public education for early childhood, elementary and secondary school students is provided by the Augusta School District, which leads to graduation from Augusta High School.
