= Fair Oaks, Arkansas =

Fair Oaks
- Census-designated place
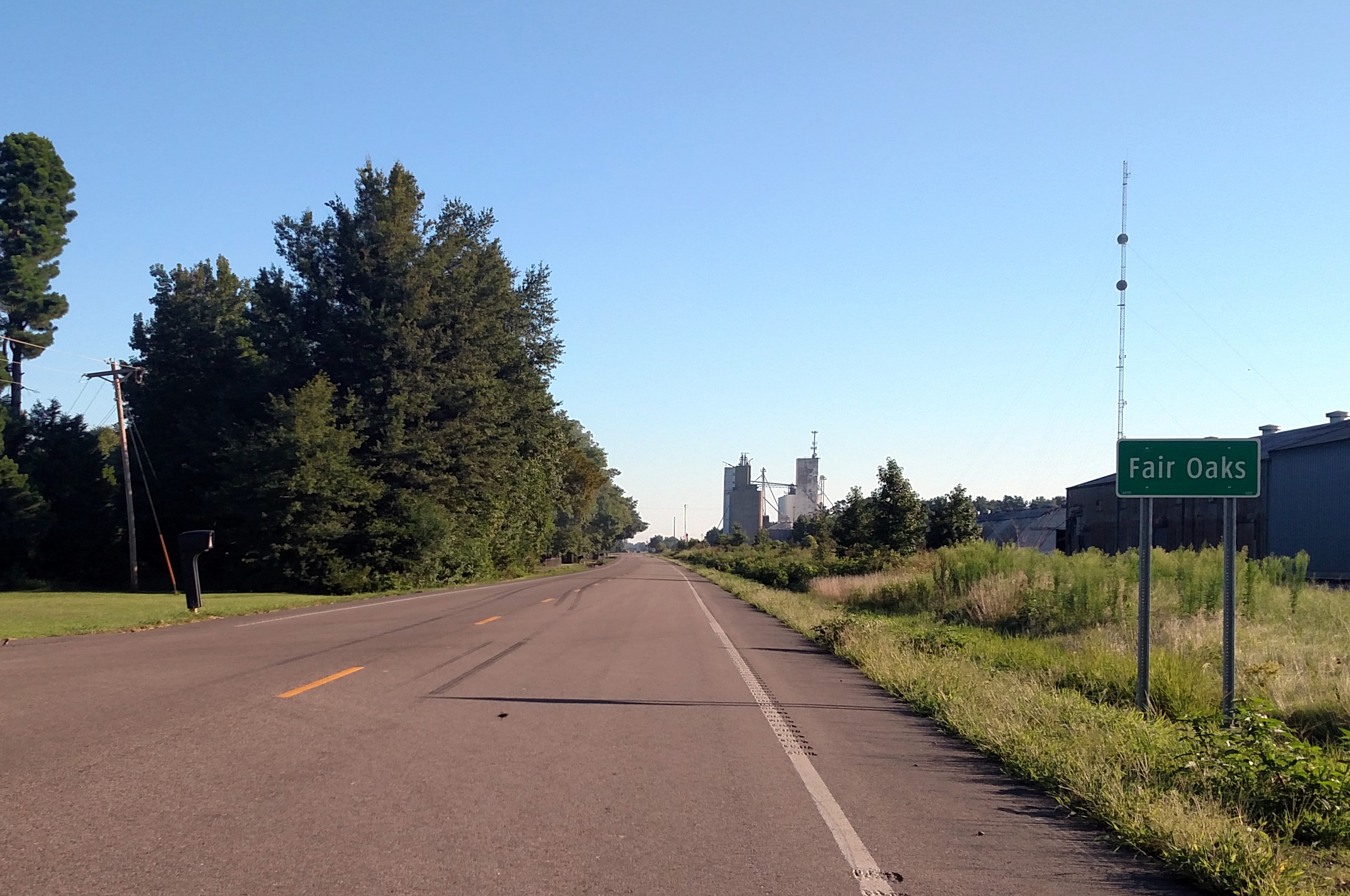

- Fair Oaks' position in Arkansas. Fair Oaks (the United States)
- Coordinates: 35°15′16″N 91°01′54″W
- Country: United States
- State: Arkansas
- County: Cross
- Elevation: 217 ft (66 m)

Population (2020)
  - Total: 55
- Time zone: UTC-6 (Central (CST))
  - Summer (DST): UTC-5 (CDT)
- GNIS feature ID: 2805642

Fair Oaks (also Fairoaks and Fair Oakes) is an unincorporated community and census-designated place (CDP) in Cross County, Arkansas, United States. It was first listed as a CDP in the 2020 census with a population of 55.

== Demographics ==
=== 2020 census ===
Fair Oaks CDP, Arkansas – Racial and ethnic composition Note: the US Census treats Hispanic/Latino as an ethnic category. This table excludes Latinos from the racial categories and assigns them to a separate category. Hispanics/Latinos may be of any race.
Race / Ethnicity (NH = Non-Hispanic)	Pop 2020	% 2020
White alone (NH)	50	90.90%
Black or African American alone (NH)	0	0.00%
Native American or Alaska Native alone (NH)	0	0.00%
Asian alone (NH)	0	0.00%
Pacific Islander alone (NH)	0	0.00%
Some Other Race alone (NH)	0	0.00%
Mixed Race or Multi-Racial (NH)	4	7.27%
Hispanic or Latino (any race)	1	1.82%
Total	55	100.00%

Historical population
Census	Pop.	Note	%±
2020	55		—
U.S. Decennial Census; 2020
