= Crowley's Ridge Parkway =

Crowley's Ridge Parkway

Route information
- Maintained by National Park Service
- Length: 212.0 mi (341.2 km)
- Existed: 1997–present

Major junctions
- South end: US 49 in Helena-West Helena, AR
- US 79 in Marianna, AR; US 70 in Forrest City, AR; I-40 / US 63 in Forrest City, AR; US 64 in Wynne, AR; I-555 / US 49 / US 63 in Jonesboro, AR; US 412 near Paragould, AR; US 62 in McDougal, AR
- North end: Route 25 Bus. in Malden, MO

Location
- Country: United States
- States: Arkansas, Missouri
- Counties: Arkansas; Phillps; Lee; Cross; Poinsett; Craighead; Greene; Clay; Missouri; Dunklin

Highway system
- Scenic Byways; National; National Forest; BLM; NPS
- Arkansas Highway System; Interstate; US; State; Business; Spurs; Suffixed; Scenic; Heritage
- Missouri State Highway System; Interstate; US; State; Supplemental

Crowley's Ridge Parkway is a 212.0-mile-long (341.2 km) National Scenic Byway in northeast Arkansas and the Missouri Bootheel along Crowley's Ridge in the United States. Motorists can access the parkway from US Route 49 (US 49) at its southern terminus near the Helena Bridge over the Mississippi River outside Helena-West Helena, Arkansas, or from Missouri Route 25 (Route 25) near Kennett, Missouri. The parkway runs along Crowley's Ridge, a unique geological formation, and also parts of the St. Francis National Forest, the Mississippi River and the Mississippi Alluvial Plain. Along the route are many National Register of Historic Places properties, Civil War battlefields, parks, and other archeological and culturally significant points.

Crowley's Ridge Parkway is not a separately designated route, but a collection of United States highways, Arkansas state highways, Missouri state routes, Missouri supplemental routes, Arkansas state highway business routes, county roads, and city streets. The route also briefly overlaps the Great River Road in Arkansas. The parkway was designated as an Arkansas Scenic Byway in 1997 as a motor route which allowed the traveler to experience the Southern heritage of the area. The National Scenic Byway designation came the following year, with an extension into Missouri in 2000.

== Route description ==
=== Arkansas ===
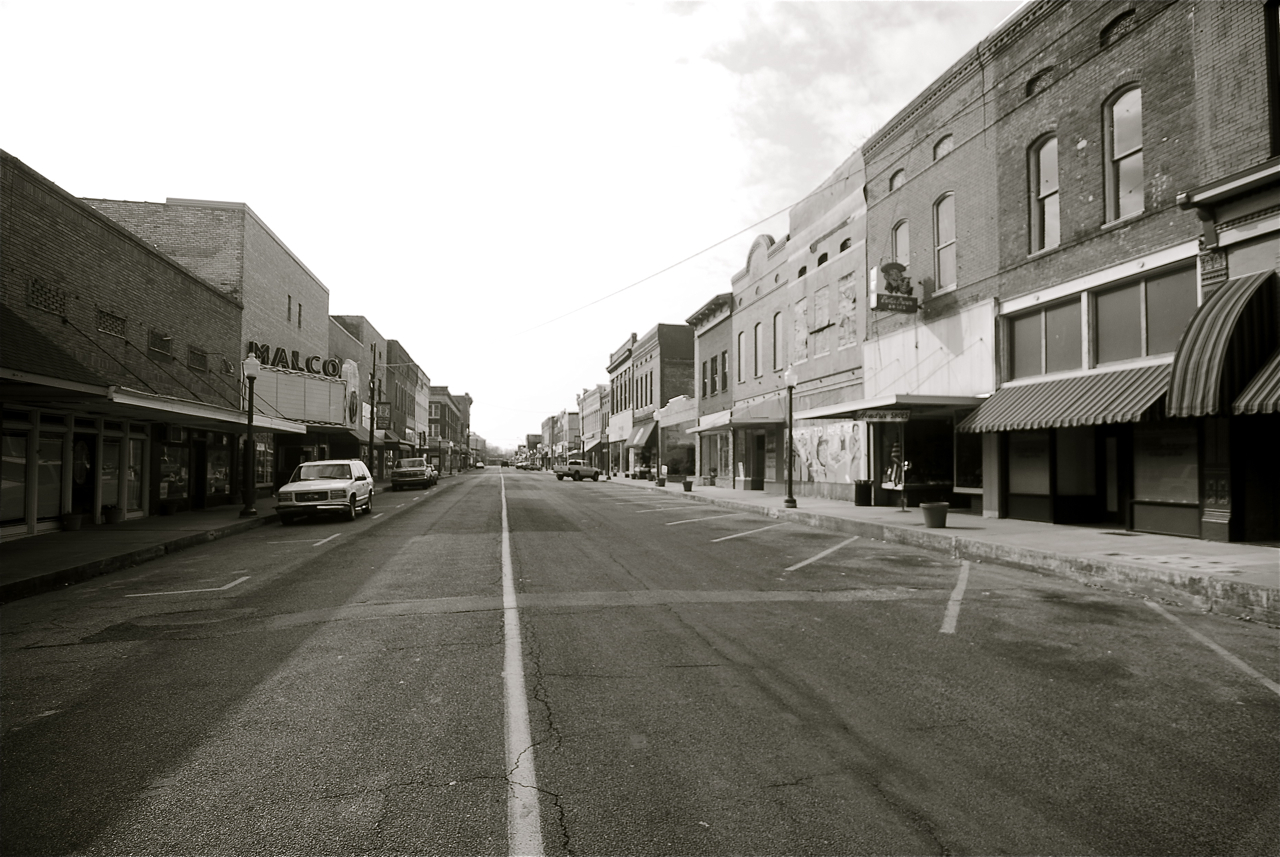
Cherry Street carries Crowley's Ridge Parkway through downtown Helena, Arkansas and the Cherry Street Historic District.

The majority of the route is in Arkansas, and the parkway begins in Phillips County, Arkansas, in Helena-West Helena very near the Helena Bridge over the Mississippi River. Beginning at US Route 49 (US 49) and running north with US 49 Business (US 49B), the route passes historic properties including the Delta Cultural Center, the Jerome Bonaparte Pillow House, the Perry Street Historic District and the site of the Battle of Helena, an American Civil War battle fought in 1863. Upon entering the center of Helena, the byway splits from US 49B and winds along city streets before again following US 49B to West Helena. The parkway turns onto Highway 242 (AR 242) headed north out of town into the St. Francis National Forest, where it turns onto Storm Creek Road (County Route 217, CR 217). Winding through the forest as a narrow two-lane road, the parkway passes Storm Creek Lake and enters Lee County (now following CR 217).

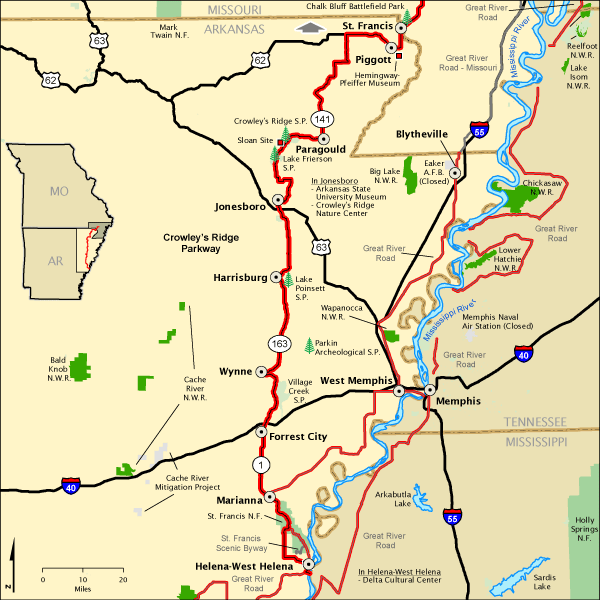
Map of the Arkansas section of Crowley's Ridge Parkway

The route continues north onto CR 221 and later CR 239 when it meets Highway 44 near Bear Creek Lake. Following Highway 44 northwest into Marianna, Crowley's Ridge Parkway continues along Highway 44 (Martin Luther King Jr. Drive) until Poplar Street, where it turns north onto Chestnut Street. Near this intersection the byway passes the Marianna Commercial Historic District, the Lee County Courthouse, and a monument for Confederate General Robert E. Lee. Chestnut Street becomes Highway 1 Business before turning north onto US 79/AR 1. Crowley's Ridge Parkway follows Highway 1 north into Haynes and St. Francis County. Just south of Forrest City, the parkway turns onto Highway 1B to downtown Forrest City. The route turns onto Front Street at the St. Francis County Museum, then onto Izard Street as it passes the First United Methodist Church and has a junction with US 70. Crowley's Ridge Parkway follows US 70 for two blocks before turning left onto Forrest Street. Now facing north, the parkway passes the historic Campbell House and the Stuart Springs before joining with Highway 284 and crossing over Interstate 40/US 63 (I-40/US 63). Continuing north, Crowley's Ridge Parkway passes East Arkansas Community College before forming the western boundary of Village Creek State Park and entering Cross County.

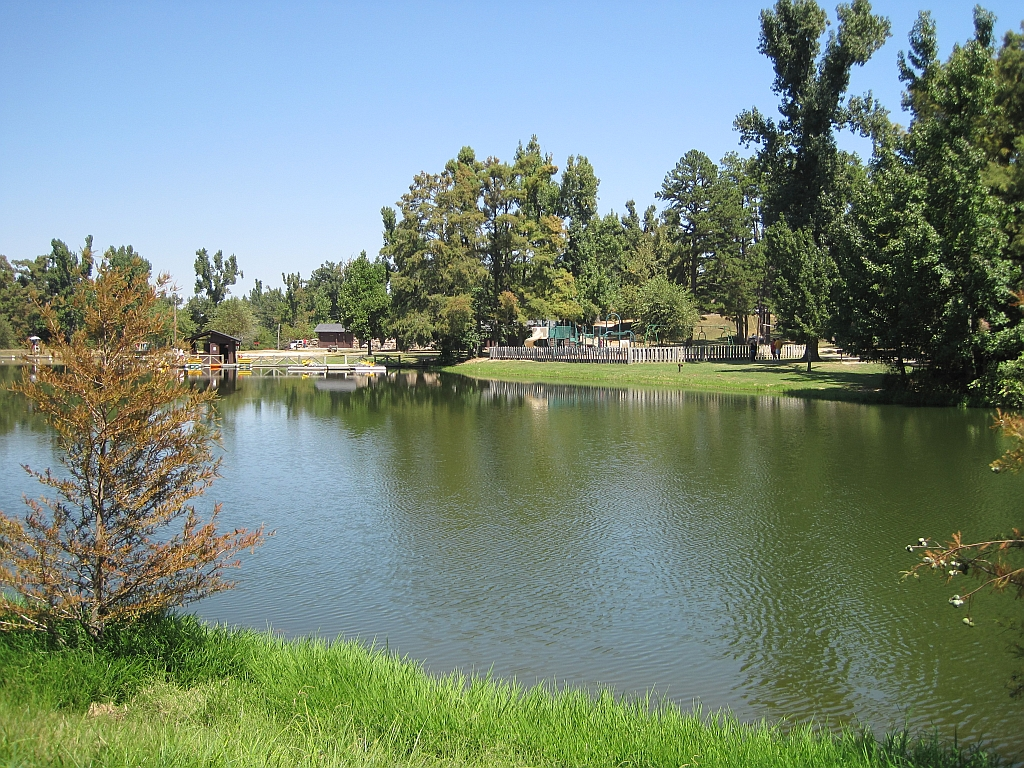
Crowley's Ridge State Park

The parkway travels among many different unique species of animals and plants, and meets historical sites such as the Parkin Archeological State Park, Chalk Bluff Battlefield and the Battle of Helena Battlefields. The Parkway also runs through Lake Poinsett State Park, which offers numerous campgrounds to travelers. The parkway runs through numerous parks, including Chalk Bluff Battlefield Park, Crowley's Ridge State Park, Delta Cultural Center, Hemingway-Pfeiffer Museum and Educational Center, Lake Frierson State Park, Lake Poinsett State Park, Louisiana Purchase State Park, Parker Pioneer Homestead, Parkin Archeological State Park, Southland Greyhound Park, and the Village Creek State Park. In Missouri the route runs past Morris State Park.

Cities along the Arkansas portion of the route include Piggott, Paragould, Jonesboro, Wynne, Forrest City, Marianna, West Helena and Helena.

=== Missouri ===
Crowley's Ridge Parkway continues through unique countryside and American Civil War era battlefields in the Missouri Bootheel. It terminates at Business Route 25 in Malden after 14.2 miles (22.9 km) in the state.

== History ==

The route was designated a state scenic byway in Arkansas in 1997 and a National Scenic Byway in 1998. The Missouri scenic byway designation was granted in 2000.

== Major intersections ==
County	Location	mi	km	Destinations	Notes
Mississippi River		0.00	0.00	Southern end of the National Scenic Byway at the Helena Bridge; US 49 continues southward	
Phillips	Helena-West Helena	0.56	0.90	US 49 north (Martin Luther King Jr Drive) / US 49B (Biscoe Street)	US 49 departs the byway northward, begin concurrency with US 49B
Phillips	Helena-West Helena	2.19	3.52	US 49B north (Columbia Street)	US 49B departs the byway northward
Phillips	Helena-West Helena	3.25	5.23	US 49B north (Porter Street/Perry Street)	begin concurrency with US 49B, separate one-ways
Phillips	Helena-West Helena	3.80	6.12	AR 185 south (Perry Street)	
Phillips	Helena-West Helena	6.64	10.69	US 49B north (Plaza Avenue) / AR 242	US 49B departs the byway northward, begin concurrency with AR 242
Phillips	St. Francis National Forest	8.39	13.50	AR 185 south	
Phillips	St. Francis National Forest	8.83	14.21	AR 242 west (Storm Creek Road) / AR 242S	AR 242 departs the byway eastward, begin concurrency with AR 242S
Phillips	St. Francis National Forest	8.94	14.39	AR 242S east (Storm Creek Road) / CR 217	AR 242S ends, route continues along Phillips CR 217
Lee	St. Francis National Forest	25.2	40.6	AR 44	Begin concurrency at eastern terminus of AR 44
Lee	Marianna	32.1	51.7	AR 44 west (Martin Luther King Drive)	AR 44 departs the byway westward
Lee	Marianna	33.1	53.3	AR 1B south (Alabama Street)	Begin concurrency with AR 1B
Lee	Marianna	33.4	53.8	US 79 south / AR 1 south (Forrest Avenue)	AR 1B ends, Begin concurrency with US 79/AR 1
Lee	Marianna	33.6	54.1	US 79 north	US 79 departs the byway northward
Lee	Felton	36.3	58.4	AR 121 north	
Lee	Haynes	42.0	67.6	AR 131 north	
St. Francis		46.3	74.5	AR 1 north / AR 1B	AR 1 departs the byway northward, begin concurrency with AR 1B
St. Francis		46.6	75.0	AR 980 east – Forest City Municipal Airport	
St. Francis	Forrest City	49.8	80.1	AR 334 east (Linden Road)	
St. Francis	Forrest City	50.6	81.4	AR 1B north (Washington Street)	AR 1B departs the byway northward
St. Francis	Forrest City	50.7	81.6	US 70 west (Broadway Avenue)	Begin concurrency with US 70
St. Francis	Forrest City	50.8	81.8	US 70 east (Broadway Avenue)	US 70 departs the byway eastward
St. Francis	Forrest City	51.5	82.9	AR 284 west (Arkansas Avenue)	Begin concurrency with AR 284
St. Francis	Forrest City	53.0	85.3	I-40 / US 63 – West Memphis, Little Rock	
St. Francis	Colt	61.9	99.6	AR 306 west	
Cross		68.2	109.8	AR 284 west / CR 734	AR 284 departs the byway westward, route continues along Cross CR 734
Cross	Wynne	70.7	113.8	AR 1 south (Falls Boulevard)	Begin concurrency with AR 1
Cross	Wynne	71.2	114.6	AR 284 west (Union Avenue)	
Cross	Wynne	71.3	114.7	AR 1B north (Falls Boulevard)	AR 1B departs the byway northward
Cross	Wynne	72.1	116.0	US 64B / AR 1B (Falls Boulevard)	Begin concurrency at western terminus of US 64B
Cross		74.0	119.1	AR 284 east	
Cross		76.5	123.1	US 64 west	US 64B ends, begin concurrency with US 64
Cross	Levesque	77.1	124.1	AR 163 south	Begin concurrency with AR 163, continue concurrency with US 64
Cross	Levesque	77.2	124.2	US 64 east	US 64 departs the byway eastward, continue concurrency with AR 163
Cross		84.1	135.3	AR 364 west	
Cross	Birdeye	86.2	138.7	AR 42	
Poinsett		92.7	149.2	AR 373 north	
Poinsett		100.4	161.6	AR 14 east	Begin concurrency with AR 14, continue concurrency with AR 163
Poinsett		100.9	162.4	AR 163 north	AR 163 departs the byway northward
Poinsett	Harrisburg	101.4	163.2	AR 14 west (Jackson Street)	AR 14 departs the byway westward
Poinsett		102.1	164.3	AR 14 / AR 163 south	Begin concurrency with AR 163
Poinsett		107.0	172.2	AR 214 east	
Poinsett		110.1	177.2	AR 158 west	
Poinsett		112.2	180.6	AR 69 north	
Craighead		117.1	188.5	AR 158 east	
Craighead	Jonesboro	119.0	191.5	AR 163S north (Apt Drive)	
Craighead	Jonesboro	119.2	191.8	AR 1 (Stadium Boulevard) / AR 1B (Harrisburg Road)	AR 163 ends, begin concurrency at AR 1B southern terminus
Craighead	Jonesboro	122.1	196.5	I-555 / US 49 / US 63 (Joe N. Martin Expressway)	Interchange
Craighead	Jonesboro	123.2	198.3	AR 18 west (Highland Drive)	Begin concurrency with AR 18
Craighead	Jonesboro	123.4	198.6	AR 18 east (Southwest Drive)	AR 18 departs the parkway westward
Craighead	Jonesboro	127.8	205.7	US 49 / AR 1 south (Stadium Boulevard)	Begin concurrency with US 49/AR 1
Craighead	Jonesboro	128.8	207.3	AR 91 south (Johnson Avenue)	
Craighead	Jonesboro	129.4	208.2	US 49 / AR 1 north / AR 351 south (Johnson Avenue)	US 49/AR 1 departs the parkway northward, begin concurrency with AR 351
Craighead		133.6	215.0	AR 351 north / CR 766 (New Haven Church Road)	AR 351 departs the parkway northward, route continues along Craighead CR 766
Craighead		137.1	220.6	AR 141 south	CR 766 ends, begin concurrency with AR 141
Greene	Lorado	140.0	225.3	AR 168 west	Begin concurrency with AR 168, continue concurrency with AR 141
Greene		140.6	226.3	AR 358 east (Finch Road)	
Greene	Walcott	144.5	232.6	AR 141 north	AR 141 departs the byway northward, continue concurrency with AR 168
Greene		147.0	236.6	US 412 west	AR 168 ends, begin concurrency with US 412
Greene	Paragould	150.9	242.9	US 412 east	End concurrency with US 412; begin concurrency with US 412B
Greene	Paragould	155.6	250.4	US 49 / AR 1 (Linwood Drive)	
Greene	Paragould	156.2	251.4	US 412B east (King's Highway)	US 412B departs the parkway eastward
Greene	Paragould	156.7	252.2	US 49B (2nd Street)	
Greene	Paragould	157.0	252.7	US 49B (2nd Street)	
Greene	Paragould	157.9	254.1	US 49 / AR 1 south (Linwood Drive)	Begin concurrency with US 49/AR 1
Greene	Paragould	159.1	256.0	US 49 / AR 1 north (Linwood Drive) / AR 135 south	US 49/AR 1 departs the parkway northbound, begin concurrency with AR 135
Greene	Oak Grove Heights	164.3	264.4	AR 34 west	
Greene	Lafe	168.5	271.2	AR 34 east	
Greene	Hooker	170.6	274.6	AR 135 north / AR 141 south	AR 135 departs the parkway northbound, begin concurrency with AR 141
Clay		181.9	292.7	AR 90 west	Begin concurrency with AR 90, continue concurrency with AR 141
Clay	Boydsville	185.2	298.1	AR 90 east	AR 90 departs the parkway eastward, continue concurrency with AR 141
Clay	McDougal	192.4	309.6	US 62 west	AR 141 ends, begin concurrency with US 62
Clay	Pollard	199.5	321.1	AR 139 north	
Clay	Piggott	199.5	321.1	US 62 east (12th Avenue)	US 62 departs the byway eastward
Clay	Piggott	200.5	322.7	US 62 west (3rd Avenue)	Begin concurrency with US 62
Clay	Piggott	200.9	323.3	US 49 / AR 1 south (Thornton Avenue)	Begin concurrency with AR 1, continue concurrency with US 62
Clay	Trinnon	202.6	326.1	AR 139 south	
Clay	Trinnon	202.9	326.5	AR 1 north	AR 1 departs the byway northward
St. Francis River		197.8	318.3	Arkansas–Missouri state line	
Dunklin	Campbell	202.7	326.2	US 62 east / Route 53 south (Allen Road) / Route WW	US 62 departs the byway eastward, begin concurrency with SSR-WW
Dunklin		207.5	333.9	Route J east	SSR-WW ends, begin concurrency with SSR-J
Dunklin	Malden	212.0	341.2	Route 25 Bus. (Douglas Street)	Northern terminus
1.000 mi = 1.609 km; 1.000 km = 0.621 mi: Concurrency terminus
