= U.S. Route 49 =

Highway in the United States

U.S. Route 49
- US 49 highlighted in red

Route information
- Length: 516 mi (830 km)
- Existed: 1926–present

Southern section
- South end: US 90 at Gulfport, MS
- Major intersections: I-10 at Gulfport, MS; I-59 at Hattiesburg, MS; I-20 / I-55 at Jackson, MS
- North end: US 49E / US 49W at Yazoo City, MS

Northern section
- South end: US 49E / US 49W at Tutwiler, MS
- Major intersections: US 61 at Clarksdale, MS; I-40 / US 63 at Brinkley, AR; I-555 / US 63 at Jonesboro, AR
- North end: US 62 / AR 1 / AR 139 at Piggott, AR

Location
- Country: United States
- States: Mississippi, Arkansas
- Counties: MS: Harrison, Stone, Forrest, Covington, Simpson, Rankin, Hinds, Madison, Yazoo; Tallahatchie, Coahoma; AR: Phillips, Monroe, Woodruff, Cross, Poinsett, Craighead, Greene, Clay

Highway system
- United States Numbered Highway System; List; Special; Divided
- Mississippi State Highway System; Interstate; US; State
- Arkansas Highway System; Interstate; US; State; Business; Spurs; Suffixed; Scenic; Heritage
← US 48	US	→ US 50
← MS 48	MS	→ US 49E
← I-49	AR	→ AR 50

U.S. Route 49 (US 49) is a north–south United States highway. The highway's northern terminus is in Piggott, Arkansas, at an intersection with U.S. Route 62 (US 62). Its southern terminus is in Gulfport, Mississippi, at an intersection with US 90. US 49 is approximately 516 miles (830 km) in length.

It was at the junction of US 49 and U.S. Route 61 that blues singer Robert Johnson is said to have sold his soul to the Devil. The highway is also the subject of songs by Big Joe Williams and Howlin' Wolf (Chester Arthur Burnett).

== Route description ==
Lengths
	mi	km
MS	334	538
AR	182	113
Total	516	321

=== Mississippi ===
US 49 has historically been one of the most important highways in Mississippi. It was the state's first highway to see a significant rural segment four-laned. Today, it is the only four-laned route directly connecting Jackson, the state's capital and largest city, to the Mississippi Gulf Coast. Some urban segments along this portion of the route maintain three or more traffic lanes in each direction. US 49 serves as a primary hurricane evacuation route for Gulf Coast residents.

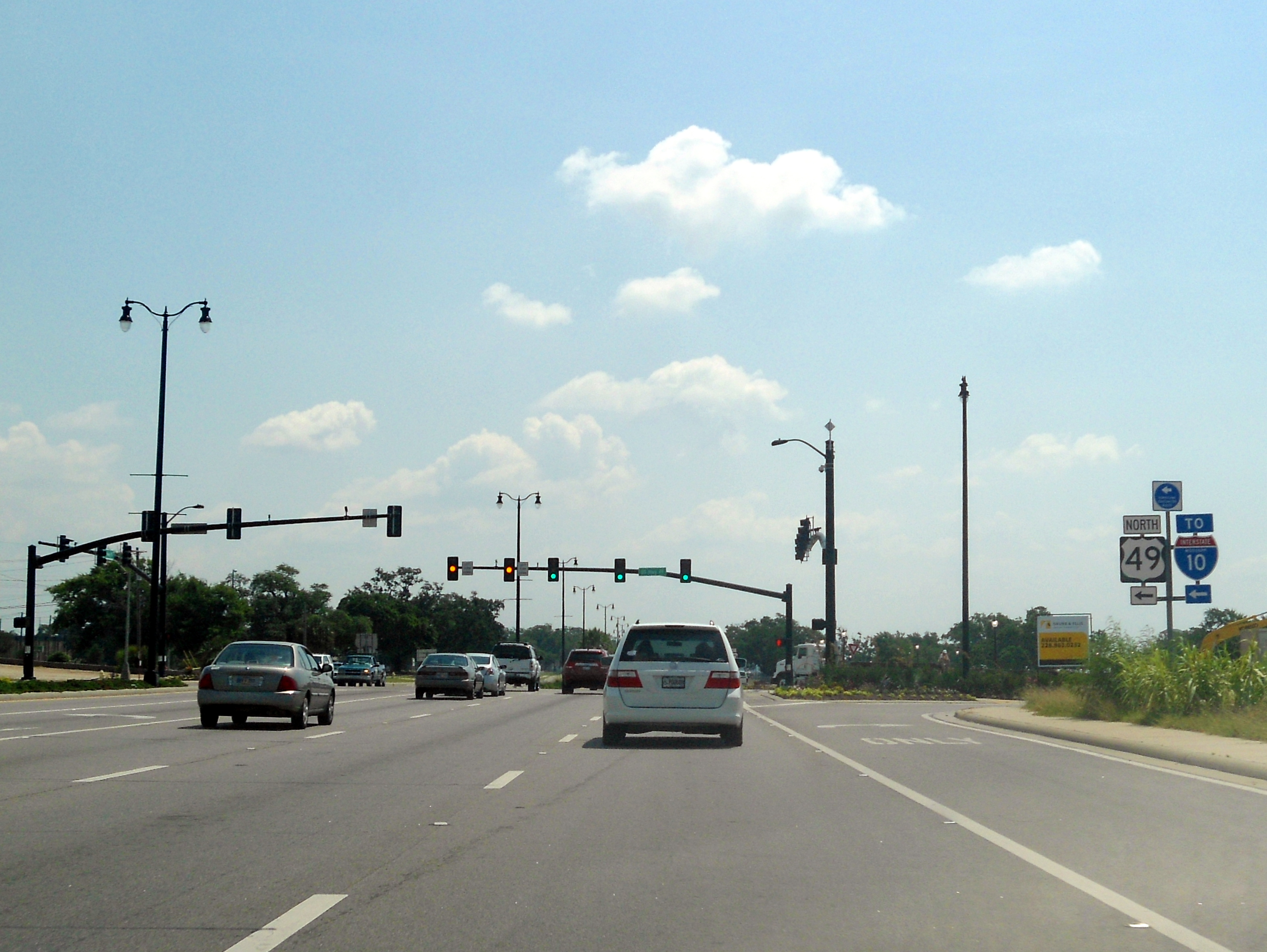
Southern terminus of US 49 at US 90 in Gulfport

US 49 begins near the Port of Gulfport, Mississippi at a junction with US 90. It provides a major connection between the port, casinos, beaches and downtown with I-10 (exits 34A-B), where it has its first major junction being a full service cloverleaf interchange on the city's north end. The crossing of these two roads is officially recognized by the state of Mississippi as the Castilgia Interchange. North of I-10, US 49 passes through suburban areas and enters De Soto National Forest. Various state highway interchanges and junctions are encountered before the route passes near Camp Shelby, then through an interchange with US 98 just south of Hattiesburg. At this point, travelers have an option of continuing on US 49 through Hattiesburg or using the I-59/US 98 bypass which reconnects with US 49 in the northern part of the city. Continuing on US 49 brings one to a cloverleaf interchange at US 11, one of very few in the South to lack merging lanes between loop ramps, thus exacerbating the weaving patterns which plague many cloverleaf interchanges.

US 49 passes Hattiesburg's primary medical facility, Forrest General Hospital, and the campus of the University of Southern Mississippi before arriving at another, more standard cloverleaf interchange with I-59. Those who used the aforementioned bypass, wishing to reconnect with US 49 North to the state capital, must use exit 67B. It is also at I-59, where Mississippi Highway 42 (MS 42) runs with US 49 for a short distance as suburban development is soon encountered as the road returns to rural environs. Eventually, MS 42 departs from the four-laned highway and branches off to the west toward smaller towns, starting with Sumrall. Interchanges between Hattiesburg and Jackson provide access to various state highways, and one at Collins provides access to US 84.

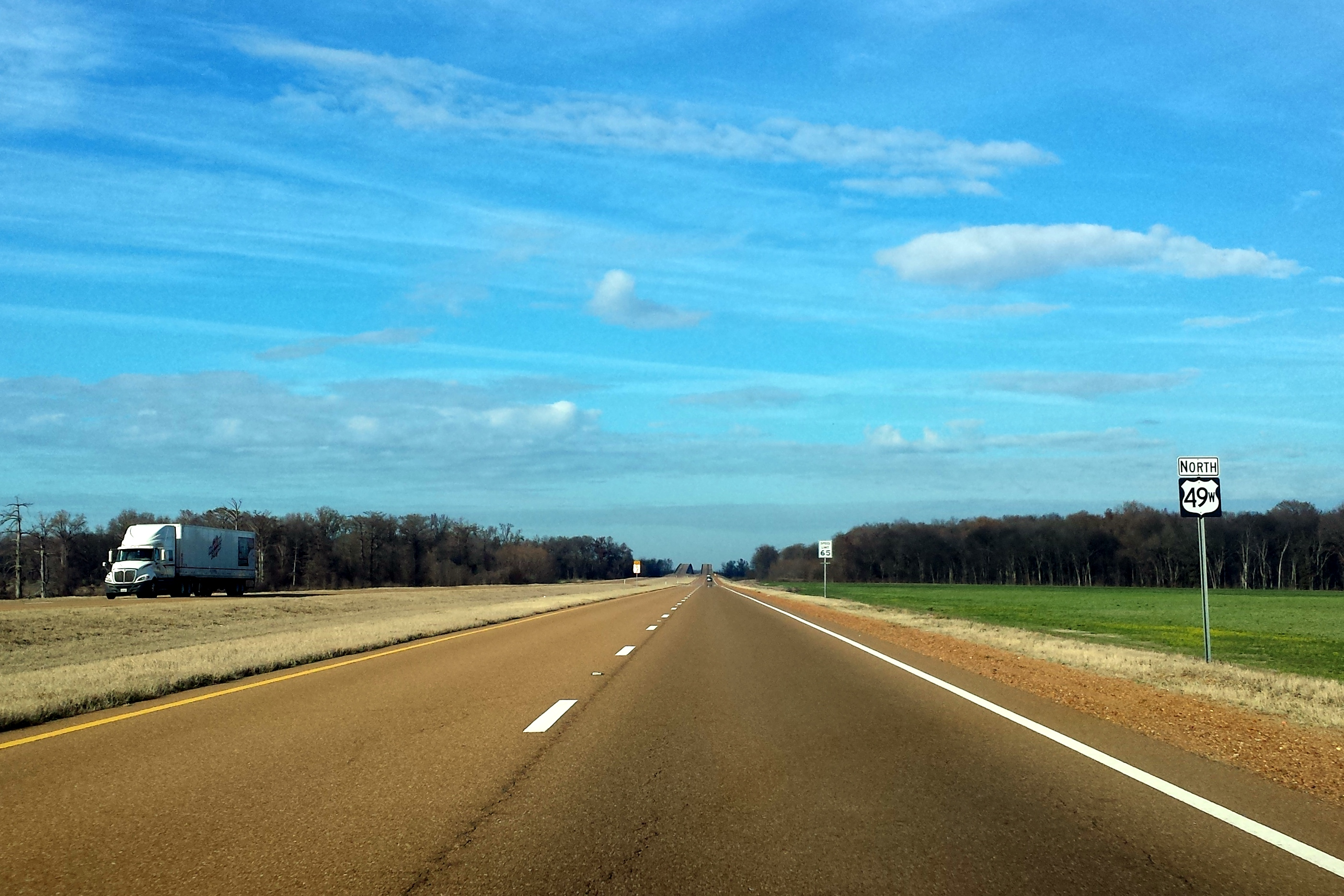
US 49W passing through the Mississippi Delta north of Yazoo City

Just north of the city of Richland, US 49 upgrades to Interstate Highway standards before joining I-20 (at exit 47) using a two-lane flyover. About a mile later, in Jackson proper, I-20/US 49 merges with I-55 at a stack interchange. I-20/I-55/US 49 crosses the Pearl River into Hinds County and bypasses Downtown Jackson, where I-55 departs to the south. US 49/I-20 continue west until US 49 ends its run with I-20 and joins I-220 before turning northwest to Yazoo City. A split in the highway, rare in the U.S. Highway System, begins here; both routes head into the Mississippi Delta, US 49W serving the towns of Belzoni and Indianola, where it junctions with US 82 and its four-lane segment ends, while two-laned US 49E serves Tchula before encountering US 82 at Greenwood. Both routes continue north from US 82 and are linked again at Tutwiler. Continuing northwest, the highway passes through an interchange with US 61 as it enters Clarksdale. It is at Clarksdale that US 49 encounters "The Crossroads", the legendary junction with State Street (an old alignment of US 61) where the great blues musician Robert Johnson is reputed to have sold his soul to the devil.

From Clarksdale, US 49 continues north and crosses the Mississippi River using the Helena Bridge where it enters Arkansas near the town of Helena.

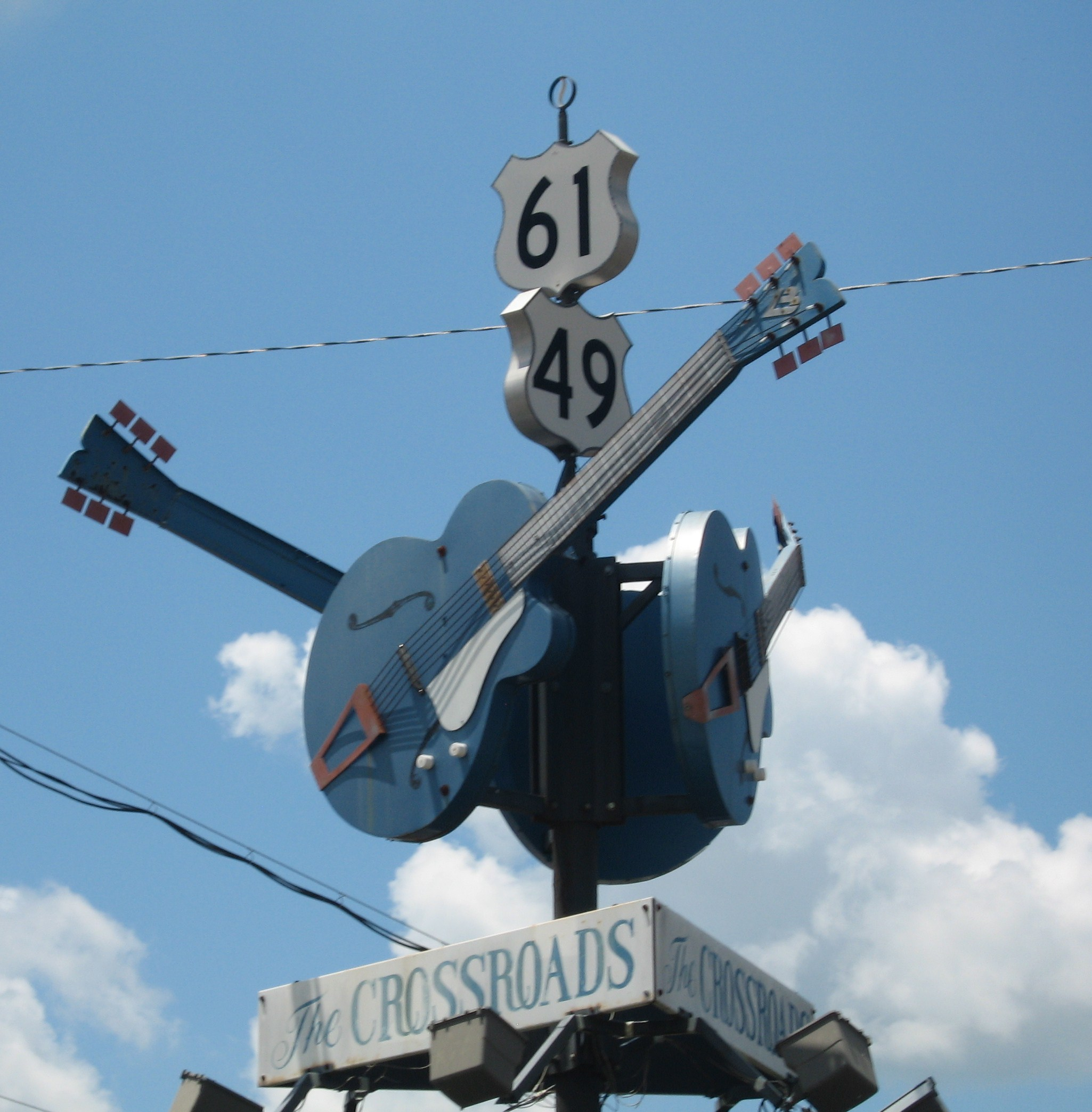
The legendary "Crossroads" at Clarksdale, the inspiration for the song "Cross Road Blues"

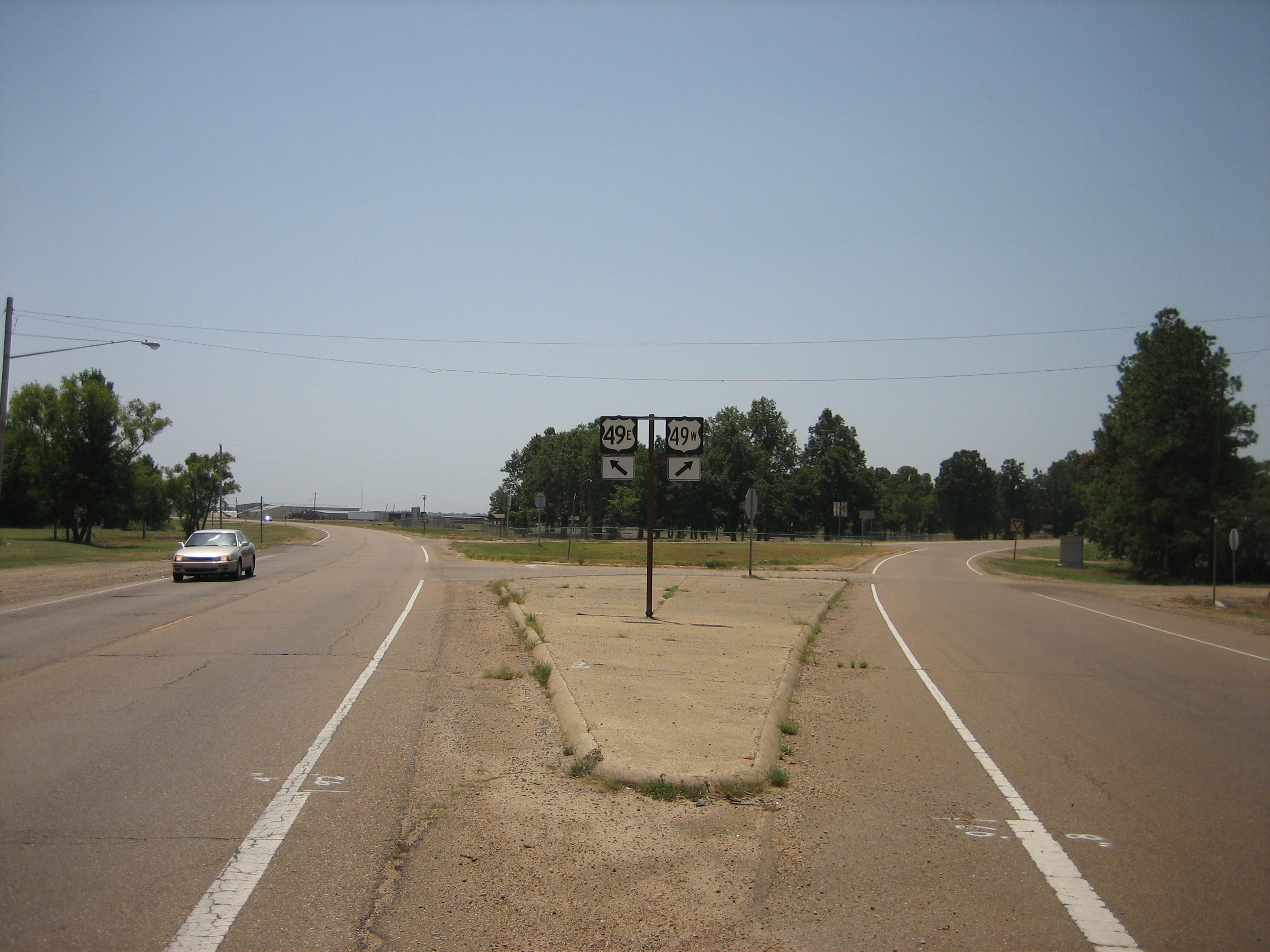
Split of US 49 in Tutwiler

In May 2005 portions of extant US 49E were renamed the "Emmett Till Memorial Highway".

The Mississippi section of US 49 and the routes of US 49E and US 49W are defined at Mississippi Code Annotated § 65-3-3.

=== Arkansas ===
US 49 enters Arkansas near Helena-West Helena in Phillips County. US 49 Business runs around the north part of the city, with the main route meeting AR 242 in the southern portion. US 49 continues west to Walnut Corner where the route meets AR 1 (and briefly AR 316). The US 49/AR 1 concurrency ends in Marvell and US 49 enters Monroe County.

Upon entering Monroe County, US 49 turns north to begin a concurrency with AR 39. US 49 also crosses US 79 before meeting US 70 near Brinkley. The route crosses Interstate 40 north of Brinkley prior to entering Woodruff County. US 49 runs northeast through rural Woodruff County, not crossing of concurring with any important routes before crossing into Cross County.

The route meets US 64 in Fair Oaks and meets AR 42 in southern Hickory Ridge. It then enters Poinsett County, concurring with AR 214 from Fisher until Waldenburg. The route crosses AR 14 in Waldenburg.

US 49 runs along south Jonesboro, with US 49 Business formerly running into town. US 49 concurs with US 63 until again joining AR 1. The two routes angle north through downtown Jonesboro, crossing US 63 Business and passing by ASU Stadium before leaving town. US 49/AR 1 pass around Brookland, with US 49 Business serving the community.

Entering Greene County, US 49/AR 1 intersects US 412 and briefly meets AR 358 before entering Paragould. The routes cross US 412B near Kirk Field in Paragould, also meeting AR 135 north of town. US 49B also rejoins US 49/AR 1 north of Paragould.

Continuing northeast through rural Greene County, US 49/AR 1 meet AR 34 in Marmaduke and AR 90 in Rector. The route turns north to Piggott at Hargrave Corner, terminating at US 62/AR 139. The Arkansas portion of US 49 is mainly two-lane undivided.

== History ==
One of the original US highways, US 49 was extended north from Clarksdale, Mississippi to US 70 in Brinkley, Arkansas via U.S. Route 61 and Highway 6 in 1963. US 49 was again extended north in 1978, replacing Highway 39 between Brinkley and Jonesboro. Highway 1 between Jonesboro and Piggott was redesignated as US 49 in 1979.

It is notable that for several years during the 1930s, a second split route existed on US 49 in South Mississippi, similar to but shorter than the split that still exists in the Delta region. Between Brooklyn and Hattiesburg, travelers had the option of a 24-mile-long (39 km) direct route via US 49W, or a somewhat shorter but broken route on US 49E, serving the Forrest County Agricultural High School and the small community of McLaurin, Mississippi.

== Gallery ==
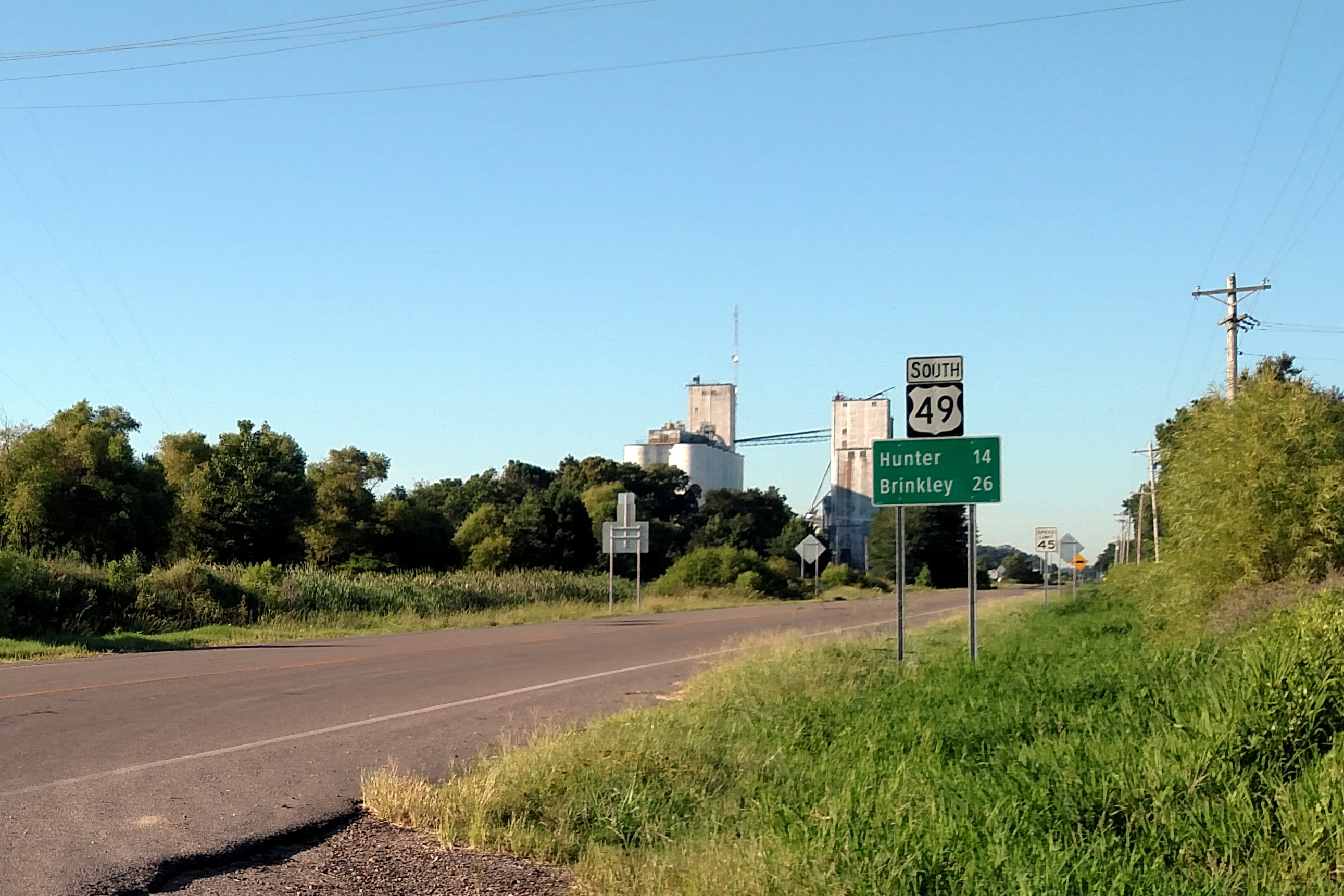
US 49 in Fair Oaks, AR

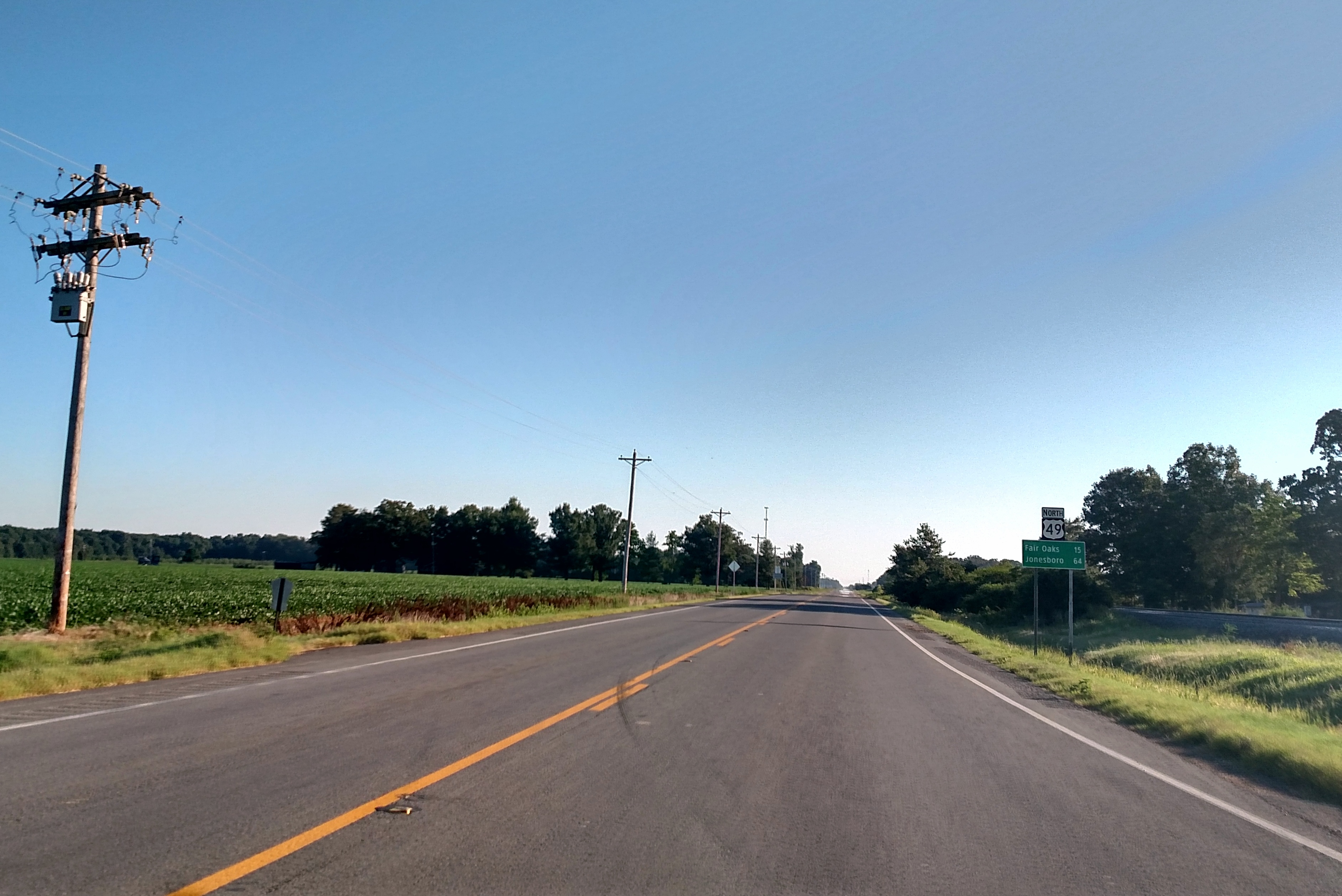
US 49 north of Brinkley, AR

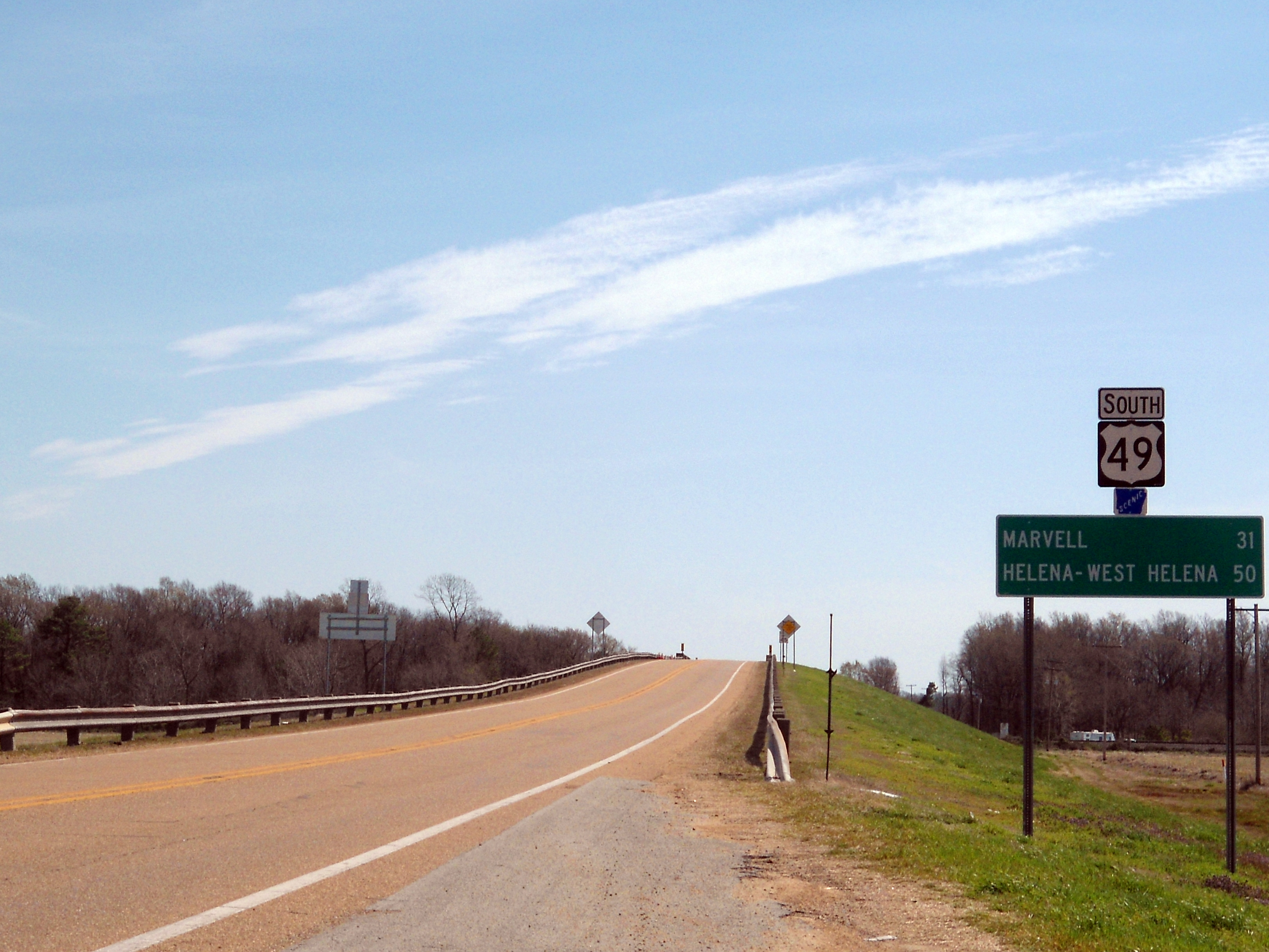
US 49 south of the US 70 junction in south Brinkley

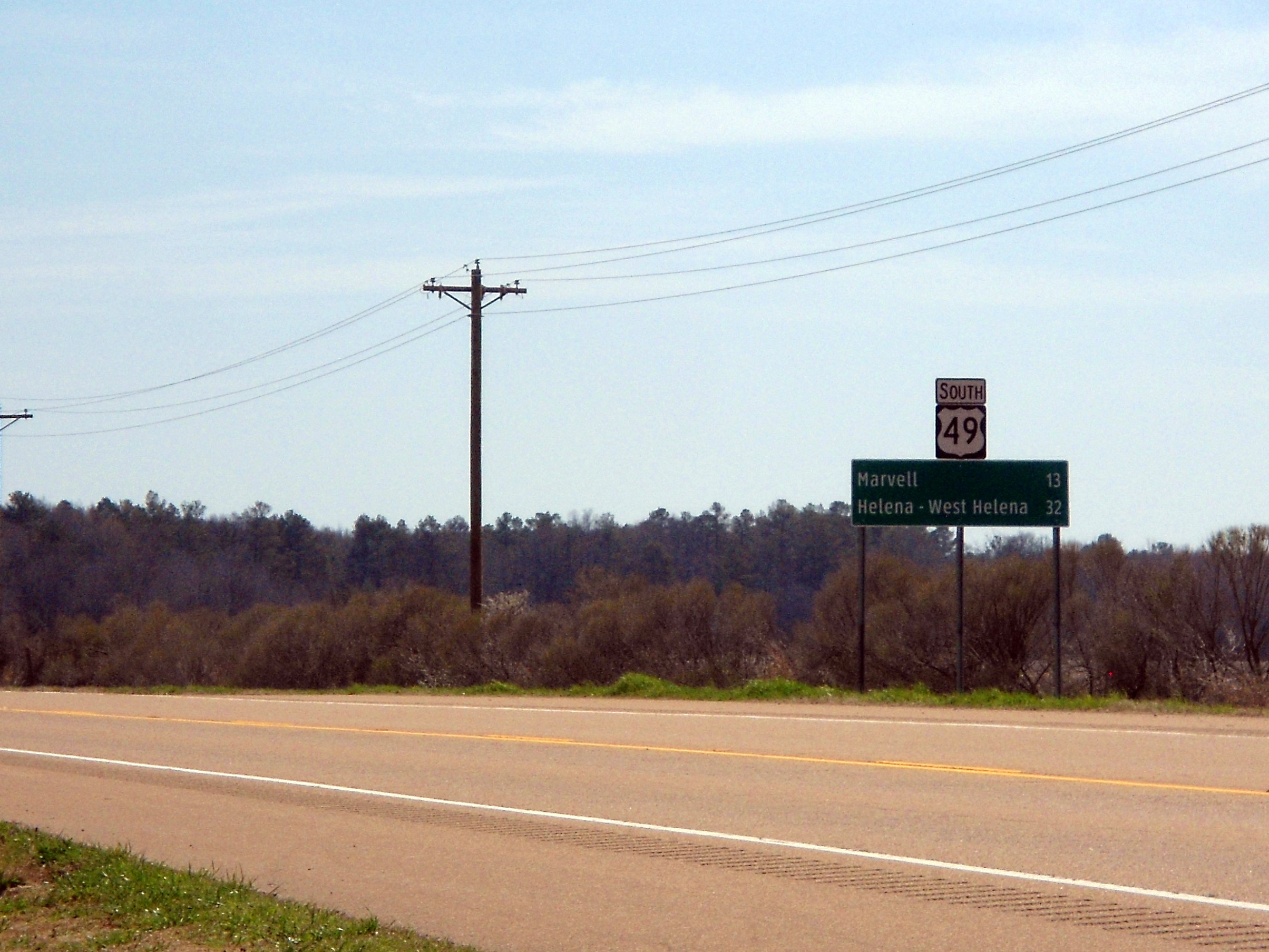
US 49 south of Highway 362 junction near Louisiana Purchase State Park

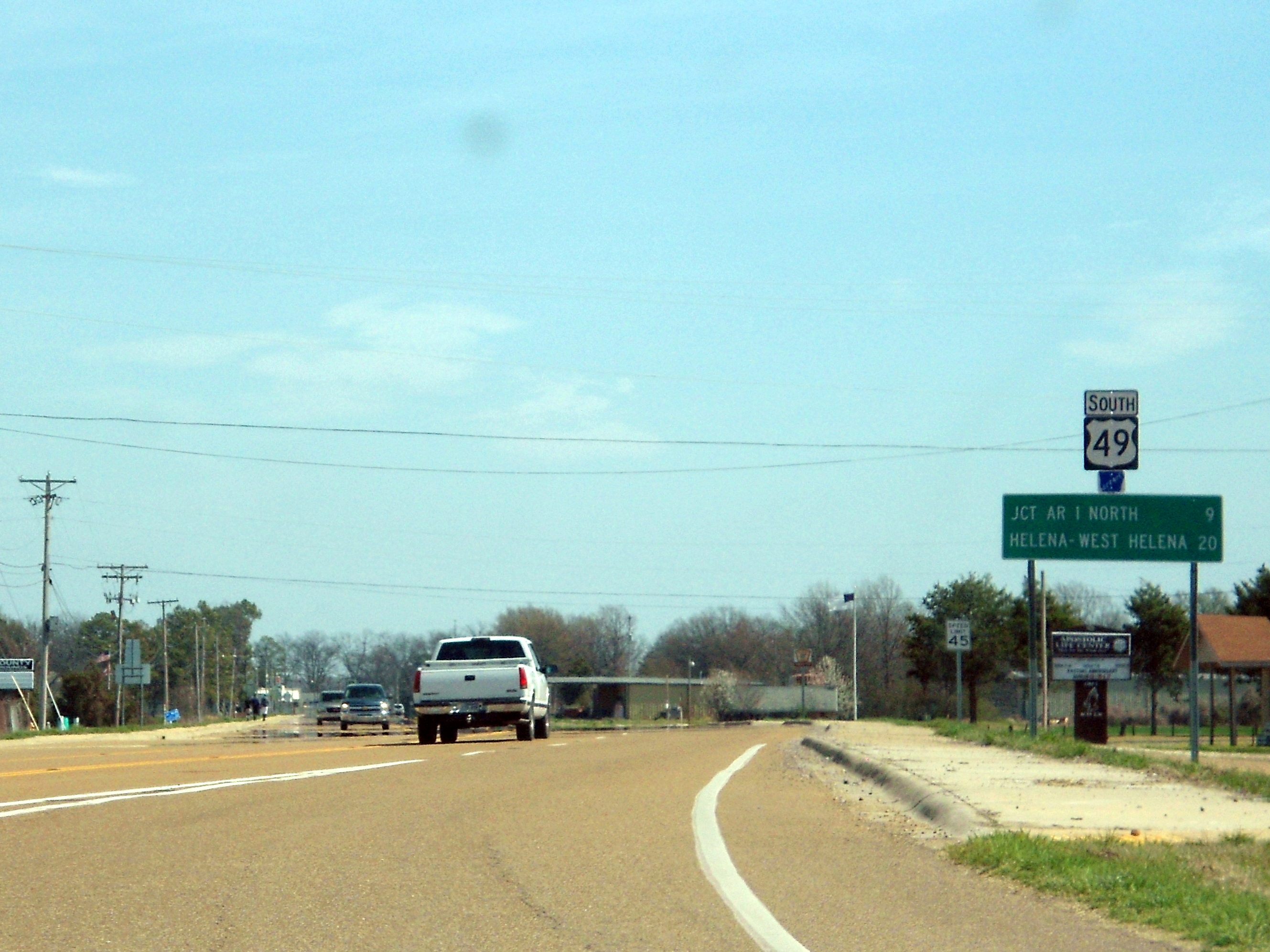
US 49 and Highway 1 concur in Marvell, AR

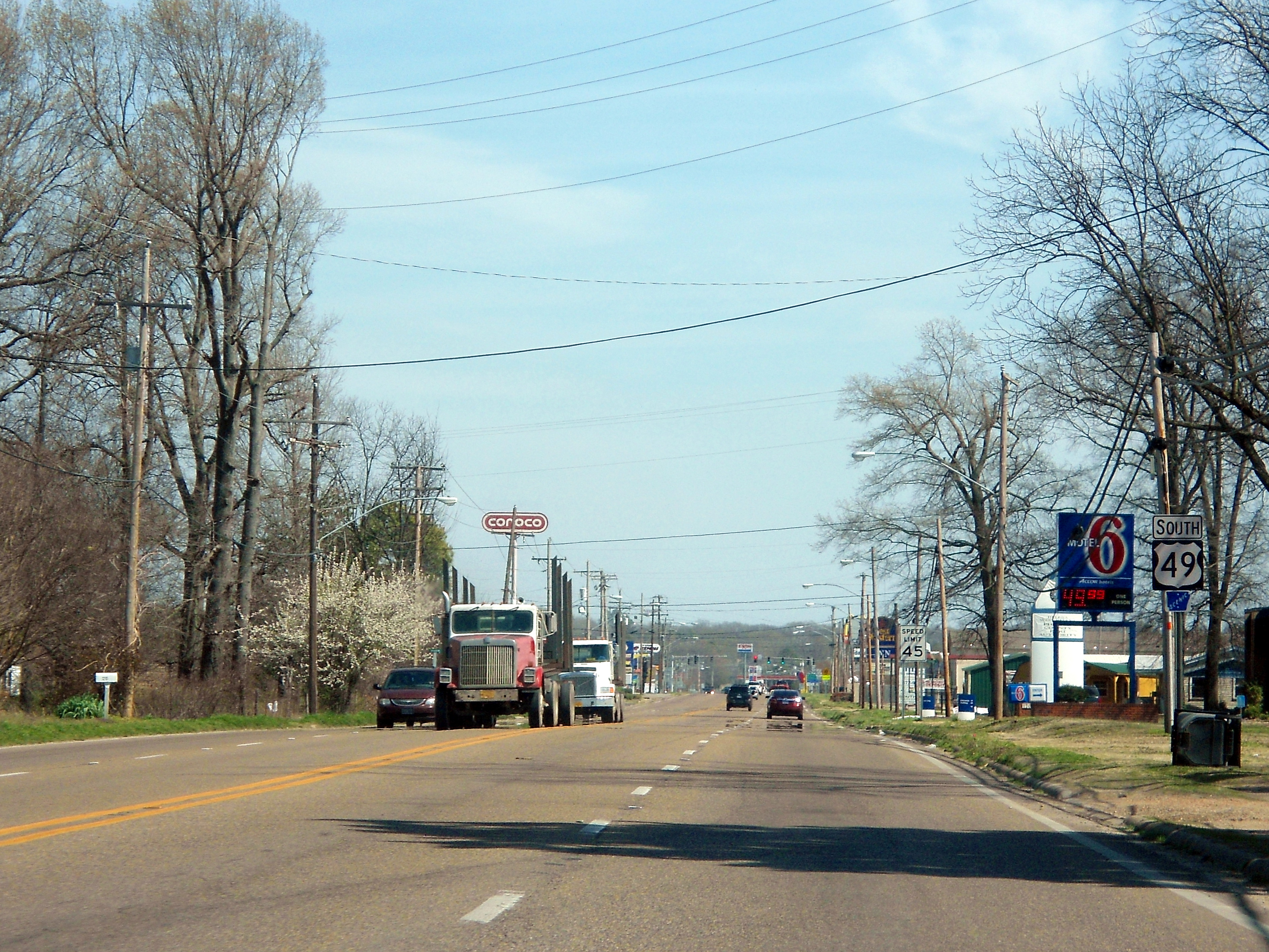
US 49 in Helena-West Helena, AR

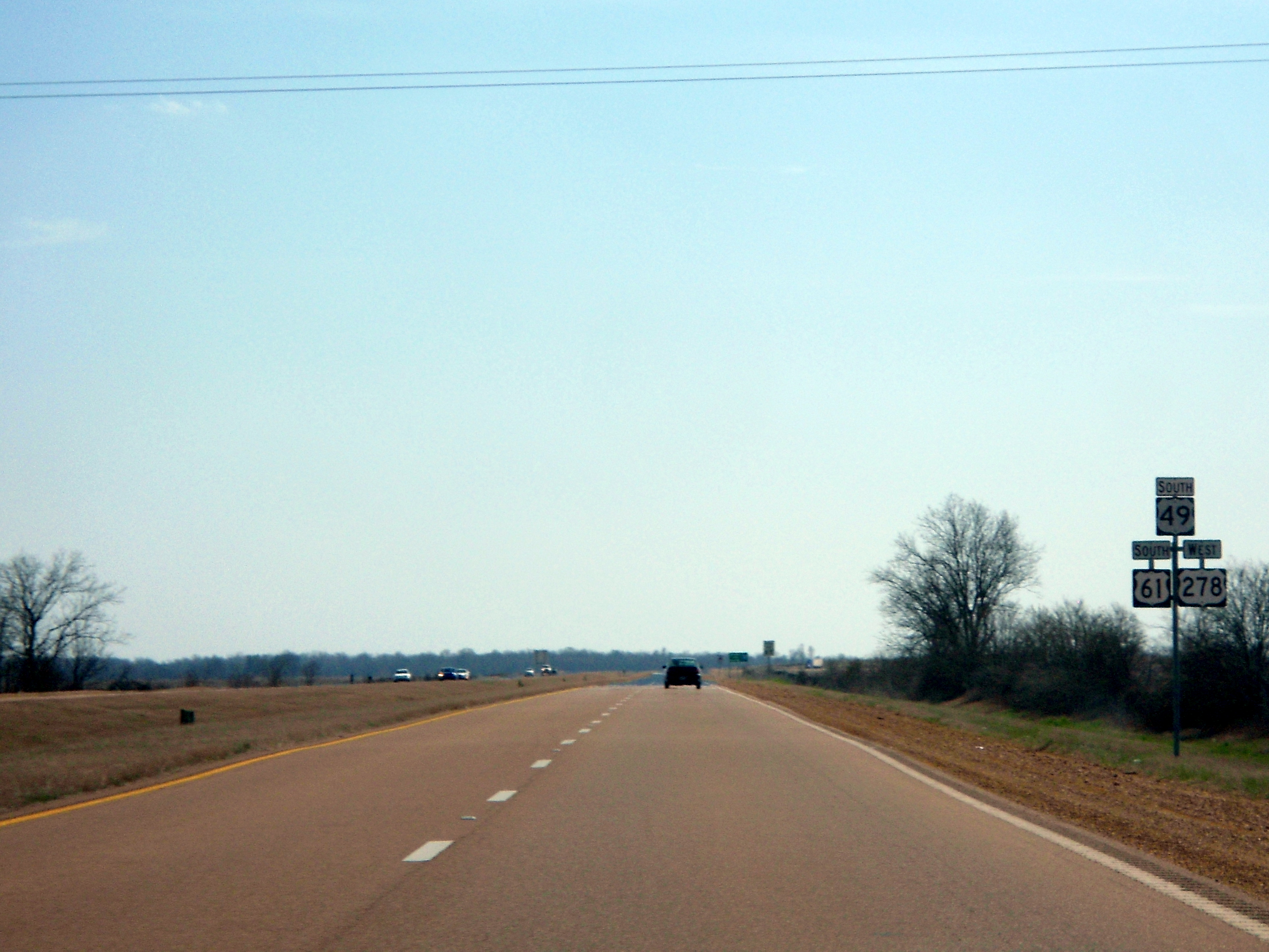
US 49 with U.S. Routes 61 and 278

== Major intersections ==
State	County	Location	mi	km	Exit	Destinations	Notes
Mississippi	Harrison	Gulfport	0.00	0.00		US 90 – Biloxi, Long Beach, Ship Island Ferry	Southern terminus
Mississippi	Harrison	Gulfport	4.4– 4.9	7.1– 7.9		I-10 – New Orleans, Biloxi, Mobile	Exits 34A-B on I-10
Mississippi	Harrison	Gulfport	9.4	15.1		MS 53 north – Poplarville, Lyman Fish Hatchery	
Mississippi	Harrison		20.0– 20.6	32.2– 33.2		MS 67 south – D'Iberville, Biloxi	Interchange
Mississippi	Stone	Wiggins, Stone County	32.9	52.9		MS 149 north to MS 29 – Downtown Wiggins, South Wiggins, Flint Creek Water Park	
Mississippi	Stone	Wiggins, Stone County	34.2– 34.6	55.0– 55.7		MS 26 – Poplarville, Lucedale	Interchange
Mississippi	Stone	Wiggins, Stone County	36.7	59.1		MS 149 south to MS 29 – Downtown Wiggins, Flint Creek Water Park	
Mississippi	Forrest		41.6	66.9		MS 13 north – Lumberton	
Mississippi	Forrest		54.6	87.9		S Lake Drive – Paul B. Johnson State Park	Access road into park
Mississippi	Forrest	Hattiesburg	62.3– 62.8	100.3– 101.1		US 98 to I-59 – Columbia, Laurel, Lucedale, Mobile	Interchange
Mississippi	Forrest	Hattiesburg	65.1	104.8		Edwards Street (MS 969 north)	
Mississippi	Forrest	Hattiesburg	67.5– 67.9	108.6– 109.3		US 11 (Broadway Drive) – Purvis	Interchange
Mississippi	Forrest	Hattiesburg	69.1	111.2		MS 198 west (Hardy Street) to I-59 / US 98 – Columbia	
Mississippi	Forrest	Hattiesburg	70.7	113.8		Old Highway 42 - Petal	Former MS 42 east
Mississippi	Forrest	Hattiesburg	71.6– 72.0	115.2– 115.9		I-59 / MS 42 east – New Orleans, Gulf Coast, Laurel, Airport	Southern end of MS 42 concurrency; exit 67 on I-59
Mississippi	Forrest		77.5	124.7		MS 42 west – Sumrall, Prentiss	Northern end of MS 42 concurrency
Mississippi	Covington		84.2	135.5		MS 598 east – Sanford	
Mississippi	Covington	Seminary	88.9	143.1		MS 589 south – Sumrall	
Mississippi	Covington	Seminary	89.1	143.4		MS 590 east – Seminary	
Mississippi	Covington	Collins	95.1– 95.5	153.0– 153.7		MS 184 – Downtown Collins	Interchange
Mississippi	Covington	Collins	96.4– 96.7	155.1– 155.6		US 84 – Prentiss, Laurel	Interchange
Mississippi	Covington		104.2	167.7		MS 149 north	
Mississippi	Covington	Mount Olive	104.7	168.5		MS 35 – Bassfield, Columbia, Mount Olive, Mize	
Mississippi	Covington	Mount Olive	106.6	171.6		MS 149 south – Mount Olive	
Mississippi	Simpson	Magee	113.4	182.5		MS 149 north	
Mississippi	Simpson	Magee	114.1	183.6		MS 28 east – Mize, Laurel	Southern end of MS 28 concurrency
Mississippi	Simpson	Magee	114.2	183.8		MS 541 north – Downtown Magee	Southern end of MS 541 concurrency
Mississippi	Simpson	Magee	114.6	184.4		MS 28 west / MS 541 south – Georgetown, Hazlehurst	Northern end of MS 28/MS 541 concurrency
Mississippi	Simpson	Magee	117.0	188.3		MS 149 to MS 545 – Boswell Regional Center (Department of Mental Health)	Interchange
Mississippi	Simpson		119.3	192.0		MS 149 south – Sanatorium	
Mississippi	Simpson	Mendenhall	123.8	199.2		MS 149 north	
Mississippi	Simpson	Mendenhall	124.1	199.7		MS 540	
Mississippi	Simpson	Mendenhall	126.1– 126.4	202.9– 203.4		MS 13 – Mendenhall, Prentiss, Puckett	Interchange
Mississippi	Simpson		134.2	216.0		MS 149 south	
Mississippi	Rankin	Florence	145.5	234.2		MS 469 – Downtown Florence, Brandon	
Mississippi	Rankin	Richland	151.8	244.3		MS 149 north	
Mississippi	Rankin	Richland	152.6– 152.9	245.6– 246.1		East Frontage Road	Interchange; northbound exit and entrance
Mississippi	Rankin	Richland	152.6– 152.9	245.6– 246.1		West Frontage Road	Interchange; southbound exit and entrance
Mississippi	Rankin	Richland–Pearl line	153.8	247.5	47	I-20 east / I-55 north to US 80 – Meridian, Grenada, Flowood	Southern end of I-20/I-55 concurrency; exit 94 on I-55
Mississippi	Hinds	Jackson	154.3	248.3	45B	US 51 north	Southbound exit is exit 45
Mississippi	Hinds	Jackson	154.6	248.8	45A	Gallatin Street	Southbound exit is exit 45
Mississippi	Hinds	Jackson	155.3	249.9	44	I-55 south to US 51 south – McComb, New Orleans	Northern end of I-55 concurrency
Mississippi	Hinds	Jackson	155.6	250.4	43	Terry Road / University Boulevard	Signed as exits 43A (south) and 43B (north)
Mississippi	Hinds	Jackson	156.4	251.7	42	Ellis Avenue	Signed as exits 42A (south) and 42B (north)
Mississippi	Hinds	Jackson	159.7	257.0	41	I-20 west – Vicksburg I-220 begins	Northern end of I-20 concurrency; southern terminus of I-220
Mississippi	Hinds	Jackson	160	260	1	US 80 / MS 18 – Clinton, Pearl	Signed as exits 1A (east) and 1B (west)
Mississippi	Hinds	Jackson	161.3	259.6	2	Clinton Boulevard / Capitol Street	Signed as exits 2A (Capitol Street) and 2B (Clinton Blvd.) northbound
Mississippi	Hinds	Jackson	162.7	261.8	3	Industrial Drive	Diamond interchange
Mississippi	Hinds	Jackson	164.7	265.1	5	I-220 north / Medgar Evers Boulevard	Signed as exits 5A (Medgar Evers) and 5B (I-220); northern end of I-220 concurrency
Mississippi	Hinds	Jackson	167.1– 167.3	268.9– 269.2		Natchez Trace Parkway	Interchange
Mississippi	Madison	Flora	179.0	288.1		MS 22 – Edwards, Flora, Canton, Mississippi Petrified Forest National Natural Landmark	
Mississippi	Yazoo	Bentonia	186.3	299.8		MS 830 west – Bentonia	Eastern terminus of MS 830
Mississippi	Yazoo	Bentonia	187.0	300.9		MS 433 – Satartia, Bentonia	
Mississippi	Yazoo	Bentonia	187.7	302.1		MS 830 east – Bentonia	Western terminus of MS 830
Mississippi	Yazoo		200.7	323.0		MS 16 east – Benton, Canton	Southern end of MS 16 concurrency
Mississippi	Yazoo	Yazoo City	201.0	323.5		MS 16 west / MS 149 north – Downtown Yazoo City	Northern end of MS 16 concurrency
Mississippi	Yazoo	Yazoo City	204.2	328.6		US 49E north (Jerry Clower Boulevard) / US 49W north (Haley Barbour Parkway) to MS 3 south – Greenwood, Indianola, Vicksburg	Interchange; US 49 north splits into US 49E and US 49W
Mississippi	See US 49E and US 49W						
Mississippi	Tallahatchie	Tutwiler	0.0	0.0		US 49W south (MS 3 south) / US 49E south – Indianola, Greenwood	Southern end of MS 3 concurrency; US 49 south splits into US 49E and US 49W
Mississippi	Tallahatchie	Tutwiler	0.4	0.64		MS 3 north – Marks, Lambert	Northern end of MS 3 concurrency
Mississippi	Tallahatchie	Tutwiler	0.6	0.97		MS 726 west	
Mississippi	Coahoma	Clarksdale	12.5	20.1		MS 322 east	Southern end of MS 322 concurrency
Mississippi	Coahoma	Clarksdale	13.0	20.9		US 61 south / US 278 west / MS 322 west – Clarksdale, Cleveland, Greenville, Delta Blues Museum	Interchange; northern end of MS 322 concurrency; southern end of US 61/US 278 concurrency
Mississippi	Coahoma	Clarksdale	116.3– 117.0	187.2– 188.3		US 278 east / MS 6 – Clarksdale, Batesville	Northern end of US 278 concurrency
Mississippi	Coahoma		118.0	189.9		MS 161 south – Lyon, North Clarksdale	
Mississippi	Coahoma		27.3	43.9		Friars Point-Highway 61 / Highway 61-Jonestown – Friars Point, Moon Lake	Proposed MS 316
Mississippi	Coahoma		31.8	51.2		US 61 north / MS 315 south (Lula-Rich) / Great River Road – Tunica, Memphis, Sledge, Sardis	North end of US 61 overlap; south end of Great River Road overlap
Mississippi	Coahoma		37.9	61.0		MS 1 south – Friars Point, North Delta Museum	
Mississippi River			40.9 0.00	65.8 0.00	Helena Bridge		
Arkansas	Phillips	Helena-West Helena	0.99	1.59		US 49B north (Biscoe Drive) – Business District	
Arkansas	Phillips	Helena-West Helena	1.35	2.17		AR 20 to AR 44 – Lakeview, Elaine, Harbor and Industrial Park	Former AR 49
Arkansas	Phillips	Helena-West Helena	3.98	6.41		AR 242 to AR 185	
Arkansas	Phillips	Helena-West Helena	6.28	10.11		US 49B south (North Sebastian Street) – Business District	
Arkansas	Phillips	Helena-West Helena	6.88	11.07		AR 185 north – Municipal Airport	
Arkansas	Phillips	Walnut Corner	12.48	20.08		AR 1 north / AR 85 south – Barton, Lake View	
Arkansas	Phillips	Kindall	15.45	24.86		AR 316 north – Rondo	
Arkansas	Phillips	Poplar Grove	17.58	28.29		AR 316 south – Trenton	
Arkansas	Phillips	Marvell	20.62	33.18		AR 243 north	
Arkansas	Phillips	Marvell	21.52	34.63		AR 1 south – DeWitt	
Arkansas	Phillips		27.56	44.35		AR 39 south – Postelle, Turner	
Arkansas	Phillips		29.67	47.75		AR 86 west – Holly Grove	
Arkansas	Monroe		33.56	54.01		AR 362 east – Louisiana Purchase Historic State Park	
Arkansas	Monroe		35.60	57.29		AR 39 north – Blackton	
Arkansas	Monroe		36.70	59.06		AR 366	
Arkansas	Monroe		38.67	62.23		US 79 – Clarendon, Marianna, Stuttgart, Holly Grove	
Arkansas	Monroe		41.30	66.47		AR 39S east – Monroe	
Arkansas	Monroe		43.55	70.09		AR 39 south / AR 241 north – Rich	
Arkansas	Monroe		50.67	81.55		AR 238S west	
Arkansas	Monroe	Brinkley	51.80	83.36		US 70 west – DeValls Bluff	South end of US 70 overlap
Arkansas	Monroe	Brinkley	52.55	84.57		AR 238 east (West Sycamore Street)	
Arkansas	Monroe	Brinkley	53.39	85.92		US 70 east (West Cypress Street)	Northern end of US 70 concurrency
Arkansas	Monroe	Brinkley	54.97	88.47		I-40 / US 63 south – Little Rock, Memphis	Southern end of US 63 concurrency; exit 216 on I-40
Arkansas	Monroe	Brinkley	56.13	90.33		AR 17 north – Cotton Plant	
Arkansas	Woodruff		62.47	100.54		AR 38 west – Cotton Plant	
Arkansas	Woodruff	Hunter	66.28	106.67		AR 306 east to AR 78	
Arkansas	Woodruff		71.61	115.25		AR 269 north to AR 145	
Arkansas	Woodruff	Penrose	76.23	122.68		AR 284 east to AR 193	
Arkansas	Cross	Fair Oaks	80.26	129.17		US 64 west – Bald Knob	Southern end of US 64 concurrency
Arkansas	Cross	Fair Oaks	80.28	129.20		US 64 east – Wynne	Northern end of US 64 concurrency
Arkansas	Cross	Tilton	84.88	136.60		AR 364 east – Vanndale	
Arkansas	Cross	Hickory Ridge	90.44	145.55		AR 42 to AR 37 – Cherry Valley	
Arkansas	Poinsett	Fisher	96.67	155.58		AR 214 east – White Hall	
Arkansas	Poinsett	Waldenburg	102.74	165.34		AR 14 – Newport, Harrisburg	
Arkansas	Poinsett		104.9	168.8		AR 956-1 – Lake Hogue Public Fishing	
Arkansas	Poinsett		109.34	175.97		AR 214 west – Grubbs	
Arkansas	Poinsett–Craighead county line		113.42	182.53		AR 158	
Arkansas	Craighead	Jonesboro	120.50	193.93		AR 226 west / US 78 west to US 67	Southern end of US 78/AR 226 concurrency
Arkansas	Craighead	Jonesboro	122.4	197.0		AR 226 east (Woodsprings Road)	Northern end of AR 226 concurrency
Arkansas	Craighead	Jonesboro	125.53	202.02	45	I-555 north / US 63 north / AR 18 west (Southwest Drive) – Walnut Ridge, Hoxie	Northern end of US 63 concurrency; southern end of I-555 concurrency
Arkansas	Craighead	Jonesboro	43.4	69.8	44	AR 1B (Harrisburg Road)	
Arkansas	Craighead	Jonesboro	128.40	206.64	42	I-555 south / AR 1 south (Stadium Boulevard) / US 78 east / Caraway Road – Memphis, Harrisburg, Blytheville	Northern end of I-555/US 78 concurrency; southern end of AR 1 concurrency
Arkansas	Craighead	Jonesboro	129.53	208.46		AR 18 (East Highland Drive)	
Arkansas	Craighead	Jonesboro	131.74	212.01		AR 91 north (East Johnson Avenue) to AR 141 – Jonesboro Business District	Southern terminus of AR 91
Arkansas	Craighead	Jonesboro	132.31	212.93		AR 351 north (Old Greensboro Road)	Southern end of AR 351 concurrency
Arkansas	Craighead	Jonesboro	132.75	213.64		AR 351 – Airport	Northern end of AR 351 concurrency
Arkansas	Craighead		136.7	220.0		US 49B north – Brookland Business District	
Arkansas	Craighead		140.60	226.27		US 49B south – Brookland Business District	
Arkansas	Greene	Paragould	144.65	232.79		AR 69 north	
Arkansas	Greene	Paragould	146.85	236.33		US 412	
Arkansas	Greene	Paragould	147.34	237.12		AR 358 east	
Arkansas	Greene	Paragould	147.87	237.97		AR 358 west	
Arkansas	Greene	Paragould	149.71	240.93		US 412B / US 49B north – Walnut Ridge, Cardwell MO, Paragould Business District, Airport	
Arkansas	Greene	Paragould	149.97	241.35		US 49Y to US 412B west – Walnut Ridge	
Arkansas	Greene	Paragould	151.13	243.22		AR 135 – Corning, Business District	
Arkansas	Greene	Paragould	151.88	244.43		US 49B south	
Arkansas	Greene	Marmaduke	161.44	259.81		AR 34 – Business District	
Arkansas	Clay	Rector	168.86	271.75		AR 90 west – Rector Business District	Southern end of AR 90 concurrency
Arkansas	Clay	Rector	169.37	272.57		AR 119 south	
Arkansas	Clay	Hargrave Corner	172.33	277.34		AR 90 east – Kennett, MO	Northern end of AR 90 concurrency
Arkansas	Clay	Piggott	182.33	293.43		US 62 / AR 1 north	Northern terminus; northern end of AR 1 concurrency
1.000 mi = 1.609 km; 1.000 km = 0.621 mi: Concurrency terminus; Incomplete access; Route transition

== Related routes ==
=== U.S. Route 49E ===
U.S. Highway 49E
- Location: Yazoo City-Tutwiler
- Length: 85.862 mi (138.181 km)

U.S. Route 49E (US 49E) is an 85.86-mile-long (138.18 km) U.S. Highway in the Delta region of Mississippi. It travels through Yazoo, Holmes, Leflore, and Tallahatchie counties.

=== U.S. Route 49W ===
U.S. Highway 49W
- Location: Yazoo City-Tutwiler
- Length: 81.894 mi (131.796 km)

U.S. Route 49W (US 49W) is an 81.89-mile-long (131.79 km) U.S. Highway in the Delta Region of Mississippi, passing through Yazoo, Humphreys, Sunflower, and Tallahatchie counties.

=== Mississippi Highway 149 ===
Mississippi Highway 149
- Location: Stone, Covington, Simpson, Rankin, Yazoo, Humphreys, Sunflower, and Coahoma counties
- Length: 58.073 mi (93.459 km)
- Existed: 2006–present

Mississippi Highway 149 (MS 149) is a state highway in Mississippi. The route designation is given to six former segments of U.S. Route 49 (US 49), and two former sections of US 49W, within the state that have been bypassed. The sections run through Wiggins, Mount Olive, between Magee and Sanatorium, between Mendenhall and Braxton, in Richland, Mississippi, between Yazoo City and Silver City, Inverness, and Clarksdale. The total length of the eight sections of MS 149 is 58.073 miles (93.459 km).

=== Arkansas Highway 349 ===
Highway 349
- Location: Craighead and Lawrence counties
- Length: 6.89 mi (11.09 km)
- Existed: November 23, 1966–present

Arkansas Highway 349 is a designation for two state highways in Northeast Arkansas. One route of 4.45 miles (7.16 km) begins at Highway 226 and runs north to Highway 18/Highway 91. A second route of 2.44 miles (3.93 km) begins at Highway 230 and runs north to Highway 228. Both routes are maintained by the Arkansas Department of Transportation (ArDOT).
