= Special routes of U.S. Route 49 =

Special routes of U.S. Route 49

Highway system
- United States Numbered Highway System; List; Special; Divided

Several special routes of U.S. Route 49 exist. In order from south to north they are as follows.

== Existing ==
=== Helena-West Helena business route ===
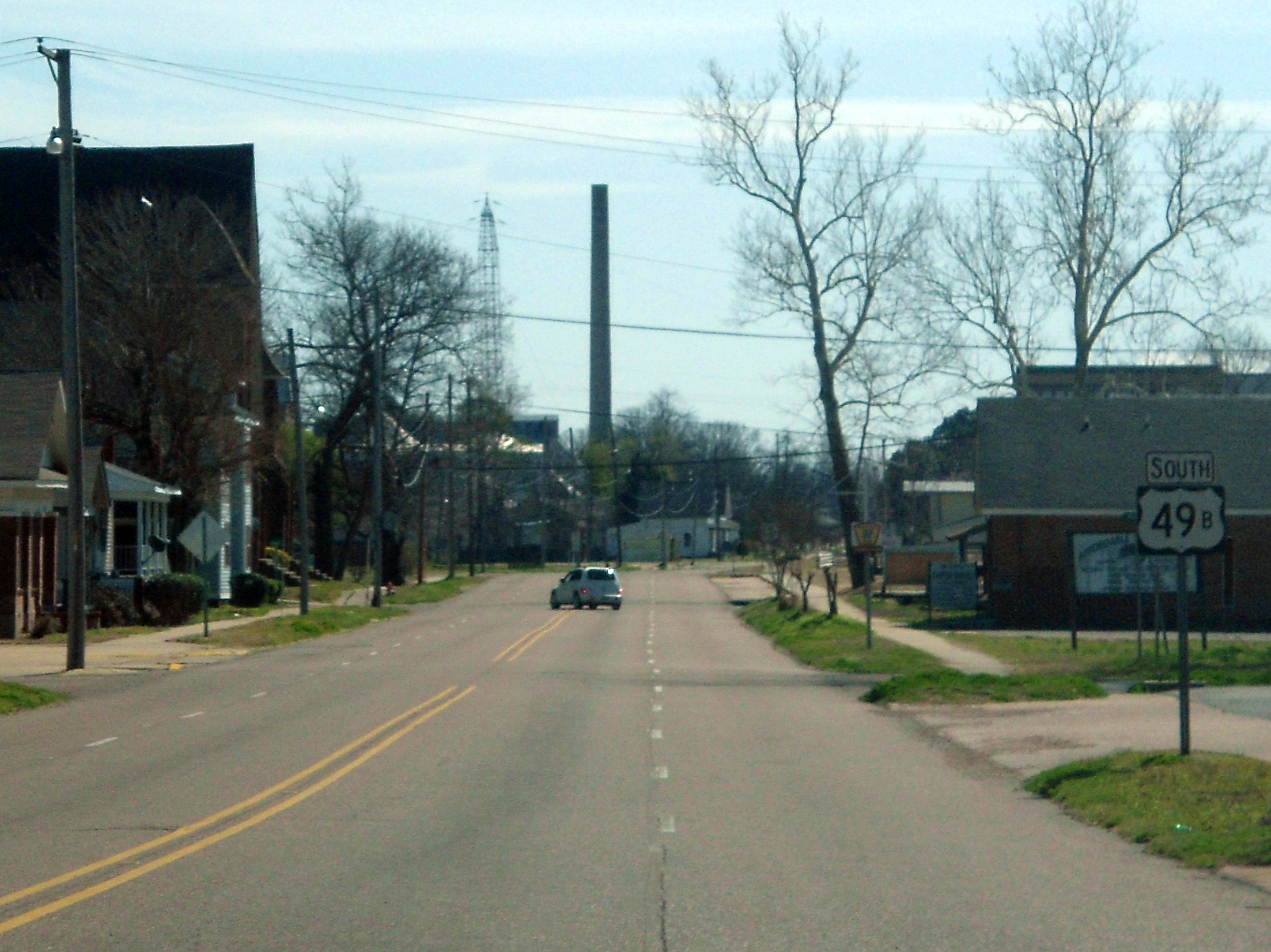
US 49B runs south near the Centennial Baptist Church in Helena-West Helena, AR

U.S. Highway 49B
- Location: Helena-West Helena, Arkansas
- Length: 6.92 mi (11.14 km)
- Existed: June 24, 1970–present

U.S. Highway 49 Business (US 49B, Hwy. 49B) is a 6.92-mile (11.14 km) business route of U.S. Route 49 in Phillips County.

The route's northern terminus is at US 49 in Helena-West Helena. It runs south as Sebastian Street and splits into two divided one-way streets known as Plaza Avenue at a junction Highway 242. These routes overlap for 0.13 miles (0.21 km) until Highway 242 turns north along 4th Street, where a concurrency with Crowley's Ridge Parkway (CRP). The one-way streets merge and become Richmond Drive headed east. US 49B passes the Faust House, Myers House, Central High School and the Helena Country Club before meeting the former corporate limit of West Helena prior to their 2005 merger. The route winds and splits into two divided one-way streets begin as it enters the area formerly designated as Helena. After a junction with Highway 185 the routes pass several historical properties on the National Register of Historic Places, including the Altman House, Beech Street Historic District, James C. Tappan House, Coolidge House, and the Jerome Bonaparte Pillow House. Highway 49B turns south onto Columbia Street, with CRP continuing eastbound on city streets toward the business district, while also intersecting the Great River Road, which runs northbound on Columbia Street and eastbound on Perry Street. US 49B runs south past the Allin House, William Nicholas Straub House, Centennial Baptist Church, and the St. Mary's Catholic Church. The route continues south past the Keesee House, William A. Short House, and Estevan Hall before becoming Biscoe Street and terminating at the parent route.

The route was designated June 24, 1970 following completion of a US 49 bypass around Helena and West Helena. The former US 49 alignment through downtown Helena and West Helena was assigned the US 49B designation.

Major intersections
The entire route is in Helena-West Helena, Phillips County.

mi	km	Destinations	Notes
0.00	0.00	US 49 (Martin Luther King Jr. Drive) – Brinkley, Clarksdale, MS	Northern terminus
1.36– 1.49	2.19– 2.40	AR 242 (Sebastian Street / 4th Street) / Crowley's Ridge Pkwy. north	Begin CRP overlap
4.33	6.97	AR 185 south (Perry Street)	AR 185 northern terminus
		Crowley's Ridge Pkwy. south (Perry Street / Porter Street) / Great River Road (Columbia Street / Perry Street)	End CRP overlap
6.92	11.14	US 49 (Martin Luther King Jr. Drive) – Brinkley, Clarksdale, MS	Southern terminus
1.000 mi = 1.609 km; 1.000 km = 0.621 mi: Concurrency terminus

=== Brookland business route ===
U.S. Highway 49B
- Location: Brookland, Arkansas
- Length: 3.66 mi (5.89 km)
- Existed: July 28, 2000–present

U.S. Highway 49 Business (US 49B and Hwy. 49B) is a 3.66-mile (5.89 km) business route of U.S. Route 49 in Craighead County. The route's southern terminus is at US 49 and Highway 1 (AR 1) in south Brookland. It runs north as Holman Street, passing the Brookland City Hall and Brookland High School. North of the high school, US 49B runs due north to meet Arkansas Highway 230 and eventually intersect US 49/AR 1 to terminate.

This roadway was originally part of AR 1, designated in 1926 in Arkansas's initial state highway system. US 49 overlapped AR 1 through the area after extension in 1978.

Major intersections
The entire route is in Brookland, Craighead County.

mi	km	Destinations	Notes
0.00	0.00	US 49 / AR 1 – Jonesboro, Paragould	Southern terminus
2.37	3.81	AR 230 east – Dixie	AR 230 western terminus
3.66	5.89	US 49 / AR 1 – Jonesboro, Paragould	Northern terminus
1.000 mi = 1.609 km; 1.000 km = 0.621 mi

=== Paragould business route ===
U.S. Highway 49B
- Location: Paragould, Arkansas
- Length: 2.36 mi (3.80 km)
- Existed: August 22, 1979–present

U.S. Highway 49 Business (US 49B and Hwy. 49B) is a 2.36-mile (3.80 km) business route of U.S. Route 49 in Greene County. Posted as US 49B, the route's northern terminus is at US 49 in north Paragould. It runs south and intersects AR 135 near the Greene County Fairgrounds. The route continues south as 3rd Street, passing near the historic National Bank of Commerce Building, the Paragould War Memorial, the Paragould Downtown Commercial Historic District, and the Gulf Oil Company Service Station to terminate at US 412.

Following the designation of Highway 1 as US 49 between Jonesboro and Piggott, AR 1B in Paragould was redesignated as US 49B on August 22, 1979.

Major intersections
The entire route is in Paragould, Greene County.

mi	km	Destinations	Notes
0.0	0.0	US 49 / AR 1 – Jonesboro, Piggott	Northern terminus
0.99	1.59	AR 135 north	AR 135 southern terminus
2.36	3.80	US 412B east (Kings Highway) / Crowley's Ridge Pkwy. north	Begin US 412/CRP overlap
		US 49 / AR 1 (Linwood Drive) / US 412B west / Crowley's Ridge Pkwy. south (Kings Highway) – Jonesboro, Paragould	Southern terminus, end US 412 overlap
1.000 mi = 1.609 km; 1.000 km = 0.621 mi: Concurrency terminus

=== Paragould connector route ===
Court Street
- Location: Paragould, Arkansas
- Length: 0.379 mi (610 m)
- Existed: March 18, 1981–present

U.S. Highway 49Y (US 49Y, Hwy. 49Y, and Court Street, formerly AR 1Y and AR 25Y) is a short connector route in Paragould, Arkansas. It is maintained by the Arkansas Department of Transportation (ArDOT). Highway 49Y begins at US 49 and Highway 1 (Linwood Drive) west of downtown Paragould. The highway runs due west, with the Paragould High School on the north side of the road and an industrial area along the south side. US 49Y terminates at US Highway 412 Business (US 412B) and the Crowley's Ridge Parkway (Kingshighway) just south of Kirk Field.

The ArDOT maintains US 49Y like all other parts of the state highway system. As a part of these responsibilities, the Department tracks the volume of traffic using its roads in surveys using a metric called average annual daily traffic (AADT). ArDOT estimates the traffic level for a segment of roadway for any average day of the year in these surveys. As of 2020, AADT was estimated to be 8,900 vehicles per day (VPD).

In a May 1963 Arkansas Highway Department report, an unsigned section of state highway along Court Street in Paragould between 15th Street and Second Street was identified for deletion from the state highway system. In May 1968, the City of Paragould requested exchanging this roadway for a new state highway designation along Court Street between Highway 25 and a newly constructed Highway 1 (15th Street). The Highway Commission agreed to the request on June 26, 1968, designating it as Highway 1Y and declaring it would "provide a desirable connection between the two State Highways and would eliminate indirection of travel to motorists". The designation was renumbered to Highway 25Y in 1979 when Highway 1B became US 49B.

After US 412 supplanted Highway 25 between Walnut Ridge and Missouri in 1980, the highway was renumbered US 49Y.

Major intersections
The entire route is in Paragould, Greene County.

mi	km	Destinations	Notes
0.000	0.000	US 49 / AR 1 (Linwood Drive) – Piggott, Jonesboro	Eastern terminus
0.379	0.610	US 412B / Crowley's Ridge Pkwy. (Kingshighway) to US 412 – Walnut Ridge, Cardwell, MO	Western terminus
1.000 mi = 1.609 km; 1.000 km = 0.621 mi

== Former ==
=== Hattiesburg business loop ===
U.S. Highway 49 Business
- Location: Hattiesburg, Mississippi
- Existed: yes

=== Greenwood business loop ===
U.S. Highway 49E Business
- Location: Greenwood, Mississippi
- Existed: yes

=== Jonesboro business loop ===
U.S. Highway 49B
- Location: Jonesboro, Arkansas
- Length: 5.2 mi (8.4 km)
- Existed: June 25, 1979–November 26, 1996

U.S. Highway 49 Business (US 49B and Hwy. 49B) is a former 5.2-mile (8.4 km) business route of U.S. Route 49 in Craighead County.

The route was created following an Arkansas State Highway Commission request to extend US 49 along Highway 1 between Jonesboro and Piggott. It was approved by the United States Route Number Committee of American Association of State Highway and Transportation Officials (AASHTO) on June 25, 1979. It was truncated at the end of the one-way pair in downtown Jonesboro near Cate Street on April 25, 1996. The remainder was deleted eight months later, with pieces redesignated as Highway 18, Highway 141, and US 63B.

Major intersections
The entire route was in Jonesboro, Craighead County.

mi	km	Destinations	Notes
0.0	0.0	US 49 / US 63	Southern terminus
1.3	2.1	US 63B east / AR 18 east (Highland Drive)	Begin US 63B/AR 18 overlap
2.9	4.7	US 63B west / AR 18 west (Johnson Avenue) / AR 141 north (Main Street)	End US 63B/AR 18 overlap, AR 141 southern terminus
5.2	8.4	US 49 / AR 1	Northern terminus
1.000 mi = 1.609 km; 1.000 km = 0.621 mi: Concurrency terminus

== Sources ==
- "Minutes of the Meeting of the Arkansas State Highway Commission" (PDF). Little Rock: Arkansas State Highway Commission. 1953–1969. OCLC 21798861. Archived from the original (PDF) on October 1, 2018.
- "Minutes of the Meeting of the Arkansas State Highway Commission" (PDF). Little Rock: Arkansas State Highway Commission. 1970–1979. OCLC 21798861. Archived from the original (PDF) on November 5, 2011.
- "Minutes of the Meeting of the Arkansas State Highway Commission" (PDF). Little Rock: Arkansas State Highway Commission. 1980–1989. OCLC 21798861. Archived from the original (PDF) on March 28, 2016.
- "Minutes of the Meeting of the Arkansas State Highway Commission" (PDF). Little Rock: Arkansas State Highway Commission. 1990–1999. OCLC 21798861. Archived from the original (PDF) on July 21, 2019.
- "Minutes of the Meeting of the Arkansas State Highway Commission" (PDF). Little Rock: Arkansas State Highway Commission. 2000–2009. OCLC 21798861. Archived from the original (PDF) on March 24, 2016.
- "Minutes of the Meeting of the Arkansas State Highway Commission" (PDF). Little Rock: Arkansas State Highway Commission. 2010–2019. OCLC 21798861. Archived from the original (PDF) on March 4, 2016.
