= Arkansas Highway 242 =

State highway in Arkansas, United States

Highway 242

Route information
- Maintained by ArDOT
- Length: 14.74 mi (23.72 km)
- Tourist routes: Crowley's Ridge Parkway

Major junctions
- West end: AR 1 west of Lexa
- US 49, Helena-West Helena
- East end: AR 44 south of Helena-West Helena

Location
- Country: United States
- State: Arkansas
- Counties: Phillips

Highway system
- Arkansas Highway System; Interstate; US; State; Business; Spurs; Suffixed; Scenic; Heritage
← AR 241	→ AR 243

Arkansas Highway 242 (AR 242, Hwy. 242) is an east–west state highway in Phillips County, Arkansas. The route of 14.74 miles (23.72 km) runs from Highway 44 near Helena-West Helena north through the city and through the St. Francis National Forest to Highway 1 near Lexa. A segment of the route is part of the Mississippi River Trail, essentially a bicycle-friendly version of the Great River Road.

== Route description ==
AR 242 begins at AR 1 west of Lexa and heads east through town as 1st Street. It crosses over Lick Creek and passes by Thompson-Robbins Airport. The route then intersects its only spur route near the St. Francis National Forest before turning to the southeast. The route then intersects AR 185 before entering West Helena. It passes by the Denison House, listed on the National Register of Historic Places and at the intersection of Plaza Avenue, the route runs concurrently with US 49B for 0.1 miles (0.16 km). It then goes southeast on Sebastian Street, running concurrent with another route of AR 185 until reaching South 7th on Russell. The route then intersects another route of AR 185 by the Helena Country Club and then intersects US 49 (Martin Luther King Jr. Drive), a four-lane divided highway, at an at-grade intersection in the south part of the city. The highway then turns to the southwest and reaches its eastern terminus at AR 44.

Beginning from the end of the Highway 1 to the US 49B concurrency, the route is designated as part of the Mississippi River Trail, a 3,000 miles (4,800 km) bike route from New Orleans to Minnesota along the Mississippi River.

== Major intersections ==
Mile markers reset at concurrencies. The entire route is in Phillips County.

Location	mi	km	Destinations	Notes
Lexa Junction	10.15	16.33	AR 1 – Walnut Corner, Marianna	Western terminus
Helena-West Helena	2.19	3.52	CR 217 / Crowley's Ridge Pkwy. north (St. Francis Scenic Byway / AR 242S) – Storm Creek Lake Recreation Area	
Helena-West Helena	1.75	2.82	AR 185 south	
Helena-West Helena	0.00	0.00	US 49B south / Crowley's Ridge Pkwy. south (Plaza Street) to AR 185 south	West end of US 49B overlap
Helena-West Helena	4.59	7.39	US 49B north – Brinkley, Memphis	East end of US 49B overlap
Helena-West Helena	3.32	5.34	AR 185 north	
Helena-West Helena	3.08	4.96	US 49 – Clarksdale, MS, Brinkley	
	0.00	0.00	AR 44 / Great River Road	Eastern terminus
1.000 mi = 1.609 km; 1.000 km = 0.621 mi: Concurrency terminus

== Spur route ==
Storm Creek Road
- Location: north of West Helena
- Length: 0.11 mi (180 m)

Arkansas Highway 242 Spur (AR 242S, Hwy. 242S, or Storm Creek Road) is a spur route in the St. Francis National Forest. It is 0.11 miles (0.18 km) in length.
