= Cherry Street Historic District (Helena–West Helena, Arkansas) =

Historic district in Arkansas, United States

- U.S. National Register of Historic Places
- U.S. Historic district
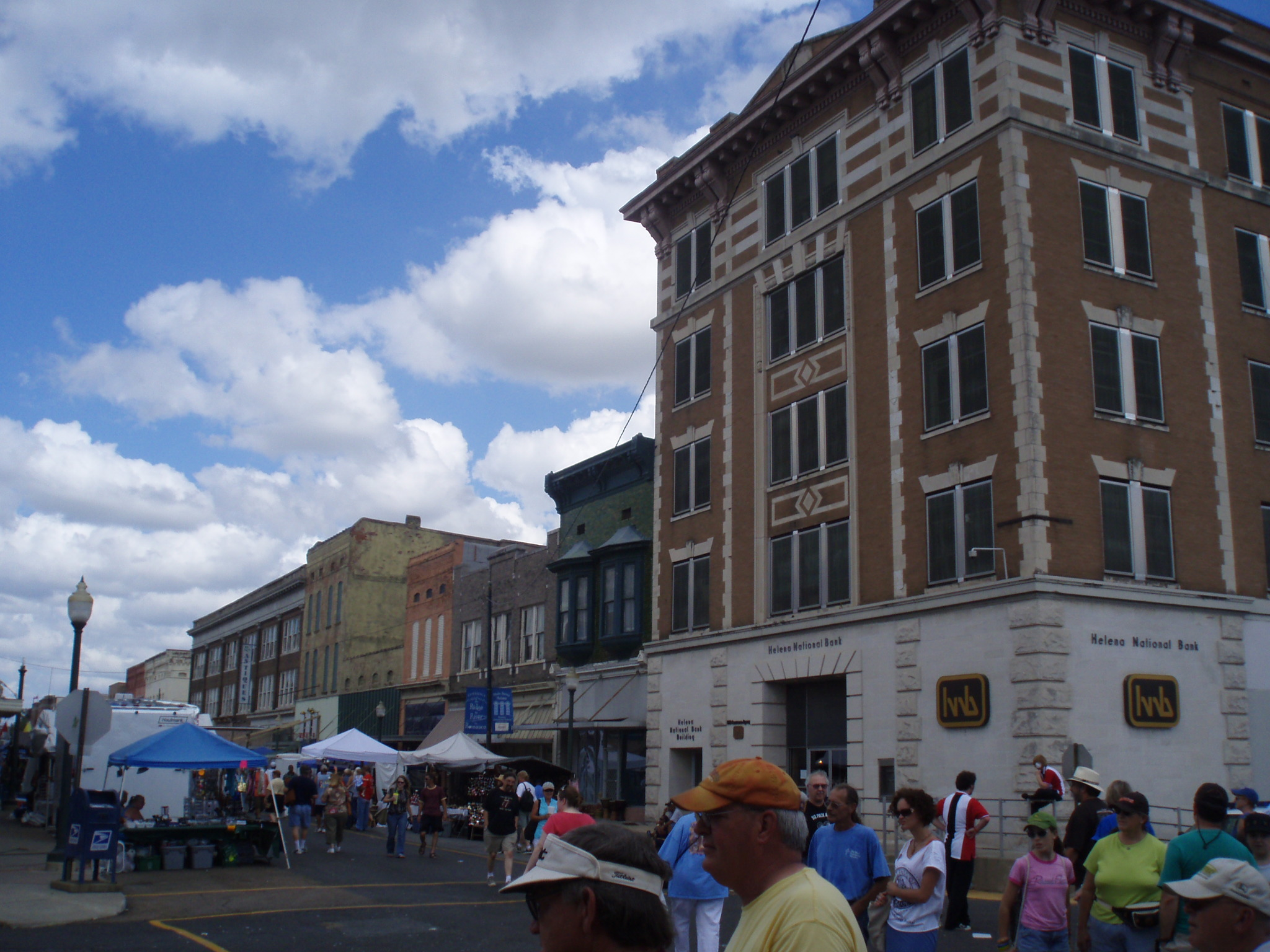
- Cherry Street during the Arkansas Blues and Heritage Festival, October 2007

- Location within Arkansas Location within the United States
- Location: Along Cherry St. between Porter and Elm Sts., Helena–West Helena, Arkansas
- Coordinates: 34.52641°N 90.58619°W
- Area: 17.5 acres (7.1 ha)
- Built: 1879
- Built by: John Isaac Moore
- Architectural style: Classical Revival, Early Commercial, Commercial Vernacular
- NRHP reference No.: 86003546 (original); 10000288 (increase)

Significant dates
- Added to NRHP: August 17, 1987
- Boundary increase: May 27, 2010

The Cherry Street Historic District is a historic neighborhood, commercial, and entertainment district serving as the downtown of Helena in Helena–West Helena, Arkansas. Cherry Street is located between Elm Street and the nearby Phillips County Courthouse to the north, and Porter Street to the south. The history of Cherry Street is tied to the blues heritage of the area beginning in the 1940s.

== History ==
Around the time of incorporation of West Helena in 1917, the lumber industry was the primary economic force in the region, with five companies producing barrel staves being the primary employers. Prohibition put these companies out of business, followed by two devastating floods in the following decades left Helena and West Helena in bad shape for the approaching Depression. King Biscuit Time, a blues radio show, was produced for the first time in November 1941 by KFFA. This radio show helped spread the growing sensation of blues music and popularized many blues pioneers such as Robert Lockwood, Jr., Robert Lee McCollum, and Sonny Boy Williamson II.

== Today ==
Cherry Street has hosted the King Biscuit Blues Festival annually since 1986, under various names.

== See also ==
- Crowley's Ridge Parkway, a National Scenic Byway which runs down Cherry Street
- National Register of Historic Places listings in Phillips County, Arkansas
