= Arkansas Highway 185 =

State highway in Arkansas, United States

Highway 185

Route information
- Maintained by ArDOT

Section 1
- Length: 2.27 mi (3.65 km)
- South end: AR 242 in Helena-West Helena
- North end: US 49B in Helena-West Helena

Section 2
- Length: 2.56 mi (4.12 km)
- South end: US 49 near Wycamp
- North end: AR 242 north of Helena-West Helena

Section 3
- Length: 2.67 mi (4.30 km)
- South end: County Road 215, Lee County
- North end: AR 44 near Marianna

Location
- Country: United States
- State: Arkansas

Highway system
- Arkansas Highway System; Interstate; US; State; Business; Spurs; Suffixed; Scenic; Heritage
← AR 184	→ AR 186

Arkansas Highway 185 (AR 185, Ark. 185, and Hwy. 185) is the designation for a state highway in the U.S. state of Arkansas. The route is split into three sections, which are all located in eastern Arkansas. The first section begins at AR 242 and ends at US Highway 49 Business (US 49B) in Helena-West Helena. The second section begins at US 49 near Wycamp, or just west of Helena-West Helena, and ends at AR 242 just north of Helena-West Helena. The third section begins at County Road 215 (CR 215) in Lee County and ends at AR 44 near Marianna.

== Route description ==
=== Helena-West Helena route ===
The southern terminus for AR 185 is at AR 242 in West Helena, just east of US 49. The route heads almost directly east for about 2.3 miles (3.7 km), directly traveling through Crowley's Ridge before reaching its northern terminus at US 49B in Helena. The route itself does not intersect any other signed highways.

=== Airport Road ===
The southern terminus for AR 185 is at US 49 in Wycamp, or just west of West Helena. The route heads north for about one mile (1.6 km), before reaching an intersection near Thompson-Robbins Airport. The route heads almost directly east for about 1.5 miles (2.4 km) until it reaches its northern terminus at AR 242 just north of Helena-West Helena.

=== Lee County route ===
The southern terminus for AR 185 in Lee County is at CR 215 in the St. Francis National Forest. The route heads almost directly north for about 2.7 miles (4.3 km) before reaching its northern terminus at AR 44 just east of Marianna. The route is very rural and does not intersect any other highways or communities.

== Major intersections ==
County	Location	mi	km	Destinations	Notes
Phillips	Helena-West Helena	0.00	0.00	AR 242 – West Helena	Southern terminus
Phillips	Helena-West Helena	2.28	3.67	US 49B – Helena	Northern terminus
Gap in route
Phillips	Wycamp	0.00	0.00	US 49 – Helena-West Helena, Brinkley	Southern terminus
Phillips		1.01	1.63	CR 204 – Thompson-Robbins Airport	
Phillips		2.55	4.10	AR 242 – West Helena, Lexa	Northern terminus
Gap in route
Lee		0.00	0.00	CR 215	Southern terminus
Lee	Marianna	2.55	4.10	AR 44 – Marianna	Northern terminus
1.000 mi = 1.609 km; 1.000 km = 0.621 mi
