= Pfeiffer House and Carriage House =

Historic house in Arkansas, United States

- U.S. National Register of Historic Places
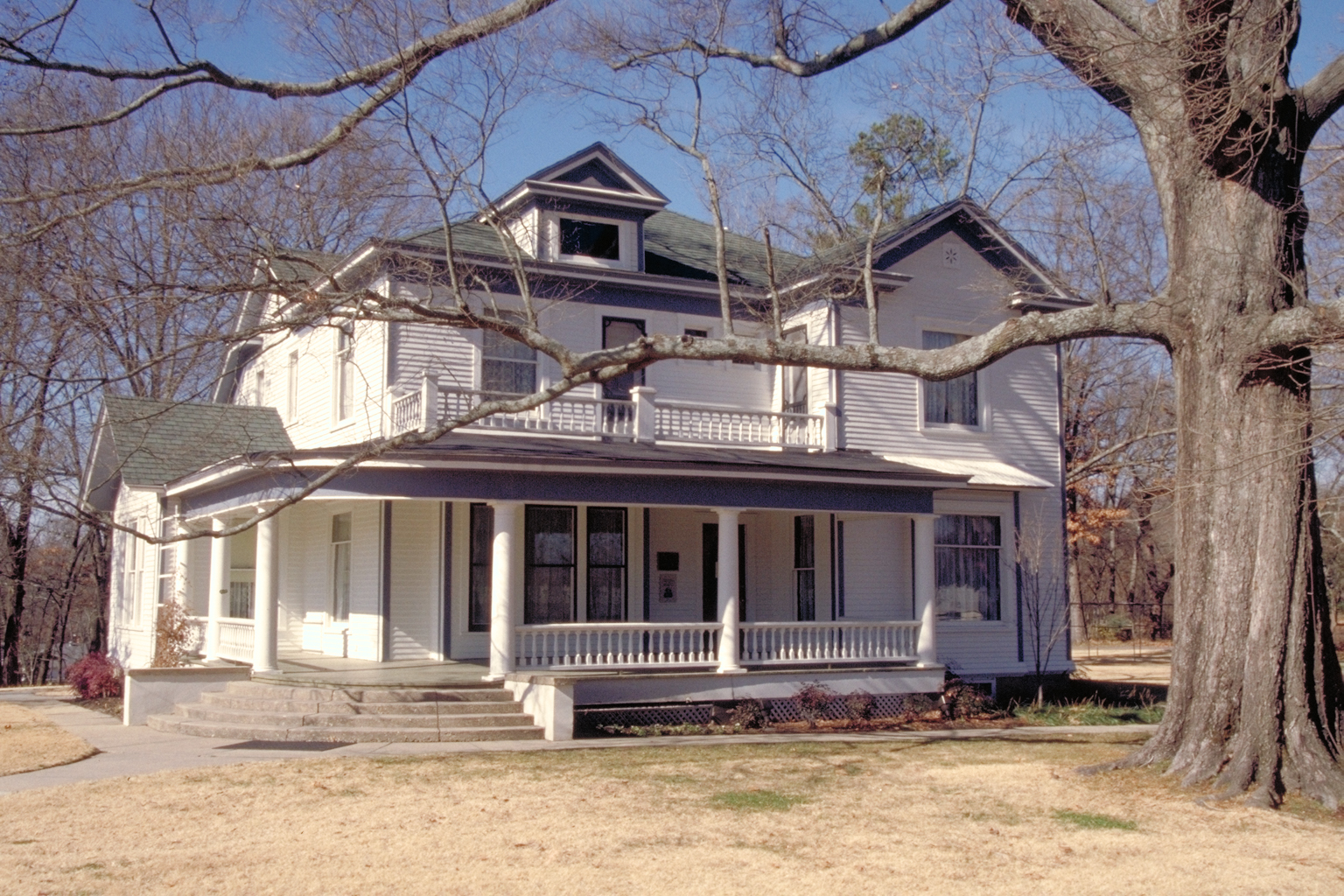
- Ernest Hemingway wrote portions of his novel A Farewell to Arms at this home, now a visitor center of the Crowley's Ridge Parkway.

- Location within Arkansas Location within the United States
- Location: Piggott, Arkansas
- Coordinates: 36°23′4.26″N 90°12′0.49″W
- Built: 1927
- Architectural style: Colonial Revival
- NRHP reference No.: 82002097
- Added to NRHP: June 10, 1982

The Hemingway-Pfeiffer House, also known as the Pfeiffer House and Carriage House, is a historic house museum at 10th and Cherry Streets in Piggott, Arkansas. It is where novelist Ernest Hemingway wrote portions of his 1929 novel A Farewell to Arms. Hemingway was married to Pauline Pfeiffer, the daughter of the owners of the house, Paul and Mary Pfeiffer.

== Overview ==
Pauline Pfeiffer, Hemingway's second wife, had grown up in the home. Her uncle Gustavus Pfeiffer was a benefactor of the couple, even financing an African safari trip that inspired Hemingway's Green Hills of Africa.

Hemingway did his writing in a barn behind the home which he converted into a writing studio. The space is decorated with items that would have been found in the studio when Hemingway used it.

== Modern use ==
The house is now the home of Arkansas State University's Hemingway-Pfeiffer Museum and Educational Center. The mission statement of the center is to "contribute to the regional, national and global understanding of the 1920s and 1930s eras by focusing on the internationally connected Pfeiffer family, of Piggott, Arkansas, and their son-in-law Ernest Hemingway." The center is also the visitor center for the Crowley's Ridge Parkway.

The property also includes the Matilda and Karl Pfeiffer Education Center, a Tudor-style home where Pauline's brother and his wife lived before it was opened to the public in 2004.

== See also ==
- Ernest Hemingway House (Key West, Florida)
- National Register of Historic Places listings in Clay County, Arkansas
