= Jerome Bonaparte Pillow House =

Historic house in Arkansas, United States

- U.S. National Register of Historic Places
- U.S. Historic district – Contributing property
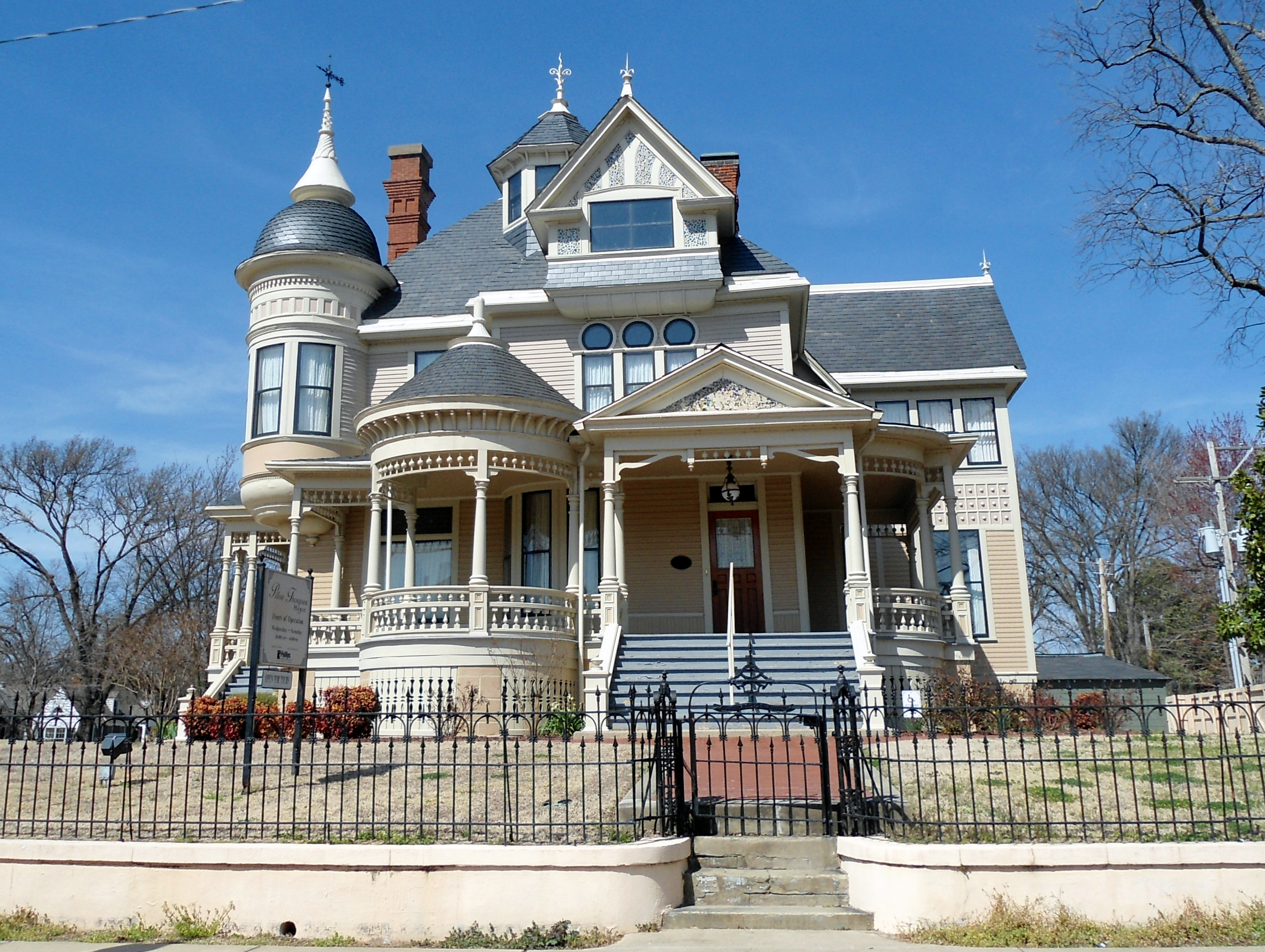
- Pillow House, March 2013

- Location within Arkansas Location within the United States
- Location: 718 Perry Street, Helena, Arkansas
- Coordinates: 34°31′44″N 90°35′31″W
- Area: less than one acre
- Architectural style: Queen Anne
- Part of: Beech Street Historic District (ID86003314)
- NRHP reference No.: 73000385

Significant dates
- Added to NRHP: May 7, 1973
- Designated CP: January 30, 1987

The Jerome Bonaparte Pillow House (sometimes the Thompson-Pillow House) is a historic house at 718 Perry Street in Helena, Arkansas. Architect George Barber designed the house, and it was built by Jerome B. Pillow in 1896. The building was donated to the Phillips Community College of the University of Arkansas Foundation and was restored by that body as well as several members of the community who were successful in restoring the property to its original Queen Anne beauty. The Thompson-Pillow House was placed on the National Register of Historic Places in 1973 and was opened after restoration in 1997.

== Architecture ==
The Pillow - Thompson House exhibits many key characteristics of Queen Anne architecture, and is one of the finest examples of the style in Helena. The wraparound porch, overhanging gables, ornamented eaves, spindel work, polygon tower, and terra cotta roof tiles are all common in homes of the period built in the Queen Anne style. The exterior columns and balustrades are also common in similar structures.

== See also ==
- National Register of Historic Places listings in Phillips County, Arkansas
