= Helena Bridge =

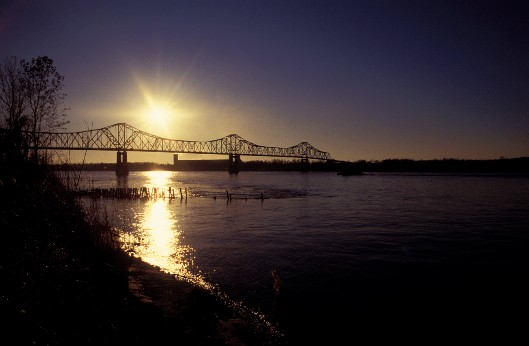
- Coordinates: 34°29′48″N 90°35′17″W
- Carries: 2 lanes of US 49
- Crosses: Mississippi River
- Locale: Helena, Arkansas and Lula, Mississippi
- ID number: 000000000002899

Characteristics
- Design: Cantilever bridge
- Total length: 5,204 feet (1,586 m)
- Width: 28 feet (9 m)
- Longest span: 804 feet (245 m)
- Clearance below: 119 feet (36 m)

History
- Opened: July 27, 1961

Statistics
- Daily traffic: 6,000 (2007)

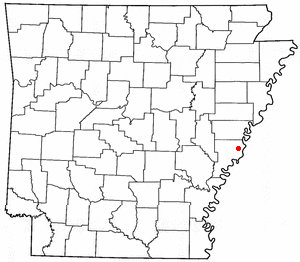
Location of Helena, Arkansas

Crossing Helena Bridge

The Helena Bridge is a cantilever bridge carrying U.S. Route 49 across the Mississippi River between Helena, Arkansas and Lula, Mississippi.

The main cantilever span was modeled on the similar Benjamin G. Humphreys Bridge which had been built downstream by Arkansas and Mississippi roughly two decades earlier. However, the river navigation issues that led to the replacement of the Humphreys Bridge with the Greenville Bridge do not apply to the Helena Bridge, as the river curve here is far less severe than the one just upstream from the Humphreys and Greenville Bridges.

The bridge had a stated construction cost of $14 million, and was opened as a toll bridge in 1961 until that initial cost was repaid. The total length of the bridge is slightly less than a mile and it replaced an earlier ferry. The bridge superstructure suffered its first substantial damage from a barge accident in July 1997.

== See also ==
- List of crossings of the Lower Mississippi River
