= Thompson–Robbins Airport =

Airport in Phillips County, Arkansas

Thompson–Robbins Airport Thompson–Robbins Army Airfield
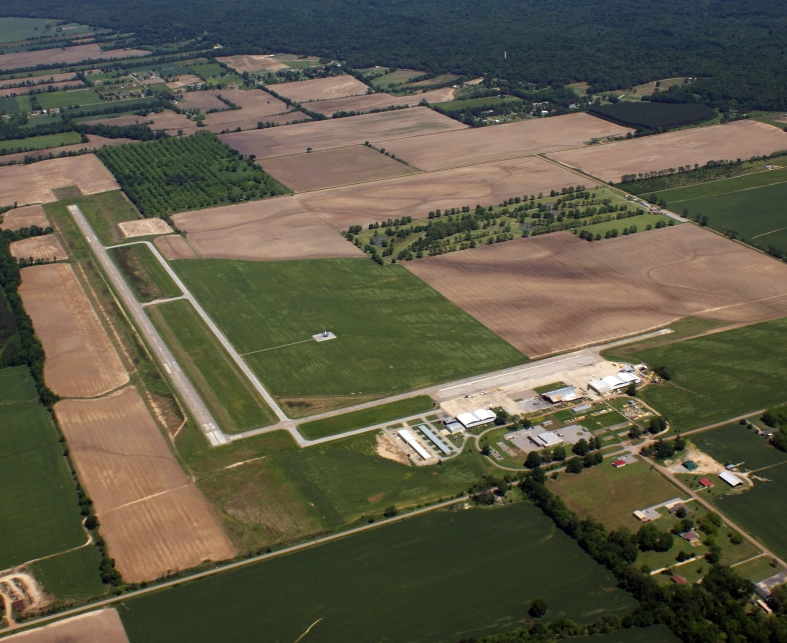
- IATA: HEE; ICAO: KHEE; FAA LID: HEE

Summary
- Airport type: Public
- Owner: City of Helena–West Helena
- Serves: Helena–West Helena, Arkansas, United States
- Opened: October 4, 1941
- Built: 1941
- Elevation AMSL: 242 ft / 74 m
- Coordinates: 34°34′35″N 90°40′33″W

Map
- Location HEE (the United States)

Runways
Direction	Length		Surface
Direction	ft	m	Surface
17/35	5,000	1,524	Asphalt
8/26	3,009	917	Asphalt

Statistics (2009)
- Aircraft operations: 35,000
- Based aircraft: 42
- Source: Federal Aviation Administration

Thompson–Robbins Airport (IATA: HEE, ICAO: KHEE, FAA LID: HEE) is 6 miles (9.7 km) northwest of the center of Helena–West Helena, in unincorporated Phillips County, Arkansas, United States. It is owned by the city of Helena–West Helena.

The FAA's National Plan of Integrated Airport Systems for 2011–2015 called it a general aviation airport.

== Facilities ==
Thompson–Robbins Airport covers 610 acres (250 ha) at an elevation of 242 feet (74 m). It has two asphalt runways: 17/35 is 5,000 by 96 feet (1,524 x 29 m) and 8/26 is 3,009 by 60 feet (917 x 18 m).

In the year ending July 31, 2009 the airport had 35,000 aircraft operations, average 95 per day: 97.1% general aviation, 1.4% air taxi, and 1.4% military. Forty-two aircraft were then based at the airport: 79% single-engine, 17% multi-engine, 2% jet, and 2% helicopter.

== History ==
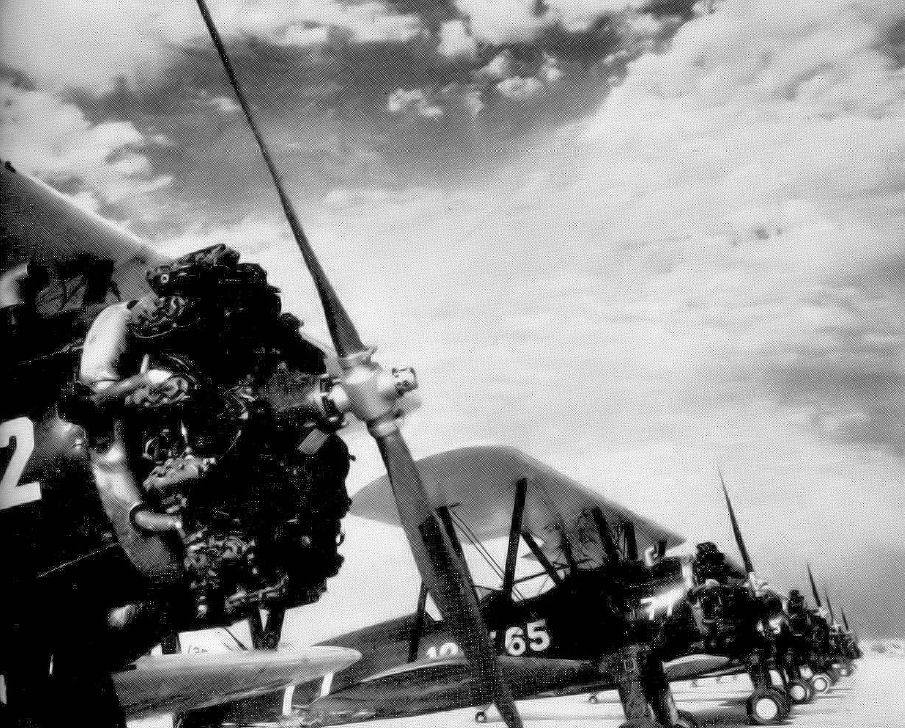
PT-17 Stearman biplanes on Flight Line at Thompson–Robbins Field, 1943

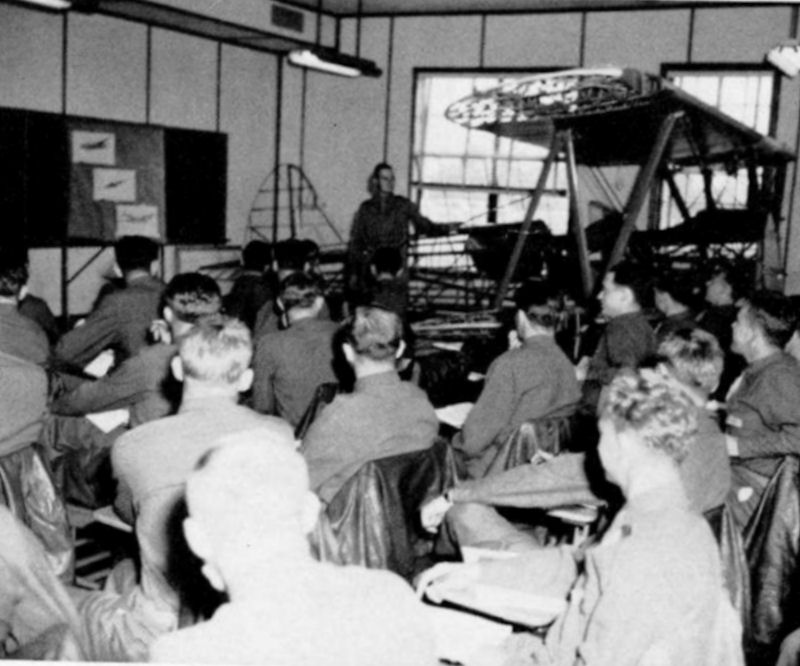
Flight cadets in a ground class

=== Helena Aero Tech ===
In preparation for the eventual U.S. entry into World War II, the United States Army Air Corps sought to expand the nation's combat air forces by asking civilian flight schools to provide the primary phase of training for air cadets. The Army Air Corps flying school at Randolph Field, Texas could only graduate 500 pilots a year, and most of the current Air Corps pilots did not have enough flying hours to be instructors.

To address this problem and ramp up training for new pilots, the commanding general of the AAF, Henry Arnold, devised a plan for primary contract flying schools located in local communities. Consequently, it contracted with civilian flying schools to provide primary flying training, with the graduates being moved on to basic and advanced training at regular military training airfields. The Air Corps would supply the trainees and planes, pay for the training, and buy back the buildings after the schools closed. Local communities often furnished the land.

The cities of Helena and West Helena acquired 640 acres of land adjoining the existing airport at West Helena for the school. Akron Airways of Ohio contracted to build the school, and construction started on July 20, 1941.

The flight school was activated as Helena Aero Tech on October 4, 1941. The airfield was dedicated as the Thompson–Robbins Airfield on December 6, 1941, in honor of two Helena flyers killed in AAF flying accidents: Lieutenant Jerome Pillow Thompson, who died on June 17, 1933, and Lieutenant Jack Stewart Robbins, who died on November 8, 1940. The first accident at the field took place on December 15, 1941, was a landing accident involving a PT-17 flown by cadet William H. Moore. The first fatality at the field was on July 1, 1943. It was a landing accident involving a PT-23 flown by cadet Eric W.T. Lord of North Carolina.

The school was under the jurisdiction of the 59th Flying Training Detachment, 29th Flying Training Wing. It was equipped with PT-17 Stearmans as its primary trainer. In addition Thompson–Robbins field had some Fairchild PT-19 and PT-23s.

The physical facilities of Thompson–Robbins Field included administrative buildings and quarters for officers and enlisted men, encircling a central location. A consolidated mess hall, which accommodated 1,000 enlisted men and a limited number of' officers, was located nearby. Adjacent to the mess hall was a Post Exchange, a Service Club and a dance floor.

It performed contract training until the airfield was inactivated on 4 August 1944 with the drawdown of AAFTC's pilot training program. 3,985 student pilots graduated from the school at Thompson–Robbins. With the closure of the field, the planes and furniture of the school were to be sold at auction. The field was initially taken over by the Defense Plant Corporation, who used the field to store airplanes.

The airfield was turned over to civil control at the end of the war though the War Assets Administration (WAA). Eventually it was discharged to the War Assets Administration (WAA) and became a civil airport.

=== Civil use ===
Today, Thompson–Robbins Airport retains much of its World War II past. The all-way airfield has been replaced by a hard-surfaced runway and taxiway system, however the large wartime parking ramp remains and all five wartime hangars remain and are still in use. Although nearly all wartime buildings have been torn down or removed from the station, the wartime streets and main entrance remain, along with many concrete foundation pads of the wartime buildings. The parade and formation area remain visible, along with the wartime flagpole.

Airline flights (Trans-Texas DC-3s) ended in 1959.

== Major Units Assigned ==
- 2158th Army Air Base Unit
- 59th Flying Training Detachment

== Aircraft Assigned ==
- Boeing PT-17 Stearman
- Fairchild PT-19
- PT-23

== See also ==
- Arkansas World War II Army Airfields
- List of airports in Arkansas
