= Kirk Field =

Airport in Arkansas, United States

- IATA: PGR; ICAO: KPGR; FAA LID: PGR

Summary
- Airport type: Public
- Owner: City of Paragould
- Serves: Paragould, Arkansas
- Elevation AMSL: 290 ft (88 m)
- Coordinates: 36°03′50″N 090°30′33″W

Map
- Location of airport in Arkansas PGR (the United States)

Runways
Direction	Length		Surface
Direction	ft	m	Surface
4/22	4,500	1,372	Asphalt
8/26	2,792	851	Turf

Statistics (2008)
- Aircraft operations: 13,000
- Based aircraft: 30
- Source: Federal Aviation Administration

Kirk Field (IATA: PGR, ICAO: KPGR, FAA LID: PGR) is a city-owned public-use airport located one nautical mile (2 km) northwest of the central business district of Paragould, in Greene County, Arkansas, United States.

This airport is included in the FAA's National Plan of Integrated Airport Systems for 2011–2015, which categorized it as a general aviation facility.

== Facilities and aircraft ==
Kirk Field covers an area of 220 acres (89 ha) at an elevation of 290 feet (88 m) above mean sea level. It has two runways: 4/22 is 4,500 by 75 feet (1,372 x 23 m) with an asphalt surface; 8/26 is 2,792 by 100 feet (851 x 30 m) with a turf surface.

For the 12-month period ending August 31, 2008, the airport had 13,000 aircraft operations, an average of 35 per day: 85% general aviation and 15% air taxi. At that time there were 30 aircraft based at this airport: 90% single-engine, 7% multi-engine and 3% helicopter.

== See also ==
- List of airports in Arkansas
