= Arkansas Highway 78 =

State highway in Arkansas, United States

Highway 78
- Highway 78 in red; Highway 78S in blue in Moro

Route information
- Maintained by ArDOT
- Existed: April 1, 1926–present

Section 1
- Length: 24.03 mi (38.67 km)
- West end: AR 306 near Hunter
- Major intersections: I-40 in Wheatley; US 70 in Wheatley
- East end: US 79 near Moro

Section 2
- Length: 4.30 mi (6.92 km)
- East end: AR 121 in Aubrey
- West end: CR 132 / CR 173 near Aubrey

Location
- Country: United States
- State: Arkansas
- Counties: Woodruff, St. Francis, Lee

Highway system
- Arkansas Highway System; Interstate; US; State; Business; Spurs; Suffixed; Scenic; Heritage
← US 78	→ US 79

Highway 78 (AR 78) is a designation for two state highways in the Arkansas Delta. One route of 24.03 miles (38.67 km) begins at Highway 306 near Hunter and runs southeast to US Highway 79 (US 79). A second route of 4.30 miles (6.92 km) begins at Highway 121 and runs west (Note: Although Arkansas highways normally run from south to north and from west to east, the Lee County Route and Section Map indicates that Highway 78 begins at Highway 121 and ends at a county road intersection.) to a junction with Lee County Route 132 (CR 132) and CR 173. A short spur route in Moro, Highway 78 Spur connects the parent route to Highway 238. All routes are maintained by the Arkansas Department of Transportation (ArDOT).

Both segments of Highway 78 serve the Arkansas Delta, an extremely rural part of the state. Passing through only a few small towns, the highway's setting is a flat agricultural landscape in cultivation crossed by drainage ditches, swamps, and bayous. One of the original Arkansas state highways, Highway 78 was slowly extended in the middle of the 20th century during a period of rapid growth in the Arkansas Highway System. The Aubrey-Big Creek route was created in 1973, marking the last change for the highway designation until the addition of Highway 78 Spur in 2001. The entire route between Hunter and US 79 is designated as an Arkansas Heritage Trail, a route used by John S. Marmaduke's Confederate Missouri cavalry prior to the Battle of Helena during the American Civil War.

== Route description ==
=== Hunter to US 79 ===
The route begins in southeastern Woodruff County at Highway 306 near Hunter. Running south as a section line road, the highway enters St. Francis County, passing through Posey before entering Wheatley. Highway 78 intersects two national east-west routes in Wheatley, Interstate 40 in the north part of the city, and US 70 in the southern portion. Following this intersection, Highway 78 takes a southeasterly turn and angles into Lee County. Entering from the county's sparsely populated northwest corner, Highway 78 passes through Nash Corner before a brief overlap with Highway 259 at South Plains. Now turning due south, Highway 78 enters the small town of Moro. Highway 78 Spur in downtown Moro offers access to Highway 238, leading toward Brinkley. Following this intersection, Highway 78 exits Moro to the southeast, intersecting US 79, where it terminates.

=== Aubrey to Big Creek ===
Highway 78 begins at Highway 121 in Aubrey in southern Lee County. The route runs due west as a section line road until crossing into the riparian zone for Big Creek. Highway 78 crosses McNulty Lake, created by a slow moving portion of Big Creek, on an open deck steel bridge. Shortly after this bridge, the highway terminates at an intersection of gravel county routes.

== History ==
Highway 78 was designated as one of the original state highways on April 1, 1926. Running between US 70 in Wheatley and State Road 3. (Note: State Route 3 was supplanted by US 79 in 1935.), the route remained unchanged for almost 50 years. An extension north to I-40 on February 28, 1968 was part of a program to connect newly built Interstate highways with the US highways they paralleled. On July 29, 1970, the highway was extended by the Arkansas State Highway Commission (ASHC) to the current northern terminus at Highway 306.

A second segment of Highway 78 was created between Aubrey and a county road intersection near Big Creek on March 28, 1973 pursuant to Act 9 of 1973 by the Arkansas General Assembly. The act directed county judges and legislators to designate up to 12 miles (19 km) of county roads as state highways in each county.

== Major intersections ==
County	Location	mi	km	Destinations	Notes
Woodruff		0.00	0.00	AR 306 – Colt, Hunter	Western terminus
St. Francis	Wheatley	9.12	14.68	I-40 – Little Rock, Memphis	
St. Francis	Wheatley	10.85	17.46	US 70 – Brinkley, Forrest City	
Lee	South Plains	19.06– 19.2	30.67– 30.9	AR 259 – Goodwin	(Note: The length of this overlap is not specified by ArDOT beyond 0.1 miles (0.16 km).)
Lee	Moro	22.08	35.53	AR 78S (Main Street)	AR 78S eastern terminus
Lee		24.03	38.67	US 79 – Brinkley, Marianna	Eastern terminus
Lee	Gap in route				
Lee	Aubrey	0.00	0.00	AR 121	Western terminus
Lee		4.30	6.92	CR 132 / CR 173	Eastern terminus
1.000 mi = 1.609 km; 1.000 km = 0.621 mi: Concurrency terminus

== Spur route ==
Main Street
- Location: Moro
- Length: 0.08 mi (130 m)
- Existed: February 21, 2001–present

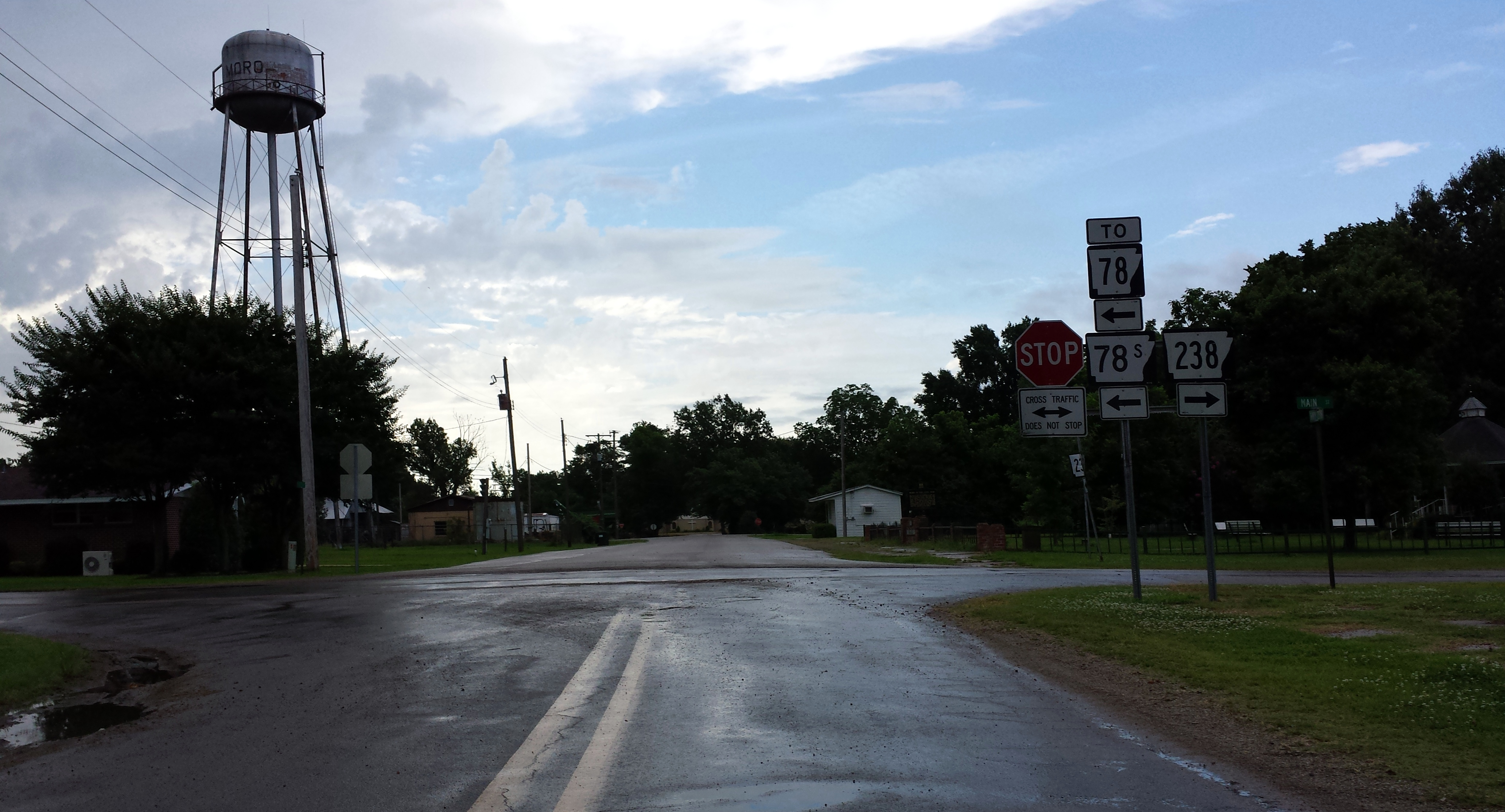
Highway 78 Spur western terminus at Highway 238

Highway 78 Spur (AR 78S, Ark. 78S, and Hwy. 78S) is a spur route of 0.08 miles (0.13 km) in Moro.

Route description
The route begins at Highway 78 in downtown Moro and runs southwest for one block to Highway 238.

History
Formerly under city maintenance, the one block connecting Highway 78 and Highway 238 was added to the state highway network by the ASHC on February 21, 2001.

Major intersections
The entire route is in Moro, Lee County.

mi	km	Destinations	Notes
0.00	0.00	AR 78 (First Street) – Wheatley	Eastern terminus
0.08	0.13	AR 238 (Main Street/Front Street) – Brinkley	Western terminus
1.000 mi = 1.609 km; 1.000 km = 0.621 mi
