= Arkansas Highway 121 =

State highway in Arkansas, United States

Highway 121

Route information
- Maintained by ArDOT

Section 1
- Length: 9.49 mi (15.27 km)
- South end: CR 513 at the St. Francis River
- North end: US 79 / Great River Road near Marianna

Section 2
- Length: 29.92 mi (48.15 km)
- North end: AR 1 near Marianna
- South end: Young Boulevard, LaGrange

Location
- Country: United States
- State: Arkansas
- Counties: Lee

Highway system
- Arkansas Highway System; Interstate; US; State; Business; Spurs; Suffixed; Scenic; Heritage
← AR 120	→ AR 122

Arkansas Highway 121 (AR 121, Hwy. 121) is a designation for two state highways in Lee County, Arkansas. One route of 9.49 miles (15.27 km) runs from the St. Francis River to US Route 79 (US 79) northeast of Marianna. A second routing begins north of Marianna at Highway 1 and runs essentially in a half-loop counterclockwise to LaGrange. (Note: Although Arkansas highways normally run from south to north and from west to east, the Lee County Route and Sections Map indicates that Highway 121 begins north of Marianna and ends in LaGrange.)

== Route description ==
=== St. Francis River to US 79 ===
Highway 121 begins at Lee County Route 513 at the shore of the St. Francis River about 4 miles (6.4 km) west of the Mississippi River. The highway winds northwest through floodplain to terminate at US 79, which is designated as part of the Great River Road.

=== Highway 1 to LaGrange ===
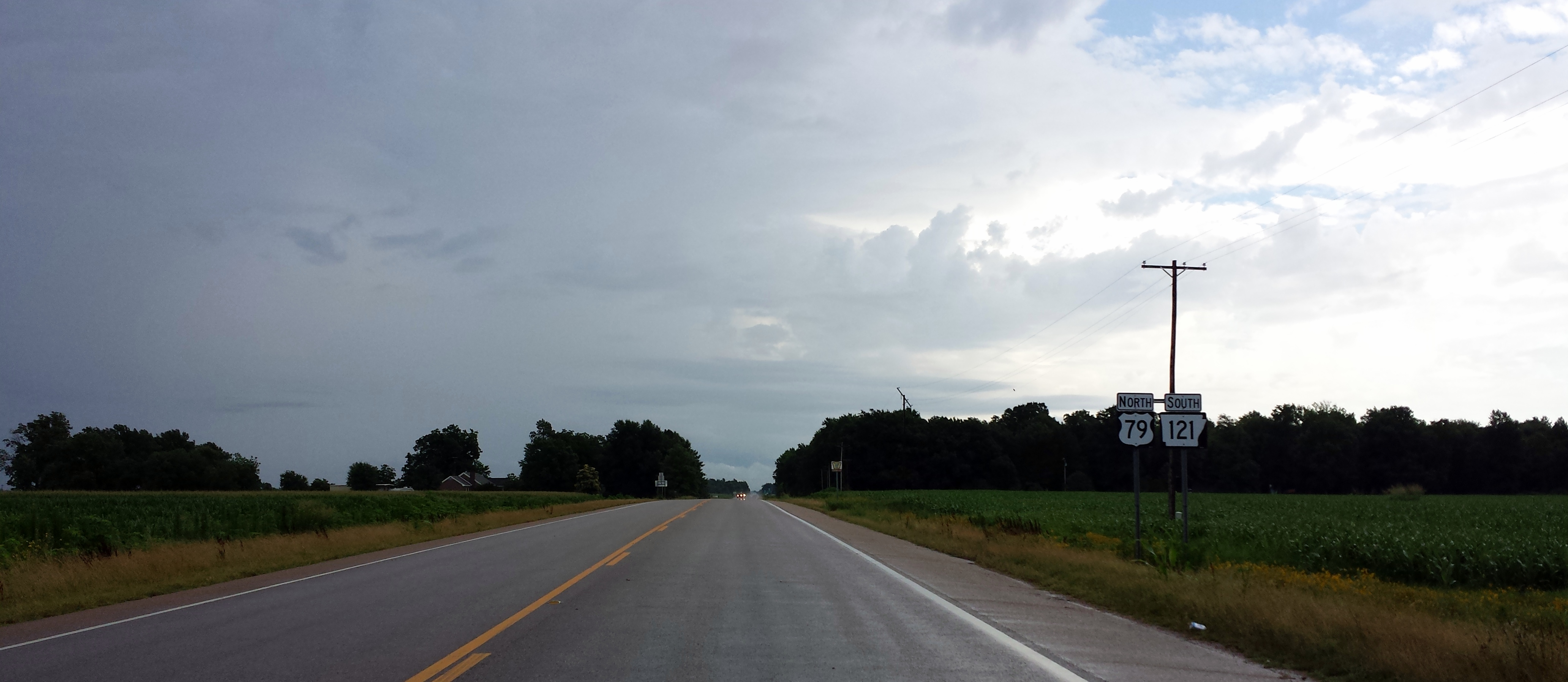
US 79/AR 121 near Moro

The second portion of Highway 121 begins at Highway 1 north of Marianna and runs west through farmland. Highway 121 has a junction with Highway 261 at Holub, after which Highway 121 turns due south. The route continues south to US 79 at Smith Corner when the two routes overlap for approximately 0.5 miles (0.80 km) at which time Highway 121 turns south again.

After running south through a few miles of farmland the route enters Aubrey as Main Street and intersects Highway 78. At Big Creek Corner the route curves east after a junction with Highway 243. Now entering Rondo the route has junction with Highway 243 (Main Street) and serves as the western terminus for Highway 316. The route continues approximately 5 miles (8.0 km) further east to intersect Highway 1 before it terminates at Young Boulevard in LaGrange.

Traffic counts from the Arkansas State Highway and Transportation Department (AHTD) reveal that less than 200 vehicles per day (VPD) used Highway 121 from the St. Francis River to US 79 in 2010. The semi-circular rural portion from Highway 1 to LaGrange varies between 350–950 VPD.

== Major intersections ==
Mile markers reset at concurrencies. The entire route is in Lee County.

Location	mi	km	Destinations	Notes
	0.00	0.00	CR 513	Southern terminus
	9.49	15.27	US 79 / Great River Road	Northern terminus
Gap in route
	0.00	0.00	AR 1 / Crowley's Ridge Pkwy. – Marianna, Walnut Corner, Forrest City	Northern terminus
Holub	7.97	12.83	AR 261 – Palestine	
Smith Corner	12.98– 0.00	20.89– 0.00	US 79 south – Clarendon, Marianna	
Aubrey	4.58	7.37	AR 78 west	
Big Creek Corner	7.37	11.86	AR 243 south – Marvell	
Rondo	11.72	18.86	AR 243 north (Main Street)	
Rondo	11.93	19.20	AR 316 west	
Cypress Corner	14.93	24.03	AR 1 – Walnut Corner, Helena-West Helena, Marianna	
LaGrange	16.94	27.26	CR 210 / CR 215 / CR 233	Southern terminus
1.000 mi = 1.609 km; 1.000 km = 0.621 mi: Concurrency terminus

== See also ==
- List of state highways in Arkansas
