= Arkansas Highway 261 =

State highway in Arkansas, United States

Highway 261

Route information
- Maintained by ArDOT

Section 1
- Length: 15.15 mi (24.38 km)
- South end: AR 259 at South Plains
- North end: I-40 in Palestine

Section 2
- Length: 4.37 mi (7.03 km)
- South end: CR 255 / CR 265 at Horton
- North end: AR 1 in Caldwell

Location
- Country: United States
- State: Arkansas
- Counties: Lee, St. Francis

Highway system
- Arkansas Highway System; Interstate; US; State; Business; Spurs; Suffixed; Scenic; Heritage
| ← AR 260 | → AR 262 |

Highway 261 (AR 261, Ark. 261, and Hwy. 261) is a designation for two state highways in Arkansas. Both are short rural highways in the Arkansas Delta. Created in 1957, the longer segment connects several small communities to Interstate 40 (I-40). The shorter route was created in 1973 between a Horton and Highway 1 in Caldwell. Both segments are maintained by the Arkansas Department of Transportation (ARDOT).

== Route description ==
Both highways are located in the Western Lowlands Pleistocene Valley Trains ecoregion within the Mississippi Alluvial Plain, broad, nearly level, agriculturally-dominated alluvial plain with flat, clayey, poorly-drained soils commonly called the Arkansas Delta in the state. The two routes are separated by approximately 6.7 miles (10.8 km) along St. Francis County Road 255, a paved road.

No segment of Highway 261 has been listed as part of the National Highway System, a network of roads important to the nation's economy, defense, and mobility.

=== South Plains to Palestine ===
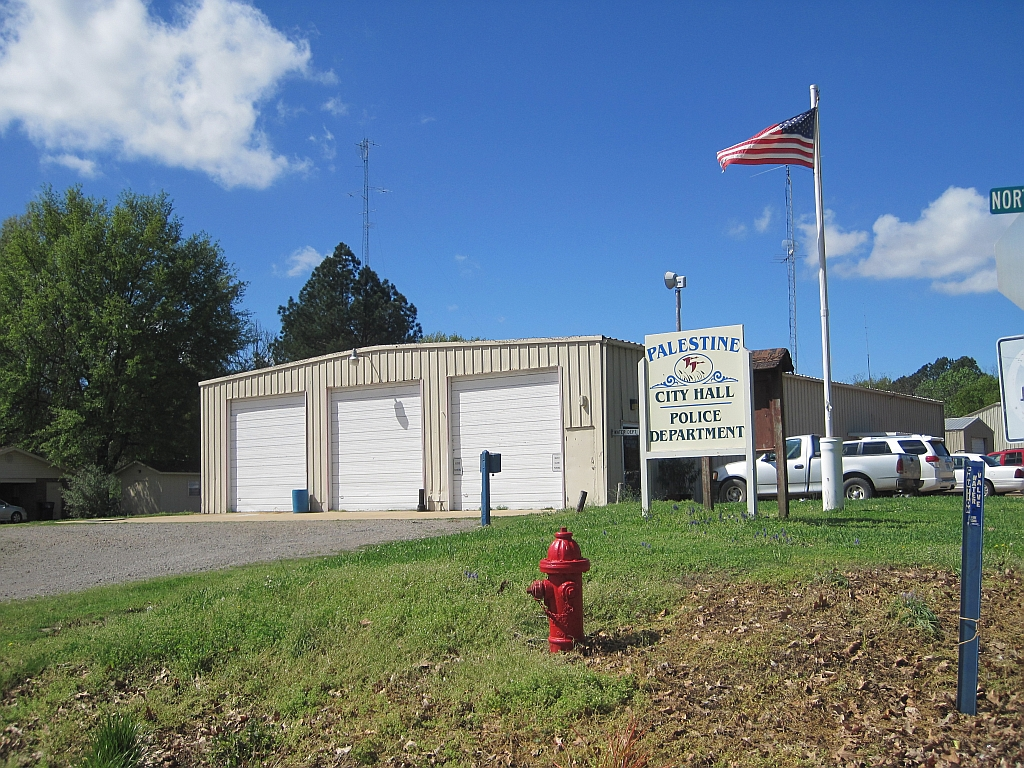
Palestine City Hall is located along Highway 261 near the northern terminus

Highway 261 begins at Highway 259 at South Plains, an unincorporated community in northwest Lee County. The highway runs east across flat fields used for row crops to an intersection with Highway 121 at Holub Crossing. The highway turns north, continuing through sparsely populated agricultural areas, including the unincorporated community Gill, before crossing into St. Francis County.

Highway 261 continues north as a section line road through Humphrey to Palestine, a small city in the Arkansas Delta. The highway intersects US Highway 70 (US 70) near Palestine–Wheatley High School before becoming Parker Avenue and entering a commercial district. The highway parallels the Union Pacific Railway tracks before turning north, becoming Main Street. Along Main Street, the highway passes Palestine City Hall prior to a junction with I-40. Highway 261 ends just north of the last freeway ramp at the northern city limits, with the roadway continuing north as St. Francis County Road 255.

The ARDOT maintains Highway 261 like all other parts of the state highway system. As a part of these responsibilities, the department tracks the volume of traffic using its roads in surveys using a metric called average annual daily traffic (AADT). ARDOT estimates the traffic level for a segment of roadway for any average day of the year in these surveys. As of 2017, AADT was estimated as 240 vehicles per day (VPD) near the southern terminus, 670 VPD north of the Highway 121 intersection, 920 north of the St. Francis County line, and 2,500 in Palestine between I-40 and US 70. For reference, the American Association of State Highway and Transportation Officials (AASHTO), classifies roads with fewer than 400 vehicles per day as a "very low volume local road".

=== Horton to Caldwell ===
State maintenance begins at an intersection with CR 255 / CR 265 in Horton, an unincorporated community in rural St. Francis County. The highway runs due east, crossing the L'Anguille River lowlands and adjacent swamps. The highway continues east through row crop agricultural fields. It turns right toward the small town of Caldwell, crossing the Union Pacific Railway tracks shortly after entering the municipal limits. Just east of this crossing, Highway 261 intersects Highway 1, where it terminates.

In 2016, the AADT was 750 near the route's midpoint.

== Major intersections ==
| County | Location | mi | km | Destinations | Notes |
|---|---|---|---|---|---|
| Lee | South Plains | 0.00 | 0.00 | AR 259 – Moro, New Salem | Southern terminus |
| Lee | Holub | 5.37 | 8.64 | AR 121 – Marianna, Oak Forest | |
| St. Francis | Palestine | 13.72 | 22.08 | US 70 – Brinkley, Forrest City | |
| St. Francis | Palestine | 15.15 | 24.38 | I-40 – Memphis, Little Rock | Northern terminus |
| St. Francis | Gap in route | | | | |
| St. Francis | Horton | 0.00 | 0.00 | CR 255 / CR 265 | Southern terminus |
| St. Francis | Caldwell | 4.37 | 7.03 | AR 1 – Wynne, Forrest City | Northern terminus |
1.000 mi = 1.609 km; 1.000 km = 0.621 mi: Concurrency terminus

== See also ==
- List of state highways in Arkansas
