= Arkansas Highway 1 =

State highway in Arkansas, United States

Highway 1

Route information
- Maintained by ArDOT
- Existed: 1926–present

Section 1
- Length: 30.8 mi (49.6 km)
- South end: US 278 in McGehee
- Major intersections: US 65 / US 165 in McGehee
- North end: US 165 at Back Gate

Section 2
- Length: 34.3 mi (55.2 km)
- South end: US 165 / AR 1B in DeWitt
- North end: US 49 in Marvell

Section 3
- Length: 95.8 mi (154.2 km)
- South end: US 49 / AR 85 at Walnut Corner
- Major intersections: US 79 in Marianna; US 70 in Forrest City; I-40 in Forrest City; US 64 in Wynne; I-555 / US 49 in Jonesboro
- North end: Route BB at the Missouri state line near Piggott

Location
- Country: United States
- State: Arkansas
- Counties: Desha, Arkansas, Monroe, Phillips, Lee, St. Francis, Cross, Poinsett, Craighead, Greene, Clay

Highway system
- Arkansas Highway System; Interstate; US; State; Business; Spurs; Suffixed; Scenic; Heritage
← AR 980	→ AR 2

Arkansas Highway 1 (AR 1) is a designation for three state highways in east Arkansas. One segment of 30.8 miles (49.6 km) runs from U.S. Route 278 (US 278) in McGehee north to US 165 at Back Gate. A second segment of 34.3 miles (55.2 km) runs from US 165 in DeWitt north to US 49 in Marvell. A third segment of 95.8 miles (154.2 km) runs from US 49 at Walnut Corner north to the Missouri state line. One of the original 1926 state highways, Highway 1 has remained very close to its original routing.

== Route description ==
=== McGehee to Back Gate ===
Highway 1 begins at US 278 in downtown McGehee and runs northwest (along the Union Pacific Railroad tracks) for three blocks before turning northeast at an intersection with Highway 159. The route continues across US 65/US 165 and exits town in a northeastern direction, passing McGehee High School. Highway 1 meets Highway 4, which runs south to Arkansas City before curving north to Rohwer, which was a Japanese American internment camp during World War II. Highway 1 passes the Kemp Cotton Gin Historic District, Rowher Relocation Center, and Rohwer Relocation Center Memorial Cemetery. Continuing north, Highway 1 ceases following the railroad at Watson and runs west to US 165 at Back Gate, where it terminates.

=== DeWitt to Marvell ===
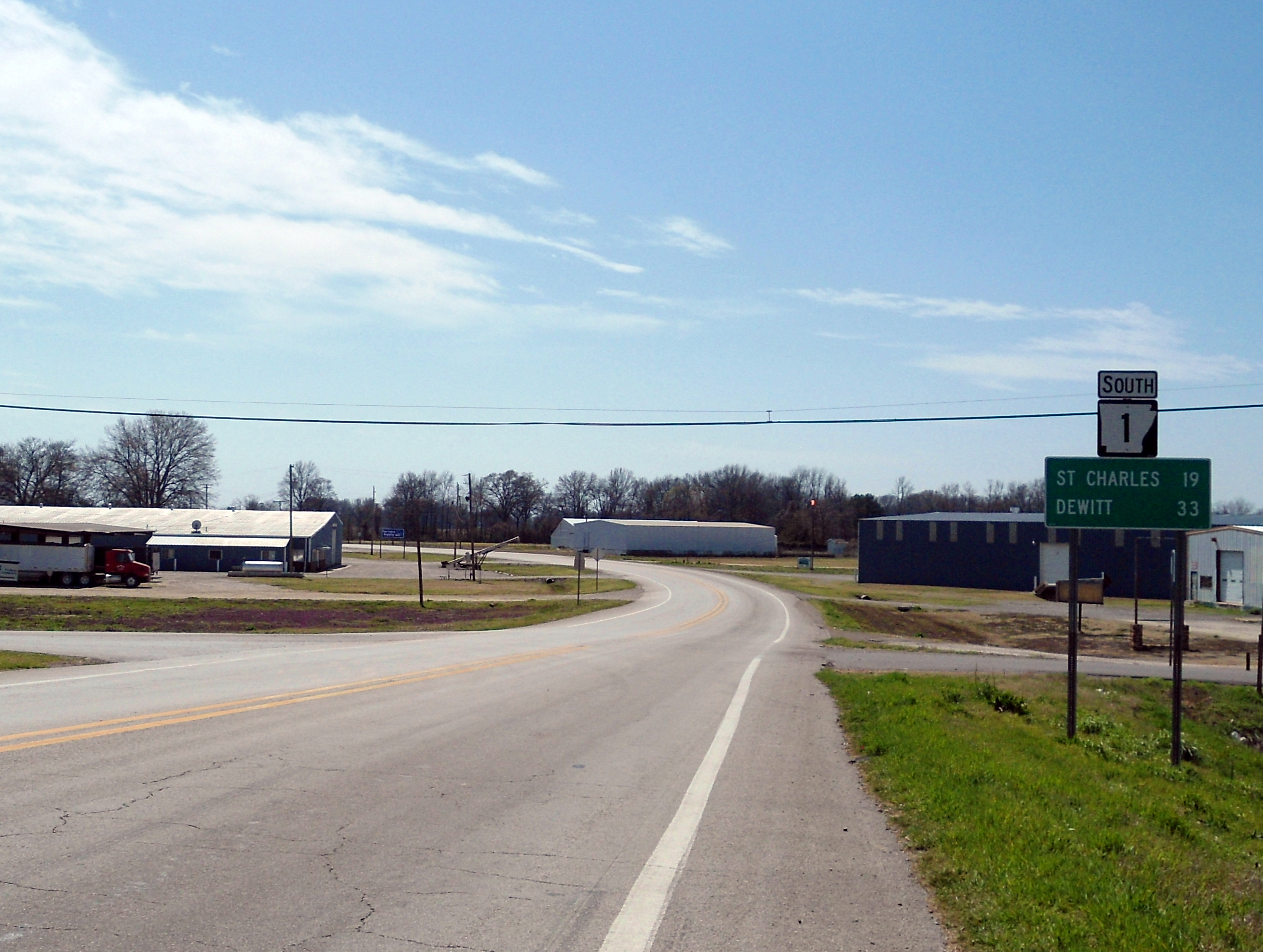
Highway 1 in Marvell, AR

The route begins at US 165 and Highway 1B in DeWitt and runs east. Highway 1 bypasses southeast DeWitt, and after meeting the northern terminus of Highway 1B, continues northeast. The route runs east through St. Charles before entering Monroe County, where it meets Highway 1S. This spur enters St. Charles, and terminates near the site of the Battle of Saint Charles on the White River.

Highway 1 enters southern Monroe County briefly. At Cross Roads, the route is the southern terminus of Highway 17. Highway 1 has a junction with Highway 39 and Highway 316 east of Turner. The route continues northeast to US 49 in Marvell, where it terminates.

=== Walnut Corner to Missouri ===
The route begins at US 49 and Highway 85 at Walnut Corner and runs north. At the corner, Highway 1 turns north past the Richardson-Turner House and enters Lee County. The route has a junction with Highway 121 at Cypress Corner and continues north to Marianna.

In Marianna, Highway 1 breaks west from Highway 1B, which runs downtown through Marianna. After Highway 1B rejoins the main route, there is a 0.2 miles (0.32 km) concurrency north with US 79. Further north, Highway 1 passes Lee County Senior High and becomes four lanes briefly until Forrest City. Upon entering St. Francis County, Highway 1 enters Forrest City. The business route runs downtown, while the main route skirts the southwest edge of town. There is a parclo interchange with US 70 and an interchange with Interstate 40 (I-40). The business route meets Highway 1 in north Forrest City, and Highway 1 enters Caldwell and Colt before entering Cross County. South of Caldwell, Highway 1 is near the historic Little Telico Creek Bridge, listed on the National Register of Historic Places.

Highway 1 enters Wynne in Cross County. The highway has a junction with US 64, Highway 284, Highway 980, and US 64 Business, and also passes near Wynne High School. The highway continues north to Vanndale and Cherry Valley before entering Poinsett County. The route passes through marshes in southern Poinsett County before entering Harrisburg. Throughout the county, Highway 1 is paralleled by Highway 163 approximately 2.5 miles (4.0 km) to the east and US 49 approximately 10 miles (16 km) to the west, with the Union Pacific Railroad also near. Highway 1 passes the Bacon Hotel in south Poinsett County near Whitehall, and also passes the historic Modern News Building in downtown Harrisburg.

Entering Craighead County, Highway 1 enters Jonesboro from the south. After intersecting Highway 163, the route intersects I-555 (concurrent at that freeway portion with US 49). Highway 1 becomes concurrent north with US 49 (and later US 62) until Piggott

The route leaves US 62 (Crowley's Ridge Parkway) in Piggott and runs east to the Missouri state line, where it continues as Supplemental Route BB.

== History ==
Markers for former designations

The route now known as Highway 1 first appears as a state highway in 1924, when the Arkansas General Assembly first created a state highway system. Arkansas State Road B-1 ran from the Louisiana state line near Wilmot north into Missouri, and was mostly unpaved. Upon creation of the U.S. Route system in 1925, the north and south portions of the highway were replaced by US 67 and US 165, respectively, shaping a more familiar Highway 1 routing. Arkansas followed the trend to number in 1926, and B-1 became Arkansas Highway 1. The route remains very true to that original course today. The route was split apart in 1941 into Highway 1 East and Highway 1 West segments from Paragould north. Highway 1 East continued north through Marmaduke and Rector. Highway 1 West traveled into Corning. By 1955, Highway 1W became Highway 135, and Highway 1E became Highway 1. US 49 overlapped Highway 1 from Jonesboro to Piggott in 1978.

== Major intersections ==
Mile markers reset at some concurrencies.

County	Location	mi	km	Destinations	Notes
Desha	McGehee	0.0	0.0	US 278 to US 65 – Arkansas City, Monticello	Southern terminus
Desha	McGehee	0.3	0.48	AR 159 north	Southern terminus of AR 159
Desha	McGehee	0.8	1.3	AR 1Y north to US 65 / US 165	Southern terminus of AR 1Y
Desha		10.0	16.1	AR 4 west	Eastern terminus of AR 4
Desha	Kelso	14.7	23.7	AR 138 west – Winchester	Eastern terminus of AR 138
Desha	Pea Ridge	27.5	44.3	AR 277 south	Northern terminus of AR 277
Desha	Back Gate	30.8	49.6	US 165 – Arkansas Post National Memorial	Northern terminus
Gap in route
Arkansas	DeWitt	0.0	0.0	US 165 – Dumas, Stuttgart	Southern terminus
Arkansas	DeWitt	0.2	0.32	AR 1B north (South Monroe Street) – DeWitt Business District	Southern terminus of AR 1B
Arkansas	DeWitt	2.0	3.2	AR 1B south (East 2nd Street) – DeWitt	Northern terminus of AR 1B
Arkansas		6.0	9.7	AR 153 south to AR 17	Northern terminus of AR 153
Arkansas		10.2	16.4	AR 153 north – Crocketts Bluff	Southern terminus of AR 153
Arkansas	St. Charles	14.2	22.9	AR 17 south – Ethel	Northern terminus of AR 17
Arkansas	St. Charles	15.6	25.1	AR 1S north – St. Charles	Southern terminus of AR 1S
Monroe	Cross Roads	21.5	34.6	AR 17 north – Holly Grove	Southern terminus of AR 17
Monroe		26.2	42.2	AR 39 north / AR 316 east – Turner, Watkins Corner	Southern terminus of AR 39; western terminus of AR 316
Phillips		31.6	50.9	AR 318 south – Cypert	Northern terminus of AR 318
Phillips	Marvell	34.3	55.2	US 49 – Brinkley, Walnut Corner, Helena–West Helena	Northern terminus
Phillips	Gap in route				
Phillips	Walnut Corner	0.0	0.0	US 49 / AR 85 south to AR 44 – Marvell, Helena–West Helena, Delta Cultural Center	Southern terminus; northern terminus of AR 85
Phillips	Lexa Junction	3.1	5.0	AR 242 east – Lexa	Western terminus of AR 242
Lee	Cypress Corner	7.1	11.4	AR 121 south – Rondo, LaGrange	Northern terminus of AR 121
Lee		11.2	18.0	AR 243 south – Rondo	Northern terminus of AR 243
Lee	Marianna	14.0	22.5	AR 1B north – Marianna Business District, Mississippi River State Park	Southern terminus of AR 1B
Lee	Marianna	15.5	24.9	US 79 south / AR 1B south – Pine Bluff, Marianna Business District, Mississippi River State Park	Southern end of US 79 concurrency; southern terminus of AR 1B
Lee	Marianna	0.0	0.0	US 79 north – Hughes	Northern end of US 79 concurrency
Lee		1.8	2.9	AR 243 south	Northern terminus of AR 243
Lee	Felton	2.6	4.2	AR 121 north – Holub	Southern terminus of AR 121
Lee	Haynes			AR 131 north – Lee County WMA	Southern terminus of AR 131
St. Francis		12.7	20.4	AR 1B north – Wynne, Forrest City	Southern terminus of AR 1B
St. Francis	Forrest City	16.5	26.6	US 70 – Forrest City, Palestine	Interchange
St. Francis		18.6	29.9	I-40 – Brinkley, Little Rock, Memphis	Exit 239 on I-40
St. Francis	Forrest City	21.2	34.1	AR 1B south – Forrest City	Northern terminus of AR 1B
St. Francis	Caldwell	22.5	36.2	AR 261 south	Northern terminus of AR 261
St. Francis	Colt	26.5	42.6	AR 306 (Old Military Road)	
Cross	Wilkins	28.8	46.3	AR 350 west to AR 284	Eastern terminus of AR 350
Cross	Wynne	33.1	53.3	AR 284 west (Union Avenue) – Business District, Cross County Museum	Southern end of AR 284 concurrency
Cross	Wynne	33.3	53.6	US 64B east / AR 284 east (Hamilton Avenue) – Village Creek State Park	Northern end of AR 284 concurrency; western terminus of US 64B
Cross	Wynne	33.7	54.2	AR 980 (Bridges Avenue) – Airport	
Cross	Wynne	35.2	56.6	US 64 east – Memphis, West Memphis	Southern end of US 64 concurrency
Cross	Wynne	0.0	0.0	US 64 west / US 64S south – Bald Knob	Northern end of US 64 concurrency; northern terminus of US 64S
Cross	Vanndale	4.3	6.9	AR 1B east / AR 364 – Tilton, Vanndale	Western terminus of AR 1B
Cross	Vanndale	5.1	8.2	AR 1B west – Vanndale	Eastern terminus of AR 1B
Cross	Cherry Valley	11.0	17.7	AR 1B north / AR 42 – Hickory Ridge, Cherry Valley, Arkansas State Veterans Cemetery	Southern terminus of AR 1B
Cross	Cherry Valley	12.0	19.3	AR 1B south – Cherry Valley Business District	Northern terminus of AR 1B
Poinsett		16.4	26.4	AR 214 west – Fisher	Eastern terminus of AR 214
Poinsett	Harrisburg	21.5	34.6	AR 322 west	Eastern terminus of AR 322
Poinsett	Harrisburg	22.7	36.5	AR 14 (Jackson Street) – Newport, Marked Tree, Trumann	
Poinsett		28.7	46.2	AR 158 east	Western terminus of AR 158
Craighead	Jonesboro	37.7	60.7	AR 1B north / AR 163 south (Harrisburg Road) to AR 69	Southern terminus of AR 1B; northern terminus of AR 163
Craighead	Jonesboro	38.0	61.2	AR 163S south (Apt Drive)	Northern terminus of AR 163S
Craighead	Jonesboro	40.1	64.5	I-555 / US 49 south – Hoxie, Memphis	Southern end of US 49 concurrency; exit 42 on I-555
See US 49 (mile 128.40–182.33)
Clay	Piggott			US 62 west – Corning, Piggott Business District US 49 ends	Southern terminus of US 62 concurrency; northern terminus of US 49
Clay				AR 139 south – Holly Island	Northern terminus of AR 139
Clay		0.0	0.0	US 62 east – St. Francis, Sikeston, MO	Northern end of US 62 concurrency
Clay		5.0	8.0	Route BB east to Route B – Holcomb	Continuation into Missouri
1.000 mi = 1.609 km; 1.000 km = 0.621 mi: Concurrency terminus

== Business routes ==
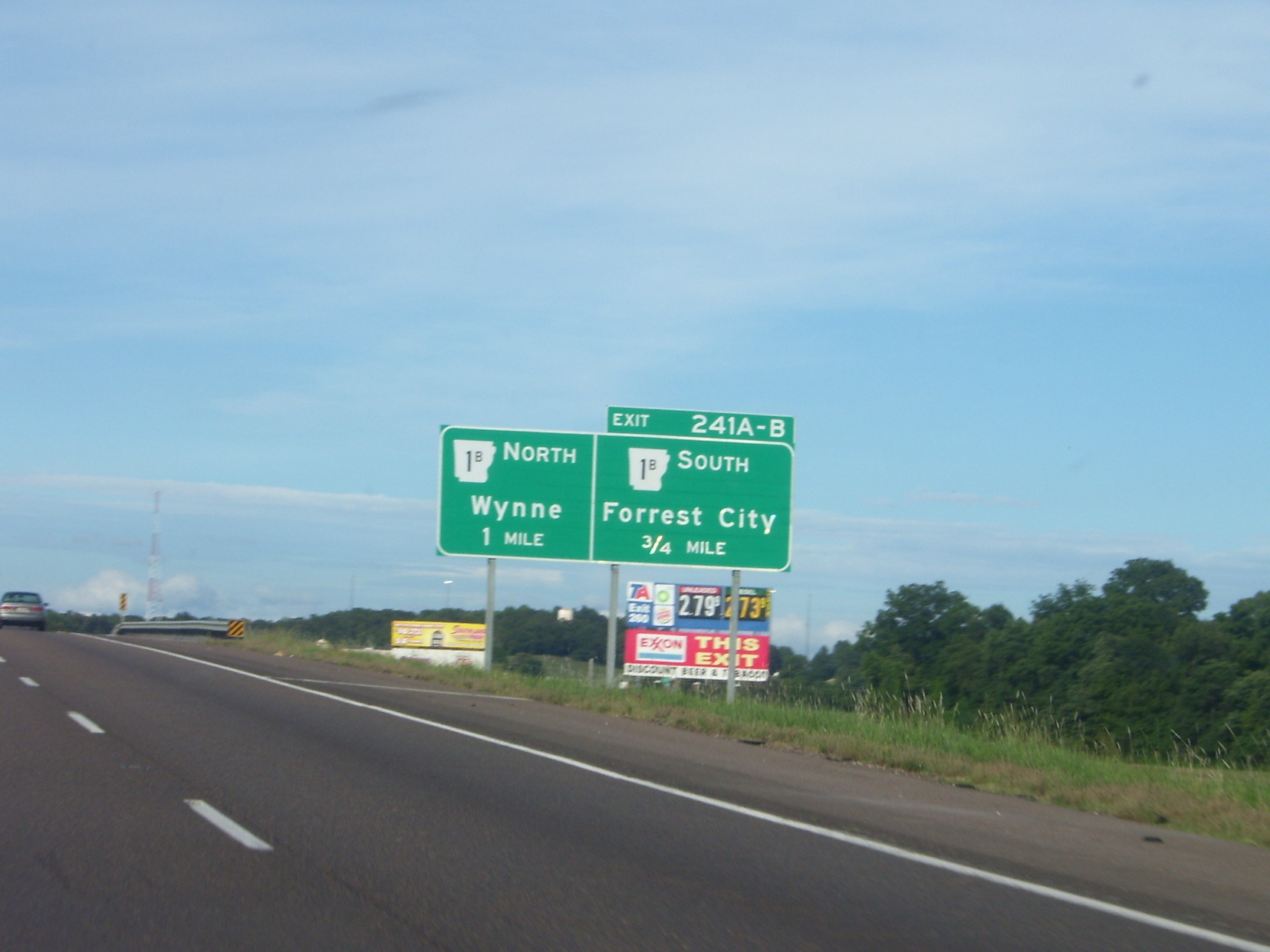
Exit for Highway 1B from I-40 in Forrest City, July 2007

Highway 1 has six business routes and one spur route. As cities have grown, bypasses have become necessary, and the former downtown alignments of Highway 1 have become the business routes discussed here. The St. Charles spur route terminates at the site of the Civil War Battle of Saint Charles upon the White River. The Forrest City business route intersects major routes US 70 and I-40. DeWitt, Marianna, Vanndale, and Cherry Valley all have business routes of less than 3.0 miles (4.8 km). The Jonesboro business route is the longest, and has an interchange with I-555.

A former Paragould connector route, Highway 1Y, was created in 1968 and now carries a designation of US 49Y.

== See also ==
- List of state highways in Arkansas
- List of highways numbered 1
