= Marianna Commercial Historic District =

Historic district in Arkansas, United States

- U.S. National Register of Historic Places
- U.S. Historic district
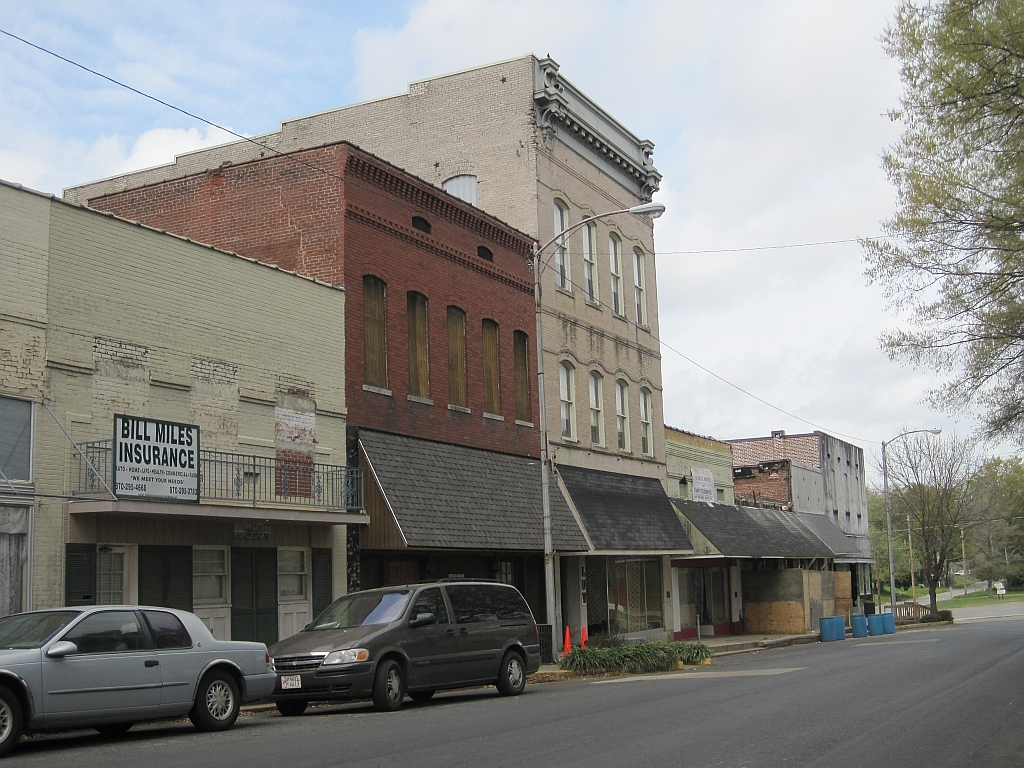

- Location within Arkansas Location within the United States
- Location: Portions of Chestnut, Liberty, East Columbia, Mississippi, Poplar, Main, Court and Church Sts., Marianna, Arkansas
- Coordinates: 34.77353°N 90.75753°W
- Area: 26 acres (11 ha)
- Built: 1884
- Built by: Jennigns and Samuel
- Architect: George Mahan, Everette Woods, Estes Mann
- Architectural style: Gothic Revival, Italianate, et.al.
- NRHP reference No.: 00001559
- Added to NRHP: January 4, 2001

The Marianna Commercial Historic District encompasses the historic civic and commercial heart of Marianna, Arkansas, the county seat of Lee County. It comprises two blocks of Main Street and two blocks of Poplar Street, which cross at the northwest corner of Court Square, a city park where the Gen. Robert E. Lee Monument is found, and extends south to include a few buildings on Liberty Street.

Marianna was founded in 1870, and its economy developed around cotton and lumber delivered to market by the L'Anguille River, a tributary of the Mississippi River. The downtown developed a short distance west of the city's boat landing. Its first brick buildings were built in the 1870s, although the oldest remaining today are from the 1880s, including the elaborate Italianate Hayes & Drake building at 38 South Poplar. Court Square Park, a popular community meeting point, faces the Lee County Courthouse. The district includes 70 buildings, of which 48 are historically significant.

The district was listed on the National Register of Historic Places in 2001.

== See also ==
- National Register of Historic Places listings in Lee County, Arkansas
