= Rondo, Arkansas =

- Town
- Location in Lee County, Arkansas
- Coordinates: 34°39′27″N 90°49′15″W
- Country: United States
- State: Arkansas
- County: Lee

Area
  - Total: 1.01 sq mi (2.61 km^{2})
  - Land: 1.01 sq mi (2.61 km^{2})
  - Water: 0 sq mi (0.00 km^{2})
- Elevation: 213 ft (65 m)

Population (2020)
  - Total: 163
  - Estimate (2025): 148 ▼
  - Density: 161.7/sq mi (62.43/km^{2})
- Time zone: UTC-6 (Central (CST))
  - Summer (DST): UTC-5 (CDT)
- FIPS code: 05-60590
- GNIS feature ID: 2407239

Rondo is a town in Lee County, Arkansas, United States. As of the 2020 census, Rondo had a population of 163.

== Geography ==
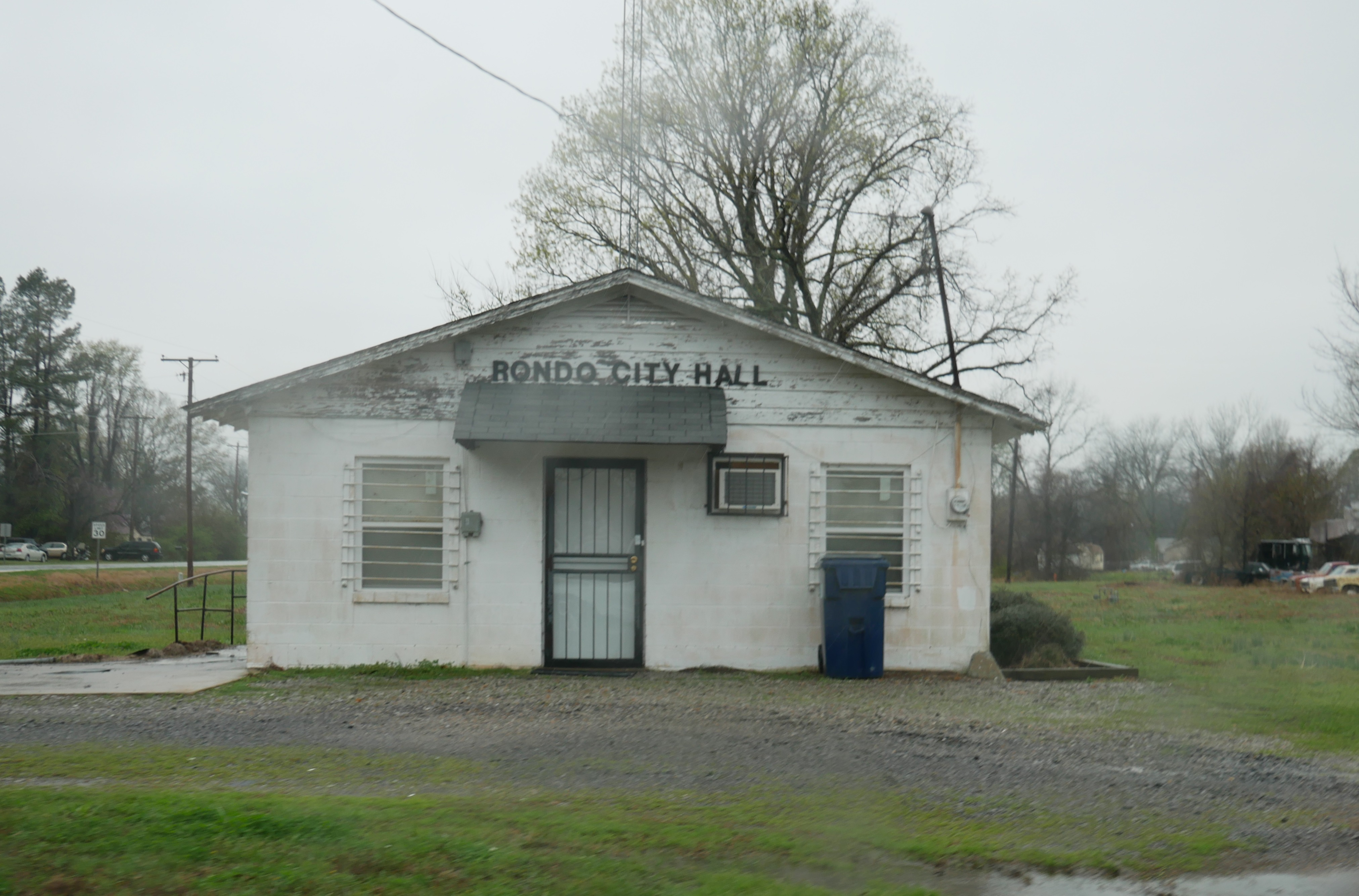
Rondo City Hall building.

Rondo is located in southern Lee County 11 miles (18 km) southwest of Marianna, the county seat, via state highways 1 and 121.

According to the United States Census Bureau, the town has a total area of 1.0 square mile (2.6 km^{2}), all land.

== Demographics ==
Historical population
Census	Pop.	Note	%±
1930	274		—
1940	201		−26.6%
1950	194		−3.5%
1960	219		12.9%
1970	379		73.1%
1980	330		−12.9%
1990	283		−14.2%
2000	237		−16.3%
2010	198		−16.5%
2020	163		−17.7%
2025 (est.)	148	▼	−9.2%
U.S. Decennial Census

=== 2020 census ===
Rondo town, Arkansas – Racial and ethnic composition Note: the US Census treats Hispanic/Latino as an ethnic category. This table excludes Latinos from the racial categories and assigns them to a separate category. Hispanics/Latinos may be of any race.
Race / Ethnicity (NH = Non-Hispanic)	Pop 2000	Pop 2010	Pop 2020	% 20010	% 2010	% 2020
White alone (NH)	59	53	58	24.89%	26.77%	35.58%
Black or African American alone (NH)	166	140	95	70.04%	70.71%	58.28%
Native American or Alaska Native alone (NH)	0	0	0	0.00%	0.00%	0.00%
Asian alone (NH)	0	0	0	0.00%	0.00%	0.00%
Native Hawaiian or Pacific Islander alone (NH)	0	0	0	0.00%	0.00%	0.00%
Other race alone (NH)	0	0	0	0.00%	0.00%	0.00%
Mixed race or Multiracial (NH)	8	4	8	3.38%	2.02%	4.91%
Hispanic or Latino (any race)	4	1	2	1.69%	0.51%	1.23%
Total	237	198	163	100.00%	100.00%	100.00%

As of the census of 2000, there were 237 people, 99 households, and 69 families residing in the town. The population density was 90.6/km^{2} (235.6/mi^{2}). There were 113 housing units at an average density of 43.2/km^{2} (112.4/mi^{2}). The racial makeup of the town was 26.16% White, 70.04% Black or African American, and 3.80% from two or more races. 1.69% of the population were Hispanic or Latino of any race.

There were 99 households, out of which 24.2% had children under the age of 18 living with them, 36.4% were married couples living together, 32.3% had a female householder with no husband present, and 30.3% were non-families. 28.3% of all households were made up of individuals, and 15.2% had someone living alone who was 65 years of age or older. The average household size was 2.39 and the average family size was 2.90.

In the town, the population was spread out, with 25.7% under the age of 18, 6.8% from 18 to 24, 22.4% from 25 to 44, 27.4% from 45 to 64, and 17.7% who were 65 years of age or older. The median age was 42 years. For every 100 females, there were 76.9 males. For every 100 females age 18 and over, there were 69.2 males.

The median income for a household in the town was $15,000, and the median income for a family was $26,250. Males had a median income of $25,000 versus $16,667 for females. The per capita income for the town was $13,601. About 32.7% of families and 38.7% of the population were below the poverty line, including 48.6% of those under the age of eighteen and 46.7% of those 65 or over.

== Education ==
It is in the Lee County School District, based in Marianna. The local high school is Lee High School.

== See also ==
- Old Rondo Cemetery
