= Nettie Johnson =

American riverboat captain (1866–1921)

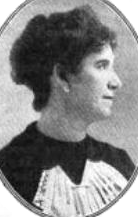
- Born: September 12, 1866; Memphis, Tennessee
- Died: December 30, 1921 (aged 65); Paducah, Kentucky
- Spouse: Isadore Johnson (married 1882-1921)

Nettie Irene Johnson (née Waldran; September 12 1866, – December 30, 1921) was the first woman to hold both a pilot, and a captain's license for steamboats on the southern Mississippi River.

== Early life ==
Johnson was born on September 12, 1866, in Memphis, Tennessee to James Waldran and Melinda Neal. In 1882, she married riverboat captain Isadore Johnson.

== Career ==
Johnson's career started in 1904, when she purchased a share of a packet boat that operated on the Saint Francis River. She received her pilot's license in 1905, after which she built a wooden steamer named after herself. By 1907, she had become a licensed riverboat captain, making her the only woman pilot and captain on the southern Mississippi River.

On January 4, 1912, the Nettie Johnson collided with a block of ice on the L'Anguille River. Johnson and her husband spent hours on the boiler deck calling for help, but to no avail. The boat eventually capsized, causing Johnson and her son to seek refuge in a steel lifeboat, where they were found at daylight. Johnson and her family survived, but two passengers drowned. After this incident, she sold the Nettie Johnson and purchased a steel hull craft called the Grand.

In an unrelated incident in 1913, Johnson took command of the Grand from her husband after he had suffered a heart attack at the wheel. She then traveled with her boat 150 miles to the nearest railway connection, where she sent telegrams to the nearby hospital telling them to prepare the operating room for her husband. Her and the doctors' efforts ultimately saved her husband's life. Doctors told her that had they arrived an hour later, her husband would have died. Johnson eventually sold the Grand after a few seasons, and retired.

== Death and legacy ==
Wishing to return to boating, Johnson purchased the John L. Lowry in 1921, a boat that had burned the year before. After taking it to Paducah, Kentucky for repairs, she was paralyzed following a stroke. Johnson never recovered from her stroke and died on December 30, 1921.

In 1983, Johnson became the first woman inducted to the American Merchant Marine Museum hall of fame.
