= Crockett Brown =

American politician

Crockett Brown was a state legislator in Arkansas. He served in the Arkansas House of Representatives representing Lee County, Arkansas in 1877. He served from the county with Patrick T. Price.

He was noted as a politician in an interview of a former slave.

== See also ==
- African American officeholders from the end of the Civil War until before 1900
