= Haynes, Arkansas =

- Town
- Location in Lee County, Arkansas
- Coordinates: 34°53′27″N 90°47′34″W
- Country: United States
- State: Arkansas
- County: Lee

Area
  - Total: 0.35 sq mi (0.90 km^{2})
  - Land: 0.35 sq mi (0.90 km^{2})
  - Water: 0 sq mi (0.00 km^{2})
- Elevation: 223 ft (68 m)

Population (2020)
  - Total: 122
  - Estimate (2025): 110 ▼
  - Density: 349.5/sq mi (134.96/km^{2})
- Time zone: UTC-6 (Central (CST))
  - Summer (DST): UTC-5 (CDT)
- ZIP code: 72341
- Area code: 870
- FIPS code: 05-30880
- GNIS feature ID: 2405808

Haynes is a town in Lee County, Arkansas, United States. As of the 2020 census, Haynes had a population of 122.

== Geography ==
Haynes is located in northern Lee County. Arkansas Highway 1 passes through the town, leading south 9 miles (14 km) to Marianna, the county seat, and north the same distance to Forrest City.

According to the United States Census Bureau, Haynes has an area of 0.35 square miles (0.90 km^{2}), all land.

== Demographics ==
Historical population
Census	Pop.	Note	%±
1890	255		—
1980	359		—
1990	268		−25.3%
2000	214		−20.1%
2010	150		−29.9%
2020	122		−18.7%
2025 (est.)	110	▼	−9.8%
U.S. Decennial Census

=== 2020 census ===
Haynes, Arkansas – Racial and ethnic composition Note: the US Census treats Hispanic/Latino as an ethnic category. This table excludes Latinos from the racial categories and assigns them to a separate category. Hispanics/Latinos may be of any race.
Race / Ethnicity (NH = Non-Hispanic)	Pop 2000	Pop 2010	Pop 2020	% 2000	% 2010	% 2020
White alone (NH)	32	16	14	14.95%	10.67%	11.48%
Black or African American alone (NH)	182	134	103	85.05%	89.33%	84.43%
Native American or Alaska Native alone (NH)	0	0	0	0.00%	0.00%	0.00%
Asian alone (NH)	0	0	0	0.00%	0.00%	0.00%
Native Hawaiian or Pacific Islander alone (NH)	0	0	0	0.00%	0.00%	0.00%
Other race alone (NH)	0	0	0	0.00%	0.00%	0.00%
Mixed race or Multiracial (NH)	0	0	1	0.00%	0.00%	0.82%
Hispanic or Latino (any race)	0	0	4	0.00%	0.00%	3.28%
Total	214	150	122	100.00%	100.00%	100.00%

As of the census of 2000, there were 214 people, 71 households, and 51 families residing in the town. The population density was 223.3 people/km^{2} (578 people/mi^{2}). There were 74 housing units at an average density of 77.2 units/km^{2} (200 units/mi^{2}). The racial makeup of the town was 14.95% White and 85.05% Black or African American.

There were 71 households, out of which 31.0% had children under the age of 18 living with them, 50.7% were married couples living together, 12.7% had a female householder with no husband present, and 26.8% were non-families. 23.9% of all households were made up of individuals, and 14.1% had someone living alone who was 65 years of age or older. The average household size was 3.01 and the average family size was 3.60.

In the town, the population was spread out, with 36.4% under the age of 18, 4.7% from 18 to 24, 21.5% from 25 to 44, 22.4% from 45 to 64, and 15.0% who were 65 years of age or older. The median age was 36 years. For every 100 females, there were 89.4 males. For every 100 females age 18 and over, there were 97.1 males.

The median income for a household in the town was $19,583, and the median income for a family was $21,250. Males had a median income of $22,188 versus $20,000 for females. The per capita income for the town was $8,057. About 30.0% of families and 42.1% of the population were below the poverty line, including 54.4% of those under the age of eighteen and 50.0% of those 65 or over.

== Education ==
It is in the Lee County School District, based in Marianna. The local high school is Lee High School.

In 1965 the Haynes School District merged into the Marianna School District.
