= Bill Lewellen =

American politician (died 2023)

Roy C. "Bill" Lewellen

Member of the Arkansas Senate
- In office 1990–2000

Personal details
- Born: c. 1952
- Died: 21 March 2023 (aged 70–71) Memphis, Tennessee, U.S.
- Party: Democratic
- Occupation: Lawyer, politician

Roy C. "Bill" Lewellen (c. 1952 – 21 March 2023) was an American politician and lawyer. He was the second African-American to serve in the Arkansas Senate during the 20th century.

Lewellen was one of two African-American lawyers in Lee County, Arkansas, and served as the attorney for the Lake View School District. He lived in Marianna and served as city councillor until 1990, when he was first elected to the Arkansas Senate. He served until 2000, as the second African-American in the state senate during the 20th century.

Lewellen died in Memphis on 21 March 2023, at the age of 71.
