= Patrick Price =

Patrick Price may refer to:

- Patrick T. Price, state legislator in Arkansas in 1877
- Patrick Lucien Price, game designer and editor
- Patrick Price, actor who played Nurse Jeffrey
- Patrick Price (writer), see 14th Lambda Literary Awards
- Patrick Price (born 1994), better known as ACHES, professional Call of Duty player

== See also ==
- Pat Price (disambiguation)
