= Back Gate, Arkansas =

- Unincorporated community
- Back Gate's location in Arkansas Back Gate (the United States)
- Coordinates: 33°55′57″N 91°23′34″W
- Country: United States
- State: Arkansas
- County: Desha
- Township: Silver Lake
- Elevation: 157 ft (48 m)
- Time zone: UTC-6 (Central (CST))
  - Summer (DST): UTC-5 (CDT)
- GNIS feature ID: 45995

Back Gate, Arkansas is an unincorporated community in Desha County, Arkansas, United States. The community is located at the junction of U.S. Route 165 and Arkansas Highway 1.
