= Kokomo, Arkansas =

Coordinates: 34°52′55″N 90°32′58″W

Kokomo is an unincorporated area In Lee County, Arkansas, United States. Its zip code is 72320. On the U.S. Geological Survey Map, Kokomo appears on the Mud Lake map.
