= Patrick T. Price =

American politician

Patrick T. Price (died 1890) was a state legislator in Arkansas. He represented Lee County, Arkansas in the Arkansas House of Representatives in 1877 as a Republican. His fellow Lee County representative was Crockett Brown.

His seat was contested by a Mr Wood, but the house resolved that the Price was entitled to the seat. The report of this in the newspaper refers to him as Patrick L. Price.

He was born between 1845 and 1847 and died in 1890. He was also a reverend.

== See also ==
- African American officeholders from the end of the Civil War until before 1900
