= Elks Club (Marianna, Arkansas) =

- U.S. National Register of Historic Places
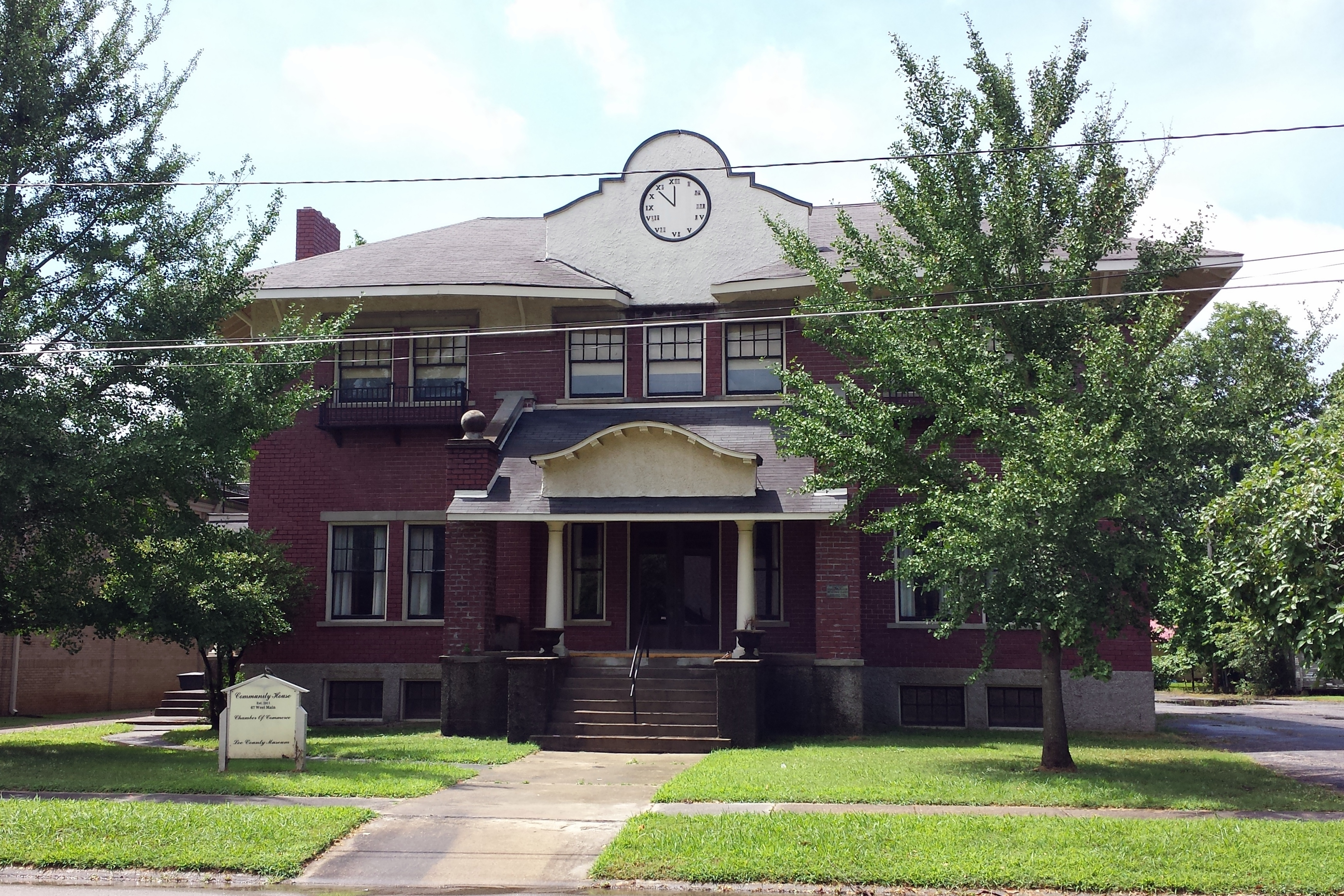

- Location within Arkansas Location within the United States
- Location: 67 W. Main St., Marianna, Arkansas
- Coordinates: 34°46′23″N 90°45′36″W
- Area: less than one acre
- Built: 1911
- Architect: Keedy, S.A.
- NRHP reference No.: 79000445
- Added to NRHP: July 27, 1979

The Elks Club, also known as Community House, is a historic fraternal society clubhouse at 67 West Main Street in Marianna, Arkansas. It is a two-story brick building, built in 1911 by S. A. Keedy, a local contractor.

It has an irregular layout, with a two-story main block and a side single-story wing with a porch on its flat roof. The main entry is centered in the two-story block, sheltered by a porch supported by brick posts and Doric columns. It was built for the local chapter of the Benevolent and Protective Order of Elks, who occupied it until financial constraints force its sale in 1934. It was acquired by the city in exchange for the payment of the outstanding mortgage, and was first occupied by the city library, with its second floor ballroom used as a community function space. The space occupied by the library is now used by the local chamber of commerce.

The building was listed on the National Register of Historic Places in 1979.

== See also ==
- National Register of Historic Places listings in Lee County, Arkansas
