= Lee County School District (Arkansas) =

School district in Arkansas, United States

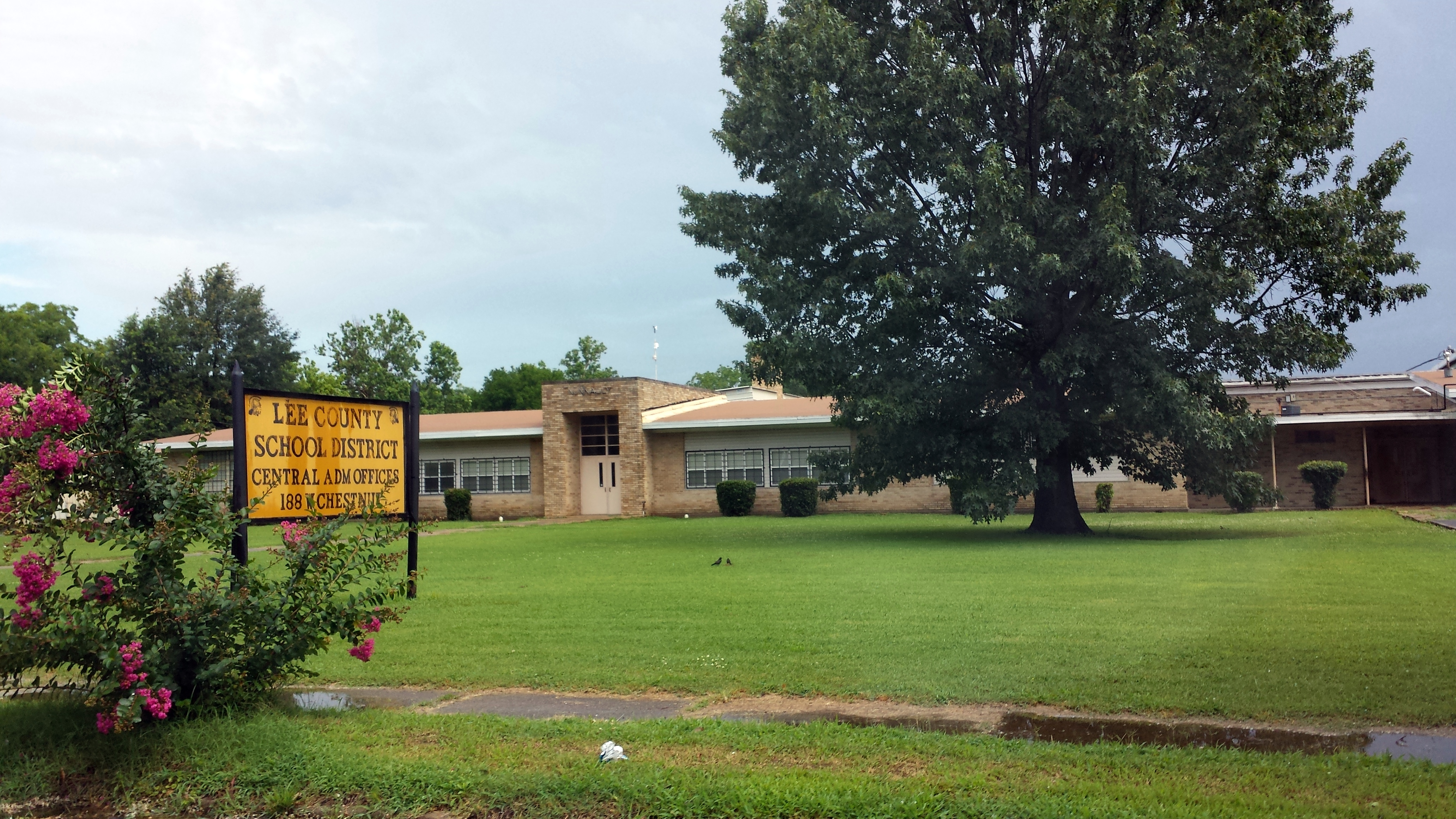

Location
- 188 West Chestnut Street; Marianna, Arkansas 72360 United States

District information
- Grades: PK–12
- Accreditation: ADE
- Schools: 3
- NCES District ID: 0509360

Students and staff
- Students: 1,103
- Teachers: 93.63 (on FTE basis)
- Student–teacher ratio: 11.78

Other information
- Website: www.lcsdtrojans.net

Lee County School District is a public school district based in Marianna, Arkansas, United States. The Lee County School District encompasses 602.62 square miles (1,560.8 km^{2}) of land in Lee County and provides early childhood, elementary and secondary education for more than 1,100 prekindergarten through grade 12 students at its three facilities.

Lee County School District and all of its schools are accredited by the Arkansas Department of Education (ADE).

The district's boundaries are that of Lee County, and include the municipalities of Mariana, Aubrey, Haynes, LaGrange, Moro, and Rondo. It also serves the unincorporated area of Brickeys.

== History ==
In 1965 the Haynes School District merged into the Marianna School District.

In 1967 the Aubrey, Brickeys, and Moro school districts all merged into the Marianna district.

== Schools ==
- Lee High School—grades 9 through 12.
- Anna Strong Middle School—grades 3 through 6.
- Whitten Elementary School—prekindergarten through grade 2.

Anna Strong Middle School is named in honor of Anna Mae Paschal Strong, a native Arkansan, educator and retired principal of Robert R. Moton High School. Mrs. Strong, was a noted African-American teacher and principal who served as president of the Arkansas Teachers Association.
