= Richardson-Turner House =

Historic house in Arkansas, United States

- U.S. National Register of Historic Places
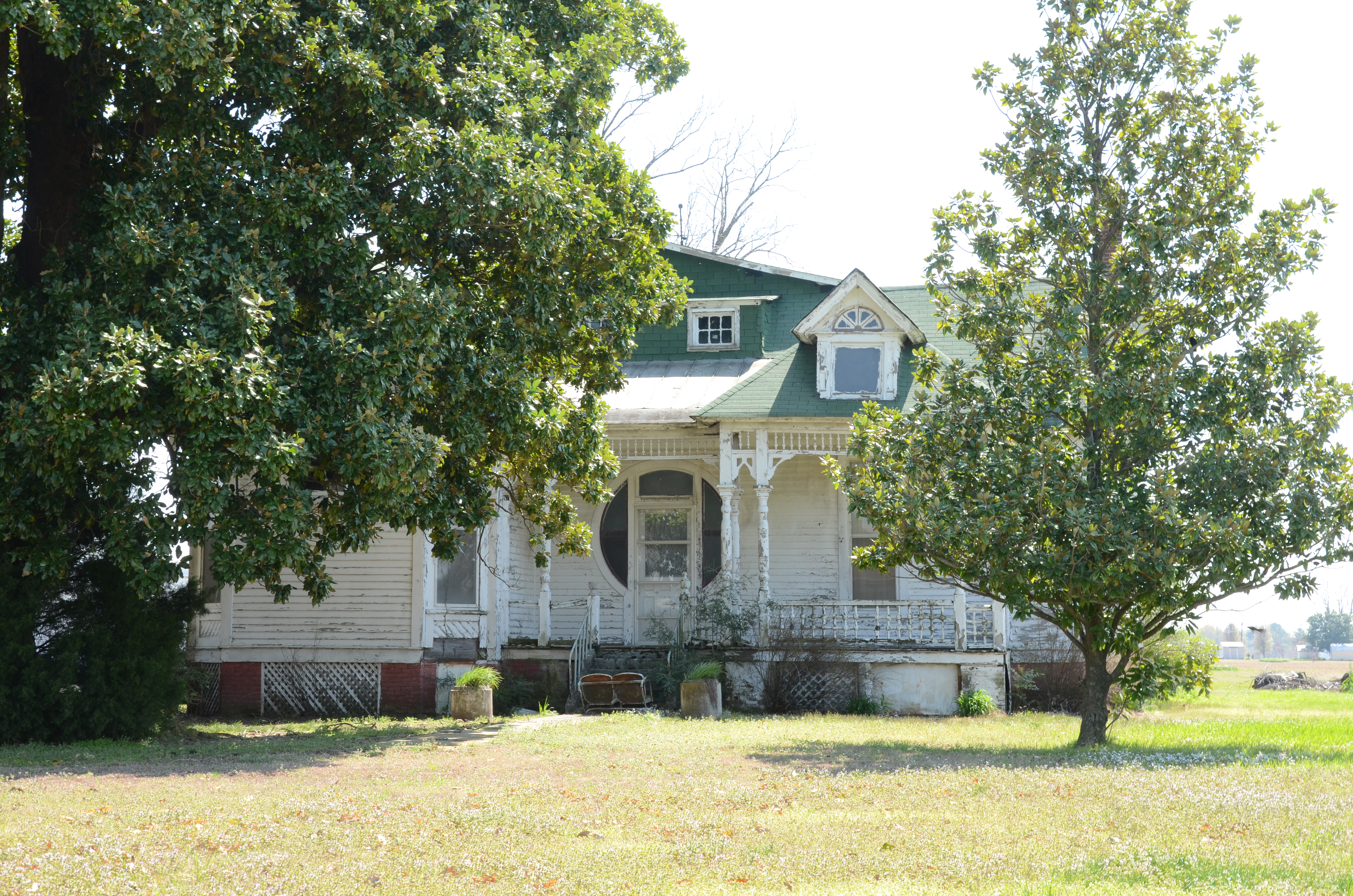

- Location within Arkansas Location within the United States
- Location: 1469 AR 1 N, Lexa, Arkansas
- Coordinates: 34°35′9″N 90°47′17″W
- Area: 3 acres (1.2 ha)
- Built: 1894
- Architectural style: Queen Anne
- NRHP reference No.: 98000583
- Added to NRHP: May 29, 1998

The Richardson-Turner House is a historic house at 1469 Arkansas Highway 1 in Lexa, Arkansas. It is a 1 1/2-story wood-frame structure, built in 1894 by Dr. Willis Moss Richardson. It is one of the most elaborate rural Queen Anne structures in Phillips County, with asymmetric massing, decorative brackets in the eaves, fish-scale shingles on the exterior, and an elaborate porch with a beaded spindlework balustrade and turned columns. The house originally had a tower, but this was removed in the 1930s, and the attic space was enlarged for living space in the 1940s.

The house was listed on the National Register of Historic Places in 1998.

== See also ==
- National Register of Historic Places listings in Phillips County, Arkansas
