= Pat Price =

Pat Price may refer to:

- Pat Price (ice hockey) (born 1955), Canadian ice hockey player
- Pat Price (remote viewer)

== See also ==
- Patrick Price (disambiguation)
