= Aubrey, Arkansas =

- Town
- Location of Aubrey in Lee County, Arkansas.
- Coordinates: 34°43′11″N 90°53′53″W
- Country: United States
- State: Arkansas
- County: Lee

Area
  - Total: 0.33 sq mi (0.86 km^{2})
  - Land: 0.33 sq mi (0.86 km^{2})
  - Water: 0 sq mi (0.00 km^{2})
- Elevation: 203 ft (62 m)

Population (2020)
  - Total: 108
  - Estimate (2025): 98 ▼
  - Density: 325.4/sq mi (125.64/km^{2})
- Time zone: UTC-6 (Central (CST))
  - Summer (DST): UTC-5 (CDT)
- ZIP code: 72311
- Area code: 870
- FIPS code: 05-02680
- GNIS feature ID: 2405183

Aubrey is a town in Lee County, Arkansas, United States. The population was 108 at the 2020 census.

== Geography ==
According to the United States Census Bureau, the town has a total area of 0.9 km^{2} (0.35 sq mi), all land.

== Demographics ==
Historical population
| Census | Pop. | Note | %± |
|---|---|---|---|
| 1970 | 351 | | — |
| 1980 | 267 | | −23.9% |
| 1990 | 204 | | −23.6% |
| 2000 | 221 | | 8.3% |
| 2010 | 170 | | −23.1% |
| 2020 | 108 | | −36.5% |
| 2025 (est.) | 98 | ▼ | −9.3% |
U.S. Decennial Census

As of the census of 2000, there were 221 people, 92 households, and 59 families residing in the town. The population density was 251.0 people/km^{2} (650 people/mi^{2}). There were 103 housing units at an average density of 117.0 units/km^{2} (303 units/mi^{2}). The racial makeup of the town was 67.87% White, 30.32% Black or African American, 1.81% from other races. 4.07% of the population were Hispanic or Latino of any race.

There were 92 households, out of which 26.1% had children under the age of 18 living with them, 54.3% were married couples living together, 10.9% had a female householder with no husband present, and 34.8% were non-families. 32.6% of all households were made up of individuals, and 21.7% had someone living alone who was 65 years of age or older. The average household size was 2.40 and the average family size was 3.12.

In the town, the population was spread out, with 27.1% under the age of 18, 6.3% from 18 to 24, 18.1% from 25 to 44, 24.9% from 45 to 64, and 23.5% who were 65 years of age or older. The median age was 43 years. For every 100 females, there were 63.7 males. For every 100 females age 18 and over, there were 69.5 males.

The median income for a household in the town was $19,167, and the median income for a family was $19,167. Males had a median income of $20,250 versus $16,111 for females. The per capita income for the town was $11,805. About 15.2% of families and 18.0% of the population were below the poverty line, including 21.1% of those under the age of eighteen and 18.8% of those 65 or over.

== Education ==
It is in the Lee County School District, based in Marianna. The local high school is Lee High School.

In 1967 the Aubrey, Brickeys, and Moro school districts all merged into the Marianna district.
