= Moro, Arkansas =

- Town
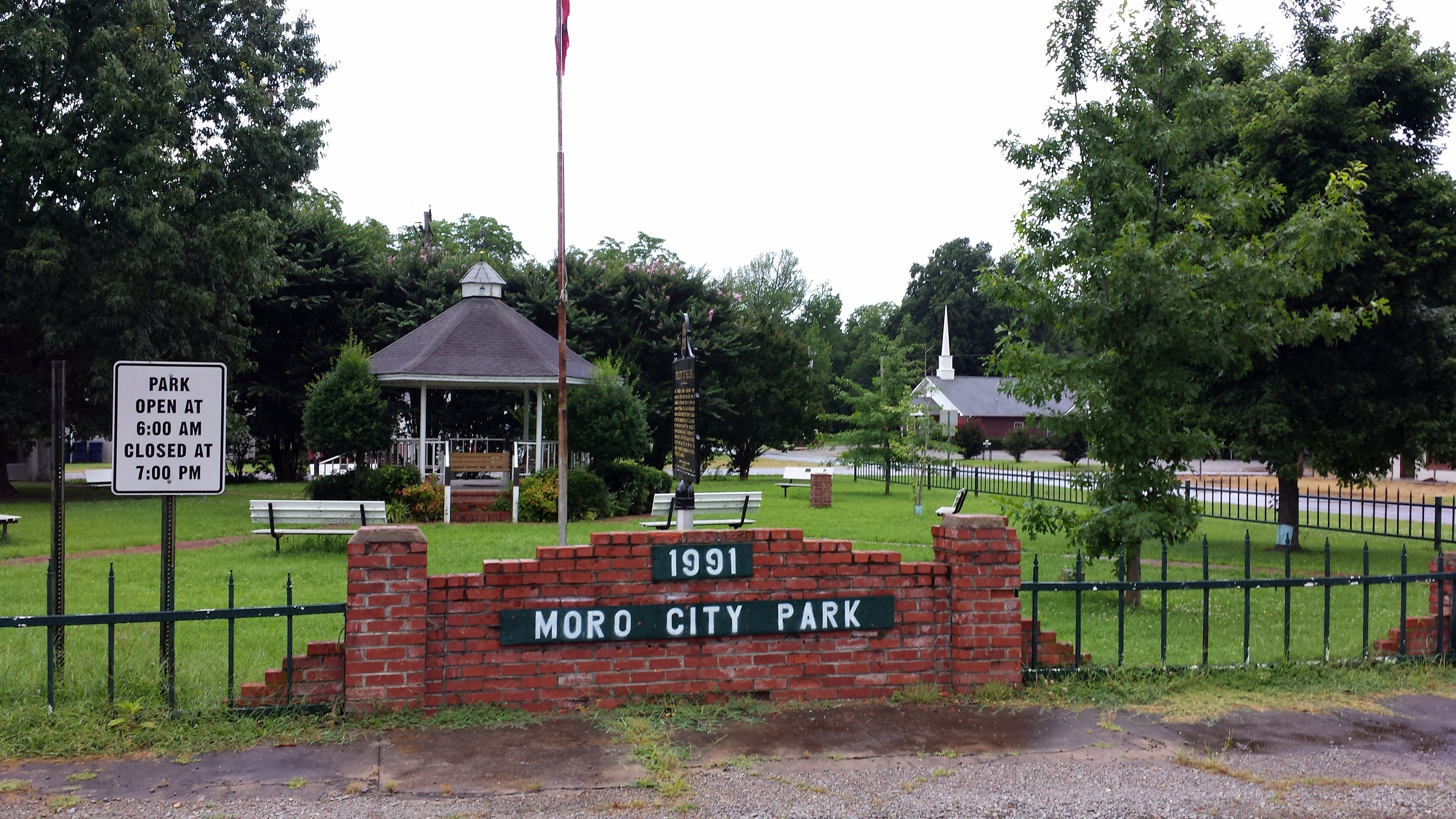
- Moro City Park in downtown Moro

- Location of Moro in Lee County, Arkansas.
- Coordinates: 34°47′31″N 90°59′17″W
- Country: United States
- State: Arkansas
- County: Lee

Area
  - Total: 0.97 sq mi (2.50 km^{2})
  - Land: 0.97 sq mi (2.50 km^{2})
  - Water: 0 sq mi (0.00 km^{2})
- Elevation: 200 ft (61 m)

Population (2020)
  - Total: 177
  - Estimate (2025): 160 ▼
  - Density: 183.4/sq mi (70.83/km^{2})
- Time zone: UTC-6 (Central (CST))
  - Summer (DST): UTC-5 (CDT)
- ZIP code: 72368
- Area code: 870
- FIPS code: 05-46910
- GNIS feature ID: 2406194

Moro is a town in Lee County, Arkansas, United States. As of the 2020 census, Moro had a population of 177.

== Geography ==
According to the United States Census Bureau, the town has a total area of 2.5 km^{2} (0.9 mi^{2}), all land.

== Demographics ==
Historical population
Census	Pop.	Note	%±
1880	51		—
1920	265		—
1930	187		−29.4%
1940	278		48.7%
1950	189		−32.0%
1960	182		−3.7%
1970	489		168.7%
1980	327		−33.1%
1990	287		−12.2%
2000	241		−16.0%
2010	216		−10.4%
2020	177		−18.1%
2025 (est.)	160	▼	−9.6%
U.S. Decennial Census

As of the census of 2010, there were 216 people, 109 households, and 75 families residing in the town. The population density was 97.9/km^{2} (255.0/mi^{2}). There were 115 housing units at an average density of 46.7/km^{2} (121.7/mi^{2}). The racial makeup of the town was 98.34% White and 1.66% Black or African American.

There were 109 households, out of which 22.0% had children under the age of 18 living with them, 59.6% were married couples living together, 10.1% had a female householder with no husband present, and 30.3% were non-families. 29.4% of all households were made up of individuals, and 12.8% had someone living alone who was 65 years of age or older. The average household size was 2.21 and the average family size was 2.72.

In the town, the population was spread out, with 19.9% under the age of 18, 10.4% from 18 to 24, 22.8% from 25 to 44, 28.6% from 45 to 64, and 18.3% who were 65 years of age or older. The median age was 43 years. For every 100 females, there were 102.5 males. For every 100 females age 18 and over, there were 89.2 males.

The median income for a household in the town was $27,857, and the median income for a family was $35,625. Males had a median income of $21,667 versus $21,250 for females. The per capita income for the town was $13,264. About 12.3% of families and 16.5% of the population were below the poverty line, including 10.9% of those under the age of 18 and 22.6% of those 65 or over.

== Education ==
It is in the Lee County School District, based in Marianna. The local high school is Lee High School.

In 1967 the Aubrey, Brickeys, and Moro school districts all merged into the Marianna district.
