= Lee High School (Arkansas) =

Location
- 523 Forrest Avenue; Marianna, Arkansas 72360; United States
- Coordinates: 34°46′57″N 90°46′39″W

Information
- School type: Public comprehensive
- Status: Open
- School district: Lee County School District
- CEEB code: 041550
- NCES School ID: 050936000675
- Principal: Matthew Farr
- Teaching staff: 36.52 (on FTE basis)
- Grades: 9–12
- Enrollment: 340 (2016-17)
- Student to teacher ratio: 9.36
- Education system: ADE Smart Core
- Classes offered: Regular, Advanced Placement (AP)
- Colors: Black and gold
- Athletics: Football, Volleyball, Basketball, Track, Cheer
- Athletics conference: 4A Region 2
- Mascot: Trojan
- Team name: Lee Trojans
- Accreditation: ADE; AdvancED (1924–)
- Feeder schools: Anna Strong Intermediate School (5–8)
- Website: www.lcsdtrojans.net/page/lee-high-school

Lee High School is an accredited comprehensive public high school located in the town of Marianna, Arkansas, United States. The school provides secondary education for students in grades 7 through 12. It is the only public high school in Lee County, Arkansas, and administered by the Lee County School District.

The district serves all of Lee County, including the municipalities of Marianna, Aubrey, Haynes, LaGrange, Moro, and Rondo. It also serves the unincorporated area of Brickeys.

== Academics ==
Lee High School is accredited by the Arkansas Department of Education (ADE) and is a charter member and accredited by AdvancED since 1929. The assumed course of study follows the Smart Core curriculum developed by the ADE. Students complete regular (core and elective) and career focus coursework and exams and may take Advanced Placement (AP) courses and exams with the opportunity to receive college credit.

== Athletics ==
The Lee High School mascot and athletic emblem is the Trojan with black and gold serving as the school colors.

The Lee Trojans compete in interscholastic activities within the 3A Classification via the 3A Region 2 Conference, as administered by the Arkansas Activities Association. The Trojans field teams in football, basketball (boys/girls), cheer, and track and field (boys/girls).
