= LaGrange, Arkansas =

- Town
- Location in Lee County, Arkansas
- Coordinates: 34°39′21″N 90°44′05″W
- Country: United States
- State: Arkansas
- County: Lee

Area
  - Total: 0.15 sq mi (0.39 km^{2})
  - Land: 0.15 sq mi (0.39 km^{2})
  - Water: 0 sq mi (0.00 km^{2})
- Elevation: 210 ft (64 m)

Population (2020)
  - Total: 52
  - Estimate (2025): 45 ▼
  - Density: 343.2/sq mi (132.52/km^{2})
- Time zone: UTC-6 (Central (CST))
  - Summer (DST): UTC-5 (CDT)
- ZIP code: 72352
- Area code: 870
- FIPS code: 05-37720
- GNIS feature ID: 2405967

LaGrange is a town in Lee County, Arkansas, United States. As of the 2020 census, LaGrange had a population of 52. The population was 89 at the 2010 census, down from 122 at the 2000 census.

== Geography ==
LaGrange is located in southern Lee County at the western foot of Crowley's Ridge. It is 9 miles (14 km) south of Marianna, the county seat, and 14 miles (23 km) northwest of Helena.

According to the United States Census Bureau, LaGrange has a total area of 0.15 square miles (0.39 km^{2}), all land.

== Demographics ==
Historical population
Census	Pop.	Note	%±
1880	153		—
1890	216		41.2%
1990	108		—
2000	122		13.0%
2010	89		−27.0%
2020	52		−41.6%
2025 (est.)	45	▼	−13.5%
U.S. Decennial Census

=== 2020 census ===
LaGrange town, Arkansas – Racial and ethnic composition Note: the US Census treats Hispanic/Latino as an ethnic category. This table excludes Latinos from the racial categories and assigns them to a separate category. Hispanics/Latinos may be of any race.
Race / Ethnicity (NH = Non-Hispanic)	Pop 2000	Pop 2010	Pop 2020	% 2000	% 2010	% 2020
White alone (NH)	53	51	21	43.44%	57.30%	40.38%
Black or African American alone (NH)	69	36	17	56.56%	40.45%	32.69%
Native American or Alaska Native alone (NH)	0	0	0	0.00%	0.00%	0.00%
Asian alone (NH)	0	0	0	0.00%	0.00%	0.00%
Native Hawaiian or Pacific Islander alone (NH)	0	0	0	0.00%	0.00%	0.00%
Other Race alone (NH)	0	0	0	0.00%	0.00%	0.00%
Mixed race or Multiracial (NH)	0	2	6	0.00%	2.25%	11.54%
Hispanic or Latino (any race)	0	0	8	0.00%	0.00%	15.38%
Total	122	89	52	100.00%	100.00%	100.00%

As of the census of 2000, there were 122 people, 48 households, and 36 families residing in the town. The population density was 214.1 people/km^{2} (555 people/mi^{2}). There were 55 housing units at an average density of 96.5 units/km^{2} (250 units/mi^{2}). The racial makeup of the town was 43.44% White and 56.56% Black or African American.

There were 48 households, out of which 22.9% had children under the age of 18 living with them, 50.0% were married couples living together, 14.6% had a female householder with no husband present, and 25.0% were non-families. 20.8% of all households were made up of individuals, and 14.6% had someone living alone who was 65 years of age or older. The average household size was 2.54 and the average family size was 2.94.

In the town, the population was spread out, with 22.1% under the age of 18, 11.5% from 18 to 24, 19.7% from 25 to 44, 23.0% from 45 to 64, and 23.8% who were 65 years of age or older. The median age was 43 years. For every 100 females, there were 96.8 males. For every 100 females age 18 and over, there were 93.9 males.

The median income for a household in the town was $22,708, and the median income for a family was $26,250. Males had a median income of $14,688 versus $10,000 for females. The per capita income for the town was $11,516. There were 9.5% of families and 7.6% of the population living below the poverty line, including no under eighteens and 11.3% of those over 64.

== Education ==
It is in the Lee County School District, based in Marianna. The local high school is Lee High School.
