= L'Anguille River =

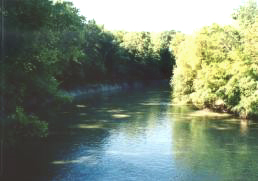
- The L'Anguille River at Palestine, Arkansas

Location
- Country: United States
- State: Arkansas

Physical characteristics
- Source
  - location: Craighead County, Arkansas
  - coordinates: 35°39′33″N 90°43′33″W
  - elevation: 245 ft (75 m)
- Mouth
  - location: St. Francis River
  - coordinates: 34°43′14″N 90°40′14″W
  - elevation: 161 ft (49 m)
- Length: 110 mi (180 km)
- Discharge
  - location: Palestine, Arkansas
  - average: 1,141 cu/ft. per sec.

L'Anguille River (pronounced "lan-GWEEL" "LANG-gill" or locally as "LANE-GEE") is a tributary of the St. Francis River, approximately 110 mi (175 km) long, in northeastern Arkansas in the United States. Via the St. Francis River, it is part of the Mississippi River watershed.

L'Anguille is a name derived from French meaning "the eel".

== Course ==
The L'Anguille is formed south of Jonesboro in southern Craighead County by a confluence of agricultural ditches; several portions of the river's upper course have been straightened and channelized. The river flows generally southward through Poinsett, Cross, St. Francis and Lee Counties, parallel to Crowley's Ridge and past the towns of Palestine and Marianna. It joins the St. Francis River in eastern Lee County, not far above that river's confluence with the Mississippi River. A diversion ditch routes a portion of the St. Francis River's flow to the lowermost course of the L'Anguille.

== See also ==
- List of Arkansas rivers
