= Lee County, Arkansas =

County in Arkansas, United States

- County
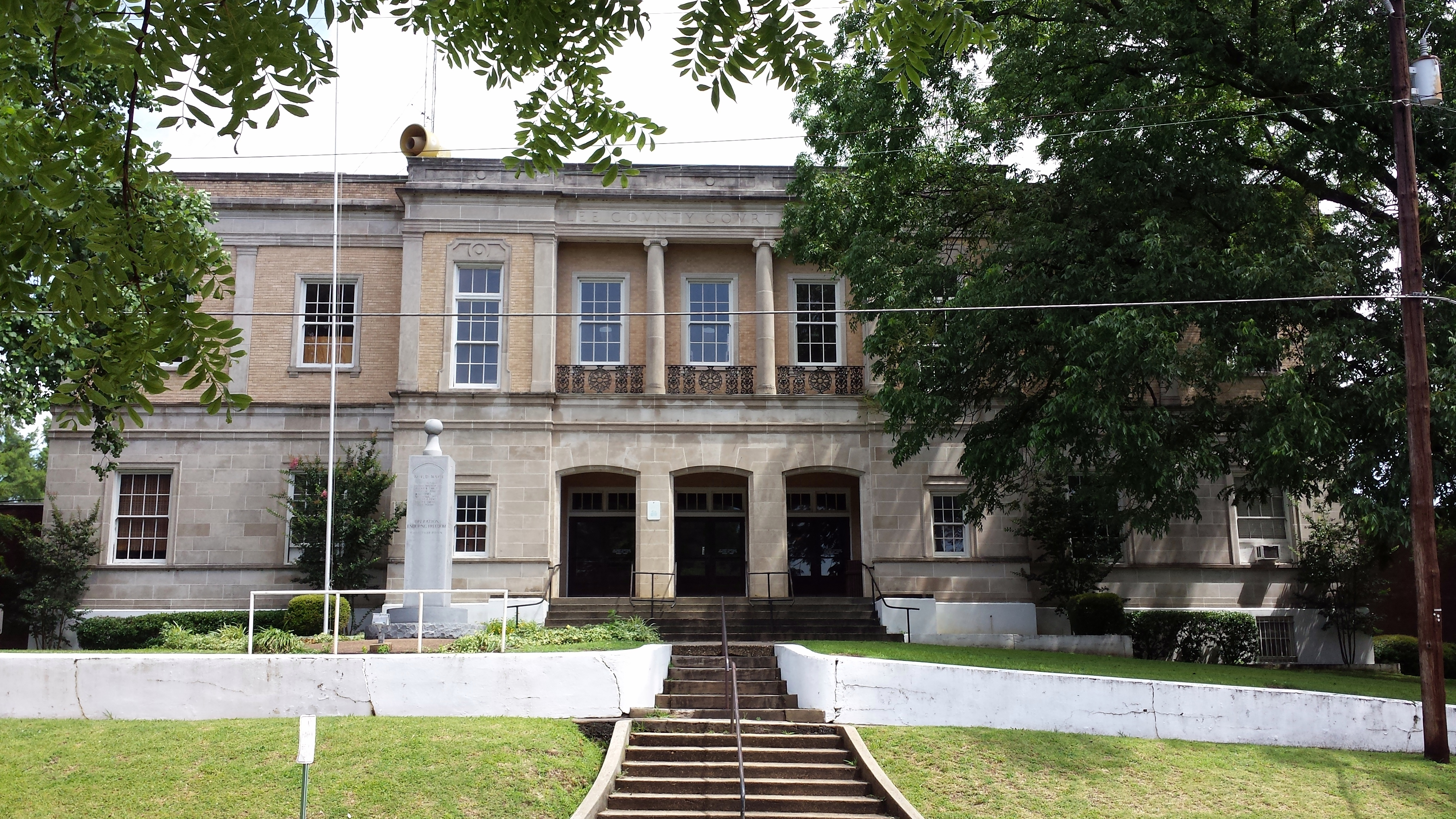
- Main façade of the Lee County Courthouse, 2014

- Location within the U.S. state of Arkansas
- Coordinates: 34°46′32″N 90°46′29″W
- Country: United States
- State: Arkansas
- Founded: April 17, 1873; 153 years ago
- Named for: General Robert E. Lee
- Seat: Marianna
- Largest city: Marianna

Area
  - Total: 620 sq mi (1,600 km^{2})
  - Land: 603 sq mi (1,560 km^{2})
  - Water: 17 sq mi (44 km^{2}) 2.7%

Population (2020)
  - Total: 8,600
  - Estimate (2025): 8,029 ▼
  - Density: 14/sq mi (5.5/km^{2})
- Time zone: UTC−6 (Central)
  - Summer (DST): UTC−5 (CDT)
- Congressional district: 1st
- Website: leecountyar.gov

Lee County is a county located in the U.S. state of Arkansas. With its eastern border formed by the Mississippi River, it is considered to be part of the Arkansas Delta. As of the 2020 census, the population was 8,600. The county seat is Marianna.

The county was established by the state legislature on April 17, 1873, during the Reconstruction era. It was named for General Robert E. Lee, who served as General in Chief of the Armies of the Confederate States during the American Civil War.

== History ==
The area of the Delta was developed largely for cotton as a commodity crop before the Civil War, based on the labor of enslaved African Americans. It continued as an important crop into the 20th century, when it was worked by African-American sharecroppers and tenant farmers. In the post-Reconstruction era, whites struggled to re-establish white supremacy, by violence and intimidation of black Republican Party voters in this area and throughout the South. At the turn of the century, the state legislature passed measures that effectively disenfranchised most blacks for decades. The Equal Justice Initiative reported in 2015 that the county had 15 lynchings of African Americans from 1877 to 1950, most in the decades near the turn of the 20th century. This was the third-highest of any county in the state. To escape the violence and oppression, thousands of African Americans left the state in the Great Migration to northern and western cities, especially after 1940. Mechanization of farming and industrial-scale agriculture have decreased the need for workers. The rural county has continued to lose population because of the lack of work opportunities. There has been a decrease in population every decade since 1940.

== Geography ==
According to the U.S. Census Bureau, the county has a total area of 620 square miles (1,600 km^{2}), of which 603 square miles (1,560 km^{2}) is land and 17 square miles (44 km^{2}) (2.7%) is water.

=== Major highways ===
- U.S. Highway 79
- Highway 1
- Highway 44
- Highway 78
- Highway 121
- Highway 131
- Highway 185
- Highway 238
- Highway 243
- Highway 259
- Highway 261
- Highway 316
- Highway 334

=== Adjacent counties ===
- St. Francis County (north)
- Crittenden County (northeast)
- Tunica County, Mississippi (east)
- Phillips County (south)
- Monroe County (west)

=== National protected area ===
- St. Francis National Forest (part)

== Demographics ==
Historical population
Census	Pop.	Note	%±
1880	13,288		—
1890	18,886		42.1%
1900	19,409		2.8%
1910	24,252		25.0%
1920	28,852		19.0%
1930	26,637		−7.7%
1940	26,810		0.6%
1950	24,322		−9.3%
1960	21,001		−13.7%
1970	18,884		−10.1%
1980	15,539		−17.7%
1990	13,053		−16.0%
2000	12,580		−3.6%
2010	10,424		−17.1%
2020	8,600		−17.5%
2025 (est.)	8,029	▼	−6.6%
U.S. Decennial Census; 1790–1960 1900–1990; 1990–2000 2010

=== Racial and ethnic composition ===
Lee County, Arkansas – Racial and ethnic composition Note: the US Census treats Hispanic/Latino as an ethnic category. This table excludes Latinos from the racial categories and assigns them to a separate category. Hispanics/Latinos may be of any race.
Race / Ethnicity (NH = Non-Hispanic)	Pop 1980	Pop 1990	Pop 2000	Pop 2010	Pop 2020	% 1980	% 1990	% 2000	% 2010	% 2020
White alone (NH)	6,866	5,375	5,074	4,320	3,424	44.19%	41.18%	40.33%	41.44%	39.81%
Black or African American alone (NH)	8,406	7,447	7,142	5,740	4,657	54.10%	57.05%	56.77%	55.07%	54.15%
Native American or Alaska Native alone (NH)	11	11	19	40	18	0.07%	0.08%	0.15%	0.38%	0.21%
Asian alone (NH)	58	46	32	41	13	0.37%	0.35%	0.25%	0.39%	0.15%
Native Hawaiian or Pacific Islander alone (NH)	x	x	0	2	1	x	x	0.00%	0.02%	0.01%
Other race alone (NH)	2	0	1	0	15	0.01%	0.00%	0.01%	0.00%	0.17%
Mixed race or Multiracial (NH)	x	x	36	113	256	x	x	0.29%	1.08%	2.98%
Hispanic or Latino (any race)	196	174	276	168	216	1.26%	1.33%	2.19%	1.61%	2.51%
Total	15,539	13,053	12,580	10,424	8,600	100.00%	100.00%	100.00%	100.00%	100.00%

=== 2020 census ===
As of the 2020 census, the county had a population of 8,600. The median age was 42.6 years. 18.3% of residents were under the age of 18 and 19.6% of residents were 65 years of age or older. For every 100 females there were 127.0 males, and for every 100 females age 18 and over there were 135.7 males age 18 and over.

The racial makeup of the county was 40.3% White, 54.2% Black or African American, 0.5% American Indian and Alaska Native, 0.2% Asian, <0.1% Native Hawaiian and Pacific Islander, 1.4% from some other race, and 3.5% from two or more races. Hispanic or Latino residents of any race comprised 2.5% of the population.

<0.1% of residents lived in urban areas, while 100.0% lived in rural areas.

There were 3,103 households in the county, of which 27.4% had children under the age of 18 living in them. Of all households, 33.4% were married-couple households, 21.5% were households with a male householder and no spouse or partner present, and 40.5% were households with a female householder and no spouse or partner present. About 35.8% of all households were made up of individuals and 17.2% had someone living alone who was 65 years of age or older.

There were 3,695 housing units, of which 16.0% were vacant. Among occupied housing units, 57.3% were owner-occupied and 42.7% were renter-occupied. The homeowner vacancy rate was 1.3% and the rental vacancy rate was 8.4%.

=== 2010 census ===
As of the 2010 United States census, there were 10,424 people living in the county. 55.3% were Black or African American, 42.0% White, 0.5% Native American, 1.6% were Hispanic or Latino (of any race), 0.4% Asian, 0.7% of some other race and 1.2% of two or more races.

=== 2000 census ===
As of the 2000 United States census, there were 12,580 people, 4,182 households, and 2,960 families living in the county. The population density was 21 people per square mile (8.1 people/km^{2}). There were 4,768 housing units at an average density of 8 units per square mile (3.1 units/km^{2}). The racial makeup of the county was 57.24% Black or African American, 41.41% White, 2.19% Hispanic or Latino of any race, 0.27% Asian, 0.16% Native American, 0.52% from other races, and 0.40% from two or more races.

There were 4,182 households, out of which 31.20% had children under the age of 18 living with them, 43.20% were married couples living together, 23.10% had a female householder with no husband present, and 29.20% were non-families. 27.20% of all households were made up of individuals, and 13.80% had someone living alone who was 65 years of age or older. The average household size was 2.59 and the average family size was 3.14.

In the county, the population was spread out, with 26.00% under the age of 18, 10.20% from 18 to 24, 28.70% from 25 to 44, 21.10% from 45 to 64, and 14.00% who were 65 years of age or older. The median age was 35 years. For every 100 females there were 111.40 males. For every 100 females age 18 and over, there were 118.40 males.

The median income for a household in the county was $20,510, and the median income for a family was $25,846. Males had a median income of $26,900 versus $19,505 for females. The per capita income for the county was $10,983. About 24.70% of families and 29.90% of the population were below the poverty line, including 38.80% of those under age 18 and 27.60% of those age 65 or over.

== Government and infrastructure ==
=== Government ===
The county government is a constitutional body granted specific powers by the Constitution of Arkansas and the Arkansas Code. The quorum court is the legislative branch of the county government and controls all spending and revenue collection. Representatives are called justices of the peace and are elected from county districts every even-numbered year. The number of districts in a county vary from nine to fifteen, and district boundaries are drawn by the county election commission. The Lee County Quorum Court has nine members. Presiding over quorum court meetings is the county judge, who serves as the chief executive officer of the county. The county judge is elected at-large and does not vote in quorum court business, although capable of vetoing quorum court decisions.

Lee County, Arkansas Elected countywide officials
Position	Officeholder	Party
County Judge	Terry Sandefer	Democratic
County Clerk	Pam Webb	Democratic
Circuit Clerk	Millie A. Hill	Democratic
Sheriff/Collector	Corey Demond Wilson	Democratic
Treasurer	Mark Smith	Democratic
Assessor	Becky Hogan	Democratic
Coroner	Robert Kennedy	Democratic

The composition of the Quorum Court following the 2024 elections is 7 Democrats and 2 Republicans. Justices of the Peace (members) of the Quorum Court following the elections are:

- District 1: Rusty Crump (D)
- District 2: Junious Pruett (R)
- District 3: Lydia Lewis (D)
- District 4: Jed S. Anderson (D)
- District 5: Ronni Schwantz (R)
- District 6: Tracia Tinzie (D)
- District 7: West Higginbothom (D)
- District 8: Bill Gerrard (D)
- District 9: Jesse C. Garrett (D)

Additionally, the townships of Lee County are entitled to elect their own respective constables, as set forth by the Constitution of Arkansas. Constables are largely of historical significance as they were used to keep the peace in rural areas when travel was more difficult. The township constables as of the 2024 elections are:

- District 1: James Stacks (D)
- District 2: Payton Stegall (R)
- District 3: Carl E. Bledsoe Sr. (D)
- District 5: Thomas Webb III (D)
- District 6: Mike Middleton (D)
- District 7: Adrian D. Smith (D)
- District 8: Timothy Turley (D)

=== Infrastructure ===
The East Arkansas Regional Unit of the Arkansas Department of Correction is in Lee County.

The Lee County Courthouse in located in the town of Marianna, which is the county seat.

=== Politics ===
Since World War II, Lee County has voted for the Democratic presidential candidate in all but two elections: 1948, when it voted for third-party Strom Thurmond rather than for Harry Truman, and in 1972, when formerly Democratic voters crossed party lines and voted for Republican Richard Nixon. The former comes with the caveat that Black people could not vote in the South in 1948, and the latter was the last year that white conservatives dominated county politics. Following passage and enforcement of the Voting Rights Act of 1965, newly registered African Americans began to support Democratic Party candidates. They have largely maintained this affiliation. Most whites have shifted into the Republican Party since the 1970s, and major population loss combined with the state's hard right turn has made the county tightly close in recent elections. Despite being a Democratic stronghold, in 2020 Donald Trump became the first Republican since 1972 (and only the second overall) to come within 5% of winning the county.

United States presidential election results for Lee County, Arkansas
Year	Republican		Democratic		Third party(ies)	
Year	No.	%	No.	%	No.	%
1896	213	9.68%	1,946	88.41%	42	1.91%
1900	1,296	31.26%	2,850	68.74%	0	0.00%
1904	1,569	48.26%	1,682	51.74%	0	0.00%
1908	354	22.56%	1,182	75.33%	33	2.10%
1912	665	36.10%	968	52.55%	209	11.35%
1916	353	29.39%	848	70.61%	0	0.00%
1920	354	23.60%	1,108	73.87%	38	2.53%
1924	596	35.00%	1,103	64.77%	4	0.23%
1928	149	12.47%	1,046	87.53%	0	0.00%
1932	39	2.32%	1,635	97.44%	4	0.24%
1936	66	4.98%	1,257	94.87%	2	0.15%
1940	109	8.99%	1,100	90.76%	3	0.25%
1944	275	19.70%	1,118	80.09%	3	0.21%
1948	95	6.37%	528	35.41%	868	58.22%
1952	1,054	35.27%	1,923	64.36%	11	0.37%
1956	974	34.61%	1,719	61.09%	121	4.30%
1960	1,034	38.28%	1,409	52.17%	258	9.55%
1964	1,668	41.59%	2,335	58.21%	8	0.20%
1968	834	17.10%	2,135	43.79%	1,907	39.11%
1972	3,540	64.59%	1,907	34.79%	34	0.62%
1976	1,574	31.24%	3,463	68.74%	1	0.02%
1980	1,711	35.09%	3,103	63.64%	62	1.27%
1984	2,101	44.54%	2,541	53.87%	75	1.59%
1988	1,863	38.72%	2,878	59.81%	71	1.48%
1992	1,293	25.52%	3,436	67.82%	337	6.65%
1996	1,013	22.25%	3,267	71.75%	273	6.00%
2000	1,351	32.78%	2,727	66.17%	43	1.04%
2004	1,492	36.57%	2,548	62.45%	40	0.98%
2008	1,454	38.64%	2,263	60.14%	46	1.22%
2012	1,280	37.38%	2,107	61.54%	37	1.08%
2016	1,229	40.61%	1,735	57.34%	62	2.05%
2020	1,286	45.15%	1,423	49.96%	139	4.88%
2024	1,181	46.87%	1,270	50.40%	69	2.74%

== Communities ==
=== Towns ===
- Marianna (county seat)
- Aubrey
- Haynes
- LaGrange
- Moro
- Rondo

=== Unincorporated communities ===
- Kokomo, Arkansas
- Brickeys, Arkansas
- Midway, Arkansas
- Monroe, Arkansas

=== Townships ===
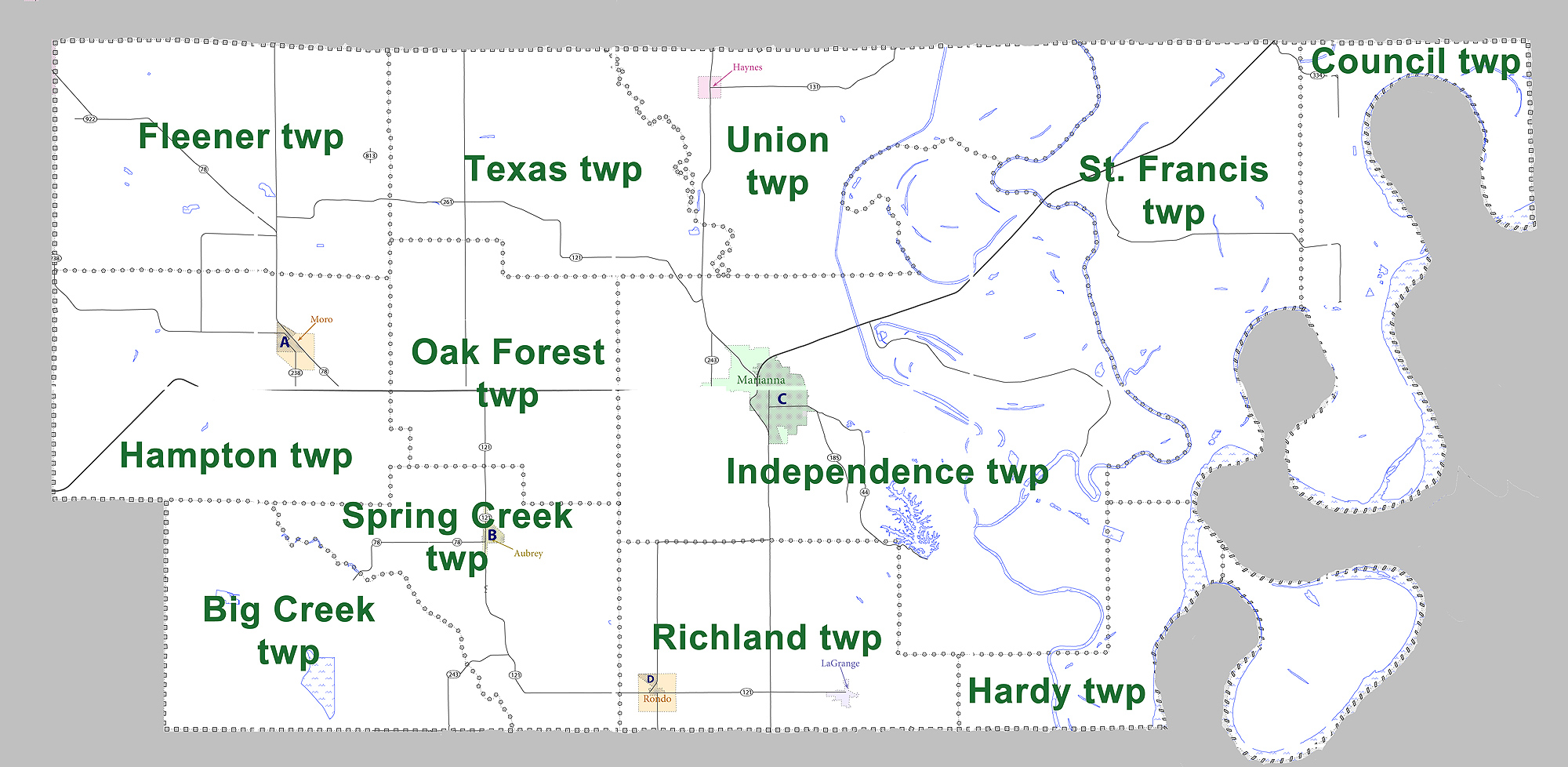
Townships in Lee County, Arkansas as of 2010

Townships in Arkansas are the divisions of a county. Each township includes unincorporated areas; some may have incorporated cities or towns within part of their boundaries. Arkansas townships have limited purposes in modern times. However, the United States census does list Arkansas population based on townships (sometimes referred to as "county subdivisions" or "minor civil divisions"). Townships are also of value for historical purposes in terms of genealogical research. Each town or city is within one or more townships in an Arkansas county based on census maps and publications. The townships of Lee County are listed below; listed in parentheses are the cities, towns, and/or census-designated places that are fully or partially inside the township.

- Big Creek
- Council
- Fleener
- Hampton (Moro)
- Hardy
- Independence (Marianna)
- Oak Forest
- Richland (LaGrange, Rondo)
- St. Francis
- Spring Creek (Aubrey)
- Texas
- Union (Haynes)

== Education ==
There is one school district in the county, Lee County School District. Its boundaries are that of the county. The sole high school in the county is Lee High School.

== See also ==
- Jones Bar-B-Q Diner, Arkansas' only James Beard Award-winning restaurant
- List of counties in Arkansas
- List of lakes in Lee County, Arkansas
- List of memorials to Robert E. Lee
- National Register of Historic Places listings in Lee County, Arkansas
