= Marianna, Arkansas =

- Town
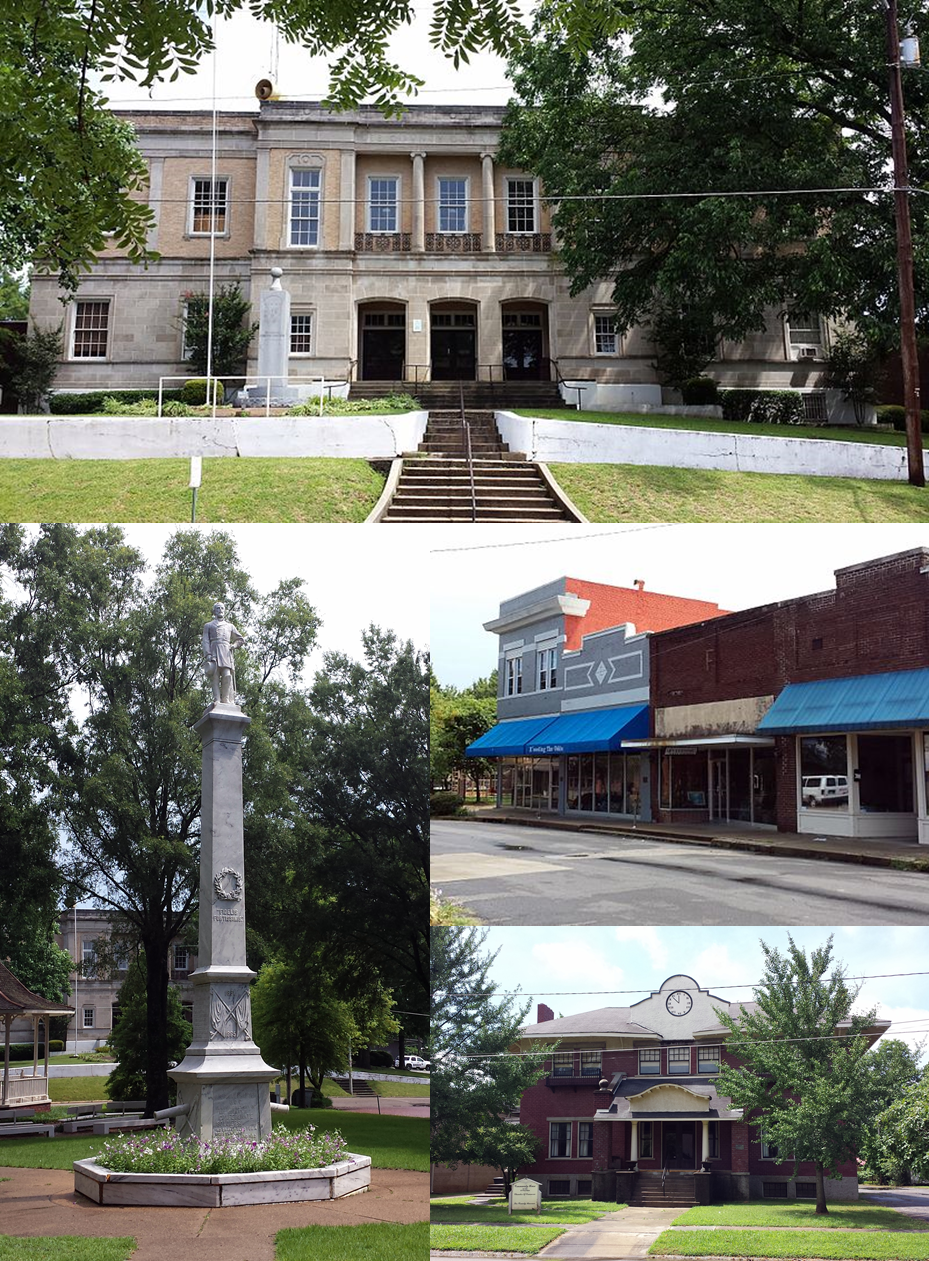
- Clockwise, from top: Lee County Courthouse, Marianna Commercial Historic District, Lee County Historical Museum, and the General Robert E. Lee Monument in City Park

- Location in Lee County, Arkansas
- Coordinates: 34°46′25″N 90°45′27″W
- Country: United States
- State: Arkansas
- County: Lee

Area
  - Total: 3.61 sq mi (9.36 km^{2})
  - Land: 3.61 sq mi (9.36 km^{2})
  - Water: 0 sq mi (0.00 km^{2})
- Elevation: 230 ft (70 m)

Population (2020)
  - Total: 3,575
  - Estimate (2025): 3,253 ▼
  - Density: 989/sq mi (381.9/km^{2})
- Time zone: UTC-6 (Central (CST))
  - Summer (DST): UTC-5 (CDT)
- ZIP code: 72360
- Area code: 870
- FIPS code: 05-44120
- GNIS feature ID: 2405017

Marianna is a town in and the county seat of Lee County, Arkansas, United States. As of the 2020 census it had a population of 3,575, down from 4,115 at the 2010 census.

Located along the L'Anguille River in the Arkansas Delta just north of the St. Francis National Forest, the community was known as "Walnut Ridge" until 1852 when it became known as "Marianna". The town's economy has historically been based on agriculture, especially cotton production. The town is located along Crowley's Ridge Parkway and the Great River Road, both National Scenic Byways showcasing Crowley's Ridge and the Mississippi River.

== History ==
The community was established by Col. Walter H. Otey in 1848, and was known as Walnut Ridge until 1852.

Marianna hosted minor league baseball. In 1909, the Marianna Brickeys team played as members of the Class D level Northeast Arkansas League, finishing in third place in their only season of minor league play. The Marianna use of the "Brickeys" nickname corresponded to the city bricking the city streets in 1908.

== Geography ==
Marianna is located in the center of the county at the northwest tip of St. Francis National Forest. U.S. Route 79 passes through the north and west sides of the town, leading northeast 58 miles (93 km) to Memphis, Tennessee, and southwest 90 miles (140 km) to Pine Bluff. Arkansas Highway 1 passes through the west side of the town, leading north 18 miles (29 km) to Forrest City and south 16 miles (26 km) to Barton.

The town lies along the west side of the L'Anguille River two miles west of that stream's confluence with the St. Francis River within a break in elevation of Crowley's Ridge.

According to the United States Census Bureau, the town has a total area of 3.61 square miles (9.36 km^{2}), all land. The town's current mayor is Jimmy Williams, who took office on January 1, 2011.

== Climate ==
According to the Köppen Climate Classification system, Marianna has a humid subtropical climate, abbreviated "Cfa" on climate maps. The hottest temperature recorded in Marianna was 109 °F (42.8 °C) on July 24, 1918, while the coldest temperature recorded was −11 °F (−23.9 °C) on January 12, 1918.

Climate data for Marianna, Arkansas, 1991–2020 normals, extremes 1899–present
Month	Jan	Feb	Mar	Apr	May	Jun	Jul	Aug	Sep	Oct	Nov	Dec	Year
Record high °F (°C)	80 (27)	84 (29)	88 (31)	94 (34)	98 (37)	107 (42)	109 (43)	108 (42)	106 (41)	96 (36)	87 (31)	79 (26)	109 (43)
Mean maximum °F (°C)	68.6 (20.3)	72.2 (22.3)	78.7 (25.9)	84.6 (29.2)	90.3 (32.4)	94.9 (34.9)	97.5 (36.4)	97.1 (36.2)	94.5 (34.7)	88.4 (31.3)	78.3 (25.7)	69.5 (20.8)	99.1 (37.3)
Mean daily maximum °F (°C)	49.0 (9.4)	53.8 (12.1)	62.6 (17.0)	72.4 (22.4)	81.1 (27.3)	88.4 (31.3)	90.8 (32.7)	90.6 (32.6)	85.4 (29.7)	74.7 (23.7)	61.7 (16.5)	52.0 (11.1)	71.9 (22.1)
Daily mean °F (°C)	40.5 (4.7)	44.6 (7.0)	52.8 (11.6)	62.1 (16.7)	71.3 (21.8)	78.8 (26.0)	81.2 (27.3)	80.3 (26.8)	74.3 (23.5)	63.3 (17.4)	51.9 (11.1)	43.6 (6.4)	62.1 (16.7)
Mean daily minimum °F (°C)	32.0 (0.0)	35.3 (1.8)	43.0 (6.1)	51.9 (11.1)	61.5 (16.4)	69.2 (20.7)	71.6 (22.0)	70.0 (21.1)	63.3 (17.4)	52.0 (11.1)	42.2 (5.7)	35.3 (1.8)	52.3 (11.3)
Mean minimum °F (°C)	15.4 (−9.2)	19.8 (−6.8)	25.2 (−3.8)	35.8 (2.1)	47.0 (8.3)	58.9 (14.9)	63.8 (17.7)	61.6 (16.4)	48.0 (8.9)	35.5 (1.9)	26.1 (−3.3)	20.7 (−6.3)	13.0 (−10.6)
Record low °F (°C)	−11 (−24)	−8 (−22)	10 (−12)	25 (−4)	36 (2)	45 (7)	50 (10)	44 (7)	31 (−1)	22 (−6)	10 (−12)	−8 (−22)	−11 (−24)
Average precipitation inches (mm)	3.93 (100)	4.36 (111)	5.66 (144)	5.73 (146)	4.78 (121)	3.89 (99)	4.07 (103)	2.83 (72)	2.92 (74)	3.79 (96)	4.52 (115)	5.59 (142)	52.07 (1,323)
Average snowfall inches (cm)	0.4 (1.0)	0.5 (1.3)	0.4 (1.0)	0.0 (0.0)	0.0 (0.0)	0.0 (0.0)	0.0 (0.0)	0.0 (0.0)	0.0 (0.0)	0.0 (0.0)	0.0 (0.0)	0.0 (0.0)	1.3 (3.3)
Average precipitation days (≥ 0.01 in)	9.7	9.6	11.0	9.1	10.1	7.7	7.5	6.9	6.0	7.3	9.0	10.4	104.3
Average snowy days (≥ 0.1 in)	0.2	0.3	0.1	0.0	0.0	0.0	0.0	0.0	0.0	0.0	0.1	0.0	0.7
Source 1: NOAA
Source 2: National Weather Service

== Demographics ==
Historical population
Census	Pop.	Note	%±
1880	627		—
1890	1,126		79.6%
1900	1,707		51.6%
1910	4,810		181.8%
1920	5,074		5.5%
1930	4,314		−15.0%
1940	4,449		3.1%
1950	4,530		1.8%
1960	5,134		13.3%
1970	6,196		20.7%
1980	6,220		0.4%
1990	5,910		−5.0%
2000	5,181		−12.3%
2010	4,115		−20.6%
2020	3,575		−13.1%
2025 (est.)	3,253	▼	−9.0%
U.S. Decennial Census

=== 2020 census ===
Marianna Racial Composition
Race	Num.	Perc.
White	627	17.54%
Black or African American	2,750	76.92%
Native American	9	0.25%
Asian	6	0.17%
Pacific Islander	1	0.03%
Other/Mixed	132	3.69%
Hispanic or Latino	50	1.4%

As of the 2020 United States census, there were 3,575 people, 1,545 households, and 831 families residing in the city.

=== 2010 census ===
As of the census of 2010, there were 4,115 people, 1,664 households, and 1,068 families residing in the town. The population density was 1,440.0 inhabitants per square mile (556.0/km^{2}). There were 2,196 housing units at an average density of 610.4 per square mile (235.7/km^{2}). The racial makeup of the town was 20.9% White, 76.6% Black or African American, 0.2% Native American, 0.8% Asian, 0.0% from other races, and 1.3% from two or more races. 0.7% of the population were Hispanic or Latino of any race.

There were 1,664 households, out of which 27.6% had children under the age of 18 living with them, 27.8% were married couples living together, 31.9% had a female householder with no husband present, and 35.8% were non-families. 32.8% of all households were made up of individuals, and 13.7% had someone living alone who was 65 years of age or older. The average household size was 2.43 and the average family size was 3.10.

In the town, the population was spread out, with 34.4% under the age of 18, 9.5% from 18 to 24, 22.0% from 25 to 44, 19.4% from 45 to 64, and 14.7% who were 65 years of age or older. The median age was 31 years. For every 100 females, there were 77.4 males. For every 100 females age 18 and over, there were 70.6 males.

The median income for a household in the town was $16,351, and the median income for a family was $29,624. Males had a median income of $28,542 versus $19,045 for females. The per capita income for the town was $10,253. About 32.8% of families and 37.0% of the population were below the poverty line, including 46.2% of those under age 18 and 33.1% of those age 65 or over.

== Education ==
As of 2011, there are five schools in Marianna, two of which are private. The public schools in Lee County School District are Lee High School, Anna Strong Middle School, and Whitten Elementary School. One of the private schools is Lee Academy.

== Earthquake fault ==
On January 21, 2009, the director of the Arkansas Earthquake Center at the University of Arkansas announced the discovery of a major fault line near Marianna which could generate a 7.0 earthquake in the future. The fault is close to, but appears to be separate from, the nearby New Madrid Seismic Zone.

== Infrastructure ==
=== Utilities ===
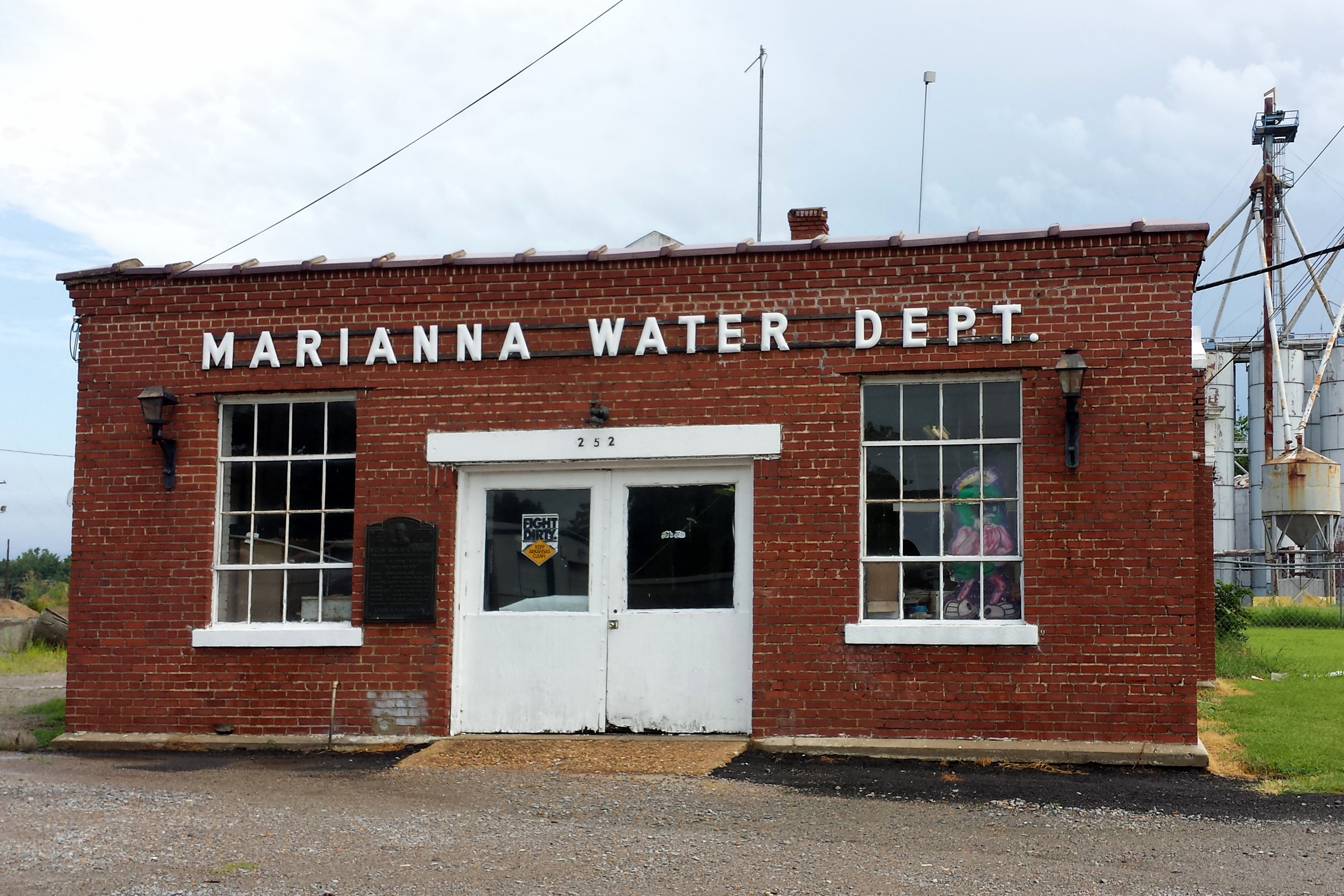
Water department

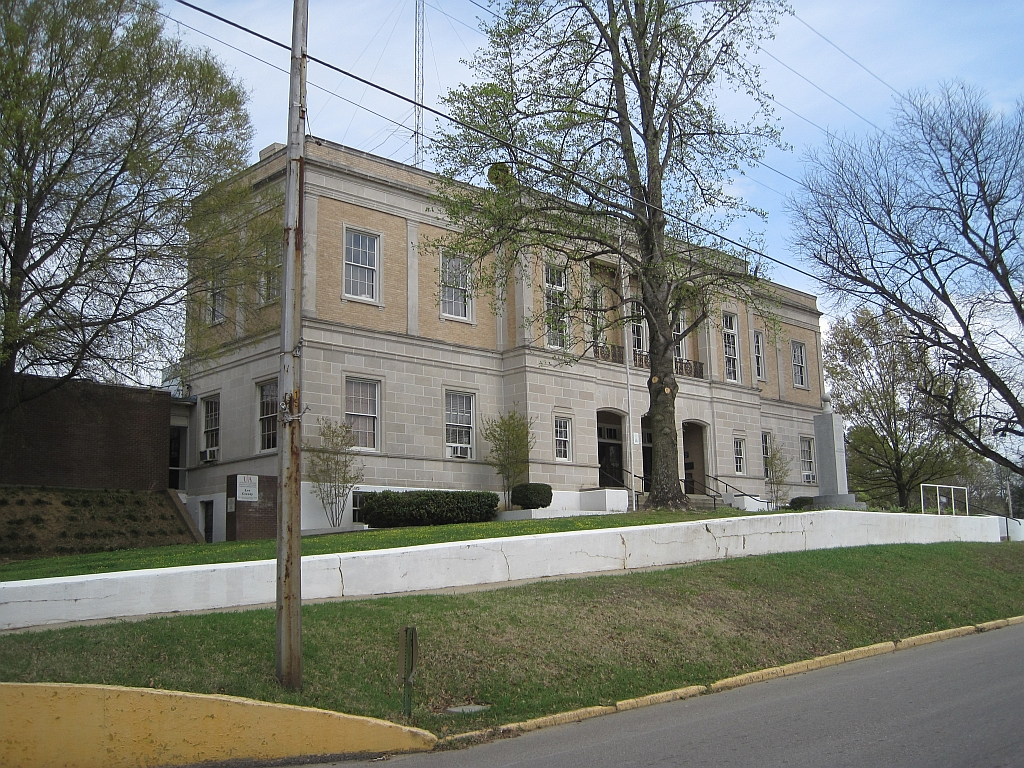
Lee County Courthouse in Marianna

The Marianna Water and Sewer Commission directs the Marianna Water Department, which treats and distributes potable water to the residents and commercial users of the town. The department also owns and operates a wastewater collection system, which collects wastewater from over 4,000 service connections and uses a series of laterals, interceptors and five lift stations to gravity flow wastewater to the Marianna Wastewater Treatment Plant (WWTP). At the WWTP, two lagoons are used to treat wastewater and discharge treated effluent to the L'Anguille River in accordance with the town's NPDES permit administered by the Arkansas Department of Environmental Quality.

The Lee County Water Association provides water to rural areas surrounding the town.

== Notable people ==
- Kevin Campbell, former pitcher for the Oakland Athletics
- The Chambers Brothers, notorious drug kingpins based in Detroit in the 1980s
- Curtis Lynn Collier, federal district court judge for the Eastern District of Tennessee
- Catherine Eagles, first female district court judge in the Middle District of North Carolina
- Charlie Flowers, member of College Football Hall of Fame
- Carlos Hall, football player who played defensive end for the Kansas City Chiefs
- Oliver Lake, alto saxophone player and composer who received a Guggenheim Fellowship in 1993
- Roy C. "Bill" Lewellen was the second African-American to serve in the Arkansas Senate during the 20th century.
- Robert McFerrin, opera singer who was the first African-American man to sing at the Metropolitan Opera
- Oscar Polk, Broadway actor who played a slave in Gone with the Wind
- Rodney E. Slater, United States Secretary of Transportation 1997 - 2001
- Terry Wallis, man who regained awareness after spending 19 years in a minimally conscious state
- Jean Yarbrough, film and television director and producer

== Notable businesses ==
- Jones Bar-B-Q Diner, the only James Beard Award winner in the state
