= Arkansas Highway 259 =

State highway in Arkansas, United States

Highway 259
- AR 259 highlighted in red

Route information
- Maintained by ArDOT

Section 1
- Length: 12.11 mi (19.49 km)
- South end: AR 238
- North end: US 70 at Lake Grove

Section 2
- Length: 6.90 mi (11.10 km)
- South end: AR 306
- North end: AR 284

Section 3
- Length: 3.14 mi (5.05 km)
- South end: AR 364
- North end: AR 42 near Hickory Ridge

Location
- Country: United States
- State: Arkansas
- Counties: Lee, St. Francis, Cross

Highway system
- Arkansas Highway System; Interstate; US; State; Business; Spurs; Suffixed; Scenic; Heritage
← AR 258	→ AR 260

Highway 259 (AR 259, Ark. 259, and Hwy. 259) is a designation for three north–south state highways in northeast Arkansas. A southern route of 12.11 miles (19.49 km) runs north from Highway 238 to US Route 70 (US 70) at Lake Grove, Arkansas. A second route of 6.90 miles (11.10 km) begins at Highway 306 and runs north to Highway 284 in Cross County. A third route of 3.14 miles (5.05 km) begins at Highway 364 and runs north to Highway 42 near Hickory Ridge.

== Route description ==
=== AR 238 to Lake Grove ===
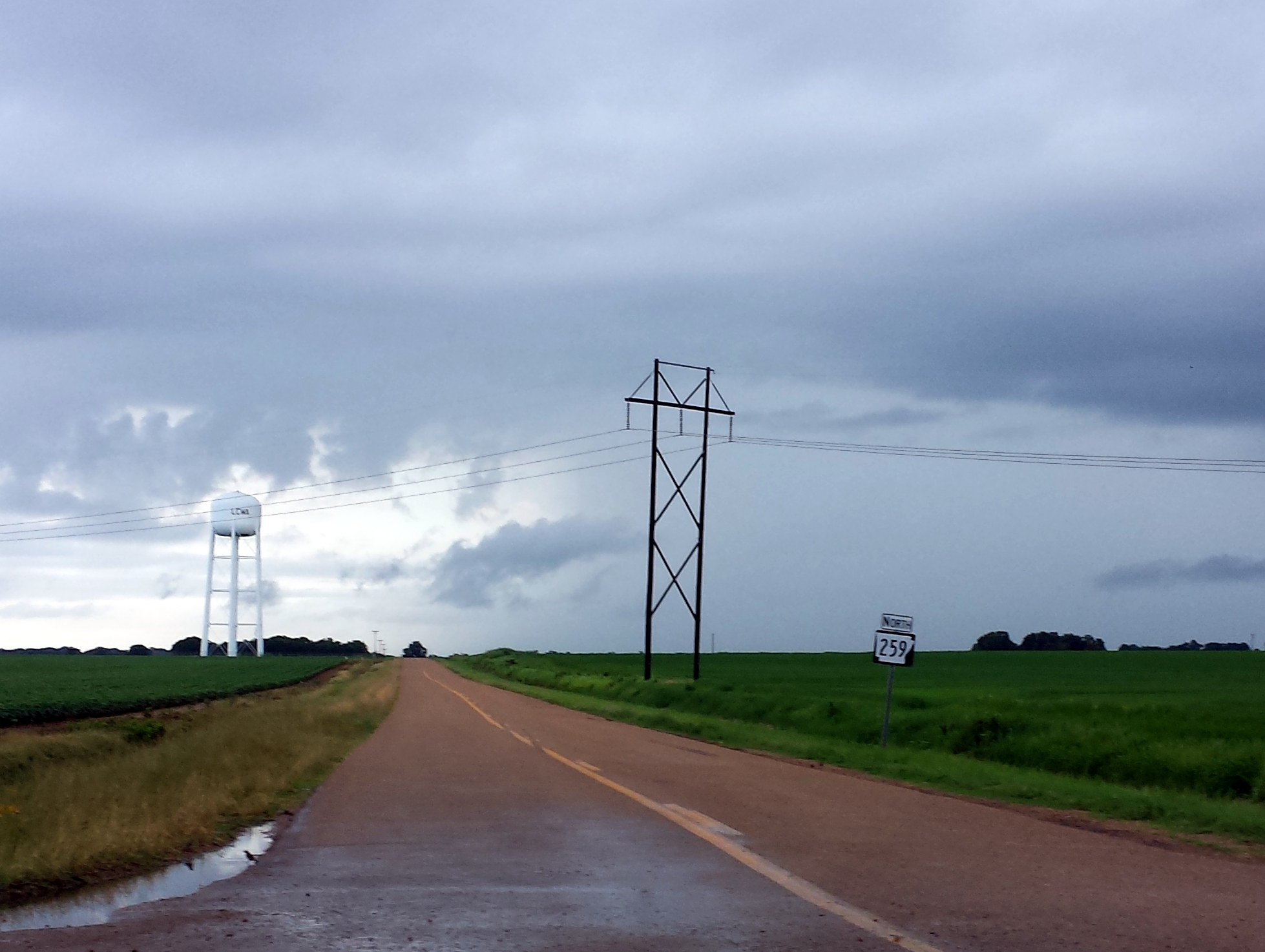
First Highway 259 reassurance shield north of Highway 238

Highway 259 begins at Highway 238 west of Moro and runs north past a cemetery before turning east and meeting Highway 78 at South Plains. The two routes have a brief concurrency north before Highway 78 splits to the northwest and Highway 259 continues north. Shortly after this junction, Highway 259 serves as the southern terminus for Highway 261. The highway runs north through New Salem before entering St. Francis County, where it terminates at US 70.

=== AR 306 to AR 284 ===
Highway 259 begins in the northwest corner of St. Francis County at Highway 306 and runs due north through flat farmland. The route runs into Cross County where it terminates at Highway 284. The highway does not cross or overlap with any other state highways and essentially serves as a connector route between two rural routes.

=== AR 364 to Hickory Ridge ===
Highway 259 begins at Highway 364 in eastern Cross County. The route runs north through farmland to Highway 42 in Hickory Ridge, where it terminates.

== Major intersections ==
Mile markers reset at concurrences.

County	Location	mi	km	Destinations	Notes
Lee		0.00	0.00	AR 238 – Brinkley, Moro	Southern terminus
Lee	South Plains	0.00	0.00	AR 78 east – Moro	Southern end of AR 78 concurrency
Lee	South Plains	0.00	0.00	AR 78 west – Wheatley	Northern end of AR 78 concurrency
Lee	South Plains	0.43	0.69	AR 261 north – Holub	Southern terminus of AR 261
St. Francis	Lake Grove	12.11	19.49	US 70 – Brinkley, Forrest City	Northern terminus
St. Francis	Gap in route				
St. Francis		0.00	0.00	AR 306	Southern terminus
Cross		6.90	11.10	AR 284 – Wynne	Northern terminus
Cross	Gap in route				
Cross		0.00	0.00	AR 364	Southern terminus
Cross	Hickory Ridge	3.14	5.05	AR 42 – Hickory Ridge, Cherry Valley	Northern terminus
1.000 mi = 1.609 km; 1.000 km = 0.621 mi: Concurrency terminus

== See also ==
- List of state highways in Arkansas
