= Arkansas Highway 42 =

State highway in Arkansas, United States

Highway 42

Route information
- Maintained by ArDOT
- Length: 53.54 mi (86.16 km)
- Existed: 1926–present

Major junctions
- West end: AR 37 near Beedeville
- US 49 in Hickory Ridge; AR 1 in Cherry Valley; AR 75 at Coldwater; I-55 / US 61 / US 78 in Turrell
- East end: Barton Street in Turrell

Location
- Country: United States
- State: Arkansas
- Counties: Jackson, Cross, Crittenden

Highway system
- Arkansas Highway System; Interstate; US; State; Business; Spurs; Suffixed; Scenic; Heritage
← I-42	→ AR 43

Arkansas Highway 42 (AR 42) is an east–west state highway in northeast Arkansas. The route runs 53.54 miles (86.16 km) from Highway 37 south of Beedeville east to Barton Street in Turrell. The highway is a rural, two-lane road with relatively low traffic serving a sparsely populated agricultural area of Arkansas. Highway 42 is one of the original state highways created during the 1926 Arkansas state highway numbering, and has remained largely unchanged since bridge construction and an eastward extension in 1938. It is maintained by the Arkansas Department of Transportation (ARDOT).

== Route description ==
Highway 42 runs in southeastern Jackson County, within a historic and cultural region known as the Arkansas Delta. The western terminus is at Highway 37 south of Beedeville and just east of the Cache River National Wildlife Refuge; Highway 42 runs due east as a section line road to a junction with Highway 145 before entering Cross County.

Entering Cross County, Highway 42 bridges Bayou DeView before entering the small town of Hickory Ridge. Shortly after entering town, the highway crosses the Union Pacific Railway tracks and intersects U.S. Route 49 (US 49). Highway 42 continues east, serving as the northern terminus of Highway 259 at the eastern city limits before continuing east as a section line road, curving to maintain alignment near Brushy Creek Wildlife Management Area and serving as the northern terminus of Highway 193 on its way through sparsely populated agricultural land. Shortly after crossing the L'Anguille River, Highway 42 enters the small town of Cherry Valley. Highway 42 intersects Highway 1 at a skew intersection, beginning a concurrency east with Highway 1B. As the routes approach downtown Cherry Valley, Highway 1B turns northward, with Highway 42 continuing east across the Union Pacific Railway tracks and across the loess hills of Crowley's Ridge.

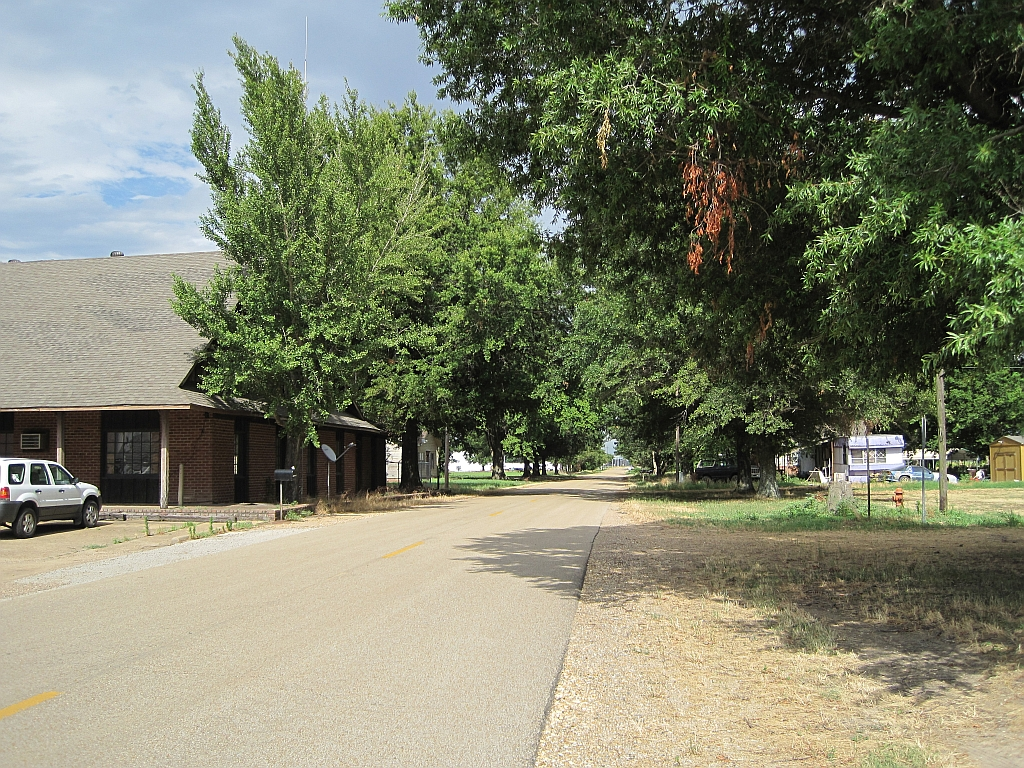
Highway 42 in Twist

Along the eastern edge of Crowley's Ridge, Highway 42 intersects Highway 163 (Crowley's Ridge Parkway) in the unincorporated community of Birdeye before entering the St. Francis Lowlands. Highway 42 crosses two man-made drainage ditches and their levees (the St. Francis Bay Ditch and Cross County Ditch) before intersecting Highway 75 and crossing the St. Francis River at Coldwater. The route continues eastward, passing through Twist and entering Crittenden County.

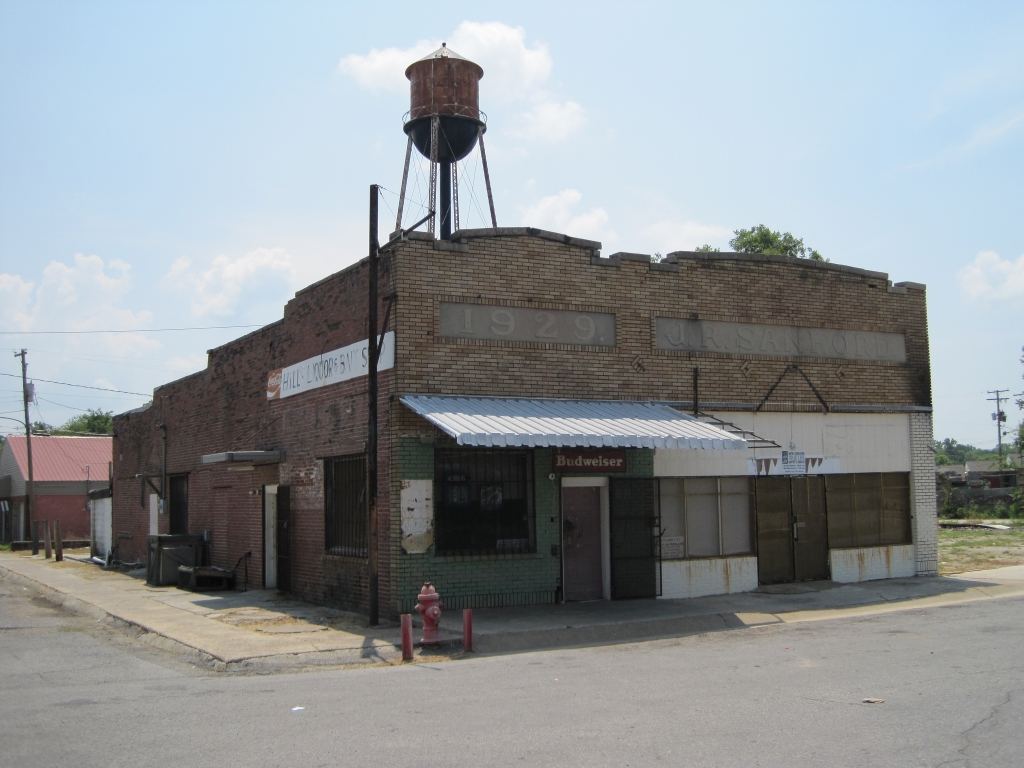
Eastern terminus at Barton Street in Turrell

Highway 42 passes through agricultural lands to intersect Highway 149 at Three Forks. The two highways form a concurrency heading northeast for 3.0 miles (4.8 km), until Highway 42 turns right, ending the concurrency. Highway 42 continues east as a section line road, intersecting Highway 118 near Heafer and crossing Big Creek twice before an interchange with I-55/US 61/US 78 in Turrell. It continues east in Turrell, intersecting Highway 77 and the BNSF Railway tracks before turning north toward downtown Turrell. Becoming Hammond Street, Highway 42 briefly straddles the border between Turrell and the Wapanocca National Wildlife Refuge, intersecting the road leading to the NWR Headquarters before returning within the city limits. Highway 42 follows the BNSF tracks north to Barton Street, where it terminates.

The ArDOT maintains Highway 42 like all other parts of the state highway system. As a part of these responsibilities, the department tracks the volume of traffic using its roads in surveys using a metric called average annual daily traffic (AADT). The ArDOT estimates the traffic level for a segment of roadway for any average day of the year in these surveys. The peak traffic volume is within Cherry Valley, estimated at 1,500 vehicles per day (VPD), followed by 920 VPD along the segment in Hickory Ridge. The remainder of the segments have traffic volumes below 800 VPD. For reference, the American Association of State Highway and Transportation Officials (AASHTO) classifies roads with fewer than 400 vehicles per day as a very low volume local road.

No segment of Highway 42 has been listed as part of the National Highway System, a network of roads important to the nation's economy, defense, and mobility.

== History ==
During the 1926 Arkansas state highway numbering, State Road 42 was designated between the current western terminus at Highway 37 to Highway 16 (present-day US 64) near Parkin. By 1938, bridge construction had been completed, allowing an extension through Coldwater to Three Forks. Highway 42 replaced Highway 75 between Three Forks and US 61 in Turrell, with the former segment from Coldwater to US 64 in Parkin becoming Highway 75. The bridge over the St. Francis River was lost in 1950, a replacement was opened to the south at Coldwater in 1968.

The Arkansas General Assembly deleted the extension between Three Forks and Turrell in favor of extending Highway 149 by Act 383 of 1951. At the request of the Crittenden County Judge, the State Highway Commission studied the roadway and reinstated the extension during a meeting August 25–28, 1953. After hearing a presentation during their meeting on August 26, 1954, the Highway Commission offered a swap to the Crittenden County Judge to remove the recently re-designated segment in favor of paving a few other roads in the vicinity and accepting them into the highway system. The offer was revised on March 9, 1955, to only extend Highway 42 from US 61/US 63 (present-day I-55) to downtown Turrell.

== Major intersections ==
Mile markers reset at some concurrencies. (Note: Although Arkansas highways normally terminate when intersected by a route of greater importance, Highway 149's history as a former alignment of US 49 is reflected when intersecting state highways of a lesser number. Although routes of a lower number and the same class usually take priority at a concurrency, Highway 149 has preference to Highway 42.)

County	Location	mi	km	Destinations	Notes
Jackson		0.00	0.00	AR 37 – McCrory, Newport	Western terminus
Jackson		3.14	5.05	AR 145 south	Northern terminus of AR 145
Cross	Hickory Ridge	7.54	12.13	US 49 (Flora Street) – Jonesboro, Brinkley	
Cross	Hickory Ridge	8.22	13.23	AR 259 south to AR 364	Northern terminus of AR 259
Cross		12.35	19.88	AR 193 south	Northern terminus of AR 193
Cross	Cherry Valley	21.00	33.80	AR 1 – Jonesboro, Wynne AR 1B begins	Southern terminus of AR 1B
Cross	Cherry Valley	21.34	34.34	AR 1B north	East end of AR 1B overlap
Cross		26.68	42.94	AR 163 – Bay Village, Levesque	
Cross	Coldwater	33.53	53.96	AR 75 – Marked Tree, Parkin	
Cross	Coldwater	33.56– 33.62	54.01– 54.11	Bridge over the St. Francis River	
Crittenden	Three Forks	43.69	70.31	AR 149 south (Barton Street) – Earle	West end of AR 149 overlap
Crittenden		0.00	0.00	AR 149 north (Barton Street) – Marked Tree	East end of AR 149 overlap
Crittenden		3.28	5.28	AR 118 – Tyronza	
Crittenden	Turrell	7.66	12.33	I-55 (US 61 / US 78) – Blytheville, Memphis	Exit 21 on I-55
Crittenden	Turrell	9.19	14.79	AR 77	
Crittenden	Turrell	9.85	15.85	Barton Street	Eastern terminus
1.000 mi = 1.609 km; 1.000 km = 0.621 mi: Concurrency terminus
