= Arkansas Highway 364 =

State highway in Arkansas, United States

Highway 364

Route information
- Maintained by ArDOT
- Length: 19.098 mi (30.735 km)
- Existed: April 27, 1971–present

Major junctions
- West end: US 49 at Tilton
- AR 1 in Vanndale
- East end: AR 163

Location
- Country: United States
- State: Arkansas
- Counties: Cross

Highway system
- Arkansas Highway System; Interstate; US; State; Business; Spurs; Suffixed; Scenic; Heritage
← AR 363	→ AR 365

Highway 364 (AR 364, Hwy. 364) is an east–west state highway in Cross County, Arkansas. The highway connects a series of rural communities and farmland to the principal north–south highways in Cross County. Highway 364 is maintained by the Arkansas Department of Transportation (ArDOT). A former designation, also in Cross County, connected Togo to the state highway system between 1973 and 1983.

== Route description ==
Highway 364 serves an area of rural Cross County, part of the Arkansas Delta region dominated by flat fields used for row agriculture. No segment of Highway 364 has been listed as part of the National Highway System, a network of roads important to the nation's economy, defense, and mobility.

Highway 364 begins at the unincorporated community of Tilton at US Highway 49 (US 49) in a rural area of western Cross County. It runs due east before turning north and serving as the southern terminus of Highway 259. Highway 364 turns east at this intersection, becoming a section line road. Running east, the highway passes through farmland, has a junction with Highway 193, and bridges the L'Anguille River before curving toward Vanndale. A former county seat of Cross County, Vanndale is now a small unincorporated community. Highway 364 intersects Highway 1 and Highway 1 Business. Highway 364 and forms a concurrency with the latter toward the historic center of Vanndale. The two routes turn north near the Vanndale post office, and Highway 364 turns right shortly thereafter, ending the concurrency. East of Vanndale, Highway 364 enters Crowley's Ridge, a series of forested loess hills rising from the lower Delta. Now a winding route with more homes along the shoulders, Highway 364 passes through Pleasant Hill before intersecting Highway 163, where it terminates.

The ArDOT maintains Highway 364 like all other parts of the state highway system. As a part of these responsibilities, the department tracks the volume of traffic using its roads in surveys using a metric called average annual daily traffic (AADT). ARDOT estimates the traffic level for a segment of roadway for any average day of the year in these surveys. As of 2019, AADT was estimated as 160 vehicles per day (VPD) near the western terminus, and 370 VPD near the eastern terminus. The highest AADT was 730 VPD at Vanndale while concurrent with Highway 1B. For reference, the American Association of State Highway and Transportation Officials (AASHTO), classifies roads with fewer than 400 vehicles per day as a very low volume local road.

== Major intersections ==
The entire route is in Cross County.

Location	mi	km	Destinations	Notes
Tilton	0.0	0.0	US 49 – Fair Oaks, Jonesboro	Western terminus
	3.2	5.1	AR 259 north	Southern terminus of AR 259
	6.3	10.1	AR 193	
Vanndale	14.3	23.0	AR 1 – Wynne, Harrisburg AR 1B begins	Southern terminus of AR 1B
Vanndale	Gap in route (0.9 mi; 1.4 km)			
Vanndale	0.0	0.0	AR 1B north – Harrisburg	East end of AR 1B overlap
	5.2	8.4	AR 163 – Birdeye, Levesque	Eastern terminus
1.000 mi = 1.609 km; 1.000 km = 0.621 mi: Concurrency terminus

== History ==
Highway 364 was created by the Arkansas State Highway Commission on April 27, 1971. The designation initially started at Highway 39 (Note: Highway 39 became US 49 between Brinkley and Jonesboro on April 26, 1978.) and ran east to Highway 1 at Vanndale. In 1973, the Arkansas General Assembly passed Act 9 of 1973. The act directed county judges and legislators to designate up to 12 miles (19 km) of county roads as state highways in each county. The highway was extended east to Highway 163 on April 25, 1973, as part of the Act 9 system expansion.

=== Former route ===
Highway 364
- Location: Cross County
- Length: 2.15 mi (3.46 km)
- Existed: April 25, 1973–June 30, 1983

Highway 364 (AR 364, Hwy. 364) is a former state highway in Cross County. It was a rural, two-lane highway connecting the unincorporated area known as Togo to the state highway system. It ended at Cross County Road 424 near the St. Francis River. The highway did not cross or concur with any other state highways.

History

The designation was created along a former county road as part of a state highway system expansion the Arkansas General Assembly passed (Act 9 of 1973). It was deleted on June 30, 1983, at the request of the Cross County Judge in exchange for an extension of Highway 163 to Wittsburg.

Major intersections

The entire route was in Cross County.

Location	mi	km	Destinations	Notes
	0.00	0.00	AR 75	Western terminus
	2.15	3.46	CR 424	Eastern terminus
1.000 mi = 1.609 km; 1.000 km = 0.621 mi
