= Arkansas Highway 163 =

State highway in Arkansas, United States

Highway 163
- AR 163 highlighted in red, AR 163S in blue

Route information
- Maintained by ArDOT
- Length: 42.57 mi (68.51 km)
- Existed: July 10, 1957–present

Major junctions
- South end: CR 739 at Wittsburg
- US 64 / Crowley's Ridge Pkwy. at Levesque
- North end: AR 1 / AR 1B / Crowley's Ridge Pkwy. in Jonesboro

Location
- Country: United States
- State: Arkansas
- Counties: Craighead, Poinsett, Cross

Highway system
- Arkansas Highway System; Interstate; US; State; Business; Spurs; Suffixed; Scenic; Heritage
← AR 162	→ AR 164

Highway 163 (AR 163, Ark. 163, and Hwy. 163) is a north–south state highway in Northeast Arkansas. The highway begins at Wittsburg and runs 42.57 miles (68.51 km) northeast to Highway 1, Highway 1 Business (AR 1B) and Crowley's Ridge Parkway (CRP) in Jonesboro. A spur route runs in Jonesboro. All routes are maintained by the Arkansas Department of Transportation (ArDOT). Almost all of the route is concurrent with Crowley's Ridge Parkway, with a portion also serving as an Arkansas Heritage Trail for its use during the Civil War.

== Route description ==
Highway 163 runs in Northeast Arkansas, a region mostly characterized by the Arkansas Delta, a sparsely populated rural area with farms and small settlements. However, Highway 163 runs its entire length along Crowley's Ridge, a small loess ridge rising above the flat Delta. The route passes several cultural and historical points in the region, including a historic cotton gin and an American Civil War trail.

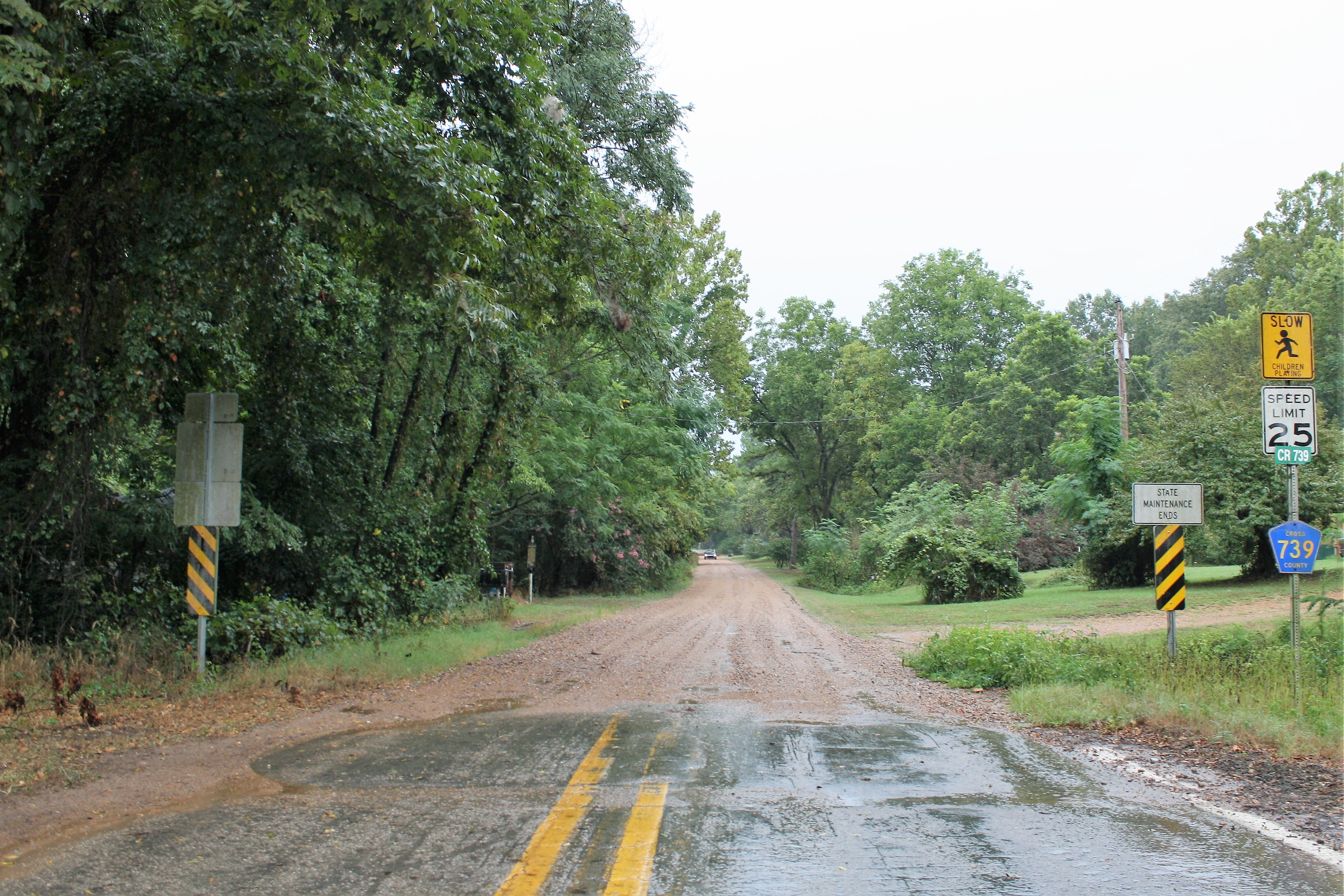
State maintenance ends at the southern terminus at Wittsburg

State maintenance begins at Wittsburg near the Wittsburg Store and Gas Station, with the roadway continuing south as a county road. Highway 163 runs north to a junction with US 64 and the Crowley's Ridge Parkway (CRP). The routes briefly overlap to the east, with Highway 163/CRP turning north and passing the John H. Johnston Cotton Gin Historic District and the Capt. Isaac N. Deadrick House, both listed on the National Register of Historic Places. Highway 163/CRP run north, serving as the eastern terminus for Highway 364 and meeting Highway 42 near Birdeye. After crossing into Poinsett County, the routes serve as the southern terminus of Highway 373 before passing Lake Poinsett State Park. Highway 163/CRP intersect Highway 14 east of Harrisburg, including a brief overlap. Continuing north, Highway 163/CRP intersect Highway 214, Highway 158, and Highway 69 before entering Craighead County.

Highway 163 has a junction with Highway 158 in southern Craighead County before turning northwest toward Jonesboro. Shortly after entering the city, Highway 163 Spur begins at the parent route, running north as Apt Drive through a residential subdivision. Highway 163 continues west, intersecting with Highway 1, where it terminates, with the roadway continuing north as Highway 1B.

== History ==
Between Jonesboro and US 64, Highway 163 is designated as an Arkansas Heritage Trail. During the Civil War, Union General John Wynn Davidson used the route to march cavalry from southeast Missouri down Crowley's Ridge, following a rumor Confederate General Sterling Price's army was planning to attack Missouri via Crowley's Ridge. After marching and finding no Confederates, General Davidson headed west and started the Little Rock Campaign in 1863.

The route was established by the Arkansas State Highway Commission (ASHC) on July 10, 1957, beginning at the Poinsett County line and running south through Birdeye to a county road. The southern terminus was extended south by 2.1 miles (3.4 km) on September 17, 1958. The route was created in accordance with Act 148 of the 1957 General Assembly. It was extended south to Levesque on June 29, 1960. A second segment was created from Lake Poinsett State Park to Harrisburg on June 23, 1965, though the gap between the routes was closed four months later. The route was extended north to Jonesboro on July 29, 1976; the same order created the spur route.

On June 30, 1983, the route was extended south from Levesque to Wittsburg, along the original 1926 alignment of Highway 163. The extension was made in exchange for decommissioning a segment of Highway 364 at the request of the county judge of Cross County.

== Major intersections ==
Mile markers reset at some concurrencies.

County	Location	mi	km	Destinations	Notes
Cross	Wittsburg	0.00	0.00	Begin state maintenance at CR 739	Southern terminus
Cross	Levesque	2.20– 0.00	3.54– 0.00	US 64 / Crowley's Ridge Pkwy. south – Parkin, West Memphis, Wynne	Begin CRP overlap
Cross		6.91	11.12	AR 364 west – Vanndale	AR 364 eastern terminus
Cross	Birdeye	9.01	14.50	AR 42 – Cherry Valley, Birdeye	
Poinsett		15.55	25.03	AR 373 north – Marked Tree	AR 373 southern terminus
Poinsett	Lake Poinsett State Park	20.83	33.52	AR 600 east – Lake Poinsett State Park	AR 600 western terminus
Poinsett		23.22– 0.00	37.37– 0.00	AR 14 – Marked Tree, Harrisburg	
Poinsett		4.91	7.90	AR 214 east – Judd Hill	AR 214 western terminus
Poinsett		8.01	12.89	AR 158 west	AR 158 eastern terminus
Poinsett		10.08	16.22	AR 69 east – Trumann	AR 69 western terminus
Craighead		15.03	24.19	AR 158 east	
Craighead	Jonesboro	16.94	27.26	AR 163S north (Apt Drive)	AR 163 southern terminus
Craighead	Jonesboro	17.15	27.60	AR 1 (Stadium Boulevard) / AR 1B north (Harrisburg Road) / Crowley's Ridge Pkwy. north – Harrisburg, Paragould	Northern terminus, AR 1B southern terminus, end CRP overlap
1.000 mi = 1.609 km; 1.000 km = 0.621 mi: Concurrency terminus

== Jonesboro spur ==
Apt Drive
- Location: Jonesboro
- Length: 0.40 mi (640 m)
- Existed: July 29, 1976–present

Highway 163 Spur (AR 163S, Ark. 163S, Hwy. 163S, and Apt Drive) is a 0.40-mile (0.64 km) spur route in Jonesboro.

Major intersections

The entire route is in Jonesboro, Craighead County.

mi	km	Destinations	Notes
0.00	0.00	AR 163 – Jonesboro, Harrisburg	Southern terminus
0.40	0.64	AR 1 (Stadium Boulevard) – Jonesboro, Harrisburg	Northern terminus
1.000 mi = 1.609 km; 1.000 km = 0.621 mi

== Former route ==
State Road 163
- Location: Wittsburg–Levesque
- Length: 2.2 mi (3.5 km)
- Existed: May 28, 1942 (Note: Map note: Number Assigned May 28, 1942 Rt-163-S-1)–c. 1945

State Road 163 (AR 163, Ark. 163, and Hwy. 163) is a former state highway of 2.2 miles (3.5 km) in Cross County, Arkansas. The route began at Wittsburg and ran north to US 64 at Levesque.

History

Highway 163 was created on May 28, 1942. However, the route does not appear on the next statewide map in 1945 nor the Cross County map in 1947.

Major intersections

The entire route was in Cross County.

Location	mi	km	Destinations	Notes
Wittsburg	0.0	0.0	End state maintenance	Southern terminus
Levesque	2.2	3.5	US 64	Northern terminus
1.000 mi = 1.609 km; 1.000 km = 0.621 mi

== See also ==
- List of state highways in Arkansas
