= Birdeye, Arkansas =

- Unincorporated Community
- Interactive map of Birdeye, Arkansas
- Coordinates: 35°22′44″N 90°41′12″W
- Country: United States
- State: Arkansas
- County: Cross
- Elevation: 246 ft (75 m)
- Time zone: UTC-6 (Central (CST))
  - Summer (DST): UTC-5 (CDT)
- Postal code: 72324
- Area code: 870

Birdeye is an unincorporated community in Cross County, Arkansas, United States. It is located at the intersection of Highway 42 and Highway 163. It is 5.6 miles (9.0 km) from Cherry Valley, 7.9 miles (12.7 km) from Vanndale and 14.3 miles (23.0 km) from Wynne. The Arkansas State Veteran's Cemetery is 1 mile to the north.

On March 8, 1835, the Walnut Camp Post Office was established, which was discontinued on October 9, 1856 then reopened as Birdeye Post Office on March 24, 1904. It was renamed because African-American plantation workers attended a church that they called "the Bird's Eye View Church". It was shut down sometime before 2008 and was replaced by a restaurant and store.
