= Pleasant Hill, Cross County, Arkansas =

Pleasant Hill, Arkansas
- Unincorporated community
- Location within Arkansas Location within the United States
- Coordinates: 35°20′43″N 90°43′10″W
- Country: United States
- State: Arkansas
- County: Cross
- Elevation: 308 ft (94 m)
- Time zone: UTC-6 (Central (CST))
  - Summer (DST): UTC-5 (CDT)
- Area code: 870
- GNIS feature ID: 58400

Pleasant Hill is an unincorporated community in Cross County, Arkansas, United States. Pleasant Hill is located on Arkansas Highway 364, 3.8 miles (6.1 km) northeast of Vanndale.
