= Capt. Isaac N. Deadrick House =

Historic house in Arkansas, United States

- Formerly listed on the U.S. National Register of Historic Places
- Location within Arkansas Location within the United States
- Location: NW of jct. of US 64 and AR 163, Levesque, Arkansas
- Coordinates: 35°15′2″N 90°42′44″W
- Area: 2 acres (0.81 ha)
- Built: 1850
- Architectural style: Greek Revival, Plain Traditional
- NRHP reference No.: 93000964

Significant dates
- Added to NRHP: September 16, 1993
- Removed from NRHP: September 1, 2022

The Capt. Isaac N. Deadrick House is a historic house on the west side of Arkansas Highway 163, a short way north of its junction with United States Route 64 in the community of Levesque, Arkansas. It is a two-story wood frame T-shaped structure, probably built around 1850 by the slaves of the father-in-law of Isaac N. Deadrick, a prominent early settler of the area who later served as captain of a cavalry company in the Confederate Army. It is the oldest known house in Cross County, and has been extensively altered, although much of its original structure is discernible. It is five bays wide, with a central entry on the main (eastern) facade that is flanked by sidelight windows and topped by a transom window. On the second floor above this entry is another door, which (unlike the present main door) is probably original to the house.

The house was listed on the National Register of Historic Places in 1993, at which time it was reported to be in deteriorating condition. It was delisted in 2022.

== See also ==
- National Register of Historic Places listings in Cross County, Arkansas
