= Arkansas Highway 238 =

State highway in Arkansas, United States

Highway 238
- AR 238 in red, AR 238S in blue

Route information
- Maintained by ArDOT
- Length: 17.57 mi (28.28 km)
- Existed: July 10, 1957–present

Major junctions
- West end: US 49 / US 70 in Brinkley
- East end: US 79 near Moro

Location
- Country: United States
- State: Arkansas
- Counties: Lee, Monroe

Highway system
- Arkansas Highway System; Interstate; US; State; Business; Spurs; Suffixed; Scenic; Heritage
← AR 237	→ AR 239

Highway 238 (AR 238, Ark. 238, and Hwy. 238) is an east–west state highway in the Lower Arkansas Delta. The route of 17.57 miles (28.28 km) begins at US Highway 49/US Highway 70 (US 49/US 70) in Brinkley and runs east to US 79 near Moro. The route is maintained by the Arkansas State Highway and Transportation Department (AHTD).

== Route description ==
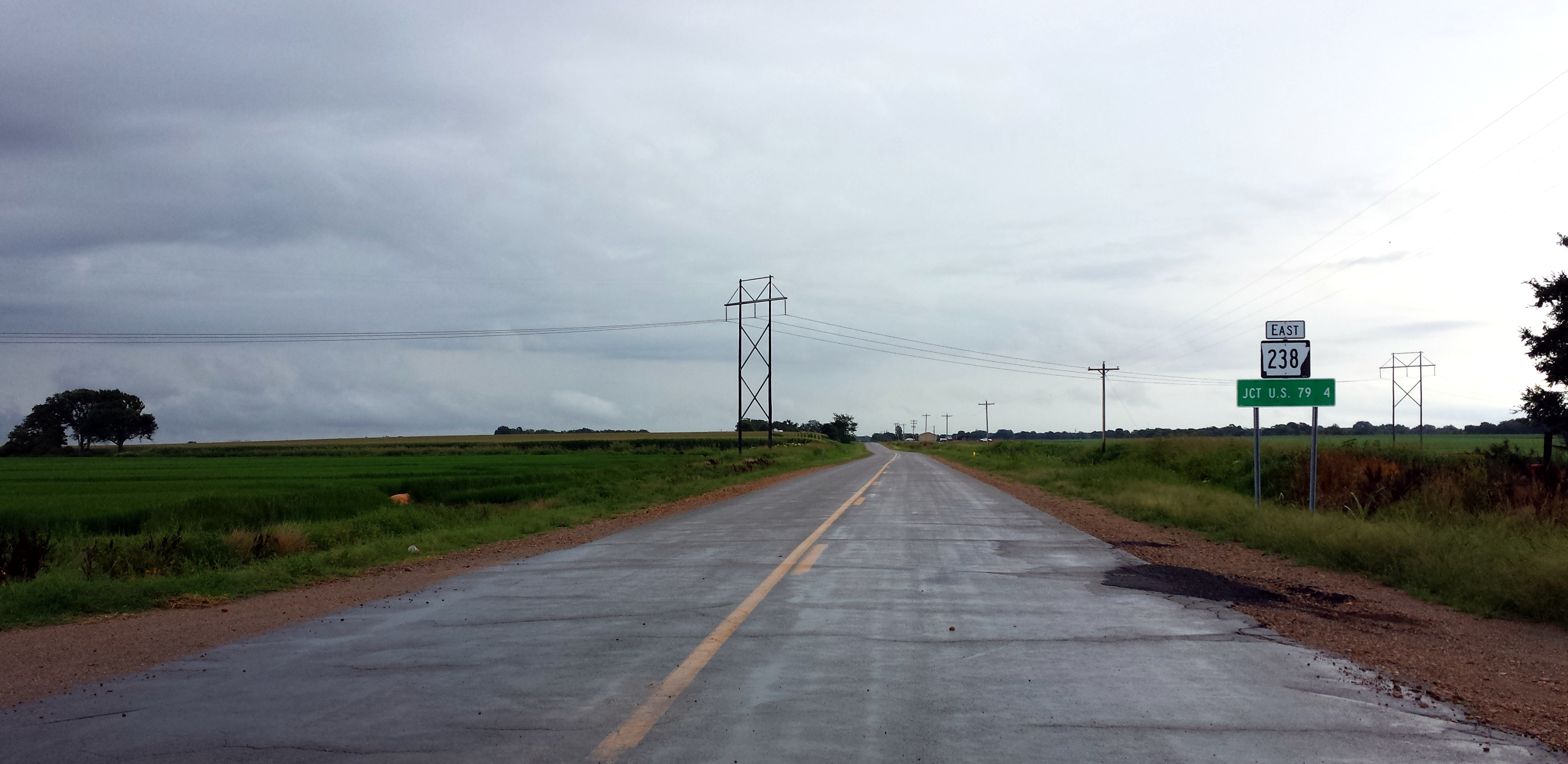
Highway 238 between Brinkley and Moro

Highway 238 begins at US 49/US 70 in Brinkley in the Arkansas Delta. The route runs east and south to an intersection with Highway 238 Spur before turning due east as a section line road and running to Lee County. Highway 238 continues east, crossing Big Creek and intersecting Highway 259 before entering Moro. In the town, Highway 238 intersects Highway 78 Spur near a city park. The route continues out of town heading south to US 79, where it terminates.

== History ==
The highway was added to the state highway system by the Arkansas State Highway Commission on July 10, 1957, as a road between State Road 39 (now US 49) and the Pleasant Valley community. Highway 238 was extended west to Grand Avenue in Brinkley during a rerouting of east–west highways in the vicinity on September 5, 1962. This action also created Highway 238 Spur. The route was extended east from Pleasant Valley to US 79 on June 23, 1965.

Highway 238 was rerouted from Cypress Street to Sycamore Street in Brinkley on May 29, 1975.

== Major intersections ==
County	Location	mi	km	Destinations	Notes
Monroe	Brinkley	0.00	0.00	US 49 / US 70 (Main Street) to I-40 – DeValls Bluff	Western terminus
Monroe	Brinkley	0.86	1.38	AR 238S (Grand Avenue)	Northern terminus of AR 238S
Lee		13.66	21.98	AR 259 north – South Plains	Southern terminus of AR 259
Lee	Moro	16.08	25.88	AR 78S east (Main Street) to AR 78	Eastern terminus of AR 78S
Lee		17.57	28.28	US 79 – Clarendon, Marianna	Eastern terminus
1.000 mi = 1.609 km; 1.000 km = 0.621 mi

== Spur route ==
Highway 238S
- Location: Brinkley
- Length: 0.65 mi (1,050 m)
- Existed: September 5, 1962–present

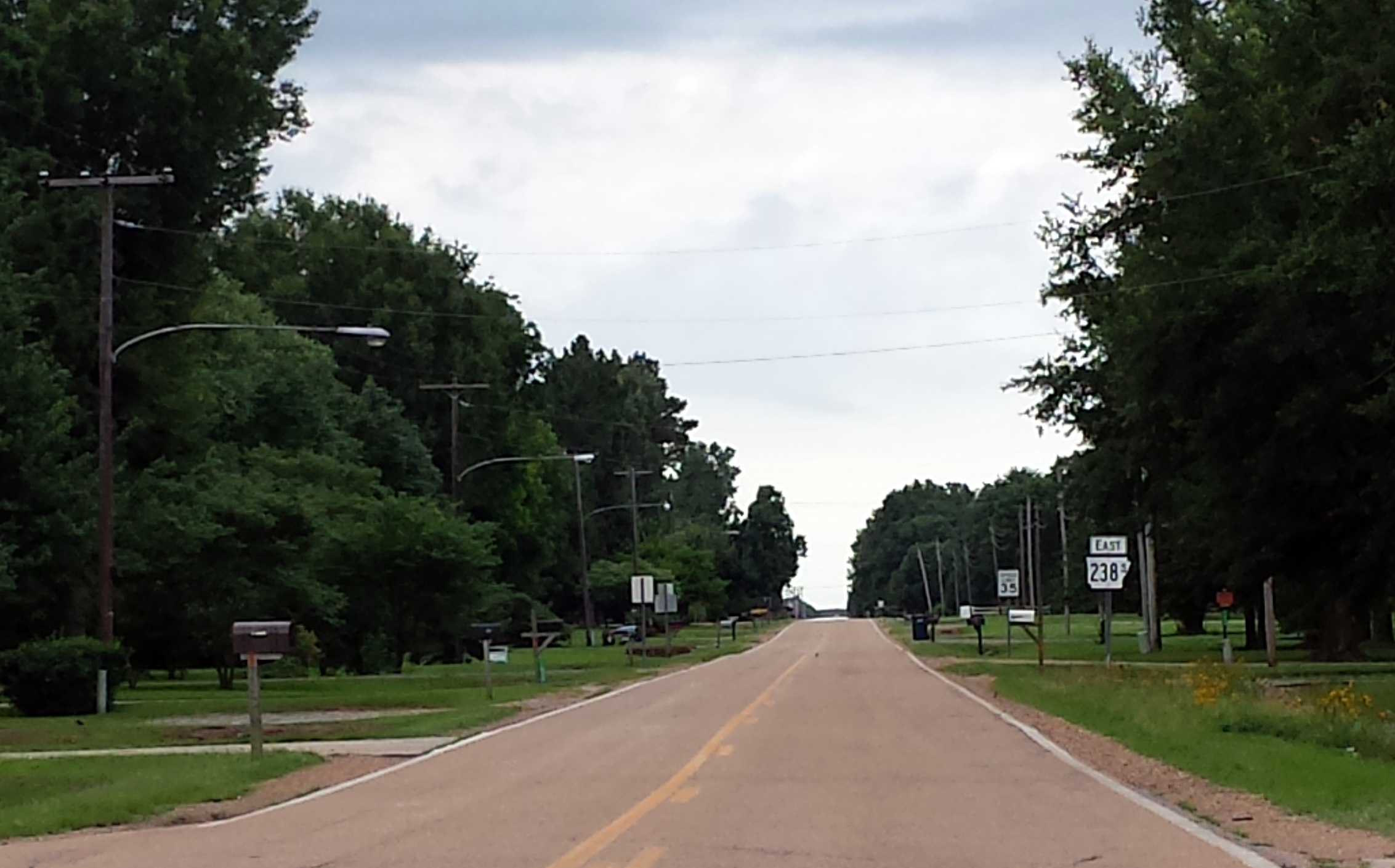
First reassurance marker on Hwy. 238S heading south

Highway 238 Spur (AR 238, Ark. 238S, and Hwy. 238S) is a spur route of 0.65 miles (1.05 km) in Brinkley. The route begins at Highway 238 and runs south to US 49 at the southern edge of Brinkley, where it terminates. The route was created on September 5, 1962. The route was designated during a reorganization of route numbers to increase continuity between Brinkley and Helena.

=== Major intersections ===
The entire route is in Brinkley, Monroe County.

mi	km	Destinations	Notes
0.00	0.00	AR 238 – Moro, Brinkley	Northern terminus
0.65	1.05	US 49 – Brinkley, Marvell	Southern terminus
1.000 mi = 1.609 km; 1.000 km = 0.621 mi
