= Arkansas Highway 334 =

Highway in Arkansas

Highway 334

Route information
- Maintained by ArDOT
- Existed: June 23, 1965–present

Section 1
- Length: 5.51 mi (8.87 km)
- West end: AR 1B in Forrest City
- East end: CR 734 / CR 735 / CR 736 at Tuni

Section 2
- Length: 3.27 mi (5.26 km)
- West end: US 79 near Hughes
- East end: CR 621 near Council

Location
- Country: United States
- State: Arkansas
- Counties: Lee, St. Francis

Highway system
- Arkansas Highway System; Interstate; US; State; Business; Spurs; Suffixed; Scenic; Heritage
← AR 333	→ AR 335

Highway 334 (AR 334, Ark. 334, and Hwy. 334) is a designation for two state highways in the Arkansas Delta. One segment begins at Highway 1 Business (AR 1B) in Forrest City and runs southeast to Tuni. A second route begins at US Highway 79 (US 79) at Bledsoe and runs east. Both routes were created in the mid-1960s, and have remained along the same alignment since. Both routes are maintained by the Arkansas Department of Transportation (ArDOT).

== Route description ==
=== Forrest City to Tuni ===
Highway 334 begins at Highway 1B (Washington Street) in Forrest City, a city of regional importance in the Arkansas Delta region. The highway winds southeast toward the Lee County line through Crowley's Ridge. The loess hill terrain makes the route wind and curve more than the surrounding highways in St. Francis County covering the Mississippi Alluvial Plain. Highway 334 intersects St. Francis County Road 735 (CR 735) at Tuni, with CR 734 and CR 736 continuing west and east, respectively.

As of 2016, the route had an annual average daily traffic (AADT) of 1,500 vehicles per day (VPD) within Forrest City, but 270 VPD east of the city, earning a classification as a very low volume local road by the American Association of State Highway and Transportation Officials (AASHTO), meaning fewer than 400 vehicles per day.

=== Bledsoe to Frenchman Bayou ===
Highway 334 begins at US 79 on the St. Francis-Lee County line in the Arkansas Delta. The route runs southeast across Millseed Lake. It turns south along a section line road to Lee County Road 621 (CR 621), where it terminates near a levee. The eastern terminus is less than one mile (1.6 km) from the Mississippi River and the Mississippi state line.

Near the eastern terminus, the AADT was measured as 120 VPD in 2016, dropping to 70 further east.

== Major intersections ==
County	Location	mi	km	Destinations	Notes
St. Francis	Forrest City	0.00	0.00	AR 1B (Washington Street) – Marianna	Western terminus
St. Francis	Tuni	5.51	8.87	CR 734 / CR 735 / CR 736 (Tuni Road)	Eastern terminus
Gap in route
St. Francis–Lee county line	Bledsoe	0.00	0.00	US 79 / Great River Road – Marianna, Hughes	Western terminus
Lee		3.27	5.26	CR 621	Eastern terminus
1.000 mi = 1.609 km; 1.000 km = 0.621 mi

== History ==
Both highways were created during a period of expansion in the state highway system in the 1960s. Highway 334 was first created in St. Francis County on June 23, 1965. The Lee County segment was created on November 23, 1966. Neither alignment has changed since creation.
