= Arkansas State Veterans Cemetery =

Two veterans cemeteries in Arkansas, US

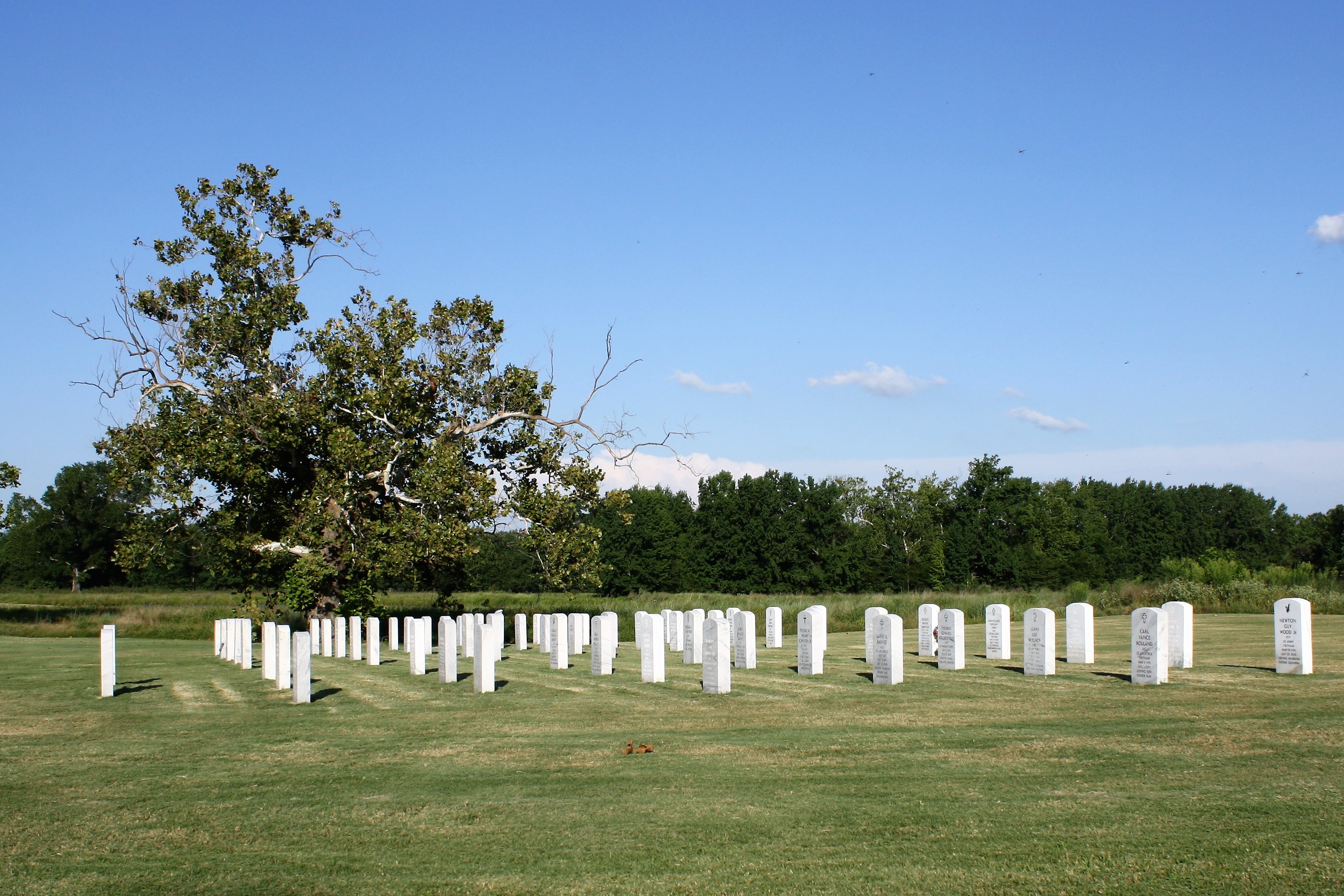
- Row of graves at the North Little Rock location

Details
- Established: November 11, 2001; 23 years ago
- Location: Cross County, Arkansas, U.S.
- Country: United States
- Type: State Cemetery
- Owned by: Arkansas Department of Veterans Affairs

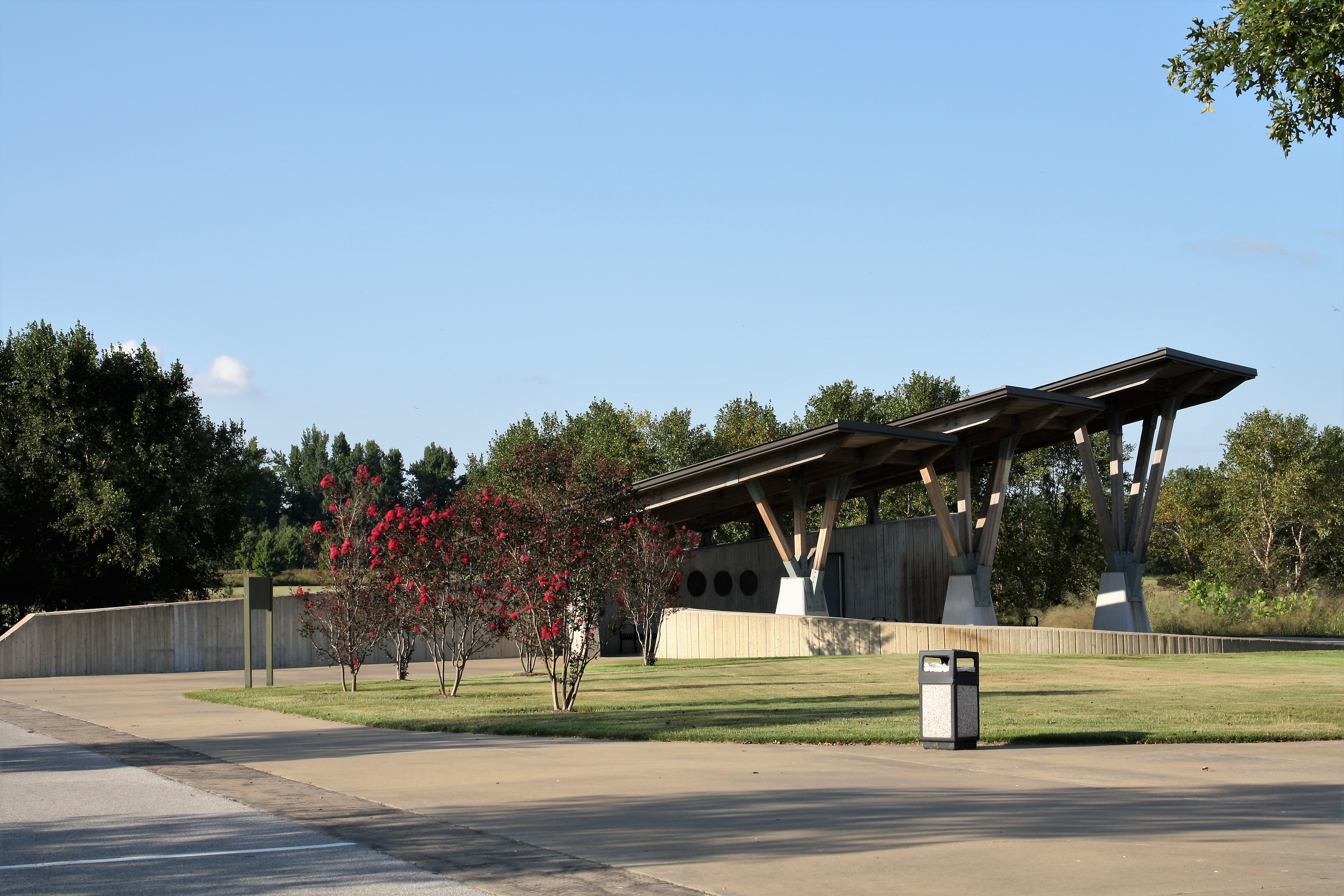
The Service Center at the Birdeye location

The Arkansas State Veterans Cemetery is a system of two veterans cemeteries owned and operated by the Arkansas Department of Veterans Affairs. One location is in North Little Rock (34°50′33″N 92°15′06″W) and the other is located in Birdeye (35°23′25″N 90°40′45″W). As of August 2017, there have been approximately 8,300 interments.

== History ==
=== North Little Rock ===
In 1997, the Arkansas General Assembly passed Act 235, which gave the Arkansas Department of Veterans Affairs the authority to establish a system of State Operated Veterans Cemeteries. The first to be established is located in North Little Rock which was dedicated on 11 November 2001.

=== Birdeye ===
The land for the Veterans Cemetery at Birdeye was purchased in 2008, and the cemetery finished construction in 2010. It received its first interment in February 2012. On August 10, 2018, it received an award from the Department of Veterans Affairs.
