= Business routes of Arkansas Highway 1 =

Highway system

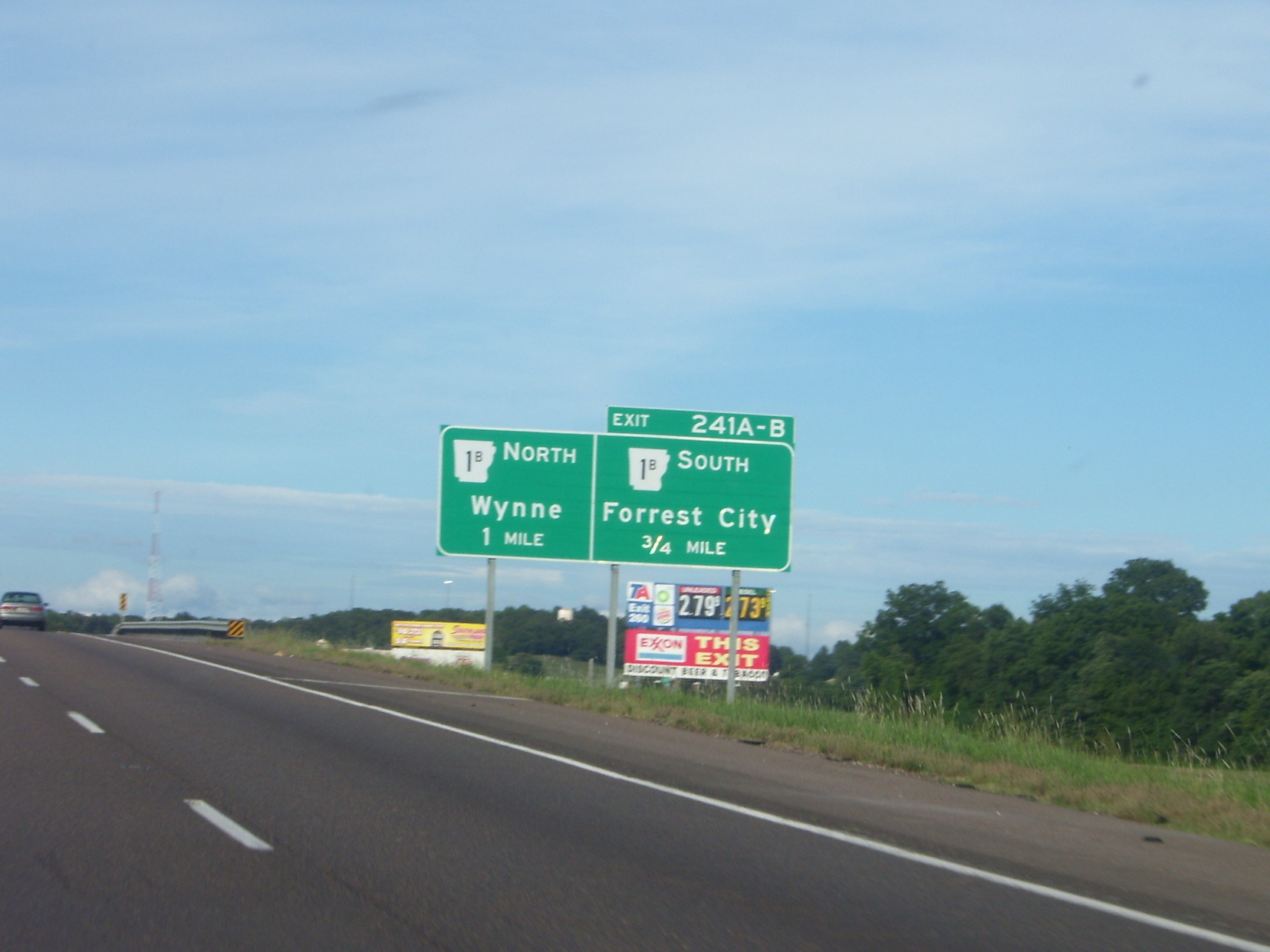
Exit for Highway 1B from I-40 in Forrest City.

Six business routes of Highway 1 currently exist, with one spur route. Each of the routes is a former alignment of Highway 1, which is common practice.

== DeWitt business route ==
Highway 1B
- Location: DeWitt
- Length: 2.13 mi (3.43 km)

Arkansas Highway 1 Business is a business route in DeWitt. It is 2.13 miles (3.43 km) in length.

Major intersections

The entire route is in DeWitt, Arkansas County.

mi	km	Destinations	Notes
0.0	0.0	US 165 / AR 1 north	Southern terminus; southern terminus of AR 1
0.5	0.80	AR 130 north (Monroe Street)	Southern terminus of AR 130
1.4	2.3	AR 152 west (West 2nd Street)	Eastern terminus of AR 152
2.2	3.5	AR 1 (Whitehead Drive)	Northern terminus
1.000 mi = 1.609 km; 1.000 km = 0.621 mi

== St. Charles spur ==
Highway 1S
- Location: St. Charles
- Length: 0.49 mi (790 m)

Arkansas Highway 1 Spur is a spur route in St. Charles. Known locally as River View Drive, the route is 0.49 miles (0.79 km) in length. The route ends at the location of the Battle of Saint Charles on the White River.

Major intersections

The entire route is in St. Charles, Arkansas County.

mi	km	Destinations	Notes
0.0	0.0	AR 1	Southern terminus
0.5	0.80	White River	Northern terminus
1.000 mi = 1.609 km; 1.000 km = 0.621 mi

== Marianna business route ==
Highway 1B
- Location: Marianna
- Length: 1.55 mi (2.49 km)

Arkansas Highway 1 Business is a business route in Marianna. It is 1.55 miles (2.49 km) in length, and two-lane undivided.

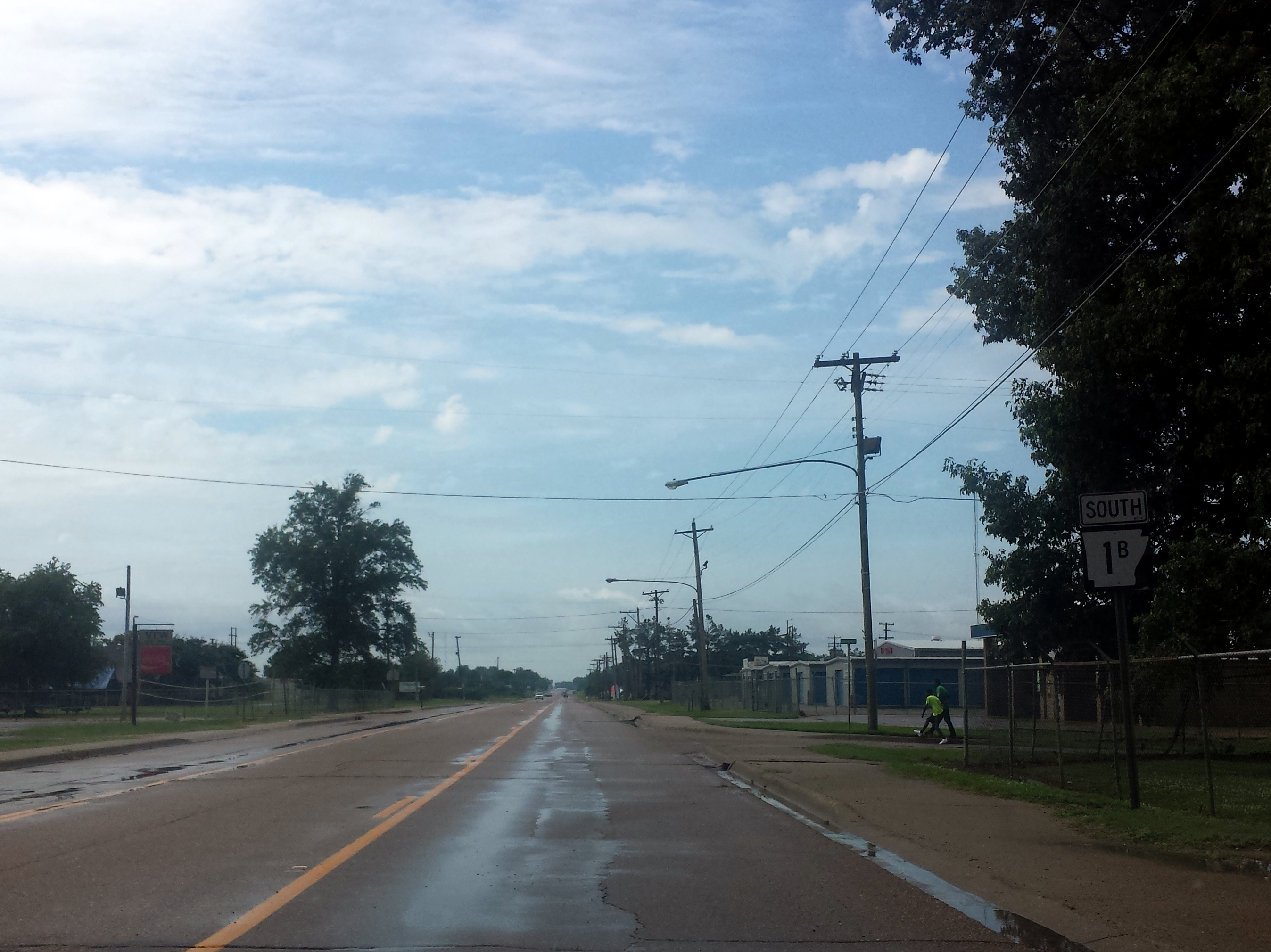

Major intersections

The entire route is in Marianna, Lee County.

mi	km	Destinations	Notes
0.0	0.0	AR 1	Southern terminus
0.74	1.19	AR 44 east (Martin Luther King Jr. Drive)	Western terminus of AR 44
1.55	2.49	US 79 / AR 1	Northern terminus
1.000 mi = 1.609 km; 1.000 km = 0.621 mi

== Forrest City business route ==
Highway 1B
- Location: Forrest City
- Length: 7.96 mi (12.81 km)

Arkansas Highway 1 Business is a business route in Forrest City. It is 7.96 miles (12.81 km) in length. The highway runs near Forrest City High School.

Major intersections

The entire route is in St. Francis County.

Location	mi	km	Destinations	Notes
	0.0	0.0	AR 1	Southern terminus
	0.3	0.48	AR 980 – Airport	
Forrest City	3.3	5.3	AR 334 south (Linden Road)	Northern terminus of AR 334
Forrest City	4.3	6.9	US 70 (Broadway Avenue)	
Forrest City	5.1	8.2	AR 284 north (Arkansas Avenue)	Southern terminus of AR 284
Forrest City	6.2	10.0	I-40	Cloverleaf interchange; exits 241A-B on I-40
Forrest City	8.1	13.0	AR 1	Northern terminus
1.000 mi = 1.609 km; 1.000 km = 0.621 mi

== Vanndale business route ==
Highway 1B
- Location: Vanndale
- Length: 1.06 mi (1.71 km)

Arkansas Highway 1 Business is a business route (formerly signed as AR 1C, a city route) in Vanndale. It is 1.06 miles (1.71 km) in length.

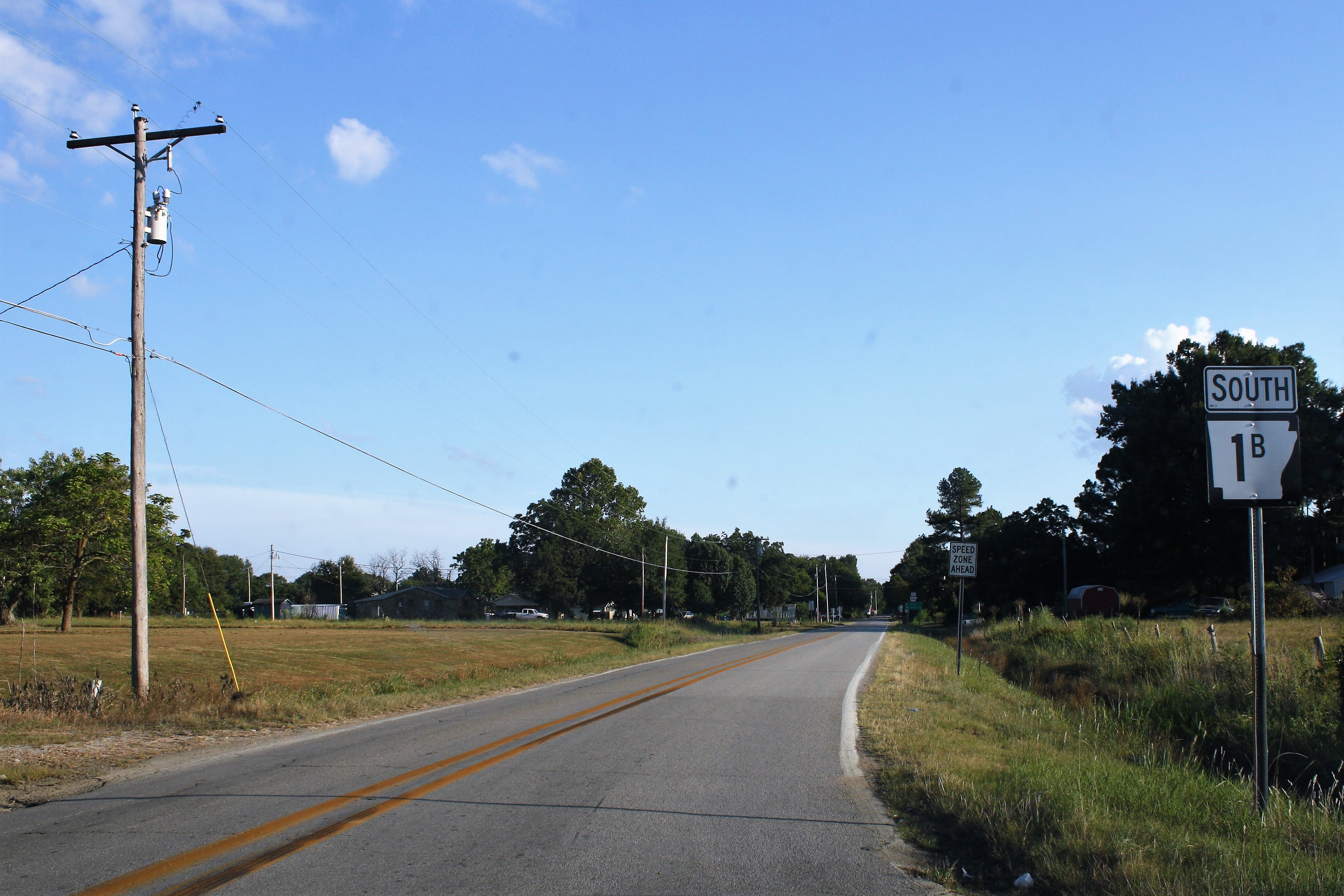
Highway 1B enters Vanndale, Arkansas

Major intersections

The entire route is in Vanndale, Cross County.

mi	km	Destinations	Notes
0.00	0.00	AR 1 / AR 364 west	Southern terminus; southern end of AR 364 concurrency
0.86	1.38	AR 364 east	Northern end of AR 364 concurrency
1.06	1.71	AR 1	Northern terminus
1.000 mi = 1.609 km; 1.000 km = 0.621 mi: Concurrency terminus

== Cherry Valley business route ==
Highway 1B
- Location: Cherry Valley
- Length: 1.10 mi (1.77 km)

Arkansas Highway 1 Business is a business route in Cherry Valley. It is 1.10 miles (1.77 km) in length.

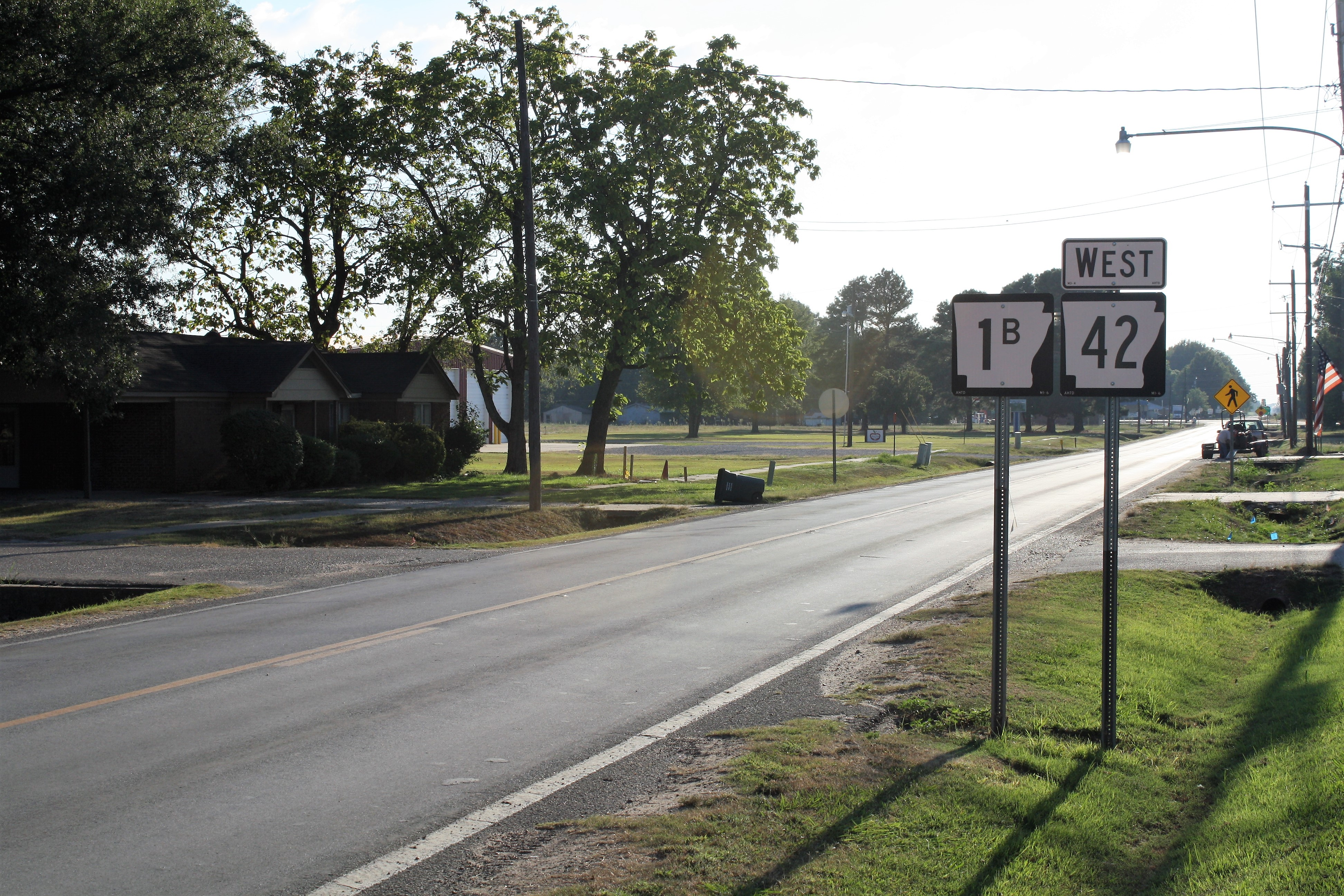
Highway 1B and Highway 42 run together in Cherry Valley

Major intersections

The entire route is in Cherry Valley, Cross County.

mi	km	Destinations	Notes
0.00	0.00	AR 1 / AR 42 west	Southern terminus; southern end of AR 42 concurrency
0.30	0.48	AR 42 east	Northern end of AR 42 concurrency
1.10	1.77	AR 1	Northern terminus
1.000 mi = 1.609 km; 1.000 km = 0.621 mi: Concurrency terminus

== Jonesboro business route ==
Highway 1B
- Location: Jonesboro
- Length: 4.03 mi (6.49 km)

Arkansas Highway 1 Business is a business route serving downtown Jonesboro. It is 4.03 miles (6.49 km) in length and known as Harrisburg Road.

Major intersections

The entire route is in Jonesboro, Craighead County.

mi	km	Destinations	Notes
0.0	0.0	AR 1 / AR 163 south – Harrisburg, Paragould	Southern terminus; northern terminus of AR 163
2.73	4.39	I-555 / US 49 (US 78) – Walnut Ridge, Trumann	Exit 44 on I-555
4.03	6.49	AR 18 – Blytheville, Waldenburg, Brinkley	Northern terminus
1.000 mi = 1.609 km; 1.000 km = 0.621 mi
