= Cross County School District =

School district in Arkansas, United States

Address
- 21 County Road 215 Cherry Valley, Arkansas, 72324; United States

District information
- Type: Public
- Grades: PreK–12
- NCES District ID: 0507740

Students and staff
- Students: 643
- Teachers: 50.17
- Staff: 42.4
- Student–teacher ratio: 12.82

Other information
- Website: www.crosscountyschools.com

Cross County School District #7 is a school district headquartered in unincorporated Cross County, Arkansas, with a Cherry Valley mailing address. It includes the municipalities of Cherry Valley and Hickory Ridge, and the unincorporated area of Vanndale.

It was established in 1965 by the merger of the Cherry Valley, Hickory Ridge, and Vanndale school districts.

== Schools ==
The District includes:

- Cross County Elementary School
- Cross County High School
