= List of Arkansas state highway business routes =

- Highway markers for AR 1B, AR 11B, and AR 102B

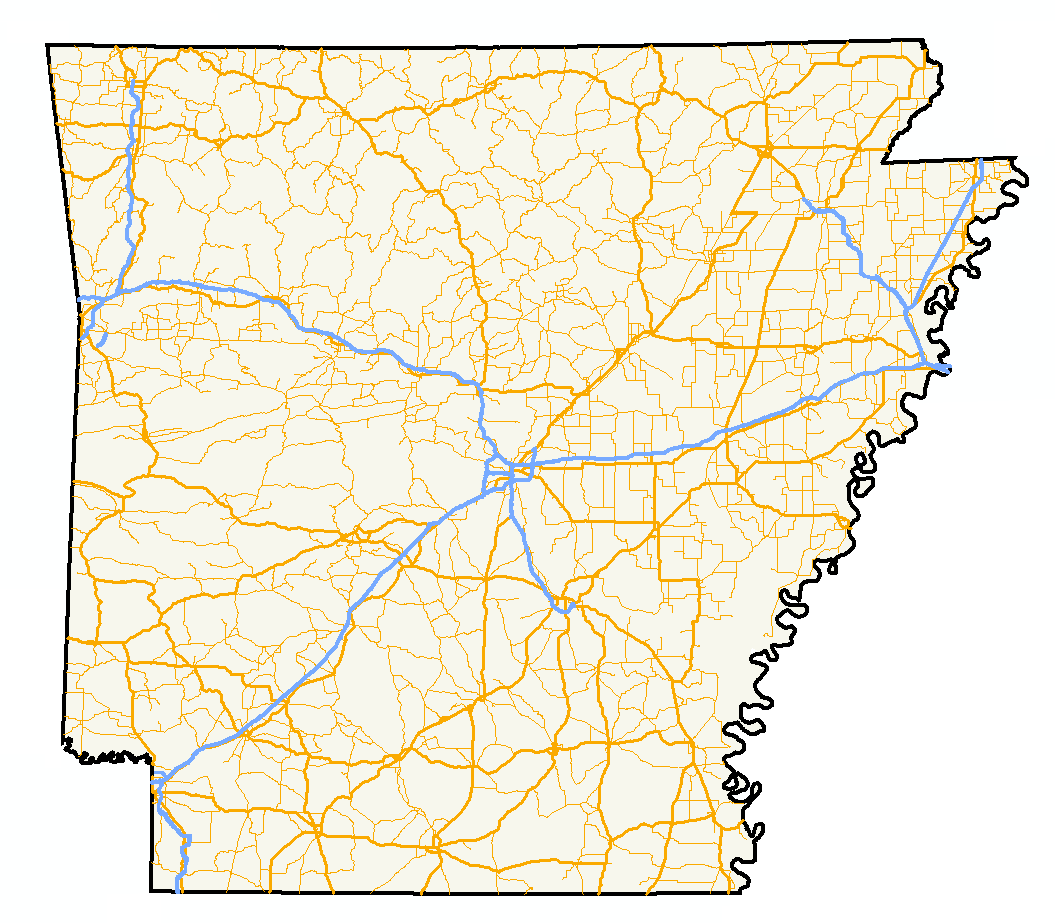
- A map of highways in the state of Arkansas

System information
- Formed: 1924

Highway names
- Interstates: Interstate nn (I-nn)
- US Highways: US Route n (US nn)
- State: Highway nn

System links
- Arkansas Highway System; Interstate; US; State; Business; Spurs; Suffixed; Scenic; Heritage

This is a list of state highway business routes in the U.S. state of Arkansas. The business routes are named after their parent highways, which leads to multiple designations of the same name in some cases. All business routes are maintained by the Arkansas Department of Transportation (ArDOT).

== Shields ==
Arkansas business route shields are mostly the same as their parent highways, with merely the addition of a "B". The major change comes from two-digit spur routes being printed on 24-by-36-inch (61 cm × 91 cm) while the parent routes are on the square 24-by-24-inch (61 cm × 61 cm) shields.

Arkansas state highway business routes are signed using standard state highway shield backgrounds. The number remains the same size and a "B" (for business) is added in an almost-exponential format. Shield sizes remain, one-digit routes keep the 24-by-24-inch (61 cm × 61 cm) shields, while two-digit routes become 24-by-36-inch (61 cm × 91 cm). Three-digit routes are the same as the parent route with the "B" placed in the available corner space. The "Business" banners are usually not used by ArDOT, which instead prefers to use only a direction banner.

Some business routes are known as "city routes", and have a "C" instead of a "B" with the same effect, thus are included herein.

== State highway business routes ==
Number	Length (mi)	Length (km)	Southern or western terminus	Northern or eastern terminus	Formed	Removed	Notes
AR 1B	2.13	3.43	AR 1 in DeWitt	AR 1 in DeWitt	—	—	
AR 1B	1.55	2.49	AR 1 in Marianna	AR 1 in Marianna	—	—	
AR 1B	7.96	12.81	AR 1 in Forrest City	AR 1 in Forrest City	—	—	
AR 1B	1.06	1.71	AR 1/AR 364 in Vanndale	AR 1 in Vanndale	—	—	
AR 1B	0.83	1.34	AR 1/AR 42 in Cherry Valley	AR 1 in Cherry Valley	—	—	
AR 1B	4.03	6.49	AR 1/AR 163/CRP in Jonesboro	AR 1/CRP in Jonesboro	—	—	
AR 1C	1.28	2.06	AR 1 in Gillett	AR 1 in Gillett	1965	1982	
AR 1B	—	—	AR 1 in Paragould	AR 1 in Paragould	1970	1979	Renumbered US 49B
AR 4B	6.1	9.8	—	—	—	—	Former AR 4
AR 4B	3.8	6.1	—	—	—	—	Former AR 4
AR 7B	5.55	8.93	—	—	—	—	
AR 9B	—	—	—	—	—	—	
AR 11B	0.74	1.19	—	—	—	—	
AR 15B	2.7	4.3	AR 8/AR 15 in Warren	AR 15/AR 189 in Warren	1997	1999	Former AR 15, renumbered US 63B
AR 15B	—	—	—	—	1999	1999	Former AR 15, renumbered US 63B
AR 18B	0.349	0.562	AR 18 in Manila	AR 77 in Manila	1962	current	Former AR 77
AR 23C	0.23	0.37	—	—	—	—	
AR 25B	5.53	8.90	—	—	—	—	
AR 27B	2.38	3.83	—	—	—	—	
AR 29B	2.82	4.54	—	—	—	—	
AR 32B	4.31	6.94	—	—	—	—	
AR 33C	3.10	4.99	—	—	—	—	
AR 41B	—	—	—	—	—	—	
AR 59B	0.94	1.51	—	—	—	—	
AR 68C	9.8	15.8	—	—	1955	1988	Former AR 68
AR 69B	2.25	3.62	—	—	—	—	
AR 69B	2.21	3.56	—	—	—	—	
AR 69B	2.88	4.63	—	—	—	—	
AR 69B	1.38	2.22	—	—	—	—	
AR 83B	2.36	3.80	—	—	—	—	
AR 94B	—	—	—	—	1975	1985	Former AR 94
AR 98B	0.94	1.51	—	—	—	—	
AR 102B	1.78	2.86	—	—	—	—	
AR 129B	2.24	3.60	—	—	—	—	
AR 308B	1.37	2.20	—	—	—	—	
Former
