= Cross County High School =

Location
- 21 County Road 215; Cherry Valley, Arkansas 72324; United States
- Coordinates: 35°24′14″N 90°48′24″W

Information
- Type: Public
- School district: Cross County School District
- Principal: Cody Goulart
- Teaching staff: 28.13 (on FTE basis)
- Grades: 9 to 12
- Enrollment: 312 (2023–2024)
- Student to teacher ratio: 11.09
- Colors: Blue and silver
- Mascot: Thunderbirds
- Website: www.crosscountyschools.com

Cross County High School is a public high school located in unincorporated Cross County, Arkansas, 2 miles (3.2 km) from Cherry Valley, and operated by the Cross County School District. The school educates 7–12th grade students.

It draws students from Cherry Valley, Hickory Ridge and Vanndale.

Cross County High School is part of the New Tech Network (NTN) schools which use Project Based Learning.
