= Hickory Ridge, Arkansas =

- City
- Location of Hickory Ridge in Cross County, Arkansas.
- Coordinates: 35°24′03″N 90°59′52″W
- Country: United States
- State: Arkansas
- County: Cross
- Incorporated: November 7, 1949

Area
  - Total: 0.65 sq mi (1.68 km^{2})
  - Land: 0.65 sq mi (1.68 km^{2})
  - Water: 0 sq mi (0.00 km^{2})
- Elevation: 230 ft (70 m)

Population (2020)
  - Total: 228
  - Estimate (2025): 222 ▼
  - Density: 352.1/sq mi (135.94/km^{2})
- Time zone: UTC-6 (Central (CST))
  - Summer (DST): UTC-5 (CDT)
- ZIP code: 72347
- Area code: 870
- FIPS code: 05-31900
- GNIS feature ID: 2404695

Hickory Ridge is a city in Cross County, Arkansas, United States. As of the 2020 census, Hickory Ridge had a population of 228. Always a small farming community with an economy based on agriculture, a post office was first established in 1875, but the community did not incorporate until 1949.

== History ==
A post office in Brushy Lake Township was named Hickory Ridge on October 5, 1875. The post office was closed shortly thereafter, and the area remained very sparsely populated because the soils were too wet to grow cotton. Following the Cotton Belt railway extension through the settlement around 1882, the community saw prosperity from timber and agriculture; reestablishing the Hickory Ridge post office in 1892.

The city was racially segregated along the railroad tracks (similar to the Delmar Divide), and around 1910, white residents dynamited the black section of town, expelling all black residents. The city became completely white and evolved into sundown town through unwritten rules.

== Geography ==
Hickory Ridge is located in northwestern Cross County. U.S. Route 49 passes through the community, leading north 37 miles (60 km) to Jonesboro and south 35 miles (56 km) to Interstate 40 at Brinkley.

According to the United States Census Bureau, Hickory Ridge has a total area of 0.66 square miles (1.7 km^{2}), all land.

Hickory Ridge is within the Mississippi embayment of the Mississippi Alluvial Plain, a flat fertile floodplain of the Mississippi River. In Arkansas, an economic and cultural region roughly following this geography is known as the Arkansas Delta (or "the Delta"). Roughly the western third of Cross County is within the Western Lowlands Pleistocene Valley Train subregion of the Delta. This region is characterized as flat windblown deposits of silty, sandy soils, and loess with a high groundwater table. Post oak and loblolly pine are native in the higher elevations, with overcup oak, water hickory, willow oak, and pin oak and pondberry native in wetlands. Today, row agriculture is extensive (mostly soybeans and cotton), with commercial aquaculture (crawfish, baitfish, and catfish farms) also common.

== Demographics ==
Historical population
Census	Pop.	Note	%±
1950	345		—
1960	364		5.5%
1970	410		12.6%
1980	478		16.6%
1990	436		−8.8%
2000	384		−11.9%
2010	272		−29.2%
2020	228		−16.2%
2025 (est.)	222	▼	−2.6%
U.S. Decennial Census

At the 2000 census, there were 384 people, 155 households and 110 families residing in the city. The population density was 599.6 inhabitants per square mile (231.5/km^{2}). There were 165 housing units at an average density of 257.7 per square mile (99.5/km^{2}). The racial makeup of the city was 99.48% White, 0.26% Asian, and 0.26% from two or more races. 0.26% of the population were Hispanic or Latino of any race.

There were 155 households, of which 32.3% had children under the age of 18 living with them, 54.2% were married couples living together, 13.5% had a female householder with no husband present, and 28.4% were non-families. 25.2% of all households were made up of individuals, and 12.3% had someone living alone who was 65 years of age or older. The average household size was 2.48 and the average family size was 3.01.

Age distribution was 28.4% under the age of 18, 9.9% from 18 to 24, 26.3% from 25 to 44, 21.6% from 45 to 64, and 13.8% who were 65 years of age or older. The median age was 35 years. For every 100 females, there were 92.0 males. For every 100 females age 18 and over, there were 87.1 males.

The median household income was $22,778, and the median family income was $28,906. Males had a median income of $27,500 versus $15,750 for females. The per capita income for the city was $13,053. About 11.2% of families and 12.8% of the population were below the poverty line, including 10.5% of those under age 18 and 29.3% of those age 65 or over.

== Education ==
Public education for elementary and secondary students is provided by the Cross County School District, which leads to graduation from Cross County High School. The district's mascot and athletic emblem is the Thunderbird.

The Cross County district was established in 1965 by the merger of the Cherry Valley, Hickory Ridge, and Vanndale school districts. As a part of the Cross County district the community previously had its own elementary school, Hickory Ridge Elementary.

== Infrastructure ==
=== Transportation ===
Hickory Ridge is located at the intersection of U.S. Route 49 (US 49) and Highway 42. The Union Pacific Railway closely parallels US 49 through Hickory Ridge.

=== Utilities ===
Entergy Arkansas is the sole provider of electricity in Hickory Ridge. Telephone communication service is provided by AT&T, cable television is provided by East Arkansas Video. Centerpoint Energy is the natural gas utility in Cross County.

The Arkansas Department of Health (ADH) is responsible for the regulation and oversight of public water systems throughout the state. Hickory Ridge Waterworks is a small water utility that treats and distributes groundwater to under 1000 customers.

== See also ==
- List of sundown towns in the United States
