= Levesque, Arkansas =

- Unincorporated community
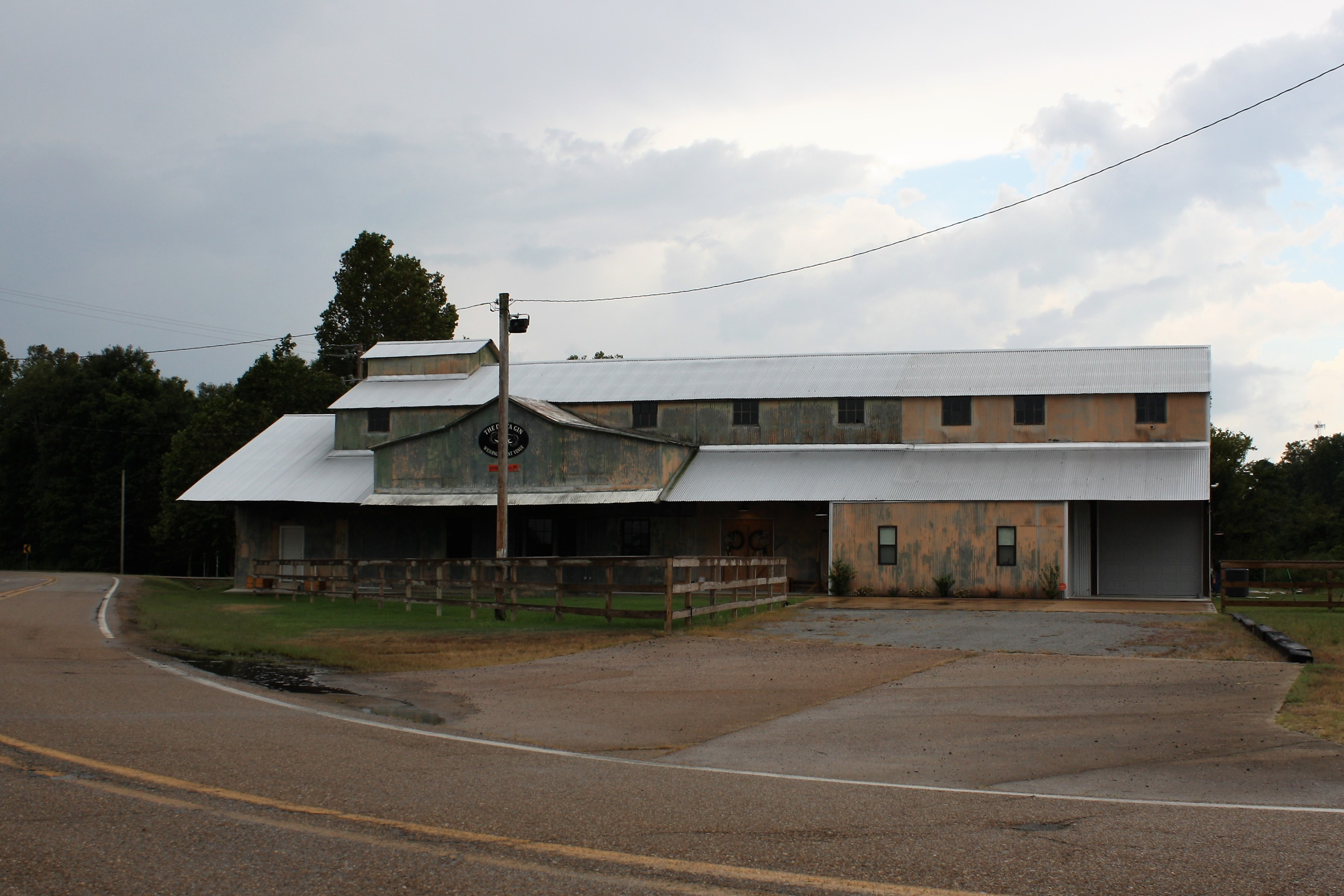
- Delta Gin at Levesque

- Location within Arkansas Location within the United States
- Coordinates: 35°14′57″N 90°42′38″W
- Country: United States
- State: Arkansas
- County: Cross
- Elevation: 230 ft (70 m)
- Time zone: UTC-6 (Central (CST))
  - Summer (DST): UTC-5 (CDT)
- Area code: 870
- GNIS feature ID: 77480

Levesque is an unincorporated community in Cross County, Arkansas, United States. Levesque is located at the junction of U.S. Route 64 and Arkansas Highway 163, 4.6 miles (7.4 km) east-northeast of Wynne.

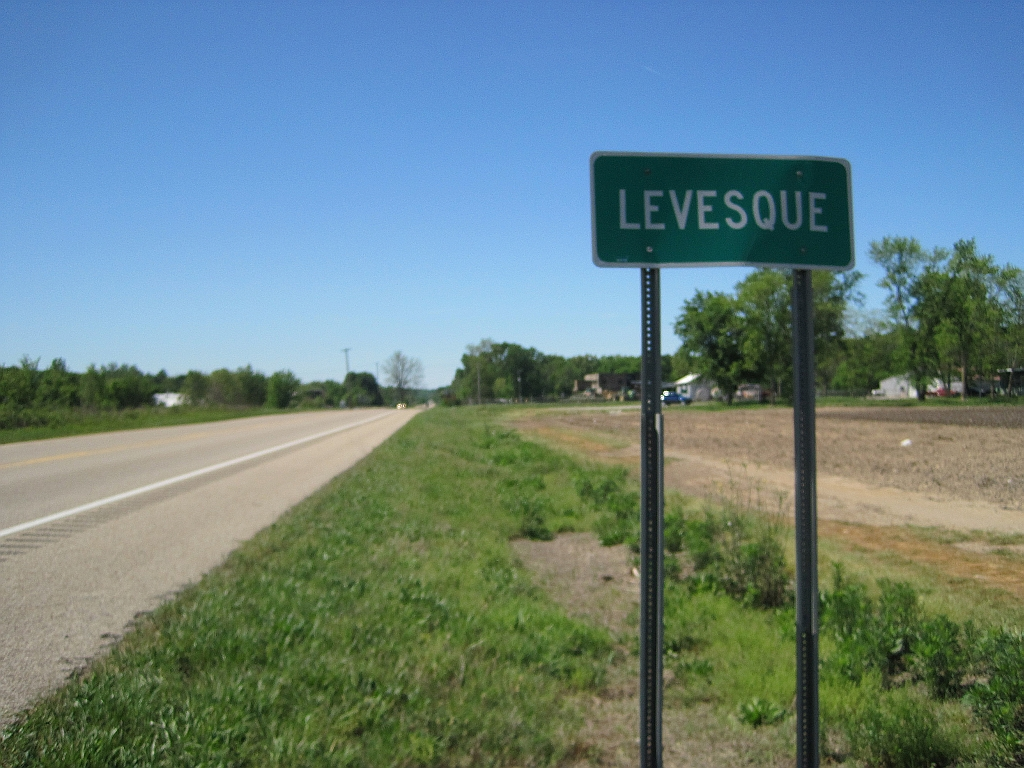
