= Vanndale, Arkansas =

- Census-designated place
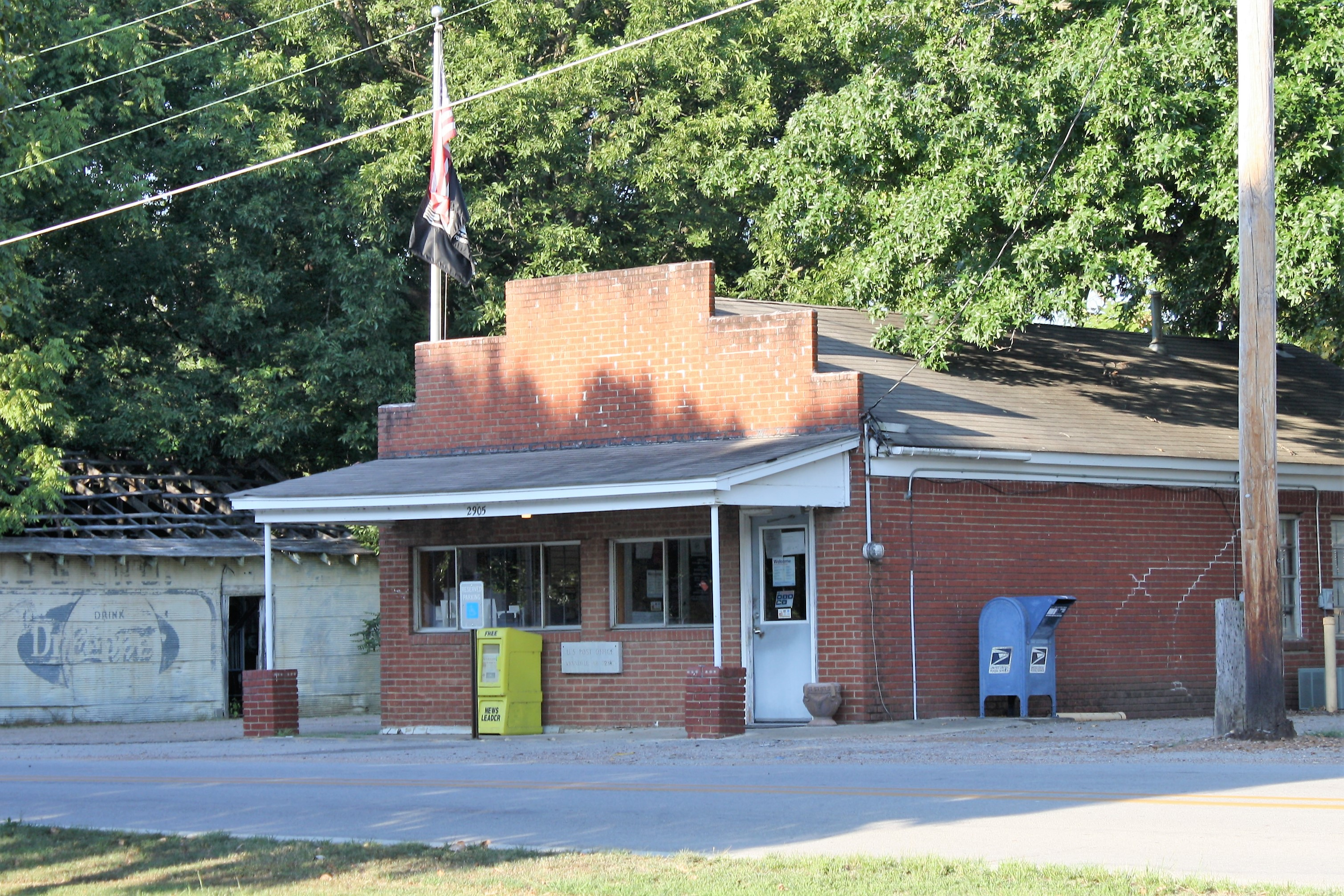
- Vanndale post office

- Vanndale's position in Arkansas Vanndale, Arkansas (the United States)
- Coordinates: 35°18′55″N 90°46′16″W
- Country: United States
- State: Arkansas
- County: Cross
- Township: Searcy
- Elevation: 272 ft (83 m)

Population (2020)
  - Total: 339
- Time zone: UTC-6 (Central (CST))
  - Summer (DST): UTC-5 (CDT)
- ZIP code: 72387
- Area code: 870
- GNIS feature ID: 2805691

Vanndale (formerly Oak Grove) is an unincorporated community and census-designated place (CDP) in Searcy Township, Cross County, Arkansas, United States. It was first listed as a CDP in the 2020 census with a population of 339. Vanndale was the county seat of Cross County from 1886 until 1903, when it was moved to the booming railroad town of Wynne. The community was named for John W. Vann, postmaster. Vanndale was formerly on Highway 1, but has now been bypassed and is on Highway 1B.

== Education ==
Public education for elementary and secondary students is provided by the Cross County School District, which leads to graduation from Cross County High School. The district's mascot and athletic emblem is the Thunderbird.

The Cross County district was established in 1965 by the merger of the Cherry Valley, Hickory Ridge, and Vanndale school districts. As a part of the Cross County district the community previously had its own elementary school, Vanndale Elementary.

== Demographics ==
Historical population
Census	Pop.	Note	%±
2020	339		—
U.S. Decennial Census; 2020

=== 2020 census ===
Vanndale CDP, Arkansas – Demographic Profile (NH = Non-Hispanic) Note: the US Census treats Hispanic/Latino as an ethnic category. This table excludes Latinos from the racial categories and assigns them to a separate category. Hispanics/Latinos may be of any race.
Race / Ethnicity	Pop 2020	% 2020
White alone (NH)	290	85.55%
Black or African American alone (NH)	24	7.08%
Native American or Alaska Native alone (NH)	0	0.00%
Asian alone (NH)	1	0.29%
Pacific Islander alone (NH)	0	0.00%
Some Other Race alone (NH)	0	0.00%
Mixed Race/Multi-Racial (NH)	19	5.60%
Hispanic or Latino (any race)	5	1.47%
Total	339	100.00%

== Notable people ==
- C. Vann Woodward, American historian who focused primarily on the American South and race relations, born in Vanndale
