= Cherry Valley, Arkansas =

- City
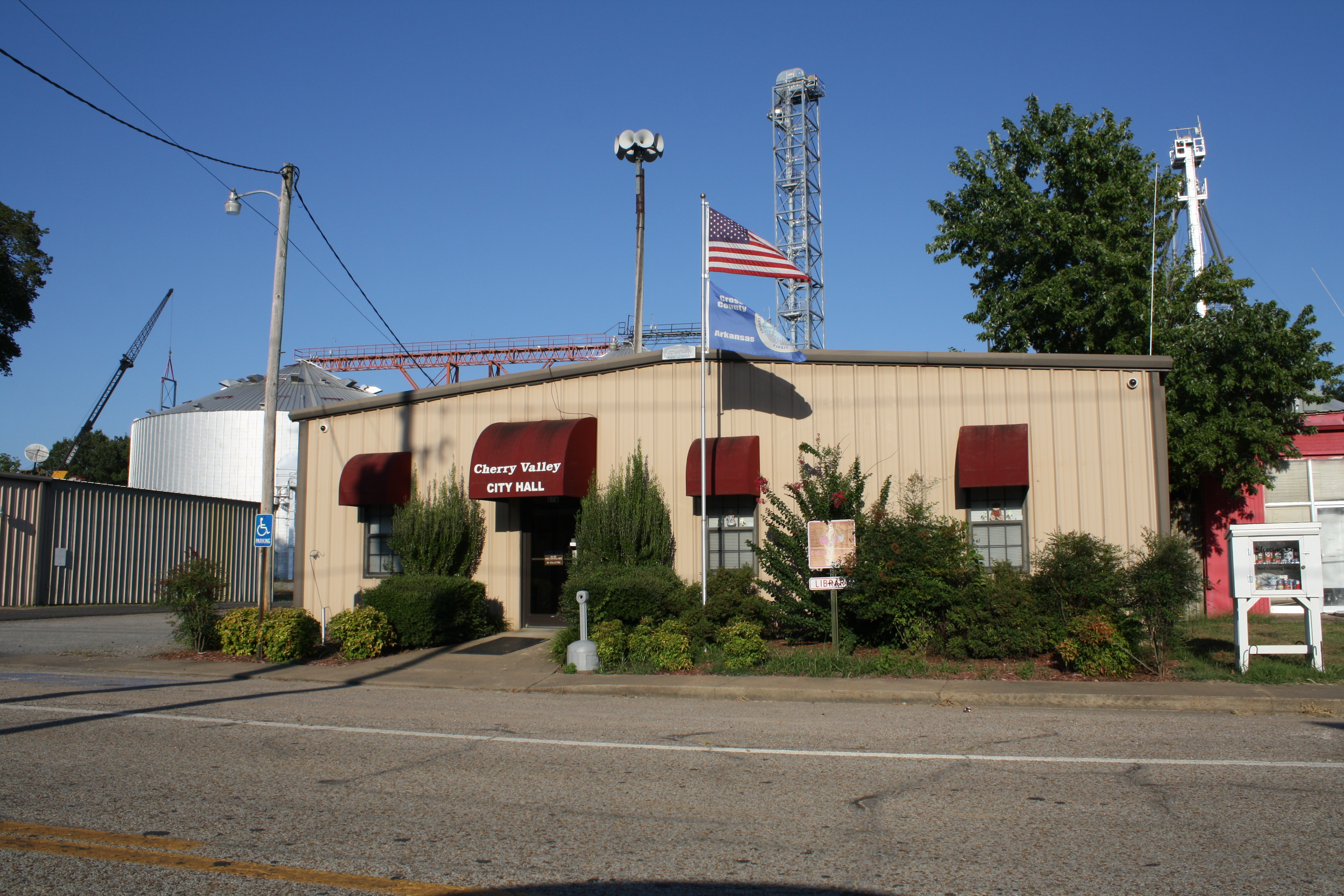
- City Hall and Library

- Location of Cherry Valley in Cross County, Arkansas.
- Coordinates: 35°24′07″N 90°45′02″W
- Country: United States
- State: Arkansas
- County: Cross
- First Settled: 1882
- Incorporated: August 6, 1910

Area
  - Total: 0.76 sq mi (1.98 km^{2})
  - Land: 0.76 sq mi (1.98 km^{2})
  - Water: 0 sq mi (0.00 km^{2})
- Elevation: 279 ft (85 m)

Population (2020)
  - Total: 575
  - Estimate (2025): 589 ▲
  - Density: 750.7/sq mi (289.86/km^{2})
- Time zone: UTC-6 (Central (CST))
  - Summer (DST): UTC-5 (CDT)
- ZIP code: 72324
- Area code: 870
- FIPS code: 05-13540
- GNIS feature ID: 2404039
- Website: cherryvalleyar.gov

Cherry Valley is a city in Cross County, Arkansas, United States. The population was 702 at the 2020 census.

== History ==
Cherry Valley was started in 1882, when upon the completion of the Helena & Iron Mountain Railway through Cross County, local resident G.W. Stacy constructed a hotel at a site on the line adjacent to a grove of Cherry trees. The town was incorporated on August 6, 1910.

== Geography ==
Cherry Valley is located in northern Cross County at the western edge of Crowleys Ridge. Arkansas Highway 1 leads south 13 miles (21 km) to Wynne, the county seat, and north 11 miles (18 km) to Harrisburg.

According to the United States Census Bureau, the city has a total area of 0.85 square miles (2.2 km^{2}), all land.

== Demographics ==
=== Population and Homeownership ===
As of 2021, Cherry Valley had a population of 618 people, a 12% decrease since 2020, and 218 households. The median household income was $42,500 and the median property value was $65,300. The homeownership rate was 68.3%, while 77.2% of homeowners have a mortgage. 11.8% of the population lived under the poverty line, most of whom being white females between the ages of 55 and 64.

2021 Demographic Results
Race and Ethnicity	Pop. 2021	% of Pop.
White (NH)	485	78.5%
Multiracial (NH)	90	14.6%
Black or African American (NH)	30	4.85%
Multiracial (H)	6	0.971%
White (H)	4	0.647%
Other (H)	3	0.485%

=== Transportation ===
The average household owned 2 cars, while 74.6% of inhabitants drove alone. 23.1% of the population carpooled, and the rest (1.52%) walked. The average commute time was 29 minutes.

=== Healthcare ===
19.9% of people were uninsured. 35.1% of people were under Medicaid, 26.1% were under employer coverage, 11% were under Medicare, 7.12% were under an individual policy, and 0.809% were using VA healthcare.

== Education ==
Public education for elementary and secondary students is provided by the Cross County School District, which includes Cross County High School.

The Cross County district was established in 1965 by the merger of the Cherry Valley, Hickory Ridge, and Vanndale school districts. As a part of the Cross County district the community previously had its own elementary school, Cherry Valley Elementary.

== Notable people ==
- Pat Hare, blues musician
- Jeff Martin, professional basketball player
- Wayne Martin, professional football player
- Paul H. Young, fly fishing innovator
