= Hill Hotel =

Hill Hotel may refer to:

- Hill Hotel (Omaha, Nebraska)
- Hill Hotel (Portland, Oregon)

== See also ==
- Taylor Hill Hotel, Coal Hill, Arkansas, listed on the NRHP in Johnson County, Arkansas
