= Voorhees School =

- U.S. National Register of Historic Places
- Location within Arkansas Location within the United States
- Location: 415 N College Ave., Clarksville, Arkansas
- Coordinates: 35°28′34″N 93°27′59″W
- Area: less than one acre
- Built: 1940
- Built by: National Youth Administration
- NRHP reference No.: 100002948
- Added to NRHP: September 11, 2018

The Voorhees School is a historic school building at 415 North College Avenue in Clarksville, Arkansas. It is a single-story masonry structure, built out of native stone and covered by a gable-on-hip roof. The main facade is characterized by bands of sash windows, with two arched building entrances. The school was built in 1940–41 with funding from the National Youth Administration, a New Deal works and education program. It was first used as a training school for teachers, and then as a military training facility during World War II. In 1946 it became the main building of Arkansas's first pharmacy school, as part of the University of the Ozarks. It has since performed a variety of functions for the university.

The building was listed on the National Register of Historic Places in 2018.

== See also ==
- National Register of Historic Places listings in Johnson County, Arkansas
