= Clarksville Commercial Historic District =

Historic district in Arkansas, United States

- U.S. National Register of Historic Places
- U.S. Historic district
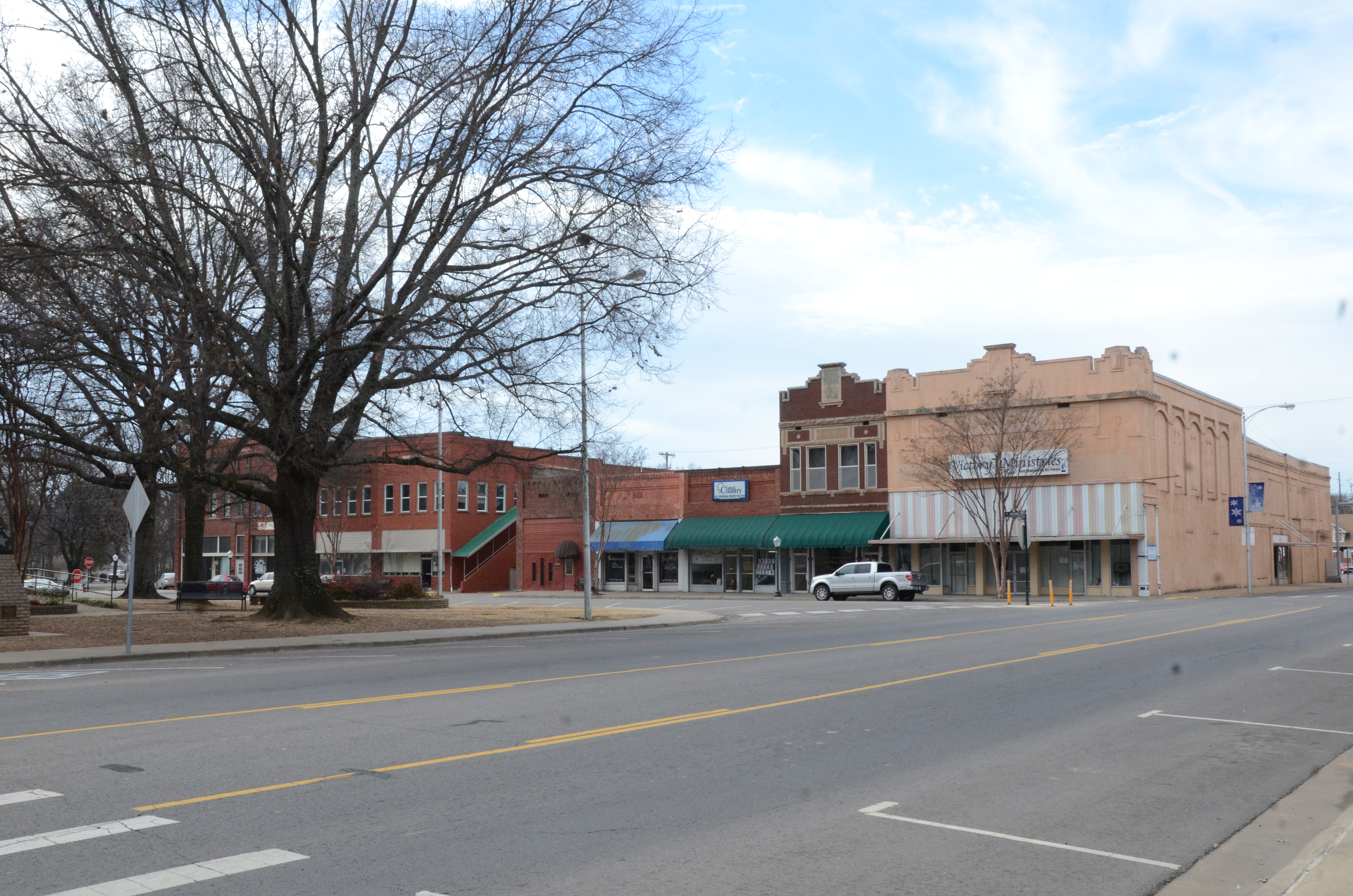

- Location within Arkansas Location within the United States
- Location: Roughly bounded by McConnell St. on the S.; Cherry St. on the N.; Johnson St. on the W.; Spadra Creek on the E., Clarksville, Arkansas
- Coordinates: 35°28′16″N 93°27′59″W
- Area: 0 acres (0 ha)
- Built: 1935
- Architect: Simon, Louis A.; Harralson and Nelson
- Architectural style: Early Commercial, Classical Revival, Mediterranean Revival
- NRHP reference No.: 08000816
- Added to NRHP: March 30, 2009

The Clarksville Commercial Historic District encompasses the historic commercial heart of downtown Clarksville, Arkansas. The district extends along Main Street (United States Route 64), from Johnson Street to Union Street, and includes adjacent properties on adjacent cross streets. Although Clarksville was founded in 1836, its downtown area saw its most significant economic development between 1883 and 1958, and it is this era that is reflected in its architecture.

The district was listed on the National Register of Historic Places in 2009. Two properties in the district are also individually listed: the Johnson County Courthouse, and the former station of the Missouri-Pacific Railroad.

== See also ==
- National Register of Historic Places listings in Johnson County, Arkansas
