= National Register of Historic Places listings in Johnson County, Arkansas =

Location of Johnson County in Arkansas

This is a list of the National Register of Historic Places listings in Johnson County, Arkansas.

This is intended to be a complete list of the properties on the National Register of Historic Places in Johnson County, Arkansas, United States. The locations of National Register properties for which the latitude and longitude coordinates are included below, may be seen in a map.

There are 35 properties listed on the National Register in the county.

Contents: Counties in Arkansas
- Arkansas
- Ashley
- Baxter
- Benton
- Boone
- Bradley
- Calhoun
- Carroll
- Chicot
- Clark
- Clay
- Cleburne
- Cleveland
- Columbia
- Conway
- Craighead
- Crawford
- Crittenden
- Cross
- Dallas
- Desha
- Drew
- Faulkner
- Franklin
- Fulton
- Garland
- Grant
- Greene
- Hempstead
- Hot Spring
- Howard
- Independence
- Izard
- Jackson
- Jefferson
- Johnson
- Lafayette
- Lawrence
- Lee
- Lincoln
- Little River
- Logan
- Lonoke
- Madison
- Marion
- Miller
- Mississippi
- Monroe
- Montgomery
- Nevada
- Newton
- Ouachita
- Perry
- Phillips
- Pike
- Poinsett
- Polk
- Pope
- Prairie
- Pulaski (Little Rock)
- Randolph
- St. Francis
- Saline
- Scott
- Searcy
- Sebastian
- Sevier
- Sharp
- Stone
- Union
- Van Buren
- Washington
- White
- Woodruff
- Yell

This National Park Service list is complete through NPS recent listings posted May 1, 2026.

== Current listings ==
	Name on the Register	Image	Date listed	Location	City or town	Description
1	Big Piney Creek Bridge	Big Piney Creek Bridge	April 9, 1990 (#90000506)	Highway 123 over Big Piney Creek; 35°40′37″N 93°14′10″W	Hagarville	
2	Bunch-Walton Post #22 American Legion Hut	Bunch-Walton Post #22 American Legion Hut	January 24, 2007 (#06001269)	201 Legion St. 35°28′17″N 93°27′29″W	Clarksville	
3	Cabin Creek Bridge		January 24, 2023 (#100008562)	Red Oak Rd. over Cabin Cr. 35°25′12″N 93°23′41″W	Lamar vicinity	
4	Clarksville Commercial Historic District	Clarksville Commercial Historic District	March 30, 2009 (#08000816)	Roughly bounded by McConnell Street on the south, Cherry Street on the north, Johnson Street on the west, and Spadra Creek on the east 35°28′16″N 93°27′59″W	Clarksville	
5	Clarksville Confederate Monument	Clarksville Confederate Monument	June 25, 1999 (#99000709)	Oakland Memorial Cemetery, west of Montgomery Ave. 35°28′04″N 93°28′39″W	Clarksville	
6	Clarksville High School Building No. 1		September 10, 1992 (#92001202)	Main St. 35°28′17″N 93°28′20″W	Clarksville	Demolished
7	Clarksville National Guard Armory	Clarksville National Guard Armory	January 24, 2007 (#06001270)	309 College St. 35°28′27″N 93°28′00″W	Clarksville	
8	College Street Bridge		January 16, 2026 (#100012573)	College Street 275 feet (84 m) east of Privett Road; 35°26′03″N 93°41′07″W	Coal Hill vicinity	
9	Davis House	Davis House	December 22, 1982 (#82000854)	212 Fulton St. 35°28′01″N 93°27′57″W	Clarksville	
10	N.E. Dickerson Store	N.E. Dickerson Store	September 22, 1995 (#95001124)	East of Highway 215; 35°41′21″N 93°34′23″W	Oark	
11	Dover to Clarksville Road-Hickeytown Road Segment	Dover to Clarksville Road-Hickeytown Road Segment	May 26, 2005 (#05000464)	Hickeytown Rd., east of U.S. Route 64; 35°26′06″N 93°22′53″W	Lamar	
12	Dunlap House	Dunlap House	December 22, 1982 (#82000855)	101 Grandview; 35°28′15″N 93°27′37″W	Clarksville	
13	First Presbyterian Church	First Presbyterian Church	May 13, 1991 (#91000588)	212 College Ave. 35°28′21″N 93°27′57″W	Clarksville	
14	Harmony Presbyterian Church	Harmony Presbyterian Church	December 1, 1994 (#94001411)	Northern side of Highway 103, approximately 8 miles north of Clarksville; 35°33′02″N 93°34′13″W	Harmony	
15	Taylor Hill Hotel	Taylor Hill Hotel	October 21, 2008 (#08001007)	409 Alabama St. 35°26′11″N 93°40′15″W	Coal Hill	
16	Johnson County Courthouse	Johnson County Courthouse	June 14, 1991 (#91000680)	Junction of Main and Fulton Sts. 35°28′15″N 93°27′53″W	Clarksville	
17	King's Canyon Petroglyphs		May 4, 1982 (#82002119)	Address Restricted	Clarksville	
18	MacLean Hall	MacLean Hall	June 5, 2017 (#100001008)	415 N. College Ave. 35°28′33″N 93°27′59″W	Clarksville	Residence hall at the University of the Ozarks.
19	Edward Taylor McConnell House	Edward Taylor McConnell House	May 10, 2001 (#01000485)	302 S. Fulton St. 35°28′09″N 93°27′57″W	Clarksville	
20	McKennon House	McKennon House	December 22, 1982 (#82000856)	115 Grandview; 35°28′12″N 93°27′37″W	Clarksville	
21	Capt. Archibald S. McKennon House	Capt. Archibald S. McKennon House	January 2, 1976 (#76000424)	215 N. Central; 35°28′22″N 93°27′55″W	Clarksville	
22	Missouri-Pacific Depot-Clarksville	Missouri-Pacific Depot-Clarksville	June 11, 1992 (#92000604)	West of College St. between Cherry and Main Sts. 35°28′18″N 93°28′07″W	Clarksville	
23	Munger House	Munger House	November 8, 1996 (#96001174)	West of County Road 416, approximately ¾ mile north of the Pope County line 35°28′35″N 93°15′02″W	Lutherville	
24	Raymond Munger Memorial Chapel-University of the Ozarks	Raymond Munger Memorial Chapel-University of the Ozarks	June 8, 1993 (#93000489)	West of Highway 103 on the University of the Ozarks campus 35°28′38″N 93°28′03″W	Clarksville	
25	Oark School-Methodist Church		September 29, 1995 (#95001142)	Junction of Highway 215 and County Road 34; 35°41′28″N 93°34′16″W	Oark	
26	Ozone School	Ozone School	January 27, 2015 (#14001200)	14137 AR 21; 35°37′51″N 93°26′34″W	Ozone	
27	Pennington House	Pennington House	December 1, 1994 (#94001416)	317 Johnson St. 35°28′23″N 93°28′09″W	Clarksville	
28	Pioneer House	Pioneer House	March 31, 1995 (#95000363)	Poplar St. (U.S. Highway 64), south of Highway 123 and west of the Johnson County Hospital; 35°27′47″N 93°26′47″W	Clarksville	
29	St. Paul Lutheran School	St. Paul Lutheran School	March 5, 1999 (#99000228)	County Road 418; 35°28′44″N 93°16′52″W	Lamar	
30	Serpent Cave		May 4, 1982 (#82002120)	Address Restricted	Clarksville	
31	Fremont Stokes House	Fremont Stokes House	June 4, 2008 (#08000488)	319 Grandview Ave. 35°27′58″N 93°27′47″W	Clarksville	
32	Tankersley-Stewart House		May 19, 1994 (#94000464)	East of County Road 27 and north of Highway 352; 35°29′26″N 93°36′36″W	Hunt	Demolished.
33	Union School	Union School	January 24, 2011 (#10001150)	North side of County Road 4670, west of Little Piney Creek; 35°38′04″N 93°19′43″W	Hagarville vicinity	Public Schools in the Ozarks MPS; two-room, wood frame schoolhouse erected in 1929; also used as a Masonic Lodge, church and community center
34	U.S. 64 Horsehead Creek Bridge	U.S. 64 Horsehead Creek Bridge	September 29, 2014 (#14000792)	US 64 over Horsehead Cr. 35°26′06″N 93°36′22″W	Hartman	
35	Voorhees School		September 11, 2018 (#100002948)	415 N College Ave. 35°28′34″N 93°27′59″W	Clarksville	

== Former listings ==
	Name on the Register	Image	Date listed	Date removed	Location	City or town	Description
1	Science Hall, University of the Ozarks		January 21, 1993 (#92001830)	May 15, 2003	University of the Ozarks campus, W of AR 103	Clarksville	Demolished in 2002.

== See also ==
- List of National Historic Landmarks in Arkansas
- National Register of Historic Places listings in Arkansas
