= Davis House (Clarksville, Arkansas) =

Historic house in Arkansas, United States

- U.S. National Register of Historic Places
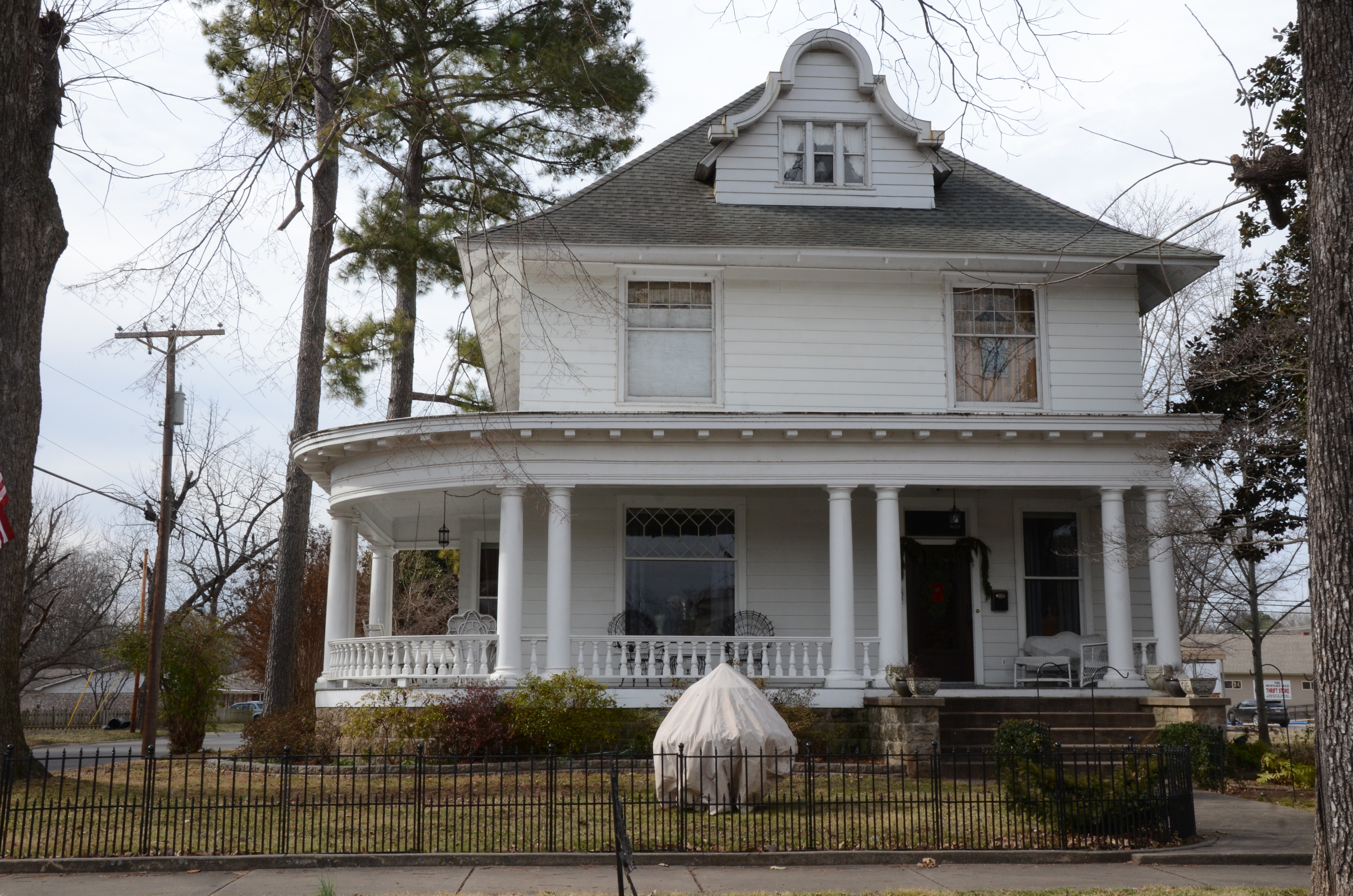

- Location within Arkansas Location within the United States
- Location: 212 Fulton St., Clarksville, Arkansas
- Coordinates: 35°28′1″N 93°27′57″W
- Area: less than one acre
- Built: 1905
- Architect: Charles L. Thompson
- Architectural style: Colonial Revival
- MPS: Thompson, Charles L., Design Collection TR
- NRHP reference No.: 82000854
- Added to NRHP: December 22, 1982

The Davis House is a historic house at 212 Fulton Street in Clarksville, Arkansas. It is a 2 1/2-story wood-frame American Foursquare structure, with a hip roof, weatherboard siding, and a foundation of rusticated concrete blocks. The roof has flared eaves with exposed rafter ends, and a front-facing dormer with a Flemish-style gable. The porch extends across the front and curves around to the side, supported by Tuscan columns. The house was built about 1905 to a design by noted Arkansas architect Charles L. Thompson.

The house was listed on the National Register of Historic Places in 1982.

== See also ==
- National Register of Historic Places listings in Johnson County, Arkansas
