= Pennington House =

Pennington House may refer to:

- Pennington House (Clarksville, Arkansas)
- S.A. Pennington House, Elton, Louisiana
- Pennington Cottage, Deer Park, Maryland
- John Pennington–Henry Ford House, Macon, Michigan
- Sarah Pennington House, Petoskey, Michigan
- Governor John L. Pennington House, Yankton, South Dakota
