= Dunlap House (Clarksville, Arkansas) =

Historic house in Arkansas, United States

- U.S. National Register of Historic Places
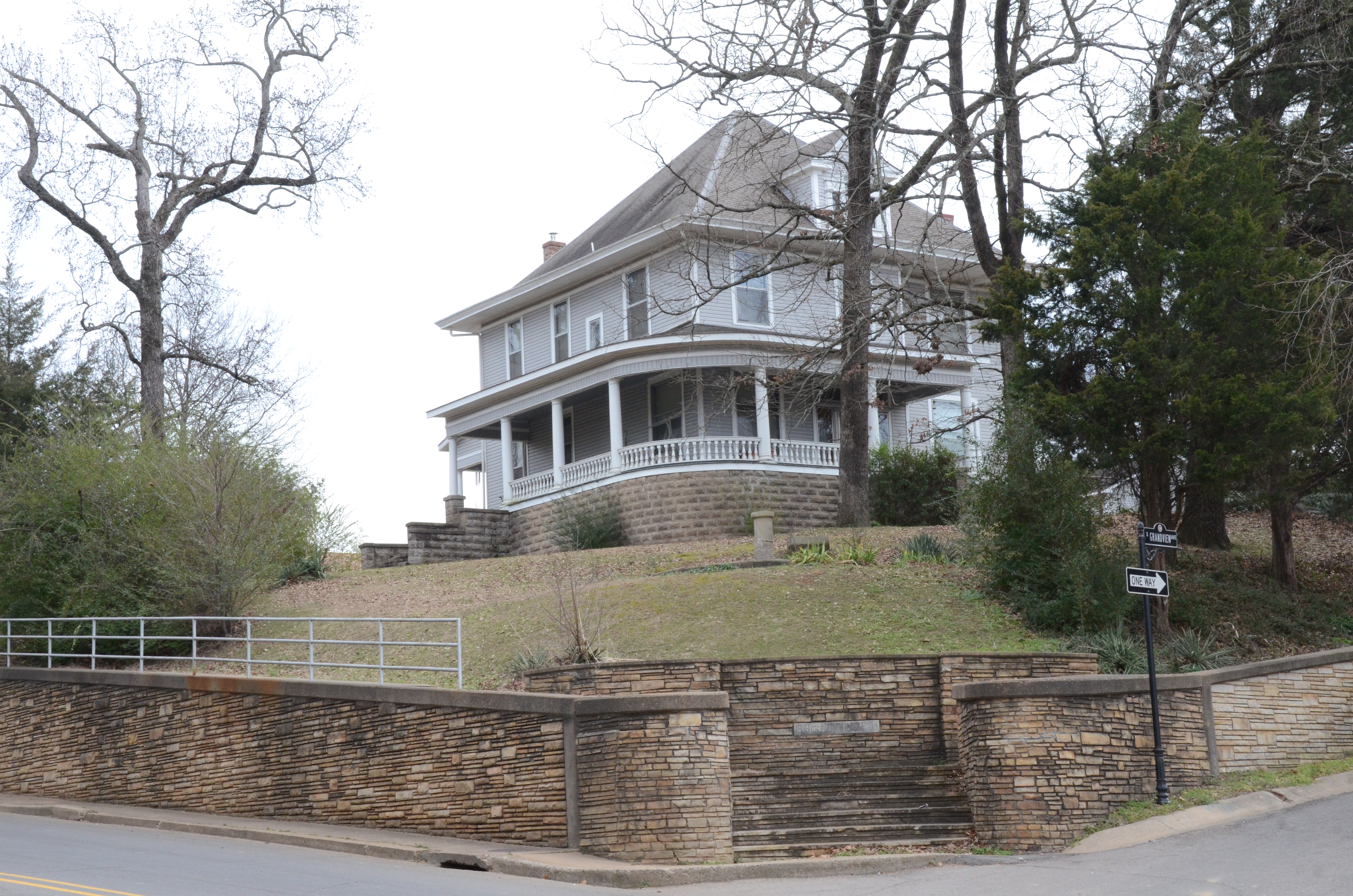

- Location within Arkansas Location within the United States
- Location: 101 Grandview, Clarksville, Arkansas
- Coordinates: 35°28′15″N 93°27′37″W
- Built: 1910
- Architect: Charles L. Thompson
- Architectural style: Colonial Revival
- MPS: Charles L. Thompson, Design Collection TR
- NRHP reference No.: 82000855
- Added to NRHP: December 22, 1982

The Dunlap House is a historic house at 101 Grandview Avenue in Clarksville, Arkansas. It is a two-story wood frame American Foursquare structure, set on a tall stone foundation on a highly visible lot near the city center. Its porch, uncharacteristic for the Foursquare style, extends only across half the front, and curves around to the left side; it is supported by Tuscan columns. The house was built about 1910 to a design by noted Arkansas architect Charles L. Thompson.

The house was listed on the National Register of Historic Places in 1982.

== See also ==
- National Register of Historic Places listings in Johnson County, Arkansas
