= Capt. Archibald S. McKennon House =

Historic house in Arkansas, United States

- U.S. National Register of Historic Places
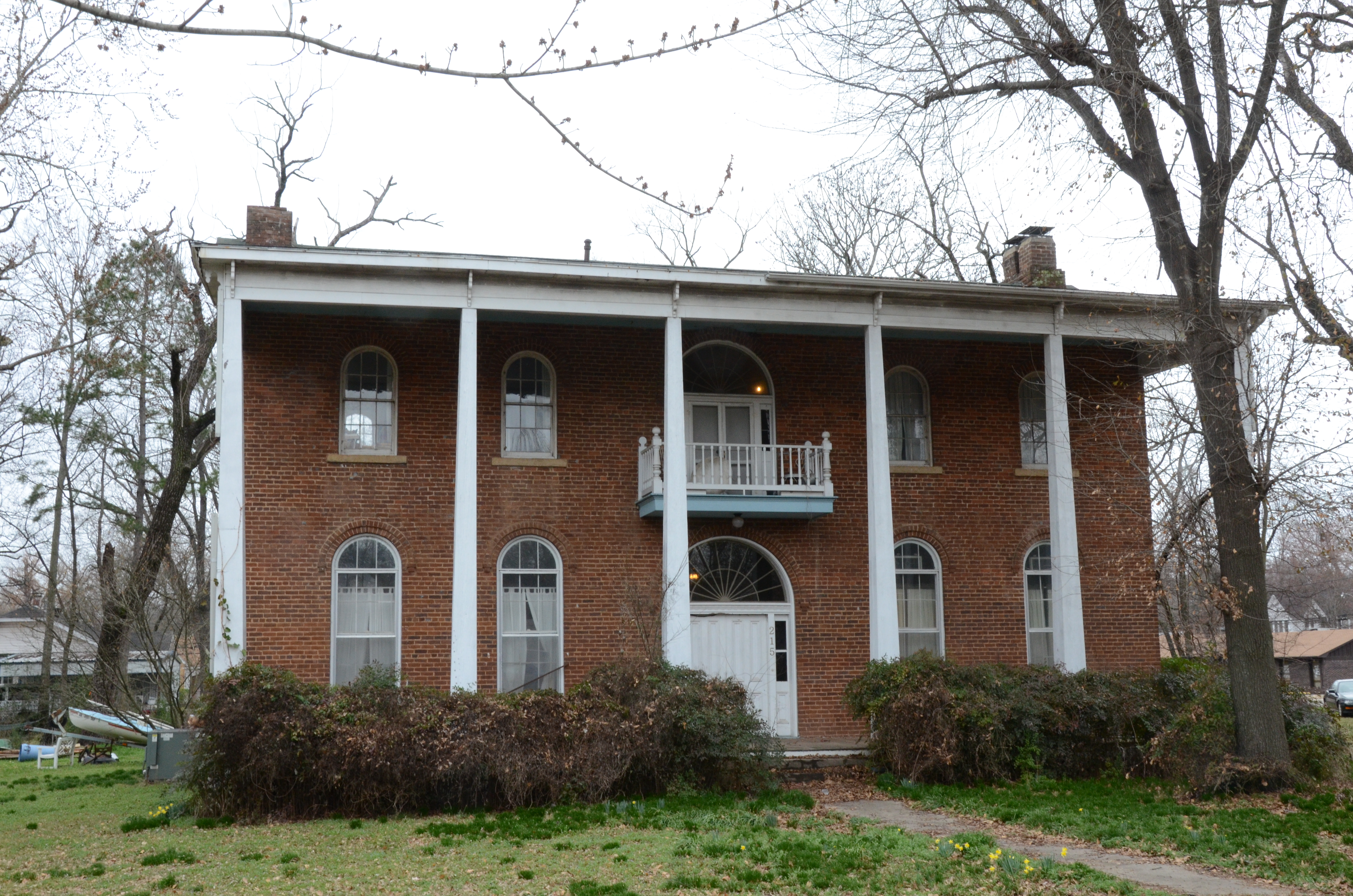

- Location within Arkansas Location within the United States
- Location: 215 N. Central, Clarksville, Arkansas
- Coordinates: 35°28′22″N 93°27′55″W
- Area: less than one acre
- Built: 1868
- Architectural style: Adamesque
- NRHP reference No.: 76000424
- Added to NRHP: January 2, 1976

The Capt. Archibald S. McKennon House is a historic house at 215 North Central Street in Clarksville, Arkansas. It is a two-story masonry structure, built of brick laid in common bond and covered by a flat roof. A two-story portico extends across its front, supported by slender tapered square columns. It was built in 1868 for Confederate Army veteran, prominent local businessman, and lawyer Archibald McKennon.

The house was listed on the National Register of Historic Places in 1976.

== See also ==
- National Register of Historic Places listings in Johnson County, Arkansas
