= Clarksville National Guard Armory =

- U.S. National Register of Historic Places
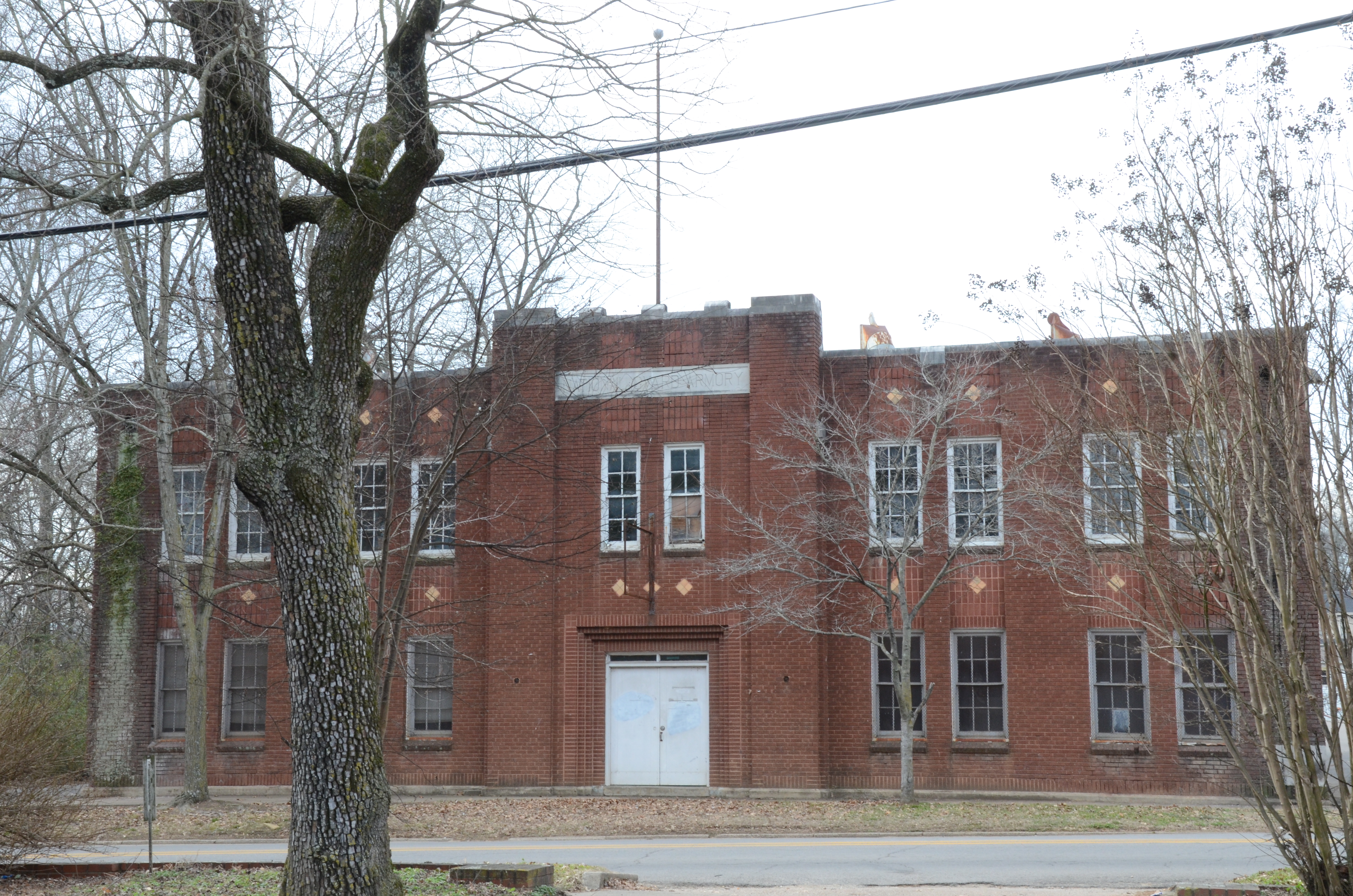

- Location within Arkansas Location within the United States
- Location: 309 College St., Clarksville, Arkansas
- Coordinates: 35°28′27.5″N 93°28′0″W
- Area: less than one acre
- Built: 1930
- Built by: E.V. Bird Construction Co.
- Architect: Durward F. Kyle
- Architectural style: Art Deco
- NRHP reference No.: 06001270
- Added to NRHP: January 24, 2007

The Clarksville National Guard Armory is a historic former National Guard Armory at 309 College Street in Clarksville, Arkansas. It is a two-story building, finished in brick with restrained Art Deco styling. Its main facade is 10 bays wide, with a projecting section at the center housing two bays on the upper floor, and a double door entrance on the first. The entrance is set in a stepped recess, and it and the windows above are flanked by brick pilasters at the corner of the projection. The building was built in 1930, and served the Arkansas National Guard as a training and storage facility until 1980, after which ownership was turned over to the city.

The building was listed on the National Register of Historic Places in 2007.

== See also ==
- National Register of Historic Places listings in Johnson County, Arkansas
