= Serpent Cave =

Archaeological site in Arkansas, United States

- U.S. National Register of Historic Places
- Nearest city: Clarksville, Arkansas
- Area: 0.1 acres (0.040 ha)
- MPS: Rock Art Sites in Arkansas TR
- NRHP reference No.: 82002120
- Added to NRHP: May 4, 1982

The Serpent Cave is a prehistoric rock art site near Clarksville, Arkansas. It features a panel depicting a serpentine figure, a common motif in the rock art of the Mississippian culture. Why a motif of that culture is found as far west as it is (in an area more dominated by Plains and Caddoan cultures before European contact) remains unexplained.

The site was listed on the National Register of Historic Places in 1982.

== See also ==
- National Register of Historic Places listings in Johnson County, Arkansas
