= Fremont Stokes House =

Historic house in Arkansas, United States

- U.S. National Register of Historic Places
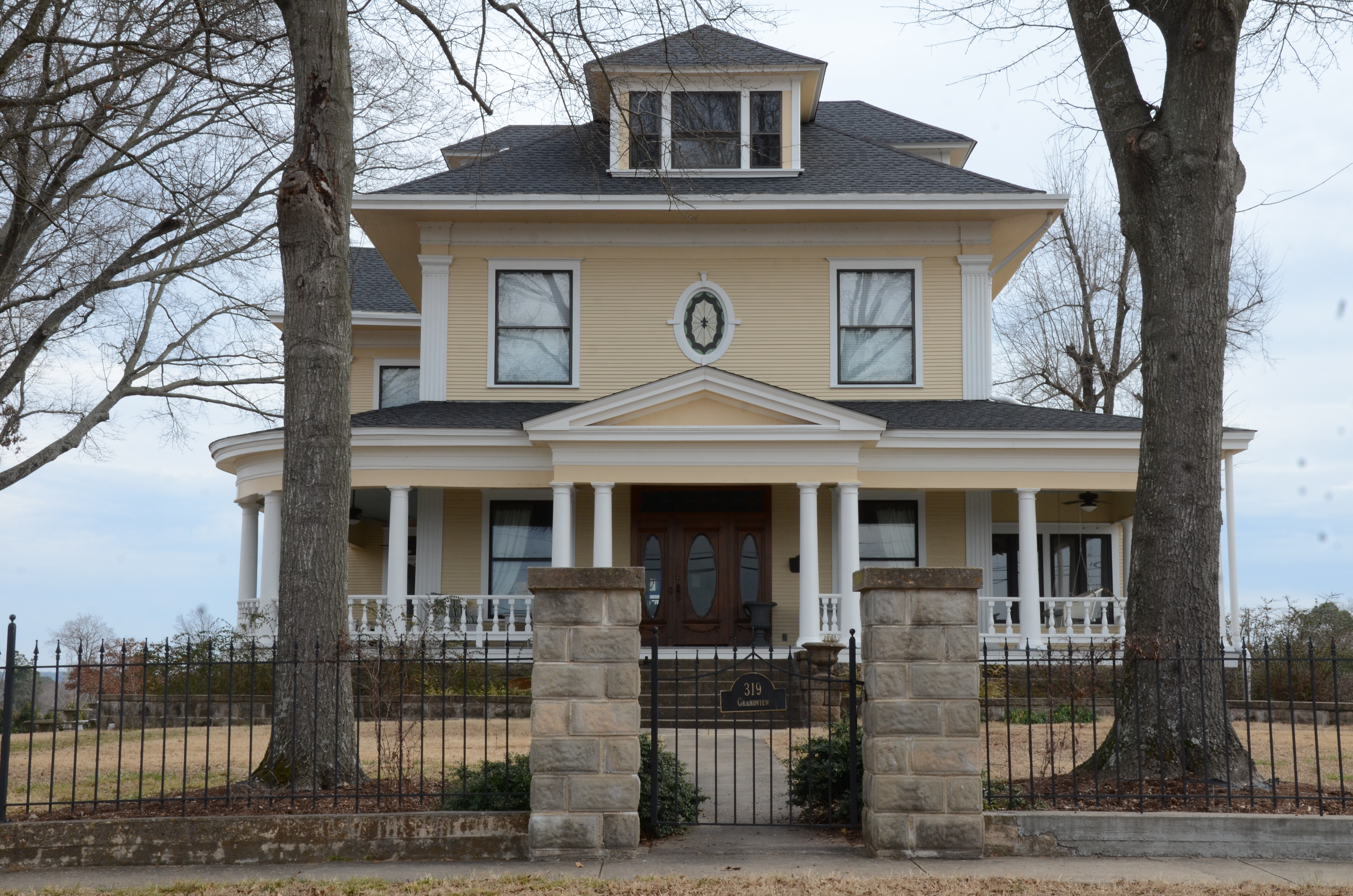

- Location within Arkansas Location within the United States
- Location: 319 Grandview Ave., Clarksville, Arkansas
- Coordinates: 35.46622°N 93.46263°W
- Built: 1908
- Architectural style: Colonial Revival
- NRHP reference No.: 08000488
- Added to NRHP: June 4, 2008

The Fremont Stokes House is a historic house at 319 Grandview in Clarksville, Arkansas. it is a 2 1/2-story wood-frame structure, with a hip roof, weatherboard siding, and a brick foundation. It is a high quality local example of Colonial Revival architecture with a symmetrical three-bay facade that has fluted pilasters at the corners. A single-story porch extends across the front and around to both sides, with a projecting gabled stair. It was built in 1908 for Fremont Stokes, the owner of a local coal mining company.

The house was listed on the National Register of Historic Places in 2008.

== See also ==
- National Register of Historic Places listings in Johnson County, Arkansas
