= McKennon House =

Historic house in Arkansas, United States

- U.S. National Register of Historic Places
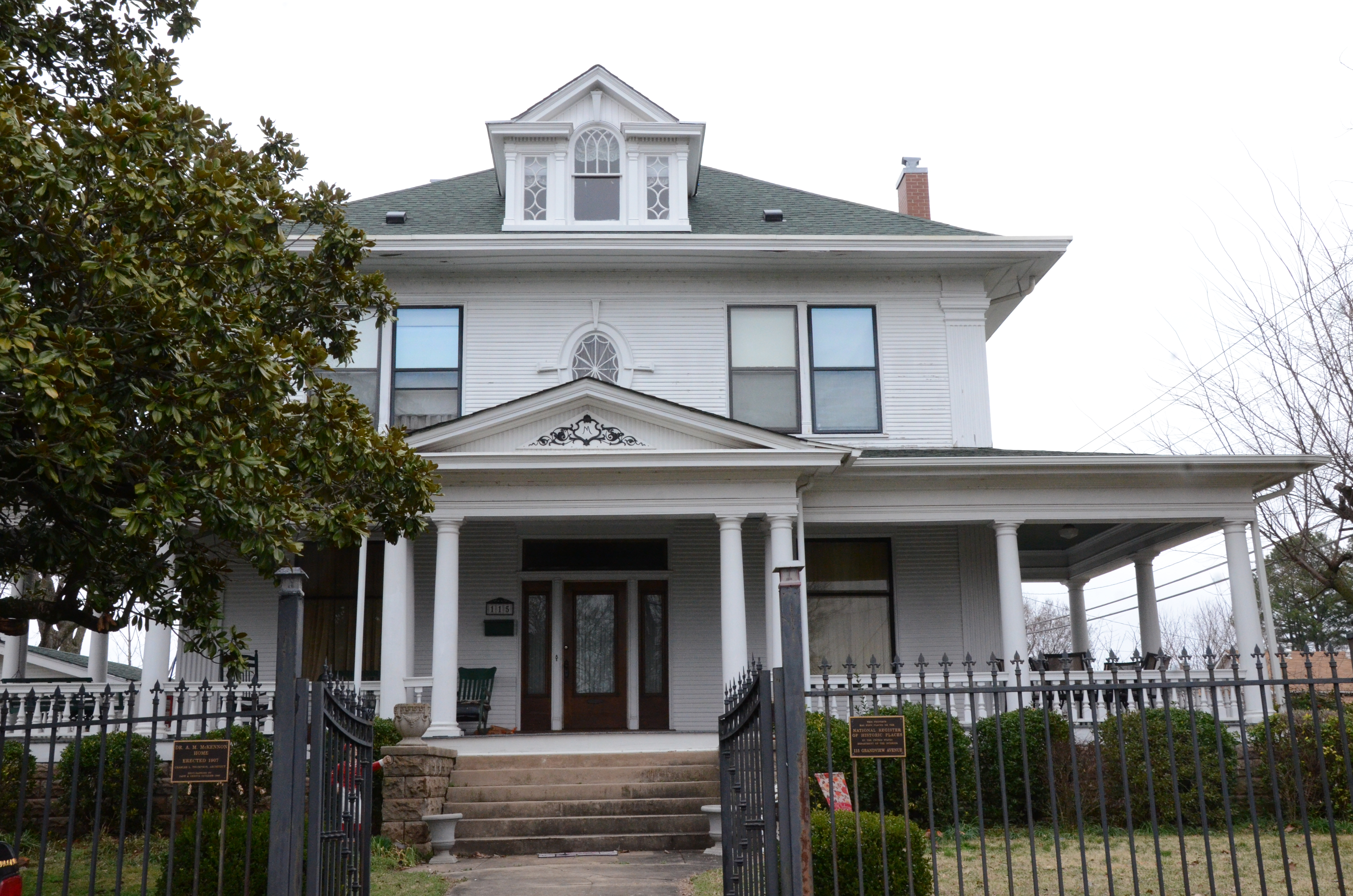

- Location within Arkansas Location within the United States
- Location: 115 Grandview, Clarksville, Arkansas
- Coordinates: 35°28′12″N 93°27′37″W
- Area: less than one acre
- Built: 1907
- Architect: Charles L. Thompson
- Architectural style: Colonial Revival
- MPS: Thompson, Charles L., Design Collection TR
- NRHP reference No.: 82000856
- Added to NRHP: December 22, 1982

The McKennon House is a historic house at 115 Grandview in Clarksville, Arkansas. It is a two-story wood frame American Foursquare house, with weatherboard siding and a hip roof flared at the edges. The front face of the roof is pierced by a gabled dormer housing a small Palladian window, its elements separated by narrow pilasters. A single-story porch wraps around three sides, supported by Tuscan columns, with a gabled projection at the main entrance. The house was designed by noted Arkansas architect Charles L. Thompson, and was built about 1907.

The house was listed on the National Register of Historic Places in 1982.

== See also ==
- National Register of Historic Places listings in Johnson County, Arkansas
