= Pioneer House (Clarksville, Arkansas) =

Historic house in Arkansas, United States

- U.S. National Register of Historic Places
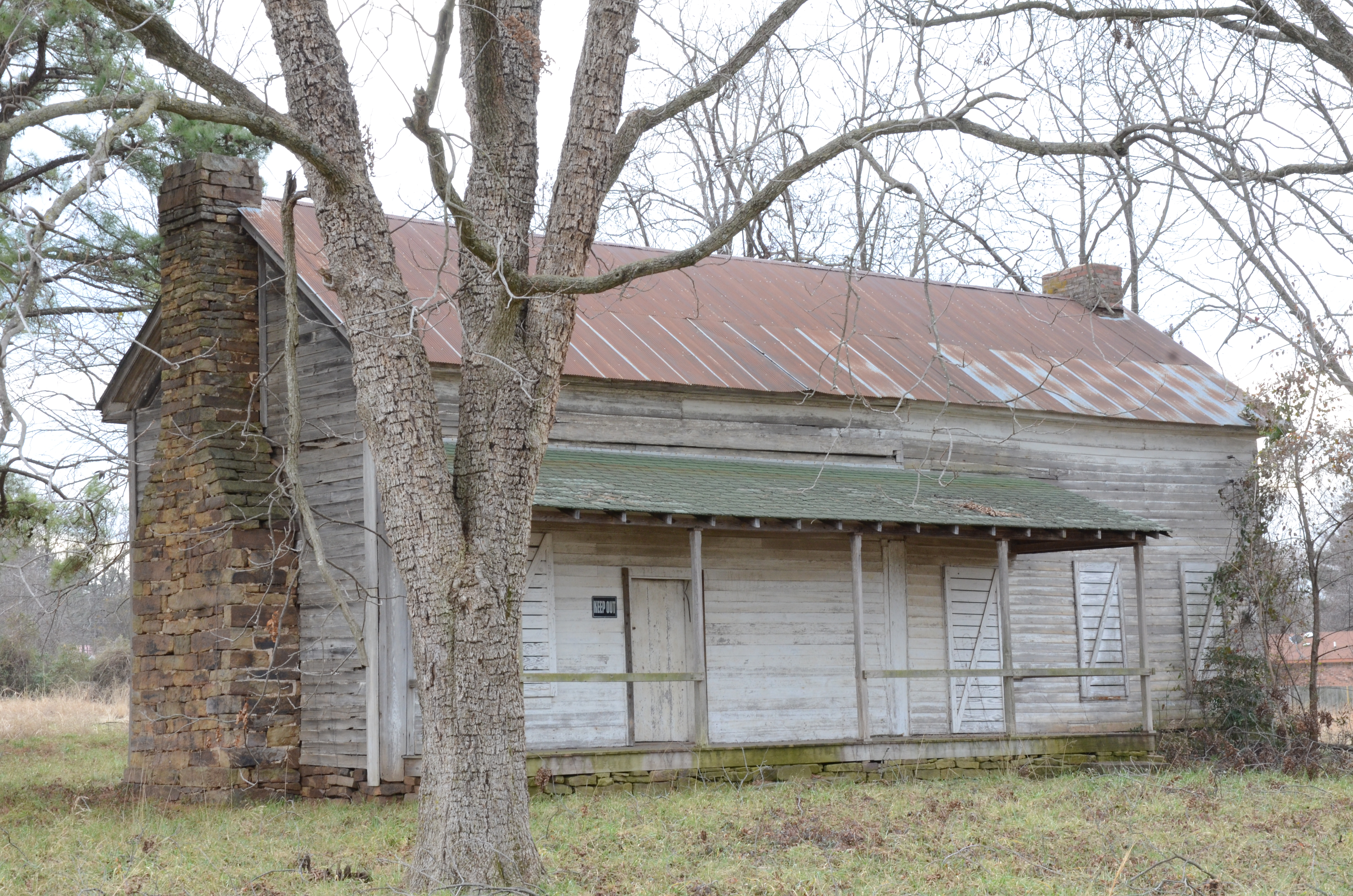

- Location within Arkansas Location within the United States
- Location: Hospital Dr., S of AR 123 and W of Johnson Co. Hospital, Clarksville, Arkansas
- Coordinates: 35°27′47″N 93°26′47″W
- NRHP reference No.: 95000363
- Added to NRHP: March 31, 1995

The Pioneer House is a historic house on Hospital Drive in Clarksville, Arkansas. It is a 1 1/2-story structure, partly built of logs and partly of wood framing, covered by a gabled roof and weatherboard siding. The eastern portion is built out of logs joined by dovetailed notches. A 1982 dendrochonological study of the logs used estimated the structure was likely originally built in 1850 and the style and methods used suggested the builders were of European descent. It is one of the oldest surviving buildings in the Clarksville and Johnson County region.

The house was listed on the National Register of Historic Places in 1995.

== See also ==
- National Register of Historic Places listings in Johnson County, Arkansas
