= Maclean Hall =

Maclean Hall or MacLean hall may refer to:

- MacLean Hall (University of the Ozarks)
- Maclean Hall, a building of the Pentacrest, at the University of Iowa
- Maclean Hall, a former residence at the University of Chicago
