= Tankersley-Stewart House =

Historic house in Arkansas, United States

- U.S. National Register of Historic Places
- Location within Arkansas Location within the United States
- Nearest city: Hunt, Arkansas
- Coordinates: 35°29′26″N 93°36′36″W
- Area: less than one acre
- Built: 1895
- Built by: Oliver Tankersley
- Architectural style: Greek Revival, box-constructed duple
- NRHP reference No.: 94000464
- Added to NRHP: May 19, 1994

The Tankersley-Stewart House was a historic house in rural Johnson County, Arkansas. Located north of Arkansas Highway 352, between Hunt and Clarksville, it was a single-story vernacular wood-frame structure and a gabled roof. A single-story porch extended across its front, supported by square posts. Its only significant styling was an interior fireplace mantel with Greek Revival features. It was built about 1895 by Dr. Oliver Tankersley.

The house was listed on the National Register of Historic Places in 1994. It has been listed as demolished in the Arkansas Historic Preservation Program database.

== See also ==
- National Register of Historic Places listings in Johnson County, Arkansas
