= Edward Taylor McConnell House =

Historic house in Arkansas, United States

- U.S. National Register of Historic Places
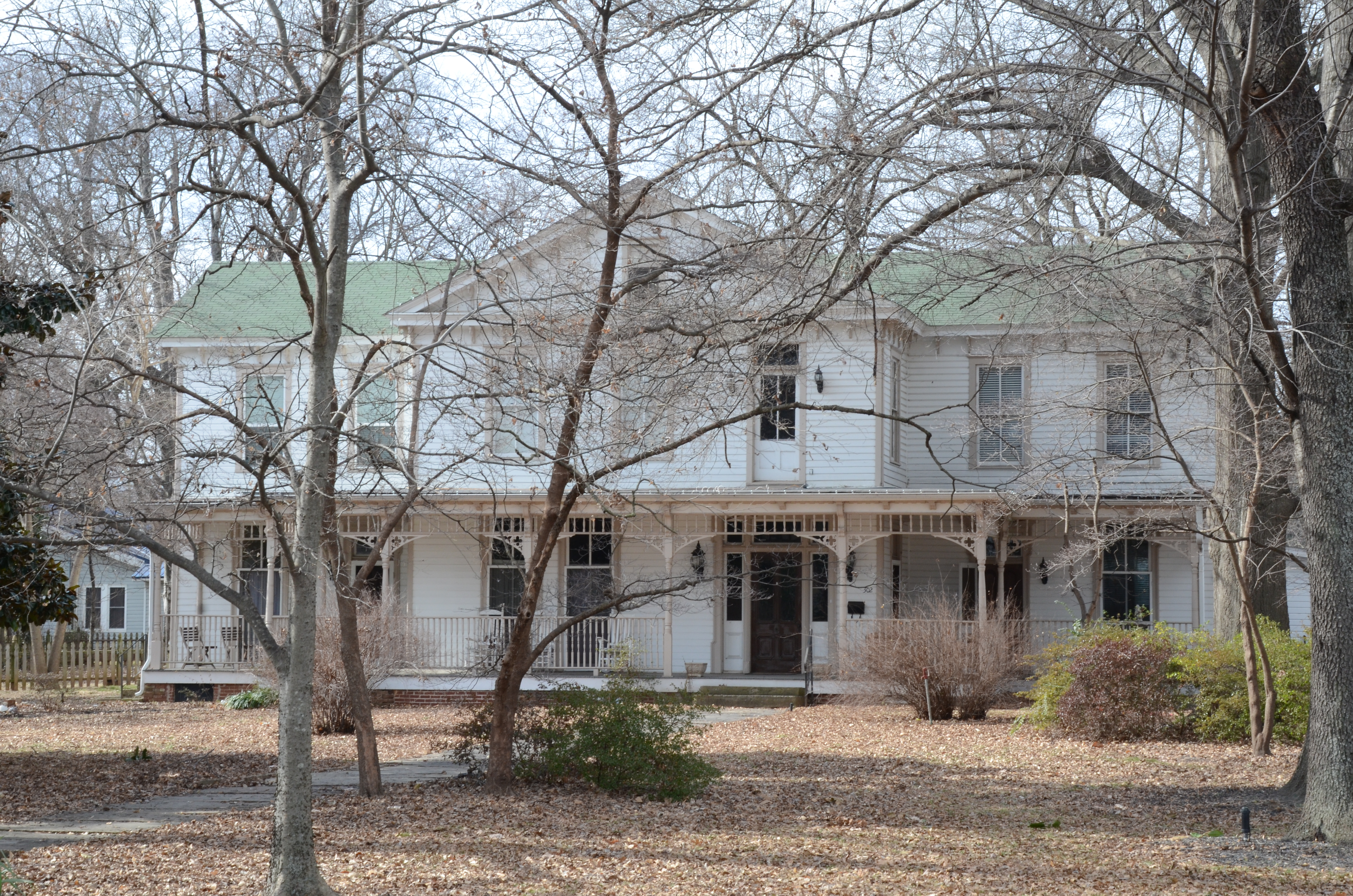

- Location within Arkansas Location within the United States
- Location: 302 S. Fulton St., Clarksville, Arkansas
- Coordinates: 35°28′9″N 93°27′57″W
- Area: 1.3 acres (0.53 ha)
- Built: 1869
- Architectural style: Folk Victorian
- NRHP reference No.: 01000485
- Added to NRHP: May 10, 2001

The Edward Taylor McConnell House is a historic house at 302 South Fulton Street in Clarksville, Arkansas. It is a two-story wood-frame structure, built in 1869 for use as a school and Masonic lodge. It was enlarged in 1876 for conversion to a private residence, and given Folk Victorian style, notably in the delicate spindlework of its front porch. The latter work was done for Edward Taylor McConnell, a prominent local businessman and figure in the Brooks-Baxter War.

The house was listed on the National Register of Historic Places in 2001.

== See also ==
- National Register of Historic Places listings in Johnson County, Arkansas
