= First Presbyterian Church (Clarksville, Arkansas) =

Historic church in Arkansas, United States

- U.S. National Register of Historic Places
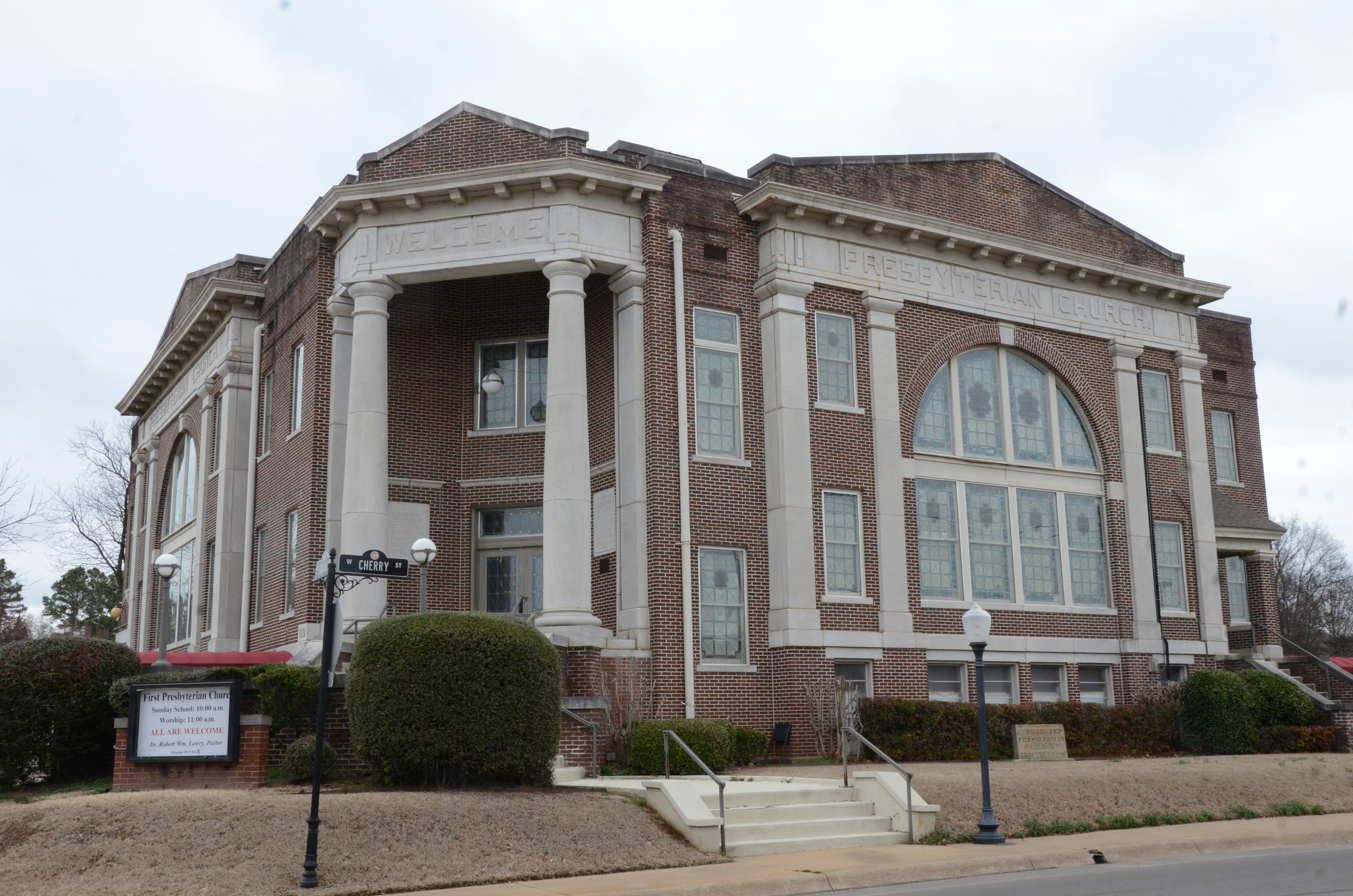

- Location within Arkansas Location within the United States
- Location: 212 College Ave., Clarksville, Arkansas
- Coordinates: 35°28′21″N 93°27′57″W
- Area: less than one acre
- Built: 1922
- Architect: Clarke, A.O.
- Architectural style: Classical Revival
- NRHP reference No.: 91000588
- Added to NRHP: May 13, 1991

The First Presbyterian Church is a historic church building at 212 College Avenue in Clarksville, Arkansas. It is a two-story steel-framed structure, finished in brick. It is rectangular, with a central sanctuary flanked on the sides by office and meeting spaces. At the center of its roof is a dome, which is obscured by gabled parapets on the street-facing facades. The church was designed by Rogers based architect A.O. Clarke, and was completed in 1922 for a congregation founded in 1840. It is the finest example of Classical Revival architecture in Johnson County.

The building was listed on the National Register of Historic Places in 1991.

Facing rising costs and a dwindling congregation, the church moved to the chapel at the University of the Ozarks in 2017. As of 2026, the building is for sale.

== See also ==
- National Register of Historic Places listings in Johnson County, Arkansas
