= Clarksville Confederate Monument =

- U.S. National Register of Historic Places
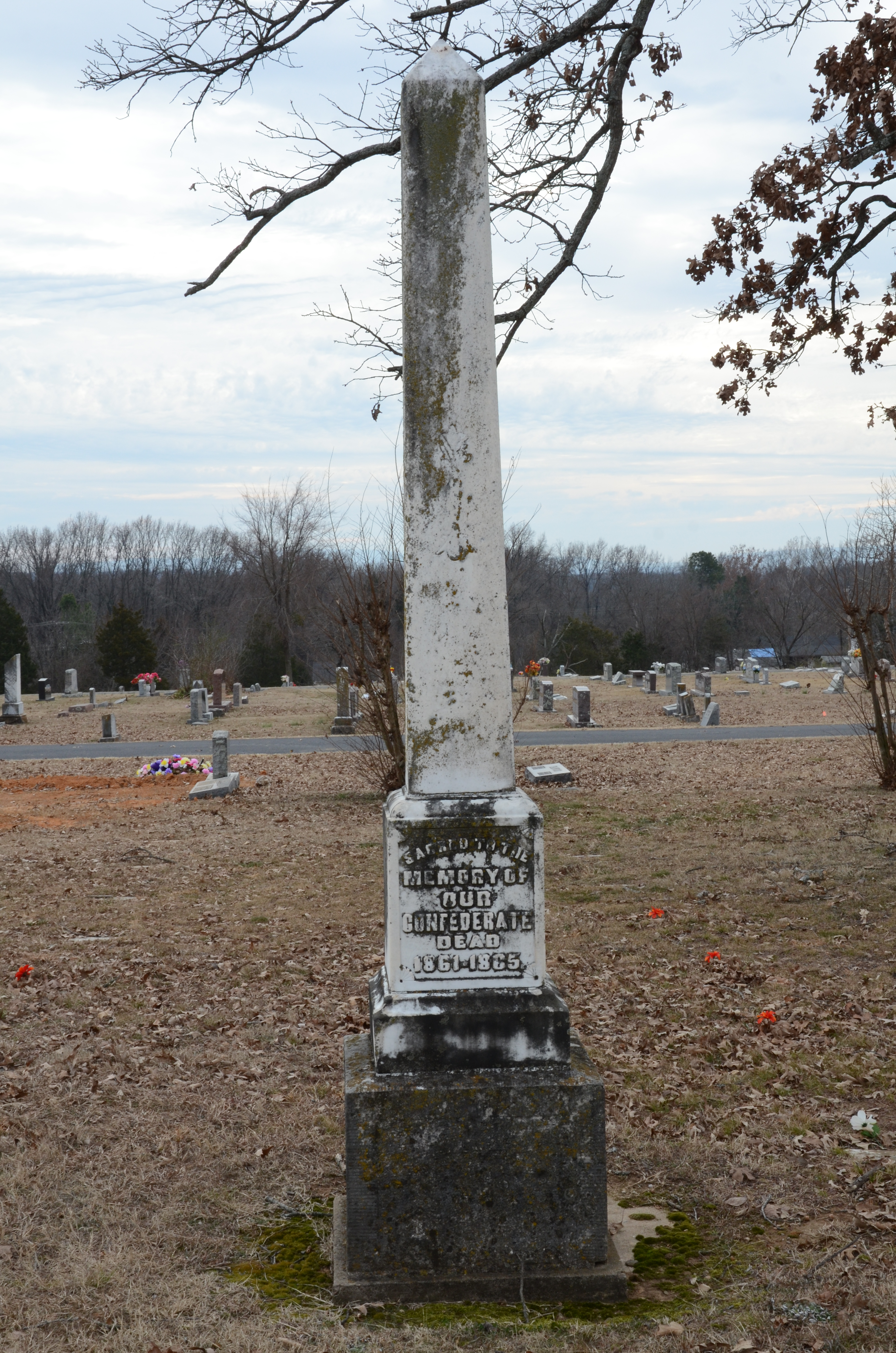

- Location within Arkansas Location within the United States
- Location: Oakland Memorial Cemetery, W. of Montgomery Ave., Clarksville, Arkansas
- Coordinates: 35°28′4″N 93°28′39″W
- Area: less than one acre
- Built: 1902
- Architectural style: Classical Revival
- MPS: Civil War Commemorative Sculpture MPS
- NRHP reference No.: 99000709
- Added to NRHP: June 25, 1999

The Clarksville Confederate Monument is located in the south-central section of Oakland Cemetery in Clarksville, Arkansas. It is a white marble obelisk, 10 feet (3.0 m) in height, which is 21.5 inches (55 cm) square at its base. It is mounted on a limestone pedestal 2 feet (0.61 m) square and 22 inches (56 cm) in height. The lower portion of the obelisk is carved with an inscription commemorating the Confederate war dead, and its spire is adorned with a floral pattern. It was placed about 1902 by the local chapter of the United Daughters of the Confederacy.

The inscription reads:

SACRED TO THE
MEMORY OF
OUR
CONFEDERATE
DEAD
1861-1865

The monument was listed on the National Register of Historic Places in 1999.

== See also ==
- National Register of Historic Places listings in Johnson County, Arkansas
