= King's Canyon Petroglyphs =

Archaeological site in Arkansas, United States

- U.S. National Register of Historic Places
- Nearest city: Clarksville, Arkansas
- Area: 0.1 acres (0.040 ha)
- MPS: Rock Art Sites in Arkansas TR
- NRHP reference No.: 82002119
- Added to NRHP: May 4, 1982

The King's Canyon Petroglyphs are a prehistoric rock art site near Clarksville, Arkansas. The site includes a panel petroglyphs, which include depictions of a sunburst motif and what look like turkey tracks. The latter is a particularly uncommon subject for rock art in this area.

The site was listed on the National Register of Historic Places in 1982.

== See also ==
- National Register of Historic Places listings in Johnson County, Arkansas
