= Pennington House (Clarksville, Arkansas) =

Historic house in Arkansas, United States

- U.S. National Register of Historic Places
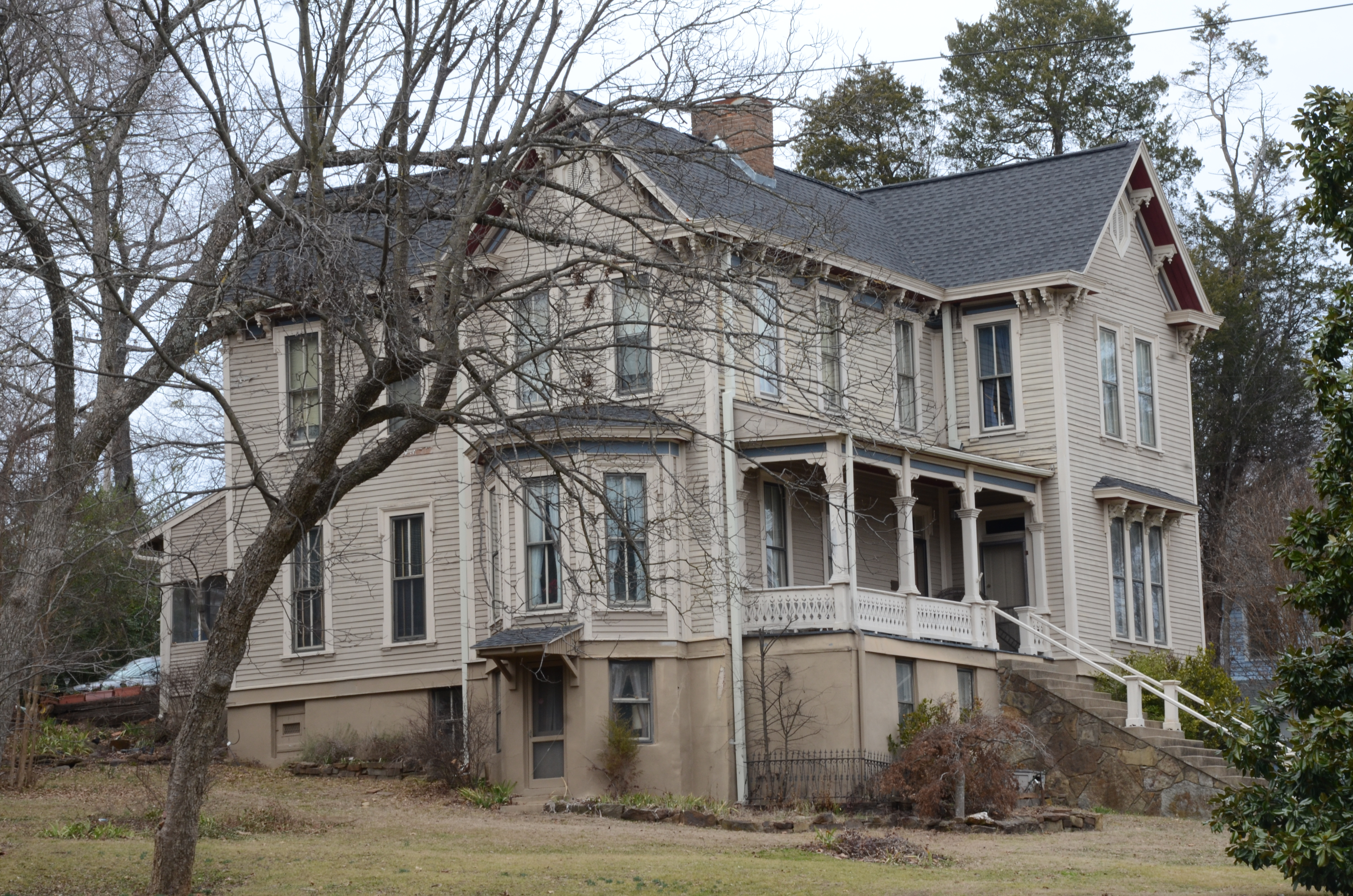

- Location within Arkansas Location within the United States
- Location: 317 Johnson St., Clarksville, Arkansas
- Coordinates: 35°28′23″N 93°28′9″W
- Area: 1.4 acres (0.57 ha)
- Built: 1888
- Architectural style: Italianate
- NRHP reference No.: 94001416
- Added to NRHP: December 1, 1994

The Pennington House is a historic house at 317 Johnson Street in Clarksville, Arkansas. It is a 2 1/2-story wood-frame structure, with a complex cross-gabled plan, weatherboard siding, and a stuccoed brick foundation. It has an eclectic blend of Italianate and Folk Victorian features, including paired brackets in its eaves, moulded hoods over its sash windows, and a decorated porch. The house was built in 1888-89 by B.D. Pennington.

The house was listed on the National Register of Historic Places in 1994.

== See also ==
- National Register of Historic Places listings in Johnson County, Arkansas
