= Dover to Clarksville Road-Hickeytown Road Segment =

- Dover to Clarksville Road-Hickeytown Road Segment.JPG

The Dover to Clarksville Road-Hickeytown Road Segment is a historic road section southeast of Lamar, Arkansas. It consists of a 1.3-mile (2.1 km) section of Old Hickeytown Road, beginning at its junction with County Road 2651. The roadbed is about 17 feet (5.2 m) wide and lined with ditches on either side. The western portion of the road, while paved, exhibits similar characteristics. The road's construction date is unknown, but its design likely dates it to the 1830s or early 1840s. It was probably used by a party of Cherokee in 1834, during the Trail of Tears forced migration.

The road section was listed on the National Register of Historic Places in 2005.

== See also ==
- National Register of Historic Places listings in Johnson County, Arkansas
