= Taylor Hill Hotel =

Historic house in Arkansas, United States

- U.S. National Register of Historic Places
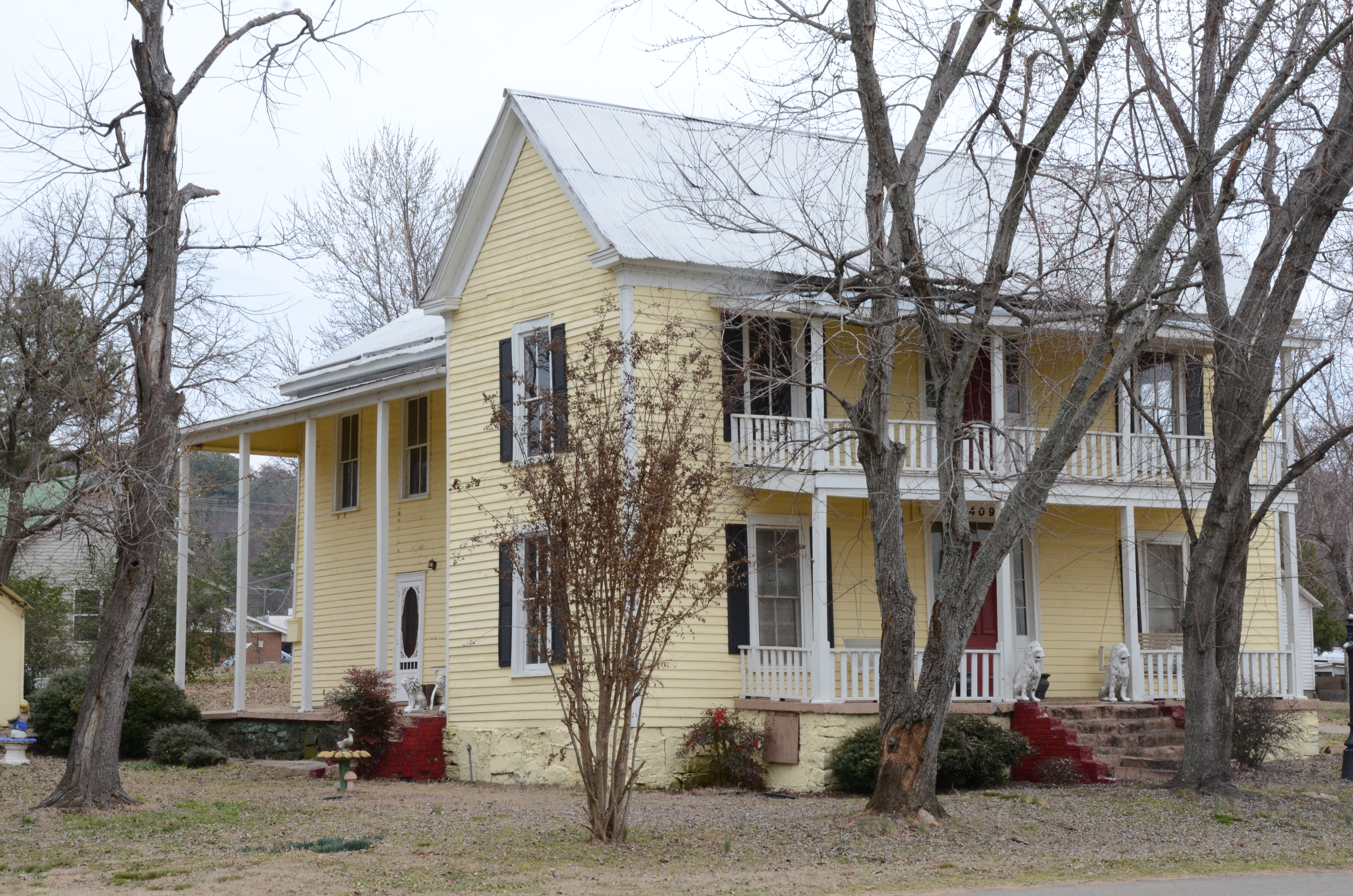

- Location within Arkansas Location within the United States
- Location: 409 Alabama St., Coal Hill, Arkansas
- Coordinates: 35°26′17″N 93°40′15″W
- Area: less than one acre
- Built: 1890
- Architectural style: I-house
- NRHP reference No.: 08001007
- Added to NRHP: October 21, 2008

The Taylor Hill Hotel is a historic former hotel building at 409 Alabama Street in Coal Hill, Arkansas, United States. Now a private residence, it is a two-story wood-frame I-house, with a gabled roof and weatherboard siding. A two-story ell extends to the rear, giving the building a T shape. A two-story porch extends across much of the front, supported by square columns. The building has a mixture of simple Greek Revival and Folk Victorian details. It was probably built about 1890, when Coal Hill was the largest city in Johnson County.

The building was listed on the National Register of Historic Places in 2008.

== See also ==
- National Register of Historic Places listings in Johnson County, Arkansas
