= Union School (Hagarville, Arkansas) =

- U.S. National Register of Historic Places
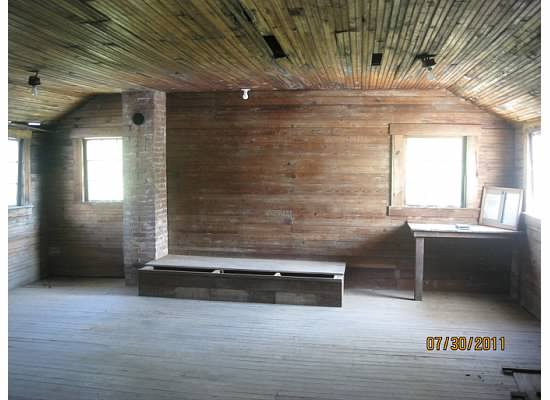
- View of the upper level

- Location within Arkansas Location within the United States
- Location: North side of County Road 4670, west of Little Piney Creek, Ozark-St. Francis National Forest
- Coordinates: 35°38′4″N 93°19′43″W
- Area: less than one acre
- Built: 1929
- Built by: Willis Warren, Orville Skaggs
- MPS: Public Schools in the Ozarks MPS
- NRHP reference No.: 10001150
- Added to NRHP: January 24, 2011

The Union School is a historic school building in a rural setting of Ozark-St. Francis National Forest in Johnson County, Arkansas. It is a 1 1/2-story wood-frame structure, with a gabled roof, weatherboard siding, and a stone foundation. A central cross-gabled section rises to provide additional classroom space in the attic level. The school was built by local craftsmen in 1928–29, replacing a previous structure which had been destroyed by fire. The building has historically served the surrounding rural community as a community center, Masonic lodge, church, and school.

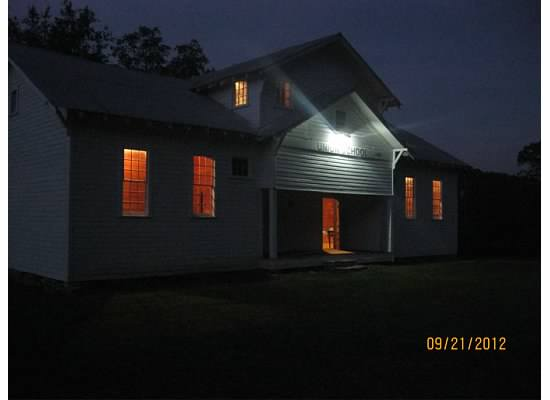
Union School at night

The building was listed on the National Register of Historic Places in 2011.

== See also ==
- National Register of Historic Places listings in Johnson County, Arkansas
