= Ozone School =

- U.S. National Register of Historic Places
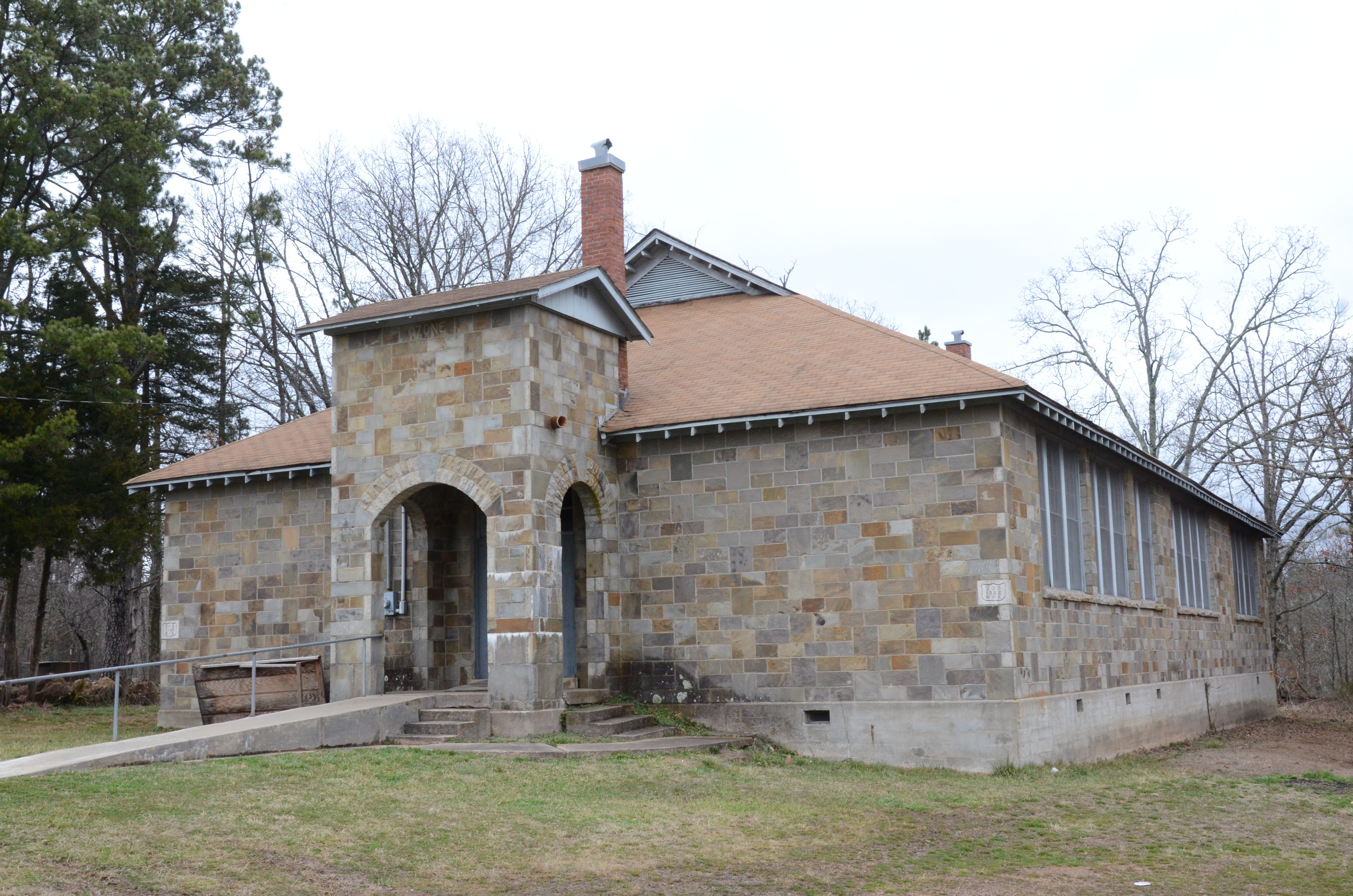

- Location within Arkansas Location within the United States
- Location: 14137 AR 21, Ozone, Arkansas
- Coordinates: 35°37′51″N 93°26′34″W
- Area: less than one acre
- Built: 1942
- Built by: Works Progress Administration
- Architectural style: Bungalow/craftsman
- MPS: Public Schools in the Ozarks MPS
- NRHP reference No.: 14001200
- Added to NRHP: January 27, 2015

The Ozone School is a historic school building at 14137 Arkansas Highway 21 in Ozone, Arkansas. It is a single-story masonry structure, built out of coursed fieldstone blocks and covered by gable-on-hip roof with exposed rafter ends. Its front entrance is sheltered by a distinctive projecting tower, with arched openings at the base and a transverse gabled roof above. The school was built in 1942 with funding from the Works Progress Administration, and was used as a public school until 1957, when the local district was consolidated with that of Lamar. The building was listed on the National Register of Historic Places in 2015.

== See also ==
- National Register of Historic Places listings in Johnson County, Arkansas
