= MacLean Hall (University of the Ozarks) =

- U.S. National Register of Historic Places
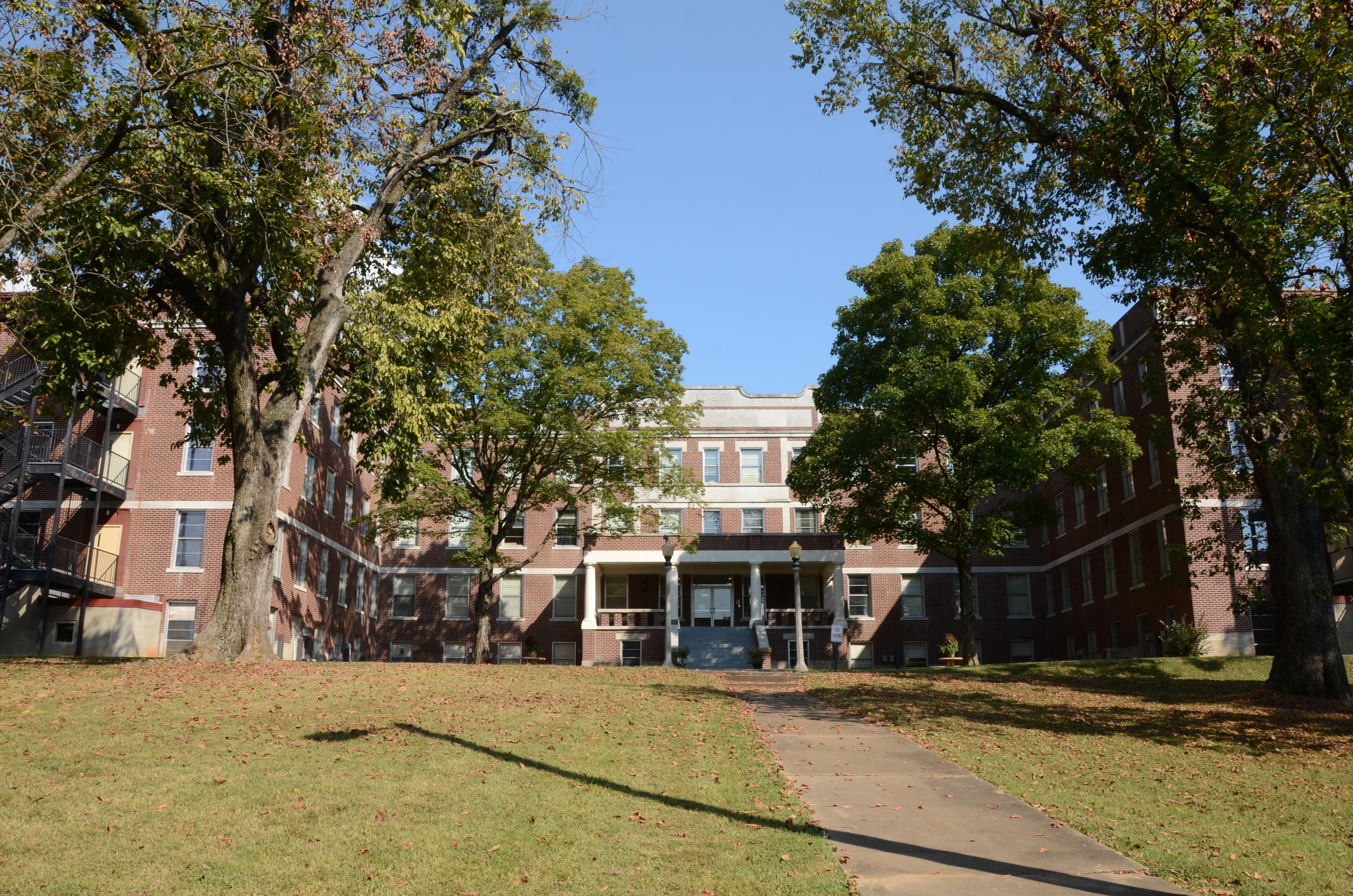

- Location within Arkansas Location within the United States
- Location: 415 N. College Ave., Clarksville, Arkansas
- Coordinates: 35°28′33″N 93°27′59″W
- Area: less than one acre
- Built: 1926
- Architectural style: Classical Revival
- NRHP reference No.: 100001008
- Added to NRHP: June 15, 2017

MacLean Hall is a historic academic building on the campus of the University of the Ozarks in Clarksville, Arkansas. It is a three-story H-shaped masonry structure, with a flat roof and limestone trim. Its Classical Revival features include the main entrance, set at the center of the H and sheltered by a portico supported by four Tuscan columns. It was built in 1926–27 to house the college's growing male student population, and was used as housing by the United States Navy in 1944–45, when the Navy leased the entire campus as a training and education facility.

The building was listed on the National Register of Historic Places in 2017.

== See also ==
- National Register of Historic Places listings in Johnson County, Arkansas
