= St. Paul Lutheran School =

- U.S. National Register of Historic Places
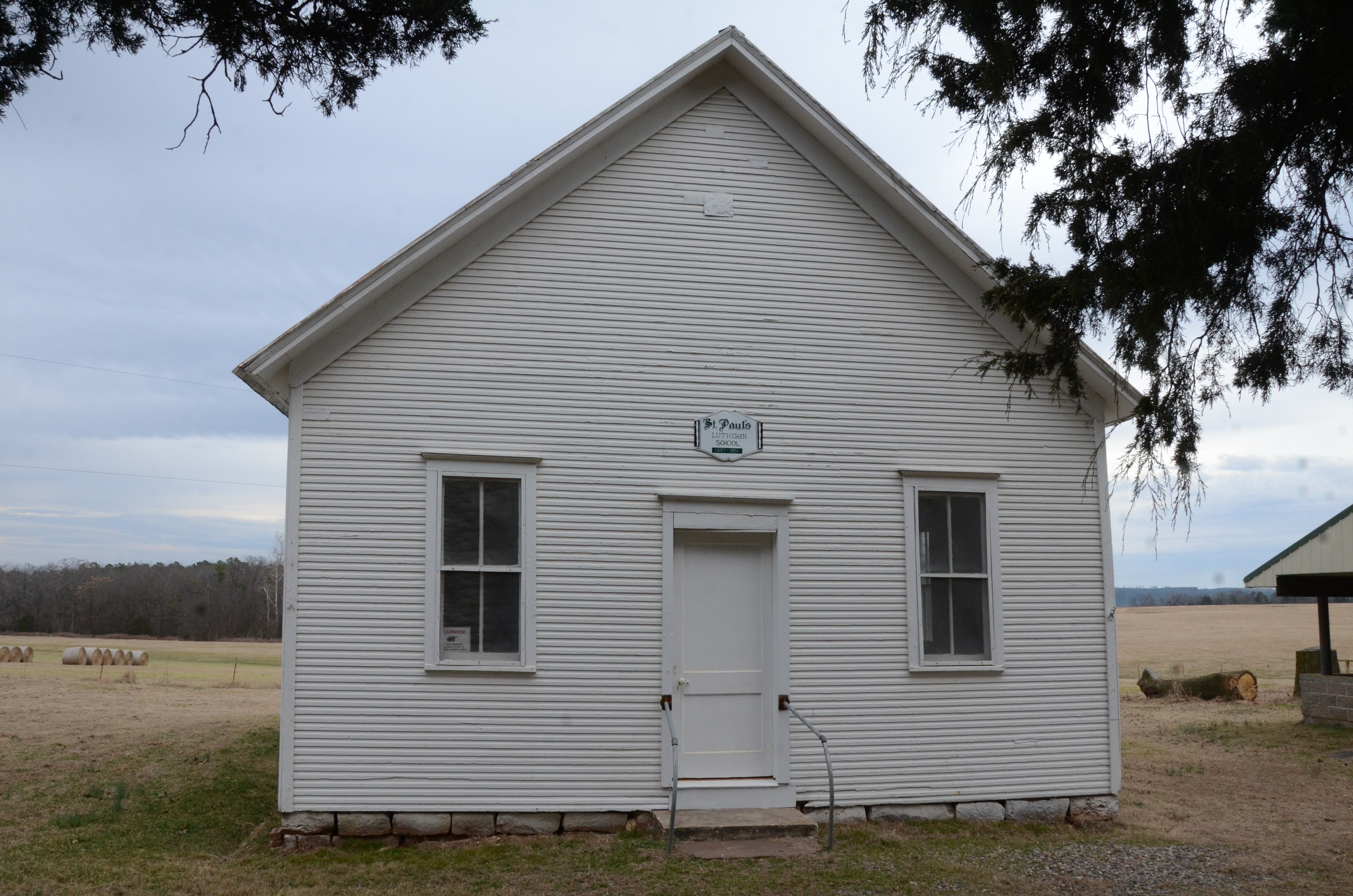

- Location within Arkansas Location within the United States
- Nearest city: Lamar, Arkansas
- Coordinates: 35°28′44″N 93°16′52″W
- Area: less than one acre
- Built: 1904
- Architectural style: Plain traditional
- NRHP reference No.: 99000228
- Added to NRHP: March 5, 1999

The St. Paul Lutheran School, also known as the Lutherville School, is a historic school building in rural Johnson County, Arkansas. It is located on the east side of County Road 418, northeast of Lamar. It is a vernacular single-story wood-frame structure, with a gabled roof, weatherboard siding, and a fieldstone foundation. It was built in 1904, and is (along with the nearby cemetery) one of the only surviving remnants of an early 20th-century German Lutheran immigrant community.

The building was listed on the National Register of Historic Places in 1999.

== See also ==
- National Register of Historic Places listings in Johnson County, Arkansas
