= Munger House =

Historic house in Arkansas, United States

- U.S. National Register of Historic Places
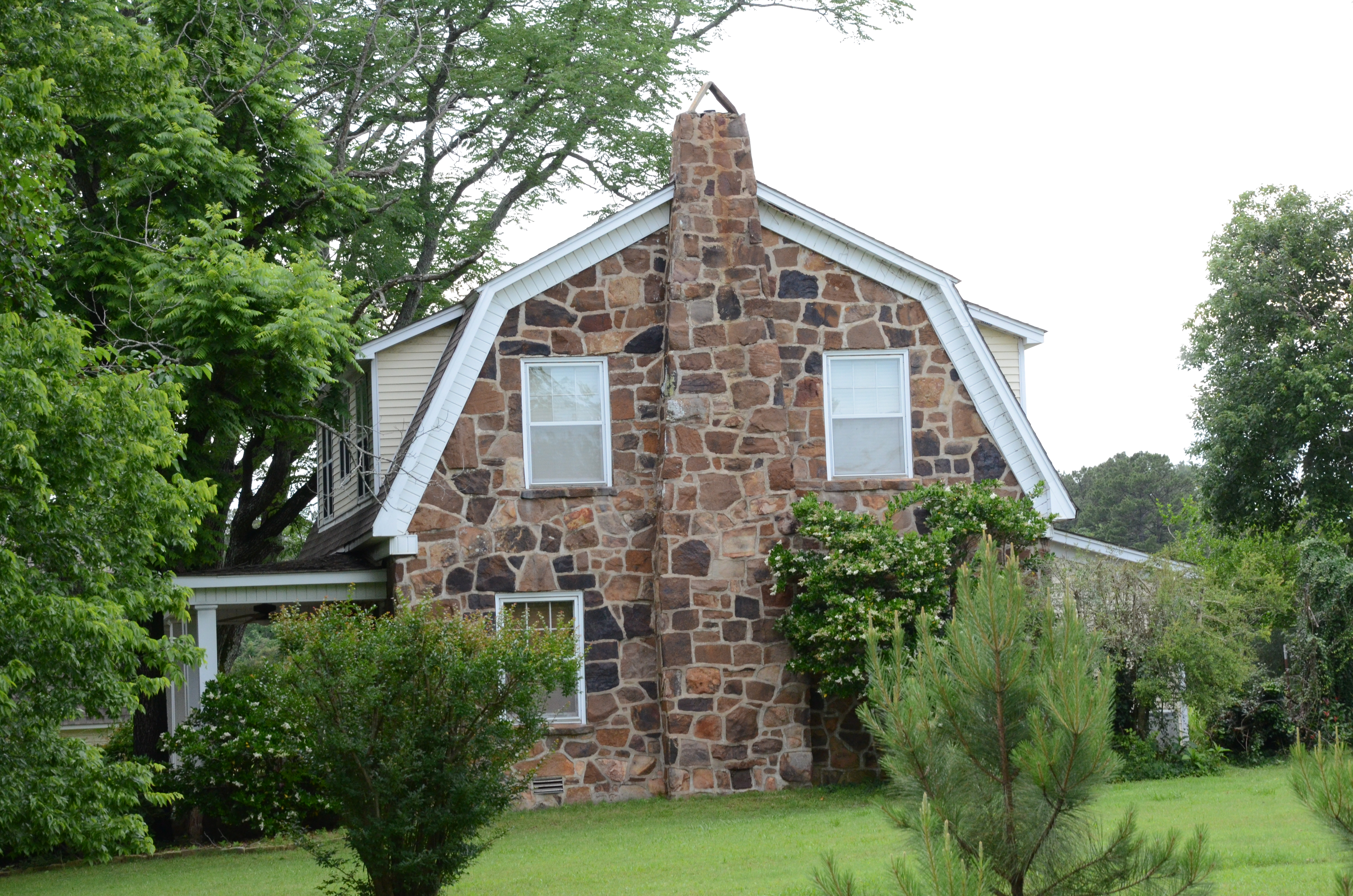

- Location within Arkansas Location within the United States
- Nearest city: West of County Road 3851, approximately ¾ mile north of the Pope County line, near Lutherville, Arkansas
- Coordinates: 35°28′35″N 93°15′2″W
- Area: 3 acres (1.2 ha)
- Built by: Homer Kraus
- Architectural style: Dutch Colonial Revival
- NRHP reference No.: 96001174
- Added to NRHP: November 8, 1996

The Munger House is a historic house in rural eastern Johnson County, Arkansas. It is located east of Lamar, on the west side of County Road 3851, about 0.25 miles (0.40 km) north of the Pope County line. It is a two-story masonry structure, built out of uncoursed fieldstone and topped by a Dutch Colonial gambrel roof with shed dormers. The roof overhangs a recessed porch supported by square columns. The house interior retains original features, including Art Nouveau light fixtures. It was built in 1934 for Hubert and Vera Munger, and is the area's finest example of Dutch Colonial architecture.

The house was listed on the National Register of Historic Places in 1996.

== See also ==
- National Register of Historic Places listings in Johnson County, Arkansas
