= Clarksville station (Arkansas) =

- Missouri-Pacific Depot-Clarksville
- U.S. National Register of Historic Places
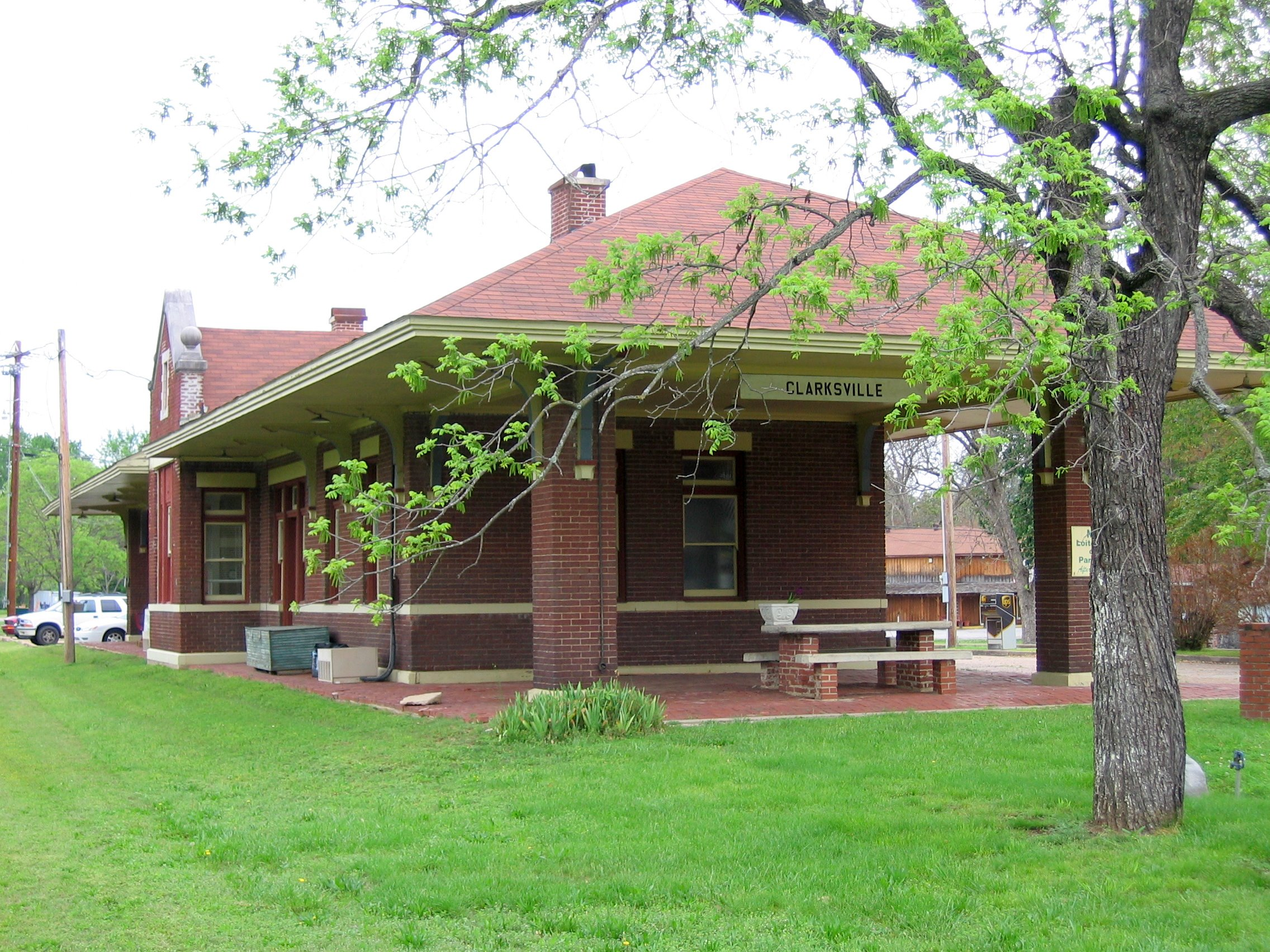

- Location within Arkansas Location within the United States
- Location: W of College St. between Cherry and Main Sts., Clarksville, Arkansas
- Coordinates: 35°28′18″N 93°28′7″W
- Area: less than one acre
- Built: 1910
- Built by: Missouri-Pacific Railroad
- Architectural style: Late 19th And 20th Century Revivals
- MPS: Historic Railroad Depots of Arkansas MPS
- NRHP reference No.: 92000604
- Added to NRHP: June 11, 1992

The Missouri-Pacific Depot-Clarksville is a historic railroad station between Cherry and Main Streets in Clarksville, Arkansas. It is a single-story masonry structure, built in 1910 by the Missouri-Pacific Railroad in the Mediterranean style. It is basically rectangular, with a projecting cross-gabled telegrapher's booth on the track side, which is topped by a distinctive parapeted gable. The roof has extended eaves supported by large Italianate brackets.

The building was listed on the National Register of Historic Places in 1992.

== See also ==
- National Register of Historic Places listings in Johnson County, Arkansas
