= Coal Hill, Arkansas =

- City
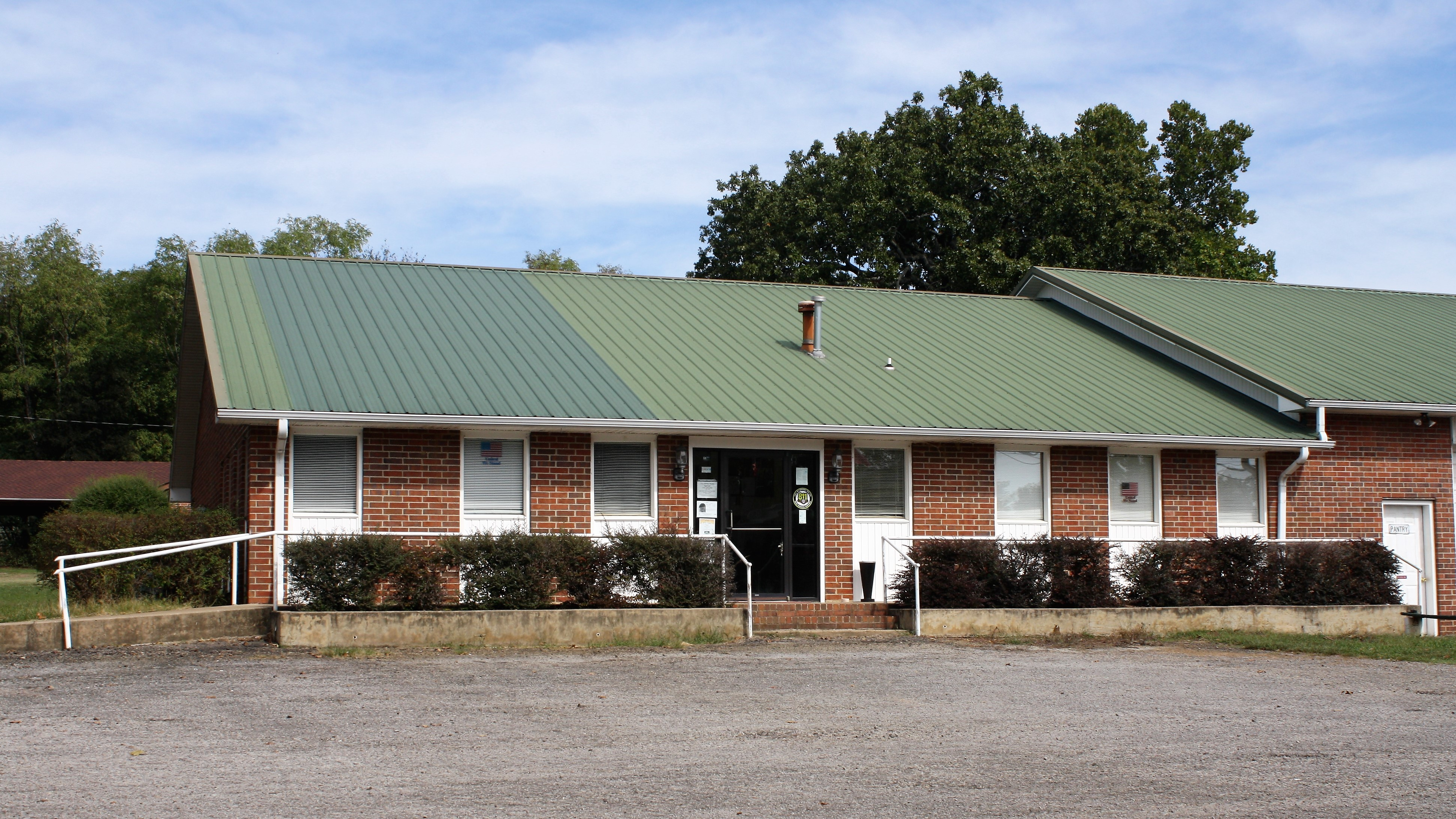
- Coal Hill City Hall

- Location of Coal Hill in Johnson County, Arkansas
- Coordinates: 35°26′15″N 93°39′53″W
- Country: United States
- State: Arkansas
- County: Johnson

Area
  - Total: 2.83 sq mi (7.33 km^{2})
  - Land: 2.80 sq mi (7.26 km^{2})
  - Water: 0.027 sq mi (0.07 km^{2})
- Elevation: 486 ft (148 m)

Population (2020)
  - Total: 820
  - Estimate (2025): 822 ▲
  - Density: 292.4/sq mi (112.91/km^{2})
- Time zone: UTC-6 (Central (CST))
  - Summer (DST): UTC-5 (CDT)
- ZIP code: 72832
- Area code: 479
- FIPS code: 05-14500
- GNIS feature ID: 2404084
- Website: cityofcoalhillar.municipalimpact.com

Coal Hill is a city in Johnson County, Arkansas, United States. The population was 820 at the 2020 census.

== History ==
The community was named for the presence of a coal mine near the town site.

== Geography ==
Coal Hill is located in southwestern Johnson County. U.S. Highway 64 passes through the center of town, leading east 12 miles (19 km) to Clarksville, the county seat, and west 10 miles (16 km) to Ozark. Arkansas Highway 164 runs north from the east end of Coal Hill 4 miles (6 km) to Interstate 40 at Exit 47.

According to the United States Census Bureau, the city has a total area of 2.72 square miles (7.05 km^{2}), of which 0.02 square miles (0.05 km^{2}), or 0.77%, are water. The city is 4 miles (6 km) north of the Arkansas River.

== Demographics ==
Historical population
Census	Pop.	Note	%±
1880	200		—
1890	802		301.0%
1900	1,341		67.2%
1910	1,229		−8.4%
1920	1,057		−14.0%
1930	1,169		10.6%
1940	1,040		−11.0%
1950	873		−16.1%
1960	704		−19.4%
1970	733		4.1%
1980	859		17.2%
1990	912		6.2%
2000	1,001		9.8%
2010	1,012		1.1%
2020	820		−19.0%
2025 (est.)	822	▲	0.2%
U.S. Decennial Census

=== 2020 census ===
Coal Hill racial composition
Race	Number	Percentage
White (non-Hispanic)	737	89.88%
Black or African American (non-Hispanic)	2	0.24%
Native American	8	0.98%
Asian	7	0.85%
Pacific Islander	1	0.12%
Other/Mixed	43	5.24%
Hispanic or Latino	22	2.68%

As of the 2020 United States census, there were 820 people, 430 households, and 305 families residing in the city.

=== 2000 census ===
As of the census of 2000, there were 1,001 people, 411 households, and 274 families residing in the city. The population density was 370.9 inhabitants per square mile (143.2/km^{2}). There were 474 housing units at an average density of 175.6 per square mile (67.8/km^{2}). The racial makeup of the city was 95.50% White, 0.40% Native American, 1.90% from other races, and 2.20% from two or more races. 2.70% of the population were Hispanic or Latino of any race.

There were 411 households, out of which 29.4% had children under the age of 18 living with them, 49.6% were married couples living together, 12.7% had a female householder with no husband present, and 33.3% were non-families. 29.9% of all households were made up of individuals, and 14.6% had someone living alone who was 65 years of age or older. The average household size was 2.44 and the average family size was 2.99.

In the city, the population was spread out, with 24.6% under the age of 18, 9.7% from 18 to 24, 28.0% from 25 to 44, 21.6% from 45 to 64, and 16.2% who were 65 years of age or older. The median age was 36 years. For every 100 females, there were 95.5 males. For every 100 females age 18 and over, there were 92.1 males.

The median income for a household in the city was $23,490, and the median income for a family was $34,250. Males had a median income of $23,077 versus $16,544 for females. The per capita income for the city was $13,540. About 16.6% of families and 21.1% of the population were below the poverty line, including 23.5% of those under age 18 and 22.9% of those age 65 or over.

== Notable people ==
- Marshall Chrisman, businessman and politician, born in Coal Hill in 1933
- Boss Schmidt, born in Coal Hill, major league baseball player
- Mildred Mathews Breedlove (27 May 1904 – 14 August 1994) was an American poet who was appointed as the Poet Laureate of Nevada from 1957 to 1967 and nominated for the Nobel Prize in Literature in 1968.
