= Hill Hotel (Portland, Oregon) =

Historic building in Portland, Oregon, U.S.

- U.S. National Register of Historic Places
- U.S. Historic district – Contributing property
- Portland Historic Landmark
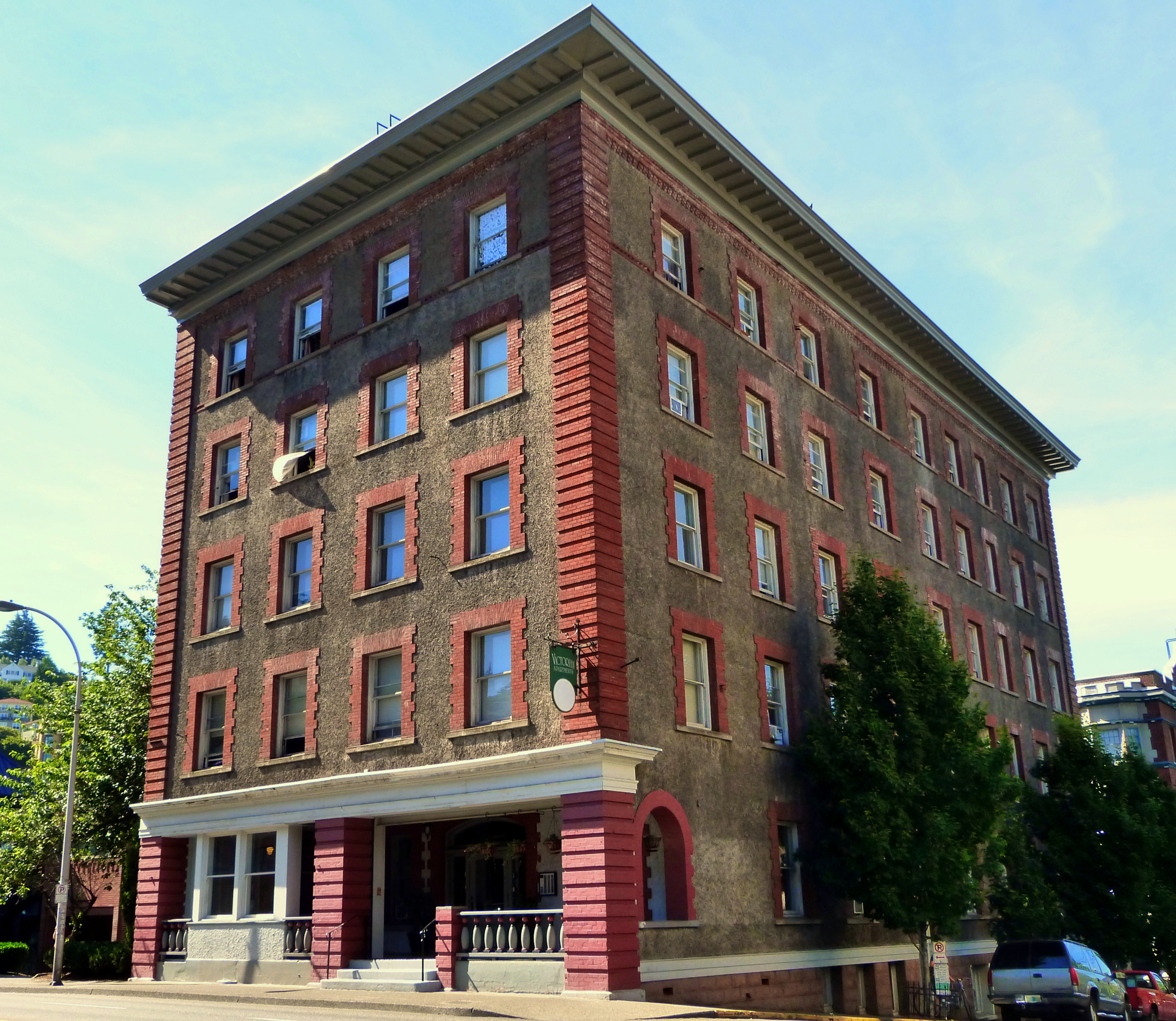
- The Hill Hotel in 2015

- Location within Portland, Oregon
- Location: 2255–2261 W Burnside Street, Portland, Oregon
- Coordinates: 45°31′25″N 122°41′51″W
- Built: 1904
- Architect: Alexander C. Ewart
- Architectural style: American Renaissance
- Part of: Alphabet Historic District (ID00001293)
- NRHP reference No.: 95000690
- Added to NRHP: June 9, 1995

The Hill Hotel is a historic former hotel located in Portland, Oregon, United States, built in 1904. It is listed on the National Register of Historic Places The building is now known as the Victorian Apartments.
