= University of the Ozarks =

Private university in Clarksville, Arkansas, US

- Former names: Cane Hill School (1834–1858); Cane Hill College (1858–1891) Arkansas Cumberland College (1891–1920); College of the Ozarks (1920–1987)
- Type: Private
- Established: 1834; 192 years ago
- Religious affiliation: Presbyterian Church (U.S.A.)
- Academic affiliations: Space-grant
- Endowment: $148.7 million (2025)
- President: Richard L. Dunsworth
- Dean: F. Nichole Sherman
- Faculty: 52
- Students: 872
- Location: Clarksville, Arkansas, United States; 35°28′38″N 93°28′02″W
- Colors: Purple, Grey, White
- Nickname: Ozarks
- Mascot: Eagles
- Website: ozarks.edu
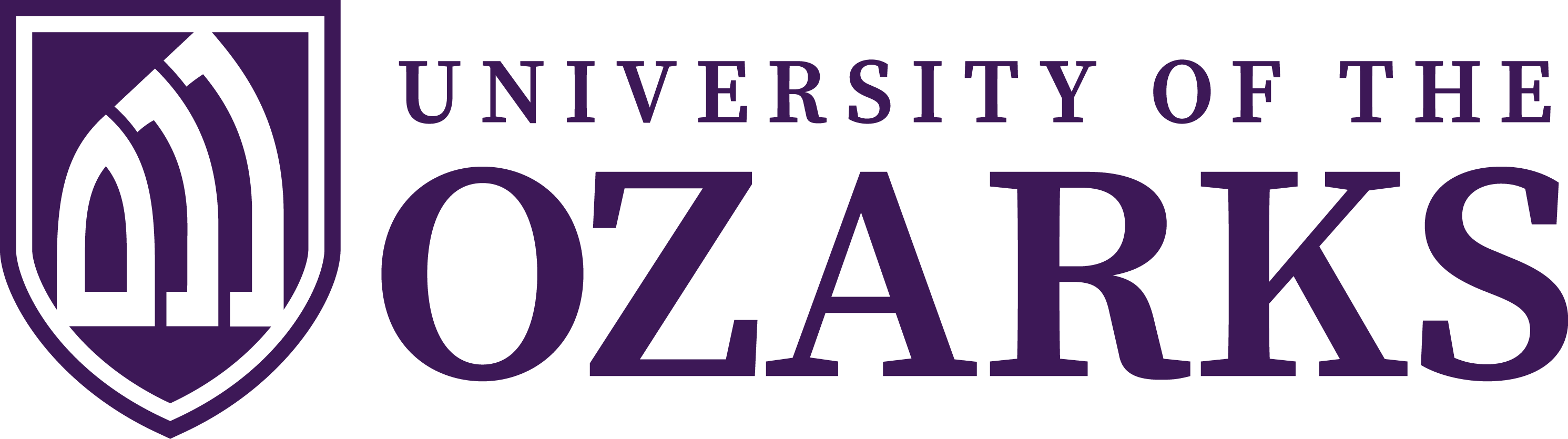

University of the Ozarks (U of O) is a private university in Clarksville, Arkansas, United States. Enrollment averages around 800 students, representing 25 countries. U of O is affiliated with the Presbyterian Church (U.S.A.).

== History ==
University of the Ozarks traces its roots back to 1834, making it the oldest university in Arkansas and one of the oldest institutions of higher education west of the Mississippi River. It was founded by Cumberland Presbyterians in 1834 as Cane Hill School in Cane Hill, Arkansas in Washington County, later becoming Cane Hill College. Its successor, Arkansas Cumberland College, opened in Clarksville in September 1891. The name was changed to College of the Ozarks in 1920. The university alma mater was written in 1928 by Rev. John W. Laird, pastor of the Presbyterian Church of Rochester, New York.

In 1875, the university became the first institution of higher education in Arkansas to admit women. In 1946, the university housed the state's first pharmacy school.

During the years of World War II, the enrollment decreased to the point that the board of trustees decided to find a tenant for the facilities. From January 1944 through May 1945, the United States Navy leased the full campus for operating a Primary School in their Electronics Training Program. An estimated total of 3,000 Navy and Marine servicemen were trained in the three-month course. In this period, classes for the 150 College of the Ozarks students were held off-campus at the First Presbyterian Church; female students were mainly housed in the church's adjoining Manse.

In 1957, the university became the first predominately white university in Arkansas to integrate, and in 1959 the first to graduate an African-American, more than 7 years before any others. In 1963 Ozarks athlete Sylvester Benson became the first African-American to compete in the Arkansas Intercollegiate Conference.

In 1987, the name was changed to University of the Ozarks. The university enrollment has increased significantly since the mid-1990s, and the number of full-time faculty has been increased from 32 to 48. During the past decade, the university's supporters helped increase the school's endowment by 284 percent, contributing more than $100 million for academic programs, scholarships, faculty and staff benefits, and facilities.

In 1998, U of O received the largest single monetary donation ever made to a private university in Arkansas: $39.5 million from the Walton Family Charitable Support Foundation.

== Campus ==
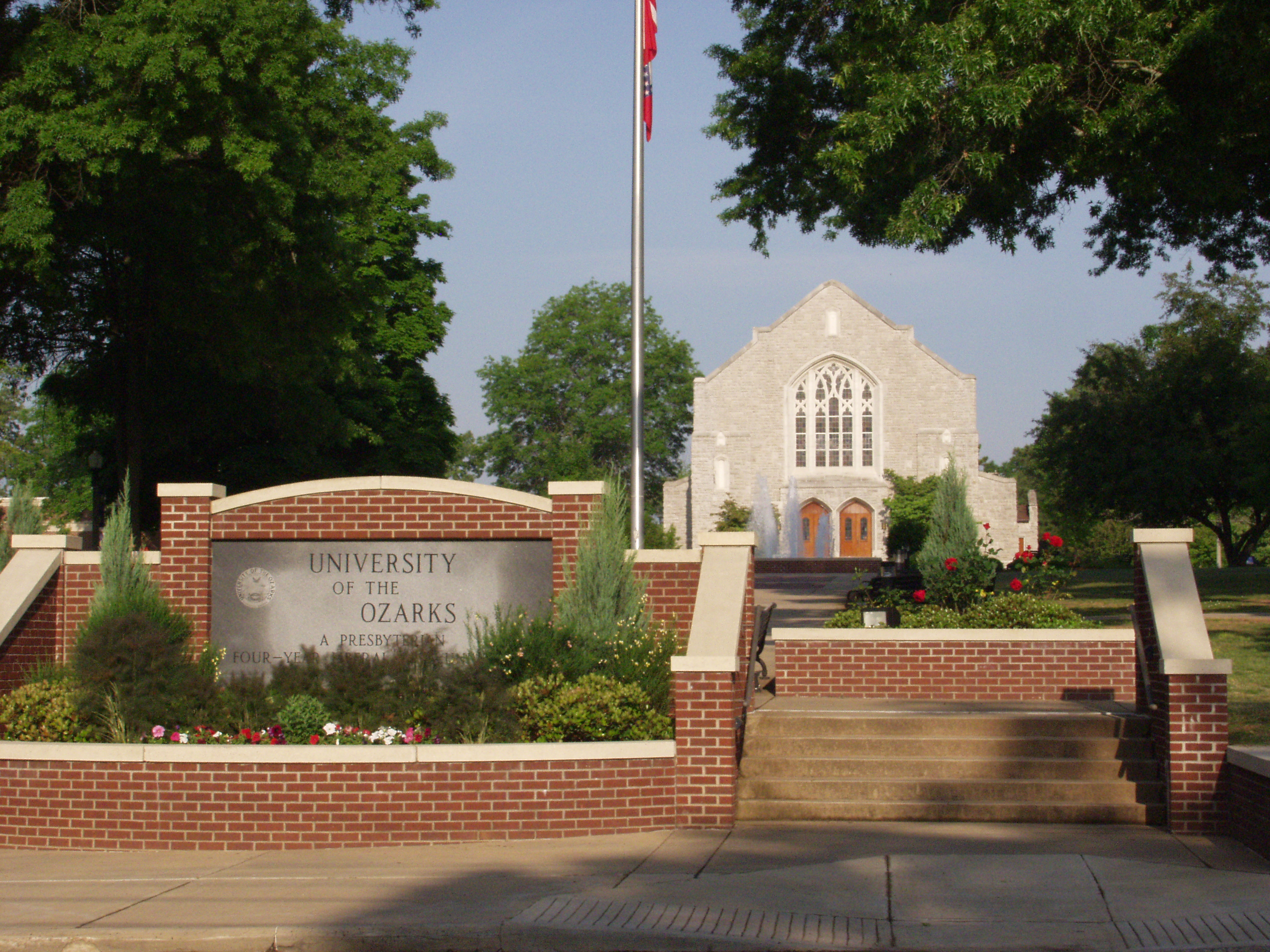
University of the Ozarks campus

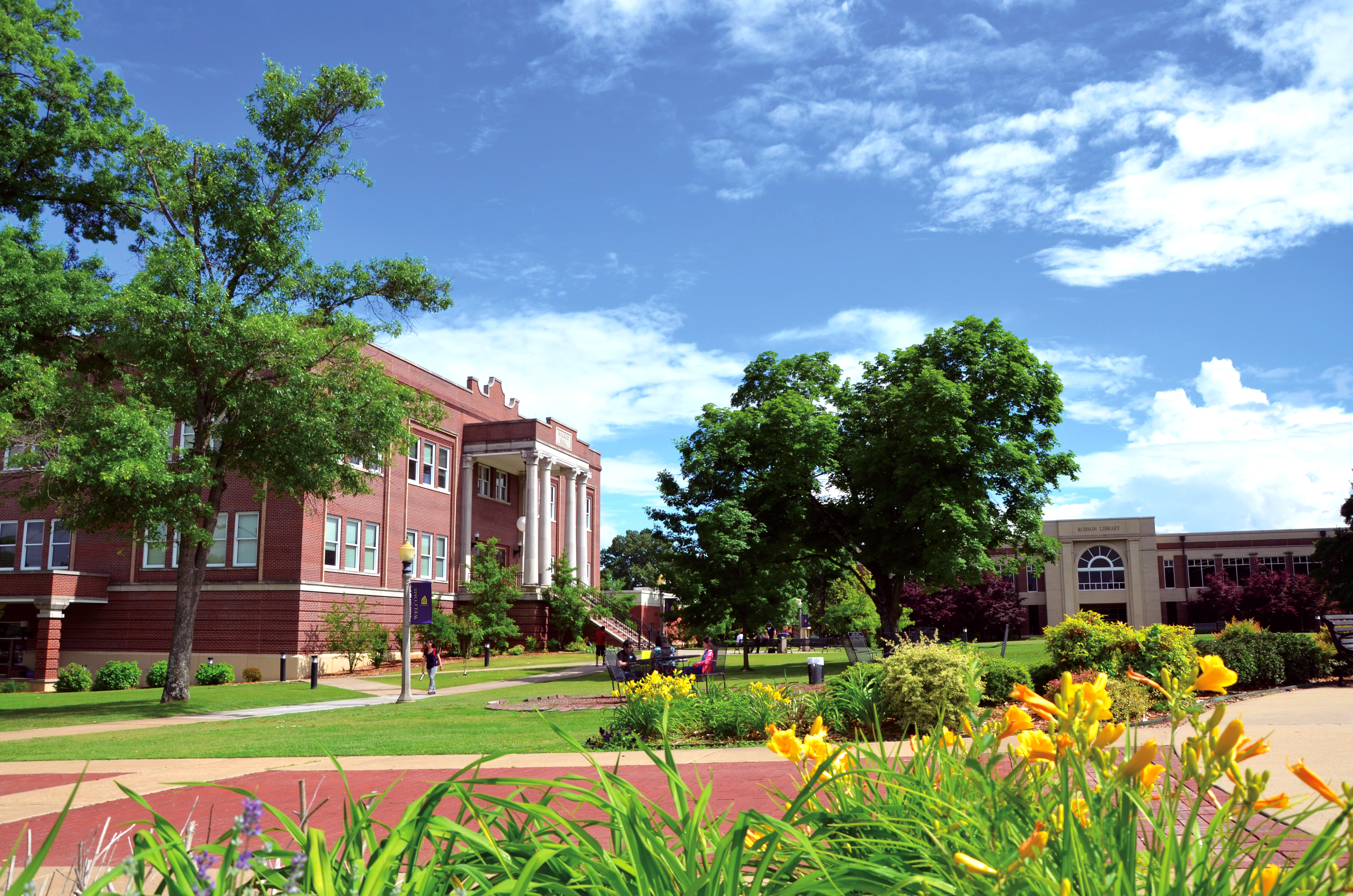
Walker Hall

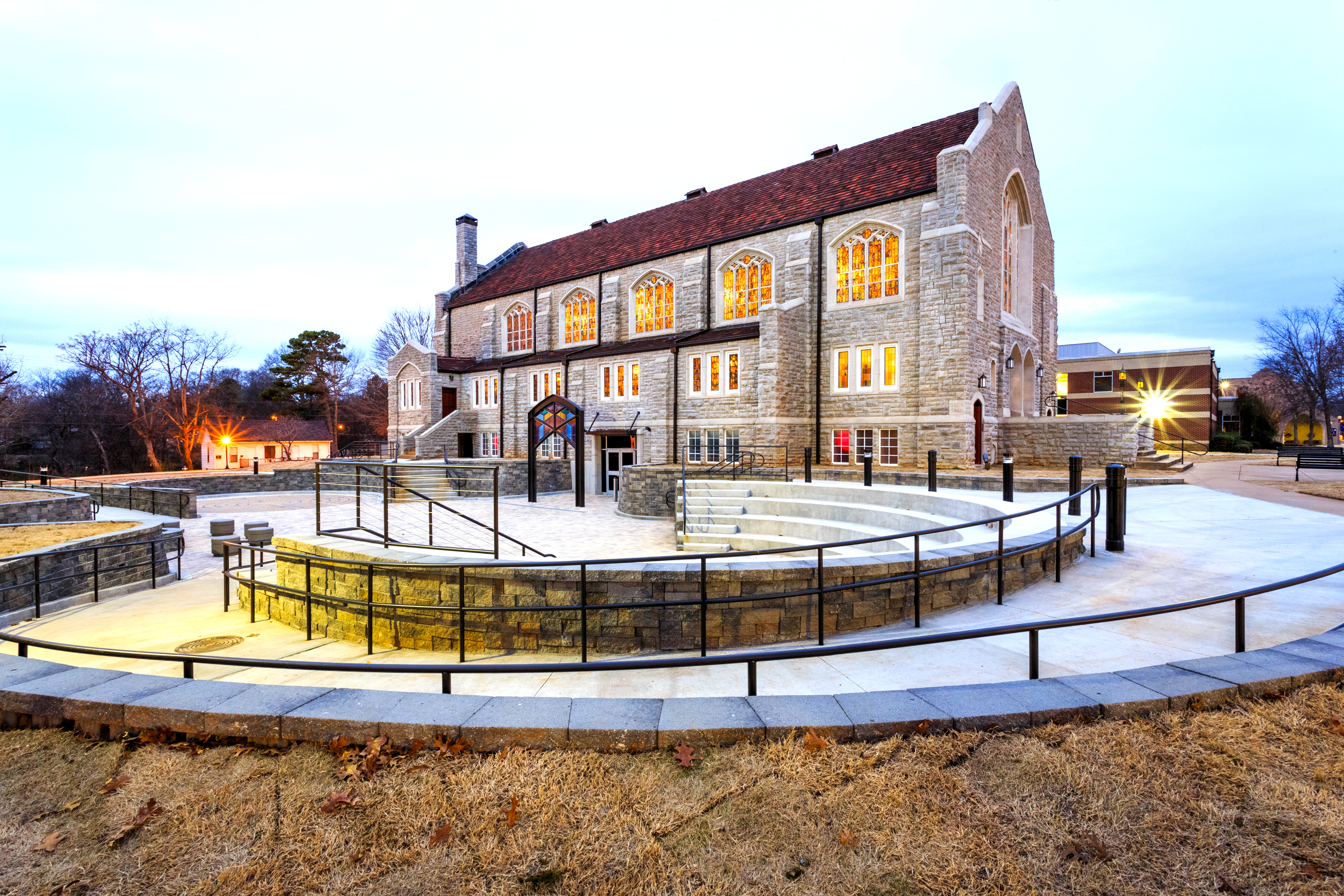
Munger-Wilson Chapel

University of the Ozarks' 30-acre campus, sits at the top of College Hill on the north edge of Clarksville, Arkansas, a town with a population of about 10,000 in the Arkansas River Valley.

The campus has a long history at its current location, dating back to 1891. In the years since the first cornerstone was laid on the site, the campus has undergone continued growth and improvement. There are now more than 20 buildings on campus, with the ten major buildings arranged around a central mall which features a picturesque fountain. The large trees and the classically styled buildings combine to give the campus a distinctive look.

=== MacLean Hall ===
MacLean Hall is a residence hall that is home to up 221 residents (sophomores, juniors, and seniors). It was constructed in 1927 and underwent a $10 million renovation in 2019 that included a fire sprinkler system, new central heat and air systems, an elevator, and new mechanical, electrical and plumbing components as well as additional common areas and laundry facilities. In 2017, MacLean Hall was added to the National Register of Historic Places.

=== Munger-Wilson Memorial Chapel ===
One of the main landmarks of the university is the Raymond Munger Memorial Chapel, erected in 1933. The chapel was built with one of the single largest donations ever received by the college at the time, a $75,000 gift from Miss Jesse Munger of Plainfield, N.J. Munger donated the money to build the chapel in memory of her father, Raymond Munger, a New York businessman who was known for his interest in religion and education. College students were paid to provide much of the labor for excavation, laying of the foundation and hauling of materials. Munger Chapel, which is listed in the National Register of Historic Places, was designed by architect A.O. Clark of Rogers, Arkansas. Built of limestone trimmed with Nu-Carth stone, it is of Gothic design and follows general plans used in large cathedrals. The stained glass windows were designed and installed by The Willet Studios of Philadelphia. The university holds weekly services for the campus community in the chapel. It is also a popular wedding venue. The university celebrated the 75th anniversary of the chapel during a special ceremony during the 2008 Alumni Weekend.

In 2014, the Raymond Munger Memorial Chapel at University of the Ozarks received a $2 million gift from Frances E. Wilson of Tulsa, Oklahoma, for a variety of renovations and improvements that would proceed until December 2015. The university's board of trustees formally accepted the gift at its Spring Board Meeting on April 26, 2014. Wilson made the gift to the university in memory of her late husband, Thomas D. Wilson. In accepting the gift, the board unanimously voted to express its appreciation to Wilson by renaming the building Munger-Wilson Memorial Chapel. The sanctuary and exterior of the Chapel underwent a great deal of restoration and replacement of structural elements to preserve the historic look and spiritual feel of what is an iconic landmark in this area.

== Organization and administration ==
Wiley Lin Hurie served as president of the university during its early days in Clarksville. Hurie led a number of important initiatives during his tenure as president, including the drive to join the North Central Association of Colleges and universities. During the presidency of Wiley Lin Hurie (1923–1949), Ozarks gained a favorable impression throughout the region for its relatively low tuition and fees, and it allayed local concerns about the risks of co-education by enforcing a strict code of moral conduct and discipline.

Under the stewardship of Rick Niece, who began serving in 1997, funding helped propel Ozarks into the twenty-first century with multiple new faculty positions; several new buildings (including the $7 million Walker Hall, completed in 2002); and a stronger system of student recruitment, retention, and support. Niece, who was named the university's 24th president in 1997, stepped down on June 30, 2013, after 16 years of dedicated service and leadership at the helm of the Clarksville, Ark., campus. Only the presidencies of F.R. Earle (1858–1891) and Wiley Lin Hurie (1923–1949) lasted longer in the university's 182-year history.

The University of the Ozarks Board of Trustees elected Richard L. "Rich" Dunsworth, J.D., as the university's 25th president, which was effective July 1, 2013.

== Academics ==
University of the Ozarks offers more than 60 programs of study, along with several pre-professional sequences. The curriculum is based on a liberal arts approach, while also offering strong professional preparation in a number of areas. Students have access to a variety of academic support resources, including the university's Student Success Center.

The university offers students individualized attention and academic advising, with an average class size of 17, and a student/faculty ratio of 15:1.

=== Jones Learning Center ===
The university is also home to the Jones Learning Center, the first program in the country designed specifically to help students with learning disabilities at the college level. For an additional fee, students enrolled in the JLC receive a number of enhanced services designed to help them succeed in their college studies.

=== Enrollment ===
Based on Fall 2018 Fact Sheet

- Students: 872
  - Female: 441 (52%)
  - Male: 431 (48%)
  - Countries Represented: 25
- Student to Faculty Ratio: 15 to 1
- 25/75 Percentile ACT Composite Scores: 20/27
- Average Freshman HS GPA: 3.30

== Student life ==
=== Athletics ===
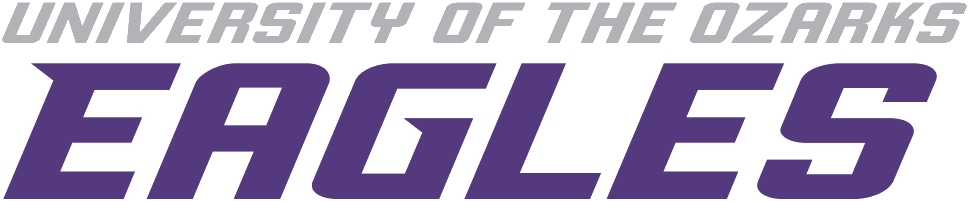
Ozarks athletics wordmark

The University of the Ozarks Eagles are a member of the National Collegiate Athletic Association (NCAA) Division III and compete in the Southern Collegiate Athletic Conference against schools from the states of Arkansas, Colorado, Louisiana, and Texas and are affiliate members of the St. Louis Intercollegiate Athletic Conference for men's wrestling. The university offers competition in baseball, men's and women's basketball, men's and women's cross country, men's and women's soccer, softball, and men's and women's tennis. In 2014, cheer & STUNT, wrestling, and men's and women's indoor and outdoor track were added. In 2016, the university added men's and women's swimming.

The Eagles competed in the Arkansas Intercollegiate Conference of the National Association of Intercollegiate Athletics (NAIA) from 1947 to 1995 and in the American Southwest Conference of NCAA Division III from 1996 to 2024.
