= Clarksville, Arkansas =

- City
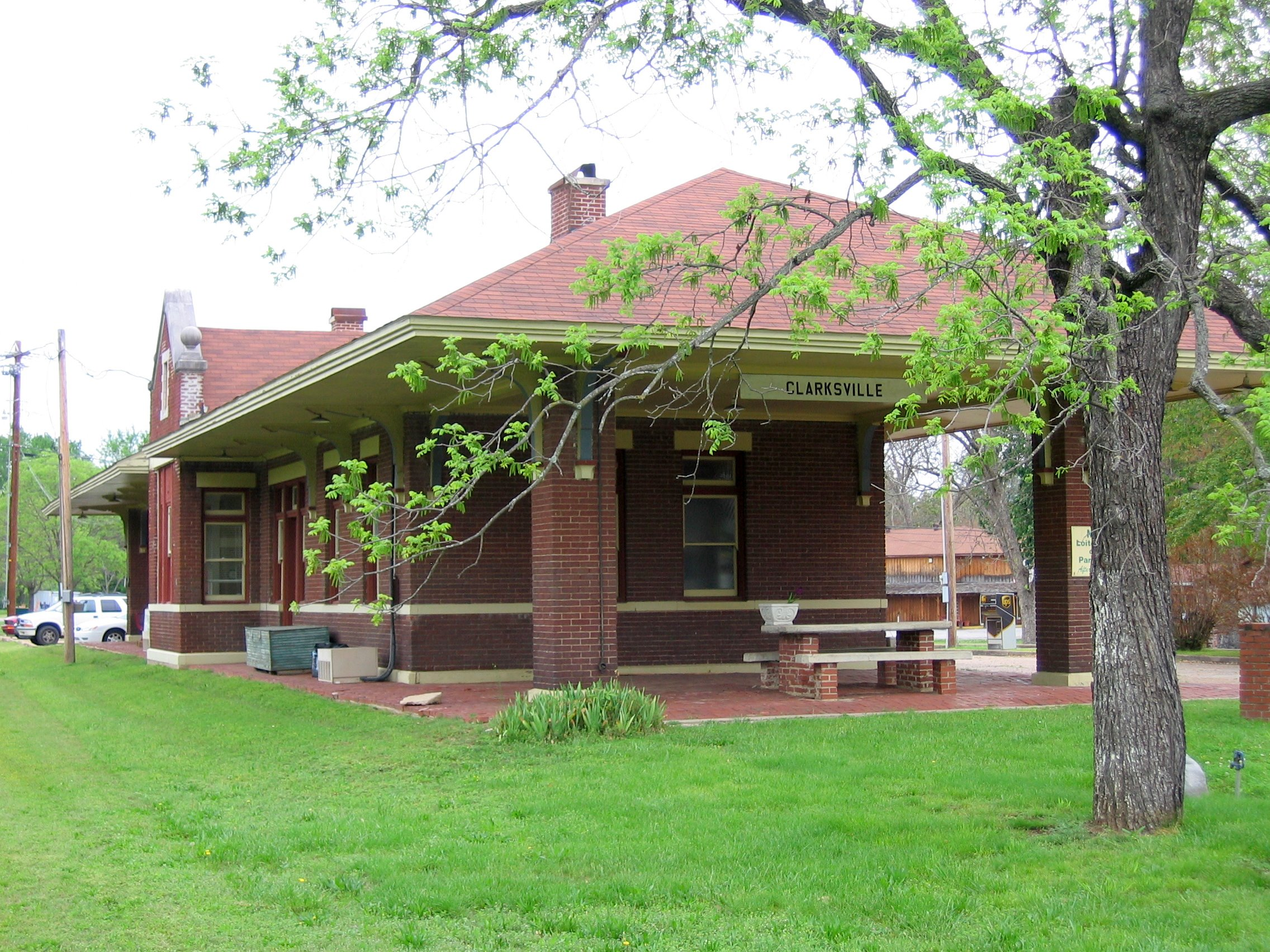
- Old train station in Clarksville

- Location of Clarksville in Johnson County, Arkansas
- Coordinates: 35°27′24″N 93°28′49″W
- Country: United States
- State: Arkansas
- County: Johnson
- Settled: 1819
- Established: November 1836

Area
  - Total: 18.83 sq mi (48.78 km^{2})
  - Land: 18.22 sq mi (47.18 km^{2})
  - Water: 0.62 sq mi (1.60 km^{2})
- Elevation: 367 ft (112 m)

Population (2020)
  - Total: 9,381
  - Estimate (2025): 9,632 ▲
  - Density: 515.0/sq mi (198.83/km^{2})
- Time zone: UTC−06:00 (CST)
  - Summer (DST): UTC−05:00 (CDT)
- ZIP code: 72830
- Area codes: 479
- FIPS code: 05-14140
- GNIS feature ID: 2404060
- Website: www.clarksvillear.gov

Clarksville is a city in Johnson County, Arkansas, United States. As of the 2020 census the population was 9,381, up from 9,178 in 2010. The city is the county seat of Johnson County. It is nestled between the Arkansas River and the foothills of the Ozark Mountains, and Interstate 40 and US Highway 64 intersect within the city limits. Clarksville-Johnson County is widely known for its peaches, scenic byways and abundance of natural outdoor recreational activities.

== History ==
The community began as settlers arrived to the Arkansas Territory. After the Osage tribe was relocated by treaty, Cherokee settlers came to Arkansas by 1800 and primarily lived along the Arkansas River. A federal Indian trading factory under Matthew Lyon was established at Spadra in 1818, now at the west end of Lake Dardanelle on the Arkansas River, a Clarksville location now occupied by Spadra Marina. A historical marker, dedicated in 1984, sits on Spadra Bluff, near the original river town of Spadra. The area was reserved for the Cherokee, so most early settlers of Johnson County did not move into the area until after 1828, the year the Cherokee gave up their land.

Spadra was the first county seat of Johnson County, convenient to steamboat lines. However, when stagecoach and train transportation became more common, land routes from Little Rock to Fort Smith were directed along higher elevations through Clarksville. As Clarksville grew, it became the de facto location for the county seat circa 1833, probably due to severe flooding at Spadra. Clarksville was established by survey in November 1836 after Johnson County was formed from part of Pope County. The first court session was held in 1837 in a private building.

By July 1853 the Little Rock and Fort Smith Railroad opted to go through Clarksville instead of Spadra, due to financial incentives provided by the county commissioners based in Clarksville. Almost twenty miles of track toward Spadra were removed during the realignment. Regular rail service began following the Civil War, aiding in Clarksville's growth, while the hamlet of New Spadra began beside the new tracks. Fewer settlers arrived by river transportation so Spadra was less useful, so its major buildings deteriorated or were moved, while Clarksville became the destination of many new settlers arriving by train.

== Geography ==
Clarksville is located in south-central Johnson County and is bordered to the south by the Arkansas River, although the city center is 3 miles (5 km) north of the river and west of Spadra Creek.

Interstate 40 leads southeast 100 miles (161 km) to Little Rock and west 55 miles (89 km) to Fort Smith.

According to the United States Census Bureau, Clarksville has a total area of 19.2 square miles (49.7 km^{2}), of which 18.5 square miles (47.9 km^{2}) are land and 0.69 square miles (1.8 km^{2}), or 3.66%, are water.

== Demographics ==
Historical population
| Census | Pop. | Note | %± |
|---|---|---|---|
| 1850 | 398 | | — |
| 1860 | 316 | | −20.6% |
| 1870 | 466 | | 47.5% |
| 1880 | 656 | | 40.8% |
| 1890 | 937 | | 42.8% |
| 1900 | 1,086 | | 15.9% |
| 1910 | 1,456 | | 34.1% |
| 1920 | 2,127 | | 46.1% |
| 1930 | 3,031 | | 42.5% |
| 1940 | 3,118 | | 2.9% |
| 1950 | 4,343 | | 39.3% |
| 1960 | 3,919 | | −9.8% |
| 1970 | 4,616 | | 17.8% |
| 1980 | 5,237 | | 13.5% |
| 1990 | 5,833 | | 11.4% |
| 2000 | 7,719 | | 32.3% |
| 2010 | 9,178 | | 18.9% |
| 2020 | 9,381 | | 2.2% |
| 2025 (est.) | 9,632 | ▲ | 2.7% |
U.S. Decennial Census; 2014 Estimate

=== 2020 census ===
As of the 2020 census, there were 9,381 people, 3,470 households, and 2,116 families residing in the city. The median age was 34.0 years. 26.2% of residents were under the age of 18 and 15.4% were 65 years of age or older. For every 100 females, there were 94.5 males, and for every 100 females age 18 and over there were 90.8 males age 18 and over.

82.8% of residents lived in urban areas, while 17.2% lived in rural areas.

Of the 3,470 households in the city, 34.9% had children under the age of 18 living in them. Of all households, 40.5% were married-couple households, 19.8% were households with a male householder and no spouse or partner present, and 32.4% were households with a female householder and no spouse or partner present. About 31.3% of all households were made up of individuals, and 13.5% had someone living alone who was 65 years of age or older.

There were 3,946 housing units, of which 12.1% were vacant. The homeowner vacancy rate was 2.8% and the rental vacancy rate was 12.6%.

Clarksville racial composition
| Race | Number | Percentage |
|---|---|---|
| White (non-Hispanic) | 5,500 | 58.63% |
| Black or African American (non-Hispanic) | 369 | 3.93% |
| Native American | 53 | 0.56% |
| Asian | 706 | 7.53% |
| Pacific Islander | 22 | 0.23% |
| Other/Mixed | 425 | 4.53% |
| Hispanic or Latino | 2,306 | 24.58% |

=== 2000 census ===
As of the census of 2000, there were 7,719 people, 2,960 households, and 1,918 families residing in the city. The population density was 429.3 inhabitants per square mile (165.8/km^{2}). There were 3,240 housing units at an average density of 180.2 per square mile (69.6/km^{2}). The racial makeup of the city was 87.60% White, 3.46% Black or African American, 0.44% Native American, 0.47% Asian, 0.03% Pacific Islander, 6.15% from other races, and 1.85% from two or more races. 15.26% of the population were Hispanic or Latino of any race.

There were 2,960 households, out of which 30.6% had children under the age of 18 living with them, 50.0% were married couples living together, 11.3% had a female householder with no husband present, and 35.2% were non-families. 30.0% of all households were made up of individuals, and 15.6% had someone living alone who was 65 years of age or older. The average household size was 2.43 and the average family size was 3.01.

In the city, the population was spread out, with 23.9% under the age of 18, 12.5% from 18 to 24, 27.3% from 25 to 44, 20.0% from 45 to 64, and 16.3% who were 65 years of age or older. The median age was 35 years. For every 100 females, there were 92.8 males. For every 100 females age 18 and over, there were 89.2 males.

The median income for a household in the city was $24,548, and the median income for a family was $30,758. Males had a median income of $22,052 versus $19,764 for females. The per capita income for the city was $16,305. About 16.2% of families and 20.3% of the population were below the poverty line, including 24.8% of those under age 18 and 13.4% of those age 65 or over.

== Education ==
The Arkansas Cumberland College opened on 8 September 1891 in Clarksville. The privately founded educational institution was renamed the College of the Ozarks in 1920 and became the University of the Ozarks in 1987. The University of the Ozarks is a private, liberal arts based university affiliated with the Presbyterian Church (USA).

Clarksville School District is the city's public school district. Its mascot is a panther. The school colors are red and white. The school system is broken up into six different categories: Primary (K-1), Elementary (2nd-3rd), Intermediate (4th-5th), Middle (6th-7th), Junior High (8th-9th), and High School (10th-12th).

In 2011, Clarksville became the first school district in the state of Arkansas to issue every student in the 7th through 12th grades their own take home laptop computer. In 2022, Intermediate, 4th grade and 5th grade, were introduced to the school district.

The Clarksville School District has a graduation rate of over 92%.

== Culture ==
Clarksville is home to the Johnson County Peach Festival. Starting in 1938. It is a nearly week long event (starts on a Tuesday and ends on Saturday) and attracts visitors from all over the country. Activities and events include Barbershop chorus, gospel music, good ol' home cookin, handmade arts and crafts, street dance, frog jumping contest, terrapin derby, greased pig chase, a 4-mile run, parade, jam and jelly bake-off and of course peach and peach cobbler eating contests. It all concludes with the crowning of Queen Elberta, Miss Arkansas Valley and Miss Teen Arkansas Valley pageants.

The Clarksville post office contains a mural, How Happy was the Occasion, painted in 1941 by Mary May Purser. Federally commissioned murals were produced from 1934 to 1943 in the United States through the Section of Painting and Sculpture, later called the Section of Fine Arts, of the Treasury Department.

== Tornado ==
Clarksville was struck by an EF4 tornado on May 25, 2011. Rogers Avenue sustained damage including signs blown down, many building facades damaged and numerous trees broken in half. Areas along and near East Main Street and Poplar Street sustained heavy structural damage, including several heavily damaged homes and apartment buildings. There were three fatalities in rural Johnson County during this storm.

== Climate ==
The climate in this area is characterized by hot, humid summers and generally mild to cool winters. According to the Köppen Climate Classification system, Clarksville has a humid subtropical climate, abbreviated "Cfa" on climate maps.

Climate data for Clarksville, Arkansas
| Month | Jan | Feb | Mar | Apr | May | Jun | Jul | Aug | Sep | Oct | Nov | Dec | Year |
|---|---|---|---|---|---|---|---|---|---|---|---|---|---|
| Record high °F (°C) | 79 (26) | 87 (31) | 92 (33) | 94 (34) | 93 (34) | 103 (39) | 112 (44) | 109 (43) | 105 (41) | 99 (37) | 86 (30) | 81 (27) | 112 (44) |
| Mean daily maximum °F (°C) | 48 (9) | 55 (13) | 63 (17) | 72 (22) | 79 (26) | 87 (31) | 92 (33) | 92 (33) | 85 (29) | 74 (23) | 61 (16) | 51 (11) | 72 (22) |
| Mean daily minimum °F (°C) | 25 (−4) | 29 (−2) | 37 (3) | 45 (7) | 55 (13) | 64 (18) | 68 (20) | 66 (19) | 59 (15) | 46 (8) | 36 (2) | 28 (−2) | 47 (8) |
| Record low °F (°C) | −11 (−24) | 0 (−18) | 9 (−13) | 20 (−7) | 34 (1) | 44 (7) | 50 (10) | 46 (8) | 36 (2) | 20 (−7) | 7 (−14) | −9 (−23) | −11 (−24) |
| Average precipitation inches (mm) | 2.74 (70) | 3.09 (78) | 4.50 (114) | 4.48 (114) | 5.21 (132) | 4.16 (106) | 2.90 (74) | 2.58 (66) | 3.88 (99) | 4.13 (105) | 5.08 (129) | 4.46 (113) | 47.21 (1,200) |
Source: Weather Channel

== Notable people ==
The following list includes notable people who were born or have lived in Clarksville, in alphabetical order by last name.

- Zane Beck (1927–1985), Steel Guitar Hall of Fame member (1991), Pedal steel guitarist and guitar manufacturer.
- Bill Doolin (1858–1896), Old West outlaw born in Clarksville
- Gordon Houston (1916–1942), born in Clarksville, the first professional baseball player to die during active duty in World War II.
- Ralphie May (1972–2017), comedian raised in Clarksville
- Pierce McKennon (1919–1947), World War II flying ace
