= Alder Creek (Mariposa County, California) =

Stream in California, USA

Alder Creek Tributary to South Fork Merced River
- Location of Alder Creek mouth Alder Creek (Mariposa County, California) (the United States)

Location
- Country: United States
- State: California
- County: Mariposa

Physical characteristics
- Source: Bridleveil Creek divide
  - location: about 3 miles southeast of Badger Pass Ski Area
  - coordinates: 37°38′28″N 119°37′46″W
  - elevation: 7,520 ft (2,290 m)
- Mouth: South Fork Merced River
  - location: about 6 miles northwest of Winona, California
  - coordinates: 37°34′37″N 119°41′55″W
  - elevation: 3,457 ft (1,054 m)
- Length: 6.50 mi (10.46 km)
- Basin size: 14.89 square miles (38.6 km^{2})
- Discharge
  - location: South Fork Merced River
  - average: 20.37 cu ft/s (0.577 m^{3}/s) at mouth with South Fork Merced River

Basin features
- Progression: South Fork Merced River → Merced River → San Joaquin River → Suisun Bay → San Francisco Bay → Pacific Ocean
- River system: Merced River
- Tributaries
  - left: unnamed tributaries
  - right: unnamed tributaries
- Bridges: Wawona Road

Alder Creek is a stream in Mariposa County, California, in the United States. It is a tributary of the South Fork Merced River.

Alder Creek was likely named after Alnus rhombifolia, also known as alder.

== Course ==
Alder Creek rises about 3 miles southeast of Badger Pass Ski Area in Mariposa County, California, and then flows southwest to join South Fork Merced River about 6 miles northwest of Wawona.

== Watershed ==
Alder Creek drains 14.89 square miles (38.6 km^{2}) of area, receives about 45.6 in/year of precipitation, has a wetness index of 308.92, and is about 92% forested.

== See also ==
- List of rivers of California
