= Red Peak (Madera County, California) =

Mountain in Yosemite National Park

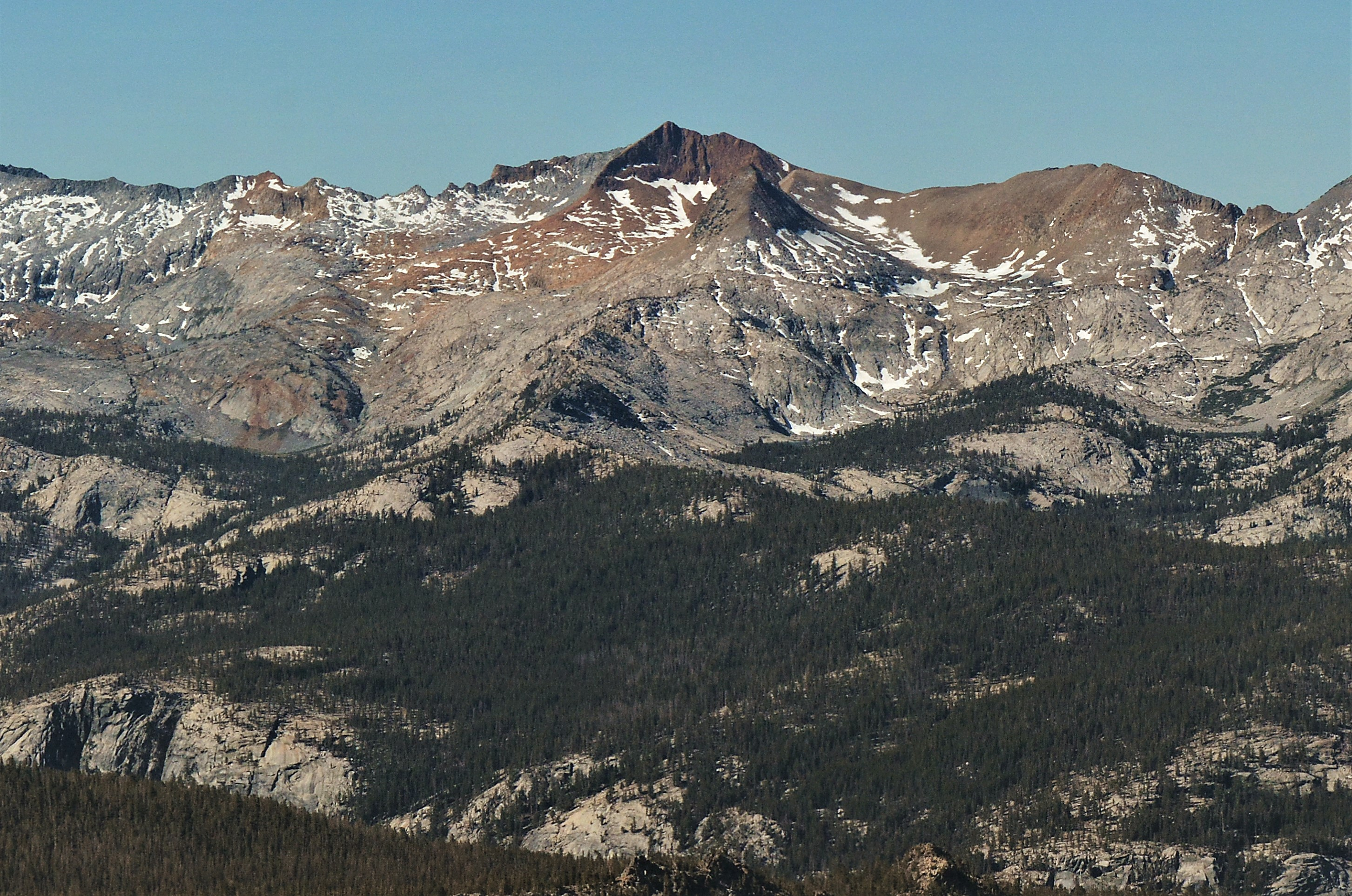
- From the north-northeast

Highest point
- Elevation: 11,699 ft (3,566 m)
- Prominence: 539 ft (164 m)
- Parent peak: Merced Peak (11,731 ft)
- Isolation: 1.52 mi (2.45 km)
- Listing: Sierra Peaks Section
- Coordinates: 37°39′13″N 119°24′34″W

Geography
- Location within California Location within the United States
- Location: Yosemite National Park; Madera County; California, U.S.
- Parent range: Sierra Nevada; Clark Range
- Topo map: USGS Merced Peak

Geology
- Rock age: Cretaceous
- Mountain type: Fault block
- Rock type: Metamorphic rock

Climbing
- Easiest route: class 2

Red Peak is an 11,699-foot-elevation (3,566-meter) mountain summit located in the Sierra Nevada mountain range, in Madera County of northern California, United States. It is situated in Yosemite National Park, approximately 10.5 miles (16.9 km) southeast of Yosemite Valley, 1.5 miles (2.4 km) south-southeast of Gray Peak, and 1.5 miles (2.4 km) northwest of Merced Peak, the nearest higher neighbor. Red Peak is the second-highest peak in the Clark Range, which is a subset of the Sierra Nevada. This geographical feature's brilliant color is caused by iron-bearing minerals weathered to an iron rust which colors the granite.

== History ==
The peak's name originated as "Red Mountain" as it was called by the Whitney Survey. The Red Peak name was officially adopted in 1932 by the U.S. Board on Geographic Names. The California Geological Survey had climbed this peak by 1870, and in 1920 Ansel Adams placed a Sierra Club cylinder-type register at the summit.

== Climate ==
According to the Köppen climate classification system, Red Peak is located in an alpine climate zone. Most weather fronts originate in the Pacific Ocean, and travel east toward the Sierra Nevada mountains. As fronts approach, they are forced upward by the peaks, causing them to drop their moisture in the form of rain or snowfall onto the range (orographic lift). Precipitation runoff from this mountain drains into tributaries of the Merced River.

== See also ==
- List of mountain peaks of California

== Gallery ==
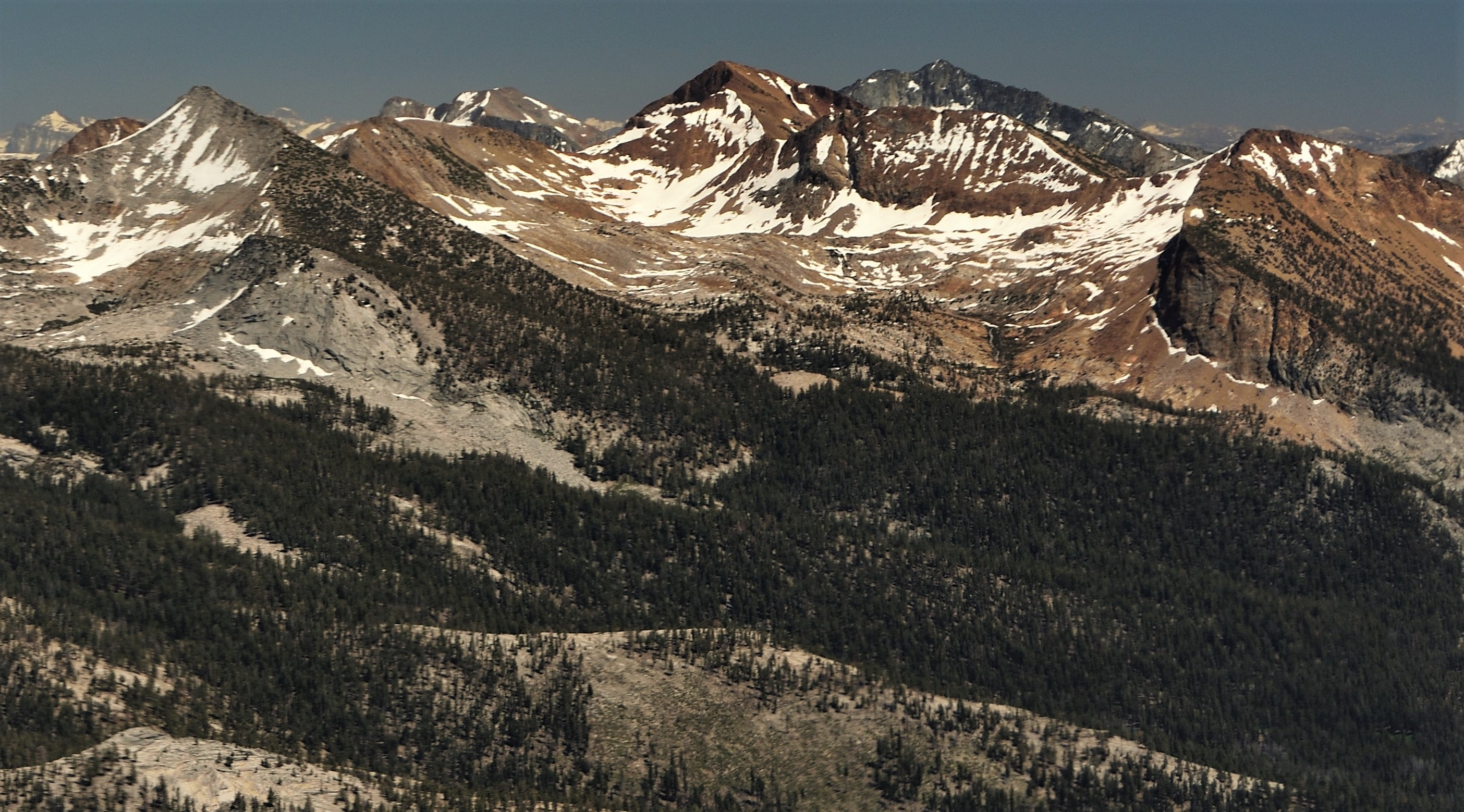
Aerial view of Red Peak. Merced Peak (behind), Gray Peak (left), from northwest

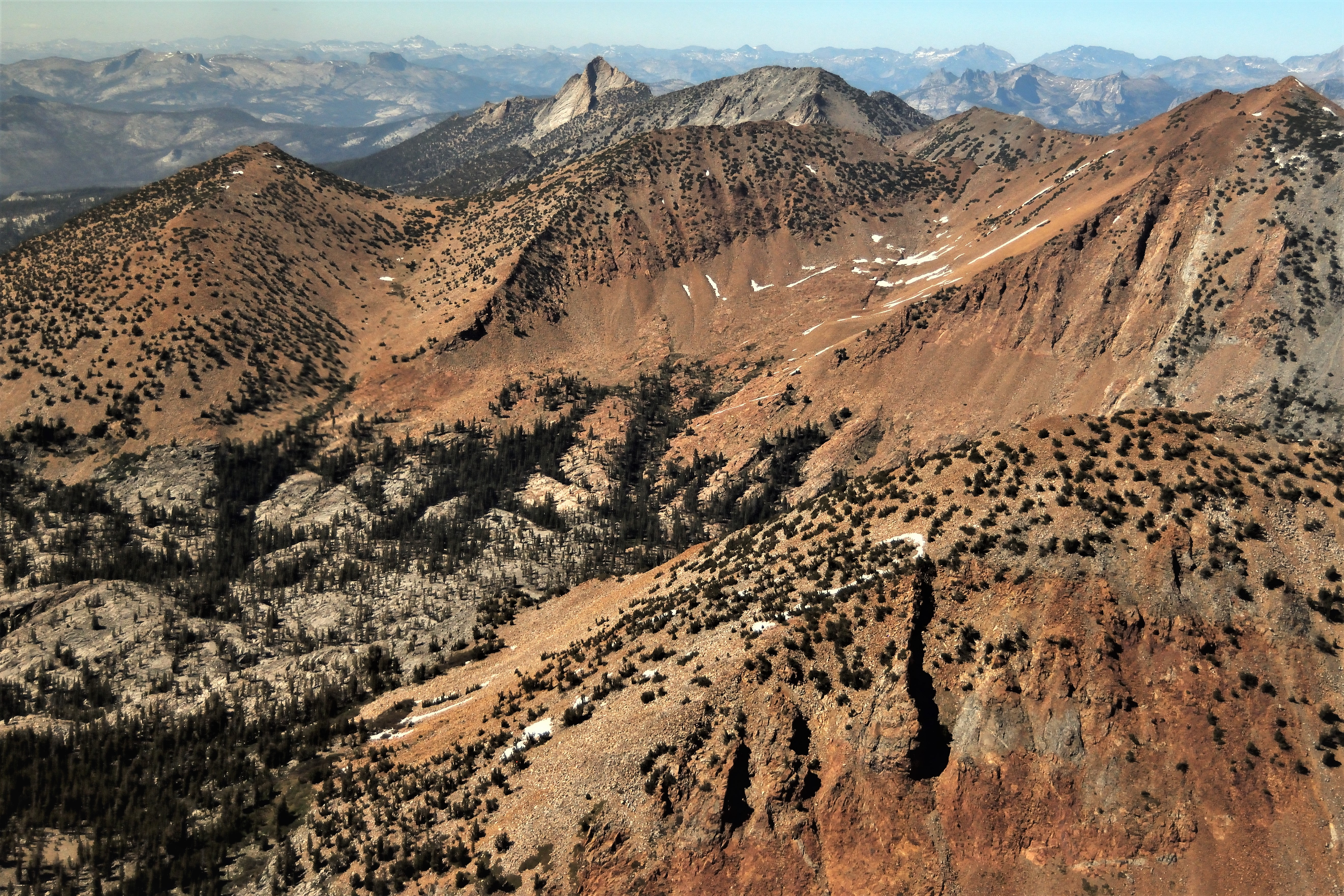
Aerial view from the south, Red Peak summit upper right.
Gray Peak and Mt. Clark centered at top.

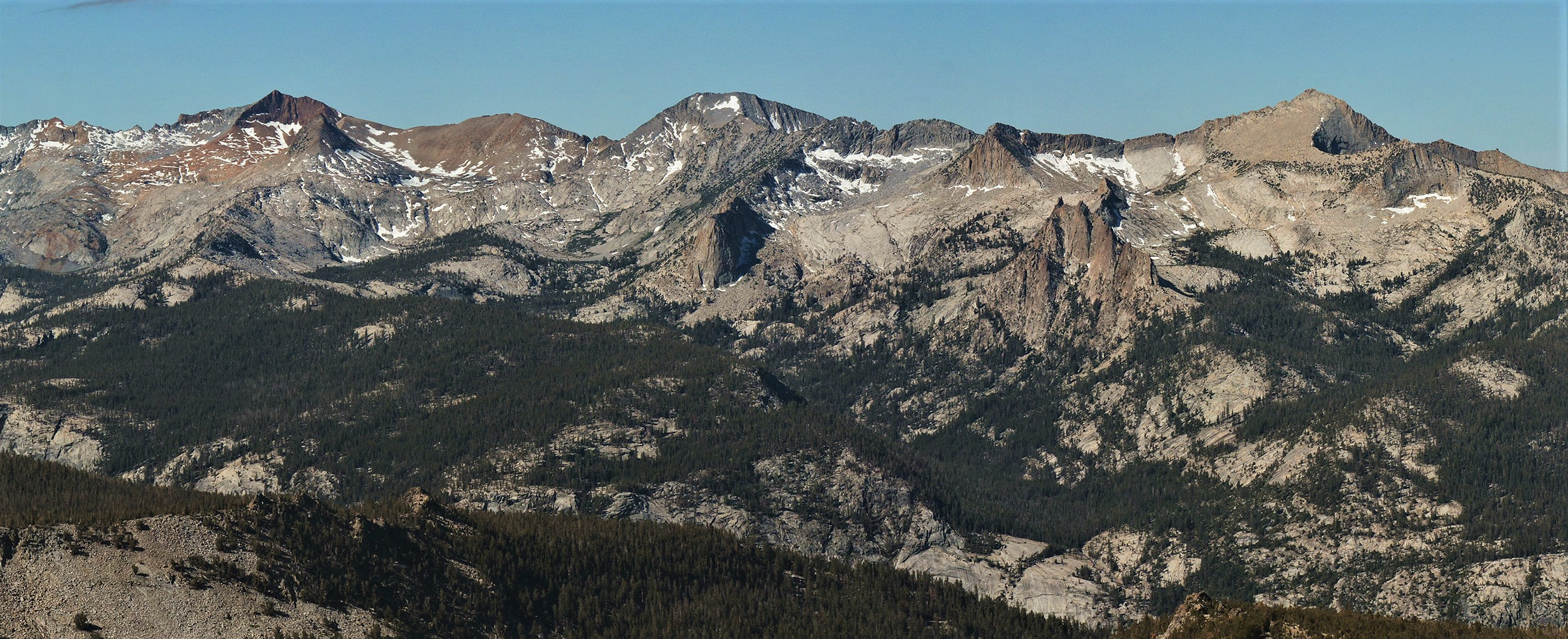
Red Peak (left). Gray Peak (center), Mount Clark (right). From northeast.

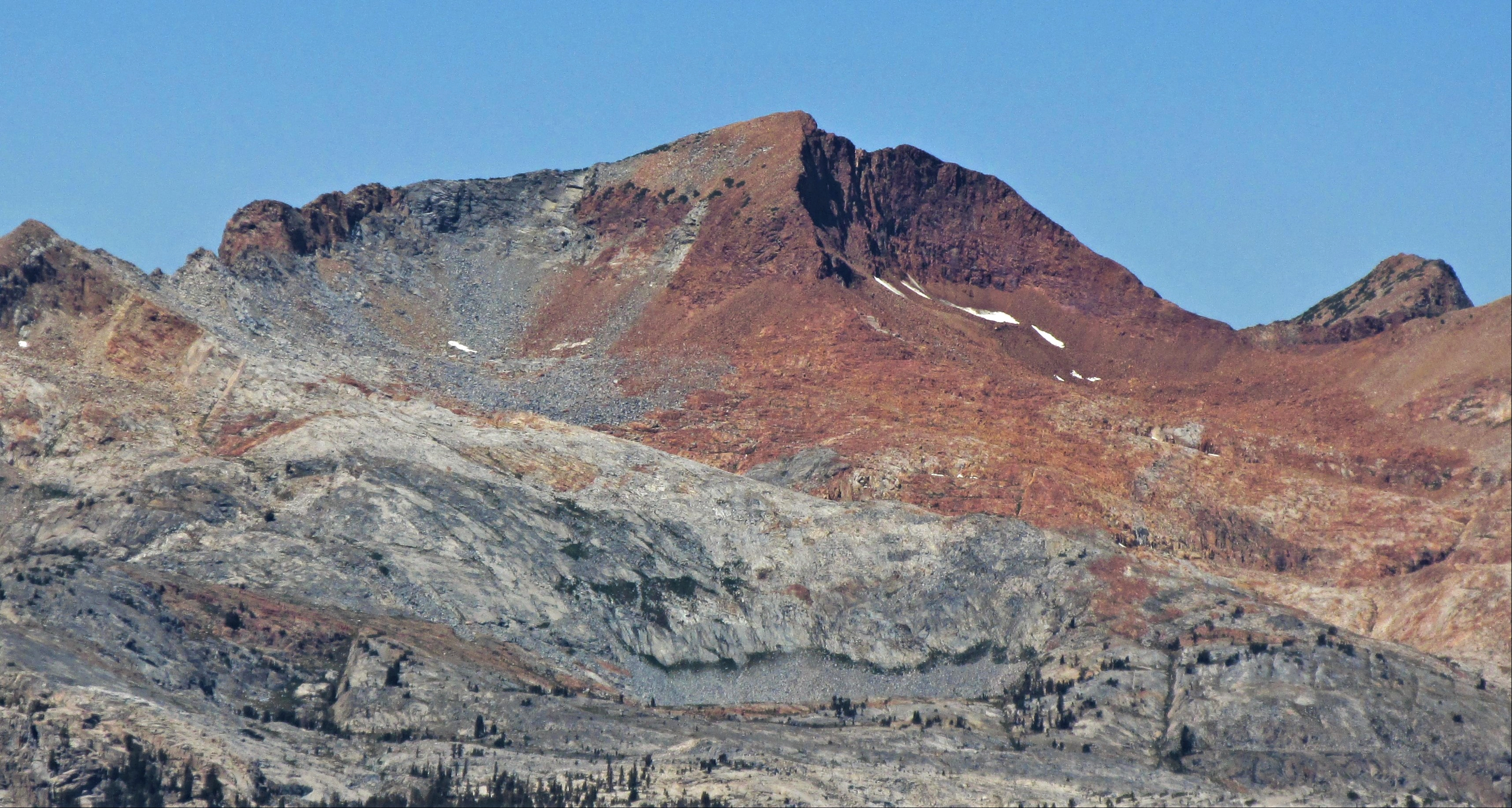
East aspect
