= Merced Peak =

Mountain in the American state of California

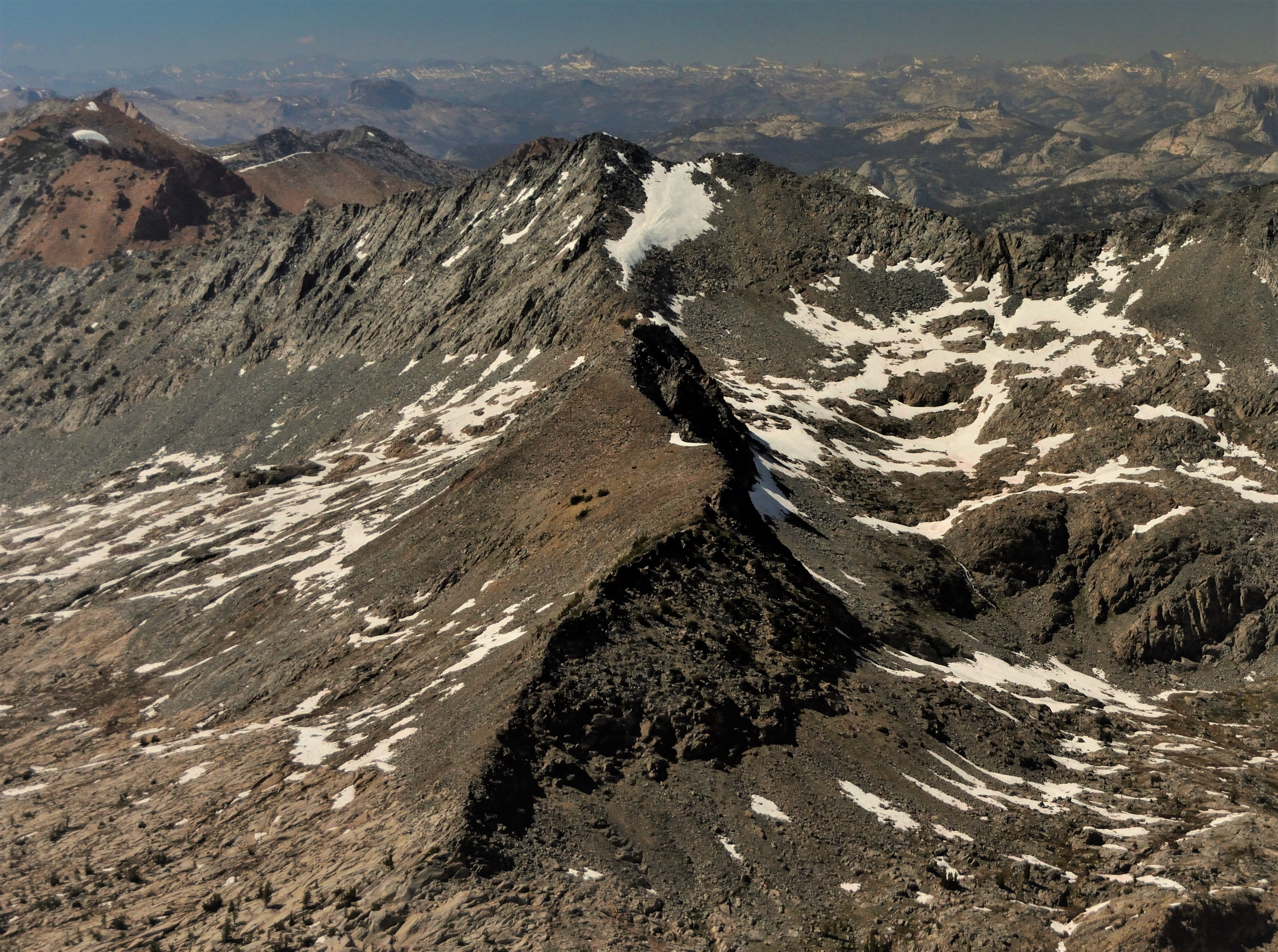
- South aspect, aerial view

Highest point
- Elevation: 11,731 ft (3,576 m) NAVD 88
- Prominence: 1,206 ft (368 m)
- Listing: Sierra Peaks Section
- Coordinates: 37°38′07″N 119°23′41″W

Geography
- Location within California Location within the United States
- Location: Madera County, California, U.S.
- Parent range: Clark Range
- Topo map: USGS Merced Peak

Climbing
- Easiest route: Scramble, class 2

Merced Peak, with an elevation of 11,731 feet (3,576 m), is the highest point in the Clark Range, just surpassing three other peaks; Red Peak (11,704 feet), Gray Peak (11,578 feet), and Mount Clark (11,527 feet).

Merced Peak is located close to southern border of Yosemite National Park, near the Ottoway Lakes. The summit can be approached from the Quartz Mountain Trailhead over Chiquito pass or from one of two trailheads on the road to Glacier Point.

In 1871, influential Scottish-American naturalist John Muir discovered an active alpine glacier below Merced Peak, which helped his theory that Yosemite Valley was formed by glacial action gain acceptance.

== Climate ==
According to the Köppen climate classification system, Merced Peak is located in an alpine climate zone. Most weather fronts originate in the Pacific Ocean, and travel east toward the Sierra Nevada mountains. As fronts approach, they are forced upward by the peaks (orographic lift), causing moisture in the form of rain or snowfall to drop onto the range.

Climate data for Merced Peak (CA) 37.6362 N, 119.3897 W, Elevation: 11,165 ft (3,403 m) (1991–2020 normals)
Month	Jan	Feb	Mar	Apr	May	Jun	Jul	Aug	Sep	Oct	Nov	Dec	Year
Mean daily maximum °F (°C)	32.7 (0.4)	31.9 (−0.1)	34.8 (1.6)	37.9 (3.3)	45.1 (7.3)	54.8 (12.7)	62.9 (17.2)	62.0 (16.7)	56.6 (13.7)	47.7 (8.7)	38.7 (3.7)	32.7 (0.4)	44.8 (7.1)
Daily mean °F (°C)	23.9 (−4.5)	22.1 (−5.5)	24.5 (−4.2)	27.3 (−2.6)	34.0 (1.1)	43.5 (6.4)	51.1 (10.6)	50.4 (10.2)	45.0 (7.2)	37.0 (2.8)	28.9 (−1.7)	23.5 (−4.7)	34.3 (1.3)
Mean daily minimum °F (°C)	15.2 (−9.3)	12.3 (−10.9)	14.2 (−9.9)	16.6 (−8.6)	23.0 (−5.0)	32.3 (0.2)	39.2 (4.0)	38.8 (3.8)	33.4 (0.8)	26.4 (−3.1)	19.2 (−7.1)	14.2 (−9.9)	23.7 (−4.6)
Average precipitation inches (mm)	12.16 (309)	10.66 (271)	9.43 (240)	5.30 (135)	3.36 (85)	0.89 (23)	0.61 (15)	0.52 (13)	0.79 (20)	3.31 (84)	5.25 (133)	10.75 (273)	63.03 (1,601)
Source: PRISM Climate Group

== See also ==
- Intrusive Suite of Merced Peak

== Gallery ==
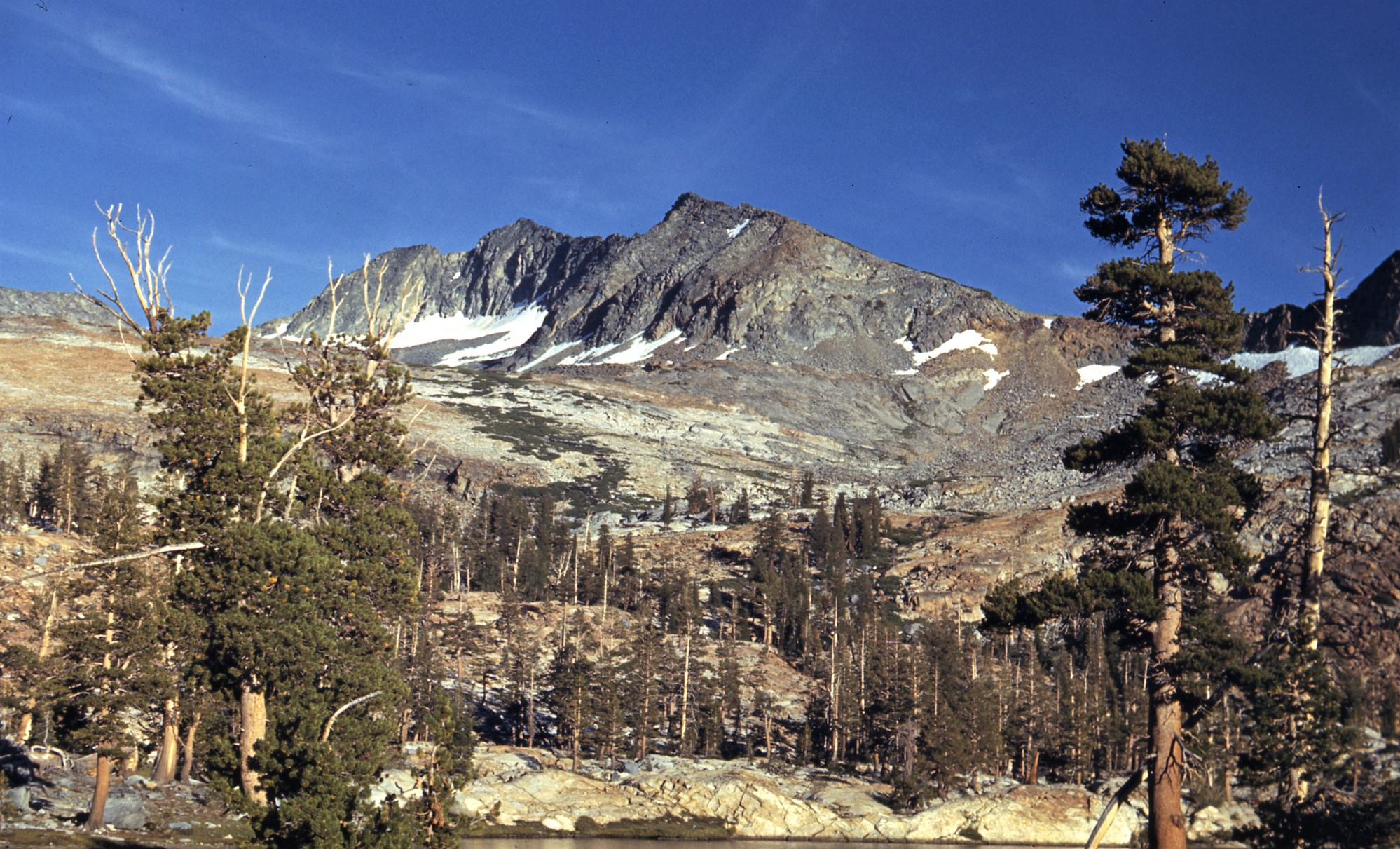
Merced Peak, west aspect

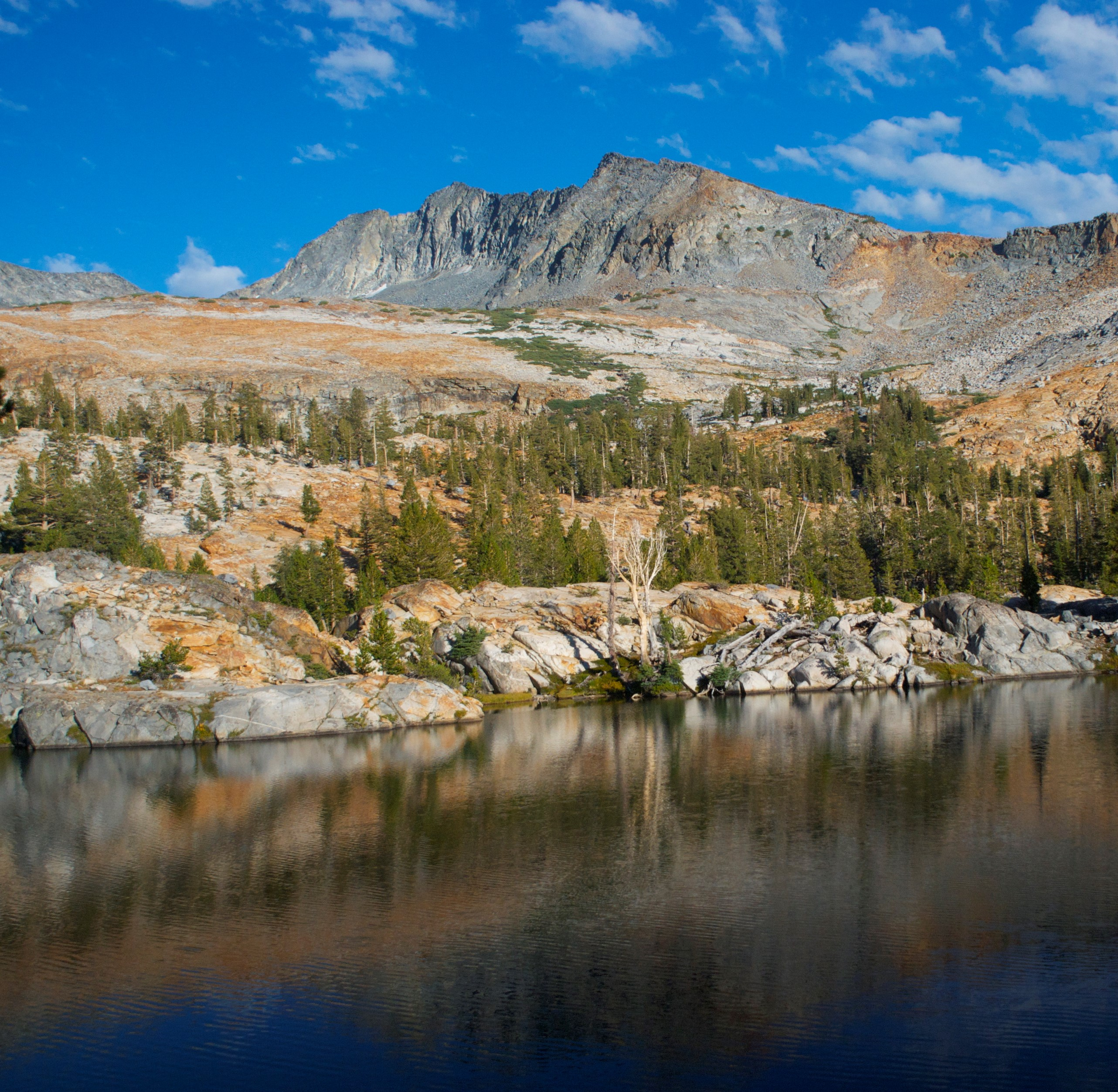
Merced Peak seen from Ottoway Lake
