= Triple Divide Peak =

Triple Divide Peak may refer to:

- Triple Divide Peak (Madera County, California)
- Triple Divide Peak (Montana) in Glacier National Park
- Triple Divide Peak (Tulare County, California)
