= Clark Range (California) =

Subrange of California's Sierra Nevada, in Yosemite National Park

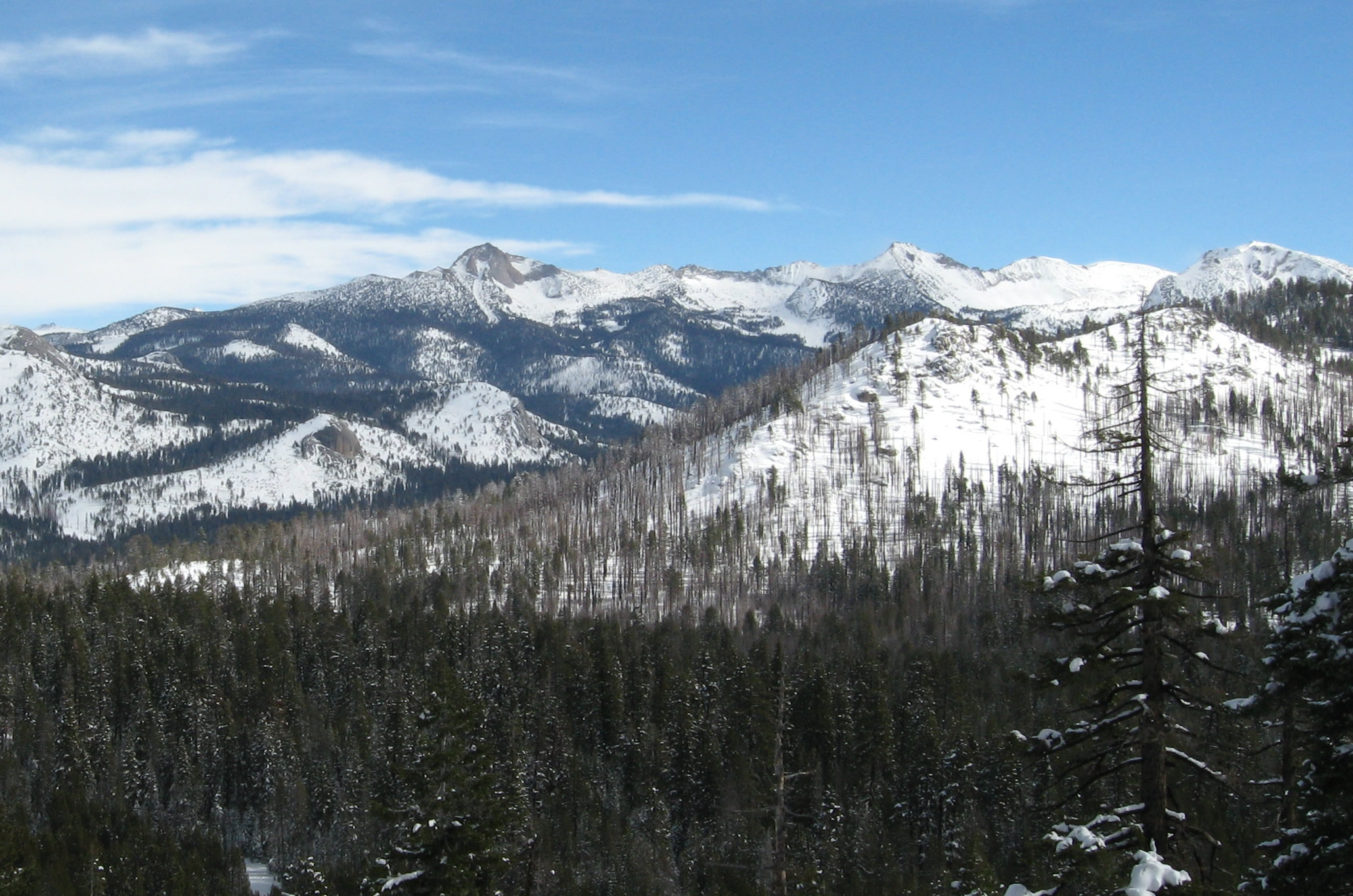
- The range from the west, January 2008. Prominent peaks, from left to right, are Mount Clark, Gray Peak, and Red Peak; the bump on Clark's left side is Quartzite Peak.

Highest point
- Peak: Merced Peak
- Elevation: 11,726 ft (3,574 m)
- Coordinates: 37°43′0″N 119°22′12″W

Geography
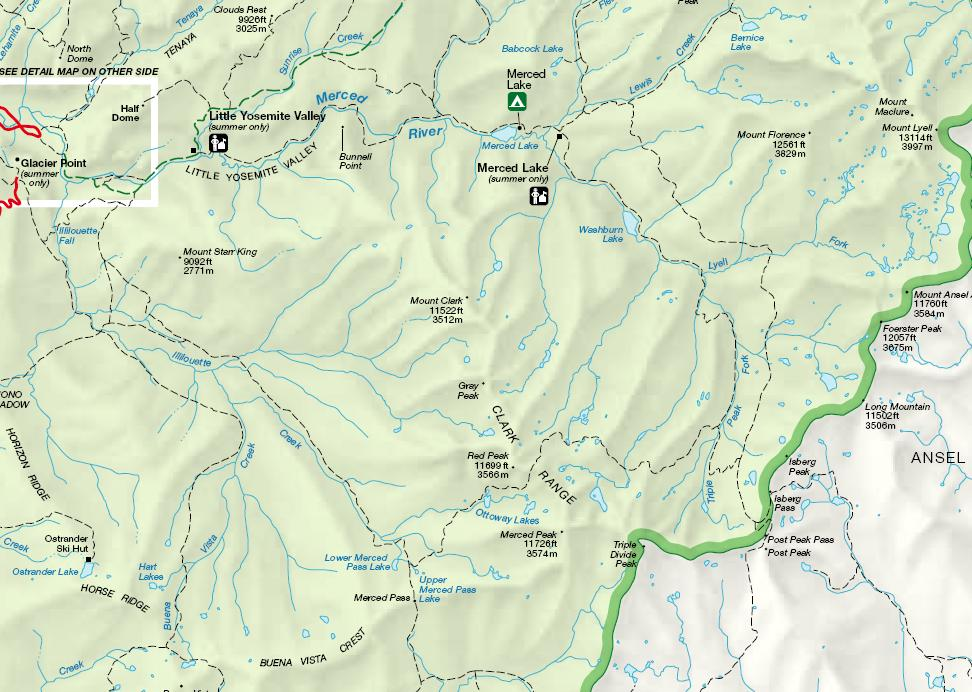
- Country: United States
- State: California
- Range coordinates: 37°40.5′N 119°24′W
- Parent range: Sierra Nevada

Geology
- Rock types: Metamorphic; Igneous

The Clark Range is a subrange of California's Sierra Nevada in Yosemite National Park. Initially, the range was known as the "Merced Group" in early writings of Yosemite from Josiah Whitney and John Muir.

== Geography ==
The range extends in a north–south direction from Quartzite Peak (37°43.0′N 119°25.5′W) to Triple Divide Peak (37°38.0′N 119°22.2′W) and separates the drainage basins of the Illilouette Creek from the uppermost portions of the Merced River. The range is named after Mount Clark, which was named after Galen Clark.

The highest peak in the range is Merced Peak at 11,726 feet (3,574 m). Second-highest is Red Peak, 11,699 feet (3,566 m).

== Geology ==
Metamorphic rock composes most of the Clark Range, with the granite of Mount Clark's summit being the main exception.

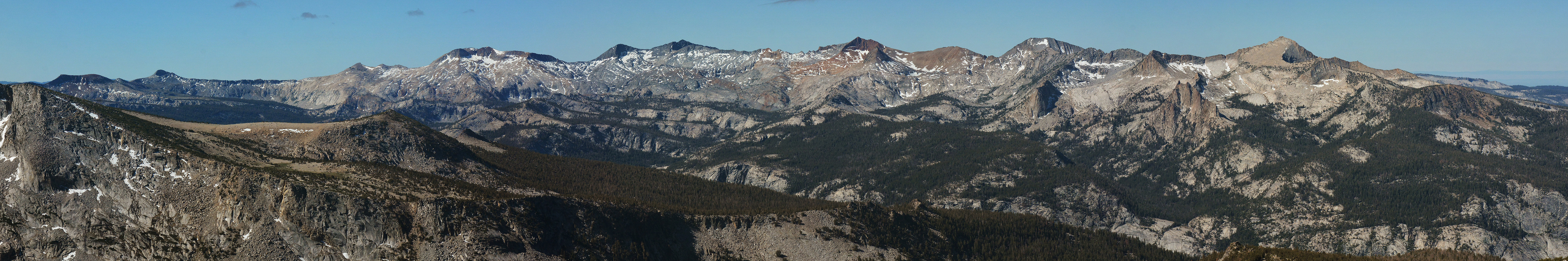
A panoramic view of nearly the entire Clark Range, as shot from the summit of Vogelsang Peak just after 9 am in late June
