= Gray Peak (California) =

Mountain in California, United States

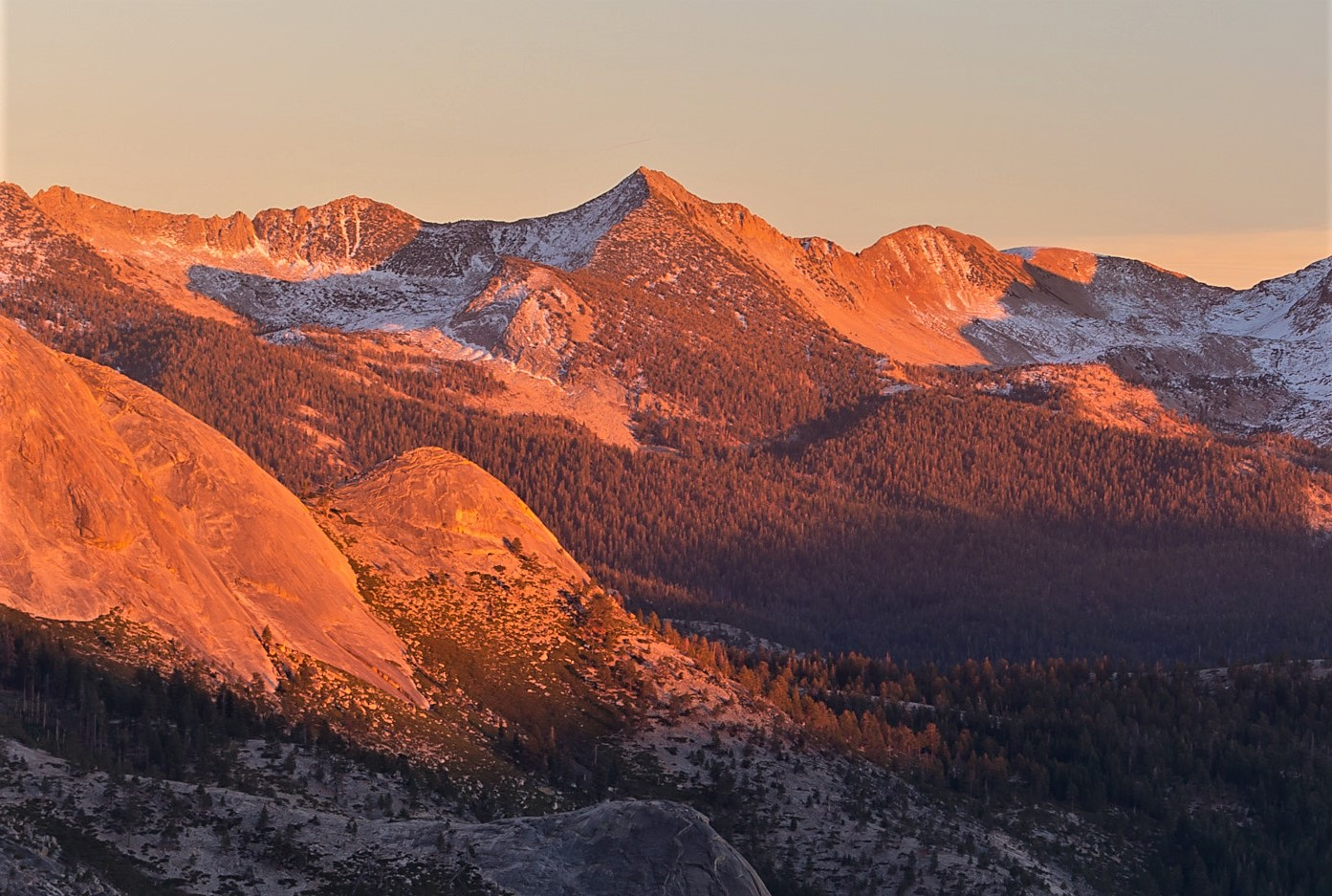
- At sunset, from WNW

Highest point
- Elevation: 11,573 ft (3,527 m)
- Prominence: 573 ft (175 m)
- Parent peak: Red Peak (11,699 ft)
- Isolation: 1.46 mi (2.35 km)
- Listing: Sierra Peaks Section
- Coordinates: 37°40′25″N 119°25′07″W

Geography
- Location within California Location within the United States
- Location: Yosemite National Park; Madera County; California, U.S.
- Parent range: Sierra Nevada; Clark Range
- Topo map: USGS Merced Peak

Geology
- Rock age: Cretaceous
- Mountain type: Fault block
- Rock type: Metamorphic rock

Climbing
- Easiest route: class 2 Southwest slope

Gray Peak is an 11,573-foot-elevation (3,527-meter) mountain summit located in the Sierra Nevada mountain range, in Madera County of northern California, United States. It is situated in Yosemite National Park, approximately 9 miles (14 km) southeast of Yosemite Valley, 1.3 miles (2.1 km) north of Red Peak, and 1.5 miles (2.4 km) south-southeast of Mount Clark. Gray Peak is the fourth-highest peak in the Clark Range, which is a subset of the Sierra Nevada.

== History ==
The peak was probably named by the Wheeler Survey when it explored the Yosemite region in 1878 and 1879. This geographical feature's descriptive name, due to black iron-bearing minerals, was shown on an 1893 Le Conte map as Gray Peak, and was officially adopted in 1897 by the U.S. Board on Geographic Names. In 1920, Ansel Adams left a Sierra Club cylinder-type register at the summit.

== Climate ==
According to the Köppen climate classification system, Gray Peak is located in an alpine climate zone. Most weather fronts originate in the Pacific Ocean, and travel east toward the Sierra Nevada mountains. As fronts approach, they are forced upward by the peaks, causing them to drop their moisture in the form of rain or snowfall onto the range (orographic lift). Precipitation runoff from this mountain drains into tributaries of the Merced River.

== See also ==
- Geology of the Yosemite area

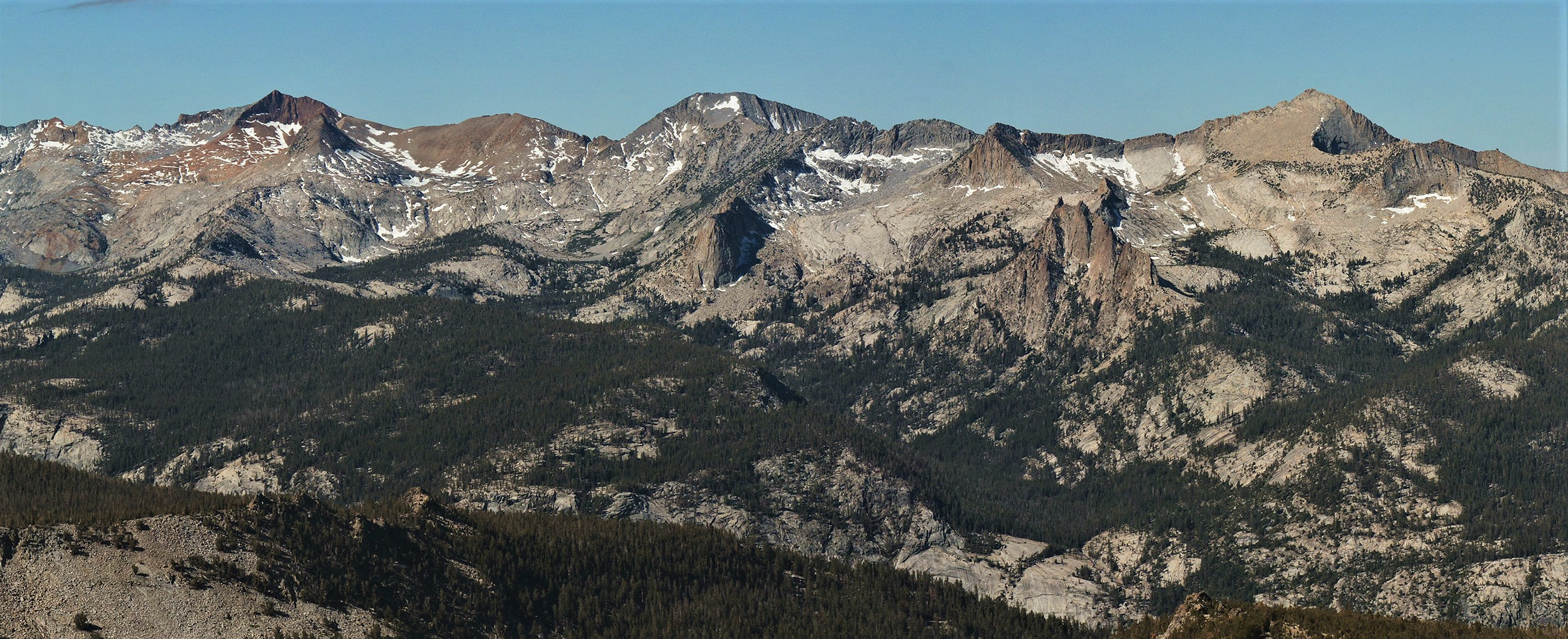
Gray Peak centered, Red Peak to left, Mount Clark to right. From northeast.
