= North Fork Merced River =

- Location of North Fork Merced River in California

Location
- Country: United States
- State: California

Physical characteristics
- Source: Sierra Nevada
  - coordinates: 37°47′2″N 119°58′51″W
  - elevation: 4,188 ft (1,277 m)
- Mouth: Merced River
  - coordinates: 37°36′46″N 120°3′32″W
  - elevation: 932 ft (284 m)
- Length: 18 mi (29 km)

The North Fork Merced River is a tributary of the Merced River in Mariposa County, California. The river originates in the foothills of the Sierra Nevada in the Stanislaus National Forest and flows generally south through a canyon to join the Merced River near Bagby.
