= Forebay =

Forebay may refer to:

- Forebay (reservoir), an artificial pool of water ahead of a larger body of water
- Forebay, the distinctive overhangs on Pennsylvania barns
