= Mount Clark (California) =

Mountain in the American state of California

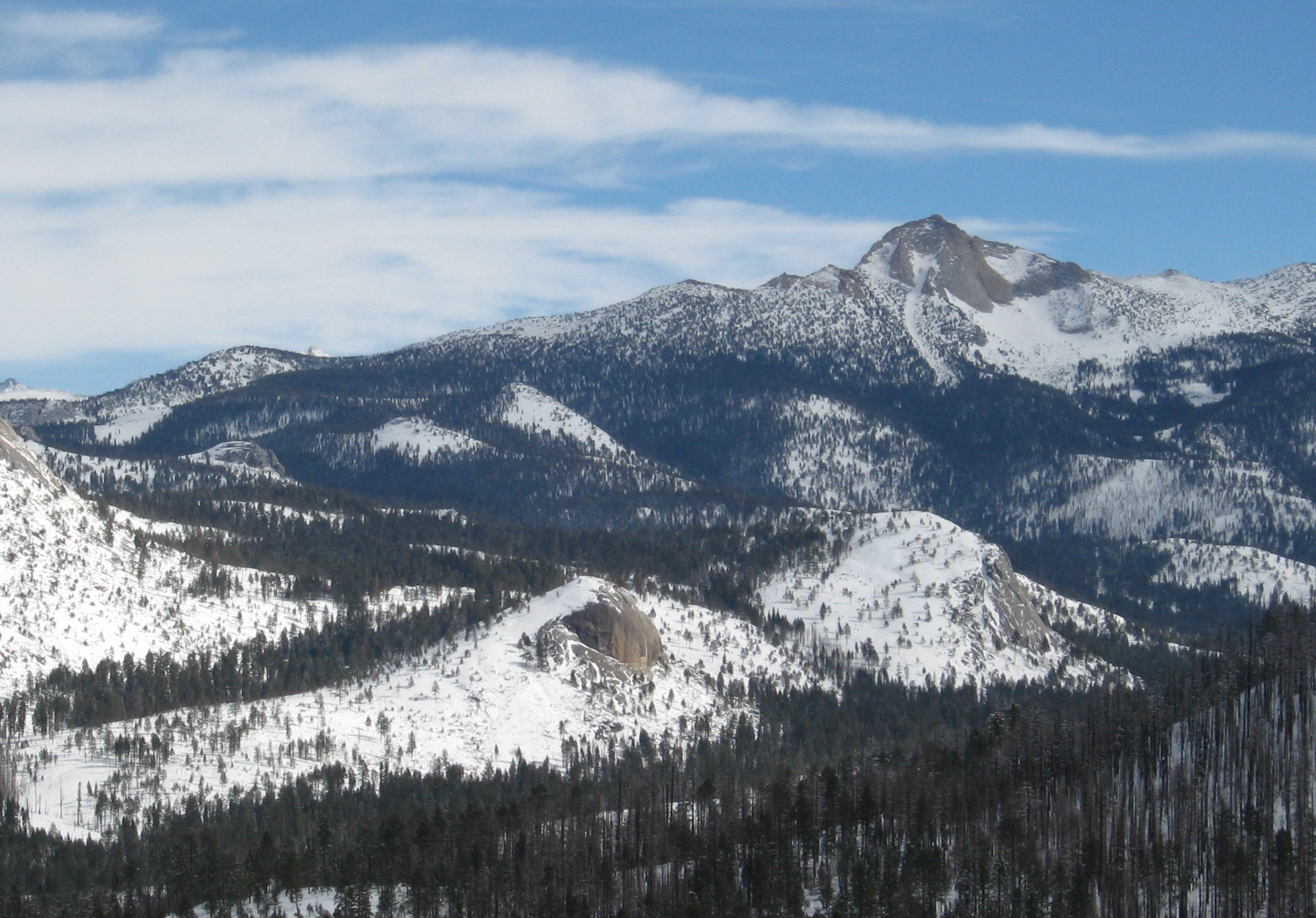
- West face from Glacier Point Road, January 2008.

Highest point
- Elevation: 11,527 ft (3,513 m) NAVD 88
- Prominence: 722 ft (220 m)
- Parent peak: Gray Peak (11,573 ft)
- Listing: SPS Mountaineers peak; Western States Climbers Star peak
- Coordinates: 37°41′47″N 119°25′43″W

Geography
- Location within California Location within the United States
- Location: Yosemite National Park; Mariposa County, California, U.S.
- Parent range: Clark Range, Sierra Nevada
- Topo map: USGS Merced Peak

Climbing
- First ascent: 1866 by Clarence King and James T. Gardiner
- Easiest route: Rock climb, class 4

Mount Clark is a 11,527-foot (3,513 m) granite peak in the Clark Range, a sub-range of the Sierra Nevada. It is a popular destination for mountaineers.

Both the mountain and the range are named in honor of Galen Clark, an early explorer and the first guardian of Yosemite National Park. It was summited in 1866 by Clarence King and James Gardener of the US Geological Survey. Before it received its present name, it was known as Gothic Peak and then The Obelisk, the name used by the Whitney Survey. Obelisk Lake, at 9,853 feet (3,003 m) lies on the mountain's northeast flank.

== Climate ==
Mount Clark is located in an alpine climate zone. Most weather fronts originate in the Pacific Ocean, and travel east toward the Sierra Nevada mountains. As fronts approach, they are forced upward by the peaks (orographic lift), causing them to drop their moisture in the form of rain or snowfall onto the range.

== Gallery ==
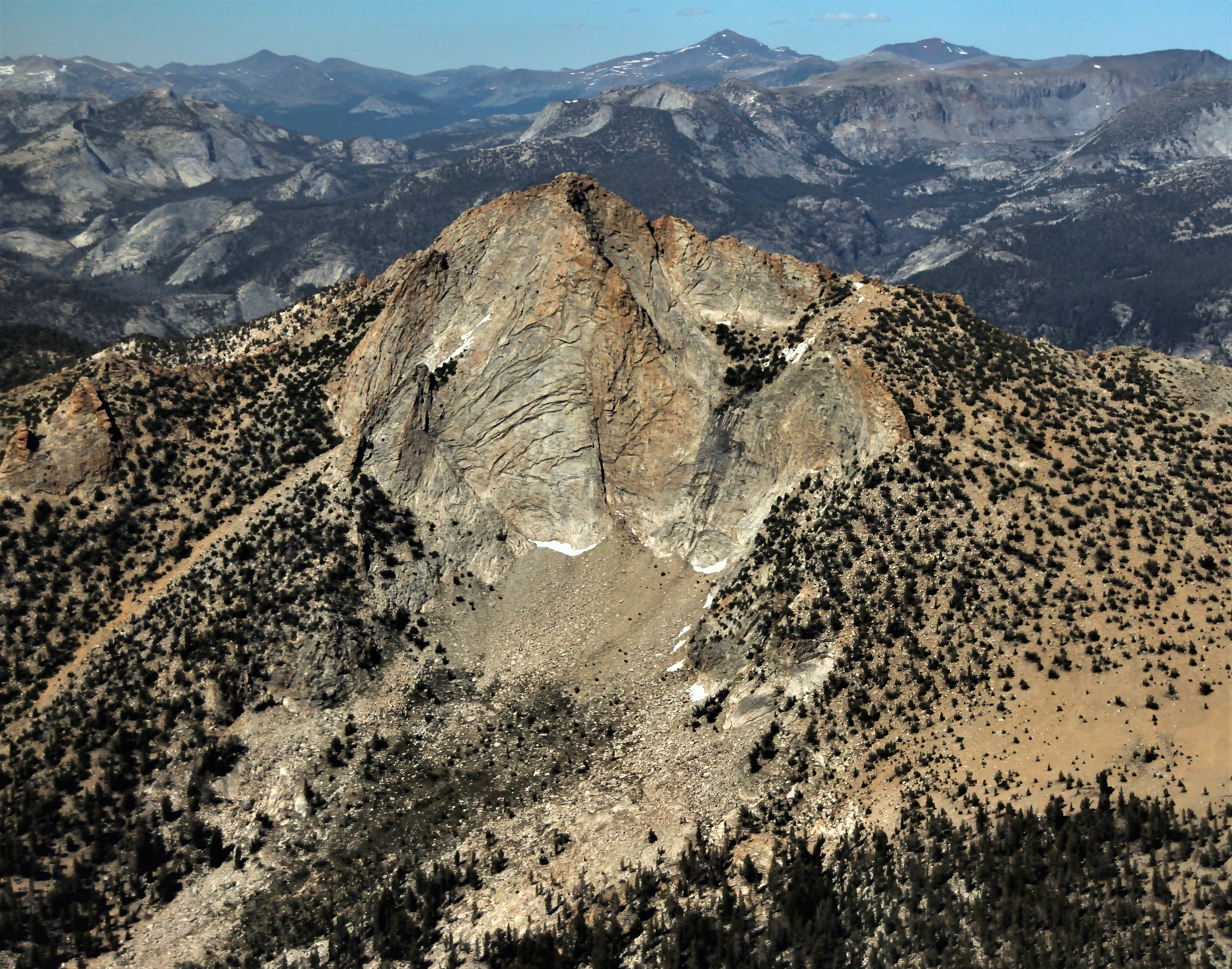
Aerial view from the southwest

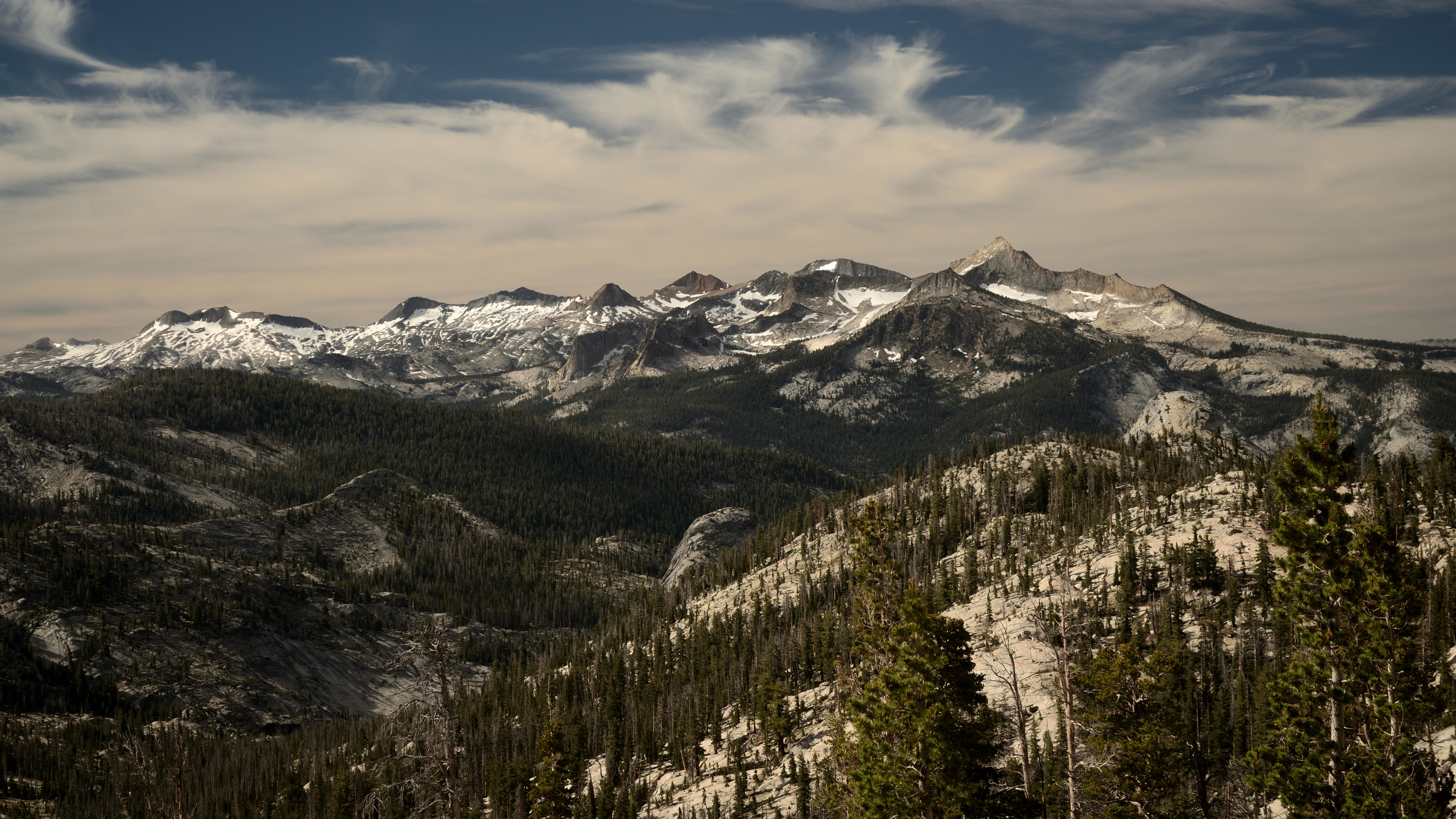
Clark Range, Mt. Clark to right (north aspect)

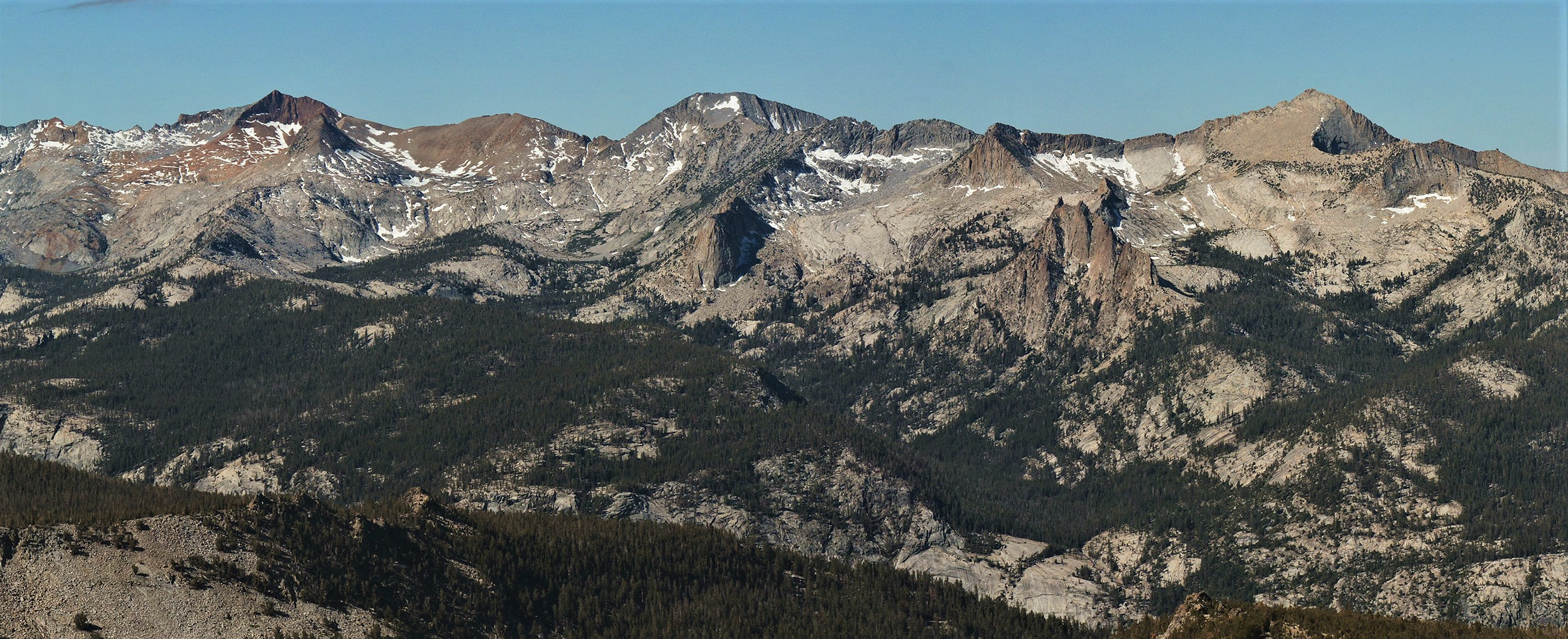
Red Peak (left), Gray Peak, Mt. Clark (right)

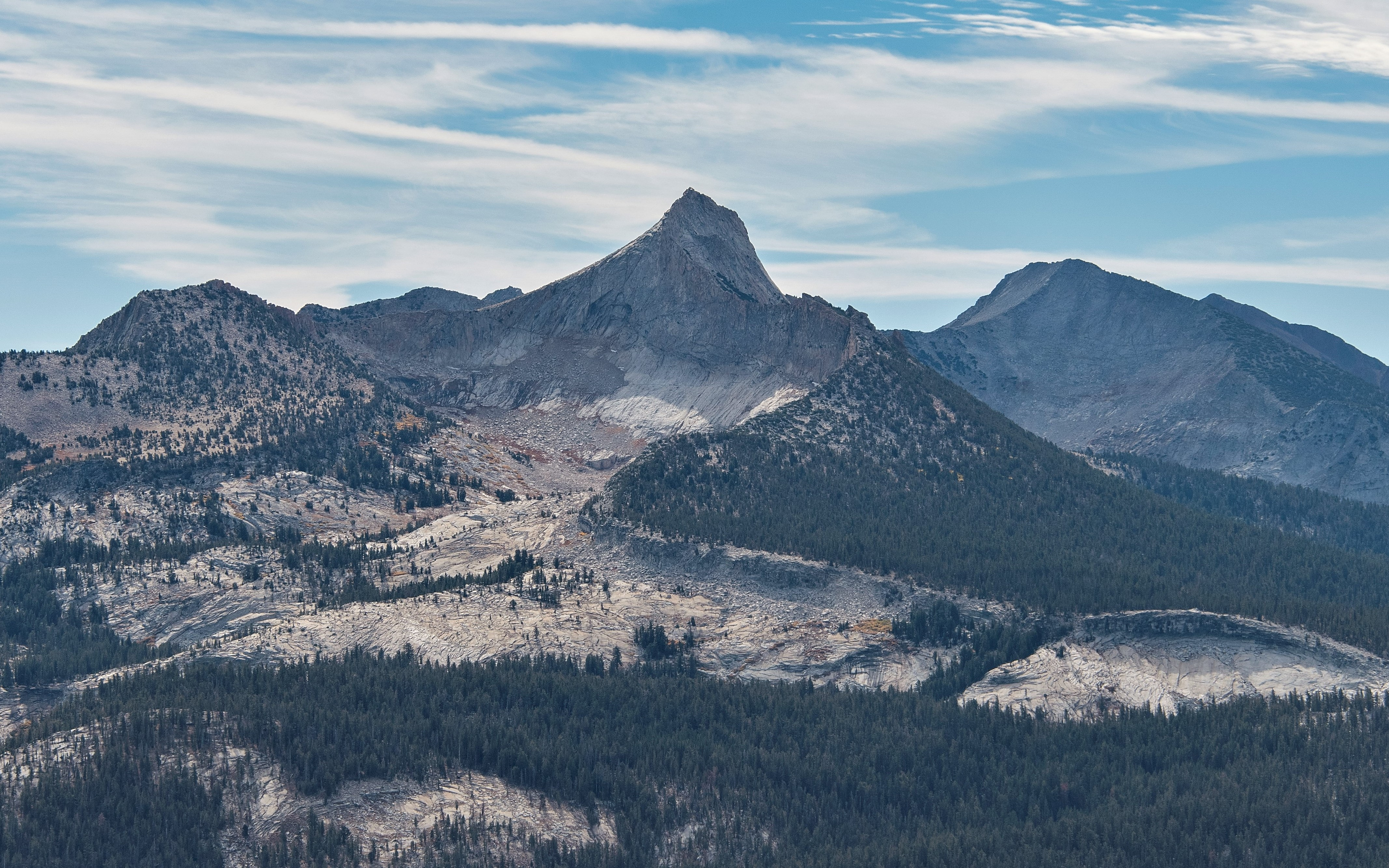
North aspect of Mount Clark seen from Clouds Rest. Gray Peak to right.

== See also ==
- Geology of the Yosemite area
