= Triple Divide Peak (Madera County, California) =

Mountain in Madera County, California, United States

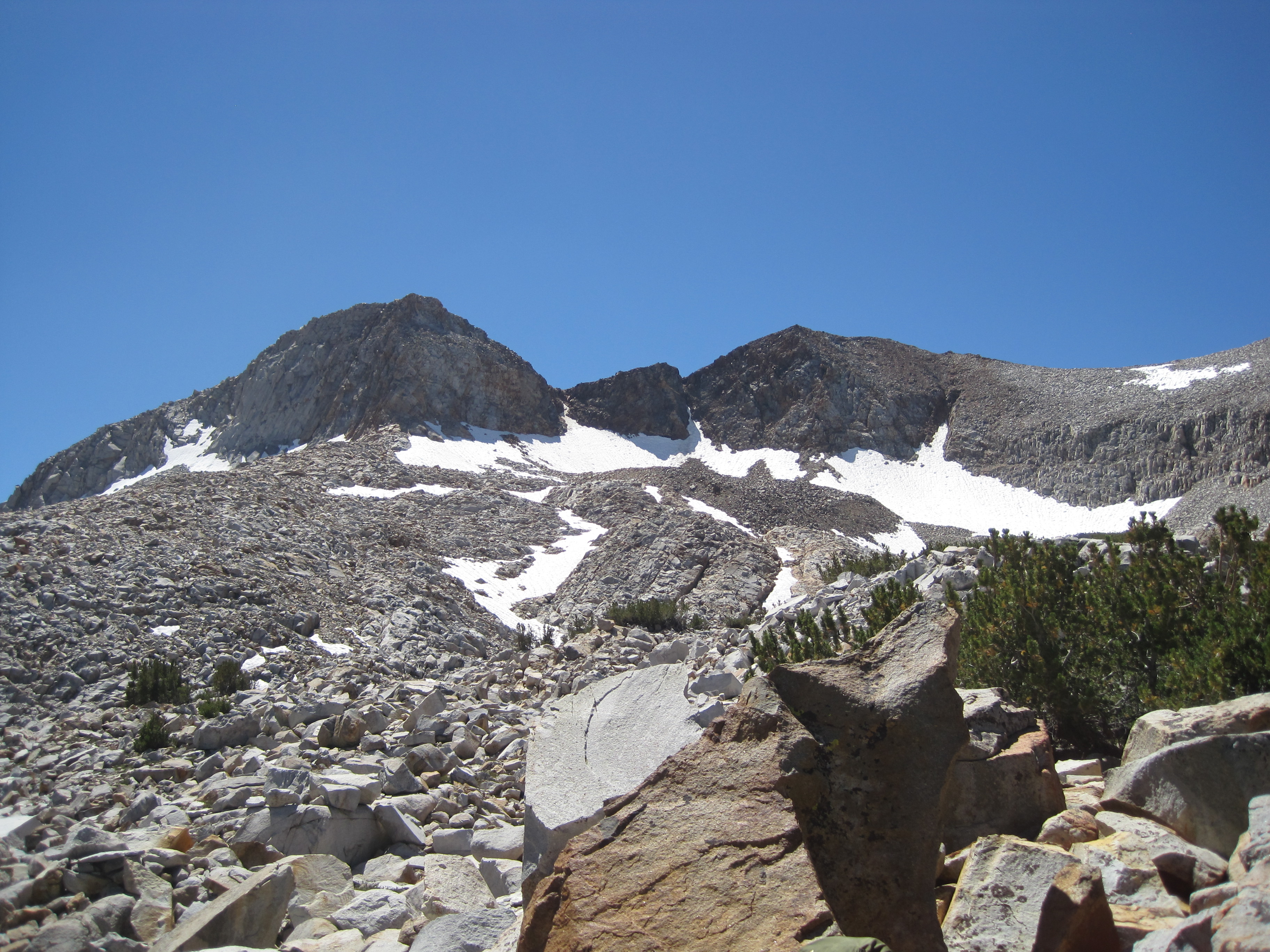
- Triple Divide Peak from the north

Highest point
- Elevation: 11,616 ft (3,541 m) NAVD 88
- Prominence: 651 ft (198 m)
- Coordinates: 37°37′55″N 119°22′14″W

Geography
- Location within California Location within the United States
- Location: Madera County, California U.S.
- Parent range: Sierra Nevada
- Topo map: USGS Mount Lyell

Climbing
- First ascent: 1920 by Norman Clyde
- Easiest route: Scramble, class 3

Triple Divide Peak is a mountain on the boundary between Yosemite National Park and the Ansel Adams Wilderness in Madera County, California. It is located 0.7 miles (1.1 km) north of Walton Lake and 1.3 miles (2.1 km) southeast of Merced Peak. Its name refers to the fact that it lies on the boundaries of three distinct watersheds, namely those of the Merced, South Fork Merced, and San Joaquin rivers.

== Climate ==
According to the Köppen climate classification system, Triple Divide Peak is located in an alpine climate zone. Most weather fronts originate in the Pacific Ocean and travel east toward the Sierra Nevada mountains. As fronts approach, they are forced upward by the peaks (orographic lift), causing moisture in the form of rain or snowfall to drop onto the range.

== See also ==
- Geology of the Yosemite area

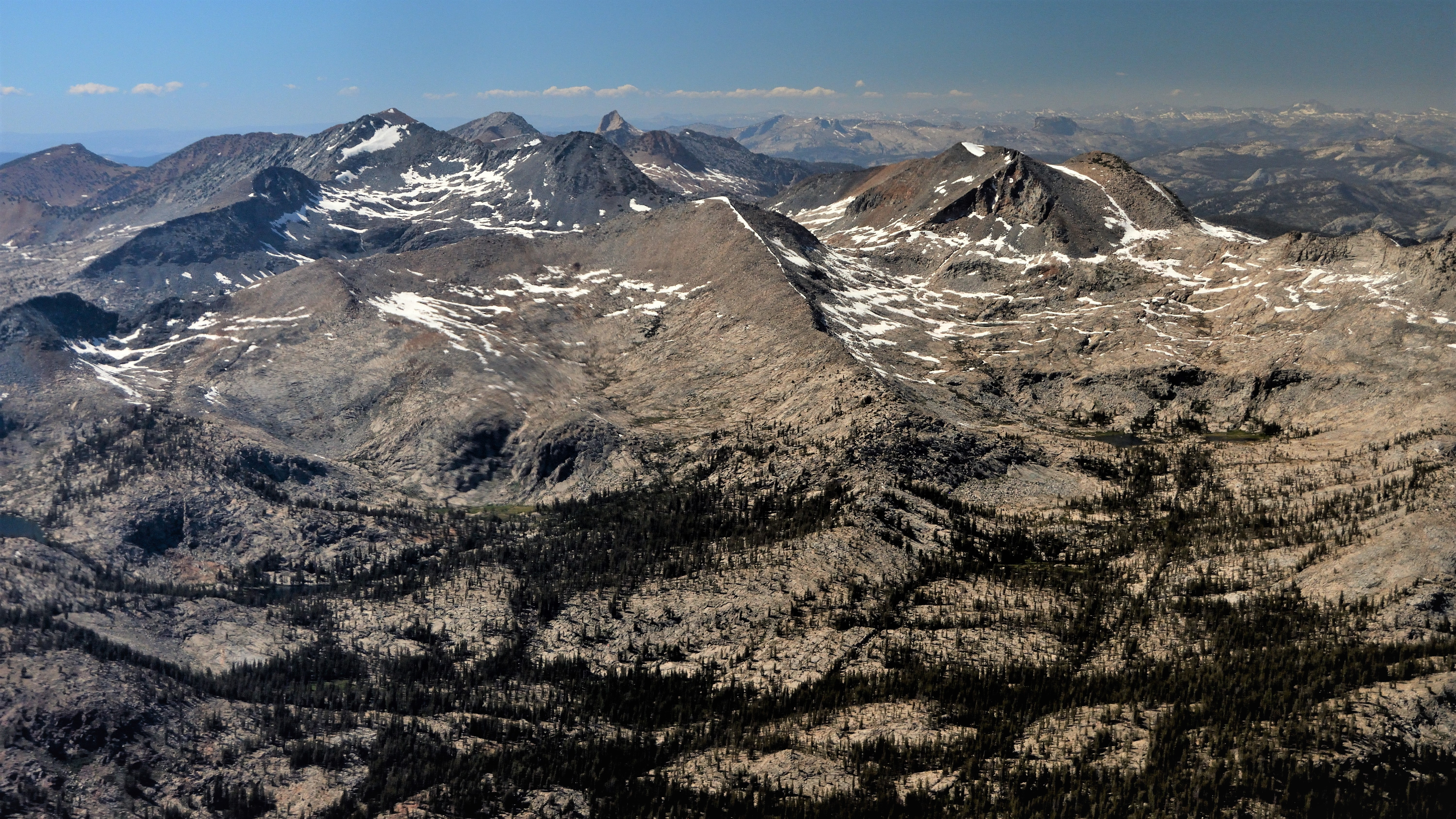
Aerial view of Clark Range and Triple Divide Peak (right)
