= South Fork Merced River =

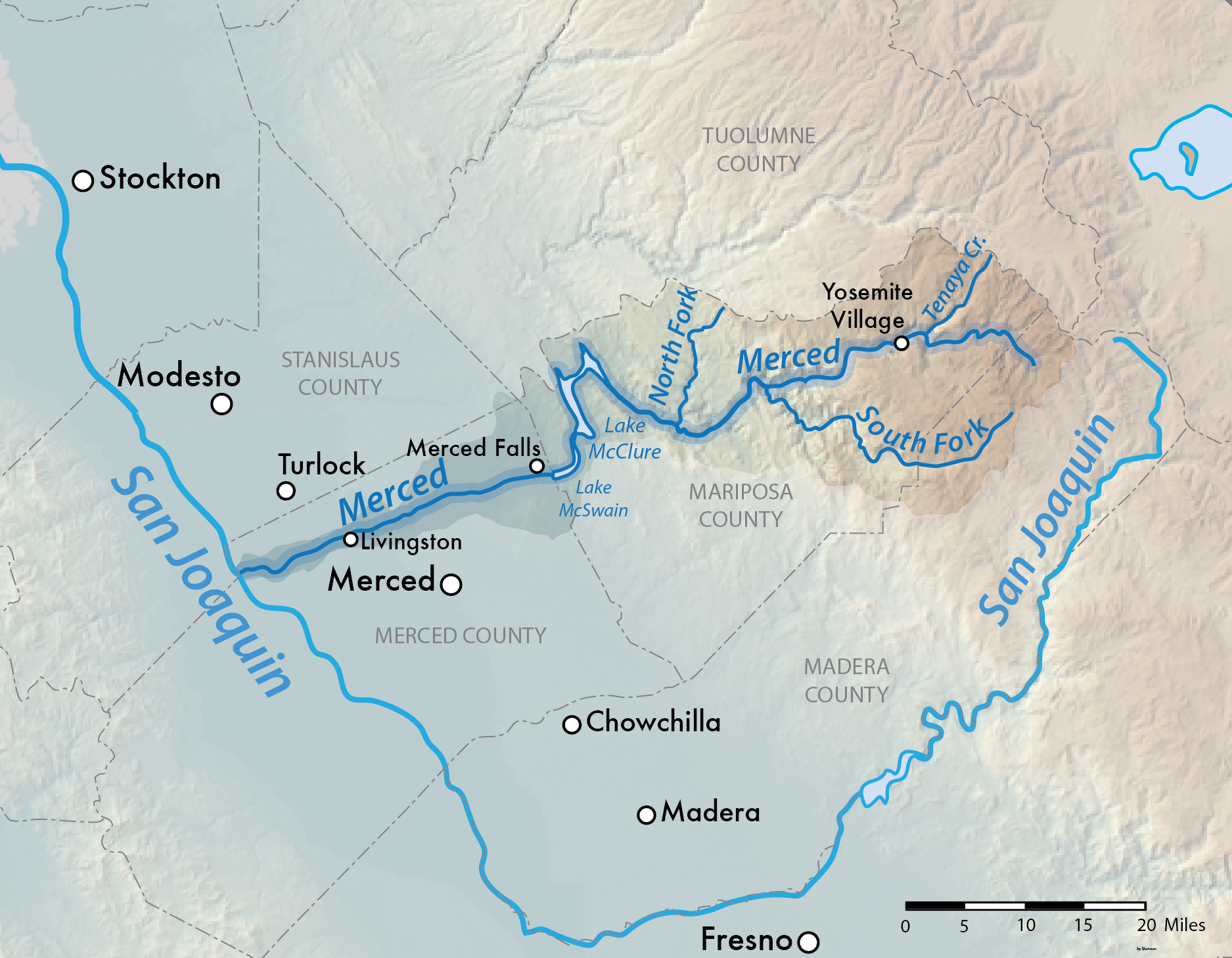
- Merced River drainage basin

National Wild and Scenic River
- Designated: November 2, 1987

The South Fork Merced River is the largest tributary of the Merced River. Most of the river flows within Yosemite National Park in the Sierra Nevada of California. The river is 43 miles (69 km) long, and its drainage basin covers about 240 square miles (620 km^{2}), of which 109 square miles (280 km^{2}) are in the national park. The average flow at the mouth is 356 cubic feet per second (10.1 m^{3}/s).

Originating at about 10,600 feet (3,200 m) on the south flank of Triple Divide Peak, the South Fork Merced River drains the southwestern slopes of Triple Divide Peak and the west facing slopes of Gale Peak and Sing Peak, then runs southwest through a pine forest flanked by granite cliffs until the valley walls close in to become a deep canyon as the river turns west. This canyon comes to an end at a large bowl-shaped valley where the river passes the north side of Wawona and receives Chilnualna Creek from the right. After passing under Wawona Road (the south entrance road to the national park) the river drops into another broader, deeper gorge running north, receiving Alder, Rail, Big, and Bishop Creeks, all from the right. Soon the river turns west, crossing the boundary of Yosemite National Park and the Sierra National Forest and entering the foothills of the Sierra Nevada, and merges with the Merced River some 25 miles (40 km) downstream of the end of Yosemite Valley.

The river was mislabelled "Illilouette Creek" on 1871 California Geological Survey reports. Illilouette Creek is actually another tributary of the Merced River further to the east.
