= Merced River =

River in central California, United States

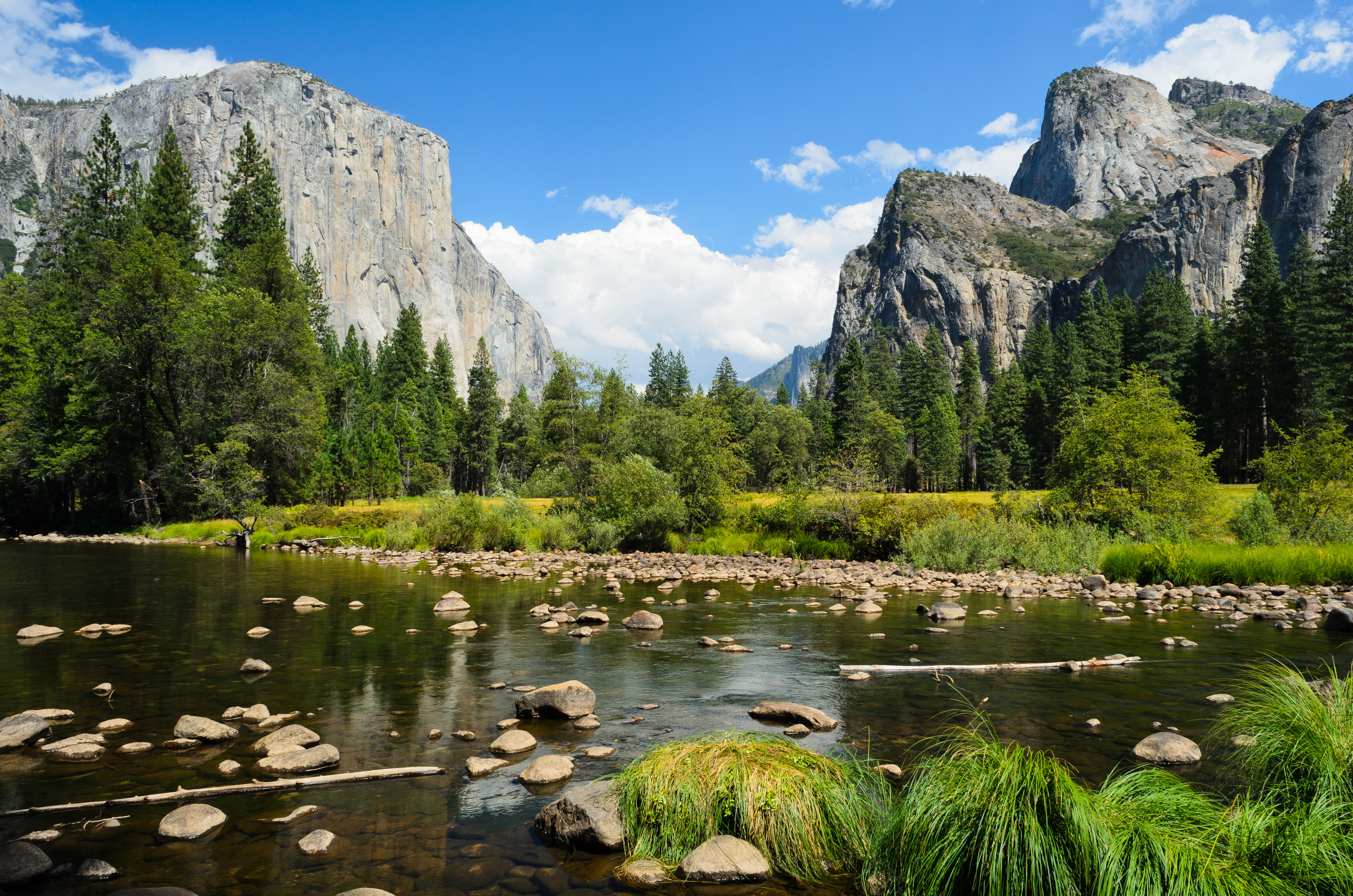
- The Merced River in Yosemite Valley

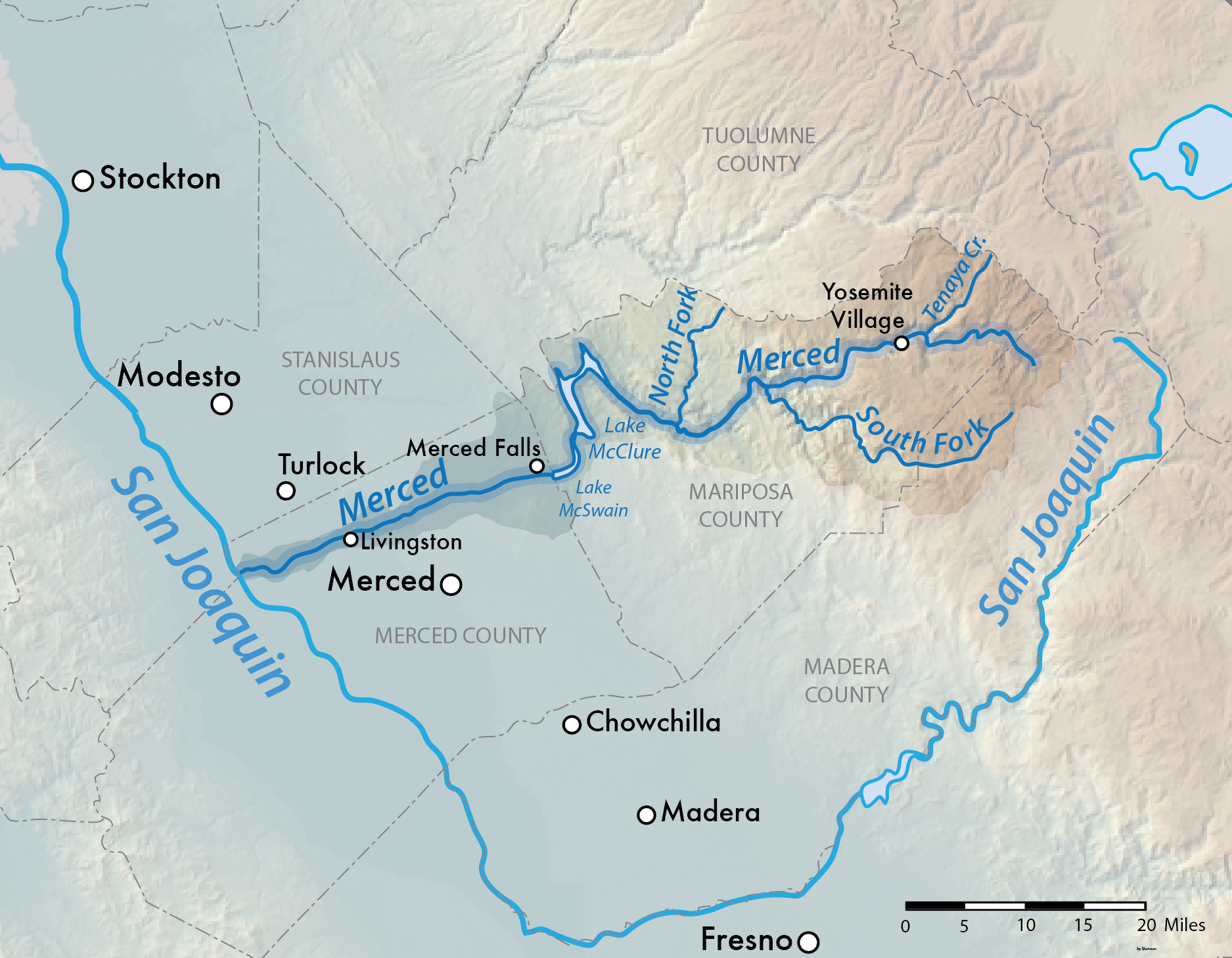
- Map of the Merced River
- Etymology: Spanish El Río de Nuestra Señora de la Merced ("River of Our Lady of Mercy"), given by explorer Gabriel Moraga

Location
- Country: United States
- State: California
- Region: Yosemite National Park, Central Valley (California)
- Cities: El Portal, Livingston

Physical characteristics
- Source: Confluence of Merced Peak and Triple Peak Forks
  - location: Yosemite National Park, Madera County
  - coordinates: 37°41′47.05″N 119°20′53.54″W
  - elevation: 8,017 ft (2,444 m)
- Mouth: San Joaquin River
  - location: Hills Ferry, Stanislaus County
  - coordinates: 37°20′57″N 120°58′32″W
  - elevation: 56 ft (17 m)
- Length: 145 mi (233 km)
- Basin size: 1,726 sq mi (4,470 km^{2})
- Discharge
  - location: Bagby, near Lake McClure
  - average: 1,185 cu ft/s (33.6 m^{3}/s)
  - minimum: 19 cu ft/s (0.54 m^{3}/s)
  - maximum: 92,500 cu ft/s (2,620 m^{3}/s)

Basin features
- Tributaries
  - left: Red Peak Fork, Illilouette Creek, Bridalveil Creek, South Fork Merced River
  - right: Triple Peak Fork, Lyell Fork, Sunrise Creek, Tenaya Creek, Yosemite Creek, Cascade Creek, North Fork Merced River, Dry Creek

National Wild and Scenic River
- Type: Wild, Scenic, Recreational
- Designated: November 2, 1987

The Merced River (/mɜːrˈsɛd/; Spanish: Río Merced, meaning "Mercy River") is a 145-mile (233 km)-long tributary of the San Joaquin River in central California, United States. It flows from the Sierra Nevada into the San Joaquin Valley and is best known for its steep course through the southern part of Yosemite National Park, where it is the primary watercourse in Yosemite Valley. Below the mountains, the river's character changes as it becomes a slow meandering stream across the agricultural San Joaquin Valley.

The river began to take shape as the Sierra Nevada rose about 10 million years ago, and sediment eroded from its canyon helped form the flat floor of the San Joaquin Valley. Glaciation during the ice ages carved the high-elevation portions of the watershed, including Yosemite Valley, into their present form. Historically, an extensive riparian zone provided habitat for millions of migrating birds, and the river supported one of the southernmost runs of chinook salmon in North America.

Miwok and Paiute people lived along the river for thousands of years before Spanish and Mexican military expeditions passed through in the early 19th century. The California Gold Rush brought settlers to towns along the lower Merced River. The Yosemite Valley Railroad was built along the Merced River canyon, enabling mining and logging in the upper watershed and later carrying tourists to Yosemite National Park. Conflicts between settlers and Native Americans led to the expulsion of the Ahwahnechee from Yosemite.

Large-scale irrigation was introduced to the San Joaquin Valley in the late 19th century, leading to construction of numerous dams that blocked migrating salmon and caused steep declines in riparian habitat. Diversion of water for irrigation often reduces the river to a small stream by the time it reaches its mouth. Mitigation efforts include habitat conservation work, re-establishment of historic streamflow patterns, and operation of a salmon hatchery.

== Course and watershed ==
The Merced River is one of 15 major river systems in the Sierra Nevada. Originating in Yosemite’s alpine peaks, the Merced River flows west for 145 miles (233 km) to its confluence with the San Joaquin River outside the park in the Central Valley, encompassing a drainage basin of 1,700 square miles (4,400 km^{2}). The first 122 miles (196 km) of the Merced River are designated as Wild and Scenic.

The headwaters of the Merced River originate in Yosemite in several watersheds: the Lyell Fork, Triple Peak Fork, Merced Peak Fork, and Red Peak Fork. These watersheds are at the far eastern side of the Merced River watershed. The Tuolumne, Mono, and San Joaquin River watersheds are to the north, east, and south, respectively.

The headwaters of the Merced River lie at 8,017 feet (2,444 m) at the foot of the Clark Range, a subrange of the Sierra Nevada. The river rises at the confluence of the Triple Peak Fork and Merced Peak Fork after they cascade down glacially polished slopes from the high country in the eastern part of Yosemite National Park. From its headwaters, the main stem of the Merced River flows freely through a wilderness landscape of alpine peaks, glacially carved valleys, and high-elevation meadows.

The river makes a dramatic entry into Yosemite Valley, rushing over towering cliffs in prominent waterfalls. The Merced drops over Nevada Fall and Vernal Fall, together known as the "Giant Staircase", then receives Illilouette Creek and flows into Yosemite Valley, where it meanders between pine forests and meadows on the valley floor.

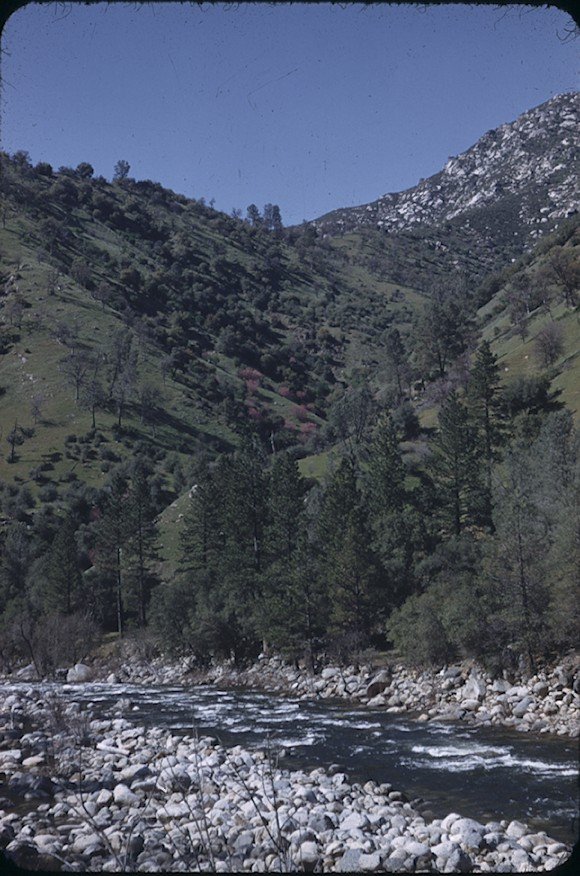
The Merced River canyon in Yosemite National Park

At the west end of Yosemite Valley, the canyon narrows and the river becomes a cascade of continuous rapids through the Merced Gorge. The gradient changes abruptly at the park boundary, where the river continues through El Portal on its journey through the Sierra Nevada foothills. The river arcs northwest to receive the North Fork, then enters Lake McClure, formed by New Exchequer Dam. Below New Exchequer, the river flows west through a heavily irrigated region of the Central Valley, passing through McSwain and Crocker-Huffman Dams and the cities of Hopeton, Delhi, and Livingston. It joins the San Joaquin River at Hills Ferry, a few miles south of Turlock.

The South Fork Merced River originates at the Sierra crest from the southwestern slopes of Triple Divide Peak and the west-facing slopes of Gale Peak and Sing Peak. The South Fork Merced River flows southwest through Yosemite Wilderness (south of the Clark Range) and the community of Wawona. The South Fork Merced River exits the park less than a mile below the Wawona Campground and then flows through the Sierra National Forest to the confluence with the main stem of the Merced River, west of El Portal.

== Hydrology ==
Much of the Merced River basin is at high elevation, where an alpine climate prevails. The Sierra receives heavy snowfall in winter, which melts in spring and early summer, causing annual flooding. By late autumn, the river level has dropped considerably, and some smaller tributaries dry up altogether. Up to 85 percent of the flow above Happy Isles comes from snowmelt. In the dry season, groundwater provides the only base flow. The river is also fed by dozens of high Sierra lakes, the largest of which include Merced Lake, Tenaya Lake, Ostrander Lake, the Chain Lakes, and May Lake. The foothills experience a drier Mediterranean climate, while the San Joaquin Valley floor is dry enough to be classified as semi-arid.

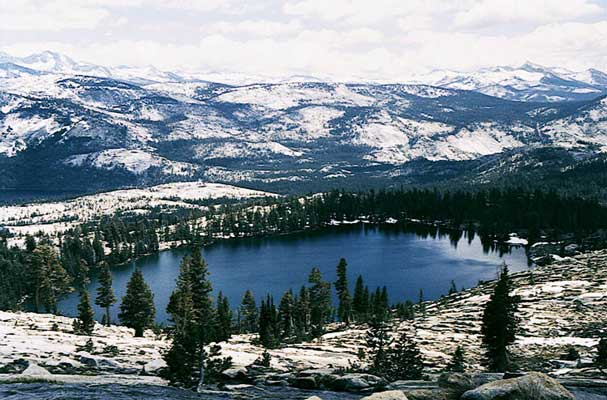
May Lake, at the headwaters of Snow Creek, is one of many lakes feeding the Merced River.

The Merced River is the third-largest tributary of the San Joaquin River. Before irrigation began in the Central Valley and dams were built, the river's natural flow at the mouth was much higher than the current average of 661 cubic feet per second (18.7 m^{3}/s), or about 479,000 acre-feet (591,000,000 m^{3}) per year. Upstream at Happy Isles, the average flow is 355 cubic feet per second (10.1 m^{3}/s). The United States Geological Survey (USGS) maintains stream gauges at three locations along the Merced River: at Happy Isles, above Lake McClure, and at the mouth. The first two record flows unaffected by dams, but discharge at the mouth is controlled primarily by New Exchequer Dam. The Lake McClure gauge, at the former mining town of Bagby, is probably the most representative for overall flows. The average annual flow recorded there was 1,185 cubic feet per second (33.6 m^{3}/s) from 1923 to 1966. A peak of 92,500 cubic feet per second (2,620 m^{3}/s) was recorded there on December 23, 1955. At the mouth gauge, the highest flow was only 13,600 cubic feet per second (390 m^{3}/s) in 1950. At Happy Isles, the largest flow ever recorded was 10,100 cubic feet per second (290 m^{3}/s) during the 1997 Yosemite floods, which destroyed campgrounds, roads, paths, and bridges throughout the valley.

== Ecology ==
According to a 2006 study, there were 37 fish species, 127 bird species, and 140 insect and invertebrate species in the Merced River watershed. Differences in climate produce a large disparity between species found in the upper watershed (above Lake McClure) and along the lower river.

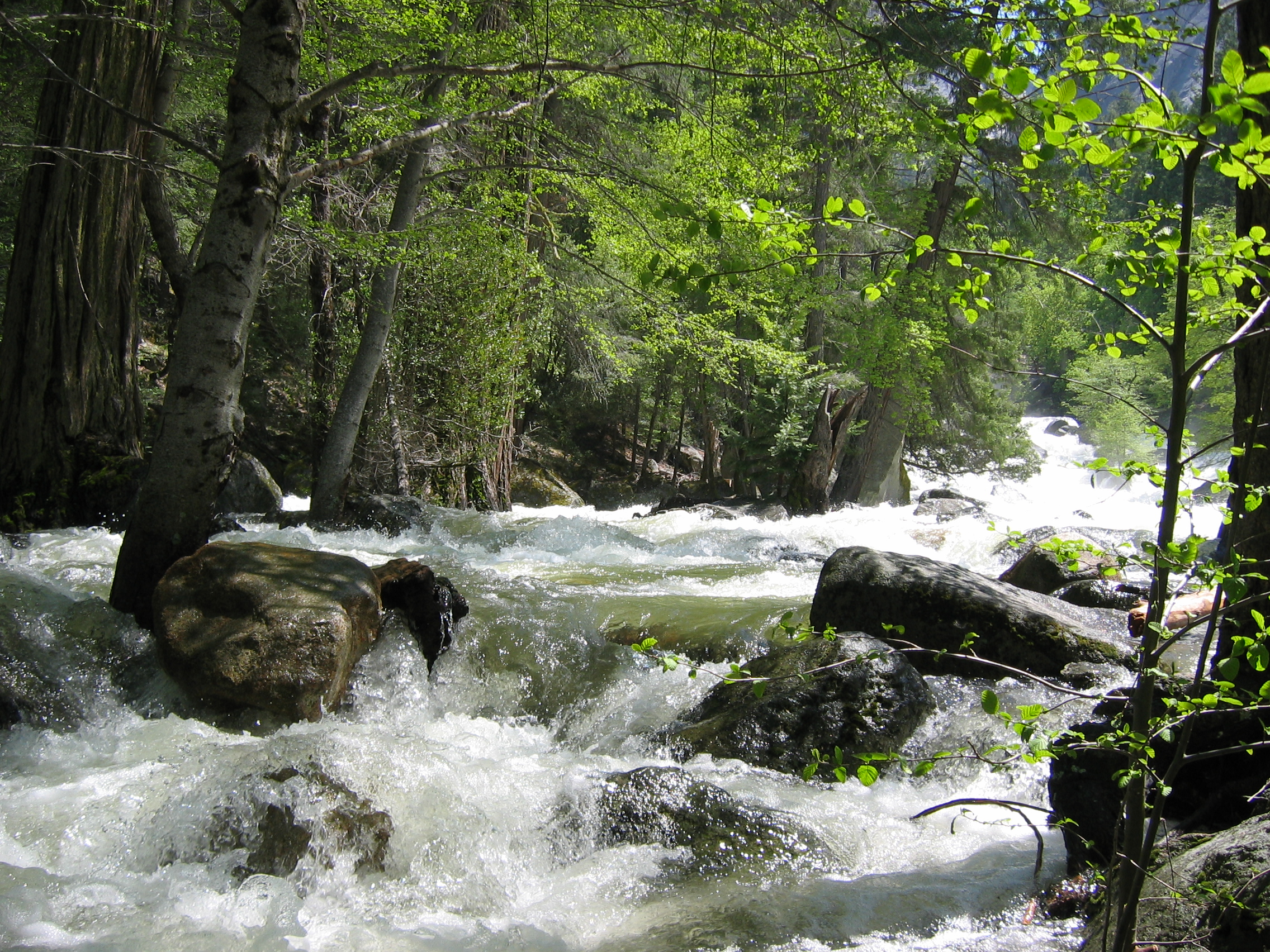
Salmon historically migrated as far upstream as Happy Isles, but dams now block their passage.

The lower Central Valley portion of the river supports 26 species of native and introduced fish, including Sacramento sucker, smallmouth bass, largemouth bass, and carp. Anadromous species in the lower river include chinook salmon, Pacific lamprey, and striped bass. The upper river, from Lake McClure to the headwaters, has 11 fish species. Historically, anadromous fish ranged as far as the waterfalls at the head of Yosemite Valley, but dams have blocked their migration since the early 1900s, and diversions frequently dewater remaining spawning habitat in the lower river. Environmental measures enacted in the late 20th century had some success in boosting chinook salmon populations, from a record low of 500 fish during several years in the 1950s to a high of 30,000 in 1984. Since the 1970s, the annual chinook run has averaged about 5,300.

Of the 127 bird species found along the Merced River, only 35 occur along its entire length. Many are migratory, passing through the area only a few times per year, while 109 species are found only during the breeding season. Birds are more abundant along the slow-moving lower river, which provides more riparian habitat than the rocky, swift upper reaches. Common species throughout the basin include ruby-crowned kinglet, cedar waxwing, American robin, yellow-rumped warbler, tree swallow, and European starling, along with several endangered species, including white-tailed kite and Swainson's hawk. Birds common in the middle and upper sections include mourning dove, Cassin's finch, California quail, dark-eyed junco, woodpecker, dipper, great blue heron, Western scrub jay, red-winged blackbird, red-tailed hawk, turkey vulture, cliff swallow, canyon wren, merganser, and bald eagle. Common insects along the river include mayflies, stoneflies, and caddisflies. The river is affected by invasive Asiatic clam, Chinese mitten crab, and New Zealand mud snail.

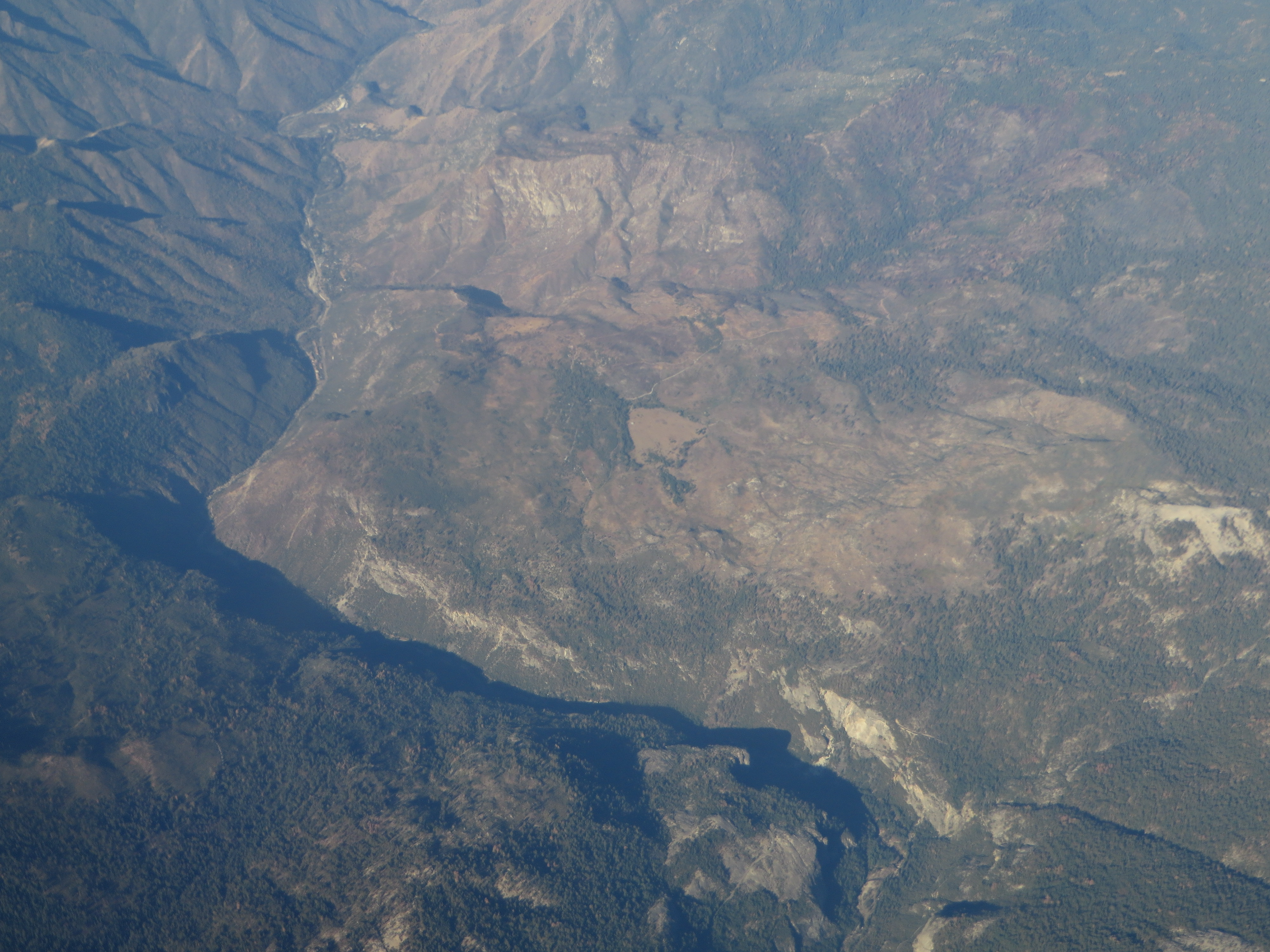
The Merced River near El Portal, downstream of Yosemite

Plant species found throughout the middle and upper basin include California poppy, white alder, Oregon ash, oak, poison oak, bigleaf maple, Indian rhubarb, buttonbush, willow, whiteleaf manzanita, and historically, sugar pine, before heavy logging in the late 19th century. Mammals in the middle and upper watershed include squirrels, raccoons, jackrabbits, bats, skunks, beavers, mule deer, coyote, bobcat, and American black bear.

One species of particular interest is the limestone salamander, an extremely rare amphibian whose only habitat is the Merced Canyon downstream of Yosemite Valley. The salamander depends on the limestone walls of the canyon to survive. To protect the species, a 20-mile (32 km) segment of the canyon covering 1,600 acres (6.5 km^{2}) was designated an "Area of Critical Environmental Concern" in 1986.

== Geology ==
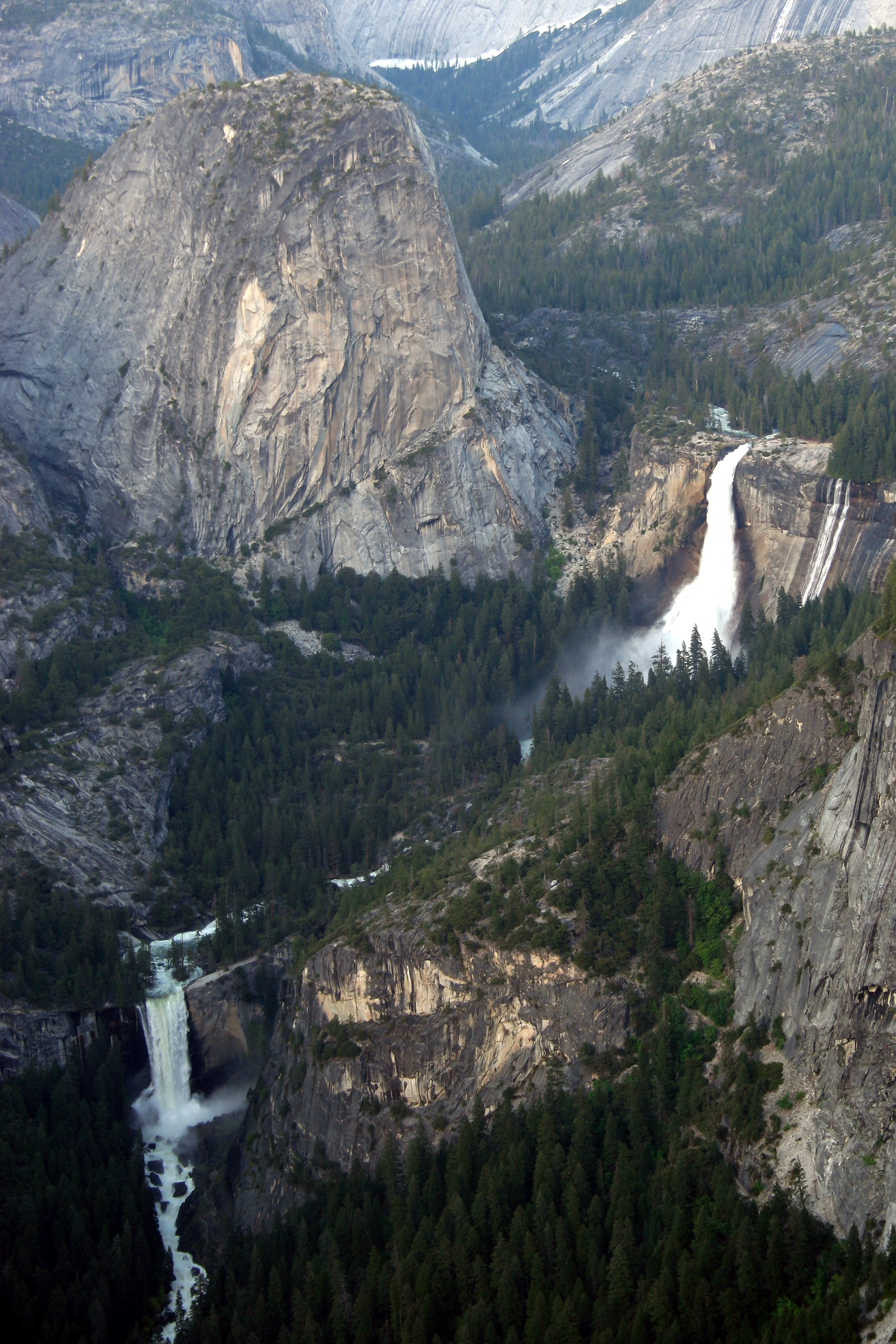
The Giant Staircase between Yosemite and Little Yosemite Valley

When the North American Plate on its westward journey encountered the Pacific Plate approximately 250 million years ago during the Paleozoic, the latter began to subduct under the North American continent. Intense subsurface pressure caused portions of the Pacific Plate to melt, and the resulting upwelling magma pushed up and hardened into the granite batholith that makes up much of the Sierra Nevada. Extensive layers of marine sedimentary rock that originally constituted the ancient Pacific seabed were also pushed up by the rising granite, and the ancestral Merced River formed on this rock layer. Over millions of years, the Merced cut a deep canyon through the softer sedimentary rock, eventually reaching the hard granite beneath. Encountering this resistant layer slowed the river's downcutting, although tributary streams continued to widen the ancient canyon.

Over about 80 million years, erosion transported massive amounts of alluvial sediment to the floor of the Central Valley, where it was trapped between the Coast Ranges on the west and the Sierra Nevada on the east, forming a flat and fertile land surface. The present-day form of the upper Merced River watershed was shaped by glaciers, and the lower watershed was indirectly but significantly affected.

When the last glacial period arrived, a series of four large valley glaciers filled the upper basin of the Merced River. These glaciers rose in branches upstream of Yosemite Valley, descending from the Merced River headwaters, Tenaya Canyon, and Illilouette Creek. Tenaya Canyon was actually eroded even deeper by an arm of the Tuolumne Glacier, which formed the Grand Canyon of the Tuolumne and Hetch Hetchy Valley on the Tuolumne River to the north. Little Yosemite Valley formed where the underlying rock was harder than that below the Giant Staircase, the cliff wall containing Vernal Fall and Nevada Fall. The three branches of each glacier combined to form a single glacier about 7,000 feet (2,100 m) thick at maximum, stretching 25 miles (40 km) downstream past the mouth of Yosemite Valley well into Merced Canyon. These glaciers formed the granite cliffs now known as Half Dome, El Capitan, and Clouds Rest.

The first and largest glacier was the Sherwin (or pre-Tahoe) glacier, which eroded the upper Merced watershed to an extent close to its present form. Three stages followed during the Wisconsinian glaciation: the Tahoe, Tenaya, and Tioga stages, of which the Tioga was the smallest. The Tioga glacier left a rocky moraine at the mouth of Yosemite Valley. This moraine was one of several deposited by the four glaciations, which also include Medial Moraine and Bridalveil Moraine. After the Tioga Glacier retreated, the moraine impounded a lake that flooded nearly the entire valley. Gradual sedimentation filled Lake Yosemite, creating a broad, flat valley floor. Sediments of glacial origin continued to travel down the Merced, contributing to the flat floor of the Central Valley.

== History ==
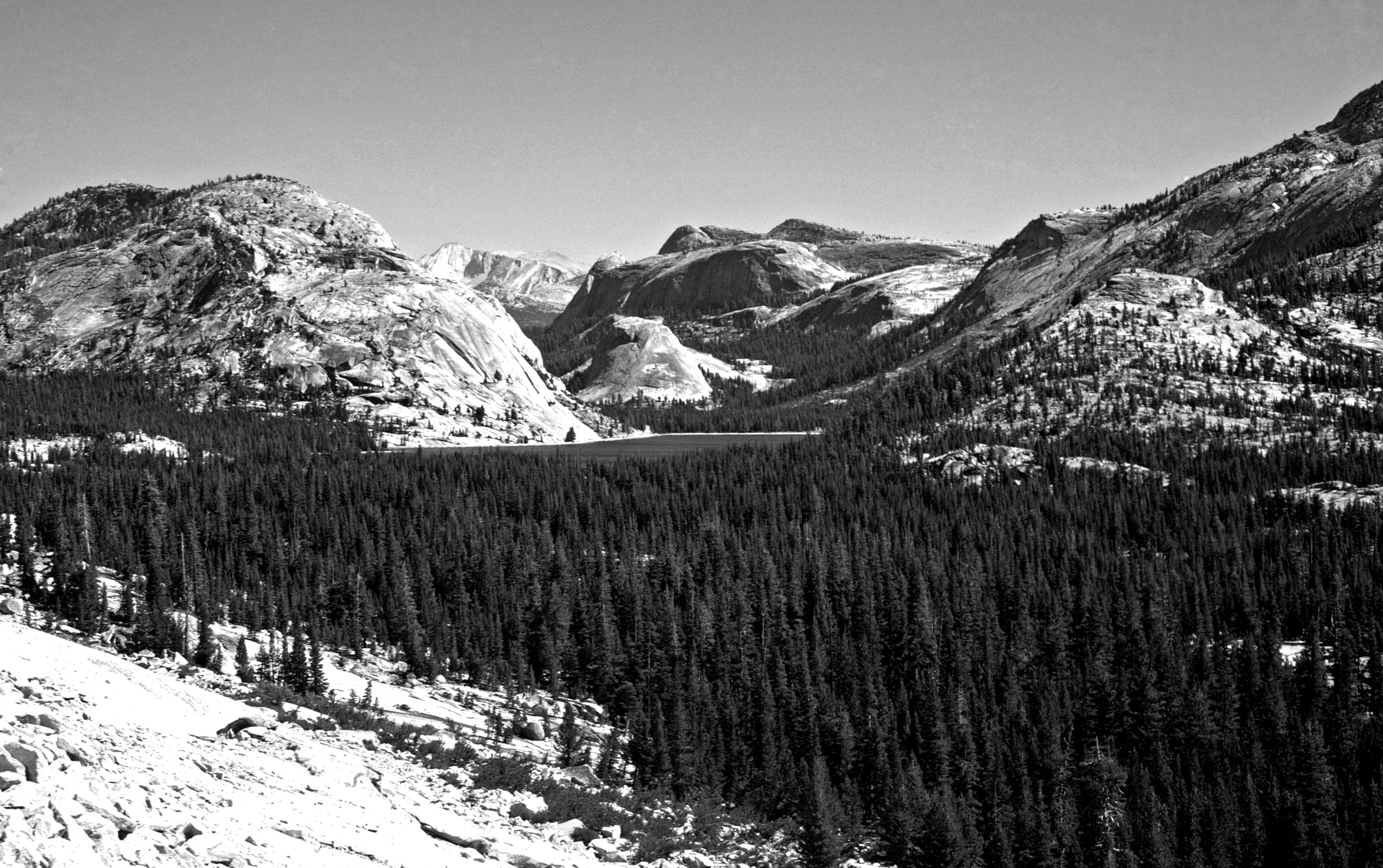
Tenaya Lake was named for Chief Tenaya, leader of the Ahwahnechee.

Of the many Native American peoples who lived on the Merced River, the most prominent were the Miwok (consisting of Plains Miwok and Sierra Miwok), Paiute, and Ahwahnechee. Plains Miwok settled in the lowlands along the lower Merced River. The Sierra (or Mountain) Miwok lived in the upper Merced Canyon and in Yosemite Valley; at the time of first European contact, there were about 450 Sierra Miwok split among ten permanent villages. Paiute people, originally from the eastern Sierra near Mono Lake, also lived in the upper watershed. The Sierra Miwok and Mono Lake Paiute, through cultural interaction over time, formed a distinct group, the Ahwahnechee, whose name derives from Ahwahnee, meaning "the valley shaped like a big mouth" – a reference to the U-shaped Yosemite Valley.

In the early 19th century, several military expeditions sent by Spanish colonists from coastal California traveled into the Central Valley. One, headed by lieutenant Gabriel Moraga, arrived on the south bank of the Merced River on September 29, 1806. They named the river Río de Nuestra Señora de la Merced (River of Our Lady of Mercy); the Virgin of Mercy is the patron saint of the diocese of Barcelona, celebrated on September 24. Another expedition in 1805 similarly named the Kings River upon reaching it on January 6, the feast of the Epiphany. Moraga's expedition was part of a series of exploratory ventures, funded by the Spanish government, to find suitable sites for missions in the Central Valley and the Sierra Nevada foothills. In 1808 and 1810, Moraga led further expeditions along the lower Merced River below Merced Canyon, each time without result. Plans to establish a mission chain in the valley were eventually abandoned. In 1855, Merced County was created, named after the river.

Following the establishment of Merced County and California's independence from Mexico, settlers came to the Merced River area and founded small towns. One of the first was Dover, established in 1844 at the confluence of the Merced with the San Joaquin. Dover functioned as an inland port where boats delivered supplies from the San Francisco Bay area to settlers in the San Joaquin Valley. Other towns followed, including Hopeton, Snelling, and Merced Falls, the last named for a set of rapids on the Merced near the present-day site of McSwain Dam. In the late 1880s, a flour mill, woolen mill, and several lumber mills were built at Merced Falls. The Sugar Pine Lumber Company and Yosemite Lumber Company operated mills there for over thirty years, relying on narrow-gauge railroads to ship lumber from the Sierra Nevada along the Merced River. Following construction of the Central Pacific Railroad and Southern Pacific Railroad, many of the river towns were deserted. Several cities that did achieve prominence include Merced and Turlock, both located on the railroad.

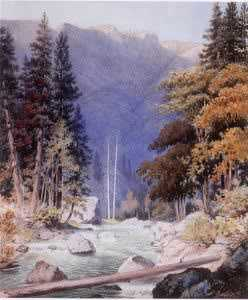
The Merced River, Yosemite, California, by George Henry Burgess

The California Gold Rush in the 1850s brought increasing mining activity to Merced Canyon and Yosemite Valley. Many Native Americans in the area revolted, leading to armed conflict between miners and the Ahwahnechee. In 1851, the Mariposa Battalion was formed to drive the remaining Ahwahnechee out of the valley into reservations. The Battalion fought an Ahwahnechee group led by Chief Tenaya over the South Fork of the Merced River. They succeeded in removing most of the Ahwahnechee from Yosemite Valley, first to a reservation near Fresno. Following the Gold Rush, the Ahwahnechee were allowed to return, but further incidents prompted a second battalion to drive them out again, this time to the Mono Lake area.

Even before the establishment of Yosemite National Park, tourists began traveling into Merced Canyon and Yosemite Valley as early as 1855. The first roads into Yosemite Valley were built in the 1870s. The first was the Coulterville Road, originating at Coulterville, followed by the Big Oak Flat Road, a trading route from Stockton to Merced Canyon. Environmental advocacy led by John Muir and Robert Underwood Johnson convinced the U.S. Congress to establish Yosemite National Park in 1890.

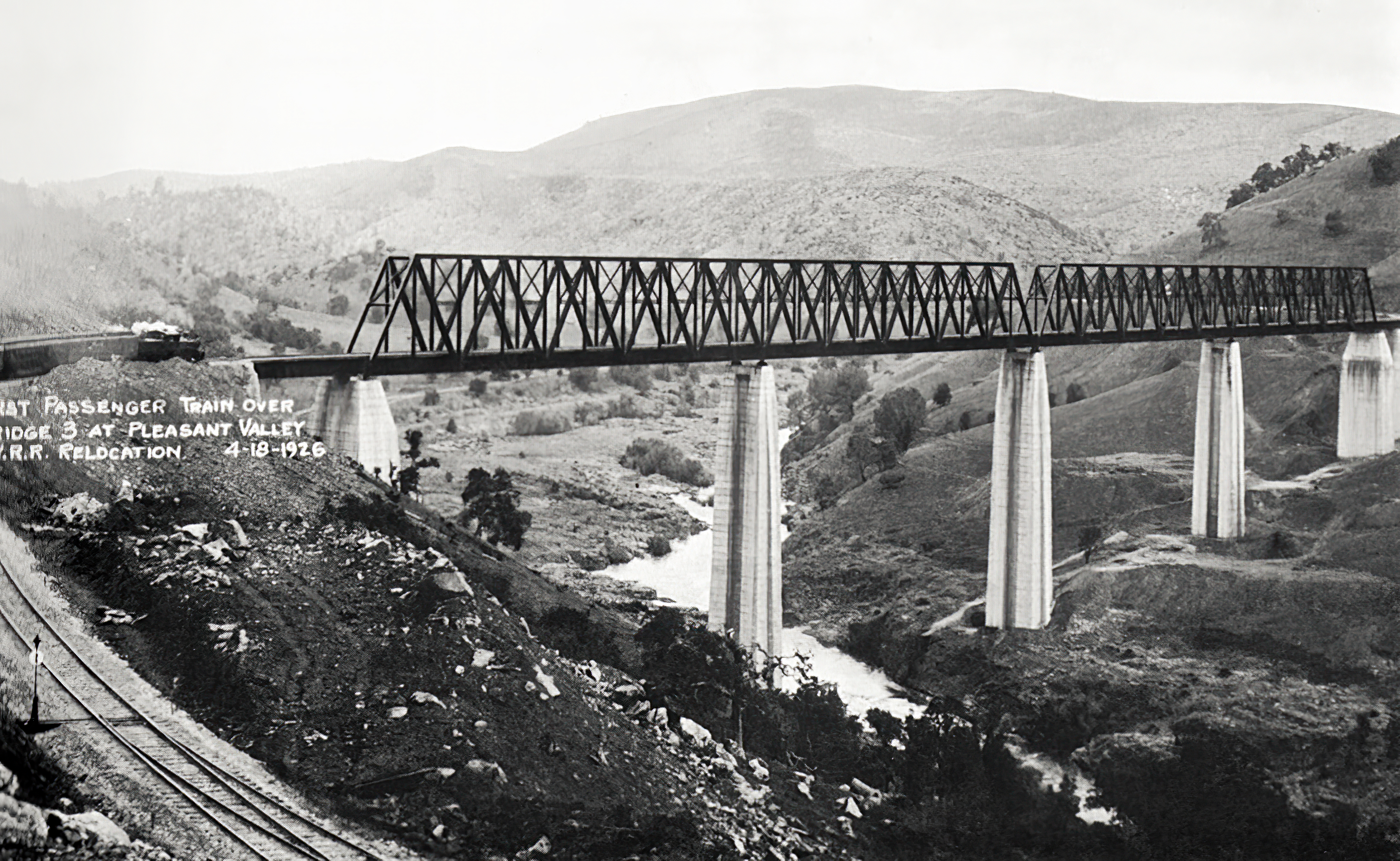
The first passenger train of the Yosemite Valley Railroad crossing Barrett Bridge in April 1926

The Yosemite Valley Railroad, originally built to serve mineral deposits in Yosemite Valley and Merced Canyon, continued operating through the early 20th century carrying tourists to Yosemite along the Merced River. El Portal Road, constructed through Merced Canyon in 1926, ended passenger service on the railway, but freight operations continued until the mid-1940s, when major flooding destroyed sections of the line.

In the early 20th century, while the upper Merced basin lay mostly protected, the lower river became the focus of dam-building and irrigation diversions by the Merced Irrigation District. The District built the Exchequer Dam, completed in the mid-1920s and raised in the 1960s, as a water storage facility on the Merced River.

Irrigation using water from the Merced River grew substantially until most of the arable land around the river – some 120,000 acres (490 km^{2}) – was under cultivation. By the late 1950s and early 1960s, irrigation in the San Joaquin Valley was so extensive that many rivers ran dry in sections. Upstream of the Merced's confluence with the San Joaquin, the latter river was usually dry, regaining flow only where the Merced entered. In the mid-20th century, diminished flow in the Merced River meant very few salmon returned to spawn in the lower section. In 1991, the Merced River Hatchery was built beside the river just downstream of the Crocker-Huffman Diversion Dam, the lowermost dam on the Merced. Fall chinook salmon travel up a fish ladder into the hatchery's pools, which are supplied with water diverted from the river.

Yosemite Valley sustained significant damage when the river flooded between December 31, 1996, to January 5, 1997. The flood was the worst in park history. The Merced River at Happy Isles peaked at 10,100 cubic feet per second during the flood. All roads out of Yosemite National Park were inundated, stranding 2100 visitors and park employees. Damaged facilities included the four main roads leading into the park, secondary roads throughout the park, major electrical, water and sewer systems, 439 employee bed spaces, over 500 guest lodging units, more than 350 campsites, 17 resource restoration projects and at least 10 known archeological sites. As a result of the damage caused by the flood waters, Yosemite was closed to the public until March 14, 1997, when the park was partially reopened for visitor use. Total park damages were estimated at $178 million.

In 2024, The New York Times reported that farmers had drained significant volumes of water during the 2022 drought, leaving part of the Merced dry without authorities being aware.

== River modifications ==
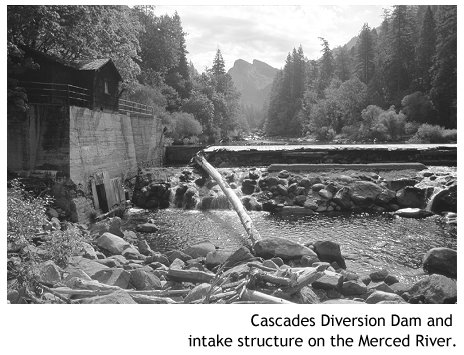
Cascades Diversion Dam before its removal in the 1990s

Despite its partial status as a National Wild and Scenic River, the Merced River has many dams and irrigation diversions. New Exchequer Dam is the largest dam on the river and forms Lake McClure, which holds 1,032,000 acre-feet (1.273×10^{9} m^{3}) of water for irrigation, flood control, and hydropower generation. This structure was preceded by the old Exchequer Dam, which formed a 281,000-acre-foot (347,000,000 m^{3}) reservoir. The old concrete arch dam, completed in 1926, was flooded when the new concrete-face rockfill dam was built in 1967, but it occasionally reappears during periods of low water.

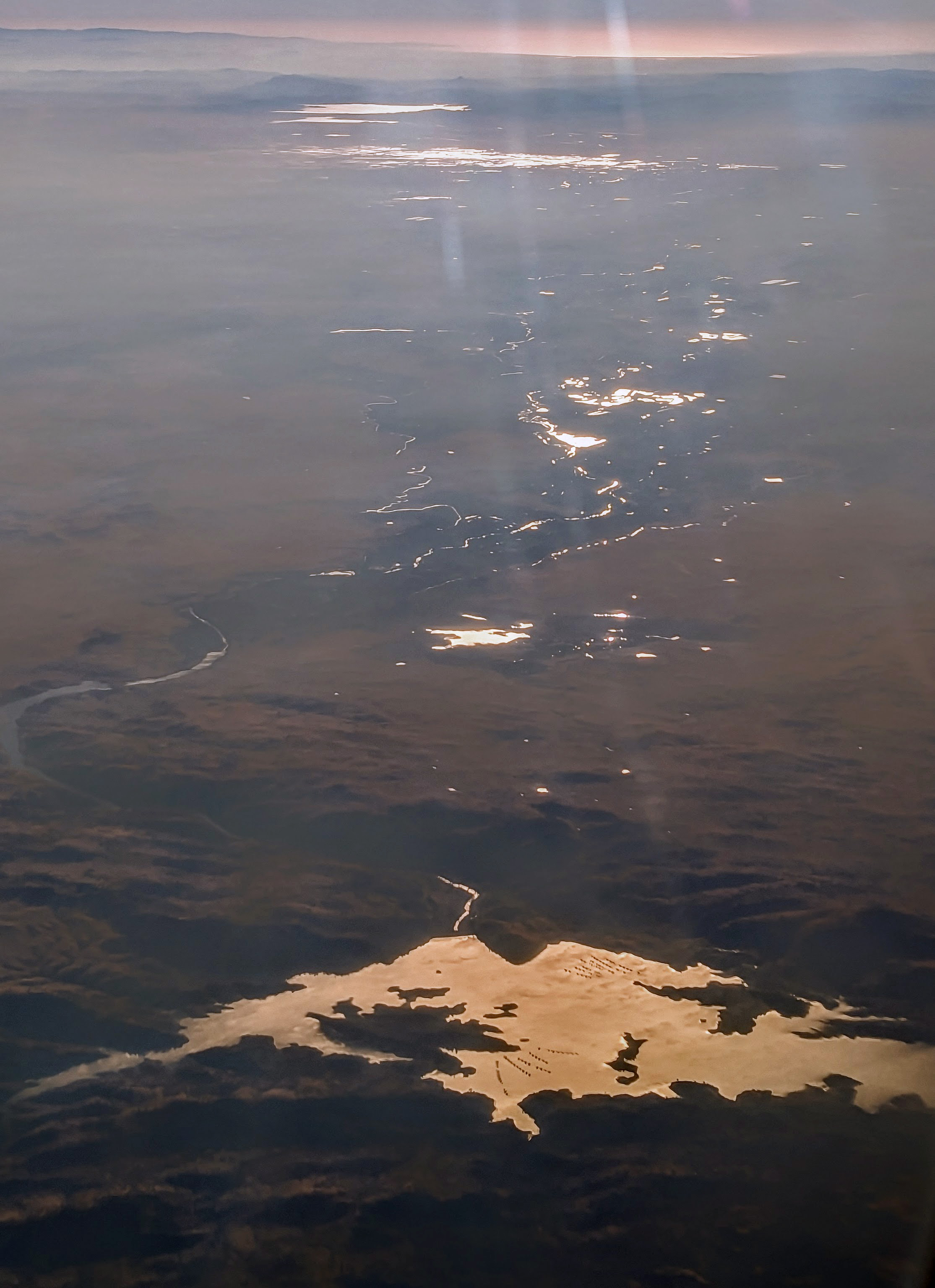
Aerial view of Lake McClure and the Merced River

Downstream of New Exchequer Dam is McSwain Dam, which serves as a regulating forebay for New Exchequer and also generates power. Below McSwain is Merced Falls Dam, an irrigation diversion dam. The lowermost dam, the Crocker-Huffman Diversion Dam, was built in 1906 and completely blocks the passage of anadromous fish up the Merced River. Together, these diversions remove almost half the river's natural flow, and an even greater proportion during dry years. For several months in 2022, all of the water in the river was diverted to agriculture.

Cascades Diversion Dam was a timber crib dam built in 1917 near where the Merced flows out of Yosemite Valley. Originally built to generate hydropower, the dam was decommissioned in 1985 but remained standing for years afterward. After the 1997 flood, the U.S. Bureau of Reclamation surveyed the dam and found it in danger of failure. Classified as a "high hazard" structure, it was considered for inclusion on the National Register of Historic Places but was deemed too dangerous, and was subsequently removed. Today, the Merced River above Lake McClure is completely free-flowing and unobstructed by any dams.

The Merced Irrigation District (MID) operates most of the irrigation infrastructure on the lower river, supplying water to 154,394 acres (624.81 km^{2}) of farmland. The system includes about 4,000 control gates and 793 miles (1,276 km) of canals and laterals. Irrigation has removed most of the water from the lower river, which is often reduced to a small stream at its confluence with the San Joaquin. Irrigation return flows carry pesticides, fertilizer, and other pollutants into the river. The MID is federally required to allow at least 15,000 acre-feet (19,000,000 m^{3}) of water annually to flow down the river, not including floodwater releases.

== Recreation ==
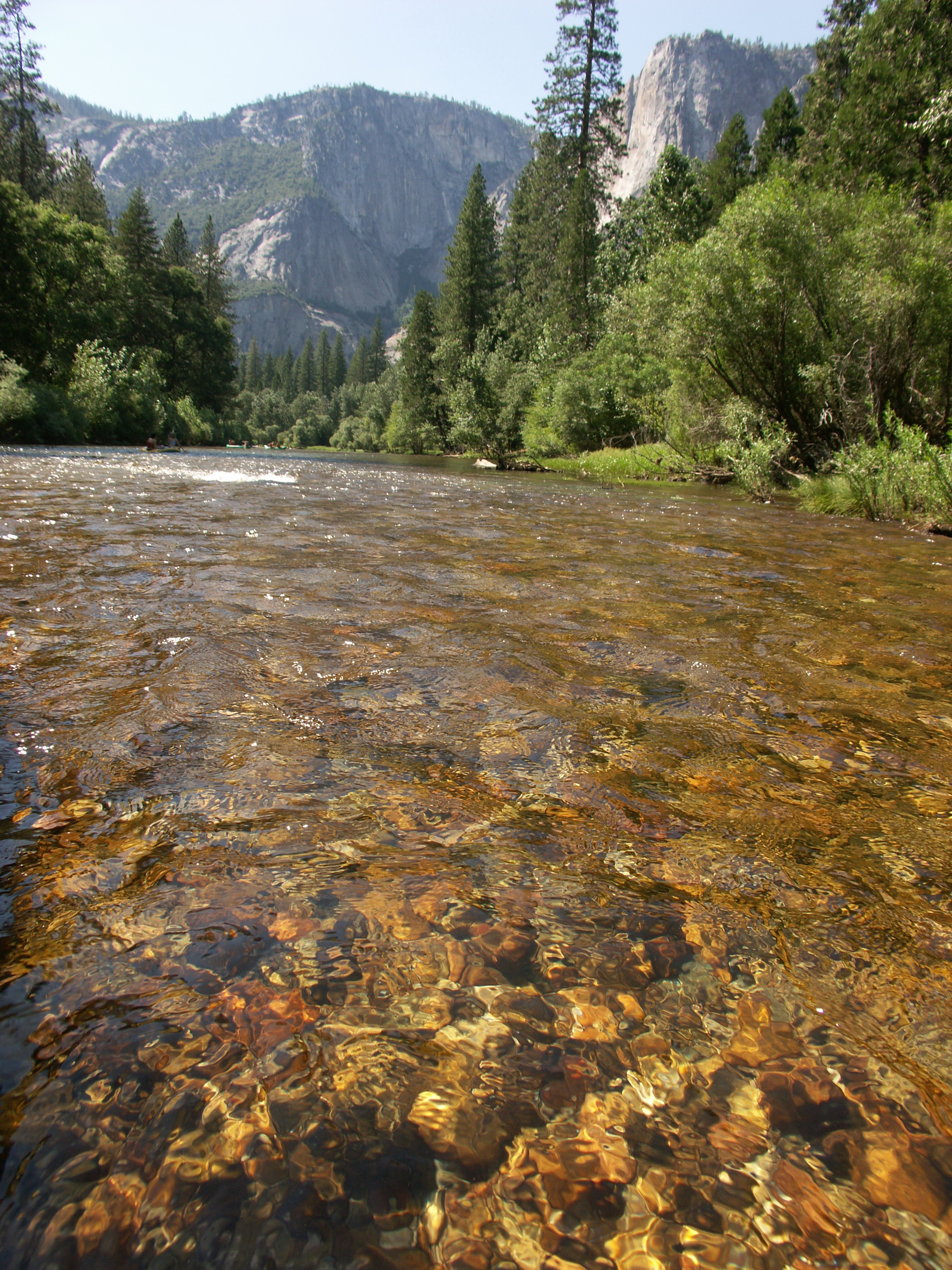
The Merced River in a stretch popular for boating and whitewater rafting in Yosemite

The Merced River and its tributaries are a popular recreational area, in part because of Yosemite National Park. Activities within the watershed include boating, fishing, camping, and hiking. Whitewater rafting is permitted throughout Merced River Canyon from the downstream half of Yosemite Valley to the entrance of Lake McClure. The most difficult rapids in this segment rate Class III and Class IV, mostly upstream of El Portal. Boating is also available on Lake McClure. Camping throughout the upper Merced watershed is generally permitted only in designated campgrounds. Campgrounds along the Merced River and its tributaries include sites at Railroad Flat, McCabe Flat, Willow Placer, Merced Lake, Vogelsang Lake, Sunrise Creek, May Lake, Bridalveil Creek, and a ski hut at Ostrander Lake, the source of Bridalveil Creek.

The name "Railroad Flat" comes from the Yosemite Valley Railroad, which once ran up Merced River Canyon into Yosemite Valley. The old railroad grade still exists and is now the site of a public trail. Many other trails lead throughout the Merced River watershed, notably the John Muir Trail, which starts near Happy Isles and climbs the Giant Staircase past Vernal and Nevada Falls into Little Yosemite Valley and north along Sunrise Creek to join the Pacific Crest Trail near Tuolumne Meadows. Trails also follow the river through Little Yosemite Valley to the headwaters, and along Illilouette, Bridalveil, Yosemite, Alder, and Chilnualna Creeks, and the lower South Fork of the Merced River. Some segments have no trails, including the lower Bridalveil Creek, the upper South Fork, and Tenaya Canyon, which is extremely dangerous.

== See also ==
- List of rivers of California
