= List of places in Arkansas: H =

Arkansas State Seal

This list of current cities, towns, unincorporated communities, and other recognized places in the U.S. state of Arkansas whose name begins with the letter H. It also includes information on the number and names of counties in which the place lies, and its lower and upper zip code bounds, if applicable.

Name of place	Number of counties	Principal county	Lower zip code	Upper zip code
Habberton	1	Washington County	72701	
Hackett	1	Sebastian County	72937	
Hagarville	1	Johnson County	72839	
Hagler	1	Arkansas County		
Haig	1	Pulaski County		
Haleside	1	Lee County		
Half Moon	1	Mississippi County	72319	
Halfway	1	Clark County		
Halley	1	Desha County	71638	
Halley Junction	1	Chicot County	71638	
Halliday	1	Greene County	72443	
Hallsville	1	Prairie County		
Halstead	1	Pulaski County	72205	
Hamburg	1	Ashley County	71646	
Hamil	1	Randolph County		
Hamilton	1	Garland County		
Hamilton	1	Lonoke County	72024	
Hamiter	1	Lonoke County	72142	
Hamlet	1	Faulkner County		
Hamlin	1	Cross County		
Hammons	1	Miller County		
Hammonsville	1	White County	72111	
Hampton	1	Calhoun County	71744	
Hancock	1	Craighead County	72447	
Hancock Junction	1	Craighead County		
Hand	1	Baxter County	72531	
Hand Valley	1	Marion County	72634	
Hannaberry	1	Jefferson County		
Hanover	1	Crittenden County		
Hanover	1	Stone County	72560	
Happy	1	White County	72143	
Happy Bend	1	Pope County	72823	
Happy Corners	1	Mississippi County	72438	
Hardin	1	Jefferson County	71601	
Hardy	2	Sharp County	72542	
Hardy	2	Fulton County	72542	
Haretown	1	Clark County		
Hargrave Corner	1	Clay County		
Hargraves Junction	1	Clay County	72461	
Harkle Road	1	Fulton County	72582	
Harlow	1	Calhoun County		
Harmon	1	Boone County		
Harmon	1	Washington County	72701	
Harmontown	1	Independence County	72501	
Harmony	1	Boone County	72601	
Harmony	1	Bradley County	71671	
Harmony	1	Columbia County	71753	
Harmony	1	Johnson County	72830	
Harmony	1	Madison County	72740	
Harmony	1	Nevada County		
Harmony	1	White County	72143	
Harmony Grove	1	Ouachita County	71701	
Harness	1	Stone County	72665	
Haroldton	1	Crawford County		
Harp	1	Hot Spring County		
Harrell	1	Calhoun County	71745	
Harriet	1	Searcy County	72639	
Harris	1	Washington County	72701	
Harrisburg	1	Poinsett County	72432	
Harrisburg Corner	1	Poinsett County		
Harrison	1	Boone County	72601	
Hart	1	White County		
Hartford	1	Sebastian County	72938	
Hartley	1	Polk County		
Hartman	1	Johnson County	72840	
Hartwell	1	Madison County	72740	
Harvard	1	Crittenden County		
Harvey	1	Scott County	72841	
Harwood	1	Chicot County		
Haskell	1	Saline County	72015	
Hasty	1	Newton County	72640	
Hatchie Coon	1	Poinsett County		
Hatfield	1	Polk County	71945	
Hattieville	1	Conway County	72063	
Hatton	1	Polk County	71946	
Havana	1	Yell County	72842	
Hawkins	1	St. Francis County		
Hayley	1	Prairie County	72040	
Haynes	1	Lee County	72341	
Haywood	1	Jefferson County	72152	
Hazel Grove	1	Independence County		
Hazel Valley	1	Washington County		
Hazen	1	Prairie County	72064	
Heafer	1	Crittenden County	72331	
Healing Springs	1	Benton County	72712	
Health	1	Madison County		
Hearn	1	Clark County	71923	
Heart	1	Fulton County	72539	
Heber Springs	1	Cleburne County	72543	
Hebron	1	Cleveland County	71660	
Hector	1	Pope County	72843	
Heelstring	1	Clay County		
Heffington	1	Jackson County		
Helena	1	Phillips County	72342	
Helena Crossing	1	Phillips County	72342	
Hempwallace	1	Garland County		
Henderson	1	Baxter County	72544	
Henderson College	1	Clark County	71923	
Hendrix College	1	Faulkner County	72032	
Henslee Heights	1	Jefferson County		
Hensley	1	Pulaski County	72065	
Hensley Ford	1	Searcy County		
Herbert	1	Lafayette County		
Herbert	1	Ouachita County	71701	
Herbine	1	Cleveland County	71665	
Hergett	1	Craighead County	72403	
Herma	1	Union County		
Herman	1	Craighead County		
Hermitage	1	Bradley County	71647	
Hermitage	1	Pulaski County	72206	
Herndon	1	Craighead County	72403	
Herpel	1	Stone County	72560	
Hervey	1	Miller County	75502	
Heth	1	St. Francis County	72346	
Heubner	1	Clay County		
Hickeytown	1	Johnson County	72847	
Hickman	1	Mississippi County	72319	
Hickoria	1	Clay County	72422	
Hickory Creek	1	Benton County		
Hickory Flat	1	White County	72121	
Hickory Grove	1	Yell County		
Hickory Hill	1	Conway County	72110	
Hickory Plains	1	Prairie County	72066	
Hickory Ridge	1	Cross County	72347	
Hickory Valley	1	Independence County	72521	
Hicks	1	Phillips County	72366	
Hicks	1	Washington County	72701	
Hicks Station	1	St. Francis County	72394	
Hidden Valley	1	Sharp County	72542	
Higden	1	Cleburne County	72067	
Higgins	1	Pulaski County	72206	
Higginson	1	White County	72068	
Highfill	1	Benton County	72734	
Highland	1	Pike County		
Highland	1	Polk County		
Highland	1	Sharp County	72542	
Highland Farm	1	Crittenden County		
Hightower	1	Mississippi County	72358	
Hill Creek	1	Conway County	72127	
Hillcrest	1	Johnson County	72830	
Hillcrest	1	Mississippi County		
Hillcrest	1	Pulaski County	72205	
Hillemann	1	Woodruff County	72101	
Hillsboro	1	Union County		
Hilo	1	Bradley County		
Hilton	1	Mississippi County		
Hindsville	1	Madison County	72738	
Hinkle	1	Johnson County		
Hiram	1	Cleburne County	72179	
Hiwasse	1	Benton County	72739	
Hobbs	1	Crawford County	72952	
Hobbtown	1	Crawford County		
Hogan	1	Lawrence County		
Hogeye	1	Washington County	72774	
Hog Jaw	1	Montgomery County		
Holdridge	1	Arkansas County		
Holiday Island	1	Carroll County	72632	
Holla Bend	1	Pope County		
Holland	1	Faulkner County	72173	
Holland	1	Lonoke County		
Hollis	1	Perry County	72857	
Holly Corner	1	Clay County	72461	
Holly Grove	1	Monroe County	72069	
Holly Island	1	Clay County	72461	
Holly Island Community	1	Clay County		
Holly Springs	1	Dallas County	71763	
Holly Springs	1	White County	72143	
Hollywood	1	Clark County	71923	
Holman	1	Johnson County	72846	
Holmes	1	Randolph County	72455	
Holub Crossing	1	Lee County	72360	
Homan	1	Miller County	75502	
Homewood	1	Perry County	72025	
Hon	1	Scott County	72958	
Hooker	1	Greene County	72450	
Hooker	1	Jefferson County	71601	
Hoop Spur	1	Phillips County		
Hope	1	Hempstead County	71801	
Hopeville	1	Calhoun County		
Hopewell	1	Boone County		
Hopewell	1	Cleburne County		
Hopewell	1	Greene County	72443	
Hopewell	1	Lawrence County	72433	
Hopper	1	Lee County		
Hopper	1	Montgomery County	71935	
Horatio	1	Sevier County	71842	
Horsehead	1	Columbia County		
Horseshoe	1	Jackson County	72112	
Horseshoe Bend	3	Fulton County	72536	
Horseshoe Bend	3	Izard County	72536	
Horseshoe Bend	3	Sharp County	72536	
Horseshoe Lake	1	Crittenden County	72512	
Hot Springs	1	Garland County	79101	
Hot Springs Junction	1	Pulaski County		
Hot Springs National Park	1	Garland County	71901	71951
Hot Springs Village	2	Garland County	71909	
Hot Springs Village	2	Saline County	71909	
Hough	1	Carroll County		
Houston	1	Perry County	72070	
Howard	1	Polk County		
Howell	1	Woodruff County	72071	
Hoxie	1	Lawrence County	72433	
Hoyt	1	Johnson County		
Hubbard	1	Washington County	72753	
Huddleston	1	Montgomery County	71961	
Hudspeth	1	Chicot County		
Huff	1	Independence County	72501	
Huffman	1	Mississippi County	72319	
Hughes	1	St. Francis County	72348	
Hulbert	1	Crittenden County	72301	
Huma	1	Phillips County		
Humnoke	1	Lonoke County	72072	
Humphrey	2	Arkansas County	72073	
Humphrey	2	Jefferson County	72073	
Hunt	1	Columbia County		
Hunt	1	Johnson County	72844	
Hunter	1	Woodruff County	72074	
Huntington	1	Sebastian County	72940	
Huntsville	1	Madison County	72740	
Hurds	1	Chicot County		
Hurricane Grove	1	Montgomery County	71957	
Hutchinson	1	Independence County	72534	
Hutson	1	Independence County	72564	
Huttig	1	Union County	71747	
Hyden	1	Arkansas County		
Hydrick	1	Poinsett County		

== Townships ==
Name of place	Number of counties	Principal county	Lower zip code	Upper zip code
Hadley Township	1	Lafayette County		
Hale Township	1	Garland County		
Half Moon Lake Township	1	Mississippi County		
Halley Township	1	Desha County		
Hamilton Township	1	Lonoke County		
Hampton Township	1	Lee County		
Hampton Township	1	Marion County		
Hardin Township	1	Faulkner County		
Hardy Township	1	Lee County		
Hardy Township	1	Sharp County		
Harmon Township	1	Washington County		
Harper Township	1	Cleveland County		
Harris Township	1	Stone County		
Harrison Township	1	Hot Spring County		
Harrison Township	1	Union County		
Harrison Township	1	White County		
Hartford Township	1	Sebastian County		
Hartsell Township	1	White County		
Hartsugg Township	1	Van Buren County		
Harve Township	1	Faulkner County		
Haskell Township	1	Saline County		
Hasty Township	1	Newton County		
Hays Township	1	Greene County		
Haywood Township	1	Clay County		
Hazen Township	1	Prairie County		
Healing Springs Township	1	Cleburne County		
Heber Township	1	Cleburne County		
Hector Township	1	Mississippi County		
Henderson Township	1	Hot Spring County		
Henderson Township	1	Union County		
Henton Township	1	Arkansas County		
Herd Township	1	Stone County		
Herndon Township	1	Craighead County		
Herring Township	1	Yell County		
Heth Township	1	St. Francis County		
Hickey Township	1	Johnson County		
Hickman Township	1	Mississippi County		
Hickman Township	1	Scott County		
Hickory Township	1	Carroll County		
Hickory Grove Township	1	Newton County		
Hickory Plain Township	1	Prairie County		
Hickory Ridge Township	1	Cross County		
Hickory Ridge Township	1	Phillips County		
Hicksville Township	1	Phillips County		
Hico Township	1	Benton County		
Higgins Township	1	Conway County		
Higginson Township	1	White County		
Highland Township	1	Sharp County		
Hilburn Township	1	Madison County		
Hill Township	1	Independence County		
Hill Township	1	Johnson County		
Hill Township	1	Pulaski County		
Hindman Township	1	Monroe County		
Hixson Township	1	Stone County		
Hogan Township	1	Franklin County		
Holland Township	1	Saline County		
Holley Township	1	Van Buren County		
Holly Creek Township	1	Howard County		
Holly Mountain Township	1	Van Buren County		
Holly Springs Township	1	Dallas County		
Homan Township	1	Miller County		
Hon Township	1	Scott County		
Hoover Township	1	Benton County		
Hopewell Township	1	Greene County		
Hopper Township	1	Montgomery County		
Hornor Township	1	Phillips County		
Horsehead Township	1	Johnson County		
Hot Springs Township	1	Garland County		
Houston Township	1	Perry County		
Howard Township	1	Conway County		
Howell Township	1	Johnson County		
Hudgin Township	1	Cleveland County		
Hudson Township	1	Newton County		
Huey Township	1	Calhoun County		
Huff Township	1	Independence County		
Hunt Township	1	Scott County		
Hurricane Township	1	Cleveland County		
Hurricane Township	1	Franklin County		
Hurricane Township	1	Greene County		
Hurricane Township	1	Saline County		
