= Horseshoe (disambiguation) =

Horseshoe is a shoe for horses and by analogy is applied to many things with a similar shape.

Horseshoes (game), a tossing game played with a horseshoe

Horseshoe(s) or Horse Shoe(s) may also refer to:

== Places ==
=== Settlements and jurisdictions ===
- Horse Shoe, North Carolina, a town near a lake with the same name
- Horseshoe, Arkansas, an unincorporated community
- Horseshoe, Jersey City, a ward of Jersey City, New Jersey
- Horseshoe, Western Australia, an abandoned town
- Horseshoe Bend (disambiguation), a number of places
- Horse Shoe Curve, Virginia, an unincorporated community

=== Landforms and geology ===
- Horseshoe Bay (disambiguation), various localities
- Horseshoe Canyon (Alberta), Canada
- Horseshoe Canyon (Utah), US
- Horseshoe Harbour, Antarctica
- Horseshoe Mountain (Colorado), US
- Horseshoe Valley (disambiguation)
- The Horseshoe (Vietnam)

=== Facilities and structures ===
- Ohio Stadium or the Horseshoe, a football stadium for Ohio State University
- The Horseshoe, a quadrangle in the Old Campus District of the University of South Carolina

==== Hospitality ====
- Binion's Horseshoe, a casino
- Horseshoe Bossier City, a casino in Louisiana
- Horseshoe Casino Baltimore, a Caesars Entertainment Casino in Maryland
- Horseshoe Hammond, a casino
- Horseshoe Indianapolis, a casino in Indianapolis
- Horseshoe Las Vegas, a casino in Las Vegas Strip
- Horseshoe St. Louis, a casino in Louisiana
- Horseshoe Casino Tunica, a casino
- Horseshoe Resort, or Horseshoe Valley Ski Club, a ski resort in southern Ontario
- Horseshoe Southern Indiana, formerly Caesars Indiana
- Horseshoe Tavern, a bar in downtown Toronto

== Animals ==
- Atlantic horseshoe crab, Limulus polyphemus
- Horseshoe crab, a marine arthropod
- Horseshoe bat

== Arts, entertainment, and media ==
- Horse Shoes (1927 film), a film starring Monty Banks and Jean Arthur
- Horseshoes (1923 film), a film starring Oliver Hardy
- "Horseshoes" (song), a 2000 song by Adam Gregory
- Horseshoes (game), a tossing game played with a horseshoe
- "Horseshoe", a 2014 song by Withered Hand from New Gods
- "Horseshoe", a 2025 song by Tate McRae from So Close to What

== Transportation ==
- Horseshoe Bridge, Perth, Western Australia
- Horseshoe curve, in roads and railways
- Horseshoe Curve (Pennsylvania), a famous railroad curve
- Horseshoe route, a WWII air route
- Horseshoe run, a 19th-century steamship route

== Other uses ==
- Horseshoe (symbol), "⊃", a logical connective meaning material conditional in propositional logic
- Horseshoe cloud, a meteorological phenomenon
- Horseshoe magnet
- Horseshoe map, in chaos theory
- Horseshoe moustache
- Horseshoe sandwich, an open-faced sandwich found regionally in the Midwest
- Horseshoe theory, in political science
- Horseshoe vortex, simplified model of the vortex system in the airflow around a wing
- Ʊ (minuscule: ʊ), also called horseshoe u, a letter of the International Phonetic Alphabet

== See also ==
- omega ("Ω")
- upsilon ("υ")
- superset ("⊃")
- subset ("⊂")
- mho ("℧") inverse of ohm
- U (letter "u")
- Shoe (disambiguation)
- Horse (disambiguation)
