= Lamar School District =

School district in Arkansas

Location
- 301 Elberta Street; Lamar, Arkansas 72846 United States

District information
- Motto: Roll Tribe
- Grades: PK–12
- Superintendent: Jay Holland
- Accreditation: Arkansas Department of Education
- Schools: 3
- NCES District ID: 0508700

Students and staff
- Students: 1,566
- Teachers: 88.59 (on FTE basis)
- Staff: 170.59 (on FTE basis)
- Student–teacher ratio: 12.26
- Athletic conference: 3A 4 (2012–16)
- District mascot: Warrior
- Colors: Black; Orange

Other information
- Website: www.lamarwarriors.org

Lamar School District is a public school district based in Lamar, Arkansas, United States. The school district supports more than 1,566 students in prekindergarten through grade 12 in the 2015-16 school year by employing more than 170 faculty and staff on a full time equivalent basis for its three schools.

The school district encompasses 299.95 square miles (776.9 km^{2}) of land in Johnson County and Pope County and serves all or portions of Lamar, London, Clarksville, Ozone, Knoxville, and Hagarville.

== Schools ==
Interscholastic activities at the junior varsity and varsity level are played at the 3A Classification level within the 3A 4 Conference as administered by the Arkansas Activities Association. The mascot for the schools is the Warrior.

- Lamar High School, serving more than 500 students in grades 8 through 12.
- Lamar Middle School, serving more than 400 students in grades 4 through 7.
- Lamar Elementary School, serving more than 500 students in prekindergarten through grade 3.
