= Arkansas Highway 359 =

State highway in Arkansas, United States

Highway 359

Route information
- Maintained by ArDOT
- Length: 12.85 mi (20.68 km)

Major junctions
- South end: US 64 near Piney
- North end: US 64 at Lamar

Location
- Country: United States
- State: Arkansas
- Counties: Johnson

Highway system
- Arkansas Highway System; Interstate; US; State; Business; Spurs; Suffixed; Scenic; Heritage
← AR 358	→ AR 360

Highway 359 (AR 359, Ark. 359, and Hwy. 359) is a north–south state highway in Johnson County, United States. The route of 12.85 miles (20.68 km) runs north from U.S. Route 64 (US 64) near Piney to US 64 in Lamar.

== Route description ==
Highway 359 begins at US 64 near Piney in the southeastern corner of the county near the Arkansas River. The route runs underneath Interstate 40 (I-40) but does not have access to the freeway. Continuing north, Highway 359 passes Piney Bay and Hickeytown before curving west and serving as the southern terminus of Highway 315. The route continues west, entering Lamar and terminating at US 64.

== Major intersections ==
The entire route is in Johnson County.

Location	mi	km	Destinations	Notes
	0.00	0.00	US 64 – Knoxville, Clarksville, London, Russellville	Southern terminus
	9.45	15.21	AR 315 north – Lutherville	AR 315 southern terminus
Lamar	12.85	20.68	US 64 (Main Street) – Russellville, Clarksville	Northern terminus
1.000 mi = 1.609 km; 1.000 km = 0.621 mi
