= Westside High School (Johnson County, Arkansas) =

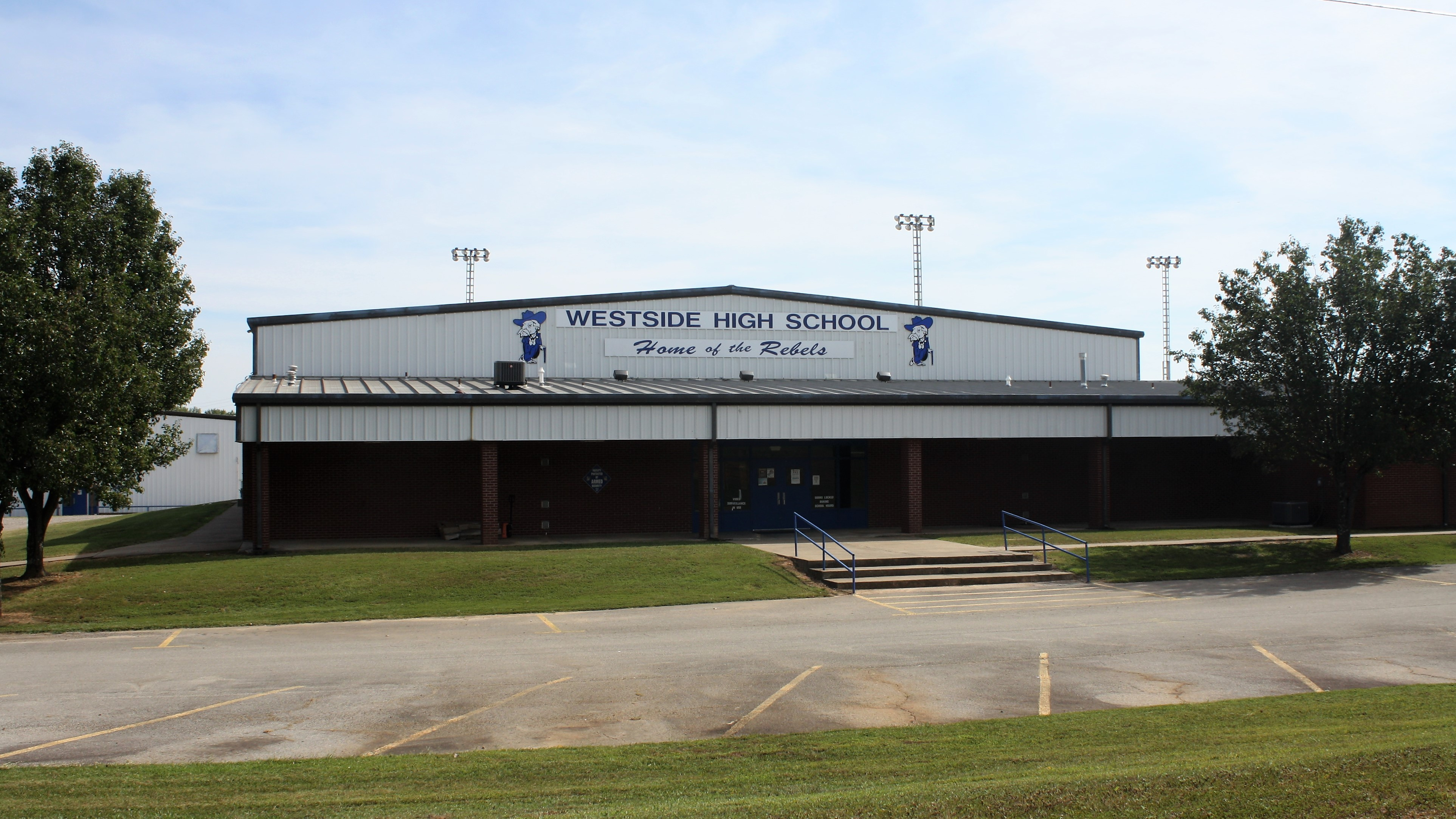

Location
- 400 Hwy 164 North; Coal Hill, Arkansas 72832; United States
- Coordinates: 35°26′31″N 93°39′14″W

Information
- School type: Public (government funded)
- Status: Open
- School district: Westside School District
- NCES District ID: 0514020
- Authority: Arkansas Department of Education (ADE)
- CEEB code: 040475
- NCES School ID: 051402001267
- Grades: 7–12
- Enrollment: 332 (2023–2024)
- Student to teacher ratio: 13.19
- Education system: ADE Smart Core curriculum
- Classes offered: Regular; Career Focus; Advanced Placement (AP)
- Colors: Royal blue and white
- Athletics conference: 2A Region 4 (Football); 2A Region 4 West (Basketball)
- Mascot: Rebel
- Team name: Westside Rebels
- Feeder schools: Westside Elementary School
- Affiliation: Arkansas Activities Association
- Website: whs.westsideschools.org

Westside High School is a comprehensive public high school located in the Coal Hill campus in unincorporated Johnson County, Arkansas, United States. The school serves the westside communities of Johnson County, including Coal Hill and Hartman for students in grades 7 through 12. It is the sole high school of Westside School District and is commonly referred to as Johnson County Westside or Westside – Johnson County to distinguish itself from the Jonesboro Westside High School.

As of 2017 the school had 285 students.

== Academics ==
This Title I school is accredited by the Arkansas Department of Education (ADE). The assumed course of study follows the Smart Core curriculum developed the Arkansas Department of Education (ADE), which requires students to complete at least 22 credit units before graduation. Students engage in regular (core) and career focus courses and exams and may select Advanced Placement (AP) coursework and exams that may lead to college credit.

== Athletics ==
The Westside Johnson County High School mascot and athletic emblem is the Rebel with school colors of blue and silver.

The Westside Rebels participate in various interscholastic activities in the 2A Classification—the state's second smallest classification—within the 2A Region 4 (Football) Conference and 2A Region 4 West (Basketball) Conference administered by the Arkansas Activities Association. The school's athletic activities include football, golf (boys/girls), cross country (boys/girls), basketball (boys/girls), baseball, softball, and track and field (boys/girls).

- Track and field: The girls track and field teams won two state championship titles (2007, 2009).
