= Heartwell =

Heartwell may refer to:

- Heartwell, Nebraska, United States
- George Heartwell (fl. 2004–2016), mayor of Grand Rapids, Michigan, United States
- Heartwell Park Historic District, on the National Register of Historic Places listings in Adams County, Nebraska

== See also ==
- RNLB Louisa Heartwell (ON 495) (1902–1932), a lifeboat stationed at Cromer, Norfolk, England
- Hartville (disambiguation)
- Hartwell (disambiguation)
- Heartwellville, Vermont, United States
