= Lamar High School (Arkansas) =

Location
- 301 Elberta Street; Lamar, Johnson, Arkansas 72846; United States; 35°26′5″N 93°23′46″W

Information
- School type: Public comprehensive
- Status: Open
- School district: Lamar School District
- Superintendent: Jay Holland
- CEEB code: 041350
- NCES School ID: 050870000585
- Teaching staff: 45.69 (on FTE basis)
- Grades: 9–12
- Enrollment: 360 (2023-2024)
- Student to teacher ratio: 7.88
- Education system: ADE Smart Core
- Classes offered: Regular, Advanced Placement (AP)
- Colors: Black and orange
- Athletics conference: 3A Region 4
- Mascot: Warriors
- Team name: Lamar Warriors
- Rival: Clarksville High School
- Accreditation: ADE
- Website: www.lamarwarriors.org/page/lamar-high-school

Lamar High School is a comprehensive public high school located in Lamar, Arkansas, United States. The school provides secondary education for students in grades 9 through 12. It is one of four public high schools in Johnson County. It is the sole high school administered by the Lamar School District with Lamar Middle School serving as its main feeder school.

== Academics ==
Lamar High School is accredited by the Arkansas Department of Education (ADE). The assumed course of study follows the ADE Smart Core curriculum, which requires students complete at least 22 units prior to graduation. Students complete regular coursework and exams and may take Advanced Placement (AP) courses and exam with the opportunity to receive college credit.

== Athletics ==
The Lamar High School mascot and athletic emblem is the Warrior with black and orange serving as the school colors.

For 2012–14, the Lamar Warriors participate in interscholastic activities within the 3A Classification via the 3A Region 4 Conference, as administered by the Arkansas Activities Association. The Warriors compete in football, cross country (boys/girls), golf (boys/girls), bowling (boys/girls), basketball (boys/girls), baseball, softball, track and field (boys/girls), and cheer.
