= C. W. Melson =

American politician (1929–1981)

Cyrus William "C. W." Melson

Arkansas State Representative for Johnson County
- In office 1977 – June 19, 1981

Personal details
- Born: July 9, 1929 Arkansas, USA
- Died: June 19, 1981 (aged 51)
- Resting place: Mt. Airy Cemetery in Ludwig in Johnson County, Arkansas
- Spouse: Kathleen Neeley Melson (married 1947-1981, his death)
- Parent(s): Virgil "Jack" Dale, Sr., and Lillian Ellen Bump Melson
- Occupation: Assemblies of God minister

Cyrus William "C.W." Melson (July 9, 1929 – June 19, 1981) was a Republican member of the Arkansas House of Representatives from the unincorporated Ozone community in Johnson County in northwestern Arkansas. He served from 1977 until his death in the office.

Melson is interred at the Airy Memorial Cemetery in Ludwig in Johnson County, Arkansas.
