= Westside School District =

School district in Arkansas

Westside School District is a public school district serving western Johnson County, Arkansas, United States. The school district serves the rural communities of Hartman, Coal Hill and surrounding unincorporated areas.

The school district, headquartered in the Coal Hill Campus, located an unincorporated area next to Coal Hill, consists of two separate facilities for elementary and secondary education. The district is often referred to as Westside – Johnson County to distinguish itself from West Side – Cleburne County and Westside Consolidated – Craighead County school districts.

The Coal Hill and Hartman school districts merged into Westside effective July 1, 1983.

== Schools ==
The district and each of its two schools mascot and athletic emblem is the Rebel.

- Westside High School – provides secondary education for grades 7 through 12; based in the Coal Hill campus in an unincorporated area.
- Westside Elementary School – provides early childhood and elementary education for prekindergarten through grade 6; based in Hartman.
