= Horseshoe Bay =

Horseshoe Bay may refer to:

== Antarctica ==
- Horseshoe Bay (South Georgia), on Barff Peninsula
- Horseshoe Bay (Ross Island)

== Australia ==
- Horseshoe Bay (New South Wales), on the shore of which Bermagui, New South Wales is situated
- Horseshoe Bay, Queensland, a bay and town on Magnetic ISland
- Horseshoe Bay (South Australia), on the shore of which Port Elliot, South Australia is situated

== Bermuda ==
- Horseshoe Bay, Bermuda, a beach

== Canada ==
- Horseshoe Bay, Alberta, a summer village
- Horseshoe Bay, Saskatchewan, a hamlet
- Horseshoe Bay, West Vancouver, a neighbourhood in British Columbia
- Horseshoe Bay ferry terminal, a ferry terminal in British Columbia

== United Kingdom ==
- Horseshoe Bay, Isle of Wight, at the east end of the headland of Culver Down
- Horseshoe Bay no.2, Isle of Wight, near Bonchurch

== United States ==
- Horseshoe Bay Wilderness, Michigan
- Horseshoe Bay, Texas, a city
