= Horseshoe Bend =

Horseshoe Bend may refer to:

== Places ==
=== Australia ===
- Horseshoe Bend, New South Wales, an inner city suburb in the City of Maitland in the Hunter Region
- Horseshoe Bend Station, a pastoral lease that operates as a cattle station in the Alice Springs region of the Northern Territory

=== United Kingdom ===
- Horseshoe Bend, Shirehampton, an 11 acres (4.5 ha) biological Site of Special Scientific Interest in Bristol, England

=== United States ===
- Battle of Horseshoe Bend (1814) in Alabama, a battle of the Creek War
  - location of Horseshoe Bend National Military Park
- Horseshoe Bend (Arizona), a meander of the Colorado River in Arizona
- Horseshoe Bend, Arkansas, a city in Fulton, Izard, and Sharp counties in northeastern Arkansas
- Horseshoe Bend, California, a placer and hydraulic gold mining camp along the Merced River, now covered by the waters of Lake McClure
- Horseshoe Bend, Idaho, a city in Boise County, Idaho
- Horseshoe Bend, Texas, a census-designated place in Parker County, Texas
- Horseshoe bend of the Ohio River
- Battle of Horseshoe Bend (1832), a battle of the Black Hawk War which took place in Wisconsin

== See also ==
- Horseshoe Curve (disambiguation)
