= 2283 =

2283 is a number in the 2000s range.

2283 may also refer to:

== Time ==
- 2283 CE, a year in the 23rd century CE
- 2283 BC, a year Before the Common Era

== Places ==
- 2283 Bunke, asteroid #2283, the 2283rd asteroid registered, also known as the Asteroid Bunke, a main-belt asteroid
- Texas Farm to Market Road 2283 (highway 2283), Texas, USA

== Flights ==
- 2021 Sunwing Airlines party incident, a 30 December 2021 flight that violated COVID-19 protocols and where passengers engaged in an uncontrolled onboard party
- Voepass Linhas Aéreas Flight 2283, a 9 August 2024 flight that crashed near Sao Paulo, Brazil; operating aboard an ATR-72 turboprop airliner

== Other uses ==
- Unicode codepoint 2283 (U+2283), the character Horseshoe (symbol)

== See also ==
- 283 (number)
