= Harwell =

Harwell may refer to:

== People ==
- Harwell (surname)
- Harwell Hamilton Harris (1903–1990), American architect

== Places ==
- Harwell, Nottinghamshire, England, a hamlet
- Harwell, Oxfordshire, England, a village
  - RAF Harwell, a World War II RAF airfield, near Harwell village.
  - Harwell Science and Innovation Campus, the current official name of the former RAF Harwell site
  - Atomic Energy Research Establishment
- Harwell Glacier, in Antarctica

== Other uses ==
- Harwell-Boeing file format

== See also ==
- Hartwell (disambiguation)
