= Hartnell =

Hartnell is an English surname. Notable people with this surname include the following:

- Andy Hartnell, American comic book writer
- Bryan Calvin Hartnell, only survivor of the Zodiac Killer in California, 1969
- John Hartnell, English seaman and explorer on Franklin's lost expedition to find the Northwest Passage
- Sir Norman Hartnell (1901–1979), English fashion designer
- Scott Hartnell (born 1982), Canadian professional ice hockey player
- Tim Hartnell (1951–1991), an Australian journalist
- William Hartnell (1908–1975), English actor who portrayed the First Doctor in the BBC's Doctor Who
- William Edward Petty Hartnell otherwise Don Guillermo Arnel (1798–1854), English-born merchant and administrator in California

== Other uses ==
- Hartnell (horse) (foaled 2011), a British racehorse,

== See also ==
- Hartnoll - as a surname
- Hartwell (disambiguation)
- Hartnell College
