= Gillian Settlement, Arkansas =

Unincorporated community in Johnson County, Arkansas

Gillian Settlement is an unincorporated community in Johnson County, Arkansas, United States.

The community is located on Farm Road 1475 approximately 1.5 miles east of Arkansas Route 21 at 35°37′54″N 93°24′07″W and an elevation of 1654 feet. Clarksville is 10.6 miles to the south-southwest.
