= Pittsburg, Arkansas =

Coordinates: 35°26′02″N 93°22′34″W

Pittsburg is an unincorporated community in Johnson County, Arkansas, United States. It is located at a latitude of 35.4375 and a longitude of -93.36944 and was named after the industrial heritage of Pittsburgh, Pennsylvania.
