= Chase (video game) =

Turn-based computer game

Chase is a turn-based video game in which players are tasked with escaping from robots programmed to pursue and kill them. The player attempts to destroy the robots by moving in such a way that the robots collide with each other or other obstacles. The basic concept has been part of games stretching into the 1970s, and is among the earliest of the "standards" for microcomputer platforms. Many variations exist, the most notable being the home computer-based Escape! and Zombies, Daleks on Mac OS and robots on Unix.

The original author of the game remains unknown, but it is highly likely it started on the DTSS system at Dartmouth College in the early 1970s. The first public versions appeared in Creative Computing magazine in early 1976 and a variety of modified versions appeared over the next few years. Daleks and robots both appeared in 1984, leading to another wave of similar versions. New ports continue to appear to this day.

== Gameplay ==
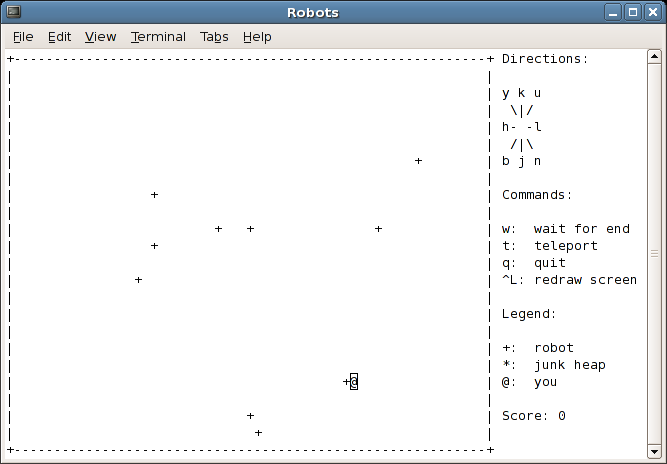
BSD robots is very similar to the original Chase.

Chase is played on a two-dimensional rectangular grid. The objective of the game is to escape from a number of robots, which have been programmed to kill the player.

The game is turn-based. In the original game, the player character starts in a random location. In some derivative versions, such as the GNOME version, the player starts at the centre of the grid. The robots start in random locations on the grid. Every time the player character moves in any direction (horizontally, vertically, or diagonally), each robot moves one square closer to their new location, in whichever direction is the shortest path to the player. If the player character collides with a robot, they die and the game ends.

The player attempts to survive by causing the robots to kill themselves by colliding with other objects on the map. There are two major ways this occurs. In earlier versions derived from Chase!, there are a number of deadly objects on the map that will kill either the robots or the player. In later versions derived from robots, the map is initially clear and these hazards are created when two robots collide to create a pile of rubble. In either case, the player is attempting to move in such a way to cause the robots to collide with each other or stationary obstacles.

The player can also teleport to a random location in cases where escape is otherwise impossible. Teleportation counts as a move, and the robots will respond by moving towards the new location. Since the location is randomly selected, it is possible for the player to teleport right into the path of a robot. In some versions of the game, there is a "safe teleport" feature which the player may use a limited number of times (for instance once per level) and there may also be a close-range weapon that kills all robots within the immediate vicinity, the use of which would be limited in a similar way.

A few versions also add a tank, which is not destroyed when colliding with other objects and acts similarly to the other robots.

The game is won when all of the robots are destroyed. In modern versions, this normally results in the game proceeding to another level with more robots. Traditionally, the number of robots increases by ten each level.

== Other versions ==
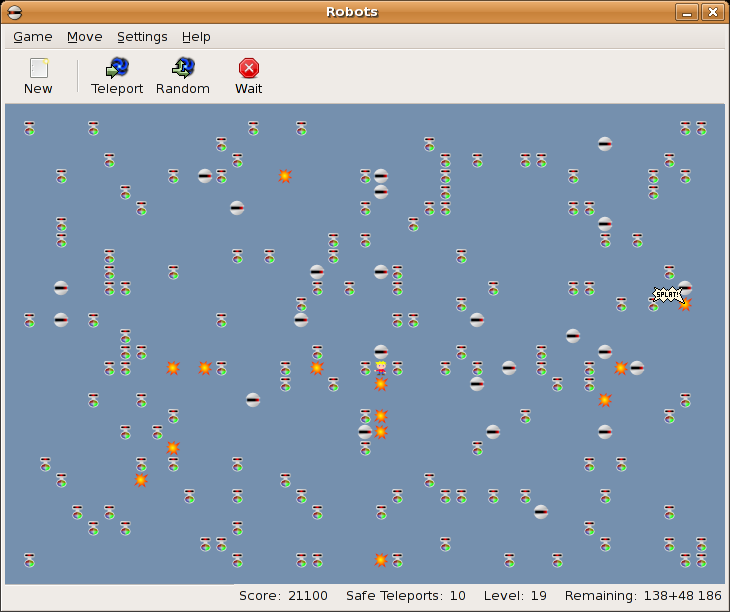
GNOME robots replaces the character graphics with sprites.

Chase was originally written in Dartmouth BASIC on the DTSS system at Dartmouth College. The author is unknown and original versions of the source code have not been found.

The Jan-Feb 1976 issue of Creative Computing contains a version of this original code ported to the Honeywell 6000 series by Bill Cotter. (Note: The Honeywell 6000 series was a re-badged GE-600 series, which is the same machine as the DTSS system of the same era.) It was republished in 1979's More BASIC Computer Games, at that time adding a note suggesting the original author was Mac Oglesby, a prolific game author of Dartmouth BASIC games from the mainframe era. (Note: In an email, Mac stated he was not the original author of the game. Bill Cotter stated that he saw the original on either a DECUS tape or the Dartmouth Time-Sharing System. DECUS shows no similar program. It appears that David H. Ahl was aware of its origins on the DTSS system and naturally ascribed it to Mac based on his prodigious output. The original author remains unknown.)

A series of relatively direct copies of this game appeared in computer magazines of the era, including one for the SWCP 4k BASIC, and a graphical version using the VDM-1 card for S-100 bus machines. It was also ported to the PLATO system's TUTOR language on the MODCOMP IV as HiVolts.. A real time version of Chase called Logan was ported to the HP-2000 by Jim Burnes at St. Louis University High School. It used the 2D addressable cursor of a VT52 video terminal to generate the play field. It became so popular that it monopolized the entire computer center within a month and was subsequently deleted off the system.

Many follow-up versions of the game were known as Escape!, although it is not clear when this name was first used. One such version appears in Announcing: Computer Games for the TRS-80, which added another enemy, the tank, and limited the player to two teleports per match. A commercial graphical version of Escape! was also sold by Sublogic as early as 1982, which added a real-time option that caused the robots to move even if the user didn't. A review of this version in Creative Computing once again attributed the original to Mac Oglesby.

A modified version of Escape! known as Robot Minefield was released in 1983 by Tim Hartnell and Nathan Butcher. This reduced the number of enemies to four and eliminated the tank. In addition, the player could only move in four directions (North, South, East, West) while the robots had the ability to move diagonally. The game was played in real time; as the player pondered his move, the robots would continue converging toward him. This version was published in the 1983 Giant Book of Computer Games.

The Unix-based robots was developed by Allan R. Black in November 1984. In May 1985, it was posted to the Usenet newsgroup net.sources.games. It was then ported to the Berkeley Software Distribution by Ken Arnold. The BSD Unix version of robots first appeared in the 4.3BSD software release in June 1986.

== See also ==
- Robotron: 2084, a real-time version
