= Hartwell =

Hartwell may refer to:

== Places ==
- Hartwell, Victoria, a neighbourhood of Camberwell in Melbourne, Australia
  - Hartwell railway station

=== England ===
- Hartwell, Buckinghamshire
- Hartwell, Northamptonshire, a village
- Hartwell, Staffordshire, a location

=== United States ===
- Hartwell, Arkansas, a place in Arkansas
- Hartwell, Cincinnati, Ohio, a neighborhood
- Hartwell, Georgia, a city
  - Hartwell Lakeside Park
  - Lake Hartwell
  - Hartwell Dam
  - Hartwell Railroad
  - Hartwell Speedway
- Hartwell, Indiana, an unincorporated community
- Hartwell, Missouri

== Other uses ==
- Hartwell (surname)
- Hartwell (1787 ship), 18th Century East Indiaman
  - Hartwell Mutiny, on the above
- Hartwell Tavern, structure in Massachusetts
- Hartwell baronets, a United Kingdom hereditary title
- Michael Berry, Baron Hartwell, a British newspaper proprietor and journalist

== See also ==
- Harpswell, Lincolnshire, England
- Harpswell, Maine, United States
- Hartnell
- Harwell (disambiguation)
- Heartwell (disambiguation)
- Hardwell
