= Horseshoe Curve (disambiguation) =

A horseshoe curve is a track layout used to reduce the gradient a train must travel uphill.

Horseshoe Curve may also refer to:

- Horseshoe Curve (Pennsylvania), a railroad curve on the Norfolk Southern Railway's Pittsburgh Line
- Horse Shoe Curve, Virginia
- The Horseshoe Curve, an album by Trey Anastasio
