= Lamar, Arkansas =

- City
- Location of Lamar in Johnson County, Arkansas
- Coordinates: 35°26′37″N 93°23′42″W
- Country: United States
- State: Arkansas
- County: Johnson

Area
  - Total: 4.64 sq mi (12.03 km^{2})
  - Land: 4.61 sq mi (11.95 km^{2})
  - Water: 0.027 sq mi (0.07 km^{2})
- Elevation: 430 ft (130 m)

Population (2020)
  - Total: 1,719
  - Estimate (2025): 1,776 ▲
  - Density: 372/sq mi (143.8/km^{2})
- Time zone: UTC-6 (Central (CST))
  - Summer (DST): UTC-5 (CDT)
- ZIP code: 72846
- Area code: 479
- FIPS code: 05-38290
- GNIS feature ID: 2404879

Lamar is a city in Johnson County, Arkansas, United States. As of the 2020 census, Lamar had a population of 1,719.

== Geography ==
Lamar is located in southeastern Johnson County in the valley of Cabin Creek. U.S. Route 64 is Lamar's Main Street and leads northwest 5 miles (8 km) to Clarksville, the county seat, and south 4 miles (6 km) to Knoxville. Interstate 40 crosses US 64 2 miles (3 km) south of Lamar at Exit 64 and leads west 64 miles (103 km) to Fort Smith and southeast 19 miles (31 km) to Russellville. Little Rock is 95 miles (153 km) southeast of Lamar via I-40.

According to the United States Census Bureau, Lamar has a total area of 4.7 square miles (12.3 km^{2}), of which 0.02 square miles (0.05 km^{2}), or 0.38%, are water.

== Demographics ==
Historical population
Census	Pop.	Note	%±
1900	474		—
1910	520		9.7%
1920	542		4.2%
1930	449		−17.2%
1940	474		5.6%
1950	555		17.1%
1960	514		−7.4%
1970	589		14.6%
1980	708		20.2%
1990	768		8.5%
2000	1,415		84.2%
2010	1,605		13.4%
2020	1,719		7.1%
2025 (est.)	1,776	▲	3.3%
U.S. Decennial Census

=== 2020 census ===
As of the 2020 census, Lamar had a population of 1,719. The median age was 35.0 years. 27.4% of residents were under the age of 18 and 16.9% of residents were 65 years of age or older. For every 100 females there were 95.8 males, and for every 100 females age 18 and over there were 88.5 males age 18 and over.

There were 664 households in Lamar, of which 33.7% had children under the age of 18 living in them. Of all households, 47.1% were married-couple households, 19.4% were households with a male householder and no spouse or partner present, and 25.0% were households with a female householder and no spouse or partner present. About 24.2% of all households were made up of individuals and 10.6% had someone living alone who was 65 years of age or older.

There were 756 housing units, of which 12.2% were vacant. The homeowner vacancy rate was 0.9% and the rental vacancy rate was 11.7%. 0.0% of residents lived in urban areas, while 100.0% lived in rural areas.

Lamar racial composition
Race	Number	Percentage
White (non-Hispanic)	1,401	81.5%
Black or African American (non-Hispanic)	28	1.63%
Native American	22	1.28%
Asian	9	0.52%
Other/Mixed	91	5.29%
Hispanic or Latino	168	9.77%

=== 2000 census ===
As of the census of 2000, there were 1,415 people, 529 households, and 362 families residing in the city. The population density was 324.9 inhabitants per square mile (125.4/km^{2}). There were 585 housing units at an average density of 134.3 per square mile (51.9/km^{2}). The racial makeup of the city was 95.97% White, 0.14% Black or African American, 1.13% Native American, 0.21% Asian, 0.64% from other races, and 1.91% from two or more races. 3.46% of the population were Hispanic or Latino of any race.

There were 529 households, out of which 35.5% had children under the age of 18 living with them, 51.6% were married couples living together, 12.1% had a female householder with no husband present, and 31.4% were non-families. 28.0% of all households were made up of individuals, and 11.9% had someone living alone who was 65 years of age or older. The average household size was 2.54 and the average family size was 3.05.

In the city, the population was spread out, with 25.8% under the age of 18, 9.6% from 18 to 24, 27.4% from 25 to 44, 21.5% from 45 to 64, and 15.7% who were 65 years of age or older. The median age was 36 years. For every 100 females, there were 92.3 males. For every 100 females age 18 and over, there were 92.0 males.

The median income for a household in the city was $23,317, and the median income for a family was $27,143. Males had a median income of $23,309 versus $16,207 for females. The per capita income for the city was $11,852. About 14.8% of families and 17.7% of the population were below the poverty line, including 18.7% of those under age 18 and 15.2% of those age 65 or over.

== Education ==
Public education for early childhood, elementary and secondary students is primarily provided by the Lamar School District, which includes:

- Lamar Elementary School, serving pre-kindergarten through grade 3.
- Lamar Middle School, serving grades 4 through 7.
- Lamar High School, serving grades 8 through 12.

== Notable people ==
- Carl T. Burgess, speaker of the South Dakota House of Representatives
- Lee Cazort, the youngest ever Speaker of the Arkansas House of Representatives and youngest ever Lieutenant Governor of Arkansas, attended public school in Lamar before moving to Fort Smith.
