= Lake McClure =

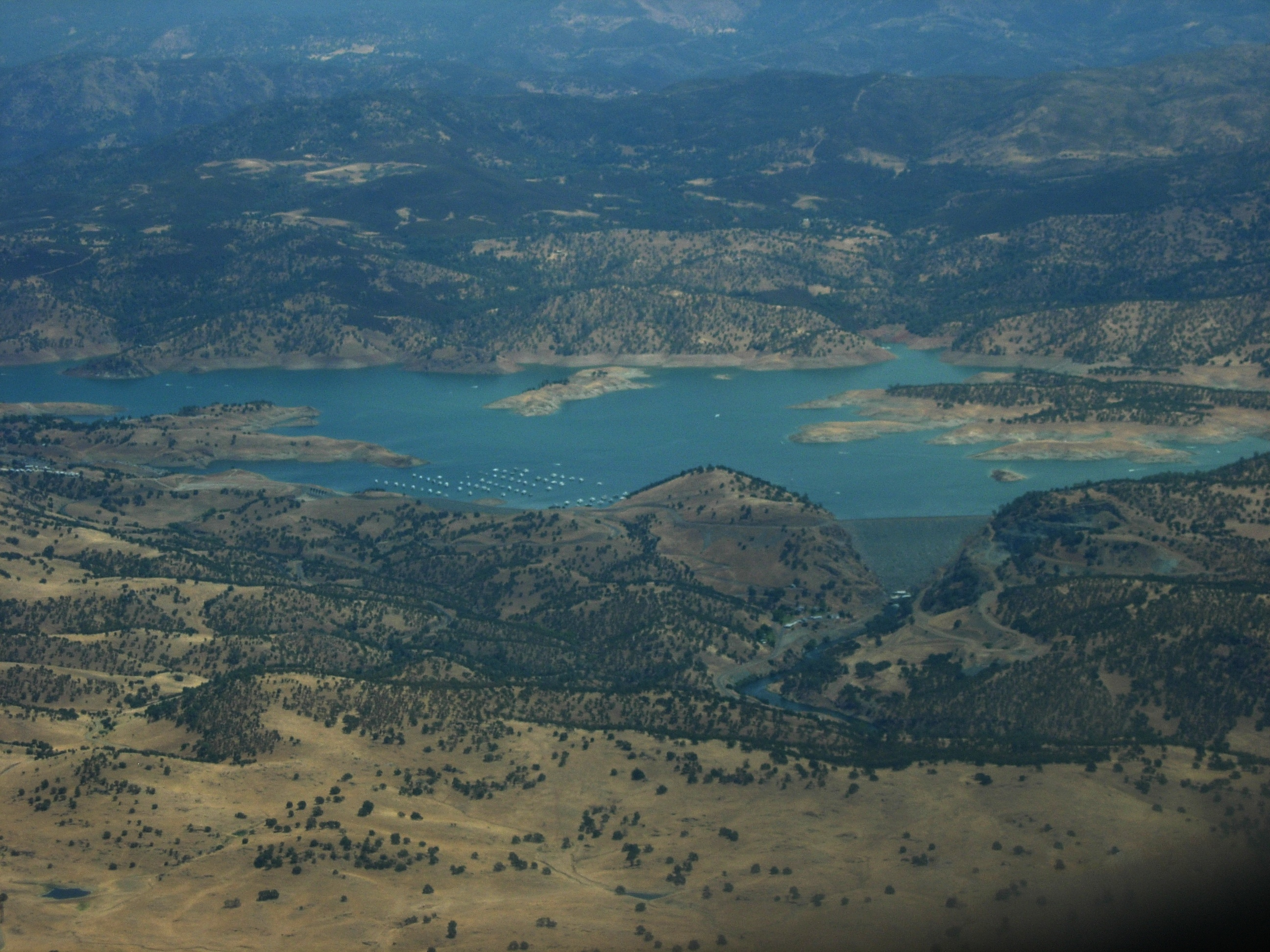

- Location within California Location within the United States
- Location: Mariposa County, California
- Coordinates: 37°38′33″N 120°16′57″W
- Type: Reservoir
- Primary inflows: Merced River
- Primary outflows: Merced River
- Basin countries: United States
- Water volume: 1,032,000 acre⋅ft (1.273×10^{9} m^{3})

Lake McClure is a reservoir in the Sierra Nevada foothills of western Mariposa County, California, United States.

It is formed by the New Exchequer Dam impounding the Merced River, which is a tributary of the San Joaquin River. It is about 40 miles (64 km) east of Modesto.

The California Office of Environmental Health Hazard Assessment (OEHHA) has developed a safe eating advisory for Lake McClure based on levels of mercury found in fish caught from this water body.

== History ==
The lake was first created by the original Exchequer Dam, built between 1924 and 1926, a concrete gravity arch dam. Exchequer Reservoir's original capacity was 281,000 acre⋅ft (347,000,000 m^{3}). In 1926 its name was changed to Lake McClure to honor Wilbur Fiske McClure, Head Engineers of the State of California, who helped develop and lay out the John Muir Trail in the Sierra Mountains of California. McClure and his brother, John Clarendon McClure, also founded the town of Hacienda Heights, California.

== New Exchequer Dam ==
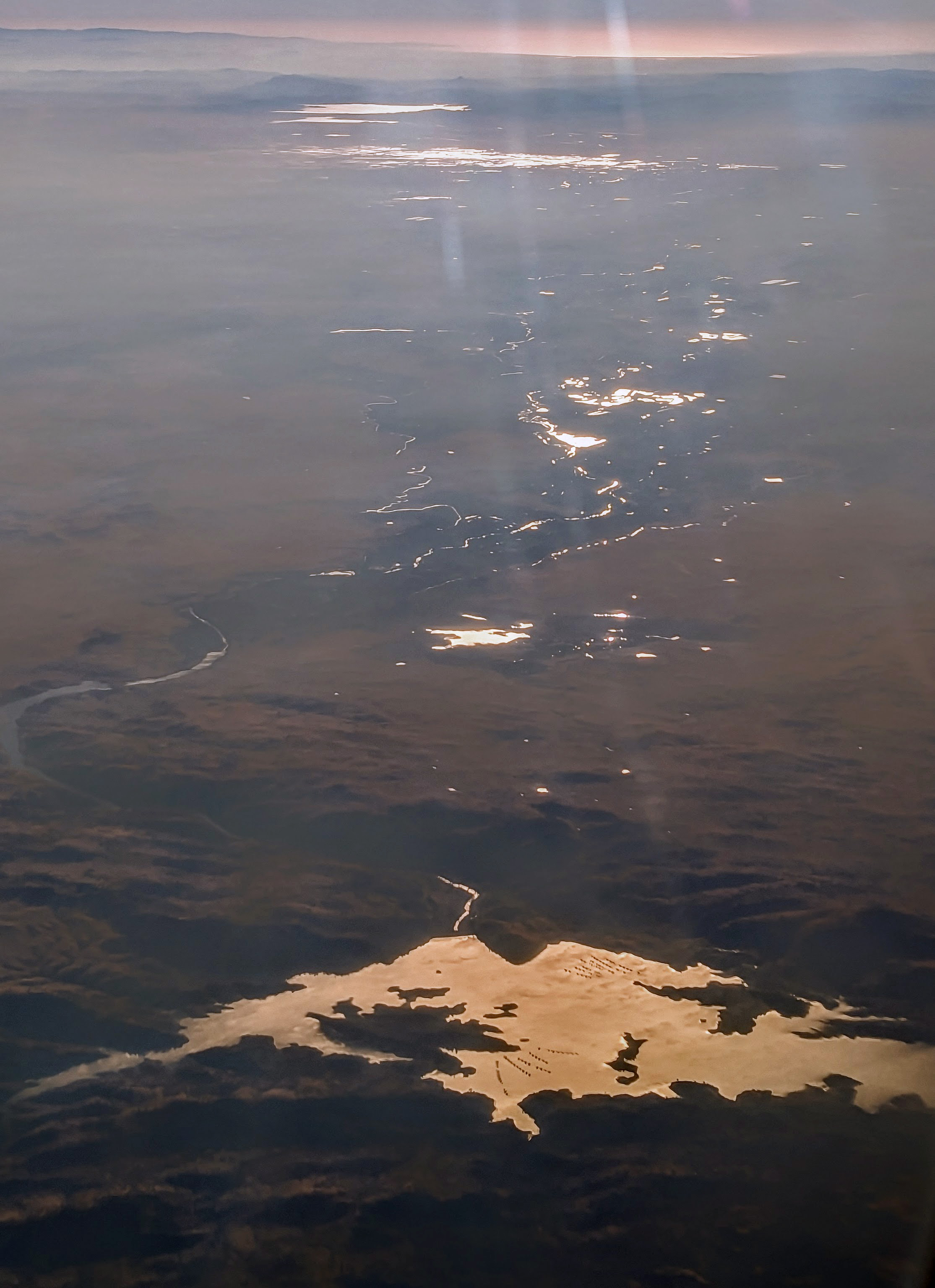
Lake McClure and Merced River aerial, looking into the afternoon sun. The dam is visible at the top of the lake.

New Exchequer Dam was built in 1967 to increase the reservoir's capacity to 1,032,000 acre⋅ft (1.273×10^{9} m^{3}). It is a rock-fill dam with a reinforced concrete face, owned by the local Merced Irrigation District, which supplies northern Merced County farms with water for irrigation through its approximately 800-mile (1200 km) network of canals. At the base of the dam is a hydroelectric plant with a capacity of 94.5 MW.

Besides storing water for irrigation, the lake also provides opportunities for recreation. Only a small amount of water from the lake is used for drinking water, and human contact is allowed. Activities available include boating, water skiing, fishing, and camping. There is a full service marina at the lake as well. Hang gliding is popular at Lake McClure, and the site is reportedly soarable 320 days of the year.

McSwain Dam, about 6 miles (9.7 km) downstream from New Exchequer Dam, was built at the same time and creates Lake McSwain. The lake is a regulating reservoir for releases from Lake McClure. It has a capacity of 9,700 acre-feet (12,000,000 m^{3}), about one percent of the capacity of Lake McClure. There is a hydroelectric plant at the dam with a capacity of 9 MW.

The California Office of Environmental Health Hazard Assessment has issued a safe eating advisory for any fish caught in Lake McSwain due to elevated levels of mercury.

== See also ==
- List of dams and reservoirs in California
- List of largest reservoirs of California
- List of largest reservoirs in the United States
- Horseshoe Bend, California
- Merced River
