= Carl T. Burgess =

American politician

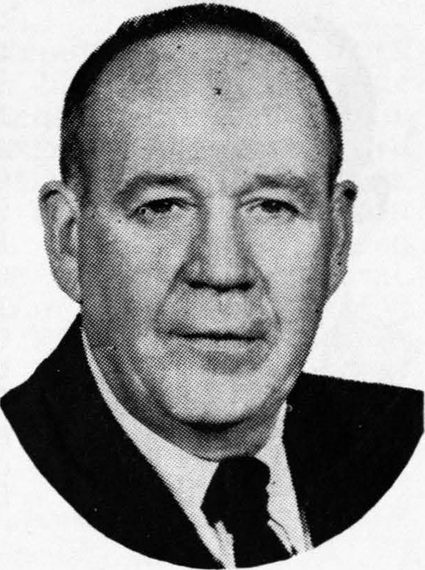
- Burgess in 1965

Member of the South Dakota House of Representatives Pennington County
- In office 1953–1966

Speaker of the South Dakota House of Representatives
- In office 1961–1962
- Preceded by: Archie M. Gubbrud
- Succeeded by: Paul E. Brown

Member of the South Dakota Senate Pennington County
- In office 1967–1968

Personal details
- Born: Carl Truett Burgess; April 22, 1911 Lamar, Arkansas, U.S.
- Died: September 5, 1994 (aged 83) Sun City, Arizona, U.S.
- Party: Republican

Carl Truett Burgess (April 22, 1911 – September 5, 1994) was an American politician. A member of the Republican Party, he served in the South Dakota House of Representatives from 1953 to 1956 and in the South Dakota Senate from 1967 to 1968.

== Life and career ==
Burgess was born in Lamar, Arkansas, the son of Marshall and Alice Burgess. He attended Nebraska State Teachers College, earning his AB degree. After earning his degree, he served in the United States Army during World War II, which after his discharge, he worked as a superintendent.

Burgess served in the South Dakota House of Representatives from 1953 to 1966. After his service in the House, he then served in the South Dakota Senate from 1967 to 1968.

== Death ==
Burgess died on September 5, 1994, at the Royal Oaks Care Center in Sun City, Arizona, at the age of 83.
