= Harmony Presbyterian Church =

Historic church in Arkansas, United States

- U.S. National Register of Historic Places
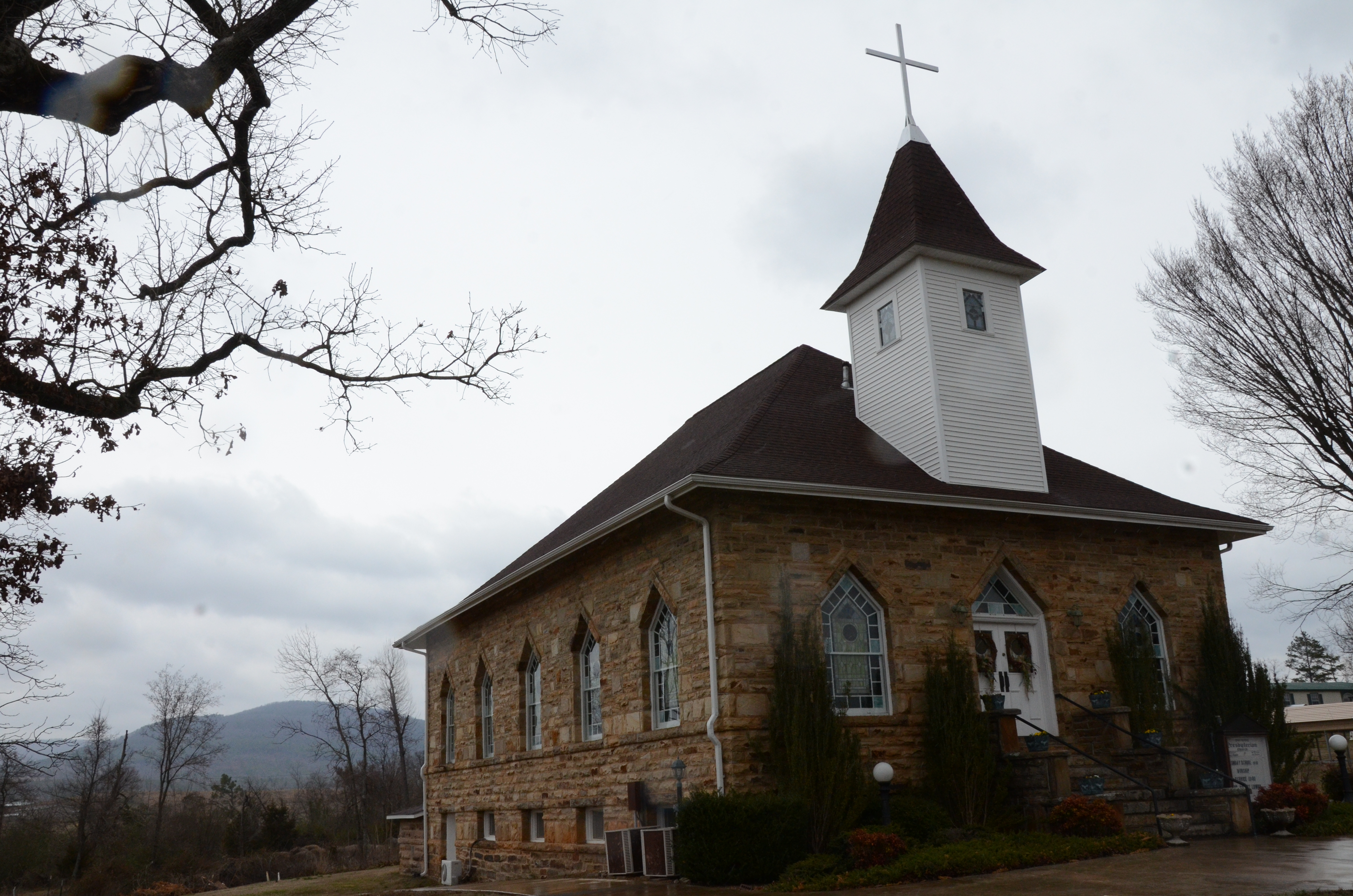

- Location within Arkansas Location within the United States
- Location: Highway 103 at Harmony, Arkansas
- Coordinates: 35°33′2″N 93°34′13″W
- Area: less than one acre
- Built: 1915
- Built by: Tip, Ed, & Joe Chandler
- Architectural style: Late Gothic Revival
- NRHP reference No.: 94001411
- Added to NRHP: December 1, 1994

Harmony Presbyterian Church is a historic church on the north side of Highway 103, approximately 8 miles (13 km) north of Clarksville in Harmony, Arkansas. It is a two-story masonry structure with a stone cut basement, built out of cut stone blocks and covered by a hip roof. A wood-frame square tower rises above the main entrance, topped by a flared pyramidal roof. The main entrance and windows are set in pointed-arch openings, giving the building a Gothic flavor. It was built in 1915-17 for a congregation organized in 1844.

The church was listed on the National Register of Historic Places in 1994.

== See also ==
- National Register of Historic Places listings in Johnson County, Arkansas
