= New Exchequer Dam =

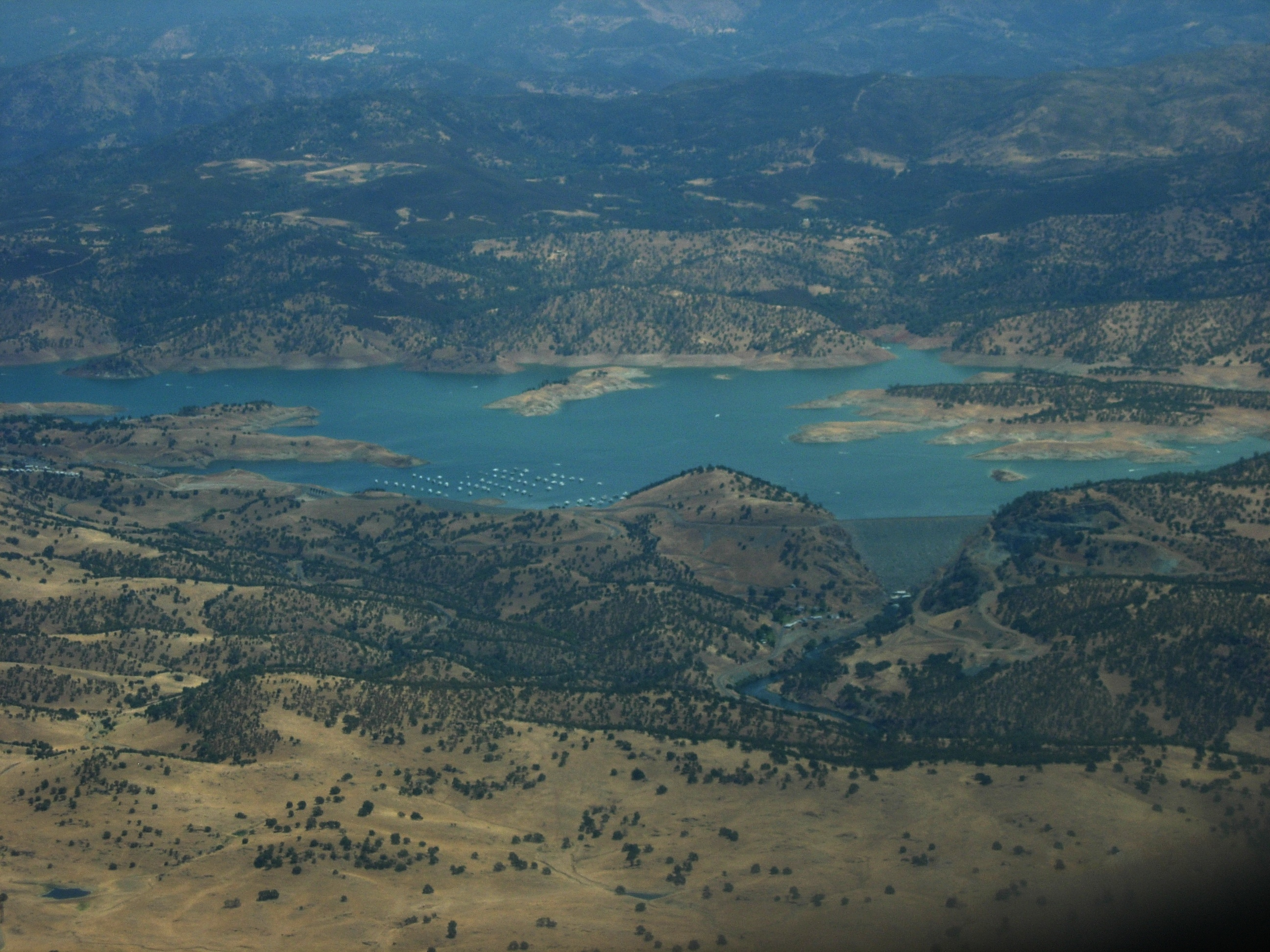
- New Exchequer Dam and Lake McClure viewed from the air
- Interactive map of New Exchequer Dam
- Country: United States
- Location: Mariposa County, California
- Coordinates: 37°35′10″N 120°16′10″W
- Construction began: 1964; 62 years ago
- Opening date: 1967; 59 years ago
- Owner: Merced Irrigation District

Dam and spillways
- Type of dam: Concrete–faced rockfill
- Impounds: Merced River
- Height: 490 ft (150 m)
- Length: 1,220 ft (370 m)
- Elevation at crest: 879 ft (268 m)
- Spillways: Gated ogee crest

Reservoir
- Creates: Lake McClure
- Total capacity: 1,024,600 acre-feet (1.2638 km^{3})
- Catchment area: 1,040.1 mi^{2} (2,694 km^{2})
- Surface area: 7,147 acres (2,892 ha)
- Maximum length: 29 mi (47 km)
- Normal elevation: 867 ft (264 m)

Power Station
- Hydraulic head: 437 ft (133 m)
- Installed capacity: 94.5 MW
- Annual generation: 279,065,000 kWh (2001–2012)

New Exchequer Dam is a concrete–faced, rock-fill dam on the Merced River in central California in the United States. It forms Lake McClure, which impounds the river for irrigation and hydroelectric power production and has a capacity of more than 1,000,000 acre-feet (1.2 km^{3}). The Merced Irrigation District (MID) operates the dam and was also responsible for its construction.

Built between 1964 and 1967, the dam replaced the old arch type Exchequer Dam and stands 490 feet (150 m) high. At the time of completion, it was the largest dam of its kind in the world. The dam is named for the town of Exchequer which now lies under the reservoir, while the reservoir is named for Wilbur F. McClure, the State Engineer of California during construction.

== History ==
In 1926, after five years of planning and construction, MID completed the Exchequer or "Great Exchequer" Dam across the Merced River six miles (9.7 km) above the town of Merced Falls. The dam was a concrete gravity–arch structure 326 feet (99 m) high, holding a 14-mile (23 km) lake with a capacity of 281,000 acre-feet (347,000,000 m^{3}) of water. Although the dam was to serve primarily for irrigation, power production began ceremoniously on June 23, 1926, with a press of a telegraph key by President Calvin Coolidge, starting the turbines at a 31 megawatt hydroelectric plant.

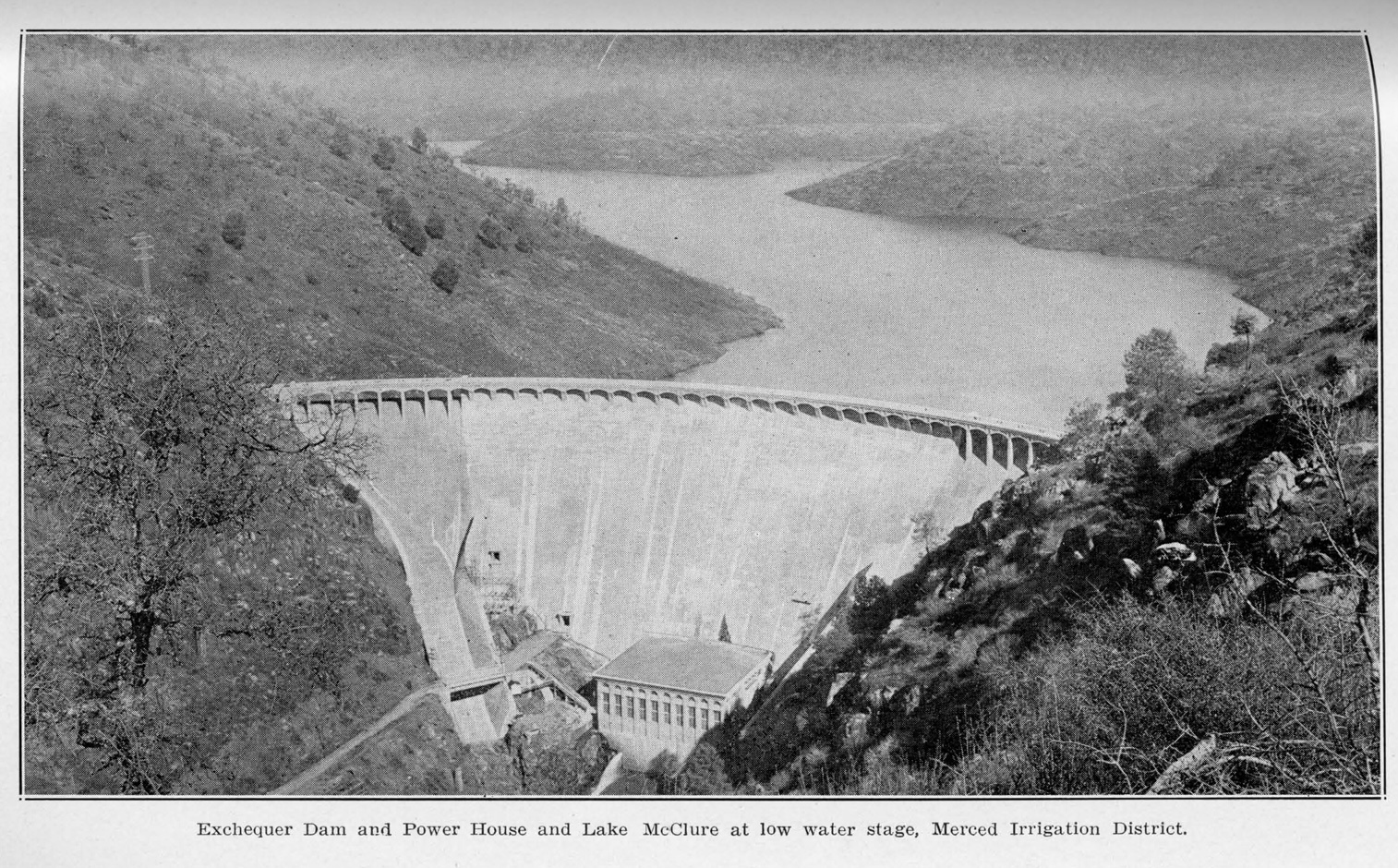
Plate XXII: (Old) Exchequer Dam, photo published 1929

By the 1950s, it became apparent that the limited storage capacity at Exchequer was no longer enough to serve the needs of farmers in the Merced River valley. A high dam was proposed to be built just downstream, creating a reservoir nearly four times the size of Exchequer.

Construction of New Exchequer Dam began on July 8, 1964, directly downstream from the old concrete arch dam. Tudor Engineering Company of San Francisco was responsible for the design of the new dam. The dam wall was constructed in vertical zones, which consisted of compacted, alternating layers of coarse and fine material ranging in thickness from 1.6 to 66 feet (0.49 to 20.12 m). The old Exchequer Dam was incorporated as an upstream toe to help support the rock-fill embankment, which was then armored with a layer of reinforced concrete. The dam was topped out in early 1967 and the power plant went into commercial operation by July.

As the new reservoir filled, it inundated an additional 15 miles (24 km) of the Merced River canyon and buried sections of the historic Yosemite Valley Railroad and the mining town of Bagby under 50 feet (15 m) of water. New Exchequer was among the first high concrete–faced rock-fill dams in the world, and its untested design resulted in significant leakage, sometimes up to 100 cubic feet per second (2.8 m^{3}/s). MID began to repair the leaks in the fall of 1985 under orders from the California Division of Safety of Dams.

The dam has been able to halt major floods in many instances, such as the New Year's Day Flood of 1997. However, it has not always been able to weather the worst droughts – such as in 1977, when the reservoir fell to just 75,000 acre-feet (0.093 km^{3}), a fourteenth of capacity, and in 1991, which saw historic low water levels of 66,100 acre-feet (0.0815 km^{3}). In February 2015, the reservoir reached its lowest level on record, at 63,489 acre-feet (0.078313 km^{3}) or less than 7 percent of total capacity, due to three years of persistent drought.

== Dimensions and usage ==
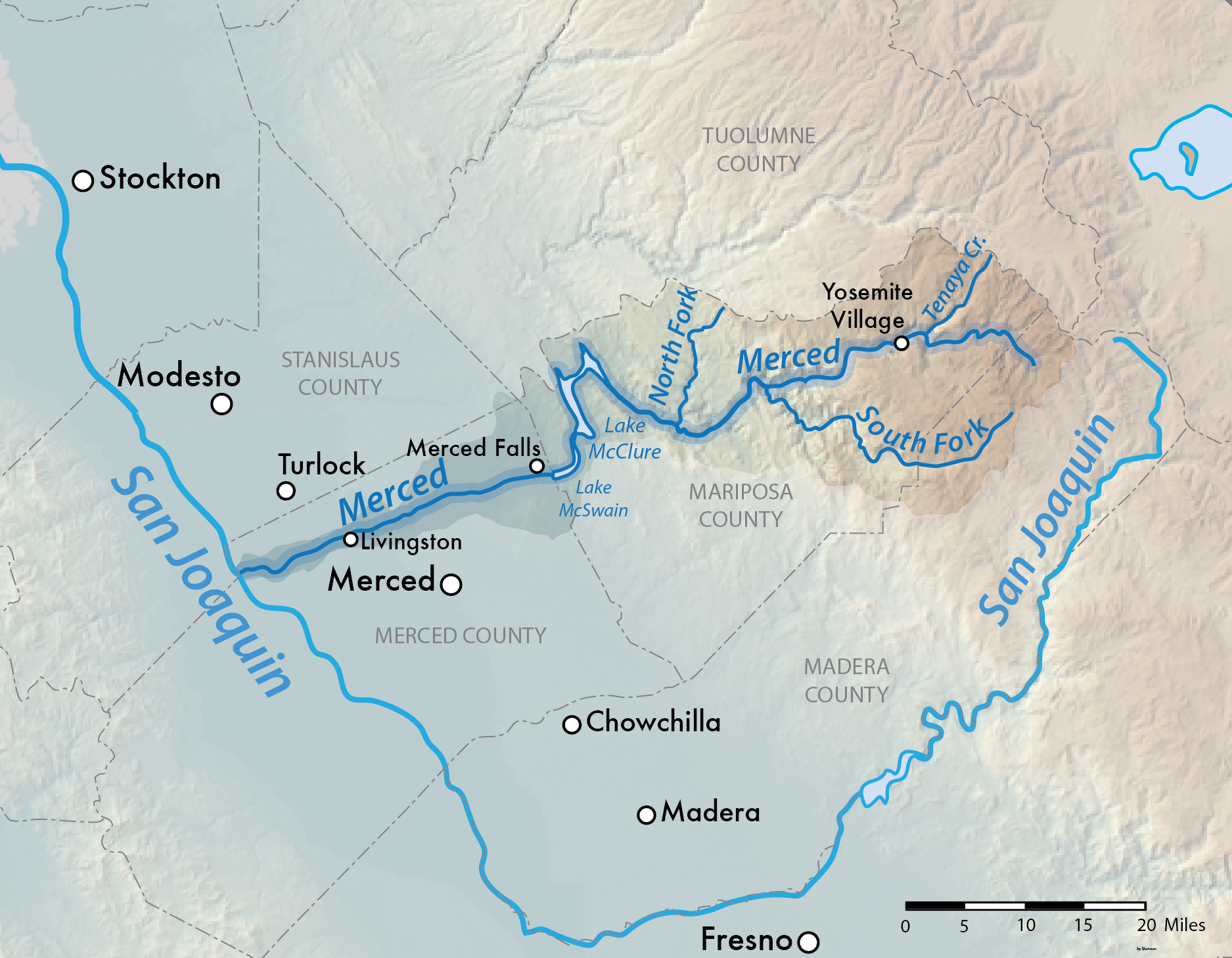
Map of the Merced River watershed, including location of Lake McClure

New Exchequer Dam stands 490 feet (150 m) high from the foundations and 479 feet (146 m) above the Merced River. The dam is 1,220 feet (370 m) long, 18 feet (5.5 m) wide at the crest, 1,000 feet (300 m) wide at the base and is composed of 5,169,000 cubic yards (3,952,000 m^{3}) of fill. High water releases are controlled by an ogee-type, gated overflow spillway located about 2 miles (3.2 km) north of the dam. The dam's power station has a capacity of 94.5 megawatts and generates about 316 million kilowatt hours annually.

The reservoir has a storage capacity of 1,024,600 acre-feet (1.2638 km^{3}), of which 350,000 acre-feet (0.43 km^{3}) is reserved for flood control. At full pool, the reservoir has an elevation of 867 feet (264 m), with 7,147 acres (2,892 ha) of water and 82 miles (132 km) of shoreline. To fulfill downstream flood control requirements, the reservoir will only be allowed to rise into the flood-control pool if the flow downstream at Stevinson is forecast to exceed 6,000 cubic feet per second (170 m^{3}/s).

MID has proposed raising the spillway gates of the dam, which would provide up to 70,000 acre⋅ft (0.086 km^{3}) of additional storage. However, this has met with controversy because it would result in part-time flooding of a portion of the Merced River designated Wild and Scenic. Opponents also point out that the raise is unnecessary, since the reservoir has never overflowed due to flooding since its completion in the mid-1960s.

Lake McClure is also extensively developed for recreational activities, with 515 campsites, four boat ramps and two marinas. In 1992, the lake received 606,000 visitor-days, mostly from May to September.

== See also ==
- List of dams and reservoirs in California
- List of largest reservoirs of California
- List of power stations in California
- List of reservoirs and dams in California
- List of the tallest dams in the United States
- Water in California
