= Hartnoll =

Hartnoll is an English surname. Notable people with the surname include:

- Paul Hartnoll (born 1968), British musician, founder of Orbital
- Phil Hartnoll (born 1965), British musician, founder of Orbital
- Phyllis Hartnoll (1906–1997), British poet, author and editor
- William Hartnoll (1841–1932), Australian politician

== See also ==
- Hartnell
