= Hurricane Grove, Arkansas =

Unincorporated community in Arkansas, US

Coordinates: 34°32′08″N 93°34′40″W

Hurricane Grove is an unincorporated community in Montgomery County, Arkansas, United States.
