= Hartville =

Hartville is the name of some places in the United States of America:

- Hartville, Missouri
- Hartville, Ohio
- Hartville, Wyoming
