= Horseshoe Bay, Isle of Wight =

Bay on the south-east coast of the Isle of Wight near Culver Down

Coordinates: 50°39′56″N 1°05′50″W

Horseshoe Bay
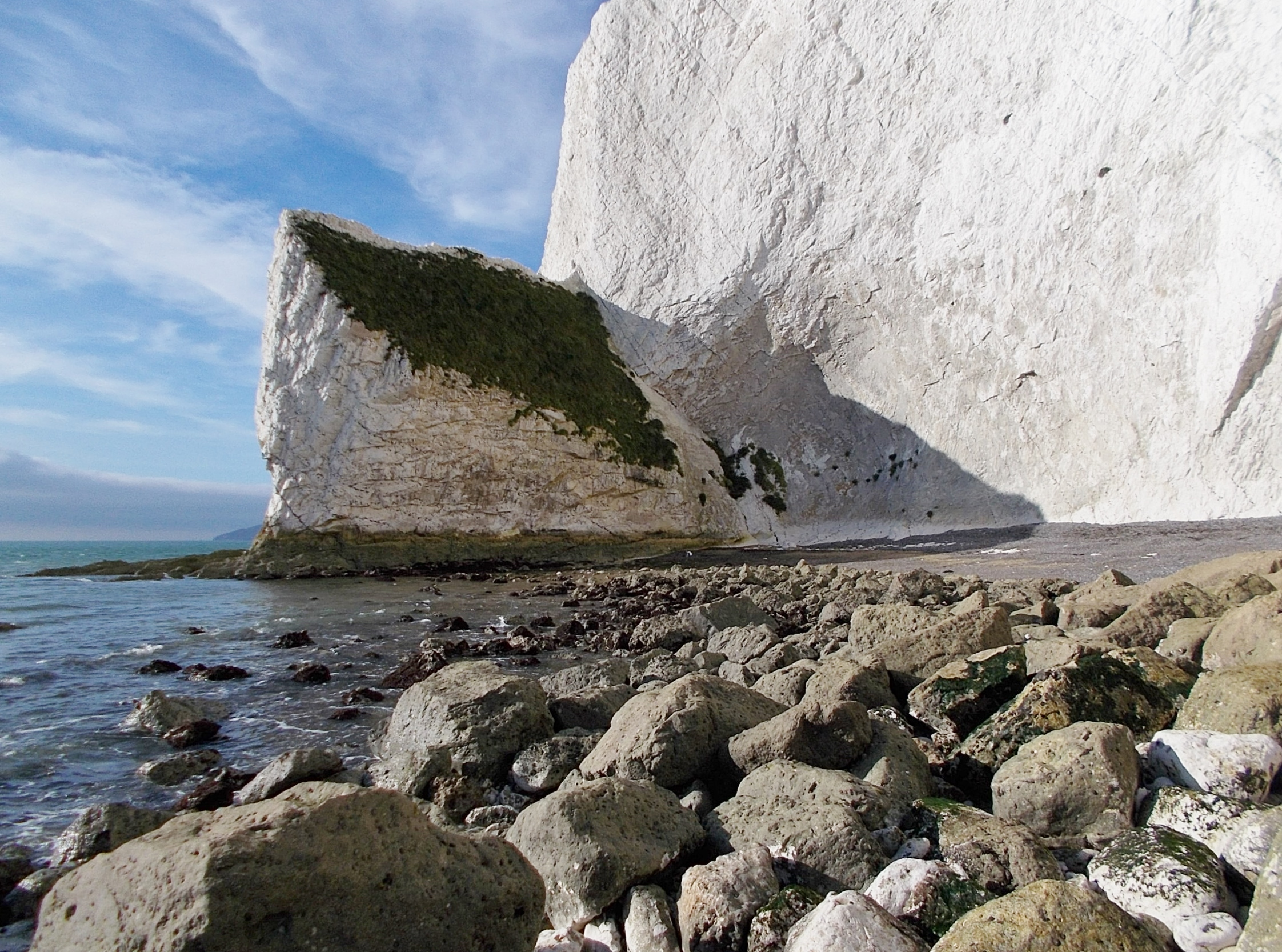
- Horseshoe Bay

- Location within the Isle of Wight
- Civil parish: Sandown
- Ceremonial county: Isle of Wight
- Region: South East
- Country: England
- Sovereign state: United Kingdom

Horseshoe Bay is a small bay on the south-east coast of the Isle of Wight, England. It lies at the east end of the headland of Culver Down. It faces south-east towards the English Channel and its shoreline is approximately 100 yards (90 m) in length. It should not be confused with a similarly named Horseshoe Bay about 8 miles (13 km) southwest at Bonchurch.

The seabed is rocky and the beach comprises a steep bank of flint pebbles. The cliffs are sheer, concave and are made of chalk, which is unstable and persons on the beach are at risk of being injured by falling rocks dislodged by the many seabirds that use the cliff as a breeding ground. Horseshoe Bay lies north-north-east and adjacent to, two caves known as The Nostrils. These can be reached by scrambling over a small rocky outcrop and are partly submerged at high tide.

The beach can only be reached at high tide by boat; but in low tide it can be reached at beach level from the headland from Whitecliff Bay. At a certain time of the year, on very low tides, it is possible to reach Horseshoe Bay from Sandown Bay. Walking to the bay should only be attempted on an ebb, a falling tide. This entails some scrambling and a short traverse even at extreme low tide across the submerged base of the cliff between an old collapsed cave and the nostrils. The coastguard and the lifeboats (rescue) are sometimes called to rescue people trapped by a rising tide, or unable to cope with the terrain.

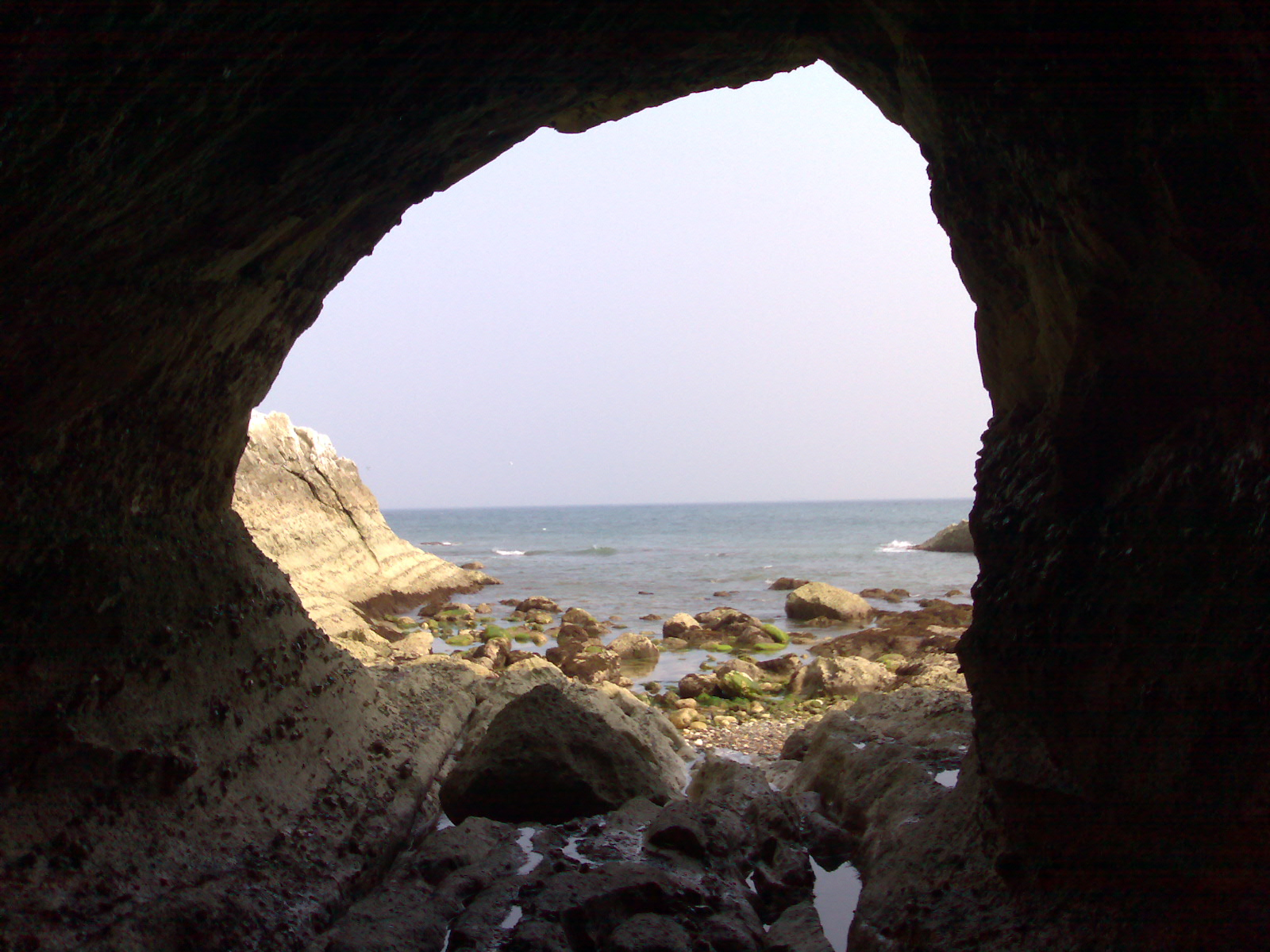
The Nostrils to the SSW of Horseshoe Bay
