= Ozone, Arkansas =

- Census-designated place
- Location within Arkansas Location within the United States
- Coordinates: 35°38′07″N 93°26′42″W
- Country: United States
- State: Arkansas
- County: Johnson
- Elevation: 1,880 ft (570 m)

Population (2020)
  - Total: 92
- Time zone: UTC-6 (Central (CST))
  - Summer (DST): UTC-5 (CDT)
- ZIP code: 72854
- Area code: 479
- GNIS feature ID: 2805673

Ozone is an unincorporated community and census-designated place (CDP) in Johnson County, Arkansas, United States. Ozone is located on Arkansas Highway 21, 11.5 miles (18.5 km) north of Clarksville. It was first listed as a CDP in the 2020 census with a population of 92. Ozone has a post office with ZIP code 72854.

== Demographics ==
Historical population
Census	Pop.	Note	%±
2020	92		—
U.S. Decennial Census; 2020

=== 2020 census ===
Ozone CDP, Arkansas – Demographic Profile (NH = Non-Hispanic) Note: the US Census treats Hispanic/Latino as an ethnic category. This table excludes Latinos from the racial categories and assigns them to a separate category. Hispanics/Latinos may be of any race.
Race / Ethnicity	Pop 2020	% 2020
White alone (NH)	78	84.78%
Black or African American alone (NH)	0	0.00%
Native American or Alaska Native alone (NH)	3	3.26%
Asian alone (NH)	0	0.00%
Pacific Islander alone (NH)	0	0.00%
Some Other Race alone (NH)	0	0.00%
Mixed Race/Multi-Racial (NH)	9	9.78%
Hispanic or Latino (any race)	2	2.17%
Total	92	100.00%

== Notable people ==
- Kenneth Henderson - Republican member of the Arkansas House of Representatives for Pope County; real estate developer in Russellville; former Ozone resident
- C.W. Melson - Republican state representative for Johnson County from 1977 until his death on June 19, 1981, resided in Ozone.
