= Hopewell Township, Arkansas =

Unincorporated community in Arkansas, US

Coordinates: 36°14′10″N 90°24′05″W

Hopewell Township is an unincorporated community and former township in Greene County, Arkansas, United States. It lies at an elevation of 384 feet (117 m).
