= Harmony, Arkansas =

- Unincorporated community
- Location within Arkansas Location within the United States
- Coordinates: 35°32′53″N 93°33′21″W
- Country: United States
- State: Arkansas
- County: Johnson
- Elevation: 627 ft (191 m)
- Time zone: UTC-6 (Central (CST))
  - Summer (DST): UTC-5 (CDT)
- Area code: 479
- GNIS feature ID: 71909

Harmony is an unincorporated community located along Arkansas Highway 103 in Johnson County, Arkansas, United States. It is the location of Harmony Presbyterian Church, which is a historic church listed on the National Register of Historic Places.
