= Tim Hartnell =

Australian journalist and computer programmer

- Born: 1951; Australia
- Died: 1991 (aged 39–40); Australia
- Occupations: journalist, author, programmer
- Known for: computer game books

Tim Hartnell (1951–1991) was an Australian journalist, self-taught programmer and author of books and magazines on computer games. He set up The National ZX80 User Group with Trevor Sharples in 1980 producing a more-or-less monthly magazine entitled Interface. This User Group then expanded to include the ZX81, Acorn Atom and Spectrum computers, and provided a springboard for Tim and Trevor to launch the first of their home computing books. His company, Interface Publications (set up with Elizabeth North), produced titles for all of the machines in the home computer market, including Sinclair machines. Hartnell wrote several compendiums of computer games, which typically had several categories of games, with several games in each category. Each category had tips for writing enjoyable games in that genre. Each game had a description of the program and an explanation of its implementation, sometimes with ideas for modifications; this was followed by the raw code, which the reader had to enter into the computer. Some long games, such as Bannochburn Legacy, had more than 500 lines of code.

To illustrate the style of these compendiums, here is the Table of Contents from Hartnell's Giant Book of Computer Games:

- BOARD GAMES - Chess, Gomoku, Awari, Knightsbridge, Shogun and others
- ADVENTURE GAMES - Stronghold of the Dwarven Lords, The Duke of Dragonfear, The Bannochburn Legacy
- SIMULATIONS - including Mistress of Xenophobia
- DICE GAMES - Chemin de Computer, No Sweat, and three more
- ARTIFICIAL INTELLIGENCE - including Eliza and Electronic Brain
- JUST FOR FUN - Inner Spring, Robot Minefield, and five others
- FUN WITH YOUR PRINTER - Celestia and Billboard
- SPACE GAMES - including Moonlander
- BRAIN GAMES - Fastermind, Switcheroo and several others

Hartnell also wrote several how-to books about various genres of computer games, including Giant Book of Spectrum Games published in 1983, and also edited others, including Pete Shaw's Creating Adventure Games On Your ZX Spectrum, also published in 1983. They were designed so that a beginner could, using his programs as examples, intuitively learn the BASIC programming language. Although he created a wide variety of games, the code for all of them tended to be characterized by an outline-style organization that made it easy to discern the basics of how the program worked. His prose showed a passionate interest in, and enjoyment of, the games he created; he tended to be imaginative, witty, and dramatic, as well as nostalgic - he had little use for graphics, favoring text games that let the programmer's and player's imaginations do the work of creating the setting.

Hartnell returned to Australia in 1984 and died of cancer in 1991, at the age of 40.
