= Hatchie Coon, Arkansas =

- Unincorporated community
- Location within Arkansas Location within the United States
- Coordinates: 35°38′06″N 90°29′31″W
- Country: United States
- State: Arkansas
- County: Poinsett
- Elevation: 220 ft (67 m)
- Time zone: UTC-6 (Central (CST))
  - Summer (DST): UTC-5 (CDT)
- GNIS feature ID: 77143

Hatchie Coon is an unincorporated community in Poinsett County, Arkansas, United States. It was also known as Coon Station.
