= Harwell (surname) =

Harwell is a surname. Notable people with the surname include:

- Beth Harwell (born 1957), American politician
- Corey Harwell, American neuroscientist
- David W. Harwell (1932–2015), American judge
- Ernie Harwell (1918–2010), American sportscaster
- Isiah Harwell (born 2007), American basketball player
- Jack Harwell, American sheriff
- Mason Harwell (1806–1879), American slave trader
- Robert Bryan Harwell (born 1959), American judge
- Steve Harwell (1967–2023), American singer and musician
