= Horseshoe Valley =

Horseshoe Valley may refer to:

- Horseshoe Valley (Antarctica)
- Horseshoe Valley (Peleliu)
- Horseshoe Valley (Missouri)
- Horseshoe Valley (North Dakota)
- Horseshoe Valley (Nebraska)
- Horseshoe Valley, North Dakota
- Horseshoe Valley Resort, formerly Horseshoe Valley Ski Club, in southern Ontario, Canada
