= Horseshoe Bend, California =

Coordinates: 37.6760°N 120.2316°W

Horseshoe Bend is a mining ghost town of the California Gold Rush, formerly on the Merced River in Mariposa County, California, United States.

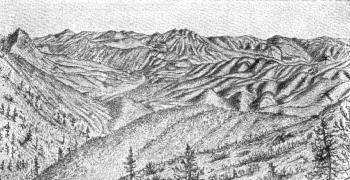
Horseshoe Bend, Merced River by John Muir

== History ==
It was originally a placer and hydraulic gold mining camp in the Sierra Nevada foothills. Horseshoe Bend was approximately three miles southwest of Coultersville; at its peak, this mining camp had 400 residences. Its site is now submerged under the waters of Lake McClure reservoir. Horseshoe Bend was covered in 1926 with the completion of the Exchequer Dam. In honor of the mining camp there is on Lake McClure a Horseshoe Bend campground. John Muir studied the area of Horseshoe Bend and wrote about the Adenostoma fasciculatum plant, a flowering plant, type of chaparral.

== See also ==
- Mining communities of the California Gold Rush
