= Hubbard, Arkansas =

- Unincorporated community
- Hubbard's position in Arkansas. Hubbard, Arkansas (the United States)
- Coordinates: 35°54′19.3″N 94°19′11.8″W
- Country: United States
- State: Arkansas
- County: Washington
- Township: Valley
- Elevation: 1,332 ft (406 m)
- Time zone: UTC-6 (Central (CST))
  - Summer (DST): UTC-5 (CDT)
- ZIP code: 72753
- Area code: 479
- GNIS feature ID: 77247

Hubbard (formerly Hubard) is an unincorporated community in Valley Township, Washington County, Arkansas, United States. It is located near the intersection of Washington County Road 21 and Hubbard Road.

A post office called Hubard was established in 1888, and remained in operation until 1907.
