= Horseshoe Bay, Bonchurch, Isle of Wight =

Bay on the south-east coast of the Isle of Wight near Bonchurch

Coordinates: 50°35′42″N 1°11′24″W

Horseshoe Bay
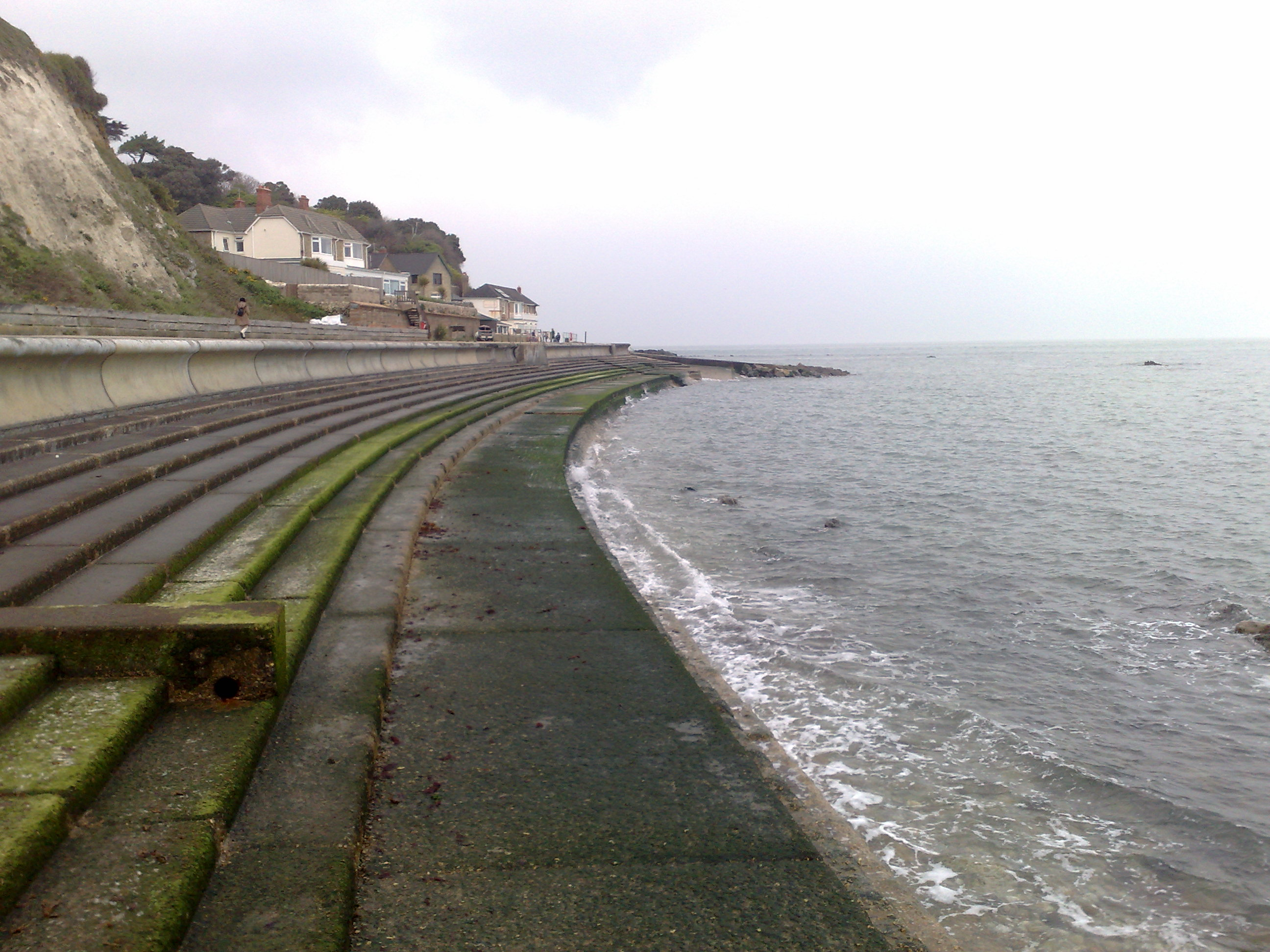
- Horseshoe Bay

- Location within the Isle of Wight
- Civil parish: Ventnor
- Ceremonial county: Isle of Wight
- Region: South East
- Country: England
- Sovereign state: United Kingdom
- UK Parliament: Isle of Wight East

Horseshoe Bay is a bay on the south-east coast of the Isle of Wight, England. It lies to the south-east of the village of Bonchurch. It faces south-east towards the English Channel and its shoreline is approximately 250 yards (230 m) in length. It should not be confused with a similarly named bay about 8 miles (13 km) along the shoreline to the north near Culver Down.

== Seawall ==
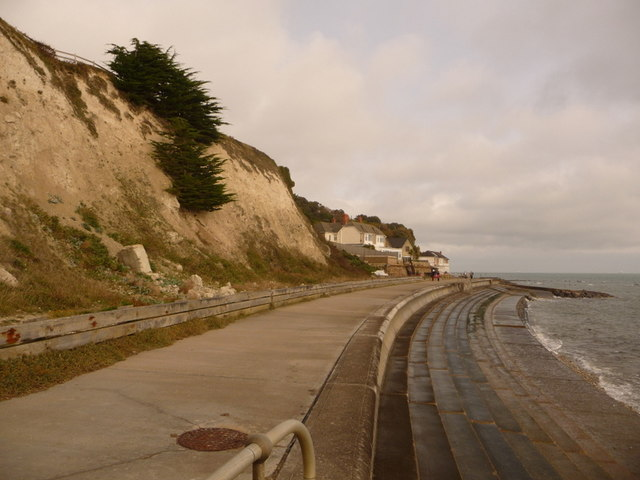
Bonchurch: looking along Horseshoe Bay towards Shore Road

The coast of the bay is lined by a concrete seawall, built in 1988 to protect a promenade and the weak chalky cliff-face from erosion. The seawall comprises a set of steps at the base of the wall, a reinforced concrete berm and stepped apron and finally a curved wave return wall. The wall contains approximately 6,000 cubic metres (7,800 cu yd) of concrete and cost £1.4 million to build. The Isle of Wight Coastal Path runs along the length of this seawall.
