= Horseshoe (symbol) =

Mathematical symbol

Horseshoe (⊃, \supset in TeX) is a symbol used to represent:

- Material conditional in propositional logic
- Superset in set theory

It was used by Whitehead and Russell in Principia Mathematica. In Unicode the symbol is encoded U+2283 ⊃ SUPERSET OF (&sup;, &Superset;, &supset;).

== See also ==
- List of mathematical symbols
- List of logic symbols
- ⊂
- ʊ
- Ω
