= Hartman, Arkansas =

- City
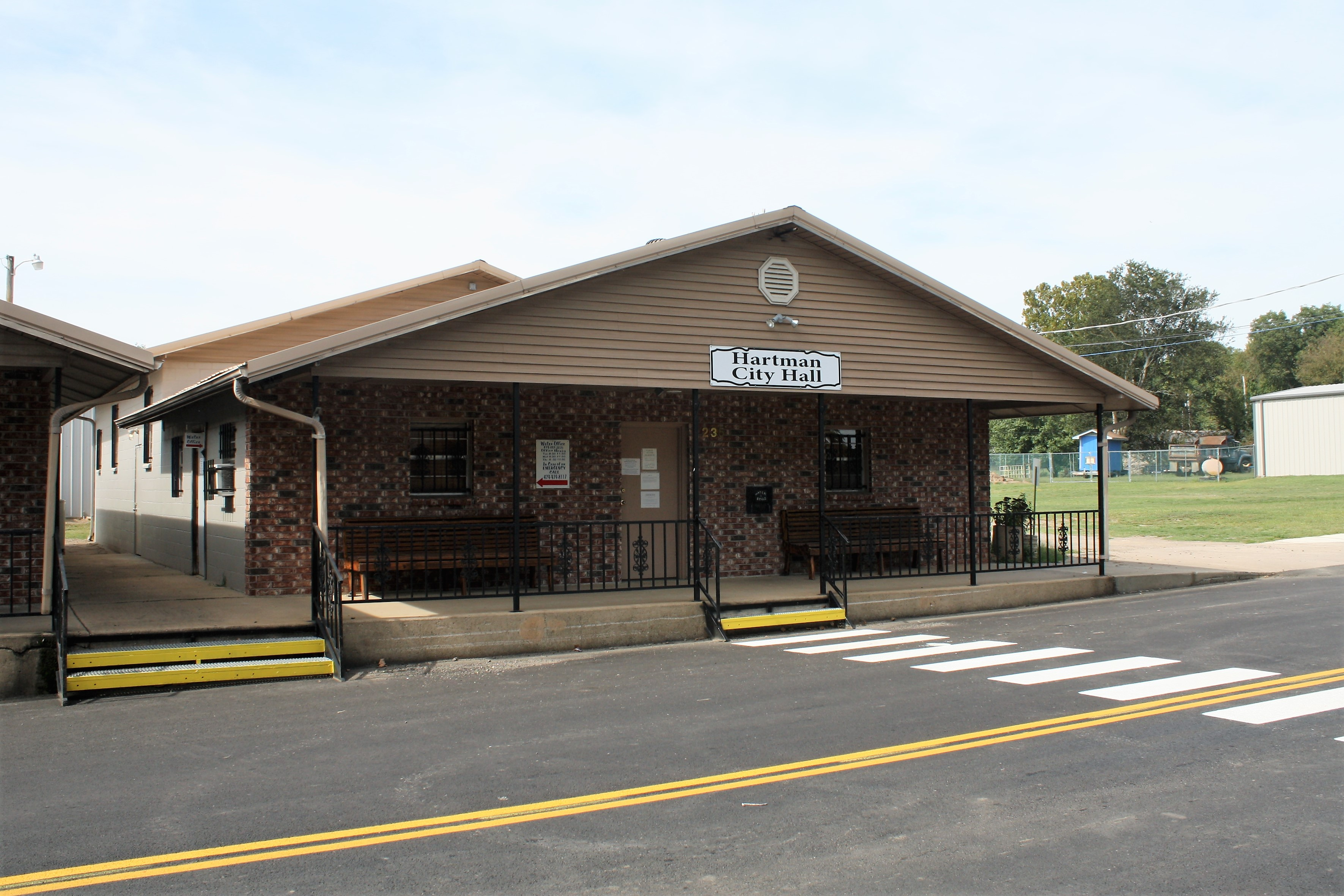
- Hartman City Hall

- Location of Hartman in Johnson County, Arkansas
- Coordinates: 35°26′07″N 93°37′25″W
- Country: United States
- State: Arkansas
- County: Johnson

Area
  - Total: 1.60 sq mi (4.15 km^{2})
  - Land: 1.58 sq mi (4.09 km^{2})
  - Water: 0.023 sq mi (0.06 km^{2})
- Elevation: 492 ft (150 m)

Population (2020)
  - Total: 516
  - Estimate (2025): 518 ▲
  - Density: 326.6/sq mi (126.12/km^{2})
- Time zone: UTC-6 (Central (CST))
  - Summer (DST): UTC-5 (CDT)
- ZIP code: 72840
- Area code: 479
- FIPS code: 05-30520
- GNIS feature ID: 2403811

Hartman is a city in Johnson County, Arkansas, United States. As of the 2020 census, Hartman had a population of 516.

== Geography ==
Hartman is located in southwestern Johnson County on the west side of Horsehead Creek about 4 miles (6 km) north of the Arkansas River. U.S. Highway 64 passes through the center of town, leading east 9 miles (14 km) to Clarksville, the county seat, and west 13 miles (21 km) to Ozark.

According to the United States Census Bureau, Hartman has a total area of 1.2 square miles (3.2 km^{2}), of which 0.015 square miles (0.04 km^{2}), or 1.27%, are water.

== Demographics ==
Historical population
Census	Pop.	Note	%±
1930	542		—
1940	561		3.5%
1950	418		−25.5%
1960	299		−28.5%
1970	400		33.8%
1980	517		29.3%
1990	498		−3.7%
2000	596		19.7%
2010	519		−12.9%
2020	516		−0.6%
2025 (est.)	518	▲	0.4%
U.S. Decennial Census

At the 2000 census, there were 596 people, 234 households and 181 families residing in the city. The population density was 421.2 inhabitants per square mile (162.6/km^{2}). There were 258 housing units at an average density of 182.3 per square mile (70.4/km^{2}). The racial makeup of the city was 98.32% White, 1.01% Native American, 0.50% from other races, and 0.17% from two or more races. 1.68% of the population were Hispanic or Latino of any race.

There were 234 households, of which 30.8% had children under the age of 18 living with them, 62.4% were married couples living together, 10.3% had a female householder with no husband present, and 22.6% were non-families. 21.4% of all households were made up of individuals, and 11.1% had someone living alone who was 65 years of age or older. The average household size was 2.55 and the average family size was 2.92.

Age distribution was 24.3% under the age of 18, 7.6% from 18 to 24, 29.9% from 25 to 44, 22.3% from 45 to 64, and 15.9% who were 65 years of age or older. The median age was 36 years. For every 100 females, there were 98.7 males. For every 100 females age 18 and over, there were 97.8 males.

The median household income was $22,891, and the median family income was $24,821. Males had a median income of $27,500 versus $18,750 for females. The per capita income for the city was $15,188. About 24.2% of families and 25.5% of the population were below the poverty line, including 45.9% of those under age 18 and 26.4% of those age 65 or over.

== Education ==
Westside School District serves Hartman.
