= Horse Shoe Curve, Virginia =

Unincorporated community in Virginia, United States

- Unincorporated community
- Location within Virginia Location within the United States
- Coordinates: 39°07′13″N 77°51′30″W
- Country: United States
- State: Virginia
- County: Clarke
- Elevation: 738 ft (225 m)
- Time zone: UTC-5 (Eastern (EST))
  - Summer (DST): UTC-4 (EDT)
- Area code: 540
- GNIS feature ID: 1802675

Horse Shoe Curve is an unincorporated community in Clarke County, Virginia, United States. The community is located on a horseshoe curve on Route 679 7 miles (11 km) east-southeast of Berryville and has had a tavern since the early 1900s.

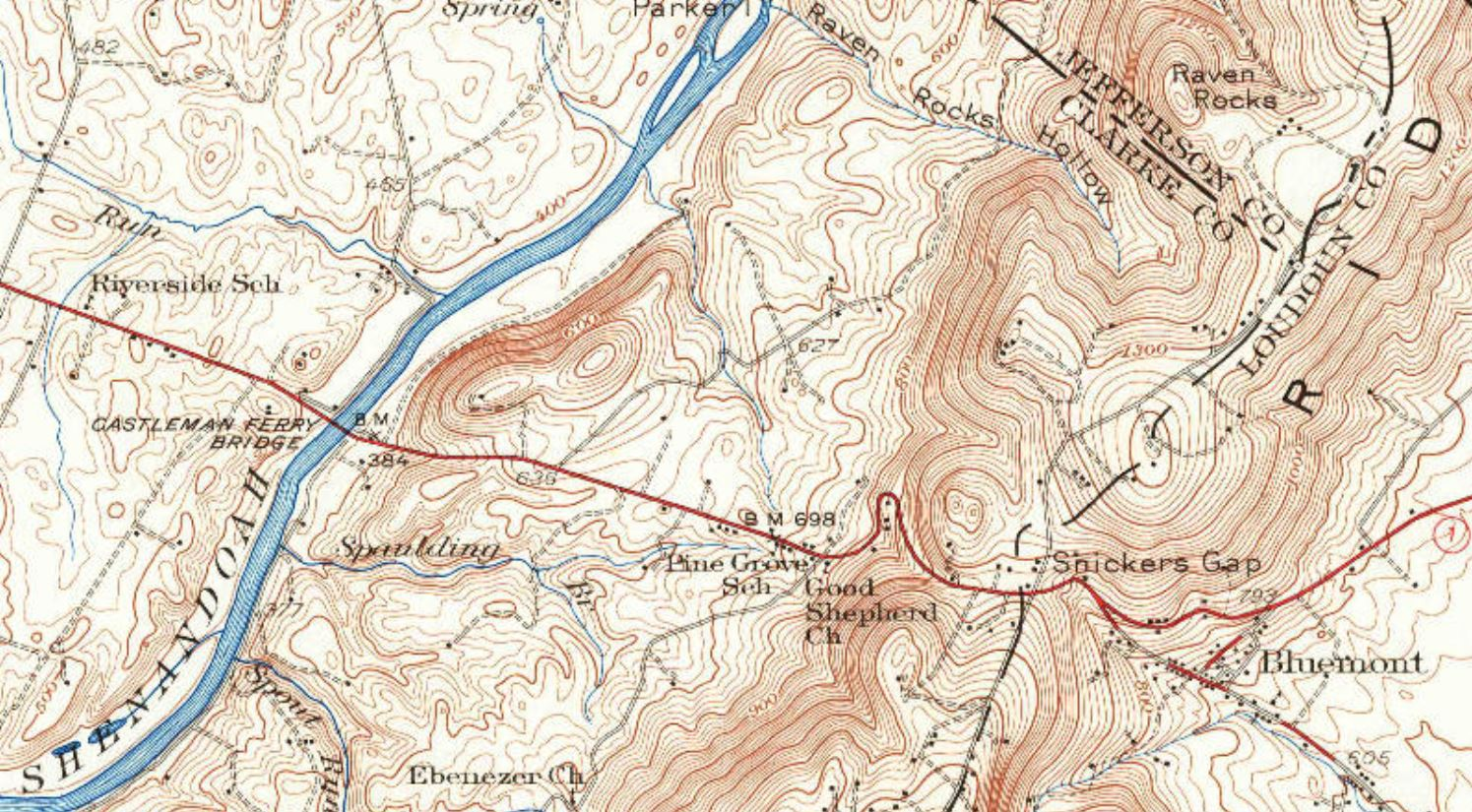
Portion of the 1944 Berryville, Virginia topographic map showing the horseshoe curve in Virginia State Route 7 on the west descent of Blue Ridge Mountain.
