= Hickeytown, Arkansas =

Unincorporated community in Arkansas, US

Hickeytown is an unincorporated community in Johnson County, Arkansas, United States. It is located at 35°24′17″N 93°18′39″W.

Famous residents include Red Hickey, whose paternal grandfather founded the town.
