= Horseshoe, Arkansas =

Unincorporated community in Arkansas, US

Coordinates: 35°30′46″N 91°16′28″W

Horseshoe is an unincorporated community in Jackson County, Arkansas, United States.
