= Knoxville, Arkansas =

- City
- Location of Knoxville in Johnson County, Arkansas.
- Coordinates: 35°22′41″N 93°21′47″W
- Country: United States
- State: Arkansas
- County: Johnson

Government
  - Mayor: John Tyson

Area
  - Total: 3.19 sq mi (8.27 km^{2})
  - Land: 3.19 sq mi (8.25 km^{2})
  - Water: 0.0077 sq mi (0.02 km^{2})
- Elevation: 387 ft (118 m)

Population (2020)
  - Total: 660
  - Estimate (2025): 662 ▲
  - Density: 207.3/sq mi (80.02/km^{2})
- Time zone: UTC-6 (Central (CST))
  - Summer (DST): UTC-5 (CDT)
- ZIP code: 72845
- Area code: 479
- FIPS code: 05-37300
- GNIS feature ID: 2405959

Knoxville is a city in Johnson County, Arkansas, United States. The population was 660 at the 2020 census.

== Geography ==
According to the United States Census Bureau, the city has a total area of 2.2 square miles (5.7 km^{2}), all land.

== Demographics ==
Historical population
Census	Pop.	Note	%±
1970	202		—
1980	264		30.7%
1990	239		−9.5%
2000	511		113.8%
2010	731		43.1%
2020	660		−9.7%
2025 (est.)	662	▲	0.3%
U.S. Decennial Census

As of the census of 2000, there were 511 people, 194 households, and 138 families residing in the city. The population density was 230.3 inhabitants per square mile (88.9/km^{2}). There were 210 housing units at an average density of 94.7 per square mile (36.6/km^{2}). The racial makeup of the city was 95.89% White, 1.57% Native American, 0.20% Asian, 1.37% from other races, and 0.98% from two or more races. 4.11% of the population were Hispanic or Latino of any race.

There were 194 households, out of which 34.5% had children under the age of 18 living with them, 59.8% were married couples living together, 8.8% had a female householder with no husband present, and 28.4% were non-families. 22.2% of all households were made up of individuals, and 10.3% had someone living alone who was 65 years of age or older. The average household size was 2.63 and the average family size was 3.13.

In the city the population was spread out, with 27.8% under the age of 18, 9.0% from 18 to 24, 29.2% from 25 to 44, 20.7% from 45 to 64, and 13.3% who were 65 years of age or older. The median age was 35 years. For every 100 females, there were 110.3 males. For every 100 females age 18 and over, there were 95.2 males.

The median income for a household in the city was $31,250, and the median income for a family was $34,375. Males had a median income of $22,031 versus $22,857 for females. The per capita income for the city was $15,404. About 9.2% of families and 12.6% of the population were below the poverty line, including 13.5% of those under age 18 and 18.3% of those age 65 or over.
