= Johnson County, Arkansas =

County in Arkansas, United States

- County
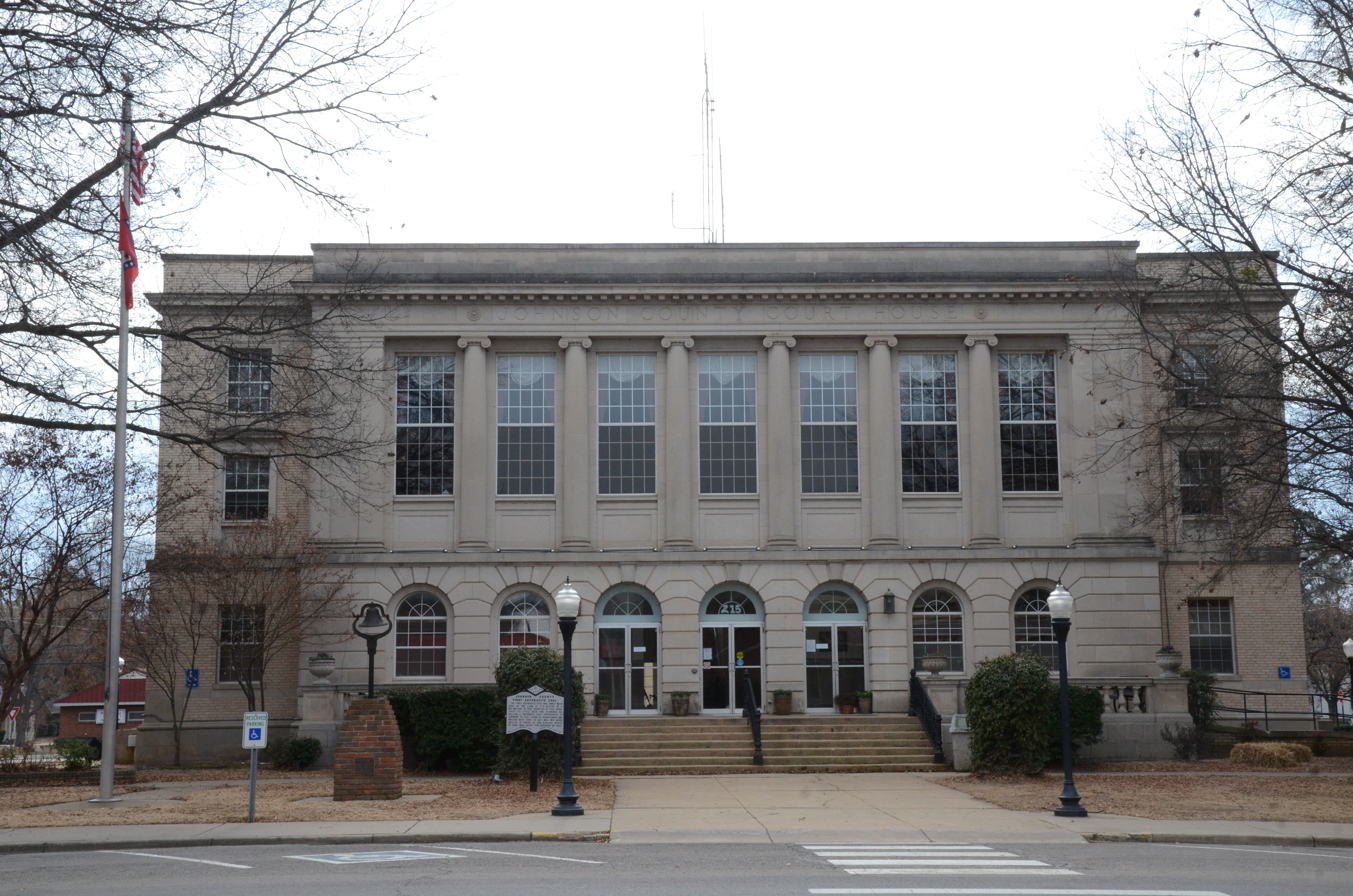
- Courthouse in Clarksville

- Location within the U.S. state of Arkansas
- Coordinates: 35°33′00″N 93°28′00″W
- Country: United States
- State: Arkansas
- Founded: November 16, 1833
- Seat: Clarksville
- Largest city: Clarksville

Area
  - Total: 683 sq mi (1,770 km^{2})
  - Land: 660 sq mi (1,700 km^{2})
  - Water: 23 sq mi (60 km^{2}) 3.4%

Population (2020)
  - Total: 25,749
  - Estimate (2025): 26,225 ▲
  - Density: 39/sq mi (15/km^{2})
- Time zone: UTC−6 (Central)
  - Summer (DST): UTC−5 (CDT)
- Congressional district: 4th
- Website: johnsoncounty.arkansas.gov

Johnson County is a county located in the U.S. state of Arkansas. As of the 2020 census, the population was 25,749. The county seat is Clarksville. Johnson County is Arkansas's 30th county, formed on November 16, 1833, from a portion of Pope County and named for Benjamin Johnson, a Territorial Judge. It is an alcohol prohibition or dry county.

== Geography ==
According to the U.S. Census Bureau, the county has a total area of 683 square miles (1,770 km^{2}), of which 660 square miles (1,700 km^{2}) is land and 23 square miles (60 km^{2}) (3.4%) is water.

=== Major highways ===
- Interstate 40
- U.S. Route 64
- Arkansas Highway 21
- Arkansas Highway 103
- Arkansas Highway 109
- Arkansas Highway 123
- Arkansas Highway 164
- Arkansas Highway 215
- Arkansas Highway 292
- Arkansas Highway 315
- Arkansas Highway 352
- Arkansas Highway 359

=== Adjacent counties ===
- Newton County (north)
- Pope County (east)
- Logan County (south)
- Franklin County (west)
- Madison County (northwest)

=== Protected areas ===
- Lake Dardanelle (part)
- Ozark National Forest (part)
- White Rock Wildlife Management Area (part)

== Demographics ==
Historical population
Census	Pop.	Note	%±
1840	3,433		—
1850	5,227		52.3%
1860	7,612		45.6%
1870	9,152		20.2%
1880	11,565		26.4%
1890	16,758		44.9%
1900	17,448		4.1%
1910	19,698		12.9%
1920	21,062		6.9%
1930	19,289		−8.4%
1940	18,795		−2.6%
1950	16,138		−14.1%
1960	12,421		−23.0%
1970	13,630		9.7%
1980	17,423		27.8%
1990	18,221		4.6%
2000	22,781		25.0%
2010	25,540		12.1%
2020	25,749		0.8%
2025 (est.)	26,225	▲	1.8%
U.S. Decennial Census; 1790–1960 1900–1990; 1990–2000 2010 2020-2021

=== 2020 census ===
As of the 2020 census, the county had a population of 25,749. The median age was 38.7 years. 24.7% of residents were under the age of 18 and 17.3% of residents were 65 years of age or older. For every 100 females there were 98.9 males, and for every 100 females age 18 and over there were 97.4 males age 18 and over.

The racial makeup of the county was 78.0% White, 1.9% Black or African American, 1.1% American Indian and Alaska Native, 3.6% Asian, 0.1% Native Hawaiian and Pacific Islander, 7.6% from some other race, and 7.7% from two or more races. Hispanic or Latino residents of any race comprised 13.4% of the population.

30.4% of residents lived in urban areas, while 69.6% lived in rural areas.

There were 9,902 households in the county, of which 32.3% had children under the age of 18 living in them. Of all households, 48.8% were married-couple households, 19.8% were households with a male householder and no spouse or partner present, and 24.6% were households with a female householder and no spouse or partner present. About 27.5% of all households were made up of individuals and 12.1% had someone living alone who was 65 years of age or older.

There were 11,475 housing units, of which 13.7% were vacant. Among occupied housing units, 70.1% were owner-occupied and 29.9% were renter-occupied. The homeowner vacancy rate was 2.0% and the rental vacancy rate was 10.7%.

=== 2000 census ===
As of the 2000 census, there were 22,781 people, 8,738 households, and 6,238 families residing in the county. The population density was 34 people per square mile (13 people/km^{2}). There were 9,926 housing units at an average density of 15 units per square mile (5.8 units/km^{2}). The racial makeup of the county was 93.69% White, 1.37% Black or African American, 0.62% Native American, 0.25% Asian, 0.01% Pacific Islander, 2.62% from other races, and 1.43% from two or more races. 6.70% of the population were Hispanic or Latino of any race.

There were 8,738 households, out of which 32.40% had children under the age of 18 living with them, 58.10% were married couples living together, 9.50% had a female householder with no husband present, and 28.60% were non-families. 24.60% of all households were made up of individuals, and 11.60% had someone living alone who was 65 years of age or older. The average household size was 2.54 and the average family size was 3.01.

In the county, the population was spread out, with 25.20% under the age of 18, 9.70% from 18 to 24, 27.60% from 25 to 44, 22.70% from 45 to 64, and 14.80% who were 65 years of age or older. The median age was 36 years. For every 100 females there were 99.00 males. For every 100 females age 18 and over, there were 95.40 males.

The median income for a household in the county was $27,910, and the median income for a family was $33,630. Males had a median income of $25,779 versus $19,924 for females. The per capita income for the county was $15,097. About 12.90% of families and 16.40% of the population were below the poverty line, including 19.60% of those under age 18 and 15.30% of those age 65 or over.

=== Racial composition ===
Johnson County racial composition (2020)
Race / ethnicity	Number	Percentage
White	20,084	78.0%
Black or African American	489	1.9%
American Indian and Alaska Native	283	1.1%
Asian	927	3.6%
Native Hawaiian and other Pacific Islander	26	0.1%
Some other race	1,956	7.6%
Two or more races	1,983	7.7%
Hispanic or Latino (of any race)	3,453	13.4%

== Government ==
=== Government ===
The county government is a constitutional body granted specific powers by the Constitution of Arkansas and the Arkansas Code. The quorum court is the legislative branch of the county government and controls all spending and revenue collection. Representatives are called justices of the peace and are elected from county districts every even-numbered year. The number of districts in a county vary from nine to fifteen, and district boundaries are drawn by the county election commission. The Johnson County Quorum Court has eleven members. Presiding over quorum court meetings is the county judge, who serves as the chief operating officer of the county. The county judge is elected at-large and does not vote in quorum court business, although capable of vetoing quorum court decisions.

Johnson County, Arkansas Elected countywide officials
Position	Officeholder	Party
County Judge	Herman H. Houston	Republican
County Clerk	Michelle Frost	Democratic
Circuit Clerk	Monica King	Republican
Sheriff	Tom Hughes	Republican
Treasurer/Collector	Melanie "Fred" Cowell	Republican
Assessor	Rusty Hardgrave	(Unknown)
Coroner	Pam Cogan	Democratic
Surveyor	Jim Higby	(Unknown)

The composition of the Quorum Court following the 2024 elections is 8 Republicans and 3 Democrats. Justices of the Peace (members) of the Quorum Court following the elections are:

- District 1: Mike Jacobs (D)
- District 2: Paula Ober (R)
- District 3: Van Alan Hill (R)
- District 4: Bethany Bean (R)
- District 5: Mike Estes (R)
- District 6: John Payne (D)
- District 7: Kris Muldoon (R)
- District 8: Katie Howard (R)
- District 9: Larry Jones (D)
- District 10: Jeremy Hatchett (R)
- District 11: Bryan Cooper (R)

Additionally, the townships of Johnson County are entitled to elect their own respective constables, as set forth by the Constitution of Arkansas. Constables are largely of historical significance as they were used to keep the peace in rural areas when travel was more difficult. The township constables as of the 2024 elections are:

- Howell: Timothy Harmon (R)
- King: Todd M. Russell (R)
- Pittsburg: Ronnie Butler (R)
- Spadra: Jonathan Howard (R)

=== Politics ===
Over the past few election cycles, Johnson County has trended heavily toward the GOP. The last Democratic presidential candidate to carry this county was Arkansas native Bill Clinton in 1992 and 1996.

United States presidential election results for Johnson County, Arkansas
Year	Republican		Democratic		Third party(ies)	
Year	No.	%	No.	%	No.	%
1896	491	21.06%	1,831	78.55%	9	0.39%
1900	552	29.30%	1,317	69.90%	15	0.80%
1904	507	31.30%	1,047	64.63%	66	4.07%
1908	544	29.14%	1,164	62.35%	159	8.52%
1912	189	12.57%	927	61.64%	388	25.80%
1916	571	27.85%	1,479	72.15%	0	0.00%
1920	996	36.15%	1,579	57.31%	180	6.53%
1924	311	19.78%	1,029	65.46%	232	14.76%
1928	766	36.93%	1,292	62.30%	16	0.77%
1932	284	14.88%	1,557	81.60%	67	3.51%
1936	318	17.95%	1,432	80.81%	22	1.24%
1940	318	18.11%	1,429	81.38%	9	0.51%
1944	593	31.03%	1,311	68.60%	7	0.37%
1948	523	23.25%	1,565	69.59%	161	7.16%
1952	1,728	45.90%	2,021	53.68%	16	0.42%
1956	1,520	46.84%	1,697	52.30%	28	0.86%
1960	1,490	42.29%	1,938	55.01%	95	2.70%
1964	1,535	32.78%	3,127	66.77%	21	0.45%
1968	1,667	32.64%	1,747	34.21%	1,693	33.15%
1972	4,107	66.76%	2,045	33.24%	0	0.00%
1976	2,173	30.11%	5,044	69.89%	0	0.00%
1980	3,619	47.39%	3,709	48.57%	308	4.03%
1984	4,720	60.30%	3,056	39.04%	51	0.65%
1988	4,046	58.29%	2,818	40.60%	77	1.11%
1992	2,563	33.82%	3,951	52.14%	1,064	14.04%
1996	2,367	34.64%	3,585	52.47%	881	12.89%
2000	3,657	51.07%	3,270	45.66%	234	3.27%
2004	4,311	53.59%	3,622	45.03%	111	1.38%
2008	4,922	60.17%	3,034	37.09%	224	2.74%
2012	5,064	62.53%	2,799	34.56%	235	2.90%
2016	6,091	66.85%	2,427	26.64%	594	6.52%
2020	6,938	73.05%	2,283	24.04%	277	2.92%
2024	6,766	74.69%	2,107	23.26%	186	2.05%

=== Cities ===
- Clarksville (county seat)
- Coal Hill
- Hartman
- Knoxville
- Lamar

=== Census-designated places ===
- Hagarville
- Oark
- Ozone

=== Other unincorporated communities ===
- Gillian Settlement
- Harmony
- Hickeytown
- Pittsburg

=== Townships ===
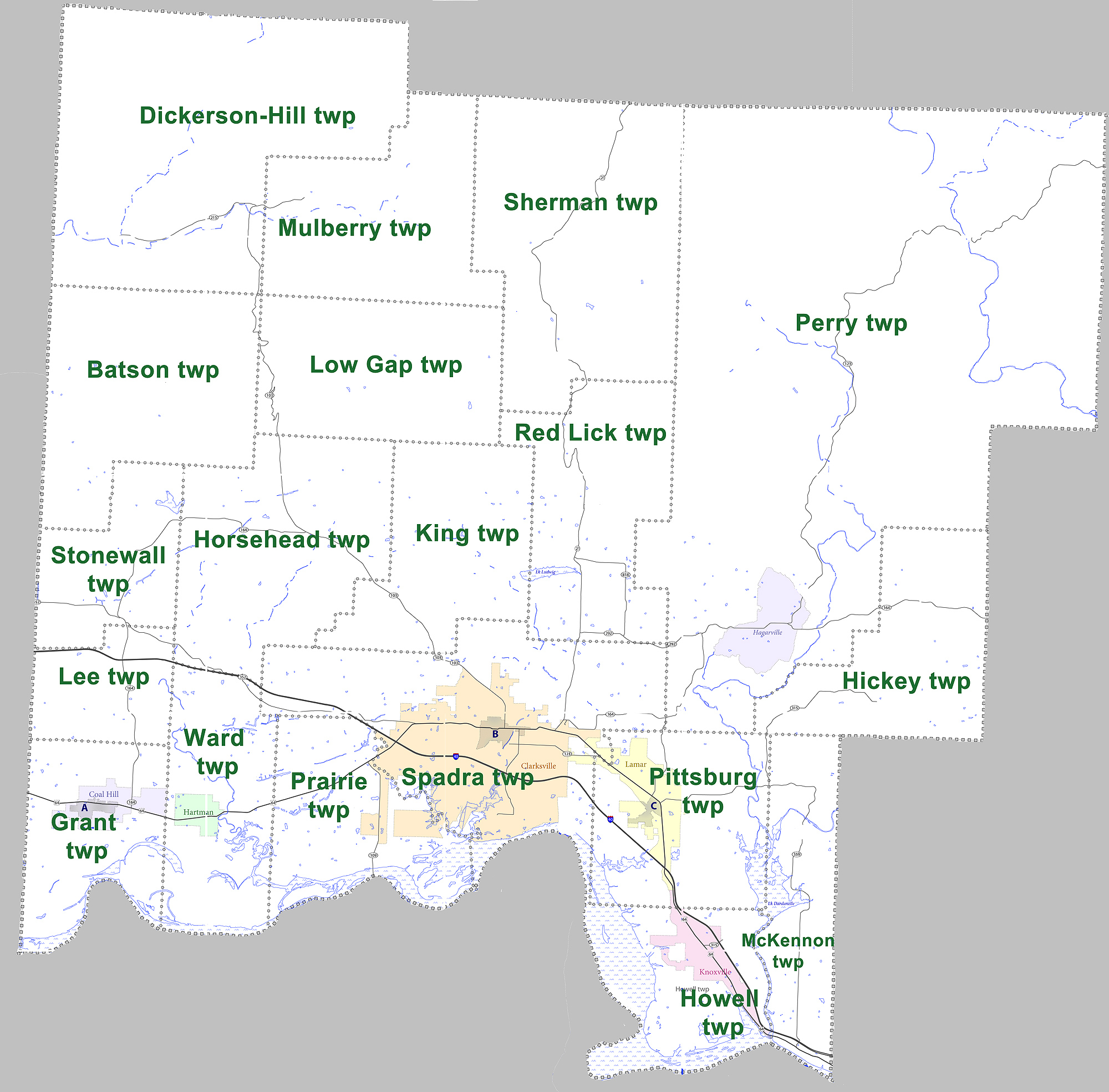
Townships in Johnson County, Arkansas as of 2010

Townships in Arkansas are the divisions of a county. Each township includes unincorporated areas; some may have incorporated cities or towns within part of their boundaries. Arkansas townships have limited purposes in modern times. However, the United States census does list Arkansas population based on townships (sometimes referred to as "county subdivisions" or "minor civil divisions"). Townships are also of value for historical purposes in terms of genealogical research. Each town or city is within one or more townships in an Arkansas county based on census maps and publications. The townships of Johnson County are listed below; listed in parentheses are the cities, towns, and/or census-designated places that are fully or partially inside the township.

- Batson
- Dickerson-Hill
- Grant (Coal Hill)
- Hickey
- Horsehead
- Howell (most of Knoxville)
- Lee
- Low Gap
- McKennon
- Mulberry
- Perry (CDP Hagarville)
- Pittsburg (most of Lamar, small part of Knoxville)
- Prairie (small part of Clarksville)
- Red Lick
- Sherman
- Spadra (most of Clarksville, small part of Lamar)
- Stonewall
- Ward (Hartman)

== See also ==
- List of lakes in Johnson County, Arkansas
- National Register of Historic Places listings in Johnson County, Arkansas
