= Gale Peak =

Mountain in the American state of California

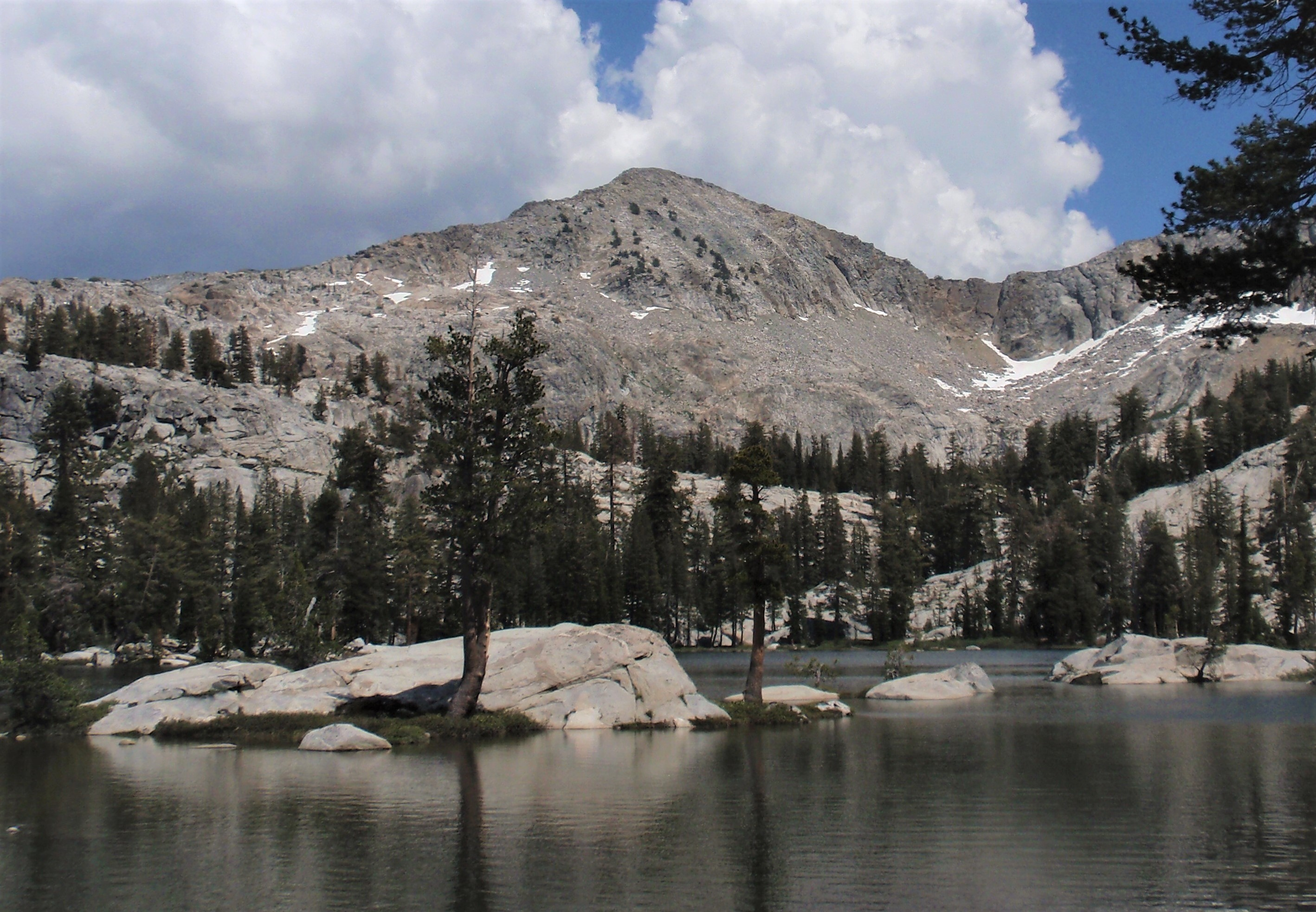
- West aspect, above Chain Lakes

Highest point
- Elevation: 10,690 ft (3,258 m)
- Prominence: 600 ft (183 m)
- Isolation: 3.73 mi (6.00 km)
- Coordinates: 37°34′05″N 119°23′13″W

Naming
- Etymology: George H. G. Gale

Geography
- Location within California Location within the United States
- Location: Yosemite National Park; Madera County, California, U.S.
- Parent range: Sierra Nevada
- Topo map: USGS Sing Peak

Geology
- Rock age: Cretaceous
- Mountain type: Fault block
- Rock type: Granodiorite

Climbing
- First ascent: 1920
- Easiest route: class 2

Gale Peak is a 10,690-foot-elevation (3,260-meter) mountain summit located in Madera County, California, United States. It is situated in the Sierra Nevada mountain range, in the southeast corner of Yosemite National Park, on the common boundary which the park shares with the Ansel Adams Wilderness. The mountain rises 1.3 miles (2.1 km) south of Fernandez Pass, 4.5 miles (7.2 km) south of the Clark Range, and 2.2 miles (3.5 km) north-northwest of Madera Peak. Precipitation runoff from this landform drains west into tributaries of the South Fork Merced River, and east into tributaries of the San Joaquin River. Topographic relief is significant as the summit rises 1,400 feet (430 meters) above Upper Chain Lake in 0.38 miles (0.61 km). The peak can be climbed via the class 2 northwest ridge which separates Breeze Lake from the Chain Lakes.

== History ==
This geographical feature was named in 1894 by Lieutenant Nathaniel Fish McClure who prepared a map of Yosemite National Park for use by Army troops. The toponym honors Captain George Henry Goodwin Gale, 4th Cavalry US Army, and the acting military superintendent of Yosemite Park in 1894. The US Army had jurisdiction over Yosemite National Park from 1891 to 1914, and each summer 150 cavalrymen traveled from the Presidio of San Francisco to patrol the park. This geographical feature's toponym was officially adopted in 1932 by the U.S. Board on Geographic Names.

The first ascent of the summit was made in 1920 by Lawrence Fley, Freeman Jones, and Thomas Jones.

== Climate ==
According to the Köppen climate classification system, Gale Peak is located in an alpine climate zone. Most weather fronts originate in the Pacific Ocean and travel east toward the Sierra Nevada mountains. As fronts approach, they are forced upward by the peaks (orographic lift), causing them to drop their moisture in the form of rain or snowfall onto the range.

== Gallery ==
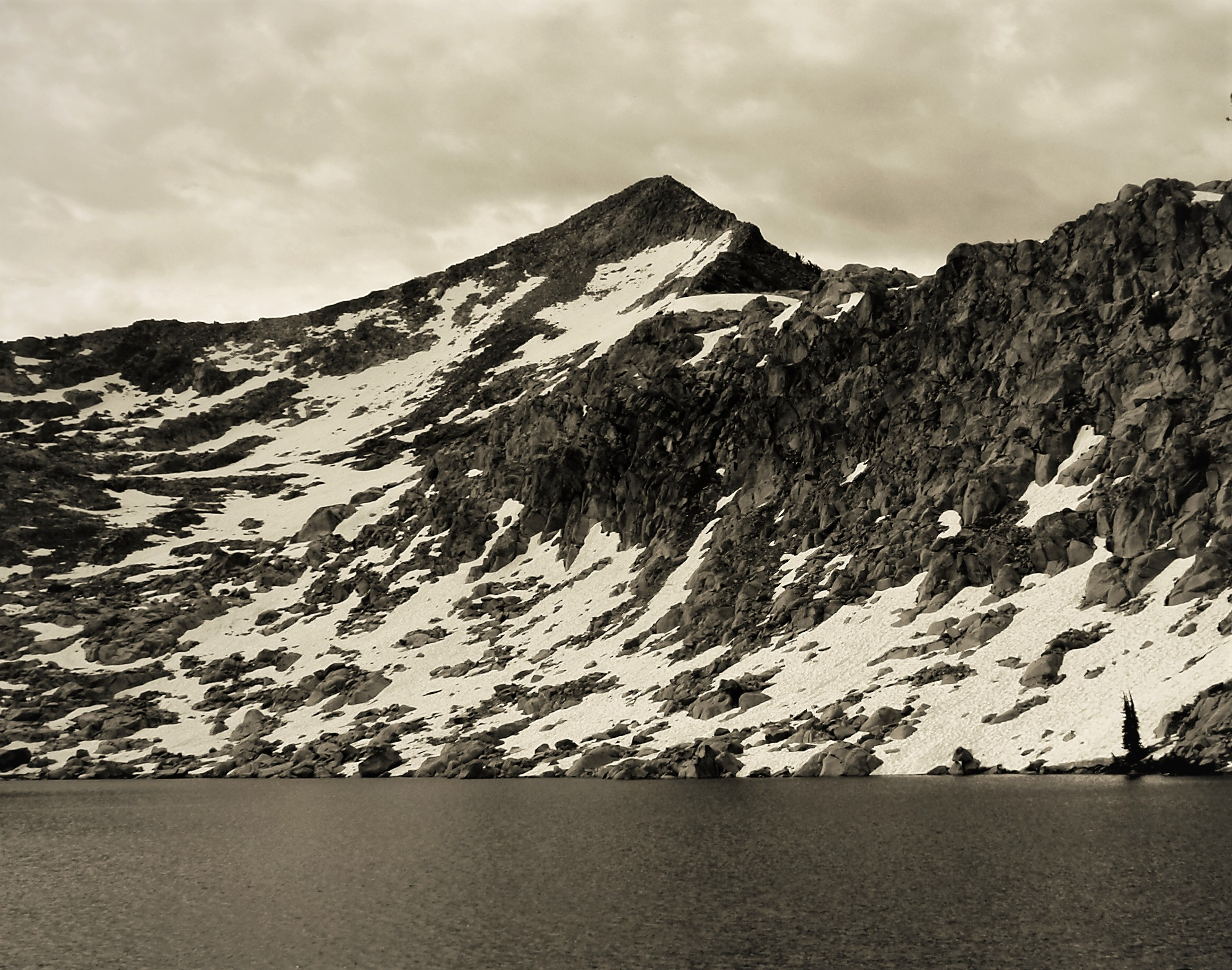
North aspect of Gale Peak from Breeze Lake

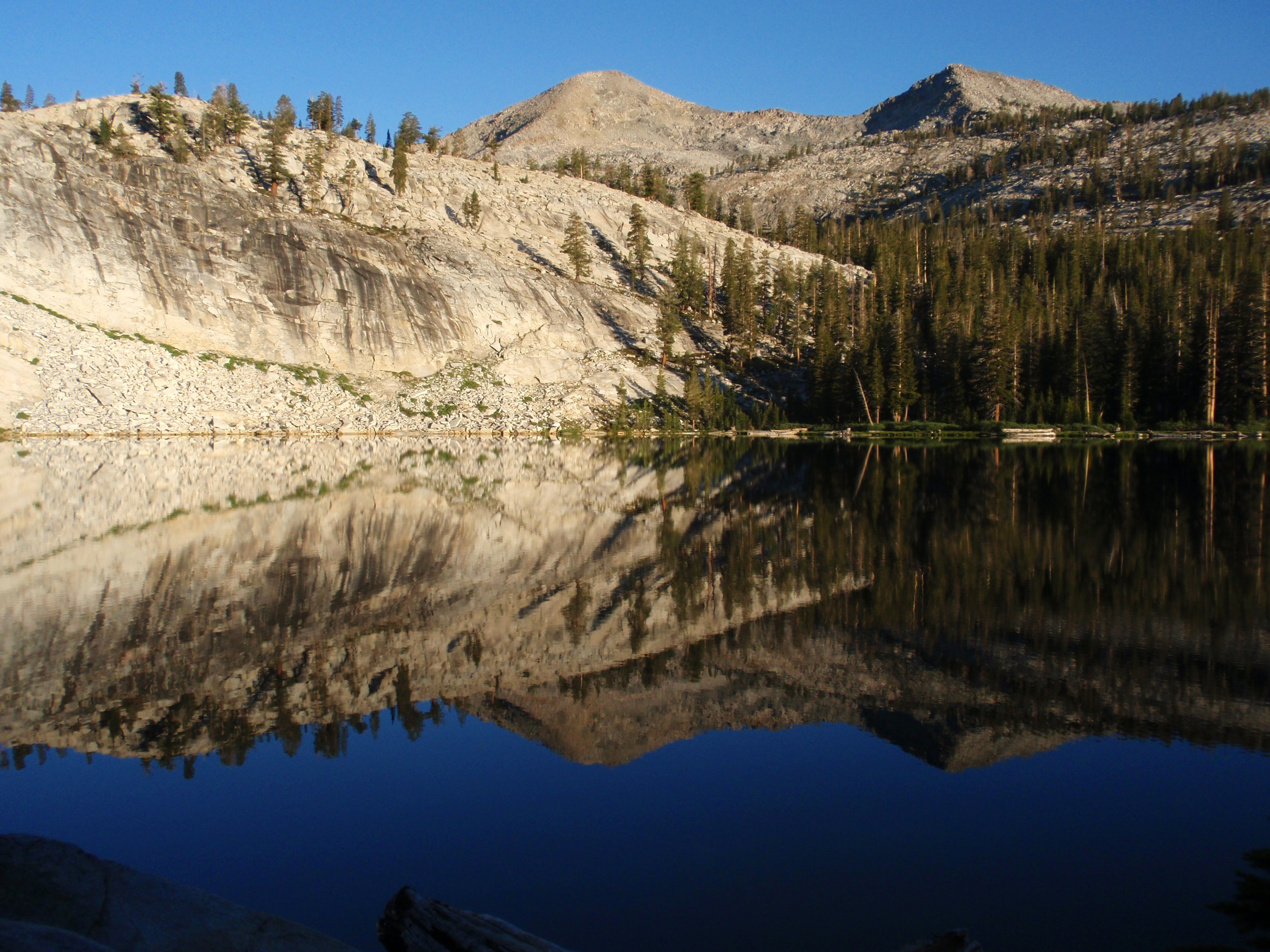
East aspect of Gale Peak seen from Lillian Lake

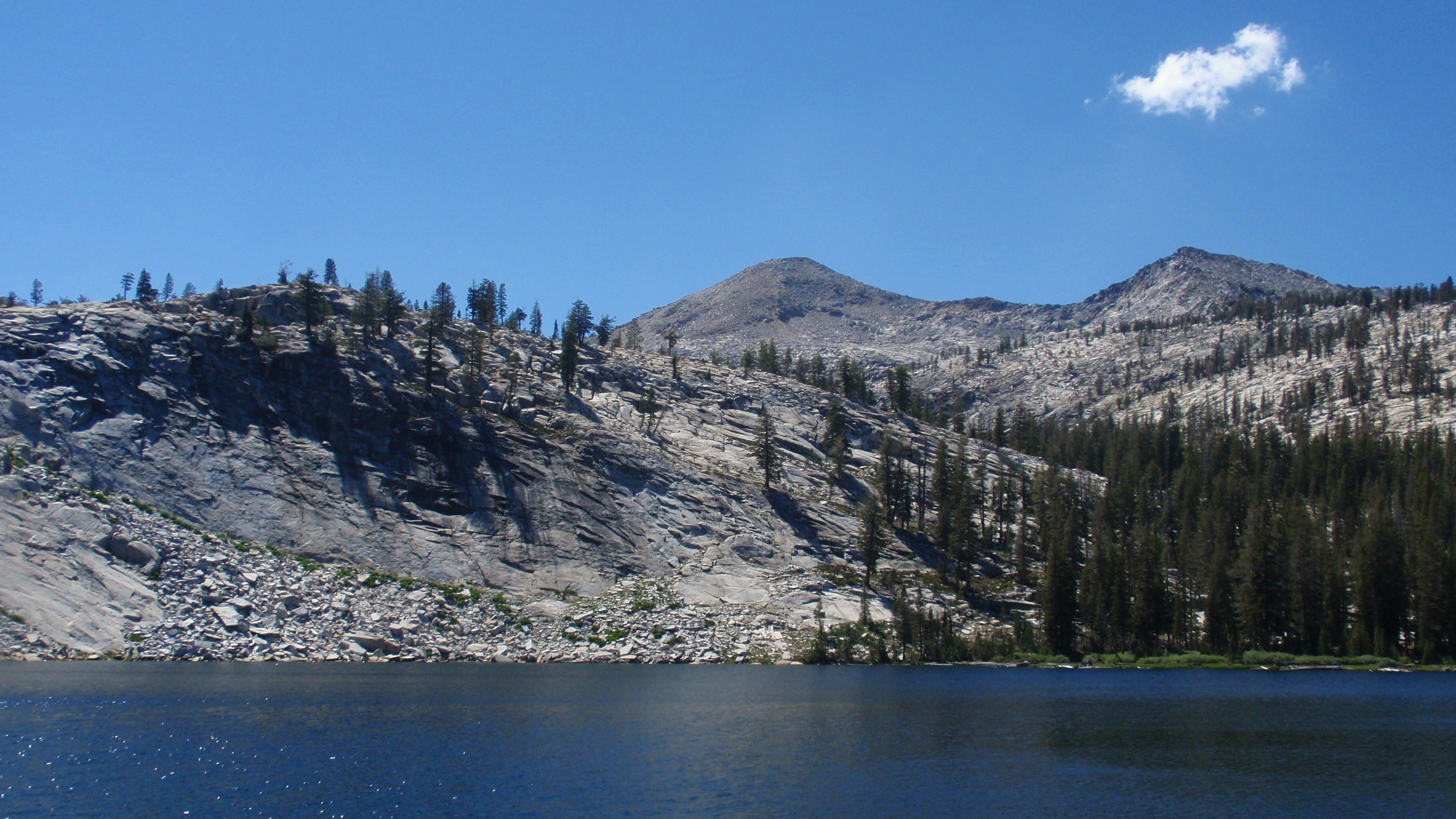
East aspect of Gale Peak from Lillian Lake

== See also ==
- Geology of the Yosemite area
