= Madera Peak =

Mountain the American state of California

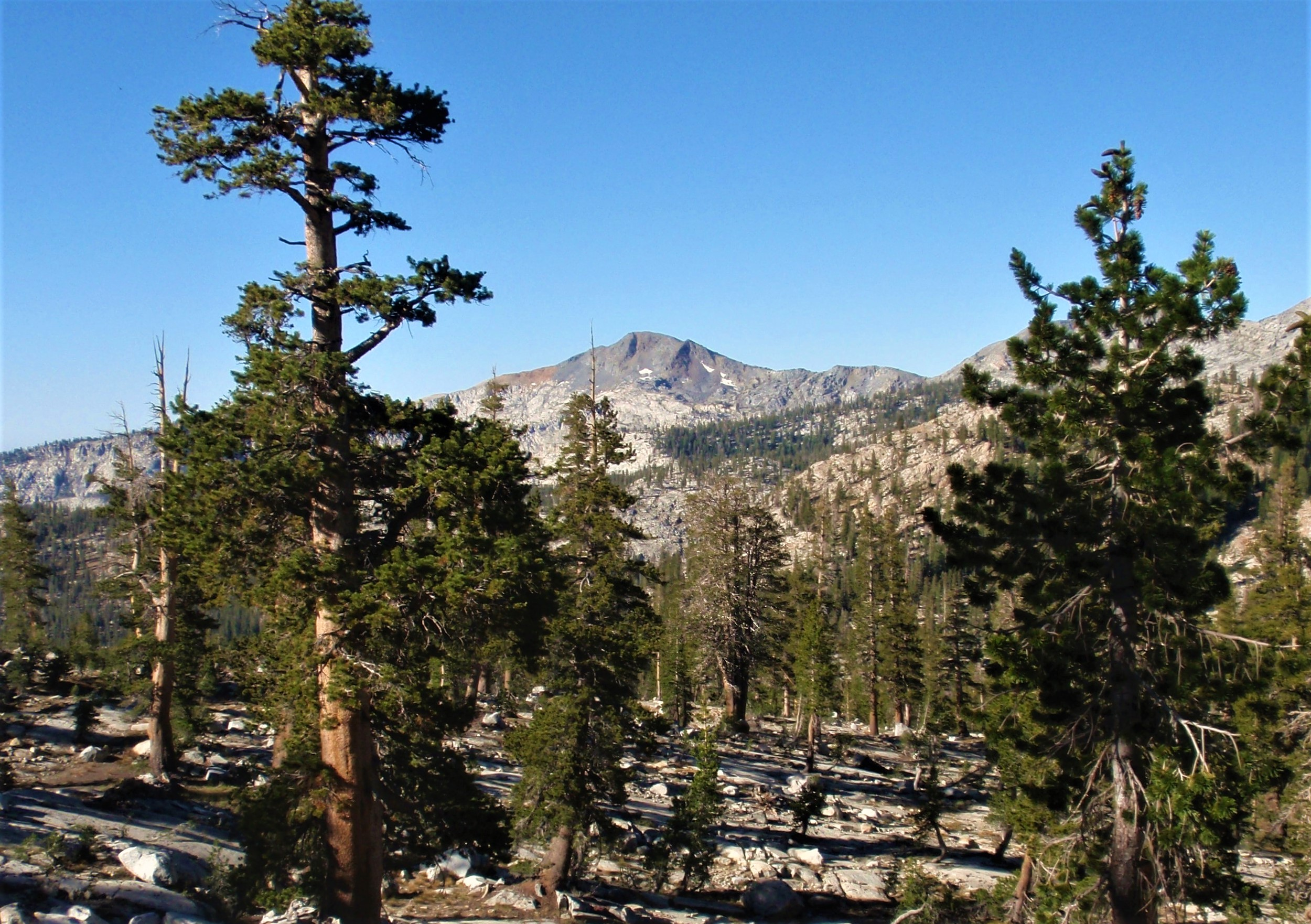
- North aspect, centered

Highest point
- Elevation: 10,509 ft (3,203 m)
- Prominence: 629 ft (192 m)
- Parent peak: Sing Peak (10,540 ft)
- Isolation: 1.33 mi (2.14 km)
- Coordinates: 37°32′15″N 119°22′29″W

Geography
- Location within California Location within the United States
- Location: Madera County, California, U.S.
- Parent range: Sierra Nevada
- Topo map: USGS Timber Knob

Geology
- Rock age: Cretaceous
- Mountain type: Fault block
- Rock type(s): Metamorphic rock, Granodiorite

Climbing
- First ascent: Unknown
- Easiest route: class 2 from southwest

Madera Peak is a 10,509-foot-elevation (3,203-meter) mountain summit located in the Sierra Nevada mountain range in Madera County, California, United States. It is situated in the Ansel Adams Wilderness on land managed by Sierra National Forest. Madera Peak is the southernmost summit of an ancient ridge from which the Clark Range formed. The mountain is set 2.2 miles (3.5 km) south-southeast of Gale Peak, and topographic relief is significant as the summit rises 1,600 feet (490 meters) above Lady Lake in 0.38 miles (0.61 km). Precipitation runoff from this landform drains into tributaries of the San Joaquin River.

== History ==
This geographical feature was originally named "Black Peak", but the Madera County Chamber of Commerce petitioned for the name to be changed to perpetuate the name of the county, thus the "Madera Peak" toponym was officially adopted in 1932 by the U.S. Board on Geographic Names. Madera County derived its name from the town of Madera, which in turn was laid out by the California Lumber Company in 1876. "Madera" is the Spanish language word for "wood".

The first ascent of the peak is unknown, however a cairn without a record was found on the summit in August 1931 by Hermina Daulton, Mr. and Mrs. Garthwaite and their seven-year-old son, Ted.

== Climate ==
According to the Köppen climate classification system, Madera Peak is located in an alpine climate zone. Most weather fronts originate in the Pacific Ocean and travel east toward the Sierra Nevada mountains. As fronts approach, they are forced upward by the peaks (orographic lift), causing them to drop their moisture in the form of rain or snowfall onto the range.

== Gallery ==
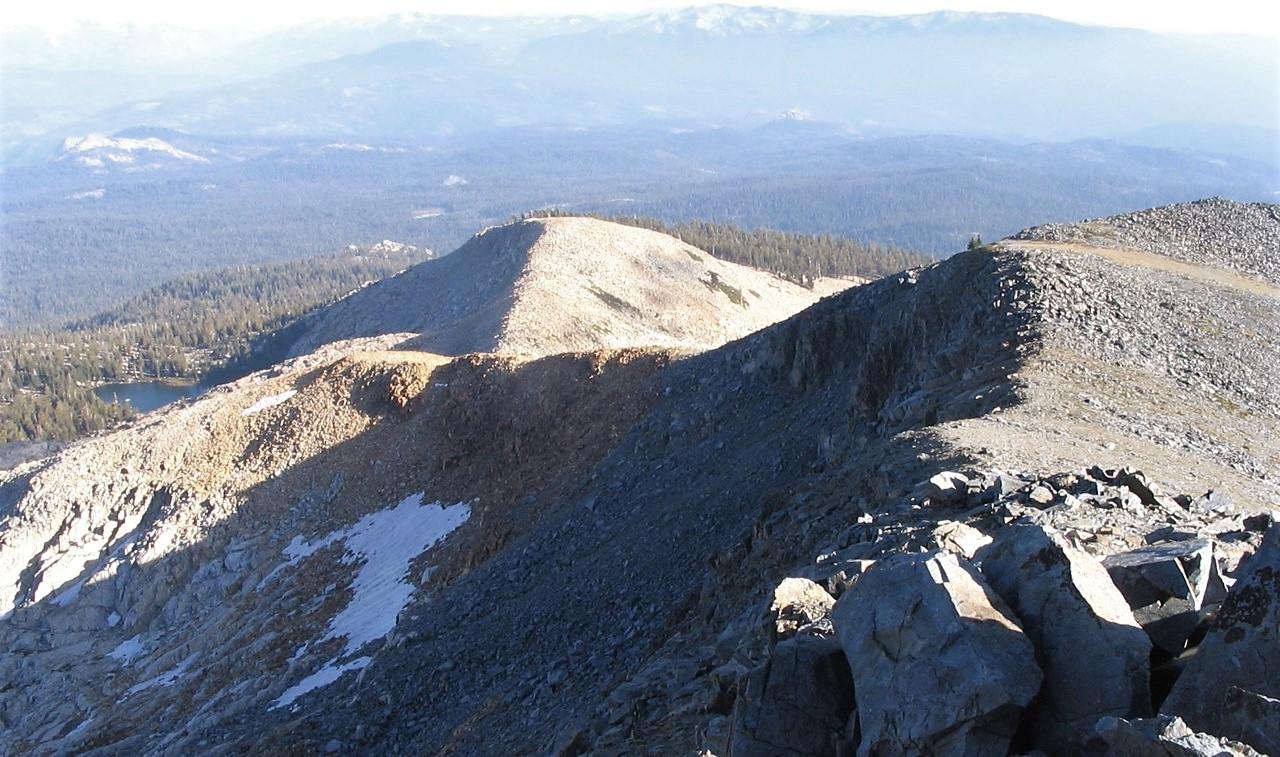
View from summit of Madera Peak looking southeast.

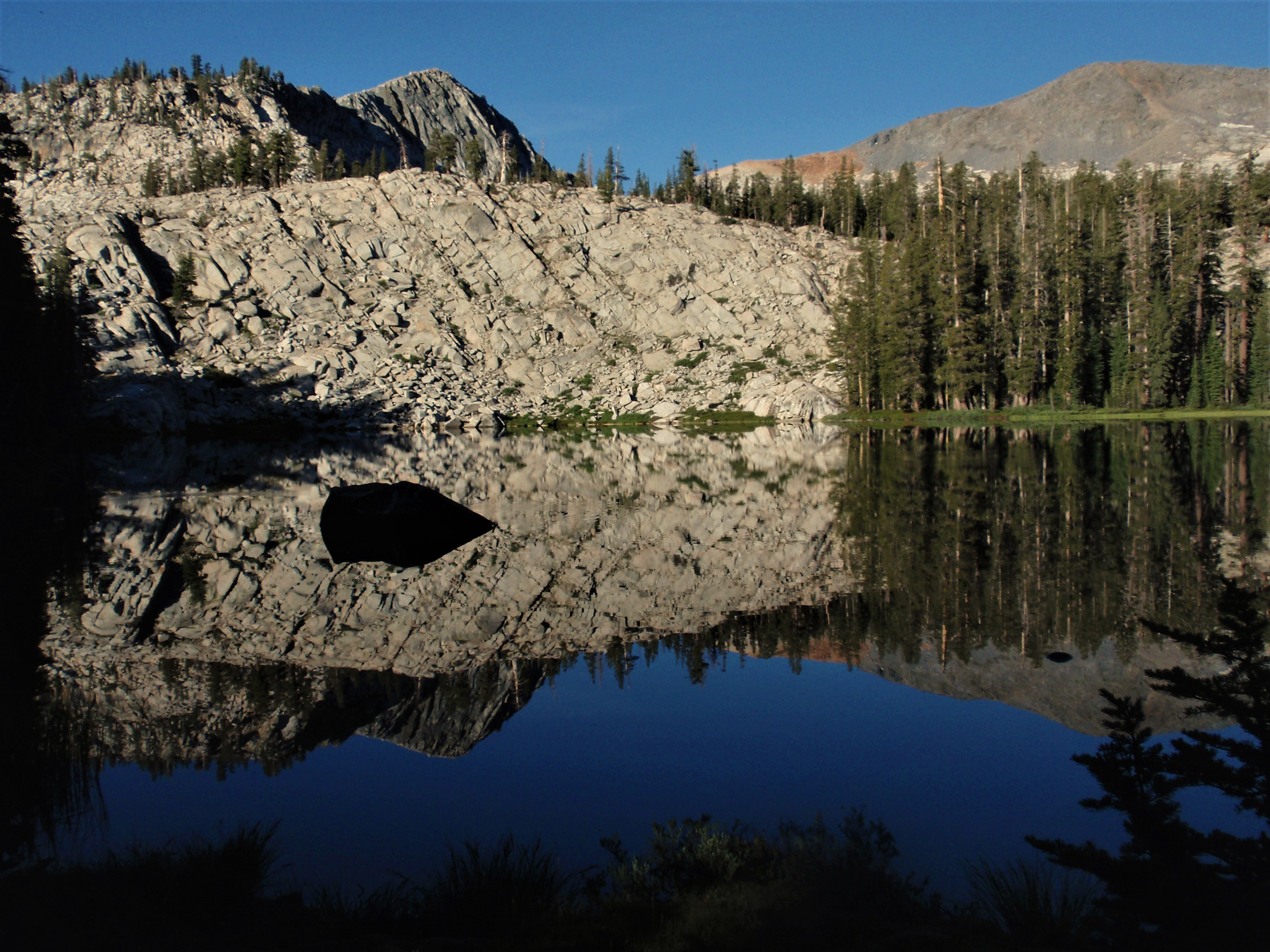
Northeast aspect of Madera Peak (upper right corner) from Vandeburg Lake.

== See also ==
- Geology of the Yosemite area
