= National Register of Historic Places listings in Drew County, Arkansas =

Location of Drew County in Arkansas

This is a list of the National Register of Historic Places listings in Drew County, Arkansas.

This is intended to be a complete list of the properties and districts on the National Register of Historic Places in Drew County, Arkansas, United States. The locations of National Register properties and districts for which the latitude and longitude coordinates are included below, may be seen in a map.

There are 27 properties and districts listed on the National Register in the county.

Contents: Counties in Arkansas
- Arkansas
- Ashley
- Baxter
- Benton
- Boone
- Bradley
- Calhoun
- Carroll
- Chicot
- Clark
- Clay
- Cleburne
- Cleveland
- Columbia
- Conway
- Craighead
- Crawford
- Crittenden
- Cross
- Dallas
- Desha
- Drew
- Faulkner
- Franklin
- Fulton
- Garland
- Grant
- Greene
- Hempstead
- Hot Spring
- Howard
- Independence
- Izard
- Jackson
- Jefferson
- Johnson
- Lafayette
- Lawrence
- Lee
- Lincoln
- Little River
- Logan
- Lonoke
- Madison
- Marion
- Miller
- Mississippi
- Monroe
- Montgomery
- Nevada
- Newton
- Ouachita
- Perry
- Phillips
- Pike
- Poinsett
- Polk
- Pope
- Prairie
- Pulaski (Little Rock)
- Randolph
- St. Francis
- Saline
- Scott
- Searcy
- Sebastian
- Sevier
- Sharp
- Stone
- Union
- Van Buren
- Washington
- White
- Woodruff
- Yell

This National Park Service list is complete through NPS recent listings posted July 4, 2026.

== Current listings ==
| | Name on the Register | Image | Date listed | Location | City or town | Description |
|---|---|---|---|---|---|---|
| 1 | Arkansas A&M College 4th District Faculty House | Arkansas A&M College 4th District Faculty House | May 9, 2022 (#100007719) | 481 University Dr. 33°35′22″N 91°48′53″W | Monticello | |
| 2 | Arkansas Agricultural and Mechanical College Student Union | | September 14, 2021 (#100006921) | 346 University Dr. 33°35′27″N 91°48′39″W | Monticello | |
| 3 | Bank of Tillar | Bank of Tillar | May 9, 2022 (#100007720) | 168 South Railroad St. 33°42′30″N 91°27′03″W | Tillar | |
| 4 | Garvin Cavaness House | Garvin Cavaness House | May 23, 1980 (#80000775) | 404 S. Main St. 33°37′22″N 91°47′30″W | Monticello | |
| 5 | Drew County Courthouse | Drew County Courthouse | October 17, 1997 (#97001226) | 210 S. Main St. 33°37′36″N 91°47′29″W | Monticello | |
| 6 | Fine Arts Building | Fine Arts Building | May 5, 2025 (#100011828) | 372 University Drive; 33°35′23″N 91°48′41″W | Monticello | |
| 7 | Champ Grubbs House | Champ Grubbs House | November 20, 1992 (#92001619) | Highway 172 west of New Hope; 33°30′46″N 91°56′03″W | New Hope | |
| 8 | Robert Lee Hardy House | Robert Lee Hardy House | April 26, 1982 (#82002113) | 207 S. Main St. 33°37′36″N 91°47′26″W | Monticello | |
| 9 | Harris and Horsfall Halls Historic District | Harris and Horsfall Halls Historic District | May 18, 2026 (#100013010) | 520 University Drive and 1514 Scogin Drive (University of Arkansas at Monticello); 33°35′27″N 91°48′51″W | Monticello | |
| 10 | Hotchkiss House | Hotchkiss House | December 12, 1976 (#76000404) | 509 N. Boyd St. 33°37′53″N 91°47′39″W | Monticello | |
| 11 | Jerome Elementary School No. 22 | Jerome Elementary School No. 22 | September 28, 2005 (#05001068) | N. Louisiana Boulevard; 33°24′11″N 91°28′08″W | Jerome | |
| 12 | Lambert House | Lambert House | December 22, 1983 (#83003545) | 204 W. Jackson St. 33°37′35″N 91°47′34″W | Monticello | |
| 13 | Look See Tree | Look See Tree | January 23, 2008 (#07001427) | Southwestern corner of the junction of Highway 83 and Pleasant Springs Rd. 33°47′10″N 91°44′59″W | Coleman | |
| 14 | Monticello Commercial Historic District | Monticello Commercial Historic District | September 23, 2011 (#11000688) | Bounded roughly by Trotter Ave., Edwards St., Railroad Ave. & Chester St. 33°37′46″N 91°47′27″W | Monticello | |
| 15 | Monticello Confederate Monument | Monticello Confederate Monument | April 26, 1996 (#96000449) | Oakland Cemetery, east of the junction of Oakland Ave. and Hyatt St. 33°38′04″N 91°47′52″W | Monticello | |
| 16 | Monticello North Main Street Historic District | Monticello North Main Street Historic District | February 18, 1979 (#79000437) | Irregular pattern along Westwood Ave. and N. Main St. 33°38′01″N 91°47′27″W | Monticello | |
| 17 | Monticello Post Office | Monticello Post Office | August 14, 1998 (#98000920) | 211 W. Gaines St. 33°37′46″N 91°47′31″W | Monticello | |
| 18 | Ridgeway Hotel Historic District | Ridgeway Hotel Historic District | January 22, 2009 (#08000952) | 200-206 E. Gaines St. 33°37′44″N 91°47′24″W | Monticello | |
| 19 | Rough and Ready Cemetery | Rough and Ready Cemetery | November 22, 1999 (#99001376) | Approximately 1 mile southeast of the Monticello Civic Center on State School Road; 33°36′30″N 91°47′21″W | Monticello | |
| 20 | St. Mary's Episcopal Church | St. Mary's Episcopal Church | April 4, 1996 (#96000352) | 115 S. Main St. 33°37′39″N 91°47′26″W | Monticello | |
| 21 | Saline Cemetery | Saline Cemetery | June 15, 2011 (#11000353) | .3 miles south of the junction of US 278 & Allis Rd. 33°37′11″N 91°54′30″W | Wilmar vicinity | |
| 22 | Science Building | Science Building | May 12, 2021 (#100006534) | 562 University Dr. 33°35′30″N 91°48′50″W | Monticello | |
| 23 | Selma Methodist Church | Selma Methodist Church | September 22, 1972 (#72000202) | North of Highway 4 in Selma; 33°41′52″N 91°34′11″W | Selma | |
| 24 | Selma Rosenwald School | Selma Rosenwald School | March 2, 2006 (#06000069) | Selma-Collins Rd., approximately 0.25 miles south of U.S. Route 278; 33°40′30″N 91°33′58″W | Selma | |
| 25 | Taylor Log House and Site | Taylor Log House and Site | October 16, 1995 (#95001168) | Highway 138 west of Winchester; 33°46′11″N 91°33′04″W | Winchester | |
| 26 | Frank Tillar Memorial Methodist Episcopal Church, South | Frank Tillar Memorial Methodist Episcopal Church, South | June 4, 1997 (#97000525) | W. Railroad St., north of Highway 277; 33°42′37″N 91°27′13″W | Tillar | |
| 27 | Veasey-DeArmond House | | September 14, 1989 (#89001424) | Highway 81, 15 miles north of Monticello; 33°30′41″N 91°51′31″W | Lacey | |

== See also ==
- List of National Historic Landmarks in Arkansas
- National Register of Historic Places listings in Arkansas
