= Drew County, Arkansas =

County in Arkansas, United States

- County
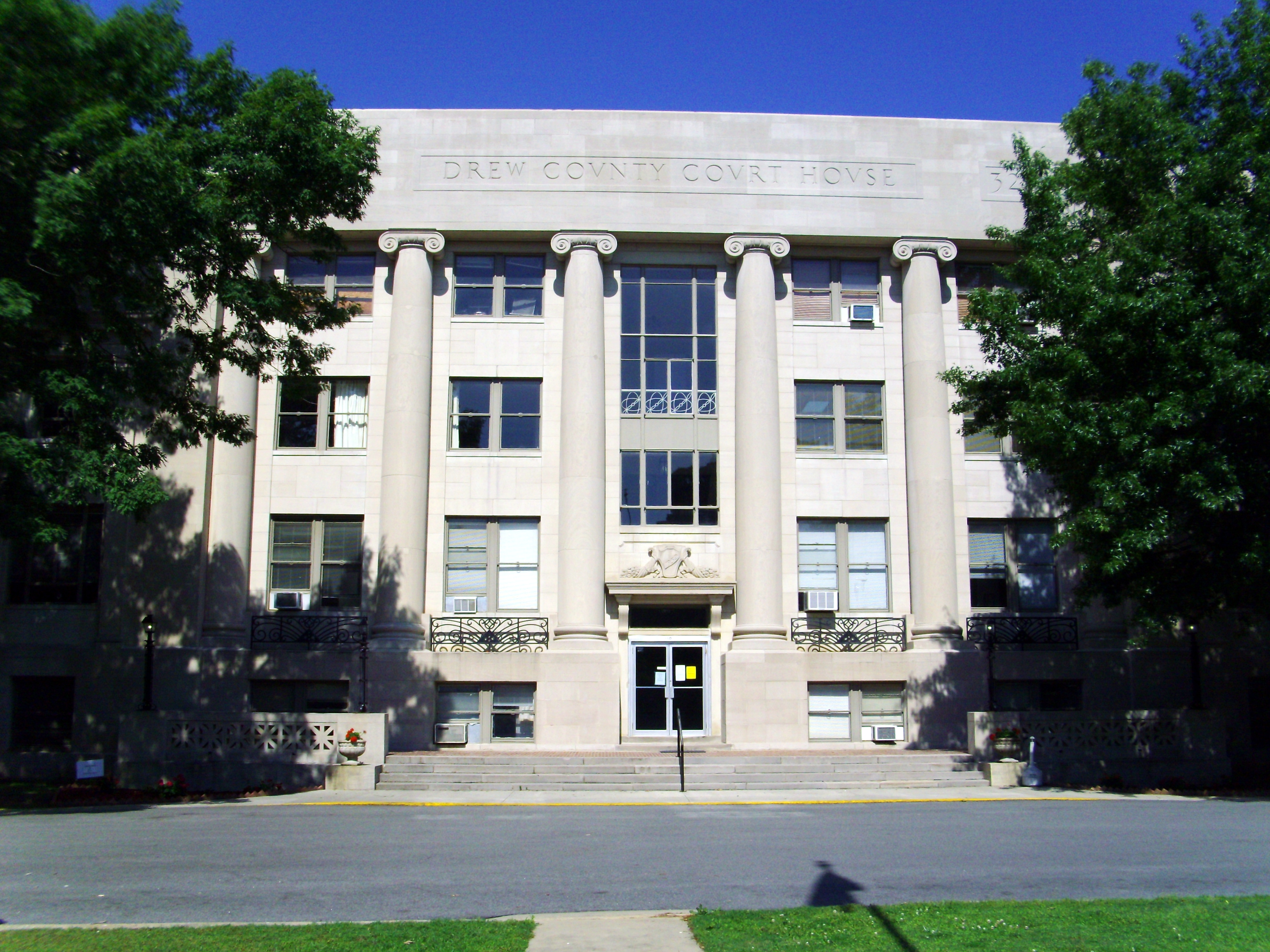
- Drew County Courthouse in Monticello

- Seal

- Location within the U.S. state of Arkansas
- Coordinates: 33°35′04″N 91°43′51″W
- Country: United States
- State: Arkansas
- Founded: November 26, 1846
- Named for: Thomas Drew
- Seat: Monticello
- Largest city: Monticello

Government
  - County Judge: Jessi Griffin

Area
  - Total: 836 sq mi (2,170 km^{2})
  - Land: 828 sq mi (2,140 km^{2})
  - Water: 7.3 sq mi (19 km^{2}) 0.9%

Population (2020)
  - Total: 17,350
  - Estimate (2025): 17,054 ▼
  - Density: 21.0/sq mi (8.09/km^{2})
- Time zone: UTC−6 (Central)
  - Summer (DST): UTC−5 (CDT)
- Congressional district: 4th
- Website: drewcoar.com

Drew County is a regional economic, educational, and cultural hub in the Southeast Arkansas region. Created as Arkansas's 51st county on November 26, 1846, Drew County contains four municipalities, including Monticello, the county seat and largest city. The county is named for Thomas Drew, the third governor of Arkansas.

Located mostly within the Piney Woods on the border with the Arkansas Delta, the county is largely flat to rolling and covered in pine-hardwood flatwoods or pine plantations.

Drew County occupies 835.51 square miles (2,164.0 km^{2}) and contained a population of 17,350 people in 7,133 households as of the 2020 census, ranking it 14th in size and 43rd in population among the state's 75 counties.

== History ==
Modern-day Drew County was once inhabited by the Folsom culture, and later by the Quapaw, who foraged and farmed much of present-day Arkansas. Drew County was created on November 26, 1846 from parts of Arkansas and Bradley counties. Part of Chicot County was added to Drew County in 1846. The first county seat was at the home of Alexander M. Rawles, until part of the county including the home was given to Ashley County in 1848. The county seat was relocated to Rough and Ready, an early settlement near Monticello. Parts of Desha County were added to Drew County in 1861 and 1873. Following the Civil War, the boundaries of Drew County changed as some property, including Mill Creek Township, was reassigned to the new Lincoln County established by the Reconstruction-era legislature in 1871. A final change in 1873 along the Chicot County line established the current boundaries of Drew County.

White settlers were predominantly from the Deep South, and farming was the predominant occupation. Located on the edge of the Arkansas Delta and the Arkansas Timberlands, its fertile lowland soils produced prosperity for early settlers in the antebellum era. Cotton was the major commodity crop, cultivated by the labor of enslaved African Americans. Corn, apples, peaches and tomatoes were also grown through their work. In the late 19th and early 20th centuries, timber harvesting became a more important industry here than cotton. The population declined from 1910 to 1970, as fewer workers were needed in timber. In addition, many African Americans left the oppressive social conditions of racial violence, disfranchisement, and Jim Crow laws to join the Great Migration to northern and midwestern industrial cities. After World War II, an even greater number migrated to the West Coast.

As a variety of industries began to move to the county, several colleges were founded here in the early part of the 20th century. One developed as University of Arkansas at Monticello. Today, the county has a diverse economy and is an economic center in southeast Arkansas. Its population is majority white; these voters are mostly affiliated with the Republican Party.

== Geography ==
Drew County is largely located in the South Central Plains, a United States Environmental Protection Agency (EPA) Level III ecoregion commonly known as the Piney Woods in the region. The eastern part of the county along Bayou Bartholomew is located in the Mississippi Alluvial Plain, more commonly known as the Arkansas Delta (in Arkansas, usually referred to as "the Delta").

Within the Piney Woods, much of the county is located in the Pleistocene Fluvial Terraces subregion. The Pleistocene Fluvial Terraces are nearly level, poorly-drained, periodically wet, and often covered by pine–hardwood flatwoods. Loblolly pine and oaks are common and are adapted to the prevailing hydroxeric regime; pastureland and hayland are less extensive. The lowest terrace is nearly flat, clayey, and has extensive hardwood wetlands. Higher terraces are dominated by pine flatwoods, pine savanna, prairie, or a mixed forest of pine and oak.

The northwest corner of Drew County, including an area surrounding Monticello, is located in the Tertiary Uplands subregion. The rolling Tertiary Uplands, gently to moderately sloping, are dominated by commercial pine plantations that have replaced the native oak–hickory–pine forest. Prominent native trees include shortleaf pine, loblolly pine, various oaks, hickories, and sweetgum. Scattered, stunted, sandhill woodlands and grasslands also occur. The landscape is dissected by numerous small streams. Waters tend to be stained by organics, with a sandy substrate and a forest canopy. Many do not flow during the summer or early fall. Water quality in forested basins is better than in pastureland. Oil production has lowered stream quality in the south. Timber production is the dominant land use, along with livestock grazing, poultry production, and oil and gas activities.

The Saline River floodplain on the western edge of Drew County is located within the Floodplains and Low Terraces subregion. Forested wetlands are characteristic, pastureland also occurs, and cropland is far less common. Overbank flooding, subsurface groundwater, and local precipitation recharge water levels in backswamps, pools, sloughs, oxbows, and depressions of this floodplain region. Potential natural vegetation is southern floodplain forest as in the Mississippi Alluvial Plain; it is unlike the oak–hickory–pine forest of the Tertiary Uplands.

The eastern part of Drew County is located within the Arkansas Delta, a flat area consisting of rich, fertile sediment deposits from the Mississippi River between Louisiana and Illinois. Bayou Bartholomew inhabits the longest section of abandoned channels of the Arkansas River within the Arkansas/Ouachita River Holocene Meander Belts subregion. Habitat diversity is sufficient for Bayou Bartholomew to be one of the most species-rich streams in North America. Within an abandoned course, bald cypress and water tupelo often grow in the modern stream channel adjacent to a strip of wet bottomland hardwood forest dominated by overcup oak and water hickory. The flats, swales, and natural levees of the Arkansas/Ouachita River Backswamps subregion serves as a buffer between Bayou Bartholomew and the Piney Woods. Water often collects into marshes, swamps, oxbow lakes, ponds, and sloughs. Artificial drainage canals and ditches are common, resulting in farming of rice, cotton, and soybeans, but forests and forested wetlands also occur.

According to the U.S. Census Bureau, the county has a total area of 835.51 square miles (2,164.0 km^{2}), of which 828 square miles (2,140 km^{2}) is land and 7.3 square miles (19 km^{2}) (0.9%) is water.

The county is located approximately 89 miles (143 km) southeast of Little Rock, 159 miles (256 km) northeast of Shreveport, Louisiana, and 175 miles (282 km) northwest of Jackson, Mississippi. (Note: Mileages from Drew County to Little Rock, Shreveport, and Jackson are based on highway miles using county seat Monticello for Drew County.) Drew County is surrounded by Lincoln County to the north, Desha County to the northeast, Chicot County to the southeast, Ashley County to the south, Bradley County to the west, and Cleveland County to the northwest.

=== Hydrology ===
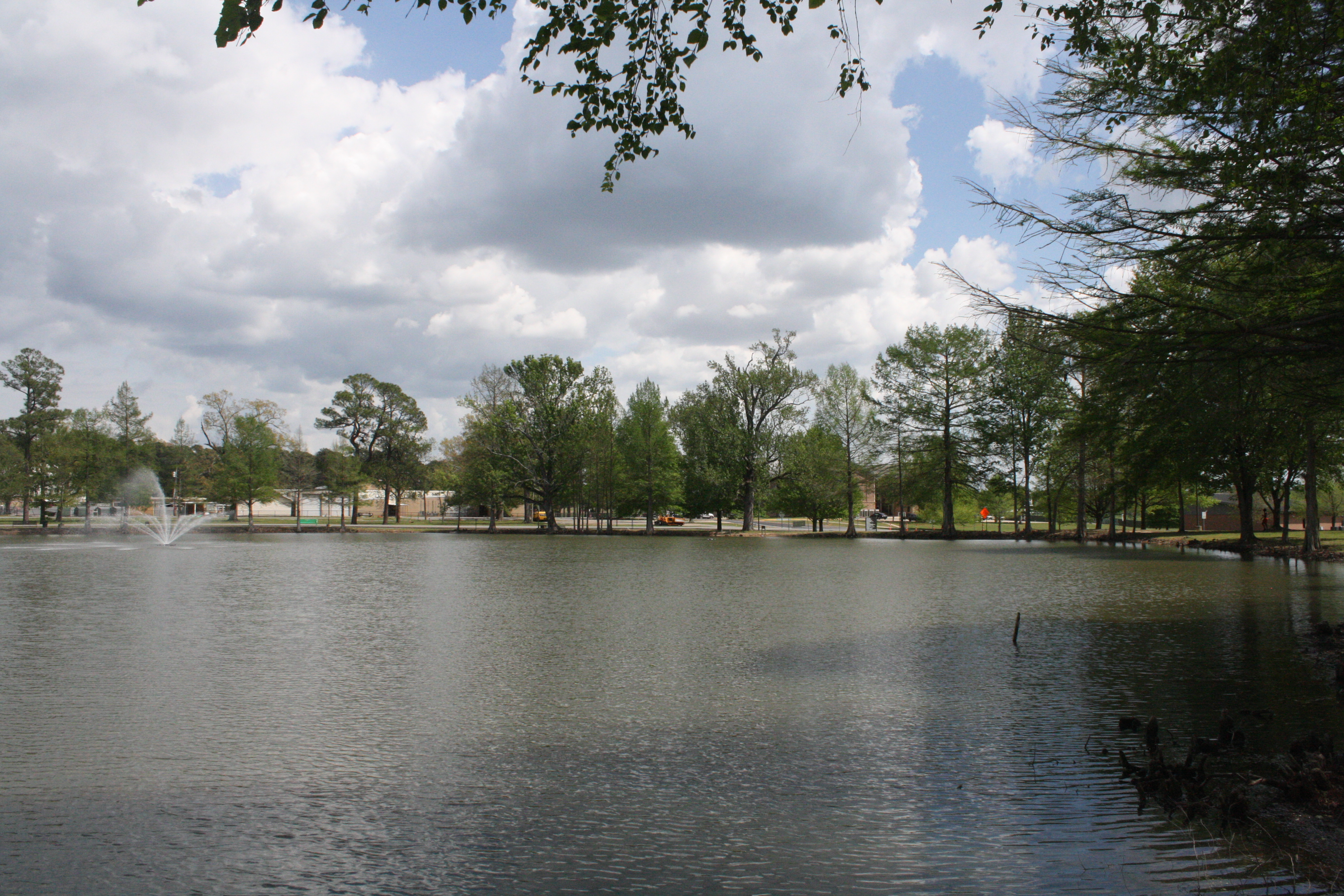
Weevil Pond on the campus of the University of Arkansas at Monticello

The Monticello Ridge, which extends from north of Star City, Arkansas through Drew County into Louisiana roughly along US 425, splits the county into two large watersheds: Bayou Bartholomew on the east and the Saline River on the west. Tributaries of Bayou Bartholomew in eastern Drew County include Ables Creek and Cut-Off Creek. Much of eastern Drew County drains to Cut-Off Creek via tributaries, including Hurricane Creek, Loggy Bayou, (Note: Loggy Bayou is a swamp in Drew County, not to be confused with a bayou of the same name in northwestern Louisiana.) Sandy Creek, Rainbow Creek, Wolf Creek, which empties into Bayou Bartholomew shortly after entering Ashley County. Western Drew County drains into the Saline River watershed. Tributaries include Hudgens Creek, Lake Monticello/Hungry Run Creek, Langford Creek, Tenmile Creek, Clear Creek, and Brown Creek. The portion of the Saline River forming the southwestern boundary of Drew County has also been designated as a Natural and Scenic Waterway by the Arkansas Department of Energy and Environment.

=== Protected areas ===
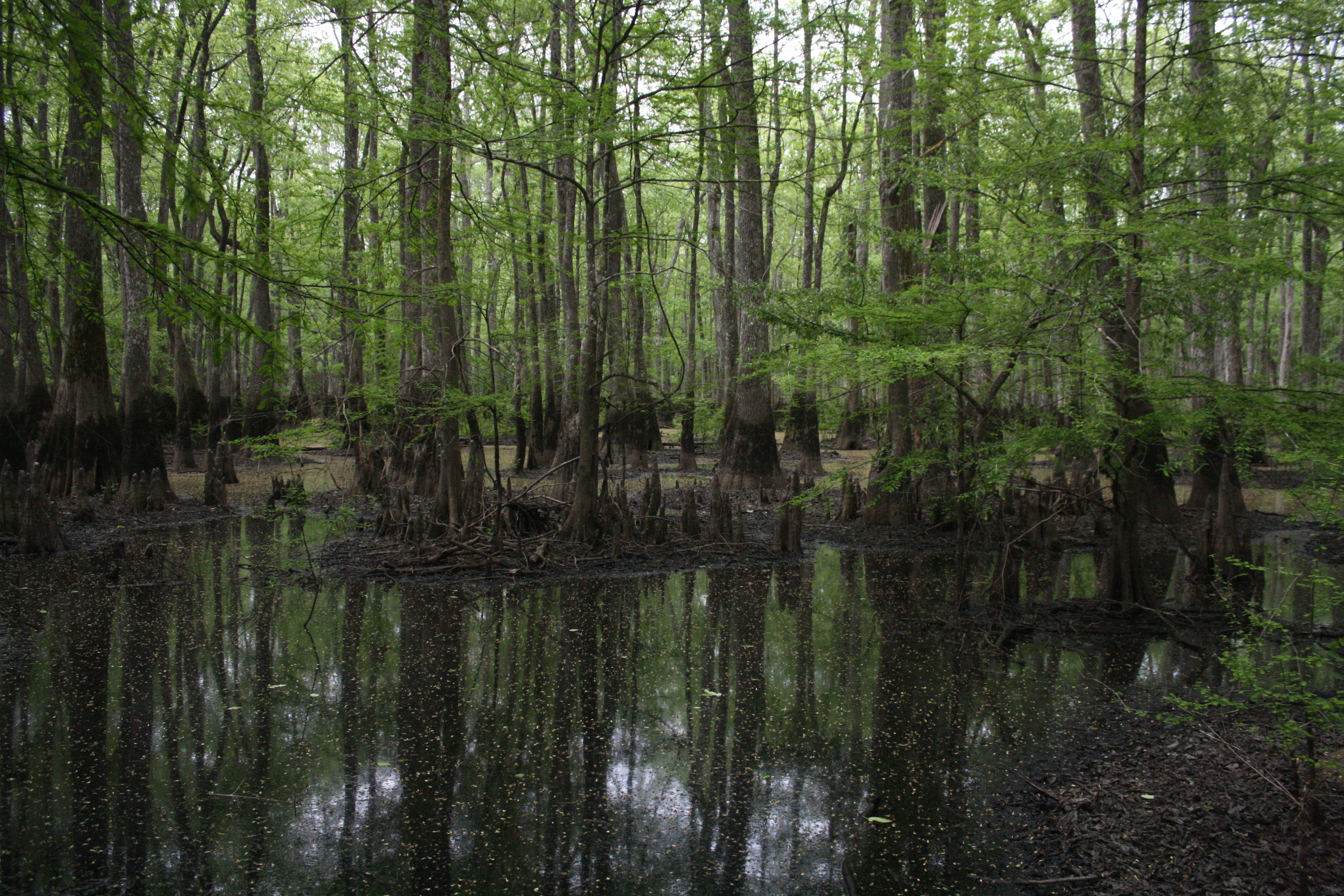
Seven Devils Swamp Natural Area

Two state agencies own and maintain areas of natural and cultural value for enjoyment and use by residents and visitors of Drew County. Protected areas are located along the waterways on the county's eastern and western edges. Casey Jones Wildlife Management Area (WMA), a discontinuous series of parcels owned by timber companies and intensively managed for pine leased by the Arkansas Game and Fish Commission (AGFC) to allow permit hunting, contains tracts on both sides of the county. On the east side of Drew County, AGFC also maintains Seven Devils Swamp WMA, known for waterfowl hunting, fishing, and deer hunting, within which a small portion is preserved by the Arkansas Natural Heritage Commission (ANHC) as Seven Devils Swamp Natural Area (NA). Similarly, AGFC maintains Cut-Off Creek WMA near Troy, popular with duck hunters but also used by turkey and black bear hunters, anglers, and paddlers using the Cut-Off Creek Water Trail. Within the WMA, ANHC maintains Cut-Off Creek Ravines NA and Thorney Brake NA. On the western side of Drew County, ANHC maintains Warren Prairie NA, with an interpretive trail passing through pine flatwoods, saline barrens, and salt licks rich with wildlife diversity and designated as an Important Bird Area.

== Demographics ==
Historical population
Census	Pop.	Note	%±
1850	3,276		—
1860	9,078		177.1%
1870	9,960		9.7%
1880	12,231		22.8%
1890	17,352		41.9%
1900	19,451		12.1%
1910	21,960		12.9%
1920	21,822		−0.6%
1930	19,928		−8.7%
1940	19,831		−0.5%
1950	17,959		−9.4%
1960	15,213		−15.3%
1970	15,157		−0.4%
1980	17,910		18.2%
1990	17,369		−3.0%
2000	18,723		7.8%
2010	18,509		−1.1%
2020	17,350		−6.3%
2025 (est.)	17,054	▼	−1.7%
U.S. Decennial Census; 1790–1960 1900–1990; 1990–2000 2010

=== 2020 census ===
As of the 2020 census, the county had a population of 17,350. The median age was 38.4 years; 22.9% of residents were under the age of 18 and 17.9% were 65 years of age or older. For every 100 females there were 93.7 males, and for every 100 females age 18 and over there were 88.8 males age 18 and over.

The racial makeup of the county was 65.1% White, 27.9% Black or African American, 0.5% American Indian and Alaska Native, 0.6% Asian, 0.1% Native Hawaiian and Pacific Islander, 2.1% from some other race, and 3.7% from two or more races. Hispanic or Latino residents of any race comprised 3.8% of the population.

About 46.0% of residents lived in urban areas, while 54.0% lived in rural areas.

There were 7,133 households in the county, of which 29.9% had children under the age of 18 living in them. Of all households, 43.1% were married-couple households, 19.3% were households with a male householder and no spouse or partner present, and 32.1% were households with a female householder and no spouse or partner present. About 31.0% of all households were made up of individuals and 12.9% had someone living alone who was 65 years of age or older.

There were 8,259 housing units, of which 13.6% were vacant. Among occupied housing units, 64.6% were owner-occupied and 35.4% were renter-occupied. The homeowner vacancy rate was 2.0% and the rental vacancy rate was 11.9%.

The median income for a household in the county was $42,924, and the median income for a family was $65,428. The per capita income for the county was $26,440. About 13.4% of families and 20.4% of the population were below the poverty line, including 25.9% of those under age 18 and 12.7% of those age 65 or over.

=== 2000 census ===
As of the 2000 census, there were 18,723 people, 7,337 households, and 5,091 families residing in the county. The population density was 23 people per square mile (8.9 people/km^{2}). There were 8,287 housing units at an average density of 10 units per square mile (3.9 units/km^{2}). The racial makeup of the county was 70.30% White, 27.16% Black or African American, 0.25% Native American, 0.42% Asian, 0.02% Pacific Islander, 1.00% from other races, and 0.85% from two or more races. 1.76% of the population were Hispanic or Latino of any race.

There were 7,337 households, out of which 33.50% had children under the age of 18 living with them, 51.30% were married couples living together, 14.20% had a female householder with no husband present, and 30.60% were non-families. 26.00% of all households are made and 10.50% had someone living alone who was 65 years of age or older. The average household size was 2.46 and the average family size was 2.97.

In the county, the population was spread out, with 25.80% under the age of 18, 12.60% from 18 to 24, 27.20% from 25 to 44, 21.50% from 45 to 64, and 12.80% who were 65 years of age or older. The median age was 34 years. For every 100 females there were 94.10 males. For every 100 females age 18 and over, there were 91.50 males.

The median income for a household in the county was $28,627, and the median income for a family was $37,317. Males had a median income of $30,794 versus $20,707 for females. The per capita income for the county was $16,264. About 13.10% of families and 18.20% of the population were below the poverty line, including 21.90% of those under age 18 and 21.80% of those age 65 or over.

== Human resources ==
=== Education ===
Educational attainment in Drew County is typical for an Arkansas county, with a 2024 study finding 88.8% of Drew County residents over age 25 held a high school degree or higher, slightly below Arkansas and national averages of 89.3% and 89.9%, respectively. Drew County's proportion of population holding a bachelor's degree or higher is 25.6%, below the state average of 27.1% and national average of 36.8%.

==== Primary and secondary education ====
Two public school districts are based in Drew County: Monticello School District is the larger of the two school districts in the county by number of students, with the Drew Central School District serving most of the rural area of the county. Both are based in Monticello. Successful completion of the curriculum of these schools leads to graduation from Monticello High School or Drew Central High School, respectively. Both high schools offer Advanced Placement (AP) courses and are accredited by the Arkansas Department of Education (ADE). Small portions of Drew County are also served by Dermott, Dumas, Hamburg, and McGehee districts in neighboring counties.

==== Higher education ====
Within Drew County, the University of Arkansas at Monticello is a four-year public university and part of the University of Arkansas System.

==== Libraries ====
Drew County is home to the Monticello Branch Library at 114 W Jefferson Avenue in Monticello, which also houses the headquarters of the Southeast Arkansas Regional Library system, a fourteen branch library system. The Fred J. Taylor Library & Technology Center is an academic library on the University of Arkansas at Monticello campus.

=== Public safety ===
The Drew County Sheriff's Office is the primary law enforcement agency in the county. The agency is led by the Drew County Sheriff, an official elected by countywide vote every four years. Monticello is the only municipal police department in Drew County; Tillar and Wilmar contract with the Drew County Sheriff's Office for law enforcement services.

The county is under the jurisdiction of the 28th District court, a state district court of original jurisdiction for criminal, civil, small claims, and traffic matters that also includes Bradley County. Drew County matters are heard in Monticello. State district courts are presided over by a full-time district judge elected to a four-year term by a districtwide election. Superseding district court jurisdiction is the 10th Judicial Circuit Court, which covers Ashley, Bradley, Chicot, Desha and Drew counties. The 10th Circuit contains five judges elected circuitwide to a six-year term.

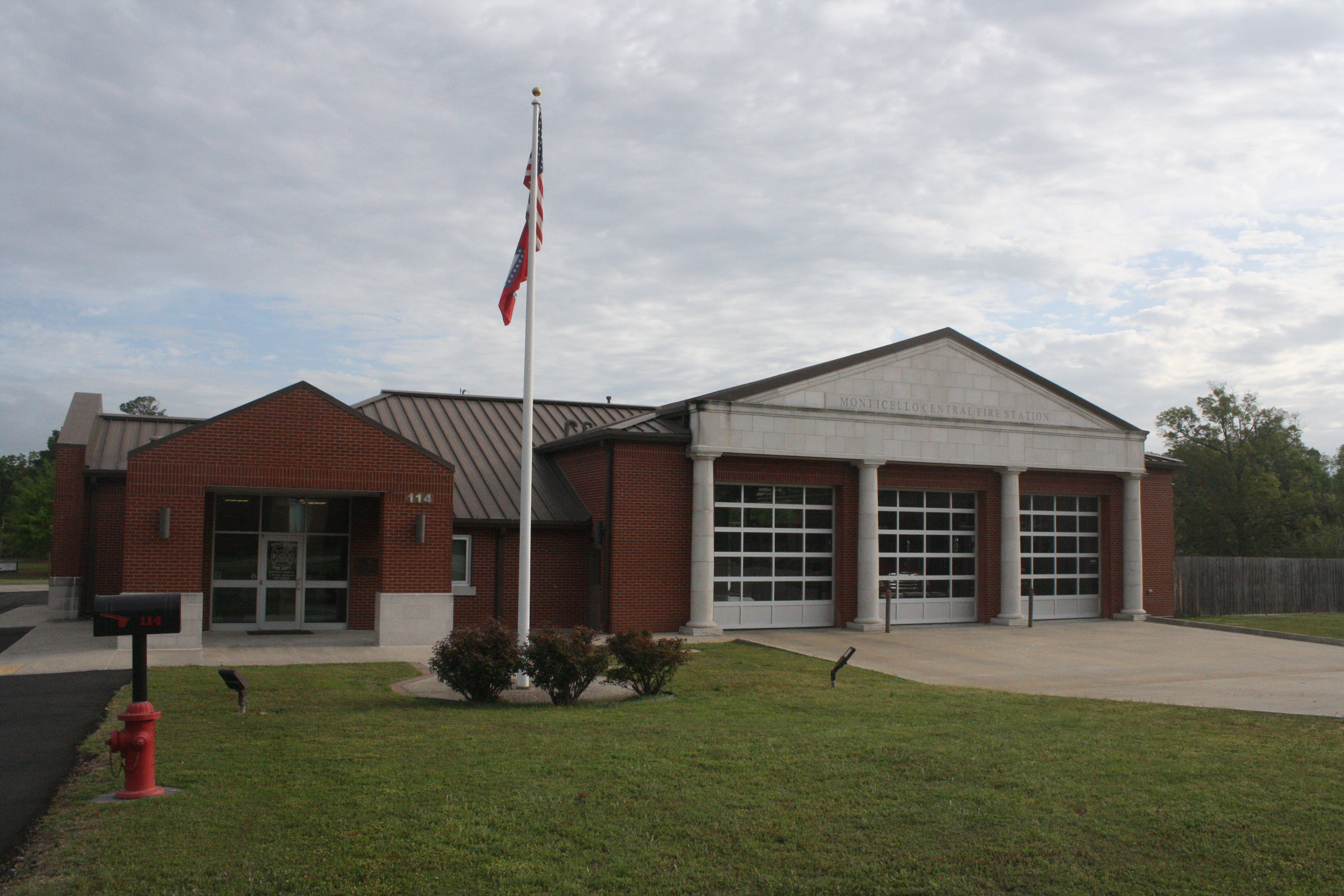
Monticello Central Fire Station

Fire protection, prevention and suppression is provided by ten agencies in Drew County, together covering the entire county. The four incorporated municipalities each provide fire protection, including areas beyond corporate limits. Rural areas are served by the Clear Creek, Collins-Cominto, Dermott, Green Hill Valley, Lacey-Ladelle, and Selma volunteer fire departments. All fire departments in Drew County are volunteer-based, except the Monticello Fire Department.

== Culture and contemporary life ==
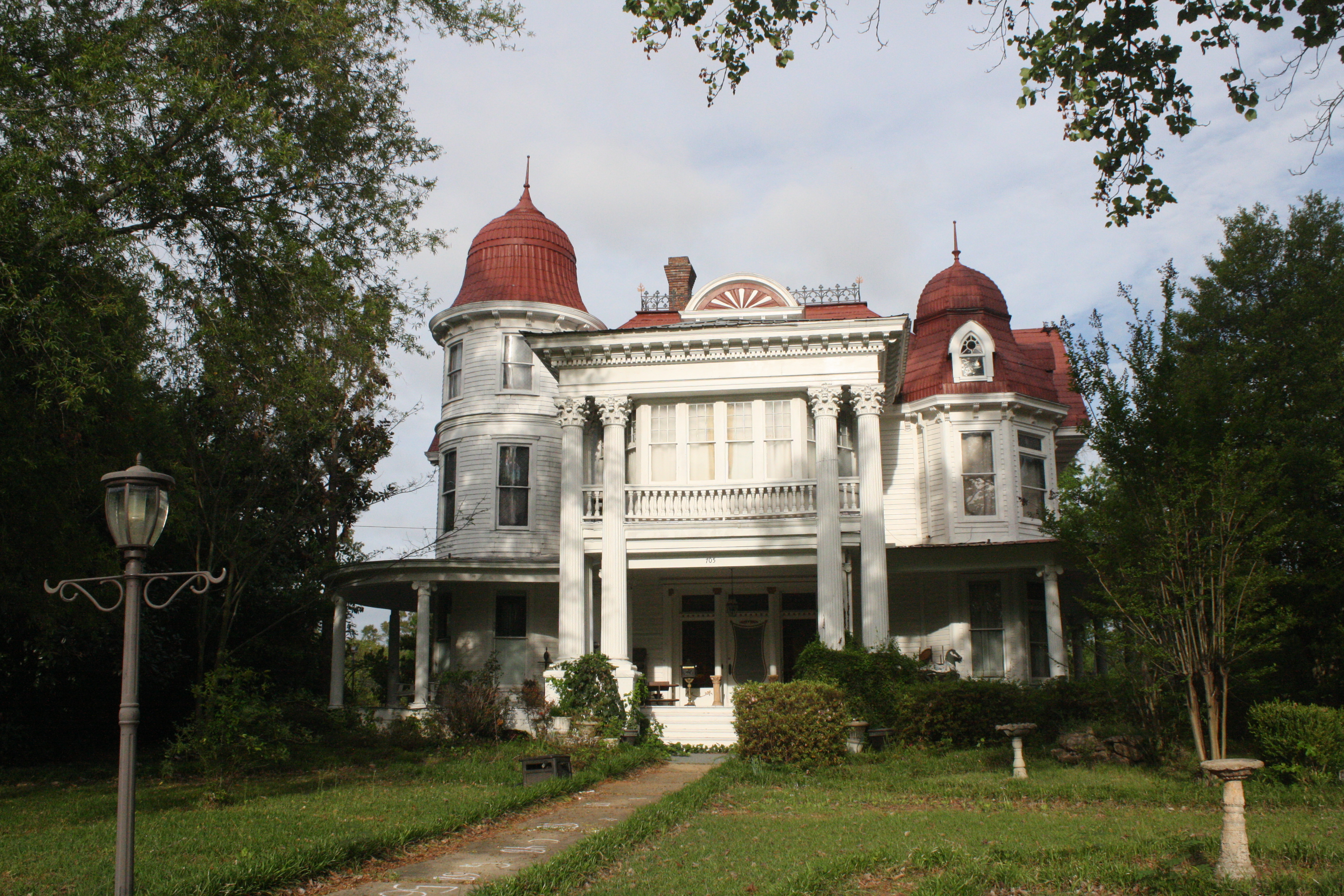
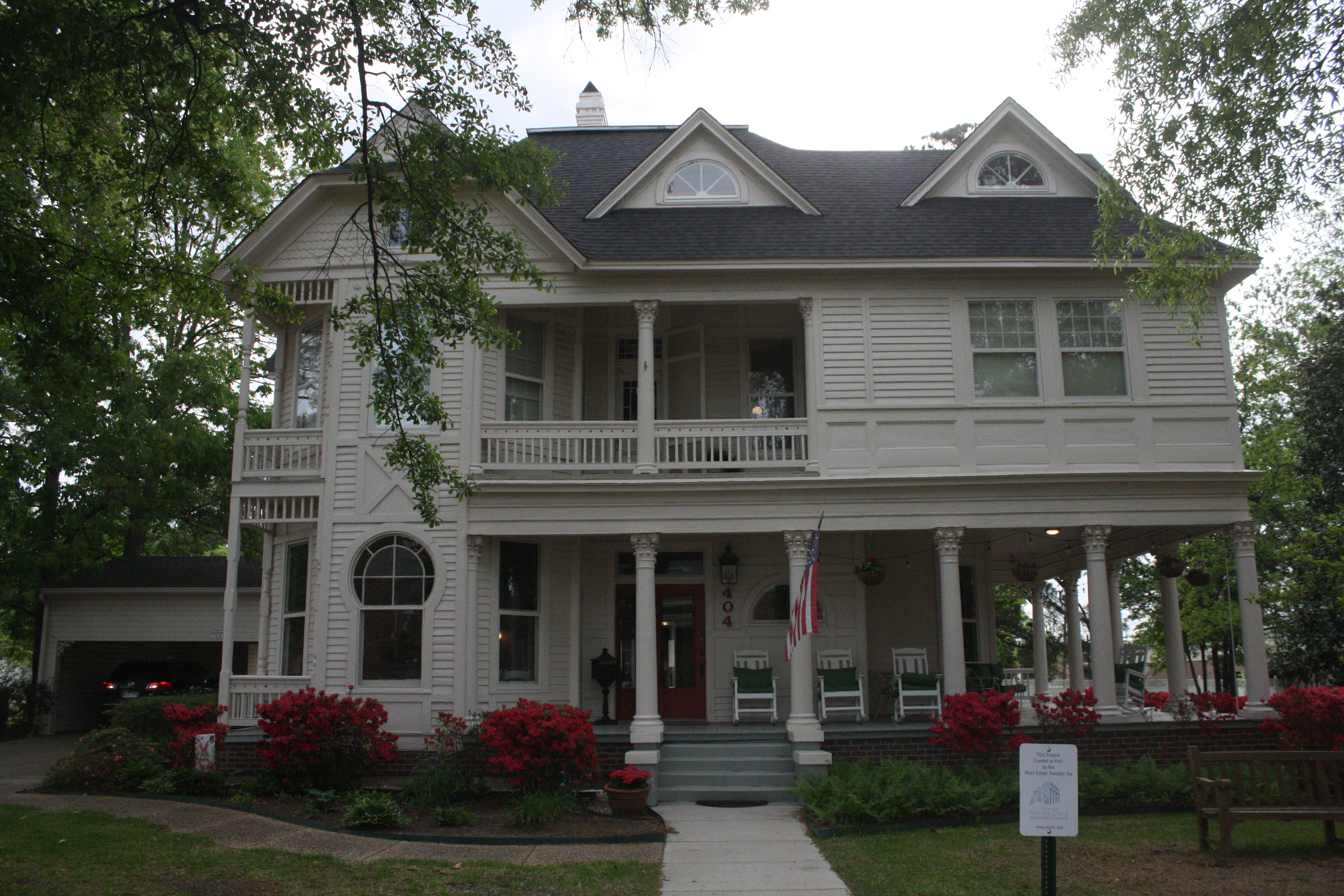
Two locally famous contributing properties to the North Main Historic District are the Allen House (top) and Trotter House

Drew County has several facilities, monuments, and museums dedicated to preserving the history and culture of the area. Several historic structures remain in the county from the pioneer era, including the Champ Grubbs House and the Taylor Log House and Site, and the Rough and Ready Cemetery. The Drew County Historical Museum is a local history museum, and the Turner Neal Museum of Natural History and Pomeroy Planetarium on the UAM campus describe natural history and the structure and composition of the Universe. The Jerome War Relocation Center was a former Japanese American internment camp that later served as a holding camp for German prisoners of war.

Several National Register of Historic Places (NRHP, complete county list) properties in the county relate to the county's early development as a hub of the Southeast Arkansas agricultural economy, including the Bank of Tillar, Monticello Commercial Historic District, Ridgeway Hotel, and many private homes built in Monticello during the period, including the North Main Historic District. Educational history is also preserved through several buildings listed on the UAM campus, Jerome Elementary School No. 22, and the Selma Rosenwald School. The importance of religion in the region is preserved in the Tillar Methodist Church, Selma Methodist Church, and the St. Mary's Episcopal Church.

A temperance society formed in Monticello in 1865. Lydia Chase visited Monticello in 1876 and formed the first chapter of the Woman's Christian Temperance Union in Arkansas. A vote to close saloons in town passed in 1888. After this, the Drew County judge refused to issue new saloon licenses in all of Drew County. The town defeated an initiative to go "wet" in 1953.

== Government ==
The county government is a constitutional body granted specific powers by the Constitution of Arkansas and the Arkansas Code. The quorum court is the legislative branch of the county government and controls all spending and revenue collection. Representatives are called justices of the peace and are elected from county districts every even-numbered year. The number of districts in a county vary from nine to fifteen, and district boundaries are drawn by the county election commission. The Drew County Quorum Court has nine members. Presiding over quorum court meetings is the county judge, who serves as the chief operating officer of the county. The county judge is elected at-large and does not vote in quorum court business, although capable of vetoing quorum court decisions.

Drew County, Arkansas Elected countywide officials
Position	Officeholder	Party
County Judge	Jessie Griffin	Republican
County Clerk	Stephanie Chisom	Republican
Circuit Clerk	Beverly Burks	Independent
Sheriff	Tim Nichols	Republican
Treasurer	Charles Searcy	Republican
Collector	Tonya Loveless	Independent
Assessor	Cheri Adcock	Republican
Coroner	Charles Dearman Jr.	Republican

The composition of the Quorum Court following the 2024 elections is 9 Republicans. Justices of the Peace (members) of the Quorum Court following the elections are:

- District 1: Orlando Jones (R)
- District 2: Ben David Higginbotham (R)
- District 3: Roger Harris (R)
- District 4: Sheila Maxwell (R)
- District 5: Steven Pigott (R)
- District 6: Donna Harton Usry (R)
- District 7: Craig Kaminicki (R)
- District 8: Frank Appleberry (R)
- District 9: Zachary Hill (R)

Additionally, the townships of Drew County are entitled to elect their own respective constables, as set forth by the Constitution of Arkansas. Constables are largely of historical significance as they were used to keep the peace in rural areas when travel was more difficult. The township constables as of the 2024 elections are:

- Clear Creek: Jessica Moore (R)
- Collins: John W. Beatty (R)
- Cominto: Michael Frisby (R)
- Marion: Shane Hale (R)
- Saline: Steve Sturgis (R)
- Veasey: Scott Chapman (R)

=== Politics ===
Since the late 20th century, conservative white voters of Drew County have favored GOP presidential candidates. The last Democrat at the presidential level (as of 2024) to carry this county was Vice President Al Gore in 2000, who was a son of the South from Tennessee.

United States presidential election results for Drew County, Arkansas
Year	Republican		Democratic		Third party(ies)	
Year	No.	%	No.	%	No.	%
1896	603	25.46%	1,754	74.07%	11	0.46%
1900	569	33.77%	1,099	65.22%	17	1.01%
1904	593	37.44%	953	60.16%	38	2.40%
1908	679	36.54%	1,123	60.44%	56	3.01%
1912	424	26.45%	882	55.02%	297	18.53%
1916	838	34.00%	1,627	66.00%	0	0.00%
1920	773	35.17%	1,397	63.56%	28	1.27%
1924	563	35.12%	1,018	63.51%	22	1.37%
1928	500	25.56%	1,452	74.23%	4	0.20%
1932	198	10.06%	1,760	89.39%	11	0.56%
1936	70	5.38%	1,229	94.47%	2	0.15%
1940	152	10.06%	1,329	87.95%	30	1.99%
1944	320	18.92%	1,370	81.02%	1	0.06%
1948	182	8.98%	1,204	59.40%	641	31.62%
1952	1,040	31.46%	2,261	68.39%	5	0.15%
1956	1,265	35.28%	2,234	62.30%	87	2.43%
1960	889	26.36%	2,107	62.49%	376	11.15%
1964	2,109	51.18%	1,980	48.05%	32	0.78%
1968	1,040	22.27%	1,324	28.35%	2,307	49.39%
1972	3,334	74.06%	1,168	25.94%	0	0.00%
1976	1,730	31.57%	3,750	68.43%	0	0.00%
1980	2,272	36.74%	3,757	60.75%	155	2.51%
1984	3,407	56.10%	2,638	43.44%	28	0.46%
1988	2,995	53.29%	2,578	45.87%	47	0.84%
1992	1,938	30.77%	3,748	59.51%	612	9.72%
1996	1,657	29.20%	3,570	62.91%	448	7.89%
2000	2,756	46.54%	3,060	51.67%	106	1.79%
2004	3,262	52.20%	2,952	47.24%	35	0.56%
2008	3,860	58.40%	2,598	39.30%	152	2.30%
2012	3,887	58.60%	2,630	39.65%	116	1.75%
2016	3,968	60.17%	2,365	35.86%	262	3.97%
2020	4,349	62.96%	2,426	35.12%	133	1.93%
2024	4,203	66.03%	2,050	32.21%	112	1.76%

== Communities ==
Two incorporated cities and two incorporated towns are located within the county. The largest city and county seat, Monticello, is located in the central part of the county. Monticello's population in 2020 was 6,608. The county's remaining municipalities all have a population under 500 as of the 2020 Census, with Tillar partly located in Desha County. Wilmar is located in western Drew County, with Winchester located in northeastern Drew County.

Drew County has dozens of unincorporated communities and ghost towns within its borders. This is due to early settlers in Arkansas tending to settle in small clusters rather than incorporated towns. For example, communities like Collins had a post office and dozens of buildings at some point in their history. Communities such as Barkada, Baxter, Grace, and Wilmar were established around former plantations. Cominto, Deane, Lacey, Selma, Shiloh, Tennessee, Winchester, and others were mill towns. Reed Settlement and Oakwoods were established for freedmen during the Reconstruction Era. Negro Bend was settled by blacks who were whitecapped out of Possum Valley. Some are officially listed as populated places by the United States Geological Survey, and others are listed as historic settlements.

=== Unincorporated communities ===
- Allis
- Barkada
- Baxter
- Bethel
- Beulah
- Brandon
- Carpenter
- Coleman
- College Heights
- Collins
- Cominto
- Dean
- Enon
- Florence
- Goose Hollow
- Green Hill
- Jerome
- Killin
- Lacey
- Ladelle
- Lewis
- Montogo
- New Hope
- Plantersville
- Possum Valley
- Prairie Grove
- Rock Springs
- Rose Hill
- Scipio
- Selma
- Shiloh
- Sixteenth Section
- Tennessee
- Valley Junction
- Youngstown

=== Historical communities ===
- Bowser
- Jade
- Jeter
- Jordan
- Leavits
- Lone Sasafras
- Moody
- Negro Bend
- Oakwoods
- Old Piney
- Old Union
- Ozment Bluff
- Paradise
- Red Neck
- Reed Settlement
- Rough and Ready
- Scrouge Out
- Troy

=== Townships ===
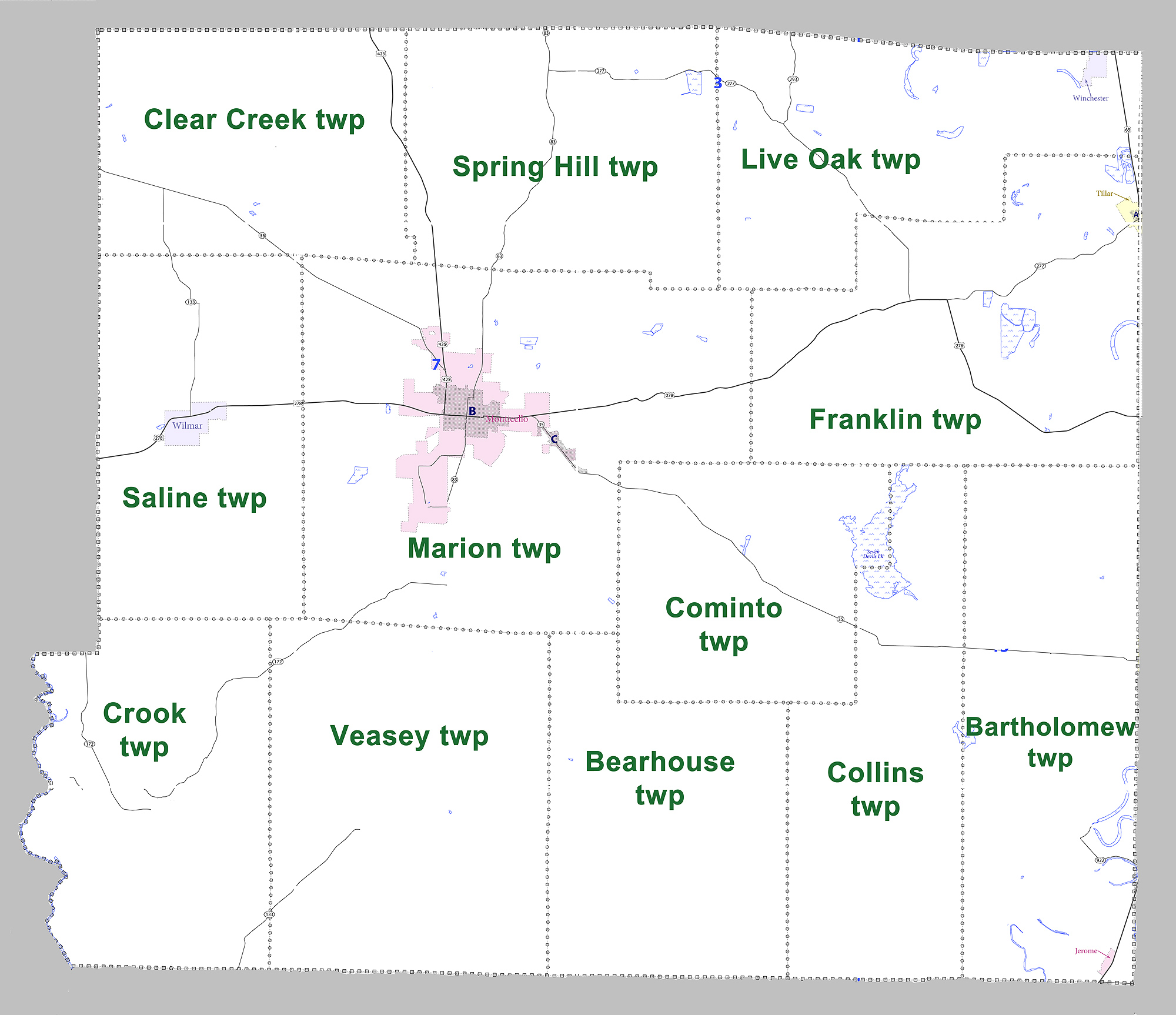
Townships in Drew County, Arkansas as of 2010

Townships in Arkansas are the divisions of a county. Each township includes unincorporated areas; some may have incorporated cities or towns within part of their boundaries. Arkansas townships have limited purposes in modern times. However, the United States census does list Arkansas population based on townships (sometimes referred to as "county subdivisions" or "minor civil divisions"). Townships are also of value for historical purposes in terms of genealogical research. Each town or city is within one or more townships in an Arkansas county based on census maps and publications. The townships of Drew County are listed below; listed in parentheses are the cities, towns, and/or census-designated places that are fully or partially inside the township.

- Bartholomew (contains Jerome)
- Bearhouse
- Clear Creek
- Collins
- Cominto
- Crook
- Franklin (contains part of Tillar)
- Live Oak (contains Winchester)
- Marion (contains Monticello)
- Saline (contains Wilmar)
- Spring Hill
- Veasey

== Infrastructure ==
=== Major highways ===
- Future Interstate 69
- Future Interstate 530
- U.S. Highway 65
- U.S. Highway 165
- U.S. Highway 278
- U.S. Highway 425
- Highway 4
- Highway 8
- Highway 35
- Highway 83
- Highway 133
- Highway 138
- Highway 144
- Highway 172
- Highway 277
- Highway 293
- Highway 530
- Highway 922
- Highway 980

== See also ==
- National Register of Historic Places listings in Drew County, Arkansas
