= Veasey-DeArmond House =

Historic house in Arkansas, United States

- U.S. National Register of Historic Places
- Location within Arkansas Location within the United States
- Nearest city: Lacey, Arkansas
- Coordinates: 33°30′41″N 91°51′31″W
- Area: 7 acres (2.8 ha)
- Built: 1850
- Architect: Abner Veasey
- Architectural style: Tidewater South Folk House
- NRHP reference No.: 89001424
- Added to NRHP: September 14, 1989

The Veasey-DeArmond House is a historic house on Arkansas Highway 81, south of Monticello, Arkansas, near Lacey. It is one of the county's finest vernacular Greek Revival houses. The single-story wood-frame house was built in the 1850s on land granted to Abner Veasey by President James Buchanan, and follows a roughly Georgian-style center hall plan with parlor. The front entry is framed by sidelight windows, with a transom above, and pilasters flanking the windows.

The house was listed on the National Register of Historic Places in 1989.

== See also ==
- National Register of Historic Places listings in Drew County, Arkansas
