= Saline Cemetery =

Historic cemetery in Arkansas, United States

- U.S. National Register of Historic Places
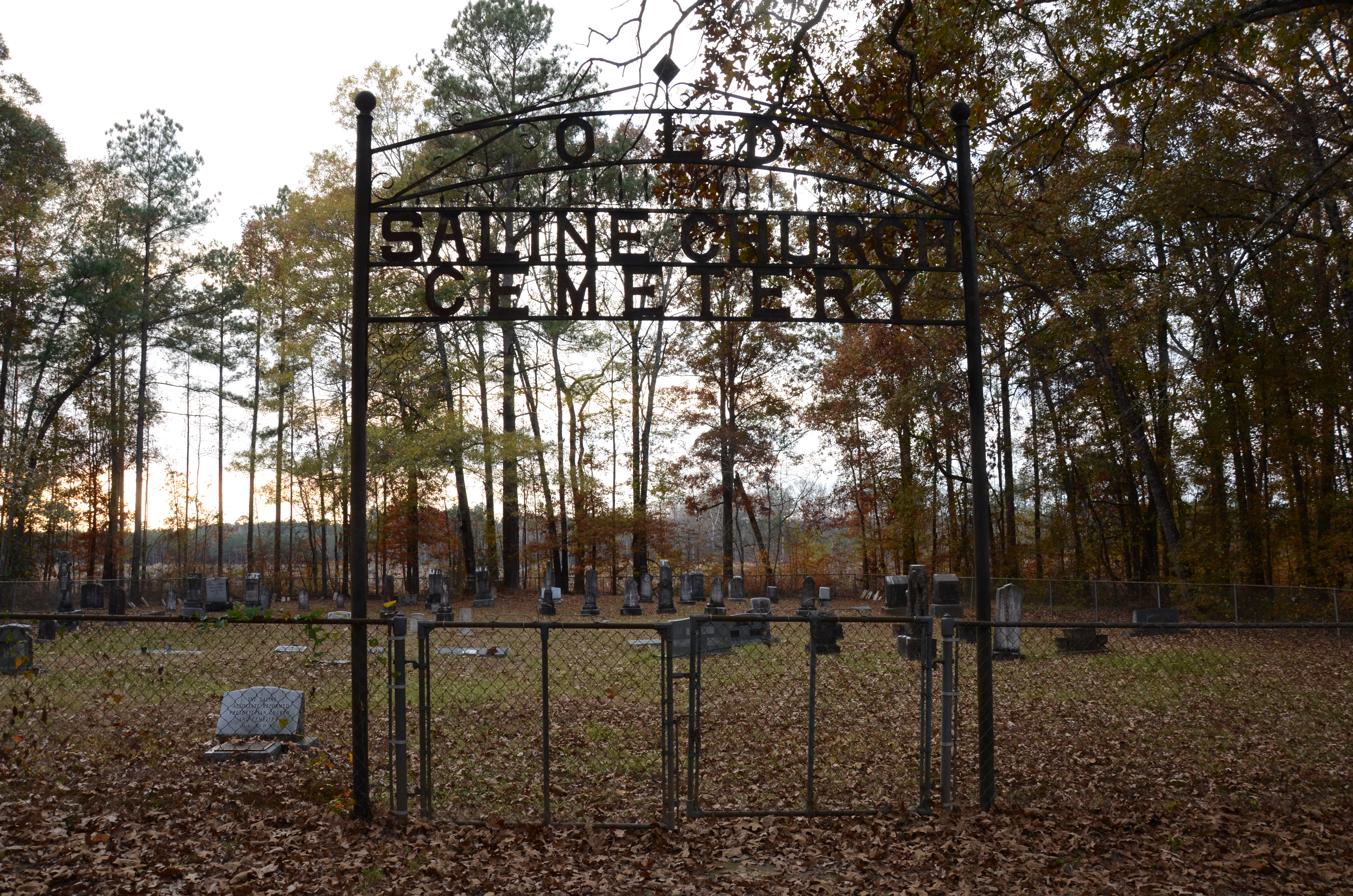

- Location within Arkansas Location within the United States
- Nearest city: Wilmar, Arkansas
- Coordinates: 33°37′11″N 91°54′30″W
- Area: 5 acres (2.0 ha)
- Built: 1878
- NRHP reference No.: 11000353
- Added to NRHP: June 15, 2011

The Saline Cemetery is one of the older cemeteries in Drew County, Arkansas. It is located about 1.5 miles (2.4 km) west of Wilmar on Allis Road, near the ghost town of Allis. The Allis area was settled in 1860, and local residents established the Saline Associate Reform Presbyterian Church the following year, and the cemetery was established on the church grounds. The oldest inscribed grave dates to 1878, and is that of a member of the Davis family, early settlers whose descendants continue to maintain the cemetery. A number of the area's early settlers are among the more than 100 graves in the cemetery.

The cemetery was listed on the National Register of Historic Places in 2011.

== See also ==
- National Register of Historic Places listings in Drew County, Arkansas
