= Monticello Confederate Monument =

- U.S. National Register of Historic Places
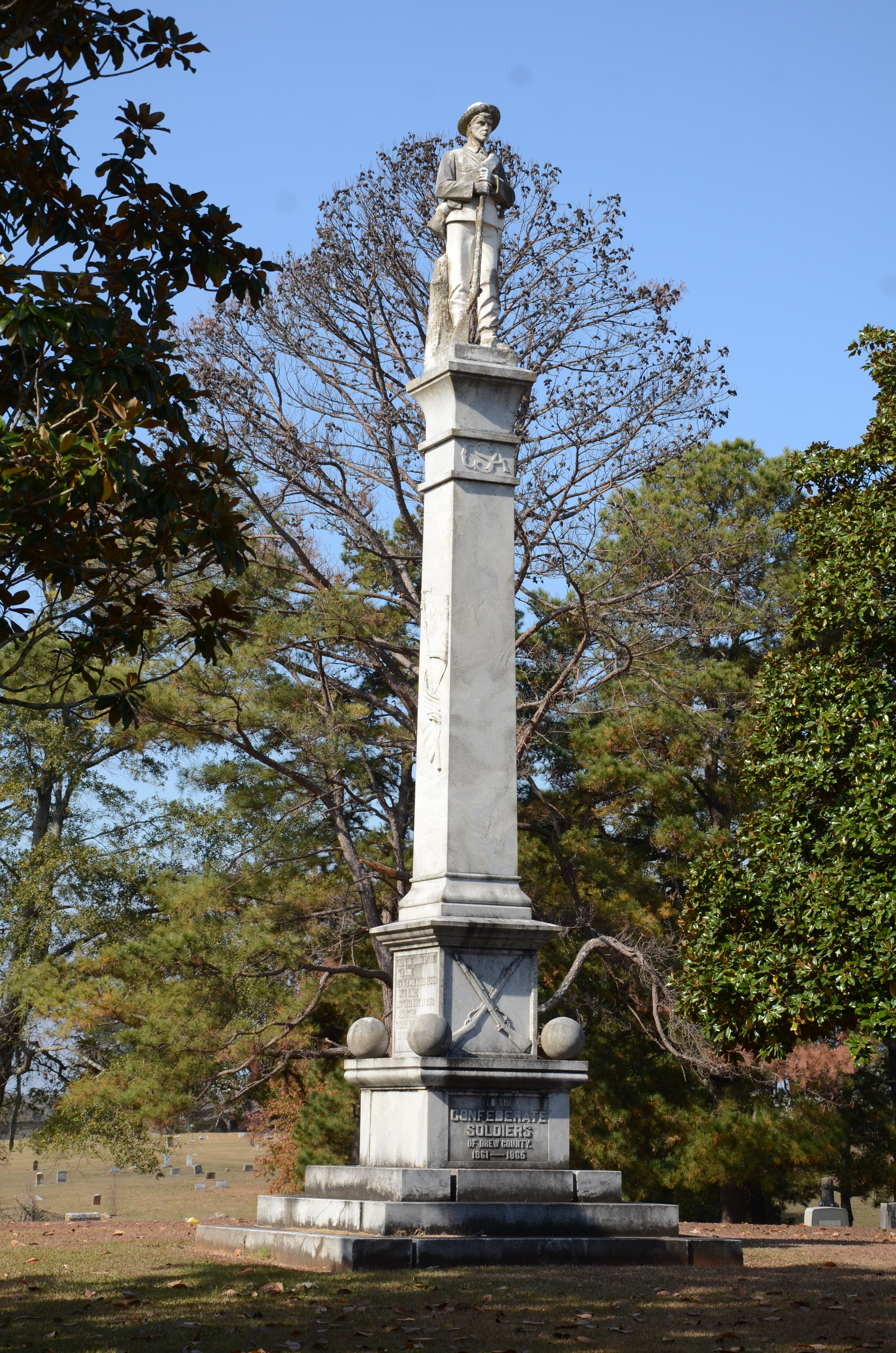

- Location within Arkansas Location within the United States
- Location: Oakland Cemetery, E of jct. of Oakland Ave. and Hyatt St., Monticello, Arkansas
- Coordinates: 33°38′4″N 91°47′52″W
- Area: less than one acre
- Built: 1915
- Architectural style: Classical Revival
- MPS: Civil War Commemorative Sculpture MPS
- NRHP reference No.: 96000449
- Added to NRHP: April 26, 1996

The Monticello Confederate Monument stands at the end of the main entrance road to the Oaklawn Cemetery in Monticello, Arkansas. It was dedicated in 1915 to the Confederate soldiers of Drew County who served in the American Civil War. The main sculpture, which is made of marble, depicts a uniformed Confederate soldier carrying a blanket roll, and wearing a scabbard. He stands with both hands on a rifle, whose butt end is on the ground. It measures 6 feet (1.8 m) tall and about 20 inches (51 cm) square, and stands on a marble base 20 feet (6.1 m) high. It is inscribed as follows:

- east side: CSA / TO THE / CONFEDERATE SOLDIERS / OF DREW COUNTY / 1861 - 1865
- north side: ERECTED BY THE / W. F. SLEMONS CHAPTER / U. D. C. / 1914
- south side, beneath a furled flag: FURL THAT BANNER! TRUE, / 'TIS GORY / YET, 'TIS WREATHED AROUND / WITH GLORY, / AND WILL LIVE IN SONG / AND STORY, / THOUGH IT'S FOLDS ARE IN THE DUST. / FATHER RYAN.
- west side, beneath crossed sabers: LEST / WE / FORGET

The monument was listed on the National Register of Historic Places in 1996.

== See also ==
- National Register of Historic Places listings in Drew County, Arkansas
