= Selma Rosenwald School =

- U.S. National Register of Historic Places
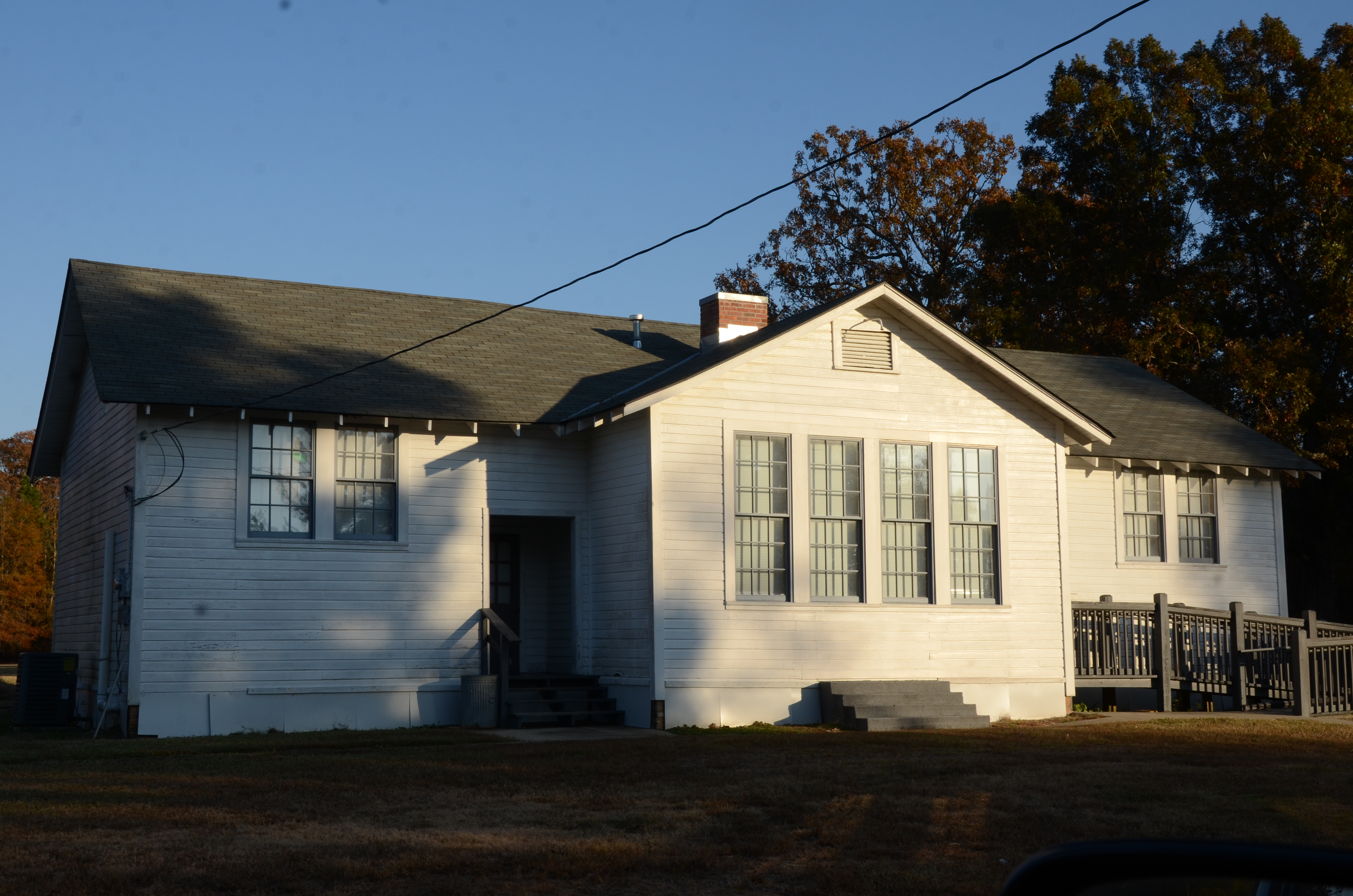

- Location within Arkansas Location within the United States
- Location: Selma-Collins Rd., approx. 0.25 mi. S of US 278, Selma, Arkansas
- Coordinates: 33°40′30″N 91°33′58″W
- Area: 4.3 acres (1.7 ha)
- Built: 1924
- Architect: Samuel Smith
- Architectural style: Plain traditional
- NRHP reference No.: 06000069
- Added to NRHP: March 2, 2006

The Selma Rosenwald School is a historic school building, just south of US Route 278 on the Selma-Collins Road in Selma, Arkansas. Built in 1924 with funds provided by philanthropist Julius Rosenwald, it is the only surviving Rosenwald School in Drew County. It is a single story wood-frame building with two classrooms. The building was used as a school, serving grades 1 through 10, until 1964. It was then acquired by the local Masonic Lodge.

The building was listed on the National Register of Historic Places in 2006.

== See also ==
- National Register of Historic Places listings in Drew County, Arkansas
