= Rough and Ready Cemetery =

Historic cemetery in Drew County, Arkansas

- U.S. National Register of Historic Places
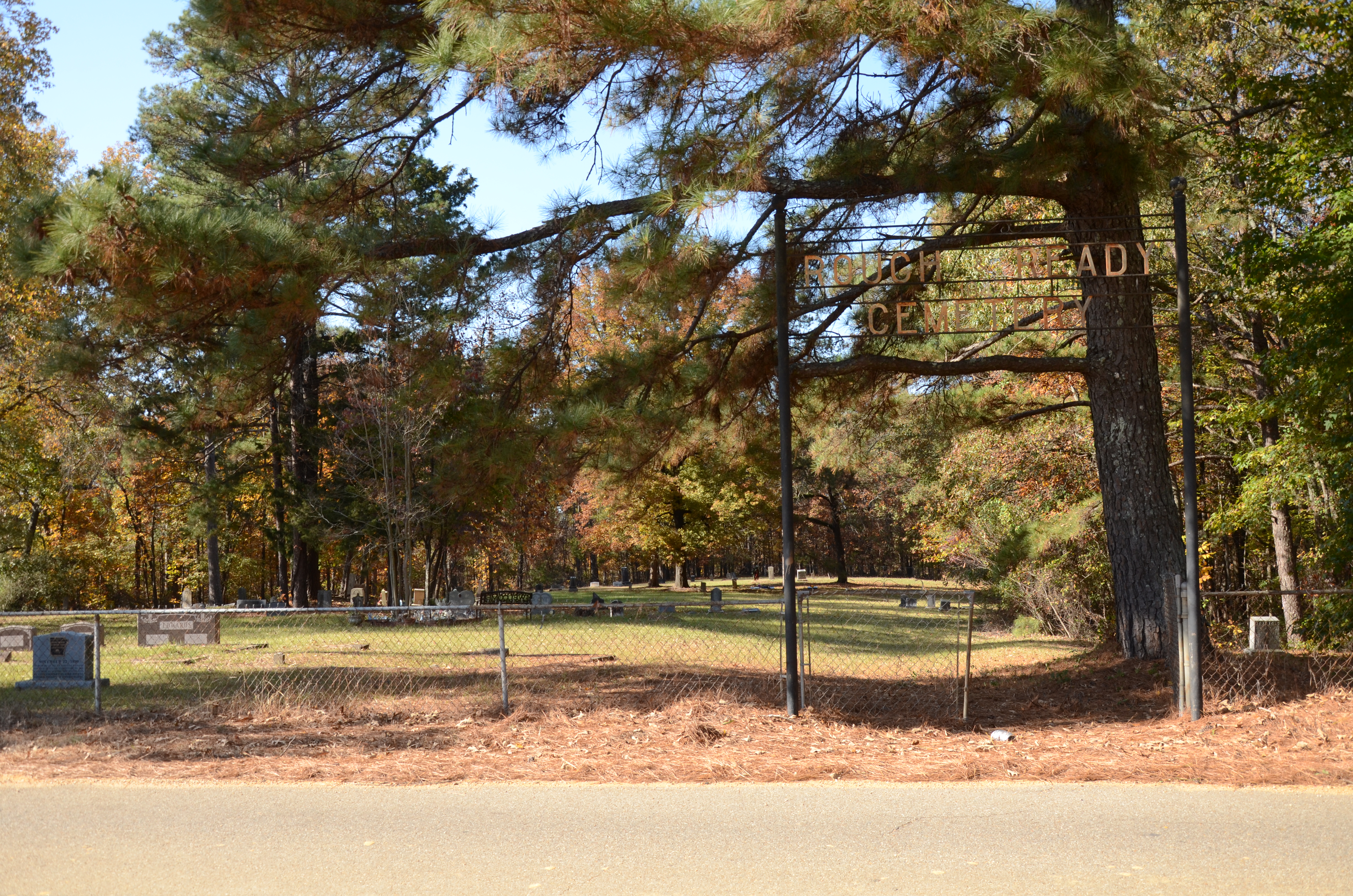

- Location within Arkansas Location within the United States
- Nearest city: Monticello, Arkansas
- Coordinates: 33°36′29.9″N 91°47′21.1″W
- Area: 1.7 acres (0.69 ha)
- Built: 1843
- NRHP reference No.: 99001376
- Added to NRHP: November 22, 1999

The Rough and Ready Cemetery is a cemetery in Drew County, Arkansas. It is located about 1 mile (1.6 km) south of the Monticello Civic Center on State School Road. It is located near the site of the village of Rough and Ready, which was one of the first settlements in Drew County and served as its first county seat, and is its only known surviving feature. The oldest known grave dates to 1847, although the oldest dated marker is marked 1860. A number of the county's early settlers are among the more than 200 graves in the cemetery.

The cemetery was listed on the National Register of Historic Places in 1999.

== See also ==
- National Register of Historic Places listings in Drew County, Arkansas
