= Montongo, Arkansas =

Unincorporated community in Arkansas, United States

- Unincorporated community
- Location within Arkansas Location within the United States
- Coordinates: 33°44′35″N 91°49′20″W
- Country: United States
- State: Arkansas
- County: Drew
- Elevation: 384 ft (117 m)
- Time zone: UTC-6 (Central (CST))
  - Summer (DST): UTC-5 (CDT)
- Area code: 870
- GNIS feature ID: 79042

Montongo is an unincorporated community in Drew County, Arkansas, United States. Montongo is located on U.S. Route 425, 8.1 miles (13.0 km) north-northwest of Monticello.
