= Tennessee, Arkansas =

Unincorporated community in Arkansas, United States

- Unincorporated community
- Location within Arkansas Location within the United States
- Coordinates: 33°37′52″N 91°50′55″W
- Country: United States
- State: Arkansas
- County: Drew
- Elevation: 240 ft (73 m)
- Time zone: UTC-6 (Central (CST))
  - Summer (DST): UTC-5 (CDT)
- Area code: 870
- GNIS feature ID: 79098

Tennessee is an unincorporated community in Marion Township, Drew County, Arkansas, United States. Tennessee is located on U.S. Route 278 west of Monticello.
