= Taylor Log House and Site =

Historic house in Arkansas, United States

- U.S. National Register of Historic Places
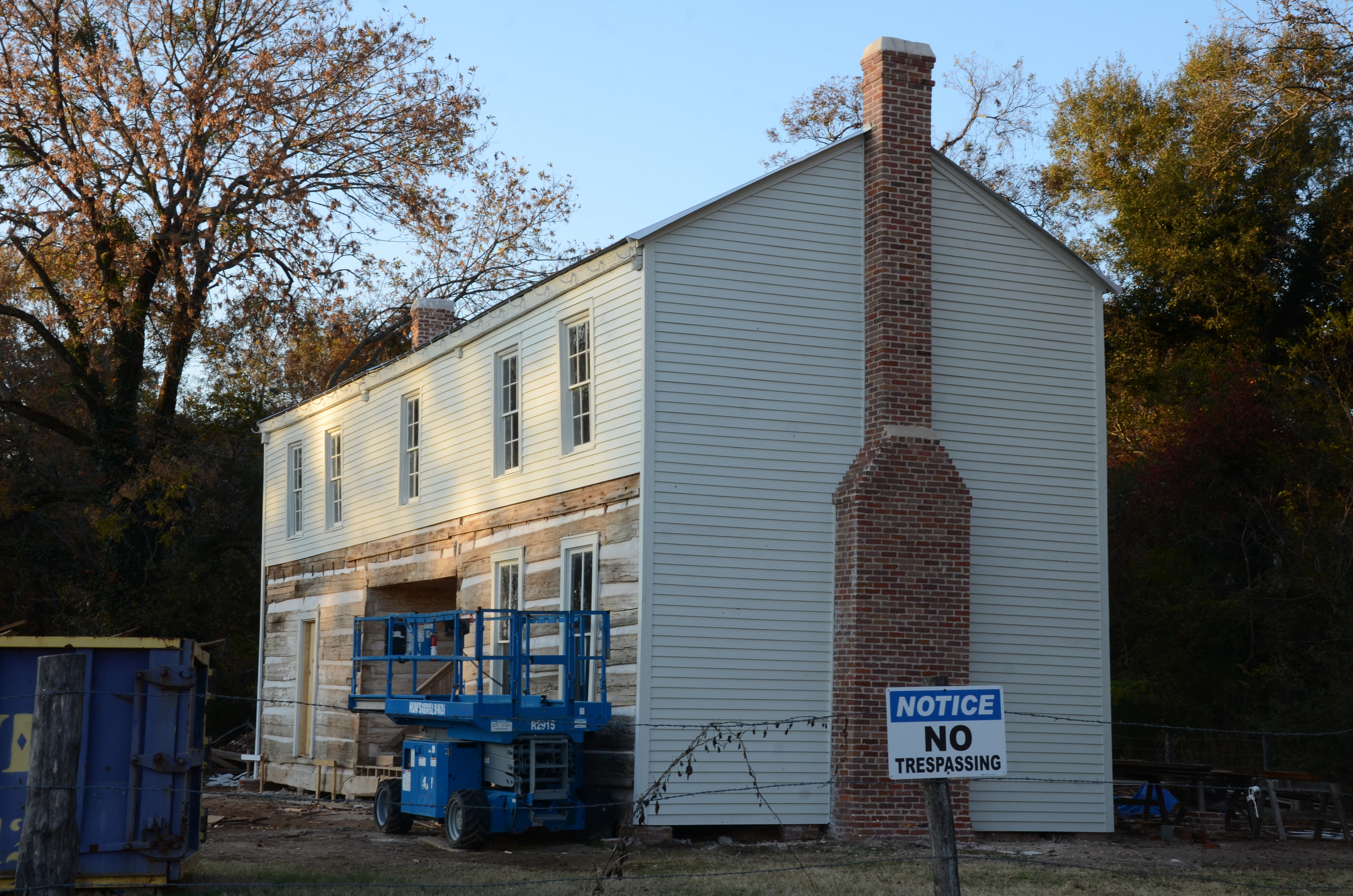

- Location within Arkansas Location within the United States
- Nearest city: Winchester, Arkansas
- Coordinates: 33°46′11″N 91°33′4″W
- Area: 4 acres (1.6 ha)
- Built: 1846
- Architectural style: Dogtrot
- NRHP reference No.: 95001168
- Added to NRHP: October 16, 1995

The Taylor Log House and Site is a historic plantation site on Arkansas Highway 138 in rural Drew County, Arkansas, near the town of Winchester. Included on the plantation site is the best-preserved dog trot house in Arkansas's Lower Delta region. The Taylor Log House, a two-story dog trot built out of cypress logs, was built in 1846 by John Martin Taylor, a Kentucky native who established a plantation on the banks of Bayou Bartholomew. The building was moved, probably in the 1880s. In addition to the house, the site is believed to include archeologically significant remnants of a wide variety of outbuildings. The site was the subject of archeological activities in the 1990s.

The site was listed on the National Register of Historic Places in 1995.

== See also ==
- National Register of Historic Places listings in Drew County, Arkansas
