= Champ Grubbs House =

Historic house in Arkansas, United States

- U.S. National Register of Historic Places
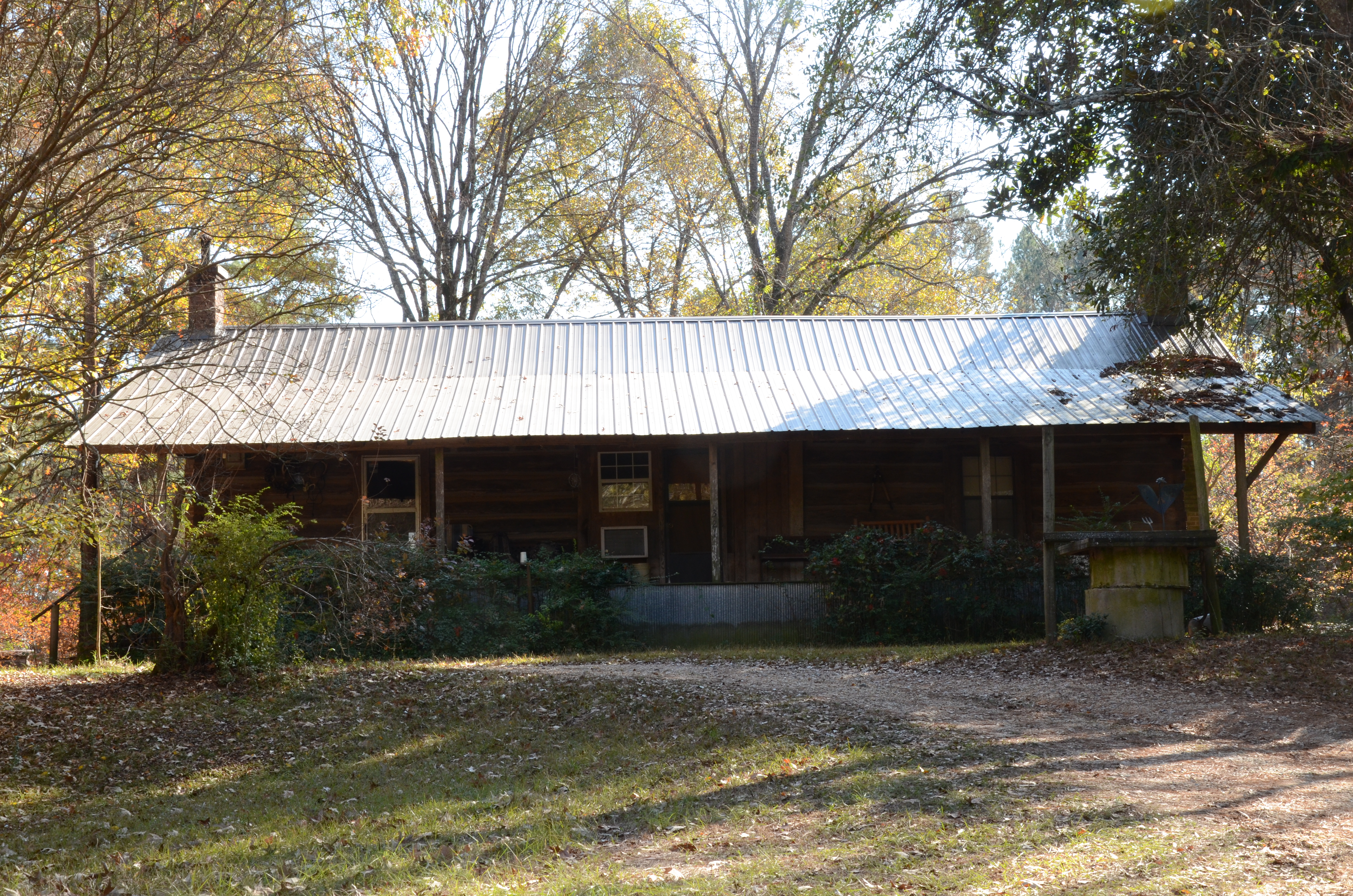

- Location within Arkansas Location within the United States
- Nearest city: New Hope, Drew County, Arkansas
- Coordinates: 33°30′46″N 91°56′3″W
- Area: less than one acre
- Built: 1859
- Built by: Stephen H. Grubbs
- Architectural style: Dogtrot house
- NRHP reference No.: 92001619
- Added to NRHP: November 20, 1992

The Champ Grubbs House is a historic antebellum dog trot log cabin in rural Drew County, Arkansas. It is located on Ozment Bluff Road (now County Road 141), west of Arkansas Highway 172 and southwest of the county seat of Monticello. The single story log structure is estimated to have been built in 1859, and is one of the few such surviving buildings in the county. It was originally built to a typical dogtrot plan, although separate shed roof rooms were added to its rear in the 19th century, though these were removed and replaced with a similar addition in the 1980s. The center of the dog trot has been enclosed, and is accessed via a door from the front. The eastern log bay also functions as an entry, while that on the west side has been converted to a window. In much of the interior the log finish has been covered by paneling.

The house was listed on the National Register of Historic Places in 1992. It is named for Elisha Champion Grubb, a longtime justice of the peace in the area, although it is probable his father Stephen built the house. It remains in Grubb family hands.

== See also ==
- National Register of Historic Places listings in Drew County, Arkansas
