= Robert Lee Hardy House =

Historic house in Arkansas, United States

- U.S. National Register of Historic Places
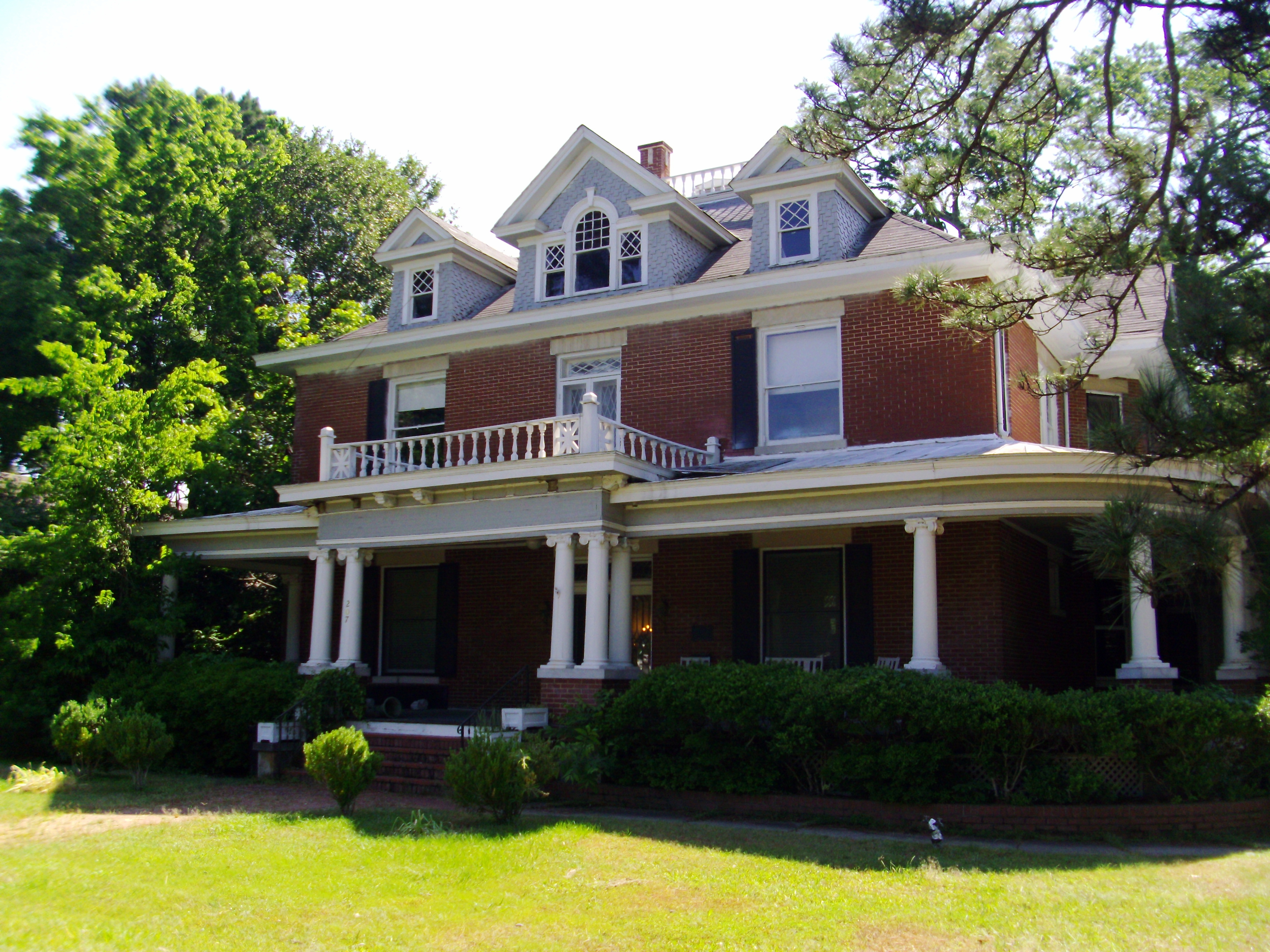

- Location within Arkansas Location within the United States
- Location: 207 S. Main St., Monticello, Arkansas
- Coordinates: 33°37′36″N 91°47′26″W
- Area: less than one acre
- Built: 1908
- Architect: George Franklin Barber
- Architectural style: Colonial Revival, Queen Anne
- NRHP reference No.: 82002113
- Added to NRHP: April 26, 1982

The Robert Lee Hardy House is a historic house at 207 South Main Street in Monticello, Arkansas. It was designed for Robert Lee Hardy, a prominent local lawyer, by Knoxville, Tennessee-based architect George Franklin Barber, and built c. 1908–1909, at a time when Monticello was a thriving commercial center. It is unusual for its construction material (brick), and for its elaborate yet restrained Classical and Colonial Revival styling.

The house was listed on the National Register of Historic Places in 1982.

== See also ==
- National Register of Historic Places listings in Drew County, Arkansas
