= Monticello Commercial Historic District =

Historic district in Arkansas, United States

- U.S. National Register of Historic Places
- U.S. Historic district
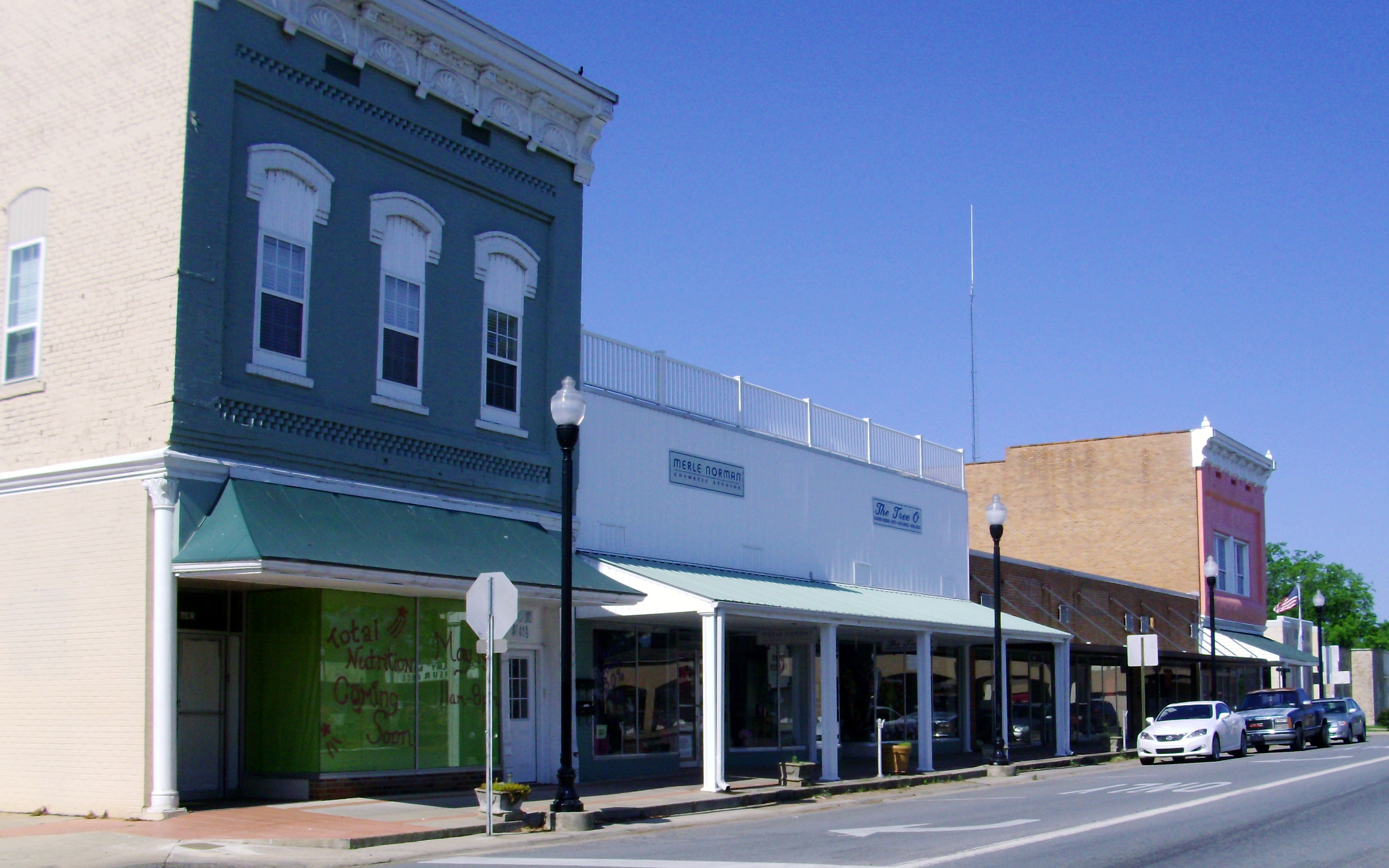

- Location within Arkansas Location within the United States
- Location: Bounded roughly by Trotter Ave., Edwards St., Railroad Ave. & Chester St., Monticello, Arkansas
- Coordinates: 33.62902°N 91.79087°W
- Area: 13 acres (5.3 ha)
- Architect: Multiple
- Architectural style: Italianate, Moderne
- NRHP reference No.: 11000688
- Added to NRHP: September 23, 2011

The Monticello Commercial Historic District encompasses a portion of the historic business district of Monticello, the seat of Drew County, Arkansas. The district was listed on the National Register of Historic Places in 2011.

Monticello was laid out in the 1850s, but none of its early commercial buildings have survived. The oldest buildings date from the 1890s to c. 1912, and were built around the square that then housed the county courthouse, and which now is an open grassy park. The city blocks abutting the park north and west have been redeveloped, and are not a part of the district. Buildings along the park's south and east side (North Main Street and West Gaines Street), and extending east from their (along East Gaines Street and East McCloy Street), date for the most part from the 1890s to 1961, although many buildings have since been altered to some degree. Most of the buildings were built between 1921 and 1961.

Many of the buildings in the district are joined in rows by party walls. They were built of brick, and are stylistically vernacular. Notable exceptions are the Art Deco Post Office (separately listed on the National Register), a Moderne-style building on North Main Street, and the five story Mediterranean Revival Ridgeway Hotel (also separately listed), which is also the district's tallest building. The two most architecturally elaborate buildings are 202 and 204 North Main Street, Italianate structures built c. 1900.

The district has seen some alteration in recent years, and some period buildings do not contribute as a consequence. The double building at 103–107 North Bailey, for instance, is a single-story early-20th-century brick building which has had facade alterations made that are not sympathetic to its character. A building of similar age at 120 North Main has been slip-covered in metal.

== See also ==
- National Register of Historic Places listings in Drew County, Arkansas
