= Bearhouse Township, Drew County, Arkansas =

Bearhouse Township
- Township
- Location in Arkansas Bearhouse Township (the United States)
- Coordinates: 33°27′16″N 91°41′48″W
- Country: United States
- State: Arkansas
- County: Drew

Area
  - Total: 59.160 sq mi (153.22 km^{2})
  - Land: 59.156 sq mi (153.21 km^{2})
  - Water: 0.004 sq mi (0.010 km^{2})
- Elevation: 187 ft (57 m)

Population (2010)
  - Total: 38
  - Density: 0.64/sq mi (0.25/km^{2})
- Time zone: UTC-6 (CST)
  - Summer (DST): UTC-5 (CDT)
- FIPS code: 05-90186
- GNIS ID: 66509

Bearhouse Township is a township in Drew County, Arkansas, United States. Its total population was 38 as of the 2010 United States census, an increase of 15.15 percent from 33 at the 2000 census.

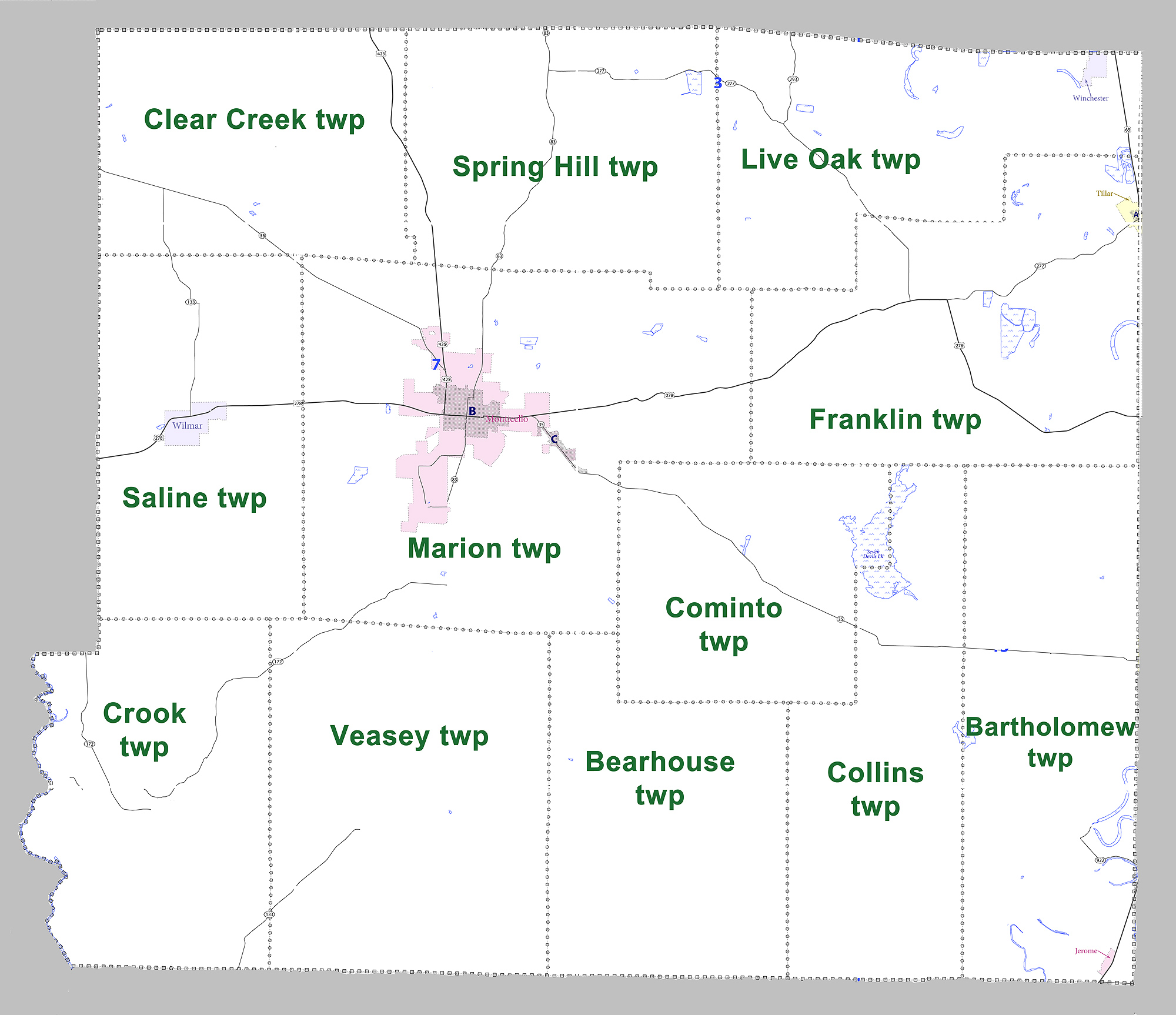
Townships in Drew County as of 2010

According to the 2010 Census, Bearhouse Township is located at 33°27′16″N 91°41′48″W (33.454555, -91.696699). It has a total area of 59.160 square miles (153.22 square kilometers), of which 59.156 sq mi (153.21 km^{2}) is land and 0.004 sq mi (0.010 km^{2}) is water (0.01%). As per the USGS National Elevation Dataset, the elevation is 187 feet (57 m).
