= Jerome Elementary School No. 22 =

- U.S. National Register of Historic Places
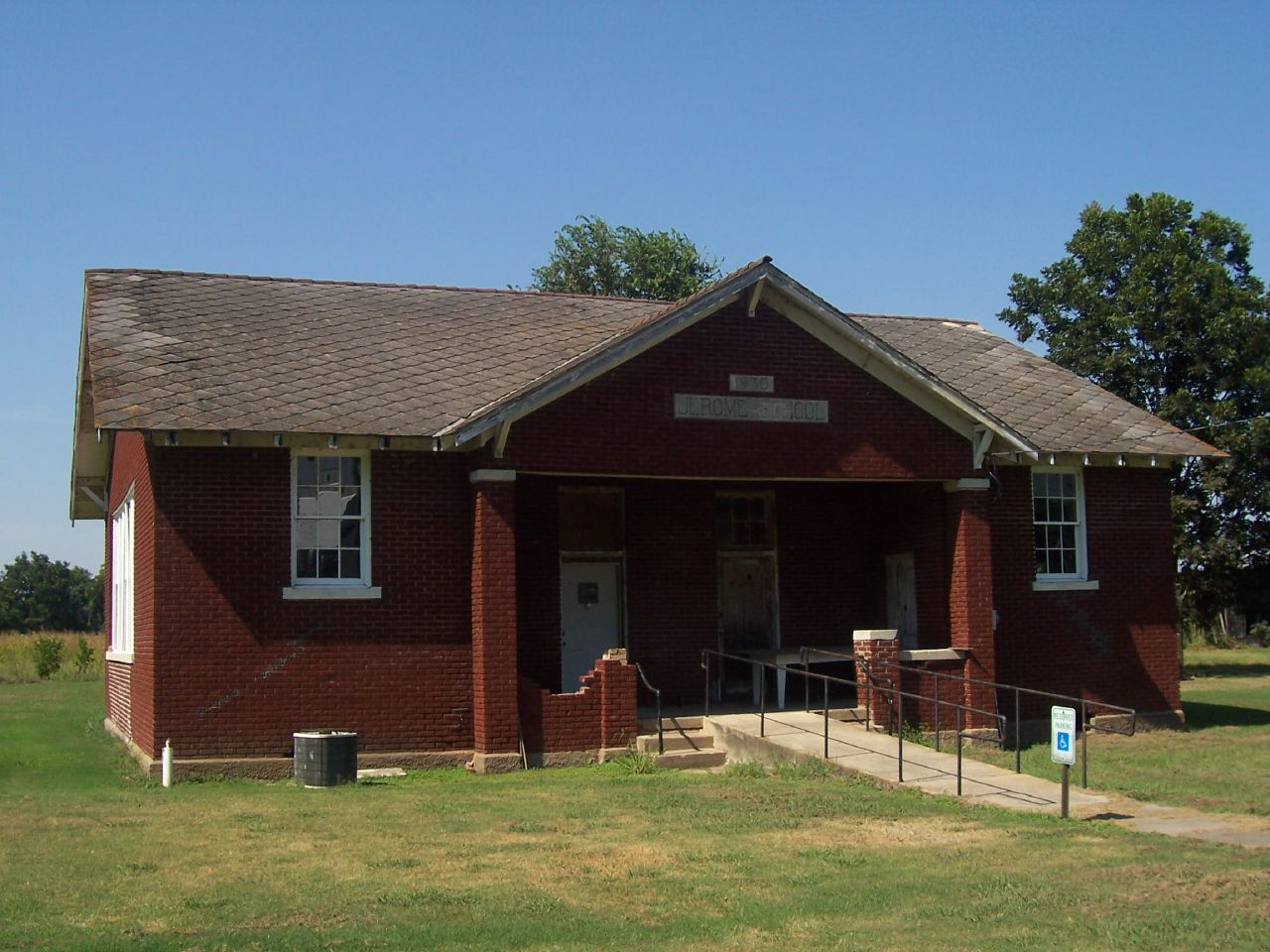

- Location within Arkansas Location within the United States
- Location: N. Louisiana Blvd., Jerome, Arkansas
- Coordinates: 33°24′11″N 91°28′8″W
- Area: 2.5 acres (1.0 ha)
- Built: 1930
- Architectural style: Bungalow/craftsman
- NRHP reference No.: 05001068
- Added to NRHP: September 28, 2005

The Jerome Elementary School No. 22 is a historic school building on North Louisiana Boulevard in Jerome, Arkansas. The single-story brick building was constructed in 1930, at a time when Jerome was a thriving logging and farming town. It was used as a school until 1950, when Jerome's schools were consolidated with nearby Dermott. It sat vacant and deteriorating until it was sold in 1970 to a citizens' group, which rehabilitated the building for other civic purposes.

The building was listed on the National Register of Historic Places in 2005.

== See also ==
- National Register of Historic Places listings in Drew County, Arkansas
