= Selma Methodist Church =

Historic church in Arkansas, United States

- U.S. National Register of Historic Places
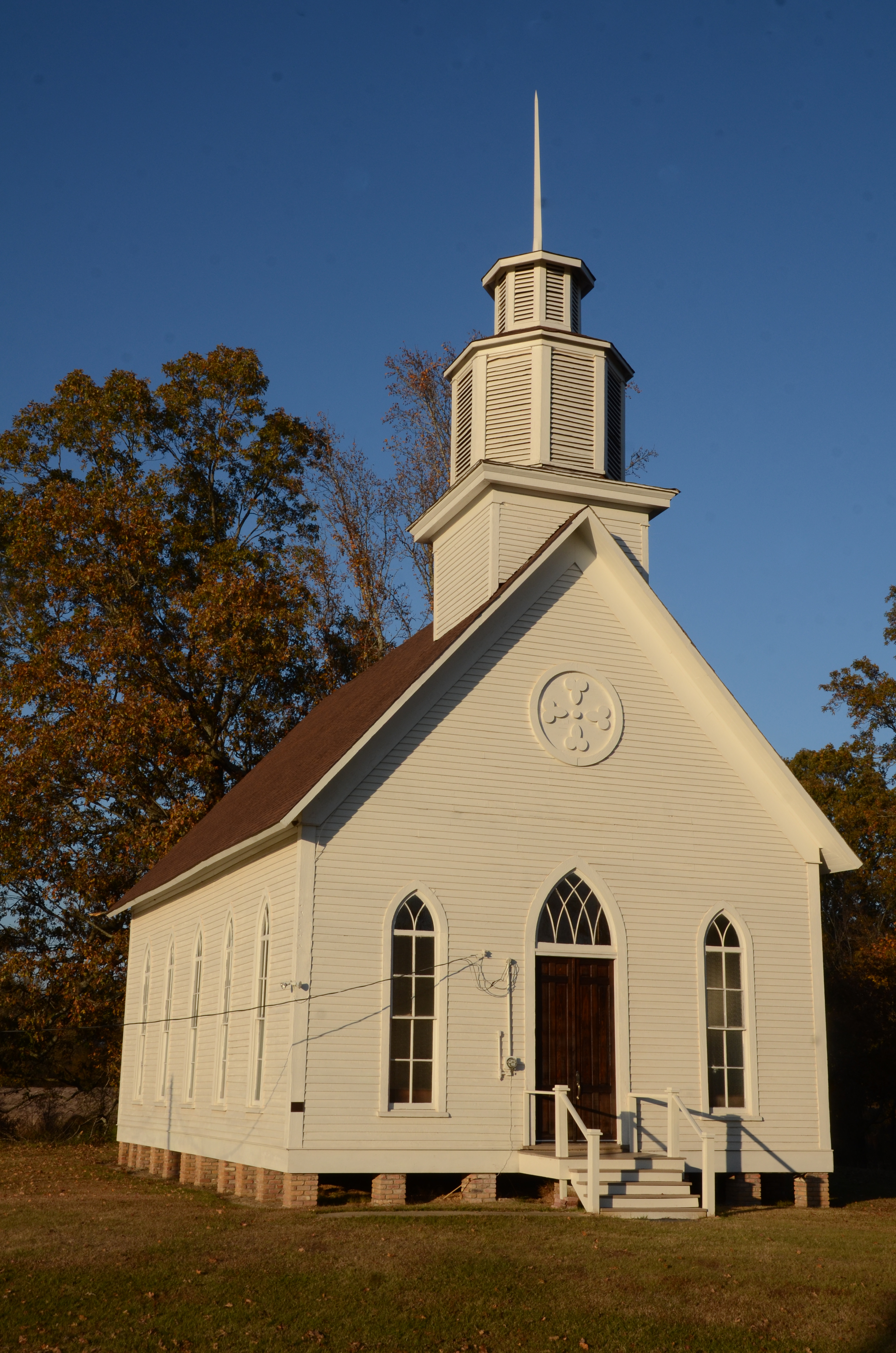

- Location within Arkansas Location within the United States
- Location: AR 293, Selma, Arkansas
- Coordinates: 33°41′52″N 91°34′11″W
- Area: less than one acre
- Architectural style: Gothic Revival
- NRHP reference No.: 72000202
- Added to NRHP: September 22, 1972

The Selma Methodist Church is a historic church located along AR 293 in Selma, Arkansas. The wood-frame church was built c. 1874, and is a well preserved rural Gothic Revival structure. Its main facade has narrow Gothic windows with pointed arches flanking the center entry, which is topped by a similarly pointed transom. The side walls have five windows each, matching those on the main facade. The apse is located in a half-octagon bay on the north side, whose two windows are also like the others, only shorter. The main entrance is topped by a small octagonal bell chamber mounted on a square base; there is no steeple.

The building was originally built for a Baptist congregation, which shared the building with the local Methodists after the latter's church was destroyed by fire. The Methodists acquired the building in 1885. The congregation was closed by the United Methodist Church in 1992.

It was built in a Gothic Revival style and was added to the National Register in 1972.

== See also ==
- National Register of Historic Places listings in Drew County, Arkansas
