= Garvin Cavaness House =

Historic house in Arkansas, United States

- U.S. National Register of Historic Places

- Location within Arkansas Location within the United States
- Location: 404 S. Main Street, Monticello, Arkansas
- Coordinates: 33°37′22″N 91°47′30″W
- Area: less than one acre
- Built: 1906
- Built by: Garvin Cavaness
- Architectural style: Colonial Revival, Classical Revival
- NRHP reference No.: 80000775
- Added to NRHP: May 23, 1980

The Garvin Cavaness House (now the Drew County Historical Museum) is a historic house at 404 South Main Street in Monticello, Arkansas. The house was built over a ten-year period, 1906–1916, by Garvin Cavaness, descendant of early settlers of Drew County. The 2 1/2-story building is built of concrete blocks that were custom-molded on site by Cavaness, reputedly using cement he recovered when hired to clean up spilled cement from derailed railroad cars.

== Description and history ==
The house Cavaness built has significant Classical Revival styling. Its main facade is dominated by a two-story portico supported by six concrete Ionic columns and topped by a relatively unadorned pediment. Granite steps lead up to the central bay, where the entry is flanked by sidelights and topped by a fanlight, all composed of bevel-edged leaded glass. The two outer bays of the front facade are set slightly back, and there are stairs descending from the porch down to the grounds at the ends. The building is capped by a hip roof made of tin shingles, whose front elevation is pierced by three gable dormers, the central one slightly larger than those flanking it. Each dormer has a round window above a line of small square windows. The side elevations are three bays, styled similarly to the front, including the portico, which wraps around on both sides. The back of the house has an asymmetrical L shape, where one bay has a two-story extension. The porch on this side has been screened, and partially enclosed by later alteration.

In the 1920s the house was divided into apartments, and some elements of its interior decoration were lost. It was listed on the National Register of Historic Places on May 23, 1980.

== Historical Society ==
The Drew County Historical Society was organized in June 1959. The building was acquired by the Drew County Historical Society in 1969 and became the Drew county Historical Museum. The Peter Rives home, one of the oldest log cabins in the county, and the Stephen Gaster smokehouse, were moved to the grounds and the museum opened to the public in 1971. The Southeast Arkansas Regional Archives opened at the museum in 1976.

== See also ==
- National Register of Historic Places listings in Drew County, Arkansas
