= Tillar, Arkansas =

- Town
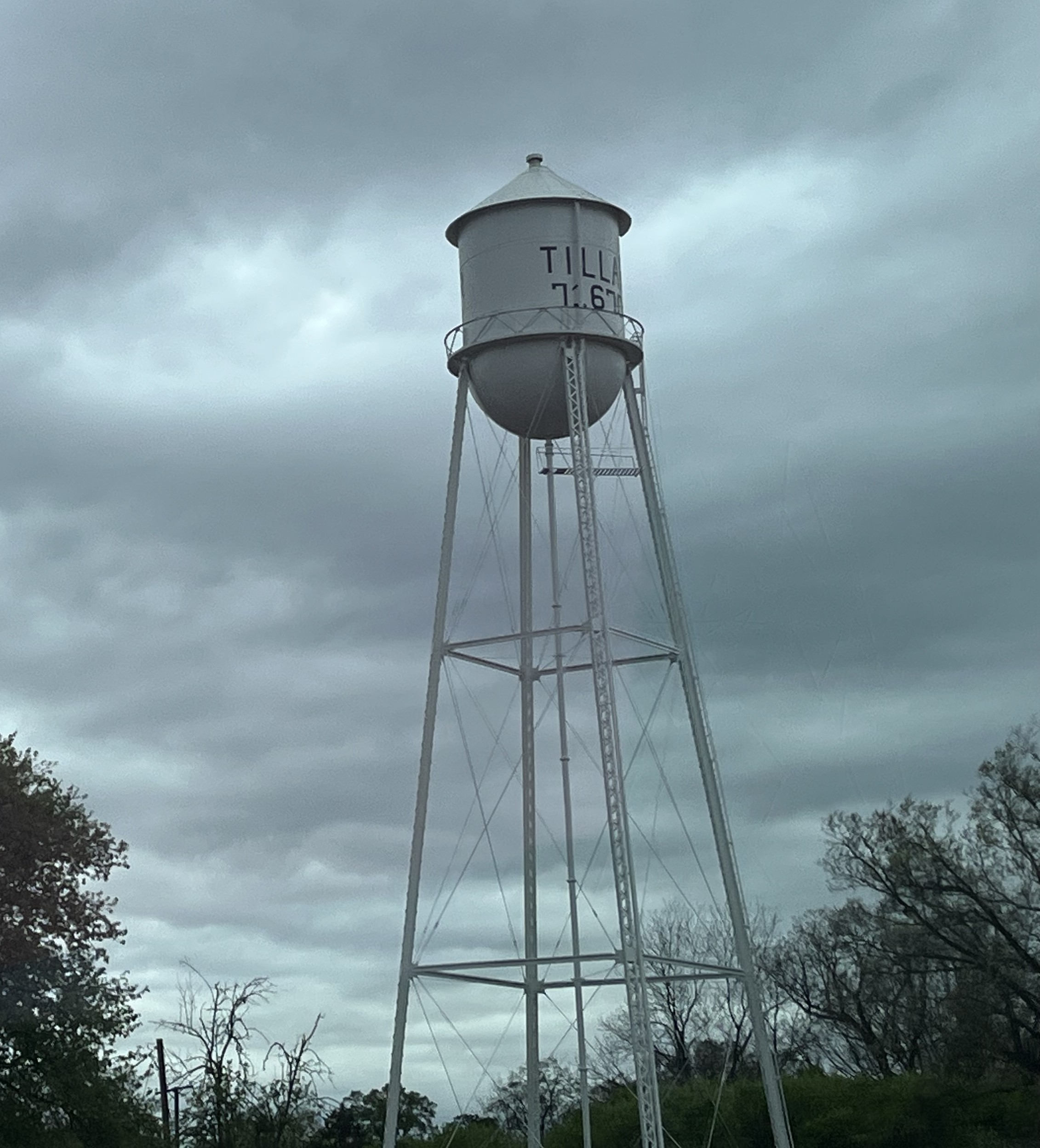
- Tillar Water Tower

- Location of Tillar in Desha County and Drew County, Arkansas
- Coordinates: 33°42′40″N 91°27′07″W
- Country: United States
- State: Arkansas
- Counties: Drew, Desha

Area
  - Total: 0.78 sq mi (2.03 km^{2})
  - Land: 0.78 sq mi (2.03 km^{2})
  - Water: 0 sq mi (0.00 km^{2})
- Elevation: 148 ft (45 m)

Population (2020)
  - Total: 172
  - Estimate (2025): 160 ▼
  - Density: 219.2/sq mi (84.62/km^{2})
- Time zone: UTC-6 (Central (CST))
  - Summer (DST): UTC-5 (CDT)
- ZIP code: 71670
- Area code: 870
- FIPS code: 05-69230
- GNIS feature ID: 2405591

Tillar is a town in Desha and Drew counties in the U.S. state of Arkansas. The population was 172 at the 2020 census. The area west of it was known as Tillar Station. Frank Tillar Memorial Methodist Episcopal Church, South is listed on the National Register of Historic Places.

== Geography ==
According to the United States Census Bureau, the city has a total area of 0.7 square miles (1.8 km^{2}), all land.

== Demographics ==
Historical population
Census	Pop.	Note	%±
1910	180		—
1920	350		94.4%
1930	267		−23.7%
1940	229		−14.2%
1950	239		4.4%
1960	232		−2.9%
1970	293		26.3%
1980	280		−4.4%
1990	221		−21.1%
2000	240		8.6%
2010	225		−6.2%
2020	172		−23.6%
2025 (est.)	160	▼	−7.0%
U.S. Decennial Census

As of the census of 2000, there were 240 people, 99 households, and 75 families residing in the city. The population density was 325.9 inhabitants per square mile (125.8/km^{2}). There were 110 housing units at an average density of 149.4 per square mile (57.7/km^{2}). The racial makeup of the city was 91.67% White, 5.83% Black or African American, 0.42% Native American, 1.25% from other races, and 0.83% from two or more races. 4.58% of the population were Hispanic or Latino of any race.

There were 99 households, out of which 30.3% had children under the age of 18 living with them, 64.6% were married couples living together, 6.1% had a female householder with no husband present, and 24.2% were non-families. 21.2% of all households were made up of individuals, and 14.1% had someone living alone who was 65 years of age or older. The average household size was 2.42 and the average family size was 2.79.

In the city the population was spread out, with 21.3% under the age of 18, 12.1% from 18 to 24, 26.3% from 25 to 44, 22.5% from 45 to 64, and 17.9% who were 65 years of age or older. The median age was 42 years. For every 100 females, there were 98.3 males. For every 100 females age 18 and over, there were 94.8 males.

The median income for a household in the city was $29,792, and the median income for a family was $34,821. Males had a median income of $23,929 versus $22,500 for females. The per capita income for the city was $13,568. About 13.4% of families and 16.5% of the population were below the poverty line, including 16.7% of those under the age of eighteen and 19.0% of those 65 or over.

== Education ==
Its school district is the McGehee School District.

Formerly the Desha-Drew School District operated the B. C. Prewitt Memorial Elementary and Junior High School in Tillar. It also operated a school called Tillar School. On July 1, 1993, the Desha-Drew district was disestablished, with some territory given to the McGehee School District.

There is a Christian school in Tillar, called Cornerstone Christian Academy.

== Notable people ==
- Mark D. McElroy, Arkansas state representative, resides in Tillar
- Charlotte Tillar Schexnayder (1923–2020), member of the Arkansas House of Representatives 1985–1999
