= Tillar Methodist Church =

Historic church in Arkansas, United States

- Frank Tillar Memorial Methodist Episcopal Church, South
- U.S. National Register of Historic Places
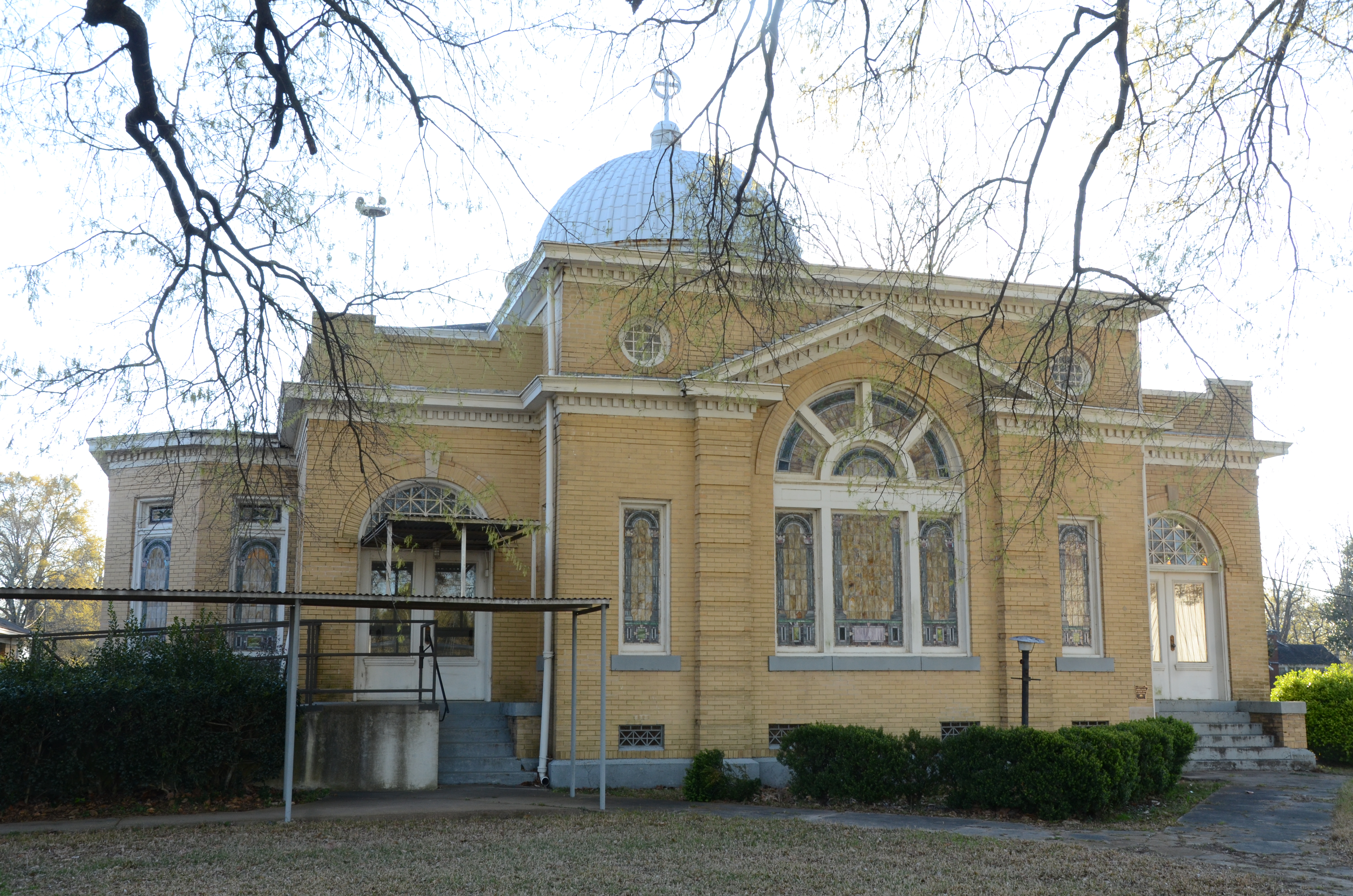

- Location within Arkansas Location within the United States
- Location: W. Railroad St., N of AR 277, Tillar, Arkansas
- Coordinates: 33°42′37″N 91°27′13″W
- Area: less than one acre
- Built: 1913
- Architect: Monk and Ritchie
- Architectural style: Classical Revival
- NRHP reference No.: 97000525
- Added to NRHP: June 4, 1997

The Tillar Methodist Church, formerly known as the Frank Tillar Memorial Methodist Episcopal Church, South and the Tillar United Methodist Church, is a historic church building on West Railroad Street in Tillar, Arkansas. The church, a 1 1/2 story brick Classical Revival building, was built in 1913 by the Pine Bluff firm of Monk and Ritchie. Its most distinctive feature is its central dome, which is mounted above a band of windows. The church is named in honor of the congregant who donated $8,000 of the $8,500 cost of its construction.

The church was listed on the National Register of Historic Places in 1997. In 2023, the congregation disaffiliated from the United Methodist Church and joined the Global Methodist Church.

== See also ==
- National Register of Historic Places listings in Drew County, Arkansas
