= St. Mary's Episcopal Church (Monticello, Arkansas) =

Historic church in Arkansas, United States

- U.S. National Register of Historic Places
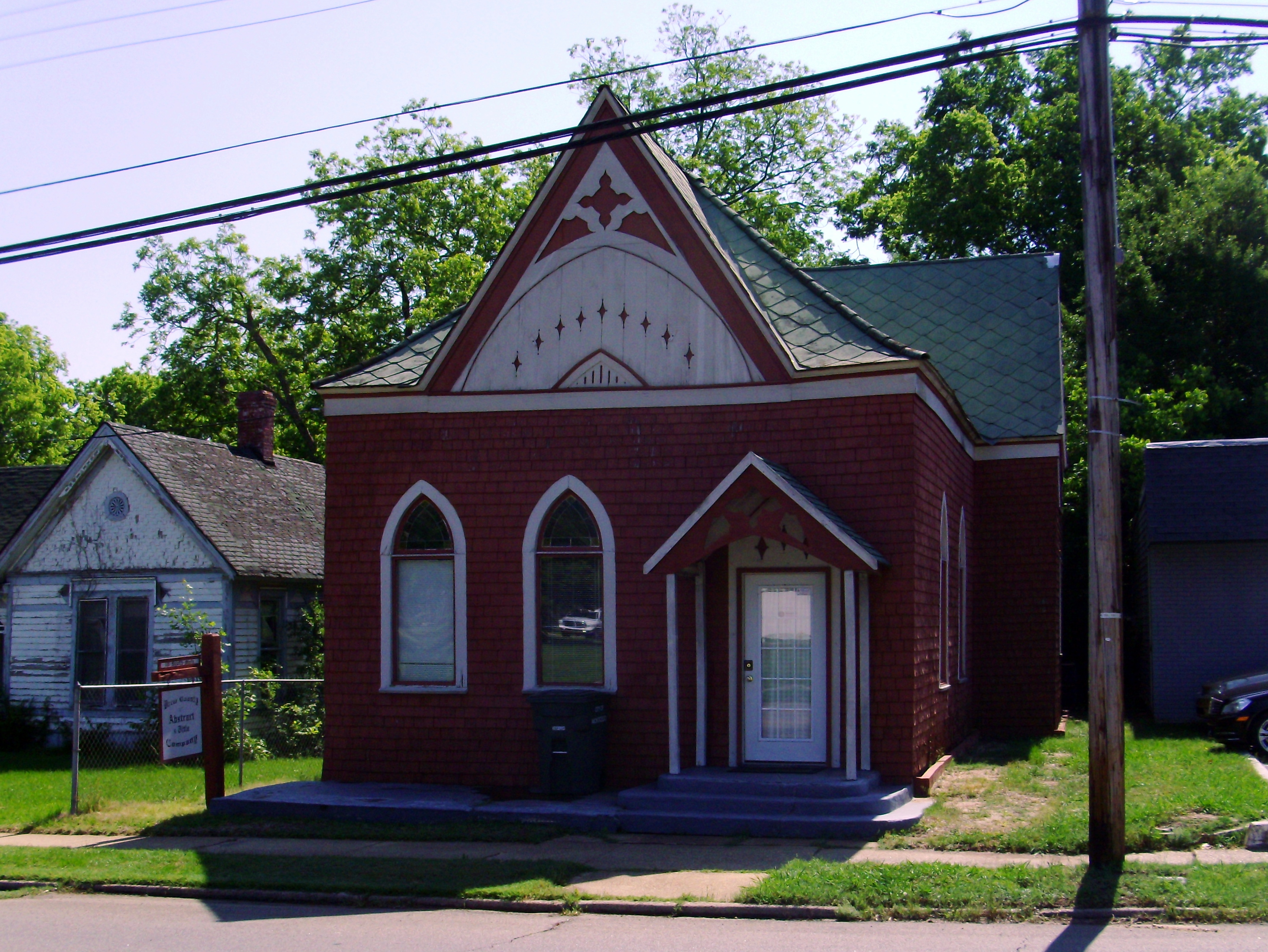

- Location within Arkansas Location within the United States
- Location: 115 S. Main St., Monticello, Arkansas
- Coordinates: 33°37′39″N 91°47′26″W
- Area: less than one acre
- Built: 1906
- Architectural style: Late Gothic Revival
- NRHP reference No.: 96000352
- Added to NRHP: April 4, 1996

St. Mary's Episcopal Church is a historic church at 115 S. Main Street in Monticello, Arkansas. The modest 1 1/2-story wood-frame Gothic Revival structure was built in 1906. When built it had a castellated tower, but this was removed at an unknown date. Because of declining participation, the Episcopal Church sold it in 1938 to Victor Borchardt, who operated a radio and appliance repair business there, making numerous alterations to the building. Changes made included the removal of Gothic-style lancet windows, a gabled front porch, and the introduction of a mezzanine and second floor in portions of the building.

The church was extensively restored in 1995. and listed on the National Register of Historic Places the following year.

The former congregation was part of the Episcopal Diocese of Arkansas.

== See also ==
- National Register of Historic Places listings in Drew County, Arkansas
