= Monticello North Main Street Historic District =

Historic district in Arkansas, United States

- U.S. National Register of Historic Places
- U.S. Historic district
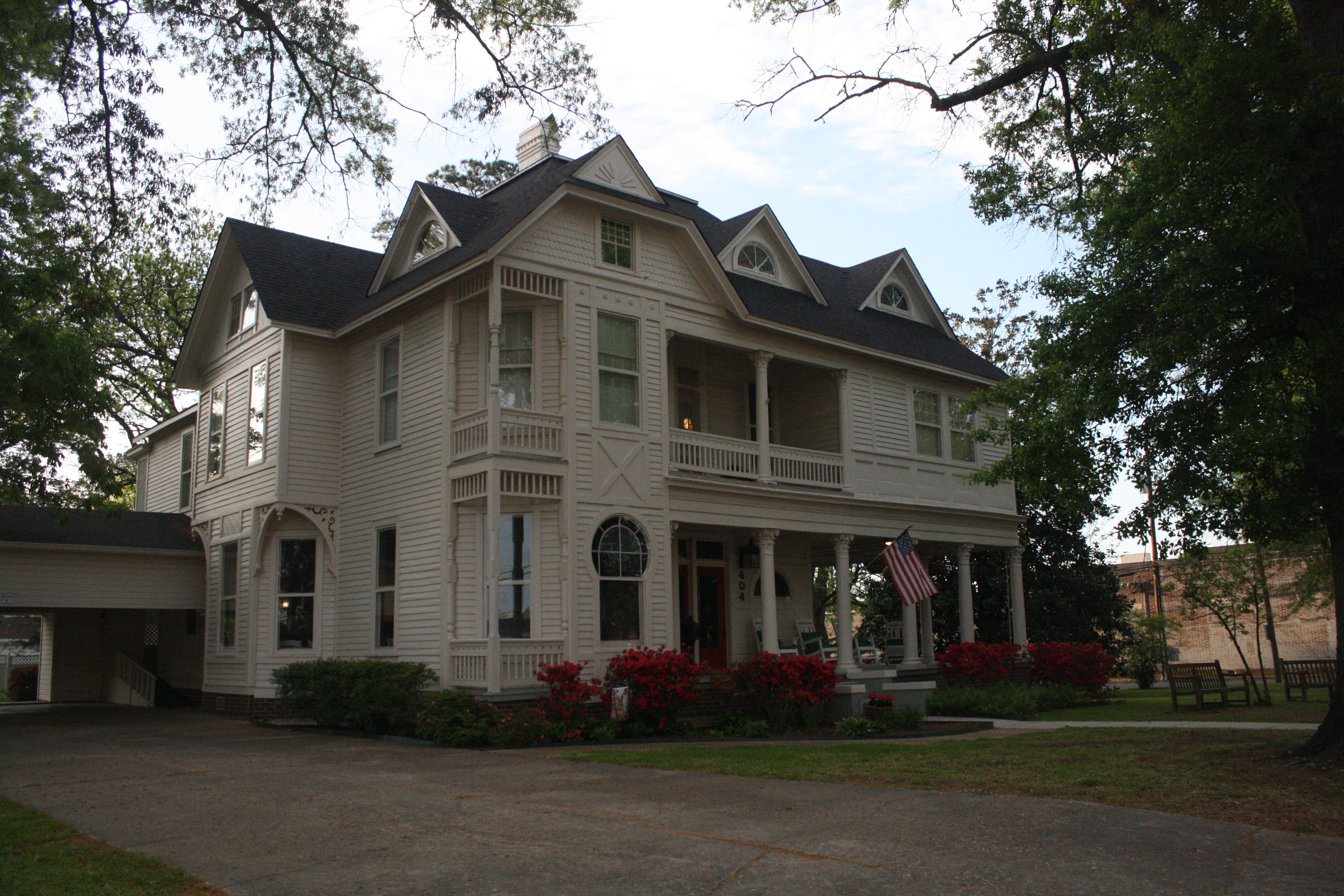
- Trotter House at 404 N. Main

- Location within Arkansas Location within the United States
- Location: Irregular pattern along Westwood Ave. and N. Main St., Monticello, Arkansas
- Coordinates: 33.63134°N 91.79069°W
- Area: 30 acres (12 ha)
- Architect: Multiple
- Architectural style: Classical Revival, Stick/eastlake, Greek Revival
- NRHP reference No.: 79000437
- Added to NRHP: February 18, 1979

The Monticello North Main Street Historic District is a predominantly residential historic district on the north side of Monticello, Arkansas. Most of the twenty buildings in the district were built between 1880 and 1910, during a period of expansion and prosperity in the area. Popular styles of the period, including Queen Anne and Colonial Revival, are represented in the district, and there are three churches. Three houses were designed by architect S. C. Hotchkiss, who lived in Monticello for a number of years.

The district was listed on the National Register of Historic Places in 1979.

== See also ==
- National Register of Historic Places listings in Drew County, Arkansas
