= Ridgeway Hotel Historic District =

Historic district in Arkansas, United States

- U.S. National Register of Historic Places
- U.S. Historic district
- U.S. Historic district – Contributing property
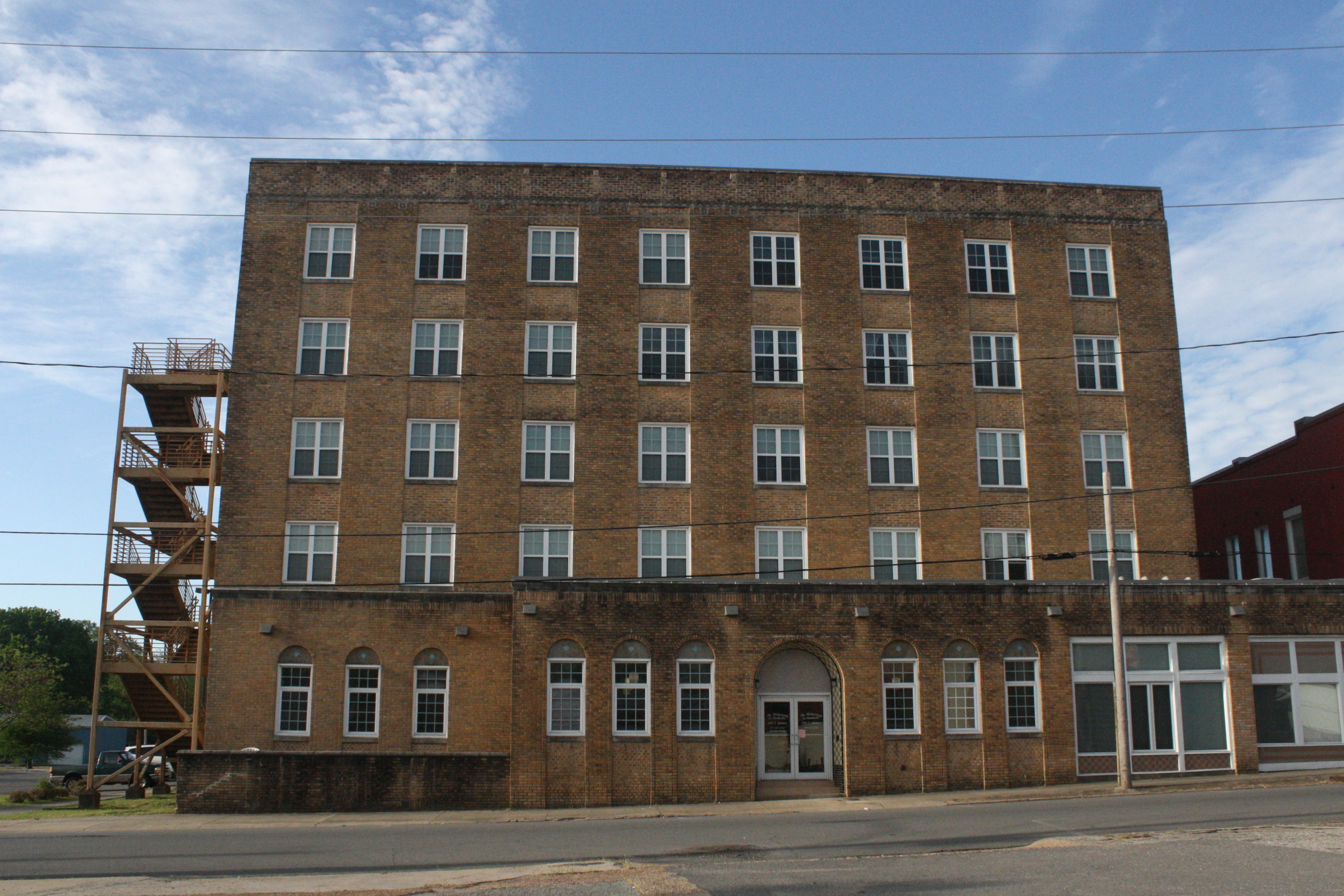

- Location within Arkansas Location within the United States
- Location: 200-206 East Gaines St., Monticello, Arkansas
- Coordinates: 33°37′50″N 91°47′23″W
- Area: 1.2 acres (0.49 ha)
- Built: 1912
- Architectural style: Early Commercial, Mission/spanish Revival, Italianate
- Part of: Monticello Commercial Historic District (ID11000688)
- NRHP reference No.: 08000952

Significant dates
- Added to NRHP: January 22, 2009
- Designated CP: September 23, 2011

The Ridgeway Hotel Historic District encompasses three buildings located just east of the town square of Monticello, Arkansas. The centerpiece of the district is the Ridgeway Hotel, a five-story brick building built in 1930; it is the tallest, and one of the most elaborately decorated buildings in Monticello's central business district. The district also includes 202 East Gaines Street (a similar-period brick building) and the H.M. Wilson Building.

The district was listed on the National Register of Historic Places in 2009; in 2011 the three buildings were converted into a combined senior center and housing complex.

== See also ==
- National Register of Historic Places listings in Drew County, Arkansas
