= Selma, Arkansas =

Unincorporated community in Arkansas, United States

- Unincorporated community
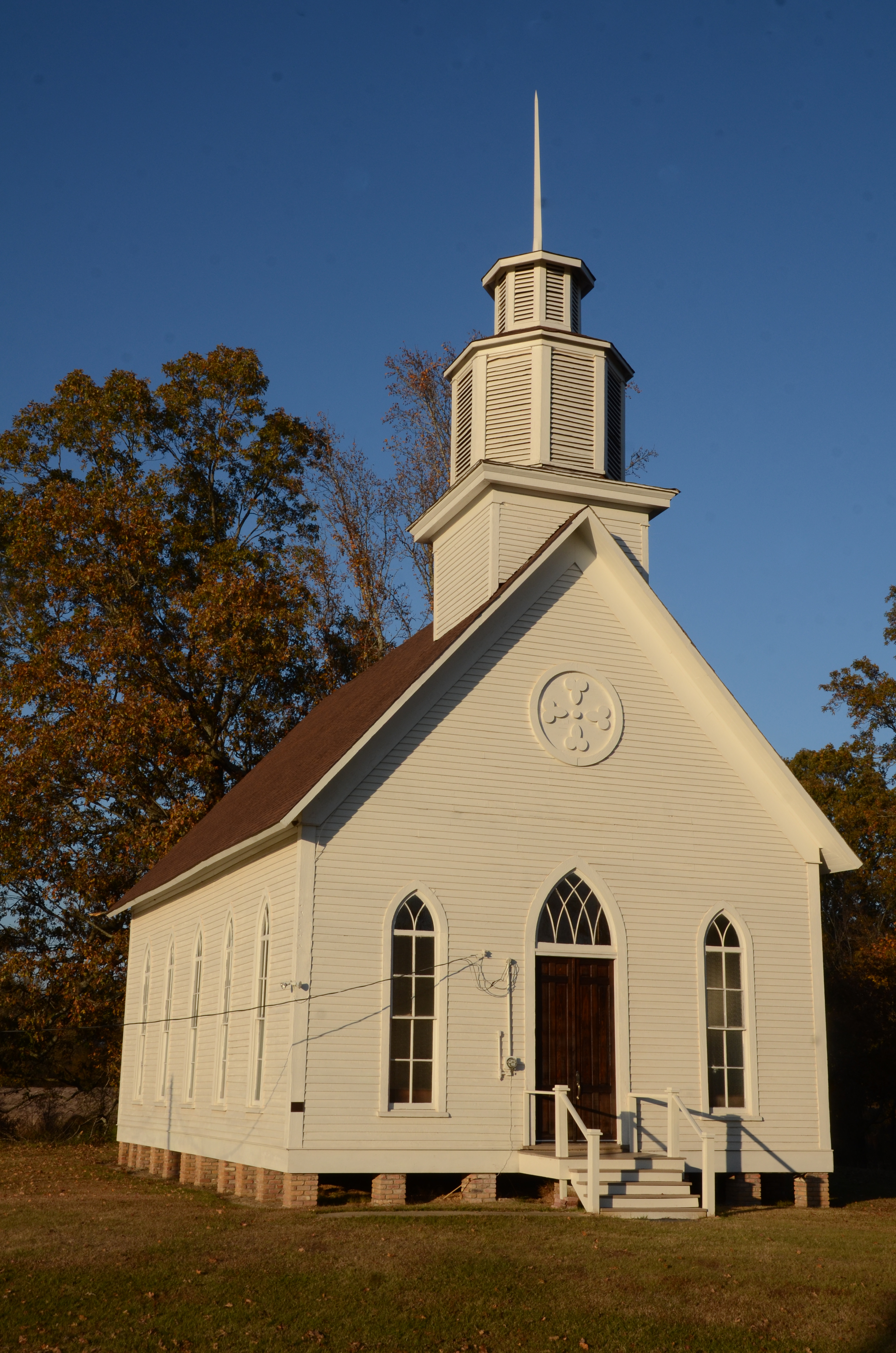
- Selma Methodist Church

- Location within Arkansas Location within the United States
- Coordinates: 33°41′50″N 91°34′03″W
- Country: United States
- State: Arkansas
- County: Drew
- Elevation: 174 ft (53 m)
- Time zone: UTC-6 (Central (CST))
  - Summer (DST): UTC-5 (CDT)
- Area code: 870
- GNIS feature ID: 57184

Selma is an unincorporated community in Drew County, Arkansas, United States.

Selma is the location of a historic Rosenwald School, the Selma Rosenwald School, that was built in 1924 and is listed on the National Register of Historic Places.

== Education ==
Selma is served by the Drew Central School District.

In 1979 the Collins and Selma school districts dissolved, with portions of the students going to the Drew Central district and portions going to the Dermott School District.
