= Lacey, Arkansas =

- Census-designated place
- Location within Arkansas Location within the United States
- Coordinates: 33°27′01″N 91°50′58″W
- Country: United States
- State: Arkansas
- County: Drew
- Elevation: 207 ft (63 m)

Population (2020)
  - Total: 139
- Time zone: UTC-6 (Central (CST))
  - Summer (DST): UTC-5 (CDT)
- Area code: 870
- GNIS feature ID: 2805658

Lacey is an unincorporated community and census-designated place (CDP) in Drew County, Arkansas, United States. Lacey is located at the junction of U.S. Route 425 and Arkansas Highway 133, 12.4 miles (20.0 km) south-southwest of Monticello. It was first listed as a CDP in the 2020 census with a population of 139.

== Demographics ==
Historical population
Census	Pop.	Note	%±
2020	139		—
U.S. Decennial Census; 2020

=== 2020 census ===
Lacey CDP, Arkansas – Demographic Profile (NH = Non-Hispanic) Note: the US Census treats Hispanic/Latino as an ethnic category. This table excludes Latinos from the racial categories and assigns them to a separate category. Hispanics/Latinos may be of any race.
Race / Ethnicity	Pop 2020	% 2020
White alone (NH)	76	54.68%
Black or African American alone (NH)	29	20.86%
Native American or Alaska Native alone (NH)	0	0.00%
Asian alone (NH)	2	1.44%
Pacific Islander alone (NH)	0	0.00%
Some Other Race alone (NH)	0	0.00%
Mixed Race/Multi-Racial (NH)	4	2.88%
Hispanic or Latino (any race)	28	20.14%
Total	139	100.00%
