= Jerome, Arkansas =

- Census designated place
- Location of Jerome in Drew County, Arkansas.
- Coordinates: 33°23′58″N 91°28′12″W
- Country: United States
- State: Arkansas
- County: Drew

Area
  - Total: 0.10 sq mi (0.26 km^{2})
  - Land: 0.10 sq mi (0.26 km^{2})
  - Water: 0 sq mi (0.00 km^{2})
- Elevation: 131 ft (40 m)

Population (2020)
  - Total: 24
  - Density: 236.9/sq mi (91.47/km^{2})
- Time zone: UTC-6 (Central (CST))
  - Summer (DST): UTC-5 (CDT)
- FIPS code: 05-35170
- GNIS feature ID: 2830629

Jerome is an unincorporated community and former town in Drew County, Arkansas, United States. On October 14, 2021, the Jerome City Council elected to surrender the town's charter and officially declared Jerome no longer in existence as an incorporated entity. It is now listed as a census designated place.

The population was 24 at the 2020 Census.

== History ==
The small town was formerly named Blissville after a lumber company who established the sawmill town. During World War II, Jerome was home to a Japanese American internment camp, the Jerome War Relocation Center (1942–1944), designed by Edward F. Neild of Shreveport, Louisiana, and later converted into a prison camp for captured German soldiers.

== Geography ==
Jerome is located in the southeast corner of Drew County along U.S. Route 165, which leads north 10 miles (16 km) to Dermott and south 7 miles (11 km) to Montrose. According to the United States Census Bureau, Jerome has a total area of 0.17 square miles (0.43 km^{2}), all land.

== Demographics ==
Historical population
Census	Pop.	Note	%±
1920	391		—
1930	97		−75.2%
1940	112		15.5%
1950	82		−26.8%
1960	76		−7.3%
1970	76		0.0%
1980	54		−28.9%
1990	47		−13.0%
2000	46		−2.1%
2010	39		−15.2%
2020	24		−38.5%
U.S. Decennial Census

After disincorporation, the United States Census Bureau delineated Jerome as a census designated place in the 2022 American Community Survey.

=== 2020 census ===
Jerome town, Arkansas – Racial and ethnic composition Note: the US Census treats Hispanic/Latino as an ethnic category. This table excludes Latinos from the racial categories and assigns them to a separate category. Hispanics/Latinos may be of any race.
Race / Ethnicity (NH = Non-Hispanic)	Pop 2010	Pop 2020	% 2010	% 2020
White alone (NH)	25	14	64.10%	58.33%
Black or African American alone (NH)	0	2	0.00%	8.33%
Native American or Alaska Native alone (NH)	0	0	0.00%	0.00%
Asian alone (NH)	0	0	0.00%	0.00%
Pacific Islander alone (NH)	0	0	0.00%	0.00%
Other race alone (NH)	0	0	0.00%	0.00%
Mixed Race or Multiracial (NH)	0	2	0.00%	8.33%
Hispanic or Latino (any race)	14	6	35.90%	25.00%
Total	39	24	100.00%	100.00%

=== 2000 census ===
As of the census of 2000, there were 46 people, 18 households, and 16 families residing in the city. The population density was 258.0 inhabitants per square mile (99.6/km^{2}). There were 20 housing units at an average density of 112.2 per square mile (43.3/km^{2}). The racial makeup of the city was 76.09% White, 6.52% Black or African American, 17.39% from other races. 17.39% of the population were Hispanic or Latino of any race.

There were 18 households, out of which 33.3% had children under the age of 18 living with them, 72.2% were married couples living together, 5.6% had a female householder with no husband present, and 11.1% were non-families. 11.1% of all households were made up of individuals, and 5.6% had someone living alone who was 65 years of age or older. The average household size was 2.56 and the average family size was 2.69.

In the city the population was spread out, with 17.4% under the age of 18, 6.5% from 18 to 24, 28.3% from 25 to 44, 28.3% from 45 to 64, and 19.6% who were 65 years of age or older. The median age was 44 years. For every 100 females, there were 109.1 males. For every 100 females age 18 and over, there were 100.0 males.

The median income for a household in the city was $29,167, and the median income for a family was $29,167. Males had a median income of $18,333 versus $28,125 for females. The per capita income for the city was $11,707. 3.6% of the population (no families) were living below the poverty line, including no one under eighteen years old and no one over age 64.
