= University of Arkansas at Monticello College of Forestry and Natural Resources =

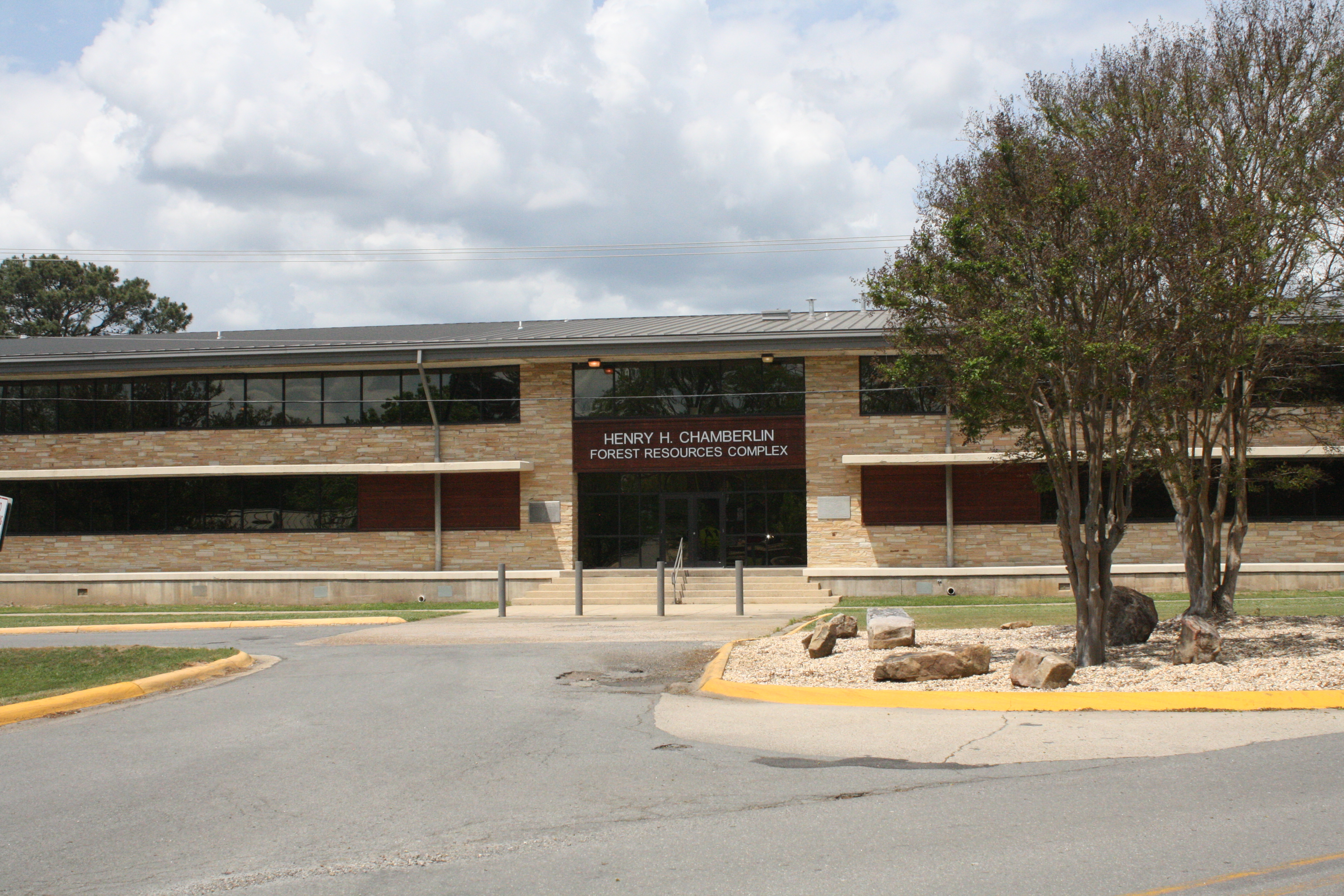
Henry H Chamberlain Forest Resources Complex

The University of Arkansas at Monticello College of Forestry, Agriculture, and Natural Resources (CFANR) is located within the Henry H. Chamberlin Forest Resource Complex on the University of Arkansas at Monticello campus in Monticello, Arkansas. The Chamberlin Forest Resources Complex also houses the Arkansas Forest Resource Center. The school employs 17 faculty and offers Associate of Science, Bachelor of Science, and Master of Science degrees.

The UAM School of Forest Resources is the only forestry school in the state of Arkansas.

== History ==
In 2015, the school's name was changed from the School of Forestry to the School of Forestry and Natural Resources.

In July 2018, the School of Agriculture merged with the School of Forestry and Natural Resources to become the College of Forestry, Agriculture, and Natural Resources.

== Degrees ==
The school offers Associate of Science and Bachelor of Science degrees in the three disciplines of Natural Resources Management, Agriculture, and Land Surveying, as well as an Associate of Applied Science degree in Forest Technology.

It offers a Master of Science degree in Forest Resources and a Graduate Certificate in Waterfowl Habitat and Recreation Management.

There will be a Doctor of Philosophy program in forest resources.

== Geospatial Science Lab ==
The CFANR has a Geospatial Science Lab. This lab is central to the unit's research in the areas of Geographic Information Systems (GIS), Global Positioning Systems (GPS), Remote Sensing, and Expert Systems at UAM. The lab utilizes these geo-technologies to focus on developing applications and research to improve natural resource management. This is accomplished by integrating high-tech computer facilities with the expertise of the faculty and staff to evaluate complex problems and provide solutions for more effective natural resource management strategies.

The research and projects at the UADA/UAM Geospatial Science Lab involve the development of applications for new technologies in the field of environmental information sciences, geo-intelligence (advanced geo-information science and earth observation, machine and deep learning, and big data analytics), remote sensing, sUAS/drones, land evaluation, pedology (i.e., soil genesis and classification), forest health monitoring, land use management/planning, monitoring and evaluating sustainable land management, change detection of landscape degradation, and geographic information system models.

The UADA/UAM Geospatial Science Lab promotes the use of geo-technologies throughout the state and the nation. The lab work allows interdisciplinary cooperation, data-rich analytics research, and active outreach across a range of scientific fields (agriculture, forests, and climate change) with major societal impacts. It works closely with community and business leaders, policymakers, educators, students, and members of the general public to ensure the sustainability and proper use of the state's natural resources (i.e. soils, water, and biodiversity).
