= Ellis Field =

Ellis Field may refer to:

- Monticello Municipal Airport (Arkansas), also known as Ellis Field
- Ellis Field (Texas A&M), the soccer stadium at Texas A&M University
