= Drew Central High School =

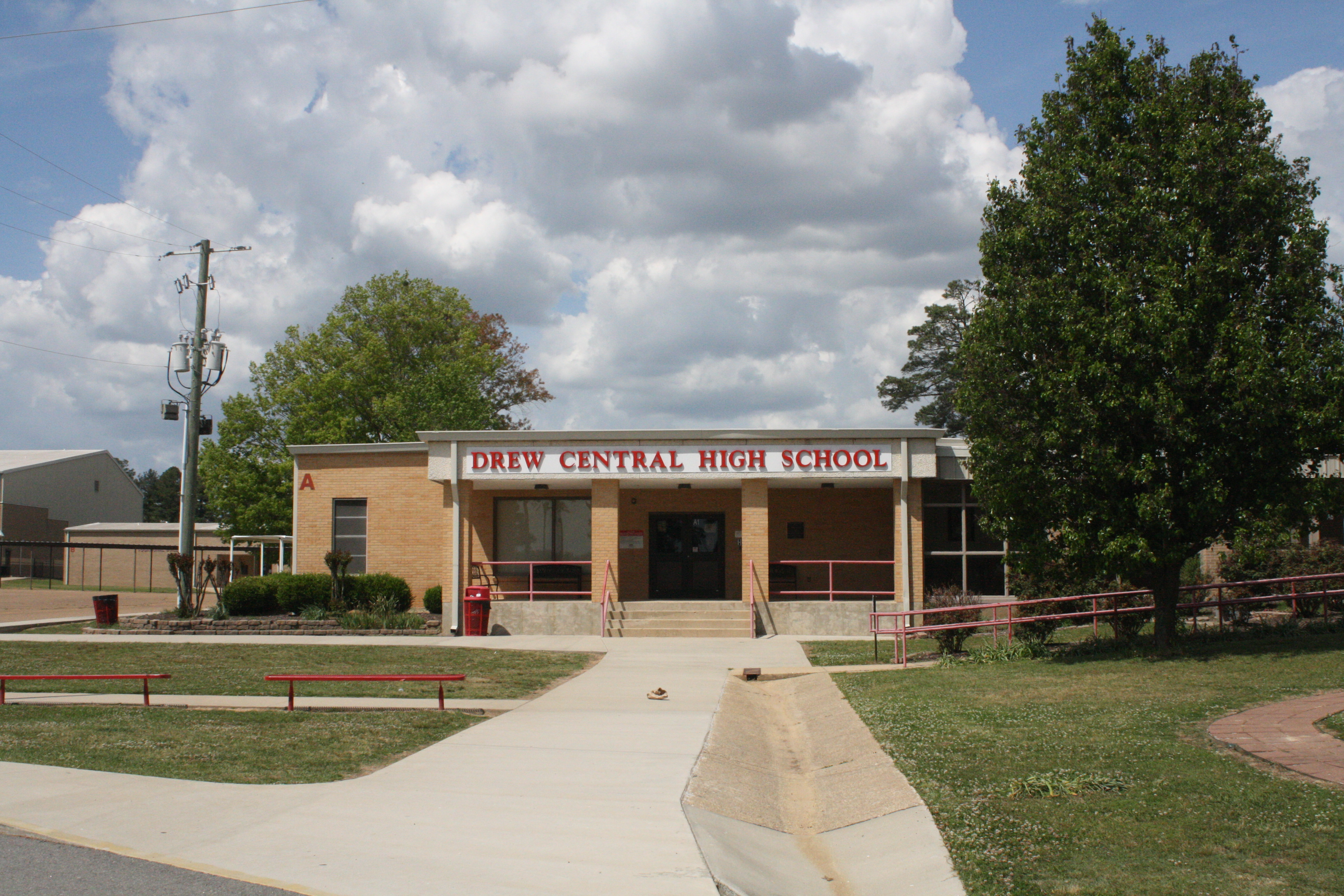

Location
- 250 University Drive; Monticello, Arkansas 71655; United States; 33°35′31″N 91°48′23″W

Information
- Status: Open
- School district: Drew Central School District
- CEEB code: 041685
- NCES School ID: 050547000259
- Principal: Kenny Pennington
- Staff: 28.83 (on FTE basis)
- Grades: 9–12
- Enrollment: 326 (2023–2024)
- Education system: ADE Smart Core
- Classes offered: Regular, Advanced Placement
- Colors: Red and white
- Song: Sing we the praises of old Drew Central
- Fight song: Oh when the DCH team falls in line
- Athletics conference: 3A Region 8
- Mascot: Pirate
- Team name: Drew Central Pirates
- Accreditation: ADE
- Newspaper: Pirate Now
- Yearbook: Pirate
- Website: www.drewcentral.org/page/drew-central-highschool

Drew Central High School (DCHS) is a public secondary school in Monticello, Arkansas, United States. It is part of Drew Central School District, which serves rural Drew County and a small section of Monticello. It in a section of the Monticello city limits that is within the Drew Central Schools boundaries, adjacent to the University of Arkansas at Monticello (UAM). It, along with other schools in the district, resides on 31 acres (13 ha) of land leased by the university to the school district. Dependent minor residents of the UAM housing for married students and students with families, HHFA Apartments, are assigned to this district. Additionally Wilmar is in the Drew Central district, as is the unincorporated area of Selma.

The principal of the High School is Mr Kenny Pennington. The district's other schools are the Elementary School and the Middle School. All three share the same campus in Monticello. At the High School, there are some 400 students in grades 7 to 12. The average class size is less than 25.

The school's athletic teams are named the Pirates and the journalism staff produces a monthly newspaper titled Pirate Now.

== Academics ==
The assumed course of study follows the Smart Core curriculum developed by the Arkansas Department of Education (ADE). Drew Central offers two levels of curriculum: College Prep, and General. The College Prep curriculum must be completed by students to be eligible for:

- Academic Challenge Scholarship (requires a 2.50 GPA)*
- Seal on graduation diploma (requires a 2.75 GPA)
- Unconditional admission to an Arkansas higher institution of learning (2.0 GPA)*
- Honor graduate status/member of National Honor Society (3.50 GPA)

The school participates in the Arkansas Scholars program of the Arkansas Business and Education Alliance.

== Athletics ==
The Drew Central mascot and athletic emblem is the Pirate with red and white serving as the school colors.

For 2012–14, the Drew Central Pirates participate in the 3A Classification from the 3A Region 8 Conference as administered by the Arkansas Activities Association.

- Boys' sports comprise football, cross country, basketball, baseball, tennis, cheerleading, track and dance. In 1983 and 1984, the boys basketball team won consecutive state championships & in 1975, the boys basketball team won state.
- Girls' sports consist of cross country, basketball, tennis, cheerleading, dance team, track and softball. In 1987, the girls basketball team won a basketball championship. In spring 2000, the girls tennis team won a tennis championship.

== Discipline ==
Disciplinary programs for student misconduct at Drew Central are Detention Hall, in-school suspension, and out-of-school suspension, depending on the seriousness of the infraction. In extreme cases a student may be recommended for expulsion from the school.

Detention Hall takes place each day at 7:00 am.

Drew Central High also offers a corporal punishment program, under which a student chooses a paddling (swats) instead of attending Detention Hall. Students wishing to receive swats must report to the office at the beginning of their lunch period on the day they are scheduled to attend Detention Hall. After being spanked in the office they are then free to join the normal school lunch.

In the case of tardies, the corporal punishment option is available only after the third tardy in each nine-week grading period. After a sixth tardy the student is assigned to In-School Suspension.

The school administration may also decide to administer a paddling in other cases, particularly for fighting, except where parents have signed a form requesting exemption from corporal punishment. In the latter case, alternative discipline will be assigned, which may include suspension.

The district also operates the Drew County School-Within-A-School (SWAS) Program, a boot camp providing an alternative to long-term suspension or expulsion of junior high and high school aged students in the Drew Central and Monticello School Districts. Students are exposed to a rigorous program of physical training, leadership development, community service and academics in a highly disciplined environment. The program is staffed by full-time certified police officers.
