= KHBM =

KHBM may refer to:

- KHBM (AM), a radio station (1430 AM) licensed to Monticello, Arkansas, United States
- KHBM-FM, a radio station (93.7 FM) licensed to Monticello, Arkansas, United States
