= Interstate 69 in Arkansas =

Highway in Arkansas

Future Interstate 69
- Future I-69 highlighted in pink

Route information
- Maintained by ArDOT
- Length: 185 mi (298 km)
- Status: One section (Monticello Bypass) open with 2 lanes of traffic (signed as US 278 Byp.); remainder of route in various stages of design and land acquisition

Major junctions
- South end: I-69 at Louisiana state line
- US 79 at Arkansas state line; US 82 west of El Dorado; AR 160 south of Harrell; US 63 / AR 8 south of Warren; US 278 / AR 172 east of Warren; I-530 / AR 530 southeast of Wilmar; US 425 south of Monticello; US 278 west of Monticello; US 278 / AR 277 northwest of McGehee; US 65 / US 165 north of McGehee
- North end: I-69 / US 278 at Mississippi state line

Location
- Country: United States
- State: Arkansas

Highway system
- Interstate Highway System; Main; Auxiliary; Suffixed; Business; Future; Arkansas Highway System; Interstate; US; State; Business; Spurs; Suffixed; Scenic; Heritage

Interstate 69 (I-69) is a proposed Interstate Highway that will pass through the southeastern part of the US state of Arkansas. Signs indicating the corridor of the Interstate have been placed at various highways throughout the state. The only section of Future I-69 that is currently open to traffic is the 8.5-mile (13.7 km) eastern leg of the Monticello Bypass. This section of the Monticello Bypass is currently two lanes and signed as US Highway 278 Bypass (US 278 Byp.). A second section between the eastern end of the Monticello Bypass and Arkansas Highway 293 (AR 293) is under construction, and is expected to carry the designation of Arkansas Highway 569 from its opening until a time when a sufficient amount of freeway has been completed to receive the I-69 designation.

== Route description ==
I-69 is planned to enter Arkansas from Louisiana and bypass El Dorado. The route is set to go in an northeastern direction. It will cross U.S. Route 63 (US 63) south of Wilmar, Arkansas. Southeast of Monticello, I-69 will meet I-530 before crossing US 425 bypassing Monticello south and east on what is currently a two-lane highway. The only portion of the planned route that is built is from US 425 to US 278 signed as US 278 Bypass. After crossing US 278, I-69 continues east. It will cross US 65 north of McGehee before crossing the Mississippi River to enter Mississippi via Charles W. Dean Bridge along with US 278.

== Planned extension ==
I-69 has been divided into a number of sections of independent utility (SIUs).

=== SIU 12 (Arkansas portion) ===
I-69 will enter Arkansas on the planned Charles W. Dean Bridge south of Arkansas City, then continue west to US 65 near McGehee; US 278 will also be rerouted there from its present crossing with US 82 at the Greenville Bridge. This is the western portion of SIU 12; the remaining portion consists of the east end of the Dean Bridge, near Greenville, Mississippi. Environmental studies for this segment, including the Dean Bridge, have been completed and the Federal Highway Administration (FHWA) issued a record of decision (ROD) approving the route through SIU 12 in 2004.

On October 15, 2006, the FHWA directed the Arkansas Highway and Transportation Department (AHTD) to begin land acquisition for I-69 from US 65 to the west bank of the Mississippi River where the Dean Bridge will be built. The first phase of this section was funded for FY2010 in AHTD's 2010–2013 Statewide Transportation Improvement Plan (STIP). In January 2017, AHTD reported that the Arkansas portion of SIU 12, including the Charles W. Dean Bridge, is "shovel ready", pending receipt of funding and completion of any actions required on the part of Mississippi to begin construction on the bridge.

=== SIU 13 ===
US 278 will leave I-69 near McGehee and rejoin its existing routing. I-69 will continue on a separate alignment to Monticello, where it will meet the I-530 extension, then bypass Wilmar and Warren to the south and turn to the southwest, crossing the Ouachita River and running north of El Dorado near Louann to meet US 82 west of El Dorado between Magnolia and El Dorado.

The final environmental impact statement (EIS) on SIU 13 was completed in April 2006, and the FHWA issued an ROD approving the EIS on May 25, 2006. This 103-mile (166 km) segment is currently in the final design phase, with construction expected to cost $784 million. Arkansas further divides SIU 13 into several smaller segments. Construction on the first leg of SIU 13, the 8.5-mile (13.7 km) eastern leg of the Monticello Bypass between US 425 and US 278 east of Monticello, began in November 2011. The first two lanes of the Monticello Bypass (initially signed as US 278 Byp.) opened to traffic on October 11, 2018, and represents the first I-69 mainline project to be completed in Arkansas. Arkansas submitted a $25-million FASTLane grant application to the FHWA in May 2016 to continue design and right-of-way acquisition for the 25-mile (40 km) section of I-69 between Monticello and McGehee. In November 2016, AHTD submitted a revision to its FASTLane grant application requesting additional funds to include construction of the McGehee to Monticello section. According to the 2021–2024 STIP, $69 million (equivalent to $82.2 million in 2024) is planned in FY2022 to begin construction on two lanes of the Monticello–McGhee section. Construction began following a groundbreaking ceremony on December 23, 2022. Phase 1 will be from US 278 at the northern end of the Monticello Bypass to AR 293, completion set for mid-2027, originally late 2026. Phase 2, which construction will occur in 2030, originally was set for 2028, will be from AR 293 to US 65. An additional $4.9 million (equivalent to $5.91 million in 2024) was allocated in FY2019 to continue design and right-of-way acquisition for the western section of the Monticello Bypass.

=== SIU 14 ===
From US 82, I-69 will continue to the southwest, crossing the Louisiana state line near Haynesville, Louisiana. Arkansas and Louisiana officials continue to work on the draft EIS for this portion of the route, with some changes being made with public inputs.

=== SIU 28 ===
SIU 28 will extend I-530 from its current terminus in Pine Bluff to a planned interchange with I-69 south of Monticello. This segment has been divided into several smaller sections, with work proceeding at various rates on each. In June 2006, a four-mile (6.4 km) section of the I-530 extension opened to traffic between AR 35 and US 278 near Wilmar signed as AR 530. The remaining portions of SIU 28 are in various stages of land acquisition and construction. Objections from the community of Pinebergen has forced planners to reconsider the routing of the northernmost segment of the I-530 extension, delaying its construction. Public meetings were conducted in late 2006 and early 2007, and the alignment of the north end of the I-530 extension was shifted slightly. Construction on the interchange where the I-530 extension will tie into the existing I-530 near Ohio Street on the south side of Pine Bluff began on October 29, 2007. On March 8, 2008, AHTD awarded an $11.8-million (equivalent to $16.8 million in 2024) contract to T.J. Lambrecht Construction, Inc. of Joliet, Illinois, to construct 10 miles (16 km) of the I-530 extension through Jefferson, Lincoln, and Cleveland counties. A segment from I-530 to AR 114 opened in 2013 with a segment from AR 114 to AR 11 opened in 2015. There is still a 9-mile gap between AR 11 and AR 35.

== Exit list ==
County	Location	mi	km	Exit	Destinations	Notes
Columbia		0.00	0.00		I-69 south – Shreveport	Future continuation into Louisiana
Union		66.95	107.75	67	US 82	
Union		74.04	119.16	74	AR 160	
Ouachita		81.94	131.87	82	AR 7	
Calhoun		101.06	162.64	101	US 167	
Calhoun		107.82	173.52	108	AR 160	
Bradley		125.82	202.49	126	US 63 / AR 8	
Bradley					To US 278	
Drew	Monticello	137.36	221.06	137	I-530 north / AR 530 north	
Drew	Monticello	143.38	230.75	143	US 278 Byp. begins US 425 – Monticello	Open as US 278 Bypass; southern end of US 278 Byp.; access to University of Arkansas at Monticello
Drew	Monticello	144.75	232.95	145	Midway Route	Open as US 278 Byp.
Drew	Monticello	149.07	239.90	149	AR 35	Open as US 278 Byp.
Drew	Monticello	152.08	244.75	152	US 278 – Monticello US 278 Byp. ends	Open as US 278 Byp.; northern end of US 278 Byp; future southern end of US 278 concurrency
Drew		160.39	258.12	160	AR 293 to US 278 – Selma	Under construction
Desha		169.08	272.11	169	US 65 – McGehee	
Mississippi River		185.00	297.73	Charles W. Dean Bridge; Arkansas–Mississippi state line		
Mississippi River		185.00	297.73		I-69 north / US 278 east	Future continuation into Mississippi
1.000 mi = 1.609 km; 1.000 km = 0.621 mi: Unopened

Interstate 69
Previous state: Louisiana	Arkansas	Next state: Mississippi
