= Arkansas Forest Resource Center =

The Arkansas Forest Resource Center is a University of Arkansas System Center of Excellence. It is primarily located on the University of Arkansas at Monticello campus, but center faculty members extend to Little Rock, Fayetteville, Hope, Pine Tree, and Batesville as well. It is both a major source of Arkansas Department of Agriculture research as well as the location of the University of Arkansas at Monticello's School of Forest Resources (which is the only Forestry School in Arkansas). The University of Arkansas' Spatial Analysis Lab is also located at AFRC.
