= Hensley, Arkansas =

Census-designated place in Arkansas, United States

- Census-designated place
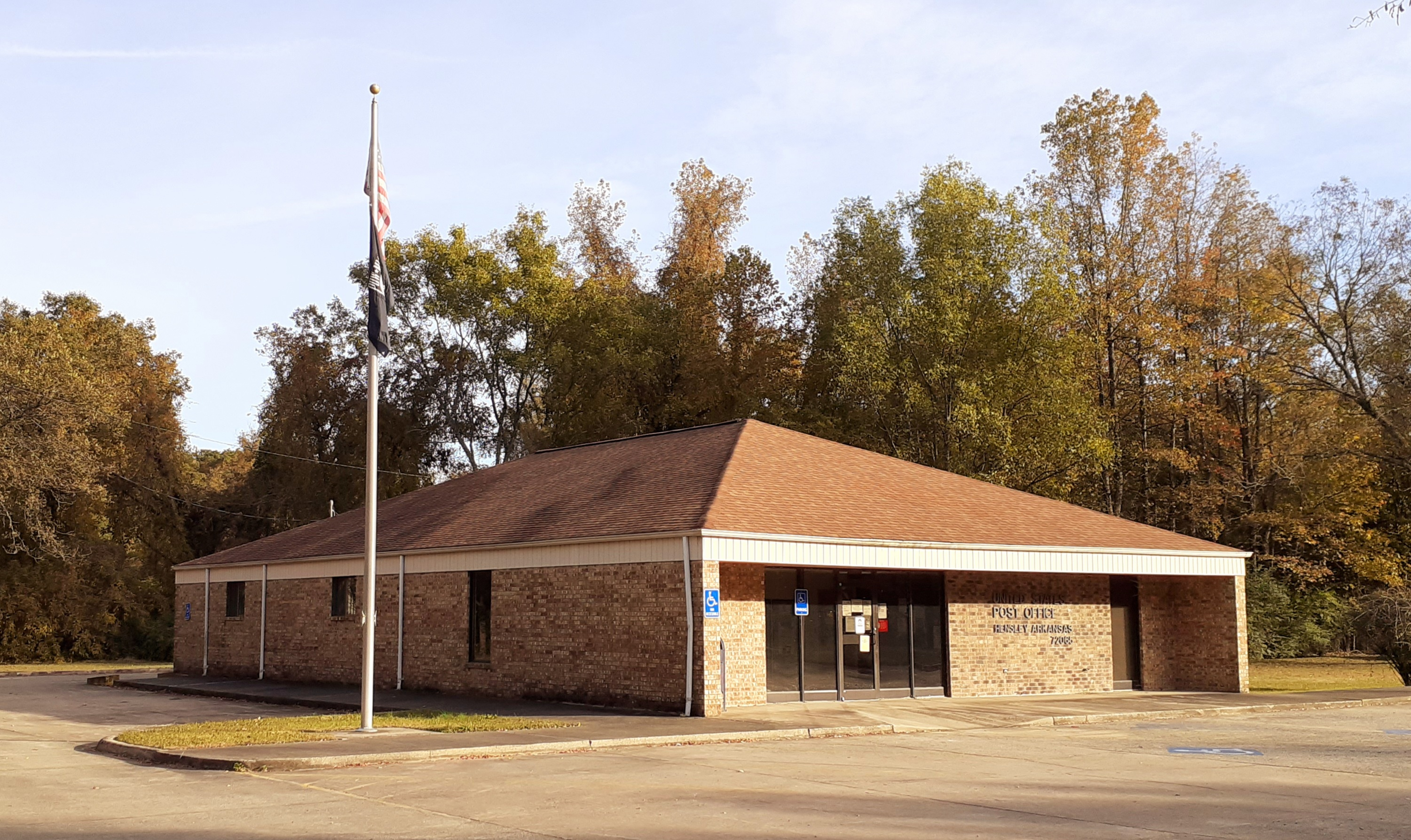
- Main façade of the Hensley Post Office

- Location in Pulaski County and Arkansas

- Location within Arkansas
- Coordinates: 34°30′16″N 92°12′28″W
- Country: United States
- State: Arkansas
- County: Pulaski
- Township: Big Rock
- Founded: January 27, 1882 (144 years ago)
- Named for: William B. Hensley

Area
  - Total: 1.02 sq mi (2.65 km^{2})
  - Land: 1.02 sq mi (2.65 km^{2})
  - Water: 0 sq mi (0.00 km^{2})
- Elevation: 259 ft (79 m)

Population (2020)
  - Total: 137
  - Density: 133.9/sq mi (51.71/km^{2})
- Time zone: UTC-6 (Central (CST))
  - Summer (DST): UTC-5 (CDT)
- ZIP code: 72065
- Area code: 501
- FIPS code: 05-31390
- GNIS feature ID: 2402578
- Highways: Interstate 530; U.S. Highway 65; Highway 365
- Major airport: Clinton National (LIT)

Hensley is a census-designated place (CDP) in Pulaski County, Arkansas, United States. As of the 2020 census, Hensley had a population of 137. It is part of the Little Rock-North Little Rock-Conway metropolitan area.

== History ==
Founded on January 27, 1882, it is named for William B. Hensley, a 19th-century landowner.

== Geography ==
According to the United States Census Bureau, the CDP has a total area of 1.0 square mile (2.6 km^{2}), all land.

== Demographics ==
Historical population
Census	Pop.	Note	%±
2000	150		—
2010	139		−7.3%
2020	137		−1.4%
U.S. Decennial Census; 2010 2020

=== 2020 census ===
Hensley CDP, Arkansas – Racial and ethnic composition Note: the U.S. census treats Hispanic/Latino as an ethnic category. This table excludes Latinos from the racial categories and assigns them to a separate category. Hispanics/Latinos may be of any race.
Race / Ethnicity (NH = Non-Hispanic)	Pop 2000	Pop 2010	Pop 2020	% 2000	% 2010	% 2020
White alone (NH)	51	27	37	34.00%	19.42%	27.01%
Black or African American alone (NH)	97	105	86	64.67%	75.54%	62.77%
Native American or Alaska Native alone (NH)	0	0	0	0.00%	0.00%	0.00%
Asian alone (NH)	0	0	1	0.00%	0.00%	0.73%
Native Hawaiian or Pacific Islander alone (NH)	0	0	1	0.00%	0.00%	0.73%
Other race alone (NH)	0	0	0	0.00%	0.00%	0.00%
Mixed race or Multiracial (NH)	2	7	8	1.33%	5.04%	5.84%
Hispanic or Latino (any race)	0	0	4	0.00%	0.00%	2.92%
Total	150	139	137	100.00%	100.00%	100.00%

=== 2000 census ===
As of the census of 2000, there were 150 people, 59 households, and 38 families residing in the CDP. The population density was 149.5 inhabitants per square mile (57.7/km^{2}). There were 71 housing units at an average density of 70.8 per square mile (27.3/km^{2}). The racial makeup of the CDP was 34.00% White, 64.67% Black or African American, and 1.33% from two or more races.

There were 59 households, out of which 23.7% had children under the age of 18 living with them, 39.0% were married couples living together, 20.3% had a female householder with no husband present, and 33.9% were non-families. 32.2% of all households were made up of individuals, and 15.3% had someone living alone who was 65 years of age or older. The average household size was 2.54 and the average family size was 3.21.

In the CDP, the population was spread out, with 20.0% under the age of 18, 8.7% from 18 to 24, 32.0% from 25 to 44, 22.7% from 45 to 64, and 16.7% who were 65 years of age or older. The median age was 40 years. For every 100 females, there were 87.5 males. For every 100 females age 18 and over, there were 87.5 males.

The median income for a household in the CDP was $26,607, and the median income for a family was $29,286. Males had a median income of $15,417 versus $21,875 for females. The per capita income for the CDP was $10,878. There were 21.4% of families and 21.2% of the population living below the poverty line, including no under eighteens and 29.0% of those over 64.

== Education ==
It is within the Pulaski County Special School District. It is zoned to Daisy Bates Elementary School, Fuller Middle School, and Wilbur D. Mills University Studies High School.

== Notable resident ==
- Julie Mayberry (born c. 1971), American politician

== See also ==
- List of places named after people in the United States
