= Jimmie Yeiser =

American educator

Jimmie Yeiser is an American educator. He was formerly the provost at the University of Arkansas at Monticello until March 2016.

== Early life and education ==
Yeiser is a native of Utica, Kentucky. He received his bachelor's and master's degrees from the University of Kentucky in Forest Management and Silviculture, respectively, and a Doctor of Philosophy in Tree Improvement from Texas A&M University.

== Career ==
Yeiser was an assistant professor of forestry at UAM from 1980 to 1985, where he was promoted to associate professor, then he became professor in 1991. He resigned from UAM in 1998 and went to Stephen F. Austin State University (SFASU), where he secured $4,000,000 in grant money and also researched for eight chemical and forest companies and completed nearly 200 research papers. In 2011 he was named SFASU's Regents professor, the university's highest honor. In 2012, he was named Provost at the University of Arkansas at Monticello (UAM), where he served until 2016, then accepted a faculty position as professor in UAM's School of Forestry and Natural Resources.
