= Monticello High School (Arkansas) =

Location
- 2270 Clyde Ross Drive; Monticello, Arkansas 71655; United States; 33°36′43″N 91°48′42″W

Information
- School type: Public comprehensive
- Status: Open
- School district: School District
- CEEB code: 041695
- NCES School ID: 50984000721
- Principal: Judy Holloway
- Teaching staff: 43.34 (FTE)
- Grades: 9–12
- Enrollment: 506 (2023-2024)
- Student to teacher ratio: 11.68
- Education system: ADE Smart Core
- Classes offered: Regular, Advanced Placement (AP)
- Colors: Blue and white
- Athletics: Football, Golf, Cross Country, Basketball, Baseball, Softball, Track, Cheer, Debate, Speech
- Athletics conference: 4A Region 8
- Mascot: Billy Goats (spell)
- Team name: Monticello Billies
- Accreditation: ADE; AdvancED (1924–)
- Newspaper: The Billie Buzz
- Website: www.billies.org/page/mhs

Monticello High School is an accredited public high school located in the rural community of Monticello, Arkansas, United States. The school provides comprehensive secondary education for approximately 600 students each year in grades 9 through 12. It is one of two public high schools in Drew County, Arkansas and the only high school administered by the Monticello School District.

== Academics ==
Monticello High School is accredited by the Arkansas Department of Education (ADE) and is accredited as a charter member since 1924 of AdvancED (formerly North Central Association). The assumed course of study follows the Smart Core curriculum developed by the ADE, which requires students to complete 22 units prior to graduation. Students complete regular (core and elective) and career focus coursework and exams and may take Advanced Placement (AP) courses and exams with the opportunity to receive college credit. Students completing at least 24 units of credit may be eligible for recognition as Honor Diploma, Honor Graduate, and Distinguished Honor Graduate, based on progressively higher grade point average (GPA) scores. The district and high school are members of the Southeast Arkansas (SEARK) Education Service Cooperative.

== Athletics ==
The Monticello High School mascot and athletic emblem are the Billies (referring to the Billy goat) with blue and white serving as the school colors.

For 2012–14, the Monticello Billies compete in interscholastic activities within the 4A Classification via the 4A Region 8 Conference, as administered by the Arkansas Activities Association. The Billies participate in football, golf (boys/girls), cross country (boys/girls), speech, debate, basketball (boys/girls), cheer, dance, baseball, softball, tennis (boys/girls), and track and field (boys/girls).

- Football: The boys varsity team won the state champion in 2009–10.
- Golf: The boys golf team won the state champion in 1953–54.
- Cross Country: In 2012, a Monticello student-athlete won the individual girls' cross country state championship.
