= Monticello, Arkansas =

City in Arkansas, United States

- City
- City of Monticello
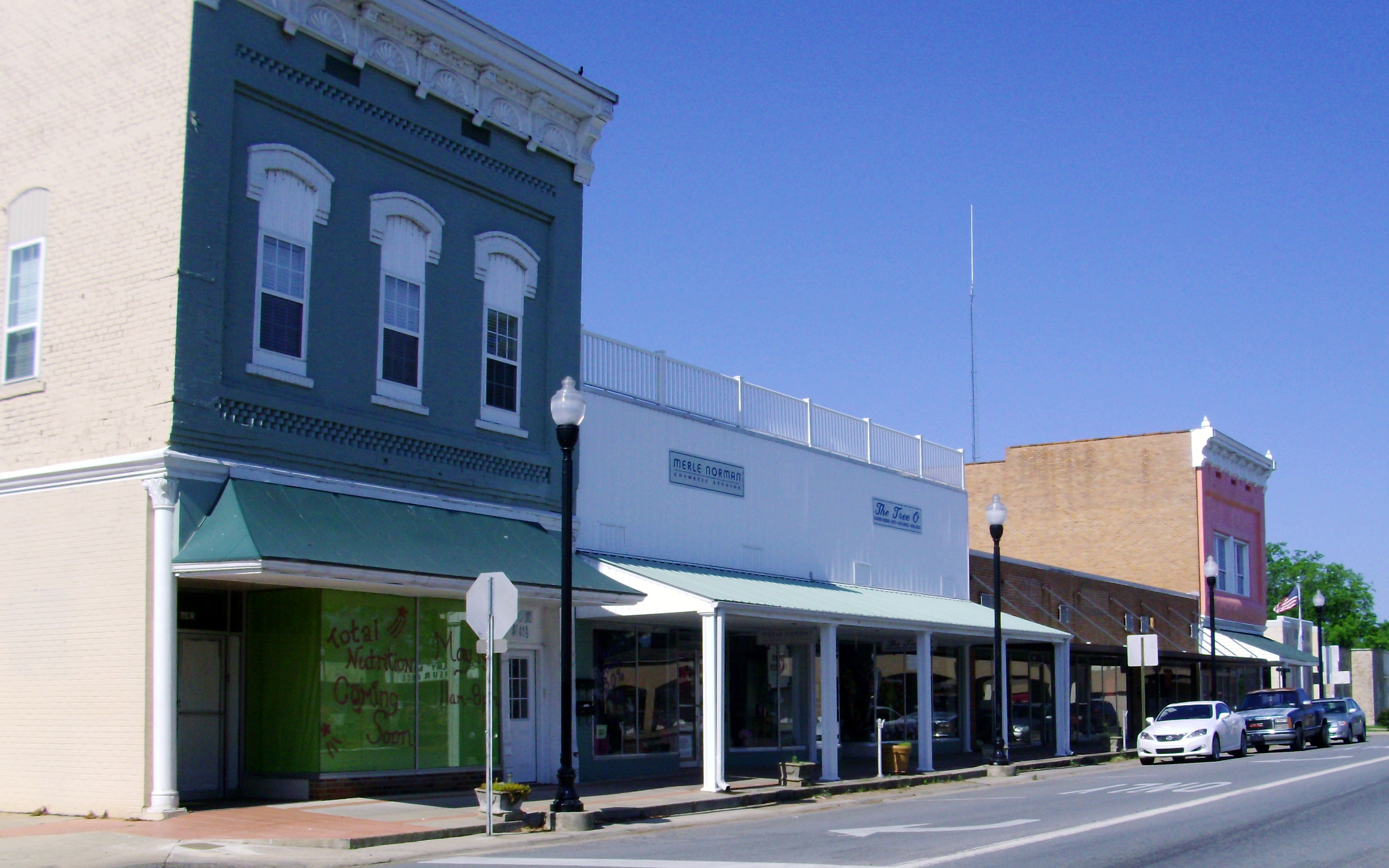
- Monticello Commercial Historic District

- Flag Logo

- Location in Drew County and Arkansas

- Location in the United States
- Coordinates: 33°37′38″N 91°47′38″W
- Country: United States
- State: Arkansas
- County: Drew
- Township: Marion
- Founded: December 18, 1849
- Incorporated: December 20, 1852

Government
  - Type: Mayor–Council
  - Council: City Council

Area
  - Total: 10.74 sq mi (27.82 km^{2})
  - Land: 10.73 sq mi (27.78 km^{2})
  - Water: 0.015 sq mi (0.04 km^{2})
- Elevation: 292 ft (89 m)

Population (2020)
  - Total: 8,442
  - Estimate (2025): 8,269 ▼
  - Density: 787.1/sq mi (303.91/km^{2})
- Time zone: UTC-6 (Central (CST))
  - Summer (DST): UTC-5 (CDT)
- ZIP codes: 71655
- Area code: 870
- FIPS code: 05-46580
- GNIS feature ID: 2404290
- Highways: U.S. Highway 278; U.S. Highway 425; Highway 35; Highway 83S; Highway 138
- Website: www.monticelloarkansas.us

Monticello (/ˌmɒntɪˈsɛloʊ/ MON-tiss-EL-oh) is the county seat of Drew County, Arkansas. As of 2024, it had an estimated population of 8,185. Founded in 1849 in the Arkansas Timberlands near the Arkansas Delta region, the city has long been a commercial, cultural and educational hub for southeast Arkansas. With a historically agriculture- and silviculture-based economy, it has diversified to include growth from the medical sector and the University of Arkansas at Monticello.

== History ==
=== 19th century ===
When Drew County was founded on November 26, 1846, it was a sparsely settled frontier. A hilltop settlement named Rough and Ready, named for Zachary Taylor, was the primary settlement in the county at the time of creation and served as the first county seat. The community became infamous for fights, duels, and lawlessness. When the county sought to build the first courthouse in 1851, it was decided to move 1 mile (1.6 km) north and establish a new town, Monticello. The only remnant of the old frontier village is Rough and Ready Cemetery, now located within city limits. Monticello was incorporated December 20, 1852; early settlers were proponents of Jeffersonianism and thus named the town for Thomas Jefferson's famous Monticello plantation near Charlottesville, Virginia.

The first courthouse was a wooden building built in 1851 in the Monticello town square, replaced with a second building erected in 1857. Two trials were held in that courthouse in March and September 1859 to consider whether the slave Abby Guy ought to be freed. She said that a former master had manumitted her but that years later, she was illegally kidnapped and re-enslaved by his brother. The first trial in her freedom suit resulted in a hung jury, but the second jury of twelve local white men found in her favor. Top lawyers worked on her case, and she married another white man who assisted her. The case was appealed to the Arkansas Supreme Court, which ruled in Guy's favor. She was set free as were her children because they were born to a free woman. During the American Civil War, several small skirmishes were fought around Monticello. The Rodger's Female Academy was used as a military hospital for Confederate soldiers.

A third courthouse had a cornerstone laid October 20, 1870 and opened in 1871. The building was a point of pride for Monticello citizens following the Civil War and Reconstruction Era. Costing $46,620 (the equivalent of $1,238,000 today), the two-story brick building was made of local brick and lumber and featured a 110-foot (34 m) clock tower.

=== 20th century ===
In September 1922, a Ku Klux Klan chapter was established in Monticello. The chapter had 404 members, including 52 charter members. Many of Monticello's business and political elites were officers in the Klan chapter or charter members. The mayor, the city marshal, and half of the members of the city council were members of the Klan during the period 1921-1925.

== Geography ==
Monticello is located west of the center of Drew County. U.S. Routes 425 and 278 intersect in the city, west of downtown. U.S. 425 leads north 50 miles (80 km) to Pine Bluff and south 29 miles (47 km) to Hamburg, while US 278 leads west 16 miles (26 km) to Warren and east 26 miles (42 km) to McGehee. In the future, I-530 is planned to be extended and end at the proposed I-69 west of Monticello. Only part of future I-69 that is built is US 278 bypass named "Monticello Bypass." It is a two-lane expressway, opened October 2018. A portion of future I-530 is opened as AR 530 and is a two-lane expressway.

According to the United States Census Bureau, Monticello has a total area of 11.0 square miles (28.6 km^{2}), of which 0.02 square miles (0.04 km^{2}), or 0.14%, is water.

=== Climate ===
Monticello lies in the humid subtropical climate zone (Köppen Cfa). The climate in this area is characterized by hot, humid summers and generally mild to cool winters.

Climate data for Monticello, Arkansas (Monticello Municipal Airport) 1991–2020 normals, extremes 1876–present
Month	Jan	Feb	Mar	Apr	May	Jun	Jul	Aug	Sep	Oct	Nov	Dec	Year
Record high °F (°C)	83 (28)	86 (30)	90 (32)	96 (36)	99 (37)	104 (40)	109 (43)	108 (42)	108 (42)	97 (36)	89 (32)	82 (28)	109 (43)
Mean daily maximum °F (°C)	54.0 (12.2)	58.3 (14.6)	66.7 (19.3)	74.7 (23.7)	82.3 (27.9)	89.2 (31.8)	92.1 (33.4)	92.3 (33.5)	87.4 (30.8)	76.7 (24.8)	64.8 (18.2)	55.9 (13.3)	74.5 (23.6)
Daily mean °F (°C)	44.0 (6.7)	47.9 (8.8)	55.8 (13.2)	63.6 (17.6)	72.1 (22.3)	79.4 (26.3)	82.6 (28.1)	81.9 (27.7)	76.2 (24.6)	65.0 (18.3)	53.9 (12.2)	46.2 (7.9)	64.0 (17.8)
Mean daily minimum °F (°C)	34.0 (1.1)	37.6 (3.1)	44.8 (7.1)	52.5 (11.4)	61.9 (16.6)	69.7 (20.9)	73.0 (22.8)	71.6 (22.0)	64.9 (18.3)	53.3 (11.8)	43.1 (6.2)	36.6 (2.6)	53.6 (12.0)
Record low °F (°C)	−4 (−20)	−6 (−21)	11 (−12)	22 (−6)	36 (2)	43 (6)	50 (10)	46 (8)	33 (1)	20 (−7)	11 (−12)	−1 (−18)	−6 (−21)
Average precipitation inches (mm)	4.61 (117)	5.03 (128)	5.46 (139)	5.98 (152)	4.74 (120)	3.80 (97)	3.19 (81)	3.00 (76)	2.84 (72)	4.28 (109)	4.25 (108)	5.85 (149)	53.03 (1,347)
Average snowfall inches (cm)	0.6 (1.5)	0.1 (0.25)	0.0 (0.0)	0.0 (0.0)	0.0 (0.0)	0.0 (0.0)	0.0 (0.0)	0.0 (0.0)	0.0 (0.0)	0.0 (0.0)	0.0 (0.0)	0.0 (0.0)	0.7 (1.8)
Average precipitation days (≥ 0.01 in)	9.2	9.2	10.3	9.0	9.2	7.0	7.1	6.4	5.8	6.9	7.8	9.4	97.3
Average snowy days (≥ 0.1 in)	0.1	0.1	0.0	0.0	0.0	0.0	0.0	0.0	0.0	0.0	0.0	0.1	0.3
Source: NOAA

== Demographics ==
Historical population
Census	Pop.	Note	%±
1880	891		—
1890	1,285		44.2%
1900	1,579		22.9%
1910	2,274		44.0%
1920	2,378		4.6%
1930	3,076		29.4%
1940	3,650		18.7%
1950	4,501		23.3%
1960	4,412		−2.0%
1970	5,085		15.3%
1980	8,259		62.4%
1990	8,116		−1.7%
2000	9,146		12.7%
2010	9,467		3.5%
2020	8,442		−10.8%
2025 (est.)	8,269	▼	−2.0%
U.S. Decennial Census

=== 2020 census ===
As of the 2020 census, Monticello had a population of 8,442. The median age was 33.5 years. 23.9% of residents were under the age of 18 and 15.8% of residents were 65 years of age or older. For every 100 females there were 88.6 males, and for every 100 females age 18 and over there were 83.0 males age 18 and over.

92.5% of residents lived in urban areas, while 7.5% lived in rural areas.

There were 3,439 households and 2,104 families in Monticello. Of households, 30.3% had children under the age of 18 living in them. Of all households, 34.7% were married-couple households, 19.2% were households with a male householder and no spouse or partner present, and 39.3% were households with a female householder and no spouse or partner present. About 34.3% of all households were made up of individuals and 12.5% had someone living alone who was 65 years of age or older.

There were 4,048 housing units, of which 15.0% were vacant. The homeowner vacancy rate was 2.4% and the rental vacancy rate was 13.0%.

Monticello racial composition
Race	Num.	Perc.
White (non-Hispanic)	4,324	51.22%
Black or African American (non-Hispanic)	3,293	39.01%
Native American	50	0.59%
Asian	78	0.92%
Pacific Islander	7	0.08%
Other/Mixed	322	3.81%
Hispanic or Latino	368	4.36%

=== 2000 census ===
As of the census of 2000, there were 9,146 people, 3,592 households, and 2,316 families residing in the city. The population density was 852.0 inhabitants per square mile (329.0/km^{2}). There were 3,972 housing units at an average density of 370.0 per square mile (142.9/km^{2}). The racial makeup of the city was 64.96% White, 32.62% Black or African American, 0.15% Native American, 0.70% Asian, 0.01% Pacific Islander, 0.58% from other races, and 0.98% from two or more races. Hispanic or Latino of any race were 1.29% of the population.

There were 3,592 households, out of which 32.5% had children under the age of 18 living with them, 42.5% were married couples living together, 18.3% had a female householder with no husband present, and 35.5% were non-families. 29.3% of all households were made up of individuals, and 11.2% had someone living alone who was 65 years of age or older. The average household size was 2.37 and the average family size was 2.94.

In the city, the population was spread out, with 25.8% under the age of 18, 16.1% from 18 to 24, 25.9% from 25 to 44, 18.7% from 45 to 64, and 13.4% who were 65 years of age or older. The median age was 31 years. For every 100 females, there were 87.2 males. For every 100 females age 18 and over, there were 83.5 males.

The median income for a household in the city was $26,821, and the median income for a family was $36,615. Males had a median income of $32,029 versus $21,546 for females. The per capita income for the city was $16,113. About 14.8% of families and 20.1% of the population were below the poverty line, including 24.5% of those under age 18 and 20.2% of those age 65 or over.

== Government ==
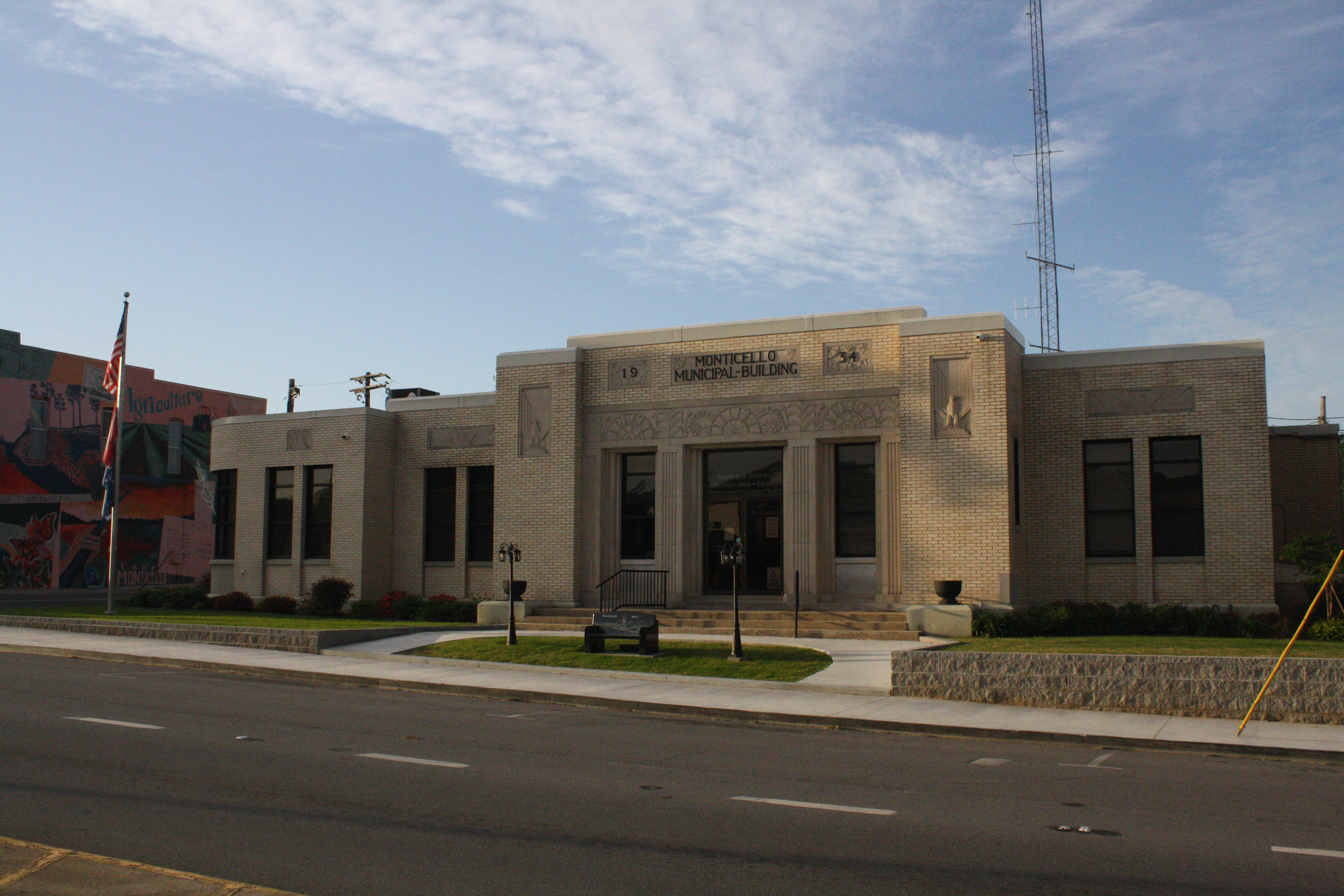
Monticello Municipal Building

Monticello operates under a mayor-council government, with two aldermen representing the city's four wards on the city council. Aldermen are elected to two-year terms. The mayor, city attorney, and municipal judge are elected to four-year terms.

== Education ==
=== Primary and secondary ===
Most of Monticello is served by the Monticello School District while small portions are served by the Drew Central School District.

The Monticello School District consists of Monticello Elementary School (grades K to 2), Monticello Intermediate School (grades 3 to 5) Monticello Middle School (grades 6 to 8), and Monticello High School (grades 9 to 12).

The Drew Central School District primarily serves the outlying areas of Monticello. It consists of Drew Central Elementary School (grades PreK to 4), Drew Central Middle School (grades 5 to 8), and Drew Central High School (grades 9 to 12).

Monticello also has two private academies. Monticello Christian Academy serves grades K through 12, and Grace Christian Academy serves grades K through 8.

==== Athletics ====
High School football is a popular community event; the Monticello High School Billies won the AAA (now AAAAA) state championship in 1994 and in 2009.

=== Post-secondary ===
Monticello is the home of the University of Arkansas at Monticello.

=== Public libraries ===
Drew County's first library was housed in the grand jury room of the county courthouse when Congressman Albert Rust offered a gift of books from United States Congress. The Southeast Arkansas Regional Library started as the Sorosis Club in Monticello on September 4, 1902, and moved to their own building in 1954. Today, the Southeast Arkansas Public Library has its headquarters in the Monticello Branch Library.

== Media ==
=== Radio stations ===
- KGPQ 99.9 FM, adult contemporary
- KHBM 1430 AM
- KHBM-FM 93.7 FM, classic rock

=== Newspaper ===
- The Advance-Monticellonian (weekly)
- South Ark Weather & News (daily)
- South Ark Daily (daily)

== Notable people ==
- H. Ray Burks, Little Rock architect
- James Milton Carroll, Baptist pastor and historian
- Saul Davis, Negro league baseball player
- Rodney Shelton Foss, perhaps the first American killed in World War II
- Hershel Gober, former United States Deputy Secretary of Veterans Affairs
- Jesse Gonder, baseball player for New York Mets
- Trent Harmon, winner of the 15th season of American Idol
- Catherine Dorris Norrell, U.S. Representative, 1961-1963
- William F. Norrell, U.S. Representative, 1939-1961
- Eric Reed, Major League Baseball player
- William F. Slemons, U.S. Representative, 1875-1881

== In popular culture ==
- A season 5 episode of the Discovery Channel series A Haunting, called "The Haunting of Allen House", takes place in Monticello in 2005.

== Infrastructure ==
=== Transportation ===
==== Aviation ====
The Monticello Municipal Airport is a public owned, public use general aviation airport in Monticello.

==== Major highways ====
- US Route 278
- US Route 425
- Highway 35
- Highway 83
- Highway 83 Spur
- Highway 45
- Highway 138
- Highway 980
- Future Interstate 69
- Future Interstate 530

=== Utilities ===
Monticello first established public water and electric utilities in 1901. Sanitary sewer service was established in 1916.

== See also ==
- North Main Street Historic District
