= Drew Central School District =

School district in Arkansas, United States

Address
- 250 University Drive Monticello, Arkansas, 71655; United States

District information
- Type: Public
- Grades: PreK–12
- NCES District ID: 0505470

Students and staff
- Students: 1,181
- Teachers: 79.69
- Staff: 87.3
- Student–teacher ratio: 14.82

Other information
- Website: www.drewcentral.org

Drew Central School District 5 is a public school district located in Drew County, Arkansas.

Established in 1927, the school district covers 570 square miles (1,500 km^{2}), almost all in rural Drew County, from where all the students are bussed into Monticello. The majority of Monticello itself is not in Drew Central School District, but is within a district of its own, Monticello School District. The school administration and buildings of Drew Dentral Schools are in a section of the Monticello city limits that is within the Drew Central Schools boundaries, adjacent to the University of Arkansas at Monticello (UAM). These buildings are on 31 acres (13 ha) of land leased by the university to the school district. Dependent minor residents of the UAM housing for married students and students with families, HHFA Apartments, are assigned to this district. Additionally Wilmar is in the Drew Central district, as is the unincorporated area of Selma. A portion of the Drew Central district extends into Desha County.

== History ==
The Drew County School Board established the A and M Training School #5 as a laboratory school for the Arkansas Agricultural and Mechanical College (now the University of Arkansas at Monticello). In 1934, school district's name changed to Drew Central School District #5. Growth in both the school district and the college as well as a fire that had destroyed the school buildings contributed to a decision for the school district to become independent of the college. The college gave the school district a 99-year lease to a plot of land. In 1983, the district added 11 acres (4.5 ha) to the lease.

Multiple districts consolidated into Drew Central. In 1979, the Collins and Selma school districts dissolved, with portions of the students going to the Drew Central school district. On July 1, 1990, the Wilmar School District was consolidated into the Drew Central School District. As of 2017, this was the latest such consolidation.

== Schools ==
- Drew Central Elementary School, serving prekindergarten through grade 4.
- Drew Central Middle School, serving grades 5 through 8.
- Drew Central High School, serving grades 9 through 12.

From 1990 until 1992, the district operated schools in Wilmar after the consolidation of the Wilmar district. In 1992, the remaining Wilmar school(s) was/were consolidated into the Drew Central schools.
