= KHBM-FM =

- Monticello, Arkansas; United States
- Broadcast area: The Ark-La-Miss
- Frequency: 93.7 MHz
- Branding: 93.7 FM

Programming
- Format: Classic rock

Ownership
- Owner: Pines Broadcasting
- Sister stations: KGPQ; KWRF-FM; KXSA-FM

History
- First air date: 1968

Technical information
- Licensing authority: FCC
- Facility ID: 42063
- Class: C2
- ERP: 23,000 watts
- HAAT: 127 meters (417 ft)
- Transmitter coordinates: 33°46′35.4″N 91°43′2.5″W

Links
- Public license information: Public file; LMS

KHBM-FM (93.7 FM) is a classic rock formatted radio station licensed to Monticello, Arkansas, United States. The station is currently owned by Pines Broadcasting.

== History ==
KHBM-FM was first licensed on June 4, 1968. On April 27, 2007, the station was sold to Pines Broadcasting.

== Programming ==
The station's day-to-day programming mostly consists of a 24-hour classic rock Format.
