= Saul Davis =

American baseball player

- Shortstop
- Born: February 22, 1901; Monticello, Arkansas, U.S.
- Died: February 8, 1994 (aged 92); Minot, North Dakota, U.S.
- Batted: Right Threw: Right

Negro league baseball debut
- 1921, for the Columbus Buckeyes

Last appearance
- 1931, for the Detroit Stars
- Stats at Baseball Reference

Teams
- Columbus Buckeyes (1921); Birmingham Black Barons (1925); Memphis Red Sox (1926–1929, 1930); Cleveland Tigers (1928); Chicago American Giants (1929–1930); Detroit Stars (1931)

Saul Henry "Rareback" Davis (February 22, 1901 – February 8, 1994) was an American professional baseball shortstop in the Negro leagues. He played from 1921 to 1931 with several teams.
