= KGPQ =

- Monticello, Arkansas; United States
- Frequency: 99.9 MHz

Programming
- Format: Adult Contemporary

Ownership
- Owner: Pines Broadcasting

Technical information
- Licensing authority: FCC
- Facility ID: 51150
- Class: C3
- ERP: 25,000 watts
- HAAT: 100.0 meters (328.1 ft)
- Transmitter coordinates: 33°43′49.3″N 91°48′56.4″W

Links
- Public license information: Public file; LMS

KGPQ (99.9 FM) is a radio station broadcasting an Adult Contemporary music format. Licensed to Monticello, Arkansas, United States. The station is currently owned by Pines Broadcasting.
