= List of highways in Arkansas =

This is a list of highways in Arkansas.

== Interstate highways ==
- Interstate 30
- Interstate 40
- Interstate 49
- Interstate 55
- Interstate 57 (proposed)
- Interstate 69 (proposed)
- Interstate 130 (former proposal)
- Interstate 430
- Interstate 440
- Interstate 530
- Interstate 540
- Interstate 555
- Interstate 630
- Interstate 730 (former proposal)

== United States highways ==
North-south routes
- U.S. Route 425
- U.S. Route 49
- U.S. Route 59
- U.S. Route 61
- U.S. Route 63
- U.S. Route 65
- U.S. Route 165
- U.S. Route 67
- US 67W (decommissioned)
- US 67W (decommissioned)
- US 67W (decommissioned)
- US 67E (decommissioned)
- US 67E (decommissioned)
- US 67E (decommissioned)
- U.S. Route 167
- U.S. Route 71
- U.S. Route 271
- U.S. Route 371
- U.S. Route 79
East-west routes
- U.S. Route 412
- U.S. Route 62
- U.S. Route 64
- U.S. Route 70
- U.S. Route 270
- U.S. Route 278
- U.S. Route 82

== Major state highways ==
North-south routes
- Highway 1
- Highway 5
- Highway 7
East-west routes
- Highway 2
- Highway 10
