= Monticello Municipal Airport (Arkansas) =

Airport in Arkansas, United States

Monticello Municipal Airport Ellis Field
- IATA: none; ICAO: KLLQ; FAA LID: LLQ

Summary
- Airport type: Public
- Owner: City of Monticello
- Serves: Monticello, Arkansas
- Elevation AMSL: 270 ft (82 m)
- Coordinates: 33°38′19″N 091°45′04″W

Map
- Location of airport in Arkansas LLQ (the United States)

Runways
Direction	Length		Surface
Direction	ft	m	Surface
3/21	5,018	1,529	Asphalt

Statistics (2010)
- Aircraft operations: 13,800
- Based aircraft: 24
- Source: Federal Aviation Administration

Monticello Municipal Airport (ICAO: KLLQ, FAA LID: LLQ, formerly M76), also known as Ellis Field, is a public-use airport located two nautical miles (4 km) east of the central business district of Monticello, in Drew County, Arkansas, United States. It is owned by the City of Monticello.

This airport is included in the FAA's National Plan of Integrated Airport Systems for 2011–2015, which categorized it as a general aviation airport.

Although most U.S. airports use the same three-letter location identifier for the FAA and IATA, Monticello Municipal Airport is assigned LLQ by the FAA but has no designation from the IATA.

== Facilities and aircraft ==
The airport covers an area of 385 acres (156 ha) at an elevation of 270 feet (82 m) above mean sea level. It has one runway designated 3/21 with an asphalt surface measuring 5,018 by 75 feet (1,529 x 23 m).

For the 12-month period ending September 30, 2010, the airport had 13,800 aircraft operations, an average of 37 per day: 96% general aviation and 4% military. At that time there were 24 aircraft based at this airport: 87.5% single-engine and 12.5% multi-engine.

== See also ==
- List of airports in Arkansas
