= Wilmar, Arkansas =

- City
- Location of Wilmar in Drew County, Arkansas.
- Coordinates: 33°37′25″N 91°55′53″W
- Country: United States
- State: Arkansas
- County: Drew

Area
  - Total: 1.54 sq mi (3.98 km^{2})
  - Land: 1.54 sq mi (3.98 km^{2})
  - Water: 0 sq mi (0.00 km^{2})
- Elevation: 167 ft (51 m)

Population (2020)
  - Total: 395
  - Estimate (2025): 392 ▼
  - Density: 257.4/sq mi (99.37/km^{2})
- Time zone: UTC-6 (Central (CST))
  - Summer (DST): UTC-5 (CDT)
- ZIP code: 71675
- Area code: 870
- FIPS code: 05-75860
- GNIS feature ID: 2405753

Wilmar is a city in Drew County, Arkansas, United States. As of the 2020 census, Wilmar had a population of 395.

== Geography ==
Wilmar is located in western Drew County along U.S. Route 278, which leads east 8 miles (13 km) to Monticello, the county seat, and west 8 miles (13 km) to Warren. Arkansas Highway 133 leads north from Wilmar 7 miles (11 km) to Arkansas Highway 35, east of Rye.

According to the United States Census Bureau, Wilmar has a total area of 1.6 square miles (4.1 km^{2}), all land.

== Demographics ==
Historical population
Census	Pop.	Note	%±
1900	844		—
1910	929		10.1%
1920	1,034		11.3%
1930	627		−39.4%
1940	695		10.8%
1950	746		7.3%
1960	718		−3.8%
1970	653		−9.1%
1980	747		14.4%
1990	637		−14.7%
2000	571		−10.4%
2010	511		−10.5%
2020	395		−22.7%
2025 (est.)	392	▼	−0.8%
U.S. Decennial Census

=== 2020 Census ===
Wilmar, Arkansas – Racial and ethnic composition Note: the US Census treats Hispanic/Latino as an ethnic category. This table excludes Latinos from the racial categories and assigns them to a separate category. Hispanics/Latinos may be of any race.
Race / Ethnicity (NH = Non-Hispanic)	Pop 2000	Pop 2010	Pop 2020	% 2000	% 2010	% 2020
White alone (NH)	157	133	79	27.50%	26.03%	20.00%
Black or African American alone (NH)	410	364	287	71.80%	71.23%	72.66%
Native American or Alaska Native alone (NH)	0	0	0	0.00%	0.00%	0.00%
Asian alone (NH)	0	0	0	0.00%	0.00%	0.00%
Pacific Islander alone (NH)	1	0	0	0.18%	0.00%	0.00%
Other race alone (NH)	0	0	2	0.00%	0.00%	0.51%
Mixed race or Multiracial (NH)	3	3	15	0.53%	0.59%	3.80%
Hispanic or Latino (any race)	0	11	12	0.00%	2.15%	3.04%
Total	571	511	395	100.00%	100.00%	100.00%

=== 2000 census ===
As of the census of 2000, there were 571 people, 238 households, and 163 families residing in the city. The population density was 364.6 inhabitants per square mile (140.8/km^{2}). There were 273 housing units at an average density of 174.3 per square mile (67.3/km^{2}). The racial makeup of the city was 27.50% White, 71.80% Black or African American, 0.18% Pacific Islander, and 0.53% from two or more races.

There were 238 households, out of which 31.5% had children under the age of 18 living with them, 39.5% were married couples living together, 25.2% had a female householder with no husband present, and 31.5% were non-families. 29.0% of all households were made up of individuals, and 12.6% had someone living alone who was 65 years of age or older. The average household size was 2.40 and the average family size was 2.93.

In the city, the population was spread out, with 27.1% under the age of 18, 9.1% from 18 to 24, 25.4% from 25 to 44, 21.7% from 45 to 64, and 16.6% who were 65 years of age or older. The median age was 37 years. For every 100 females, there were 89.7 males. For every 100 females age 18 and over, there were 80.1 males.

The median income for a household in the city was $16,304, and the median income for a family was $23,854. Males had a median income of $19,643 versus $16,071 for females. The per capita income for the city was $10,810. About 24.8% of families and 29.5% of the population were below the poverty line, including 39.4% of those under age 18 and 40.6% of those age 65 or over.

== Education ==
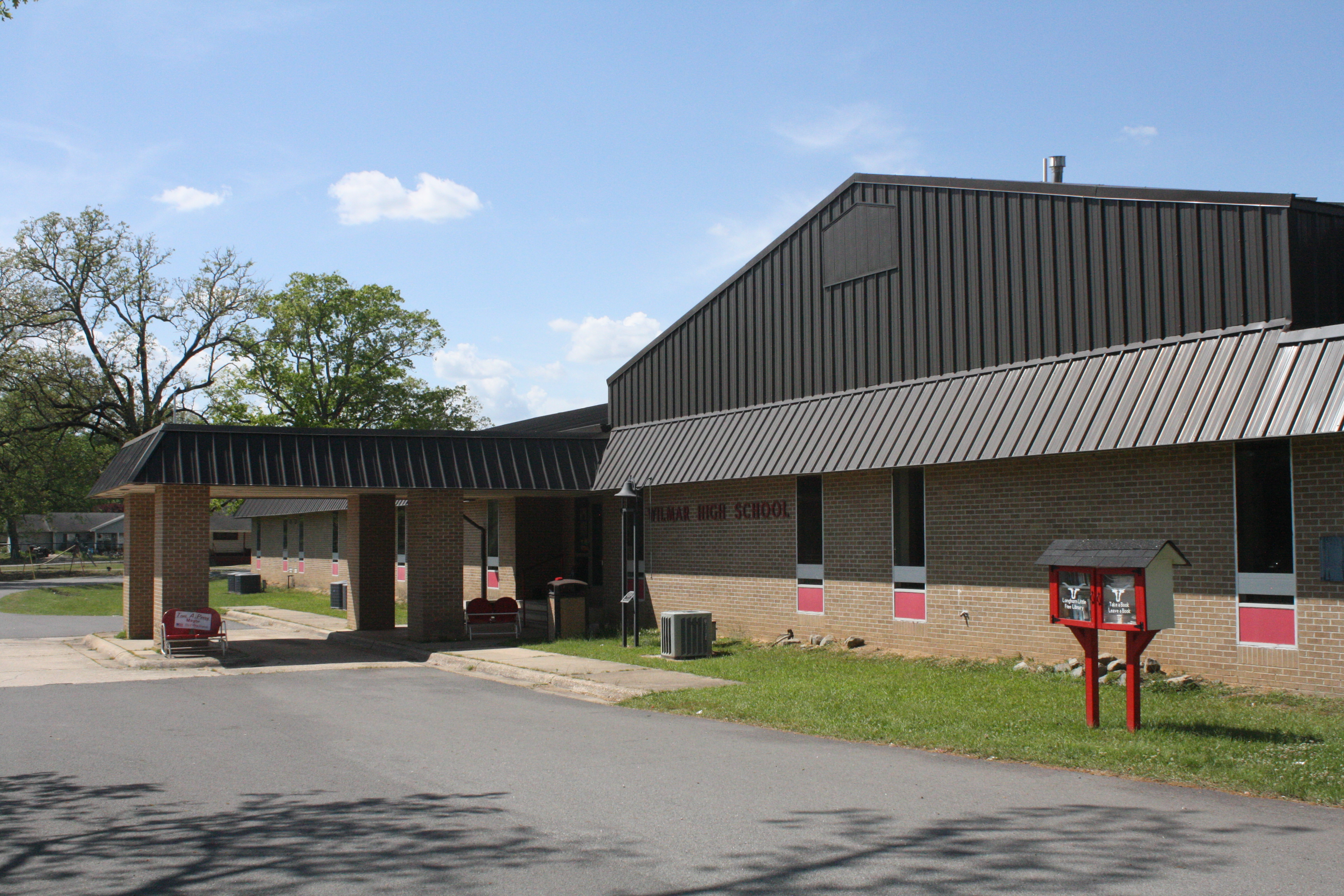
Former Wilmar High School

Wilmar is served by the Drew Central School District.

On July 1, 1990, the Wilmar School District was consolidated into the Drew Central School District. Drew Central operated schools in Wilmar from 1990 until 1992, when they were consolidated with those on the main Drew Central campus.
