= Monticello School District (Arkansas) =

School district in Arkansas, United States

Address
- 935 Scogin Drive Monticello, Arkansas, 71655; United States

District information
- Type: Public
- Grades: PreK–12
- NCES District ID: 0509840

Students and staff
- Students: 1,728
- Teachers: 142.59
- Staff: 142.09
- Student–teacher ratio: 12.12

Other information
- Website: www.billies.org

Monticello School District 18 is a school district based in Monticello, Arkansas, United States. It serves almost all of the Monticello city limits.

== Schools ==
- Monticello Elementary School, serving prekindergarten through grade 2.
- Monticello Intermediate School, serving grades 3 through 5.
- Monticello Middle School, serving grades 6 through 8.
- Monticello High School, serving grades 9 through 12.
- Monticello Vocational Center, serving grades 9 through 12.
