= University of Arkansas at Monticello =

Public university in Monticello, Arkansas, US

Coordinates: 33°35′27″N 91°48′47″W

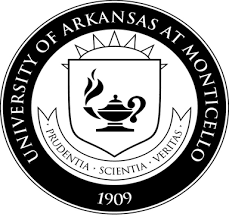
- Former names: Fourth District Agricultural School (1910–1925); Arkansas Agricultural and Mechanical College (1925–1971)
- Motto: Veritate Duce Progredi
- Motto in English: To Advance with Truth as our Guide
- Type: Public university
- Established: September 4, 1910; 116 years ago
- Parent institution: University of Arkansas System
- Academic affiliations: Space-grant
- Endowment: US$22,764,898
- Chancellor: Peggy Doss
- Faculty: 373
- Students: 2,856 (as of fall 2024)
- Location: Monticello, Arkansas, United States
- Colors: Green and white
- Nickname: Boll Weevils & Cotton Blossoms
- Sporting affiliations: NCAA Division II - Great American Conference
- Website: www.uamont.edu
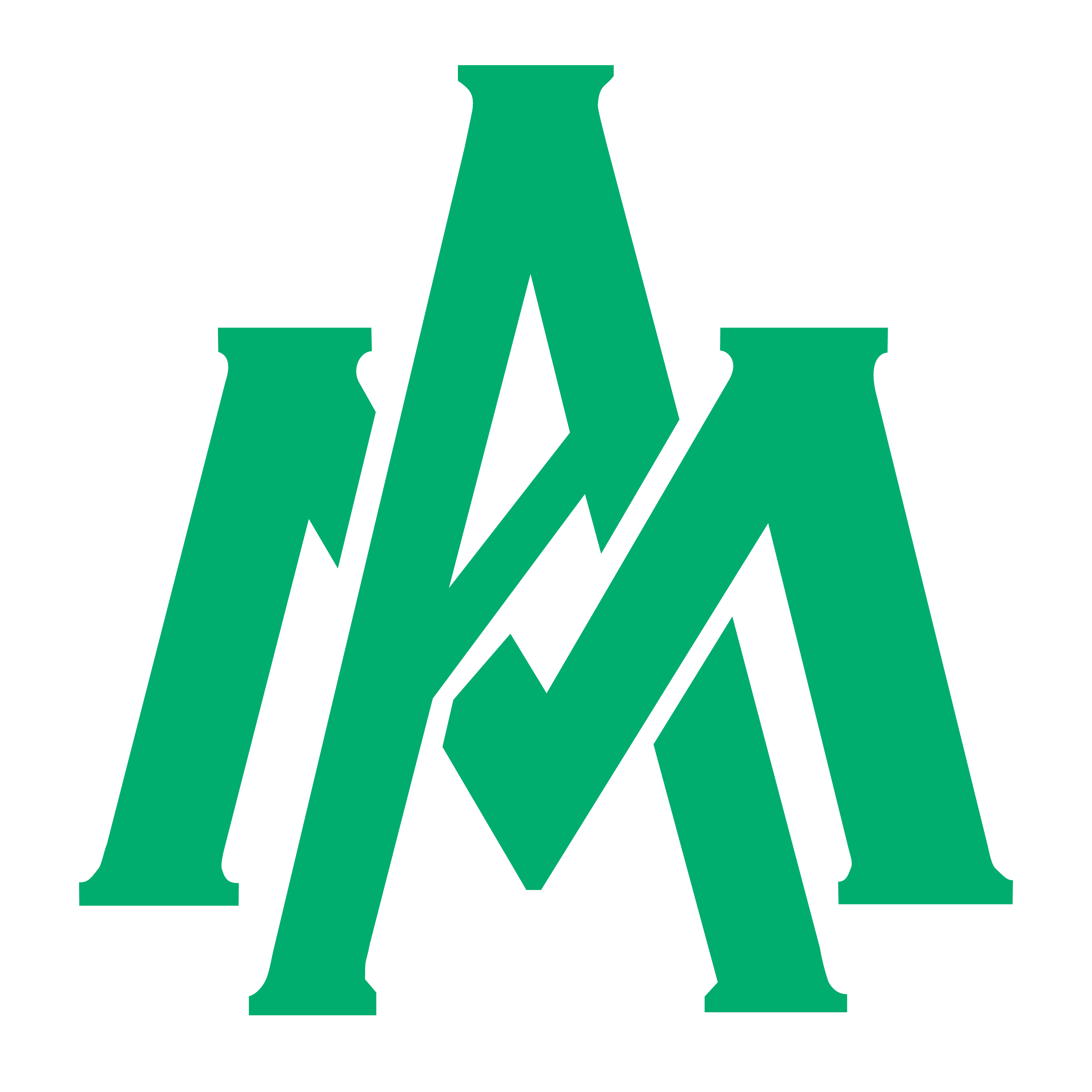

The University of Arkansas at Monticello (UAM) is a public university in Monticello, Arkansas, United States, with Colleges of Technology in Crossett and McGehee. UAM is part of the University of Arkansas System and offers master's degrees, baccalaureate degrees, and associate degrees. The city is in the Arkansas Timberlands, and UAM is home to the state's only School of Forest Resources.

The university is governed by the University of Arkansas Board of Trustees, which also oversees the operation of universities and other post-secondary educational institutions in Batesville, DeQueen, Fayetteville, Fort Smith, Helena, Hope, Little Rock, Morrilton, and Pine Bluff, Arkansas.

UAM offers in-state tuition rates not only to Arkansas residents but also to regional residents of Mississippi, Louisiana, Texas, Oklahoma, Missouri, and Tennessee.

== History ==
The University of Arkansas at Monticello was established in 1909 by an act of the Arkansas General Assembly to serve the educational needs of southern Arkansas. Originally called the Fourth District Agricultural School, the school opened its doors September 14, 1910. In 1925, the General Assembly authorized the school's name to be changed to the Arkansas Agricultural and Mechanical College. Arkansas A&M received accreditation as a junior college in 1928, and as a four-year institution in 1940.

During World War II, Arkansas A&M College was one of 131 U.S. colleges and universities that took part in the V-12 Navy College Training Program, which offered students a path to a Navy commission.

Arkansas A&M became part of the University of Arkansas System on July 1, 1971. It then became designated as the University of Arkansas at Monticello. From 1969 to 1972, the University of Arkansas System increased its racial diversity and serving the state population by adding three new campuses: in Little Rock, Pine Bluff, and Monticello. These cities either already had numerous Black students, or, which in the case of the new campus in Little Rock, would soon admit Black students.

On July 1, 2003, the University of Arkansas at Monticello expanded its mission to include vocational and technical education. The UAM College of Technology-Crossett and the UAM College of Technology-McGehee became part of the University of Arkansas at Monticello, creating a larger system of post-secondary education in Southern Arkansas.

In July 2018, the School of Agriculture merged with the School of Forestry and Natural Resources to become the School of Forestry, Agriculture, and Natural Resources.

=== Laboratory school ===
The Drew County School Board established the A & M Training School #5 as a laboratory school for the college. In 1934, the district's name changed to Drew Central School District #5. A fire destroyed the school buildings, and growth in the population of both the school district and the college resulted in the school district becoming independent of the college. The college gave the school district a 99-year lease to a plot of land. Originally that land was 20 acres (8.1 ha). In 1983 the district added 11 acres (4.5 ha) to the lease.

== Organization ==
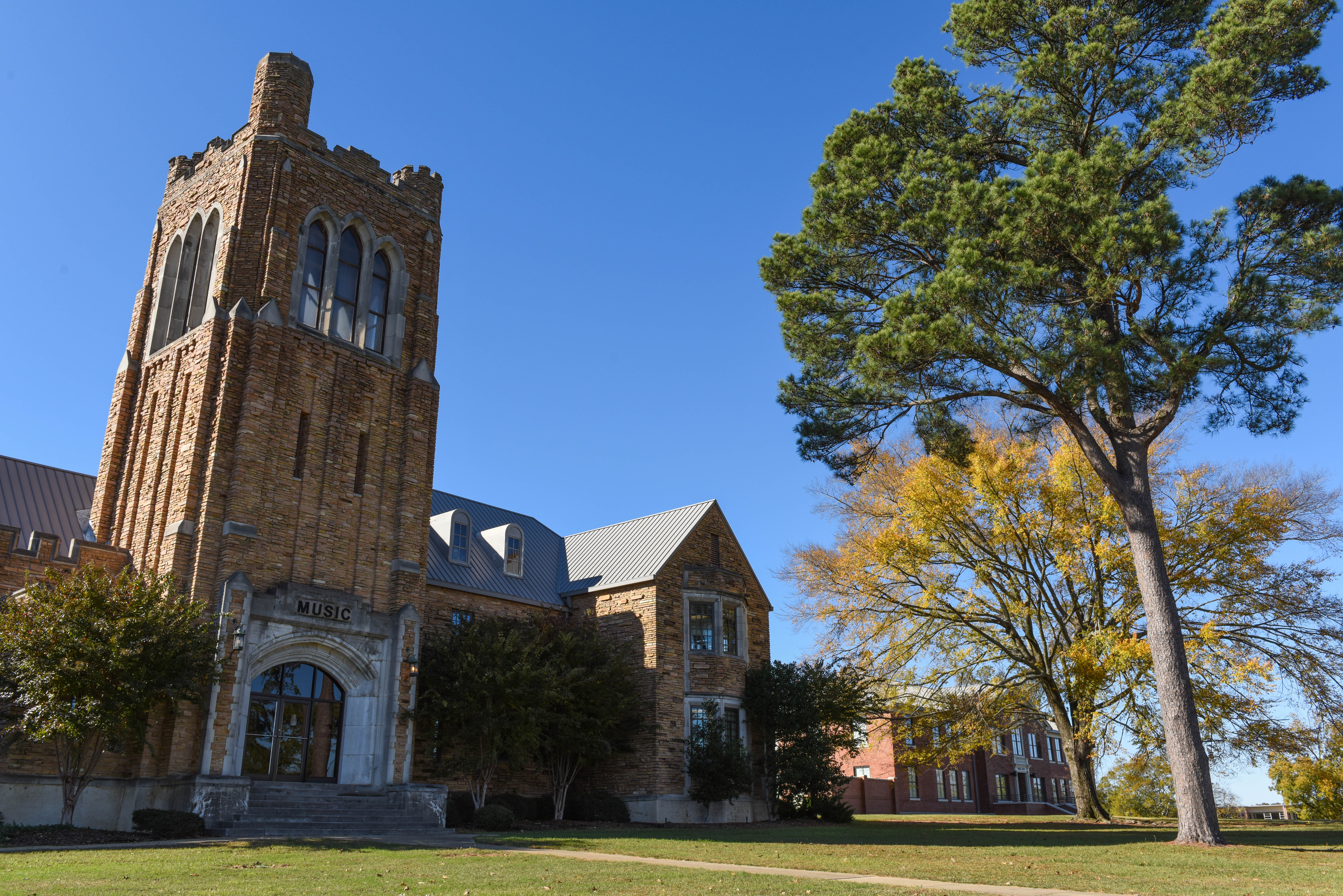
University of Arkansas at Monticello Music Building

UAM is composed of eight distinct schools and colleges:

- School of Computer Information Systems
- School of Nursing
- School of Business
- School of Arts and Humanities
- School of Education
- School of Mathematical and Natural Sciences: The School of Mathematical and Natural Sciences is the school of sciences of the university. It is located in the Science Center Building. The school employs 23 faculty and offers Bachelor of Science degrees in four major areas: Biology, Chemistry, Mathematics, and Natural Sciences. It has around 176 students enrolled in its major and minor programs. The school is also home to pre-professional programs in Allied Health, Pre-Dentistry, Pre-Engineering, Pre-Medicine, Pre-Optometry, and Pre-Pharmacy.
- School of Social and Behavioral Sciences
- College of Forestry, Agriculture and Natural Resources: This is the only Forestry school in the State of Arkansas. It is appropriately located in the timber-producing region of Arkansas. There will be a doctorate program in forest resources.

UAM also has one specialized division, the Division of Music.

== Campus ==
Undergraduate demographics as of fall 2023
Race and ethnicity	Total
White	54%
Black	30%
Hispanic	9%
Two or more races	6%
International student	1%
Economic diversity
Low-income (Note: The percentage of students who received an income-based federal Pell grant intended for low-income students.)	59%
Affluent (Note: The percentage of students who are a part of the American middle class at the bare minimum.)	41%

The main campus in Monticello has one single-sex dormitory and three coeducational suite dormitories. The former is Horsfall Hall for women, and the latter three are Bankston Hall, Maxwell Hall, and Royer Hall. University Apartments is for single upperclassman students. There was previously a complex for married students, students with families, and university faculty, HHFA Apartments. These apartments were demolished. The family housing existed in the boundary of the Drew Central School District, which operates three schools that serve dependent minors living in the UAM family complex: Drew Central Elementary School, Drew Central Middle School, and Drew Central High School.

The Turner Neal Museum of Natural History is located on campus, and includes the Pomeroy Planetarium.

Religious organizations operating on campus include the Baptist Collegiate Ministry, (Note: Affiliated with the Arkansas Baptist State Convention of the Southern Baptist Convention) Missionary Baptist Student Fellowship, Weevils for Christ, (Note: Affiliated with the Churches of Christ) and the Wesley Foundation. (Note: Affiliated with the United Methodist Church)

== Athletics ==
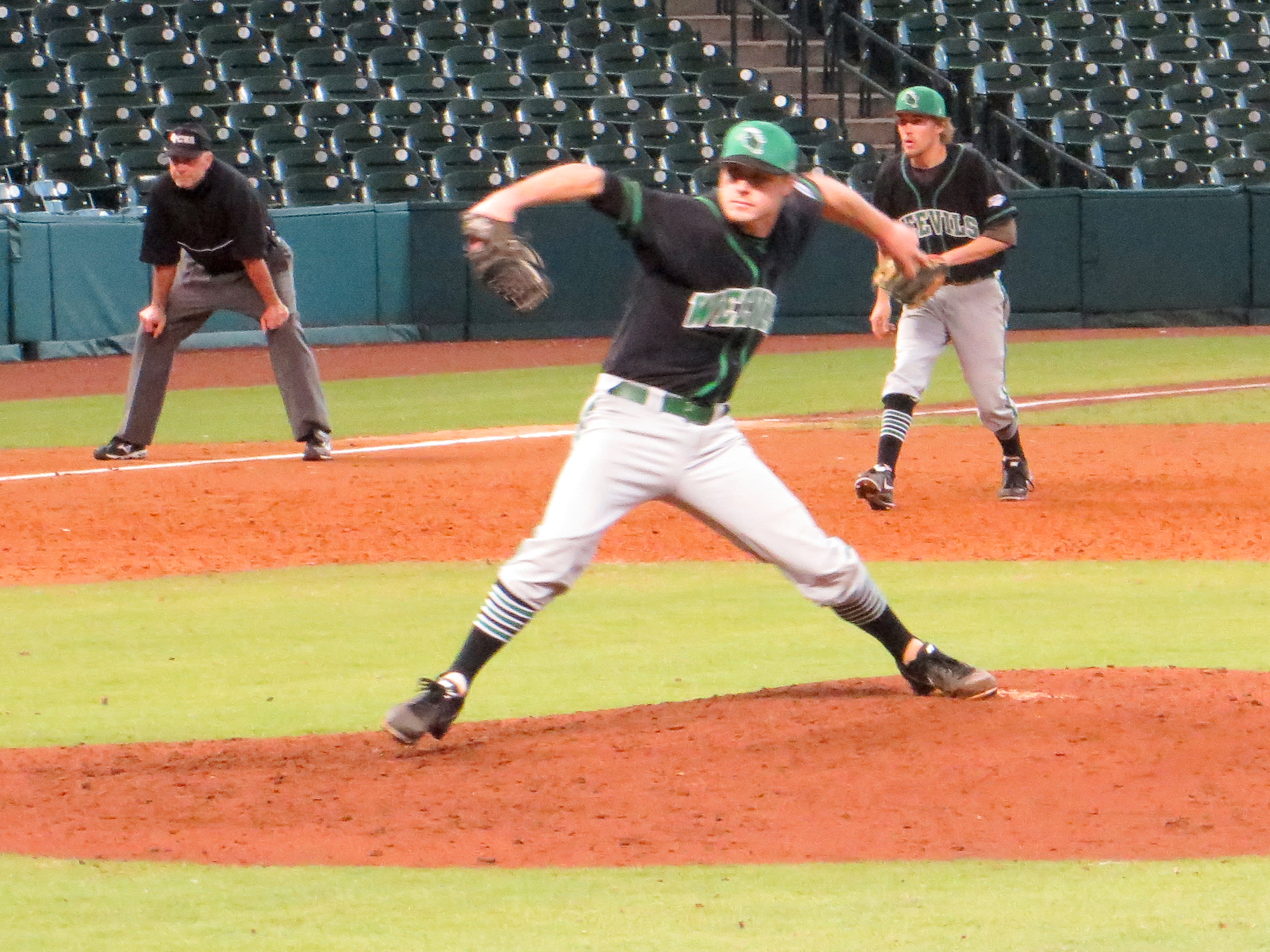
UAM pitcher Jeff Harvill delivers a pitch at Minute Maid Park in 2014.

University of Arkansas at Monticello athletic teams are known as the Boll Weevils and Cotton Blossoms. UAM is a member of the NCAA Division II and currently competes within the Great American Conference (GAC) for ten sports, including: baseball, men's and women's basketball, men's and women's cross country, football, men's and women's golf, softball, and women's volleyball. In 2011 the university left the Gulf South Conference to become a charter member of the Great American Conference (GAC) with six other GSC member schools.

== Notable alumni ==
- Derick Armstrong, professional football player
- Gene Jeffress, member of the Arkansas Senate
- Wes Johnson, head baseball coach of the Georgia Bulldogs
- Art Kaufman, college football coach
- Jeff Wardlaw, member of the Arkansas House of Representatives

== Notable UAM people ==
- Jimmie Yeiser (2012), provost and vice chancellor for academic affairs
